= 1998 UCI Road World Cup =

- Tenth edition of the UCI Road World Cup

Details
- Dates: 21 March – 17 October 1998
- Location: Europe
- Races: 10

Champions
- Individual champion: Michele Bartoli (ITA) (Asics–CGA)
- Teams' champion: Mapei–Bricobi

The 1998 UCI Road World Cup was the tenth edition of the UCI Road World Cup, cycling's season-long competition of the ten top-tier one-day classics. It was won by Italian classics specialist Michele Bartoli of the Asics–CGA team. Italian team Mapei–Bricobi won the team competition and placed four riders in the individual top-ten.

Bartoli moved into the lead of the World Cup after his win in Liège–Bastogne–Liège, and claimed a second event win at the Grand Prix de Suisse. He ended the competition with 416 points, more than double the points total of the runner-up, Léon van Bon and a competition record with the point system in place since 1997 to 2004.

== Races ==
Date	Race	Country	Winner	Team	World Cup Leader	Leader's Team	Report
21 March	Milan–San Remo	Italy	Erik Zabel (GER)	Team Telekom	Erik Zabel (GER)	Team Telekom	Report
5 April	Tour of Flanders	Belgium	Johan Museeuw (BEL)	Mapei–Bricobi	Stefano Zanini (ITA)	Mapei–Bricobi	Report
12 April	Paris–Roubaix	France	Franco Ballerini (ITA)	Mapei–Bricobi	Franco Ballerini (ITA)	Mapei–Bricobi	Report
19 April	Liège–Bastogne–Liège	Belgium	Michele Bartoli (ITA)	Asics–CGA	Michele Bartoli (ITA)	Asics–CGA	Report
25 April	Amstel Gold Race	Netherlands	Rolf Järmann (SUI)	Casino–Ag2r	Michele Bartoli (ITA)	Asics–CGA	Report
8 August	Clásica de San Sebastián	Spain	Francesco Casagrande (ITA)	Cofidis	Michele Bartoli (ITA)	Asics–CGA	Report
16 August	HEW Cyclassics	Germany	Léon van Bon (NED)	Rabobank	Michele Bartoli (ITA)	Asics–CGA	Report
23 August	Grand Prix de Suisse	Switzerland	Michele Bartoli (ITA)	Asics–CGA	Michele Bartoli (ITA)	Asics–CGA	Report
4 October	Paris–Tours	France	Jacky Durand (FRA)	Casino–Ag2r	Michele Bartoli (ITA)	Asics–CGA	Report
17 October	Giro di Lombardia	Italy	Oscar Camenzind (SUI)	Mapei–Bricobi	Michele Bartoli (ITA)	Asics–CGA	Report

== Single races details ==
worldcupjersey	Denotes the Classification Leader

In the race results the leader jersey identify the rider who wore the jersey in the race (the leader at the start of the race).

In the general classification table the jersey identify the leader after the race.

21 March 1998 — Milan–San Remo 294 km (182.7 mi)

	Rider	Team	Time
1	Erik Zabel (GER)	Team Telekom	7h 10' 14"
2	Emmanuel Magnien (FRA)	Française des Jeux	s.t.
3	Frédéric Moncassin (FRA)	GAN	s.t.
4	Stefano Zanini (ITA)	Mapei–Bricobi	s.t.
5	Andrei Tchmil (BEL)	Lotto–Mobistar	s.t.
6	Filippo Casagrande (ITA)	Scrigno–Gaerne	s.t.
7	Peter van Petegem (BEL)	TVM–Farm Frites	s.t.
8	Michele Bartoli (ITA)	Asics–CGA	s.t.
9	Roberto Petito (ITA)	Saeco–Cannondale	s.t.
10	Alberto Elli (ITA)	Casino–Ag2r	s.t.

General classification after Milan–San Remo

	Rider	Team	Points
1	Erik Zabel (GER)	Team Telekom	100
2	Emmanuel Magnien (FRA)	Française des Jeux	70
3	Frédéric Moncassin (FRA)	GAN	50
4	Stefano Zanini (ITA)	Mapei–Bricobi	40
5	Andrei Tchmil (BEL)	Lotto–Mobistar	36
6	Filippo Casagrande (ITA)	Scrigno–Gaerne	32
7	Peter van Petegem (BEL)	TVM–Farm Frites	28
8	Michele Bartoli (ITA)	Asics–CGA	24
9	Roberto Petito (ITA)	Saeco–Cannondale	20
10	Alberto Elli (ITA)	Casino–Ag2r	16

5 April 1998 — Tour of Flanders 277 km (172.1 mi)

	Rider	Team	Time
1	Johan Museeuw (BEL)	Mapei–Bricobi	6h 50' 02"
2	Stefano Zanini (ITA)	Mapei–Bricobi	+ 43"
3	Andrei Tchmil (BEL)	Lotto–Mobistar	s.t.
4	Emmanuel Magnien (FRA)	Française des Jeux	s.t.
5	Peter Van Petegem (BEL)	TVM–Farm Frites	s.t.
6	Michele Bartoli (ITA)	Asics–CGA	s.t.
7	Viatcheslav Ekimov (RUS)	U.S. Postal Service	s.t.
8	Franco Ballerini (ITA)	Mapei–Bricobi	s.t.
9	Gianluca Bortolami (ITA)	Festina–Lotus	s.t.
10	Wilfried Peeters (BEL)	Mapei–Bricobi	s.t.

General classification after Tour of Flanders

	Rider	Team	Points
1	Stefano Zanini (ITA)	Mapei–Bricobi	110
2	Emmanuel Magnien (FRA)	Française des Jeux	110
3	Johan Museeuw (BEL)	Mapei–Bricobi	100
4	Erik Zabel (GER)	Team Telekom	100
5	Andrei Tchmil (BEL)	Lotto–Mobistar	86
6	Peter Van Petegem (BEL)	TVM–Farm Frites	64
7	Michele Bartoli (ITA)	Asics–CGA	56
8	Frédéric Moncassin (FRA)	GAN	50
9	Filippo Casagrande (ITA)	Scrigno–Gaerne	32
10	Viatcheslav Ekimov (RUS)	U.S. Postal Service	32

12 April 1998 — Paris–Roubaix 266.5 km (165.6 mi)

	Rider	Team	Time
1	Franco Ballerini (ITA)	Mapei–Bricobi	6h 57' 49"
2	Andrea Tafi (ITA)	Mapei–Bricobi	+ 4' 16"
3	Wilfried Peeters (BEL)	Mapei–Bricobi	+ 4' 19"
4	Léon van Bon (NED)	Rabobank	+ 4' 49"
5	Frédéric Moncassin (FRA)	GAN	s.t.
6	Rolf Sørensen (DEN)	Rabobank	+ 4' 50"
7	Magnus Bäckstedt (SWE)	GAN	+ 4' 52"
8	Bart Leysen (BEL)	Mapei–Bricobi	+ 6' 34"
9	Gianluca Bortolami (ITA)	Festina–Lotus	s.t.
10	Henk Vogels (AUS)	GAN	s.t.

General classification after Paris–Roubaix

	Rider	Team	Points
1	Franco Ballerini (ITA)	Mapei–Bricobi	124
2	Emmanuel Magnien (FRA)	Française des Jeux	115
3	Stefano Zanini (ITA)	Mapei–Bricobi	110
4	Johan Museeuw (BEL)	Mapei–Bricobi	100
5	Erik Zabel (GER)	Team Telekom	100
6	Andrei Tchmil (BEL)	Lotto–Mobistar	99
7	Frédéric Moncassin (FRA)	GAN	86
8	Peter Van Petegem (BEL)	TVM–Farm Frites	73
9	Andrea Tafi (ITA)	Mapei–Bricobi	70
10	Wilfried Peeters (BEL)	Mapei–Bricobi	66

19 April 1998 — Liège–Bastogne–Liège 265.5 km (165.0 mi)

	Rider	Team	Time
1	Michele Bartoli (ITA)	Asics–CGA	6h 37' 29"
2	Laurent Jalabert (FRA)	ONCE	+ 1' 13"
3	Rodolfo Massi (ITA)	Casino–Ag2r	+ 1' 21"
4	Francesco Casagrande (ITA)	Cofidis	s.t.
5	Michael Boogerd (NED)	Rabobank	s.t.
6	Frank Vandenbroucke (BEL)	Mapei–Bricobi	+ 1' 35"
7	Andrea Peron (ITA)	Française des Jeux	+ 1' 44"
8	Mauro Gianetti (SUI)	Française des Jeux	+ 1' 47"
9	Maarten den Bakker (NED)	Rabobank	s.t.
10	Laurent Dufaux (SUI)	Festina–Lotus	+ 2' 04"

General classification after Liège–Bastogne–Liège

	Rider	Team	Points
1	Michele Bartoli (ITA)	Asics–CGA	156
2	Franco Ballerini (ITA)	Mapei–Bricobi	124
3	Emmanuel Magnien (FRA)	Française des Jeux	124
4	Stefano Zanini (ITA)	Mapei–Bricobi	118
5	Andrei Tchmil (BEL)	Lotto–Mobistar	105
6	Johan Museeuw (BEL)	Mapei–Bricobi	100
7	Erik Zabel (GER)	Team Telekom	100
8	Frédéric Moncassin (FRA)	GAN	86
9	Laurent Jalabert (FRA)	ONCE	81
10	Peter Van Petegem (BEL)	TVM–Farm Frites	73

25 April 1998 — Amstel Gold Race 265.5 km (165.0 mi)

	Rider	Team	Time
1	Rolf Järmann (SUI)	Casino–Ag2r	6h 43' 20"
2	Maarten den Bakker (NED)	Rabobank	s.t.
3	Michele Bartoli (ITA)	Asics–CGA	+ 21"
4	Michael Boogerd (NED)	Rabobank	s.t.
5	Bo Hamburger (DEN)	Casino–Ag2r	s.t.
6	Germano Pierdomenico (ITA)	Cantina Tollo–Alexia Alluminio	+ 32"
7	Laurent Dufaux (SUI)	Festina–Lotus	s.t.
8	Andrei Tchmil (BEL)	Lotto–Mobistar	+ 2' 27"
9	Alberto Elli (ITA)	Casino–Ag2r	s.t.
10	Andrea Ferrigato (ITA)	Vitalicio Seguros	s.t.

General classification after Amstel Gold Race

	Rider	Team	Points
1	Michele Bartoli (ITA)	Asics–CGA	206
2	Franco Ballerini (ITA)	Mapei–Bricobi	132
3	Emmanuel Magnien (FRA)	Française des Jeux	130
4	Andrei Tchmil (BEL)	Lotto–Mobistar	129
5	Stefano Zanini (ITA)	Mapei–Bricobi	118
6	Rolf Järmann (SUI)	Casino–Ag2r	110
7	Johan Museeuw (BEL)	Mapei–Bricobi	100
8	Erik Zabel (GER)	Team Telekom	100
9	Maarten den Bakker (NED)	Rabobank	98
10	Frédéric Moncassin (FRA)	GAN	86

8 August 1998 — Clásica de San Sebastián 232 km (144.2 mi)

	Rider	Team	Time
1	Francesco Casagrande (ITA)	Cofidis	5h 43' 45"
2	Axel Merckx (BEL)	Team Polti	s.t.
3	Leonardo Piepoli (ITA)	Saeco–Cannondale	+ 2"
4	Andrea Tafi (ITA)	Mapei–Bricobi	+ 1' 15"
5	Daniele Nardello (ITA)	Mapei–Bricobi	s.t.
6	Max Sciandri (GBR)	Française des Jeux	+ 1' 20"
7	Ángel Casero (ESP)	Vitalicio Seguros	s.t.
8	Léon van Bon (NED)	Rabobank	+ 1' 43"
9	Udo Bölts (GER)	Team Telekom	s.t.
10	Giuseppe Di Grande (ITA)	Mapei–Bricobi	s.t.

General classification after Clásica de San Sebastián

	Rider	Team	Points
1	Michele Bartoli (ITA)	Asics–CGA	206
2	Francesco Casagrande (ITA)	Cofidis	151
3	Franco Ballerini (ITA)	Mapei–Bricobi	132
4	Emmanuel Magnien (FRA)	Française des Jeux	130
5	Andrei Tchmil (BEL)	Lotto–Mobistar	129
6	Stefano Zanini (ITA)	Mapei–Bricobi	118
7	Rolf Järmann (SUI)	Casino–Ag2r	110
8	Andrea Tafi (ITA)	Mapei–Bricobi	110
9	Johan Museeuw (BEL)	Mapei–Bricobi	100
10	Erik Zabel (GER)	Team Telekom	100

16 August 1998 — HEW Cyclassics 253 km (157.2 mi)

	Rider	Team	Time
1	Léon van Bon (NED)	Rabobank	6h 09' 31"
2	Michele Bartoli (ITA)	Asics–CGA	s.t.
3	Ludo Dierckxsens (BEL)	Lotto–Mobistar	s.t.
4	Salvatore Commesso (ITA)	Saeco–Cannondale	s.t.
5	Nico Mattan (BEL)	Mapei–Bricobi	s.t.
6	Christophe Mengin (FRA)	Française des Jeux	s.t.
7	Michael Rich (GER)	Saeco–Cannondale	s.t.
8	Christian Wegmann (GER)	Die Continentale-Olympia	s.t.
9	Jan Ullrich (GER)	Team Telekom	s.t.
10	Paul Van Hyfte (BEL)	Lotto–Mobistar	s.t.

General classification after HEW Cyclassics

	Rider	Team	Points
1	Michele Bartoli (ITA)	Asics–CGA	276
2	Léon van Bon (NED)	Rabobank	181
3	Francesco Casagrande (ITA)	Cofidis	151
4	Franco Ballerini (ITA)	Mapei–Bricobi	132
5	Emmanuel Magnien (FRA)	Française des Jeux	130
6	Andrei Tchmil (BEL)	Lotto–Mobistar	129
7	Stefano Zanini (ITA)	Mapei–Bricobi	118
8	Rolf Järmann (SUI)	Casino–Ag2r	110
9	Andrea Tafi (ITA)	Mapei–Bricobi	110
10	Erik Zabel (GER)	Team Telekom	104

22 August 1998 — Grand Prix de Suisse 243 km (151.0 mi)

	Rider	Team	Time
1	Michele Bartoli (ITA)	Asics–CGA	6h 09' 24"
2	Frank Vandenbroucke (BEL)	Mapei–Bricobi	s.t.
3	Salvatore Commesso (ITA)	Saeco–Cannondale	s.t.
4	Andrea Tafi (ITA)	Mapei–Bricobi	s.t.
5	Bobby Julich (USA)	Cofidis	s.t.
6	Massimiliano Gentili (ITA)	Cantina Tollo–Alexia Alluminio	s.t.
7	Davide Rebellin (ITA)	Team Polti	s.t.
8	Paolo Bettini (ITA)	Asics–CGA	s.t.
9	Dario Frigo (ITA)	Saeco–Cannondale	+ 12"
10	Fabio Baldato (ITA)	Riso Scotti–MG Maglificio	+ 23"

General classification after Grand Prix de Suisse

	Rider	Team	Points
1	Michele Bartoli (ITA)	Asics–CGA	376
2	Léon van Bon (NED)	Rabobank	181
3	Francesco Casagrande (ITA)	Cofidis	151
4	Andrea Tafi (ITA)	Mapei–Bricobi	150
5	Andrei Tchmil (BEL)	Lotto–Mobistar	135
6	Franco Ballerini (ITA)	Mapei–Bricobi	132
7	Emmanuel Magnien (FRA)	Française des Jeux	130
8	Stefano Zanini (ITA)	Mapei–Bricobi	123
9	Frank Vandenbroucke (BEL)	Mapei–Bricobi	111
10	Rolf Järmann (SUI)	Casino–Ag2r	110

4 October 1998 — Paris–Tours 254 km (157.8 mi)

	Rider	Team	Time
1	Jacky Durand (FRA)	Casino–Ag2r	5h 45' 14"
2	Mirco Gualdi (ITA)	Team Polti	+ 2"
3	Jaan Kirsipuu (EST)	Casino–Ag2r	+ 31"
4	Stefano Zanini (ITA)	Mapei–Bricobi	s.t.
5	Nicola Minali (ITA)	Riso Scotti–MG Maglificio	s.t.
6	Max van Heeswijk (NED)	Rabobank	s.t.
7	Alessandro Bertolini (ITA)	Cofidis	s.t.
8	Jo Planckaert (BEL)	Lotto–Mobistar	s.t.
9	André Korff (GER)	Festina–Lotus	s.t.
10	Jean-Patrick Nazon (FRA)	Française des Jeux	+ 32"

General classification after Paris–Tours

	Rider	Team	Points
1	Michele Bartoli (ITA)	Asics–CGA	376
2	Léon van Bon (NED)	Rabobank	190
3	Stefano Zanini (ITA)	Mapei–Bricobi	163
4	Andrea Tafi (ITA)	Mapei–Bricobi	150
5	Andrei Tchmil (BEL)	Lotto–Mobistar	137
6	Franco Ballerini (ITA)	Mapei–Bricobi	132
7	Emmanuel Magnien (FRA)	Française des Jeux	130
8	Rolf Järmann (SUI)	Casino–Ag2r	111
9	Frank Vandenbroucke (BEL)	Mapei–Bricobi	111
10	Erik Zabel (GER)	Team Telekom	104

17 October 1998 — Giro di Lombardia 253 km (157.2 mi)

	Rider	Team	Time
1	Oscar Camenzind (SUI)	Mapei–Bricobi	5h 59' 01"
2	Michael Boogerd (NED)	Rabobank	+ 6"
3	Felice Puttini (SUI)	Ros Mary–Amica Chips	+ 1' 21"
4	Michele Bartoli (ITA)	Asics–CGA	s.t.
5	Pascal Richard (SUI)	Casino–Ag2r	s.t.
6	Gilberto Simoni (ITA)	Cantina Tollo–Alexia Alluminio	+ 1' 57"
7	Marco Serpellini (ITA)	Brescialat–Liquigas	+ 3' 50"
8	Markus Zberg (SUI)	Post Swiss Team	s.t.
9	Andrei Zintchenko (RUS)	Vitalicio Seguros	s.t.
10	Andrea Tafi (ITA)	Mapei–Bricobi	s.t.

General classification after Giro di Lombardia

	Rider	Team	Points
1	Michele Bartoli (ITA)	Asics–CGA	416
2	Léon van Bon (NED)	Rabobank	190
3	Andrea Tafi (ITA)	Mapei–Bricobi	166
4	Stefano Zanini (ITA)	Mapei–Bricobi	163
5	Michael Boogerd (NED)	Rabobank	146
6	Andrei Tchmil (BEL)	Lotto–Mobistar	137
7	Emmanuel Magnien (FRA)	Française des Jeux	134
8	Franco Ballerini (ITA)	Mapei–Bricobi	132
9	Rolf Järmann (SUI)	Casino–Ag2r	111
10	Frank Vandenbroucke (BEL)	Mapei–Bricobi	111

== Final standings ==
=== Individual ===
Points are awarded to the top 25 classified riders. Riders must start at least 6 races to be classified.

The points are awarded for every race using the following system:

Position	1st	2nd	3rd	4th	5th	6th	7th	8th	9th	10th	11th	12th	13th	14th	15th	16th	17th	18th	19th	20th	21st	22nd	23rd	24th	25th
Points	100	70	50	40	36	32	28	24	20	16	15	14	13	12	11	10	9	8	7	6	5	4	3	2	1

Pos.	Rider	Team	MSR	ToF	ROU	LBL	AGR	CSS	HEW	SUI	TOU	LOM	Pts.
1	Michele Bartoli (ITA)	Asics–CGA	24	32	DNS	100	50	0	70	100	0	40	416
2	Léon van Bon (NED)	Rabobank	5	0	40	DNS	12	24	100	0	9	DNS	190
3	Andrea Tafi (ITA)	Mapei–Bricobi	0	0	70	DNS	0	40	0	40	DNS	16	166
4	Stefano Zanini (ITA)	Mapei–Bricobi	40	70	0	8	0	0	DNS	5	40	0	163
5	Michael Boogerd (NED)	Rabobank	0	DNS	DNS	36	40	0	DNS	0	0	70	146
6	Andrei Tchmil (BEL)	Lotto–Mobistar	36	50	13	6	24	0	0	6	2	0	137
7	Emmanuel Magnien (FRA)	Française des Jeux	70	40	5	9	6	0	0	0	0	4	134
8	Franco Ballerini (ITA)	Mapei–Bricobi	0	24	100	0	8	0	0	0	DNS	DNS	132
9	Rolf Järmann (SUI)	Casino–Ag2r	10	0	DNS	0	100	DNS	0	0	1	0	111
10	Frank Vandenbroucke (BEL)	Mapei–Bricobi	0	0	DNS	32	4	5	0	70	DNS	DNS	111
11	Maarten den Bakker (NED)	Rabobank	0	8	DNS	20	70	0	0	0	0	0	98
12	Peter Van Petegem (BEL)	TVM–Farm Frites	28	36	9	0	5	0	0	13	DNS	DNS	91
13	Salvatore Commesso (ITA)	Saeco–Cannondale	DNS	0	0	DNS	DNS	DNS	40	50	0	0	90
14	Axel Merckx (BEL)	Team Polti	0	DNS	DNS	0	0	70	0	0	DNS	DNS	70
15	Davide Rebellin (ITA)	Team Polti	13	DNS	DNS	DNS	DNS	14	0	28	0	14	69
16	Ludo Dierckxsens (BEL)	Lotto–Mobistar	0	0	14	DNS	DNS	DNS	50	0	0	0	64
17	Fabio Baldato (ITA)	Riso Scotti–MG Maglificio	DNS	13	0	DNS	14	0	DNS	16	12	0	55
18	Alberto Elli (ITA)	Casino–Ag2r	16	0	DNS	5	20	4	0	9	0	0	54
19	Andrea Peron (ITA)	Française des Jeux	0	DNS	DNS	28	10	DNS	10	0	0	0	48
20	Mirko Celestino (ITA)	Team Polti	14	5	DNS	4	15	DNS	0	0	DNS	10	48
Race winners not eligible for general classification
Pos.	Rider	Team	MSR	ToF	ROU	LBL	AGR	CSS	HEW	SUI	TOU	LOM	Pts.
-	Francesco Casagrande (ITA)	Cofidis	DNS	DNS	DNS	40	11	100	0	DNS	DNS	DNS	151
-	Erik Zabel (GER)	Team Telekom	100	0	0	DNS	0	DNS	4	DNS	DNS	DNS	104
-	Johan Museeuw (BEL)	Mapei–Bricobi	0	100	0	DNS	DNS	DNS	DNS	DNS	DNS	DNS	100
-	Jacky Durand (FRA)	Casino–Ag2r	DNS	0	0	DNS	DNS	DNS	DNS	DNS	100	DNS	100
-	Oscar Camenzind (SUI)	Mapei–Bricobi	DNS	DNS	DNS	DNS	DNS	DNS	DNS	DNS	DNS	100	100

Key
Colour	Result
Gold	Winner
Silver	2nd place
Bronze	3rd place
Green	Top ten position
Blue	Other points position
Purple	Out of points, retired
Red	Did not start (DNS)

=== Teams ===
Points are awarded to the top 10 teams. Teams must start at least 8 races to be classified. The first 18 teams in world ranking must start in all races.

The points are awarded for every race using the following system:

Position	1st	2nd	3rd	4th	5th	6th	7th	8th	9th	10th
Points	12	9	8	7	6	5	4	3	2	1

Pos.	Teams	MSR	ToF	ROU	LBL	AGR	CSS	HEW	SUI	TOU	LOM	Pts.
1	Mapei–Bricobi	4	12	12	8	8	12	0	12	8	0	76
2	Rabobank	3	6	8	7	9	3	5	0	6	8	56
3	Casino–Ag2r	12	0	0	9	12	0	0	0	12	7	52
4	Team Polti	9	4	0	3	4	8	2	5	3	12	50
5	Française des Jeux	6	9	0	12	7	0	6	0	0	0	40
