= 1998 Liège–Bastogne–Liège =

1998 UCI Road World Cup, race 4

Race details
- Dates: 19 April 1998
- Distance: 265.5 km (165.0 mi)
- Winning time: 6h 37' 29"

Results
| | Winner | Michele Bartoli (ITA) | (Asics–CGA) |
| | Second | Laurent Jalabert (FRA) | (ONCE) |
| | Third | Rodolfo Massi (ITA) | (Casino–Ag2r) |

The 84th running of the Liège–Bastogne–Liège cycling classic was held on 19 April 1998. It was the fourth leg of the 1998 UCI Road World Cup, coming between Paris–Roubaix and the Amstel Gold Race. Italian Michele Bartoli won the race, for the second year running, after a solo attack at 16 km (9.9 mi) from the finish. As in the previous edition, Frenchman Laurent Jalabert was second; Rodolfo Massi completed the podium. 102 of 193 riders finished the race.

== Race Summary ==
Russian Evgeni Berzin, winner of the 1994 Liège–Bastogne–Liège, moved away from the peloton after 200 km (120 mi) and held a maximum lead of one minute over the chasing pack. On the Côte de La Redoute, seven riders broke clear from the field: Michele Bartoli and Laurent Jalabert – winner and runner-up of 1997 – Frank Vandenbroucke, Michael Boogerd, Rodolfo Massi, Francesco Casagrande and Laurent Dufaux. Bartoli attacked at 16 km (9.9 mi) from the finish and caught Berzin on the Côte de Sart Tilman in Angleur. Jalabert counterattacked in the final kilometres, but was unable to join Bartoli, who soloed to his second consecutive win in La Doyenne.

== Result ==
Result (top 10)
| Rank | Rider | Team | Time |
|---|---|---|---|
| 1 | Michele Bartoli (ITA) | Asics–CGA | 6h 37' 29" |
| 2 | Laurent Jalabert (FRA) | ONCE | + 1' 13" |
| 3 | Rodolfo Massi (ITA) | Casino–Ag2r | + 1' 21" |
| 4 | Francesco Casagrande (ITA) | Cofidis | s.t. |
| 5 | Michael Boogerd (NED) | Rabobank | s.t. |
| 6 | Frank Vandenbroucke (BEL) | Mapei–Bricobi | + 1' 35" |
| 7 | Andrea Peron (ITA) | Française des Jeux | + 1' 44" |
| 8 | Mauro Gianetti (SUI) | Française des Jeux | + 1' 47" |
| 9 | Maarten den Bakker (NED) | Rabobank | s.t. |
| 10 | Laurent Dufaux (SUI) | Festina–Lotus | + 2' 04" |
