= 2010 Tirreno–Adriatico =

2010 UCI World Ranking, race 3 of 26

Race details
- Dates: 10–16 March 2010
- Stages: 7
- Distance: 1,229 km (764 mi)
- Winning time: 30h 52' 32"

Results
Jersey awarded to the overall winner	Winner	Stefano Garzelli (ITA)	(Acqua & Sapone)
	Second	Michele Scarponi (ITA)	(Androni Giocattoli)
	Third	Cadel Evans (AUS)	(BMC Racing Team)
Jersey awarded to the points classification winner	Points	Stefano Garzelli (ITA)	(Acqua & Sapone)
Jersey awarded to the mountains classification winner	Mountains	Dmytro Grabovskyy (UKR)	(ISD–NERI)
Jersey awarded to the youth classification winner	Youth	Robert Gesink (NED)	(Rabobank)
	Team	Lampre–Farnese Vini	

The 2010 Tirreno–Adriatico was the 45th running of the Tirreno–Adriatico stage race. It started on 10 March and finished on 16 March. The race started in Livorno and ended San Benedetto del Tronto. The race was won by Stefano Garzelli after gaining 2 seconds in intermediate sprints in the last stage which tied him for first with Michele Scarponi; Garzelli held the tiebreaker, combined stage finishes.

== Teams ==
Twenty-two teams started the race. These included sixteen UCI ProTour teams, including the provisionally-licensed Lampre–Farnese Vini, and six UCI Professional Continental teams. These teams, along with three others, also contested Milan–San Remo.

The 22 teams participating in the race were:

- Acqua & Sapone
- Ag2r–La Mondiale
- Androni Giocattoli
- Astana
- BMC Racing Team
- Caisse d'Epargne
- Cervélo TestTeam
- Colnago–CSF Inox
- Euskaltel–Euskadi
- Française des Jeux
- Garmin–Transitions
- ISD–NERI
- Lampre–Farnese Vini
- Liquigas–Doimo
- Omega Pharma–Lotto
- Quick-Step
- Rabobank
- Team HTC–Columbia
- Team Katusha
- Team Milram
- Team Saxo Bank
- Team Sky

== Stages ==
=== Stage 1 ===
10 March 2010 – Livorno to Rosignano Solvay, 148 km (92 mi)

The race of two seas began with a mostly flat stage from Livorno on the Tyrrhenian coast to Rosignano Solvay. The riders took a finishing circuit in the arrival town, seeing the finish line twice.

A lone rider from ISD–NERI comprised this stage's major breakaway. Dmytro Grabovskyy slipped away early and quickly built an advantage of over five minutes. The peloton, battered by the freezing rain that almost kept the stage from being run at all, was content to let him stay away until the 40 km (25 mi) to go mark, when the Liquigas–Doimo and Garmin–Transitions teams set to bringing him back in the hopes of setting up a potential mass sprint finish for their top sprinters Daniele Bennati and Tyler Farrar.

Grabovskyy was caught with 22 km (14 mi) left to race, and Euskaltel–Euskadi's Pablo Urtasun took the opportunity to counter-attack, being joined after a short while by Niki Terpstra from Team Milram. They were away until the 8 km (5.0 mi) to go mark, and another move took shape when they were caught, including Terpstra's team leader Linus Gerdemann and Matti Breschel. Despite never holding even ten seconds advantage over the main field, and not having an appreciable gap over them at the finish line, they were able to contest the stage among themselves and deny the pure sprinters the chance. Gerdemann came around Pablo Lastras' early leadout to take the stage win and the first blue jersey as race leader. With the time bonus at the finish line, he became the first leader of the race with a four-second advantage over Lastras. Gerdemann was also awarded the red jersey as points classification leader; Lastras wore it during stage two.

Stage 1 results

	Cyclist	Team	Time
1	Linus Gerdemann (GER)	Team Milram	3h 36' 15"
2	Pablo Lastras (ESP)	Caisse d'Epargne	s.t.
3	Matti Breschel (DEN)	Team Saxo Bank	s.t.
4	Luca Paolini (ITA)	Acqua & Sapone	s.t.
5	Yauheni Hutarovich (BLR)	Française des Jeux	s.t.
6	José Joaquín Rojas (ESP)	Caisse d'Epargne	s.t.
7	Tyler Farrar (USA)	Garmin–Transitions	s.t.
8	Marco Bandiera (ITA)	Team Katusha	s.t.
9	Simon Clarke (AUS)	ISD–NERI	s.t.
10	Francesco Ginanni (ITA)	Androni Giocattoli	s.t.

General Classification after Stage 1

	Cyclist	Team	Time
1	Linus Gerdemann (GER)	Team Milram	3h 36' 05"
2	Pablo Lastras (ESP)	Caisse d'Epargne	+ 4"
3	Matti Breschel (DEN)	Team Saxo Bank	+ 6"
4	Fabian Wegmann (GER)	Team Milram	+ 8"
5	Cadel Evans (AUS)	BMC Racing Team	+ 9"
6	Luca Paolini (ITA)	Acqua & Sapone	+ 10"
7	Yauheni Hutarovich (BLR)	Française des Jeux	+ 10"
8	José Joaquín Rojas (ESP)	Caisse d'Epargne	+ 10"
9	Tyler Farrar (USA)	Garmin–Transitions	+ 10"
10	Marco Bandiera (ITA)	Team Katusha	+ 10"

=== Stage 2 ===
11 March 2010 – Montecatini Terme, 165 km (103 mi)

Stage two contained a categorized climb after just 6 km (3.7 mi), but following the descent from that climb the course was a plateau with no further raises in elevation of any consequence. The stage started and ended in the same town, and concluded with a 5-lap circuit with repeated visits to a short hill.

Four riders again tried their luck to contest the stage win among themselves in a breakaway, but on this day the sprinters would not be denied. The four were Mikhail Ignatiev, Diego Caccia, Alan Pérez, and Alan Marangoni, who escaped 11 km (6.8 mi) into the stage. They built up an advantage of over four minutes, while race leader Linus Gerdemann's Milram team rode a tempo at the front of the peloton. Various teams representing strong sprinters worked to reel in the escape toward the end of the stage, and three of them were caught 3.5 km (2.2 mi) from the finish line. Ignatiev tried to counter-attack as the catch occurred, but the blazing speed with which Liquigas–Doimo was driving the peloton at the time meant that it was only a few seconds until the Russian too was brought back. Liquigas–Doimo led out the sprint in the final kilometer, but their top sprinter Daniele Bennati was unable to take advantage. Belgian national champion Tom Boonen began his sprint first, but was able to hold on to the finish line for the win. The win, and the time bonus it afforded, left Boonen tied with Gerdemann on time in the general classification.

Stage 2 results

	Cyclist	Team	Time
1	Tom Boonen (BEL)	Quick-Step	4h 14' 13"
2	Paul Martens (GER)	Rabobank	s.t.
3	Daniele Bennati (ITA)	Liquigas–Doimo	s.t.
4	Robbie McEwen (AUS)	Team Katusha	s.t.
5	José Joaquín Rojas (ESP)	Caisse d'Epargne	s.t.
6	Francesco Ginanni (ITA)	Androni Giocattoli	s.t.
7	Sacha Modolo (ITA)	Colnago–CSF Inox	s.t.
8	Danilo Hondo (GER)	Lampre–Farnese Vini	s.t.
9	Sébastien Hinault (FRA)	Ag2r–La Mondiale	s.t.
10	Alexander Vinokourov (KAZ)	Astana	s.t.

General Classification after Stage 2

	Cyclist	Team	Time
1	Linus Gerdemann (GER)	Team Milram	7h 50' 18"
2	Tom Boonen (BEL)	Quick-Step	+ 0"
3	Pablo Lastras (ESP)	Caisse d'Epargne	+ 4"
4	Paul Martens (GER)	Rabobank	+ 4"
5	Alan Pérez (ESP)	Euskaltel–Euskadi	+ 4"
6	Matti Breschel (DEN)	Team Saxo Bank	+ 6"
7	Daniele Bennati (ITA)	Liquigas–Doimo	+ 6"
8	Fabian Wegmann (GER)	Team Milram	+ 8"
9	Cadel Evans (AUS)	BMC Racing Team	+ 9"
10	José Joaquín Rojas (ESP)	Caisse d'Epargne	+ 10"

=== Stage 3 ===
12 March 2010 – San Miniato to Monsummano Terme, 159 km (99 mi)

Stage 3 was the last in Tuscany. This course had two categorized climbs in the final 30 km (19 mi) before the peloton reaches Monsummano Terme. There were three uncategorized rises in elevation before that point, and a lengthy flat stretch to the finish.

The day's escapees were Sebastian Lang, Cameron Wurf, and Diego Caccia. By virtue of being in the breakaway for the second day in a row, Caccia took the lead in the mountains classification after the stage from his teammate Dmytro Grabovskyy. Wurf was the last of them to be caught, on the final climb of the day. The main field was all together for a sprint finish, but this was nearly not the case, as ten riders broke away on the descent from the last climb, including overall contenders like defending champion Michele Scarponi, last year's runner-up Stefano Garzelli, and the Liquigas–Doimo duo of Vincenzo Nibali and Roman Kreuziger. This breakaway group had 18 seconds on the main field with 5 km (3.1 mi) left to race, but they were unable to ride as cohesively as the peloton, who caught them just before they reached the red kite indicating 1 km (0.62 mi) to the finish line. Just as they had the previous day, the Liquigas–Doimo squad executed an efficient leadout for their top sprinter Daniele Bennati. Unlike the previous day, Bennati used it to his full advantage, winning the stage over Alessandro Petacchi, Bernhard Eisel, and Tyler Farrar. The time bonus at the line made Bennati the new race leader. He also took the lead in the points classification – previous race leader Linus Gerdemann dons the red jersey for stage 4.

Stage 3 results

	Cyclist	Team	Time
1	Daniele Bennati (ITA)	Liquigas–Doimo	3h 53' 09"
2	Alessandro Petacchi (ITA)	Lampre–Farnese Vini	s.t.
3	Bernhard Eisel (AUT)	Team HTC–Columbia	s.t.
4	Tyler Farrar (USA)	Garmin–Transitions	s.t.
5	Juan Antonio Flecha (ESP)	Team Sky	s.t.
6	Sacha Modolo (ITA)	Colnago–CSF Inox	s.t.
7	Assan Bazayev (KAZ)	Astana	s.t.
8	Edvald Boasson Hagen (NOR)	Team Sky	s.t.
9	Francesco Ginanni (ITA)	Androni Giocattoli	s.t.
10	Matti Breschel (DEN)	Team Saxo Bank	s.t.

General Classification after Stage 3

	Cyclist	Team	Time
1	Daniele Bennati (ITA)	Liquigas–Doimo	11h 44' 23"
2	Linus Gerdemann (GER)	Team Milram	+ 4"
3	Tom Boonen (BEL)	Quick-Step	+ 4"
4	Pablo Lastras (ESP)	Caisse d'Epargne	+ 8"
5	Paul Martens (GER)	Rabobank	+ 8"
6	Alessandro Petacchi (ITA)	Lampre–Farnese Vini	+ 8"
7	Alan Pérez (ESP)	Euskaltel–Euskadi	+ 8"
8	Matti Breschel (DEN)	Team Saxo Bank	+ 10"
9	Cadel Evans (AUS)	BMC Racing Team	+ 13"
10	José Joaquín Rojas (ESP)	Caisse d'Epargne	+ 14"

=== Stage 4 ===
13 March 2010 – San Gemini to Chieti, 243 km (151 mi)

The profile for this long stage, entering the region of Abruzzo, is bumpy, with many climbs, both categorized and uncategorized. The riders head east and slightly to the south to Chieti and will nearly reach the Adriatic Sea. The final 3 km (1.9 mi) are especially difficult, with stretches containing maximum gradients of 19%.

The peloton reeled in many early attacks on this stage, and the day's principal breakaway did not form until 34 km (21 mi) had been covered. The seven escapees were Rubén Pérez, Vasil Kiryienka, Marco Frapporti, Maarten Wynants, Paolo Longo Borghini, Vladimir Efimkin, and Italian national champion Filippo Pozzato, who did much of the pacemaking for the group. Their biggest advantage over the main field was 8'30", at the halfway point of the stage. BMC Racing Team and Acqua & Sapone did the majority of the pacemaking at the front of the peloton, as overnight race leader Daniele Bennati was quickly dropped on this stage, eventually finishing 12 minutes back of the stage winner.

The break still had 3 minutes on the main field with 25 km (16 mi) left to race, though several riders tried escapes from the peloton before the breakaway was caught, indicating that they did not believe the group could stay away. Astana riders Alexander Vinokourov and Enrico Gasparotto both tried their luck, but could neither stay away nor bridge to the leaders. Vincenzo Nibali then attacked, and drew with him defending Tirreno–Adriatico champion Michele Scarponi. In the lead of the race, Kiryienka dropped his remaining breakaway companions and tried to solo to the line inside of the last 5 km (3.1 mi). Nibali and Scarponi quickly absorbed all of them, and at that point had Maxim Iglinsky and Stefano Garzelli in tow in their leading group. No one could answer Scarponi's subsequent attack, which gave him the stage win and the blue jersey. He finished 14 seconds the better of Benoît Vaugrenard, who had come up from what remained of the main field to finish with Garzelli's group. Due to the narrow, twisting roads on which the stage finished, Vaugrenard had not seen Scarponi cross the finish line, and he thought he had won the stage when he led his group across the line. Nibali was unable to maintain the pace of this group and lost a further 7 seconds to them, finishing 21 back of Scarponi.

Stage 4 results

	Cyclist	Team	Time
1	Michele Scarponi (ITA)	Androni Giocattoli	6h 23' 47"
2	Benoît Vaugrenard (FRA)	Française des Jeux	+ 14"
3	Leonardo Bertagnolli (ITA)	Androni Giocattoli	+ 14"
4	Stefano Garzelli (ITA)	Acqua & Sapone	+ 14"
5	Rigoberto Urán (COL)	Caisse d'Epargne	+ 14"
6	Maxim Iglinsky (KAZ)	Astana	+ 17"
7	Robert Gesink (NED)	Rabobank	+ 17"
8	Cadel Evans (AUS)	BMC Racing Team	+ 17"
9	Domenico Pozzovivo (ITA)	Colnago–CSF Inox	+ 19"
10	Michael Rogers (AUS)	Team HTC–Columbia	+ 19"

General Classification after Stage 4

	Cyclist	Team	Time
1	Michele Scarponi (ITA)	Androni Giocattoli	18h 08' 14"
2	Benoît Vaugrenard (FRA)	Française des Jeux	+ 18"
3	Leonardo Bertagnolli (ITA)	Androni Giocattoli	+ 20"
4	Stefano Garzelli (ITA)	Acqua & Sapone	+ 24"
5	Rigoberto Urán (COL)	Caisse d'Epargne	+ 24"
6	Cadel Evans (AUS)	BMC Racing Team	+ 26"
7	Maxim Iglinsky (KAZ)	Astana	+ 27"
8	Robert Gesink (NED)	Rabobank	+ 27"
9	Michael Rogers (AUS)	Team HTC–Columbia	+ 29"
10	Domenico Pozzovivo (ITA)	Colnago–CSF Inox	+ 29"

=== Stage 5 ===
14 March 2010 – Chieti to Colmurano, 216 km (134 mi)

The first half of this stage, which saw the peloton ride directly alongside the Adriatic coast, was flat, but the second half contained several climbs. The final 18 km (11 mi) were removed from the course due to poor road conditions, leaving out the originally scheduled final climb, one that reaches a 20% maximum grade. The resultant course featured a smaller, but still difficult, summit finish.

An eleven-rider breakaway formed early in the stage, but it did not come close to staying away, as only Marco Pinotti from this group was out front for any length of time. He was caught with a good 55 km (34 mi) left to race. Race leader Michele Scarponi's Androni Giocattoli team set a furious pace to control the main field, even though two of its riders crashed hard. José Serpa finished the stage, continuing to take pulls at the front of the main field, covered in dirt with a blood-streaked face meagerly patched up by a bandage. A counter-attack from Juan José Oroz as the time Pinotti was caught got the Basque rider clear for most of the remainder of the stage. Astana's Enrico Gasparotto bridged across to him just before the short but nearly vertical climb to Colmurano which concluded the stage. Cadel Evans, Stefano Garzelli and Maxim Iglinsky next bridged from the Scarponi group to the leaders, and Evans tapped out a pace to get them to the finish line first. Despite having been in the flats in his bridge up to Oroz, Gasparotto still had the legs to come around Evans and claim the stage win. Scarponi retained the overall lead, but his advantage was narrowed.

Stage 5 results

	Cyclist	Team	Time
1	Enrico Gasparotto (ITA)	Astana	5h 32' 22"
2	Stefano Garzelli (ITA)	Acqua & Sapone	s.t.
3	Maxim Iglinskiy (KAZ)	Astana	s.t.
4	Cadel Evans (AUS)	BMC Racing Team	s.t.
5	Vincenzo Nibali (ITA)	Liquigas–Doimo	+ 8"
6	Robert Gesink (NED)	Rabobank	+ 8"
7	Manuele Mori (ITA)	Lampre–Farnese Vini	+ 8"
8	Michael Rogers (AUS)	Team HTC–Columbia	+ 8"
9	Michele Scarponi (ITA)	Androni Giocattoli	+ 8"
10	Domenico Pozzovivo (ITA)	Colnago–CSF Inox	+ 8"

General Classification after Stage 5

	Cyclist	Team	Time
1	Michele Scarponi (ITA)	Androni Giocattoli	23h 40' 44"
2	Stefano Garzelli (ITA)	Acqua & Sapone	+ 10"
3	Maxim Iglinsky (KAZ)	Astana	+ 15"
4	Cadel Evans (AUS)	BMC Racing Team	+ 18"
5	Robert Gesink (NED)	Rabobank	+ 27"
6	Michael Rogers (AUS)	Team HTC–Columbia	+ 29"
7	Domenico Pozzovivo (ITA)	Colnago–CSF Inox	+ 29"
8	Vincenzo Nibali (ITA)	Liquigas–Doimo	+ 31"
9	Leonardo Bertagnolli (ITA)	Androni Giocattoli	+ 48"
10	Manuele Mori (ITA)	Lampre–Farnese Vini	+ 53"

=== Stage 6 ===
15 March 2010 – Montecosaro to Macerata, 134 km (83 mi)

Stage six is hilly, concluding with a 4-lap circuit that involves a visit to the Macerata climb each lap. The first and third laps will count the climb towards the mountains classification, while for the second pass it will be considered an intermediate sprint.

Twelve riders from twelve teams broke away at the 8 km (5.0 mi) mark. The best-placed riders in this group were Paul Martens of Rabobank and Simon Špilak from Lampre–Farnese Vini, respectively 1'36" and 1'48" back of race leader Michele Scarponi as the day began. The significance of 12 different teams being represented in the break was that Scarponi's Androni Giocattoli team did not get much help in setting a pace for the peloton to bring them back, as teams do not normally help chase down breakaways when they have a rider in them. Androni Giocattoli rode a deliberate pace for much of the stage, with the breakaway's time gap hovering at around two minutes most of the day. As the end of the stage neared, the main field had closed the gap to under a minute, meaning Martens and Špilak did not stand to threaten Scarponi's overall lead. This caused Androni Giocattoli to ease up on their pace, but they nonetheless absorbed 11 of the breakaway riders before the finish, since the hilly parcours did not suit most of those riders. The one who got away was Team Katusha's Mikhail Ignatiev, a time trial specialist who shed his breakaway mates with 8 km (5.0 mi) remaining and was able to pace himself to the line for the stage win. A hectic final kilometer for the race's top contenders was resolved when Stefano Garzelli and Cadel Evans broke away from a small group containing Scarponi. They finished 2 seconds better than the race leader, but more importantly, both won time bonuses. Scarponi retained the race leader's blue jersey heading into the final day, but by a margin of just 2 seconds to Garzelli and 12 to Evans.

Stage 6 results

	Cyclist	Team	Time
1	Mikhail Ignatiev (RUS)	Team Katusha	3h 18' 09"
2	Stefano Garzelli (ITA)	Acqua & Sapone	+ 5"
3	Cadel Evans (AUS)	BMC Racing Team	+ 5"
4	Robert Gesink (NED)	Rabobank	+ 7"
5	Benoît Vaugrenard (FRA)	Française des Jeux	+ 7"
6	Michele Scarponi (ITA)	Androni Giocattoli	+ 7"
7	Michael Rogers (AUS)	Team HTC–Columbia	+ 7"
8	Francesco Gavazzi (ITA)	Lampre–Farnese Vini	+ 9"
9	Domenico Pozzovivo (ITA)	Colnago–CSF Inox	+ 11"
10	Rigoberto Urán (COL)	Caisse d'Epargne	+ 11"

General Classification after Stage 6

	Cyclist	Team	Time
1	Michele Scarponi (ITA)	Androni Giocattoli	26h 59' 00"
2	Stefano Garzelli (ITA)	Acqua & Sapone	+ 2"
3	Cadel Evans (AUS)	BMC Racing Team	+ 12"
4	Maxim Iglinsky (KAZ)	Astana	+ 22"
5	Robert Gesink (NED)	Rabobank	+ 27"
6	Michael Rogers (AUS)	Team HTC–Columbia	+ 29"
7	Domenico Pozzovivo (ITA)	Colnago–CSF Inox	+ 33"
8	Vincenzo Nibali (ITA)	Liquigas–Doimo	+ 42"
9	Manuele Mori (ITA)	Lampre–Farnese Vini	+ 1' 04"
10	Francesco Gavazzi (ITA)	Lampre–Farnese Vini	+ 1' 07"

=== Stage 7 ===
16 March 2010 – Civitanova Marche to San Benedetto del Tronto, 164 km (102 mi)

The first 60 km (37 mi) of this course contained two categorized climbs, but from that point on the stage was perfectly flat to the finish. The race concluded with a seven-lap circuit in San Benedetto del Tronto, with intermediate sprint points available on the third and fifth laps.

Decathlon CMA CGM Team rider Blel Kadri formed a solo breakaway soon after the true beginning of the stage. He stayed out front for 100 km (62 mi). With the intermediate sprints affording 3, 2, and 1 bonus seconds, Acqua & Sapone had a vested interest in chasing him down, since the sprints could move their team leader Stefano Garzelli past Michele Scarponi for the race's overall classification. The first sprint took place 40 km (25 mi) from the end of the stage. Francesco Ginanni won the first sprint, ahead of José Joaquín Rojas and Garzelli. This put Garzelli one second behind Scarponi. In the second intermediate sprint, 20 km (12 mi) from the line, Ginanni and Androni Giocattoli teammate Jackson Rodríguez easily took the first two places, but Acqua & Sapone successfully led Garzelli out to again get third. This left the two exactly tied on time, but Garzelli held the tiebreaker for better stage placings over the course of all seven days of racing. While 10, 6, and 4 bonus seconds were available for the first three across the finish line, neither team figured to be able to control the upcoming mass sprint. This meant Garzelli had won the race's overall classification by the thinnest of margins.

The teams of the sprinters came forward in the final 10 km (6.2 mi) to set up the finale. Mark Cavendish, who had missed out on the previous sprint finishes, crashed hard with 8 km (5.0 mi) and missed an opportunity to contest this sprint. Assan Bazayev and Rui Costa also crashed. Team Sky controlled the race in the final kilometer, and delivered Edvald Boasson Hagen to the line in first position.

Stage 7 results

	Cyclist	Team	Time
1	Edvald Boasson Hagen (NOR)	Team Sky	3h 52' 36"
2	Alessandro Petacchi (ITA)	Lampre–Farnese Vini	s.t.
3	Sacha Modolo (ITA)	Colnago–CSF Inox	s.t.
4	Bernhard Eisel (AUT)	Team HTC–Columbia	s.t.
5	Mattia Gavazzi (ITA)	Colnago–CSF Inox	s.t.
6	Tyler Farrar (USA)	Garmin–Transitions	s.t.
7	Robbie McEwen (AUS)	Team Katusha	s.t.
8	Baden Cooke (AUS)	Team Saxo Bank	s.t.
9	Yauheni Hutarovich (BLR)	Française des Jeux	s.t.
10	Robert Hunter (RSA)	Garmin–Transitions	s.t.

=== General classification ===
	Cyclist	Team	Time
1	Stefano Garzelli (ITA)	Acqua & Sapone	30h 51' 36"
2	Michele Scarponi (ITA)	Androni Giocattoli	+ 0"
3	Cadel Evans (AUS)	BMC Racing Team	+ 12"
4	Maxim Iglinsky (KAZ)	Astana	+ 22"
5	Robert Gesink (NED)	Rabobank	+ 27"
6	Michael Rogers (AUS)	Team HTC–Columbia	+ 29"
7	Domenico Pozzovivo (ITA)	Colnago–CSF Inox	+ 33"
8	Vincenzo Nibali (ITA)	Liquigas–Doimo	+ 42"
9	Manuele Mori (ITA)	Lampre–Farnese Vini	+ 1' 04"
10	Francesco Gavazzi (ITA)	Lampre–Farnese Vini	+ 1' 07"

== Classification leadership ==
Stage	Winner	General Classification	Points Classification	Mountains Classification	Young Riders Classification	Team Classification
1	Linus Gerdemann	Linus Gerdemann	Linus Gerdemann	Dmytro Grabovskyy	José Joaquín Rojas	Colnago–CSF Inox
2	Tom Boonen	Linus Gerdemann	Linus Gerdemann	Dmytro Grabovskyy	José Joaquín Rojas	Colnago–CSF Inox
3	Daniele Bennati	Daniele Bennati	Daniele Bennati	Diego Caccia	José Joaquín Rojas	Astana
4	Michele Scarponi	Michele Scarponi	Daniele Bennati	Diego Caccia	Rigoberto Urán	Androni Giocattoli
5	Enrico Gasparotto	Michele Scarponi	Daniele Bennati	Dmytro Grabovskyy	Robert Gesink	Astana
6	Mikhail Ignatiev	Michele Scarponi	Stefano Garzelli	Dmytro Grabovskyy	Robert Gesink	Lampre–Farnese Vini
7	Edvald Boasson Hagen	Stefano Garzelli	Stefano Garzelli	Dmytro Grabovskyy	Robert Gesink	Lampre–Farnese Vini
Final		Stefano Garzelli	Stefano Garzelli	Dmytro Grabovskyy	Robert Gesink	Lampre–Farnese Vini
