= 1997 Tour de Romandie =

Race details
- Dates: 6–11 May 1997
- Stages: 6 + Prologue
- Distance: 760.1 km (472.3 mi)
- Winning time: 20h 22' 46"

Results
	Winner	Pavel Tonkov (RUS)	(Mapei–GB)
	Second	Chris Boardman (GBR)	(GAN)
	Third	Beat Zberg (SUI)	(Mercatone Uno)

The 1997 Tour de Romandie was the 51st edition of the Tour de Romandie cycle race and was held from 6 May to 11 May 1997. The race started in Kriegstetten and finished in Geneva. The race was won by Pavel Tonkov of the Mapei team.

== General classification ==
Final general classification
Rank	Rider	Team	Time
1	Pavel Tonkov (RUS)	Mapei–GB	20h 22' 46"
2	Chris Boardman (GBR)	GAN	+ 45"
3	Beat Zberg (SUI)	Mercatone Uno	+ 1' 04"
4	Andrey Teteryuk (KAZ)	Lotto–Mobistar–Isoglass	+ 1' 27"
5	Giuseppe Guerini (ITA)	Team Polti	+ 1' 42"
6	Peter Meinert Nielsen (DEN)	U.S. Postal Service	+ 1' 54"
7	Davide Rebellin (ITA)	Française des Jeux	+ 2' 08"
8	Gilberto Simoni (ITA)	MG Maglificio–Technogym	+ 2' 16"
9	Viatcheslav Ekimov (RUS)	U.S. Postal Service	+ 2' 21"
10	Alexandr Shefer (KAZ)	Asics–CGA	+ 2' 23"
