= 1998 Grand Prix de Suisse =

1998 UCI Road World Cup

Race details
- Dates: 22 August 1998
- Stages: 1
- Distance: 243 km (151.0 mi)
- Winning time: 6h 09' 24"

Results
| | Winner | Michele Bartoli (ITA) | (Asics–CGA) |
| | Second | Frank Vandenbroucke (BEL) | (Mapei–Bricobi) |
| | Third | Salvatore Commesso (ITA) | (Saeco–Cannondale) |

The 1998 Grand Prix de Suisse was the 83rd edition of the Züri-Metzgete road cycling one day race. It was held on 23 August 1998 as part of the 1998 UCI Road World Cup. The race took place between the cities of Basel and Zürich was won by Michele Bartoli of Italy.

== Result ==
| Rank | Rider | Team | Time |
|---|---|---|---|
| 1 | Michele Bartoli (ITA) | Asics–CGA | 6h 09' 24" |
| 2 | Frank Vandenbroucke (BEL) | Mapei–Bricobi | s.t. |
| 3 | Salvatore Commesso (ITA) | Saeco–Cannondale | s.t. |
| 4 | Andrea Tafi (ITA) | Mapei–Bricobi | s.t. |
| 5 | Bobby Julich (USA) | Cofidis | s.t. |
| 6 | Massimiliano Gentili (ITA) | Cantina Tollo–Alexia Alluminio | s.t. |
| 7 | Davide Rebellin (ITA) | Team Polti | s.t. |
| 8 | Paolo Bettini (ITA) | Asics–CGA | s.t. |
| 9 | Dario Frigo (ITA) | Saeco–Cannondale | + 12" |
| 10 | Fabio Baldato (ITA) | Riso Scotti–MG Maglificio | + 23" |
