= 1998 Tour de Suisse =

Race details
- Dates: 16–25 June 1998
- Stages: 10
- Distance: 1,504 km (934.5 mi)
- Winning time: 37h 06' 26"

Results
	Winner	Stefano Garzelli (ITA)	(Mercatone Uno–Bianchi)
	Second	Beat Zberg (SUI)	(Rabobank)
	Third	Wladimir Belli (ITA)	(Festina–Lotus)

The 1998 Tour de Suisse was the 62nd edition of the Tour de Suisse cycle race and was held from 16 June to 25 June 1998. The race started in Biel and finished in Zürich. The race was won by Stefano Garzelli of the Mercatone Uno team.

== Teams ==
Seventeen teams of up to nine riders started the race:

- Casino–Ag2r
- Team Telekom
- ONCE
- Cofidis
- Française des Jeux
- Festina–Lotus
- Amore & Vita–ForzArcore
- Asics–CGA
- Ballan
- Mapei–Bricobi
- Mercatone Uno–Bianchi
- Team Polti
- Ros Mary–Amica Chips
- Saeco–Cannondale
- Scrigno–Gaerne
- Rabobank
- Ericsson–Villiger

== Route ==
Stage characteristics and winners
Stage	Date	Course	Distance	Type	Winner
1	16 June	Biel	5.6 km (3.5 mi)	Individual time trial	Laurent Jalabert (FRA)
2	17 June	Biel to Villars-sur-Ollon	178 km (110.6 mi)		Davide Rebellin (ITA)
3	18 June	Aigle to Ulrichen/Obergoms	159 km (98.8 mi)		Markus Zberg (SUI)
4	19 June	Oberwald/Obergoms to Varese	208 km (129.2 mi)		Laurent Jalabert (FRA)
5	20 June	Varese to Lenzerheide	230 km (142.9 mi)		Stefano Garzelli (ITA)
6	21 June	Lenzerheide to Lenzerheide	156.1 km (97.0 mi)		Stefano Garzelli (ITA)
7	22 June	Haag to Morschach/Brunnen	164 km (101.9 mi)		Vladimir Duma (UKR)
8	23 June	Brunnen to Huttwil	180 km (111.8 mi)		Niki Aebersold (SUI)
9	24 June	Ittigen	30 km (18.6 mi)	Individual time trial	Laurent Jalabert (FRA)
10	25 June	Bern to Bern	180 km (111.8 mi)		Niki Aebersold (SUI)

== General classification ==
Final general classification

Rank	Rider	Team	Time
1	Stefano Garzelli (ITA)	Mercatone Uno–Bianchi	37h 06' 26"
2	Beat Zberg (SUI)	Rabobank	+ 53"
3	Wladimir Belli (ITA)	Festina–Lotus	+ 1' 51"
4	Leonardo Piepoli (ITA)	Saeco–Cannondale	+ 2' 24"
5	Francesco Casagrande (ITA)	Cofidis	+ 2' 41"
6	Roland Meier (SUI)	Cofidis	+ 3' 25"
7	Alexandr Shefer (KAZ)	Asics–CGA	+ 3' 35"
8	Davide Rebellin (ITA)	Team Polti	+ 3' 43"
9	Peter Luttenberger (AUT)	Rabobank	+ 4' 04"
10	Jan Ullrich (GER)	Team Telekom	+ 4' 57"
