= 2000 Giro d'Italia =

Race details
- Dates: May 13—June 4, 2000
- Stages: 21 + prologue
- Distance: 3,676 km (2,284 mi)
- Winning time: 89h 30' 14"

Results
Jersey awarded to the overall winner	Winner	Stefano Garzelli (ITA)	(Mercatone Uno–Albacom)
	Second	Francesco Casagrande (ITA)	(Vini Caldirola–Sidermec)
	Third	Gilberto Simoni (ITA)	(Lampre–Daikin)
Jersey awarded to the points classification winner	Points	Dimitri Konyshev (RUS)	(Fassa Bortolo)
Jersey awarded to the mountains classification winner	Mountains	Francesco Casagrande (ITA)	(Vini Caldirola–Sidermec)
	Combativity	Dimitri Konyshev (RUS)	(Fassa Bortolo)
Jersey awarded to the intergiro classification winner	Intergiro	Fabrizio Guidi (ITA)	(Française des Jeux)
	Team	Mapei–Quick-Step	
	Team points	Fassa Bortolo	

The 2000 Giro d'Italia was the 83rd edition of the Giro. It began with a 4.6 km (3 mi) prologue that navigated through the Italian capital Rome. The race came to a close on June 4 with a mass-start stage that ended in the Italian city of Milan. Twenty teams entered the race that was won by the Italian Stefano Garzelli of the Mercatone Uno–Albacom team. Second and third were the Italian riders Francesco Casagrande and Gilberto Simoni.

In the race's other classifications, Vini Caldirola–Sidermec rider Francesco Casagrande won the mountains classification, Dimitri Konyshev of the Fassa Bortolo team won the points classification, and Française des Jeux rider Fabrizio Guidi won the intergiro classification. Mapei–Quick-Step finished as the winners of the Trofeo Fast Team classification, ranking each of the twenty teams contesting the race by lowest cumulative time. The other team classification, the Trofeo Super Team classification, where the teams' riders are awarded points for placing within the top twenty in each stage and the points are then totaled for each team was won by Fassa Bortolo.

== Teams ==
The race organizers RCS Sport invited twenty teams to participate in the race. Each team sent a squad of nine riders, so the Giro began with a peloton of 180 cyclists. Out of the 180 riders that started this edition of the Giro d'Italia, a total of 127 riders made it to the finish in Milan.

The teams that took part in the race were:

- Amica Chips–Tacconi Sport
- Banesto
- Cantina Tollo
- Ceramica Panaria–Gaerne
- Farm Frites
- Fassa Bortolo
- Kelme–Costa Blanca
- Française des Jeux
- Lampre–Daikin
- Linda McCartney Racing Team
- Liquigas–Pata
- Mapei–Quick-Step
- Mercatone Uno–Albacom
- Mobilvetta Design–Rossin
- Team Polti
- Aguardiente Néctar–Selle Italia
- Rabobank
- Saeco–Valli & Valli
- Vini Caldirola–Sidermec
- Vitalicio Seguros

== Pre-race favorites ==
Marco Pantani (Mercatone Uno–Albacom) – who was expelled the previous year for having high levels of hematocrit – announced his intentions to race the Giro a few weeks prior to the race despite only racing a few times during the year. Francesco Casagrande (Vini Caldirola–Sidermec) was seen as a favorite because of his victory at the 1999 Tour de Suisse; however, a doping suspension, marred the rest of his season. Paolo Savoldelli was found to be in good form following an overall victory at the Tour de Romandie.

Tim Maloney of CyclingNews stated that Team Polti's Ivan Gotti, who had won the previous year's race following Pantani's disqualification, desired to prove he is a legitimate contender. He added that the young rider Danilo Di Luca will be competing in his second Giro and he will aim for a stage victory.

Sprinter Mario Cipollini, a favorite to win the stages if they come to a bunch sprint, started the race after battling asthma in the preceding weeks. Ivan Quaranta (Mobilvetta Design–Rossin) was another rider that was seen as a contender for the sprint stages, along with reigning Italian road race champion Salvatore Commesso (Saeco–Valli & Valli).

== Route and stages ==
The race route was revealed by the organizers in Milan at the Teatro Lirico. This running of the Giro contained three individual time trial events, one of which was the prologue the race began with. There were a total of ten stages that contained categorized climbs; five of which contained climbs of higher categories, while the other five stages held only categorized climbs of lesser degree. The remaining nine stages were primarily flat stages.

Of the mountain stages, three ended with summit finishes: stage 5 to Peschici, stage 9 to Abetone, and stage 18 to Prato Nevoso. One other stage had a summit arrival, the demanding stage 20 climbing time trial up the Sestriere.

The race began in Rome to celebrate the Great Jubilee, with the opening prologue passing historic sites such as the Colosseum and Imperial Forum. The race then headed down the coast to Scalea through the first week, before turning east to Matera, then heading north through Apulia, travelling along a length of the Adriatic coast.

CyclingNews writer Tim Maloney felt that the first difficult stage to be raced would be the eighth stage, which featured three major categorized climbs across 255 km (158 mi) of racing.

List of stages
Stage	Date	Course	Distance	Type	Winner
P	13 May	Rome	4.6 km (3 mi)	Individual time trial	Jan Hruška (CZE)
1	14 May	Rome to Terracina	125 km (78 mi)	Flat stage	Ivan Quaranta (ITA)
2	15 May	Terracina to Maddaloni	225 km (140 mi)	Medium mountain stage	Cristian Moreni (ITA)
3	16 May	Paestum to Scalea	177 km (110 mi)	Flat stage	Ján Svorada (CZE)
4	17 May	Scalea to Matera	233 km (145 mi)	Flat stage	Mario Cipollini (ITA)
5	18 May	Matera to Peschici	232 km (144 mi)	Medium mountain stage	Danilo Di Luca (ITA)
6	19 May	Peschici to Vasto	160 km (99 mi)	Flat stage	Dimitri Konyshev (RUS)
7	20 May	Vasto to Teramo	182 km (113 mi)	Flat stage	David McKenzie (AUS)
8	21 May	Corinaldo to Prato	265 km (165 mi)	Medium mountain stage	Axel Merckx (BEL)
9	22 May	Prato to Abetone	138 km (86 mi)	Mountain stage	(Italy) Francesco Casagrande
10	23 May	San Marcello Pistoiese to Padua	253 km (157 mi)	Flat stage	Ivan Quaranta (ITA)
11	24 May	Lignano Sabbiadoro to Bibione	45 km (28 mi)	Individual time trial	Víctor Hugo Peña (COL)
	25 May	Rest day			
12	26 May	Bibione to Feltre	184 km (114 mi)	Medium mountain stage	Enrico Cassani (ITA)
13	27 May	Feltre to Sëlva	186 km (116 mi)	Mountain stage	José Luis Rubiera (ESP)
14	28 May	Sëlva to Bormio	203 km (126 mi)	Mountain stage	Gilberto Simoni (ITA)
15	29 May	Bormio to Brescia	180 km (112 mi)	Flat stage	Biagio Conte (ITA)
16	30 May	Brescia to Meda	102 km (63 mi)	Flat stage	Fabrizio Guidi (ITA)
17	31 May	Meda to Genoa	236 km (147 mi)	Medium mountain stage	Álvaro González de Galdeano (ESP)
18	1 June	Genoa to Prato Nevoso	173 km (107 mi)	Mountain stage	Stefano Garzelli (ITA)
19	2 June	Saluzzo to Briançon (France)	176 km (109 mi)	Mountain stage	Paolo Lanfranchi (ITA)
20	3 June	Briançon (France) to Sestriere	32 km (20 mi)	Individual time trial	Jan Hruška (CZE)
21	4 June	Turin to Milan	189 km (117 mi)	Flat stage	Mariano Piccoli (ITA)
	Total		3,676 km (2,284 mi)		

== Classification Leadership ==
In the 2000 Giro d'Italia, five different jerseys were awarded. For the general classification, calculated by adding each cyclist's finishing times on each stage, and allowing time bonuses for the first three finishers on mass-start stages, the leader received a pink jersey. This classification is considered the most important of the Giro d'Italia, and the winner is considered the winner of the Giro.

Additionally, there was a points classification, which awarded a mauve jersey. In the points classification, cyclists got points for finishing in the top 15 in a stage. The stage win awarded 25 points, second place awarded 20 points, third 16, fourth 14, fifth 12, sixth 10, and one point fewer per place down the line, to a single point for 15th. In addition, points could be won in intermediate sprints.

There was also a mountains classification, which awarded a green jersey. In the mountains classifications, points were won by reaching the top of a mountain before other cyclists. Each climb was categorized as either first, second, or third category, with more points available for the higher-categorized climbs. The highest point in the Giro (called the Cima Coppi), which in 2000 was Colle dell'Agnello, afforded more points than the other first-category climbs.

The fourth jersey represented the intergiro classification, marked by a blue jersey. The calculation for the intergiro is similar to that of the general classification, in each stage there is a midway point that the riders pass through a point and where their time is stopped. As the race goes on, their times compiled and the person with the lowest time is the leader of the intergiro classification and wears the blue jersey.

There were also two classifications for teams. The first was the Trofeo Fast Team. In this classification, the times of the best three cyclists per team on each stage were added; the leading team was the team with the lowest total time. The Trofeo Super Team was a team points classification, with the top 20 placed riders on each stage earning points (20 for first place, 19 for second place and so on, down to a single point for 20th) for their team.

The rows in the following table correspond to the jerseys awarded after that stage was run.

Classification leadership by stage
Stage	Winner	General classification	Points classification	Mountains classification	Intergiro classification	Trofeo Fast Team	Trofeo Super Team
P	Jan Hruška	Jan Hruška	not awarded	not awarded	not awarded	not awarded	not awarded
1	Ivan Quaranta	Mario Cipollini	Ivan Quaranta	Alessandro Petacchi	Mario Cipollini	Française des Jeux	Team Polti
2	Cristian Moreni	Cristian Moreni	Cristian Moreni	Karsten Kroon	Matteo Tosatto	Liquigas-Pata	Team Polti
3	Ján Svorada	Cristian Moreni	Matteo Tosatto	Karsten Kroon	Matteo Tosatto	Liquigas-Pata	Team Polti
4	Mario Cipollini	Cristian Moreni	Mario Cipollini	Karsten Kroon	Matteo Tosatto	Liquigas-Pata	Team Polti
5	Danilo Di Luca	Matteo Tosatto	Matteo Tosatto	Karsten Kroon	Matteo Tosatto	Liquigas-Pata	Fassa Bortolo
6	Dmitri Konyshev	Matteo Tosatto	Matteo Tosatto	Karsten Kroon	Matteo Tosatto	Liquigas-Pata	Fassa Bortolo
7	David McKenzie	Matteo Tosatto	Dmitri Konyshev	Karsten Kroon	Matteo Tosatto	Liquigas-Pata	Fassa Bortolo
8	Axel Merckx	José Enrique Gutiérrez	Dmitri Konyshev	Karsten Kroon	Fabrizio Guidi	Mapei - Quick Step	Team Polti
9	Francesco Casagrande	Francesco Casagrande	Dmitri Konyshev	Karsten Kroon	Fabrizio Guidi	Mapei - Quick Step	Fassa Bortolo
10	Ivan Quaranta	Francesco Casagrande	Dmitri Konyshev	Karsten Kroon	Fabrizio Guidi	Mapei - Quick Step	Fassa Bortolo
11	Víctor Hugo Peña	Francesco Casagrande	Dmitri Konyshev	Karsten Kroon	Fabrizio Guidi	Vini Caldirola–Sidermec	Fassa Bortolo
12	Enrico Cassani	Francesco Casagrande	Dmitri Konyshev	Karsten Kroon	Fabrizio Guidi	Vini Caldirola–Sidermec	Fassa Bortolo
13	José Luis Rubiera	Francesco Casagrande	Dmitri Konyshev	Francesco Casagrande	Fabrizio Guidi	Mapei - Quick Step	Fassa Bortolo
14	Gilberto Simoni	Francesco Casagrande	Dmitri Konyshev	José Jaime González	Fabrizio Guidi	Mapei - Quick Step	Fassa Bortolo
15	Biagio Conte	Francesco Casagrande	Dmitri Konyshev	José Jaime González	Fabrizio Guidi	Mapei - Quick Step	Fassa Bortolo
16	Fabrizio Guidi	Francesco Casagrande	Dmitri Konyshev	José Jaime González	Fabrizio Guidi	Mapei - Quick Step	Fassa Bortolo
17	Álvaro González de Galdeano	Francesco Casagrande	Dmitri Konyshev	José Jaime González	Fabrizio Guidi	Mapei - Quick Step	Fassa Bortolo
18	Stefano Garzelli	Francesco Casagrande	Dmitri Konyshev	Francesco Casagrande	Fabrizio Guidi	Mapei - Quick Step	Fassa Bortolo
19	Paolo Lanfranchi	Francesco Casagrande	Dmitri Konyshev	José Jaime González	Fabrizio Guidi	Mapei - Quick Step	Fassa Bortolo
20	Jan Hruška	Stefano Garzelli	Dmitri Konyshev	Francesco Casagrande	Fabrizio Guidi	Mapei - Quick Step	Fassa Bortolo
21	Mariano Piccoli	Stefano Garzelli	Dmitri Konyshev	Francesco Casagrande	Fabrizio Guidi	Mapei - Quick Step	Fassa Bortolo
Final		Stefano Garzelli	Dmitri Konyshev	Francesco Casagrande	Fabrizio Guidi	Mapei - Quick Step	Fassa Bortolo

== Final standings ==
Legend
Pink jersey	Denotes the winner of the General classification	Green jersey	Denotes the winner of the Mountains classification
Purple jersey	Denotes the winner of the Points classification	Blue jersey	Denotes the winner of the Intergiro classification

=== General classification ===
	Rider	Team	Time
1	Stefano Garzelli (ITA)	Mercatone Uno–Albacom	98h 30' 14"
2	Francesco Casagrande (ITA)	Vini Caldirola–Sidermec	+ 1' 27"
3	Gilberto Simoni (ITA)	Lampre–Daikin	+ 1' 33"
4	Andrea Noè (ITA)	Mapei–Quick-Step	+ 4' 58"
5	Pavel Tonkov (RUS)	Mapei–Quick-Step	+ 5' 28"
6	Hernán Buenahora (COL)	Aguardiente Néctar–Selle Italia	+ 5' 48"
7	Wladimir Belli (ITA)	Fassa Bortolo	+ 7' 38"
8	José Luis Rubiera (ESP)	Kelme–Costa Blanca	+ 8' 08"
9	Serhiy Honchar (UKR)	Liquigas-Pata	+ 8' 14"
10	Leonardo Piepoli (ITA)	Banesto	+ 8' 32"

=== Points classification ===
	Rider	Team	Points
1	Dimitri Konyshev (RUS)	Fassa Bortolo	159
2	Fabrizio Guidi (ITA)	Française des Jeux	119
3	Ján Svorada (CZE)	Lampre–Daikin	116
4	Stefano Garzelli (ITA)	Mercatone Uno–Albacom	114
5	Francesco Casagrande (ITA)	Vini Caldirola–Sidermec	106
6	Gilberto Simoni (ITA)	Lampre–Daikin	106
7	Silvio Martinello (ITA)	Team Polti	86
8	Miguel Ángel Martín Perdiguero (ESP)	Vitalicio Seguros	73
9	Paolo Lanfranchi (ITA)	Mapei–Quick-Step	70
10	Wladimir Belli (ITA)	Fassa Bortolo	67

=== Mountains classification ===
	Rider	Team	Points
1	Francesco Casagrande (ITA)	Vini Caldirola–Sidermec	71
2	Chepe González (COL)	Aguardiente Néctar–Selle Italia	71
3	Stefano Garzelli (ITA)	Mercatone Uno–Albacom	47
4	Gilberto Simoni (ITA)	Lampre–Daikin	42
5	Karsten Kroon (NED)	Rabobank	31
6	Félix Cárdenas (ESP)	Kelme–Costa Blanca	21
7	José Enrique Gutiérrez (ESP)	Kelme–Costa Blanca	21
8	Paolo Lanfranchi (ITA)	Mapei–Quick-Step	16
9	Dario Frigo (ITA)	Fassa Bortolo	15
10	José Javier Gomez Gozalo (ESP)	Kelme–Costa Blanca	13

=== Intergiro classification ===
	Rider	Team	Time
1	Fabrizio Guidi (ITA)	Française des Jeux	62h 50' 05"
2	Dimitri Konyshev (RUS)	Fassa Bortolo	+ 57"
3	Diego Ferrari (ITA)	Amica Chips-Tacconi Sport	+ 1' 38"
4	Jan Hruska (CZE)	Vitalicio Seguros	+ 2' 01"
5	Daniele Contrini (ITA)	Liquigas-Pata	+ 2' 03"
6	Ján Svorada (CZE)	Lampre–Daikin	+ 2' 27"
7	Karsten Kroon (NED)	Rabobank	+ 2' 52"
8	Serhiy Honchar (UKR)	Liquigas-Pata	+ 2' 56"
9	Miguel Ángel Martín Perdiguero (ESP)	Vitalicio Seguros	+ 2' 58"
10	Víctor Hugo Peña (COL)	Vitalicio Seguros	+ 3' 07"

=== Trofeo Fast Team classification ===
	Team	Time
1	Mapei–Quick-Step	295h 29' 39"
2	Vitalicio Seguros	+ 31' 03"
3	Kelme–Costa Blanca	+ 31' 23"
4	Fassa Bortolo	+ 38' 25"
5	Banesto	+ 41' 36"
6	Mercatone Uno–Albacom	+ 1h 16' 02"
7	Aguardiente Néctar–Selle Italia	+ 1h 40' 11"
8	Lampre–Daikin	+ 1h 40' 13"
9	Liquigas-Pata	+ 1h 45' 10"
10	Team Polti	+ 1h 49' 55"

=== Trofeo Super Team classification ===
	Team	Points
1	Fassa Bortolo	456
2	Mapei–Quick-Step	375
3	Lampre–Daikin	336
4	Team Polti	312
5	Vitalicio Seguros	309
6	Cantina Tollo	250
7	Kelme–Costa Blanca	250
8	Liquigas-Pata	248
9	Mercatone Uno–Albacom	220
10	Saeco–Valli & Valli	220

=== Minor classifications ===
Other less well-known classifications, whose leaders did not receive a special jersey, were awarded during the Giro. Other awards included the most combative trophy classification, which was a compilation of points gained for position on crossing intermediate sprints, mountain passes and stage finishes. Russian Dmitri Konyshev won the most combative classification. The Top Runner Trophy Liquigas classification was won by Francesco Casagrande.
