= 2001 Giro del Trentino =

Race details
- Dates: 30 April–4 May 2001
- Stages: 4
- Distance: 685 km (425.6 mi)
- Winning time: 17h 17' 58"

Results
| | Winner | Francesco Casagrande (ITA) |
| | Second | Leonardo Piepoli (ITA) |
| | Third | Raimondas Rumšas (LTU) |

The 2001 Giro del Trentino was the 25th edition of the Tour of the Alps cycle race and was held on 30 April to 4 May 2001. The race started in Tione and finished in Arco. The race was won by Francesco Casagrande.

== General classification ==
Final general classification

| Rank | Rider | Time |
|---|---|---|
| 1 | Francesco Casagrande (ITA) | 17h 17' 58" |
| 2 | Leonardo Piepoli (ITA) | + 1' 00" |
| 3 | Raimondas Rumšas (LTU) | + 1' 02" |
| 4 | Gilberto Simoni (ITA) | + 1' 19" |
| 5 | Stefano Garzelli (ITA) | + 1' 41" |
| 6 | Alexandr Shefer (KAZ) | + 1' 59" |
| 7 | Peter Luttenberger (AUT) | + 2' 06" |
| 8 | Serhiy Honchar (UKR) | + 2' 06" |
| 9 | Andrea Noè (ITA) | + 2' 09" |
| 10 | Giuliano Figueras (ITA) | + 2' 09" |
