= Alexandr Shefer =

Kazakhstani cyclist

Personal information
- Born: 28 August 1971 (age 55) Alma-Ata, Kazakh SSR, Soviet Union
- Height: 1.76 m (5 ft 9 in)
- Weight: 68 kg (150 lb)

Cycling career
- Sport: Cycling
- Current team: Retired
- Discipline: Road
- Role: Rider

Professional teams
- 1993–1996: Navigare–Blue Storm
- 1997–1998: Asics–CGA
- 1999: Riso Scotti–Vinavil
- 2000–2002: Alessio
- 2003: Saeco

Managerial team
- 2007–2009: Astana

Alexandr Shefer (Александр Яковлевич Шефер, born 26 or 28 August 1971) is a former Kazakhstani racing cyclist. He was a professional racer from 1993 to 2003. He is the brother of Viktor Shefer, who was also a professional cyclist. Shefer was a coach for Astana from 2007 to 2009, the team of Alexander Vinokourov, alongside team director Belgian Johan Bruyneel.

== Major results ==
1990
1st Overall Regio-Tour
1st Stage 2 Giro delle Regioni
1992
1st Stages 9 & 10b Settimana Ciclistica Lombarda
3rd Overall Giro delle Regioni
1993
10th Overall Tirreno–Adriatico
1994
3rd Giro della Romagna
1996
2nd Giro del Friuli
8th Overall Giro d'Italia
1997
10th Overall Tour de Romandie
1998
7th Overall Tour de Suisse
2001
1st Giro dell'Appennino
2nd Overall Vuelta a Andalucía

1st Stage 2

3rd Overall Vuelta a Aragón
3rd Prueba Villafranca de Ordizia
2002
1st Stage 2 Vuelta a Andalucía
1st Giro di Toscana
2003
3rd La Flèche Wallonne
