= Gilberto Simoni =

Italian cyclist (born 1971)

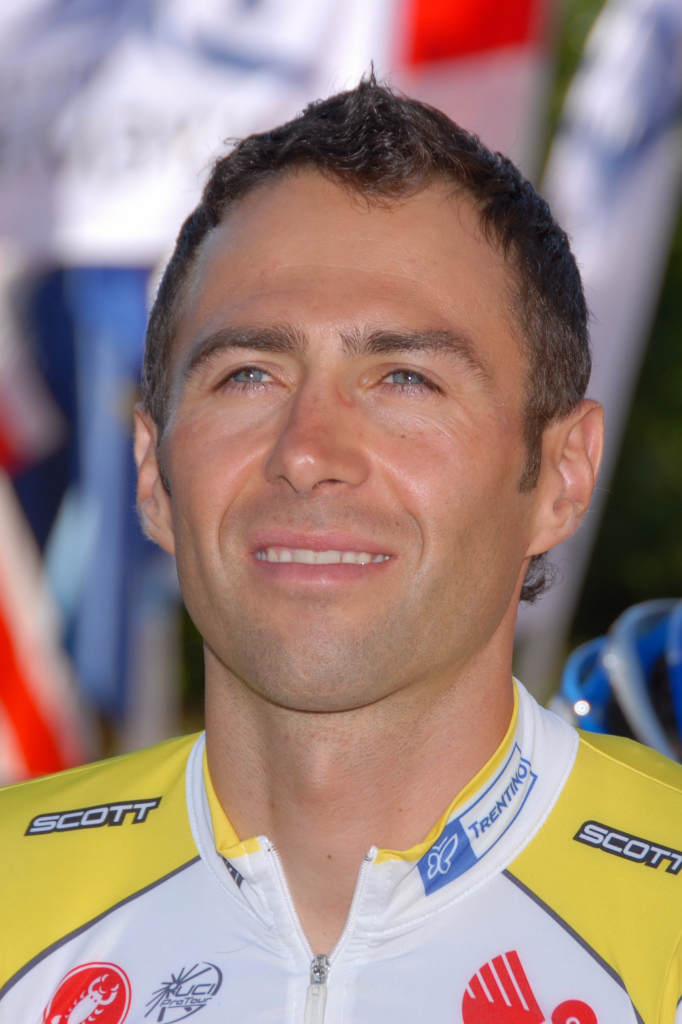
- Simoni in 2007

Personal information
- Full name: Gilberto Simoni
- Nickname: Gibo
- Born: 25 August 1971 (age 55) Palù di Giovo, Italy
- Height: 1.70 m (5 ft 7 in)
- Weight: 62 kg (137 lb; 9 st 11 lb)

Cycling career
- Sport: Cycling
- Discipline: Road
- Role: Rider
- Rider type: Climbing specialist

Professional teams
- 1994: Jolly Componibili–Cage 1994
- 1995–1996: Aki–Gipiemme
- 1997: MG Maglificio–Technogym
- 1998: Cantina Tollo–Alexia Alluminio
- 1999: Ballan–Alessio
- 2000–2001: Lampre–Daikin
- 2002–2004: Saeco–Longoni Sport
- 2005: Lampre–Caffita
- 2006–2007: Saunier Duval–Prodir
- 2008–2009: Diquigiovanni–Androni
- 2010: Lampre–Farnese Vini

Major wins
- Grand Tours Tour de France 1 individual stage (2003) Giro d'Italia General classification (2001, 2003) Points classification (2003) 8 individual stages (2000–2004, 2007) Vuelta a España 2 individual stages (2000, 2001) Stage races Giro del Trentino (2003) One-day races and Classics Japan Cup (2001) Giro dell'Emilia (2000, 2005)

Gilberto Simoni (born 25 August 1971) is an Italian former professional road bicycle racer, most recently for Lampre–Farnese Vini. Simoni won the Giro d'Italia cycling race twice: once in 2001 and again in 2003. In 2002 he tested positive for cocaine and was withdrawn from the race by his Saeco team; he was later cleared of any doping violation by the Italian Cycling Federation. Aside from his withdrawal in 2002, he finished on the podium in every other Giro between 1999 and 2006.

Simoni is a native of Palu di Giovo, and was considered a climbing specialist. His final race as a professional road cyclist was the 2010 Giro d'Italia, which he finished in 69th place overall, 2:40:14 behind other two-time winner, Ivan Basso.

== Career ==
=== Early career ===
Simoni was born in Palù di Giovo, in Trentino, and began competing as an amateur with the goal of someday winning the Giro d'Italia. Simoni confirmed his potential in 1993, when he won both the amateur version of the Giro d'Italia (known as the Baby Giro) and the Italian Road Cycling Championship. Prior to his retirement in 2010, Simoni would reveal to the Italian newspaper La Gazzetta dello Sport that the Giro was the one race that attracted him to cycling and which motivated him as a professional. "It was the Giro that brought me to cycling when I was a child", he said. "It triggered my dreams."

Simoni turned professional in 1994 with the Jolly Componibili–Cage 1994 team, but suffered through an inauspicious rookie season, having to cope with the deaths of both his father and older brother. It was only three years later in 1997 that Simoni won his first professional race, a stage of the Giro del Trentino, while riding for the MG Maglificio–Technogym team of sports director Giancarlo Ferretti.

1998 was another disappointing season for Simoni, and his results sheet was barren after a year spent with the Cantina Tollo–Alexia Alluminio team. He briefly quit cycling and worked as a bicycle mechanic for 1984 Giro d'Italia winner Francesco Moser. However, a resurgent Simoni joined the Ballan–Alessio team in 1999 and finished a surprising third on the general classification of that year's Giro d'Italia. In a race that saw another mercurial Italian climber thrown off the Giro for doping (Marco Pantani), Simoni was criticized in some sectors of the press for claiming a podium finish without having earned the placing. But he proved his critics wrong by winning a stage in the Tour de Suisse and again finishing on the final podium.

=== First Giro d'Italia victory, 2001 ===
The 2000 season started well for Simoni: he'd transferred to the top-ranked Lampre–Daikin team of two-time Giro d'Italia winner Giuseppe Saronni and went on to again finish on the podium of the Giro d'Italia. Simoni cemented his reputation as a climbing specialist by winning the dramatic Alto de El Angliru stage of that year's Vuelta a España.

Simoni started the 2001 Giro d'Italia as Lampre's undisputed leader and hope for the general classification, which he won with a comfortable margin.

=== Second Giro d'Italia victory, 2003 ===
Following his Giro victory Simoni moved to the Saeco–Longoni Sport team with the goal of repeating his Giro success of the previous year. However, traces of cocaine were found in his blood and he was disqualified despite his protestations of innocence. It was later determined that the cocaine in his blood came from candies that his aunt had bought for him from Peru.

In 2003, the Saeco team came to the Giro d'Italia with the sole purpose of supporting Simoni. After competing with a resurgent Stefano Garzelli, Yaroslav Popovych and Marco Pantani in the high mountains in a hailstorm, Simoni achieved his second Giro d'Italia victory. His pursuit was documented in the film The Quest.

Following his successful performance in the Giro, he set his aims on the Tour de France and in several interviews challenged the incumbent Lance Armstrong to a battle in the mountains. His performance was lacking, although he was able to gain a stage win.

=== Later career ===
Simoni failed to defend his title in the 2004 Giro d'Italia with the emergence of his teammate Damiano Cunego. After some public dispute, Simoni reconciled with Cunego and agreed to continue on the same team, which became Lampre–Caffita. In the 2005 Giro d'Italia the team took advantage of the publicity and played up the rivalry between Simoni and Cunego, boasting their strength for the Giro. The early part of the Giro saw Cunego lose significant time in the early mountain stages – he was later diagnosed with Epstein-Barr viral infection – firmly establishing Simoni as the team leader for the Giro. However, Simoni failed to dislodge Paolo Savoldelli in the last mountain stage, even with an epic performance which saw him and Danilo Di Luca work together to gain time on Savoldelli. Suffering from cramps, he also failed to win that stage.

Simoni was slated to join Giancarlo Ferretti's Sony-Ericsson team, which was supposed to be the continuation of the Fassa Bortolo team. However, it later turned out that Ferretti had fallen victim to a fraud, and the team did not in fact exist. After a strong performance in which he finished second in the Giro di Lombardia (which was won by Cunego in the previous edition), Simoni signed a contract to join Saunier Duval–Prodir.

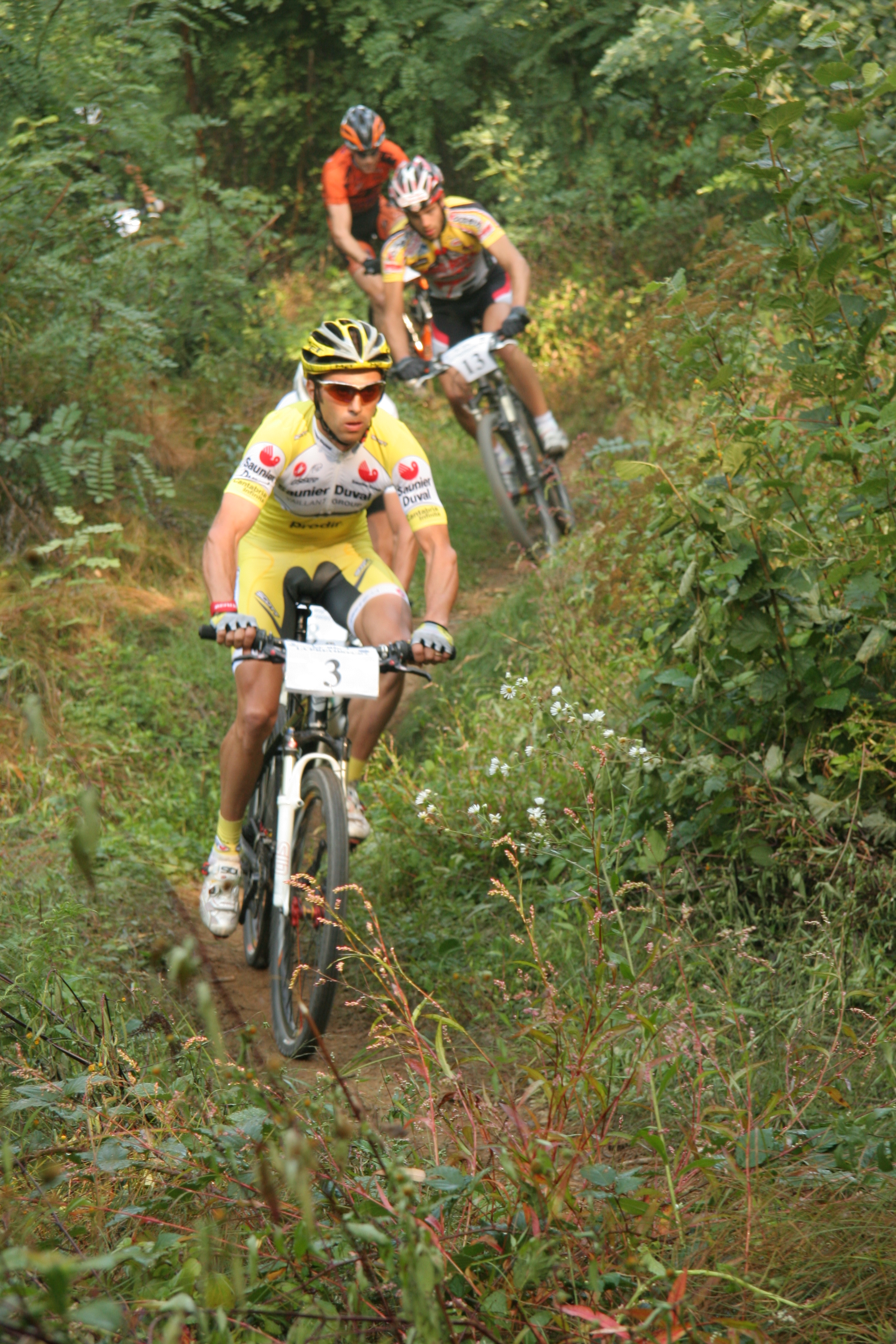
Gilberto Simoni during "La Prevostura 2007" Granfondo competition

On the urging of his frame sponsor, Scott USA, Simoni began competing in mountain bike marathon events during the 2006 off-season for road bicycle racing. He quickly garnered impressive results by winning the Italian National Championship for Mountain Bike Marathon.

Simoni was embroiled in public row with fellow Italian Ivan Basso of Team CSC. Simoni alleged that Basso offered him a stage win in the 2006 Giro d'Italia into Aprica five kilometers from the finish after the two cyclists had broken away from the main field. Basso has denied any such offer, and went on to win the stage by 77 seconds. Simoni retracted his accusations several days later.

In dramatic fashion, with Leonardo Piepoli's support he won the epic stage 17 to Monte Zoncolan in the 2007 Giro d'Italia.

After a lengthy search for a team for 2010, that included negotiations with his previous team Androni Giocattoli as well as with Astana and Rock Racing–Murcia, Simoni re-joined his former Lampre squadra, rechristened as Lampre–Farnese Vini. The 2010 Giro d'Italia was the final race of his career. He finished 69th overall, 2:40:14 behind two-time winner and compatriot Ivan Basso. Simoni was characteristically frank about his last bid for glory, which poignantly saw him beaten in the sprint for the Cima Coppi KOM prize by the Swiss Johann Tschopp, at the summit of the Passo di Gavia in the penultimate Giro stage. Mobbed at the finish line by Italian media looking for one final quote from a rider who rarely hesitated to speak his mind, Simoni mused:

"Perhaps if I'd played more of a bluffing game, I might have had something left for the finish but never mind. That's bike racing. I'm just glad the Giro is over. I've had enough now."

The Trentinese explained that his curtain call did not go as planned, though he still claimed to have enjoyed closing-out his storied career by finishing a three-week Grand Tour, one of the most challenging events for an endurance road cyclist:

"I've known it was time to retire for awhile [sic] It's been on my mind for the last two years. I knew this Giro was my last race. I've been a professional for 17 years, and it really is time to quit. I honestly thought I'd go better than I did in this Giro. I knew I couldn't win it like in 2003 or 2007 (Monte Zoncolan stage), but I didn't expect to suffer so much and for so long during the three weeks. It's been a strange goodbye. I've ridden the Giro almost as an outsider, without the pressure to win and do well. It's hurt but I've been able to enjoy it. Before the finish today, the whole thing flashed before my eyes."

== Retirement ==
Cycling columnist Samuel Abt of the International Herald Tribune described Simoni as "an inspiration to all retirees who wonder what they will do now with so much time on their hands." He pointed out that "instead of taking up golf or lurking at home and watching television", the first thing Simoni did "after saying goodbye to the workplace [was] rejoin it."

But after finally calling it quits on a professional career that included nearly 600 classified results in UCI-sanctioned events, Simoni was vague concerning his plans for his life after cycling, though he hinted at not being in a rush or under any economic or psychological pressure to immediately engage in a new venture. Prior to the 2010 Giro's final stage, Simoni declared his intention to slow down the pace of decision-making in his life: "I don't want to think about my future just yet," he said. "I won't need to rush things anymore. I won't need to race against time. I can take my time and enjoy the rest of my life."

== Career achievements ==
=== Major results ===
1989
1st Giro della Lunigiana
1991
1st Giro della Regione Friuli Venezia Giulia
1st Trofeo Alcide Degasperi
3rd Gran Premio Palio del Recioto
1992
2nd Piccolo Giro di Lombardia
1993
1st Overall Girobio
1st Giro della Regione Friuli Venezia Giulia
1994
10th Subida a Urkiola
1995
4th Subida a Urkiola
1997
7th Overall Giro del Trentino

1st Stage 1

8th Overall Tour de Romandie
1998
6th Giro di Lombardia
1999
2nd Overall Giro del Trentino
3rd Overall Giro d'Italia
3rd Overall Tour de Suisse

1st Stage 4

6th Giro di Toscana
6th Coppa Placci
2000
1st Giro dell'Emilia
1st Stage 16 Vuelta a España
2nd Road race, National Road Championships
2nd Polynormande
3rd Overall Giro d'Italia

1st Stage 14

6th Overall Tour de Suisse
7th Overall Giro del Trentino
9th Gran Premio Industria e Commercio di Prato
2001
1st Overall Giro d'Italia

1st Stage 20

1st Japan Cup
1st Stage 20 Vuelta a España
2nd Overall Tour de Suisse
4th Overall Giro del Trentino
5th Overall Tour de Romandie

1st Stage 4

9th EnBW Grand Prix (with Oscar Camenzind)
2002
1st Stage 11 Giro d'Italia
3rd Overall Giro del Trentino
3rd Giro del Friuli
3rd Gran Premio de Llodio
10th Overall Vuelta a España
10th Overall Vuelta a Burgos
10th Trofeo Melinda
2003
1st Overall Giro d'Italia

1st Points classification
1st Azzurri d'Italia classification
1st Stages 12, 14 & 19

1st Overall Giro del Trentino

1st Stage 2

1st Giro dell'Appennino
1st Stage 14 Tour de France
2nd Overall Vuelta a Aragón
2004
1st Giro del Veneto
2nd Giro del Lazio
3rd Overall Giro d'Italia

1st Stage 3

3rd Overall Giro del Trentino
5th Giro dell'Appennino
7th Klasika Primavera
2005
1st Giro dell'Emilia
1st Giro dell'Appennino
1st Memorial Marco Pantani
1st Stage 5 Paris–Nice
2nd Overall Giro d'Italia
2nd Giro di Lombardia
2006
1st National MTB Marathon Championships
3rd Overall Giro d'Italia
8th Overall Giro del Trentino
2007
4th Overall Giro d'Italia

1st Stage 17

6th Trofeo Melinda
2008
10th Overall Giro d'Italia
2009
1st Stage 3 Vuelta Mexico Telmex
6th Overall Giro del Trentino
10th Overall Vuelta a Andalucía

=== Grand Tour general classification results timeline ===
Grand Tour	1995	1996	1997	1998	1999	2000	2001	2002	2003	2004	2005	2006	2007	2008	2009	2010
Giro d'Italia	DNF	DNF	DNF	58	3	3	1	DNF	1	3	2	3	4	10	24	69
Tour de France	DNF	—	116	—	—	—	—	—	84	17	—	60	—	—	—	—
/ Vuelta a España	—	—	—	19	—	29	36	10	—	—	50	—	—	—	—	—

Legend
DSQ	Disqualified
DNF	Did not finish

== See also ==
- List of doping cases in cycling
