= 2000 La Flèche Wallonne =

Race details
- Dates: 12 April 2000
- Stages: 1
- Distance: 198 km (123.0 mi)
- Winning time: 4h 53' 08"

Results
	Winner	Francesco Casagrande (ITA)	(Vini Caldirola–Sidermec)
	Second	Rik Verbrugghe (BEL)	(Lotto–Adecco)
	Third	Laurent Jalabert (FRA)	(ONCE–Deutsche Bank)

The 2000 La Flèche Wallonne was the 64th edition of La Flèche Wallonne cycle race and was held on 12 April 2000. The race started in Charleroi and finished in Huy. The race was won by Francesco Casagrande of the Vini Caldirola team.

== General classification ==
Final general classification

Rank	Rider	Team	Time
1	Francesco Casagrande (ITA)	Vini Caldirola–Sidermec	4h 53' 08"
2	Rik Verbrugghe (BEL)	Lotto–Adecco	+ 6"
3	Laurent Jalabert (FRA)	ONCE–Deutsche Bank	+ 8"
4	Davide Rebellin (ITA)	Liquigas–Pata	+ 8"
5	Mario Aerts (BEL)	Lotto–Adecco	+ 8"
6	Peter Farazijn (BEL)	Cofidis	+ 8"
7	David Etxebarria (ESP)	ONCE–Deutsche Bank	+ 8"
8	Dario Frigo (ITA)	Fassa Bortolo	+ 8"
9	Mauro Gianetti (SUI)	Vini Caldirola–Sidermec	+ 8"
10	Axel Merckx (BEL)	Mapei–Quick-Step	+ 14"
