= 2001 Tour de Suisse =

Race details
- Dates: 19–28 June 2001
- Stages: 10
- Distance: 1,412 km (877.4 mi)
- Winning time: ~~35h 00' 06"~~

Results
	Winner	~~Lance Armstrong~~	(~~U.S. Postal Service~~)
	Second	Gilberto Simoni (ITA)	(Lampre–Daikin)
	Third	Wladimir Belli (ITA)	(Fassa Bortolo)

The 2001 Tour de Suisse was the 65th edition of the Tour de Suisse cycle race and was held from 19 June to 28 June 2001. The race started in Rust and finished in Lausanne. The race has no overall winner. Although Lance Armstrong originally won the event, he was stripped of the title due to violating anti-doping regulations. In 2012, the United States Anti-Doping Agency disqualified him from his results after 1 August 1998. The verdict was confirmed by the Union Cycliste Internationale.

== Teams ==
Seventeen teams of eight riders started the race:

- Lampre–Daikin
- Rabobank
- Fassa Bortolo
- Mapei–Quick-Step
- Domo–Farm Frites–Latexco
- Cofidis
- Team Telekom
- Liquigas–Pata
- U.S. Postal Service
- Tacconi Sport–Vini Caldirola
- Saeco
- CSC–Tiscali
- Team Coast–Buffalo
- Française des Jeux
- Gerolsteiner
- Phonak
- Post Swiss Team

== Route ==
Stage characteristics and winners
Stage	Date	Course	Distance	Type	Winner
1	19 June	Rust (Germany)	7.9 km (4.9 mi)	Individual time trial	~~Lance Armstrong (USA)~~
2	20 June	Rust (Germany) to Basel	178.8 km (111.1 mi)		Erik Zabel (GER)
3	21 June	Reinach to Baar	162.7 km (101.1 mi)		Gianluca Bortolami (ITA)
4	22 June	Baar to Wildhaus	144 km (89.5 mi)		Alexander Vinokourov (KAZ)
5	23 June	Widnau/Heerbrugg to Col du Gotthard	220.6 km (137.1 mi)		Dimitri Konyshev (RUS)
6	24 June	Mendrisio to Mendrisio	174.5 km (108.4 mi)		Sergei Ivanov (RUS)
7	25 June	Locarno to Naters	156.6 km (97.3 mi)		Stefano Garzelli (ITA)
8	26 June	Sion to Crans-Montana	25.1 km (15.6 mi)	Individual time trial	~~Lance Armstrong (USA)~~
9	27 June	Sion to Lausanne	166.8 km (103.6 mi)		Erik Zabel (GER)
10	28 June	Lausanne to Lausanne	175.9 km (109.3 mi)		Oscar Camenzind (SUI)

== General classification ==
Final general classification

Rank	Rider	Team	Time
~~1~~	~~Lance Armstrong (USA)~~	~~U.S. Postal Service~~	~~35h 00' 06"~~ (Note: In 2012, Lance Armstrong was disqualified from his position in the race. He was stripped of all results after 1 August 1998, as a consequence of the Lance Armstrong doping case.)
2	Gilberto Simoni (ITA)	Lampre–Daikin	+ 1' 02"
3	Wladimir Belli (ITA)	Fassa Bortolo	+ 1' 34"
4	Beat Zberg (SUI)	Rabobank	+ 2' 47"
5	Alexander Vinokourov (KAZ)	Team Telekom	+ 2' 48"
6	Georg Totschnig (AUT)	Gerolsteiner	+ 2' 58"
7	Juan Manuel Gárate (ESP)	Lampre–Daikin	+ 3' 30"
8	Manuel Beltrán (ESP)	Mapei–Quick-Step	+ 3' 37"
9	Laurent Jalabert (FRA)	CSC–Tiscali	+ 3' 46"
10	Daniel Schnider (SUI)	Française des Jeux	+ 5' 51"
