= 2008 Vuelta a Murcia =

Race details
- Dates: 4–8 March 2008
- Stages: 5
- Distance: 653.8 km (406.3 mi)
- Winning time: 16h 29' 01"

Results
| | Winner | Alejandro Valverde (ESP) |
| | Second | Stefano Garzelli (ITA) |
| | Third | Alberto Contador (ESP) |

The 2008 Vuelta a Murcia was the 24th edition of the Vuelta a Murcia cycle race and was held on 4 March to 8 March 2008. The race started in San Pedro del Pinatar and finished in Murcia. The race was won by Alejandro Valverde.

== General classification ==
Final general classification

| Rank | Rider | Time |
|---|---|---|
| 1 | Alejandro Valverde (ESP) | 16h 29' 01" |
| 2 | Stefano Garzelli (ITA) | + 2" |
| 3 | Alberto Contador (ESP) | + 6" |
| 4 | Antonio Colom (ESP) | + 51" |
| 5 | Branislau Samoilau (BLR) | + 1' 11" |
| 6 | Íñigo Cuesta (ESP) | + 1' 13" |
| 7 | Vasil Kiryienka (BLR) | + 1' 15" |
| 8 | José Luis Rubiera (ESP) | + 1' 19" |
| 9 | Carlos Sastre (ESP) | + 1' 27" |
| 10 | Ezequiel Mosquera (ESP) | + 1' 42" |
