= 1999 Clásica de San Sebastián =

Race details
- Dates: 7 August 1999
- Stages: 1
- Distance: 230 km (142.9 mi)
- Winning time: 5h 15' 29"

Results
	Winner	Francesco Casagrande (ITA)	(Vini Caldirola)
	Second	Rik Verbrugghe (BEL)	(Lotto–Mobistar)
	Third	Giuliano Figueras (ITA)	(Mapei–Quick-Step)

The 1999 Clásica de San Sebastián was the 19th edition of the Clásica de San Sebastián cycle race and was held on 7 August 1999. The race started and finished in San Sebastián. The race was won by Francesco Casagrande of the Vini Caldirola team.

== General classification ==
Final general classification

Rank	Rider	Team	Time
1	Francesco Casagrande (ITA)	Vini Caldirola	5h 15' 29"
2	Rik Verbrugghe (BEL)	Lotto–Mobistar	+ 43"
3	Giuliano Figueras (ITA)	Mapei–Quick-Step	+ 43"
4	Andrei Tchmil (BEL)	Lotto–Mobistar	+ 43"
5	Salvatore Commesso (ITA)	Saeco–Cannondale	+ 43"
6	Francisco Mancebo (ESP)	Banesto	+ 43"
7	Erik Dekker (NED)	Rabobank	+ 43"
8	Max Sciandri (GBR)	Française des Jeux	+ 43"
9	Michael Boogerd (NED)	Rabobank	+ 43"
10	Massimiliano Mori (ITA)	Saeco–Cannondale	+ 43"
