= 1998 HEW Cyclassics =

Race details
- Dates: 16 August 1998
- Stages: 1
- Distance: 253 km (157.2 mi)
- Winning time: 6h 09' 28"

Results
	Winner	Léon van Bon (NED)
	Second	Michele Bartoli (ITA)
	Third	Ludo Dierckxsens (BEL)

The 1998 HEW Cyclassics was the third edition of the HEW Cyclassics cycle race and was held on 16 August 1998. The race started and finished in Hamburg. The race was won by Léon van Bon.

== General classification ==
Final general classification

	Cyclist	Team	Time
1	Léon van Bon (NED)	Rabobank	6h 09' 31"
2	Michele Bartoli (ITA)	Asics–CGA	s.t.
3	Ludo Dierckxsens (BEL)	Lotto–Mobistar	s.t.
4	Salvatore Commesso (ITA)	Saeco–Cannondale	s.t.
5	Nico Mattan (BEL)	Mapei–Bricobi	s.t.
6	Christophe Mengin (FRA)	Française des Jeux	s.t.
7	Michael Rich (GER)	Saeco–Cannondale	s.t.
8	Christian Wegmann (GER)	Die Continentale-Olympia	s.t.
9	Jan Ullrich (GER)	Team Telekom	s.t.
10	Paul Van Hyfte (BEL)	Lotto–Mobistar	s.t.
