= 2002 Giro del Trentino =

Race details
- Dates: 25–28 April 2002
- Stages: 4
- Distance: 695.6 km (432.2 mi)
- Winning time: 18h 03' 06"

Results
	Winner	Francesco Casagrande (ITA)
	Second	Julio Alberto Pérez (MEX)
	Third	Gilberto Simoni (ITA)

The 2002 Giro del Trentino was the 26th edition of the Tour of the Alps cycle race and was held on 25 April to 28 April 2002. The race started in Arco and finished in Lienz. The race was won by Francesco Casagrande.

== General classification ==
Final general classification

Rank	Rider	Time
1	Francesco Casagrande (ITA)	18h 03' 06"
2	Julio Alberto Pérez (MEX)	+ 28"
3	Gilberto Simoni (ITA)	+ 45"
4	Peter Luttenberger (AUT)	+ 53"
5	Stefano Garzelli (ITA)	+ 56"
6	Tadej Valjavec (SLO)	+ 1' 02"
7	Faat Zakirov (RUS)	+ 1' 02"
8	Andrey Teteryuk (KAZ)	+ 1' 10"
9	Gerhard Trampusch (AUT)	+ 1' 21"
10	Massimo Codol (ITA)	+ 1' 26"
