= 1999 Tour de Suisse =

Race details
- Dates: 15–24 June 1999
- Stages: 9 + Prologue
- Distance: 1,401 km (870.5 mi)
- Winning time: 35h 22' 40"

Results
	Winner	Francesco Casagrande (ITA)	(Vini Caldirola)
	Second	Laurent Jalabert (FRA)	(ONCE–Deutsche Bank)
	Third	Gilberto Simoni (ITA)	(Ballan–Alessio)

The 1999 Tour de Suisse was the 63rd edition of the Tour de Suisse cycle race and was held from 15 June to 24 June 1999. The race started in Solothurn and finished in Winterthur. The race was won by Francesco Casagrande of the Vini Caldirola team.

== Teams ==
Seventeen teams of up to nine riders started the race:

- Lampre–Daikin
- Mapei–Quick-Step
- Rabobank
- ONCE–Deutsche Bank
- Team Polti
- Cofidis
- Saeco–Cannondale
- Team Telekom
- Française des Jeux
- Vini Caldirola
- Cantina Tollo–Alexia Alluminio
- Ballan–Alessio
- Mobilvetta Design–Northwave
- Amica Chips–Costa de Almeria
- Post Swiss Team
- Amore & Vita–Giubileo 2000–Beretta
- Ericsson–Villiger

== Route ==
Stage characteristics and winners
Stage	Date	Course	Distance	Type	Winner
P	15 June	Solothurn	6 km (3.7 mi)	Individual time trial	Laurent Jalabert (FRA)
1	16 June	Solothurn to Lausanne	200 km (124.3 mi)		Pascal Richard (SUI)
2	17 June	Lausanne to Küssnacht am Rigi	220.6 km (137.1 mi)		Silvio Martinello (ITA)
3	18 June	Bellinzona to Chiasso	167.5 km (104.1 mi)		Gabriele Missaglia (ITA)
4	19 June	Bellinzona to Grindelwald	171.4 km (106.5 mi)		Gilberto Simoni (ITA)
5	20 June	Meiringen to Meiringen	29.5 km (18.3 mi)	Individual time trial	Viatcheslav Ekimov (RUS)
6	21 June	Küssnacht am Rigi to Mauren (Liechtenstein)	162 km (100.7 mi)		Matthew White (AUS)
7	22 June	Landeck (Austria) to Nauders am Reschenpass (Austria)	47.5 km (29.5 mi) (Note: The stage was planned to be 163.9 km (101.8 mi), starting from Mauren, but was shortened due to bad weather.)		Oscar Camenzind (SUI)
8	23 June	Nauders am Reschenpass to Arosa	168.6 km (104.8 mi)		Francesco Casagrande (ITA)
9	24 June	Chur to Winterthur	225.2 km (139.9 mi)		Maurizio De Pasquale (ITA)

== General classification ==
Final general classification

Rank	Rider	Team	Time
1	Francesco Casagrande (ITA)	Vini Caldirola	35h 22' 40"
2	Laurent Jalabert (FRA)	ONCE–Deutsche Bank	+ 1' 04"
3	Gilberto Simoni (ITA)	Ballan–Alessio	+ 1' 11"
4	Laurent Dufaux (SUI)	Saeco–Cannondale	+ 1' 16"
5	Oscar Camenzind (SUI)	Lampre–Daikin	+ 1' 45"
6	Sven Montgomery (SUI)	Post Swiss Team	+ 3' 57"
7	Roberto Sgambelluri (ITA)	Cantina Tollo–Alexia Alluminio	+ 4' 21"
8	Giuseppe Guerini (ITA)	Team Telekom	+ 4' 21"
9	Mikel Zarrabeitia (ESP)	ONCE–Deutsche Bank	+ 4' 29"
10	Pavel Tonkov (RUS)	Mapei–Quick-Step	+ 4' 32"
