= 2003 Giro del Trentino =

Race details
- Dates: 24–27 April 2003
- Stages: 4
- Distance: 658.8 km (409.4 mi)
- Winning time: 17h 52' 43"

Results
	Winner	Gilberto Simoni (ITA)
	Second	Stefano Garzelli (ITA)
	Third	Tadej Valjavec (SLO)

The 2003 Giro del Trentino was the 27th edition of the Tour of the Alps cycle race and was held on 24 April to 27 April 2003. The race started and finished in Arco. The race was won by Gilberto Simoni.

== General classification ==
Final general classification

Rank	Rider	Time
1	Gilberto Simoni (ITA)	17h 52' 43"
2	Stefano Garzelli (ITA)	+ 9"
3	Tadej Valjavec (SLO)	+ 24"
4	Leonardo Bertagnolli (ITA)	+ 1' 18"
5	Graziano Gasparre (ITA)	+ 1' 50"
6	Paolo Lanfranchi (ITA)	+ 1' 50"
7	Félix García Casas (ESP)	+ 1' 50"
8	Sylwester Szmyd (POL)	+ 1' 55"
9	José Castelblanco (COL)	+ 1' 57"
10	Paolo Tiralongo (ITA)	+ 2' 00"
