= Stefano Garzelli =

Italian cyclist (born 1973)

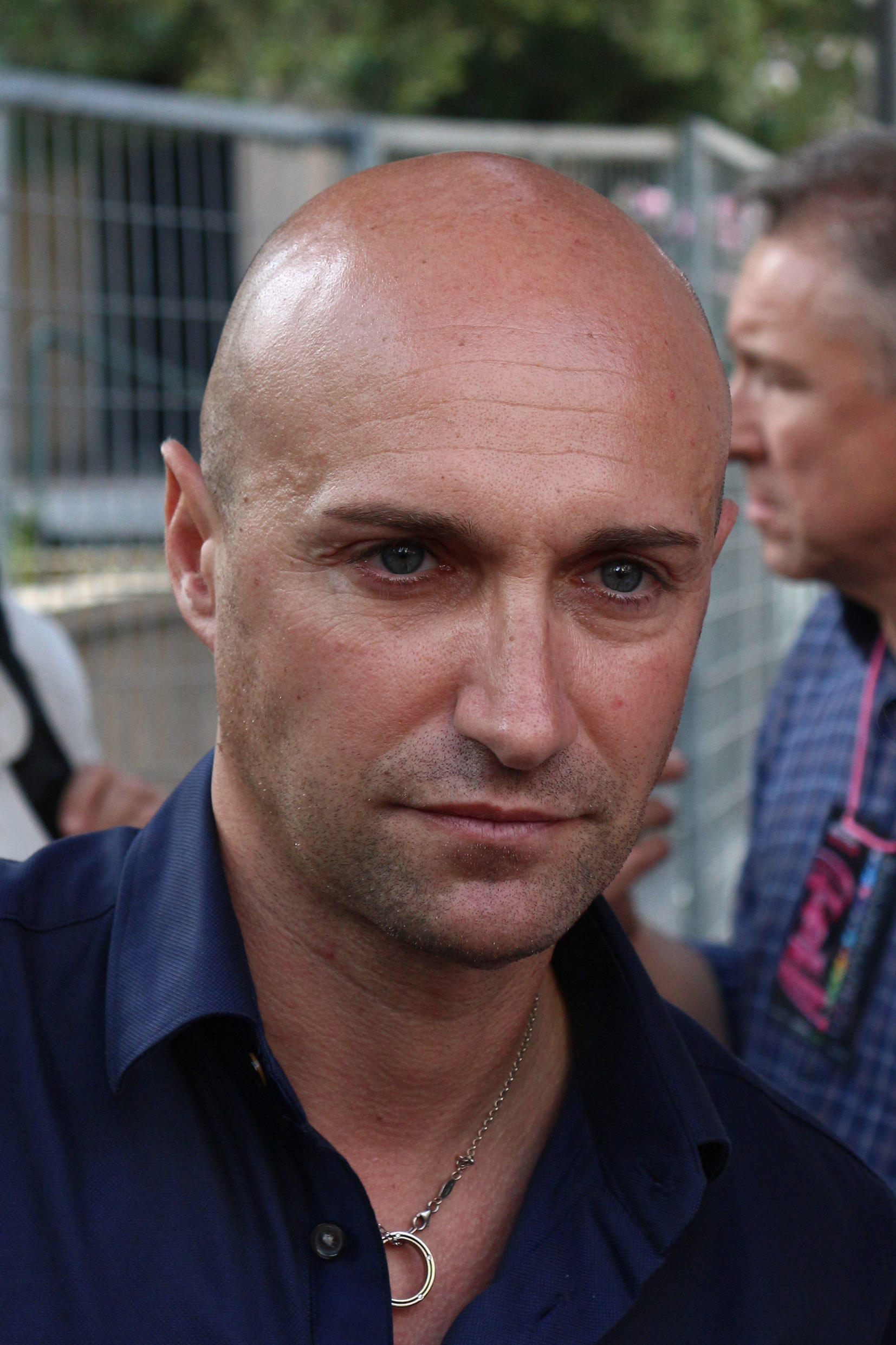
- Garzelli at the 2014 Giro d'Italia

Personal information
- Full name: Stefano Garzelli
- Born: 16 July 1973 (age 53) Varese, Italy

Cycling career
- Sport: Cycling
- Discipline: Road
- Role: Rider
- Rider type: All-rounder

Professional teams
- 1997–2000: Mercatone Uno
- 2001–2002: Mapei–Quick-Step
- 2003–2004: Vini Caldirola–So.di
- 2005–2006: Liquigas–Bianchi
- 2007–2012: Acqua & Sapone–Caffè Mokambo
- 2013: Vini Fantini–Selle Italia

Major wins
- Grand Tours Giro d'Italia General classification (2000) Mountains classification (2009, 2011) 7 individual stages (2000, 2003, 2004, 2007, 2010) Stage races Tour de Suisse (1998) Tirreno–Adriatico (2010)

Stefano Garzelli (born 16 July 1973) is an Italian former professional road racing cyclist, who competed as a professional between 1997 and 2013. The high point of his career was his overall win in the 2000 Giro d'Italia, after a close three-way competition with Gilberto Simoni and Francesco Casagrande.

== Career ==
Born in Varese, Garzelli started out as being a domestique for Marco Pantani but proved in 2000 that he deserved much more. When "The Pirate" lacked form in the beginning of the 2000 Giro, Garzelli was left free of all team duties for Mercatone Uno–Albacom, and was able to fight and win his own battle in the Giro. In the final time-trial stage Garzelli took the race leadership away from Casagrande, who was suffering an inflamed sciatic nerve. Casagrande was devastated, and Garzelli dedicated his win to Pantani.

After his win of the 2000 Giro d'Italia he was recruited by the Italian super-team Mapei–Quick-Step in 2001, aiming to repeat his 2000 Giro success. The start of the season showed promise, with Garzelli being a key player in teammate Paolo Bettini's win in Liège–Bastogne–Liège, with Garzelli himself finishing second. The finale of the race saw Bettini and Garzelli make tactical moves to benefit from each other's attacks and saw them finish the race with a comfortable margin to decide the win amongst themselves.

However, after already winning two stages at the event, Garzelli was caught in the 2002 doping scandal in the Giro d'Italia, and was forced out of the race. Many believe that the circumstances of his suspension prompted the Mapei boss Giorgio Squinzi to terminate his sponsorship of the team at the end of the year. "The exclusion of Garzelli, who tested positive for a masking agent, wasn't a normal thing. At the start nothing was found. Later, as soon as he won a stage, a forbidden substance came out all of a sudden. That's bizarre," said Squinzi in an interview. In a 2011 interview the Belgian double world champion Freddy Maertens cast doubt on whether Garzelli had deliberately used the steroid masking agent concerned, the diuretic Probenecid, likening it to an incident to the 1974 world championships in which he claimed that his water bottle had been deliberately sabotaged by the soigneur of his rival Eddy Merckx.

Garzelli was able to mount a comeback for the 2003 Giro d'Italia and was able to challenge eventual winner Gilberto Simoni in the race.

In 2006, for the first time since he was a professional, he decided not to race the Giro d'Italia, but instead to prepare for the Classics, training with some of his Liquigas-Bianchi teammates (including Danilo Di Luca, Patrick Calcagni and Stefano Zanini) at high altitude in the region around Toluca, Mexico. He finished sixth in both in his first race of the season, Milan-Torino, and at Milan-San Remo, after an unsuccessful attack on the Cipressa hill. He accumulated placings during the first part of the season, without ever being able to win a race, until Rund um den Henninger-Turm where he bested German sprint specialists Gerald Ciolek, Danilo Hondo and Erik Zabel in a sprint finish.

In December 2012, Garzelli signed a one-year contract with the Vini Fantini–Selle Italia team for the 2013 season, and retired thereafter.

He now works for RAI the Italian national broadcaster as a summariser on the Cycling programmes covered by RAIsport such as the Giro d'Italia and Tour de France.

== Career achievements ==
=== Major results ===
1996
1st Piccolo Giro di Lombardia
1997
8th Overall Tour de Suisse
9th Overall Giro d'Italia
1998
1st Overall Tour de Suisse

1st Points classification
1st Stages 4 & 5

2nd Trofeo Forla de Navarra
3rd Rund um den Henninger Turm
6th Tour de Berne
1999
1st GP Miguel Induráin
1st Stage 3 Tour of the Basque Country
3rd Overall Tirreno–Adriatico
3rd À travers Lausanne
4th Milan–San Remo
5th Overall Settimana Internazionale di Coppi e Bartali
6th Overall Vuelta a Murcia
2000
1st Overall Giro d'Italia

1st Stage 18

1st GP Nobili Rubinetterie
Tour de Suisse

1st Mountains classification
1st Stage 8

1st Stage 4 Settimana Lombarda
2nd Grand Prix of Aargau Canton
6th GP Miguel Induráin
7th Milan–San Remo
10th Coppa Ugo Agostoni
2001
1st Stage 5a Tour of the Basque Country
1st Stage 6 Tour de Suisse
5th Overall Giro del Trentino
4th Gran Premio Città di Camaiore
5th Coppa Ugo Agostoni
6th Clásica de San Sebastián
6th GP Industria & Artigianato di Larciano
2002
1st GP Industria & Artigianato di Larciano
2nd Liège–Bastogne–Liège
5th Overall Giro del Trentino
9th Overall Tour of the Basque Country
2003
2nd Overall Giro d'Italia

1st Stages 3 & 7

2nd Overall Giro del Trentino

1st Stage 1

2004
1st Overall Vuelta a Aragón
1st Stage 2 Tour de Romandie
4th Overall Setmana Catalana
6th Overall Giro d'Italia

1st Stage 19

2005
1st Tre Valli Varesine
1st Points classification, Tour de Romandie
2nd Trofeo Melinda
4th Clásica de San Sebastián
6th Giro del Lazio
2006
1st Rund um den Henninger Turm
1st Tre Valli Varesine
1st Trofeo Melinda
1st Stage 4 Tour de Luxembourg
2nd Clásica de San Sebastián
4th GP Miguel Induráin
5th Road race, National Road Championships
5th Giro del Lazio
6th Milano–Torino
7th Milan–San Remo
2007
Giro d'Italia

1st Stages 14 & 16

1st Stage 3 Giro del Trentino
1st Stage 2 Tour of Slovenia
4th Coppa Sabatini
7th Overall Vuelta a Murcia
8th Memorial Cimurri
2008
1st Grand Prix de Wallonie
1st Trofeo Melinda
Vuelta a Asturias

1st Stages 2a & 3

2nd Overall Giro del Trentino

1st Stages 2 & 4

2nd Overall Vuelta a Murcia
2nd Overall Settimana Internazionale di Coppi e Bartali
3rd Subida al Naranco
3rd Coppa Sabatini
5th Tre Valli Varesine
8th Giro di Lombardia
8th Coppa Bernocchi
10th Overall Vuelta a Burgos
10th Giro del Lazio
2009
2nd Overall Tirreno–Adriatico
2nd Trofeo Melinda
3rd Overall Giro della Provincia di Grosseto
3rd Clásica de Almería
4th Overall Giro del Trentino
5th Overall Giro d'Italia

1st Mountains classification

9th Grand Prix de Wallonie
10th Trofeo Laigueglia
2010
1st Overall Tirreno–Adriatico

1st Points classification

1st Stage 16 (ITT) Giro d'Italia
2011
1st Mountains classification, Giro d'Italia
7th GP Industria & Artigianato di Larciano
2012
4th Tour Méditerranéen
4th Overall Settimana Internazionale di Coppi e Bartali

==== General classification results timeline ====
Grand Tour general classification results
Grand Tour	1997	1998	1999	2000	2001	2002	2003	2004	2005	2006	2007	2008	2009	2010	2011	2012	2013
Giro d'Italia	9	21	DNF	1	DNF	DNF	2	6	DNF	—	16	—	7	DNF	26	—	108
Tour de France	—	—	32	—	14	—	DNF	—	32	55	—	—	—	—	—	—	—
Vuelta a España	—	—	—	—	—	—	—	11	—	—	—	—	—	—	—	—	—
Major stage race general classification results
Race	1997	1998	1999	2000	2001	2002	2003	2004	2005	2006	2007	2008	2009	2010	2011	2012	2013
Paris–Nice	Did not contest during his career																
/ Tirreno–Adriatico	—	—	3	—	—	13	—	—	—	16	19	—	2	1	79	27	79
Volta a Catalunya	—	—	DNF	—	—	—	DNF	—	—	—	—	—	—	—	—	—	—
Tour of the Basque Country	50	—	48	37	45	9	—	—	56	63	—	—	—	—	—	—	—
/ Tour de Romandie	—	41	DNF	—	—	—	—	29	23	—	—	—	—	—	—	—	—
Critérium du Dauphiné	Did not contest during his career																
Tour de Suisse	8	1	—	36	23	—	—	—	—	27	—	—	—	—	—	—	—

Legend
—	Did not compete
DNF	Did not finish

== See also ==
- List of doping cases in cycling
- List of sportspeople sanctioned for doping offences
