= Trofeo Melinda =

Race details
- Date: Late August (until 2012); June (2013–2014)
- Region: Trentino-Südtirol, Italy
- English name: Melinda Trophy
- Local name: Trofeo Melinda (in Italian)
- Discipline: Road
- Competition: UCI Europe Tour
- Type: One-day
- Organiser: Gruppo Sportivo Melinda
- Web site: www.trofeomelinda.it

History
- First edition: 1992
- Editions: 23
- Final edition: 2014
- First winner: Maurizio Fondriest (ITA)
- Most wins: Francesco Casagrande (ITA); Davide Rebellin (ITA); Vincenzo Nibali (ITA) (2 wins)
- Final winner: Vincenzo Nibali (ITA)

Trofeo Melinda was a single-day road bicycle race held annually in Trentino-Alto Adige/Südtirol, Italy. After 2005, the race was organised as a 1.1 event on the UCI Europe Tour. It was created after the disappearance of Giro dell'Umbria, held between 1910 and 1991. In 2013 and 2014, the Trofeo Melinda was run as the Italian National Road Race Championships. After 2014, the race was merged with the nearby early-season stage-race Giro del Trentino.

== Winners ==
Year	Country	Rider	Team
1992	Italy	Maurizio Fondriest	Panasonic–Sportlife
1993	Italy	Stefano Della Santa	Mapei
1994	Italy	Massimo Podenzana	Navigare–Blue Storm
1995	Switzerland	Pascal Richard	MG Maglificio–Technogym
1996	Italy	Andrea Tafi	Mapei–GB
1997	Italy	Michele Bartoli	MG Maglificio–Technogym
1998	Italy	Rodolfo Ongarato	Ballan
1999	Italy	Mauro Gianetti	Vini Caldirola
2000	Slovenia	Gorazd Stangelj	Liquigas–Pata
2001	Italy	Francesco Casagrande	Fassa Bortolo
2002	Switzerland	Laurent Dufaux	Alessio
2003	Italy	Francesco Casagrande	Lampre
2004	Italy	Davide Rebellin	Gerolsteiner
2005	Italy	Damiano Cunego	Lampre–Caffita
2006	Italy	Stefano Garzelli	Liquigas
2007	Italy	Santo Anzà	Diquigiovanni–Selle Italia
2008	Italy	Leonardo Bertagnolli	Liquigas
2009	Italy	Giovanni Visconti	ISD–NERI
2010	Italy	Vincenzo Nibali	Liquigas–Doimo
2011	Italy	Davide Rebellin	Miche–Guerciotti
2012	Colombia	Carlos Betancur	Acqua & Sapone
2013*	Italy	Ivan Santaromita	BMC Racing Team
2014*	Italy	Vincenzo Nibali	Astana

*Held as Italian National Road Race Championship
