= 1998 Amstel Gold Race =

Dutch cycling race

The 1998 Amstel Gold Race was the 33rd edition of the annual Amstel Gold Race road bicycle race, held on Sunday April 25, 1998, in the Dutch province of Limburg. The race stretched 257.3 kilometres, with the start and finish in Maastricht. There were 193 competitors, with 84 cyclists finishing the race.

== Results ==
	Cyclist	Team	Time
1	Rolf Järmann (SUI)	Casino–Ag2r	6h 43' 20"
2	Maarten den Bakker (NED)	Rabobank	s.t.
3	Michele Bartoli (ITA)	Asics–CGA	+ 21"
4	Michael Boogerd (NED)	Rabobank	s.t.
5	Bo Hamburger (DEN)	Casino–Ag2r	s.t.
6	Germano Pierdomenico (ITA)	Cantina Tollo–Alexia Alluminio	+ 32"
7	Laurent Dufaux (SUI)	Festina–Lotus	s.t.
8	Andrei Tchmil (BEL)	Lotto–Mobistar	+ 2' 27"
9	Alberto Elli (ITA)	Casino–Ag2r	s.t.
10	Andrea Ferrigato (ITA)	Vitalicio Seguros	s.t.
