= Diego Caccia =

Italian cyclist

Personal information
- Full name: Diego Caccia
- Born: 31 July 1981 (age 45) Ponte San Pietro, Italy

Cycling career
- Sport: Cycling
- Discipline: Road
- Role: Rider

Professional teams
- 2003: →Saeco (stagiaire)
- 2005: GS Podenzano-Brunero
- 2006–2009: Barloworld
- 2010: ISD–NERI
- 2011–2012: Farnese Vini–Neri Sottoli

Diego Caccia (born 31 July 1981) is an Italian racing cyclist.
