= Francesco Casagrande =

Italian cyclist (born 1970)

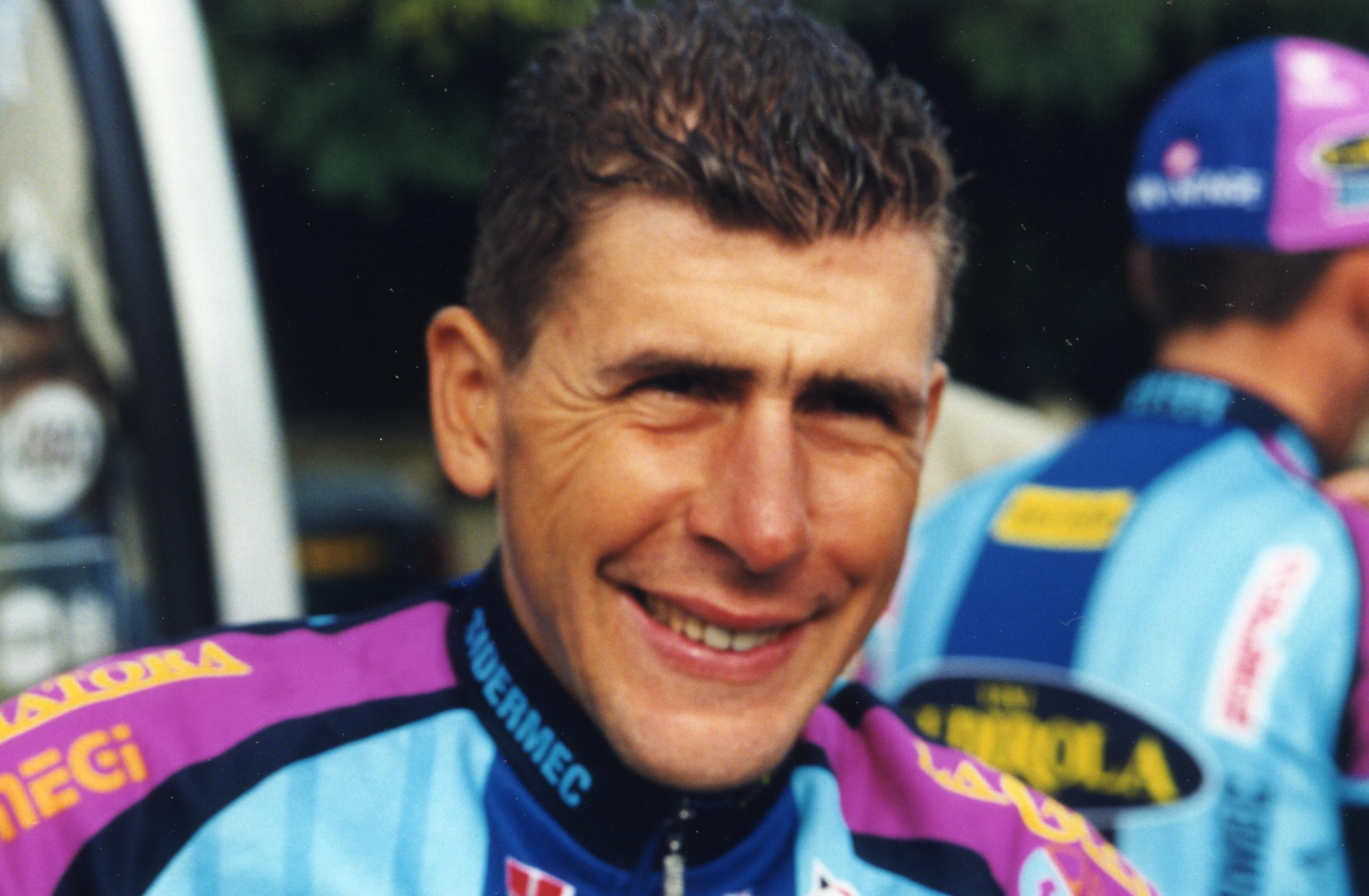

Personal information
- Full name: Francesco Casagrande
- Born: 14 September 1970 (age 56) Florence, Italy
- Height: 1.72 m (5 ft 7 1/2 in)
- Weight: 64 kg (141 lb; 10 st 1 lb)

Cycling career
- Sport: Cycling
- Current team: Retired
- Discipline: Road
- Role: Rider

Professional teams
- 1992–1995: Mercatone Uno–Medeghini–Zucchini
- 1996–1997: Saeco–AS Juvenes San Marino
- 1998: Cofidis
- 1999-2000: Vini Caldirola
- 2001–2002: Fassa Bortolo
- 2003–2004: Lampre
- 2004: Vini Caldirola–Nobili Rubinetterie
- 2005: Naturino–Sapore di Mare

Major wins
- Grand Tours Giro d'Italia Mountains classification (2000) 1 individual stage (2000) Stage Races Tirreno–Adriatico (1996) Tour of the Basque Country (1996) Tour de Suisse (1999) Giro del Trentino (2001, 2002) One-Day Races and Classics La Flèche Wallonne (2000) Clásica de San Sebastián (1998, 1999)

Francesco Casagrande (born 14 September 1970 in Florence) is an Italian former professional road racing cyclist. Casagrande was a professional cyclist between 1992 and 2005.

== Biography ==
He was a proven performer in the Grand Tours and the major one-day races. He wore the leader's jersey into the penultimate stage of the 2000 Giro d'Italia, but faltered badly and wound up 2nd to fellow Italian Stefano Garzelli. Casagrande did, however, win the mountains classification, wearing the corresponding green jersey on the podium.

In major one-day races, he has won the Clásica de San Sebastián in 1998 and 1999, followed by the 2000 editions of the La Flèche Wallonne and Subida a Urkiola. Also in 1999, he placed 4th in the World Cycling Championships Road Race behind Óscar Freire, Markus Zberg, and Jean-Cyril Robin.

In his early career, Casagrande won the 1996 Tirreno–Adriatico and Tour of the Basque Country — both one-week stage races. In 1998, Casagrande tested positive for doping with testosterone during the Tour de Romandie, and consequently was fired by his team Cofidis. He was originally given a six-month sentence, later extended to nine months by the UCI. He returned to racing at the 1999 Tour de Suisse, a race that he won, taking the leader's jersey away from Laurent Jalabert on stage 9. Casagrande also scored victories at the 2001 and 2002 Giro del Trentino and the 2002 Settimana Ciclistica Internazionale Coppi-Bartali. In the 2002 Giro d'Italia, Casagrande was expelled from the race, after knocking down another cyclist. In 2003, Casagrande won two mountain stages in the Tour de Suisse, but lost the leader's jersey in the penultimate day's time trial to Alexander Vinokourov. He was unable to start the last stage due to urethritis. Casagrande was barred from competing in the 2004 Vuelta a España a day before its start due to a high hematocrit level, indicating the use of erythropoietin (EPO), a popular doping product. As a consequence, the Lampre team released him from his contract, allowing him to move mid-season to Vini Caldirola–Nobili Rubinetterie. In 2005, Casagrande retired.

== Major results ==
1991
1st Overall Girobio
1992
2nd Gran Premio Industrie del Marmo
1993
1st Stage 5 Giro di Puglia
2nd Tre Valli Varesine
4th Giro di Toscana
6th Overall Giro del Trentino
7th Giro della Romagna
7th Giro del Veneto
7th Giro dell'Appennino
8th Giro di Campania
10th Trofeo Melinda
1994
1st Milano–Torino
1st Giro di Toscana
1st Giro dell'Emilia
1st Firenze–Pistoia
1st GP Industria & Artigianato di Larciano
2nd Road race, National Road Championships
2nd Overall Vuelta a los Valles Mineros
2nd Coppa Sabatini
2nd Coppa Placci
2nd Coppa Bernocchi
2nd Trofeo Melinda
2nd Trofeo dello Scalatore
4th Overall Tour of the Basque Country
4th Trofeo Matteotti
5th Overall Tirreno–Adriatico
5th Overall Settimana Internazionale di Coppi e Bartali
6th La Flèche Wallonne
7th Overall Critérium International
8th Giro della Romagna
8th Monte Carlo–Alassio
10th Züri-Metzgete
1995
1st Giro dell'Appennino
1st Coppa Placci
1st Firenze–Pistoia
2nd Overall Tour de Romandie
2nd Grand Prix Pino Cerami
2nd Gran Premio Città di Camaiore
3rd Overall Escalada a Montjuïc
3rd Milano–Torino
3rd Coppa Agostoni
3rd Giro della Romagna
4th La Flèche Wallonne
4th Coppa Sabatini
5th Liège–Bastogne–Liège
6th Overall Setmana Catalana de Ciclisme
6th Coppa Bernocchi
7th Giro di Lombardia
8th Trofeo Pantalica
10th Overall Giro d'Italia
1996
1st Overall Tirreno–Adriatico
1st Overall Tour of the Basque Country

1st Stages 2 & 5b (ITT)

2nd Overall Giro di Puglia

1st Stage 3

2nd GP Industria & Artigianato di Larciano
3rd Overall Setmana Catalana de Ciclisme
4th Overall Hofbrau Cup
4th Tre Valli Varesine
4th Coppa Agostoni
5th Milano–Torino
9th Clásica de San Sebastián
10th Trofeo Laigueglia
1997
1st Giro della Romagna
2nd Road race, National Road Championships
3rd Giro di Lombardia
3rd Trofeo Laigueglia
3rd Giro del Lazio
4th Overall Escalada a Montjuïc
4th Milan–San Remo
4th Giro dell'Appennino
4th Trofeo Matteotti
4th Coppa Placci
5th Overall Tour Méditerranéen
5th Trofeo Melinda
5th Gran Premio Bruno Beghelli
6th Overall Tour de France
6th Overall Setmana Catalana de Ciclisme
6th Gran Premio Industria e Commercio di Prato
6th GP Industria & Artigianato di Larciano
8th Coppa Sabatini
9th Overall Tirreno–Adriatico
10th Overall Volta a la Comunitat Valenciana
1998
1st Clásica de San Sebastián
1st Trofeo Matteotti
1st Stage 1 Tour Méditerranéen
2nd Classique des Alpes
3rd Overall Tour de Romandie
3rd Overall Giro del Trentino
4th Liège–Bastogne–Liège
4th Gran Premio Città di Camaiore
5th Overall Tour de Suisse
8th Tour du Haut Var
1999
1st Overall Tour de Suisse

1st Stage 8

1st Clásica de San Sebastián
1st Trofeo Matteotti
2nd Giro del Veneto
2nd Giro del Lazio
2nd Gran Premio Città di Camaiore
3rd Tre Valli Varesine
3rd Giro della Romagna
3rd Coppa Agostoni
3rd Coppa Placci
3rd Gran Premio Industria e Commercio di Prato
4th Road race, UCI Road World Championships
5th Giro dell'Emilia
9th Milano–Torino
2000
1st La Flèche Wallonne
1st Coppa Placci
1st Subida a Urkiola
2nd Overall Giro d'Italia

1st Mountains classification
1st Stage 9

2nd Giro di Lombardia
2nd HEW Cyclassics
2nd Giro del Veneto
3rd Züri-Metzgete
3rd Gran Premio Città di Camaiore
4th Giro del Lazio
5th GP Industria & Artigianato di Larciano
9th Liège–Bastogne–Liège
10th Road race, UCI Road World Championships
10th Overall Settimana Internazionale di Coppi e Bartali
10th Amstel Gold Race
2001
1st Overall Giro del Trentino

1st Stage 1

1st Coppa Agostoni
1st Trofeo Melinda
2nd Clásica de San Sebastián
2nd Giro dell'Emilia
2nd Gran Premio Industria e Commercio di Prato
2nd GP Industria & Artigianato di Larciano
4th Overall Route du Sud

1st Stage 4

4th Liège–Bastogne–Liège
4th Giro del Veneto
4th Züri-Metzgete
5th Trofeo Pantalica
5th Firenze–Pistoia
6th Overall Tour of the Basque Country
6th La Flèche Wallonne
6th Gran Premio Città di Camaiore
8th Giro della Provincia di Siracusa
2002
1st Overall Giro del Trentino

1st Stage 2

1st Overall Settimana Internazionale di Coppi e Bartali
2nd Trofeo Melinda
2nd Firenze–Pistoia
3rd Road race, National Road Championships
3rd Gran Premio Città di Camaiore
3rd GP Industria & Artigianato di Larciano
4th Giro del Veneto
5th Giro di Lombardia
5th Grand Prix of Aargau Canton
6th Trofeo Pantalica
7th Overall Vuelta a España
8th Liège–Bastogne–Liège
9th Overall Tour de Suisse

1st Stage 5

10th La Flèche Wallonne
2003
1st Coppa Agostoni
1st Trofeo Melinda
Tour de Suisse

1st Stages 3 & 5

2nd Overall Settimana Internazionale di Coppi e Bartali

1st Stage 1b (TTT)

2nd Overall Brixia Tour
3rd Overall Euskal Bizikleta

1st Stage 4a

4th Clásica de San Sebastián
5th Liège–Bastogne–Liège
5th Giro dell'Emilia
5th Giro di Toscana
5th Coppa Placci
5th Gran Premio Industria e Commercio di Prato
5th GP Industria & Artigianato di Larciano
6th Amstel Gold Race
7th Gran Premio Città di Camaiore
2004
2nd Giro dell'Emilia
2nd Subida a Urkiola
3rd Milano–Torino
8th Coppa Sabatini
9th Trofeo Matteotti
2005
5th Overall Settimana Internazionale di Coppi e Bartali

=== Grand Tour general classification results timeline ===
Grand Tour	1993	1994	1995	1996	1997	1998	1999	2000	2001	2002	2003	2004
Giro d'Italia	40	22	10	31	—	—	—	2	DNF	DSQ	DNF	—
Tour de France	—	—	—	—	6	DNF	—	—	DNF	—	—	—
/ Vuelta a España	—	—	—	—	—	—	—	—	—	7	—	DNS

Legend
—	Did not compete
DNF	Did not finish
DSQ	Disqualified

== See also ==
- List of doping cases in cycling
- List of sportspeople sanctioned for doping offences
