= Salvatore Commesso =

Italian cyclist

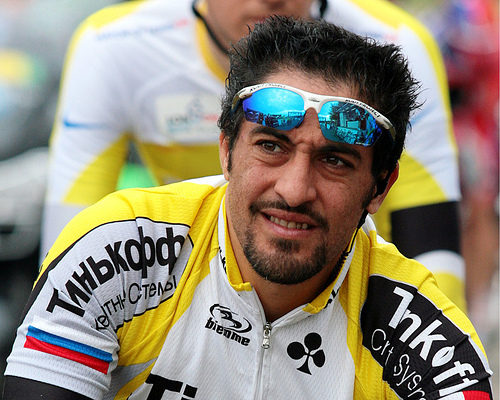
- Commesso at the 2007 Tour of Britain

Personal information
- Full name: Salvatore Commesso
- Nickname: Toto
- Born: March 28, 1975 (age 51) Torre del Greco, Italy
- Height: 1.64 m (5 ft 5 in)
- Weight: 66 kg (146 lb)

Cycling career
- Sport: Cycling
- Discipline: Road
- Role: Rider

Amateur teams
- 1994: S.C. Villa d'Almè
- 1995: Cosmos GMG
- 1996–1997: Casini–Vellutex
- 1996: Saeco–AS Juvenes San Marino (stagiaire)

Professional teams
- 1998–2004: Saeco–Cannondale
- 2005–2006: Lampre–Caffita
- 2007: Tinkoff Credit Systems
- 2008: Preti Mangimi
- 2009: Meridiana–Kalev Chocolate
- 2010: Meridiana–Kamen

Major wins
- Grand Tours Tour de France 2 individual stages (1999, 2000) One-day races and Classics National Road Race Championships (1999, 2002)
Medal record
Road cycling
Representing Czech Republic
European Under-23 Road Championships
Gold medal – first place	1997 Villach	Road race
Mediterranean Games
Gold medal – first place	1997 Bari	Road race

Salvatore Commesso (born March 28, 1975) is an Italian former professional road bicycle racer.

He was born in Torre del Greco, Campania, and turned professional in 1998. That year he placed in third in the Grand Prix de Suisse and the Giro del Capo. He won the Italian National Road Race Championships and Stage 13 of the Tour de France in 1999.

Commesso won Stage 18 of the 2000 Tour de France and won the points competition in the Volta a Portugal in 2001.

In 2002, he again won the Italian Championship, as well as the Trofeo Matteotti and the Criterium d'Abruzzo.

He rode for the Saeco–Cannondale team from 1998 to 2004. In 2005, the team merged with Lampre–Caffita, with whom he came in second in the Giro del Veneto.

He rode for Lampre in the 2006 Tour de France and finished second in Stage 14.

== Major results ==
1996
1st Giro del Mendrisiotto
1st Prologue & Stage 4 Giro Ciclistico d'Italia
5th Road race, European Under-23 Road Championships
10th Road race, UCI Road World Under-23 Championships
1997
1st Road race, European Under-23 Road Championships
1st Road race, Mediterranean Games
2nd Trofeo Alcide Degasperi
2nd Trofeo Gianfranco Bianchin
9th Road race, UCI Road World Under-23 Championships
1998
3rd Grand Prix de Suisse
3rd Overall Giro del Capo

1st Stage 1

4th HEW Cyclassics
4th First Union Invitational
1999
1st Road race, National Road Championships
1st Stage 13 Tour de France
1st Gran Premio Nobili Rubinetterie
5th Clásica de San Sebastián
7th Coppa Bernocchi
2000
1st Stage 18 Tour de France
5th First Union Invitational
9th First Union Classic
2001
Volta a Portugal

1st Points classification
1st Stages 3 & 9

8th Giro del Friuli
10th Trofeo Matteotti
2002
1st Road race, National Road Championships
1st Trofeo Matteotti
1st Criterium d'Abruzzo
4th Coppa Bernocchi
2003
3rd Road race, National Road Championships
2005
2nd Giro del Veneto
4th Coppa Agostoni
4th Gran Premio Città di Camaiore
7th HEW Cyclassics
9th GP Nobili Rubinetterie
2006
Combativity award Stage 14, Tour de France
2007
1st Mountains classification, Tirreno–Adriatico
2008
1st Stage 5 Tour de Luxembourg
8th Overall Tour of Belgium
2009
5th SEB Tartu Grand Prix
8th Overall Tour de Serbie
