= Asics–CGA =

Italian cycling team

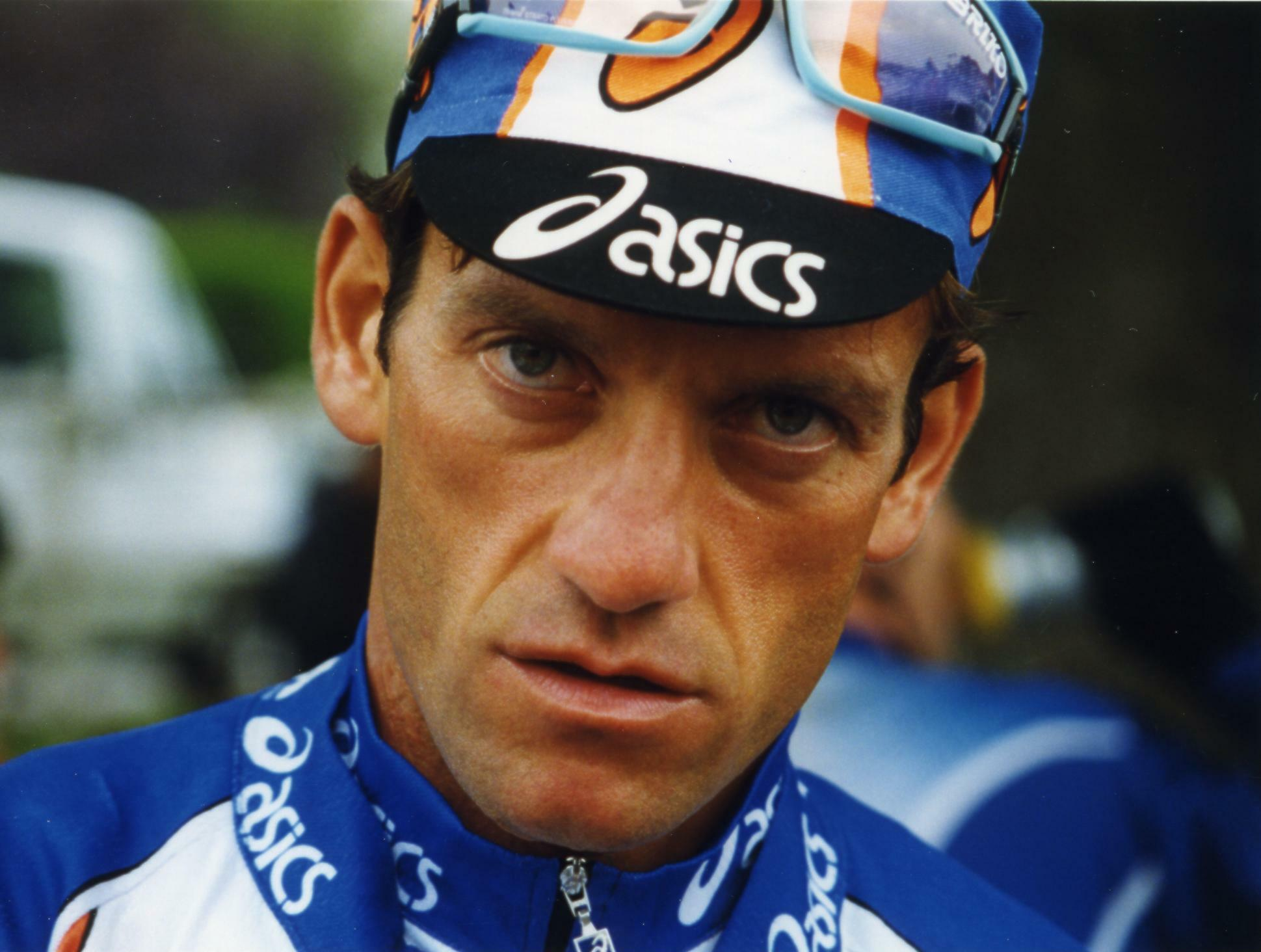
- Fabio Roscioli at the 1998 Paris–Tours

Team information
- UCI code: ASI
- Registered: Italy
- Founded: 1997
- Disbanded: 1998
- Discipline: Road
- Status: GSI

Key personnel
- General manager: Davide Boifava

Team name history
- 1997–1998: Asics–CGA

Asics–CGA (UCI team code: ASI) was an Italian cycling team that existed for the 1997 and 1998 seasons.

== Major results ==
1997
Stage 15 Giro d'Italia, Alessandro Baronti
GP Città di Rio Saliceto e Correggio, Federico Colonna
Overall Hofbrau Cup, Fabio Roscioli

1998
Stages 2 & 6 Tour Méditerranéen, Michele Bartoli
Stage 3 Giro di Calabria, Michele Bartoli
Stage 3 Volta a la Comunitat Valenciana, Federico Colonna
Overall Driedaagse van De Panne, Michele Bartoli
Liège–Bastogne–Liège, Michele Bartoli
GP du canton d'Argovie, Michele Bartoli
Stage 4a Tour de Romandie, Paolo Bettini
Stage 11 Giro d'Italia, Andrea Noè
Stage 13 Giro d'Italia, Michele Bartoli
GP Città di Rio Saliceto e Correggio, Federico Colonna
Züri-Metzgete, Michele Bartoli
UCI U23 Road World Championships, Ivan Basso
3rd UCI Road World Championships, Michele Bartoli
UCI World Ranking, Michele Bartoli
UCI Road World Cup
