= List of wins by Mapei and its successors =

This is a comprehensive list of victories of the Mapei cycling team. The races are categorized according to the UCI Continental Circuits rules

== 1993 Mapei ==
Trofeo Melinda, Stefano Della Santa

== 1994 Mapei–Clas ==
Züri-Metzgete, Gianluca Bortolami
UCI Road World Cup, Gianluca Bortolami
Overall Vuelta a España, Tony Rominger
Overall Vuelta Ciclista al País Vasco, Tony Rominger
Overall Paris–Nice, Tony Rominger
One Hour World Record, Tony Rominger

== 1995 Mapei–GB ==
Giro Ciclistico d'Italia, Giuseppe di Grande
Critérium Bavikhoeve, Johan Museeuw
Grand Prix Eddy Merckx, Johan Museeuw
Vuelta Ciclista a Murcia, Adriano Baffi
Four Days of Dunkirk, Johan Museeuw
Vuelta a Andalucía, Stefano Dell Santa
Clasica Internacional a Alcobendas
Trofeo Laigueglia, Johan Museeuw
Omloop Het Volk, Franco Ballerini
Cholet-Pays de la Loire, Frank Vandenbroucke
E3 Prijs Vlaanderen, Bart Leysen
Tour of Flanders, Johan Museeuw
Stage 4 Vuelta Ciclista al País Vasco, Tony Rominger
Paris–Roubaix, Franco Ballerini
Overall Tour de Romandie, Tony Rominger

Prologue, Stages 3 & 4b Tony Rominger

Overall Giro d'Italia, Tony Rominger

Points classification, Tony Rominger
Intermediate Sprints classification, Tony Rominger
Stages 2 (ITT), 4, 10 (ITT) & 17 (ITT), Tony Rominger

Flèche Hesbignonne, Wilfired Pieters
Züri-Metzgete, Johan Museeuw
Druivenkoers Overijse, Johan Museeuw
Schaal Sels – Merksem, Bart Leysen
Critérium Adinkerke, Frank Vandenbroucke
Kampioenschap van Vlaanderen, Johan Museeuw
Prologue, Stage 7 & 20 Vuelta a España, Abraham Olano
Paris–Bruxelles, Frank Vandenbroucke
Stage 19 Vuelta a España, Adriano Baffi
Critérium de Oostrozebeke, Adriano Baffi
World Road Race championships, Abraham Olano
Paris–Bourges, Daniele Nardello
Subida al Naranco, Abraham Olano
UCI Road World Cup, Johan Museeuw

== 1996 Mapei–GB ==
Trofeo Melinda, Andrea Tafi
Amsterdam Derny Race, Franco Ballerini
Spain National Road Race championships, Manuel Fernández
Critérium Bavikhoeve, Abraham Olano
Critérium Aalst, Tom Steels
Trofeo Manacor, Frederico Colonna
Overall Tour Méditerranéen, Frank Vandenbroucke
Overall Tour of Austria, Frank Vandenbroucke
Overall Circuit Cycliste Sarthe – Pays de la Loire, Adriano Baffi
Roma Maxima, Andrea Tafi
Coppa Placci, Andrea Tafi
Overall Vuelta a Burgos, Tony Rominger
Milano–Torino, Daniele Nardello
Binche–Tournai–Binche, Frank Vandenbroucke
Trofeo Laigueglia, Frank Vandenbroucke
Omloop Het Volk, Tom Steels
E3 Prijs Vlaanderen, Carlo Bomans
Brabantse Pijl, Johan Museeuw
Paris–Camembert, Adriano Baffi
Paris–Roubaix, Johan Museeuw
Scheldeprijs, Frank Vandenbroucke
Overall Tour de Romandie, Abraham Olano

Prologue & Stage 5, Abraham Olano

Grand Prix de Wallonie, Franco Ballerini
Binche–Tournai–Binche, Frank Vandenbroucke
Belgium National Road Race championships, Johan Museeuw
Circuito de Getxo, Arsenio Gonzalez
Boucles de l'Aulne, Abraham Olano
GP Ouest France–Plouay, Frank Vandenbroucke
Stage 2 Tour de Pologne, Federico Colonna
Stages 4 & 22 Vuelta a España, Tom Steels
Stages 10 (ITT) & 21 (ITT) Vuelta a España, Tony Rominger
Stage 12 Vuelta a España, Daniele Nardello
Paris–Bruxelles, Andrea Tafi
Subida al Naranco, Francisco Javier Mauleón
World Road Race championships, Johan Museeuw
Milano–Torino, Daniele Nardello
Giro di Lombardia, Andrea Tafi
UCI Road World Cup, Johan Museeuw

== 1997 Mapei–GB ==
GP Tell, Oscar Camenzind
Profronde van Almelo, Tom Steels
Four Days of Dunkirk, Johan Museeuw
Nacht van Peer, Johan Museeuw
Critérium Aalst, Frank Vandenbroucke
Critérium d'Abruzzo, Daniele Nardello
Overall Tour de Luxembourg, Frank Vandenbroucke
Overall Volta a Portugal, Zenon Jaskuła
Overall Tour of Austria, Daniele Nardello
Gala Tour de France, Johan Museeuw
Kuurne–Brussels–Kuurne, Johan Museeuw
Stages 1, 2, 4 & 8a Paris–Nice, Tom Steels
Brabantse Pijl, Gianluca Pianegonda
KBC Driedaagse van De Panne – Koksijde, Johan Museeuw
Stage 1 Vuelta Ciclista al País Vasco, Gabriele Missaglia
Stages 3 & 5a Vuelta Ciclista al País Vasco, Stefano Zanini
Overall Tour de Romandie, Pavel Tonkov

Stage 1, Giuseppe di Grande
Stage 4, Pavel Tonkov

Stages 3 (ITT), 5 & 21 Giro d'Italia, Pavel Tonkov
Stage 11 Giro d'Italia, Gabriele Missaglia
Stage 12 Giro d'Italia, Giuseppe Di Grande
Rund um Köln, Frank Vandenbroucke
Giro dell'Appennino, Pavel Tonkov
Stages 1 & 9 Tour de Suisse, Oscar Camenzind
Stages 1a, 2 & 4 Volta Ciclista a Catalunya,
Stage 7 Tour de Suisse, Tom Steels
Italy National Road Race championships, Gianni Faresin
Switzerland National Road Race championships, Oscar Camenzind
Belgium National Road Race championships, Tom Steels
Trofeo Matteotti, Frank Vandenbroucke
Wincanton Classic, Andrea Tafi
Schaal Sels – Merksem, Tom Steels
Grand Prix de Fourmies, Andrea Tafi
Stages 11, 16 & 17, Vuelta a España, Ján Svorada
Stages 13 & 15, Vuelta a España, Pavel Tonkov
Coppa Sabatini, Andrea Tafi
Gran Premio Bruno Beghelli, Stefano Zanini

== 1998 Mapei–Bricobi ==
Settimana Ciclistica Lombarda, Pavel Tonkov
Criterium Bavikhoeve, Andrea Tafi
Overall Tour de Wallonne, Frank Vandenbroucke
Roma Maxima, Andrea Tafi
Criterium Aalst, Tom Steels
Clasica de Ordizia, Frank Vandenbroucke
Overall Tour de Langkawi, Gabriele Missaglia
Gran Premio Bruno Beghelli, Stefano Zanini
Overall Paris–Nice, Frank Vandenbroucke

Prologue & Stage 4, Frank Vandenbroucke
Stages 2 & 3, Tom Steels

Stage 3 Tirreno–Adriatico, Ján Svorada
Dwars door Vlaanderen, Tom Steels
Stage3a KBC Driedaagse van De Panne – Koksijde, Stefano Zanini
E3 Prijs Vlaanderen, Johan Museeuw
Brabantse Pijl, Johan Museeuw
Ronde van Vlaanderen, Johan Museeuw
Gent–Wevelgem, Frank Vandenbroucke
Paris–Roubaix, Franco Ballerini
Stage 18 Giro d'Italia, Pavel Tonkov
Stages 2, 13, 19 & 22 Tour de France, Tom Steels
Giro dell'Appennino, Pavel Tonkov
Memorial Rik Van Steenbergen, Tom Steels
Belgium National road Race championships, Tom Steels
Italy National road Race championships, Andrea Tafi
Czech Republic National road Race championships, Ján Svorada
Stage 3 Tour de France, Ján Svorada
Stage 14 Tour de France, Daniele Nardello
Gran Premio Città di Camaiore, Andrea Tafi
Stage 1 Tour de Pologne,
Coppa Ugo Agostoni, Andrea Tafi
Stage 12 Vuelta a España, Gianni Bugno
Paris–Bruxelles, Stefano Zanini
Gran Premio Bruno Beghelli, Stefano Zanini
Critérium de Oostrozebeke, Tom Steels
World Road Race championships, Oscar Camenzind
n Wilfried Pieters
Giro di Lombardia, Oscar Camenzind

== 1999 Mapei–Quick Step ==
Criterium Bavikhoeve, Johan Museeuw
Giro della Provincia di Lucca, Paolo Bettini
Overall Tour de Langkawi, Paolo Lanfranchi
Stage 4 Volta a la Comunidad Valenciana, Michele Bartoli
Stage 5a Volta a la Comunidad Valenciana, Stefano Zanini
Stage 1 Vuelta Ciclista a Murcia, Davide Bramati
Stage 1 Guldensporentweedaagse, Wilfried Pieters
Overall Tirreno–Adriatico, Michele Bartoli

Stage 4, Paolo Bettini

Stage 8 Paris–Nice, Tom Steels
Dwars door Vlaanderen, Johan Museeuw
Stage 4 Setmana Catalana de Ciclisme, Giuliano Figueras
Brabantse Pijl, Johan Museeuw
Stage 1 KBC Driedaagse van De Panne – Koksijde, Tom Steels
GP de la Ville de Rennes, Max van Heeswijk
Stage 2 Vuelta Ciclista al País Vasco, Giuliano Figueras
Gent–Wevelgem, Tom Steels
Paris–Roubaix, Andrea Tafi
La Flèche Wallonne, Michele Bartoli
Overall Giro di Toscana, Luca Scinto
Stage 1 Tour de Romandie, Giuliano Figueras
Stages 2, 3 & 17 Tour de France, Tom Steels
Memorial Rik Van Steenbergen, Giuliano Figueras
Stage 11 Vuelta a España, Daniele Nardello
Paris–Bourges, Daniele Nardello
Giro del Piemonte, Andrea Tafi

== 2000 Mapei–Quick Step ==
Overall Tour de Wallonie, Axel Merckx
Criterium Aalst, Axel Merckx
Trofeo Manacor, Paolo Bettini
Gran Premio di Chiasso, Giuliano Figueras
Trofeo Palma de Mallorca, Óscar Freire
Stage 4 Tour Méditerranéen, Tom Steels
Trofeo Laigueglia, Daniele Nardello
Stage 2 Vuelta a Andalucia – Ruta Ciclista Del Sol, Michele Bartoli
Overall Tour du Haut Var, Daniele Nardello
Stage 3 Volta a la Comunidad Valenciana, Óscar Freire
Omloop Het Volk, Johan Museeuw
Stages 1 & 6 Tirreno–Adriatico, Óscar Freire
Brabantse Pijl, Johan Museeuw
Stage 2 KBC Driedaagse van De Panne – Koksijde, Tom Steels
Stage 3 Vuelta al País Vasco, Stefano Zanini
Paris–Roubaix, Johan Museeuw
Liège–Bastogne–Liège, Paolo Bettini
Stage 5 Four Days of Dunkirk, Fred Rodriguez
Stage 4 Tour de Romandie, Andrea Noè
Prologue Tour of Slovenia, László Bodrogi
Stage 2 Tour of Slovenia, Dario Cioni
Stage 8 Giro d'Italia, Axel Merckx
Stage 19 Giro d'Italia, Paolo Lanfranchi
Stage 2 Tour de Suisse, Fred Rodriguez
Stage 10 Tour de Suisse, Stefano Zanini
Italy National Road Race championships, Michele Bartoli
Hungary National Road Race championships, László Bodrogi
Belgium National Road Race championships, Axel Merckx
United States National Road Race championships, Fred Rodriguez
Hungary National Time Trial championships, László Bodrogi
Stage 2 & 3 Tour de France, Tom Steels
Stage 9 Tour de France, Paolo Bettini
Stage 21 Tour de France, Stefano Zanini
GP Ouest France – Plouay, Michele Bartoli
Stage 5 Ronde van Nederland, Max van Heeswijk
Stages 2 & 4 Vuelta a España, Óscar Freire
Stage 17 Vuelta a España, Davide Bramati
Paris–Bruxelles, Max van Heeswijk
Circuit Franco-Belge, Daniele Nardello
Paris–Tours, Andrea Tafi

== 2001 Mapei–Quick Step ==
Coppa Placci, Paolo Bettini
Volta ao Alentejo, László Bodrogi
GP de Waregem, Stijn Devolder
Overall Tour de Langkawi, Paolo Lanfranchi

Prologue, Stages 8 & 9, Paolo Lanfranchi
Stages 3 & 11, Paolo Bettini

Tour du Haut Var, Daniele Nardello
Omloop Het Volk, Michele Bartoli
GP Città di Lugano, Luca Paolini
Vlaamse Pijl, Stijn Devolder
Stage 2 Vuelta Ciclista al País Vasco, Stefano Zanini
Stage 5a Vuelta Ciclista al País Vasco, Stefano Garzelli
Stage 2 Internationale Niedersachsen-Rundfahrt, Pedro Horrillo
Stage 1 Tour of Slovenia, Stefano Zanini
Stage 7 Giro d'Italia, Stefano Zanini
Stage 1 Deutschland Tour, Tom Steels
Stage 4 Deutschland Tour, Óscar Freire
Stages 1b & 2 Tour of Sweden, Tom Steels
Stage 4 Tour of Sweden, László Bodrogi
Stage 7 Tour de Suisse, Stefano Garzelli
Italy National Road Race championships, Daniele Nardello
Hungary National Time Trial championships, László Bodrogi
Gran Premio Città di Camaiore, Michele Bartoli
Stage 2 Tour de l'Ain, Evgeni Petrov
Züri-Metzgete, Paolo Bettini
World Road Race championships, Óscar Freire

== 2002 Mapei–Quick Step ==
Criterium Bavikhoeve, Paolo Bettini
Roma Maxima, Paolo Bettini
Trofeo Manacor, Óscar Freire
Omloop van het Houtland Lichtervelde, Kevin Hulsman
Grand Prix Eddy Merckx, László Bodrogi
Giro del Piemonte, Luca Paolini
Stage 5 Tour Down Under, Cadel Evans
Stages 1, 2 & 5 Tour de Langkawi, Robbie Hunter
Prologue Paris–Nice, László Bodrogi
Stage 2 Tirreno–Adriatico, Paolo Bettini
Overall GP Erik Breukink, Fabian Cancellara

Stage 4, Fabian Cancellara

Brabantse Pijl, Fabian De Waele
Stage 1 KBC Driedaagse van De Panne – Koksijde, Stefano Zanini
Tour of Flanders, Andrea Tafi
GP Industria & Artigianato di Larciano
Stage 6 Four Days of Dunkirk, Tom Steels
ZLM Tour, Fabian Cancellara
Liège–Bastogne–Liège, Paolo Bettini
Stages 2 & 5 Giro d'Italia, Stefano Garzelli
Stage 1 Euskal Bizikleta, Pedro Horrillo
Stage 1a Tour of Austria, Fabian Cancellara
Stage 6 Volta Ciclista a Catalunya, Tom Steels
Belgium National Road Race championships, Tom Steels
Hungary National Time Trial championships, László Bodrogi
Stage 6 Volta Ciclista a Catalunya, Tom Steels
Stage 2 Tour de France, Óscar Freire
Stage 1 Tour de Wallonie, Óscar Freire
Stage 2b Rothaus Regio-Tour International, Paolo Bettini
Stage 4a Tour of Denmark, Elio Aggiano
Stage 4b Tour of Denmark, László Bodrogi
Tre Valli Varesine, Eddy Ratti
Coppa Bernocchi, Daniele Nardello
Stage 5 Tour du Poitou Charentes et de la Vienne, Elio Aggiano
Stages 1 & 2 Tour de Pologne, Robbie Hunter
Stage 1 Circuit Franco-Belge, Kevin Hulsmans
Switzerland National Time Trial championships, Fabian Cancellara
UCI Road World Cup, Paolo Bettini

== Supplementary statistics ==
Grand Tours by highest finishing position
Race	1993	1994	1995	1996	1997	1998	1999	2000	2001	2002
Giro d'Italia	–	45	1	3	2	2	17	4	6	14
Tour de France	–	12	7	9	12	8	7	10	14	44
Vuelta a España	–	1	2	3	9	16	4	3	19	55
Major week-long stage races by highest finishing position
Race	1993	1994	1995	1996	1997	1998	1999	2000	2001	2002
Tour Down Under	Did not Exist						–	–	4	4
Paris–Nice	–	1	4	4	8	1	12	29	10	10
Tirreno–Adriatico	15	9	35	13	2	2	1	13	22	3
Volta a Catalunya	–	2	6	–	5	20	20	9	–	57
Tour of the Basque Country	–	1	3	3	9	69	17	15	11	6
Giro del Trentino	9	13	13	13	2	11	–	5	5	5
Tour de Romandie	–	4	1	1	1	9	6	4	11	3
Critérium du Dauphiné	–	–	–	2	–	–	–	–	–	–
Tour de Suisse	–	35	10	14	2	DNF	10	7	8	23
Tour de Pologne	–	–	–	3	2	7	39	–	16	30
Eneco Tour	–	–	–	12	6	–	4	15	21	4
Monument races by highest finishing position
Race	1993	1994	1995	1996	1997	1998	1999	2000	2001	2002
Milan–San Remo	2	15	12	8	30	4	44	3	5	5
Tour of Flanders	–	4	1	3	3	1	3	21	5	1
Paris–Roubaix	–	3	1	1	3	1	1	1	27	17
Liège–Bastogne–Liège	–	5	13	12	6	6	4	1	15	1
Giro di Lombardia	23	47	2	1	2	1	9	5	5	21
Classics by highest finishing position
Classic	1993	1994	1995	1996	1997	1998	1999	2000	2001	2002
Omloop Het Nieuwsblad	–	–	1	1	2	5	2	1	1	5
Kuurne–Brussels–Kuurne	–	–	7	6	1	2	2	10	7	11
E3 Prijs Vlaanderen	–	5	1	1	6	1	4	10	15	4
Gent–Wevelgem	–	2	14	1	9	1	1	3	8	6
Amstel Gold Race	–	16	7	3	2	18	9	9	7	5
La Flèche Wallonne	–	10	70	11	25	2	1	10	11	4
Clásica de San Sebastián	–	3	2	11	13	4	3	4	6	7
Paris–Tours	–	2	7	2	5	4	2	1	2	11
