= List of wins by Gaseosas Glacial–Selle Italia and its successors =

This is a list of victories of the GW Erco SportFitness cycling team. The races are categorized according to the UCI Continental Circuits rules.

== 2000 – Aguardiente Néctar–Selle Italia ==
Stage 10 Vuelta al Táchira, Rubén Marín
Stage 11 Vuelta al Táchira, Jairo Pérez
Stage 2 Tour de Langkawi, Jamie Drew
Stage 4 Vuelta Ciclista de Chile, Israel Ochoa
Tour du Lac Léman, Andris Naudužs
Stages 1, 2, 3 & 4 Vuelta a Colombia, Andris Naudužs
Stages 6 & 15 Vuelta a Colombia, Raúl Montaña
Stages 9 & 14 Vuelta a Colombia, Jairo Pérez
Stage 13 Vuelta a Colombia, Rubén Marín
Prologue (ITT) Clásico RCN, Libardo Niño
Stage 7 Clásico RCN, Elkin Barrera
Overall Tour du Faso, Mikhaylo Khalilov

Stages 1 & 4, Dimitri Pavi Degl'Innocenti
Stages 2, 3, 8, 10 & 11, Mikhaylo Khalilov
Stage 5, Csaba Szekeres
Stage 6a, Guido Trombetta
Stage 7a, Team time trial

Colombia Time Trial Championships, Israel Ochoa

== 2001 – Selle Italia–Pacific ==
Stausee-Rundfahrt Klingnau, Andris Naudužs
Stage 2 Tour du Maroc, Jhon García
Stage 14 Giro d'Italia, Carlos Alberto Contreras
Overall Vuelta a Colombia, Hernán Buenahora

Stages 7, 8, 10 & 16, Hernán Buenahora

Stages 2 & 7 Clásico RCN, José Castelblanco
Stage 8 Clásico RCN, Fredy González
Trofeo dello Scalatore III, Fredy González
Australia Time Trial Championships, Kristjan Snorrasson
Overall Perlis Open, Kristjan Snorrasson

Stages 1 & 2, Kristjan Snorrasson

== 2002 – Colombia–Selle Italia ==
Stage 5 Vuelta al Táchira, Carlos Ibáñez
Stage 10 Vuelta al Táchira, Fidel Chacón
Overall Tour de Langkawi, Hernán Darío Muñoz

Stage 9, Hernán Darío Muñoz

Colombia Road Race Championships, Jhon García
Overall Vuelta a Colombia, José Castelblanco

Stages 5 & 10, José Castelblanco
Stage 12, Hernán Darío Muñoz
Stage 14, Jhon García

Overall Clásico RCN, José Castelblanco

Stages 2 & 6, Fredy González
Stage 5, Fidel Chacón
Stage 8, José Castelblanco

Stages 2 & 4 Tour of Bulgaria, Andris Naudužs
Stage 6 Tour of Bulgaria, Mikhaylo Khalilov
Stage 7 Tour of Bulgaria, Denis Sosnovtchenko
Overall Tour du Sénégal, Andris Naudužs

Prologue (ITT) & Stage 5, Fidel Chacón
Stages 1 & 10, Andris Naudužs
Stages 2 & 7, Leonardo Scarselli
Stages 3 & 8, Denis Sosnovtchenko
Stage 4, Vladimir Lobzov

== 2003 – Colombia–Selle Italia ==
Overall Vuelta al Táchira, Hernán Darío Muñoz

Stage 6, Rubén Marín
Stages 8 & 13, Hernán Darío Muñoz

Stage 9 Tour de Langkawi, Hernán Darío Muñoz
Gp Knorr, Raffaele Illiano
Stage 13 Vuelta a Colombia, Huberlino Mesa
Overall Clásico RCN, José Castelblanco

Stage 4, José Rujano
Stage 7, José Castelblanco

== 2004 – Colombia–Selle Italia ==
Overall Vuelta al Táchira, José Rujano

Stages 1, 3 & 14, Marlon Pérez
Stages 5 & 13, José Rujano
Stage 8 & 12, Fredy González

Overall Tour de Langkawi, Fredy González

Stage 2, Marlon Pérez
Stage 9, Rubén Marín

Grand Prix Bradlo, Raffaele Illiano
Stage 8 Vuelta a Venezuela, Fredy González
Overall Tour du Sénégal, Mariano Giallorenzo

Prologue (ITT), Stages 6 & 8, Raffaele Illiano
Stages 2, 5 & 7, Denis Sosnovtchenko

== 2005 – Colombia–Selle Italia ==
Overall Vuelta al Táchira, José Rujano

Stages 6, 7 & 13, José Rujano

Colombia Time Trial Championships, Iván Parra
Stages 13 & 14 Giro d'Italia, Iván Parra
Stage 19 Giro d'Italia, José Rujano
Mountains classification in the Giro d'Italia, José Rujano
Stage 2 Vuelta a Colombia, Nilton Ortíz
Stages 1 & 7 Vuelta a Venezuela, Moreno Di Biase
Stage 2 Vuelta a Venezuela, Jesús Pérez
Stages 4 & 10a Vuelta a Venezuela, Marlon Pérez
Overall Clásico Ciclistico Banfoandes, José Rujano

Stages 4, 7 & 8, José Rujano

== 2006 – Selle Italia–Serramenti Diquigiovanni ==
Stages 4 & 5 Tour de Langkawi, José Serpa
Prologue (ITT) Vuelta por un Chile Lider, Edgardo Simón
Stages 4, 7, 8a & 10, Vuelta por un Chile Lider, Alberto Loddo
Stage 6 Vuelta por un Chile Lider, José Serpa
Stage 4 Circuit de la Sarthe, Alberto Loddo
Stage 5 Circuit de la Sarthe, Alessandro Bertolini
Stage 7 Vuelta a Colombia, Walter Pedraza
Stage 12 Vuelta a Colombia, José Serpa
Overall Vuelta a Venezuela, José Serpa

Stage 4, José Serpa

Coppa Ugo Agostoni, Alessandro Bertolini
Giro della Romagna, Santo Anzà

== 2007 – Serramenti PVC Diquigiovanni–Selle Italia ==
Stage 1 Vuelta al Táchira, Alberto Loddo
Stage 5 Vuelta al Táchira, José Serpa
Stage 10 Vuelta al Táchira, Walter Pedraza
Stages 1, 4, 5, 6 & 10, Tour de Langkawi, Alberto Loddo
Stage 8 Tour de Langkawi, José Serpa
Prologue (ITT) & Stages 4, 5 & 6 Vuelta por un Chile Lider, Edgardo Simón
Stage 9 Vuelta por un Chile Lider, Walter Pedraza
Stage 10 Vuelta por un Chile Lider, Anthony Brea
Stage 1a Settimana Internazionale di Coppi e Bartali, Alessandro Bertolini
Stage 1 Vuelta a La Rioja, Alberto Loddo
Stage 2 Vuelta a Asturias, Alberto Loddo
Overall Tour of Qinghai Lake, Gabriele Missaglia
Giro dell'Appennino, Alessandro Bertolini
Coppa Ugo Agostoni, Alessandro Bertolini
Trofeo Melinda, Santo Anzà
Giro del Veneto, Alessandro Bertolini
Coppa Placci, Alessandro Bertolini
Stage 6 Vuelta a Venezuela, Emiliano Donadello

== 2008 – Serramenti PVC Diquigiovanni–Androni Giocattoli ==
Stage 4 Tour de San Luis, Carlos José Ochoa
Overall Tour de Langkawi, Ruslan Ivanov

Stage 4, Danilo Hondo
Stage 6, José Serpa

Stage 2 Tirreno–Adriatico, Raffaele Illiano
Stage 2 Settimana Internazionale di Coppi e Bartali, Niklas Axelsson
Stage 1 Volta ao Alentejo, Jackson Rodríguez
Stage 11 Giro d'Italia, Alessandro Bertolini
Overall Brixia Tour, Santo Anzà

Stage 4, Santo Anzà

Gran Premio Industria e Commercio Artigianato Carnaghese, Francesco Ginanni
Giro dell'Appennino, Alessandro Bertolini
Tre Valli Varesine, Francesco Ginanni
Overall Vuelta a Venezuela, Carlos José Ochoa

Stage 2, Jackson Rodríguez
Stage 5, Carlos José Ochoa
Stage 7, Richard Ochoa
Stage 9, José Serpa

Overall Clasico Ciclistico Banfoandes, José Serpa

Stage 1, Manuel Belletti
Stages 6 & 7, José Serpa

== 2009 – Serramenti PVC Diquigiovanni–Androni Giocattoli ==
Stage 1 Tour de San Luis, Mattia Gavazzi
Stage 4 Tour de San Luis, José Serpa
Overall Tour de Langkawi, José Serpa

Stages 1, 2, 3 & 6, Mattia Gavazzi
Stage 5, José Serpa

Stages 3 & 4 Vuelta a Andalucía, Davide Rebellin
Trofeo Laigueglia, Francesco Ginanni
Gran Premio dell'Insubria-Lugano, Francesco Ginanni
Overall Vuelta Mexico Telmex, Jackson Rodríguez

Stage 2, Jackson Rodríguez
Stage 3, Gilberto Simoni

Overall Tirreno–Adriatico, Michele Scarponi

Stage 6, Michele Scarponi

Stage 3 Settimana Ciclistica Lombarda, Mattia Gavazzi
La Flèche Wallonne, Davide Rebellin
Stages 6 & 18 Giro d'Italia, Michele Scarponi
Stages 1 & 2 Vuelta a Venezuela, Alberto Loddo
Stages 3a, 3b & 4 Vuelta a Venezuela, Mattia Gavazzi
Stage 7 Vuelta a Venezuela, José Serpa
Switzerland Time Trial Championship, Rubens Bertogliati
Stagse 1a & 5 Brixia Tour, Mattia Gavazzi
Stage 2 Brixia Tour, Leonardo Bertagnolli
Gran Premio Industria e Commercio Artigianato Carnaghese, Francesco Ginanni

== 2010 – Androni Giocattoli ==
Stages 3 & 7 Tour de San Luis, Alberto Loddo
Stage 5 Tour de San Luis, Jackson Rodríguez
Stage 6 Tour de San Luis, Luis Ángel Maté
Trofeo Laigueglia, Francesco Ginanni
Stage 5 Giro di Sardegna, Alberto Loddo
Stage 4 Tirreno–Adriatico, Michele Scarponi
Stage 2 Settimana Internazionale di Coppi e Bartali, José Serpa
Overall Settimana Ciclistica Lombarda, Michele Scarponi

Prologue (ITT), Michele Scarponi
Stage 4, José Serpa

Stage 3 Giro del Trentino, Alessandro Bertolini
Stage 19 Giro d'Italia, Michele Scarponi
Switzerland Time Trial Championship, Rubens Bertogliati
Stage 3 Tour of Austria, Leonardo Bertagnolli

== 2011 – Androni Giocattoli ==
Stages 1 & 3 Tour de San Luis, Roberto Ferrari
Stage 2 Tour de San Luis, José Serpa
Overall Tour de Langkawi, Jonathan Monsalve

Stage 5, Jonathan Monsalve

Giro del Friuli, José Serpa
Overall Settimana Internazionale di Coppi e Bartali, Emanuele Sella

Stage 1b, Team time trial
Stage 3, Emanuele Sella

GP Industria & Artigianato di Larciano
Stage 3 Giro d'Italia, Ángel Vicioso
Stages 9 & 13 Giro d'Italia, José Rujano

== 2012 – Androni Giocattoli–Venezuela ==
Italy Road Race Championships, Franco Pellizotti
Venezuela Road Race Championships, Miguel Ubeto
Venezuela Time Trial Championships, Tomás Gil
Overall Tour de Langkawi, José Serpa

Stages 5 & 6, José Serpa

Stage 5 Tour de Taiwan, Roberto Ferrari
Route Adélie, Roberto Ferrari
Flèche d'Emeraude, Roberto Ferrari
Giro dell'Appennino, Fabio Felline
Stage 6 Giro d'Italia, Miguel Ángel Rubiano
Stage 11 Giro d'Italia, Roberto Ferrari
Overall Vuelta a Venezuela, Miguel Ubeto

Stage 5, Jackson Rodríguez

Coppa Ugo Agostoni, Emanuele Sella
Memorial Marco Pantani, Fabio Felline
Gran Premio Industria e Commercio di Prato, Emanuele Sella

== 2013 – Androni Giocattoli–Venezuela ==
Stage 7 Tour de San Luis, Mattia Gavazzi
Stage 1a Settimana Internazionale di Coppi e Bartali, Fabio Felline
Route Adélie, Alessandro Malaguti
Giro di Toscana, Mattia Gavazzi
Stage 2 Tour of Slovenia, Fabio Felline
Stage 4 Route du Sud, Marco Frapporti
Stage 8 Tour of Austria, Omar Bertazzo
Stage 3b Sibiu Cycling Tour, Mattia Gavazzi
Overall Vuelta a Venezuela, Carlos José Ochoa

Stage 3, Mattia Gavazzi
Stages 6 & 9, Jackson Rodríguez

Gran Premio Industria e Commercio di Prato, Gianfranco Zilioli

== 2014 – Androni Giocattoli–Venezuela ==
Stage 6 Tour de Langkawi, Kenny van Hummel
Stage 1 Tour d'Azerbaïdjan, Kenny van Hummel
Venezuela Under-23 National Time Trial Championships, Yonder Godoy
Stage 6 Vuelta a Venezuela, Carlos Gálviz
Stage 10 Vuelta a Venezuela, Kenny van Hummel
Stage 4 Tour du Limousin, Manuel Belletti

== 2015 – Androni–Sidermec ==
Stage 5 Vuelta al Táchira, Carlos Gálviz
Stage 3 Settimana Internazionale di Coppi e Bartali, Francesco Chicchi
Stage 6 Vuelta a Venezuela, Francesco Chicchi
Venezuela National Time Trial Championships, Yonder Godoy
Romania National Time Trial Championships, Serghei Țvetcov
Romania National Road Race Championships, Serghei Țvetcov
Stages 1 & 4 Sibiu Cycling Tour, Oscar Gatto
Stage 3 Sibiu Cycling Tour, Alessio Taliani
Stage 3a (ITT) Tour of Szeklerland, Serghei Țvetcov

== 2016 – Androni Giocattoli–Sidermec ==
Overall Tour of Bihor, Egan Bernal

Stage 1, Egan Bernal
Stages 2 & 3, Marco Benfatto

Stage 1 Boucles de la Mayenne, Francesco Chicchi
Stage 4 Sibiu Cycling Tour, Davide Viganò
Stage 2 Volta a Portugal, Francesco Gavazzi
Overall Tour of China I, Raffaello Bonusi

Stages 1, 2 & 6, Marco Benfatto
Stage 3, Raffaello Bonusi
Stage 4, Mattia De Marchi

Memorial Marco Pantani, Francesco Gavazzi
Overall Tour of China II, Marco Benfatto

Stages 1, 4 & 5, Marco Benfatto

== 2017 – Androni–Sidermec–Bottecchia ==
Stage 1 Vuelta al Táchira, Raffaello Bonusi
Stage 3 Tour de la Provence, Mattia Cattaneo
Stage 7 Tour de Bretagne, Andrea Vendrame
Stage 1 Tour du Jura, Marco Frapporti
Overall Tour of Bihor, Rodolfo Torres

Stages 1 & 3, Matteo Malucelli
Stage 2a, Rodolfo Torres

Stage 2 Tour de Slovaquie, Matteo Malucelli
Overall Tour de Savoie Mont-Blanc, Egan Bernal

Stages 2 & 4 (ITT), Egan Bernal

Overall Sibiu Cycling Tour, Egan Bernal

Prologue, Andrea Palini
Stages 2 & 3, Egan Bernal

Stage 1 Tour of China I, Luca Pacioni
Stage 5 Tour of China I, Marco Benfatto
Overall Tour of China II, Kevin Rivera

Stage 1 Tour of China II, Kevin Rivera

== 2018 – Androni–Sidermec–Bottecchia ==
Stages 1 & 3 Vuelta al Táchira, Matteo Malucelli
Stage 4 Vuelta al Táchira, Iván Sosa
Stage 7 Vuelta al Táchira, Kevin Rivera
Stage 7 Tour de Langkawi, Manuel Belletti
Stage 2 Tour de Bretagne, Matteo Malucelli
Stage 2 Vuelta a Aragón, Matteo Malucelli
Overall Tour of Bihor, Iván Sosa

Stage 1, Matteo Malucelli
Stage 2a, Iván Sosa

Overall Adriatica Ionica Race, Iván Sosa

Stage 3, Iván Sosa

Overall Sibiu Cycling Tour, Iván Sosa

Prologue, Davide Ballerini
Stage 1, Iván Sosa

Overall Vuelta Ciclista a Venezuela, Matteo Spreafico

Stage 1, Matteo Malucelli
Stage 4, Marco Benfatto
Stage 5 (ITT), Matteo Spreafico

Overall Vuelta a Burgos, Iván Sosa

Stage 5, Iván Sosa

Overall Tour de Hongrie, Manuel Belletti

Stage 1, Manuel Belletti

Stage 1 Tour of China I, Matteo Malucelli
Stages 3 & 5 Tour of China I, Marco Benfatto
Stage 3 Tour of China II, Seid Lizde
Memorial Marco Pantani, Davide Ballerini
Trofeo Matteotti, Davide Ballerini
Overall Tour of Hainan, Fausto Masnada

Stages 3, 5 & 7, Manuel Belletti
Stage 8, Fausto Masnada

Tour de Langkawi

Stage 5 & 6, Matteo Pelucchi
Stage 8, Marco Benfatto

== 2019 – Androni Giocattoli–Sidermec ==
Stage 1 Vuelta al Táchira, Marco Benfatto
Stage 8 Vuelta al Táchira, Miguel Flórez
Stage 2 Giro di Sicilia, Manuel Belletti
Stages 5, 6 & 8 Tour de Langkawi, Matteo Pelucchi
Stage 4 Circuit Cycliste Sarthe–Pays de la Loire, Andrea Vendrame
Tro-Bro Léon, Andrea Vendrame
Stages 3 & 5 Tour of the Alps, Fausto Masnada
Stage 1 Tour de Bretagne, Manuel Belletti
Giro dell'Appennino, Mattia Cattaneo
Stage 6 Giro d'Italia, Fausto Masnada
Stage 3 Vuelta a Aragón, Matteo Pelucchi
Overall Cycling Tour of Bihor, Daniel Muñoz

Stage 2b, Daniel Muñoz

Croatia National Time Trial Championships, Josip Rumac
Croatia National Road Race Championships, Josip Rumac
Stage 1 Tour de Hongrie, Manuel Belletti
Overall Sibiu Cycling Tour, Kevin Rivera

Stage 2, Kevin Rivera

Stage 4 Tour du Limousin, Francesco Gavazzi
Stage 3 Tour Poitou-Charentes en Nouvelle Aquitaine, Matteo Pelucchi
Stage 1 & 5 Tour of China I, Marco Benfatto
Stage 1 & 2 Tour of China II, Marco Benfatto
Stage 3 Tour of China II, Kevin Rivera
Stages 1 & 6 Tour of Taihu Lake, Marco Benfatto
Stages 2 & 4 Tour of Taihu Lake, Matteo Pelucchi

== 2020 – Androni Giocattoli–Sidermec ==
Stage 1 Vuelta al Táchira, Luca Pacioni
Stages 3 & 5 Vuelta al Táchira, Jhonatan Restrepo
Stages 6 (ITT) & 7 Vuelta al Táchira, Kevin Rivera
Stage 5 Vuelta a San Juan, Miguel Flórez
Stage 4 Tour de Langkawi, Kevin Rivera
Stages 3, 5, 6 & 7 (ITT) Tour of Rwanda, Jhonatan Restrepo
Croatia National Time Trial Championships, Josip Rumac
Croatia National Road Race Championships, Josip Rumac

== 2021 – Androni Giocattoli–Sidermec ==
Stage 1 Vuelta al Táchira, Matteo Malucelli
Stage 8 Vuelta al Táchira, Simon Pellaud
Stage 7 (ITT) Tour du Rwanda, Jhonatan Restrepo
Ecuador National Road Race Championships, Jefferson Alexander Cepeda
Ukraine National Road Race Championships, Andrii Ponomar
Stage 3 Tour Alsace, Santiago Umba
Overall Tour de Savoie Mont-Blanc, Jefferson Alexander Cepeda

Stage 1, Santiago Umba
Stage 2, Jefferson Alexander Cepeda

Prologue Tour of Romania, János Pelikán
Stage 3 Tour of Romania, Daniel Muñoz
Stage 5 Tour de Bretagne, Leonardo Marchiori

== 2022 – Drone Hopper–Androni Giocattoli ==
Stage 8 Vuelta al Táchira, Didier Merchán
Overall Tour du Rwanda, Natnael Tesfatsion

Stage 3, Jhonatan Restrepo

Stage 4 Tour of Turkey, Eduardo Sepúlveda
Stage 2 Adriatica Ionica Race, Natnael Tesfatsion
Stage 3 Tour of Romania, Eduard-Michael Grosu

== 2023 – GW Shimano–Sidermec ==
Stage 3 Vuelta al Táchira, Jonathan Guatibonza
Colombia U23 Time Trial Championships, Germán Dário Gómez
Giro della Città Metropolitana di Reggio Calabria, Jhonatan Restrepo
Stage 2 Vuelta a Colombia, Jonathan Guatibonza

== 2024 – GW Erco Shimano ==
Stage 8 Vuelta al Táchira, Alejandro Osorio
Colombia U23 Road Race Championships, Brandon Rojas
Colombia Road Race Championships, Alejandro Osorio
Stage 3 Tour Colombia, Alejandro Osorio
Stage 5 Vuelta Bantrab, Fabian Lopez
Stages 1 & 7 Vuelta a Colombia, Adrián Bustamante
Stages 2, 3 & 5 Vuelta a Colombia, Alejandro Osorio
Stage 2 Vuelta a Guatemala, Fabian Lopez

== Supplementary statistics ==
=== 1996 to 2016 ===
Grand Tours by highest finishing position
Race	1996	1997	1998	1999	2000	2001	2002	2003	2004	2005	2006	2007	2008	2009	2010	2011	2012	2013	2014	2015	2016
Giro d'Italia	DNF	50	–	–	6	8	27	34	35	3	31	–	10	9	4	6	45	10	12	24	–
Tour de France	–	–	–	–	–	–	–	–	–	–	–	–	–	–	–	–	–	–	–	–	–
/ Vuelta a España	–	–	–	–	–	–	–	–	–	–	–	–	–	–	–	–	–	–	–	–	–
Major week-long stage races by highest finishing position
Race	1996	1997	1998	1999	2000	2001	2002	2003	2004	2005	2006	2007	2008	2009	2010	2011	2012	2013	2014	2015	2016
Tour Down Under	Did not Exist			–	–	–	–	–	–	–	–	–	–	–	–	–	–	–	–	–	–
/ Paris–Nice	–	–	–	–	–	–	–	–	–	–	–	–	–	–	–	–	–	–	–	–	–
/ Tirreno–Adriatico	–	–	12	16	–	–	–	–	–	–	–	–	5	1	2	–	–	–	–	–	44
Volta a Catalunya	–	–	–	–	–	–	–	–	–	–	–	–	–	–	–	–	–	–	–	–	–
Tour of the Basque Country	–	–	–	–	–	–	–	–	–	–	–	–	–	–	–	–	–	–	–	–	–
Tour de Romandie	–	–	–	–	–	–	–	–	–	–	–	–	–	–	–	–	–	–	–	–	–
Critérium du Dauphiné	–	–	–	–	–	–	–	–	–	–	–	–	–	–	–	–	–	–	–	–	–
Tour de Suisse	–	–	–	–	–	–	–	–	–	–	–	–	–	–	–	–	–	–	–	–	–
Tour de Pologne	11	–	–	–	–	–	–	–	–	–	–	–	–	–	–	–	–	–	–	–	–
/ Eneco Tour	–	–	–	–	–	–	–	–	–	–	–	–	–	–	–	–	–	–	–	–	–
Monument races by highest finishing position
Race	1996	1997	1998	1999	2000	2001	2002	2003	2004	2005	2006	2007	2008	2009	2010	2011	2012	2013	2014	2015	2016
Milan–San Remo	–	–	–	–	–	–	–	–	–	–	–	–	11	38	7	19	–	55	63	43	20
Tour of Flanders	–	–	–	–	–	–	–	–	–	–	–	–	–	–	–	–	–	–	87	47	–
Paris–Roubaix	–	–	–	–	–	–	–	–	–	–	–	–	–	–	DNF	–	–	–	–	–	–
Liège–Bastogne–Liège	–	–	–	–	–	–	–	–	–	–	–	–	–	3	77	–	–	–	–	–	–
Giro di Lombardia	–	–	–	–	–	53	–	–	–	–	25	16	23	86	2	10	12	8	38	49	13
Classics by highest finishing position
Classic	1996	1997	1998	1999	2000	2001	2002	2003	2004	2005	2006	2007	2008	2009	2010	2011	2012	2013	2014	2015	2016
Omloop Het Nieuwsblad	–	–	–	–	–	–	–	–	NH	–	–	–	–	–	–	–	–	–	89	40	–
Kuurne–Brussels–Kuurne	–	–	–	–	–	–	–	–	–	–	–	–	–	–	–	–	–	NH	41	–	–
Strade Bianche	Did not Exist											23	7	19	6	6	–	24	19	6	39
E3 Harelbeke	–	–	–	–	–	–	–	–	–	–	–	–	–	–	–	–	–	–	46	23	–
Gent–Wevelgem	–	–	–	–	–	–	–	–	–	–	–	–	–	–	–	–	–	–	62	–	–
Amstel Gold Race	–	–	–	–	–	–	–	–	–	–	–	–	–	17	–	–	–	–	85	–	–
La Flèche Wallonne	–	–	–	–	–	–	–	–	–	–	–	–	–	1	127	–	–	–	–	–	–
Clásica de San Sebastián	–	–	–	–	–	–	–	–	–	–	–	–	–	–	–	–	–	–	–	–	–
Paris–Tours	–	–	–	–	–	–	–	–	–	–	–	–	–	–	–	–	–	–	–	–	–

=== 2017 to present ===
Grand Tours by highest finishing position
Race	2017	2018	2019	2020	2021	2022
Giro d'Italia	–	26	20	71	47	76
Tour de France	–	–	–	–	–	–
Vuelta a España	–	–	–	–	–	–
Major week-long stage races by highest finishing position
Race	2017	2018	2019	2020	2021	2022
Tour Down Under	–	–	–	–	NH	
Paris–Nice	–	–	–	–	–	–
Tirreno–Adriatico	16	–	–	53	36	26
Volta a Catalunya	–	–	–	NH	–	–
Tour of the Basque Country	–	–	–	NH	–	–
/ Tour de Romandie	–	–	–	NH	–	–
Critérium du Dauphiné	–	–	–	–	–	–
Tour de Suisse	–	–	–	NH	–	–
Tour de Pologne	–	–	–	–	–	–
BinckBank Tour	–	–	–	–	–	NH (Note: The Organisers cancelled the 2022 edition due to an "overcrowded" calendar.)
Monuments by highest finishing position
Monument	2017	2018	2019	2020	2021	2022
Milan–San Remo	15	–	33	84	60	59
Tour of Flanders	–	–	–	–	–	–
Paris–Roubaix	–	–	–	NH	–	–
Liège–Bastogne–Liège	–	–	–	–	–	–
Il Lombardia	13	19	88	36	66	86
Classics by highest finishing position
Classic	2017	2018	2019	2020	2021	2022
Omloop Het Nieuwsblad	–	–	–	–	–	–
Kuurne–Brussels–Kuurne	–	–	–	–	–	–
Strade Bianche	65	DNF	–	26	78	62
E3 Harelbeke	–	–	–	NH	–	–
Gent–Wevelgem	–	–	–	–	–	–
Amstel Gold Race	–	–	–	NH	–	–
La Flèche Wallonne	–	–	–	–	–	–
Clásica de San Sebastián	–	–	–	NH	–	–
Paris–Tours	–	–	–	–	–	

Legend
—	Did not compete
DNF	Did not finish
NH	Not held
