= Mercatone Uno–Scanavino =

Mercatone Uno-Scanavino
Team information
- UCI code: MER
- Registered: San Marino 1992–1995; Italy 1997–2003
- Founded: 1992
- Disbanded: 2003
- Discipline: Road

Key personnel
- General manager: Franco Gini (1992–1995); Luciano Pezzi (1997–1998); Franco Cornacchia (1995–2001); Manuela Ronchi (2000–2002)

Team name history
- 1992–1993 1994 1995 1997 1998–1999 2000 2001 2002 2003: Mercatone Uno-Zucchini; Mercatone Uno-Medeghini; Mercatone Uno-Saeco; Mercatone Uno; Mercatone Uno-Bianchi; Mercatone Uno-Albacom; Mercatone Uno-Stream TV; Mercatone Uno; Mercatone Uno-Scanavino

Mercatone Uno–Scanavino is a former professional cycling team which was based in San Marino and then in Italy. Throughout the 1990s it was one of the strongest Italian cycling teams in the peloton. The team was sponsored by a chain of supermarkets in Italy.

== History ==
=== San Marino Team ===
The team began as Mercatone Uno-Zucchini in 1992 and was based in San Marino. Riding with the team Adriano Baffi won the points classification in the 1993 Giro d'Italia. During the 1995 season the General Manager of the team was Franco Gini and the directeur sportifs were Antonio Salutini, Franco Chioccioli, Olivano Locatelli and Bruno Vicino. This team closed the 1995 season with the withdrawal of the sponsor: the new team had the same sponsor but was a totally different team.

=== Team built around Pantani ===
When Carrera Jeans manufacturers stopped sponsoring the famous Italian cycling team Carrera Jeans–Tassoni at the end of 1996, it was reported that manager Davide Boifava would be building a team around Marco Pantani with Mercatone Uno as the main sponsor. However Luciano Pezzi became the President of that new team, taking with him as directeur sportifs Giuseppe Martinelli, Davide Cassani and Alessandro Giannelli and ten of the riders from Carrera including Pantani. In this way a new team based in Italy was formed with Marco Pantani as the team leader, who rode Bianchi bikes. According to former cycling champion Felice Gimondi the team was built exclusively around Pantani with directeur sportif: Martinelli refused to sign a sprinter, as this could have created other objectives for the team. According to Gimondi, the team was conceived similarly to the way the Bianchi cycling team was conceived in the mid-1940s as a team built around Fausto Coppi. In the 1997 season, Pantani finished third overall at the 1997 Tour de France and won several stages including the stage to the Alpe d'Huez. The following year Pantani won the 1998 Giro d'Italia and then won the 1998 Tour de France – becoming only the seventh rider in history to achieve the Giro–Tour double. Pantani dedicated his win to the recently deceased General manager of Mercatone Uno Luciano Pezzi. After achieving this great success, the head of the branch of the Mercatone Uno supermarkets, Romano Cenni, said that the sponsor would remain in cycling as long as Pantani was still cycling. In the 1999 Giro d'Italia, Pantani dominated the race until he was suspended from due to a high haematocrit level. As a result, the entire Mercatone Uno team withdrew from the race. The following year the team won the 2000 Giro d'Italia with Stefano Garzelli, for which he thanked Pantani for help. Although Garzelli had a contract that run until the end of the 2001 season, he left the team at the end of 2000. When Pantani abandoned the 2002 Giro d'Italia, there was immediate talk of Mercatone Uno stopping its sponsorship after the 2002 season as the team had not been invited to the 2001 and 2002 Tour de France. However, the team continued during the 2003 season where Pantani rode to 14th overall in the 2003 Giro d'Italia. The team was disbanded at the end of 2003 due to the probable retirement of Pantani with several riders going to the South African team Barloworld.

== Major wins ==
1992
Stage 18 Vuelta a España, Enrico Zaina
1993
Settimana Ciclistica Lombarda, Enrico Zaina
Profronde van Made, Adri van der Poel
Profronde van Surhuisterveen, Adri van der Poel
Stages 2, 8 & 18 Giro d'Italia, Adriano Baffi
1994
Giro di Toscana, Francesco Casagrande
Criterium d'Abruzzo, Michele Bartoli
Firenze–Pistoia, Francesco Casagrande
Trofeo Luis Puig, Adriano Baffi
Stages 1 & 6 Paris–Nice, Mario Cipollini
Stage 1 Tirreno–Adriatico, Adriano Baffi
Brabantse Pijl, Michele Bartoli
Grand Prix Pino Cerami, Michele Bartoli
GP Industria & Artigianato di Larciano, Francesco Casagrande
Stage 13 Giro d'Italia, Michele Bartoli
Stage 15 Tour de France, Eros Poli
Stages 2 & 3 Volta Ciclista a Catalunya, Simone Biasci
Stage 6 Volta Ciclista a Catalunya, Massimo Donati
Giro della Romagna, Giuseppe Petito
Giro dell'Emilia, Francesco Casagrande
Milano–Torino, Francesco Casagrande
1995
Settimana Ciclistica Lombarda, Massimiliano Lelli
Profronde van Oostvoorne, Mario Cipollini
Italy National Time Trial championships, Massimiliano Lelli
Overall Driedaagse van De Panne, Michele Bartoli
Firenze–Pistoia, Francesco Casagrande
Coppa Placci, Francesco Casagrande
Trofeo Luis Puig, Mario Cipollini
Stages 4 & 5 Volta a la Comunitat Valenciana, Mario Cipollini
Stages 2 & 5 Tour de Romandie, Mario Cipollini
Giro dell'Appennino, Francesco Casagrande
Stages 1 & 3 Giro d'Italia, Mario Cipollini
Stages 2, 3 & 5 Volta Ciclista a Catalunya, Mario Cipollini
Stages 2 & 4 Tour de France, Mario Cipollini
Milano–Vignola, Angelo Canzonieri
1997
Ronde van Pijnacker, Marco Pantani
Giro del Mendrisiotto, Beat Zberg
Overall Giro di Toscana, Sergio Barbero
Coppa Placci, Beat Zberg
Stage 7 Tirreno–Adriatico
Stages 13 & 15 Tour de France, Marco Pantani
Stage 19 Tour de France, Mario Traversoni
Urkiola Igoera – Subida Urkiola, Beat Zberg
Stage 7 Tour de Pologne, Markus Zberg
1998
GP Tell, Marco Velo
De Draai van de Kaai, Marco Pantani
Profronde van Surhuisterveen, Marco Pantani
Firenze–Pistoia, Marco Velo
Gala Tour de France, Marco Pantani
Stage 4 Volta a la Comunitat Valenciana, Dimitri Konyshev
Overall Giro d'Italia, Marco Pantani

, Mountains classification, Marco Pantani
Stages 14 & 19, Marco Pantani
Stage 16, Fabio Fontanelli

Overall Tour de Suisse, Stefano Garzelli

Points classification, Stefano Garzelli
Combination classification, Stefano Garzelli
Stages 5 & 6, Stefano Garzelli

Italy National Time Trial championships, Marco Velo
Overall Tour de France, Marco Pantani

Stages 11 & 15, Marco Pantani

Urkiola Igoera - Subida Urkiola, Simone Borgheresi
Boucles de l'Aulne, Marco Pantani
1999
Firenze–Pistoia, Marco Velo
Roma Maxima, Sergio Barbero
Overall Vuelta Ciclista a Murcia – Costa Calida, Marco Pantani

Stage 4, Marco Pantani

Stage 2 Setmana Catalana de Ciclisme, Marco Pantani
Stage 5a Setmana Catalana de Ciclisme, Fabiano Fontanelli
GP Miguel Induráin, Stefano Garzelli
Stage 3 Vuelta Ciclista al País Vasco, Stefano Garzelli
Paris–Camembert Lepetit, Fabiano Fontanelli
GP Industria & Artigianato di Larciano, Massimo Podenzana
Stages 8, 15, 19 & 20 Giro d'Italia, Marco Pantani
Giro dell'Appennino, Simone Borgheresi
Italy National Time Trial championships, Marco Velo
Stage 14 Tour de France, Dimitri Konyshev
Tre Valli Varesine, Sergio Barbero
GP Llodio, Marco Velo
Giro della Romagna, Roberto Conti
Grand Prix de Fourmies, Dimitri Konyshev
Coppa Sabatini, Dimitri Konyshev
Japan Cup, Sergio Barbero
2000
Acht van Chaam, Marco Pantani
Profronde van Stiphout, Marco Pantani
Overall Giro del Trentino, Simone Borgheresi
Overall Giro d'Italia, Stefano Garzelli

Stage 18, Stefano Garzelli

Overall Tour of Sweden, Michael Andersson

Stage 2, Michael Andersson

Stage 8 Tour de Suisse, Stefano Garzelli

Mountains classification Stefano Garzelli

Sweden National Time Trial championship, Michael Andersson
Italy National Time Trial championships, Marco Velo
Stages 12 & 15 Tour de France, Marco Pantani
2001
Klasika Primavera, Igor Astarloa
Stage 7 Volta Ciclista a Catalunya, Daniele De Paoli
Italy National Time Trial championships, Marco Velo
2002
GP Città di Rio Saliceto e Correggio, Fabiano Fontanelli
Giro della Provincia di Lucca, Fabiano Fontanelli
Kazakhstan National Time Trial championships, Andrey Mizurov
2003
Giro del Friuli, Joseba Albizu
Stage 2 Ster Elektrotoer, Eddy Serri
Stage 4 Ster Elektrotoer, Luca Solari
Stage 5 Ster Elektrotoer, Enrico Degano

=== Supplementary statistics ===
Note: The team did not exist for the 1996 Season.

Grand Tours by highest finishing position
Race	1992	1993	1994	1995	1996 (Note: The team did not exist in 1996)	1997	1998	1999	2000	2001	2002	2003
Giro d'Italia	14	11	22	10	–	9	1	DNF (Note: The team pulled out after stage 21 after Marco Pantani who was winning the race was kicked out for having too high a hemacrit level.)	1	11	37	14
Tour de France	–	–	42	43	–	3	1	32	37	–	–	–
/ Vuelta a España	54	39	13	9	–	–	–	–	–	46	–	–
Major week-long stage races by highest finishing position
Race	1992	1993	1994	1995	1996	1997	1998	1999	2000	2001	2002	2003
Tour Down Under	Did not Exist							–	–	–	–	–
/ Paris–Nice	–	68	22	6	–	–	–	–	–	–	–	–
Tirreno–Adriatico	17	20	15	7	–	3	–	3	22	23	19	–
Volta a Catalunya	–	–	9	30	–	–	4	12	–	–	–	–
Tour of the Basque Country	–	–	4	–	–	3	15	8	28	26	–	49
Tour de Romandie	–	–	–	2	–	3	20	39	–	–	–	–
Critérium du Dauphiné	–	–	–	–	–	–	–	–	–	–	–	–
Tour de Suisse	–	–	–	–	–	8	1	–	9	–	–	–
Tour de Pologne	–	–	–	–	–	8	–	–	–	–	–	–
Ronde van Nederland	–	34	15	51	–	–	–	–	–	–	–	–
Monument races by highest finishing position
Monument	1992	1993	1994	1995	1996	1997	1998	1999	2000	2001	2002	2003
Milan–San Remo	30	11	2	5	–	12	38	4	7	24	68	–
Tour of Flanders	35	33	36	7	–	–	–	31	55	DNF	–	–
Paris–Roubaix	–	5	–	32	–	–	DNF	DNF	–	–	–	–
Liège–Bastogne–Liège	25	80	17	3	–	7	28	13	19	11	21	–
Giro di Lombardia	39	36	11	3	–	21	11	5	35	38	24	65
Classics by highest finishing position
Classic	1992	1993	1994	1995	1996	1997	1998	1999	2000	2001	2002	2003
Omloop Het Volk	26	–	69	–	–	–	–	–	–	–	–	–
Kuurne–Brussels–Kuurne	26	NH	25	–	–	–	–	–	–	–	–	–
E3 Harelbeke	21	6	3	21	–	–	–	–	–	–	–	–
Gent–Wevelgem	27	9	19	4	–	–	–	–	–	–	–	–
Amstel Gold Race	–	6	34	10	–	3	23	10	16	15	–	–
La Flèche Wallonne	–	7	6	4	–	5	47	7	15	27	81	–
Clásica de San Sebastián	32	25	36	11	–	7	49	14	79	20	–	–
Paris–Tours	27	5	4	9	–	–	15	53	40	–	–	–

Legend
—	Did not compete
DNF	Did not finish
NH	Not held

== Famous Mercatone Uno cyclists ==
- Marco Pantani
- Michele Bartoli
- Francesco Casagrande
- Dmitri Konychev
- Bruno Leali
- Adriano Baffi
- John Talen
- Roberto Petito
- Mario Cipollini
- Dario Frigo
- Eddy Mazzoleni
- Stefano Garzelli
- Daniel Clavero
- Sylvester Szmyd
