= 2000 Volta a la Comunitat Valenciana =

Race details
- Dates: 22–26 February 2000
- Stages: 5
- Distance: 797.8 km (495.7 mi)
- Winning time: 20h 09' 42"

Results
| | Winner | Abraham Olano (ESP) | (ONCE–Deutsche Bank) |
| | Second | Juan Carlos Domínguez (ESP) | (Vitalicio Seguros) |
| | Third | José Alberto Martínez (ESP) | (Euskaltel–Euskadi) |

The 2000 Volta a la Comunitat Valenciana was the 58th edition of the Volta a la Comunitat Valenciana road cycling stage race, which was held from 22 February to 26 February 2000. The race started in Sagunto and finished in Valencia. The race was won by Abraham Olano of the ONCE–Deutsche Bank team.

== General classification ==
Final general classification

| Rank | Rider | Team | Time |
|---|---|---|---|
| 1 | Abraham Olano (ESP) | ONCE–Deutsche Bank | 20h 09' 42" |
| 2 | Juan Carlos Domínguez (ESP) | Vitalicio Seguros | + 21" |
| 3 | José Alberto Martínez (ESP) | Euskaltel–Euskadi | + 47" |
| 4 | Toni Tauler (ESP) | Kelme–Costa Blanca | + 50" |
| 5 | Laurent Jalabert (FRA) | ONCE–Deutsche Bank | + 1' 12" |
| 6 | Marco Velo (ITA) | Mercatone Uno–Albacom | + 1' 29" |
| 7 | Wladimir Belli (ITA) | Fassa Bortolo | + 1' 39" |
| 8 | Giuseppe Di Grande (ITA) | Festina | + 1' 48" |
| 9 | Javier Pascual Llorente (ESP) | Kelme–Costa Blanca | + 1' 51" |
| 10 | Massimiliano Lelli (ITA) | Cofidis | + 1' 59" |
