= Laurent Jalabert =

French cyclist

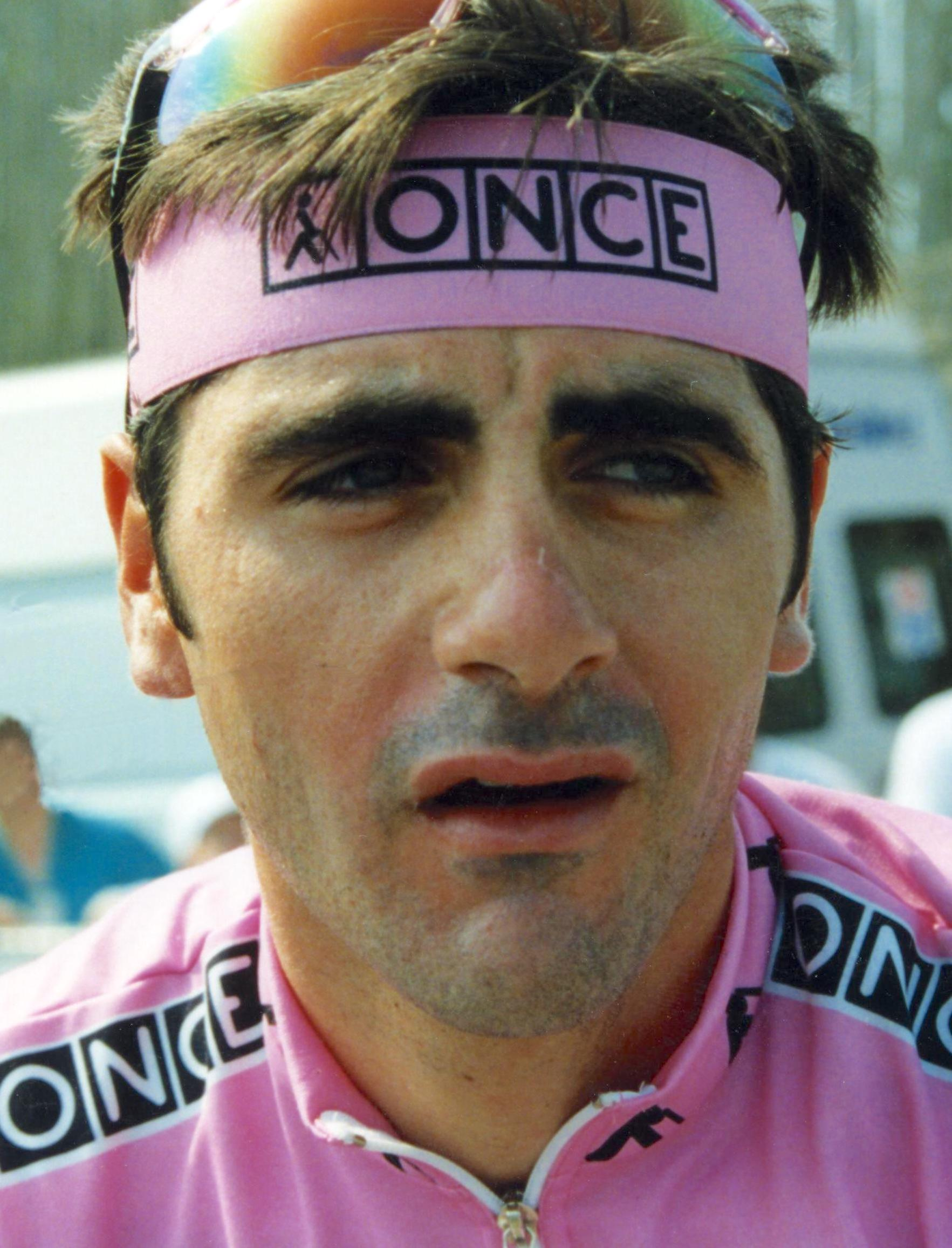
- Jalabert at the 1993 Tour de France

Personal information
- Full name: Laurent Jalabert
- Nicknames: Jaja; Le panda
- Born: 30 November 1968 (age 57) Mazamet, France
- Height: 1.76 m (5 ft 9 1/2 in)
- Weight: 66 kg (146 lb; 10 st 6 lb)

Cycling career
- Sport: Cycling
- Current team: Retired
- Discipline: Road
- Role: Rider
- Rider type: All-rounder

Amateur teams
- 1987: US Montauban
- 1988: GSC Blagnac

Professional teams
- 1989–1991: Toshiba
- 1992–2000: ONCE
- 2001–2002: CSC–Tiscali

Major wins
- Grand Tours Tour de France Points classification (1992, 1995) Mountains classification (2001, 2002) 4 individual stages (1992, 1995, 2001) 1 TTT stage (2000) Combativity award (2001, 2002) Giro d'Italia Points classification (1999) 3 individual stages (1999) Vuelta a España General classification (1995) Points classification (1994–1997) Mountains classification (1995) 18 individual stages (1993–1997) Stage races Paris–Nice (1995, 1996, 1997) Volta a Catalunya (1995) Tour de Romandie (1999) Tour of the Basque Country (1999) One-day races and Classics World Time Trial Championships (1997) National Road Race Championships (1998) Milan–San Remo (1995) Giro di Lombardia (1997) La Flèche Wallonne (1995, 1997) Milano–Torino (1997) Clásica de San Sebastián (2001, 2002) Other UCI Road World Rankings (1995, 1996, 1997, 1999) Vélo d'Or (1995)
Medal record
Representing France
Men's road bicycle racing
World Championships
Gold medal – first place	1997 San Sebastián	Elite Men's Time Trial
Silver medal – second place	1992 Benidorm	Elite Men's Road Race

Laurent Jalabert (born 30 November 1968) is a French former professional road racing cyclist, from 1989 to 2002. Despite neither denying nor admitting using EPO in his notorious cycling teams throughout the 1990s, French Senate investigation proved his EPO use in 2013.

Affectionately known as "Jaja" (slang for a glass of wine; when he continued drinking wine as a professional, the nickname stuck because of the similarity to his name), he won many one-day and stage races and was ranked number 1 in the world in 1995, 1996, 1997 and 1999.

Although he never won the Tour de France, where he suffered altitude sickness, he won the Vuelta a España in 1995; as well as the leader's jersey, he won the sprinter's jersey and climber's jersey in the same race — only the third rider to have done this in a Grand Tour. With Alessandro Petacchi, Eddy Merckx, Djamolidine Abdoujaparov, Mark Cavendish, and Mads Pedersen, he is one of only six riders to win the points classification in all three grand tours. As winner of the 1995 edition of the Vuelta a España, Jalabert is the last French winner of any of the three Grand Tours.

== Biography ==
He turned professional with the French Toshiba team in 1989 and quickly established himself as a daring sprinter. He moved on to the Spanish ONCE team under Manolo Saiz, where he reinvented himself as an all-rounder capable of winning one-day races and the tours.

A catalyst was an accident at the finish of the 1994 Tour de France stage in Armentières. A policeman leaned out and several riders hit him. Jalabert was flung into the air and his bicycle was destroyed. He injured his face and promised his wife to change his style of riding. It only took a short while.

He won the 1995 Vuelta a España along with the points and climbers' competitions. He won the world time trial championship in 1997, and was French road champion in 1998, the year he initiated a pull-out of Spanish teams from the 1998 Tour de France in protest at treatment of riders in a police inquiry into drug-taking. This caused discontent among French fans and it took years for them to warm to him. He moved to CSC in 2001, where he won the stage on 14 July, the French national day, Bastille Day, in the 2001 Tour de France. Earlier in the year he had injured his back in a domestic accident. He retired in 2002 after winning the mountains classification in the Tour de France and going on a solo escape in the Pyrenees.

== Grand tours ==
He won several stages of the Tour de France, as a sprinter winning the points classification in the Tour de France twice and as a climber winning the mountains classification in the Tour de France twice. His wins on Bastille Day in Tour de France in 1995 and 2001 ensured him a place in the hearts of French fans.

In the 1990s he dominated Spanish stage races. Jalabert and Alex Zülle were a constant threat to other teams in the Vuelta a España, taking turns winning stages, the overall classification and the points jersey. The strength of ONCE, with domestiques such as Johan Bruyneel and Neil Stephens, meant they were able to keep a rein from start to finish.

Besides Eddy Merckx and Tony Rominger, Jalabert is the only other cyclist who has accomplished the trifecta at the grand tour level in the 1995 Vuelta a España, where he won the general, sprinters' and climbers' classifications.

Jalabert is known for sporting generosity. In the 1995 Vuelta he allowed Bert Dietz of Telekom — who had been in a solo breakaway for many kilometers — to take the mountaintop stage win at Sierra Nevada even though he had caught Dietz in the final kilometers. "I never thought we'd catch him, and when I saw he was ready to drop I felt sorry for him. I wanted to show it's not true I'm trying to win it all. My goal is the Tour of Spain," Jalabert said.

When the Vuelta was moved to September, Jalabert was finally able to compete in the spring classics and stage races such as Paris–Nice, winning many stages and the overall classification many times.

== One-day races ==
His palmarès include Milan–San Remo in 1995 and the Giro di Lombardia in 1997. He also won La Flèche Wallonne in 1995 and 1997, and the Clásica de San Sebastián in 2001 and 2002. Absent from his palmares is the world cycling championship road race, although he was second in 1992 to Gianni Bugno of Italy. He also won an award as the most combative rider in the Tour de France in 2001 and 2002.

== Retirement ==
Upon retirement, Jalabert became a consultant for Look cycles and contributed to a new line of bicycle frames. He is a commentator for France 2 and 3, the national television stations, often from a motorcycle alongside the race. In 2005, Jalabert ran the New York City marathon in 2h 55m 39s, coming 391st in a field of 36,894. He lives with his wife Sylvie and their children at Lafrançaise, near Montauban, south-west France. His brother Nicolas, who often raced with him, continued racing after Laurent's retirement.

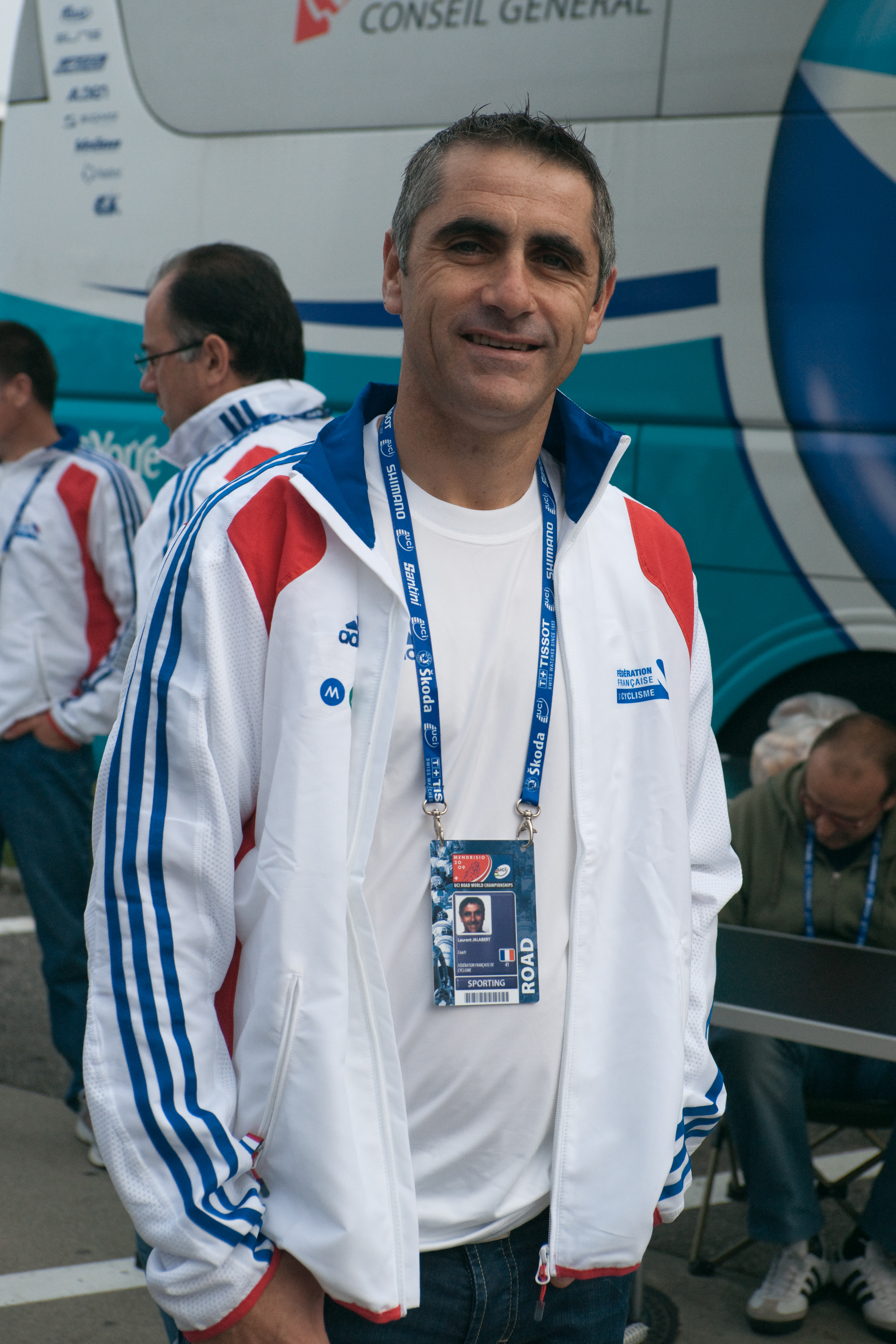
Jalabert at the 2009 UCI Road World Championships

Jalabert has also taken up triathlon. In January 2007, he competed at Ironman Switzerland and finished in 9 hours 12 minutes. He exited the water in 1:16, which put him 966th after the swim. Once on the bike he made up significant ground with a 4:39 bike split, which allowed him to climb to 91st overall at the run transition. A 3:11 marathon was enough to gain an additional 69 places and finish 22nd of 1,850 participants. After Switzerland he qualified for the Ironman World championship in Kona, Hawaii, finishing in 9:19 and 76th overall. In June, 2008, he finished 12th overall at Ironman France in Nice, improving his swim time to 1:06 and having the second fastest bike split.

On 11 March 2013 Jalabert was hit by a car while riding his bike near Montauban, France. When the ambulance arrived on the scene of the crash, he was found unconscious and with multiple fractures to his left arm and leg. That same year, Jalabert was summoned by the French senate for a testimony about doping. Jalabert never denied or confirmed that he had doped during his career: "I can’t firmly say that I’ve never taken anything illegal. I’ve effectively used products when it was necessary, in case of lesions or other injuries. At ONCE, in the evening after the stages, the doctor took care of us, for our recovery, but we didn’t really know what it was. A relationship with doctors based on mutual trust was established, so we didn’t ask questions." He also stated that after the Festina affair, he wanted to help his sport move in a new, cleaner direction. In June 2013, it was reported in L'Équipe that retroactive tests performed in 2004 had found evidence of EPO use in samples provided by Jalabert in 1998. The re-tests were originally anonymous, but the Senate inquiry in 2013 has subsequently linked the tests to named riders. Because of these allegations on EPO usage Jalabert has been accused of hypocrisy in criticism of Chris Froome's performance in the 2015 Tour de France.

== Doping ==
His name was on the list of doping tests published by the French Senate on 24 July 2013 that were collected during the 1998 Tour de France and found positive for EPO when retested in 2004.

== Career achievements ==
=== Major results ===
1988
8th Overall Tour de la Communauté Européenne

1st Points classification

1989
1st Overall Tour d'Armorique

1st Stage 1

1st Stage 3 Tour du Limousin
1st Stage 3 (TTT) Tour de la Communauté Européenne
3rd Trofeo Luis Puig
10th Grand Prix de Wallonie
1990
1st Overall Paris–Bourges

1st Stage 1

1st Stage 3 Circuit de la Sarthe
2nd Clásica de San Sebastián
2nd Philadelphia International Cycling Classic
3rd Overall Tour de la Communauté Européenne

1st Points classification

4th Overall Tour du Limousin
4th Grand Prix de Wallonie
5th Grand Prix d'Isbergues
6th Overall Route du Sud
6th Road race, UCI Road World Championships
9th Overall Kellogg's Tour
9th Grand Prix du Morbihan
10th Grand Prix de Fourmies
1991
2nd UCI Road World Cup
2nd Overall Paris–Nice
2nd Overall Four Days of Dunkirk

1st Stage 2a

2nd Züri-Metzgete
3rd Grand Prix de Cannes
4th Overall Tour de l'Oise
4th Clásica de San Sebastián
7th Amstel Gold Race
7th Paris–Tours
7th Paris–Camembert
7th Grand Prix de Fourmies
8th Giro di Lombardia
9th Tour of Flanders
10th Overall Grand Prix du Midi Libre
10th Grand Prix des Nations
1992
Tour de France

1st Points classification
1st Stage 6

Volta a Catalunya

1st Points classification
1st Stages 2, 5a & 7

Vuelta a Burgos

1st Points classification
1st Stages 3, 4 & 6

1st Stage 3 Euskal Bizikleta
2nd Road race, UCI Road World Championships
2nd Wincanton Classic
3rd Trofeo Luis Puig
4th Coppa Placci
5th UCI Road World Cup
5th Paris–Tours
6th Grand Prix des Amériques
7th Giro dell'Emilia
8th Züri-Metzgete
9th Milan–San Remo
10th Overall Volta a la Comunitat Valenciana
1993
1st Overall Vuelta a La Rioja

1st Stages 2 & 3

1st Overall Vuelta a Mallorca

1st Stages 2, 3 & 4

1st Trofeo Luis Puig
1st Clasica de Alcobendas
Vuelta a España

1st Stages 3 & 7

Volta a Catalunya

1st Points classification
1st Stages 3 & 4

Paris–Nice

1st Stages 2 (TTT) & 8a

Volta a la Comunitat Valenciana

1st Points classification
1st Stage 6

1st Stage 3 Vuelta Asturias
1st Stage 5 Vuelta a Castilla y León
1st Stage 1 Tour of Galicia
3rd Boucles de l'Aulne
4th Milan–San Remo
4th GP Ouest–France
5th Trofeo Masferrer
7th Gent–Wevelgem
8th Overall Grand Prix du Midi Libre
9th Liège–Bastogne–Liège
1994
Vuelta a España

1st Points classification
1st Stages 2, 3, 5, 12, 13, 16 & 21

1st Stage 5 Grand Prix du Midi Libre
1st Stage 5 Volta a Catalunya
2nd Trofeo Luis Puig
4th Road race, National Road Championships
5th Giro del Piemonte
6th Trofeo Masferrer
7th Overall Tour of the Basque Country

1st Stage 2

8th Paris–Tours
9th Overall Critérium International
10th Milan–San Remo
1995
1st Overall Vuelta a España

1st Points classification
1st Mountains classification
1st Stages 3, 5, 8, 15, & 17

1st Overall Paris–Nice

1st Stage 2

1st Overall Volta a Catalunya

1st Stages 1 & 7

1st Overall Critérium International

1st Stages 1 & 2

1st Milan–San Remo
1st La Flèche Wallonne
1st Klasika Primavera
1st Boucles de l'Aulne
1st Stage 3 Grand Prix du Midi Libre
1st Stage 2 Vuelta a Mallorca
2nd Overall Tour of the Basque Country
2nd Overall Volta a la Comunitat Valenciana

1st Stage 2b

4th Overall Tour de France

1st Points classification
1st Stage 12
Held after Stages 2–3

4th Liège–Bastogne–Liège
4th Clásica de San Sebastián
6th Overall Grand Prix du Midi Libre
6th Leeds International Classic
7th Overall Tour of Galicia

1st Stage 3

1996
1st Overall Paris–Nice

1st Stages 3 & 4

1st Overall Grand Prix du Midi Libre

1st Points classification
1st Stages 2 & 5

1st Overall Route du Sud
1st Overall Volta a la Comunitat Valenciana

1st Points classification
1st Stage 1

1st Classique des Alpes
1st Classic Haribo
Vuelta a España

1st Points classification
1st Stages 3 & 13

1st Stage 1 Tour of the Basque Country
2nd Overall French Road Cycling Cup
2nd Trofeo Foral de Navarra
3rd Overall Tour of Galicia
3rd Milano–Torino
5th Vuelta a Burgos
5th Paris–Tours
6th Overall Escalada a Montjuïc
6th Tour du Haut Var
7th Road race, UCI Road World Championships
9th Giro di Lombardia
10th Clásica de San Sebastián
10th Züri-Metzgete
1997
1st Time trial, UCI Road World Championships
1st Overall Paris–Nice

1st Prologue & Stage 6

1st Overall Vuelta a Burgos

1st Stage 2

1st Overall Escalada a Montjuïc

1st Stages 1a & 1b (ITT)

1st Giro di Lombardia
1st La Flèche Wallonne
1st Milano–Torino
1st Boucles de l'Aulne
1st Trofeo Sóller
2nd Overall Tour of the Basque Country

1st Stages 2 & 4

2nd Overall Vuelta a Castilla y León

1st Stage 1

2nd Overall Critérium International
2nd Liège–Bastogne–Liège
2nd Klasika Primavera
2nd Trofeo Palma de Mallorca
3rd Tour du Haut Var
5th UCI Road World Cup
7th Overall Vuelta a España

1st Points classification
1st Stages 6 & 20
Held after Stage 6

7th Amstel Gold Race
7th Trofeo Manacor
1998
1st Road race, National Road Championships
1st Overall Vuelta a Asturias

1st Prologue & Stage 6

Tour de Suisse

1st Prologue, Stages 3 & 8 (ITT)

1st Tour du Haut Var
1st Classique des Alpes
2nd Overall Paris–Nice
2nd Overall Tour of the Basque Country

1st Stages 1 & 5b (ITT)

2nd Overall Vuelta a Andalucía
2nd Overall Setmana Catalana de Ciclisme
2nd Liège–Bastogne–Liège
3rd Overall Euskal Bizikleta

1st Stages 3 & 4a

5th Overall Vuelta a España

Held after Stage 3
Held after Stage 9

6th Trofeo Manacor
1999
1st Overall Tour de Romandie

1st Points classification
1st Prologue, Stages 2 & 3b (ITT)

1st Overall Tour of the Basque Country

1st Stage 1 & 5b (ITT)

1st Overall Setmana Catalana de Ciclisme

1st Points classification
1st Stage 5b (ITT)

1st Prueba Villafranca de Ordizia
2nd Overall Tour de Suisse

1st Points classification
1st Prologue

2nd Grand Prix Breitling (with Abraham Olano)
4th Overall Giro d'Italia

1st Points classification
1st Stages 4, 9 & 16
Held after Stages 5–7 & 9–13

4th Overall Tirreno–Adriatico
4th GP Miguel Induráin
4th Klasika Primavera
2000
1st Overall Setmana Catalana de Ciclisme

1st Stage 5b (ITT)

1st Overall Tour Méditerranéen

1st Stage 5

1st Stage 7 Critérium du Dauphiné Libéré
Tour de France

1st Stage 4 (TTT)
Held after Stages 4 & 5

2nd GP Miguel Induráin
3rd Overall Tour of the Basque Country

1st Stage 4

3rd La Flèche Wallonne
4th Overall Tirreno–Adriatico

1st Stage 3

Olympic Games

5th Road race
5th Time trial

5th Overall Volta a la Comunitat Valenciana
8th Grand Prix EnBW (with Abraham Olano)
10th Liège–Bastogne–Liège
10th Subida al Naranco
10th Chrono des Nations
2001
1st Clásica de San Sebastián
1st Polynormande
Tour de France

1st Mountains classification
1st Stages 4 & 7
Combativity award Overall

2nd Overall Four Days of Dunkirk
4th Overall Grand Prix du Midi Libre
5th Road race, National Road Championships
9th Overall Tour de Suisse
2002
1st Clásica de San Sebastián
1st Coppa Ugo Agostoni
1st Tour du Haut Var
1st CSC Classic
Tour de France

1st Mountains classification
Combativity award Overall

1st Mountains classification, Tour du Poitou Charentes et de la Vienne
2nd Grand Prix de Fourmies
2nd Karlsruher Versicherungs-Grand Prix (with Nicolas Jalabert)
3rd Overall Paris–Nice

1st Stage 3

3rd Memorial Rik Van Steenbergen
5th Overall Tour of Qatar
9th GP Ouest-France
10th Chrono des Nations

==== General classification results timeline ====
Grand Tour general classification results
Grand Tour	1990	1991	1992	1993	1994	1995	1996	1997	1998	1999	2000	2001	2002
Giro d'Italia	—	—	DNF	—	—	—	—	—	—	4	—	—	—
Tour de France	—	71	34	DNF	DNF	4	DNF	43	DNF	—	54	19	42
/ Vuelta a España	70	—	—	35	75	1	19	7	5	DNF	—	—	—
Major stage race general classification results
Major stage race	1990	1991	1992	1993	1994	1995	1996	1997	1998	1999	2000	2001	2002
/ Paris–Nice	11	2	—	111	40	1	1	1	2	—	—	—	3
Tirreno–Adriatico	—	—	—	—	—	—	—	—	—	4	4	—	—
Tour of the Basque Country	—	—	—	—	7	2	13	2	2	1	3	—	—
/ Tour de Romandie	—	—	—	—	—	—	—	—	—	1	DNF	—	—
Critérium du Dauphiné	—	58	—	—	—	—	DNF	—	DNF	—	12	—	44
Volta a Catalunya	—	—	64	71	DNF	1	—	—	—	—	—	—	—
Tour de Suisse	—	—	—	—	—	—	—	DNF	22	2	—	9	—

==== Classics results timeline ====
Monument	1990	1991	1992	1993	1994	1995	1996	1997	1998	1999	2000	2001	2002
Milan–San Remo	41	17	9	4	10	1	—	17	15	115	11	—	69
Tour of Flanders	—	9	24	57	16	—	—	80	—	—	—	—	—
Paris–Roubaix	—	18	—	26	—	—	—	—	—	—	—	—	—
Liège–Bastogne–Liège	—	11	57	9	37	4	—	2	2	DNF	10	—	—
Giro di Lombardia	—	8	—	—	22	—	9	1	—	—	—	—	—
Classic	1990	1991	1992	1993	1994	1995	1996	1997	1998	1999	2000	2001	2002
Amstel Gold Race	—	7	—	—	—	—	—	7	—	28	—	—	—
La Flèche Wallonne	—	—	18	—	—	1	—	1	19	DNF	3	—	—
Clásica de San Sebastián	2	4	103	34	—	4	10	19	59	—	—	1	1
Züri-Metzgete	—	2	—	68	—	12	10	26	—	—	—	—	91
Paris–Tours	—	7	5	—	8	—	5	28	—	—	—	—	—

Legend
—	Did not compete
DNF	Did not finish

=== Awards ===
1st in (UCI) rankings: (1995, 1996, 1997 and 1999) (2nd in 1998)
Vélo d'Or international (1995) (2nd in 1997)
Vélo d'Or national (1992, 1995, 2002)
Mendrisio d'Oro (1995)

=== Ironman ===
22nd Ironman Switzerland (2007)
76th Ironman World Championship (2007)
12th Ironman France (2008)
376th Ironman World Championship (2018)
