= 1995 Volta a la Comunitat Valenciana =

Race details
- Dates: 22–26 February 1995
- Stages: 5
- Winning time: 20h 36' 30"

Results
	Winner	Alex Zülle (SUI)	(ONCE)
	Second	Laurent Jalabert (FRA)	(ONCE)
	Third	Abraham Olano (ESP)	(Mapei–GB–Latexco)

The 1995 Volta a la Comunitat Valenciana was the 53rd edition of the Volta a la Comunitat Valenciana road cycling stage race, which was held from 22 to 26 February 1995. The race started in Calpe and finished in Castellón. The race was won by Alex Zülle of the ONCE team.

== General classification ==
Final general classification

Rank	Rider	Team	Time
1	Alex Zülle (SUI)	ONCE	20h 36' 30"
2	Laurent Jalabert (FRA)	ONCE	+ 10"
3	Abraham Olano (ESP)	Mapei–GB–Latexco	+ 31"
4	Gianni Bugno (ITA)	MG Maglificio–Technogym	+ 35"
5	Michele Bartoli (ITA)	Mercatone Uno–Saeco	+ 45"
6	Johan Bruyneel (BEL)	ONCE	s.t.
7	Viatcheslav Ekimov (RUS)	Novell–Decca–Colnago	+ 47"
8	Serguei Outschakov (UKR)	Polti–Granarolo–Santini	+ 57"
9	Davide Rebellin (ITA)	MG Maglificio–Technogym	+ 59"
10	Gabriele Colombo (ITA)	Gewiss–Ballan	+ 1' 08"
