= 1999 Volta a la Comunitat Valenciana =

Race details
- Dates: 23–27 February 1999
- Stages: 5
- Distance: 768.6 km (477.6 mi)
- Winning time: 19h 50' 14"

Results
	Winner	Alexander Vinokourov (KAZ)	(Casino–Ag2r Prévoyance)
	Second	Wladimir Belli (ITA)	(Festina–Lotus)
	Third	Javier Pascual Rodríguez (ESP)	(Kelme–Costa Blanca)

The 1999 Volta a la Comunitat Valenciana was the 57th edition of the Volta a la Comunitat Valenciana road cycling stage race, which was held from 23 February to 27 February 1999. The race started in Villarreal and finished in Benidorm. The race was won by Alexander Vinokourov of the Casino–Ag2r Prévoyance team.

== General classification ==
Final general classification

Rank	Rider	Team	Time
1	Alexander Vinokourov (KAZ)	Casino–Ag2r Prévoyance	19h 50' 14"
2	Wladimir Belli (ITA)	Festina–Lotus	+ 8"
3	Javier Pascual Rodríguez (ESP)	Kelme–Costa Blanca	+ 35"
4	David Millar (GBR)	Cofidis	+ 39"
5	Santiago Botero (COL)	Kelme–Costa Blanca	+ 44"
6	Claus Michael Møller (DEN)	TVM–Farm Frites	+ 46"
7	Melcior Mauri (ESP)	Benfica–Winterthur	+ 53"
8	Michele Bartoli (ITA)	Mapei–Quick-Step	+ 1' 01"
9	Luis Pérez Rodríguez (ESP)	ONCE–Deutsche Bank	+ 1' 03"
10	Michael Boogerd (NED)	Rabobank	+ 1' 08"
