= 1997 Tour du Haut Var =

Race details
- Dates: 22 February 1997
- Stages: 1
- Distance: 202 km (125.5 mi)
- Winning time: 5h 09' 25"

Results
	Winner	Rodolfo Massi (ITA)
	Second	Richard Virenque (FRA)
	Third	Laurent Jalabert (FRA)

The 1997 Tour du Haut Var was the 29th edition of the Tour du Haut Var cycle race and was held on 22 February 1997. The race started and finished in Draguignan. The race was won by Rodolfo Massi.

== General classification ==
Final general classification

Rank	Rider	Time
1	Rodolfo Massi (ITA)	5h 09' 25"
2	Richard Virenque (FRA)	+ 1' 49"
3	Laurent Jalabert (FRA)	+ 1' 49"
4	Patrick Jonker (AUS)	+ 2' 03"
5	Mikel Zarrabeitia (ESP)	+ 2' 03"
6	Emmanuel Magnien (FRA)	+ 2' 58"
7	Giuseppe Tartaggia (ITA)	+ 2' 58"
8	Marco Velo (ITA)	+ 2' 58"
9	Miguel Arroyo (MEX)	+ 2' 58"
10	Nicola Ramacciotti (ITA)	+ 3' 03"
