= 1996 Volta a la Comunitat Valenciana =

Race details
- Dates: 27 February–2 March 1996
- Stages: 5
- Winning time: 21h 08' 33"

Results
	Winner	Laurent Jalabert (FRA)	(ONCE)
	Second	Íñigo Cuesta (ESP)	(ONCE)
	Third	Mariano Rojas (ESP)	(ONCE)

The 1996 Volta a la Comunitat Valenciana was the 54th edition of the Volta a la Comunitat Valenciana road cycling stage race, which was held from 27 February to 2 March 1996. The race started in Calpe and finished in Valencia. The race was won by Laurent Jalabert of the ONCE team.

== General classification ==
Final general classification

Rank	Rider	Team	Time
1	Laurent Jalabert (FRA)	ONCE	21h 08' 33"
2	Íñigo Cuesta (ESP)	ONCE	+ 20"
3	Mariano Rojas (ESP)	ONCE	+ 28"
4	Aitor Garmendia (ESP)	ONCE	+ 1' 29"
5	Roberto Sierra (ESP)	ONCE	+ 2' 33"
6	Laurent Dufaux (SUI)	Festina–Lotus	+ 2' 54"
7	Didier Rous (FRA)	GAN	+ 12' 01"
8	Maurizio Fondriest (ITA)	Roslotto–ZG Mobili	+ 12' 33"
9	Francesco Frattini (ITA)	Gewiss Playbus	+ 13' 16"
10	Ángel Casero (ESP)	Banesto	+ 13' 19"
