= Beat Zberg =

Swiss cyclist (born 1971)

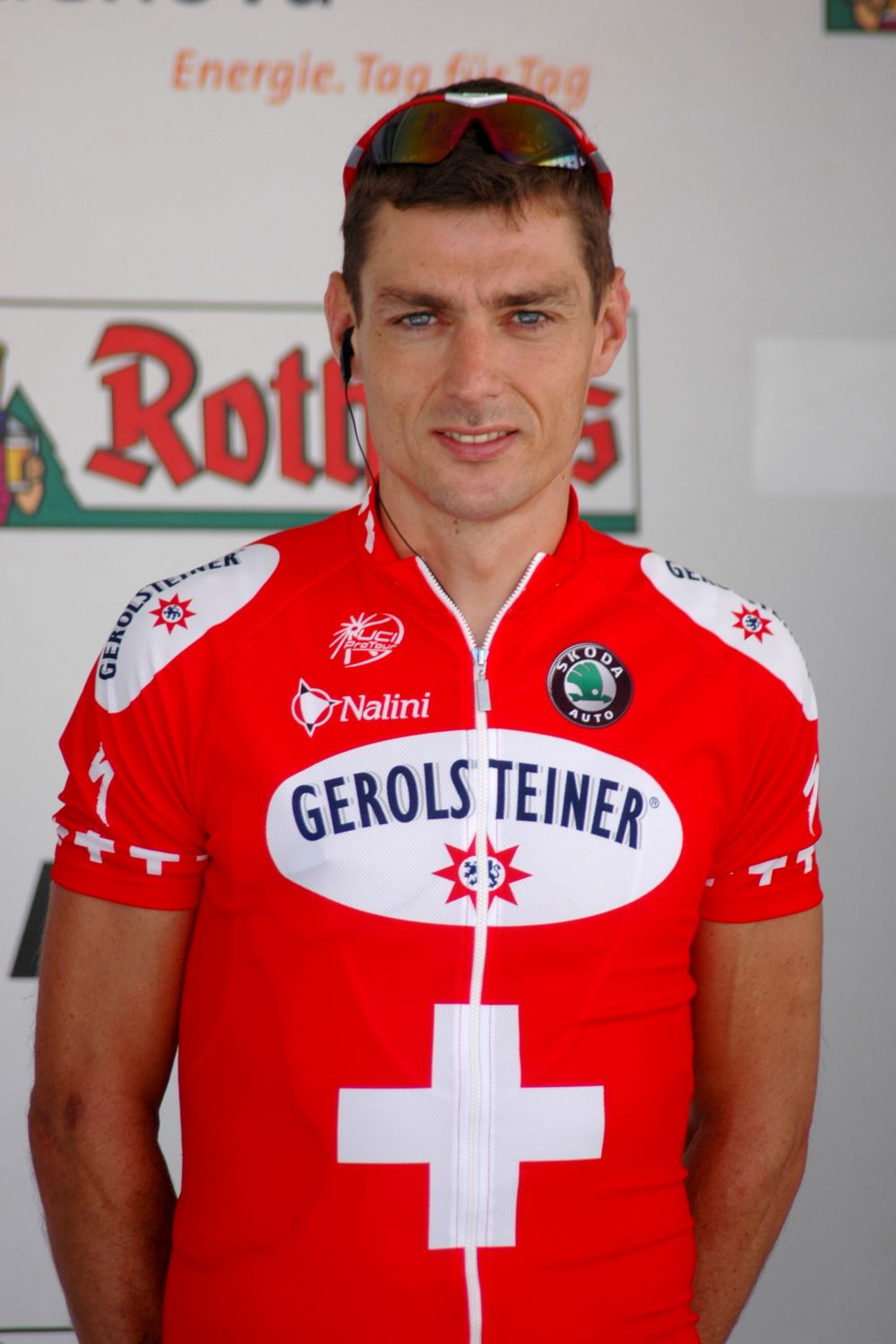

Personal information
- Full name: Beat Zberg
- Born: 10 May 1971 (age 55) Altdorf, Uri
- Height: 1.79 m (5 ft 10 1/2 in)
- Weight: 72 kg (159 lb; 11 st 5 lb)

Cycling career
- Sport: Cycling
- Discipline: Road
- Role: Rider
- Rider type: All-rounder

Professional teams
- 1992: Helvetia–Fichtel & Sachs
- 1993–1996: Carrera Jeans–Tassoni
- 1997: Mercatone Uno
- 1998–2003: Rabobank
- 2004–2007: Gerolsteiner

Major wins
- Vuelta a España, 1 stage Coppa Placci (1997); Rund um den Henninger Turm (1996); Vuelta a Asturias (1995)
Medal record
Representing Switzerland
Men's road bicycle racing
World Championships
Bronze medal – third place	1991 Stuttgart	Amateur road race

Beat Zberg (born 10 May 1971 in Altdorf, Uri) is a Swiss former professional road bicycle racer for UCI ProTeam Gerolsteiner.

In 2007 he became the Swiss National champion, winning the road race alone and over 2 minutes ahead of 2nd placed Fabian Cancellara. Later that year, he retired from active competition.

== Career achievements ==
=== Major results ===
1988
1st National Junior Mountain Championships
National Junior Track Championships

1 km time trial
Omnium

1989
1st Stage 1 Grand Prix Rüebliland
1st Road race, National Junior Road Championships
1st National Junior Mountain Championships
National Junior Track Championships

Omnium
Pursuit

3rd Overall Tour du Pays de Vaud
1990
2nd Kaistenberg Rundfahrt
1991
1st Wartenberg Rundfahrt
2nd Overall GP Tell

1st Stage 8

3rd Amateur Road race, UCI Road World Championships
1992
1st Overall Étoile de Bessèges
1st Trofeo Matteotti
1st Giro di Romagna
1st Wartenberg Rundfahrt
5th Overall Tour de Suisse
5th Tre Valli Varesine
6th Overall Tirreno–Adriatico
6th Giro di Lombardia
1993
1st Gran Piemonte
1st Kaistenberg Rundfahrt
9th Overall Tour de Suisse
9th Subida a Urkiola
1994
1st Stage 3 Vuelta a Asturias
2nd GP Lugano
2nd Time trial, National Road Championships
1995
1st Overall Vuelta a Asturias

1st Stage 6

1st Trofeo Calvià
3rd Amstel Gold Race
3rd Wartenberg Rundfahrt
3rd Josef Voegeli Memorial
5th Overall Tour de Romandie

1st Stage 1

5th Overall Tour de Suisse
7th La Flèche Wallonne
9th Overall Tirreno–Adriatico
10th Rund um den Henninger Turm
1996
1st Rund um den Henninger Turm
1st Berner Rundfahrt
2nd Grand Prix Pino Cerami
3rd Giro della Provincia di Reggio Calabria
5th Overall GP Tell
7th Overall Tour de Romandie
10th Amstel Gold Race
1997
1st Subida a Urkiola
1st Coppa Placci
1st Giro del Mendrisiotto
1st Josef Voegeli Memorial
2nd Wartenberg Rundfahrt
3rd Overall Tirreno–Adriatico
3rd Overall Tour de Romandie
3rd Overall À travers Lausanne
3rd Amstel Gold Race
4th Trofeo Laigueglia
7th Liège–Bastogne–Liège
8th La Flèche Wallonne
9th Milano–Torino
10th Overall Tour de Suisse
1998
1st Overall Tour of Austria

1st Prologue

1st Road race, National Road Championships
1st Josef Voegeli Memorial
2nd Overall Tour de Suisse
6th Time trial, UCI Road World Championships
9th Overall Tour of the Basque Country
1999
2nd Overall Tour de Romandie
2nd Tour du Haut Var
2nd Classic Haribo
2nd Paris-Brussels
3rd Overall Vuelta a Murcia
4th Grand Prix des Nations
6th Overall Tour Méditerranéen
2000
4th Giro di Lombardia
10th Trofeo Melinda
2001
1st Stage 13 Vuelta a España
1st GP Winterthur
2nd GP Lugano
4th Overall Tour de Suisse
5th Overall Bayern Rundfahrt
6th Rund um den Henninger Turm
6th Giro di Lombardia
7th Overall Tour Méditerranéen
7th Coppa Ugo Agostoni
8th Overall Tirreno–Adriatico
10th GP Ouest–France
10th Road race, UCI Road World Championships
2002
1st Stage 1 Tour of the Basque Country
2003
1st Stage 2 Setmana Catalana de Ciclisme
4th Giro di Lombardia
7th Overall Vuelta a Murcia
7th Overall Sachsen Tour
8th Overall Tour Méditerranéen
8th Overall Route du Sud
2004
1st Stage 2 Setmana Catalana de Ciclisme
1st Stage 2 Tour of the Basque Country
7th GP Lugano
9th GP Chiasso
2005
7th Overall Tour de Suisse
2006
1st Grand Prix of Aargau Canton
2nd Overall Bayern Rundfahrt

1st Stage 4 (ITT)

2007
1st Road race, National Road Championships
4th Overall Tour de l'Ain

1st Points classification
1st Stage 1

7th Overall Rothaus Regio-Tour

=== Grand Tour general classification results timeline ===
Grand Tour	1994	1995	1996	1997	1998	1999	2000	2001	2002	2003	2004	2005	2006
Giro d'Italia	—	—	12	—	—	—	—	—	—	—	—	—	—
Tour de France	27	29	DNF	11	40	109	—	—	27	—	—	93	DNF
Vuelta a España	—	—	—	—	—	—	—	31	—	77	—	—	—

Legend
—	Did not compete
DNF	Did not finish
