= Wladimir Belli =

Italian cyclist

Personal information
- Full name: Wladimir Belli
- Born: 25 July 1970 (age 56) Sorengo, Switzerland

Cycling career
- Sport: Cycling
- Discipline: Road
- Role: Rider

Professional teams
- 1992–1996: Lampre–Colnago
- 1997: Brescialat–Oyster
- 1998–1999: Festina–Lotus
- 2000–2002: Fassa Bortolo
- 2003–2004: Lampre
- 2005: Domina Vacanze
- 2006–2007: Selle Italia–Diquigiovanni

Major wins
- Stage races Giro del Trentino (1996)

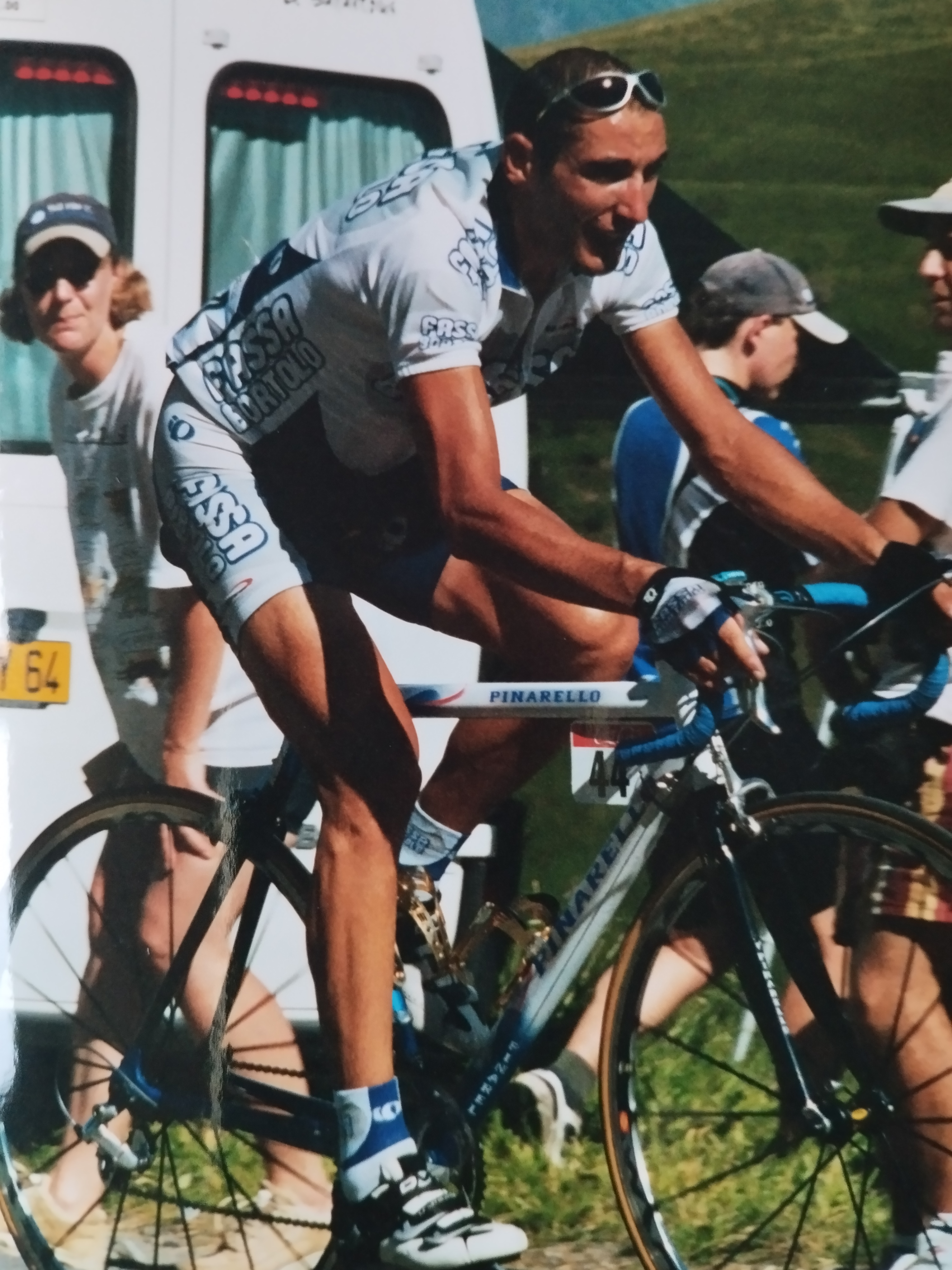
Wladimir Belli in the Tour de France 2001

Wladimir Belli (born 25 July 1970, in Sorengo) is an Italian former professional road bicycle racer. He was a professional between 1992 and 2007.

In the 2001 Giro d'Italia, Belli was sitting in third place overall entering the 14th stage of the race. After being verbally abused by a spectator, who later turned out to be a nephew of race leader Gilberto Simoni, Belli hit the man, an act for which he was disqualified from the race.

== Major results ==
1990
1st Overall Girobio
1st GP Capodarco
1991
2nd Giro del Belvedere
1993
2nd Overall Kellogg's Tour
3rd Trofeo Melinda
4th Overall Giro del Trentino
8th Overall Tour de Romandie
9th Coppa Ugo Agostoni
1994
3rd Gran Premio Industria e Commercio di Prato
4th Overall Volta a Catalunya
4th Milano–Torino
5th Giro dell'Emilia
6th Trofeo Laigueglia
1995
3rd Giro dell'Appennino
8th Giro dell'Emilia
9th Giro del Lazio
1996
1st Overall Giro del Trentino
1st Giro dell'Appennino
2nd Overall Vuelta a Murcia
3rd Overall Tour Méditerranéen
8th Overall Étoile de Bessèges
8th Trofeo Laigueglia
1997
2nd Overall Volta a Portugal

1st Stage 5

2nd Trofeo Melinda
5th Milano–Torino
6th Overall Giro d'Italia
6th Overall Four Days of Dunkirk
9th Giro di Lombardia
1998
3rd Overall Tour de Suisse
3rd Overall Volta a Portugal

1st Stage 6

4th Gran Premio Industria e Commercio di Prato
5th Giro dell'Emilia
5th Coppa Placci
6th Overall Giro del Trentino
7th Overall Volta a la Comunitat Valenciana
9th Coppa Sabatini
10th Overall Tour of the Basque Country
10th Trofeo Melinda
1999
1st Stage 3 (ITT) Grand Prix du Midi Libre
2nd Overall Tour of the Basque Country
2nd Overall Volta a la Comunitat Valenciana
3rd Overall Tour de Romandie
3rd Overall Critérium du Dauphiné Libéré

1st Mountains classification

3rd Overall Setmana Catalana de Ciclisme
3rd Overall Tour Méditerranéen
4th Trofeo Laigueglia
8th Overall Paris–Nice
9th Overall Tour de France
2000
1st Gran Premio Città di Camaiore
2nd Overall Settimana Internazionale di Coppi e Bartali
3rd Overall Tour de Suisse

1st Stage 3

4th Liège–Bastogne–Liège
7th Overall Giro d'Italia
7th Overall Volta a la Comunitat Valenciana
7th Giro di Lombardia
10th Overall Tour de Romandie
2001
3rd Overall Tour de Suisse
3rd Overall Tour de Romandie
4th Clásica de San Sebastián
6th Trofeo Melinda
7th Gran Premio Città di Camaiore
8th Giro di Lombardia
2002
4th Gran Premio Città di Camaiore
7th Overall Setmana Catalana de Ciclisme
2003
3rd Giro della Liguria
8th Overall Tour of the Basque Country
8th GP Miguel Induráin
2004
7th Overall Giro d'Italia
2006
6th Overall Vuelta por un Chile Líder

=== Grand Tour general classification results timeline ===
Grand Tour	1993	1994	1995	1996	1997	1998	1999	2000	2001	2002	2003	2004	2005	2006
Giro d'Italia	13	12	DNF	36	6	25	—	7	DSQ	DNF	11	7	24	DNF
Tour de France	—	—	DNF	68	—	—	9	—	24	45	—	—	—	—
/ Vuelta a España	—	—	—	—	DNF	—	DNF	12	—	—	DNF	—	—	—

Legend
—	Did not compete
DNF	Did not finish
DSQ	Disqualified
