= 2002 Tour du Haut Var =

Race details
- Dates: 23 February 2002
- Stages: 1
- Distance: 180 km (111.8 mi)
- Winning time: 4h 42' 50"

Results
	Winner	Laurent Jalabert (FRA)
	Second	Alexander Vinokourov (KAZ)
	Third	Robbie McEwen (AUS)

The 2002 Tour du Haut Var was the 34th edition of the Tour du Haut Var cycle race and was held on 23 February 2002. The race started and finished in Draguignan. The race was won by Laurent Jalabert.

== General classification ==
Final general classification

Rank	Rider	Time
1	Laurent Jalabert (FRA)	4h 42' 50"
2	Alexander Vinokourov (KAZ)	+ 0"
3	Robbie McEwen (AUS)	+ 23"
4	Daniele Nardello (ITA)	+ 23"
5	Raffaele Ferrara (ITA)	+ 23"
6	Davide Rebellin (ITA)	+ 23"
7	David Moncoutié (FRA)	+ 23"
8	Andrea Noè (ITA)	+ 23"
9	Alexander Bocharov (RUS)	+ 23"
10	Franck Bouyer (FRA)	+ 1' 08"
