= 1999 GP Miguel Induráin =

Race details
- Dates: 3 April 1999
- Stages: 1
- Distance: 198.2 km (123.2 mi)
- Winning time: 5h 38' 02"

Results
	Winner	Stefano Garzelli (ITA)
	Second	David Etxebarria (ESP)
	Third	Davide Rebellin (ITA)

The 1999 GP Miguel Induráin was the 46th edition of the GP Miguel Induráin cycle race and was held on 3 April 1999. The race started and finished in Estella. The race was won by Stefano Garzelli.

== General classification ==
Final general classification

Rank	Rider	Time
1	Stefano Garzelli (ITA)	5h 38' 02"
2	David Etxebarria (ESP)	+ 0"
3	Davide Rebellin (ITA)	+ 0"
4	Laurent Jalabert (FRA)	+ 0"
5	Marco Velo (ITA)	+ 0"
6	Txema del Olmo (ESP)	+ 18"
7	Daniel Atienza (ESP)	+ 18"
8	Bingen Fernández (ESP)	+ 18"
9	Ginés Salmerón (ESP)	+ 20"
10	Igor González de Galdeano (ESP)	+ 40"
