= Marco Velo =

Italian cyclist

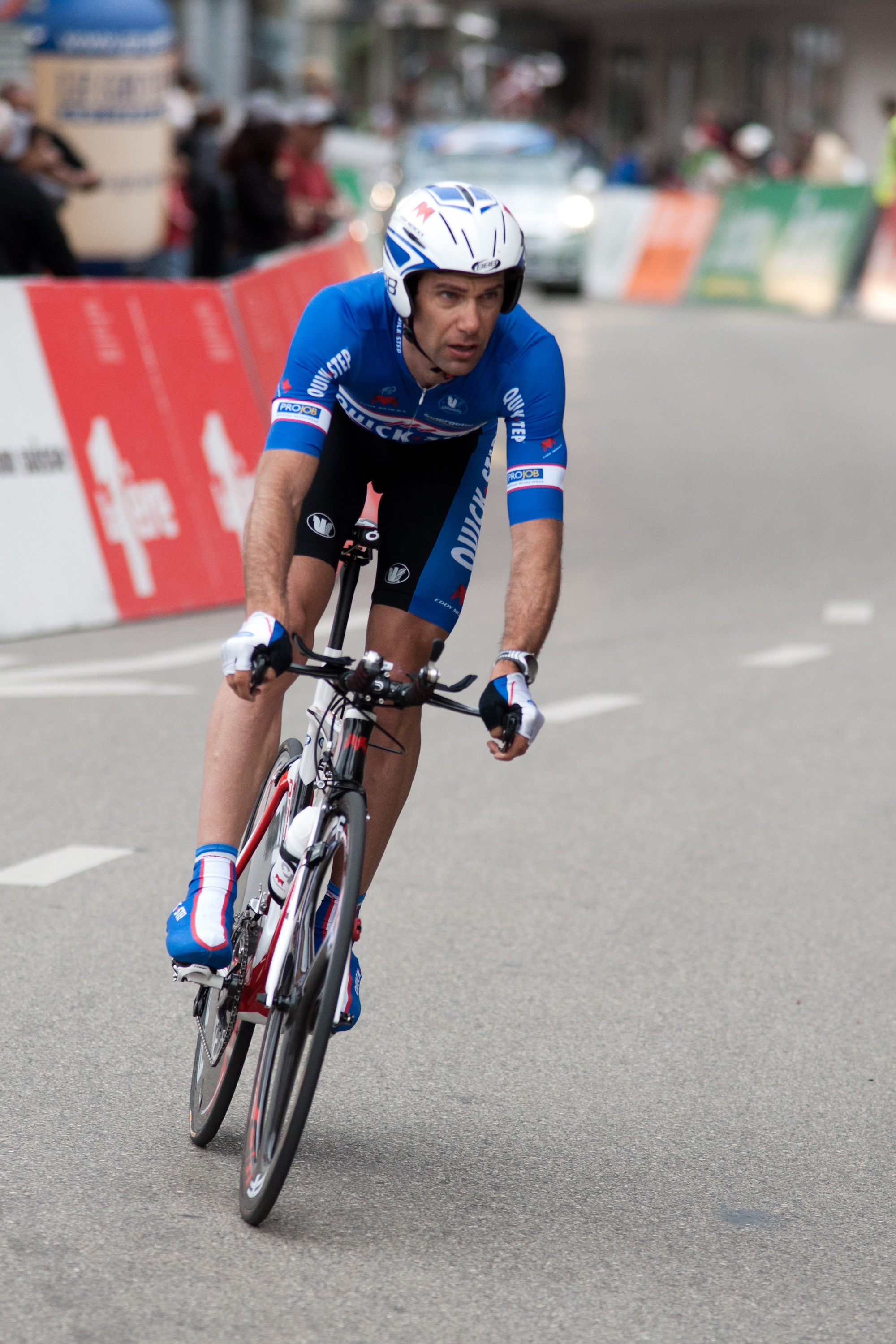
- Velo at the 2010 Tour de Romandie

Personal information
- Full name: Marco Velo
- Born: 9 March 1974 (age 52) Brescia, Italy
- Height: 1.84 m (6 ft 0 in)
- Weight: 70 kg (150 lb)

Cycling career
- Sport: Cycling
- Discipline: Road
- Role: Rider
- Rider type: Time trialist

Professional teams
- 1996–1997: Brescialat
- 1998–2001: Mercatone Uno–Bianchi
- 2002–2005: Fassa Bortolo
- 2006–2008: Team Milram
- 2009–2010: Quick-Step

Major wins
- One-day races and Classics National Time Trial Championships (1998, 1999, 2000)

Marco Velo (born 9 March 1974) is a retired Italian professional road bicycle racer.

== Professional career ==
Velo, who started his career with Brescialat, was seen as a talented time-trialist, winning the Italian National Time Trial Championship on three occasions—1998, 1999 and 2000. From 2002, Velo rode as a domestique for Alessandro Petacchi, first at Fassa Bortolo. In 2005, Velo wanted to join Matteo Tosatto at the Quick Step team, but in the end joined Petacchi at the Domina Vacanze team, but when that disbanded at the end of the year, they both moved to Milram at the start of 2006. For the 2008 season, Velo moved to join Tosatto at the Quick Step team.

== Major results ==
1997
1st Stage 4 Giro del Trentino
7th Overall Critérium International
8th Tour du Haut Var
1998
1st Time trial, National Road Championships
1st Overall Grand Prix Guillaume Tell

1st Stage 4b (ITT)

1st Firenze–Pistoia
4th Giro del Piemonte
6th Grand Prix des Nations
7th Trofeo Pantalica
1999
1st Time trial, National Road Championships
1st Gran Premio de Llodio
1st Firenze–Pistoia
2nd GP Industria & Commercio di Prato
2nd Giro della Provincia di Siracusa
5th GP Miguel Induráin
5th Trofeo Melinda
6th Japan Cup
7th La Flèche Wallonne
7th Klasika Primavera de Amorebieta
8th Giro di Lombardia
9th Coppa Placci
10th Amstel Gold Race
2000
1st Time trial, National Road Championships
3rd Overall Memorial Cecchi Gori
6th Overall Volta a la Comunitat Valenciana
9th Coppa Bernocchi
2001
~~1st Time trial, National Road Championships~~ (Note: Disqualified due to a doping infraction.)
2002
10th Grand Prix Eddy Merckx (with Serhiy Honchar)
2005
1st Stage 1b (TTT) Settimana Internazionale di Coppi e Bartali
3rd Giro di Toscana
6th Coppa Bernocchi
7th Trofeo Luis Puig
9th Giro della Provincia di Lucca
2006
1st Trofeo Città di Borgomanero (with Fabio Sacchi)

=== Grand Tour general classification results timeline ===
Grand Tour	1996	1997	1998	1999	2000	2001	2002	2003	2004	2005	2006	2007	2008	2009	2010
Giro d'Italia	81	30	20	DNF	DNF	11	—	21	100	103	—	—	87	—	108
Tour de France	—	—	—	—	39	—	54	DNF	DNF	—	97	—	42	—	—
/ Vuelta a España	—	—	—	—	—	—	57	—	114	DNF	118	117	—	93	—

Legend
—	Did not compete
DNF	Did not finish
