= 1996 Giro del Trentino =

Race details
- Dates: 8–12 May 1996
- Stages: 5
- Distance: 884 km (549.3 mi)
- Winning time: 22h 48' 19"

Results
	Winner	Wladimir Belli (ITA)
	Second	Enrico Zaina (ITA)
	Third	Nelson Rodríguez (COL)

The 1996 Giro del Trentino was the 20th edition of the Tour of the Alps cycle race and was held on 8 May to 12 May 1996. The race started in Arco di Trentino and finished in Trento. The race was won by Wladimir Belli.

== General classification ==
Final general classification

Rank	Rider	Time
1	Wladimir Belli (ITA)	22h 48' 19"
2	Enrico Zaina (ITA)	+ 4"
3	Nelson Rodríguez Serna (COL)	+ 4"
4	Georg Totschnig (AUT)	+ 4"
5	Gianni Faresin (ITA)	+ 31"
6	Rodolfo Massi (ITA)	+ 55"
7	Marco Zen (ITA)	+ 1' 08"
8	Stefano Faustini (ITA)	+ 1' 08"
9	Massimiliano Gentili (ITA)	+ 1' 31"
10	Riccardo Forconi (ITA)	+ 2' 10"
