= 1995 La Flèche Wallonne =

Race details
- Dates: 12 April 1995
- Stages: 1
- Distance: 205.5 km (127.7 mi)
- Winning time: 4h 51' 00"

Results
	Winner	Laurent Jalabert (FRA)	(ONCE)
	Second	Maurizio Fondriest (ITA)	(Lampre–Panaria)
	Third	Evgeni Berzin (RUS)	(Gewiss–Ballan)

The 1995 La Flèche Wallonne was the 59th edition of La Flèche Wallonne cycle race and was held on 12 April 1995. The race started in Spa and finished in Huy. The race was won by Laurent Jalabert of the ONCE team.

== General classification ==
Final general classification

Rank	Rider	Team	Time
1	Laurent Jalabert (FRA)	ONCE	4h 51' 00"
2	Maurizio Fondriest (ITA)	Lampre–Panaria	+ 2"
3	Evgeni Berzin (RUS)	Gewiss–Ballan	+ 26"
4	Francesco Casagrande (ITA)	Mercatone Uno–Saeco	+ 50"
5	Mauro Gianetti (SUI)	Polti–Granarolo–Santini	+ 50"
6	Davide Rebellin (ITA)	MG Maglificio–Technogym	+ 54"
7	Beat Zberg (SUI)	Carrera Jeans–Tassoni	+ 54"
8	Francesco Frattini (ITA)	Gewiss–Ballan	+ 57"
9	Heinz Imboden (SUI)	Refin	+ 57"
10	Steven Rooks (NED)	TVM–Polis Direct	+ 1' 03"
