= 1995 Amstel Gold Race =

Dutch cycling race

The 1995 Amstel Gold Race was the 30th edition of the annual Amstel Gold Race road bicycle race, held on Sunday April 22, 1995, in the Dutch province of Limburg. The race stretched 256 kilometres, with the start in Heerlen and the finish in Maastricht. There were a total of 192 competitors, with 56 cyclists finishing the race.

== Results ==
	Cyclist	Team	Time
1	Mauro Gianetti (SUI)	Polti–Granarolo–Santini	6h 38' 52"
2	Davide Cassani (ITA)	MG Maglificio–Technogym	s.t.
3	Beat Zberg (SUI)	Carrera Jeans–Tassoni	+ 27"
4	Olaf Ludwig (GER)	Team Telekom	s.t.
5	Jesper Skibby (DEN)	TVM–Polis Direct	s.t.
6	Alberto Elli (ITA)	MG Maglificio–Technogym	s.t.
7	Johan Museeuw (BEL)	Mapei–GB–Latexco	s.t.
8	Steven Rooks (NED)	TVM–Polis Direct	s.t.
9	Gianluca Bortolami (ITA)	Mapei–GB–Latexco	s.t.
10	Michele Bartoli (ITA)	Mercatone Uno–Saeco	s.t.
