= 1995 Volta a Catalunya =

Race details
- Dates: 15–22 June 1995
- Stages: 7 + Prologue
- Distance: 1,146.1 km (712.2 mi)
- Winning time: 29h 24' 54"

Results
	Winner	Laurent Jalabert (FRA)	(ONCE)
	Second	Melcior Mauri (ESP)	(ONCE)
	Third	Jesús Montoya (ESP)	(Banesto)
	Mountains	Pascal Hervé (FRA)	(Festina–Lotus)
	Sprints	Orlando Rodrigues (POR)	(Artiach–Chiquilin)
	Team	ONCE	

The 1995 Volta a Catalunya was the 75th edition of the Volta a Catalunya cycle race and was held from 15 June to 22 June 1995. The race started in Manlleu and finished in Olot. The race was won by Laurent Jalabert of the ONCE team.

== Teams ==
Sixteen teams of up to eight riders took part in the race:

- Carrera Jeans–Tassoni
- Mapei–GB–Latexco
- Lampre–Panaria
- ONCE
- Castorama
- Kelme–Sureña
- Lotto–Isoglass
- Banesto
- Festina–Lotus
- Artiach–Chiquilin
- GAN
- Castellblanch
- Santa Clara
- Equipo Euskadi
- Mercatone Uno–Saeco
- TVM–Polis Direct

== Route ==
Stage characteristics and winners
Stage	Date	Course	Distance	Type	Winner
P	21 June	Manlleu	3.1 km (1.9 mi)	Individual time trial	Maurizio Fondriest
1	22 June	Manlleu to Monestir de Montserrat	191 km (118.7 mi)	Hilly stage	Laurent Jalabert
2	23 June	Manresa to Port Torredembarra	172.4 km (107.1 mi)	Hilly stage	Mario Cipollini
3	24 June	Port Torredembarra to Barcelona	169.5 km (105.3 mi)	Hilly stage	Mario Cipollini
4	25 June	Bellver de Cerdanya to Boi Täull	226.8 km (140.9 mi)	Mountain stage	José María Jiménez
5	26 June	Vall de Boí to Lleida	163.3 km (101.5 mi)	Medium mountain stage	Mario Cipollini
6	27 June	Segura Viudas to Segura Viudas	21.6 km (13.4 mi)	Individual time trial	Melcior Mauri
7	28 June	Barcelona/Sarria to Olot	198.4 km (123.3 mi)	Medium mountain stage	Laurent Jalabert

== General classification ==
Final general classification

Rank	Rider	Team	Time
1	Laurent Jalabert (FRA)	ONCE	29h 24' 54"
2	Melcior Mauri (ESP)	ONCE	+ 46"
3	Jesús Montoya (ESP)	Banesto	+ 49"
4	Enrico Zaina (ITA)	Carrera Jeans–Tassoni	+ 1' 17"
5	Bo Hamburger (DEN)	TVM–Polis Direct	+ 1' 48"
6	Francisco Javier Mauleón (ESP)	Mapei–GB–Latexco	+ 1' 49"
7	Daniel Clavero (ESP)	Artiach–Chiquilin	+ 3' 04"
8	Stephen Hodge (AUS)	Festina–Lotus	+ 3' 23"
9	Juan Carlos Vicario (ESP)	Castellblanch	+ 6' 11"
10	José María Jiménez (ESP)	Banesto	+ 6' 22"
