= 1993 Giro del Trentino =

Race details
- Dates: 11–14 May 1993
- Stages: 4
- Distance: 695 km (431.9 mi)
- Winning time: 18h 13' 36"

Results
| | Winner | Maurizio Fondriest (ITA) |
| | Second | Claudio Chiappucci (ITA) |
| | Third | Leonardo Sierra (VEN) |

The 1993 Giro del Trentino was the 17th edition of the Tour of the Alps cycle race and was held on 11 May to 14 May 1993. The race started in Riva del Garda and finished in Arco di Trento. The race was won by Maurizio Fondriest.

== General classification ==
Final general classification

| Rank | Rider | Time |
|---|---|---|
| 1 | Maurizio Fondriest (ITA) | 18h 31' 49" |
| 2 | Claudio Chiappucci (ITA) | + 11" |
| 3 | Leonardo Sierra (VEN) | + 38" |
| 4 | Wladimir Belli (ITA) | + 50" |
| 5 | Marco Pantani (ITA) | + 54" |
| 6 | Francesco Casagrande (ITA) | + 1' 00" |
| 7 | Zenon Jaskuła (POL) | + 1' 18" |
| 8 | Nelson Rodríguez Serna (COL) | + 1' 26" |
| 9 | Stefano Della Santa (ITA) | + 1' 34" |
| 10 | Vladimir Poulnikov (UKR) | + 1' 42" |
