= 1998 Giro del Trentino =

Race details
- Dates: 27–30 April 1998
- Stages: 4
- Distance: 687.7 km (427.3 mi)
- Winning time: 17h 29' 45"

Results
| | Winner | Paolo Savoldelli (ITA) |
| | Second | Dario Frigo (ITA) |
| | Third | Francesco Casagrande (ITA) |

The 1998 Giro del Trentino was the 22nd edition of the Tour of the Alps cycle race and was held on 27 April to 30 April 1998. The race started in Arco and finished in Riva del Garda. The race was won by Paolo Savoldelli.

== General classification ==
Final general classification

| Rank | Rider | Time |
|---|---|---|
| 1 | Paolo Savoldelli (ITA) | 17h 29' 45" |
| 2 | Dario Frigo (ITA) | + 24" |
| 3 | Francesco Casagrande (ITA) | + 26" |
| 4 | Marco Pantani (ITA) | + 27" |
| 5 | Daniel Clavero (ESP) | + 33" |
| 6 | Wladimir Belli (ITA) | + 33" |
| 7 | Alexandr Shefer (KAZ) | + 33" |
| 8 | Enrico Zaina (ITA) | + 1' 50" |
| 9 | Giuseppe Guerini (ITA) | + 2' 19" |
| 10 | Pascal Richard (SUI) | + 2' 22" |
