= 1999 Tour of the Basque Country =

Race details
- Dates: 5–9 April 1999
- Stages: 5
- Distance: 838.7 km (521.1 mi)
- Winning time: 21h 36' 11"

Results
| | Winner | Laurent Jalabert (FRA) | (ONCE–Deutsche Bank) |
| | Second | Wladimir Belli (ITA) | (Festina–Lotus) |
| | Third | Davide Rebellin (ITA) | (Team Polti) |

The 1999 Tour of the Basque Country (Spanish: Vuelta Ciclista al País Vasco) was the 39th edition of the Tour of the Basque Country cycle race and was held from 5 April to 9 April 1999. The race started in Tolosa and finished at Aia. The race was won by Laurent Jalabert of the ONCE team.

== General classification ==
Final general classification

| Rank | Rider | Team | Time |
|---|---|---|---|
| 1 | Laurent Jalabert (FRA) | ONCE–Deutsche Bank | 21h 36' 11" |
| 2 | Wladimir Belli (ITA) | Festina–Lotus | + 51" |
| 3 | Davide Rebellin (ITA) | Team Polti | + 1' 01" |
| 4 | Mario Aerts (BEL) | Lotto–Mobistar | + 1' 06" |
| 5 | Peter Luttenberger (AUT) | ONCE–Deutsche Bank | + 1' 09" |
| 6 | David Etxebarria (ESP) | ONCE–Deutsche Bank | + 1' 16" |
| 7 | Niki Aebersold (SUI) | Rabobank | + 1' 27" |
| 8 | Marco Pantani (ITA) | Mercatone Uno–Bianchi | + 1' 29" |
| 9 | Juan Carlos Domínguez (ESP) | Vitalicio Seguros | + 1' 38" |
| 10 | Udo Bölts (GER) | Team Telekom | + 1' 43" |
