= 1997 La Flèche Wallonne =

Race details
- Dates: 16 April 1997
- Stages: 1
- Distance: 200.5 km (124.6 mi)
- Winning time: 5h 07' 00"

Results
	Winner	Laurent Jalabert (FRA)	(ONCE)
	Second	Luc Leblanc (FRA)	(Team Polti)
	Third	Alex Zülle (SUI)	(ONCE)

The 1997 La Flèche Wallonne was the 61st edition of La Flèche Wallonne cycle race and was held on 16 April 1997. The race started in Spa and finished in Huy. The race was won by Laurent Jalabert of the ONCE team.

== General classification ==
Final general classification

Rank	Rider	Team	Time
1	Laurent Jalabert (FRA)	ONCE	5h 07' 00"
2	Luc Leblanc (FRA)	Team Polti	+ 19"
3	Alex Zülle (SUI)	ONCE	+ 50"
4	Michele Bartoli (ITA)	MG Maglificio–Technogym	+ 50"
5	Marco Pantani (ITA)	Mercatone Uno	+ 50"
6	Pascal Lino (FRA)	BigMat–Auber 93	+ 50"
7	Andrea Noè (ITA)	Asics–CGA	+ 50"
8	Beat Zberg (SUI)	Mercatone Uno	+ 50"
9	Benoît Salmon (FRA)	Lotto–Mobistar–Isoglass	+ 50"
10	Richard Virenque (FRA)	Festina–Lotus	+ 50"
