= 1996 Omloop Het Volk =

Race details
- Dates: 2 March 1996
- Stages: 1
- Distance: 205 km (127 mi)
- Winning time: 5h 06' 00"

Results
	Winner	Tom Steels (BEL)
	Second	Hendrik Redant (BEL)
	Third	Olaf Ludwig (GER)

The 1996 Omloop Het Volk was the 50th edition of the Omloop Het Volk cycle race and was held on 2 March 1996. The race started in Ghent and finished in Lokeren. The race was won by Tom Steels.

== General classification ==
Final general classification
Rank	Rider	Time
1	Tom Steels (BEL)	5h 06' 00"
2	Hendrik Redant (BEL)	+ 0"
3	Olaf Ludwig (GER)	+ 0"
4	Herman Frison (BEL)	+ 0"
5	Edwig Van Hooydonck (BEL)	+ 0"
6	Wilfried Peeters (BEL)	+ 16"
7	Ludo Dierckxsens (BEL)	+ 18"
8	Jelle Nijdam (NED)	+ 45"
9	Johan Capiot (BEL)	+ 45"
10	Gianluca Pianegonda (ITA)	+ 45"
