= 2002 Clásica de San Sebastián =

Race details
- Dates: 10 August 2002
- Stages: 1
- Distance: 227 km (141.1 mi)
- Winning time: 5h 47' 29"

Results
	Winner	Laurent Jalabert (FRA)	(CSC–Tiscali)
	Second	Igor Astarloa (ESP)	(Saeco–Longoni Sport)
	Third	Gabriele Missaglia (ITA)	(Lampre–Daikin)

The 2002 Clásica de San Sebastián was the 22nd edition of the Clásica de San Sebastián cycle race and was held on 10 August 2002. The race started and finished in San Sebastián. The race was won by Laurent Jalabert of the CSC team.

== General classification ==
Final general classification

Rank	Rider	Team	Time
1	Laurent Jalabert (FRA)	CSC–Tiscali	5h 47' 29"
2	Igor Astarloa (ESP)	Saeco–Longoni Sport	+ 0"
3	Gabriele Missaglia (ITA)	Lampre–Daikin	+ 0"
4	Andrey Kivilev (KAZ)	Cofidis	+ 0"
5	Dario Frigo (ITA)	Tacconi Sport	+ 0"
6	Danilo Di Luca (ITA)	Saeco–Longoni Sport	+ 35"
7	Paolo Bettini (ITA)	Mapei–Quick-Step	+ 35"
8	Nico Mattan (BEL)	Cofidis	+ 35"
9	Laurent Dufaux (SUI)	Alessio	+ 35"
10	Gennady Mikhaylov (RUS)	Lotto–Adecco	+ 41"
