= 1996 E3 Prijs Vlaanderen =

1996 E3 Harelbeke
Race details
- Dates: 30 March 1996
- Stages: 1
- Distance: 206 km (128 mi)
- Winning time: 5h 10' 44"

Results
	Winner	Carlo Bomans (BEL)	(Mapei–GB)
	Second	Peter Van Petegem (BEL)	(TVM–Farm Frites)
	Third	Wilfried Nelissen (BEL)	(Lotto)

The 1996 E3 Harelbeke was the 39th edition of the E3 Harelbeke cycle race and was held on 30 March 1996. The race started and finished in Harelbeke. The race was won by Carlo Bomans of the Mapei team.

== General classification ==
Final general classification

Rank	Rider	Team	Time
1	Carlo Bomans (BEL)	Mapei–GB	5h 10' 44"
2	Peter Van Petegem (BEL)	TVM–Farm Frites	+ 23"
3	Wilfried Nelissen (BEL)	Lotto	+ 29"
4	Viatcheslav Ekimov (RUS)	Rabobank	+ 34"
5	Olaf Ludwig (GER)	Team Telekom	+ 34"
6	Johan Museeuw (BEL)	Mapei–GB	+ 34"
7	Tristan Hoffman (NED)	TVM–Farm Frites	+ 34"
8	Lance Armstrong (USA)	Motorola	+ 34"
9	Andrei Tchmil (BEL)	Lotto	+ 34"
10	Massimo Strazzer (ITA)	Brescialat	+ 34"
