= 1997 Paris–Nice =

Race details
- Dates: 9–16 March 1997
- Stages: 7 + Prologue
- Distance: 1,137.3 km (706.7 mi)
- Winning time: 28h 56' 06"

Results
Jersey awarded to the overall winner	Winner	Laurent Jalabert (FRA)	(ONCE)
	Second	Laurent Dufaux (SUI)	(Festina–Lotus)
	Third	Santiago Blanco (ESP)	(Banesto)

The 1997 Paris–Nice was the 55th edition of the Paris–Nice cycle race and was held from 9 March to 16 March 1997. The race started in Neuilly-sur-Seine and finished in Nice. The race was won by Laurent Jalabert of the ONCE team.

== Route ==
Stage characteristics and winners
Stage	Date	Course	Distance	Type	Winner
1	9 March	Neuilly-sur-Seine to Paris	7.1 km (4.4 mi)	Individual time trial	Laurent Jalabert (FRA)
2	10 March	Vendôme to Bourges	162.5 km (101.0 mi)		Tom Steels (BEL)
3	11 March	Bourges to Montluçon	173 km (107 mi)		Tom Steels (BEL)
4	12 March	Montluçon to Clermont-Ferrand	165 km (103 mi)		Pascal Chanteur (FRA)
5	13 March	Cournon-d'Auvergne to Vénissieux	197.5 km (122.7 mi)		Tom Steels (BEL)
6	14 March	Montélimar to Sisteron	182 km (113 mi)		Laurent Jalabert (FRA)
7	15 March	Saint-André-les-Alpes to Antibes	160.5 km (99.7 mi)		Adriano Baffi (ITA)
8a	16 March	Nice to Nice	69.8 km (43.4 mi)		Tom Steels (BEL)
8b	16 March	Antibes to Nice	19.9 km (12.4 mi)	Individual time trial	Viatcheslav Ekimov (RUS)

== General classification ==
Final general classification

Rank	Rider	Team	Time
1	Laurent Jalabert (FRA)	ONCE	28h 56' 06"
2	Laurent Dufaux (SUI)	Festina–Lotus	+ 1' 00"
3	Santiago Blanco (ESP)	Banesto	+ 1' 25"
4	Viatcheslav Ekimov (RUS)	U.S. Postal Service	+ 1' 45"
5	Pascal Chanteur (FRA)	Casino	+ 2' 06"
6	Didier Rous (FRA)	Festina–Lotus	+ 2' 32"
7	Mikel Zarrabeitia (ESP)	ONCE	+ 2' 39"
8	Johan Museeuw (BEL)	Mapei–GB	+ 2' 43"
9	Christophe Moreau (FRA)	Festina–Lotus	+ 2' 51"
10	Pascal Lino (FRA)	BigMat–Auber 93	+ 2' 55"
