= 1999 Omloop Het Volk =

Race details
- Dates: 27 February 1999
- Stages: 1
- Distance: 202 km (126 mi)
- Winning time: 5h 12' 00"

Results
	Winner	Frank Vandenbroucke (BEL)
	Second	Wilfried Peeters (BEL)
	Third	Tom Steels (BEL)

The 1999 Omloop Het Volk was the 53rd edition of the Omloop Het Volk cycle race and was held on 27 February 1999. The race started in Ghent and finished in Lokeren. The race was won by Frank Vandenbroucke.

== General classification ==
Final general classification
Rank	Rider	Time
1	Frank Vandenbroucke (BEL)	5h 12' 00"
2	Wilfried Peeters (BEL)	+ 0"
3	Tom Steels (BEL)	+ 34"
4	Andrei Tchmil (BEL)	+ 34"
5	Jo Planckaert (BEL)	+ 34"
6	Johan Museeuw (BEL)	+ 34"
7	Servais Knaven (NED)	+ 34"
8	Peter Van Petegem (BEL)	+ 34"
9	Wim Feys (BEL)	+ 35"
10	Chris Peers (BEL)	+ 1' 44"
