= 1996 Tour de Romandie =

Race details
- Dates: 6–12 May 1996
- Stages: 6 + Prologue
- Distance: 995.4 km (618.5 mi)
- Winning time: 25h 53' 05"

Results
	Winner	Abraham Olano (ESP)	(Mapei–GB)
	Second	Alexander Gontchenkov (UKR)	(Roslotto–ZG Mobili)
	Third	Giuseppe Guerini (ITA)	(Team Polti)

The 1996 Tour de Romandie was the 50th edition of the Tour de Romandie cycle race and was held from 6 May to 12 May 1996. The race started in Basel and finished in Geneva. The race was won by Abraham Olano of the Mapei team.

== General classification ==
Final general classification
Rank	Rider	Team	Time
1	Abraham Olano (ESP)	Mapei–GB	25h 53' 05"
2	Alexander Gontchenkov (UKR)	Roslotto–ZG Mobili	+ 1' 18"
3	Giuseppe Guerini (ITA)	Team Polti	+ 1' 25"
4	Davide Rebellin (ITA)	Team Polti	+ 1' 36"
5	Mauro Gianetti (SUI)	Team Polti	+ 2' 05"
6	Evgeni Berzin (RUS)	Gewiss Playbus	+ 2' 39"
7	Beat Zberg (SUI)	Carrera Jeans–Tassoni	+ 3' 22"
8	Piotr Ugrumov (LAT)	Roslotto–ZG Mobili	+ 3' 53"
9	Andrea Noè (ITA)	Mapei–GB	+ 4' 21"
10	Manuel Beltrán (ESP)	Mapei–GB	+ 4' 52"
