= 1996 La Flèche Wallonne =

Race details
- Dates: 17 April 1996
- Stages: 1
- Distance: 200.5 km (124.6 mi)
- Winning time: 4h 40' 00"

Results
	Winner	Lance Armstrong (USA)	(Motorola)
	Second	Didier Rous (FRA)	(GAN)
	Third	Maurizio Fondriest (ITA)	(Roslotto–ZG Mobili)

The 1996 La Flèche Wallonne was the 60th edition of La Flèche Wallonne cycle race and was held on 17 April 1996. The race started in Spa and finished in Huy. The race was won by Lance Armstrong of the Motorola team.

== General classification ==
Final general classification

Rank	Rider	Team	Time
1	Lance Armstrong (USA)	Motorola	4h 40' 00"
2	Didier Rous (FRA)	GAN	+ 8"
3	Maurizio Fondriest (ITA)	Roslotto–ZG Mobili	+ 54"
4	Mauro Gianetti (SUI)	Team Polti	+ 1' 00"
5	Gabriele Colombo (ITA)	Gewiss Playbus	+ 1' 08"
6	Enrico Zaina (ITA)	Carrera Jeans–Tassoni	+ 1' 13"
7	Alexander Gontchenkov (UKR)	Roslotto–ZG Mobili	+ 1' 21"
8	Laurent Brochard (FRA)	Festina–Lotus	+ 1' 42"
9	Stéphane Heulot (FRA)	GAN	+ 1' 50"
10	Davide Rebellin (ITA)	Team Polti	+ 1' 50"
