= 1999 Tour de Romandie =

Race details
- Dates: 4–9 May 1999
- Stages: 5 + Prologue
- Distance: 763.7 km (474.5 mi)
- Winning time: 19h 23' 31"

Results
	Winner	Laurent Jalabert (FRA)	(ONCE–Deutsche Bank)
	Second	Beat Zberg (SUI)	(Rabobank)
	Third	Wladimir Belli (ITA)	(Festina–Lotus)

The 1999 Tour de Romandie was the 53rd edition of the Tour de Romandie cycle race and was held from 4 May to 9 May 1999. The race started in Bernex and finished in Geneva. The race was won by Laurent Jalabert of the ONCE team.

== General classification ==
Final general classification
Rank	Rider	Team	Time
1	Laurent Jalabert (FRA)	ONCE–Deutsche Bank	19h 23' 31"
2	Beat Zberg (SUI)	Rabobank	+ 44"
3	Wladimir Belli (ITA)	Festina–Lotus	+ 1' 09"
4	Paolo Savoldelli (ITA)	Saeco–Cannondale	+ 1' 20"
5	Oscar Camenzind (SUI)	Lampre–Daikin	+ 1' 50"
6	Andrea Noè (ITA)	Mapei–Quick-Step	+ 2' 09"
7	Óscar Sevilla (ESP)	Kelme–Costa Blanca	+ 2' 11"
8	Leonardo Piepoli (ITA)	Banesto	+ 2' 44"
9	Markus Zberg (SUI)	Rabobank	+ 3' 48"
10	Gabriele Missaglia (ITA)	Lampre–Daikin	+ 4' 03"
