= 2001 Clásica de San Sebastián =

Race details
- Dates: 11 August 2001
- Stages: 1
- Distance: 228 km (141.7 mi)
- Winning time: 5h 17' 54"

Results
| | Winner | Laurent Jalabert (FRA) | (CSC–Tiscali) |
| | Second | Francesco Casagrande (ITA) | (Fassa Bortolo) |
| | Third | Davide Rebellin (ITA) | (Liquigas–Pata) |

The 2001 Clásica de San Sebastián was the 21st edition of the Clásica de San Sebastián cycle race and was held on 11 August 2001. The race started and finished in San Sebastián. The race was won by Laurent Jalabert of the CSC team.

== General classification ==
Final general classification

| Rank | Rider | Team | Time |
|---|---|---|---|
| 1 | Laurent Jalabert (FRA) | CSC–Tiscali | 5h 17' 54" |
| 2 | Francesco Casagrande (ITA) | Fassa Bortolo | + 0" |
| 3 | Davide Rebellin (ITA) | Liquigas–Pata | + 0" |
| 4 | Wladimir Belli (ITA) | Fassa Bortolo | + 0" |
| 5 | Serge Baguet (BEL) | Lotto–Adecco | + 26" |
| 6 | Stefano Garzelli (ITA) | Mapei–Quick-Step | + 34" |
| 7 | Piotr Wadecki (POL) | Domo–Farm Frites–Latexco | + 34" |
| 8 | Andrea Ferrigato (ITA) | Alessio | + 34" |
| 9 | Erik Dekker (NED) | Rabobank | + 34" |
| 10 | Javier Pascual Llorente (ESP) | Kelme–Costa Blanca | + 34" |
