= 1997 Giro di Lombardia =

Race details
- Dates: 18 October 1997
- Stages: 1
- Distance: 250 km (155.3 mi)
- Winning time: 5h 48' 44"

Results
	Winner	Laurent Jalabert (FRA)	(ONCE)
	Second	Paolo Lanfranchi (ITA)	(Mapei–GB)
	Third	Francesco Casagrande (ITA)	(Saeco–Estro)

The 1997 Giro di Lombardia was the 91st edition of the Giro di Lombardia cycle race and was held on 18 October 1997. The race started in Varese and finished in Bergamo. The race was won by Laurent Jalabert of the ONCE team.

== General classification ==
Final general classification

Rank	Rider	Team	Time
1	Laurent Jalabert (FRA)	ONCE	5h 48' 44"
2	Paolo Lanfranchi (ITA)	Mapei–GB	+ 0"
3	Francesco Casagrande (ITA)	Saeco–Estro	+ 0"
4	Michele Bartoli (ITA)	MG Maglificio–Technogym	+ 3"
5	Paolo Valoti (ITA)	Cantina Tollo–Carrier–Starplast	+ 1' 07"
6	Axel Merckx (BEL)	Team Polti	+ 1' 30"
7	Andrea Tafi (ITA)	Mapei–GB	+ 1' 31"
8	Davide Rebellin (ITA)	Française des Jeux	+ 1' 32"
9	Wladimir Belli (ITA)	Brescialat–Oyster	+ 2' 21"
10	Alessandro Bertolini (ITA)	MG Maglificio–Technogym	+ 2' 21"
