= 1996 Paris–Nice =

Race details
- Dates: 10–17 March 1996
- Stages: 8
- Distance: 1,325.7 km (823.8 mi)
- Winning time: 34h 28' 14"

Results
Jersey awarded to the overall winner	Winner	Laurent Jalabert (FRA)	(ONCE)
	Second	Lance Armstrong (USA)	(Motorola)
	Third	Chris Boardman (GBR)	(GAN)

The 1996 Paris–Nice was the 54th edition of the Paris–Nice cycle race and was held from 10 March to 17 March 1996. The race started in Châteauroux and finished in Nice. The race was won by Laurent Jalabert of the ONCE team.

== Route ==
Stage characteristics and winners
Stage	Date	Course	Distance	Type	Winner
1	10 March	Châteauroux to Saint-Amand-Montrond	178 km (111 mi)		Frédéric Moncassin (FRA)
2	11 March	Dun-sur-Auron to Aubusson	160.8 km (99.9 mi)		Wilfried Nelissen (BEL)
3	12 March	Vassivière-en-Limousin to Chalvignac	172.5 km (107.2 mi)		Laurent Jalabert (FRA)
4	13 March	Maurs-la-Jolie to Millau	162.6 km (101.0 mi)		Laurent Jalabert (FRA)
5	14 March	Millau to Millau	162.6 km (101.0 mi)		Stefano Casagranda (ITA)
6	15 March	Vitrolles to Saint-Tropez	199.5 km (124.0 mi)		Andrei Tchmil (UKR)
7	16 March	Saint-Tropez to Juan-les-Pins	193.7 km (120.4 mi)		Bruno Boscardin (ITA)
8a	17 March	Nice to Nice	71.7 km (44.6 mi)		Max Sciandri (GBR)
8b	17 March	Juan-les-Pins to Nice	19.9 km (12.4 mi)	Individual time trial	Chris Boardman (GBR)

== General classification ==
Final general classification

Rank	Rider	Team	Time
1	Laurent Jalabert (FRA)	ONCE	34h 28' 14"
2	Lance Armstrong (USA)	Motorola	+ 43"
3	Chris Boardman (GBR)	GAN	+ 47"
4	Frank Vandenbroucke (BEL)	Mapei–GB	+ 1' 21"
5	Laurent Brochard (FRA)	Festina–Lotus	+ 1' 36"
6	Íñigo Cuesta (ESP)	ONCE	+ 2' 17"
7	Luc Leblanc (FRA)	Team Polti	+ 2' 18"
8	Andrei Tchmil (UKR)	Lotto	+ 2' 48"
9	Laurent Madouas (FRA)	Motorola	+ 3' 17"
10	Andrea Peron (ITA)	Motorola	+ 3' 31"
