= 1996 Paris–Tours =

Race details
- Dates: 6 October 1996
- Stages: 1
- Distance: 253 km (157.2 mi)
- Winning time: 5h 38' 55"

Results
	Winner	Nicola Minali (ITA)	(Gewiss Playbus)
	Second	Tom Steels (BEL)	(Mapei–GB)
	Third	Giovanni Lombardi (ITA)	(Team Polti)

The 1996 Paris–Tours was the 90th edition of the Paris–Tours cycle race and was held on 6 October 1996. The race started in Paris and finished in Tours. The race was won by Nicola Minali of the Gewiss team.

== General classification ==
Final general classification

Rank	Rider	Team	Time
1	Nicola Minali (ITA)	Gewiss Playbus	5h 38' 55"
2	Tom Steels (BEL)	Mapei–GB	+ 0"
3	Giovanni Lombardi (ITA)	Team Polti	+ 0"
4	Tristan Hoffman (NED)	Mapei–GB	+ 0"
5	Laurent Jalabert (FRA)	ONCE	+ 0"
6	Michele Bartoli (ITA)	MG Maglificio–Technogym	+ 0"
7	Andrea Ferrigato (ITA)	Roslotto–ZG Mobili	+ 0"
8	Pascal Chanteur (FRA)	Petit Casino	+ 0"
9	Giuseppe Citterio (ITA)	Aki–Gipiemme	+ 0"
10	Lars Michaelsen (DEN)	Festina–Lotus	+ 0"
