= 2002 Milan–San Remo =

Race details
- Dates: March 23
- Stages: 1
- Distance: 287 km (178 mi)
- Winning time: 6h 39' 29"

Results
	Winner	Mario Cipollini (ITA)	(Acqua & Sapone–Cantina Tollo)
	Second	Fred Rodriguez (USA)	(Domo–Farm Frites)
	Third	Marcus Zberg (SUI)	(Rabobank)

The 2002 Milan–San Remo was the 93rd edition of the monument classic Milan–San Remo and was won by Italian Mario Cipollini of Acqua & Sapone-Acqua & Sapone–Cantina Tollo. The race was run on March 23, 2002 and the 287 kilometres (178 mi) were covered in 6 hours, 39 minutes and 29 seconds.

== Results ==
	Cyclist	Team	Time
1	Mario Cipollini (ITA)	Acqua & Sapone–Cantina Tollo	6h 39' 29"
2	Fred Rodriguez (USA)	Domo–Farm Frites	s.t.
3	Markus Zberg (SUI)	Rabobank	s.t.
4	Jo Planckaert (BEL)	Cofidis	s.t.
5	Óscar Freire (ESP)	Mapei–Quick-Step	s.t.
6	Tomáš Konečný (CZE)	Domo–Farm Frites	s.t.
7	Andrei Tchmil (BEL)	Lotto–Adecco	s.t.
8	Ján Svorada (CZE)	Lampre–Daikin	s.t.
9	Paolo Bossoni (ITA)	Tacconi Sport	s.t.
10	Mario Manzoni (ITA)	Index–Alexia Alluminio	s.t.
