= Gewiss–Ballan =

Team information
- UCI code: GEW
- Registered: Italy
- Founded: 1993
- Disbanded: 1997
- Disciplines: Road; Track
- Status: Retired

Key personnel
- General manager: Emanuele Bombini

Team name history
- 1993 1994–1995 1996 1997: Mecair-Ballan; Gewiss–Ballan; Gewiss Playbus; Batik–Del Monte

Gewiss–Ballan was an Italian-based road bicycle racing team active from 1993 to 1997, named after the Italian electrical engineering company Gewiss. The team was successful in the Giro d'Italia and the Tour de France as well as several classics during the early 1990s.

== History ==
The team originated as a new project, Mecair–Ballan, in January 1993, with Mecair and the Italian garage-door manufacturer Ballan as sponsors. The Italian electrical engineering company Gewiss replaced Mecair as title sponsor in 1994. Gewiss had previously sponsored the earlier Gewiss–Bianchi team from 1987 to 1989.

The 1993 Team Mecair-Ballan was supplied by Rossin Bikes.

In 1996 the second sponsor was taken by the Gewiss brand Playbus. Directeur sportifs with the team included Emanuele Bombini and Paolo Rosola. In the four years of its existence, the team achieved great successes.

The team produced winners of the Giro d'Italia – Evgeni Berzin and Ivan Gotti as well as top classic specialists Giorgio Furlan and Nicola Minali. Former World Champion Moreno Argentin finished his career with the team on a high note with stage wins at the 1993 Giro d'Italia as well as the impressive win at La Flèche Wallonne in 1994. The team dominated cycling during the 1994 season with Giorgio Furlan winning Tirreno–Adriatico (and Berzin second overall) and Furlan winning Milan–San Remo. Berzin then won Liège–Bastogne–Liège which was followed by Argentin's win in La Flèche Wallonne. The win in the Flèche Wallonne was impressive because the team completely dominated the race with taking all podium places at the race with Argentin, Furlan and Berzin ahead of many greats of cycling at the time including Claudio Chiappucci, Franco Ballerini, Davide Cassani and Gianni Bugno.

After the Flèche Wallonne of 1994, French sports newspaper L'Équipe interviewed the team's doctor Michele Ferrari. Journalist Jean-Michel Rouet asked Ferrari if his riders used EPO to which Ferrari denied prescribing the drug but said he would not find it wrong, saying that it was not dangerous and compared taking EPO to drinking orange juice. This remark generated controversy and Ferrari later stepped down as team doctor.

Afterwards Berzin won the 1994 Giro d'Italia while Piotr Ugrumov came second overall in 1994 Tour de France. Vladislav Bobrik won the Giro di Lombardia in the late season for the team.

In the following year, the team was not as dominant but still successful. Berzin came second at the 1995 Giro d'Italia behind Tony Rominger and ahead of his teammate Ugrumov. The team set the record speed of the team time trial at the 1995 Tour de France of 54.930 km/h. This speed stood for ten years until Lance Armstrong's Discovery Channel Team broke it during the 2005 Tour de France. The Gewiss team beat Laurent Jalabert's Team ONCE to second place and the defending champion Miguel Induráin's Banesto to third place. Riis would wear the yellow jersey as leader of the general classification in that year's Tour before eventually finishing third overall.

== Doping ==
=== Systematic doping ===
The team is well known due to systematic doping that occurred with the team. The team doctor, Michele Ferrari was an assistant of Professor Francesco Concóni at the Biomedical Institute at the University of Ferrara in Italy. Concóni together with his assistants is said to have introduced erythropoietin (EPO) to the sport of cycling.

On 11 January 1999 Danmarks Radio aired The Price of Silence in Denmark, the first of a three part series that detailed doping in cycling of the Team ONCE and Gewiss teams. The programme alleged that EPO was used by the Gewiss–Ballan team in 1995. The journalists had come into possession of papers of hematocrit levels of riders of the team which showed large fluctuations from normal levels to those indicating doping. These figures would later be published in L’Equipe (discussed below). In addition the documentary told of how during the Tour of Denmark on 4 August 1995 journalists made a doping find in a hotel room where the soigneur of Gewiss Paolo Ganzerli had slept the night before. Six riders of the team had also stayed in the hotel on that night of 3 August 1995. The journalists found a Gewiss bag filled with 12 used and bloodied needles, an ampule which according to its label contained Recomon 5000 (EPO) and three blank ampules of which subsequent tests revealed contained EPO.

Further revelations about systematic doping on the team were published in the Italian newspaper La Repubblica and the French sports paper L'Équipe in 1999. These were based on published writing from journalist Eugenio Capodacqua from the Italian daily newspaper La Repubblica. Capodacqua published blood values (hematocrit levels) from Gewiss riders and results of an investigation into the team and its doctor Michele Ferrari. On 12 March 1999 L'Équipe published a table of hematocrit levels of Gewiss riders that were taken from December 1994 to May 1995. This was before the UCI limit of a hematocrit level of 50% which came into effect in 1997. Bjarne Riis rode for the team at the time and his levels went from 41.1 to 56.3, Gotti from 40.7 to 57 and Berzin from 41.7 to 53. Ugrumov had the highest level at 60%. Riis immediately denied the validity of the figures. Riis's hematocrit level of 41.1%, in a test conducted on 14 January 1995, was a normal value for an adult male while six months later on 10 July 1995, several days after Riis wore the yellow jersey as leader of the general classification for the first time at the Tour de France, his level was 56.3%.

Another doctor of the team, Dr. Gianni Mazzoni, was in a separate case, accused of promoting doping in sports.

=== Hematocrit variations 1994 to 1995 ===
These are the published hematocrit variations (in percentage) of Gewiss riders in 1994 and 1995.

Rider	Hematocrit % at 15 December 1994	Hematocrit % at 24 May 1995	Change
Vladislav Bobrik (RUS)	42.7	53.0	▲9.3 (28%)
Bruno Cenghialta (ITA)	37.2	54.5	▲17.3 (47%)
Francesco Frattini (ITA)	46.0	54.0	▲8.0 (17%)
Giorgio Furlan (ITA)	38.8	51.0	▲12.2 (31%)
Nicola Minali (ITA)	41.7	54.0	▲12.3 (29%)
Piotr Ugrumov (LAT)	32.8	60.0	▲27.2 (83%)
Alberto Volpi (ITA)	38.5	52.6	▲14.1 (37%)
Evgeni Berzin (RUS)	41.7	53.0	▲11.3 (27%)
Bjarne Riis (DEN)	41.1	56.3	▲15.2 (37%)

== Cyclists ==
Many well known and successful cyclists rode for Gewiss:

- (Italy) Moreno Argentin (1993–1994)
- (Russia) Evgeni Berzin (1993–1996)
- (Russia) Vladislav Bobrik (1993–1996)
- (Italy) Guido Bontempi (1994–1995)
- (Italy) Bruno Cenghialta (1994–1996)
- (Italy) Gabriele Colombo (1994–1996)
- (Italy) Giorgio Furlan (1994–1995)
- (Italy) Ivan Gotti (1995–1996)
- (Germany) Andreas Kappes (1993)
- (Italy) Nicola Minali (1993–1996)
- (Denmark) Bjarne Riis (1994–1995)
- (Latvia) Piotr Ugrumov (1993–1996)
- (Italy) Stefano Zanini (1995–1996)

== Major wins ==
1993
Stage 6 Tour Méditerranéen, Moreno Argentin
Stage 2 Driedaagse van De Panne, Nicola Minali
Stage 2 Settimana Ciclistica Lombarda, Vladislav Bobrik
Stage 5 Settimana Ciclistica Lombarda, Nicola Minali
Stages 1a & 13 Giro d'Italia, Moreno Argentin
Stage 3 Giro d'Italia, Piotr Ugrumov
Wincanton Classic Alberto Volpi
Linz Criterium, Andreas Kappes

1994
Stage 2 Settimana Siciliana, Giorgio Furlan
Ferla, Giorgio Furlan
Overall Tirreno–Adriatico, Giorgio Furlan

Stages 2, 6 & 7, Giorgio Furlan

Milan–San Remo, Giorgio Furlan
Stage 2 Setmana Catalana de Ciclismo, Nicola Minali
Overall Critérium International, Giorgio Furlan

Stage 2, Giorgio Furlan
Stage 3, Evgeni Berzin

Liège–Bastogne–Liège, Evgeni Berzin
La Flèche Wallonne, Moreno Argentin
Stage 1 Tour de Romandie, Giorgio Furlan
Stages 2 & 5 Tour de Romandie, Nicola Minali
Overall Giro d'Italia, Evgeni Berzin

Young rider classification, Evgeni Berzin
Stage 2, Moreno Argentin
Stages 4, 8 & 18, Evgeni Berzin

Russia National Time Trial Championships, Evgeni Berzin
Stage 5 Tour de France, Nicola Minali
Stage 13 Tour de France, Bjarne Riis
Stage 18 & 19 Tour de France, Piotr Ugrumov
Profronde van Stiphout, Piotr Ugrumov
Lamballe Criterium, Piotr Ugrumov
Coppa Bernocchi, Bruno Cenghialta
Stage 3b Ronde van Nederland, Dario Bottaro
Giro di Lombardia, Vladislav Bobrik

1995
Stage 3 Volta a la Comunitat Valenciana, Nicola Minali
Stage 8b Paris–Nice, Vladislav Bobrik
Overall Setmana Catalana de Ciclismo, Francesco Frattini

Stages 2, 4 & 5a, Nicola Minali
Stage 3, Francesco Frattini

Eschborn–Frankfurt City Loop, Francesco Frattini
Stage 6 Giro d'Italia, Nicola Minali
Stage 21 Giro d'Italia, Evgeni Berzin
Stage 2 Tour de Suisse, Giorgio Furlan
Denmark National Road Race Championships, Bjarne Riis
Stage 3 Tour de France (TTT)
Overall Post Danmark Rundt, Bjarne Riis

Stage 1, Nicola Minali
Stage 3b, Bjarne Riis
Stages 4 & 6, Nicola Minali

Coppa Bernocchi, Stefano Zanini
Stages 1, 6 & 11 Vuelta a España, Nicola Minali
Paris–Tours, Nicola Minali
Milano–Torino, Stefano Zanini

1996
Milan–San Remo, Gabriele Colombo
Stage 5a Setmana Catalana de Ciclismo, Stefano Zanini
Overall Giro di Sardegna, Gabriele Colombo
Stage 3 Vuelta Ciclista al País Vasco, Stefano Zanini
Stage 4 Vuelta Ciclista al País Vasco, Francesco Frattini
Amstel Gold Race, Stefano Zanini
Stage 19 Giro d'Italia, Evgeni Berzin
Stage 21 Giro d'Italia, Ivan Gotti
Prologue & Stage 8 Tour de Suisse, Evgeni Berzin
Stage 8 Tour de France, Evgeni Berzin
Stage 5 Post Danmark Rundt, Nicola Minali
Stages 2, 8, 9 & 16 Vuelta a España, Nicola Minali
Paris–Tours, Nicola Minali
Stage 1 Boland Bank Tour, Nicola Minali

1997
Stage 1 Giro di Sardegna, Nicola Minali
Stages 1 & 4 Volta ao Alentejo, Nicola Minali
Stage 3 Volta ao Alentejo, Alberto Volpi
Overall Grande Prémio 'Jornal de Notícias', Evgeni Berzin

Stages 1 & 2, Nicola Minali

Stage 4 & 21 Tour de France, Nicola Minali
Stage 1 Post Danmark Rundt, Nicola Minali
Stage 5 Tour de Pologne, Simone Bertoletti
Stage 3 Giro di Puglia, Nicola Minali

=== Supplementary statistics ===
Grand Tours by highest finishing position
Race	1993	1994	1995	1996	1997
Giro d'Italia	2	1	2	5	16
Tour de France	–	2	3	20	65
Vuelta a España	–	–	22	16	–
Major week-long stage races by highest finishing position
Race	1993	1994	1995	1996	1997
Tour Down Under	Did not Exist				
Paris–Nice	–	–	2	23	17
Tirreno–Adriatico	8	1	6	5	27
Volta a Catalunya	–	–	–	–	–
Tour of the Basque Country	–	2	4	5	34
Giro del Trentino	–	1	3	–	–
Tour de Romandie	5	19	3	6	38
Critérium du Dauphiné	–	–	–	2	–
Tour de Suisse	–	–	4	4	41
Tour de Pologne	–	–	–	–	28
Eneco Tour	–	3	–	–	14
Monument races by highest finishing position
Race	1993	1994	1995	1996	1997
Milan–San Remo	51	1	17	1	83
Tour of Flanders	3	7	11	14	50
Paris–Roubaix	–	12	20	4	–
Liège–Bastogne–Liège	5	1	25	10	3
Giro di Lombardia	7	1	5	30	44
Classics by highest finishing position
Classic	1993	1994	1995	1996	1997
Omloop Het Volk	–	–	–	–	–
Kuurne–Brussels–Kuurne	–	–	–	–	–
E3 Harelbeke	31	–	10	–	–
Gent–Wevelgem	–	23	30	–	83
Amstel Gold Race	–	2	11	1	45
La Flèche Wallonne	18	1	3	5	19
Clásica de San Sebastián	3	15	10	68	10
Paris–Tours	–	30	1	1	48

== See also ==
- List of doping cases in cycling
