= 1993 Tour of Britain =

Race details
- Dates: 9–13 August 1993
- Stages: 5
- Winning time: 23h 45' 34"

Results
	Winner	Phil Anderson (AUS)	(Motorola)
	Second	Wladimir Belli (ITA)	(Lampre–Polti)
	Third	Bo André Namtvedt (NOR)	(Subaru–Montgomery)
	Points	Ján Svorada (SVK)	(Lampre–Polti)
	Mountains	Evgeni Berzin (RUS)	(Mecair–Ballan)
	Sprints	Chris Lillywhite (GBR)	(Banana)
	Team	Motorola	

The 1993 Tour of Britain was the seventh edition of the Kellogg's Tour of Britain cycle race and was held from 9 August to 13 August 1993. The race started in Portsmouth and finished in Liverpool. The race was won by Phil Anderson of the Motorola team.

== Route ==
Stage characteristics and winners
Stage	Date	Course	Distance	Type	Winner
1	9 August	Portsmouth to Bath	160 km (99.4 mi)		Phil Anderson (AUS)
2	10 August	Cardiff to Swansea	199 km (123.7 mi)		Serge Baguet (BEL)
3	11 August	Newport to Coventry	198 km (123.0 mi)		Dag Otto Lauritzen (NOR)
4	12 August	Birmingham to Manchester	181 km (112.5 mi)		Peter De Clercq (BEL)
5	13 August	Bradford to Liverpool	170 km (105.6 mi)	Hilly stage	Eric De Clercq (BEL)

== General classification ==
Final general classification

Rank	Rider	Team	Time
1	Phil Anderson (AUS)	Motorola	23h 45' 34"
2	Wladimir Belli (ITA)	Lampre–Polti	+ 4"
3	Bo André Namtvedt (NOR)	Subaru–Montgomery	+ 8"
4	Heinz Imboden (SUI)	Mecair–Ballan	+ 20"
5	François Lemarchand (FRA)	GAN	+ 23"
6	Eddy Schurer (NED)	TVM–Bison Kit	+ 28"
7	Frankie Andreu (USA)	Motorola	+ 32"
8	Paul Haghedooren (BEL)	Collstrop–Assur Carpets	+ 32"
9	Herman Frison (BEL)	Lotto	+ 1' 18"
10	Andreas Kappes (GER)	Mecair–Ballan	+ 3' 11"
