= Vélo d'Or =

Cycle racing award

- Location: France
- Presented by: Vélo Magazine
- First award: 1992; 34 years ago
- Current holders: (Slovenia) Tadej Pogačar (3rd award) (France) Pauline Ferrand-Prévot (1st award)

Highlights
- Most awards: (Spain) Alberto Contador (4 awards)

The Vélo d'Or (French for "Golden Bicycle") is an annual cycle racing award, given to the cyclist considered to have performed the best over the racing season. It is awarded by the French cycling magazine Vélo Magazine, with the winner chosen by a panel of international cycling journalists. The Vélo d'Or is considered one of cycling's highest individual honors, similar to the Ballon d'Or in football.

Since 2022, the Vélo d'Or Femmes has also been awarded to the best female cyclist of the season. Both trophies are presented each year at the Pavillon Gabriel in Paris, alongside several sub-categories: the Eddy Merckx Trophy, awarded to the best classics rider since 2023, the Chris Hoy Trophy, awarded to the best Olympics discipline rider since 2024. There are also awards for French riders: from 1992 to 2022, the Vélo d'Or français was given to the best overall French cyclist. Since 2025, this has been subdivided into two awards: the "Trophée Bernard Hinault" for male cyclists and the "Trophée Jeannie Longo" for female cyclists.

Alberto Contador holds the record for the most awards, winning the Vélo d'Or four times: in 2007, 2008, 2009, and 2014. Lance Armstrong initially won the Vélo d'Or five times, but these victories were nullified after the USADA stripped him of his Tour de France titles following doping allegations and his eventual confession. The Vélo d'Or awards for these years were not reassigned to the runners-up.

== Men's awards ==
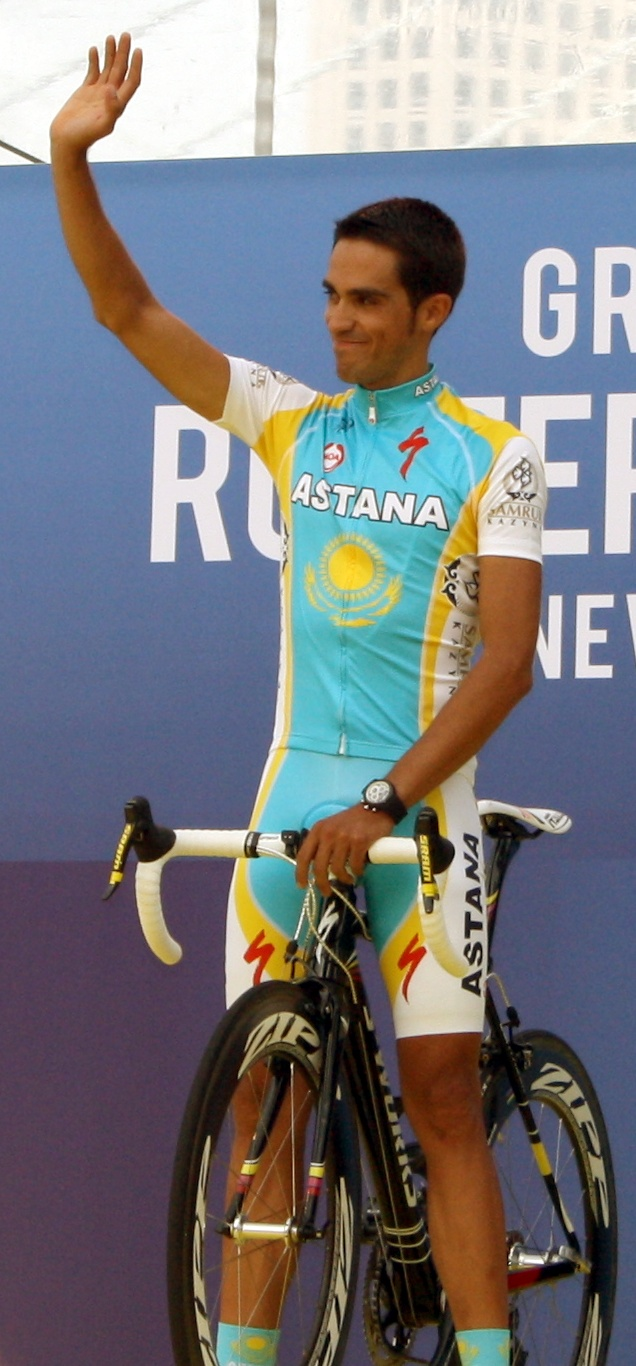
Alberto Contador won 4 awards (2007, 2008, 2009, 2014)

=== Vélo d'Or winners ===
Year	Winner	Second	Third
1992	Miguel Indurain (ESP)	Tony Rominger (SUI)	Claudio Chiappucci (ITA)
1993	Miguel Indurain (ESP)	Maurizio Fondriest (ITA)	Tony Rominger (SUI)
1994	Tony Rominger (SUI)	Miguel Indurain (ESP)	Eugeni Berzin (RUS)
1995	Laurent Jalabert (FRA)	Miguel Indurain (ESP)	Abraham Olano (ESP)
1996	Johan Museeuw (BEL)	Bjarne Riis (DEN)	Alex Zülle (SUI)
1997	Jan Ullrich (GER)	Laurent Jalabert (FRA)	Marco Pantani (ITA)
1998	Marco Pantani (ITA)	Michele Bartoli (ITA)	Lance Armstrong (USA)
1999	~~Lance Armstrong (USA)~~	Jan Ullrich (GER)	Andrei Tchmil (BEL)
2000	~~Lance Armstrong (USA)~~	Erik Zabel (GER)	Jan Ullrich (GER)
2001	~~Lance Armstrong (USA)~~	Erik Zabel (GER)	Erik Dekker (NED)
2002	Mario Cipollini (ITA)	~~Lance Armstrong (USA)~~	Paolo Bettini (ITA)
2003	~~Lance Armstrong (USA)~~	Paolo Bettini (ITA)	Alexander Vinokourov (KAZ)
2004	~~Lance Armstrong (USA)~~	Damiano Cunego (ITA)	Óscar Freire (ESP)
2005	Tom Boonen (BEL)	~~Lance Armstrong (USA)~~	Danilo Di Luca (ITA)
2006	Paolo Bettini (ITA)	Alejandro Valverde (ESP)	Fabian Cancellara (SUI)
2007	Alberto Contador (ESP)	Fabian Cancellara (SUI)	Paolo Bettini (ITA)
2008	Alberto Contador (ESP)	Fabian Cancellara (SUI)	Carlos Sastre (ESP)
2009	Alberto Contador (ESP)	Mark Cavendish (GBR)	Fabian Cancellara (SUI)
2010	Fabian Cancellara (SUI)	Alberto Contador (ESP)	Andy Schleck (LUX)
2011	Philippe Gilbert (BEL)	Cadel Evans (AUS)	Mark Cavendish (GBR)
2012	Bradley Wiggins (GBR)	Tom Boonen (BEL)	Joaquim Rodríguez (ESP)
2013	Chris Froome (GBR)	Vincenzo Nibali (ITA)	Peter Sagan (SVK)
2014	Alberto Contador (ESP)	Vincenzo Nibali (ITA)	Alejandro Valverde (ESP)
2015	Chris Froome (GBR)	Peter Sagan (SVK)	Fabio Aru (ITA)
2016	Peter Sagan (SVK)	Chris Froome (GBR)	Nairo Quintana (COL)
2017	Chris Froome (GBR)	Tom Dumoulin (NED)	Peter Sagan (SVK)
2018	Alejandro Valverde (ESP)	Geraint Thomas (GBR)	Julian Alaphilippe (FRA)
2019	Julian Alaphilippe (FRA)	Egan Bernal (COL)	Primož Roglič (SLO)
2020	Primož Roglič (SLO)	Tadej Pogačar (SLO)	Wout van Aert (BEL)
2021	Tadej Pogačar (SLO)	Primož Roglič (SLO)	Wout van Aert (BEL)
2022	Remco Evenepoel (BEL)	Wout van Aert (BEL)	Tadej Pogačar (SLO)
2023	Jonas Vingegaard (DEN)	Mathieu van der Poel (NED)	Tadej Pogačar (SLO)
2024	Tadej Pogačar (SLO)	Remco Evenepoel (BEL)	Mathieu van der Poel (NED)
2025	Tadej Pogačar (SLO)	Jonas Vingegaard (DEN)	Mathieu van der Poel (NED)

=== Wins per rider ===
Rank	Rider	Wins	Second	Third
1	Alberto Contador (ESP)	4	1	0
2	Tadej Pogačar (SLO)	3	1	2
3	Christopher Froome (GBR)	3	1	0
4	Miguel Indurain (ESP)	2	2	0
5	Fabian Cancellara (SUI)	1	2	2
6	Paolo Bettini (ITA)	1	1	2
6	Peter Sagan (SVK)	1	1	2
8	Tony Rominger (SUI)	1	1	1
8	Jan Ullrich (GER)	1	1	1
8	Alejandro Valverde (ESP)	1	1	1
8	Primož Roglič (SLO)	1	1	1
12	Laurent Jalabert (FRA)	1	1	0
12	Tom Boonen (BEL)	1	1	0
12	Remco Evenepoel (BEL)	1	1	0
12	Jonas Vingegaard (DEN)	1	1	0
15	Marco Pantani (ITA)	1	0	1
15	Julian Alaphilippe (FRA)	1	0	1
17	Johan Museeuw (BEL)	1	0	0
17	Mario Cipollini (ITA)	1	0	0
17	Philippe Gilbert (BEL)	1	0	0
17	Bradley Wiggins (GBR)	1	0	0
22	Erik Zabel (GER)	0	2	0
22	Vincenzo Nibali (ITA)	0	2	0
23	Wout van Aert (BEL)	0	1	2
23	Mathieu van der Poel (NED)	0	1	2
25	Mark Cavendish (GBR)	0	1	1
26	Maurizio Fondriest (ITA)	0	1	0
26	Bjarne Riis (DEN)	0	1	0
26	Michele Bartoli (ITA)	0	1	0
26	Damiano Cunego (ITA)	0	1	0
26	Cadel Evans (AUS)	0	1	0
26	Tom Dumoulin (NED)	0	1	0
26	Geraint Thomas (GBR)	0	1	0
26	Egan Bernal (COL)	0	1	0
34	Claudio Chiappucci (ITA)	0	0	1
34	Evgueni Berzin (RUS)	0	0	1
34	Abraham Olano (ESP)	0	0	1
34	Alex Zülle (SUI)	0	0	1
34	Lance Armstrong (USA)	~~5~~	~~2~~	1
34	Andreï Tchmil (BEL)	0	0	1
34	Erik Dekker (NED)	0	0	1
34	Alexandre Vinokourov (KAZ)	0	0	1
34	Óscar Freire (ESP)	0	0	1
34	Danilo Di Luca (ITA)	0	0	1
34	Carlos Sastre (ESP)	0	0	1
34	Andy Schleck (LUX)	0	0	1
34	Joaquim Rodríguez (ESP)	0	0	1
34	Fabio Aru (ITA)	0	0	1
34	Nairo Quintana (COL)	0	0	1

=== Eddy Merckx Trophy (best classics rider) ===
Year	Winner	Second	Third
2023	Mathieu van der Poel (NED)	Tadej Pogačar (SLO)	Remco Evenepoel (BEL)
2024	Tadej Pogačar (SLO)	Mathieu van der Poel (NED)	Jasper Philipsen (BEL)
2025	Tadej Pogačar (SLO)	Mathieu van der Poel (NED)	Remco Evenepoel (BEL)

=== Eddy Merckx Trophy Wins per rider ===
Rank	Rider	Wins	Second	Third
1	Tadej Pogačar (SLO)	2	1	0
2	Mathieu van der Poel (NED)	1	2	0
3	Remco Evenepoel (BEL)	0	0	2
4	Jasper Philipsen (BEL)	0	0	1

== Women's awards ==
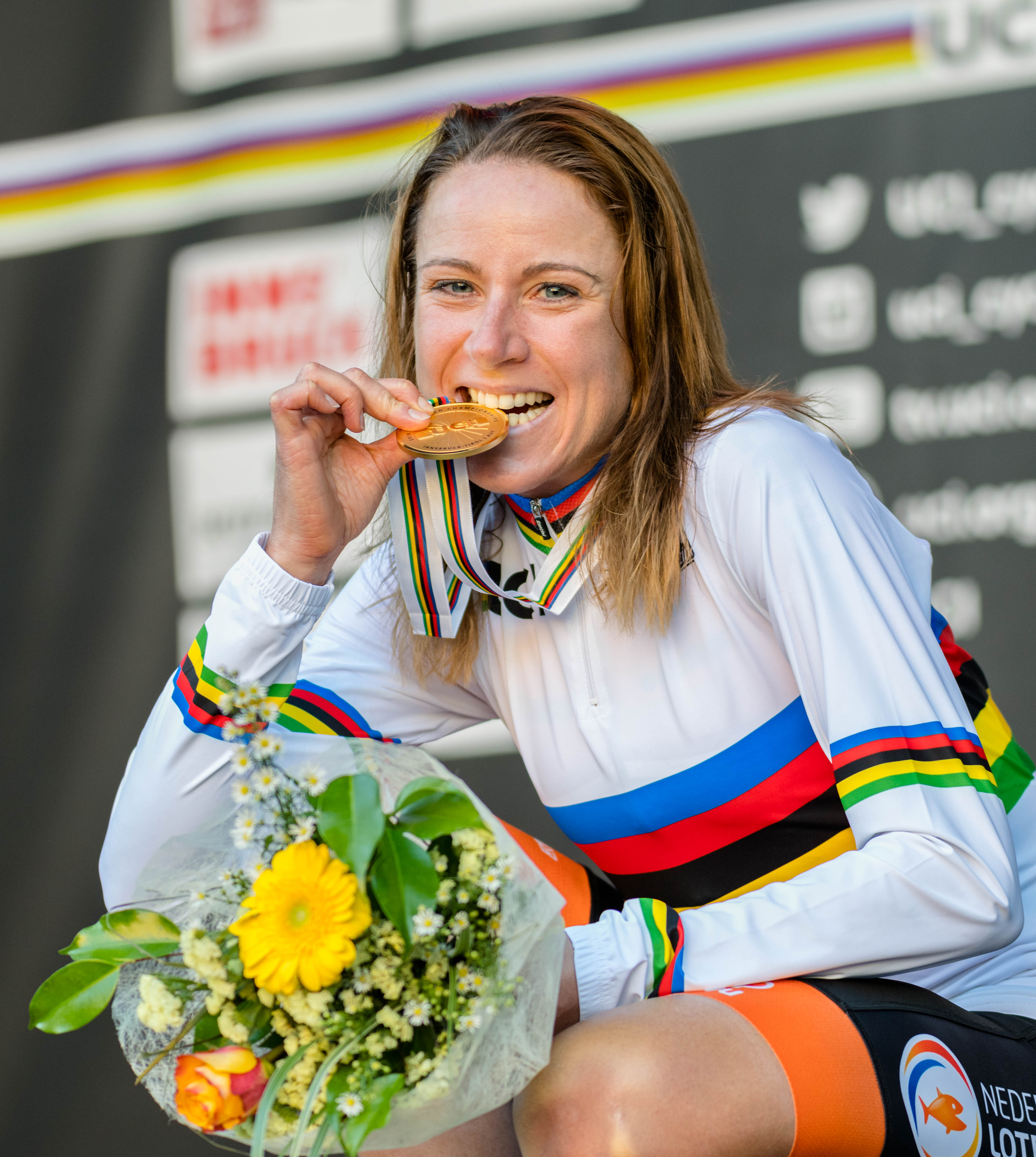
Annemiek van Vleuten won the inaugural Vélo d'Or Femmes in 2022

=== Vélo d'Or Femmes winners ===
Year	Winner	Second	Third
2022	Annemiek van Vleuten (NED)	Lotte Kopecky (BEL)	Pauline Ferrand-Prévot (FRA)
2023	Demi Vollering (NED)	Lotte Kopecky (BEL)	Annemiek van Vleuten (NED)
2024	Lotte Kopecky (BEL)	Demi Vollering (NED)	Kasia Niewiadoma (POL)
2025	Pauline Ferrand-Prévot (FRA)	Demi Vollering (NED)	Lorena Wiebes (NED)

=== Wins per rider ===
Rank	Rider	Wins	Second	Third
1	Lotte Kopecky (BEL)	1	2	0
1	Demi Vollering (NED)	1	2	0
3	Annemiek van Vleuten (NED)	1	0	1
3	Pauline Ferrand-Prévot (FRA)	1	0	1
4	Kasia Niewiadoma (POL)	0	0	1
4	Lorena Wiebes (NED)	0	0	1

=== Eddy Merckx Trophy (best classics rider) ===
Year	Winner	Second	Third
2023	Lotte Kopecky (BEL)	Demi Vollering (NED)	Alison Jackson (CAN)
2024	Lotte Kopecky (BEL)	Elisa Longo Borghini (ITA)	Marianne Vos (NED)
2025	Lorena Wiebes (NED)	Pauline Ferrand-Prévot (FRA)	Demi Vollering (NED)

=== Wins per rider ===
Rank	Rider	Wins	Second	Third
1	Lotte Kopecky (BEL)	2	0	0
2	Lorena Wiebes (NED)	1	0	0
3	Demi Vollering (NED)	0	1	1
4	Pauline Ferrand-Prévot (FRA)	0	1	0
4	Elisa Longo Borghini (ITA)	0	1	0
5	Marianne Vos (NED)	0	0	1
5	Alison Jackson (CAN)	0	0	1

== Additional awards ==
=== Chris Hoy Trophy ===
The Chris Hoy Trophy is awarded to the best cyclist across the various Olympic cycling disciplines.

Year	Winner	Second	Third
2024	Harrie Lavreysen (NED)	Ellesse Andrews (NZL)	Joris Daudet (FRA)

=== Gino Mäder Prize ===
The Gino Mäder Prize honors rider's social commitment. It is named after cyclist Gino Mäder, who raised money and frequently spoke in support of humanitarian and environmental causes, before dying in 2023 after a crash at the Tour de Suisse.

Year	Winner
2024	Luis Angel Mate (SPA)
2025	Matteo Trentin (ITA)
