= Stefano Checchin =

Italian cyclist (born 1987)

Personal information
- Born: 14 January 1967 (age 59) Camposampiero, Italy

Cycling career
- Sport: Cycling
- Current team: Retired
- Discipline: Road
- Role: Rider

Professional teams
- 1993–1996: Carrera Jeans–Tassoni
- 1997–1998: Mercatone Uno

Stefano Checchin (born 14 January 1967 in Camposampiero) is an Italian former professional road cyclist. He rode in the 1994 and 1996 Giro d'Italia.

== Major results ==
1988
1st Trofeo Città di San Vendemiano
1990
1st Popolarissima
1991
2nd Trofeo Banca Popolare di Vicenza
1992
3rd Giro del Belvedere
1993
1st Giro del Casentino
1st Trofeo Gianfranco Bianchin
3rd Overall Giro d'Abruzzo
3rd Grand Premio di Poggiana
3rd Piccolo Giro di Lombardia
1996
10th Overall Tour de Suisse
1997
3rd Trofeo Melinda
1998
3rd Giro di Romagna
