= 1999 Vuelta a Murcia =

Race details
- Dates: 3–7 March 1999
- Stages: 5
- Distance: 669 km (415.7 mi)
- Winning time: 17h 54' 32"

Results
	Winner	Marco Pantani (ITA)
	Second	Javier Pascual Rodríguez (ESP)
	Third	Beat Zberg (SUI)

The 1999 Vuelta a Murcia was the 15th edition of the Vuelta a Murcia cycle race and was held on 3 March to 7 March 1999. The race started and finished in Murcia. The race was won by Marco Pantani.

== General classification ==
Final general classification

Rank	Rider	Time
1	Marco Pantani (ITA)	17h 54' 32"
2	Javier Pascual Rodríguez (ESP)	+ 24"
3	Beat Zberg (SUI)	+ 42"
4	Claus Michael Møller (DEN)	+ 48"
5	Mikel Zarrabeitia (ESP)	+ 1' 52"
6	Stefano Garzelli (ITA)	+ 1' 56"
7	Pietro Caucchioli (ITA)	+ 2' 14"
8	Santiago Blanco (ESP)	+ 2' 18"
9	Ginés Salmerón (ESP)	+ 2' 47"
10	Íñigo Cuesta (ESP)	+ 2' 58"
