= Giorgio Furlan =

Italian road bicycle racer (born 1966)

Personal information
- Full name: Giorgio Furlan
- Born: 9 March 1966 (age 60) Treviso, Italy
- Height: 1.74 m (5 ft 9 in)
- Weight: 63 kg (139 lb; 9 st 13 lb)

Cycling career
- Sport: Cycling
- Current team: General Store–Essegibi–Fratelli Curia
- Discipline: Road
- Role: Rider (retired); Directeur sportif

Amateur team
- 1986–1988: Arredo House–ZG Mobili

Professional teams
- 1989: Malvor–Sidi
- 1990: Diana–Colnago–Animex
- 1991–1993: Ariostea
- 1994–1995: Gewiss–Ballan
- 1996–1997: Saeco–AS Juvenes San Marino
- 1998: Vini Caldirola

Managerial team
- 2018–: General Store Bottoli Zardini

Major wins
- Grand Tours Giro d'Italia 2 individual stages (1992, 1993) Stage races Tour de Suisse (1992) Tirreno–Adriatico (1994) Critérium International (1994) One-day races and Classics National Road Race Championships (1990) Milan–San Remo (1994) La Flèche Wallonne (1992)

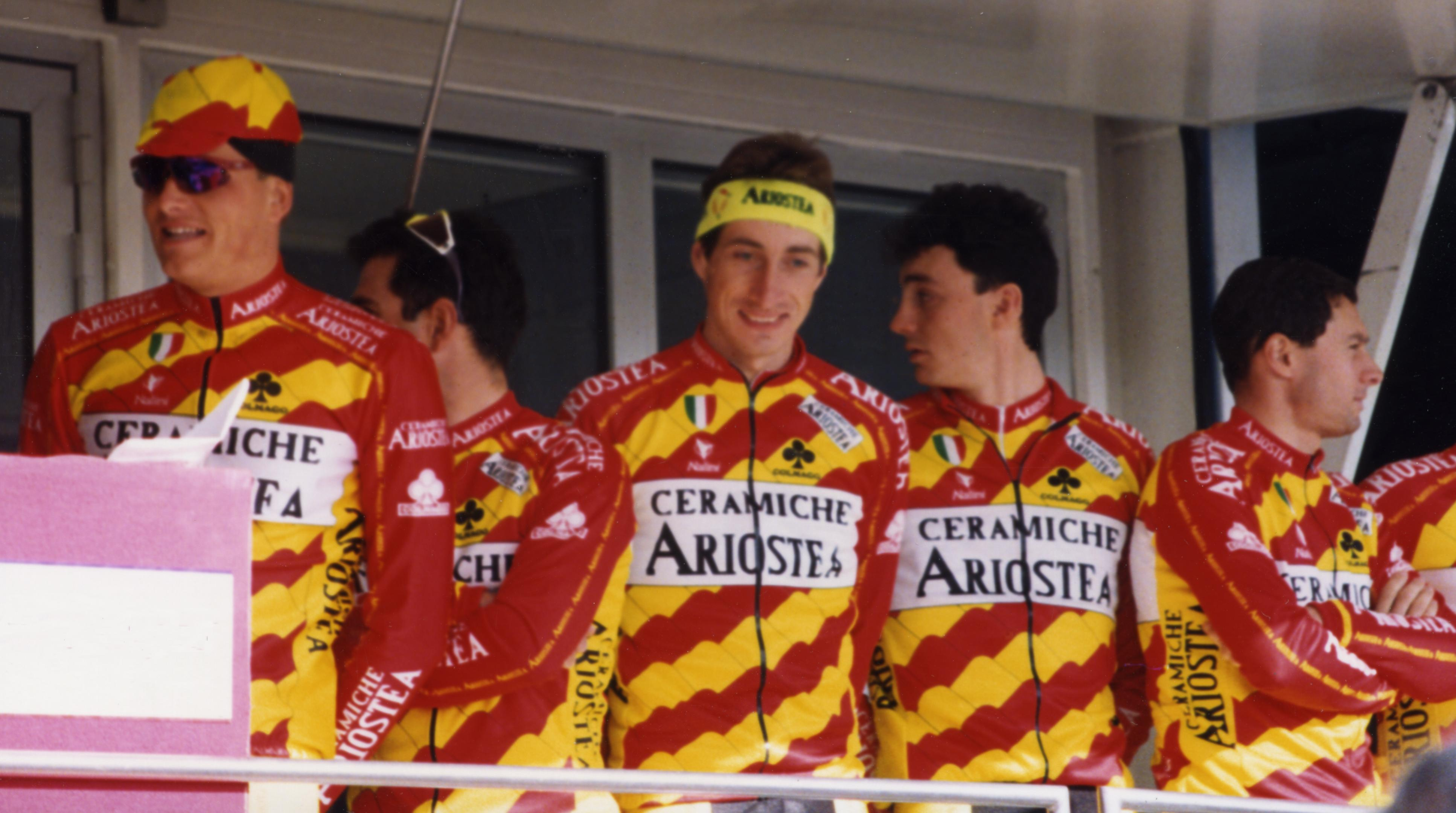
Ariostea at the 1993 Paris–Nice

Giorgio Furlan (born 9 March 1966 in Treviso) is an Italian former road bicycle racer, who currently works as a directeur sportif for UCI Continental team General Store–Essegibi–Fratelli Curia.

== Major results ==
1986
1st Trofeo Gianfranco Bianchin
1st Giro del Medio Brenta
1987
1st Gran Premio Sportivi di Poggiana
1988
1st Stages 1 & 4 Giro della Valle d'Aosta
1989
3rd Road race, National Road Championships
1990
1st Road race, National Road Championships (Gran Premio Città di Camaiore)
9th GP de Denain
1991
1st Coppa Bernocchi
2nd Trofeo Pantalica
3rd Giro di Toscana
7th Overall Tour de Suisse
1992
1st Overall Tour de Suisse

1st Stage 2

1st Giro di Toscana
1st La Flèche Wallonne
1st Stage 14 Giro d'Italia
2nd Coppa Agostoni
2nd Giro della Provincia di reggio Calabria
3rd Overall Critérium International

1st Stage 2

8th Liège–Bastogne–Liège
8th Tre Valli Varesine
8th Giro del Veneto
1993
1st Stage 9 Giro d'Italia
1st Stage 2 Tour de Suisse
2nd Giro di Lombardia
2nd Coppa Sabatini
2nd Coppa Placci
2nd Giro del Lazio
2nd Giro del Veneto
3rd Giro di Romagna
4th Overall Tour de Romandie
6th Overall UCI Road World Cup
6th Milan–San Remo
6th Rund um den Henninger Turm
7th Overall Tour of the Basque Country
7th Gran Premio Città di Camaiore
8th Trofeo Melinda
9th Amstel Gold Race
1994
1st Overall Tirreno–Adriatico

1st Stages 2, 6 & 7

1st Overall Critérium International

1st Stage 2

1st Milan–San Remo
1st Trofeo Pantalica
1st Stage 1 Tour de Romandie
1st Stage 2 Settimana Ciclistica Internazionale
2nd La Flèche Wallonne
2nd Coppa Agostoni
3rd Liège–Bastogne–Liège
3rd Coppa Placci
4th Giro del Veneto
5th Overall UCI Road World Cup
8th Züri-Metzgete
1995
1st Stage 5 Tour of Galicia
3rd Züri-Metzgete
4th Overall Tour de Suisse

1st Stage 2

6th Overall Hofbrau Cup
1997
2nd Criterium d'Abruzzo
7th Giro dell'Appennino
9th Trofeo Matteotti

=== Grand Tour general classification results timeline ===
| Grand Tour | 1990 | 1991 | 1992 | 1993 | 1994 | 1995 | 1996 | 1997 | 1998 |
|---|---|---|---|---|---|---|---|---|---|
| Giro d'Italia | 126 | 59 | 19 | 12 | DNF | 34 | DNF | — | 62 |
| Tour de France | — | — | — | — | 58 | — | — | 74 | — |
| Vuelta a España | — | — | — | — | — | DNF | 43 | 78 | — |

Legend
| — | Did not compete |
| DNF | Did not finish |
