= 1994 La Flèche Wallonne =

Race details
- Dates: 20 April 1994
- Stages: 1
- Distance: 205 km (127.4 mi)
- Winning time: 4h 56' 00"

Results
	Winner	Moreno Argentin (ITA)	(Gewiss–Ballan)
	Second	Giorgio Furlan (ITA)	(Gewiss–Ballan)
	Third	Evgeni Berzin (RUS)	(Gewiss–Ballan)

The 1994 La Flèche Wallonne was the 58th edition of La Flèche Wallonne cycle race and was held on 20 April 1994. The race started in Spa and finished in Huy. The race was won by Moreno Argentin of the Gewiss–Ballan team. Argentin and his teammates, Giorgio Furlan and Evgeni Berzin had escaped from the pack 72 km (45 mi) from the finish, never to be caught again.

Following the race, suspicion arose around the dominant performance of the Gewiss riders. Their team doctor, Michele Ferrari, was interviewed by French newspaper L'Equipe the morning after the race and asked about erythropoietin (EPO), a substance used for purposes of doping. Speaking about the dangers of EPO, Ferrari commented that he did not consider it more dangerous than "ten litres of orange juice".

== General classification ==
Final general classification

Rank	Rider	Team	Time
1	Moreno Argentin (ITA)	Gewiss–Ballan	4h 56' 00"
2	Giorgio Furlan (ITA)	Gewiss–Ballan	+ 0"
3	Evgeni Berzin (RUS)	Gewiss–Ballan	+ 22"
4	Gianni Bugno (ITA)	Team Polti–Vaporetto	+ 1' 14"
5	Stefano Della Santa (ITA)	Mapei–CLAS	+ 1' 14"
6	Francesco Casagrande (ITA)	Mercatone Uno–Medeghini	+ 1' 23"
7	Claudio Chiappucci (ITA)	Carrera Jeans–Tassoni	+ 1' 23"
8	Davide Cassani (ITA)	GB–MG Maglificio	+ 1' 29"
9	Ronan Pensec (FRA)	Novemail–Histor–Laser Computer	+ 1' 35"
10	Marco Giovannetti (ITA)	Mapei–CLAS	+ 1' 39"
