= 1994 Tour of the Basque Country =

Race details
- Dates: 4–8 April 1994
- Stages: 5
- Distance: 868.8 km (539.8 mi)
- Winning time: 23h 25' 04"

Results
| | Winner | Tony Rominger (SUI) | (Mapei–CLAS) |
| | Second | Evgeni Berzin (RUS) | (Gewiss–Ballan) |
| | Third | Claudio Chiappucci (ITA) | (Carrera Jeans–Tassoni) |

The 1994 Tour of the Basque Country was the 34th edition of the Tour of the Basque Country cycle race and was held from 4 April to 8 April 1994. The race started in Mondragón and finished in Elosiaga. The race was won by Tony Rominger of the Mapei team.

== General classification ==
Final general classification

| Rank | Rider | Team | Time |
|---|---|---|---|
| 1 | Tony Rominger (SUI) | Mapei–CLAS | 22h 44' 27" |
| 2 | Evgeni Berzin (RUS) | Gewiss–Ballan | + 43" |
| 3 | Claudio Chiappucci (ITA) | Carrera Jeans–Tassoni | + 58" |
| 4 | Francesco Casagrande (ITA) | Mercatone Uno–Medeghini | + 1' 35" |
| 5 | Laurent Dufaux (SUI) | ONCE | + 2' 06" |
| 6 | Luca Gelfi (ITA) | Brescialat–Ceramiche Refin | + 2' 12" |
| 7 | Laurent Jalabert (FRA) | ONCE | + 2' 20" |
| 8 | Fernando Escartín (ESP) | Mapei–CLAS | + 2' 27" |
| 9 | Udo Bölts (GER) | Team Telekom | + 2' 28" |
| 10 | Vladislav Bobrik (RUS) | Gewiss–Ballan | + 2' 35" |
