= 1996 Tour of the Basque Country =

Race details
- Dates: 8–12 April 1996
- Stages: 5
- Distance: 817.5 km (508.0 mi)
- Winning time: 20h 50' 21"

Results
	Winner	Francesco Casagrande (ITA)	(Saeco–AS Juvenes San Marino)
	Second	Pascal Hervé (FRA)	(Festina–Lotus)
	Third	Abraham Olano (ESP)	(Mapei–GB)

The 1996 Tour of the Basque Country was the 36th edition of the Tour of the Basque Country cycle race and was held from 8 April to 12 April 1996. The race started in Lasarte and finished at Orio. The race was won by Francesco Casagrande of the Saeco team.

== General classification ==
Final general classification

Rank	Rider	Team	Time
1	Francesco Casagrande (ITA)	Saeco–AS Juvenes San Marino	20h 50' 21"
2	Pascal Hervé (FRA)	Festina–Lotus	+ 3"
3	Abraham Olano (ESP)	Mapei–GB	+ 27"
4	Mauro Gianetti (SUI)	Team Polti	+ 31"
5	Evgeni Berzin (RUS)	Gewiss Playbus	+ 42"
6	Jesús Montoya (ESP)	Motorola	+ 54"
7	Stefano Della Santa (ITA)	Mapei–GB	+ 1' 00"
8	Alexander Gontchenkov (RUS)	Roslotto–ZG Mobili	+ 1' 02"
9	Juan Carlos Domínguez (ESP)	Kelme–Artiach	+ 1' 17"
10	Davide Rebellin (ITA)	Team Polti	+ 1' 18"
