= Evgeni Berzin =

Russian cyclist

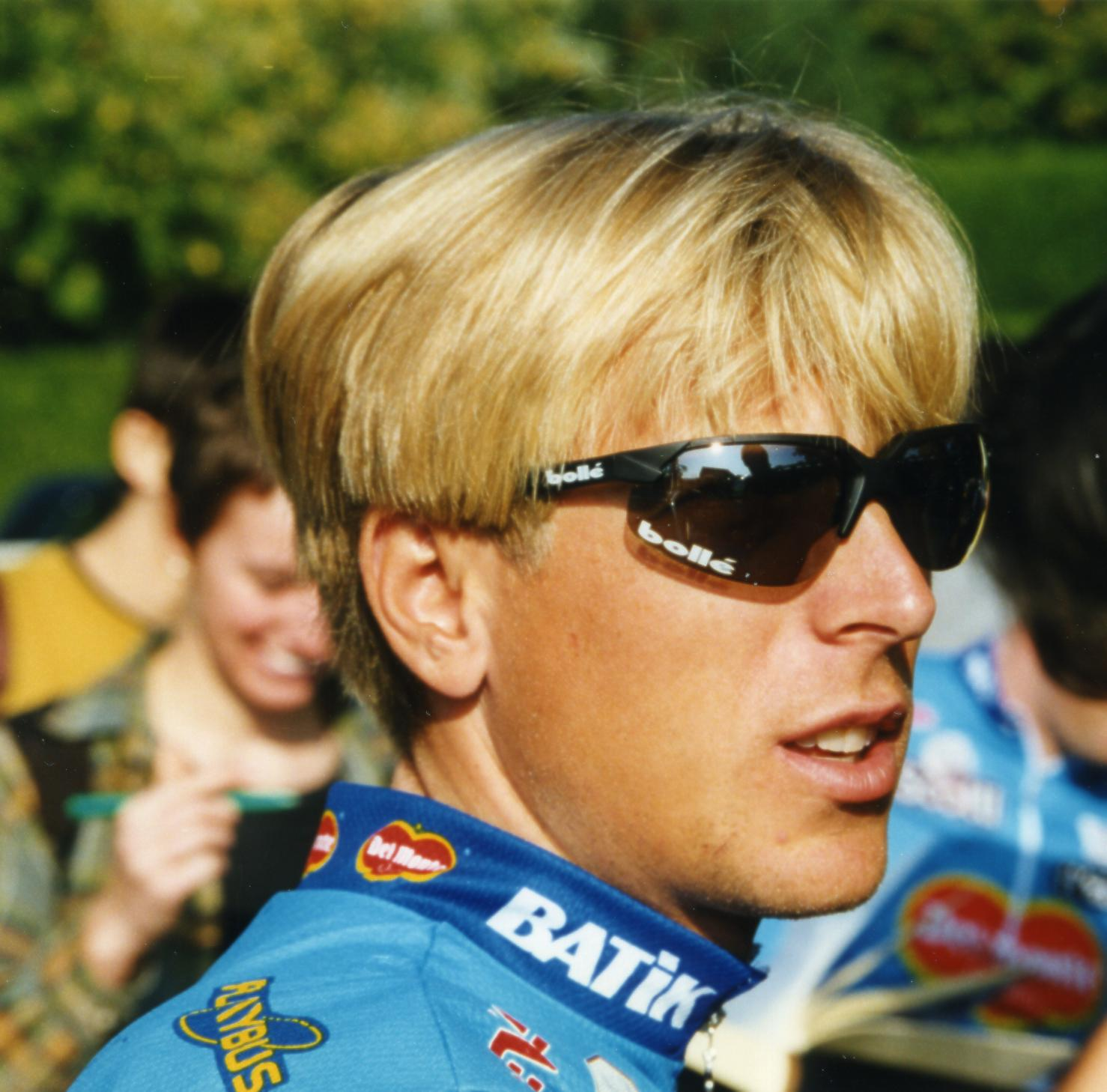
- Berzin at the 1997 Paris–Tours

Personal information
- Full name: Evgeni Valentinovich Berzin; Евге́ний Валенти́нович Берзин
- Born: 3 June 1970 (age 56) Vyborg, Soviet Union
- Height: 1.70 m (5 ft 7 in)
- Weight: 64 kg (141 lb; 10 st 1 lb)

Cycling career
- Sport: Cycling
- Discipline: Road
- Role: Rider
- Rider type: All-rounder

Professional teams
- 1993–1996: Mecair–Ballan
- 1997: Batik–Del Monte
- 1998: Française des Jeux
- 1999: Amica Chips–Costa de Almería
- 1999–2000: Mobilvetta Design–Northwave

Major wins
- Grand Tours Tour de France 1 individual stage (1996) Giro d'Italia General classification (1994) Young rider classification (1994) 5 individual stages (1994, 1995, 1996) One-day races and Classics National Time Trial Championships (1994) Liège–Bastogne–Liège (1994)
Medal record
Representing Soviet Union
Men's track cycling
World Championships
Gold medal – first place	1990 Maebashi	Amateur Individual Pursuit
Gold medal – first place	1990 Maebashi	Amateur Team Pursuit
Silver medal – second place	1989 Lyon	Amateur Team Pursuit
Silver medal – second place	1991 Stuttgart	Amateur Team Pursuit

Evgeni Valentinovich Berzin (Russian: Евге́ний Валенти́нович Берзин; born 3 June 1970) is a Russian former road cyclist.

After winning both the amateur individual pursuit and team pursuit titles for the Soviet Union at the 1990 UCI Track Cycling World Championships, Berzin turned professional with Mecair–Ballan in 1993. In 1994, his second professional season, he won Liège–Bastogne–Liège and the Giro d'Italia, becoming the first Russian cyclist to win a Grand Tour. He finished second in the 1995 Giro d'Italia.

== Career ==
=== Early years ===
Berzin began his career as a track rider in the youth system of the Soviet team, under Alexandre Kuznetsov, joining when he was 14 years old. He won the Men's Amateur Individual Pursuit and the Team Amateur Pursuit at the 1990 UCI Track Cycling World Championships and gained silver in the Team Amateur Pursuit a year later. In 1992, Berzin wanted to switch to road racing in order to compete in the road race at the 1992 Olympics, but Kuznetsov refused, instead aiming to focus on the track events. Berzin subsequently left Russia and went to Italy with his girlfriend, Stella. There, he teamed up with Emanuele Bombini, a recently retired rider in the process of building a cycling team around former world champion Moreno Argentin with Mecair, an engineering company, as the main sponsor. The team, Mecair–Ballan, was formed for 1993 and Berzin became part of it, alongside his friend Vladislav Bobrik.

=== Professional career ===
==== 1993: The first season ====
In his first season as a professional, Berzin rode as a domestique for team captain Piotr Ugrumov, who would finish second overall at the Giro d'Italia. Berzin himself finished the Giro in 90th place. He also rode the 1993 Tour of Britain, where he finished second on stage 4. The end of the stage was notable for the on-road arguments between Berzin and the stage winner, Peter de Clercq, as Berzin had refused to assist with pace-making over the final 10 km (6.2 mi) of the stage. The same year, he was the runner-up in the Settimana Ciclistica, in Lombardia, Italy. He finished the season ranked 379th in the UCI Road World Rankings.

==== 1994: Rise to stardom ====
Electronics company Gewiss took over lead sponsorship of Berzin's team for 1994 and the squad brought on sports physician Michele Ferrari from the University of Ferrara as the new team doctor. Berzin was competitive right from the outset of the new season. He was in the top three at the Tour Méditerranéen, Trofeo Laigueglia, and Settimana Siciliana. He then finished second overall to teammate Giorgio Furlan at Tirreno–Adriatico. He won the time trial at the Critérium International, and finished third overall, as Furlan again won the race. Berzin finished the Tour of the Basque Country in second place behind Tony Rominger and signed a contract extension with Gewiss–Ballan at higher wages until 1996.

A week after signing his new contract, Berzin lined up at Liège–Bastogne–Liège, one of the most important classic races in cycling. Late in the race, he was part of a six-man leading group, including reigning world champion Lance Armstrong and Rominger. He accelerated away from the group and won the race. Just three days later, at La Flèche Wallonne, Berzin and his Gewiss–Ballan teammates Argentin and Furlan broke away from the field at the first passage of the Mur de Huy, 65 km (40 mi) from the finish. The rest of the field was unable to counter what cycling journalist William Fotheringham called "the greatest show of strength in any Classic by any team". Argentin was allowed to win, in what was his last season as a professional, and Berzin finished third behind Furlan. Comments by Ferrari to the press afterwards, saying that "anything that doesn’t result in a positive test isn’t doping" cast doubts over the performance.

Following his strong performances in the classics, tensions between Berzin and his team grew. On stage 3 of the Giro del Trentino, Berzin was ordered back from an attack on his team leader, Argentin, eventually finishing the race in second place behind him. At the same time, Berzin demanded that his contract, valued at an estimated £17,000 per month, be renegotiated, which his team refused.

Berzin entered the 1994 Giro d'Italia as co-leader next to Ugrumov, but soon established himself as the leading rider, finishing the first-day time trial ahead of favourite Miguel Induráin, second just to Armand de las Cuevas. On stage 4 to Campitello Matese, he attacked, winning the stage and taking a minute from Induráin and three minutes from Ugrumov. The first long time trial of the race followed on stage 8 to Follonica. Berzin was again victorious, and he extended his advantage over Induráin to 3:39 minutes. On stage 15, Berzin attempted to follow an attack by Marco Pantani, but was dropped. Induráin then left Berzin behind as well, joining up with eventual stage winner Pantani. Berzin would lose four minutes to Pantani and thirty seconds to Induráin, but retained the race lead by 1:18 over the former. He then won the last time trial of the race on stage 18, ahead of Induráin. Over the two final mountain stages in the Alps, Berzin stayed with Pantani and Induráin, helped significantly by Argentin to cover the relentlessness of Pantani's attacks. He became the first Russian and first rider from a former Eastern bloc country to win a Grand Tour. His final winning margin over Pantani was 2:51 minutes. However, the tensions within the team increased during the Giro. Berzin still demanded higher pay and came into conflict with his teammates, who accused him of not showing enough respect.

Embroiled in his contract dispute, he raced only two more times over the rest of 1994, finishing 21st at the inaugural world time trial championship. Having been offered a lucrative contract by Team Polti–Vaporetto, Berzin tried to force his way out of riding for Gewiss–Ballan by means of a lawsuit, but on 1 December 1994, the court ruled against him. He would stay with the team for the remainder of his contract.

==== 1995–1996: Ups and Downs ====
In 1995, Berzin returned to the Giro d'Italia, with Rominger also on the start line. Berzin would eventually finish second overall, but a strained relationship between himself and teammate Ugrumov, third overall, prevented them from seriously challenging Rominger. During stage 14, Ugrumov even actively rode with Rominger to distance Berzin, who managed to get back with some difficulty. Berzin's best moment of the race came on the penultimate day, when he won the stage to Salita di Montegrino Valtravaglia, coming in 25 seconds ahead of Rominger and Ugrumov, thereby securing second place.

Just a few days after the Giro ended, Berzin took victory at the Euskal Bizikleta. He was also part of the Gewiss–Ballan team that won the team time trial at the 1995 Tour de France on stage 3. He eventually retired from the race on stage 10, having lost 15 minutes to Induráin the day before and, according to Dutch newspaper De Volkskrant, being "physically demolished and mentally broken".

By 1996, his performances began to fade, leading the press to question his abilities and focus on his personal life, which included him and his wife Stella separating. Berzin returned for the 1996 Giro d'Italia, where he won the time trial on stage 19, putting him into provisional third place overall, just 14 seconds behind leader Pavel Tonkov. He would however lose significant time the next day, and eventually finished in 10th place overall. At the Tour de Suisse, he won the prologue, two seconds ahead of Bjarne Riis. He won the time trial on stage 8 as well, this time ahead of Gianni Faresin and Armstrong. In the overall classification, he was eventually fourth.

At the 1996 Tour de France, he took the yellow jersey as leader of the general classification on stage 7 to Les Arcs, the day that saw Induráin falter at the Tour for the first time in six years. He was the first Russian rider to wear the yellow jersey at the Tour. Berzin then won the time trial to Val-d'Isère the next day. Stage 9 to Sestriere was shortened due to snow. Riis attacked almost from the beginning of the now 46 km (29 mi)-long stage. Riis would win the stage and take the yellow jersey from Berzin en route to eventual overall victory. Berzin finished in Paris in 20th place.

==== Later career ====
In 1997, Berzin followed Bombini, who set up a new team, Batik–Del Monte, which included many riders from the former Gewiss squad. At the 1997 Giro d'Italia, Berzin placed second to Tonkov at the difficult stage-three time trial to San Marino. He faded later in the race and finished 20th overall, 49 minutes behind the winner, Ivan Gotti. He rode the Tour de France again, finishing third in the prologue time trial in Rouen, but he later abandoned the race, due to a broken clavicle.

His contract with the Batik–Del Monte team stipulated that Berzin had to try to break the hour record in 1997. The plan to attempt the effort right after the Tour de France was foiled by his injuries sustained during the race. He eventually attempted to beat the record set by Chris Boardman in Bordeaux on 19 October. Prevented from using the same aerodynamic handlebars Boardman had used due to a change in regulations and further hindered by riding at sea level, Berzin abandoned his run after just 17 minutes, with an average speed 5 km/h (3.1 mph) slower than Boardman's.

Trying to rebuild his career, Berzin joined the Française des Jeux team for 1998, but failed to deliver. He launched unsuccessful breakaways at Liège–Bastogne–Liège and at the Four Days of Dunkirk. He left the team at the end of the year, with team manager Marc Madiot stating that "his good days were behind him, no matter what". Since his team was not invited, Berzin missed the Giro d'Italia, but rode the Tour de France, finishing in 25th position, almost 43 minutes behind winner Marco Pantani.

By 1999, his performances had deteriorated considerably. He rode his final Giro d'Italia, this time for Amica Chips–Costa de Almería, but he finished in 52nd place, over 2 hours down on the winner, Gotti.

Berzin was prevented from starting the 2000 Giro d'Italia, as he received a two-week ban, due to an elevated hematocrit level, indicating the use of erythropoietin (EPO), a product used for the purposes of doping. His contract with the Mobilvetta Design–Rossin team was subsequently terminated. Berzin retired in 2001.

== After Cycling ==
Berzin owns a car showroom in Oltrepò Pavese, where he lives, and a Fiat dealership near Milan. For several years, he organised a criterium race for professionals, held shortly after the Giro d'Italia, the "Criterium Gran Premio Città di Broni".

== Major results ==
1988
1st Team pursuit, National Junior Track Championships
1st Team pursuit, UCI Amateur Track World Championships
1989
1st Team pursuit, National Amateur Track Championships
1990
1st Team pursuit, National Amateur Track Championships
UCI Amateur Track World Championships

1st Individual pursuit
1st Team pursuit

3rd Overall Redlands Bicycle Classic

1st Stage 1

1991
1st Team pursuit, UCI Amateur Track World Championships
1st Stage 1 Redlands Bicycle Classic
1992
1st Overall Course Cycliste de Solidarnosc et des Champions Olympiques
1st Overall Ruban Granitier Breton

1st Stage 2

7th Overall Tour de l'Avenir
1993
7th Firenze–Pistoia
1994
1st Time trial, National Road Championships
1st Overall Giro d'Italia

1st Young rider classification
1st Stages 4, 8 & 18

1st Liège–Bastogne–Liège
1st Giro dell'Appennino
2nd Overall Tour of the Basque Country
2nd Overall Euskal Bizikleta

1st Stages 3 & 5

2nd Overall Giro del Trentino
2nd Overall Tour Méditerranéen
3rd La Flèche Wallonne
3rd Overall Critérium International

1st Stage 3

3rd Overall Settimana Internazionale di Coppi e Bartali
3rd Trofeo Laigueglia
5th Trofeo Pantalica
1995
1st Overall Euskal Bizikleta

1st Stage 2

2nd Overall Giro d'Italia

1st Stage 21

3rd Overall Critérium International
3rd La Flèche Wallonne
4th Overall Tour of the Basque Country
4th Giro dell'Appennino
10th Overall Giro del Trentino
1996
Tour de France

1st Stage 8
Held after Stages 7–8

1st Stage 5b Tirreno–Adriatico
3rd Boucles de l'Aulne
4th Overall Tour de Suisse

1st Prologue & Stage 8

5th Overall Tour of the Basque Country
5th Klasika Primavera
6th Overall Tour de Romandie
10th Overall Giro d'Italia

1st Stage 19

1997
1st Overall Grande Prémio Jornal de Notícias
5th Overall Volta ao Alentejo
1998
3rd Overall Four Days of Dunkirk
9th Overall Grand Prix du Midi Libre

=== Grand Tour general classification results timeline ===
Grand Tour	1993	1994	1995	1996	1997	1998	1999	2000
Giro d'Italia	90	1	2	10	20	—	52	DNS
Tour de France	—	—	DNF	20	DNF	25	—	—
Vuelta a España	—	—	—	—	—	—	—	—

Legend
—	Did not compete
DNF	Did not finish
DNS	Did not start

== See also ==
- List of doping cases in cycling

== Bibliography ==
- Fotheringham, William (2003). A Century of Cycling: The Classic Races and Legendary Champions. London: Mitchell Beazley. ISBN 1-84000-654-4.
- Gallagher, Brendan (2017). Corsa Rosa: A History of the Giro d'Italia. London: Bloomsbury. ISBN 978-1-4729-1880-2.
- McGann, Bill; McGann, Carol (2012). The Story of the Giro d'Italia: A Year by Year History of the Tour of Italy. Vol. 2. Cherokee Village: McGann Publishing. ISBN 978-0-9843117-9-8.
- O'Brien, Colin (2018). Giro d'Italia: The Story of the World's Most Beautiful Bike Race. London: Pursuit Books. ISBN 978-1-78125-717-3.
