= Campitello Matese =

- Frazione
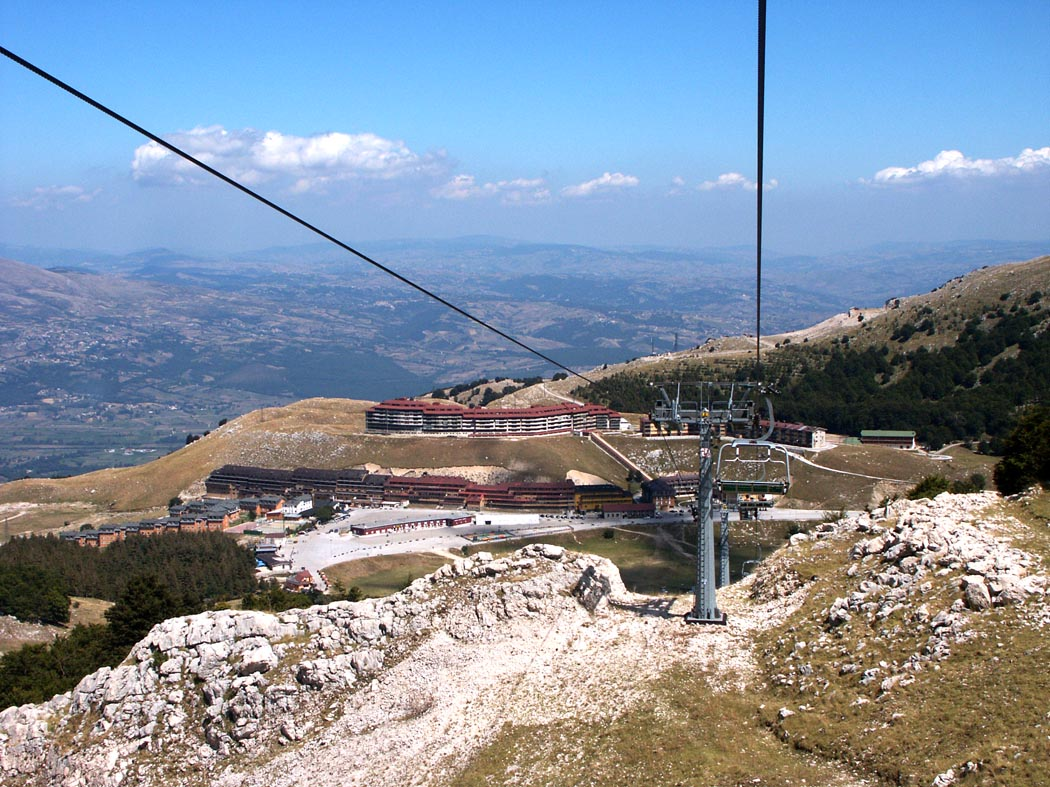

- Location of Campitello Matese in Italy
- Coordinates: 41°27′48″N 14°23′39″E
- Country: Italy
- Region: Molise
- Province: Campobasso (CB)
- Comune: San Massimo
- Elevation: 1,450 m (4,760 ft)

Population (2010)
  - Total: 100
- Demonym: Campitellesi
- Time zone: UTC+1 (CET)
  - Summer (DST): UTC+2 (CEST)
- Postal code: 86027
- Dialing code: 0874
- Website: Official website

Campitello Matese is an Italian civil parish (frazione) and ski resort, part of the municipality of San Massimo in the province of Campobasso, Molise region.

== History ==
Still 1960s Campitello had only a building used as shelter for shepherds. In the 1970s it started the realization of the first plants to transform it in a ski resort.

== Geography ==
Campitello lies nearby Miletto mountain, part of the Matese mountain range, close to the borders of Molise with Campania. Nearest municipalities are San Massimo, Bojano, Cantalupo nel Sannio and San Gregorio Matese (CE, at the southeast side of the mountains.

== Tourism and sport ==
As ski area, Campitello is strongly receptive for Tourism, especially during winter. The resort has got 2 chairlifts and 7 ski plants for a total length of 40 km

Campitello Matese is a location known to cycling fans for being several times during the coming stage of the Giro d'Italia: the first in 1969, the last in 2002. The characteristics of the ascent from San Massimo Campitello (13.5 miles long and 850 m in altitude, average slope of 6.4%) make it one of the most challenging uphill finishes of the Apennines.

Stages of the Giro d'Italia, arriving in Campitello Matese
Year	Stage	Start	Distance	Winner	Race Leader
1969	10	Potenza	254 km (157.8 mi)	Carlo Chiappano (ITA)	Eddy Merckx (BEL)
1982	12	Cava de' Tirreni	171 km (106.3 mi)	Bernard Hinault (FRA)	Bernard Hinault (FRA)
1983	6	Vasto	145 km (90.1 mi)	Alberto Fernández (ESP)	Silvano Contini (ITA)
1988	6	Santa Maria Capua Vetere	137 km (85.1 mi)	Franco Chioccioli (ITA)	Massimo Podenzana (ITA)
1994	4	Montesilvano	204 km (126.8 mi)	Evgeni Berzin (RUS)	Evgeni Berzin (RUS)
2002	11	Benevento	140 km (87.0 mi)	Gilberto Simoni (ITA)	Jens Heppner (GER)
2015	8	Fiuggi	186 km (115.6 mi)	Beñat Intxausti (ESP)	Alberto Contador (ESP)

== See also ==
- List of ski areas and resorts in Italy
