= 1992 La Flèche Wallonne =

Race details
- Dates: 15 April 1992
- Stages: 1
- Distance: 207 km (128.6 mi)
- Winning time: 5h 29' 22"

Results
	Winner	Giorgio Furlan (ITA)	(Ariostea)
	Second	Gérard Rué (FRA)	(Castorama)
	Third	Davide Cassani (ITA)	(Ariostea)

The 1992 La Flèche Wallonne was the 56th edition of La Flèche Wallonne cycle race and was held on 15 April 1992. The race started in Spa and finished in Huy. The race was won by Giorgio Furlan of the Ariostea team.

== General classification ==
Final general classification

Rank	Rider	Team	Time
1	Giorgio Furlan (ITA)	Ariostea	5h 29' 22"
2	Gérard Rué (FRA)	Castorama	+ 9"
3	Davide Cassani (ITA)	Ariostea	+ 16"
4	Viatcheslav Ekimov (RUS)	Panasonic–Sportlife	+ 16"
5	Pedro Delgado (ESP)	Banesto	+ 23"
6	Atle Kvålsvoll (NOR)	Z	+ 30"
7	Luc Roosen (BEL)	Tulip Computers	+ 44"
8	Steven Rooks (NED)	Buckler–Colnago–Decca	+ 58"
9	Moreno Argentin (ITA)	Ariostea	+ 1' 05"
10	Frank Van Den Abeele (BEL)	Lotto–Mavic–MBK	+ 1' 05"
