= 1994 Liège–Bastogne–Liège =

Race details
- Dates: 17 April 1994
- Stages: 1
- Distance: 268.5 km (166.8 mi)
- Winning time: 7h 16' 30"

Results
	Winner	Evgeni Berzin (RUS)	(Gewiss–Ballan)
	Second	Lance Armstrong (USA)	(Motorola)
	Third	Giorgio Furlan (ITA)	(Gewiss–Ballan)

The 1994 Liège–Bastogne–Liège was the 80th edition of the Liège–Bastogne–Liège cycle race and was held on 17 April 1994. The race started in Liège and finished in Ans. The race was won by Evgeni Berzin of the Gewiss–Ballan team.

== General classification ==
Final general classification

Rank	Rider	Team	Time
1	Evgeni Berzin (RUS)	Gewiss–Ballan	7h 16' 30"
2	Lance Armstrong (USA)	Motorola	+ 1' 37"
3	Giorgio Furlan (ITA)	Gewiss–Ballan	+ 1' 37"
4	Claudio Chiappucci (ITA)	Carrera Jeans–Tassoni	+ 1' 37"
5	Stefano Della Santa (ITA)	Mapei–CLAS	+ 1' 37"
6	Tony Rominger (SUI)	Mapei–CLAS	+ 2' 03"
7	Max Sciandri (ITA)	GB–MG Maglificio	+ 5' 38"
8	Marco Saligari (ITA)	GB–MG Maglificio	+ 5' 42"
9	Bruno Cenghialta (ITA)	Gewiss–Ballan	+ 5' 52"
10	Alberto Elli (ITA)	GB–MG Maglificio	+ 5' 58"
