= 1994 Tirreno–Adriatico =

Race details
- Dates: 9–16 March 1994
- Stages: 8
- Distance: 1,315 km (817.1 mi)
- Winning time: 34h 52' 20"

Results
	Winner	Giorgio Furlan (ITA)	(Gewiss–Ballan)
	Second	Evgeni Berzin (RUS)	(Gewiss–Ballan)
	Third	Stefano Colagè (ITA)	(ZG Mobili)

The 1994 Tirreno–Adriatico was the 29th edition of the Tirreno–Adriatico cycle race and was held from 9 March to 16 March 1994. The race started in Nettuno and finished in San Benedetto del Tronto. The race was won by Giorgio Furlan of the Gewiss–Ballan team.

== General classification ==
Final general classification

Rank	Rider	Team	Time
1	Giorgio Furlan (ITA)	Gewiss–Ballan	34h 52' 20"
2	Evgeni Berzin (RUS)	Gewiss–Ballan	+ 47"
3	Stefano Colagè (ITA)	ZG Mobili	+ 53"
4	Alberto Elli (ITA)	GB–MG Maglificio	+ 1' 07"
5	Francesco Casagrande (ITA)	Mercatone Uno–Medeghini	+ 1' 10"
6	Rolf Sørensen (DEN)	GB–MG Maglificio	+ 1' 21"
7	Claudio Chiappucci (ITA)	Carrera Jeans–Tassoni	+ 1' 22"
8	Rodolfo Massi (ITA)	Amore & Vita–Galatron	+ 1' 22"
9	Stefano Della Santa (ITA)	Mapei–CLAS	+ 1' 23"
10	Stefano Zanini (ITA)	Navigare–Blue Storm	+ 1' 24"
