= Marco Pantani =

Italian cyclist (1970–2004)

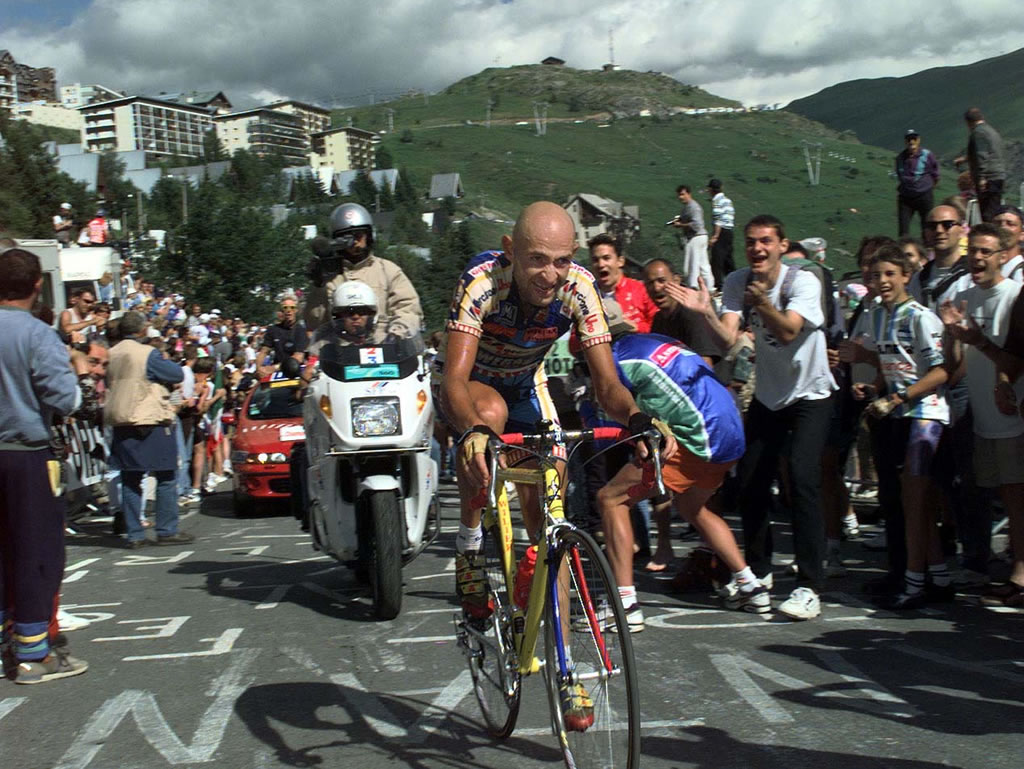
- Pantani climbing Alpe d'Huez in 1997

Personal information
- Full name: Marco Pantani
- Nicknames: Il Pirata ("The Pirate"); Elefantino ("The Little Elephant")
- Born: 13 January 1970 Cesena, Emilia-Romagna, Italy
- Died: 14 February 2004 (aged 34) Rimini, Emilia-Romagna, Italy
- Height: 1.72 m (5 ft 7 1/2 in)
- Weight: 57 kg (126 lb; 9 st 0 lb)

Cycling career
- Sport: Cycling
- Discipline: Road
- Role: Rider
- Rider type: Climber

Amateur teams
- 1989: G.S. Rinascita Ravenna
- 1990–1992: G.S. Giacobazzi-Nonantola

Professional teams
- 1992–1996: Carrera Jeans–Vagabond
- 1997–2003: Mercatone Uno

Major wins
- Grand Tours Tour de France General classification (1998) Young rider classification (1994, 1995) 8 individual stages (1995, 1997, 1998, 2000) Giro d'Italia General classification (1998) Mountains classification (1998) 8 individual stages (1994, 1998, 1999) Stage races Vuelta a Murcia (1999) Other Vélo d'Or (1998)
Medal record
Representing Italy
Men's road bicycle racing
World Championships
Bronze medal – third place	1995 Duitama	Road race

Marco Pantani (Italian: [ˈmarko panˈtaːni]; 13 January 1970 – 14 February 2004) was an Italian road racing cyclist, widely regarded as one of the greatest climbing specialists in the history of the sport by measures of his legacy, credits from other riders, and records. He recorded the fastest climbs up the Tour's iconic venues of Mont Ventoux (46:00) and Alpe d'Huez (36:50), and other cyclists including Lance Armstrong and Charly Gaul have hailed Pantani's climbing skills. He is the second to last rider and one of only eight to ever win the Tour de France – Giro d'Italia double, doing so in 1998. He is the sixth of seven Italians, after Ottavio Bottecchia, Gino Bartali, Fausto Coppi, Gastone Nencini and Felice Gimondi, and before Vincenzo Nibali to win the Tour de France.

Pantani's cycling style was off-the-saddle, and was a relentless climbing style. His early death caused by acute cocaine poisoning in 2004 has further turned the cyclist into a popular icon. The narrative was cultivated by Pantani, who picked the nickname "Il Pirata" (English: "The Pirate") because of his shaven head and the bandana and earrings he wore. At 172 centimetres (5 feet 7 1/2 inches) and 58 kilograms (128 pounds), he was said to have the classic build for a mountain climber. His style has been contrasted with that of time-trialling experts such as the five-time Tour winner Miguel Induráin.

Although Pantani never tested positive during his career, his career was beset by doping allegations. In the 1999 Giro d'Italia, he was expelled due to his irregular blood values. Although he was disqualified for "health reasons", it was implied that Pantani's high haematocrit was the product of EPO use. Following later accusations, Pantani went into a severe depression from which he never fully recovered, ultimately leading to his death in 2004.

== Early life and amateur career ==
Pantani was born on 13 January 1970 in Cesena, Romagna, the son of Ferdinando (referred to as Paolo) and Tonina. He joined the Fausto Coppi cycling club of Cesenatico at the age of eleven. As an amateur, he won the 1992 Girobio, the amateur version of the Giro d'Italia, after finishing third in 1990 and second in 1991.

== Professional career ==
=== 1992–1996: Early years ===
His success at the Girobio led to his turning professional for the remainder of the 1992 season with Davide Boifava's Carrera Jeans–Vagabond. While signing the contract, barely above the minimum established, he asked Boifava what would happen if he were to win the Giro d'Italia or the Tour de France, requesting a change in the contract. He finished 12th in his first professional race, the Gran Premio Città di Camaiore. In 1993, his first full season as a professional, he finished fifth at the mountainous course of Giro del Trentino and debuted at the Giro d'Italia in order to help his team leader, Claudio Chiappucci. He was forced to abandon the race in the 18th stage due to tendinitis.

In 1994, he finished fourth at the Giro del Trentino and the Giro di Toscana before his second participation at the Giro d'Italia, where he was supposed to help Chiappucci. He won two consecutive mountain stages, earning his first victory as a professional in the fourteenth stage to Merano. In the following stage to Aprica, which featured the renowned Stelvio Pass and the Mortirolo Pass, Pantani attacked at the base of Mortirolo and broke free at the Valico di Santa Cristina to win the stage at Aprica and place second in the overall classification. He ultimately finished the race behind Eugeni Berzin but ahead of Miguel Induráin, who had won the two previous Giros. That same year Pantani made his Tour de France debut, coming in third and winning the young rider classification along the way. In 1995, he was hit by a car while training, preventing him from riding the Giro, but he rode the Tour and won stages at Alpe d'Huez and Guzet-Neige. He also finished thirteenth and claimed his second successive best young rider prize. He also won a stage at the Tour de Suisse and finished third in the 1995 World Championships road race in Duitama, Colombia, behind Spaniards Abraham Olano and Miguel Induráin. Shortly after returning to Italy, he collided head-on with a car during the Italian Milano–Torino race, sustaining multiple fractures to the left tibia and fibula, injuries that threatened his career and forced him to miss most of the 1996 season.

=== 1997: Move to Mercatone Uno ===
When Carrera Jeans manufacturers stopped sponsoring the Italian cycling team Carrera Jeans–Tassoni at the end of 1996, a new team based in Italy was formed with Marco Pantani as the team leader. Luciano Pezzi founded Mercatone Uno, taking with him as directeur sportifs Giuseppe Martinelli, Davide Cassani and Alessandro Giannelli and ten of the riders from Carrera. Pantani returned to the Giro in 1997, but he was injured when a black cat caused an accident in front of him during one of the first stages. Even though he completed the stage, he was treated at a hospital for a muscle injury in the same leg he had hurt in 1995. He returned to action at the 1997 Tour de France and won two stages in the Alps, establishing a record time for the climb of Alpe d'Huez and winning two days later at Morzine. Jan Ullrich won, with Pantani third behind Richard Virenque. In 1997, Pantani rode the final 14.5 km to L`Alpe d`Huez in 37'35" minutes, which is the record to this day based on 14.5 km. Since the actual climb is just 13.8 km long, Pantani's time in 1997 was 36'55" minutes based on 13.8 km. His personal record for 13.8 km was in 1995, when he rode the climb in 36'40", which remained the fastest ascent time until Tadej Pogačar broke his record in the 2026 Tour de France with a time of 35'27". Pantani also still holds the third and fourth fastest times at 36'55" in 1997 and 37'15" in 1994, followed by Lance Armstrong at 37'36" in 2004 and Jan Ullrich at 37'41" in 1997.

=== 1998: Giro and Tour wins ===
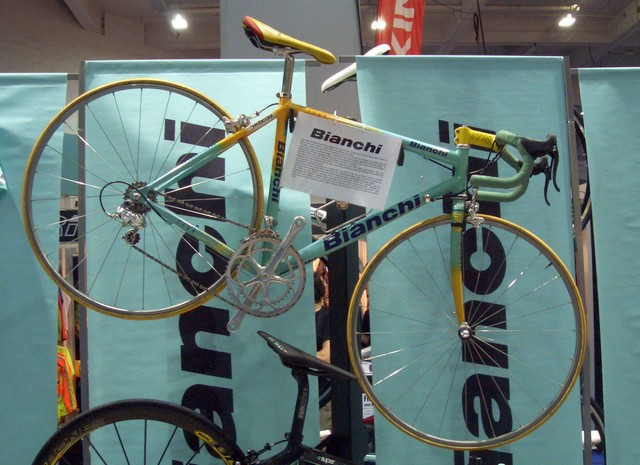
Bike used by Pantani during the 1998 Tour de France

In 1998, Pantani was considered a favorite to win the Giro d'Italia. Other contenders included Alex Zülle, 1996 winner Pavel Tonkov and 1997 winner Ivan Gotti. Zülle won the initial prologue in Nice and also won the sixth stage to Lago Laceno, but Pantani recovered some time in the mountain stage to Piancavallo. Pantani lost further time to his main rivals during the fifteenth stage, an individual time trial in Trieste. By that point, Pantani faced a disadvantage of almost four minutes to Zülle before the Dolomites mountain stages and an individual time trial on the penultimate stage, a discipline that favored Zülle and Tonkov. In the seventeenth stage to Selva di Val Gardena, Pantani took the maglia rosa, the leader's jersey, for the first time in his career after attacking Zülle on the Marmolada climb. Although Pantani crossed the finish line behind Giuseppe Guerini, he finished over four minutes ahead of Zülle, maintaining an advantage of thirty seconds on the general classification over Tonkov, thirty-one seconds on Guerini and over a minute on Zülle. In the following stage to Alpe di Pampeago, he finished second behind Tonkov but maintained the general classification lead over him and gained further time on Zülle and Guerini. In the eighteenth stage to Plan di Montecampione, he repeatedly attacked Tonkov, dropping him in the last three kilometers and winning the stage to face the individual time trial on the penultimate stage with a lead of almost a minute and a half. Zülle lost contact with the favorites in the first climb and ended up losing over thirty minutes. Having won over two minutes on Pantani in the previous time trial, Tonkov was considered superior to Pantani on the time trial discipline, but the Italian finished third in the penultimate stage, gaining an additional five seconds on Tonkov. Pantani was thus able to maintain his lead to win the Giro d'Italia with a minute and a half over Tonkov and more than six minutes over Guerini. He also won the Mountains classification and finished second in the Points classification.

Fans on the roadside of the climb to Les Deux Alpes, awaiting the arrival of the 1998 Tour de France

In the Tour de France, Pantani started the race by finishing 181st of 189 riders in the opening prologue, and losing over four minutes in the first individual time trial to 1997 Tour de France winner Jan Ullrich. Pantani pulled back these early time losses to Ullrich, first in the Pyrenees by taking 23 seconds off Ullrich in the stage to Luchon and winning the stage to Plateau de Beille, where he took an additional minute and forty seconds from Ullrich. Although he was still three minutes behind Ullrich after the Pyrenees, he defeated him by almost nine minutes in the first mountain stage in the Alps, from Grenoble to Les Deux Alpes, via the Col de la Croix de Fer and Col du Galibier. Pantani launched an attack on the ascent of Galibier, forty-eight kilometers from the finish. He stopped to put on a rain jacket at the summit to win on the final ascent to Deux Alpes. Pantani turned his three-minute deficit on Ullrich into a six-minute advantage that he maintained in the following stages to win the Tour de France ahead of Jan Ullrich and Bobby Julich. Pantani became the first Italian since Felice Gimondi in 1965 to win the Tour and the seventh rider in history to achieve the Giro-Tour double, a feat which no one had achieved since Miguel Induráin succeeded in 1993. Until Tadej Pogacar in 2024, Pantani was the last person to win the Giro-Tour double in the same year. Following his success in the Tour, he stated that he may have won the cleanest Tour because of the fear of police following the Festina affair. Although he had just ended what would be his most successful season and he had always dreamed about winning the yellow jersey, he later stated that he felt more alone than ever. French cycling magazine Vélo Magazine awarded him the Vélo d'Or as the best rider of 1998.

=== 1999: Expelled at Madonna di Campiglio ===
In 1999, Pantani started the season by winning a stage and the overall classification of Vuelta a Murcia as well as a stage at the Setmana Catalana de Ciclisme. Pantani was leading the Giro d'Italia, with only one mountain stage left, when a blood test at Madonna di Campiglio showed that he had a 52-per cent hematocrit reading, above the 50-per cent upper limit set by UCI. He was expelled from the race and forced to take a two-week break from racing, with no further action taken. Although the hematocrit test is officially branded as a "health check", a high reading suggests that a rider may have been blood doping with EPO. At the time of his disqualification, Pantani had won four stages and held a comfortable lead of five minutes and thirty-eight seconds over Paolo Savoldelli and also led in the points and mountains classifications. As a result, the entire Mercatone Uno–Bianchi team withdrew from the race. Pantani stayed away from the rest of the year's races.

=== 2000–2003: Late years ===
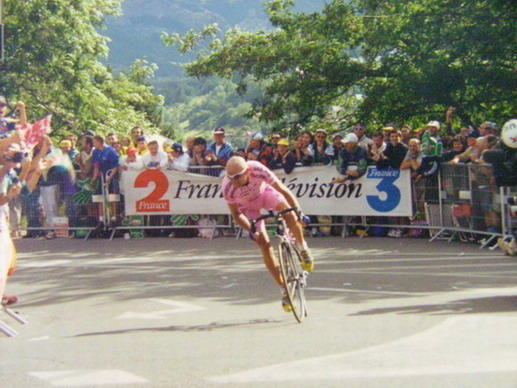
Pantani near Briançon at the 2000 Tour de France

In 2000, he was back in the Giro after deciding to ride only the day before the race started. He lost time and could not attack until the last mountain stage to Briançon, in which he helped his teammate Stefano Garzelli to win. Pantani rode the 2000 Tour de France. He was off the pace in the Pyrenees, but matched Lance Armstrong on Mont Ventoux, leaving the field behind. Armstrong eased and appeared to allow Pantani the stage victory. Pantani said that he felt insulted by the gesture, causing bad feelings between the two which were exacerbated when Armstrong referred to him as Elefantino (Italian for "Little Elephant"), a reference to his prominent ears. In that same Tour, he won another stage, to Courchevel, that turned out to be his last victory as a professional. At that point, he was sixth in the overall classification, facing a disadvantage of nine minutes to Armstrong. On the next stage, which featured the hors catégorie Col de Joux-Plane to Morzine, Pantani broke away with 120 km to go, trying to crush Armstrong, but he suffered stomach problems and withdrew the next day. He never raced the Tour again. Later in the year, he represented Italy in the Sydney Olympics Road Race, finishing 69th.

After that, he raced sporadically in 2001 and 2002, although he was demoralised from doping suspicions and had poor results. During the 2001 Giro d'Italia, Italian police raided the rooms of riders from all 20 teams and a syringe containing traces of insulin was found in Pantani's room. He was banned for eight months by the Italian Cycling Federation but later won an appeal due to an absence of proof. In 2003, Pantani made another comeback in the Giro d'Italia, finishing 14th overall. His best stage result was a fifth position after launching an unsuccessful attack on the slopes of Monte Zoncolan, while he launched his last attacks on the nineteenth stage to Cascata del Toce. It was the last time he rode a professional cycling race. After his team was not invited to the 2003 Tour de France, it was speculated that he would join Bianchi in order to ride the Tour, but he made a plea for privacy in late June following his admission to a psychiatric clinic which specialised in nervous disorders, drug addiction and alcoholism. After being released from the clinic, he was acquitted of a pending court case for sporting fraud regarding his blood values in 1999 Giro d'Italia because doping was not considered a crime in 1999. Pantani told an Italian newspaper that cycling fans had to forget about Pantani as an athlete, while stating that cycling was the last thing on his mind and that he had gained weight.

== Doping ==
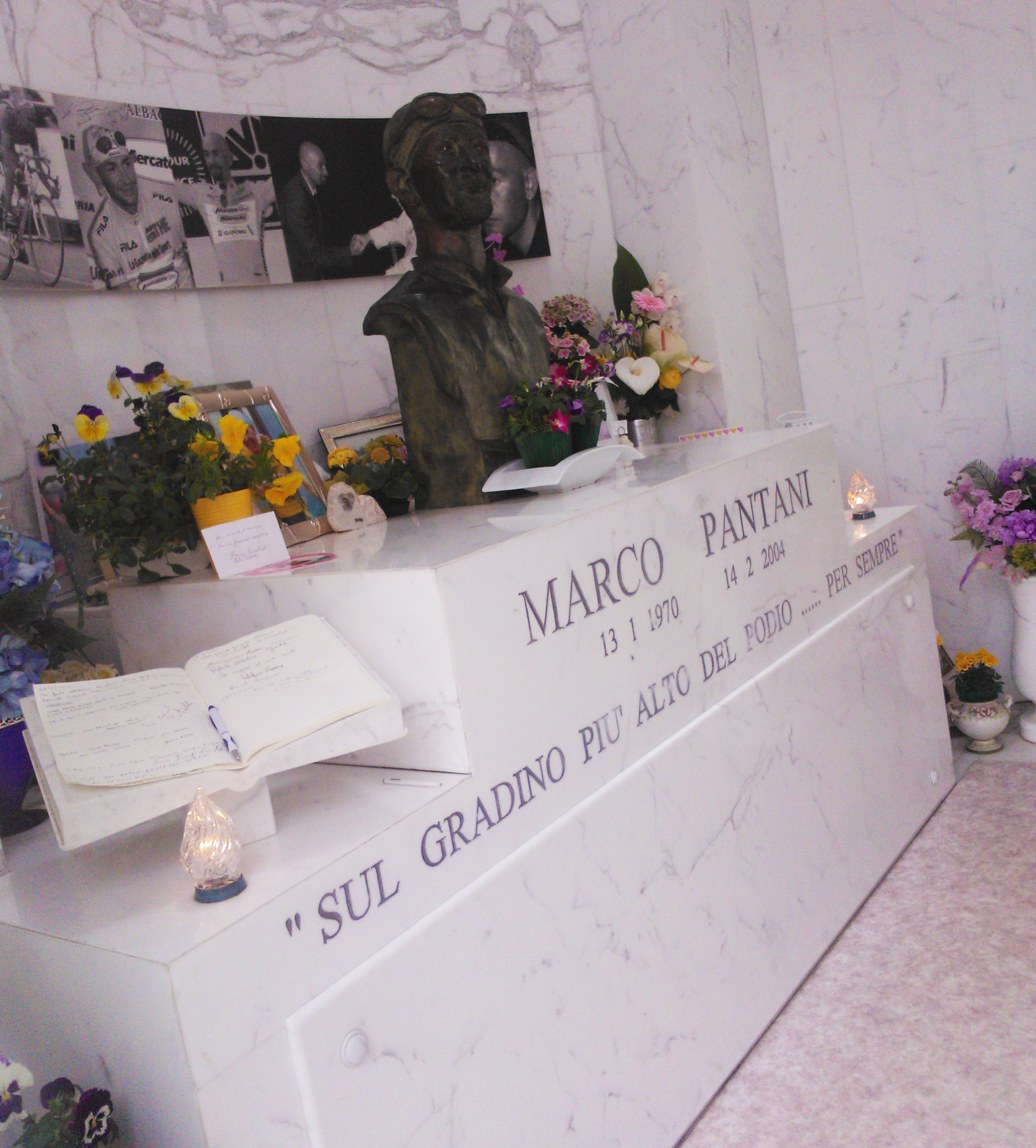
Tomb of Pantani in Cesenatico, Emilia-Romagna, Italy

After being disqualified at the 1999 Giro d'Italia for a hematocrit reading of 52 per cent, above the 50-per cent upper limit set by UCI, Pantani faced persistent allegations of doping throughout the rest of his career. Pantani has never been found using doping and has never been disqualified for doping.

The trial for the 1999 Giro d'Italia irregular blood values began in April 2003 and Pantani was eventually acquitted because doping was not considered a crime by the law at that time. In early June 1999, a few days after Pantani was expelled from the 1999 Giro d'Italia, a court ordered the city of Turin to compensate him for an accident in the 1995 edition of the Milano–Torino that forced Pantani to undergo several surgeries and a long recovery to get back on his bike. A few days later, Italian prosecutor Raffaele Guariniello accused Pantani of a "sporting offence" after he discovered, by looking through trial and medical records, that Pantani's hematocrit after the accident was over 60 per cent. Although the results did not surface until 1999, the UCI had decided to implement blood testing in early 1997, imposing a 50-per cent upper limit for hematocrit. A rider with a value above 50 per cent was given a compulsory two-week suspension. The test was designated as a "health test", although it was administered on suspicion that the athlete was using the banned blood-boosting drug, EPO. During the proceeding, investigators tried to find a reason for Pantani's high hematocrit values, including an hematocrit value of 57.6% recorded on 1 May 1995, at a hospital after he had an accident while training, an investigation in which the doctor pointed out the presence of abnormal hematological values. Upon Guariniello's request to see Pantani's medical record after his accident at the 1997 Giro d'Italia, it was revealed that the blood test results had disappeared from the folder at the hospital and the police did not rule out "intentional removal". Pantani was eventually indicted on a so-called "fraud in sport", but his lawyers argued that Pantani's hematocrit may have been elevated by a combination of training at high altitude in September, suffering from dehydration during the race, trauma of his accident and a margin of error for the sampling method. The original case started in Turin but was moved to Forlì upon Pantani's lawyers' requests. Although he initially received a three-month suspended sentence, Pantani's lawyers appealed and the case was dismissed in late 2001 because the law itself had been passed only in 1999.

In 1999, the Italian newspaper la Repubblica published information that linked Pantani to an investigation on the use of performance-enhancing substances in Italian sports. According to the information released by the newspaper, Francesco Conconi administered EPO to Italian athletes from 1993 to 1998, including Pantani and other cyclists of Carrera. It was revealed that Pantani's name appeared on a file marked "Dblab", seized from Conconi's Biomedical Research Institute at Ferrara, which detailed athlete's hematocrit levels between 1993 and 1995. In 1994, his haematocrit values fluctuated from 40.7% on 16 March, early in the season, to 54.55% on 23 May, during the first stages of the Giro d'Italia. His values reached 58% on 8 June, after winning two stages of the race, and were 57.4% on 27 July, after the Tour de France. In March 1995, his hematocrit values had dropped to 45%, but they reached 56% in July during the Tour de France, where he won two stages; and over 60% in October, after the accident in the Milano–Torino. In 2004, Conconi and his two assistants were acquitted by judge Franca Oliva because the actions were not deemed illegal at the time, although they were deemed "morally guilty" of promoting doping.

During the 2001 Giro d'Italia, a syringe containing traces of insulin was found in Pantani's room. Pantani claimed that the insulin had been planted and that he did not stay in the room that night. In 2002, he was banned for eight months by the Italian Cycling Federation, but he later won an appeal due to an absence of proof.

In 2006, two years after his death, Pantani was linked to the Operación Puerto doping case. According to documentation released by Spanish radio network Cadena SER, Pantani was allegedly given the code name "PTNI" by Eufemiano Fuentes, with a detailed program in 2003, his last season, including EPO, growth hormone, Insulin, Levothroid and IGF-1. Italian newspaper Corriere della Sera indicated that he was administered over 40,000 units of EPO, seven doses of growth hormone, thirty doses of anabolic steroids and four doses of hormones used to treat menopause. In 2006, Jesús Manzano, a Spanish professional road racing cyclist whose statements led the Guardia Civil to conduct the Operación Puerto investigation, disclosed in an interview with French television channel France 3 that Pantani was a client of Fuentes.

On the penultimate stage of 1998 Giro d'Italia, Pantani's teammate Riccardo Forconi was expelled from the race for an haematocrit value above 50 per cent. Ivano Fanini, the manager of Amore & Vita–Giubileo 2000–Beretta, suggested during the early stages of 1999 Giro d'Italia that Pantani and Forconi had exchanged their blood samples in order to avoid Pantani's disqualification. According to Fanini, Forconi's haematocrit value was only 47 per cent the previous day. In 2008, Fanini further claimed that Forconi had received a house for the exchange but Forconi refuted these claims.

Matt Rendell's biography of Pantani suggests he used recombinant erythropoietin (rEPO) throughout his professional career. It alleges that seasonal hematocrit levels from several sources showed variations which exceeded those possible naturally, and that Pantani's main victories were probably won also thanks to blood hematocrit levels which could have been up to 60%.

A French senate report into doping released in July 2013 conjectured that Pantani, Jan Ullrich, Bobby Julich, Erik Zabel, Jacky Durand, and Laurent Desbiens had tested positive for EPO during retroactive testing of samples from the 1998 Tour de France conducted in 2004 but the tests aren't valid because the samples taken didn't conform to antidoping standards.

== Death ==
Shrine to Pantani on the Mortirolo Pass erected by the Italian Professional Riders Association

In the early evening of 14 February 2004, Pantani was found dead at a hotel in Rimini, Italy. An autopsy revealed he had cerebral edema and heart failure, and a coroner's inquest revealed acute cocaine poisoning. Pantani spent the last days of his life isolated from his friends and family and barricaded himself inside his hotel room. Pantani's ex-girlfriend Christina Jonsson, in an April 2004 interview to Swiss news magazine L'Hebdo, indicated that following his expulsion from the 1999 Giro d'Italia, Pantani had confessed to her he had started using cocaine. In 2008, Fabio Carlino was convicted of supplying Pantani with a dose of ultra-pure cocaine that caused his death. The conviction was overturned in 2011 by the Court of Cassation after the acting Prosecutor expressed doubts regarding the verdict, while stating that he "had the impression that the exaggerated media publicity surrounding Mr. Pantani's death led the judges to an excessive attribution of responsibility." In 2016 the case was opened again, but shelved, and then yet again; with Italian prosecutors citing about fifty pages of new evidence to consider, in November 2021.

Pantani was buried in his hometown, Cesenatico. Twenty thousand mourners were at his funeral, which was attended by Franco Ballerini, Alberto Tomba, Azeglio Vicini, Mario Cipollini and Diego Maradona among others. During the funeral, his manager Manuela Ronchi read notes that Pantani had written in his passport during a trip to Cuba:

For four years I've been in every court, I just lost my desire to be like all the other sportsmen, but cycling has paid and many youngsters have lost their faith in justice. All my colleagues have been humiliated, with TV cameras hidden in their hotel rooms to try and ruin families. How could you not hurt yourself after that?

Miguel Induráin, five-times Tour de France winner, praised Pantani by saying: "He got people hooked on the sport. There may be riders who have achieved more than him, but they never succeeded in drawing in the fans like he did."

== Legacy ==
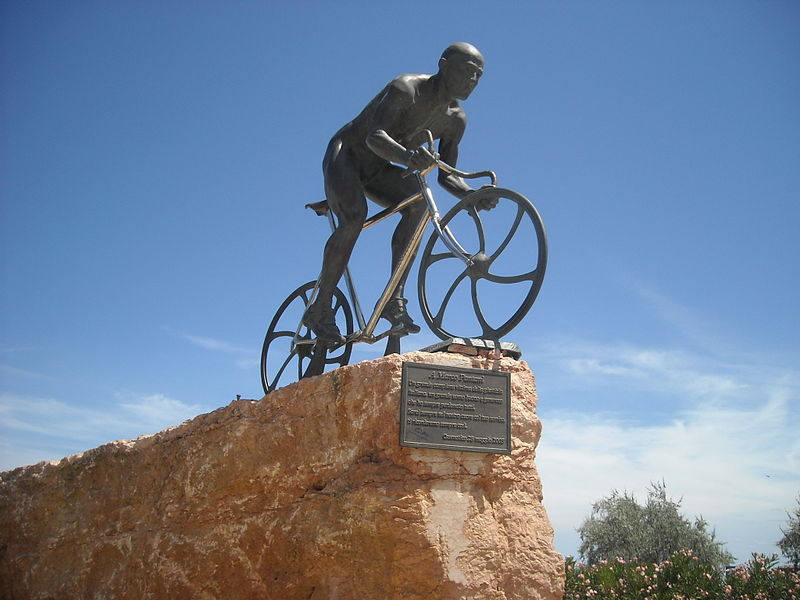
Statue dedicated to Pantani at Cesenatico

In the years following his death, Pantani was the subject of several articles, books, songs and a film. Biographies and accounts on the life of Pantani have been written by sports journalists John Wilcockson and Matt Rendell, among others. Manuela Ronchi, Pantani's manager for five years, published an account on the last few years of Pantani's life titled Man on the Run. His mother Tonina Pantani also published a book in 2008 titled Era mio figlio (He Was My Son). A graphic novel titled Gli ultimi giorni di Marco Pantani (The Last Days of Marco Pantani) was released in 2011, chronicling the events that led up to Pantani's death. It was based on a book published by French journalist Philippe Brunel, a friend of Pantani, suggesting that Pantani may have been murdered. Italian television RAI aired a television film in 2007 titled Il Pirata: Marco Pantani, a biographical film which starred Rolando Ravello as Marco Pantani. A documentary on Pantani's life titled Pantani: The Accidental Death of a Cyclist was released in May 2014 in cinemas.

The Memorial Marco Pantani has been organised annually since 2004 in his memory. The race starts in Cesenatico, Pantani's hometown, and follows a route towards his birthplace, Cesena. Giro d'Italia's organisers decided to dedicate a mountain pass to Pantani's memory every year. In the 2004 edition, the first Cima Pantani was Mortirolo Pass, a mountain that played a key role in Pantani's history. When Mortirolo was included in the Giro for the third time in 1994, Pantani attacked and left everyone behind to earn a win at Aprica. The 16th stage of 2004 Tour de France was dedicated to Pantani's memory. This stage was an individual time trial up to Alpe d'Huez, where Marco Pantani won in 1995 and 1997.

A number of monuments and memorials have been erected in his honor at, among other places, Mortirolo Pass, Colle Fauniera, Col du Galibier, Poggio Murella in Tuscany where he had a house, and his hometown Cesenatico.

== Career achievements ==
=== Major results ===
1990
3rd Overall Girobio
1991
2nd Overall Girobio

1st Stage 10

2nd Gran Premio di Poggiana
1992
1st Overall Girobio

1st Stages 9 & 10

1993
5th Overall Giro del Trentino
6th GP Industria & Artigianato di Larciano
9th Giro della Provincia di Reggio Calabria
1994
2nd Overall Giro d'Italia

1st Stages 14 & 15

3rd Overall Tour de France

1st Young rider classification

4th Overall Giro del Trentino
4th Giro di Toscana
4th GP Industria & Artigianato di Larciano
6th Gran Premio Industria e Commercio di Prato
1995
Tour de France

1st Young rider classification
1st Stages 10 & 14

1st Stage 8 Tour de Suisse
3rd Road race, UCI Road World Championships
3rd Polynormande
5th Giro dell'Appennino
6th Subida a Urkiola
7th Gran Premio Città di Camaiore
1997
2nd Overall À travers Lausanne
3rd Overall Tour de France

1st Stages 13 & 15

3rd Overall Tour of the Basque Country
4th Overall Critérium International
5th La Flèche Wallonne
8th Liège–Bastogne–Liège
10th Overall Setmana Catalana de Ciclisme
1998
1st Overall Tour de France

1st Stages 11 & 15

1st Overall Giro d'Italia

1st Mountains classification
1st Stages 14 & 19

1st Overall À travers Lausanne

1st Stages 1 (ITT) & 2 (ITT)

1st Circuit de l'Aulne
3rd Overall Vuelta a Murcia

1st Mountains classification
1st Stage 4a

4th Overall Giro del Trentino
9th Breitling Grand Prix (with Massimo Podenzana)
1999
1st Overall Vuelta a Murcia

1st Mountains classification
1st Stage 4

Giro d'Italia

1st Stages 8, 15, 19 & 20

1st Stage 2 Setmana Catalana de Ciclisme
3rd Overall Giro del Trentino
8th Overall Tour of the Basque Country
8th Clásica de Almería
2000
Tour de France

1st Stages 12 & 15

2003
10th Overall Settimana Internazionale di Coppi e Bartali

=== Grand Tour general classification results timeline ===
Grand Tour	1993	1994	1995	1996	1997	1998	1999	2000	2001	2002	2003
Giro d'Italia	DNF	2	—	—	DNF	1	DNF	28	DNF	DNF	14
Tour de France	—	3	13	—	3	1	—	DNF	—	—	—
Vuelta a España	—	—	DNF	—	—	—	—	—	DNF	—	—

Legend
—	Did not compete
DNF	Did not finish

=== Awards ===
- Vélo d'Or: 1998

== See also ==
- Pink jersey statistics
- Yellow jersey statistics
- List of Grand Tour general classification winners
- List of Giro d'Italia general classification winners
- List of Giro d'Italia classification winners
- List of Tour de France general classification winners
- List of Tour de France secondary classification winners
- List of doping cases in cycling
