= 1995 Tour of the Basque Country =

Race details
- Dates: 3–7 April 1995
- Stages: 5
- Distance: 799 km (496.5 mi)
- Winning time: 19h 54' 28"

Results
	Winner	Alex Zülle (SUI)	(ONCE)
	Second	Laurent Jalabert (FRA)	(ONCE)
	Third	Tony Rominger (SUI)	(Mapei–GB–Latexco)

The 1995 Tour of the Basque Country was the 35th edition of the Tour of the Basque Country cycle race and was held from 3 April to 7 April 1995. The race started in Zegama and finished at Jaizkibel. The race was won by Alex Zülle of the ONCE team.

== General classification ==
Final general classification

Rank	Rider	Team	Time
1	Alex Zülle (SUI)	ONCE	19h 54' 28"
2	Laurent Jalabert (FRA)	ONCE	+ 1' 16"
3	Tony Rominger (SUI)	Mapei–GB–Latexco	+ 2' 25"
4	Evgeni Berzin (RUS)	Gewiss–Ballan	+ 2' 30"
5	Davide Rebellin (ITA)	MG Maglificio–Technogym	+ 2' 36"
6	Fernando Escartín (ESP)	Mapei–GB–Latexco	+ 2' 42"
7	Mauro Gianetti (SUI)	Polti–Granarolo–Santini	+ 3' 03"
8	Francesco Frattini (ITA)	Gewiss–Ballan	+ 3' 07"
9	Alfredo Irusta (ESP)	Castellblanch	+ 3' 11"
10	José María Jiménez (ESP)	Banesto	+ 3' 18"
