= 1996 Tour de Suisse =

Race details
- Dates: 11–20 June 1996
- Stages: 9 + prologue
- Distance: 1,652 km (1,027 mi)
- Winning time: 41h 36' 30"

Results
	Winner	Peter Luttenberger (AUT)	(Carrera Jeans–Tassoni)
	Second	Gianni Faresin (ITA)	(Panaria–Vinavil)
	Third	Gianni Bugno (ITA)	(MG Maglificio–Technogym)
	Points	Gianni Bugno (ITA)	(MG Maglificio–Technogym)
	Mountains	Andrey Teteryuk (KAZ)	(Aki–Gipiemme)
	Combination	Gianni Bugno (ITA)	(MG Maglificio–Technogym)
	Team	Amore & Vita–ForzArcore	

The 1996 Tour de Suisse was the 60th edition of the Tour de Suisse cycle race and was held from 11 June to 20 June 1996. The race started in Wil and finished in Zürich. The race was won by Peter Luttenberger of the Carrera team.

== General classification ==
Final general classification

Rank	Rider	Team	Time
1	Peter Luttenberger (AUT)	Carrera Jeans–Tassoni	41h 36' 30"
2	Gianni Faresin (ITA)	Panaria–Vinavil	+ 15"
3	Gianni Bugno (ITA)	MG Maglificio–Technogym	+ 1' 15"
4	Evgeni Berzin (RUS)	Gewiss Playbus	+ 1' 16"
5	Riccardo Forconi (ITA)	Amore & Vita–ForzArcore	+ 2' 01"
6	Alberto Elli (ITA)	MG Maglificio–Technogym	+ 3' 08"
7	Udo Bölts (GER)	Team Telekom	+ 4' 10"
8	Marco Vergnani (ITA)	Amore & Vita–ForzArcore	+ 8' 05"
9	Armin Meier (SUI)	PMU Romand–Bepsa	+ 9' 52"
10	Stefano Checchin (ITA)	Carrera Jeans–Tassoni	+ 16' 07"
