= 1994 Giro del Trentino =

Race details
- Dates: 10–13 May 1994
- Stages: 4
- Distance: 674 km (418.8 mi)
- Winning time: 18h 15' 45"

Results
	Winner	Moreno Argentin (ITA)
	Second	Evgeni Berzin (RUS)
	Third	Francesco Casagrande (ITA)

The 1994 Giro del Trentino was the 18th edition of the Tour of the Alps cycle race and was held on 10 May to 13 May 1994. The race started in Arco and finished in Riva del Garda. The race was won by Moreno Argentin.

== General classification ==
Final general classification

Rank	Rider	Time
1	Moreno Argentin (ITA)	18h 15' 45"
2	Evgeni Berzin (RUS)	+ 19"
3	Francesco Casagrande (ITA)	+ 28"
4	Marco Pantani (ITA)	+ 31"
5	Nelson Rodríguez (COL)	+ 35"
6	Armand de Las Cuevas (FRA)	+ 1' 04"
7	Michele Bartoli (ITA)	+ 1' 35"
8	Davide Rebellin (ITA)	+ 1' 48"
9	Claudio Chiappucci (ITA)	+ 1' 49"
10	Enrico Zaina (ITA)	+ 1' 59"
