= 1997 Tour of the Basque Country =

Race details
- Dates: 7–11 April 1997
- Stages: 5
- Distance: 859.5 km (534.1 mi)
- Winning time: 22h 36' 40"

Results
	Winner	Alex Zülle (SUI)	(ONCE)
	Second	Laurent Jalabert (FRA)	(ONCE)
	Third	Marco Pantani (ITA)	(Mercatone Uno)

The 1997 Tour of the Basque Country was the 37th edition of the Tour of the Basque Country cycle race and was held from 7 April to 11 April 1997. The race started in Legazpi and finished at Gatzaga. The race was won by Alex Zülle of the ONCE team.

== General classification ==
Final general classification

Rank	Rider	Team	Time
1	Alex Zülle (SUI)	ONCE	22h 36' 40"
2	Laurent Jalabert (FRA)	ONCE	+ 32"
3	Marco Pantani (ITA)	Mercatone Uno	+ 44"
4	Marcelino García (ESP)	ONCE	+ 1' 01"
5	Chris Boardman (GBR)	GAN	+ 1' 16"
6	Mikel Zarrabeitia (ESP)	ONCE	+ 1' 24"
7	Luc Leblanc (FRA)	Team Polti	+ 1' 33"
8	Abraham Olano (ESP)	Banesto	+ 1' 33"
9	Gianni Faresin (ITA)	Mapei–GB	+ 1' 35"
10	Pascal Hervé (FRA)	Festina–Lotus	+ 1' 39"
