= 1994 Giro d'Italia =

Cycling race in Italy

Race details
- Dates: 22 May – 12 June 1994
- Stages: 22, including one split stage
- Distance: 3,730 km (2,318 mi)
- Winning time: 100h 41' 21"

Results
Jersey awarded to the overall winner	Winner	Evgeni Berzin (RUS)	(Gewiss–Ballan)
	Second	Marco Pantani (ITA)	(Carrera Jeans–Tassoni)
	Third	Miguel Induráin (ESP)	(Banesto)
Jersey awarded to the points classification winner	Points	Djamolidine Abdoujaparov (UZB)	(Team Polti–Vaporetto)
Jersey awarded to the mountains classification winner	Mountains	Pascal Richard (SUI)	(GB–MG Maglificio)
Jersey awarded to the youth classification winner	Youth	Evgeni Berzin (RUS)	(Gewiss–Ballan)
Jersey awarded to the intergiro classification winner	Intergiro	Djamolidine Abdoujaparov (UZB)	(Team Polti–Vaporetto)
	Team	Carrera Jeans–Tassoni	
	Team points	Team Polti–Vaporetto	

The 1994 Giro d'Italia was the 77th edition of the race. The Giro started off in Bologna on 22 May with a short 86 km (53.4 mi) stage. The race came to a close on 12 June with a flat stage that stretched 198 km (123.0 mi) from Turin to Milan. Seventeen teams entered the race, which was won by Evgeni Berzin of the Gewiss–Ballan team. Second and third respectively were the Italian Marco Pantani and the Spanish rider, Miguel Induráin.

Berzin first gained the race lead after the fourth stage where he attacked on the final climb to win the day. The race's overall classification was first headed by Endrio Leoni who won the Giro's opening road stage. However, Leoni lost the lead later that day during the afternoon individual time trial to Armand de Las Cuevas. De Las Cuevas held the lead for a single stage before losing it to Moreno Argentin who won the race's second stage. Argentin held the general classification lead for two stages, before Berzin took it after stage 4. After gaining the lead, Berzin began to build upon his advantage after winning the stage 8 and 18 individual time trials and maintaining good form throughout the mountains.

Berzin became the first Russian to win the Giro d'Italia. Berzin also won the young rider classification for the best rider aged 25 or under in the general classification. In the race's other classifications, Swiss rider Pascal Richard won the mountains classification, and Djamolidine Abdoujaparov of Team Polti–Vaporetto was the winner of the points and intergiro classifications. Carrera Jeans–Tassoni finished as the winners of the team classification, which ranked each of the seventeen teams contesting the race by lowest cumulative time. Team Polti–Vaporetto finished as the winners of the team points classification, where the teams' riders are awarded points for placing within the top twenty in each stage.

== Teams ==
A total of 18 teams were invited to participate in the 1994 Giro d'Italia, of which 17 participated. Each team sent a squad of nine riders, so the Giro began with a peloton of 153 cyclists. Italy had the most riders participating with 80, while Germany (12) was the only country representation by more than 10 riders. Of these, 37 were riding the Giro d'Italia for the first time. The average age of riders was 27.95 years, ranging from 21–year–old Heinrich Trumheller (Castorama) to 36–year–old Bruno Leali (Brescialat–Ceramiche Refin). The team with the youngest average rider age was Lampre–Panaria (26), while the oldest was Brescialat–Ceramiche Refin (30). The presentation of the teams – where each team's roster and manager were introduced in front the media and local dignitaries – took place on 22 May, in the courtyard of the Bologna. Of the riders that started this edition of the Giro d'Italia, a total of 99 riders made it to the finish in Milan.

The teams entering the race were:

- Amore & Vita–Galatron
- Banesto
- Brescialat–Ceramiche Refin
- Carrera Jeans–Tassoni
- Castorama
- GB–MG Maglificio
- Gewiss–Ballan
- Jolly Componibili–Cage
- Kelme–Avianca–Gios
- Lampre–Panaria
- Mapei–CLAS
- Mercatone Uno–Medeghini
- Motorola
- Navigare–Blue Storm
- Team Polti–Vaporetto
- Team Telekom
- ZG Mobili–Selle Italia

== Pre-race favorites ==
The starting peloton included 1993 winner, Miguel Induráin, who came into the race having only raced twenty days during the season according to author Bill McGann. In addition, there were reports surfacing before the race that Indurain's knee was troubling him. The race did not feature Tony Rominger, who elected to ride the Vuelta a España instead. El País writer Carlos Arribas felt that Evgeni Berzin had a strong spring with his victory in Liège–Bastogne–Liège and second-place finish in the Tour of the Basque Country. Arribas felt that Russian Pavel Tonkov, who had won the young rider classification the previous two years, would challenge for the victory as his normal team leader, Maurizio Fondriest, was absent from the race due to injury.

Avui's Adrian R. Huber believed that Djamolidine Abdoujaparov, Adriano Baffi, and Fabio Baldato had a great chance to win a stage in the race. Notable sprinter Mario Cipollini did not participate in the race as he was still recovering from injuries sustained in the second stage at the Vuelta a España.

== Route and stages ==
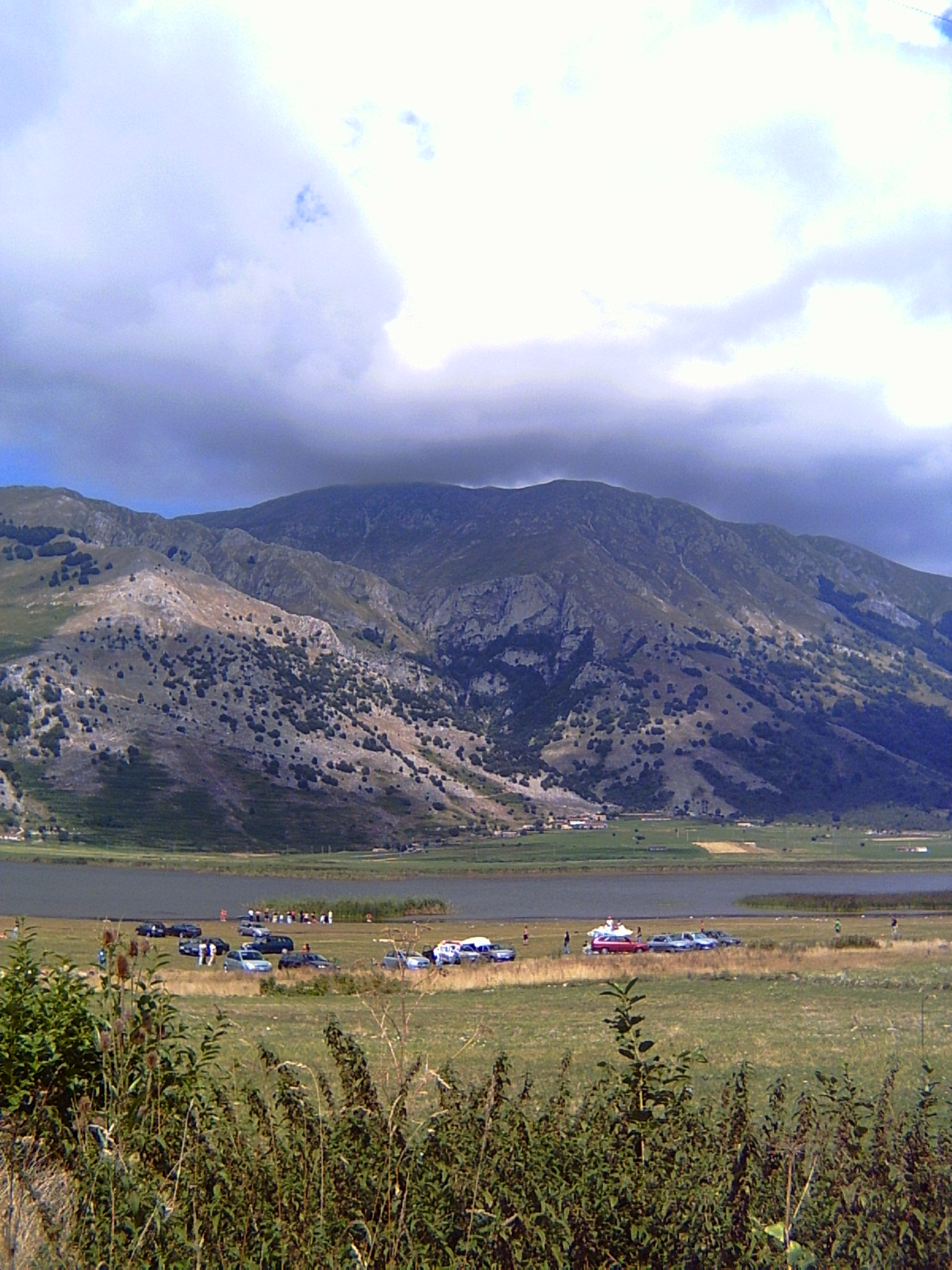
The 204 km (127 mi) fourth stage that began in Montesilvano had a summit finish atop Campitello Matese (pictured).

The route for the 1994 Giro d'Italia was unveiled by race director Carmine Castellano on 13 November 13, 1993, in Milan. The race route was leaked to the press before Castellano held the official presentation. It contained three time trial events, all of which were individual. There were ten stages containing high mountains, of which three had summit finishes: stage 4, to Campitello Matese; stage 20, to Les Deux Alpes; and stage 21, to Sestriere. Another stage with a mountain-top finish was stage 18, which consisted of a climbing time trial to the summit of the Passo dello Bocco. In total, the race featured 25,800 m (84,646 ft) of climbing. The organizers chose to include no rest days. When compared to the previous year's race, the race was 28 km (17 mi) longer, contained one less rest day, and one more stage. The race was televised in Italy by Mediaset TV.

There were five stages that began or ended outside of Italy. Stage 12 ended in the Slovenian city Kranj and served as the start for the race's thirteenth stage. Stage 13 ended at Lienz in Austria, and the fourteenth began there. The Giro's mountainous stage 20 ended on the slopes of Les Deux Alpes, and the penultimate stage began on the mountain the next day.

Stage characteristics and results
Stage	Date	Course	Distance	Type	Winner
1a	22 May	Bologna to Bologna	86 km (53 mi)	Plain stage	Endrio Leoni (ITA)
1b	22 May	Bologna	7 km (4 mi)	Individual time trial	Armand de Las Cuevas (FRA)
2	23 May	Bologna to Osimo	232 km (144 mi)	Stage with mountain(s)	Moreno Argentin (ITA)
3	24 May	Osimo to Loreto Aprutino	185 km (115 mi)	Stage with mountain(s)	Gianni Bugno (ITA)
4	25 May	Montesilvano to Campitello Matese	204 km (127 mi)	Stage with mountain(s)	Evgeni Berzin (RUS)
5	26 May	Campobasso to Melfi	158 km (98 mi)	Plain stage	Endrio Leoni (ITA)
6	27 May	Potenza to Caserta	215 km (134 mi)	Plain stage	Marco Saligari (ITA)
7	28 May	Fiuggi to Fiuggi	119 km (74 mi)	Stage with mountain(s)	Laudelino Cubino (ESP)
8	29 May	Grosseto to Follonica	44 km (27 mi)	Individual time trial	Evgeni Berzin (RUS)
9	30 May	Castiglione della Pescaia to Pontedera	153 km (95 mi)	Plain stage	Ján Svorada (SVK)
10	31 May	Marostica to Marostica	115 km (71 mi)	Plain stage	Djamolidine Abdoujaparov (UZB)
11	1 June	Marostica to Bibione	165 km (103 mi)	Plain stage	Ján Svorada (SVK)
12	2 June	Bibione to Kranj (Slovenia)	204 km (127 mi)	Stage with mountain(s)	Andrea Ferrigato (ITA)
13	3 June	Kranj (Slovenia) to Lienz (Austria)	231 km (144 mi)	Stage with mountain(s)	Michele Bartoli (ITA)
14	4 June	Lienz (Austria) to Merano	235 km (146 mi)	Stage with mountain(s)	Marco Pantani (ITA)
15	5 June	Merano to Aprica	195 km (121 mi)	Stage with mountain(s)	Marco Pantani (ITA)
16	6 June	Sondrio to Stradella	220 km (137 mi)	Plain stage	Maximilian Sciandri (ITA)
17	7 June	Santa Maria della Versa to Lavagna	190 km (118 mi)	Plain stage	Ján Svorada (SVK)
18	8 June	Chiavari to Passo del Bocco	35 km (22 mi)	Individual time trial	Evgeni Berzin (RUS)
19	9 June	Lavagna to Bra	212 km (132 mi)	Plain stage	Massimo Ghirotto (ITA)
20	10 June	Cuneo to Les Deux Alpes (France)	206 km (128 mi)	Stage with mountain(s)	Vladimir Poulnikov (UKR)
21	11 June	Les Deux Alpes (France) to Sestriere	121 km (75 mi)	Stage with mountain(s)	Pascal Richard (SUI)
22	12 June	Turin to Milan	198 km (123 mi)	Plain stage	Stefano Zanini (ITA)
	Total		3,730 km (2,318 mi)		

== Race overview ==
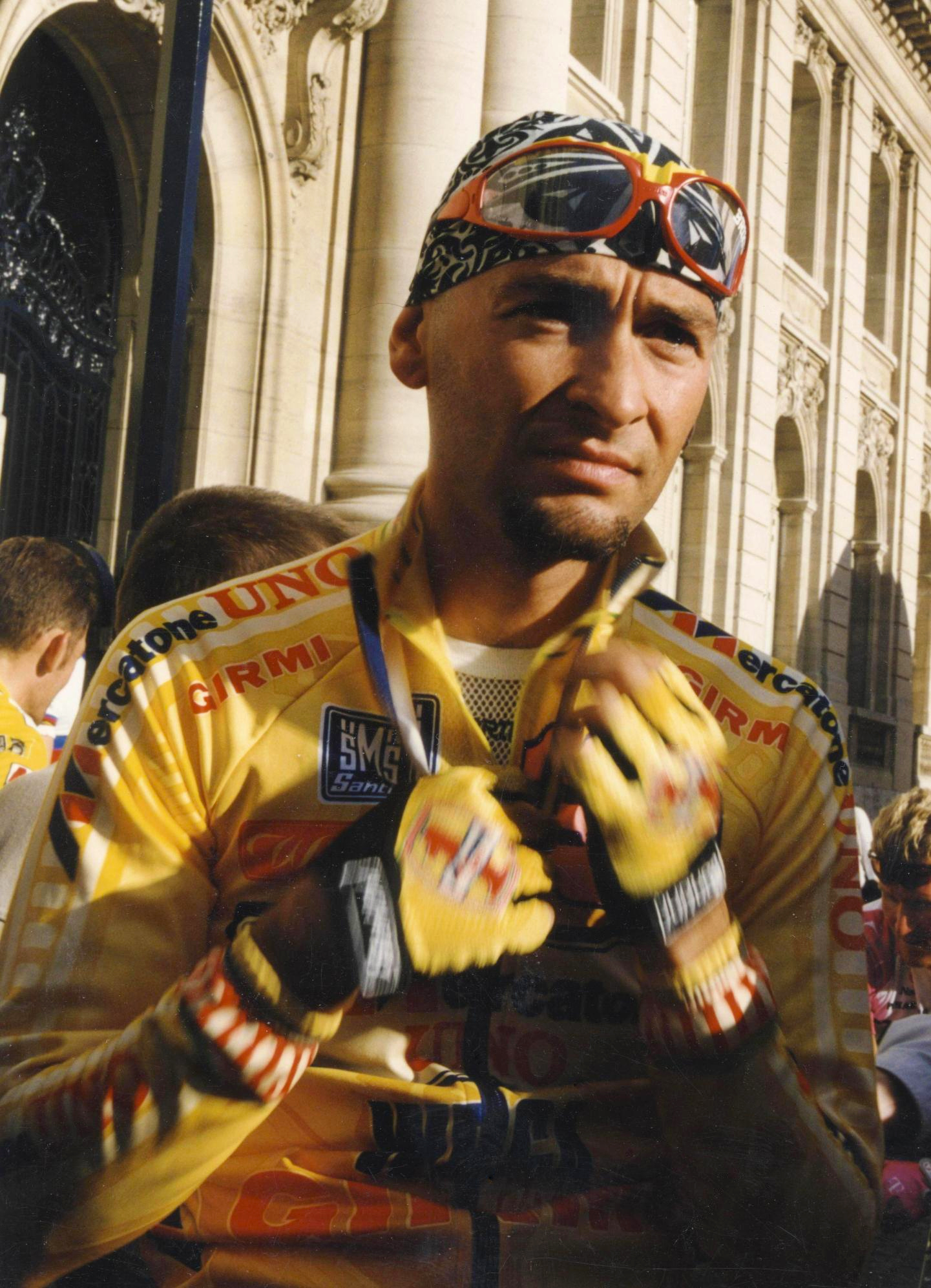
Marco Pantani won two consecutive stages at the 1994 Giro d'Italia.

This edition of the Giro began with a split stage, with the morning leg consisting of a 86 km (53 mi) flat route and the afternoon part being a 7 km (4 mi) flat individual time trial. Italian Endrio Leoni won the morning stage by means of a sprint finish where the speeds were so high the peloton split in the final kilometer. Armand de Las Cuevas won the afternoon time trial by two seconds over Evgeni Berzin and in the process took the overall lead away from Leoni. Stage two featured an uphill finish into the city of Osimo. Moreno Argentin attacked close to the line and was able to distance himself from the rest of the peloton and win the stage, while also taking the lead of the race. Gianni Bugno failed several times to get away from the peloton before finally breaking free on the climb into Loreto Amprutino to win the third stage.

Stage 4 featured the race's first summit finish, with a final climb to the top of Campitello Matese. While on the climb, Evgeni Berzin attacked and made his way up to the top in first place. Due to his efforts, Berzin gained the overall lead of the race. The next two stages, 5 and 6, both came down to sprint finishes that were won by Endrio Leoni and Marco Saligari, respectively. The race's seventh stage saw the Spaniard Laudelino Cubino outsprint his fellow breakaway members for the stage victory. Stage 8 was a 44 km (27 mi) individual time trial that stretched from Grosseto to Follonica. The race leader Evgeni Berzin dominated the time trial as he won the stage by over a minute than the second-place finisher, which also allowed him to extend his lead in the general classification.

The next three stages of the race were all primarily flat, had no real impact on the overall standings, and all concluded with a bunch sprint. Ján Svorada won stage nine and then stage eleven after dodging a crash that marred the stage's finish. Djamolidine Abdoujaparov out-sprinted the rest of the field to win the race's tenth stage. The Giro's twelfth stage featured a few categorized climbs as the race made its way into Slovenia for the stage's finish in Kranj. Despite the climbs, the stage ended with a field sprint that was won by Andrea Ferrigato. Italian Michele Bartoli won the race's undulating thirteenth stage by being a part of the stage's initial breakaway and then attacking later on and soloing to the stage's conclusion in Lienz, Austria.

As the Giro left Austria, the race began to enter the Dolomites during stage fourteen. The eventual stage winner Marco Pantani was in a chasing group on the final climb of the stage, the Passo di Monte Giovo. He attacked, bridged the gap to the leading group, and left them behind to claim his first professional victory of his career. The next stage saw Pantani win again after he rode away from the attack group on the last climb of the Valico di Santa Cristina and he then soloed to the finish in Aprica. Pantani's efforts on the day moved him up to second overall in the race. The race's sixteenth stage took a break from the mountains with the stage being primarily fled, which ultimately led to the sprint finish that was won by Italian Maximilian Sciandri. Ján Svorada won the next day's stage after attacking from the breakaway group in the closing seconds.

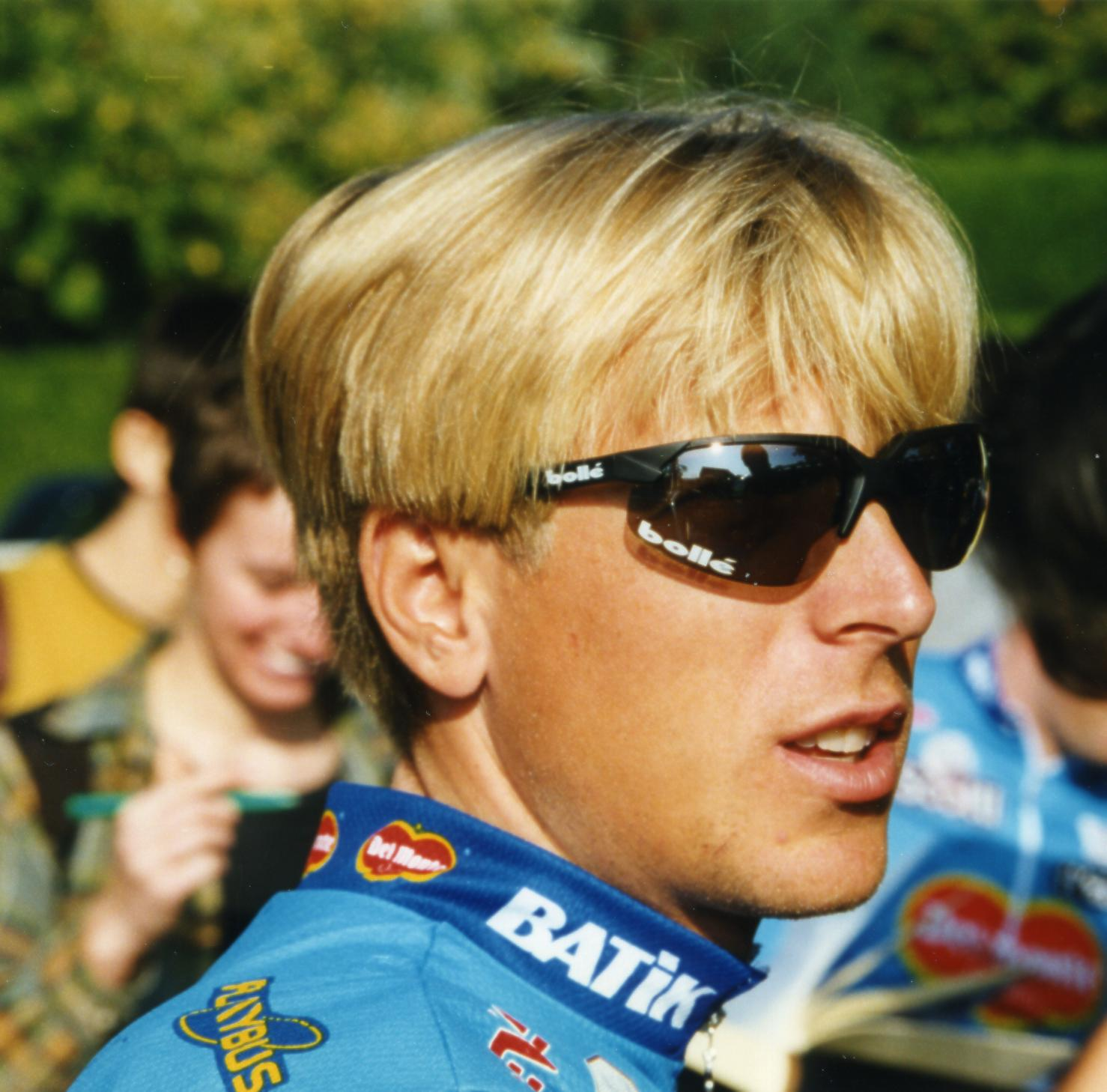
Evgeni Berzin won three stages and the general classification.

The Giro's eighteenth stage was a 35 km (22 mi) individual time trial that stretched from Chiavari to the summit finish on the Passo del Bocco. The race leader Evgeni Berzin won the stage by twenty seconds over Miguel Induráin. Stage 19 saw the day of racing come down to a sprint finish that was won by Massimo Ghirotto. The twentieth stage saw the Giro race through the Alps and up to the summit of Les Deux Alpes for the stage finish. The lead group up Les Deux Alpes contained the likes of Evgeni Berzin, Marco Pantani, and Miguel Induráin who had attacked each other multiple times but to no avail. The trio was later joined by Vladimir Poulnikov and Nelson Rodríguez who both eventually left them to go on for the stage win. Poulkinov edged out Rodriguez to the stage win atop the mountain. The penultimate stage of the Giro saw a summit finish atop the Sestriere. The stage saw snow and chilling temperatures which led to the general classification contenders sticking together, while Pascal Richard went on to win the summit finish and solidify his lead atop the mountains classification. The Giro's final stage came down to a sprint finish that was won by Stefano Zanini as Evgeni Berzin won the Giro d'Italia.

Success in stages was limited to eleven of the competing teams, six of which achieved multiple stage victories, while four individual riders won multiple stages. The riders that won more than once were Endrio Leoni in stages 1a and 5, Evgeni Berzin in stages 4, 8, and 18, Ján Svorada in stages 9, 11, and 17, and Marco Pantani in stages 14 and 15. Jolly Componibili-Cage won two stages with Leoni. Gewiss–Ballan won multiple stages, with Moreno Argentin in stage 2 and three stages with Berzin. Team Polti–Vaporetto won two stages, with Gianni Bugno in stage 3 and Djamolidine Abdoujaparov in stage 10. GB–MG Maglificio won three stages, with Marco Saligari in stage 6, Maximilian Sciandri in stage 16, and Pascal Richard in stage 21. Lampre–Panaria won three stages with Ján Svorada. ZG Mobili–Selle Italia won two stages, with Andrea Ferrigato in stage 12 and Massimo Ghirotto in stage 19. Carrera Jeans–Tassoni also won multiple stages, with Marco Pantani in winning two stages and Vladimir Poulnikov in stage 20.

Castorama, Kelme–Avianca–Gios, Mercatone Uno–Medeghini, and Navigare–Blue Storm each won one stage apiece. Castorama rider Armand de Las Cuevas won stage 1b individual time trial, Kelme-Avianca-Gios's Laudelino Cubino won stage 7, Mercatone Uno-Medeghini rider Michele Bartoli won stage 13, and Navigare-Blue Storm's Stefano Zanini stage 22 by means of a sprint finish.

=== Doping ===
Despite not testing positive during the race or season, the Gewiss–Ballan team has since been speculated to have executed a systematic doping program that utilized EPO throughout the 1994 season. The team achieved several victories in stage races and one-day races during the year, including a sweep of the podium at La Flèche Wallonne weeks before the start of the Giro. Team doctor Michele Ferrari was banned for life from sports in 2012 by United States Anti-Doping Agency for distribution of performance-enhancing drugs to several of his clients.

== Classification leadership ==
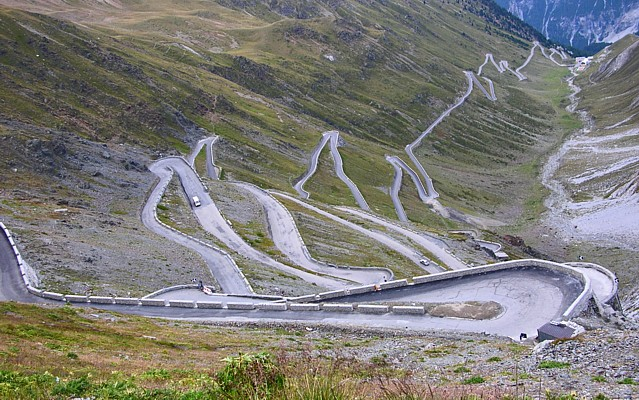
A sample of the 48 hairpin turns near the top of the eastern ramp of the Stelvio Pass, the Cima Coppi (highest elevation point) of the 1994 Giro.

Five different jerseys were worn during the 1994 Giro d'Italia. The leader of the general classification – calculated by adding the stage finish times of each rider, and allowing time bonuses for the first three finishers on mass-start stages – wore a pink jersey. The time bonuses for the 1994 Giro were twelve seconds for first, eight for second, and four seconds for third. This classification is the most important of the race, and its winner is considered as the winner of the Giro.

For the points classification, which awarded a purple (or cyclamen) jersey to its leader, cyclists were given points for finishing a stage in the top 15; additional points could also be won in intermediate sprints. The green jersey was awarded to the mountains classification leader. In this ranking, points were won by reaching the summit of a climb ahead of other cyclists. Each climb was ranked as either first, second or third category, with more points available for higher category climbs. The Cima Coppi, the race's highest point of elevation, awarded more points than the other first category climbs. The Cima Coppi for this Giro was the Stelvio Pass. The first rider to cross the Stelvio was Italian Franco Vona. The white jersey was worn by the leader of young rider classification, a ranking decided the same way as the general classification, but only riders born after 1 January 1970 were eligible for it. The intergiro classification was marked by a blue jersey. The calculation for the intergiro is similar to that of the general classification, in each stage there is a midway point that the riders pass through a point and where their time is stopped. As the race goes on, their times compiled and the person with the lowest time is the leader of the intergiro classification and wears the blue jersey. The first three riders to cross the intergiro line in each stage would receive a six, four, and two second time bonus, respectively. Although no jersey was awarded, there was also one classification for the teams, in which the stage finish times of the best three cyclists per team were added; the leading team was the one with the lowest total time.

The rows in the following table correspond to the jerseys awarded after that stage was run.

Classification leadership by stage
Stage	Winner	General classification	Points classification	Mountains classification	Young rider classification	Team classification
1a	Endrio Leoni	Endrio Leoni	Endrio Leoni	not awarded	Michele Bartoli	Jolly Componibili-Cage
1b	Armand de Las Cuevas	Armand de Las Cuevas	Armand de Las Cuevas	not awarded	Evgeni Berzin	Mercatone Uno–Medeghini
2	Moreno Argentin	Moreno Argentin	Evgeni Berzin	Michele Coppolillo	Evgeni Berzin	Gewiss–Ballan
3	Gianni Bugno	Moreno Argentin	Evgeni Berzin	Michele Coppolillo	Evgeni Berzin	Gewiss–Ballan
4	Evgeni Berzin	Evgeni Berzin	Evgeni Berzin	Michele Coppolillo	Evgeni Berzin	Team Polti–Vaporetto
5	Endrio Leoni	Evgeni Berzin	Evgeni Berzin	Michele Coppolillo	Evgeni Berzin	Team Polti–Vaporetto
6	Marco Saligari	Evgeni Berzin	Evgeni Berzin	Michele Coppolillo	Evgeni Berzin	Team Polti–Vaporetto
7	Laudelino Cubino	Evgeni Berzin	Evgeni Berzin	Michele Coppolillo	Evgeni Berzin	Team Polti–Vaporetto
8	Evgeni Berzin	Evgeni Berzin	Evgeni Berzin	Michele Coppolillo	Evgeni Berzin	Gewiss–Ballan
9	Ján Svorada	Evgeni Berzin	Evgeni Berzin	Michele Coppolillo	Evgeni Berzin	Gewiss–Ballan
10	Djamolidine Abdoujaparov	Evgeni Berzin	Evgeni Berzin	Michele Coppolillo	Evgeni Berzin	Gewiss–Ballan
11	Ján Svorada	Evgeni Berzin	Evgeni Berzin	Michele Coppolillo	Evgeni Berzin	Gewiss–Ballan
12	Andrea Ferrigato	Evgeni Berzin	Evgeni Berzin	Michele Coppolillo	Evgeni Berzin	Gewiss–Ballan
13	Michele Bartoli	Evgeni Berzin	Evgeni Berzin	Michele Coppolillo	Evgeni Berzin	Castorama
14	Marco Pantani	Evgeni Berzin	Evgeni Berzin	Pascal Richard	Evgeni Berzin	GB–MG Maglificio
15	Marco Pantani	Evgeni Berzin	Evgeni Berzin	Pascal Richard	Evgeni Berzin	Carrera Jeans–Vagabond
16	Maximilian Sciandri	Evgeni Berzin	Djamolidine Abdoujaparov	Pascal Richard	Evgeni Berzin	Carrera Jeans–Vagabond
17	Ján Svorada	Evgeni Berzin	Djamolidine Abdoujaparov	Pascal Richard	Evgeni Berzin	Carrera Jeans–Vagabond
18	Evgeni Berzin	Evgeni Berzin	Evgeni Berzin	Pascal Richard	Evgeni Berzin	Carrera Jeans–Vagabond
19	Massimo Ghirotto	Evgeni Berzin	Evgeni Berzin	Pascal Richard	Evgeni Berzin	Carrera Jeans–Vagabond
20	Vladimir Poulnikov	Evgeni Berzin	Evgeni Berzin	Pascal Richard	Evgeni Berzin	Carrera Jeans–Vagabond
21	Pascal Richard	Evgeni Berzin	Evgeni Berzin	Pascal Richard	Evgeni Berzin	Carrera Jeans–Vagabond
22	Stefano Zanini	Evgeni Berzin	Djamolidine Abdoujaparov	Pascal Richard	Evgeni Berzin	Carrera Jeans–Vagabond
Final		Evgeni Berzin	Djamolidine Abdoujaparov	Pascal Richard	Evgeni Berzin	Carrera Jeans–Tassoni

== Final standings ==
Legend
A pink jersey	Denotes the winner of the General classification	A green jersey	Denotes the winner of the Mountains classification
A purple jersey	Denotes the winner of the Points classification	A white jersey	Denotes the winner of the Young rider classification
A blue jersey	Denotes the winner of the Intergiro classification		

=== General classification ===
Final general classification (1–10)
	Rider	Team	Time
1	Evgeni Berzin (RUS)	Gewiss–Ballan	100h 41' 21"
2	Marco Pantani (ITA)	Carrera Jeans–Tassoni	+ 2' 51"
3	Miguel Induráin (ESP)	Banesto	+ 3' 23"
4	Pavel Tonkov (RUS)	Lampre–Panaria	+ 11' 16"
5	Claudio Chiappucci (ITA)	Carrera Jeans–Tassoni	+ 11' 52"
6	Nelson Rodríguez (COL)	ZG Mobili–Selle Italia	+ 13' 17"
7	Massimo Podenzana (ITA)	Navigare–Blue Storm	+ 14' 35"
8	Gianni Bugno (ITA)	Team Polti–Vaporetto	+ 15' 26"
9	Armand de Las Cuevas (FRA)	Castorama	+ 15' 35"
10	Andrew Hampsten (USA)	Motorola	+ 17' 21"

=== Points classification ===
Final points classification (1–10)
	Rider	Team	Points
1	Djamolidine Abdoujaparov (UZB)	Team Polti–Vaporetto	202
2	Evgeni Berzin (RUS)	Gewiss–Ballan	182
3	Gianni Bugno (ITA)	Team Polti–Vaporetto	148
4	Miguel Induráin (ESP)	Banesto	132
5	Stefano Zanini (ITA)	Navigare–Blue Storm	132
6	Marco Pantani (ITA)	Carrera Jeans–Tassoni	114
7	Fabiano Fontanelli (ITA)	ZG Mobili–Selle Italia	113
8	Armand de Las Cuevas (FRA)	Castorama	110
9	Giovanni Lombardi (ITA)	Lampre–Panaria	107
10	Claudio Chiappucci (ITA)	Carrera Jeans–Tassoni	102

=== Mountains classification ===
Final general classification (1–5)
	Rider	Team	Points
1	Pascal Richard (SUI)	GB–MG Maglificio	78
2	Michele Coppolillo (ITA)	Navigare–Blue Storm	58
3	Marco Pantani (ITA)	Carrera Jeans–Tassoni	44
4	Nelson Rodríguez (COL)	ZG Mobili–Selle Italia	24
5	Evgeni Berzin (RUS)	Gewiss–Ballan	20

=== Young rider classification ===
Final young rider classification (1–10)
	Rider	Team	Time
1	Evgeni Berzin (RUS)	Gewiss–Ballan	100h 41' 21"
2	Marco Pantani (ITA)	Carrera Jeans–Tassoni	+ 2' 51"
3	Wladimir Belli (ITA)	Lampre–Panaria	+ 19' 36"
4	Georg Totschnig (AUT)	Team Polti–Vaporetto	+ 20' 04"
5	Davide Rebellin (ITA)	GB–MG Maglificio	+ 34' 46"
6	Francesco Casagrande (ITA)	Mercatone Uno–Medeghini	+ 45' 32"
7	Giuseppe Guerini (ITA)	Navigare–Blue Storm	+ 1h 11' 27"
8	Michele Bartoli (ITA)	Mercatone Uno–Medeghini	+ 1h 33' 11"
9	José Luis Arrieta (ESP)	Banesto	+ 2h 00' 41"
10	Paolo Fornaciari (ITA)	Mercatone Uno–Medeghini	+ 2h 19' 35"

=== Intergiro classification ===
Final intergiro classification (1–3)
	Rider	Team	Time
1	Djamolidine Abdoujaparov (UZB)	Team Polti–Vaporetto	62h 00' 39"
2	Evgeni Berzin (RUS)	Gewiss–Ballan	+ 44"
3	Fabiano Fontanelli (ITA)	ZG Mobili–Selle Italia	+ 1' 50"

=== Team classification ===
Final team classification (1–10)
	Team	Time
1	Carrera Jeans–Tassoni	302h 25' 45"
2	Team Polti–Vaporetto	+ 24' 55"
3	Lampre–Panaria	+ 24' 56"
4	Gewiss–Ballan	+ 36' 21"
5	GB–MG Maglificio	+ 41' 23"
6	Castorama	+ 1h 29' 22"
7	Kelme–Avianca–Gios	+ 1h 40' 39"
8	Banesto	+ 1h 51' 13"
9	Navigare–Blue Storm	+ 1h 52' 46"
10	ZG Mobili–Selle Italia	+ 2h 02' 57"

=== Team points classification ===
Final team points classification (1–10)
	Team	Points
1	Team Polti–Vaporetto	543
2	GB–MG Maglificio	504
3	Lampre–Panaria	446
4	Carrera Jeans–Tassoni	388
5	Navigare–Blue Storm	375
6	ZG Mobili–Selle Italia	363
7	Gewiss–Ballan	358
8	Mercatone Uno–Medeghini	321
9	Castorama	242
10	Brescialat-Ceramiche Refin	223
