= List of wins by Team Deutsche Telekom and its successors =

This is a list of victories by the cycling team HTC–Highroad, former known as Team Deutsche Telekom, T-Mobile Team, Team High Road, Team Columbia, Team Columbia-HTC, Team HTC-Columbia.

== 1989 – Team Stuttgart ==
Stage 2 Herald Sun Tour, Udo Bölts
Germany National Road race, Dariusz Kajzer

== 1990 – Team Stuttgart ==
Polder-Kempen, Ad Wijnands
Driedaagse van De Panne-Koksijde, Erwin Nijboer
Vuelta a España

Stage 4, Erwin Nijboer
Stage 14, Bernd Gröne

Germany National Road race, Udo Bölts
Stage 4 Tour of Ireland, Markus Schleicher
Overall Herald Sun Tour, Udo Bölts

Stage 8a, Hartmut Bölts

== 1991 – Team Telekom ==
Overall Étoile de Bessèges, Ad Wijnands
Itzulia Basque Country

Points classification, Ad Wijnands
Stage 1, Ad Wijnands

Prologue Tour of Sweden, Dean Woods
Stage 7 Tour of Sweden, Carsten Wolf
Circuit Escaut-Durme, Markus Schleicher
Stage 4 Ronde van Nederland, Gerard Veldscholten
Stage 2 Australian Alpine Classic, Hartmut Bölts

== 1992 – Team Telekom ==
Stage 3 Itzulia Basque Country, Udo Bölts
Overall Trophée des Grimpeurs, Marc Madiot
GP Kanton Aargau, Uwe Ampler
Stage 5 4 Jours de Dunkerque, Marc Madiot
Stage 19 Giro d'Italia, Udo Bölts
Omloop Schelde-Durme, Markus Schleicher
Schaal Sels, Wilfried Peeters

== 1993 – Team Telekom ==
Stage 6 La Méditerranéenne, Olaf Ludwig
Stage 1 Tirreno–Adriatico, Erik Zabel
Stage 6 Tirreno–Adriatico, Uwe Raab
Stage 5 Setmana Catalana de Ciclisme, Steffen Wesemann
Stage 2 Vuelta a Aragón, Olaf Ludwig
Tour de Berne, Erik Zabel
Stage 5 Four Days of Dunkirk, Olaf Ludwig
Stage 4 Tour de Romandie, Rolf Aldag
Stage 4 Dekra Open Stuttgart, Olaf Ludwig
Stage 13 Tour de France, Olaf Ludwig
Versatel Classic, Olaf Ludwig
Points classification Vuelta a Burgos, Erik Zabel
Stage 11 Tour de l'Avenir, Steffen Wesemann
Germany National Road race, Bernd Gröne

== 1994 – Team Telekom ==
Germany National Road race, Jens Heppner
Stage 10 Ruta Mexico, Jürgen Werner
Classic Haribo, Erik Zabel
Points classification Vuelta a Aragón, Erik Zabel

Stages 2, 3 & 5, Erik Zabel
Stage 7, Olaf Ludwig

Eschborn–Frankfurt, Olaf Ludwig
Stage 4 Four Days of Dunkirk, Olaf Ludwig
Rund um Köln, Udo Bölts
Overall Dekra Open Stutgart, Rolf Aldag

Stage 2, Rolf Aldag

Omloop van de Westkust, Udo Bölts
Stage 5 Tour of Britain, Olaf Ludwig
Stage 4 Regio-Tour, Michael Rich
Overall Tour du Limousin, Jens Heppner

Stage 1, Jens Heppner

Stages 2, 5, 7 & 8 Tour de l'Avenir, Erik Zabel
LuK Challenge Chrono, Jens Lehmann
Paris–Tours, Erik Zabel
Overall Herald Sun Tour, Christian Henn

Stage 7, Christian Henn
Stages 8 & 9, Udo Bölts

== 1995 – Team Telekom ==
Stage 1 Tirreno–Adriatico, Erik Zabel
Stage 2 Vuelta a Aragón, Erik Zabel
Veenendaal–Veenendaal Classic, Olaf Ludwig
Stages 1 & 7 Four Days of Dunkirk, Erik Zabel
Stages 3 & 4 Tour de Suisse, Erik Zabel
Germany National Road race, Udo Bölts
Stages 6 & 17, Tour de France, Erik Zabel
Stage 2 Tour du Limousin, Jens Heppner
Stage 3 Tour du Limousin, Rolf Aldag
Stage 12 Vuelta a España, Bert Dietz
Stage 13 Vuelta a España, Christian Henn

== 1996 – Team Telekom ==
Points classification Vuelta a Andalucía, Erik Zabel

Stage 2, Olaf Ludwig
Stage 4, Erik Zabel

Stages 1, 2 & 4 Setmana Catalana de Ciclisme, Erik Zabel
Stage 1 Driedaagse De Panne, Olaf Ludwig
GP Herning, Bjarne Riis
Hannover–Berlin, Erik Zabel
Stage 1 4 Jours de Dunkerque, Olaf Ludwig
Stage 2 4 Jours de Dunkerque, Erik Zabel
Overall Course de la Paix, Steffen Wesemann

Stages 1, 2, 4, 6, 9, 10 & 11, Steffen Wesemann
Stage 3, Michael Andersson

Rund um die Hainleite, Mario Kummer
Rund um Köln, Erik Zabel
Stage 2 Tour of Luxembourg, Erik Zabel
Stage 2 Tour of Sweden, Christian Henn
Stage 3 Tour of Sweden, Michael Andersson
Stage 4 Tour of Sweden, Bert Dietz
Stage 7 Tour of Sweden, Mikael Holst Kyneb
Stage 7 Tour de Suisse, Udo Bölts
Denmark National Road race, Bjarne Riis
Germany National Road race, Christian Henn
Overall Tour de France, Bjarne Riis

Points classification, Erik Zabel
Youth classification, Jan Ullrich
Stages 3 & 10, Erik Zabel
Stages 9 & 16, Bjarne Riis
Stage 20, Jan Ullrich

Overall Rheinland-Pfalz Rundfahrt, Olaf Ludwig

Stage 3, Steffen Wesemann
Stages 4 & 10, Olaf Ludwig

Versatel Classic, Erik Zabel
Stage 5 Vuelta a Castilla y León, Udo Bölts
Clásica de San Sebastián, Udo Bölts
Overall Regio-Tour, Jan Ullrich

Stage 1, Jens Heppner
Stage 3, Jan Ullrich

Stage 3 Tour du Limousin, Rolf Aldag
Stage 5 Ronde van Nederland, Erik Zabel
Stage 6 Ronde van Nederland, Olaf Ludwig
Coppa Sabatini, Bjarne Riis
Overall Tour of China, Michael Andersson

Stage 3, Michael Andersson

== 1997 – Team Telekom ==
Germany National Road race, Jan Ullrich
Sweden National Road race, Michel Lafis
Trofeo Palma, Erik Zabel
Overall Vuelta a Andalucía, Erik Zabel

Points classification, Erik Zabel
Stage 1, Erik Zabel

Trofeo Luis Puig, Erik Zabel
Points classification Volta a la Comunitat Valenciana, Erik Zabel
Stage 3, Erik Zabel
Stage 4 Tirreno–Adriatico, Giovanni Lombardi
Milan–San Remo, Erik Zabel
Rund um den Kreis Unna, Erik Zabel
Points classification Vuelta a Aragón, Erik Zabel

Mountains classification, Jan Ullrich
Stage 1, Bert Dietz

Scheldeprijs, Erik Zabel
Amstel Gold Race, Bjarne Riis
Continentale Classic, Erik Zabel
GP Kanton Aargau, Udo Bölts
Colmar–Strasbourg, Udo Bölts
GP Aarhus, Bjarne Riis
Overall Course de la Paix, Steffen Wesemann

Points classification, Steffen Wesemann
Mountains classification, Christian Henn
Stages 2, 3 & 7, Steffen Wesemann
Stage 6, Christian Henn

GP Herning, Bjarne Riis
Stage 1 Euskal Bizikleta, Giovanni Lombardi
Stage 6 Euskal Bizikleta, Udo Bölts
Overall Bayern Rundfahrt, Christian Henn

Stages 2 & 5, Erik Zabel
Stage 3, Christian Henn

Stage 1 Tour of Luxembourg, Erik Zabel
Overall Critérium du Dauphiné, Udo Bölts

Mountain classification, Udo Bölts
Stage 5, Jens Heppner

Stage 2 Tour de Suisse, Erik Zabel
Stage 4 Tour de Suisse, Jan Ullrich
Stage 8 Tour de Suisse, Rolf Aldag
Flèche Ardennaise, Christian Henn
Ostbelgien Rundfahrt, Christian Henn
Overall Tour de France, Jan Ullrich

Points classification, Erik Zabel
Youth classification, Jan Ullrich
Stages 3, 7 & 8, Erik Zabel
Stages 10 & 12, Jan Ullrich

Stage 4 Vuelta a Castilla y León, Georg Totschnig
Points classification Danmark Rundt, Giovanni Lombardi

Stages 2 & 6, Giovanni Lombardi

Stage 3 Danmark Rundt, Christian Henn
Cyclassics Hamburg, Jan Ullrich
Stage 5 Regio-Tour, Kai Hundertmarck
Stage 5 Ronde van Nederland, Erik Zabel
Stage 6 Ronde van Nederland, Giovanni Lombardi
Rund um Berlin, Erik Zabel
Overall Hessen Rundfahrt, Christian Henn

Stages 2 & 5, Kai Hundertmarck

Stage 3 GP Wilhelm Tell, Rolf Aldag
Stage 4 GP Wilhelm Tell, Bjarne Riis

== 1998 – Team Telekom ==
Trofeo Palma, Erik Zabel
Stage 1 Volta a la Comunitat Valenciana, Erik Zabel
Tirreno–Adriatico

Points classification, Erik Zabel
Stages 2, 7 & 8, Erik Zabel
Stage 6, Giovanni Lombardi

Milan–San Remo, Erik Zabel
Prologue Tour de Normandie, Andreas Klöden
Overall Niedersachsen Rundfahrt, Andreas Klöden

Stage 3, Andreas Klöden

Stage 7 Course de la Paix, Bert Dietz
GP de Wallonie, Udo Bölts
Delta Profonde, Erik Zabel
GP Herning, Bjarne Riis
Bayern Rundfahrt

Prologue and Stage 2, Dirk Müller
Stages 1 & 4, Erik Zabel

Sparkassen Giro Bochum, Jan Ullrich
Stage 6 Euskal Bizikleta, Bjarne Riis
Stage 4 Vuelta a Castilla y León, Steffen Wesemann
Stage 4 Tour of Luxembourg, Erik Zabel
Stage 5 Route d'Occitanie, Erik Zabel
Germany National Road race, Erik Zabel
Tour de France

Points classification, Erik Zabel
Youth classification, Jan Ullrich
Stage 3, Jens Heppner
Stages 7, 16 & 20, Jan Ullrich

Prologue Sachsen Tour, Steffen Wesemann
Stage 7 Sachsen Tour, Dirk Müller
Rund um Berlin, Jan Ullrich
Rund um die Nürnberger Altstadt, Jan Ullrich
Stage 7 Vuelta a España, Giovanni Lombardi

== 1999 – Team Telekom ==
Stages 2 & 4, Tour Down Under, Erik Zabel
Points classification Volta a la Comunitat Valenciana, Erik Zabel

Stage 2, Erik Zabel

Stage 3 Volta ao Algarve, Andreas Klöden
Stage 1 Vuelta a Aragón, Erik Zabel
Stage 3 Ster ZLM Toer, Ralf Grabsch
Eschborn–Frankfurt, Erik Zabel
Overall Course de la Paix, Steffen Wesemann

Stages 1, 4 & 5, Danilo Hondo
Stages 2, 7 & 10, Steffen Wesemann

Rund um Köln, Jens Heppner
Overall Deutschland Tour, Jens Heppner

Points classification, Erik Zabel
Mountain classification, Jens Heppner
Stage 2, Rolf Aldag
Stage 6, Erik Zabel

Overall Bayern Rundfahrt, Rolf Aldag

Stages 2 & 5, Erik Zabel

Stage 4 Euskal Bizikleta, Giovanni Lombardi
Sparkassen Giro, Erik Zabel
Stage 3 Tour of Austria, Giovanni Lombardi
Stages 4 & 5, Volta a Catalunya, Erik Zabel
Germany National Road race, Udo Bölts
Tour de France

Points classification, Erik Zabel
Stage 10, Giuseppe Guerini

Vuelta a Castilla y León

Points classification, Alberto Elli
Mountain classification, Alberto Elli

Stage 1 Regio-Tour, Danilo Hondo
Stage 5 Regio-Tour, Giovanni Lombardi
Overall Vuelta a España, Jan Ullrich

Stages 6 & 20, Jan Ullrich

== 2000 – Team Telekom ==
Stage 4 Tour Down Under, Steffen Wesemann
Stage 5 Tour Down Under, Erik Zabel
Stage 1 Rapport Tour, Alberto Elli
Stage 1 Vuelta a Andalucía, Erik Zabel
Trofeo Luis Puig, Erik Zabel
Points classification Vuelta Ciclista a Murcia, Alberto Elli
Stage 4 Comunitat Valenciana, Erik Zabel
Stage 4 Tirreno–Adriatico, Erik Zabel
Overall Paris–Nice, Andreas Klöden

Stage 7, Andreas Klöden

Milan–San Remo, Erik Zabel
Points classification Setmana Catalana de Ciclisme, Erik Zabel

Stages 3 & 4, Erik Zabel

Overall Itzulia Basque Country, Andreas Klöden

Stage 6, Andreas Klöden

Stage 6 Vuelta a Aragón, Giovanni Lombardi
Amstel Gold Race, Erik Zabel
Rund um Köln, Steffen Wesemann
GP Kanton Aargau, Steffen Wesemann
Eschborn–Frankfurt, Kai Hundertmarck
Course de la Paix

Stages 1 & 4, Steffen Wesemann
Stages 3 & 5, Danilo Hondo
Stage 7, Andreas Klöden

Stage 3 Bayern Rundfahrt, Erik Zabel
Stage 1 Euskal Bizikleta, Giovanni Lombardi
Points classification Deutschland Tour, Erik Zabel

Stage 1, Jens Heppner
Stages 2, 5 & 8, Erik Zabel
Stage 3, Udo Bölts

GP de Wallonie, Alberto Elli
Overall Österreich-Rundfahrt, Georg Totschnig

Stages 1 & 8, Giovanni Lombardi
Stage 5, Georg Totschnig

Overall`Tour de Luxembourg, Alberto Elli
Stage 1 TTT, Tour de Suisse
Stage 2 Tour of Sweden, Danilo Hondo
Volta Catalunya

Stages 2 & 3, Erik Zabel
Stages 5 & 6, Giovanni Lombardi

Germany National Road race, Rolf Aldag
Tour de France

Points classification, Erik Zabel
Stage 20, Erik Zabel

Stage 4 Vuelta a Burgos, Giovanni Lombardi
Coppa Ugo Agostoni, Jan Ullrich
Stage 18 Vuelta a España, Alexandre Vinokourov
Stage 3 Rheinland-Pfalz Rundfahrt, Erik Zabel

== 2001 – Team Telekom ==
Stage 5 Tour Down Under, Kai Hundertmarck
Trofeo Palma, Erik Zabel
Trofeo Cala Millor, Erik Zabel
Stage 3 Vuelta a Andalucía, Erik Zabel
Trofeo Luis Puig, Erik Zabel
Stage 2 Comunitat Valenciana, Erik Zabel
Points classification Paris–Nice, Erik Zabel
Milano–San Remo, Erik Zabel
Stage 1 Driedaagse De Panne, Danilo Hondo
Rund um Köln, Gian Matteo Fagnini
Berner Rundfahrt, Danilo Hondo
Eschborn–Frankfurt (U23), David Kopp
Stages 2 & 3 Giro d'Italia, Danilo Hondo
Stages 3, 4, 5 & 6 Bayern Rundfahrt, Erik Zabel
Overall Deutschland Tour, Alexandre Vinokourov

Stages 2, 3 & 8, Erik Zabel
Stage 6, Alexandre Vinokourov
Stage 7, Rolf Aldag

Tour de Suisse

Points classification, Erik Zabel
Stages 1 & 8, Erik Zabel
Stage 3, Alexandre Vinokourov

Germany National Road race, Jan Ullrich
Tour de France

Points classification, Erik Zabel
Stages 1, 3 & 19, Erik Zabel

Versatel Classic, Jan Ullrich
Stage 1 Danmark Rundt, Danilo Hondo
Cyclassics Hamburg, Erik Zabel
Stage 5 Ronde van Nederland, Danilo Hondo
Stage 1 Hessen Rundfahrt, Jan Ullrich
Stages 2, 3 & 4 Vuelta a España, Erik Zabel
Giro dell'Emilia, Jan Ullrich
Stage 3 Giro Provincia Lucca, Jan Ullrich

== 2002 – Team Telekom ==
Overall Paris–Nice, Alexandre Vinokourov

Stage 4, Alexandre Vinokourov

Stage 1 Tirreno–Adriatico, Erik Zabel
Setmana Catalana de Ciclisme

Stages 1 & 2, Erik Zabel
Stage 4, Giuseppe Guerini

Stage 2 Vuelta a Aragón, Erik Zabel
Stage 6 Niedersachsen Rundfahrt, Robert Bartko
Eschborn–Frankfurt, Erik Zabel
Bayern Rundfahrt

Stage 1, Rolf Aldag
Stage 6, Erik Zabel

Stage 1 Tour de Luxembourg, Erik Zabel
Stages 1, 2, 5 & 7 Deutschland Tour, Erik Zabel
Stage 2 Volta a Catalunya, Danilo Hondo
Tour de Suisse

Points classification, Erik Zabel
Stages 2 & 8, Erik Zabel
Stage 3, Alexandre Vinokourov

Germany National Road race, Danilo Hondo
Stage 6 Tour de France, Erik Zabel
Versatel Classic, Erik Zabel
Stage 1 Ronde van Nederland, Erik Zabel
Grote Prijs Jef Scherens, Andreas Klier
Nürnberger Altstadt, Erik Zabel
Hessen Rundfahrt
Stage 3, Danilo Hondo
Stage 6, Stephan Schreck
Stage 2 Rheinland-Pfalz Rundfahrt, Danilo Hondo
Vuelta a España

Points classification, Erik Zabel

== 2003 – Team Telekom ==
Stage 3 Vuelta a Murcia, Erik Zabel
Overall Paris–Nice, Alexandre Vinokourov

Stage 5, Alexandre Vinokourov

Stages 1 & 5 Setmana Catalana de Ciclisme, Erik Zabel
GP Miguel Induráin, Matthias Kessler
Gent–Wevelgem, Andreas Klier
Amstel Gold Race, Alexandre Vinokourov
Rund Flughafen Köln/Bonn, Steffen Wesemann
Overall Course de la Paix, Steffen Wesemann

Stages 1 & 2, Danilo Hondo
Stage 3, Steffen Wesemann

Stage 4 Bayern Rundfahrt, Erik Zabel
Stage 1 Deutschland Tour, Erik Zabel
Overall Tour de Suisse, Alexandre Vinokourov

Stage 1, Alexandre Vinokourov
Stage 7, Sergei Yakovlev

Germany National Road race, Erik Zabel
Stage 9 Tour de France
Stage 6 Sachsen Tour, Steffen Wesemann
Versatel Classic, Erik Zabel
Sparkassen Giro, Rolf Aldag
Championship of Zurich, Daniele Nardello
Stage 3 Ronde van Nederland, Erik Zabel
GP Triberg-Schwarzwald, Torsten Hiekmann
Nürnberger Altstadt, Kai Hundertmarck
Hessen Rundfahrt

Stage 3, Kai Hundertmarck
Stage 5, Daniele Nardello

Stages 10 & 11 Vuelta a España, Erik Zabel
Overall Rheinland-Pfalz Rundfahrt, Daniele Nardello

Stage 2, Daniele Nardello

LUK Cup Bühl, Matthias Kessler
Paris–Tours, Erik Zabel

== 2004 – T-Mobile Team ==
Vuelta Independencia, Maxim Iglinskiy
Stage 5 Vuelta a Andalucía, Erik Zabel
Stages 5, 7 & 8 Paris–Nice, Alexandre Vinokourov
GP Miguel Induráin, Matthias Kessler
Ronde van Vlaanderen, Steffen Wesemann
Rund um Köln, Erik Zabel
Prologue Tour of Hellas, Maxim Iglinskiy
Stage 1 GP Sunny Beach, Maxim Iglinskiy
Stages 7 & 9 Course de la Paix, Erik Zabel
Stages 2 & 5 Bayern Rundfahrt, Erik Zabel
Overall Österreich-Rundfahrt, Cadel Evans

Stage 2, Cadel Evans

Overall Tour de Suisse, Jan Ullrich

Stages 1 & 9, Jan Ullrich

Stage 1 Mainfranken-Tour, Heinrich Haussler
Germany National Road race, Andreas Klöden
Stage 1 Sachsen Tour, Stephan Schreck
Overall Regio-Tour, Alexandre Vinokourov

Stage 1, Stephan Schreck
Stages 2 & 3, Alexandre Vinokourov

Stage 3 Rheinland-Pfalz Rundfahrt, Rolf Aldag
Coppa Sabatini, Jan Ullrich

== 2005 – T-Mobile Team ==
Liège–Bastogne–Liège, Alexandre Vinokourov
Eschborn–Frankfurt, Erik Zabel
Stage 5 Bayern Rundfahrt, Andreas Klöden
Tour de Luxembourg

Stage 1, Eric Baumann
Stage 5, Bram Schmitz

Stage 4 Critérium du Dauphiné, Alexandre Vinokourov
Stage 2 Tour de Suisse, Jan Ullrich
Germany National U23 Time trial, Paul Martens
Kazakhstan National Road race, Alexandre Vinokourov
Russia National Road race, Sergei Ivanov
Tour de France

Stages 11 & 21, Alexandre Vinokourov
Stage 19, Giuseppe Guerini

Stage 8 Deutschland Tour, Jan Ullrich
Stage 4 Tour of Britain, Sergei Ivanov
Omloop Leiedal, Alexandre Vinokourov
Paris–Tours, Erik Zabel

== 2006 – T-Mobile Team ==
Stages 6 & 7 Tour of California, Olaf Pollack
Stages 1 & 4 Rheinland-Pfalz Rundfahrt, André Greipel
Stage 5 Int.Thürin-Rundf, Mark Cavendish
Stage 11 Giro d'Italia, Jan Ullrich
Prologue Tour de Luxembourg, Kim Kirchen
Stages 4 & 5 Tour de Berlin, Mark Cavendish
Overall Vuelta a Asturias, Óscar Sevilla

Stage 2, Óscar Sevilla

Overall Tour de Suisse, Jan Ullrich

Stage 9 Jan Ullrich

Austria National Road race, Bernhard Kohl
Luxembourg National Road race, Kim Kirchen
Stage 3 Solidarnosc Champions, Mark Cavendish
Tour de France

Stage 3, Matthias Kessler
Stages 7 & 19, Serhiy Honchar

Stage 4 Danmark Rundt, Olaf Pollack
Overall Rothaus Regio Tour, Andreas Klöden

Stage 3, Michael Rogers
Stage 4, Andreas Klöden

Stage 1 Hessen Rundfahrt, Patrik Sinkewitz

== 2007 – T-Mobile Team/Team High Road ==
Stage 2 Volta ao Algarve, Bernhard Eisel
Stage 2 3 Jours de Normandie, Andrey Klyuev
Milano–Busseto, Ian Stannard
Stage 4 Tour de Normandie, Andrey Klyuev
Gent–Wevelgem, Marcus Burghardt
Scheldeprijs, Mark Cavendish
Rund um Düren, Marcel Beima
Stage 3 Niedersachsen Rundfahrt, Gerald Ciolek
Eschborn–Frankfurt, Patrik Sinkewitz
Stages 3 & 6 4 Jours de Dunkerque, Mark Cavendish
Rheinland-Pfalz Rundfahrt, Gerald Ciolek
Stages 2 & 6 Volta Catalunya, Mark Cavendish
Lancaster Classic, Bernhard Eisel
Reading Classic, Bernhard Eisel
Stage 4 Ster ZLM Toer, Mark Cavendish
Germany National Time trial, Bert Grabsch
Italy National Time trial, Marco Pinotti
Stages 2 & 8 Österreich-Rundfahrt, Gerald Ciolek
Tour de France

Stage 7, Linus Gerdemann
Stage 15, Kim Kirchen

Sachsen Tour

Stages 1 & 2, André Greipel
Stage 3, Eric Baumann
Stage 5, Stephan Schreck

Stage 6 Danmark Rundt, Mark Cavendish
Stages 6, 7 & 9 Deutschland Tour, Gerald Ciolek
Stage 2 BinckBank Tour, Mark Cavendish
Vuelta a España

Stage 8, Bert Grabsch
Stage 13, Andreas Klier

Prologue and Stage 1 Tour of Britain, Mark Cavendish
Hessen Rundfahrt

Stage 1, Gerald Ciolek
Stages 3 & 5, Marcus Burghardt

Stage 3 Tour l'Eurométropole, Mark Cavendish

== 2008 – Team High Road/Team Columbia ==
Australia National Time trial, Adam Hansen
Schwalbe Classic, André Greipel
Overall Tour Down Under, André Greipel

Stages 2, 4, 5 & 6, André Greipel

Stage 7 Tour of California, George Hincapie
Stage 5 Volta ao Algarve, Bernhard Eisel
Stage 3 Critérium International, Edvald Boasson Hagen
Stages 2 & 3 Driedaagse De Panne, Mark Cavendish
Volta Limburg Classic, Tony Martin
Stages 2 & 4 Itzulia Basque Country, Kim Kirchen
Scheldeprijs, Mark Cavendish
GP de Denain, Edvald Boasson Hagen
La Flèche Wallonne, Kim Kirchen
Overall Tour de Georgia, Kanstantsin Sivtsov

Stages 3 & 7, Greg Henderson
Stage 6, Kanstantsin Sivtsov

Prologue Tour de Romandie, Mark Cavendish
Stage 2 Giro della Regione Friuli, Andrea Piechele
Giro d'Italia

Stages 4 & 13, Mark Cavendish
Stage 17, André Greipel
Stage 21, Marco Pinotti

Stage 3 Ronde de l'Isard, Gert Dockx
Stages 1 & 3 Bayern Rundfahrt, Gerald Ciolek
Stage 2 Critérium du Dauphiné, George Hincapie
Ster ZLM Toer

Prologue, Tony Martin
Stage 4, Mark Cavendish

Stage 6 Tour de Suisse, Kim Kirchen
Italy National Time trial, Marco Pinotti
Czech Republic National Time trial, František Raboň
Luxembourg National Time trial, Kim Kirchen
Germany National Time trial, Bert Grabsch
Norway National Time trial, Edvald Boasson Hagen
GP Citta di Guastalla, Andrea Piechele
Tour de France

Stage 4, Kim Kirchen
Stages 5, 8, 2 & 13, Mark Cavendish
Stage 18, Marcus Burghardt

Österreich-Rundfahrt

Stage 4, André Greipel
Stage 6, Bert Grabsch

Overall Sachsen Tour, Bert Grabsch

Stages 1 & 3, André Greipel
Stage 4, Bert Grabsch

Gp Ciclistico di Arcade, Andrea Piechele
Overall Tour de l'Ain, Linus Gerdemann

Stage 3, Tony Martin
Stage 4, Linus Gerdemann

Coppa Ugo Agostoni, Linus Gerdemann
BinckBank Tour

Stage 2, André Greipel
Stage 6, Edvald Boasson Hagen

Overall Tour of Ireland, Marco Pinotti

Stages 1, 2 & 3, Mark Cavendish
Stage 5, František Raboň

Overall Deutschland Tour, Linus Gerdemann

Stage 1, Linus Gerdemann
Stage 4, André Greipel
Stage 5, Gerald Ciolek
Stage 8, Tony Martin

Astico Brenta, Andrea Piechele
Tour of Missouri

Stages 1, 2 & 6, Mark Cavendish
Stage 4, Michael Barry

Stages 4, 5 & 7 Tour of Britain, Edvald Boasson Hagen
Nürnberger Altstadt, André Greipel
Kamp. van Vlaanderen, André Greipel
Münsterland Giro, André Greipel
Gran Premio Calvatone, Andrea Piechele
Paris–Bourges, Bernhard Eisel

== 2009 – Team Columbia–High Road/Team Columbia–HTC ==
Australia National Time trial, Michael Rogers
Stage 1 Tour Down Under, André Greipel
Stages 4 & 6 Tour of Qatar, Mark Cavendish
Stages 4 & 5 Tour of California, Mark Cavendish
Clásica de Almería, Greg Henderson
Vuelta a Murcia

Stage 2, Greg Henderson
Stage 3, František Raboň

Strade Bianche, Thomas Löfkvist
Stage 7 Tirreno–Adriatico, Mark Cavendish
Milano-Sanremo, Mark Cavendish
Stage 3 Critérium International, Tony Martin
Stages 2 & 3 Driedaagse De Panne, Mark Cavendish
Gent–Wevelgem, Edvald Boasson Hagen
Itzulia Basque Country

Stage 4, Michael Albasini
Stage 5, Marco Pinotti

Tour de Romandie

Prologue, František Raboň
Stage 3 TTT

Giro d'Italia

Stage 1 TTT
Stage 7, Edvald Boasson Hagen
Stage 8, Kanstantsin Sivtsov
Stages 9, 11 & 13, Mark Cavendish

Stage 6 4 Jours de Dunkerque, André Greipel
Stage 6 Volta Catalunya, Greg Henderson
Bayern Rundfahrt

Stages 1, 3 & 5, André Greipel
Stage 4, Tony Martin

Neuseen Classics, André Greipel
Philly Cycling Classic, André Greipel
Stage 4 Critérium du Dauphiné, Bert Grabsch
Tour de Suisse

Stage 2, Bernhard Eisel
Stages 3 & 6, Mark Cavendish
Stage 5, Michael Albasini
Stage 7, Kim Kirchen
Stage 8, Tony Martin

Stages 1, 2 & 4 Ster ZLM Toer, André Greipel
Italy National Time trial, Marco Pinotti
Czech Republic National Time trial, František Raboň
Luxembourg National Time trial, Kim Kirchen
Norway National Time trial, Edvald Boasson Hagen
Germany National Time trial, Bert Grabsch
Tour de France

Stages 2, 3, 10, 11, 19 & 21, Mark Cavendish

Overall Österreich-Rundfahrt, Michael Albasini

Stages 1, 6 & 8, André Greipel
Stage 2, Michael Albasini

Sachsen Tour

Stage 1, André Greipel
Stage 5, Thomas Löfkvist

Sparkassen Giro, Mark Cavendish
Tour de Pologne

Stages 4 & 6, Edvald Boasson Hagen
Stage 7, André Greipel

Belgium National Time trial, Maxime Monfort
Stage 2 Tour of Ireland, Mark Cavendish
Overall BinckBank Tour, Edvald Boasson Hagen

Stages 6 & 7, Edvald Boasson Hagen

United States National Road race, George Hincapie
Vuelta a España

Stage 3 Greg Henderson
Stages 4, 5, 16 & 21, André Greipel

Stages 1 & 2 Tour of Missouri, Mark Cavendish
Overall Tour of Britain, Edvald Boasson Hagen

Stages 3, 4, 5 & 6, Edvald Boasson Hagen

Paris–Bourges, André Greipel

== 2010 – Team HTC–Columbia ==
Overall Tour Down Under, André Greipel

Stages 1, 2 & 4, André Greipel

Trofeo Calvià, André Greipel
Stage 4 Tour of Oman, Leigh Howard
Stage 2 Vuelta ao Algarve, André Greipel
Vuelta a Andalucía, Michael Rogers
Overall Vuelta a Murcia, František Raboň

Stage 4, František Raboň

Stage 1 Volta Catalunya, Mark Cavendish
Gent–Wevelgem, Bernhard Eisel
Stages 1, 2, 5, 6 & 8 Tour of Turkey, André Greipel
Tour de Romandie

Prologue, Marco Pinotti
Stage 2, Mark Cavendish

Overall Tour of California, Michael Rogers

Stage 1, Mark Cavendish
Stage 7, Tony Martin

Giro d'Italia

Stage 9, Matthew Goss
Stage 18, André Greipel

Overall Bayern Rundfahrt, Maxime Monfort

Stage 4, Maxime Monfort

Philly Cycling Classic, Matthew Goss
Overall Ster ZLM Toer, Adam Hansen

Stage 3, Adam Hansen

Stage 9 Tour de Suisse, Tony Martin
Czech Republic National Time trial, František Raboň
Slovakia National Time trial, Martin Velits
Germany National Time trial, Tony Martin
Italy National Time trial, Marco Pinotti
Latvia National Road race, Aleksejs Saramotins
Stages 1 & 6 Österreich-Rundfahrt, André Greipel
Tour de France

Stages 5, 6, 11, 18 & 20, Mark Cavendish

Stages 2 & 7 Tour de Pologne, André Greipel
Danmark Rundt

Stage 1, Matthew Goss
Stage 4, Mark Renshaw
Stage 6, Hayden Roulston

Overall BinckBank Tour, Tony Martin

Stages 2 & 6, André Greipel
Stage 7, Tony Martin

Bretagne Classic, Matthew Goss
Omloop Mandel, Jan Ghyselinck
Vuelta a España

Stage 1 TTT
Stages 12, 13 & 18, Mark Cavendish
Stage 17, Peter Velits

Overall Tour of Britain, Michael Albasini

Stages 1, 6 & 8, André Greipel
Stage 3, Michael Albasini

Kamp. van Vlaanderen, Leigh Howard
GP d'Isbergues, Aleksejs Saramotins
Overall Tour of Southland, Hayden Roulston

Stages 1, 7 & 8, Hayden Roulston

== 2011 – HTC–Highroad ==
Overall Bay Cycling Classic, Matthew Goss

Stages 1 & 4, Matthew Goss

New Zealand National Road race, Hayden Roulston
Schwalbe Classic, Matthew Goss
Stage 1 Tour Down Under, Matthew Goss
Overall Tour of Qatar, Mark Renshaw

Stage 4, Mark Renshaw

Stage 2 Tour of Oman, Matthew Goss
Stage 6 Tour of Oman, Mark Cavendish
Overall Volta ao Algarve, Tony Martin

Stage 2, John Degenkolb
Stage 5, Tony Martin

Stage 1 Dwars door West-Vlaanderen, John Degenkolb
Overall Paris–Nice, Tony Martin

Stage 3, Matthew Goss
Stage 6, Tony Martin

2011 Milan–San Remo, Matthew Goss
Stage 1 Volta Catalunya, Aleksejs Saramotins
Scheldeprijs, Mark Cavendish
Stage 6 Itzulia Basque Country, Tony Martin
Rutland – Melton Classic, Zakkari Dempster
Girvan 3-day, Zakkari Dempster
Eschborn–Frankfurt, John Degenkolb
Giro d'Italia

Stage 1 TTT
Stages 10 & 12, Mark Cavendish

Stage 8 Tour of California, Matthew Goss
Bayern Rundfahrt

Stage 2, John Degenkolb
Stage 3, Michael Albasini

GP Kanton Aargau, Michael Albasini
Philly Cycling Classic, Alex Rasmussen
Critérium du Dauphiné

Stages 2 & 4, John Degenkolb
Stage 3, Tony Martin

Ster ZLM Toer

Prologue, Patrick Gretsch
Stage 4, Leigh Howard

Latvia National Time trial, Aleksejs Saramotins
Belarus National Time trial, Kanstantsin Sivtsov
Germany National Time trial, Bert Grabsch
Ireland National Time trial, Matthew Brammeier
Ireland National Road race, Matthew Brammeier
Tour de France

Stages 5, 7, 11, 15 & 21, Mark Cavendish
Stage 20, Tony Martin

Stage 7 Österreich-Rundfahrt, Bert Grabsch
Stage 3 Tour of Utah, Tejay van Garderen
Ride London Classic, Mark Cavendish
Prologue USA Challenge, Patrick Gretsch
Vuelta a España

Stage 10, Tony Martin
Stage 13, Michael Albasini

Tour of Britain

Stages 1 & 9, Mark Cavendish
Stage 5, Mark Renshaw

Overall Tour of Beijing, Tony Martin

Stage 1, Tony Martin

Chrono des Nations, Tony Martin
Prologue and Stage 2 Tour of Southland, Hayden Roulston

== Supplementary statistics ==
Grand Tours by highest finishing position
| Race | 1991 | 1992 | 1993 | 1994 | 1995 | 1996 | 1997 | 1998 | 1999 | 2000 | 2001 | 2002 | 2003 | 2004 | 2005 | 2006 | 2007 | 2008 | 2009 | 2010 | 2011 |
| Giro d'Italia | – | 11 | 33 | 18 | 14 | – | – | – | – | – | 23 | 25 | – | – | 25 | 51 | 18 | 44 | 6 | 9 | 9 |
| Tour de France | – | 10 | 25 | 9 | 25 | 1 | 1 | 2 | 17 | 2 | 2 | 37 | 3 | 2 | 3 | 3 | 7 | 7 | 17 | 37 | 18 |
| Vuelta a España | 17 | – | – | – | 32 | 20 | – | 71 | 1 | 28 | 39 | 47 | 27 | 43 | 7 | 50 | 58 | – | 94 | 2 | 123 |
Major week-long stage races by highest finishing position
| Race | 1991 | 1992 | 1993 | 1994 | 1995 | 1996 | 1997 | 1998 | 1999 | 2000 | 2001 | 2002 | 2003 | 2004 | 2005 | 2006 | 2007 | 2008 | 2009 | 2010 | 2011 |
| Tour Down Under | Did not Exist | | | | | | | | 10 | 3 | 2 | 10 | 9 | – | – | – | – | 1 | 6 | 1 | 2 |
| Paris–Nice | 23 | – | 52 | 36 | 11 | 20 | – | 27 | – | 1 | 7 | 1 | 1 | 15 | 16 | 21 | 33 | 60 | 12 | 26 | 1 |
| Tirreno–Adriatico | – | 19 | 7 | 33 | 20 | 30 | 11 | 3 | 67 | 34 | 51 | 37 | 7 | 3 | 10 | 21 | 2 | 3 | 4 | 6 | 6 |
| Volta a Catalunya | – | – | – | – | – | – | – | 2 | 5 | 4 | 36 | 31 | 18 | – | 11 | 6 | 2 | 9 | 11 | 25 | 22 |
| Tour of the Basque Country | 28 | 18 | 5 | 9 | 29 | 33 | 21 | 13 | 10 | 1 | 38 | 7 | 10 | 20 | 25 | 4 | 74 | 7 | 8 | 5 | 22 |
| Tour de Romandie | 16 | 17 | 11 | 18 | 17 | – | – | – | – | – | 27 | 50 | – | – | 42 | 12 | 52 | 3 | 8 | 3 | 2 |
| Critérium du Dauphiné | – | – | – | – | – | 9 | 1 | 19 | – | – | – | – | – | – | 5 | 3 | 41 | 11 | 24 | 3 | 8 |
| Tour de Suisse | 10 | – | 12 | 19 | 21 | 7 | 3 | 10 | 8 | 5 | 5 | 18 | 1 | 1 | 3 | 1 | 2 | 5 | 2 | 6 | 11 |
| Tour de Pologne | – | – | – | – | – | – | – | – | – | 15 | – | – | – | – | 57 | 31 | 3 | 48 | 3 | 4 | 32 |
| Eneco Tour | 17 | 35 | 3 | 23 | 21 | 6 | 3 | 5 | 7 | 25 | 14 | 5 | 28 | 7 | 9 | 10 | 27 | 3 | 1 | 1 | 22 |
Monument races by highest finishing position
| Race | 1991 | 1992 | 1993 | 1994 | 1995 | 1996 | 1997 | 1998 | 1999 | 2000 | 2001 | 2002 | 2003 | 2004 | 2005 | 2006 | 2007 | 2008 | 2009 | 2010 | 2011 |
| Milan–San Remo | – | 8 | 94 | 16 | 18 | 39 | 1 | 1 | 2 | 1 | 1 | 42 | 6 | 2 | 14 | 15 | 13 | 35 | 1 | 25 | 1 |
| Tour of Flanders | 41 | 7 | 9 | 22 | 20 | 20 | 12 | 43 | 22 | 4 | 12 | 10 | 27 | 1 | 2 | 9 | 13 | 5 | 7 | 16 | 14 |
| Paris–Roubaix | 57 | 6 | 3 | 4 | 9 | 7 | 9 | 23 | 29 | 3 | 7 | 2 | 8 | 15 | 16 | 6 | 7 | 9 | 19 | 10 | 5 |
| Liège–Bastogne–Liège | – | 31 | 38 | 14 | 24 | 26 | 20 | 33 | 9 | 7 | 14 | 6 | 18 | 3 | 1 | 4 | 10 | 12 | 35 | 69 | 18 |
| Giro di Lombardia | – | 7 | 22 | 8 | 34 | 40 | 20 | 32 | 27 | 50 | 11 | 11 | 15 | 4 | 62 | 18 | – | 9 | 32 | 19 | 43 |
Classics by highest finishing position
| Classic | 1991 | 1992 | 1993 | 1994 | 1995 | 1996 | 1997 | 1998 | 1999 | 2000 | 2001 | 2002 | 2003 | 2004 | 2005 | 2006 | 2007 | 2008 | 2009 | 2010 | 2011 |
| Omloop Het Nieuwsblad | – | 19 | 2 | 7 | 18 | 3 | 21 | 46 | 38 | 2 | 13 | 35 | 54 | – | 11 | 11 | 12 | 45 | 5 | 5 | 12 |
| Kuurne–Brussels–Kuurne | 15 | 41 | – | 3 | 10 | 9 | 12 | – | 38 | 49 | 39 | 13 | – | 15 | 10 | 36 | 13 | 51 | 2 | 4 | 22 |
| Strade Bianche | Did not Exist | | | | | | | | | | | | | | | | – | 3 | 1 | 3 | 11 |
| E3 Harelbeke | – | 11 | 2 | 10 | 2 | 5 | 3 | 26 | DNF | 14 | 2 | 8 | 2 | 7 | 2 | 17 | 3 | 6 | 8 | – | – |
| Gent–Wevelgem | 40 | 19 | 5 | 13 | 8 | 11 | 70 | 6 | 9 | 9 | 3 | 8 | 1 | 10 | 9 | 19 | 1 | 10 | 1 | 1 | 7 |
| Amstel Gold Race | 17 | 13 | 3 | 17 | 4 | 9 | 1 | 27 | 13 | 1 | 25 | 9 | 1 | 6 | 21 | 2 | 13 | 20 | 15 | 41 | 36 |
| La Flèche Wallonne | 32 | 16 | 32 | 16 | 44 | 41 | 13 | 44 | 6 | 28 | 26 | 20 | 62 | 3 | 12 | 5 | 56 | 1 | 6 | 10 | 10 |
| Clásica de San Sebastián | – | 46 | 20 | 23 | 21 | 1 | 8 | 9 | 13 | 55 | 14 | 18 | 44 | 63 | 27 | 98 | 74 | 22 | 9 | 40 | 43 |
| Paris–Tours | 14 | 2 | 22 | 1 | 4 | 23 | 63 | 30 | 35 | 11 | 3 | 3 | 1 | 7 | 1 | 17 | – | 55 | 44 | 9 | 11 |

== See also ==
- HTC–Highroad
- List of HTC–Highroad riders
- 2011 HTC–Highroad season
- 2010 Team HTC–Columbia season
