= Erik Zabel =

German cyclist

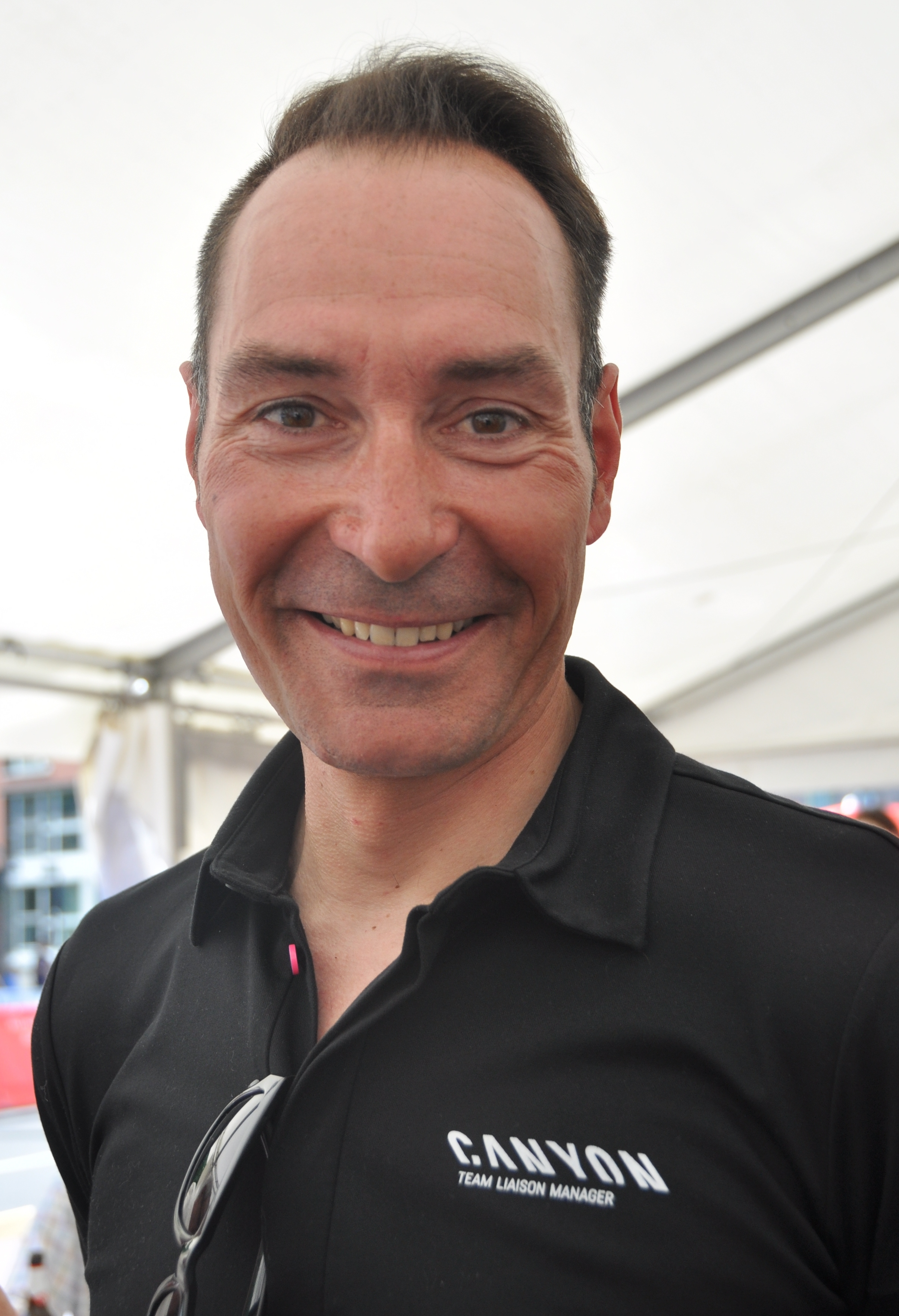
- Zabel at the 2017 Rund um Köln

Personal information
- Full name: Erik Zabel
- Nickname: Ete
- Born: 7 July 1970 (age 56) East Berlin, East Germany
- Height: 1.76 m (5 ft 9 1/2 in)
- Weight: 69 kg (152 lb; 10 st 12 lb)

Cycling career
- Sport: Cycling

Amateur teams
- TSC Berlin
- RC Olympia Dortmund

Professional teams
- 1993–2005: Team Telekom
- 2006–2008: Team Milram

Managerial teams
- 2009–2011: Team Columbia–High Road
- 2012–2013: Team Katusha

Major wins
- Grand Tours Tour de France Points classification (1996–2001) 12 individual stages (1995–1997, 2000–2002) Vuelta a España Points classification (2002–2004) 8 individual stages (2001, 2003, 2006, 2007) One-day races and Classics National Road Race Championships (1998, 2003) Milan–San Remo (1997, 1998, 2000, 2001) Paris–Tours (1994, 2003, 2005) Amstel Gold Race (2000) HEW Cyclassics (2001) Eschborn–Frankfurt (1999, 2002, 2005) Other UCI Road World Cup (2000)
Medal record
Representing Germany
Men's road bicycle racing
UCI Road World Championships
Silver medal – second place	2004 Verona	Elite Men's Road Race
Silver medal – second place	2006 Salzburg	Elite Men's Road Race
Bronze medal – third place	2002 Zolder	Elite Men's Road Race

Erik Zabel (German pronunciation: [ˈeːʁɪk ˈt͡saːbl̩]; born 7 July 1970) is a German former professional road bicycle racer who raced for most of his career with Team Telekom. With 152 professional wins and 211 wins in his career, he is considered by some to be one of the greatest German cyclists and cycling sprinters of all time. Zabel won a record nine points classifications in grands tours including the points classification in the Tour de France six consecutive years between 1996 and 2001 and the points classification in the Vuelta a España in 2002, 2003 and 2004. Zabel won the Milan–San Remo four times and numerous six-day track events. He was one of the few road cyclists of recent times who raced all year, including track cycling in winter. For season 2012 he joined Team Katusha as sprint coach. He previously held that same position with the HTC–Highroad team until their dissolution. Zabel admitted to doping from 1996 to 2003. He is the father of cyclist Rick Zabel.

== Early life and amateur career ==
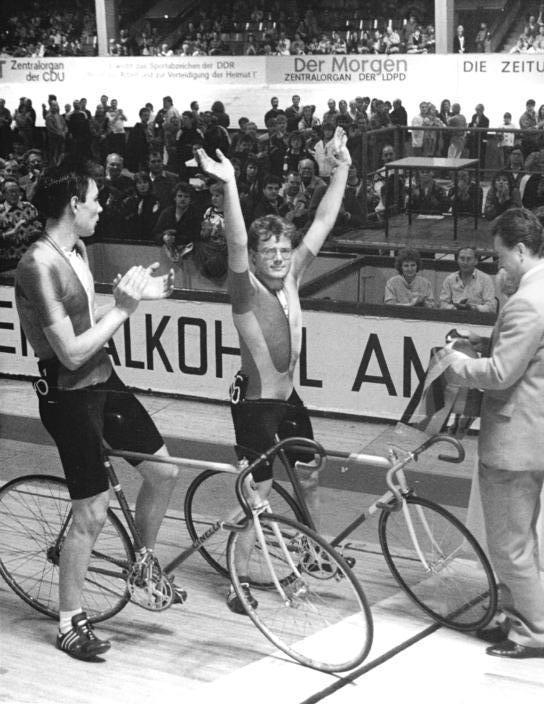
Zabel (left) applauding for Frank Seeland

Zabel grew up in East Berlin, in the borough Marzahn. His father Detlev was a professional cyclist. His first international success as a junior was at the track world championship when he was third in the team pursuit on the East German team. In 1988 he was fifth in the points race. In 1989, as a 19-year-old, he was included in the East German national track team for professionals. That year he became national champion of East Germany in the individual pursuit.

After the Fall of the Berlin Wall he moved to Dortmund and became part of the amateur team RC Olympia Dortmund, led by Hennes Junkermann. He was second at the first national road championship of re-unified Germany in 1991, first at the regional championship of North Rhine-Westphalia and was included in the amateur German team for the World Championship in August. In 1992 he made name as a strong sprinter, winning the green jersey in the Peace Race and taking several stage wins in stage races. In July he was fourth in the road race of the 1992 Olympic Games in Barcelona, where he won the sprint of the peloton.

== Professional career ==
=== 1993–1995: The early years ===
In late 1992 he turned professional with the small German team Union-Frondenberg, before changing in 1993 to Team Telekom where he further developed as a sprinter. On 27 April 1994 Zabel tested positive for clostebol metabolites in Veenendaal–Veenendaal. He was fined 3000 Swiss francs and lost 50 points. A suspension on probation was cancelled. Later that year he won Paris–Tours in a mass sprint, his first win in a classic race.

In 1995 he won two stages on the Tour de France, his first success on a grand tour.

=== 1996–1999: Green jerseys and classics victories ===
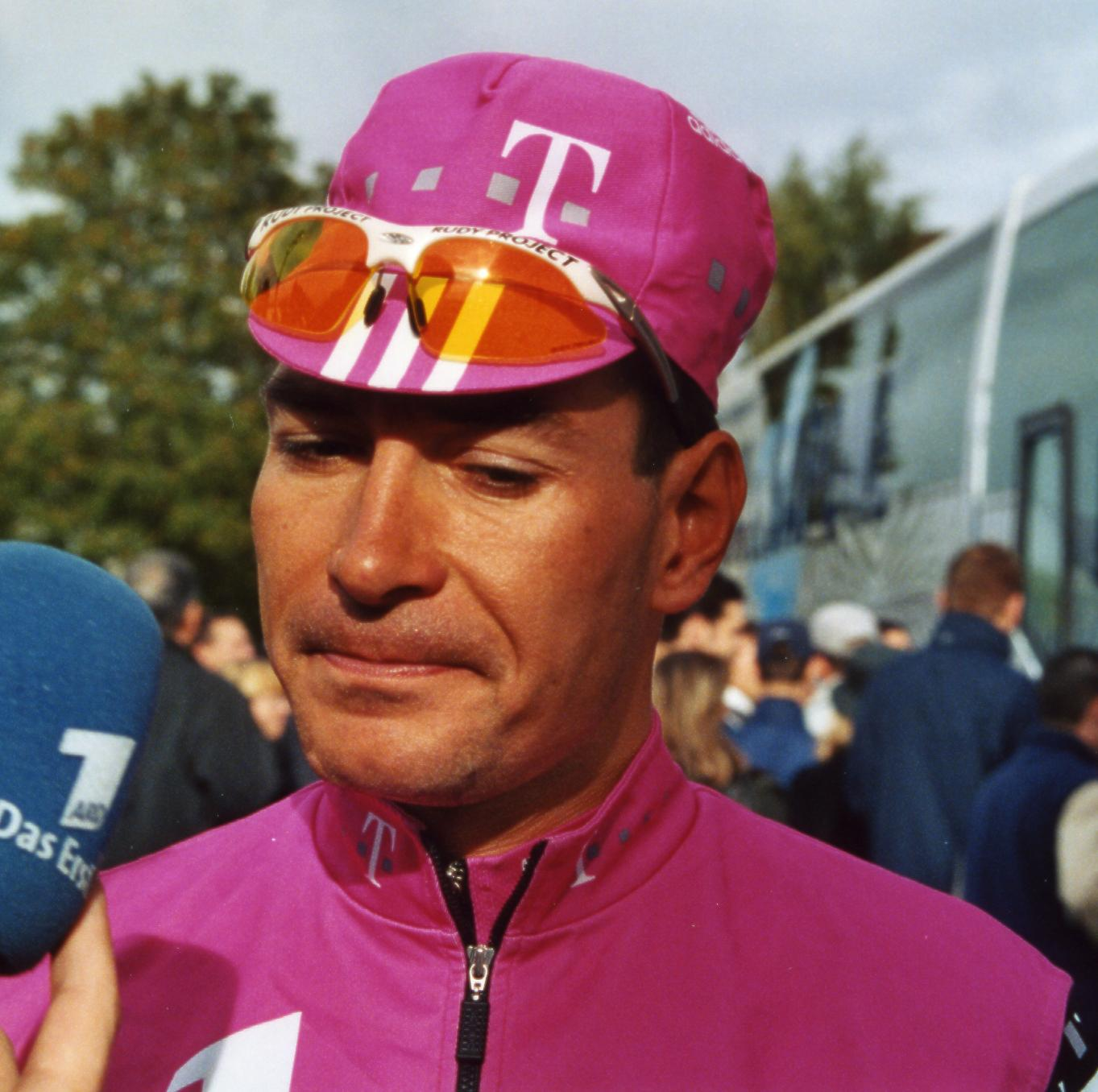
Zabel during Paris–Tours 2002

In 1996 he won again two stages in the Tour de France and won the points classification. He took over the green jersey in the 10th stage and wore it until the end of the Tour. That year his Telekom team took first and second place in the general classification as well, with Bjarne Riis and Jan Ullrich respectively.

In 1997 Zabel won his first monument classic, Milan–San Remo. He was the only sprinter in a group of forty to make it to the finish and easily won the sprint. Later that year, he won three stages on the Tour de France and secured his second green jersey.

In 1998 he won Milan–San Remo a second time and became national road champion of Germany. He won his third green jersey in the Tour de France, however this time without a stage victory.

In 1999 he was second in Milan–San Remo, winning the peloton sprint behind Andrei Tchmil who had broken clear in the final kilometer and managed to maintain his effort. He won the important German semi-classic Rund um den Henninger Turm in Frankfurt and won his fourth consecutive green jersey, equalling Sean Kelly's record, again without winning a stage.

=== 2000–2002: World number one ===
In 2000 he won two legs of the UCI Road World Cup in spring: Milan–San Remo a third time and a surprise win in the Amstel Gold Race, beating Michael Boogerd in a bunch sprint. In the summer he won an unprecedented fifth green jersey, thereby surpassing Kelly's previous record. At the end of the year, he was the best overall in the World Cup and number two on UCI World Ranking.

In 2001 he won Milan–San Remo a fourth time, the most since cycling legend Eddy Merckx, earning him the nickname Signore Milano-Sanremo in Italy. He won the points classification in the Tour de France a sixth consecutive time, winning three stages furthermore. Zabel's unique streak of six green jerseys was owed to his all-round ability: he was one of the strongest sprinters, but could also climb reasonably well. This meant that, apart from taking the lead in the general classification in the Tour de France thanks to time bonuses, he could pick up further victories when other sprinters had retired and take the green jersey (as symbol for the leader of the points classification) to Paris. One memorable victory in securing the green jersey was in the 2001 Tour de France, when his competition with Australian Stuart O'Grady lasted from the first week until the final stage in Paris, where Zabel's better placing took the green jersey off O'Grady's shoulders. Later that summer, he also won the HEW Cyclassics, Germany's biggest one-day classic, and his seventh World Cup race. In September he won three stages, consecutive, in the Vuelta a España and was fifth in the World Championship road race in Lisbon.

2001 turned out to be his most successful year ever. At the end of the year, he had won 29 races and was number one on the closing standings of the world ranking.

In 2002 he missed the breakaway in Milan–San Remo but won Rund um den Henninger Turm a second time. In the summer, he failed to win a seventh consecutive green jersey in the Tour de France. He won one stage victory, his twelfth in total, but was ultimately beaten by Australian Robbie McEwen in the final points classification. He won the points classification in the Vuelta a España instead, without winning a stage. In Zolder, in Belgium, he finished third at the World championship in a peloton sprint behind Mario Cipollini and Robbie McEwen. At the end of the year, he maintained his number one position on the world ranking.

Zabel would have retroactively been awarded the Vélo d'Or for his performances of 2000 and 2001, but after Lance Armstrong was stripped of the titles in 2012–2013, as with each other races, the 2nd-place finisher was not promoted to 1st.

=== 2003–2005: Vuelta success and podium places ===
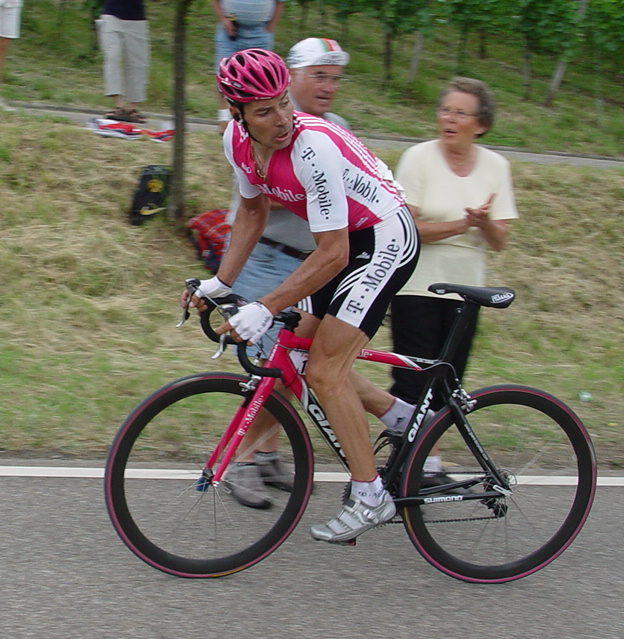
Zabel in the national road championship, 2004

In 2003 he became national road champion of Germany for a second time, but failed to win a stage in the Tour de France and was third in the final points classification. He won two stages in the Vuelta and again won the points classification of the race. In October he won Paris–Tours for the second time in his career and was awarded the unofficial Ruban Jaune for winning the race in a record average speed for a one-day race of 47.55 km per hour. The record stood until 2010 when Óscar Freire won Paris–Tours riding at an average of speed of 47.73 km per hour. He ended the year as number two on the world ranking behind Paolo Bettini.

In 2004 Zabel began the season losing what would have been his fifth Milan–San Remo. He looked secure to win the sprint, but lifted his arms to celebrate too early and was ultimately foiled by Óscar Freire. He was third in the points classification of the Tour de France and first in the Vuelta points classification, but despite numerous second and third places, he didn't win a stage. His first place in the Vuelta was also his ninth win in a points classification of a grand tour, an all-time record. At the 2004 Olympics in Athens, he was again fourth in the road race, again winning the sprint behind three escapees and so missing an olympic medal twelve years after Barcelona. In October, after 9 victories and 18 second places throughout the season, he ended the year as he had begun it: second behind Freire, this time in the world championship in Verona.

In 2005 Zabel became the first to win Rund um den Henninger-Turm in Frankfurt a third time, in his first win on the season. In May he participated for the first time in his career in the Giro d'Italia, seeking the only points classification he had not yet won, but failed to win a stage and was sixth in the points ranking. His T-Mobile Team, keen on winning the Tour de France with Jan Ullrich, decided not to include him in the selection for that year's Tour, much to the discontent of Zabel, who declared at the start of the HEW Cyclassics that he would be leaving the team at the end of the year. He rode the Vuelta, but was unable to win a stage or the points classification despite multiple second places behind Alessandro Petacchi, and played no role in the World Championship in Madrid. In October he won Paris–Tours a third time, equalling the record in the classic of Gustave Danneels, Paul Maye and Guido Reybrouck.

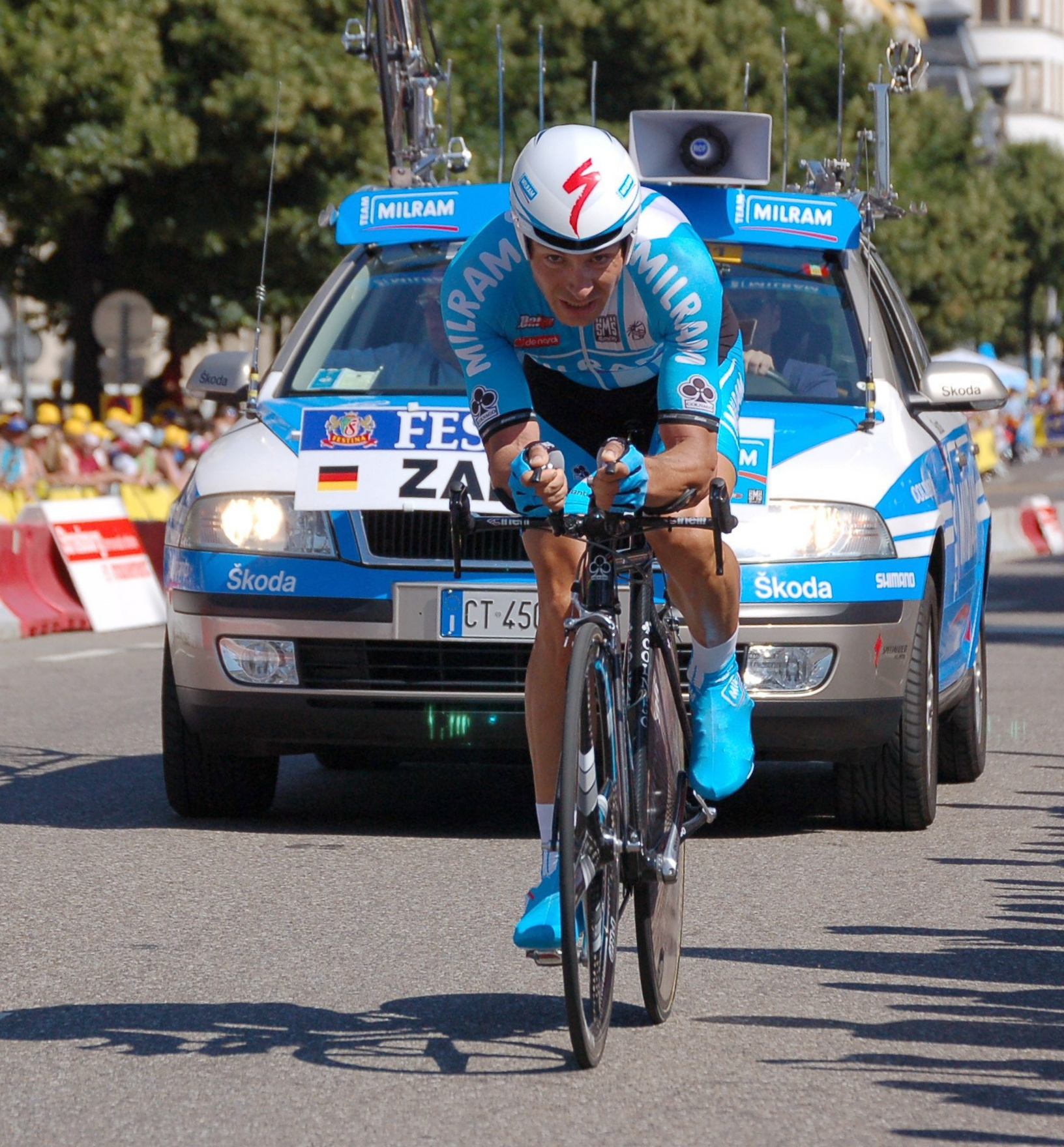
Zabel at prologue of the Tour de France 2006 in Strasbourg

=== 2006–2008: Team Milram ===
At 35, Zabel left his team Telekom after 13 years, and signed on for the Italian-German team Milram in 2006, where he teamed up with Alessandro Petacchi. Petacchi was considered the fastest sprinter in the world by then and would focus on an Italian program, but the Italian broke his knee in the Giro, making Zabel the leader of the team that season. He had to wait until 24 May to take his first win of the season, a stage in the Bayern Rundfahrt. In the Tour, he was the team leader in the absence of a GC contender, and was ultimately second in the points classification, but his best stage results were two third places. In the Vuelta he won two stages, his first ProTour wins in 2006, before heading to the world championship. In Salzburg, he finished second in a three-man sprint with Paolo Bettini and Alejandro Valverde, his third podium finish in the world championships.

In 2007 he won two stages in the Bayern Rundfahrt and one in the Tour de Suisse. He was again captain in the team selection for the Tour de France, after Alessandro Petacchi had been suspended for a positive salbutamol test. He wore the green jersey one day, was twice second and once third in a stage, but was third once more in the final points classification. In July he won one stage in the Deutschland Tour, his 13th in total, and won the race's points classification for the seventh time. In September he won the seventh stage in the Tour of Spain, ahead of world champion Bettini, totalling eight stage victories in the Vuelta throughout his career.

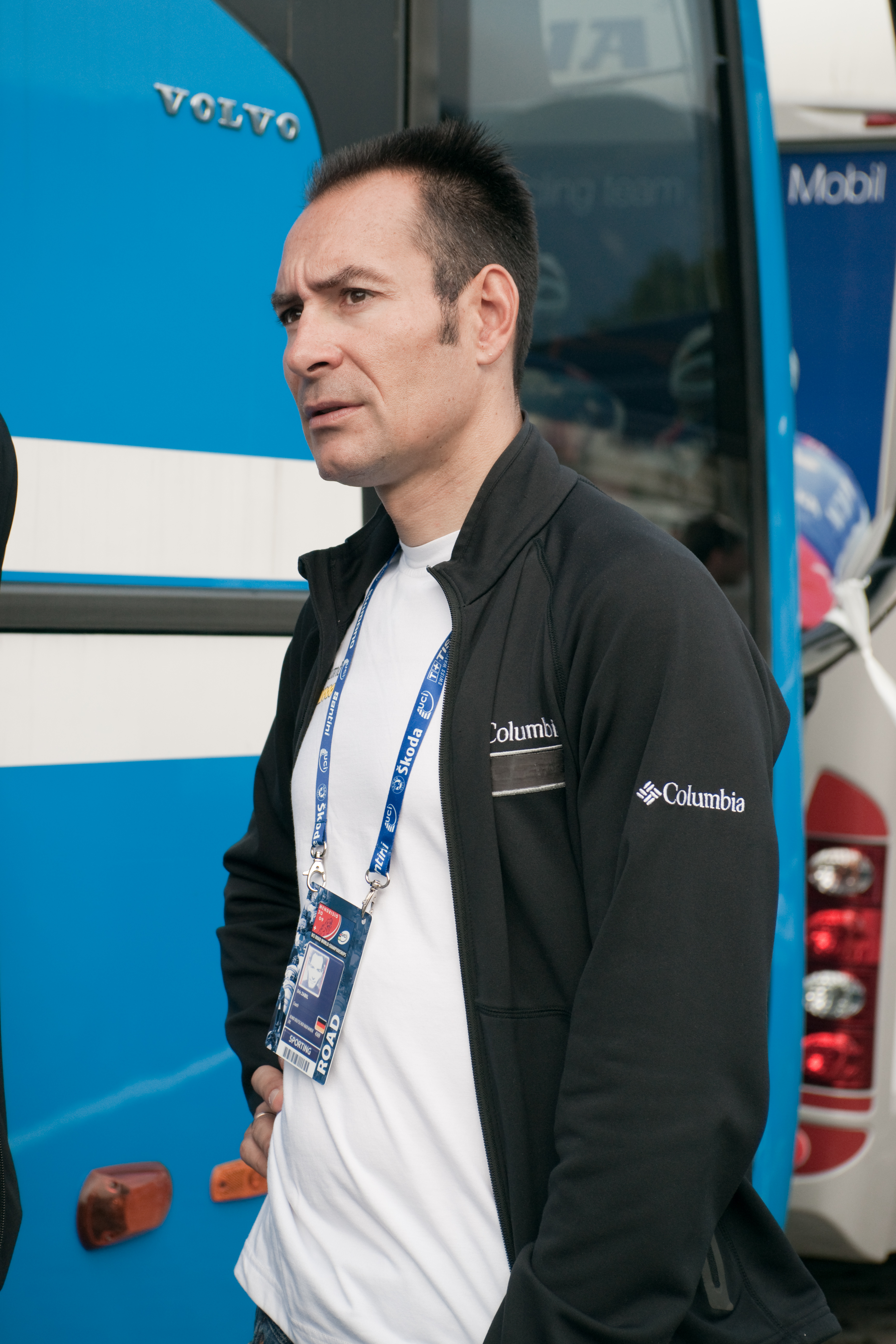
Zabel in 2009

In 2008 he won one race, a stage win in the Tour of Valencia early in the season. In his last participation in the Tour de France, at age 38, he was once more third in the final points classification. In September 2008 Zabel stated he would retire the following month after 16 years as a professional cyclist with 209 professional road victories and many more podium finishes. In December 2008 he joined the Columbia team as an advisor, to work alongside riders such as Mark Cavendish, André Greipel and Mark Renshaw.

== Doping confession ==
On 24 May 2007, Zabel and former Team Telekom teammate Rolf Aldag admitted using EPO to prepare for the 1996 Tour de France. Zabel told at a press conference he experimented with it for a week and stopped due to side effects. He apologized for lying about using EPO in the past. His confession was triggered by accusations by former Team Telekom masseur Jef d'Hont and the confessions of Bert Dietz, Udo Bölts and Christian Henn, all former members of Team Telekom. D'Hont's book, of which excerpts were printed in the German political magazine Der Spiegel in April 2007, accused members of Team Telekom of systematic doping with EPO in the mid-1990s.

His name was also on the list of doping tests published by the French Senate on 24 July 2013 that were collected during the 1998 Tour de France and found positive for EPO when retested in 2004. As a result, Zabel was suspended from his coaching role with Team Katusha and resigned his membership of the UCI's Professional Cycling Council.

Days later, Zabel finally admitted to sueddeutsche.de and revealed the level of his truth-bending. He told the German publication that he actually used the substance between 1996 and 2003, as well as other banned products and methods. "EPO, cortisone, then even blood doping: it is still a big deal", he said.

== Major results ==
=== Road ===
1992
1st Stage 9 Peace Race
4th Road race, Olympic Games
1993
1st Tour de Berne
1st Points classification, Vuelta a Burgos
7th Overall Tirreno–Adriatico

1st Stage 1

8th Road race, National Road Championships
10th Overall Settimana Ciclistica Internazionale
1994
1st Paris–Tours
1st Classic Haribo
Tour de l'Avenir

1st Stages 2, 5, 7 & 8

Vuelta a Aragón

1st Stages 2, 3 & 5

7th Omloop Het Volk
10th Japan Cup
1995
Tour de France

1st Stages 6 & 17

Tour de Suisse

1st Stages 2 & 3

1st Stage 1 Tirreno–Adriatico
1st Stage 2 Vuelta a Aragón
3rd Overall Four Days of Dunkirk

1st Stages 1 & 7

4th Dwars door België
7th Road race, National Road Championships
7th Overall Vuelta a Andalucía
8th Gent–Wevelgem
9th Scheldeprijs
1996
1st Rund um Köln
Tour de France

1st Points classification
1st Stages 3 & 10

Setmana Catalana de Ciclisme

1st Points classification
1st Stages 1, 2 & 4

1st Stage 2 Four Days of Dunkirk
1st Stage 2 Tour de Luxembourg
1st Stage 3 Vuelta a Andalucía
1st Stage 5 Ronde van Nederland
5th Scheldeprijs
6th Rund um den Henninger Turm
7th Road race, National Road Championships
8th Telekom Grand Prix (with Jens Heppner)
1997
1st Overall Vuelta a Andalucía

1st Stage 1

1st Milan–San Remo
1st Scheldeprijs
1st Trofeo Luis Puig
1st Trofeo Palma de Mallorca
Tour de France

1st Points classification
1st Stages 3, 7 & 8

1st Stage 1 Tour de Suisse
1st Stage 1 Tour de Luxembourg
1st Stage 3 Volta a la Comunitat Valenciana
1st Stage 4 Ronde van Nederland
2nd Trofeo Alcúdia
2nd Trofeo Calvià
2nd Trofeo Manacor
3rd Road race, National Road Championships
7th Trofeo Sóller
8th Grand Prix Breitling (with Giovanni Lombardi)
10th Overall Bayern Rundfahrt

1st Stages 2 & 4

1998
1st Road race, National Road Championships
1st Milan–San Remo
1st Delta Profronde
1st Trofeo Palma de Mallorca
Tirreno–Adriatico

1st Points classification
1st Stages 2, 7 & 8

Bayern Rundfahrt

1st Stages 1 & 4

Vuelta a Aragón

1st Stages 4 & 5

1st Stage 1 Volta a la Comunitat Valenciana
1st Stage 2 Route du Sud
1st Stage 4 Tour de Luxembourg
Tour de France

1st Points classification
Held after Stage 2

3rd Grand Prix Breitling (with Jens Heppner)
4th Classic Haribo
6th Gent–Wevelgem
7th Trofeo Manacor
9th Trofeo Cala Ratjada-Cala Millor
10th Rund um den Henninger Turm
1999
1st Rund um den Henninger Turm
1st Sparkassen Giro Bochum
Volta a Catalunya

1st Stages 4 & 5

Bayern Rundfahrt

1st Stages 2 & 4

Tour Down Under

1st Stages 2 & 4

Deutschland Tour

1st Points classification
1st Stage 6

1st Stage 1 Vuelta a Aragón
1st Stage 2 Volta a la Comunitat Valenciana
1st Points classification, Tour de France
2nd Milan–San Remo
2nd Scheldeprijs
3rd Road race, National Road Championships
3rd Trofeo Manacor
5th Trofeo Palma de Mallorca
9th HEW Cyclassics
2000
1st Overall UCI Road World Cup
1st Milan–San Remo
1st Amstel Gold Race
1st Trofeo Luis Puig
Tour de France

1st Points classification
1st Stage 20

Volta a Catalunya

1st Stages 2 & 3

Deutschland Tour

1st Points classification
1st Stages 2, 5 & 8

Setmana Catalana de Ciclisme

1st Points classification
1st Stages 3 & 4

1st Stage 1 Vuelta a Andalucía
1st Stage 2 Bayern Rundfahrt
1st Stage 3a International Rheinland-Pfalz Rundfahrt
1st Stage 4 Tirreno–Adriatico
1st Stage 4 Volta a la Comunitat Valenciana
1st Stage 5 Tour Down Under
2nd Trofeo Palma de Mallorca
2nd Trofeo Cala Millor
2nd Trofeo Manacor
3rd Paris–Roubaix
3rd Trofeo Sóller
4th Tour of Flanders
4th HEW Cyclassics
7th Scheldeprijs
10th Road race, National Road Championships
2001
1st Milan–San Remo
1st HEW Cyclassics
1st Trofeo Luis Puig
1st Trofeo Palma de Mallorca
1st Trofeo Manacor
Tour de France

1st Points classification
1st Stages 1, 3 & 19

Vuelta a España

1st Stages 2, 3 & 4
Held after Stages 3–11 & 18–19

Tour de Suisse

1st Points classification
1st Stages 1 & 8

Bayern Rundfahrt

1st Points classification
1st Stages 3, 4, 5 & 6

Deutschland Tour

1st Points classification
1st Stages 2, 3 & 8

1st Stage 2 Volta a la Comunitat Valenciana
1st Stage 3 Vuelta a Andalucía
2nd Road race, National Road Championships
2nd Trofeo Sóller
2nd Trofeo Calvià
3rd Paris–Tours
5th Road race, UCI Road World Championships
6th Trofeo Alcúdia
9th Gent–Wevelgem
2002
1st Rund um den Henninger Turm
Tour de France

1st Stage 6
Held after Stage 3
Held after Stages 1–9 & 11–12

Tour de Suisse

1st Points classification
1st Stages 2 & 8

Tirreno–Adriatico

1st Points classification
1st Stage 1

Deutschland Tour

1st Points classification
1st Stages 1, 2, 5 & 7

Ronde van Nederland

1st Points classification
1st Stage 1

Setmana Catalana de Ciclisme

1st Points classification
1st Stages 1 & 2a

1st Stage 1 Tour de Luxembourg
1st Stage 2 Vuelta a Aragón
1st Stage 6 Bayern Rundfahrt
1st Points classification, Vuelta a España
2nd Trofeo Palma de Mallorca
3rd Road race, UCI Road World Championships
3rd Road race, National Road Championships
3rd Paris–Tours
3rd Trofeo Luis Puig
3rd Trofeo Manacor
9th Gent–Wevelgem
9th Amstel Gold Race
10th Overall Vuelta a Andalucía

1st Points classification

10th Tour of Flanders
2003
1st Road race, National Road Championships
1st Paris–Tours
Vuelta a España

1st Points classification
1st Stages 10 & 11

Deutschland Tour

1st Points classification
1st Stage 1

Ronde van Nederland

1st Points classification
1st Stage 3

Setmana Catalana de Ciclisme

1st Points classification
1st Stages 1 & 5

1st Stage 3 Vuelta a Murcia
1st Stage 4 Bayern Rundfahrt
2nd Rund um den Henninger Turm
2nd Trofeo Alcúdia
3rd Trofeo Cala Millor
3rd Trofeo Manacor
4th Sparkassen Giro Bochum
4th Rund um die Hainleite
5th Scheldeprijs
5th Grand Prix Pino Cerami
6th Milan–San Remo
6th HEW Cyclassics
7th Trofeo Palma de Mallorca
8th Overall Tirreno–Adriatico
2004
1st Rund um Köln
Bayern Rundfahrt

1st Points classification
1st Stages 2 & 5

Peace Race

1st Stages 7 & 9

1st Stage 5 Vuelta a Andalucía
1st Points classification, Vuelta a España
2nd Road race, UCI Road World Championships
2nd Milan–San Remo
2nd Trofeo Alcúdia
2nd Trofeo Cala Millor
3rd Overall Tirreno–Adriatico

1st Points classification

3rd Trofeo Palma de Mallorca
4th Road race, Olympic Games
4th Trofeo Luis Puig
7th HEW Cyclassics
7th Rund um den Henninger Turm
7th Trofeo Sóller
10th Rund um die Hainleite
2005
1st Paris–Tours
1st Rund um den Henninger Turm
3rd Road race, National Road Championships
4th Tour of Flanders
4th Trofeo Alcudia
5th Trofeo Palma de Mallorca
9th Gent–Wevelgem
2006
Vuelta a España

1st Stages 4 & 21

1st Stage 1 Bayern Rundfahrt
1st Points classification, Deutschland Tour
2nd Road race, UCI Road World Championships
2nd Overall Tour of Qatar
2nd Vattenfall Cyclassics
3rd Giro della Provincia di Lucca
3rd International Grand Prix Doha
3rd Sparkassen Giro Bochum
4th Rund um den Henninger Turm
5th Milano–Torino
8th Brabantse Pijl
2007
Bayern Rundfahrt

1st Points classification
1st Stages 2 & 3

Deutschland Tour

1st Points classification
1st Stage 3

1st Stage 7 Vuelta a España
1st Stage 1 Tour de Suisse
5th Overall Niedersachsen Rundfahrt
5th Vattenfall Cyclassics
6th Milan–San Remo
7th Scheldeprijs
Tour de France

Held after Stage 5

2008
1st Stage 2 Volta a la Comunitat Valenciana
2nd Road race, National Road Championships
2nd Münsterland Giro
4th Gent–Wevelgem
4th Scheldeprijs
7th Paris–Tours

==== Grand Tour general classification results timeline ====
Grand Tour	1994	1995	1996	1997	1998	1999	2000	2001	2002	2003	2004	2005	2006	2007	2008
Giro d'Italia	—	—	—	—	—	—	—	—	—	—	—	63	—	—	80
Tour de France	DNF	90	82	66	62	89	61	96	82	107	59	—	84	79	41
/ Vuelta a España	—	DNF	—	—	—	—	—	86	69	72	43	63	62	73	49

==== Classic results timeline ====
Monument	1993	1994	1995	1996	1997	1998	1999	2000	2001	2002	2003	2004	2005	2006	2007	2008
Milan–San Remo	94	16	69	39	1	1	2	1	1	70	6	2	14	21	6	17
Tour of Flanders	59	22	69	20	39	43	22	4	53	10	43	—	4	11	DNF	67
Paris–Roubaix	—	—	44	36	41	—	29	3	—	26	15	—	—	12	—	—
Liège–Bastogne–Liège	—	—	—	—	—	—	—	39	—	—	—	81	—	—	—	—
Giro di Lombardia	60	—	—	—	—	—	—	—	—	—	—	—	—	—	—	—
Classic	1993	1994	1995	1996	1997	1998	1999	2000	2001	2002	2003	2004	2005	2006	2007	2008
Gent–Wevelgem	—	36	8	11	93	6	23	41	9	8	—	—	9	41	—	4
Scheldeprijs	60	—	9	5	1	—	2	7	—	—	5	—	—	—	7	4
Amstel Gold Race	—	—	—	38	62	39	13	1	DNF	9	15	16	49	—	58	23
Frankfurt Grand Prix	46	46	53	6	—	10	1	29	53	1	2	7	1	4	13	—
Hamburg Cyclassics	—	—	—	—	—	22	9	4	1	77	6	7	15	2	5	—

Legend
—	Did not compete
DNF	Did not finish

=== Six Day results ===
1995
1st Six Days of Munich (with Etienne De Wilde)
1996
1st Six Days of Dortmund (with Rolf Aldag)
2000
1st Six Days of Dortmund (with Rolf Aldag)
2001
1st Six Days of Dortmund (with Rolf Aldag)
1st Six Days of Munich (with Silvio Martinello)
2005
1st Six Days of Munich (with Robert Bartko)
1st Six Days of Dortmund (with Rolf Aldag)
2006
1st Six Days of Munich (with Bruno Risi)
1st Six Days of Dortmund (with Bruno Risi)
2008
1st Six Days of Dortmund (with Leif Lampater)
2009
1st Six Days of Berlin (with Robert Bartko)
1st Six Days of Bremen (with Leif Lampater)
1st Six Days of Dortmund (with Leif Lampater)

== See also ==
- List of doping cases in sport
- List of doping cases in cycling

Awards
Preceded by Nils Schumann	German Sportsman of the Year; 2001	Succeeded by Sven Hannawald
