= Zbigniew Spruch =

Polish cyclist (born 1965)

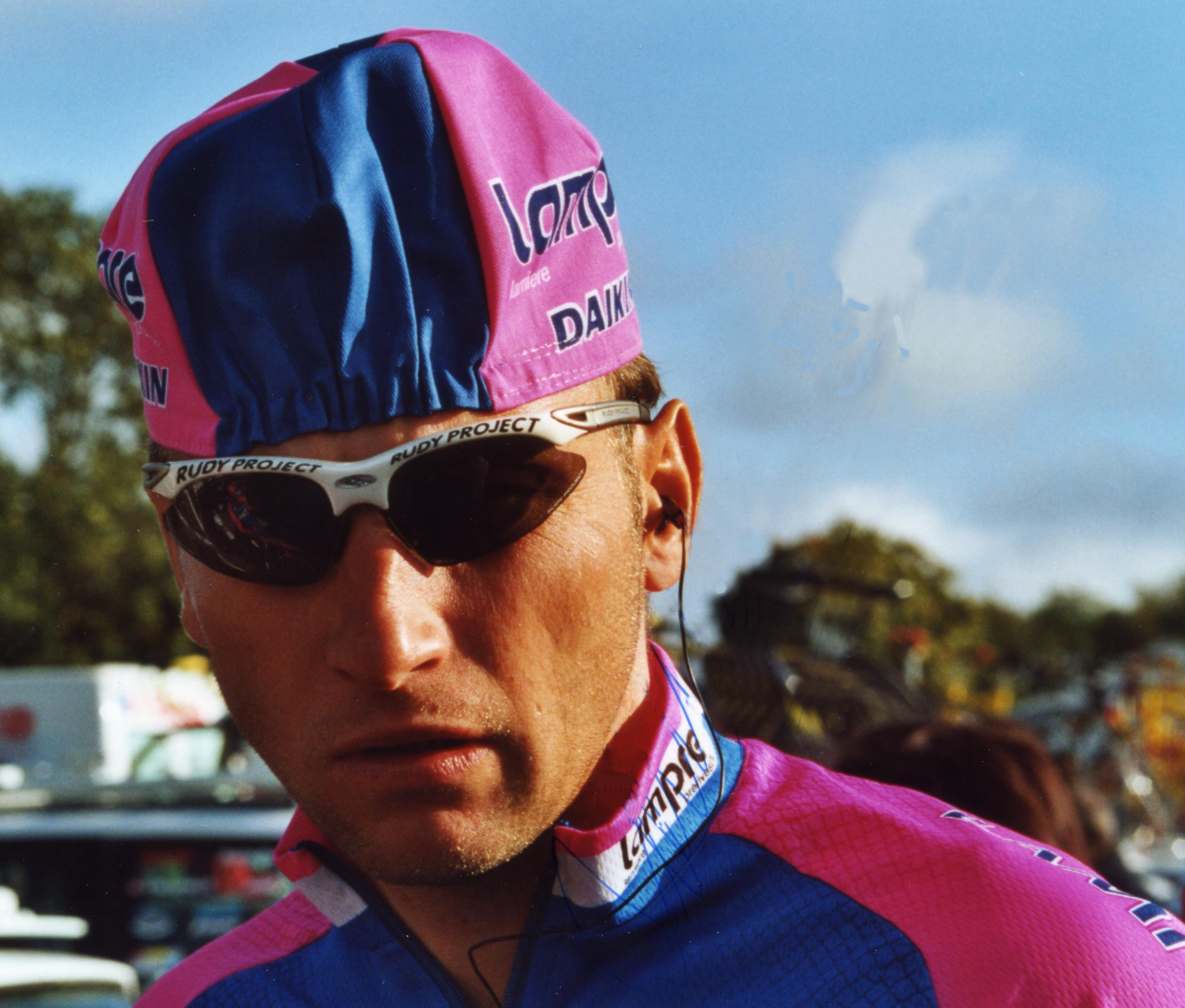

Personal information
- Full name: Zbigniew Spruch
- Born: 13 December 1965 (age 60) Kożuchów, Poland
- Height: 1.78 m (5 ft 10 in)
- Weight: 68 kg (150 lb)

Cycling career
- Sport: Cycling
- Current team: Retired
- Discipline: Road
- Role: Rider

Professional teams
- 1992–1996: Lampre–Colnago
- 1997–1998: Mapei–GB
- 1999–2003: Lampre–Daikin

Major wins
- Stage races Tour de Pologne (1995)
Medal record
Representing Poland
Men's road bicycle racing
UCI Road World Championships
Silver medal – second place	2000 Plouay	Road race

Zbigniew Spruch (born 13 December 1965) is a Polish former professional road bicycle racer. He won the Tour de Pologne in 1995 and placed second at the 2000 UCI Road World Championships. Spruch was a professional cyclist for 12 years, starting at the Lampre–Colnago team in 1992 with a two year stint at Mapei–GB for 1997 & 1998. He then finished his career back at the newly founded Lampre–Daikin squad. Spruch only achieved three professional wins in his career but amassed over 120 amateur victories.

== Career ==
Spurch won the overall at the 1995 Tour de Pologne. At the 1999 Tirreno–Adriatico Spruch came close to his third professional win when favorites for the stage Nicola Minali and Mario Cipollini crashed in the final 75 metres. Unfortunately Spruch was edged out by Steven de Jongh.

The Biggest non-victory of Spurch's career was finishing second at the Road race of the 2000 UCI Road World Championships. Spurch was in the final bunch chasing down Michele Bartoli who had attacked with less than 1 km to go. The bunch caught Bartoli just before the line with Spruch tucked in behind Romāns Vainšteins, he could not sprint past the Latvian who took gold.

== Major results ==
1987
9th Overall Olympia's Tour
10th Overall Tour de Pologne
1988
1st Stage 3 Peace Race
1st Stage 5 Niedersachsen Rundfahrt
1989
1st Stage 2 Peace Race
1st Stages 4 & 6 Niedersachsen Rundfahrt
6th Overall Tour de Pologne

1st Stages 3 & 5

1990
1st Stage 7 Vuelta a Cuba
2nd Overall Tour of Małopolska

1st Stage 2

1991
1st Memorial Grundmanna I Wizowskiego
3rd Overall Rheinland-Pfalz Rundfahrt
5th Overall Tour of Małopolska
7th Overall Tour de Pologne

1st Stages 2, 3 & 4

1992
6th Trofeo Laigueglia
8th Giro di Campania
9th Giro del Piemonte
1993
5th Overall KBC Driedaagse van De Panne-Koksijde
6th Overall Tour de Pologne

1st Points classification

1994
2nd Trofeo Pantalica
3rd Paris-Tours
6th Gent-Wevelgem
7th Overall Tour de Pologne
1995 (1 Pro win)
1st Overall Tour de Pologne

1st Points classification
1st Stage 2

4th Overall 4 Jours de Dunkerque
5th Overall Grand Prix du Midi Libre

1st Stage 1

6th Gent-Wevelgem
1996
9th Road race, Olympic Games
1997
2nd Overall Étoile de Bessèges
1998 (2)
1st Stage 5 Settimana Ciclistica Lombarda
5th Overall Tirreno-Adriatico
7th Overall Tour de Pologne

1st Points classification
1st Stage 1

1999
2nd Gent–Wevelgem
3rd Milan-San Remo
5th Tour of Flanders
9th Scheldeprijs
2000
2nd Road race, UCI Road World Championships
4th Milan-San Remo
7th Overall KBC Driedaagse van De Panne-Koksijde
7th Paris-Tours
8th Amstel Gold Race
9th Tour of Flanders
2001
10th Paris-Tours

=== Grand Tour general classification results timeline ===
Grand Tour	1992	1993	1994	1995	1996	1997	1998	1999	2000	2001	2002
Giro d'Italia	47	—	66	DNF	47	100	72	—	—	—	—
Tour de France	—	DNF	—	—	DNF	—	—	DNF	—	—	—
/ Vuelta a España	—	46	—	—	—	—	—	DNF	—	—	DNF

=== Monuments results timeline ===
Monument	1992	1993	1994	1995	1996	1997	1998	1999	2000	2001	2002	2003
Milan–San Remo	37	48	14	23	113	63	—	3	4	—	98	59
Tour of Flanders	—	40	15	71	63	DNF	—	5	9	—	38	37
Paris–Roubaix	—	—	—	—	—	51	—	14	15	—	15	DNF
Liège–Bastogne–Liège	—	—	—	47	—	—	—	12	15	—	—	DNF
Giro di Lombardia	—	—	—	—	—	—	—	—	DNF	—	—	—

Legend
—	Did not compete
DNF	Did not finish
