= Hell on Wheels (2004 film) =

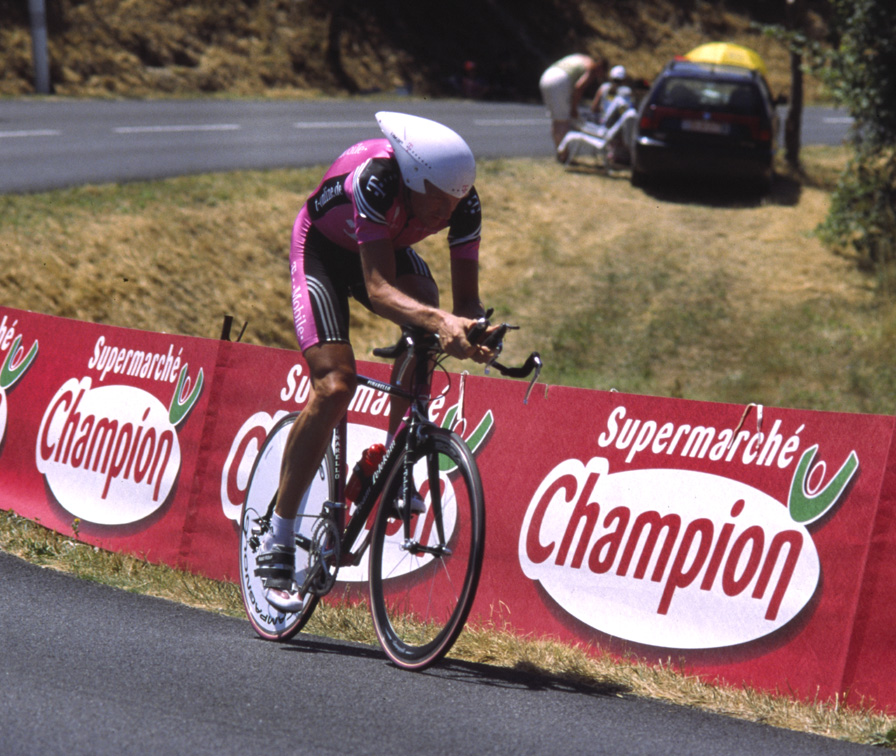
- Rolf Aldag, individual time trial Tour de France 2003
- Directed by: Pepe Danquart
- Written by: Mark Christopher
- Produced by: Mirjam Quinte
- Starring: Erik Zabel; Rolf Aldag
- Release date: 10 June 2004
- Running time: 120 minutes
- Country: Germany
- Languages: English; French; German

Höllentour (literally meaning "Hell Tour") is a 2004 German film. The US release (with English subtitles) was titled Hell on Wheels. The film is a record of the 100th anniversary Tour de France in 2003 from the perspective of Germany's Team Telekom, focusing on riders Erik Zabel and Rolf Aldag. The film is directed by Pepe Danquart who won an Academy Award for Live Action Short Film in 1993 for Black Rider (Schwarzfahrer).

In 2004, Mona Bräuer won a German Film Critics Award for Best Editing (Bester Schnitt).

Subsequent to the making of the documentary, several of the Telekom cyclists involved, including Zabel and Aldag, either confessed to illegal doping to enhance performance or were caught doing so, which drew more interest to the film.

== See also ==
- List of films about bicycles and cycling
