= Romāns Vainšteins =

Latvian cyclist

Personal information
- Full name: Romāns Vainšteins
- Born: 3 March 1973 (age 53) Talsi, Latvian SSR

Cycling career
- Sport: Cycling
- Discipline: Road
- Role: Rider

Professional teams
- 1997: Team Polti
- 1998: Kross–Selle Italia
- 1999–2000: Vini Caldirola
- 2001–2002: Domo–Farm Frites–Latexco
- 2003: Vini Caldirola–So.di
- 2004: Lampre

Major wins
- Grand Tours Giro d'Italia 1 individual stage (1999) Stage races Settimana Internazionale di Coppi e Bartali (1999) One-day races and Classics World Road Race Championships (2000) National Road Race Championships (1999) GP Industria & Artigianato di Larciano (1998) Paris–Brussels (1999) Grand Prix of Aargau Canton (1999) Coppa Bernocchi (2000)
Medal record
Representing Latvia
Men's road bicycle racing
World Championships
Gold medal – first place	2000 Plouay	Road race

Romāns Vainšteins (born 3 March 1973) is a former professional road bicycle racer from Latvia. He won the road race at the 2000 World Cycling Championship.

== Career ==
He won the road race at the 2000 World Cycling Championship in Plouay, France. At the end of the 268.8 km (167.0 mi) race, he won the sprint for the line ahead of Zbigniew Spruch and defending champion Óscar Freire.

Following his world title, Vainšteins moved to the Domo–Farm Frites–Latexco team under Patrick Lefevere. Even with some impressive results, such as third place in the 2001 Paris–Roubaix, he was unable to follow up on the success of his world championship. He left the team after the 2002 season and raced with Vini Caldirola and Lampre for two more years before retiring.

In 2017, Vainsteins returned to Latvia to work as the coach of the Latvian national cycling team after his unanimously appointment as head coach of the men’s national team. He also helped with coaching the under-23, junior, youth, and women’s teams.

== Controversy ==
In March 2025, Vainšteins was arrested at Orio al Serio airport in Bergamo, Italy, after landing on a flight from Riga, after his ex-wife, a former Italian resident, filed a case against him over non-payment of his child support obligation. Some reports suggested that the figure he owes was close €70,000. The couple had divorced in 2001. In 2018, he was sentenced to a four-month prison sentence and a €300 euro fine, and a warrant was issued for his arrest over non-payment, but he did not serve the sentence.

== Major results ==
1995
1st Circuit Franco-Belge
1996
3rd Memorial Van Coningsloo
1998
1st GP Industria & Artigianato di Larciano
1st Grand Prix Aarhus
3rd Road race, National Road Championships
1999
1st Road race, National Road Championships
1st Overall Settimana internazionale di Coppi e Bartali
1st Paris–Brussels
1st Grand Prix of Aargau Canton
1st Stage 6 Giro d'Italia
Tirreno–Adriatico

1st Stages 1 & 6

1st Gran Premio di Chiasso
2nd Giro del Lago Maggiore
3rd HEW Cyclassics
3rd Coppa Bernocchi
4th Trofeo Melinda
5th Gent–Wevelgem
2000
1st Road race, UCI Road World Championships
1st Coppa Bernocchi
2nd Overall Rheinland-Pfalz Rundfahrt

1st Stages 1 & 2

2nd Overall Three Days of De Panne
2nd Gran Premio Bruno Beghelli
3rd Tour of Flanders
3rd Clásica de San Sebastián
3rd Classic Haribo
4th Amstel Gold Race
4th Kuurne–Brussels–Kuurne
5th Omloop Het Volk
5th Grand Prix of Aargau Canton
6th Overall Ronde van Nederland
9th Milan–San Remo
10th Overall Tirreno–Adriatico

1st Stage 8

10th HEW Cyclassics
10th Züri–Metzgete
2001
1st Stage 3 Volta a Catalunya
1st Stage 6 Tirreno–Adriatico
2nd HEW Cyclassics
3rd Overall UCI Road World Cup
3rd Milan–San Remo
3rd Paris–Roubaix
2002
3rd Time trial, National Road Championships
5th Paris–Tours
2003
1st Stage 4 Giro Della Provincia Di Lucca
2004
5th Grand Prix de Fourmies
7th Milan–San Remo

=== Grand Tour results ===
Grand Tour	1999	2000	2001	2002	2003
Giro d'Italia	DNF	—	—	—	—
Tour de France	—	93	132	—	116
Vuelta a España	—	—	—	—	—

=== Classics results timeline ===
Monument	1999	2000	2001	2002	2003	2004
Milan–San Remo	41	9	3	—	73	7
Tour of Flanders	25	3	10	—	18	31
Paris–Roubaix	—	14	3	—	6	11
Liège–Bastogne–Liège	—	—	—	—	50	DNF
Giro di Lombardia	—	33	DNF	DNF	DNF	—
Classic	1999	2000	2001	2002	2003	2004
Gent–Wevelgem	5	—	13	—	—	DNF
Brabantse Pijl	Did not contest during his career					
Amstel Gold Race	16	4	DNF	—	28	54
La Flèche Wallonne	—	—	—	—	55	DNF
Clásica de San Sebastián	—	3	—	118	87	—
HEW Cyclassics	3	10	2	10	DNF	—
Paris–Tours	33	68	6	5	—	—
	1999	2000	2001	2002	2003	2004
UCI Road World Championships	29	1	DNF	32	DNF	60

Legend
—	Did not compete
DNF	Did not finish

== See also ==
- List of Jews in cycling
