= 2001 HEW Cyclassics =

Race details
- Dates: 19 August 2001
- Stages: 1
- Distance: 250.8 km (155.8 mi)
- Winning time: 5h 59' 02"

Results
| | Winner | Erik Zabel (GER) |
| | Second | Romāns Vainšteins (LAT) |
| | Third | Erik Dekker (NED) |

The 2001 HEW Cyclassics was the sixth edition of the HEW Cyclassics cycle race and was held on 19 August 2001. The race started and finished in Hamburg. The race was won by Erik Zabel.

== General classification ==
Final general classification

| | Cyclist | Team | Time |
|---|---|---|---|
| 1 | Erik Zabel (GER) | Team Telekom | 5h 59' 02" |
| 2 | Romāns Vainšteins (LAT) | Domo–Farm Frites–Latexco | s.t. |
| 3 | Erik Dekker (NED) | Rabobank | s.t. |
| 4 | Fabrizio Guidi (ITA) | Mercury–Viatel | s.t. |
| 5 | Andrej Hauptman (SLO) | Tacconi Sport–Vini Caldirola | s.t. |
| 6 | Paolo Bettini (ITA) | Mapei–Quick-Step | s.t. |
| 7 | Igor Astarloa (ESP) | Mercatone Uno–Stream TV | s.t. |
| 8 | Fabio Baldato (ITA) | Fassa Bortolo | s.t. |
| 9 | Werner Riebenbauer (AUT) | Team Nürnberger | s.t. |
| 10 | Sven Teutenberg (GER) | Festina | s.t. |
