= 1995 Tour de Pologne =

Cycling race

Race details
- Dates: 3–10 September 1995
- Stages: 9
- Distance: 1,235.8 km (767.9 mi)
- Winning time: 29h 45' 48"

Results
	Winner	Zbigniew Spruch (POL)
	Second	Fabrizio Guidi (ITA)
	Third	Dariusz Baranowski (POL)

The 1995 Tour de Pologne was the 52nd edition of the Tour de Pologne cycle race and was held from 3 September to 10 September 1995. The race started in Zgierz and finished in Warsaw. The race was won by Zbigniew Spruch.

== General classification ==
Final general classification

Rank	Rider	Time
1	Zbigniew Spruch (POL)	29h 45' 48"
2	Fabrizio Guidi (ITA)	+ 55"
3	Dariusz Baranowski (POL)	+ 2' 02"
4	Marek Leśniewski (POL)	+ 3' 49"
5	Tomasz Brożyna (POL)	+ 4' 25"
6	Romāns Vainšteins (LAT)	+ 5' 26"
7	Grzegorz Gwiazdowski (POL)	+ 5' 29"
8	Andrzej Sypytkowski (POL)	+ 5' 36"
9	Jacek Bodyk (POL)	+ 5' 44"
10	Eddy Gragus (USA)	+ 5' 45"
