= 1999 Scheldeprijs =

Race details
- Dates: 21 April 1999
- Stages: 1
- Distance: 201 km (124.9 mi)
- Winning time: 4h 35' 00"

Results
	Winner	Jeroen Blijlevens (NED)	(TVM–Farm Frites)
	Second	Erik Zabel (GER)	(Team Telekom)
	Third	Tristan Hoffman (NED)	(TVM–Farm Frites)

The 1999 Scheldeprijs was the 86th edition of the Scheldeprijs cycle race and was held on 21 April 1999. The race was won by Jeroen Blijlevens of the TVM team.

== General classification ==
Final general classification

Rank	Rider	Team	Time
1	Jeroen Blijlevens (NED)	TVM–Farm Frites	4h 35' 00"
2	Erik Zabel (GER)	Team Telekom	+ 0"
3	Tristan Hoffman (NED)	TVM–Farm Frites	+ 0"
4	Ralf Grabsch (GER)	Team Telekom	+ 0"
5	Jo Planckaert (BEL)	Lotto–Mobistar	+ 0"
6	Juris Silovs (LAT)	home–Jack & Jones	+ 0"
7	Michel Vanhaecke (BEL)	Tönissteiner–Colnago	+ 0"
8	Antonio Figura (ITA)	Liquigas	+ 0"
9	Zbigniew Spruch (POL)	Lampre–Daikin	+ 0"
10	Lars Michaelsen (DEN)	Française des Jeux	+ 0"
