= 1997 Scheldeprijs =

Race details
- Dates: 23 April 1997
- Stages: 1
- Distance: 202 km (125.5 mi)
- Winning time: 4h 30' 00"

Results
	Winner	Erik Zabel (GER)	(Team Telekom)
	Second	Johan Museeuw (BEL)	(Mapei–GB)
	Third	Andrei Tchmil (UKR)	(Lotto–Mobistar–Isoglass)

The 1997 Scheldeprijs was the 84th edition of the Scheldeprijs cycle race and was held on 23 April 1997. The race was won by Erik Zabel of the Telekom team.

== General classification ==
Final general classification

Rank	Rider	Team	Time
1	Erik Zabel (GER)	Team Telekom	4h 30' 00"
2	Johan Museeuw (BEL)	Mapei–GB	+ 0"
3	Andrei Tchmil (UKR)	Lotto–Mobistar–Isoglass	+ 0"
4	Danny Daelman (BEL)	Palmans–Lystex	+ 0"
5	Jeroen Blijlevens (NED)	TVM–Farm Frites	+ 0"
6	Jaan Kirsipuu (EST)	Casino	+ 0"
7	Andreas Klier (GER)	Team Nürnberger	+ 0"
8	Aart Vierhouten (NED)	Rabobank	+ 0"
9	Mario Traversoni (ITA)	Mercatone Uno	+ 0"
10	Lars Michaelsen (DEN)	TVM–Farm Frites	+ 0"
