= 2008 Scheldeprijs =

Race details
- Dates: April 16, 2008
- Stages: 1
- Distance: 207 km (128.6 mi)
- Winning time: 4h 59' 15"

Results
	Winner	Mark Cavendish (GBR)	(Team High Road)
	Second	Tom Boonen (BEL)	(Quick-Step)
	Third	Robbie McEwen (AUS)	(Silence–Lotto)

The 2008 Scheldeprijs cycling race took place on April 16, 2008. It was the 96th running of the Scheldeprijs. It was won by Mark Cavendish, who repeated his 2007 win. It was a surprise win as Tom Boonen celebrated too early and Cavendish was able to overtake at the last second.

== Results ==
	Cyclist	Team	Time
1	Mark Cavendish (GBR)	Team High Road	4h 59' 15"
2	Tom Boonen (BEL)	Quick-Step	s.t.
3	Robbie McEwen (AUS)	Silence–Lotto	s.t.
4	Erik Zabel (GER)	Team Milram	s.t.
5	Stefan van Dijk (BEL)	Mitsubishi–Jartazi	s.t.
6	Fabien Bacquet (BEL)	Skil–Shimano	s.t.
7	Gregory Henderson (NZL)	Team High Road	s.t.
8	Wouter Weylandt (BEL)	Quick-Step	s.t.
9	Daniel Musiol (BEL)	Team Volksbank	s.t.
10	Borut Božič (SLO)	Cycle Collstrop	s.t.
