= 2007 Scheldeprijs =

Race details
- Dates: April 18, 2007
- Stages: 1
- Distance: 197 km (122.4 mi)
- Winning time: 4h 09' 00"

Results
	Winner	Mark Cavendish (GBR)	(T-Mobile Team)
	Second	Robbie McEwen (AUS)	(Predictor–Lotto)
	Third	Gert Steegmans (BEL)	(Quick-Step–Innergetic)

The 2007 Scheldeprijs cycling race took place on April 18, 2007.

In the 95th running of the Scheldeprijs. Mark Cavendish beat Robbie McEwen and Gert Steegmans in a bunch sprint to take his first professional win.

== Results ==
	Cyclist	Team	Time
1	Mark Cavendish (GBR)	T-Mobile Team	4h 09' 00"
2	Robbie McEwen (AUS)	Predictor–Lotto	s.t.
3	Gert Steegmans (BEL)	Quick-Step–Innergetic	s.t.
4	Wouter Weylandt (BEL)	Quick-Step–Innergetic	s.t.
5	Graeme Brown (AUS)	Rabobank	s.t.
6	Claudio Cucinotta (ITA)	Tenax-Menikini	s.t.
7	Erik Zabel (GER)	Team Milram	s.t.
8	Baden Cooke (AUS)	Unibet.com	s.t.
9	Daniel Musiol (GER)	Wiesenhof–Felt	s.t.
10	Steven Caethoven (BEL)	Chocolade Jacques–Topsport Vlaanderen	s.t.
