= 1995 Gent–Wevelgem =

Race details
- Dates: 5 April 1995
- Stages: 1
- Distance: 207 km (129 mi)
- Winning time: 4h 56' 00"

Results
	Winner	Lars Michaelsen (DEN)	(Festina–Lotus)
	Second	Maurizio Fondriest (ITA)	(Lampre–Panaria)
	Third	Luc Roosen (BEL)	(Vlaanderen 2002–Eddy Merckx)

The 1995 Gent–Wevelgem was the 57th edition of the Belgian Gent–Wevelgem cycle race and was held on 5 April 1995. The race started in Ghent and finished in Wevelgem. The race was won by Lars Michaelsen of the Festina team.

== General classification ==
Final general classification

Rank	Rider	Team	Time
1	Lars Michaelsen (DEN)	Festina–Lotus	4h 56' 00"
2	Maurizio Fondriest (ITA)	Lampre–Panaria	+ 0"
3	Luc Roosen (BEL)	Vlaanderen 2002–Eddy Merckx	+ 9"
4	Mario Cipollini (ITA)	Mercatone Uno–Saeco	+ 17"
5	Giovanni Lombardi (ITA)	Polti–Granarolo–Santini	+ 17"
6	Zbigniew Spruch (POL)	Lampre–Panaria	+ 17"
7	Wilfried Nelissen (BEL)	Lotto–Isoglass	+ 17"
8	Erik Zabel (GER)	Team Telekom	+ 17"
9	Stefano Zanatta (ITA)	Aki–Gipiemme	+ 17"
10	Marco Serpellini (ITA)	Lampre–Panaria	+ 17"
