= Markus Schleicher =

German cyclist

Personal information
- Born: 6 August 1967 (age 59) Fulda, Germany

Cycling career
- Sport: Cycling
- Discipline: Road
- Role: Rider

Professional teams
- 1990–1992: Stuttgart–Mercedes–Merckx–Puma
- 1993: Varta–Elk-Basso–No

Markus Schleicher (born 6 August 1967) is a German former racing cyclist.

== Major results ==
1985
1st Road race, National Junior Road Championships
1989
1st Overall Mainfranken-Tour
1990
1st Stage 4 Tour of Ireland
6th GP Deutsche Weinstrasse
8th (TTT) GP de la Libération
10th Druivenkoers Overijse
1991
1st Circuit Escaut–Durme
8th Overall Tour of Sweden

Grand Tour	1990	1991	1992	1993
Giro d'Italia	–	–	145	–
Tour de France	Did not Race			
Vuelta a España	–	DNF	–	–
