= 1998 Tirreno–Adriatico =

Race details
- Dates: 11–18 March 1998
- Stages: 8
- Distance: 1,441 km (895 mi)
- Winning time: 38h 27' 30"

Results
| Jersey awarded to the overall winner | Winner | Rolf Järmann (SUI) | (Casino–Ag2r) |
| | Second | Franco Ballerini (ITA) | (Mapei–Bricobi) |
| | Third | Jens Heppner (GER) | (Team Telekom) |

The 1998 Tirreno–Adriatico was the 33rd edition of the Tirreno–Adriatico cycle race and was held from 11 March to 18 March 1998. The race started in Sorrento and finished in San Benedetto del Tronto. The race was won by Rolf Järmann of the Casino team.

== Teams ==
Twenty-three teams participated in the race:

- Saeco–Cannondale
- Mapei–Bricobi
- Festina–Lotus
- Team Telekom
- Rabobank
- Casino–Ag2r
- TVM–Farm Frites
- Française des Jeux
- Team Polti
- Cofidis
- Asics–CGA
- Vitalicio Seguros
- Mercatone Uno–Bianchi
- Cantina Tollo–Alexia Alluminio
- Ballan
- Scrigno–Gaerne
- Ros Mary–Amica Chips
- Brescialat–Liquigas
- Riso Scotti–MG Maglificio
- Kross–Selle Italia
- Vini Caldirola
- Amore & Vita–ForzArcore
- Mobilvetta Design–Northwave

== Route ==
Stage characteristics and winners
| Stage | Date | Course | Distance | Type | Winner |
|---|---|---|---|---|---|
| 1 | 11 March | Sorrento to Sorrento | 133 km (83 mi) | | Gabriele Balducci (ITA) |
| 2 | 12 March | Sorrento to Baia Domizia | 164 km (102 mi) | | Erik Zabel (GER) |
| 3 | 13 March | Sessa Aurunca to Venafro | 167 km (104 mi) | | Ján Svorada (CZE) |
| 4 | 14 March | Venafro to Tivoli | 208 km (129 mi) | | Gabriele Colombo (ITA) |
| 5 | 15 March | Tivoli to Torricella Sicura | 215 km (134 mi) | | Rolf Sørensen (DEN) |
| 6 | 16 March | Teramo to Frontone | 224 km (139 mi) | | Giovanni Lombardi (ITA) |
| 7 | 17 March | Civitanova Marche to Civitanova Marche | 164 km (102 mi) | | Erik Zabel (GER) |
| 8 | 17 March | Grottammare to San Benedetto del Tronto | 162 km (101 mi) | | Erik Zabel (GER) |

== General classification ==
Final general classification

| Rank | Rider | Team | Time |
|---|---|---|---|
| 1 | Rolf Järmann (SUI) | Casino–Ag2r | 38h 27' 30" |
| 2 | Franco Ballerini (ITA) | Mapei–Bricobi | + 4" |
| 3 | Jens Heppner (GER) | Team Telekom | + 1' 15" |
| 4 | Rolf Sørensen (DEN) | Rabobank | + 13' 15" |
| 5 | Zbigniew Spruch (POL) | Mapei–Bricobi | + 13' 20" |
| 6 | Germano Pierdomenico (ITA) | Cantina Tollo–Alexia Alluminio | + 13' 22" |
| 7 | Nicola Loda (ITA) | Ballan | + 13' 23" |
| 8 | Claudio Chiappucci (ITA) | Ros Mary–Amica Chips | + 13' 25" |
| 9 | Roberto Pistore (ITA) | Riso Scotti–MG Maglificio | + 13' 27" |
| 10 | Servais Knaven (NED) | TVM–Farm Frites | + 13' 27" |
