= 2000 Milan–San Remo =

Race details
- Dates: March 18, 2000
- Stages: 1
- Distance: 294 km (183 mi)
- Winning time: 7h 11' 29"

Results
	Winner	Erik Zabel (GER)	(Team Telekom)
	Second	Fabio Baldato (ITA)	(Fassa Bortolo)
	Third	Óscar Freire (ESP)	(Mapei–Quick-Step)

The 2000 Milan–San Remo was the 91st edition of the monument classic Milan–San Remo bicycle race and was won by Erik Zabel of Team Telekom. The race was run on March 18, 2000 and the 294 kilometres (183 mi) were covered in 7 hours, 11 minutes and 29 seconds.

== Results ==
	Cyclist	Team	Time
1	Erik Zabel (GER)	Team Telekom	7h 11' 29"
2	Fabio Baldato (ITA)	Fassa Bortolo	s.t.
3	Óscar Freire (ESP)	Mapei–Quick-Step	s.t.
4	Zbigniew Spruch (POL)	Lampre–Daikin	s.t.
5	Sergei Ivanov (RUS)	Farm Frites	s.t.
6	Jo Planckaert (BEL)	Cofidis	s.t.
7	Stefano Garzelli (ITA)	Mercatone Uno–Albacom	s.t.
8	Rolf Sørensen (DEN)	Rabobank	s.t.
9	Romāns Vainšteins (LAT)	Vini Caldirola–Sidermec	s.t.
10	Bo Hamburger (DEN)	Memory Card–Jack & Jones	s.t.
