= 2000 Amstel Gold Race =

The 2000 Amstel Gold Race was the 35th edition of the annual Amstel Gold Race road bicycle race, held on Sunday April 22, 2000 in the Dutch province of Limburg. The race stretched 257 kilometres, with the start and finish in Maastricht. There were a total of 191 competitors, with 106 cyclists finishing the race.

== Result ==
| | Cyclist | Team | Time |
|---|---|---|---|
| 1 | Erik Zabel (GER) | Team Telekom | 6h 13' 37" |
| 2 | Michael Boogerd (NED) | Rabobank | s.t. |
| 3 | Markus Zberg (SUI) | Rabobank | s.t. |
| 4 | Romāns Vainšteins (LAT) | Vini Caldirola | s.t. |
| 5 | Hendrik Van Dyck (BEL) | Palmans–Ideal | s.t. |
| 6 | Laurent Dufaux (SUI) | Saeco–Valli & Valli | s.t. |
| 7 | Peter Van Petegem (BEL) | Farm Frites | s.t. |
| 8 | Zbigniew Spruch (POL) | Lampre–Daikin | s.t. |
| 9 | Óscar Freire (ESP) | Mapei–Quick-Step | s.t. |
| 10 | Francesco Casagrande (ITA) | Vini Caldirola–Sidermec | s.t. |
