= 1994 Paris–Tours =

Race details
- Dates: 2 October 1994
- Stages: 1
- Distance: 250 km (155.3 mi)
- Winning time: 6h 15' 37"

Results
	Winner	Erik Zabel (GER)	(Team Telekom)
	Second	Gianluca Bortolami (ITA)	(Mapei–CLAS)
	Third	Zbigniew Spruch (POL)	(Lampre–Panaria)

The 1994 Paris–Tours was the 88th edition of the Paris–Tours cycle race and was held on 2 October 1994. The race started in Saint-Arnoult-en-Yvelines and finished in Tours. The race was won by Erik Zabel of the Telekom team.

== General classification ==
Final general classification

Rank	Rider	Team	Time
1	Erik Zabel (GER)	Team Telekom	6h 15' 37"
2	Gianluca Bortolami (ITA)	Mapei–CLAS	+ 0"
3	Zbigniew Spruch (POL)	Lampre–Panaria	+ 0"
4	Mario Cipollini (ITA)	Mercatone Uno–Medeghini	+ 0"
5	Adri van der Poel (NED)	Collstrop–Willy Naessens	+ 0"
6	Steve Bauer (CAN)	Motorola	+ 0"
7	Giovanni Fidanza (ITA)	Team Polti–Vaporetto	+ 0"
8	Laurent Jalabert (FRA)	ONCE	+ 0"
9	Wilfried Nelissen (BEL)	Novemail–Histor–Laser Computer	+ 0"
10	Martin van Steen (NED)	TVM–Bison Kit	+ 0"
