= 2001 Paris–Tours =

Race details
- Dates: 7 October 2001
- Stages: 1
- Distance: 254.5 km (158.1 mi)
- Winning time: 6h 58' 32"

Results
	Winner	Richard Virenque (FRA)	(Domo–Farm Frites–Latexco)
	Second	Óscar Freire (ESP)	(Mapei–Quick-Step)
	Third	Erik Zabel (GER)	(Team Telekom)

The 2001 Paris–Tours was the 95th edition of the Paris–Tours cycle race and was held on 7 October 2001. The race started in Saint-Arnoult-en-Yvelines and finished in Tours. The race was won by Richard Virenque of the Domo–Farm Frites team.

== General classification ==
Final general classification

Rank	Rider	Team	Time
1	Richard Virenque (FRA)	Domo–Farm Frites–Latexco	6h 58' 32"
2	Óscar Freire (ESP)	Mapei–Quick-Step	+ 2"
3	Erik Zabel (GER)	Team Telekom	+ 2"
4	Thor Hushovd (NOR)	Crédit Agricole	+ 2"
5	Andrej Hauptman (SLO)	Tacconi Sport–Vini Caldirola	+ 2"
6	Romāns Vainšteins (LAT)	Domo–Farm Frites–Latexco	+ 2"
7	Alessandro Petacchi (ITA)	Fassa Bortolo	+ 2"
8	Jaan Kirsipuu (EST)	AG2R Prévoyance	+ 2"
9	Niko Eeckhout (BEL)	Lotto–Adecco	+ 2"
10	Zbigniew Spruch (POL)	Lampre–Daikin	+ 2"
