= 1999 Tour Down Under =

1st edition of the Tour Down Under stage race

Race details
- Dates: 19–24 January 1999
- Stages: 6
- Distance: 762 km (473 mi)
- Winning time: 19h 03' 47"

Results
Jersey awarded to the overall winner	Winner	Stuart O'Grady (AUS)	(Crédit Agricole)
	Second	Jesper Skibby (DEN)	(home–Jack & Jones)
	Third	Magnus Bäckstedt (SWE)	(Crédit Agricole)
Jersey awarded to the points classification winner	Points	Brett Aitken (AUS)	(Palmans–Ideal)
Jersey awarded to the mountains classification winner	Mountains	Christian Andersen (DEN)	(home–Jack & Jones)
Jersey awarded to the young rider classification winner	Young rider	Cadel Evans (AUS)	(Australian Institute of Sports)
	Team	AG2R Prévoyance	

The 1999 Tour Down Under (known as the Jacobs Creek Tour Down Under for sponsorship reasons) was the first edition of the Tour Down Under stage race. It took place from 19 to 24 January in and around Adelaide, South Australia. The race was a UCI 2.4-class race and featured teams from Australia and around the world. The race was won by Australian rider Stuart O'Grady, who rode for Crédit Agricole.

== Background ==
In 1993, it was announced that the Formula One Australian Grand Prix would move from Adelaide, South Australia, to Melbourne, Victoria, from the 1996 season. Following the loss of this major sporting event, the Government of South Australia worked to organise other major sporting events to replace the Grand Prix, including the Adelaide 500 and the Tour Down Under.

In 1999, the Tour Down Under was established as the Jacobs Creek Tour Down Under. The original event concept was developed by a team led by 1984 Olympics 4000m team pursuit gold medallist Michael Turtur in conjunction with the Government of South Australia.

== Participating teams ==
Arfil
Australian Institute of Sports
Sun-Smart World Team
Palmans–Ideal
Team Telekom
home–Jack & Jones
BigMat–Auber 93
Casino–Ag2r Prévoyance
Crédit Agricole
Lampre–Daikin
Saeco–Cannondale
ONCE–Deutsche Bank

== Final classification ==
Result
Rank	Rider	Team	Time
1	Stuart O'Grady (AUS)	Crédit Agricole	19h 03' 47"
2	Jesper Skibby (DEN)	home–Jack & Jones	+ 21"
3	Magnus Bäckstedt (SWE)	Crédit Agricole	+ 35"
4	Duncan Smith (AUS)	Australian Institute of Sports	+ 1' 03"
5	Christian Andersen (DEN)	home–Jack & Jones	+ 2' 10"
6	Nicolaj Bo Larsen (DEN)	home–Jack & Jones	+ 2' 10"
7	Jean-Marc Riviere (FRA)	Sun-Smart World Team	+ 2' 16"
8	Alexander Vinokourov (KAZ)	Casino–Ag2r Prévoyance	+ 2' 17"
9	Massimiliano Mori (ITA)	Saeco–Cannondale	+ 2' 18"
10	Rolf Aldag (GER)	Team Telekom	+ 2' 18"
