= 1993 Tirreno–Adriatico =

Race details
- Dates: 10–17 March 1993
- Stages: 8
- Distance: 1,431 km (889.2 mi)
- Winning time: 38h 29' 36"

Results
	Winner	Maurizio Fondriest (ITA)	(Lampre–Polti)
	Second	Andrei Tchmil (MDA)	(GB–MG Maglificio)
	Third	Stefano Della Santa (ITA)	(Mapei–Viner)

The 1993 Tirreno–Adriatico was the 28th edition of the Tirreno–Adriatico cycle race and was held from 10 March to 17 March 1993. The race started in Ostia and finished in San Benedetto del Tronto. The race was won by Maurizio Fondriest of the Lampre team.

== General classification ==
Final general classification

Rank	Rider	Team	Time
1	Maurizio Fondriest (ITA)	Lampre–Polti	38h 29' 36"
2	Andrei Tchmil (MDA)	GB–MG Maglificio	+ 9"
3	Stefano Della Santa (ITA)	Mapei–Viner	+ 10"
4	Andrea Chiurato (ITA)	Gatorade–Mega Drive–Kenwood	+ 11"
5	Davide Rebellin (ITA)	GB–MG Maglificio	+ 12"
6	Alberto Elli (ITA)	Ariostea	+ 15"
7	Erik Zabel (GER)	Team Telekom	+ 16"
8	Alberto Volpi (ITA)	Mecair–Ballan	+ 17"
9	Udo Bölts (GER)	Team Telekom	+ 17"
10	Alexandr Shefer (KAZ)	Navigare–Blue Storm	+ 17"
