= 2003 Paris–Tours =

Race details
- Dates: 5 October 2003
- Stages: 1
- Distance: 257 km (159.7 mi)
- Winning time: 5h 24' 55"

Results
	Winner	Erik Zabel (GER)	(Team Telekom)
	Second	Alessandro Petacchi (ITA)	(Fassa Bortolo)
	Third	Stuart O'Grady (AUS)	(Crédit Agricole)

The 2003 Paris–Tours was the 97th edition of the Paris–Tours cycle race and was held on 5 October 2003. The race started in Saint-Arnoult-en-Yvelines and finished in Tours. The race was won by Erik Zabel of the Telekom team.

== General classification ==
Final general classification

Rank	Rider	Team	Time
1	Erik Zabel (GER)	Team Telekom	5h 24' 55"
2	Alessandro Petacchi (ITA)	Fassa Bortolo	+ 0"
3	Stuart O'Grady (AUS)	Crédit Agricole	+ 0"
4	Baden Cooke (AUS)	FDJeux.com	+ 0"
5	Franck Rénier (FRA)	Brioches La Boulangère	+ 0"
6	Julian Dean (NZL)	Team CSC	+ 0"
7	Stefano Zanini (ITA)	Saeco	+ 0"
8	Luca Paolini (ITA)	Quick-Step–Davitamon	+ 0"
9	Fred Rodriguez (USA)	Vini Caldirola–So.di	+ 0"
10	Peter Van Petegem (BEL)	Lotto–Domo	+ 0"
