= 2005 Paris–Tours =

These are the results for the 2005 edition of the Paris–Tours cycling classic. Erik Zabel equalised the three-wins record of riders such as Guido Reybrouck.

== Final classification ==
=== 09-10-2005: St. Arnould en Yvelines–Tours, 254 km. ===
RANK	CYCLIST	TEAM	TIME
1	Erik Zabel (GER)	T-Mobile Team	5h 37' 23
2	Daniele Bennati (ITA)	Lampre–Caffita	s.t.
3	Allan Davis (AUS)	Liberty Seguros–Würth	s.t.
4	Robbie McEwen (AUS)	Davitamon–Lotto	s.t.
5	Alberto Ongarato (ITA)	Fassa Bortolo	s.t.
6	Aurélien Clerc (FRA)	Phonak	s.t.
7	Julian Dean (NZL)	Crédit Agricole	s.t.
8	René Haselbacher (AUT)	Gerolsteiner	s.t.
9	Uroš Murn (SLO)	Phonak	s.t.
10	Enrico Gasparotto (ITA)	Liquigas–Bianchi	s.t.
