= 2002 Tour de Suisse =

Race details
- Dates: 18–27 June 2002
- Stages: 9 + Prologue
- Distance: 1,451 km (901.6 mi)
- Winning time: 37h 15' 09"

Results
	Winner	Alex Zülle (SUI)	(Team Coast)
	Second	Piotr Wadecki (POL)	(Domo–Farm Frites)
	Third	Nicolas Fritsch (FRA)	(Française des Jeux)

The 2002 Tour de Suisse was the 66th edition of the Tour de Suisse cycle race and was held from 18 June to 27 June 2002. The race started in Lucerne and finished in Biel. The race was won by Alex Zülle of the Coast team.

== Teams ==
Seventeen teams of up to eight riders started the race:

- Fassa Bortolo
- Team Telekom
- Rabobank
- Mapei–Quick-Step
- Domo–Farm Frites
- Lampre–Daikin
- Tacconi Sport
- Saeco–Longoni Sport
- Team Coast
- Alessio
- AG2R Prévoyance
- Acqua & Sapone–Cantina Tollo
- Française des Jeux
- Gerolsteiner
- Phonak
- Index–Alexia Alluminio
- Saint-Quentin–Oktos

== Route ==
Stage characteristics and winners
Stage	Date	Course	Distance	Type	Winner
P	18 June	Lucerne	5.7 km (3.5 mi)	Individual time trial	Alex Zülle (SUI)
1	19 June	Lucerne to Schaffhausen	171.9 km (106.8 mi)		Eddy Lembo (FRA)
2	20 June	Schaffhausen to Domat/Ems	191 km (118.7 mi)		Erik Zabel (GER)
3	21 June	Domat/Ems to Samnaun	158 km (98.2 mi)		Alexander Vinokourov (KAZ)
4	22 June	Chur to Ambrì	160 km (99.4 mi)		Léon van Bon (NED)
5	23 June	Meiringen to Meiringen	148 km (92.0 mi)		Francesco Casagrande (ITA)
6	24 June	Interlaken to Verbier	177 km (110 mi)		Alexandre Moos (SUI)
7	25 June	Martigny to Vevey	170.9 km (106.2 mi)		Juan Manuel Gárate (ESP)
8	26 June	Vevey to Lyss	228.9 km (142.2 mi)		Erik Zabel (GER)
9	27 June	Lyss to Biel	34.9 km (21.7 mi)	Individual time trial	Tobias Steinhauser (GER)

== General classification ==
Final general classification

Rank	Rider	Team	Time
1	Alex Zülle (SUI)	Team Coast	37h 15' 09"
2	Piotr Wadecki (POL)	Domo–Farm Frites	+ 1' 27"
3	Nicolas Fritsch (FRA)	Française des Jeux	+ 1' 38"
4	Laurent Dufaux (SUI)	Alessio	+ 2' 07"
5	Georg Totschnig (AUT)	Gerolsteiner	+ 2' 26"
6	Pavel Tonkov (RUS)	Lampre–Daikin	+ 2' 53"
7	Peter Luttenberger (AUT)	Tacconi Sport	+ 3' 11"
8	Giuseppe Di Grande (ITA)	Index–Alexia Alluminio	+ 4' 06"
9	Francesco Casagrande (ITA)	Fassa Bortolo	+ 4' 17"
10	Tadej Valjavec (SLO)	Fassa Bortolo	+ 4' 19"
