= 2000 Tour of Flanders =

Race details
- Dates: 2 April 2000
- Stages: 1
- Distance: 269 km (167.1 mi)
- Winning time: 6h 48' 17"

Results
	Winner	Andrei Tchmil (BEL)	(Lotto–Adecco)
	Second	Dario Pieri (ITA)	(Saeco)
	Third	Romāns Vainšteins (LAT)	(Vini Caldirola)

The 84th running of the Tour of Flanders cycling race in Belgium was held on Sunday 2 April 2000. It was the second leg of the 2000 UCI Road World Cup. Naturalized Belgian Andrei Tchmil won the monument classic ahead of Dario Pieri and Romāns Vainšteins. The race started in Bruges and finished in Meerbeke (Ninove).

== Race summary ==
Several crashes marred the race. Jans Koerts broke his arm and was taken to hospital. Defending champion Peter Van Petegem attacked on Tenbosse, but to no effect. Johan Museeuw tried to go clear on the Muur van Geraardsbergen, but was caught by a large group before the top. After the Bosberg, 11 km from the finish, Andrei Tchmil attacked on a flat stretch and powered on to Meerbeke. Tchmil never had more than 20 seconds over a large chasing group, but won by four seconds over Dario Pieri, who broke clear from the group, and Romāns Vainšteins. At 37, Tchmil became the oldest winner ever of the Tour of Flanders.

== Climbs ==
There were 16 categorized climbs:

- Den Ast
- Achterberg
- Wolvenberg
- Molenberg
- Kluisberg
- Knokteberg
- Oude Kwaremont
- Paterberg
- Kortekeer
- Taaienberg
- Eikenberg
- Leberg
- Berendries
- Tenbosse
- Muur-Kapelmuur
- Bosberg

== Results ==
	Cyclist	Team	Time
1	Andrei Tchmil (BEL)	Lotto–Adecco	6h 48' 17"
2	Dario Pieri (ITA)	Saeco	+ 4"
3	Romāns Vainšteins (LAT)	Vini Caldirola	s.t.
4	Erik Zabel (GER)	Team Telekom	s.t.
5	Tristan Hoffman (NED)	Memory Card–Jack&Jones	s.t.
6	Fabio Sacchi (ITA)	Team Polti	s.t.
7	Léon van Bon (NED)	Rabobank	s.t.
8	Peter Van Petegem (BEL)	Farm Frites	s.t.
9	Zbigniew Spruch (POL)	Lampre–Daikin	s.t.
10	Markus Zberg (SUI)	Rabobank	s.t.
