= 2001 Milan–San Remo =

Race details
- Dates: March 24
- Stages: 1
- Distance: 287 km (178 mi)
- Winning time: 7h 23' 13"

Results
	Winner	Erik Zabel (GER)	(Team Telekom)
	Second	Mario Cipollini (ITA)	(Saeco)
	Third	Romāns Vainšteins (LAT)	(Domo–Farm Frites–Latexco)

The 2001 Milan–San Remo was the 92nd edition of the monument classic Milan–San Remo and was won by Erik Zabel of Team Telekom. The race was run on March 24, 2001, and the 287 kilometres (178 mi) were covered in 7 hours, 23 minutes and 13 seconds.

== Results ==
	Cyclist	Team	Time
1	Erik Zabel (GER)	Team Telekom	7h 23' 13"
2	Mario Cipollini (ITA)	Saeco	s.t.
3	Romāns Vainšteins (LAT)	Domo–Farm Frites–Latexco	s.t.
4	Biagio Conte (ITA)	Saeco	s.t.
5	Paolo Bettini (ITA)	Mapei–Quick-Step	s.t.
6	Gabriele Colombo (ITA)	Cantina Tollo–Acqua & Sapone	s.t.
7	Gabriele Balducci (ITA)	Tacconi Sport–Vini Caldirola	s.t.
8	Markus Zberg (SWI)	Rabobank	s.t.
9	George Hincapie (USA)	U.S. Postal Service	s.t.
10	Rolf Sørensen (DEN)	CSC–Tiscali	s.t.
