= 1996 Vuelta a Andalucía =

Race details
- Dates: 19–23 February 1996
- Stages: 5
- Distance: 864.6 km (537.2 mi)
- Winning time: 22h 52' 53"

Results
	Winner	Neil Stephens (AUS)
	Second	Alexander Gontchenkov (RUS)
	Third	Peter Farazijn (BEL)

The 1996 Vuelta a Andalucía was the 42nd edition of the Vuelta a Andalucía cycle race and was held on 19 February to 23 February 1996. The race started in Seville and finished in Granada. The race was won by Neil Stephens.

== General classification ==
Final general classification

Rank	Rider	Time
1	Neil Stephens (AUS)	22h 52' 53"
2	Alexander Gontchenkov (RUS)	+ 32"
3	Peter Farazijn (BEL)	+ 2' 08"
4	Rafael Ruiz Erencia (ESP)	+ 2' 57"
5	Olaf Ludwig (GER)	+ 3' 46"
6	Koos Moerenhout (NED)	+ 4' 04"
7	Danny Nelissen (NED)	+ 4' 04"
8	Paolo Ferreira (POR)	+ 4' 12"
9	Antonio Miguel Diaz (ESP)	+ 11' 08"
10	Maarten den Bakker (NED)	+ 29' 40"
