= 1999 Gent–Wevelgem =

Race details
- Dates: 7 April 1999
- Stages: 1
- Distance: 208 km (129 mi)
- Winning time: 5h 15' 53"

Results
	Winner	Tom Steels (BEL)	(Mapei–Quick-Step)
	Second	Zbigniew Spruch (POL)	(Lampre–Daikin)
	Third	Tristan Hoffman (NED)	(TVM–Farm Frites)

The 1999 Gent–Wevelgem was the 61st edition of the Belgian Gent–Wevelgem cycle race and was held on 7 April 1999. The race started in Ghent and finished in Wevelgem. The race was won by Tom Steels of the Mapei team.

== General classification ==
Final general classification

Rank	Rider	Team	Time
1	Tom Steels (BEL)	Mapei–Quick-Step	5h 15' 53"
2	Zbigniew Spruch (POL)	Lampre–Daikin	+ 0"
3	Tristan Hoffman (NED)	TVM–Farm Frites	+ 0"
4	George Hincapie (USA)	U.S. Postal Service	+ 0"
5	Romāns Vainšteins (LAT)	Vini Caldirola	+ 0"
6	Juris Silovs (LAT)	home–Jack & Jones	+ 0"
7	Andrei Tchmil (BEL)	Lotto–Mobistar	+ 0"
8	Ludo Dierckxsens (BEL)	Lampre–Daikin	+ 0"
9	Steffen Wesemann (GER)	Team Telekom	+ 0"
10	Léon van Bon (NED)	Rabobank	+ 0"
