= Rolf Aldag =

German cyclist

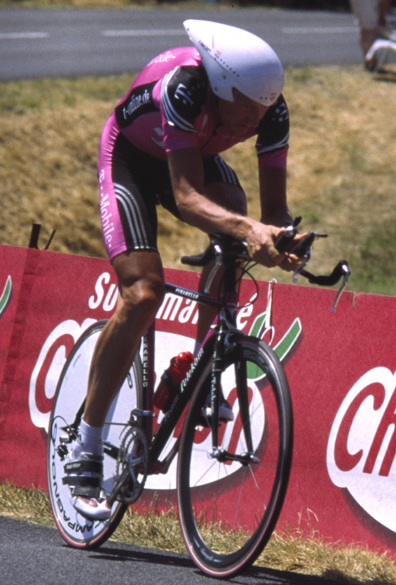
- Aldag, individual time trial Tour de France 2003

Personal information
- Full name: Rolf Aldag
- Born: 25 August 1968 (age 58) Beckum, West Germany
- Height: 1.91 m (6 ft 3 in)
- Weight: 75 kg (165 lb; 11 st 11 lb)

Cycling career
- Sport: Cycling
- Current team: Team Qhubeka NextHash
- Discipline: Road
- Role: Directeur sportif

Professional teams
- 1991–1992: Helvetia
- 1993–2005: Team Telekom

Managerial teams
- 2006–2011: T-Mobile Team
- 2014–Nov 2015: Omega Pharma–Quick-Step
- Nov 2015–2019: MTN–Qhubeka
- 2020–: Canyon–SRAM

Major wins
- (Germany) National Champion (2000)

Rolf Aldag (born 25 August 1968) is a German former professional road bicycle racer who rode for Team Telekom from 1993 to 2005. He raced in 10 Tour de France, 1 Giro d'Italia and 5 Vuelta a España. Prior to joining Telekom, he raced with Helvetia. Beginning in 2020, Aldag works as directeur sportif for the Canyon–SRAM team. In 2007 Aldag admitted to doping by having used Erythropoietin (EPO) from 1995 to 1999.

== Career ==
His career highlights include third stage place in both the 1994 and 1995 Tour de France, a stage win in the Tour de Limousin in 1996, a stage win in the Tour de Suisse 1997, overall win of the Bayern-Rundfahrt in 1999, a stage win in the Deutschland Tour 1999, being the German road Champion in 2000, a stage win Deutschland Tour 2001, a stage win in the Bayern-Rundfahrt 2002, a 2nd stage place in the, winner of the Sparkassen-Giro Bochum in 2003, and winner of the Sparkassen Cup Unna in 2003.

Aldag featured in the film Hell on Wheels concerning the 2003 Tour de France.

In "retirement", Aldag set a goal of competing in Ironman triathlons. He finished the Hamburg marathon in April 2006 with a time of 2 hours 42 minutes. He went on to finish the 2006 Ironman Lanzarote triathlon in the Canary Islands in 50th place of 825 finishers with a total time of 10:22:14 (swim 1:23:18, bike 5:18:05, run 3:27:56).

T-Mobile hired Aldag as sporting director after sacking Rudy Pevenage who was named in the 2006 Operación Puerto doping case.

Aldag managed the team up the end of 2011 when HTC–Highroad folded due to lack of sponsorship. Following the team's demise, Aldag spent a year working for the World Triathlon Corporation before taking up a role as a technical link-man between Specialized Bicycle Components and Omega Pharma–Quick-Step in 2013. In 2014 he became the Belgian team's Sport and Development Manager. In November 2015 MTN–Qhubeka announced that Aldag had been appointed as the team's Performance Manager with immediate effect, linking up with 2016 signings Mark Cavendish, Mark Renshaw and Bernhard Eisel. On 3 September 2019, the now renamed team Team Dimension Data announced that Aldag would leave at the end of the season. On 9 December 2019, Canyon–SRAM announced Aldag as their new directeur sportif for the 2020 season.

== Doping confession ==
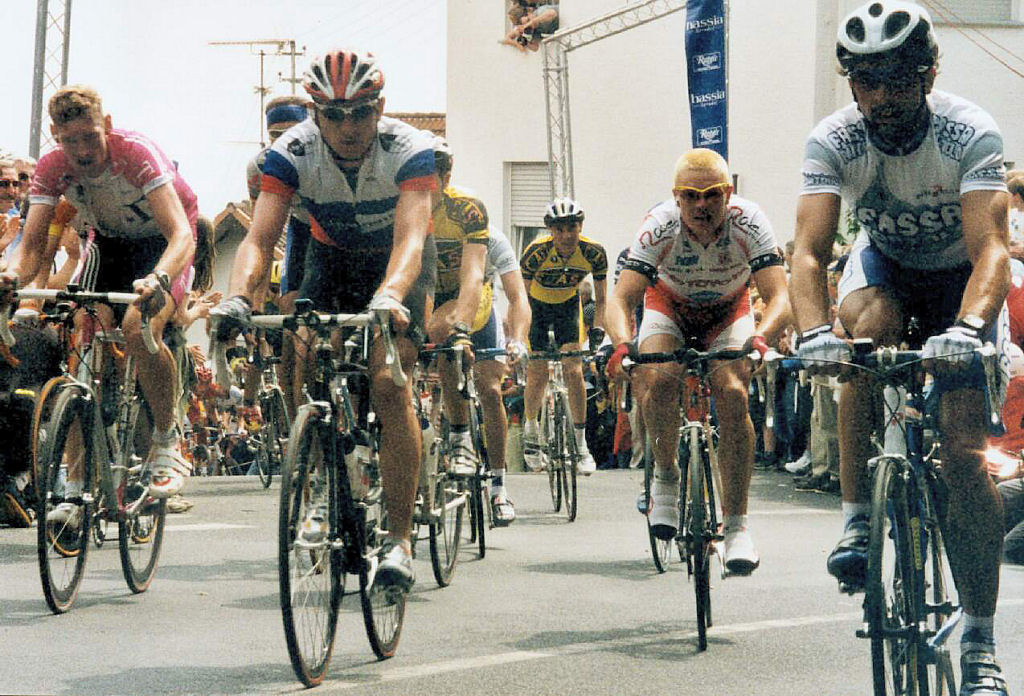
Aldag (left) at the 2000 Rund um den Henninger Turm

On 24 May 2007 Aldag together with former Team Telekom team mate and personal friend Erik Zabel admitted having used Erythropoietin (EPO) from 1995 to 1999. Aldag also publicly apologized for having lied about his use of EPO in the past.

His confession was triggered by accusations of former Team Telekom masseur Jef d'Hont from Belgium. In his book, of which excerpts where printed in the German political magazine Der Spiegel in April 2007, D'Hont accused members of Team Telekom of systematic and organized doping with EPO in the mid-1990s.

== See also ==
- List of doping cases in cycling
- List of sportspeople sanctioned for doping offences
