= 1997 Milan–San Remo =

Race details
- Dates: 22 March 1997
- Stages: 1
- Distance: 294 km (183 mi)
- Winning time: 6h 57' 47"

Results
	Winner	Erik Zabel (GER)	(Team Telekom)
	Second	Alberto Elli (ITA)	(Casino)
	Third	Biagio Conte (ITA)	(Scrigno–Gaerne)

The 88th running of the Milan–San Remo cycling classic was held on 22 March 1997 and won by German Erik Zabel.

== Summary ==
Michele Bartoli had a small lead on the top of the Poggio, before being joined by a small group with Johan Museeuw, Andrea Ferrigato and Marco Pantani. Rolf Sørensen led the pursuers, who rejoined the grupetto on the descent. A group of 40 decided the race in a sprint, for the first time in 17 years. Alberto Elli led the sprint from afar, but was overtaken by German sprint star Erik Zabel. Several riders were involved in a spectacular final-sprint crash, including Laurent Jalabert, Johan Museeuw and Maximilian Sciandri. Zabel was the second German winner of the Primavera after Rudi Altig in 1968 and the first winner in a mass sprint since Pierino Gavazzi in 1980.

== Results ==
Result
Rank	Rider	Team	Time
1	Erik Zabel (GER)	Team Telekom	6h 57' 47"
2	Alberto Elli (ITA)	Casino	s.t.
3	Biagio Conte (ITA)	Scrigno–Gaerne	s.t.
4	Francesco Casagrande (ITA)	Saeco–Estro	s.t.
5	Michele Bartoli (ITA)	MG Maglificio–Technogym	s.t.
6	Mirko Celestino (ITA)	Team Polti	s.t.
7	Serguei Outschakov (UKR)	Team Polti	s.t.
8	Rolf Sørensen (DEN)	Rabobank	s.t.
9	Andrea Ferrigato (ITA)	Roslotto–ZG Mobili	s.t.
10	Andrea Noè (ITA)	Asics–CGA	s.t.
