= 1998 Milan–San Remo =

Race details
- Dates: 21 March
- Stages: 1
- Distance: 294 km (183 mi)
- Winning time: 7h 10' 14"

Results
	Winner	Erik Zabel (GER)	(Team Telekom)
	Second	Emmanuel Magnien (FRA)	(Française des Jeux)
	Third	Frédéric Moncassin (FRA)	(GAN)

The 1998 Milan–San Remo was the 89th edition of the monument classic Milan–San Remo and was won by Erik Zabel of Team Telekom. The race was run on 21 March 1998, and the 294 kilometres (183 mi) were covered in 7 hours, 10 minutes and 14 seconds.

== Results ==
	Cyclist	Team	Time
1	Erik Zabel (GER)	Team Telekom	7h 10' 14"
2	Emmanuel Magnien (FRA)	Française des Jeux	s.t.
3	Frédéric Moncassin (FRA)	GAN	s.t.
4	Stefano Zanini (ITA)	Mapei–Bricobi	s.t.
5	Andrei Tchmil (BEL)	Lotto–Mobistar	s.t.
6	Filippo Casagrande (ITA)	Scrigno–Gaerne	s.t.
7	Peter van Petegem (BEL)	TVM–Farm Frites	s.t.
8	Michele Bartoli (ITA)	Asics–CGA	s.t.
9	Roberto Petito (ITA)	Saeco–Cannondale	s.t.
10	Alberto Elli (ITA)	Casino–Ag2r	s.t.
