= 1994 Gent–Wevelgem =

Race details
- Dates: 6 April 1994
- Stages: 1
- Distance: 210 km (130 mi)
- Winning time: 5h 08' 00"

Results
	Winner	Wilfried Peeters (BEL)	(GB–MG Maglificio)
	Second	Franco Ballerini (ITA)	(Mapei–CLAS)
	Third	Johan Museeuw (BEL)	(GB–MG Maglificio)

The 1994 Gent–Wevelgem was the 56th edition of the Belgian Gent–Wevelgem cycle race and was held on 6 April 1994. The race started in Ghent and finished in Wevelgem. The race was won by Wilfried Peeters of the GB–MG Maglificio team.

== General classification ==
Final general classification

Rank	Rider	Team	Time
1	Wilfried Peeters (BEL)	GB–MG Maglificio	5h 08' 00"
2	Franco Ballerini (ITA)	Mapei–CLAS	+ 0"
3	Johan Museeuw (BEL)	GB–MG Maglificio	+ 16"
4	Andrei Tchmil (MDA)	Lotto	+ 16"
5	Djamolidine Abdoujaparov (UZB)	Team Polti–Vaporetto	+ 16"
6	Zbigniew Spruch (POL)	Lampre–Panaria	+ 16"
7	Dimitri Konyshev (RUS)	Jolly Componibili–Cage	+ 16"
8	Max Sciandri (GBR)	GB–MG Maglificio	+ 16"
9	Fabio Roscioli (ITA)	Brescialat–Ceramiche Refin	+ 16"
10	Guy Nulens (BEL)	Novemail–Histor–Laser Computer	+ 16"
