= 1999 Milan–San Remo =

Race details
- Dates: March 20
- Stages: 1
- Distance: 294 km (183 mi)
- Winning time: 6h 52' 37"

Results
	Winner	Andrei Tchmil (BEL)	(Lotto–Mobistar)
	Second	Erik Zabel (GER)	(Team Telekom)
	Third	Zbigniew Spruch (POL)	(Lampre–Daikin)

The 1999 Milan–San Remo was the 90th edition of the monument classic Milan–San Remo and was won by Andrei Tchmil of Lotto–Mobistar. The race was run on March 20, 1999, and the 294 kilometres (183 mi) were covered in 6 hours, 52 minutes and 37 seconds.

== Results ==
	Cyclist	Team	Time
1	Andrei Tchmil (BEL)	Lotto–Mobistar	6h 52' 37"
2	Erik Zabel (GER)	Team Telekom	s.t.
3	Zbigniew Spruch (POL)	Lampre–Daikin	s.t.
4	Stefano Garzelli (ITA)	Mercatone Uno–Bianchi	s.t.
5	Lauri Aus (EST)	Casino–Ag2r Prévoyance	s.t.
6	Léon van Bon (NED)	Rabobank	s.t.
7	Peter Van Petegem (BEL)	TVM–Farm Frites	s.t.
8	Jo Planckaert (BEL)	Lotto–Mobistar	s.t.
9	George Hincapie (USA)	U.S. Postal Service	s.t.
10	Gabriele Balducci (ITA)	Navigare–Gaerne	s.t.
