= 1997 Tour de Suisse =

Race details
- Dates: 17–26 June 1997
- Stages: 9 + Prologue
- Distance: 1,520 km (944.5 mi)
- Winning time: 37h 48' 01"

Results
| | Winner | Christophe Agnolutto (FRA) | (Casino) |
| | Second | Oscar Camenzind (SUI) | (Mapei–GB) |
| | Third | Jan Ullrich (GER) | (Team Telekom) |

The 1997 Tour de Suisse was the 61st edition of the Tour de Suisse cycle race and was held from 17 June to 26 June 1997. The race started in Romanshorn and finished in Zürich. The race was won by Christophe Agnolutto of the Casino team.

== General classification ==
Final general classification

| Rank | Rider | Team | Time |
|---|---|---|---|
| 1 | Christophe Agnolutto (FRA) | Casino | 37h 48' 01" |
| 2 | Oscar Camenzind (SUI) | Mapei–GB | + 2' 08" |
| 3 | Jan Ullrich (GER) | Team Telekom | + 4' 20" |
| 4 | David Etxebarria (ESP) | ONCE | + 5' 32" |
| 5 | Roland Meier (SUI) | Post Swiss Team | + 6' 18" |
| 6 | Félix García Casas (ESP) | Festina–Lotus | + 6' 22" |
| 7 | Daniele Nardello (ITA) | Mapei–GB | + 6' 48" |
| 8 | Stefano Garzelli (ITA) | Mercatone Uno | + 7' 17" |
| 9 | Philipp Buschor (SUI) | Saeco–Estro | + 7' 26" |
| 10 | Beat Zberg (SUI) | Mercatone Uno | + 8' 31" |
