= 1996 UCI Road World Cup =

- Eighth edition of the UCI Road World Cup

Details
- Dates: 23 March – 27 October 1996
- Location: Europe and Japan
- Races: 11

Champions
- Individual champion: Johan Museeuw (BEL) (Mapei–GB)
- Teams' champion: Mapei–GB

The 1996 UCI Road World Cup was the eighth edition of the UCI Road World Cup. It was won by Belgian classics specialist Johan Museeuw of the Mapei–GB team.

== Races ==
Date	Race	Country	Winner	Team	World Cup Leader	Leader's Team	Report
23 March	Milan–San Remo	Italy	Gabriele Colombo (ITA)	Gewiss Playbus	Gabriele Colombo (ITA)	Gewiss Playbus	Report
7 April	Tour of Flanders	Belgium	Michele Bartoli (ITA)	MG Maglificio–Technogym	Michele Bartoli (ITA)	MG Maglificio–Technogym	Report
14 April	Paris–Roubaix	France	Johan Museeuw (BEL)	Mapei–GB	Johan Museeuw (BEL)	Mapei–GB	Report
21 April	Liège–Bastogne–Liège	Belgium	Pascal Richard (SUI)	MG Maglificio–Technogym	Johan Museeuw (BEL)	Mapei–GB	Report
27 April	Amstel Gold Race	Netherlands	Stefano Zanini (ITA)	Gewiss Playbus	Johan Museeuw (BEL)	Mapei–GB	Report
10 August	Clásica de San Sebastián	Spain	Udo Bölts (GER)	Team Telekom	Johan Museeuw (BEL)	Mapei–GB	Report
18 August	Leeds International Classic	United Kingdom	Andrea Ferrigato (ITA)	Roslotto–ZG Mobili	Johan Museeuw (BEL)	Mapei–GB	Report
25 August	Grand Prix de Suisse	Switzerland	Andrea Ferrigato (ITA)	Roslotto–ZG Mobili	Johan Museeuw (BEL)	Mapei–GB	Report
6 October	Paris–Tours	France	Nicola Minali (ITA)	Gewiss Playbus	Johan Museeuw (BEL)	Mapei–GB	Report
19 October	Giro di Lombardia	Italy	Andrea Tafi (ITA)	Mapei–GB	Johan Museeuw (BEL)	Mapei–GB	Report
27 October	Japan Cup	Japan	Mauro Gianetti (SUI)	Team Polti	Johan Museeuw (BEL)	Mapei–GB	Report

== Single races details ==
worldcupjersey	Denotes the Classification Leader

In the race results the leader jersey identify the rider who wore the jersey in the race (the leader at the start of the race).

In the general classification table the jersey identify the leader after the race.

23 March 1996 — Milan-Sanremo 294 km (182.7 mi)

	Rider	Team	Time
1	Gabriele Colombo (ITA)	Gewiss Playbus	7h 00' 27"
2	Alexander Gontchenkov (UKR)	Roslotto–ZG Mobili	+ 1"
3	Michele Coppolillo (ITA)	MG Maglificio–Technogym	s.t.
4	Max Sciandri (GBR)	Motorola	s.t.
5	Stefano Zanini (ITA)	Gewiss Playbus	+ 32"
6	Fabio Baldato (ITA)	MG Maglificio–Technogym	s.t.
7	Mario Cipollini (ITA)	Saeco–AS Juvenes San Marino	s.t.
8	Johan Museeuw (BEL)	Mapei–GB	s.t.
9	Laurent Brochard (FRA)	Festina–Lotus	s.t.
10	Andrei Tchmil (UKR)	Lotto	s.t.

General classification after Milan-Sanremo

	Rider	Team	Points
1	Gabriele Colombo (ITA)	Gewiss Playbus	50
2	Alexander Gontchenkov (UKR)	Roslotto–ZG Mobili	35
3	Michele Coppolillo (ITA)	MG Maglificio–Technogym	25
4	Max Sciandri (GBR)	Motorola	20
5	Stefano Zanini (ITA)	Gewiss Playbus	18
6	Fabio Baldato (ITA)	MG Maglificio–Technogym	16
7	Mario Cipollini (ITA)	Saeco–AS Juvenes San Marino	14
8	Johan Museeuw (BEL)	Mapei–GB	12
9	Laurent Brochard (FRA)	Festina–Lotus	10
10	Andrei Tchmil (UKR)	Lotto	8

7 April 1996 — Tour of Flanders 269 km (167.1 mi)

	Rider	Team	Time
1	Michele Bartoli (ITA)	MG Maglificio–Technogym	6h 27' 00"
2	Fabio Baldato (ITA)	MG Maglificio–Technogym	+ 55"
3	Johan Museeuw (BEL)	Mapei–GB	s.t.
4	Viatcheslav Ekimov (RUS)	Rabobank	s.t.
5	Fabiano Fontanelli (ITA)	MG Maglificio–Technogym	s.t.
6	Andrei Tchmil (UKR)	Lotto	s.t.
7	Laurent Brochard (FRA)	Festina–Lotus	s.t.
8	Alexander Gontchenkov (UKR)	Roslotto–ZG Mobili	s.t.
9	Rolf Sörensen (DEN)	Rabobank	s.t.
10	Peter Van Petegem (BEL)	TVM–Farm Frites	s.t.

General classification after Tour of Flanders

	Rider	Team	Points
1	Michele Bartoli (ITA)	MG Maglificio–Technogym	55
2	Fabio Baldato (ITA)	MG Maglificio–Technogym	51
3	Gabriele Colombo (ITA)	Gewiss Playbus	50
4	Alexander Gontchenkov (UKR)	Roslotto–ZG Mobili	47
5	Johan Museeuw (BEL)	Mapei–GB	37
6	Michele Coppolillo (ITA)	MG Maglificio–Technogym	25
7	Andrei Tchmil (UKR)	Lotto	24
8	Laurent Brochard (FRA)	Festina–Lotus	24
9	Viatcheslav Ekimov (RUS)	Rabobank	20
10	Max Sciandri (GBR)	Motorola	20

14 April 1996 — Paris-Roubaix 263.5 km (163.7 mi)

	Rider	Team	Time
1	Johan Museeuw (BEL)	Mapei–GB	6h 38' 10"
2	Gianluca Bortolami (ITA)	Mapei–GB	s.t.
3	Andrea Tafi (ITA)	Mapei–GB	s.t.
4	Stefano Zanini (ITA)	Gewiss Playbus	+ 2' 38"
5	Franco Ballerini (ITA)	Mapei–GB	s.t.
6	Andrei Tchmil (UKR)	Lotto	+ 5' 27"
7	Brian Holm (DEN)	Team Telekom	s.t.
8	Viatcheslav Ekimov (RUS)	Rabobank	s.t.
9	Francis Moreau (FRA)	GAN	s.t.
10	Marco Milesi (ITA)	Brescialat	s.t.

General classification after Paris-Roubaix

	Rider	Team	Points
1	Johan Museeuw (BEL)	Mapei–GB	87
2	Michele Bartoli (ITA)	MG Maglificio–Technogym	55
3	Fabio Baldato (ITA)	MG Maglificio–Technogym	51
4	Gabriele Colombo (ITA)	Gewiss Playbus	50
5	Alexander Gontchenkov (UKR)	Roslotto–ZG Mobili	47
6	Andrei Tchmil (UKR)	Lotto	40
7	Stefano Zanini (ITA)	Gewiss Playbus	38
8	Gianluca Bortolami (ITA)	Mapei–GB	35
9	Viatcheslav Ekimov (RUS)	Rabobank	32
10	Andrea Tafi (ITA)	Mapei–GB	25
10	Michele Coppolillo (ITA)	MG Maglificio–Technogym	25

21 April 1996 — Liège–Bastogne–Liège 263 km (163.4 mi)

	Rider	Team	Time
1	Pascal Richard (SUI)	MG Maglificio–Technogym	6h 58' 02"
2	Lance Armstrong (USA)	Motorola	s.t.
3	Mauro Gianetti (SUI)	Team Polti	s.t.
4	Laurent Madouas (FRA)	Motorola	+ 1' 06"
5	Fabiano Fontanelli (ITA)	MG Maglificio–Technogym	+ 1' 19"
6	Davide Rebellin (ITA)	Team Polti	+ 1' 22"
7	Axel Merckx (BEL)	Motorola	+ 1' 36"
8	Richard Virenque (FRA)	Festina–Lotus	+ 1' 52"
9	Rolf Sørensen (DEN)	Rabobank	s.t.
10	Gabriele Colombo (ITA)	Gewiss Playbus	+ 2' 01"

General classification after Liège–Bastogne–Liège

	Rider	Team	Points
1	Johan Museeuw (BEL)	Mapei–GB	87
2	Gabriele Colombo (ITA)	Gewiss Playbus	58
3	Michele Bartoli (ITA)	MG Maglificio–Technogym	55
4	Fabio Baldato (ITA)	MG Maglificio–Technogym	51
5	Pascal Richard (SUI)	MG Maglificio–Technogym	50
6	Alexander Gontchenkov (UKR)	Roslotto–ZG Mobili	47
7	Lance Armstrong (USA)	Motorola	41
8	Andrei Tchmil (UKR)	Lotto	40
9	Stefano Zanini (ITA)	Gewiss Playbus	38
10	Fabiano Fontanelli (ITA)	MG Maglificio–Technogym	36

27 April 1996 — Amstel Gold Race 253 km (157.2 mi)

	Rider	Team	Time
1	Stefano Zanini (ITA)	Gewiss Playbus	5h 55' 36"
2	Mauro Bettin (ITA)	Refin–Mobilvetta	+ 22"
3	Johan Museeuw (BEL)	Mapei–GB	s.t.
4	Alexander Gontchenkov (UKR)	Roslotto–ZG Mobili	s.t.
5	Fabiano Fontanelli (ITA)	MG Maglificio–Technogym	s.t.
6	Andrei Tchmil (UKR)	Lotto	s.t.
7	Emmanuel Magnien (FRA)	Festina–Lotus	s.t.
8	Gianluca Bortolami (ITA)	Mapei–GB	s.t.
9	Jens Heppner (GER)	Team Telekom	s.t.
10	Beat Zberg (SUI)	Carrera Jeans–Tassoni	s.t.

General classification after Amstel Gold Race

	Rider	Team	Points
1	Johan Museeuw (BEL)	Mapei–GB	112
2	Stefano Zanini (ITA)	Gewiss Playbus	88
3	Alexander Gontchenkov (UKR)	Roslotto–ZG Mobili	67
4	Gabriele Colombo (ITA)	Gewiss Playbus	58
5	Andrei Tchmil (UKR)	Lotto	56
6	Michele Bartoli (ITA)	MG Maglificio–Technogym	55
7	Fabiano Fontanelli (ITA)	MG Maglificio–Technogym	54
8	Fabio Baldato (ITA)	MG Maglificio–Technogym	51
9	Pascal Richard (SUI)	MG Maglificio–Technogym	50
10	Gianluca Bortolami (ITA)	Mapei–GB	47

10 August 1996 — Clásica de San Sebastián 234 km (145.4 mi)

	Rider	Team	Time
1	Udo Bölts (GER)	Team Telekom	5h 45' 55"
2	Stefano Cattai (ITA)	Roslotto–ZG Mobili	s.t.
3	Massimo Podenzana (ITA)	Carrera Jeans–Tassoni	s.t.
4	Richard Virenque (FRA)	Festina–Lotus	s.t.
5	Marco Fincato (ITA)	Roslotto–ZG Mobili	s.t.
6	Alberto Elli (ITA)	MG Maglificio–Technogym	s.t.
7	Fabio Baldato (ITA)	MG Maglificio–Technogym	+ 1' 01"
8	Andrea Ferrigato (ITA)	Roslotto–ZG Mobili	s.t.
9	Francesco Casagrande (ITA)	Saeco–AS Juvenes San Marino	s.t.
10	Laurent Jalabert (FRA)	ONCE	s.t.

General classification after Clásica de San Sebastián

	Rider	Team	Points
1	Johan Museeuw (BEL)	Mapei–GB	112
2	Stefano Zanini (ITA)	Gewiss Playbus	88
3	Alexander Gontchenkov (UKR)	Roslotto–ZG Mobili	67
4	Fabio Baldato (ITA)	MG Maglificio–Technogym	65
5	Gabriele Colombo (ITA)	Gewiss Playbus	58
6	Andrei Tchmil (UKR)	Lotto	56
7	Michele Bartoli (ITA)	MG Maglificio–Technogym	55
8	Fabiano Fontanelli (ITA)	MG Maglificio–Technogym	54
9	Udo Bölts (GER)	Team Telekom	50
10	Pascal Richard (SUI)	MG Maglificio–Technogym	50

18 August 1996 — Leeds International Classic 235 km (146.0 mi)

	Rider	Team	Time
1	Andrea Ferrigato (ITA)	Roslotto–ZG Mobili	5h 43' 13"
2	Max Sciandri (GBR)	Motorola	+ 1"
3	Johan Museeuw (BEL)	Mapei–GB	+ 20"
4	Lance Armstrong (USA)	Motorola	s.t.
5	Michele Bartoli (ITA)	MG Maglificio–Technogym	s.t.
6	Davide Rebellin (ITA)	Team Polti	s.t.
7	Marco Fincato (ITA)	Roslotto–ZG Mobili	s.t.
8	Andrea Tafi (ITA)	Mapei–GB	s.t.
9	Marco Milesi (ITA)	Brescialat	+ 1' 01"
10	Stefano Colagè (ITA)	Refin–Mobilvetta	+ 1' 09"

General classification after Leeds International Classic

	Rider	Team	Points
1	Johan Museeuw (BEL)	Mapei–GB	137
2	Stefano Zanini (ITA)	Gewiss Playbus	88
3	Michele Bartoli (ITA)	MG Maglificio–Technogym	73
4	Alexander Gontchenkov (UKR)	Roslotto–ZG Mobili	67
5	Fabio Baldato (ITA)	MG Maglificio–Technogym	65
6	Andrea Ferrigato (ITA)	Roslotto–ZG Mobili	62
7	Lance Armstrong (USA)	Motorola	61
8	Gabriele Colombo (ITA)	Gewiss Playbus	58
9	Andrei Tchmil (UKR)	Lotto	56
10	Fabiano Fontanelli (ITA)	MG Maglificio–Technogym	54

*Maximilan Sciandri had 10 points removed by penalty for not attending the final ceremony

25 August 1996 — Grand Prix de Suisse 232 km (144.2 mi)

	Rider	Team	Time
1	Andrea Ferrigato (ITA)	Roslotto–ZG Mobili	5h 51' 52"
2	Michele Bartoli (ITA)	MG Maglificio–Technogym	s.t.
3	Johan Museeuw (BEL)	Mapei–GB	s.t.
4	Lance Armstrong (USA)	Motorola	s.t.
5	Francesco Casagrande (ITA)	Saeco–AS Juvenes San Marino	s.t.
6	Alessandro Baronti (ITA)	Panaria–Vinavil	s.t.
7	Frank Vandenbroucke (BEL)	Mapei–GB	s.t.
8	Fabio Baldato (ITA)	MG Maglificio–Technogym	+ 11"
9	Maurizio Fondriest (ITA)	Roslotto–ZG Mobili	s.t.
10	Laurent Jalabert (FRA)	ONCE	s.t.

General classification after Grand Prix de Suisse

	Rider	Team	Points
1	Johan Museeuw (BEL)	Mapei–GB	162
2	Andrea Ferrigato (ITA)	Roslotto–ZG Mobili	112
3	Michele Bartoli (ITA)	MG Maglificio–Technogym	108
4	Stefano Zanini (ITA)	Gewiss Playbus	88
5	Lance Armstrong (USA)	Motorola	81
6	Fabio Baldato (ITA)	MG Maglificio–Technogym	77
7	Alexander Gontchenkov (UKR)	Roslotto–ZG Mobili	67
8	Gabriele Colombo (ITA)	Gewiss Playbus	58
9	Andrei Tchmil (UKR)	Lotto	56
10	Fabiano Fontanelli (ITA)	MG Maglificio–Technogym	54

6 October 1996 — Paris-Tours 253 km (157.2 mi)

	Rider	Team	Time
1	Nicola Minali (ITA)	Gewiss Playbus	5h 38' 55"
2	Tom Steels (BEL)	Mapei–GB	s.t.
3	Giovanni Lombardi (ITA)	Team Polti	s.t.
4	Tristan Hoffman (NED)	Mapei–GB	s.t.
5	Laurent Jalabert (FRA)	ONCE	s.t.
6	Michele Bartoli (ITA)	MG Maglificio–Technogym	s.t.
7	Andrea Ferrigato (ITA)	Roslotto–ZG Mobili	s.t.
8	Pascal Chanteur (FRA)	Petit Casino	s.t.
9	Giuseppe Citterio (ITA)	Aki–Gipiemme	s.t.
10	Lars Michaelsen (DEN)	Festina–Lotus	s.t.

General classification after Paris-Tours

	Rider	Team	Points
1	Johan Museeuw (BEL)	Mapei–GB	162
2	Andrea Ferrigato (ITA)	Roslotto–ZG Mobili	126
3	Michele Bartoli (ITA)	MG Maglificio–Technogym	124
4	Stefano Zanini (ITA)	Gewiss Playbus	88
5	Lance Armstrong (USA)	Motorola	81
6	Fabio Baldato (ITA)	MG Maglificio–Technogym	77
7	Alexander Gontchenkov (UKR)	Roslotto–ZG Mobili	67
8	Gabriele Colombo (ITA)	Gewiss Playbus	58
9	Andrei Tchmil (UKR)	Lotto	56
10	Fabiano Fontanelli (ITA)	MG Maglificio–Technogym	54

19 October 1996 — Giro di Lombardia 250 km (155.3 mi)

	Rider	Team	Time
1	Andrea Tafi (ITA)	Mapei–GB	5h 51' 46"
2	Fabian Jeker (SUI)	Festina–Lotus	+ 2' 19"
3	Axel Merckx (BEL)	Motorola	+ 2' 22"
4	Daniele Nardello (ITA)	Mapei–GB	+ 2' 29"
5	Davide Rebellin (ITA)	Team Polti	s.t.
6	Gianni Bugno (ITA)	MG Maglificio–Technogym	+ 3' 03"
7	Richard Virenque (FRA)	Festina–Lotus	s.t.
8	Mauro Gianetti (SUI)	Team Polti	s.t.
9	Laurent Jalabert (FRA)	ONCE	s.t.
10	Andrea Peron (ITA)	Motorola	s.t.

General classification after Giro di Lombardia

	Rider	Team	Points
1	Johan Museeuw (BEL)	Mapei–GB	162
2	Andrea Ferrigato (ITA)	Roslotto–ZG Mobili	126
3	Michele Bartoli (ITA)	MG Maglificio–Technogym	124
4	Stefano Zanini (ITA)	Gewiss Playbus	88
5	Andrea Tafi (ITA)	Mapei–GB	87
6	Lance Armstrong (USA)	Motorola	81
7	Fabio Baldato (ITA)	MG Maglificio–Technogym	77
8	Alexander Gontchenkov (UKR)	Roslotto–ZG Mobili	67
9	Gabriele Colombo (ITA)	Gewiss Playbus	58
10	Andrei Tchmil (UKR)	Lotto	56

27 October 1996 — Japan Cup 179.5 km (111.5 mi)

	Rider	Team	Time
1	Mauro Gianetti (SUI)	Team Polti	4h 31' 01"
2	Pascal Hervé (FRA)	Festina–Lotus	+ 23"
3	Andrea Peron (ITA)	Motorola	+ 24"
4	Andrea Tafi (ITA)	Mapei–GB	s.t.
5	Davide Rebellin (ITA)	Team Polti	s.t.
6	Daniele Nardello (ITA)	Mapei–GB	+ 32"
7	Fabio Roscioli (ITA)	Refin–Mobilvetta	+ 1' 57"
8	Viatcheslav Ekimov (RUS)	Rabobank	+ 4' 30"
9	Michel Lafis (SWE)	Team Telekom	s.t.
10	Bobby Julich (USA)	Motorola	+ 4' 42"

General classification after Japan Cup

	Rider	Team	Points
1	Johan Museeuw (BEL)	Mapei–GB	162
2	Andrea Ferrigato (ITA)	Roslotto–ZG Mobili	126
3	Michele Bartoli (ITA)	MG Maglificio–Technogym	124
4	Andrea Tafi (ITA)	Mapei–GB	107
5	Stefano Zanini (ITA)	Gewiss Playbus	88
6	Mauro Gianetti (SUI)	Team Polti	87
7	Lance Armstrong (USA)	Motorola	81
8	Fabio Baldato (ITA)	MG Maglificio–Technogym	77
9	Davide Rebellin (ITA)	Team Polti	68
10	Alexander Gontchenkov (UKR)	Roslotto–ZG Mobili	67

== Final standings ==
=== Individual ===
Points are awarded to the top 12 classified riders. Riders must start at least 6 races to be classified.

The points are awarded for every race using the following system:

Position	1st	2nd	3rd	4th	5th	6th	7th	8th	9th	10th	11th	12th
Points	50	35	25	20	18	16	14	12	10	8	6	5

Pos.	Rider	Team	MSR	ToF	ROU	LBL	AGR	CSS	LEE	SUI	TOU	LOM	JAP	Pts.
1	Johan Museeuw (BEL)	Mapei–GB	12	25	50	DNS	25	0	25	25	0	0	0	162
2	Andrea Ferrigato (ITA)	Roslotto–ZG Mobili	?	?	?	?	?	12	50	50	14	?	0	126
3	Michele Bartoli (ITA)	MG Maglificio–Technogym	5	50	DNS	0	0	0	18	35	16	0	?	124
4	Andrea Tafi (ITA)	Mapei–GB	0	0	25	?	?	?	12	0	0	50	20	107
5	Stefano Zanini (ITA)	Gewiss Playbus	18	0	20	0	50	DNS	DNS	?	0	0	0	88
6	Mauro Gianetti (SUI)	Team Polti	0	?	DNS	25	0	0	0	0	0	12	50	87
7	(United States) Lance Armstrong	Motorola	6	0	DNS	35	0	0	20	20	0	0	0	81
8	Fabio Baldato (ITA)	MG Maglificio–Technogym	16	35	0	?	?	14	0	12	0	?	?	77
9	Davide Rebellin (ITA)	Team Polti	0	?	?	16	0	0	16	0	?	18	18	68
10	Alexander Gontchenkov (UKR)	Roslotto–ZG Mobili	35	12	?	DNS	20	0	DNS	?	?	?	?	67
11	Gabriele Colombo (ITA)	Gewiss Playbus	50	0	DNS	8	?	DNS	?	?	?	?	?	58
12	Andrei Tchmil (UKR)	Lotto	8	16	16	?	16	0	0	0	0	?	?	56
13	Nicola Minali (ITA)	Gewiss Playbus	?	?	?	?	?	?	?	?	50	?	?	50
14	Udo Bölts (GER)	Team Telekom	?	?	?	0	0	50	?	0	0	?	?	50
15	Pascal Richard (SUI)	MG Maglificio–Technogym	?	?	?	50	?	DNS	?	?	0	?	?	50
16	Gianluca Bortolami (ITA)	Mapei–GB	0	0	35	0	12	?	?	?	?	?	?	47
17	Richard Virenque (FRA)	Festina–Lotus	0	?	?	12	0	20	?	0	0	14	?	46
18	Max Sciandri (GBR)	Motorola	20	0	DNS	?	0	0	35	0	0	?	?	45*
19	Viatcheslav Ekimov (RUS)	Rabobank	0	20	12	?	0	0	?	?	0	?	12	44
20	Laurent Jalabert (FRA)	ONCE	DNS	?	DNS	DNS	?	8	?	8	18	10	?	44

*Maximilan Sciandri had 10 points removed by penalty

Fabiano Fontanelli gained 54 points but was out of top 20 for penalties or for competing in not enough races

Key
Colour	Result
Gold	Winner
Silver	2nd place
Bronze	3rd place
Green	Top ten position
Blue	Other points position
Purple	Out of points, retired
Red	Did not start (DNS)
White	unclear if retired or DNS

=== Team classification ===
Rank	Team	Points
1	Mapei–GB	101
2	Motorola	61
3	MG Maglificio–Technogym	60
4	Festina–Lotus	54
5	Roslotto–ZG Mobili	52
