= List of teams and cyclists in the 1997 Giro d'Italia =

The 1997 Giro d'Italia was the 80th edition of the Giro d'Italia, one of cycling's Grand Tours. The field consisted of 180 riders, and 110 riders finished the race.

== By rider ==
Legend
No.	Starting number worn by the rider during the Giro
Pos.	Position in the general classification
DNF	Denotes a rider who did not finish

No.	Name	Nationality	Team	Pos.	Ref
1	Pavel Tonkov	Russia	Mapei–GB	2	
2	Gianni Bugno	Italy	Mapei–GB	75	
3	Giuseppe Di Grande	Italy	Mapei–GB	7	
4	Davide Bramati	Italy	Mapei–GB	96	
5	Gianni Faresin	Italy	Mapei–GB	28	
6	Paolo Lanfranchi	Italy	Mapei–GB	DNF	
7	Gabriele Missaglia	Italy	Mapei–GB	53	
8	Gianluca Pianegonda	Italy	Mapei–GB	101	
9	Ján Svorada	Slovakia	Mapei–GB	DNF	
10	Zbigniew Spruch	Poland	Mapei–GB	100	
11	Stefano Faustini	Italy	Aki–Safi	DNF	
12	Michelangelo Cauz	Italy	Aki–Safi	109	
13	Leonardo Calzavara	Italy	Aki–Safi	35	
14	Oscar Della Costa	Italy	Aki–Safi	90	
15	Endrio Leoni	Italy	Aki–Safi	DNF	
16	Mauro Radaelli	Italy	Aki–Safi	DNF	
17	Emiliano Murtas	Italy	Aki–Safi	DNF	
18	Serhiy Honchar	Ukraine	Aki–Safi	5	
19	Nicola Miceli	Italy	Aki–Safi	4	
20	Denis Zanette	Italy	Aki–Safi	77	
21	Riccardo Forconi	Italy	Amore & Vita–ForzArcore	21	
22	Glenn Magnusson	Sweden	Amore & Vita–ForzArcore	85	
23	Nicolaj Bo Larsen	Denmark	Amore & Vita–ForzArcore	DNF	
24	Filippo Meloni	Italy	Amore & Vita–ForzArcore	DNF	
25	Gianpaolo Mondini	Italy	Amore & Vita–ForzArcore	67	
26	Marco Vergnani	Italy	Amore & Vita–ForzArcore	55	
27	Sandro Giacomelli	Italy	Amore & Vita–ForzArcore	108	
28	Dario Andriotto	Italy	Amore & Vita–ForzArcore	DNF	
29	Michele Laddomada	Italy	Amore & Vita–ForzArcore	65	
30	Andrea Patuelli	Italy	Amore & Vita–ForzArcore	49	
31	Alessandro Baronti	Italy	Asics–CGA	70	
32	Enrico Zaina	Italy	Asics–CGA	DNF	
33	Mario Chiesa	Italy	Asics–CGA	82	
34	Enrico Bonetti	Italy	Asics–CGA	DNF	
35	Filippo Simeoni	Italy	Asics–CGA	DNF	
36	Maurizio Molinari	Italy	Asics–CGA	57	
37	Oscar Pozzi	Italy	Asics–CGA	DNF	
38	Alexandr Shefer	Kazakhstan	Asics–CGA	DNF	
39	Fabio Roscioli	Italy	Asics–CGA	63	
40	Andrea Noè	Italy	Asics–CGA	11	
41	Evgeni Berzin	Russia	Batik–Del Monte	20	
42	Ermanno Brignoli	Italy	Batik–Del Monte	DNF	
43	Andrea Brognara	Italy	Batik–Del Monte	DNF	
44	Bruno Cenghialta	Italy	Batik–Del Monte	40	
45	Gabriele Colombo	Italy	Batik–Del Monte	DNF	
46	Francesco Frattini	Italy	Batik–Del Monte	71	
47	Armin Meier	Switzerland	Batik–Del Monte	DNF	
48	Nicola Minali	Italy	Batik–Del Monte	DNF	
49	Alessandro Spezialetti	Italy	Batik–Del Monte	DNF	
50	Alberto Volpi	Italy	Batik–Del Monte	16	
51	Wladimir Belli	Italy	Brescialat–Oyster	6	
52	Fabrizio Bontempi	Italy	Brescialat–Oyster	102	
53	Daniele Contrini	Italy	Brescialat–Oyster	DNF	
54	Marco Della Vedova	Italy	Brescialat–Oyster	60	
55	Cristiano Frattini	Italy	Brescialat–Oyster	86	
56	Marco Milesi	Italy	Brescialat–Oyster	DNF	
57	Mariano Piccoli	Italy	Brescialat–Oyster	48	
58	Omar Pumar	Venezuela	Brescialat–Oyster	73	
59	Roberto Sgambelluri	Italy	Brescialat–Oyster	32	
60	Marco Velo	Italy	Brescialat–Oyster	30	
61	Paolo Valoti	Italy	Cantina Tollo–Carrier–Starplast	DNF	
62	Alessandro Pozzi	Italy	Cantina Tollo–Carrier–Starplast	74	
63	Germano Pierdomenico	Italy	Cantina Tollo–Carrier–Starplast	36	
64	Uwe Peschel	Germany	Cantina Tollo–Carrier–Starplast	104	
65	Martin Hvastija	Slovenia	Cantina Tollo–Carrier–Starplast	59	
66	Massimiliano Gentili	Italy	Cantina Tollo–Carrier–Starplast	23	
67	Andrea Dolci	Italy	Cantina Tollo–Carrier–Starplast	DNF	
68	Lorenzo Di Silvestro	Italy	Cantina Tollo–Carrier–Starplast	DNF	
69	Marco Antonio Di Renzo	Italy	Cantina Tollo–Carrier–Starplast	110	
70	Andrea Paluan	Italy	Cantina Tollo–Carrier–Starplast	42	
71	Gianluca Bortolami	Italy	Festina–Lotus	34	
72	Bruno Boscardin	Italy	Festina–Lotus	66	
73	Félix García Casas	Spain	Festina–Lotus	12	
74	Patrice Halgand	France	Festina–Lotus	DNF	
75	Jaime Hernández	Spain	Festina–Lotus	64	
76	Fabian Jeker	Switzerland	Festina–Lotus	31	
77	Thierry Laurent	France	Festina–Lotus	DNF	
78	Lylian Lebreton	France	Festina–Lotus	68	
79	Marcel Wüst	Germany	Festina–Lotus	105	
80	Valerio Tebaldi	Italy	Festina–Lotus	69	
81	Juan Carlos Domínguez	Spain	Kelme–Costa Blanca	DNF	
82	Arsenio González	Spain	Kelme–Costa Blanca	52	
83	Ángel Edo	Spain	Kelme–Costa Blanca	DNF	
84	Marcos Serrano	Spain	Kelme–Costa Blanca	8	
85	Hernán Buenahora	Colombia	Kelme–Costa Blanca	DNF	
86	José Jaime González	Colombia	Kelme–Costa Blanca	15	
87	José Luis Rubiera	Spain	Kelme–Costa Blanca	10	
88	Francisco Cabello	Spain	Kelme–Costa Blanca	81	
89	José Javier Gómez Gonzalo	Spain	Kelme–Costa Blanca	22	
90	José Ángel Vidal	Spain	Kelme–Costa Blanca	78	
91	Vladimir Poulnikov	Ukraine	Kross–Montanari–Selle Italia	DNF	
92	Celio Roncancio	Colombia	Kross–Montanari–Selle Italia	DNF	
93	Marco Gilli	Italy	Kross–Montanari–Selle Italia	DNF	
94	Álvaro Lozano	Colombia	Kross–Montanari–Selle Italia	50	
95	Vassili Davidenko	Russia	Kross–Montanari–Selle Italia	DNF	
96	Simone Biasci	Italy	Kross–Montanari–Selle Italia	DNF	
97	Alessandro Calzolari	Italy	Kross–Montanari–Selle Italia	DNF	
98	Angelo Citracca	Italy	Kross–Montanari–Selle Italia	DNF	
99	Roberto Moretti	Italy	Kross–Montanari–Selle Italia	DNF	
100	Stefano Giraldi	Italy	Kross–Montanari–Selle Italia	95	
101	Marco Pantani	Italy	Mercatone Uno	DNF	
102	Massimo Podenzana	Italy	Mercatone Uno	17	
103	Oscar Pelliccioli	Italy	Mercatone Uno	39	
104	Stefano Garzelli	Italy	Mercatone Uno	9	
105	Mario Traversoni	Italy	Mercatone Uno	DNF	
106	Dario Bottaro	Italy	Mercatone Uno	99	
107	Simone Borgheresi	Italy	Mercatone Uno	DNF	
108	Roberto Conti	Italy	Mercatone Uno	18	
109	Sergio Barbero	Italy	Mercatone Uno	43	
110	Marcello Siboni	Italy	Mercatone Uno	26	
111	Fabio Baldato	Italy	MG Maglificio–Technogym	DNF	
112	Stefano Casagranda	Italy	MG Maglificio–Technogym	DNF	
113	Paolo Bettini	Italy	MG Maglificio–Technogym	25	
114	Michele Coppolillo	Italy	MG Maglificio–Technogym	33	
115	Fabiano Fontanelli	Italy	MG Maglificio–Technogym	92	
116	Angelo Lecchi	Italy	MG Maglificio–Technogym	56	
117	Roberto Pistore	Italy	MG Maglificio–Technogym	DNF	
118	Mauro-Antonio Santaromita	Italy	MG Maglificio–Technogym	107	
119	Nicola Loda	Italy	MG Maglificio–Technogym	44	
120	Gilberto Simoni	Italy	MG Maglificio–Technogym	DNF	
121	Leonardo Piepoli	Italy	Refin–Mobilvetta	DNF	
122	Felice Puttini	Switzerland	Refin–Mobilvetta	27	
123	Luca Mazzanti	Italy	Refin–Mobilvetta	41	
124	Elio Aggiano	Italy	Refin–Mobilvetta	DNF	
125	Gabriele Balducci	Italy	Refin–Mobilvetta	DNF	
126	Sergei Uslamin	Russia	Refin–Mobilvetta	51	
127	Tobias Steinhauser	Germany	Refin–Mobilvetta	DNF	
128	Jürgen Werner	Germany	Refin–Mobilvetta	DNF	
129	Marco Lietti	Italy	Refin–Mobilvetta	DNF	
130	Mauro Bettin	Italy	Refin–Mobilvetta	88	
131	Andrea Ferrigato	Italy	Roslotto–ZG Mobili	DNF	
132	Marco Fincato	Italy	Roslotto–ZG Mobili	46	
133	Piotr Ugrumov	Russia	Roslotto–ZG Mobili	DNF	
134	Dimitri Konyshev	Russia	Roslotto–ZG Mobili	37	
135	Viatcheslav Djavanian	Russia	Roslotto–ZG Mobili	80	
136	Torsten Schmidt	Germany	Roslotto–ZG Mobili	87	
137	Paolo Savoldelli	Italy	Roslotto–ZG Mobili	13	
138	Pavel Padrnos	Czech Republic	Roslotto–ZG Mobili	45	
139	Mario Manzoni	Italy	Roslotto–ZG Mobili	DNF	
140	Alexei Sivakov	Russia	Roslotto–ZG Mobili	47	
141	Vladislav Bobrik	Russia	Ros Mary–Minotti	DNF	
142	Roberto Caruso	Italy	Ros Mary–Minotti	76	
143	Daniele De Paoli	Italy	Ros Mary–Minotti	29	
144	Fausto Dotti	Italy	Ros Mary–Minotti	54	
145	Alessio Galletti	Italy	Ros Mary–Minotti	DNF	
146	Stefano Finesso	Italy	Ros Mary–Minotti	58	
147	Michele Poser	Italy	Ros Mary–Minotti	61	
148	David Tani	Italy	Ros Mary–Minotti	84	
149	Maurizio Tomi	Italy	Ros Mary–Minotti	DNF	
150	Manuele Scopsi	Italy	Ros Mary–Minotti	DNF	
151	Ivan Gotti	Italy	Saeco–Estro	1	
152	Mario Cipollini	Italy	Saeco–Estro	89	
153	Giuseppe Calcaterra	Italy	Saeco–Estro	103	
154	Massimo Donati	Italy	Saeco–Estro	38	
155	Gian Matteo Fagnini	Italy	Saeco–Estro	DNF	
156	Paolo Fornaciari	Italy	Saeco–Estro	98	
157	Dario Frigo	Italy	Saeco–Estro	14	
158	Alexandre Moos	Switzerland	Saeco–Estro	72	
159	Roberto Petito	Italy	Saeco–Estro	24	
160	Mario Scirea	Italy	Saeco–Estro	DNF	
161	Filippo Casagrande	Italy	Scrigno–Gaerne	DNF	
162	Stefano Casagrande	Italy	Scrigno–Gaerne	DNF	
163	Francesco Secchiari	Italy	Scrigno–Gaerne	DNF	
164	Alessio Barbagli	Italy	Scrigno–Gaerne	DNF	
165	Massimo Apollonio	Italy	Scrigno–Gaerne	83	
166	Andrea Vatteroni	Italy	Scrigno–Gaerne	DNF	
167	Cristian Gasperoni	Italy	Scrigno–Gaerne	DNF	
168	Mirko Rossato	Italy	Scrigno–Gaerne	DNF	
169	Sauro Gallorini	Italy	Scrigno–Gaerne	97	
170	Paolo Alberati	Italy	Scrigno–Gaerne	93	
171	Luc Leblanc	France	Team Polti	DNF	
172	Axel Merckx	Belgium	Team Polti	19	
173	Rossano Brasi	Italy	Team Polti	91	
174	Enrico Cassani	Italy	Team Polti	106	
175	Mirko Celestino	Italy	Team Polti	DNF	
176	Mirko Crepaldi	Italy	Team Polti	79	
177	Mirco Gualdi	Italy	Team Polti	62	
178	Giuseppe Guerini	Italy	Team Polti	3	
179	Serguei Outschakov	Ukraine	Team Polti	94	
180	Fabio Sacchi	Italy	Team Polti	DNF	
