= 1996 Giro d'Italia, Stage 1 to Stage 11 =

Cycling race stages

The 1996 Giro d'Italia was the 79th edition of the Giro d'Italia, one of cycling's Grand Tours. The Giro began in Athens, Greece, with a flat stage on 18 May, and Stage 11 occurred on 29 May with a stage to Marina di Massa. The race finished in Milan on 9 June.

== Stage 1 ==
18 May 1996 — Athens to Athens, 170 km (110 mi)

Stage 1 result

Rank	Rider	Team	Time
1	Silvio Martinello (ITA)	Saeco–AS Juvenes San Marino	4h 02' 58"
2	Fabrizio Guidi (ITA)	Scrigno–Blue Storm	s.t.
3	Stefano Zanini (ITA)	Gewiss Playbus	s.t.
4	Zbigniew Spruch (POL)	Panaria–Vinavil	s.t.
5	Mario Traversoni (ITA)	Carrera Jeans–Tassoni	s.t.
6	Glenn Magnusson (SWE)	Amore & Vita–ForzArcore	s.t.
7	Giovanni Lombardi (ITA)	Team Polti	s.t.
8	Adriano Baffi (ITA)	Mapei–GB	s.t.
9	Mirko Rossato (ITA)	Scrigno–Blue Storm	s.t.
10	Marco Vergnani (ITA)	Amore & Vita–ForzArcore	s.t.

General classification after Stage 1

Rank	Rider	Team	Time
1	Silvio Martinello (ITA)	Saeco–AS Juvenes San Marino	4h 02' 46"
2	Fabrizio Guidi (ITA)	Scrigno–Blue Storm	+ 4"
3	Daniele Contrini (ITA)	Brescialat	+ 6"
4	Stefano Zanini (ITA)	Gewiss Playbus	+ 8"
5	Fabrizio Bontempi (ITA)	Brescialat	s.t.
6	Mirko Rossato (ITA)	Scrigno–Blue Storm	+ 10"
7	Zbigniew Spruch (POL)	Panaria–Vinavil	+ 12"
8	Mario Traversoni (ITA)	Carrera Jeans–Tassoni	s.t.
9	Glenn Magnusson (SWE)	Amore & Vita–ForzArcore	s.t.
10	Giovanni Lombardi (ITA)	Team Polti	s.t.

== Stage 2 ==
19 May 1996 — Eleusis to Naupactus, 235 km (146 mi)

Stage 2 result

Rank	Rider	Team	Time
1	Glenn Magnusson (SWE)	Amore & Vita–ForzArcore	6h 39' 46"
2	Stefano Zanini (ITA)	Gewiss Playbus	s.t.
3	Ángel Edo (ESP)	Kelme–Artiach	s.t.
4	Mario Manzoni (ITA)	Roslotto–ZG Mobili	s.t.
5	Mario Traversoni (ITA)	Carrera Jeans–Tassoni	s.t.
6	Giovanni Lombardi (ITA)	Team Polti	s.t.
7	Gabriele Missaglia (ITA)	Panaria–Vinavil	s.t.
8	Fabrizio Guidi (ITA)	Scrigno–Blue Storm	s.t.
9	Mirko Rossato (ITA)	Scrigno–Blue Storm	s.t.
10	Martin van Steen (NED)	TVM–Farm Frites	s.t.

General classification after Stage 2

Rank	Rider	Team	Time
1	Silvio Martinello (ITA)	Saeco–AS Juvenes San Marino	10h 42' 26"
2	Stefano Zanini (ITA)	Gewiss Playbus	+ 4"
3	Glenn Magnusson (SWE)	Amore & Vita–ForzArcore	+ 6"
4	Fabrizio Guidi (ITA)	Scrigno–Blue Storm	+ 10"
5	Fabrizio Bontempi (ITA)	Brescialat	s.t.
6	Daniele Contrini (ITA)	Brescialat	+ 12"
7	Ángel Edo (ESP)	Kelme–Artiach	+ 14"
8	Mirko Rossato (ITA)	Scrigno–Blue Storm	+ 16"
9	Mario Traversoni (ITA)	Carrera Jeans–Tassoni	+ 18"
10	Giovanni Lombardi (ITA)	Team Polti	s.t.

== Stage 3 ==
20 May 1996 — Missolonghi to Ioannina, 199 km (124 mi)

Stage 3 result

Rank	Rider	Team	Time
1	Giovanni Lombardi (ITA)	Team Polti	4h 54' 42"
2	Stefano Zanini (ITA)	Gewiss Playbus	s.t.
3	Silvio Martinello (ITA)	Saeco–AS Juvenes San Marino	s.t.
4	Ángel Edo (ESP)	Kelme–Artiach	s.t.
5	Fabrizio Guidi (ITA)	Scrigno–Blue Storm	s.t.
6	Marco Vergnani (ITA)	Amore & Vita–ForzArcore	s.t.
7	Dimitri Konyshev (RUS)	Aki–Gipiemme	s.t.
8	Denis Zanette (ITA)	Aki–Gipiemme	s.t.
9	Mario Manzoni (ITA)	Roslotto–ZG Mobili	s.t.
10	Gabriele Missaglia (ITA)	Panaria–Vinavil	s.t.

General classification after Stage 3

Rank	Rider	Team	Time
1	Stefano Zanini (ITA)	Gewiss Playbus	15h 37' 04"
2	Silvio Martinello (ITA)	Saeco–AS Juvenes San Marino	s.t.
3	Giovanni Lombardi (ITA)	Team Polti	+ 4"
4	Fabrizio Guidi (ITA)	Scrigno–Blue Storm	+ 14"
5	Fabrizio Bontempi (ITA)	Brescialat	s.t.
6	Ángel Edo (ESP)	Kelme–Artiach	+ 18"
7	Djamolidine Abdoujaparov (UZB)	Refin–Mobilvetta	s.t.
8	Davide Bramati (ITA)	Panaria–Vinavil	+ 20"
9	Mario Traversoni (ITA)	Carrera Jeans–Tassoni	+ 22"
10	Mario Manzoni (ITA)	Roslotto–ZG Mobili	s.t.

== Rest day ==
21 May 1996

== Stage 4 ==
22 May 1996 — Ostuni to Ostuni, 147 km (91 mi)

Stage 4 result

Rank	Rider	Team	Time
1	Mario Cipollini (ITA)	Saeco–AS Juvenes San Marino	3h 31' 39"
2	Silvio Martinello (ITA)	Saeco–AS Juvenes San Marino	s.t.
3	Fabrizio Guidi (ITA)	Scrigno–Blue Storm	s.t.
4	Mario Manzoni (ITA)	Roslotto–ZG Mobili	s.t.
5	Gianluca Bortolami (ITA)	Mapei–GB	s.t.
6	Zbigniew Spruch (POL)	Panaria–Vinavil	s.t.
7	Davide Rebellin (ITA)	Team Polti	s.t.
8	Mariano Piccoli (ITA)	Brescialat	s.t.
9	Beat Zberg (SUI)	Carrera Jeans–Tassoni	s.t.
10	Marco Vergnani (ITA)	Amore & Vita–ForzArcore	s.t.

General classification after Stage 4

Rank	Rider	Team	Time
1	Silvio Martinello (ITA)	Saeco–AS Juvenes San Marino	19h 08' 35"
2	Stefano Zanini (ITA)	Gewiss Playbus	+ 6"
3	Fabrizio Guidi (ITA)	Scrigno–Blue Storm	+ 12"
4	Fabrizio Bontempi (ITA)	Brescialat	+ 18"
5	Ángel Edo (ESP)	Kelme–Artiach	+ 26"
6	Davide Bramati (ITA)	Panaria–Vinavil	+ 28"
7	Mario Manzoni (ITA)	Roslotto–ZG Mobili	+ 30"
8	Zbigniew Spruch (POL)	Panaria–Vinavil	s.t.
9	Marco Vergnani (ITA)	Amore & Vita–ForzArcore	s.t.
10	Gianluca Bortolami (ITA)	Mapei–GB	s.t.

== Stage 5 ==
23 May 1996 — Metaponto to Crotone, 196 km (122 mi)

Stage 5 result

Rank	Rider	Team	Time
1	Ángel Edo (ESP)	Kelme–Artiach	5h 01' 59"
2	Massimo Strazzer (ITA)	Brescialat	s.t.
3	Silvio Martinello (ITA)	Saeco–AS Juvenes San Marino	s.t.
4	Giovanni Lombardi (ITA)	Team Polti	s.t.
5	Adriano Baffi (ITA)	Mapei–GB	s.t.
6	Mario Traversoni (ITA)	Carrera Jeans–Tassoni	s.t.
7	Denis Zanette (ITA)	Aki–Gipiemme	s.t.
8	Gabriele Missaglia (ITA)	Panaria–Vinavil	s.t.
9	Francesco Casagrande (ITA)	Saeco–AS Juvenes San Marino	s.t.
10	Zbigniew Spruch (POL)	Panaria–Vinavil	s.t.

General classification after Stage 5

Rank	Rider	Team	Time
1	Silvio Martinello (ITA)	Saeco–AS Juvenes San Marino	24h 10' 24"
2	Stefano Zanini (ITA)	Gewiss Playbus	+ 16"
3	Fabrizio Guidi (ITA)	Scrigno–Blue Storm	+ 22"
4	Ángel Edo (ESP)	Kelme–Artiach	+ 24"
5	Fabrizio Bontempi (ITA)	Brescialat	s.t.
6	Davide Bramati (ITA)	Panaria–Vinavil	+ 38"
7	Mario Manzoni (ITA)	Roslotto–ZG Mobili	+ 40"
8	Zbigniew Spruch (POL)	Panaria–Vinavil	s.t.
9	Gabriele Missaglia (ITA)	Panaria–Vinavil	s.t.
10	Denis Zanette (ITA)	Aki–Gipiemme	s.t.

== Stage 6 ==
24 May 1996 — Crotone to Catanzaro, 179 km (111 mi)

Stage 6 result

Rank	Rider	Team	Time
1	Pascal Hervé (FRA)	Festina–Lotus	4h 29' 45"
2	Roberto Petito (ITA)	Saeco–AS Juvenes San Marino	+ 4"
3	Francesco Casagrande (ITA)	Saeco–AS Juvenes San Marino	+ 12"
4	Davide Rebellin (ITA)	Team Polti	s.t.
5	Leonardo Piepoli (ITA)	Refin–Mobilvetta	s.t.
6	Evgeni Berzin (RUS)	Gewiss Playbus	s.t.
7	Enrico Zaina (ITA)	Carrera Jeans–Tassoni	s.t.
8	Alexander Gontchenkov (UKR)	Roslotto–ZG Mobili	s.t.
9	Abraham Olano (ESP)	Mapei–GB	s.t.
10	Giorgio Furlan (ITA)	Saeco–AS Juvenes San Marino	s.t.

General classification after Stage 6

Rank	Rider	Team	Time
1	Pascal Hervé (FRA)	Festina–Lotus	28h 40' 37"
2	Fabrizio Guidi (ITA)	Scrigno–Blue Storm	+ 6"
3	Roberto Petito (ITA)	Saeco–AS Juvenes San Marino	+ 8"
4	Fabrizio Bontempi (ITA)	Brescialat	+ 17"
5	Francesco Casagrande (ITA)	Saeco–AS Juvenes San Marino	+ 20"
6	Marco Vergnani (ITA)	Amore & Vita–ForzArcore	+ 24"
7	Davide Rebellin (ITA)	Team Polti	s.t.
8	Mariano Piccoli (ITA)	Brescialat	s.t.
9	Leonardo Piepoli (ITA)	Refin–Mobilvetta	s.t.
10	Alexander Gontchenkov (UKR)	Roslotto–ZG Mobili	s.t.

== Stage 7 ==
25 May 1996 — Amantea to Massiccio del Sirino, 164 km (102 mi)

Stage 7 result

Rank	Rider	Team	Time
1	Davide Rebellin (ITA)	Team Polti	4h 30' 35"
2	Pavel Tonkov (RUS)	Panaria–Vinavil	s.t.
3	Stefano Faustini (ITA)	Aki–Gipiemme	s.t.
4	Leonardo Piepoli (ITA)	Refin–Mobilvetta	+ 4"
5	Piotr Ugrumov (RUS)	Roslotto–ZG Mobili	+ 6"
6	Ivan Gotti (ITA)	Gewiss Playbus	+ 8"
7	Giuseppe Guerini (ITA)	Team Polti	+ 12"
8	Francesco Casagrande (ITA)	Saeco–AS Juvenes San Marino	s.t.
9	Evgeni Berzin (RUS)	Gewiss Playbus	+ 14"
10	Georg Totschnig (AUT)	Team Polti	+ 17"

General classification after Stage 7

Rank	Rider	Team	Time
1	Davide Rebellin (ITA)	Team Polti	33h 11' 35"
2	Pavel Tonkov (RUS)	Panaria–Vinavil	+ 4"
3	Stefano Faustini (ITA)	Aki–Gipiemme	+ 8"
4	Leonardo Piepoli (ITA)	Refin–Mobilvetta	+ 16"
5	Piotr Ugrumov (RUS)	Roslotto–ZG Mobili	+ 18"
6	Francesco Casagrande (ITA)	Saeco–AS Juvenes San Marino	+ 20"
7	Ivan Gotti (ITA)	Gewiss Playbus	s.t.
8	Giuseppe Guerini (ITA)	Team Polti	+ 24"
9	Pascal Hervé (FRA)	Festina–Lotus	+ 26"
10	Evgeni Berzin (RUS)	Gewiss Playbus	s.t.

== Stage 8 ==
26 May 1996 — Polla to Naples, 135 km (84 mi)

Stage 8 result

Rank	Rider	Team	Time
1	Mario Cipollini (ITA)	Saeco–AS Juvenes San Marino	3h 04' 34"
2	Fabrizio Guidi (ITA)	Scrigno–Blue Storm	s.t.
3	Giovanni Lombardi (ITA)	Team Polti	s.t.
4	Silvio Martinello (ITA)	Saeco–AS Juvenes San Marino	s.t.
5	Djamolidine Abdoujaparov (UZB)	Refin–Mobilvetta	s.t.
6	Adriano Baffi (ITA)	Mapei–GB	s.t.
7	Marco Serpellini (ITA)	Panaria–Vinavil	s.t.
8	Mirko Rossato (ITA)	Scrigno–Blue Storm	s.t.
9	Martin van Steen (NED)	TVM–Farm Frites	s.t.
10	Denis Zanette (ITA)	Aki–Gipiemme	s.t.

General classification after Stage 8

Rank	Rider	Team	Time
1	Davide Rebellin (ITA)	Team Polti	36h 15' 58"
2	Pavel Tonkov (RUS)	Panaria–Vinavil	+ 4"
3	Stefano Faustini (ITA)	Aki–Gipiemme	+ 8"
4	Leonardo Piepoli (ITA)	Refin–Mobilvetta	+ 16"
5	Piotr Ugrumov (RUS)	Roslotto–ZG Mobili	+ 18"
6	Francesco Casagrande (ITA)	Saeco–AS Juvenes San Marino	+ 20"
7	Ivan Gotti (ITA)	Gewiss Playbus	s.t.
8	Giuseppe Guerini (ITA)	Team Polti	+ 24"
9	Pascal Hervé (FRA)	Festina–Lotus	+ 26"
10	Evgeni Berzin (RUS)	Gewiss Playbus	s.t.

== Stage 9 ==
27 May 1996 — Naples to Fiuggi, 184 km (114 mi)

Stage 9 result

Rank	Rider	Team	Time
1	Enrico Zaina (ITA)	Carrera Jeans–Tassoni	4h 24' 48"
2	Fabrizio Guidi (ITA)	Scrigno–Blue Storm	s.t.
3	Zbigniew Spruch (POL)	Panaria–Vinavil	s.t.
4	Davide Rebellin (ITA)	Team Polti	s.t.
5	Marco Vergnani (ITA)	Amore & Vita–ForzArcore	s.t.
6	Francesco Casagrande (ITA)	Saeco–AS Juvenes San Marino	s.t.
7	Evgeni Berzin (RUS)	Gewiss Playbus	s.t.
8	Mariano Piccoli (ITA)	Brescialat	s.t.
9	Stefano Faustini (ITA)	Aki–Gipiemme	s.t.
10	Pascal Hervé (FRA)	Festina–Lotus	s.t.

General classification after Stage 9

Rank	Rider	Team	Time
1	Davide Rebellin (ITA)	Team Polti	40h 40' 50"
2	Pavel Tonkov (RUS)	Panaria–Vinavil	+ 4"
3	Stefano Faustini (ITA)	Aki–Gipiemme	+ 8"
4	Enrico Zaina (ITA)	Carrera Jeans–Tassoni	+ 13"
5	Leonardo Piepoli (ITA)	Refin–Mobilvetta	+ 16"
6	Piotr Ugrumov (RUS)	Roslotto–ZG Mobili	+ 18"
7	Francesco Casagrande (ITA)	Saeco–AS Juvenes San Marino	+ 20"
8	Ivan Gotti (ITA)	Gewiss Playbus	s.t.
9	Pascal Hervé (FRA)	Festina–Lotus	+ 26"
10	Evgeni Berzin (RUS)	Gewiss Playbus	s.t.

== Stage 10 ==
28 May 1996 — Arezzo to Prato, 164 km (102 mi)

Stage 10 result

Rank	Rider	Team	Time
1	Rodolfo Massi (ITA)	Refin–Mobilvetta	3h 56' 48"
2	Giorgio Furlan (ITA)	Saeco–AS Juvenes San Marino	+ 4"
3	Francesco Casagrande (ITA)	Saeco–AS Juvenes San Marino	s.t.
4	Claudio Chiappucci (ITA)	Carrera Jeans–Tassoni	s.t.
5	Abraham Olano (ESP)	Mapei–GB	s.t.
6	Enrico Zaina (ITA)	Carrera Jeans–Tassoni	s.t.
7	Alexander Gontchenkov (UKR)	Roslotto–ZG Mobili	s.t.
8	Gianni Faresin (ITA)	Panaria–Vinavil	s.t.
9	Manuel Fernández Ginés (ESP)	Mapei–GB	s.t.
10	Beat Zberg (SUI)	Carrera Jeans–Tassoni	s.t.

General classification after Stage 10

Rank	Rider	Team	Time
1	Davide Rebellin (ITA)	Team Polti	44h 37' 32"
2	Pavel Tonkov (RUS)	Panaria–Vinavil	+ 4"
3	Stefano Faustini (ITA)	Aki–Gipiemme	+ 8"
4	Enrico Zaina (ITA)	Carrera Jeans–Tassoni	+ 13"
5	Francesco Casagrande (ITA)	Saeco–AS Juvenes San Marino	+ 16"
6	Leonardo Piepoli (ITA)	Refin–Mobilvetta	s.t.
7	Piotr Ugrumov (RUS)	Roslotto–ZG Mobili	+ 18"
8	Ivan Gotti (ITA)	Gewiss Playbus	+ 20"
9	Pascal Hervé (FRA)	Festina–Lotus	+ 26"
10	Evgeni Berzin (RUS)	Gewiss Playbus	s.t.

== Stage 11 ==
29 May 1996 — Prato to Marina di Massa, 130 km (81 mi)

Stage 11 result

Rank	Rider	Team	Time
1	Mario Cipollini (ITA)	Saeco–AS Juvenes San Marino	2h 51' 48"
2	Djamolidine Abdoujaparov (UZB)	Refin–Mobilvetta	s.t.
3	Silvio Martinello (ITA)	Saeco–AS Juvenes San Marino	s.t.
4	Denis Zanette (ITA)	Aki–Gipiemme	s.t.
5	Mario Traversoni (ITA)	Carrera Jeans–Tassoni	s.t.
6	Zbigniew Spruch (POL)	Panaria–Vinavil	s.t.
7	Marco Vergnani (ITA)	Amore & Vita–ForzArcore	s.t.
8	Gabriele Missaglia (ITA)	Panaria–Vinavil	s.t.
9	Glenn Magnusson (SWE)	Amore & Vita–ForzArcore	s.t.
10	Fausto Dotti (ITA)	Brescialat	s.t.

General classification after Stage 11

Rank	Rider	Team	Time
1	Davide Rebellin (ITA)	Team Polti	47h 29' 20"
2	Pavel Tonkov (RUS)	Panaria–Vinavil	+ 4"
3	Stefano Faustini (ITA)	Aki–Gipiemme	+ 8"
4	Enrico Zaina (ITA)	Carrera Jeans–Tassoni	+ 13"
5	Francesco Casagrande (ITA)	Saeco–AS Juvenes San Marino	+ 16"
6	Leonardo Piepoli (ITA)	Refin–Mobilvetta	s.t.
7	Piotr Ugrumov (RUS)	Roslotto–ZG Mobili	+ 18"
8	Ivan Gotti (ITA)	Gewiss Playbus	+ 20"
9	Pascal Hervé (FRA)	Festina–Lotus	+ 26"
10	Evgeni Berzin (RUS)	Gewiss Playbus	s.t.
