= 1996 Leeds International Classic =

Road cycling race

1996 UCI Road World Cup

Race details
- Dates: 18 August 1996
- Stages: 1
- Distance: 235 km (146.0 mi)
- Winning time: 5h 43' 13"

Results
	Winner	Andrea Ferrigato (ITA)	(Roslotto–ZG Mobili)
	Second	Maximilian Sciandri (GBR)	(Motorola)
	Third	Johan Museeuw (BEL)	(Mapei–GB)

The 1996 Leeds International Classic was the 8th edition of the Leeds International Classic cycle race (also known as Wincanton Classic and Rochester International Classic) and was held on 18 August. The race took place in and around Leeds. The race was won by Andrea Ferrigato of the Roslotto–ZG Mobili team.

== Results ==
	Rider	Team	Time
1	Andrea Ferrigato (ITA)	Roslotto–ZG Mobili	5h 43' 13"
2	Maximilian Sciandri (GBR)	Motorola	+ 1"
3	Johan Museeuw (BEL)	Mapei–GB	+ 20"
4	Lance Armstrong (USA)	Motorola	s.t.
5	Michele Bartoli (ITA)	MG Maglificio–Technogym	s.t.
6	Davide Rebellin (ITA)	Team Polti	s.t.
7	Marco Fincato (ITA)	Roslotto–ZG Mobili	s.t.
8	Andrea Tafi (ITA)	Mapei–GB	s.t.
9	Marco Milesi (ITA)	Brescialat	+ 1' 01"
10	Stefano Colagè (ITA)	Refin–Mobilvetta	+ 1' 09"

Maximilan Sciandri had 10 points removed by penalty in the World Cup general classification for not attending the final ceremony
