= 1994 Giro d'Italia, Stage 12 to Stage 22 =

Cycling race stages

The 1994 Giro d'Italia was the 77th edition of the Giro d'Italia, one of cycling's Grand Tours. The Giro began in Bologna, with a flat stage on 22 May, and Stage 12 occurred on 2 June with a stage from Bibione. The race finished in Milan on 12 June.

== Stage 12 ==
2 June 1994 — Bibione to Kranj, 204 km (127 mi)

Stage 12 result

Rank	Rider	Team	Time
1	Andrea Ferrigato (ITA)	ZG Mobili	4h 47' 04"
2	Fabio Baldato (ITA)	GB–MG Maglificio	s.t.
3	Djamolidine Abdoujaparov (UZB)	Team Polti–Vaporetto	+ 2"
4	Dimitri Konyshev (RUS)	Jolly Componibili–Cage 1994	s.t.
5	Stefano Zanini (ITA)	Navigare–Blue Storm	s.t.
6	Fabio Bordonali (ITA)	Brescialat–Ceramiche Refin	s.t.
7	Jens Heppner (GER)	Team Telekom	s.t.
8	Gianni Bugno (ITA)	Team Polti–Vaporetto	s.t.
9	Michele Bartoli (ITA)	Mercatone Uno–Medeghini	s.t.
10	Francesco Casagrande (ITA)	Mercatone Uno–Medeghini	s.t.

General classification after Stage 12

Rank	Rider	Team	Time
1	Evgeni Berzin (RUS)	Gewiss–Ballan	46h 25' 42"
2	Armand de Las Cuevas (FRA)	Castorama	+ 2' 16"
3	Gianni Bugno (ITA)	Team Polti–Vaporetto	+ 2' 32"
4	Miguel Induráin (ESP)	Banesto	+ 3' 39"
5	Marco Giovannetti (ITA)	Mapei–CLAS	+ 4' 58"
6	Francesco Casagrande (ITA)	Mercatone Uno–Medeghini	+ 5' 02"
7	Wladimir Belli (ITA)	Lampre–Panaria	+ 5' 24"
8	Pavel Tonkov (RUS)	Lampre–Panaria	+ 6' 09"
9	Massimo Podenzana (ITA)	Navigare–Blue Storm	+ 6' 25"
10	Moreno Argentin (ITA)	Gewiss–Ballan	+ 6' 42"

== Stage 13 ==
3 June 1994 — Kranj to Lienz, 231 km (144 mi)

Stage 13 result

Rank	Rider	Team	Time
1	Michele Bartoli (ITA)	Mercatone Uno–Medeghini	5h 56' 49"
2	Fabiano Fontanelli (ITA)	ZG Mobili	+ 2' 31"
3	Flavio Vanzella (ITA)	GB–MG Maglificio	+ 2' 59"
4	Laurent Madouas (FRA)	Castorama	s.t.
5	Thomas Davy (FRA)	Castorama	+ 3' 06"
6	Mario Chiesa (ITA)	Carrera Jeans–Tassoni	+ 3' 49"
7	Alberto Volpi (ITA)	Gewiss–Ballan	+ 3' 59"
8	Paolo Fornaciari (ITA)	Mercatone Uno–Medeghini	+ 6' 45"
9	Néstor Mora (COL)	Kelme–Avianca–Gios	s.t.
10	Riccardo Forconi (ITA)	Amore & Vita–Galatron	+ 8' 59"

General classification after Stage 13

Rank	Rider	Team	Time
1	Evgeni Berzin (RUS)	Gewiss–Ballan	52h 36' 01"
2	Armand de Las Cuevas (FRA)	Castorama	+ 2' 16"
3	Gianni Bugno (ITA)	Team Polti–Vaporetto	+ 2' 32"
4	Miguel Induráin (ESP)	Banesto	+ 3' 39"
5	Marco Giovannetti (ITA)	Mapei–CLAS	+ 4' 58"
6	Francesco Casagrande (ITA)	Mercatone Uno–Medeghini	+ 5' 02"
7	Wladimir Belli (ITA)	Lampre–Panaria	+ 5' 24"
8	Pavel Tonkov (RUS)	Lampre–Panaria	+ 6' 09"
9	Massimo Podenzana (ITA)	Navigare–Blue Storm	+ 6' 25"
10	Marco Pantani (ITA)	Carrera Jeans–Tassoni	+ 6' 28"

== Stage 14 ==
4 June 1994 — Lienz to Merano, 235 km (146 mi)

Stage 14 result

Rank	Rider	Team	Time
1	Marco Pantani (ITA)	Carrera Jeans–Tassoni	7h 43' 04"
2	Gianni Bugno (ITA)	Team Polti–Vaporetto	+ 40"
3	Claudio Chiappucci (ITA)	Carrera Jeans–Tassoni	s.t.
4	Davide Rebellin (ITA)	GB–MG Maglificio	s.t.
5	Evgeni Berzin (RUS)	Gewiss–Ballan	s.t.
6	Miguel Induráin (ESP)	Banesto	s.t.
7	Massimo Podenzana (ITA)	Navigare–Blue Storm	s.t.
8	Flavio Giupponi (ITA)	Brescialat–Ceramiche Refin	s.t.
9	Serguei Outschakov (UKR)	Team Polti–Vaporetto	s.t.
10	Nelson Rodríguez Serna (COL)	ZG Mobili	s.t.

General classification after Stage 14

Rank	Rider	Team	Time
1	Evgeni Berzin (RUS)	Gewiss–Ballan	60h 19' 45"
2	Armand de Las Cuevas (FRA)	Castorama	+ 2' 16"
3	Gianni Bugno (ITA)	Team Polti–Vaporetto	+ 2' 24"
4	Miguel Induráin (ESP)	Banesto	+ 3' 39"
5	Wladimir Belli (ITA)	Lampre–Panaria	+ 5' 24"
6	Marco Pantani (ITA)	Carrera Jeans–Tassoni	+ 5' 36"
7	Pavel Tonkov (RUS)	Lampre–Panaria	+ 6' 09"
8	Massimo Podenzana (ITA)	Navigare–Blue Storm	+ 6' 25"
9	Moreno Argentin (ITA)	Gewiss–Ballan	+ 6' 42"
10	Davide Rebellin (ITA)	GB–MG Maglificio	+ 8' 38"

== Stage 15 ==
5 June 1994 — Merano to Aprica, 188 km (117 mi)

Stage 15 result

Rank	Rider	Team	Time
1	Marco Pantani (ITA)	Carrera Jeans–Tassoni	6h 55' 58"
2	Claudio Chiappucci (ITA)	Carrera Jeans–Tassoni	+ 2' 52"
3	Wladimir Belli (ITA)	Lampre–Panaria	+ 3' 27"
4	Nelson Rodríguez Serna (COL)	ZG Mobili	s.t.
5	Miguel Induráin (ESP)	Banesto	+ 3' 30"
6	Evgeni Berzin (RUS)	Gewiss–Ballan	+ 4' 06"
7	Udo Bölts (GER)	Team Telekom	s.t.
8	Gianni Bugno (ITA)	Team Polti–Vaporetto	+ 5' 50"
9	Vladimir Poulnikov (UKR)	Carrera Jeans–Tassoni	s.t.
10	Pavel Tonkov (RUS)	Lampre–Panaria	s.t.

General classification after Stage 15

Rank	Rider	Team	Time
1	Evgeni Berzin (RUS)	Gewiss–Ballan	67h 19' 49"
2	Marco Pantani (ITA)	Carrera Jeans–Tassoni	+ 1' 18"
3	Miguel Induráin (ESP)	Banesto	+ 3' 03"
4	Gianni Bugno (ITA)	Team Polti–Vaporetto	+ 4' 08"
5	Wladimir Belli (ITA)	Lampre–Panaria	+ 4' 41"
6	Armand de Las Cuevas (FRA)	Castorama	+ 5' 12"
7	Pavel Tonkov (RUS)	Lampre–Panaria	+ 7' 53"
8	Claudio Chiappucci (ITA)	Carrera Jeans–Tassoni	+ 9' 13"
9	Nelson Rodríguez Serna (COL)	ZG Mobili	+ 10' 15"
10	Andrew Hampsten (USA)	Motorola	+ 11' 48"

== Stage 16 ==
6 June 1994 — Sondrio to Stradella, 220 km (140 mi)

Stage 16 result

Rank	Rider	Team	Time
1	Max Sciandri (ITA)	GB–MG Maglificio	6h 24' 36"
2	Fabiano Fontanelli (ITA)	ZG Mobili	s.t.
3	Enrico Zaina (ITA)	Gewiss–Ballan	s.t.
4	Djamolidine Abdoujaparov (UZB)	Team Polti–Vaporetto	s.t.
5	Stefano Zanini (ITA)	Navigare–Blue Storm	s.t.
6	Giovanni Lombardi (ITA)	Lampre–Panaria	s.t.
7	Gianluca Bortolami (ITA)	Mapei–CLAS	s.t.
8	Massimo Ghirotto (ITA)	ZG Mobili	s.t.
9	Rolf Sørensen (DEN)	GB–MG Maglificio	s.t.
10	Gianni Bugno (ITA)	Team Polti–Vaporetto	s.t.

General classification after Stage 16

Rank	Rider	Team	Time
1	Evgeni Berzin (RUS)	Gewiss–Ballan	74h 44' 26"
2	Marco Pantani (ITA)	Carrera Jeans–Tassoni	+ 1' 18"
3	Miguel Induráin (ESP)	Banesto	+ 3' 03"
4	Gianni Bugno (ITA)	Team Polti–Vaporetto	+ 4' 08"
5	Wladimir Belli (ITA)	Lampre–Panaria	+ 4' 41"
6	Armand de Las Cuevas (FRA)	Castorama	+ 5' 12"
7	Pavel Tonkov (RUS)	Lampre–Panaria	+ 7' 53"
8	Claudio Chiappucci (ITA)	Carrera Jeans–Tassoni	+ 9' 13"
9	Nelson Rodríguez Serna (COL)	ZG Mobili	+ 10' 15"
10	Andrew Hampsten (USA)	Motorola	+ 12' 00"

== Stage 17 ==
7 June 1994 — Santa Maria della Versa to Lavagna, 200 km (120 mi)

Stage 17 result

Rank	Rider	Team	Time
1	Ján Svorada (SVK)	Lampre–Panaria	5h 26' 04"
2	Giovanni Lombardi (ITA)	Lampre–Panaria	+ 2"
3	Djamolidine Abdoujaparov (UZB)	Team Polti–Vaporetto	s.t.
4	Roberto Pagnin (ITA)	Navigare–Blue Storm	s.t.
5	Giancarlo Perini (ITA)	ZG Mobili	s.t.
6	Zbigniew Spruch (POL)	Lampre–Panaria	+ 56"
7	Fabio Baldato (ITA)	GB–MG Maglificio	s.t.
8	Fabiano Fontanelli (ITA)	ZG Mobili	s.t.
9	Dimitri Konyshev (RUS)	Jolly Componibili–Cage 1994	s.t.
10	Fabio Roscioli (ITA)	Brescialat–Ceramiche Refin	s.t.

General classification after Stage 17

Rank	Rider	Team	Time
1	Evgeni Berzin (RUS)	Gewiss–Ballan	79h 11' 24"
2	Marco Pantani (ITA)	Carrera Jeans–Tassoni	+ 1' 18"
3	Miguel Induráin (ESP)	Banesto	+ 3' 03"
4	Gianni Bugno (ITA)	Team Polti–Vaporetto	+ 4' 08"
5	Wladimir Belli (ITA)	Lampre–Panaria	+ 4' 41"
6	Armand de Las Cuevas (FRA)	Castorama	+ 5' 12"
7	Pavel Tonkov (RUS)	Lampre–Panaria	+ 7' 53"
8	Claudio Chiappucci (ITA)	Carrera Jeans–Tassoni	+ 9' 13"
9	Nelson Rodríguez Serna (COL)	ZG Mobili	+ 10' 15"
10	Andrew Hampsten (USA)	Motorola	+ 12' 00"

== Stage 18 ==
8 June 1994 — Chiavari to Passo del Bocco, 35 km (22 mi) (ITT)

Stage 18 result

Rank	Rider	Team	Time
1	Evgeni Berzin (RUS)	Gewiss–Ballan	59' 52"
2	Miguel Induráin (ESP)	Banesto	+ 20"
3	Marco Pantani (ITA)	Carrera Jeans–Tassoni	+ 1' 37"
4	Armand de Las Cuevas (FRA)	Castorama	+ 2' 04"
5	Massimo Podenzana (ITA)	Navigare–Blue Storm	+ 2' 11"
6	Claudio Chiappucci (ITA)	Carrera Jeans–Tassoni	+ 2' 39"
7	Georg Totschnig (AUT)	Team Polti–Vaporetto	+ 2' 59"
8	Gianni Bugno (ITA)	Team Polti–Vaporetto	+ 3' 07"
9	Pavel Tonkov (RUS)	Lampre–Panaria	+ 3' 10"
10	Vladimir Poulnikov (UKR)	Carrera Jeans–Tassoni	+ 3' 21"

General classification after Stage 18

Rank	Rider	Team	Time
1	Evgeni Berzin (RUS)	Gewiss–Ballan	80h 11' 18"
2	Marco Pantani (ITA)	Carrera Jeans–Tassoni	+ 2' 55"
3	Miguel Induráin (ESP)	Banesto	+ 3' 23"
4	Gianni Bugno (ITA)	Team Polti–Vaporetto	+ 7' 15"
5	Armand de Las Cuevas (FRA)	Castorama	+ 7' 16"
6	Wladimir Belli (ITA)	Lampre–Panaria	+ 9' 12"
7	Pavel Tonkov (RUS)	Lampre–Panaria	+ 11' 03"
8	Claudio Chiappucci (ITA)	Carrera Jeans–Tassoni	+ 11' 34"
9	Nelson Rodríguez Serna (COL)	ZG Mobili	+ 15' 26"
10	Andrew Hampsten (USA)	Motorola	+ 15' 53"

== Stage 19 ==
9 June 1994 — Lavagna to Bra, 212 km (132 mi)

Stage 19 result

Rank	Rider	Team	Time
1	Massimo Ghirotto (ITA)	ZG Mobili	5h 26' 50"
2	Rolf Sørensen (DEN)	GB–MG Maglificio	s.t.
3	Massimo Podenzana (ITA)	Navigare–Blue Storm	s.t.
4	Rodolfo Massi (ITA)	Amore & Vita–Galatron	s.t.
5	Paolo Fornaciari (ITA)	Mercatone Uno–Medeghini	+ 2' 17"
6	Fabio Bordonali (ITA)	Brescialat–Ceramiche Refin	s.t.
7	Maurizio Molinari (ITA)	Amore & Vita–Galatron	s.t.
8	Andrea Ferrigato (ITA)	ZG Mobili	s.t.
9	Fabio Roscioli (ITA)	Brescialat–Ceramiche Refin	s.t.
10	Mariano Piccoli (ITA)	Mercatone Uno–Medeghini	s.t.

General classification after Stage 19

Rank	Rider	Team	Time
1	Evgeni Berzin (RUS)	Gewiss–Ballan	85h 40' 29"
2	Marco Pantani (ITA)	Carrera Jeans–Tassoni	+ 2' 55"
3	Miguel Induráin (ESP)	Banesto	+ 3' 23"
4	Gianni Bugno (ITA)	Team Polti–Vaporetto	+ 7' 15"
5	Armand de Las Cuevas (FRA)	Castorama	+ 7' 16"
6	Wladimir Belli (ITA)	Lampre–Panaria	+ 9' 12"
7	Pavel Tonkov (RUS)	Lampre–Panaria	+ 11' 03"
8	Claudio Chiappucci (ITA)	Carrera Jeans–Tassoni	+ 11' 34"
9	Nelson Rodríguez Serna (COL)	ZG Mobili	+ 15' 26"
10	Andrew Hampsten (USA)	Motorola	+ 15' 53"

== Stage 20 ==
10 June 1994 — Cuneo to Les Deux Alpes, 201 km (125 mi)

Stage 20 result

Rank	Rider	Team	Time
1	Vladimir Poulnikov (UKR)	Carrera Jeans–Tassoni	6h 28' 50"
2	Nelson Rodríguez Serna (COL)	ZG Mobili	s.t.
3	Roberto Conti (ITA)	Lampre–Panaria	+ 14"
4	Massimo Podenzana (ITA)	Navigare–Blue Storm	+ 21"
5	Georg Totschnig (AUT)	Team Polti–Vaporetto	+ 30"
6	Hernán Buenahora (COL)	Kelme–Avianca–Gios	+ 1' 51"
7	Marco Pantani (ITA)	Carrera Jeans–Tassoni	+ 1' 55"
8	Miguel Induráin (ESP)	Banesto	s.t.
9	Evgeni Berzin (RUS)	Gewiss–Ballan	s.t.
10	Pavel Tonkov (RUS)	Lampre–Panaria	s.t.

General classification after Stage 20

Rank	Rider	Team	Time
1	Evgeni Berzin (RUS)	Gewiss–Ballan	92h 11' 14"
2	Marco Pantani (ITA)	Carrera Jeans–Tassoni	+ 2' 55"
3	Miguel Induráin (ESP)	Banesto	+ 3' 23"
4	Pavel Tonkov (RUS)	Lampre–Panaria	+ 11' 16"
5	Claudio Chiappucci (ITA)	Carrera Jeans–Tassoni	+ 12' 07"
6	Nelson Rodríguez Serna (COL)	ZG Mobili	+ 13' 23"
7	Massimo Podenzana (ITA)	Navigare–Blue Storm	+ 14' 35"
8	Armand de Las Cuevas (FRA)	Castorama	+ 14' 48"
9	Gianni Bugno (ITA)	Team Polti–Vaporetto	+ 15' 28"
10	Andrew Hampsten (USA)	Motorola	+ 16' 36"

== Stage 21 ==
11 June 1994 — Les Deux Alpes to Sestriere, 121 km (75 mi)

Stage 21 result

Rank	Rider	Team	Time
1	Pascal Richard (SUI)	GB–MG Maglificio	3h 30' 53"
2	Gérard Rué (FRA)	Banesto	+ 1' 00"
3	Michele Coppolillo (ITA)	Navigare–Blue Storm	+ 1' 31"
4	Laurent Madouas (FRA)	Castorama	+ 2' 46"
5	Andrea Chiurato (ITA)	Mapei–CLAS	+ 3' 36"
6	Rolf Sørensen (DEN)	GB–MG Maglificio	+ 4' 27"
7	Claudio Chiappucci (ITA)	Carrera Jeans–Tassoni	s.t.
8	Nelson Rodríguez Serna (COL)	ZG Mobili	+ 4' 30"
9	Gianni Bugno (ITA)	Team Polti–Vaporetto	+ 4' 34"
10	Massimo Podenzana (ITA)	Navigare–Blue Storm	+ 4' 36"

General classification after Stage 21

Rank	Rider	Team	Time
1	Evgeni Berzin (RUS)	Gewiss–Ballan	95h 46' 43"
2	Marco Pantani (ITA)	Carrera Jeans–Tassoni	+ 2' 51"
3	Miguel Induráin (ESP)	Banesto	+ 3' 23"
4	Pavel Tonkov (RUS)	Lampre–Panaria	+ 11' 16"
5	Claudio Chiappucci (ITA)	Carrera Jeans–Tassoni	+ 11' 58"
6	Nelson Rodríguez Serna (COL)	ZG Mobili	+ 13' 17"
7	Massimo Podenzana (ITA)	Navigare–Blue Storm	+ 14' 35"
8	Gianni Bugno (ITA)	Team Polti–Vaporetto	+ 15' 26"
9	Armand de Las Cuevas (FRA)	Castorama	+ 15' 35"
10	Andrew Hampsten (USA)	Motorola	+ 17' 21"

== Stage 22 ==
12 June 1994 — Turin to Milan, 198 km (123 mi)

Stage 22 result

Rank	Rider	Team	Time
1	Stefano Zanini (ITA)	Navigare–Blue Storm	4h 54' 38"
2	Djamolidine Abdoujaparov (UZB)	Team Polti–Vaporetto	s.t.
3	Roberto Pagnin (ITA)	Navigare–Blue Storm	s.t.
4	Giovanni Lombardi (ITA)	Lampre–Panaria	s.t.
5	Fabiano Fontanelli (ITA)	ZG Mobili	s.t.
6	Gianluca Gorini (ITA)	Jolly Componibili–Cage 1994	s.t.
7	Gianluca Bortolami (ITA)	Mapei–CLAS	s.t.
8	Andrea Ferrigato (ITA)	ZG Mobili	s.t.
9	Andrey Teteryuk (KAZ)	Mapei–CLAS	s.t.
10	Claudio Chiappucci (ITA)	Carrera Jeans–Tassoni	s.t.

General classification after Stage 22

Rank	Rider	Team	Time
1	Evgeni Berzin (RUS)	Gewiss–Ballan	100h 41' 21"
2	Marco Pantani (ITA)	Carrera Jeans–Tassoni	+ 2' 51"
3	Miguel Induráin (ESP)	Banesto	+ 3' 23"
4	Pavel Tonkov (RUS)	Lampre–Panaria	+ 11' 16"
5	Claudio Chiappucci (ITA)	Carrera Jeans–Tassoni	+ 11' 52"
6	Nelson Rodríguez Serna (COL)	ZG Mobili	+ 13' 17"
7	Massimo Podenzana (ITA)	Navigare–Blue Storm	+ 14' 35"
8	Gianni Bugno (ITA)	Team Polti–Vaporetto	+ 15' 26"
9	Armand de Las Cuevas (FRA)	Castorama	+ 15' 35"
10	Andrew Hampsten (USA)	Motorola	+ 17' 21"
