= 1996 Amstel Gold Race =

Dutch cycling race

The 1996 Amstel Gold Race was the 31st edition of the annual Amstel Gold Race road bicycle race, held on Sunday April 27, 1996, in the Dutch province of Limburg. The race stretched 253 kilometres, with the start in Heerlen and the finish in Maastricht. There were a total of 192 competitors, with 84 cyclists finishing the race and the first ever Italian winner.

== Results ==
	Cyclist	Team	Time
1	Stefano Zanini (ITA)	Gewiss Playbus	5h 55' 36"
2	Mauro Bettin (ITA)	Refin–Mobilvetta	+ 22"
3	Johan Museeuw (BEL)	Mapei–GB	s.t.
4	Alexander Gontchenkov (UKR)	Roslotto–ZG Mobili	s.t.
5	Fabio Fontanelli (ITA)	MG Maglificio–Technogym	s.t.
6	Andrei Tchmil (UKR)	Lotto	s.t.
7	Emmanuel Magnien (FRA)	Festina–Lotus	s.t.
8	Gianluca Bortolami (ITA)	Mapei–GB	s.t.
9	Jens Heppner (GER)	Team Telekom	s.t.
10	Beat Zberg (SUI)	Carrera Jeans–Tassoni	s.t.
