= 1996 Clásica de San Sebastián =

Race details
- Dates: 10 August 1996
- Stages: 1
- Distance: 234 km (145.4 mi)
- Winning time: 5h 45' 55"

Results
	Winner	Udo Bölts (GER)	(Team Telekom)
	Second	Stefano Cattai (ITA)	(Roslotto–ZG Mobili)
	Third	Massimo Podenzana (ITA)	(Carrera Jeans–Tassoni)

The 1996 Clásica de San Sebastián was the 16th edition of the Clásica de San Sebastián cycle race and was held on 10 August 1996. The race started and finished in San Sebastián. The race was won by Udo Bölts of the Telekom team.

== General classification ==
Final general classification

Rank	Rider	Team	Time
1	Udo Bölts (GER)	Team Telekom	5h 45' 55"
2	Stefano Cattai (ITA)	Roslotto–ZG Mobili	+ 0"
3	Massimo Podenzana (ITA)	Carrera Jeans–Tassoni	+ 0"
4	Richard Virenque (FRA)	Festina–Lotus	+ 0"
5	Marco Fincato (ITA)	Roslotto–ZG Mobili	+ 0"
6	Alberto Elli (ITA)	MG Maglificio–Technogym	+ 0"
7	Fabio Baldato (ITA)	MG Maglificio–Technogym	+ 1' 01"
8	Andrea Ferrigato (ITA)	Roslotto–ZG Mobili	+ 1' 01"
9	Francesco Casagrande (ITA)	Saeco–AS Juvenes San Marino	+ 1' 01"
10	Laurent Jalabert (FRA)	ONCE	+ 1' 01"
