= Giro d'Oro =

Race details
- Date: Late-April
- Region: Trentino, Italy
- English name: Tour of Gold
- Local name(s): Giro d'Oro (in Italian)
- Discipline: Road
- Competition: UCI Europe Tour
- Type: Single-day

History
- First edition: 1983
- Editions: 26
- Final edition: 2008
- First winner: Ezio Moroni (ITA)
- Most wins: Damiano Cunego (ITA) (2 wins)
- Final winner: Gabriele Bosisio (ITA)

The Giro d'Oro was an early season road bicycle race held annually in Trentino, Italy. The race was organised as a 1.1 event on the UCI Europe Tour from 2005 until 2008. It was an important semi classic race in Italy, but was not held in 2009 or after due to organisational problems.

== Winners ==
Year	Country	Rider	Team
1983	Italy	Ezio Moroni	
1984	Italy	Luciano Godio	
1985	Italy	Paolo Dalbianco	
1986	Italy	Pierluigi Berzotelli	
1987	Italy	Federico Longo	
1988	Italy	Stefano Dalla Pozza	
1989	Italy	Igor Tramanin	
1990	Italy	Carlo Benigni	
1991	Italy	Sergio Barbero	
1992	Italy	Fausto Dotti	
1993	Italy	Mauro Bettin	
1994	Italy	Roberto Dal Sie	
1995	Italy	Davide Casarotto	
1996	Italy	Emiliano Murtas	
1997	Italy	Michele Favaron	
1998	Italy	Angelo Citracca	
1999	Czech Republic	Milan Kadlec	
2000	Italy	Alessandro Baronti	
2001	Italy	Oscar Borlini	
2002	Italy	Damiano Cunego	
2003	Belgium	Dave Bruylandts	
2004	Slovenia	Jure Golčer	
2005	Italy	Luca Mazzanti	
2006	Italy	Damiano Cunego	Lampre–Fondital
2007	Lithuania	Dainius Kairelis	Amore & Vita–McDonald's
2008	Italy	Gabriele Bosisio	L.P.R. Brakes
