= Giro della Provincia di Siracusa =

Clyclism competition

Race details
- Date: March
- Region: Province of Syracuse, Sicily, Italy
- Discipline: Road
- Type: One-day race
- Organiser: RCS Sport

History
- First edition: 1998
- Editions: 5
- Final edition: 2002
- First winner: Nicola Minali (ITA)
- Most wins: No repeat winners
- Final winner: Fabio Baldato (ITA)

The Giro della Provincia di Siracusa was a single-day road cycling held annually in the Province of Syracuse in Sicily. Five editions of the race were held, from 1998 to 2002. Reserved for professional cyclists, it was part of the UCI calendar as a class 1.3 race.

== Winners ==
| Year | Winner | Second | Third |
|---|---|---|---|
| 1981 | (Italy) Giuseppe Saronni | | |
| 1982 | (Italy) Wladimiro Panizza | | |
| 1983 | (Italy) Giovanni Mantovani | | |
| 1984 | (Italy) Francesco Moser | | |
| 1985 | (Italy) Francesco Moser | | |
| 1986 | (Italy) Francesco Moser | | |
| 1987 | (Italy) Adriano Baffi | | |
| 1988 | (Italy) Paolo Cimini | | |
| 1989 | (Denmark) Rolf Sörensen | | |
| 1990 | (Italy) Adriano Baffi | | |
| 1991 | (Italy) Mario Cipollini | | |
| 1992 | (Italy) Stefano Colage | | |
| 1994 | (Italy) Stefano Zanini | | |
| 1995 | (Italy) Stefano Colage | | |
| 1996 | (Italy) Fabiano Fontanelli | | |
| 1997 | (Italy) Biagio Conte | | |
| 1998 | (Italy) Nicola Minali | (Italy) Silvio Martinello | (Czech Republic) Ján Svorada |
| 1999 | (Italy) Alessandro Baronti | (Italy) Marco Velo | (Italy) Giuseppe Palumbo |
| 2000 | (Italy) Marco Zanotti | (Italy) Nicola Minali | (Italy) Gabriele Balducci |
| 2001 | (Italy) Mario Cipollini | (Italy) Nicola Minali | (Italy) Marco Zanotti |
| 2002 | (Italy) Fabio Baldato | (Italy) Mario Manzoni | (Ukraine) Mikhaylo Khalilov |
