= 1996 Grand Prix de Suisse =

1996 UCI Road World Cup

Race details
- Dates: 25 August 1996
- Stages: 1
- Distance: 232 km (144.2 mi)
- Winning time: 5h 51' 52"

Results
	Winner	Andrea Ferrigato (ITA)	(Roslotto–ZG Mobili)
	Second	Michele Bartoli (ITA)	(MG Maglificio–Technogym)
	Third	Johan Museeuw (BEL)	(Mapei–GB)

The 1996 Grand Prix de Suisse was the 81st edition of the Züri-Metzgete road cycling one day race. It was held on 25 August 1996 as part of the 1996 UCI Road World Cup. The race took place between the cities of Basel and Zürich was won by Andrea Ferrigato of Italy.

== Result ==
Rank	Rider	Team	Time
1	Andrea Ferrigato (ITA)	Roslotto–ZG Mobili	5h 51' 52"
2	Michele Bartoli (ITA)	MG Maglificio–Technogym	s.t.
3	Johan Museeuw (BEL)	Mapei–GB	s.t.
4	Lance Armstrong (USA)	Motorola	s.t.
5	Francesco Casagrande (ITA)	Saeco–AS Juvenes San Marino	s.t.
6	Alessandro Baronti (ITA)	Panaria–Vinavil	s.t.
7	Frank Vandenbroucke (BEL)	Mapei–GB	s.t.
8	Fabio Baldato (ITA)	MG Maglificio–Technogym	+ 11"
9	Maurizio Fondriest (ITA)	Roslotto–ZG Mobili	s.t.
10	Laurent Jalabert (FRA)	ONCE	s.t.
