= 1996 Japan Cup =

1996 UCI Road World Cup

Race details
- Dates: 27 October 1996
- Stages: 1
- Distance: 179.5 km (111.5 mi)
- Winning time: 4h 31' 01"

Results
	Winner	Mauro Gianetti (SUI)	(Team Polti)
	Second	Pascal Hervé (FRA)	(Festina–Lotus)
	Third	Andrea Peron (ITA)	(Motorola)

The 1996 Japan Cup was the 5th edition of the Japan Cup single-day cycling race. It was held on 27 October 1996, over a distance of 179.5 km, starting and finishing in Utsunomiya. It race was the final event of the 1996 UCI Road World Cup.

The race was won by Mauro Gianetti of Team Polti.

== Results ==
Result
Rank	Rider	Team	Time
1	Mauro Gianetti (SUI)	Team Polti	4h 31' 01"
2	Pascal Hervé (FRA)	Festina–Lotus	+ 23"
3	Andrea Peron (ITA)	Motorola	+ 24"
4	Andrea Tafi (ITA)	Mapei–GB	+ 24"
5	Davide Rebellin (ITA)	Team Polti	+ 24"
6	Daniele Nardello (ITA)	Mapei–GB	+ 32"
7	Fabio Roscioli (ITA)	Refin–Mobilvetta	+ 1' 57"
8	Viatcheslav Ekimov (RUS)	Rabobank	+ 4' 30"
9	Michel Lafis (SWE)	Team Telekom	+ 4' 30"
10	Bobby Julich (USA)	Motorola	+ 4' 42"
