= 1997 GP Ouest-France =

Race details
- Dates: 31 August 1997
- Stages: 1
- Distance: 209 km (129.9 mi)
- Winning time: 4h 58' 32"

Results
	Winner	Andrea Ferrigato (ITA)	(Roslotto–ZG Mobili)
	Second	Sergio Barbero (ITA)	(Mercatone Uno)
	Third	Chris Horner (USA)	(Française des Jeux)

The 1997 GP Ouest-France was the 61st edition of the GP Ouest-France cycle race and was held on 31 August 1997. The race started and finished in Plouay. The race was won by Andrea Ferrigato of the Roslotto team.

== General classification ==
Final general classification

Rank	Rider	Team	Time
1	Andrea Ferrigato (ITA)	Roslotto–ZG Mobili	4h 58' 32"
2	Sergio Barbero (ITA)	Mercatone Uno	+ 0"
3	Chris Horner (USA)	Française des Jeux	+ 2"
4	Laurent Madouas (FRA)	Lotto–Mobistar–Isoglass	+ 5"
5	Alexander Gontchenkov (UKR)	Roslotto–ZG Mobili	+ 46"
6	Richard Virenque (FRA)	Festina–Lotus	+ 46"
7	Stéphane Heulot (FRA)	Française des Jeux	+ 46"
8	Cédric Vasseur (FRA)	GAN	+ 46"
9	Claudio Chiappucci (ITA)	Asics–CGA	+ 1' 00"
10	Nicolas Jalabert (FRA)	Cofidis	+ 2' 13"
