= Nikolay Gorelov =

Personal information
- Born: 23 February 1948 (age 78) Ozhogino, Kaluga Oblast, Russian SFSR, Soviet Union
- Height: 1.70 m (5 ft 7 in)
- Weight: 70 kg (150 lb)

Sport
- Sport: Cycling
- Club: Dynamo Moscow

Nikolay Fyodorovich Gorelov (Russian: Николай Фёдорович Горе́лов; born 23 February 1948) is a Russian cycling coach and former cyclist. He competed at the 1976 Summer Olympics in the individual road race and finished in fifth place.

He won the race of Circuit Cycliste Sarthe in 1973 and finished second in the Peace Race in 1974 in the overall individual classification; he was part of the Soviet team that won the Peace Race in 1972.

After retirement around 1978 he worked as a cycling coach for his native club Dynamo Moscow. Since 1983 he trained the Soviet and later Russian teams. He prepared them for the Summer Olympics of 1992 and 2000 and for the world championships of 1986, 1987, 1990 and 1991. In 1993–1994 he was the head coach at the German club of Freiburg and in 1995–1997 trained the Russian team Roslotto - ZG Mobili.
