= Andrea Ferrigato =

Italian cyclist

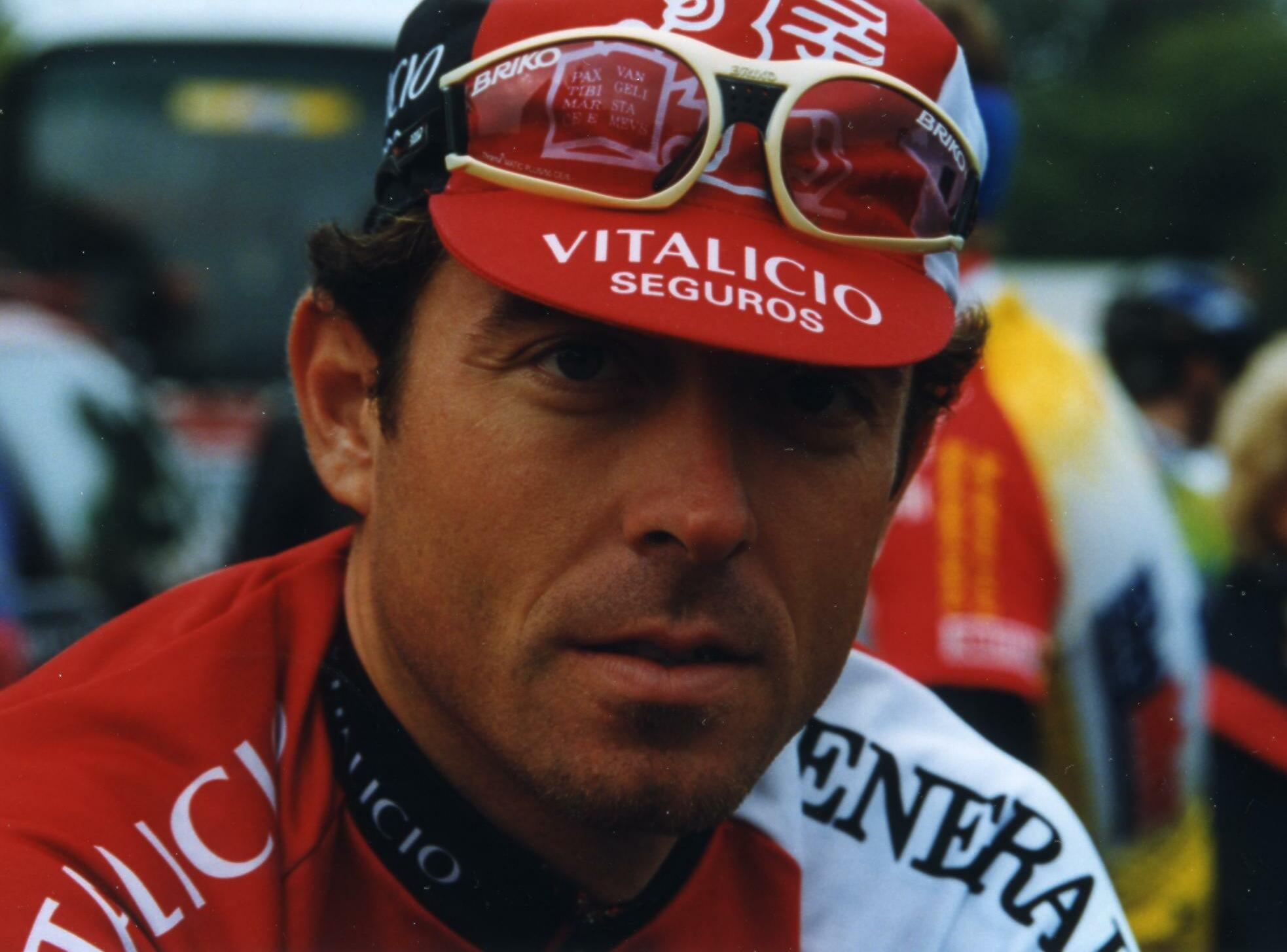

Personal information
- Full name: Andrea Ferrigato
- Born: 1 September 1969 (age 57) Schio, Italy

Cycling career
- Sport: Cycling
- Discipline: Road
- Role: Rider

Amateur team
- 1989–1990: G.S. Car Supermercati

Professional teams
- 1991–1993: Ariostea
- 1994–1995: ZG Mobili
- 1998: Vitalicio Seguros
- 1999: Ballan–Alessio
- 2000: Fassa Bortolo
- 2001–2003: Alessio
- 2004–2005: Acqua & Sapone

Major wins
- Grand Tours Giro d'Italia 1 individual stage (1994) One-day races and Classics Leeds International Classic (1996) Züri-Metzgete (1996) GP Ouest-France (1997)

Andrea Ferrigato (born 1 September 1969 in Schio) is an Italian former road bicycle racer.

== Career ==
In 1991 he turned professional with Ariostea, which he rode for until 1993. In 1994 he won the 12th stage at the Giro d'Italia, while his best year was 1996, while riding for ZG Mobili. That season he won the Leeds International Classic and the Grand Prix de Suisse and placed second to Johan Museeuw in the UCI Road World Cup.

During some years he was in the Italian national team, and competed in two editions of the road world championship. He rode a season for the team Acqua & Sapone, before leaving in March 2005, when he began to work for the company Selle Italia.

Since 2011 he has been working for the tour operator Girolibero, specialized in cycling holidays, where he has been planning roadbike tours and creating the brochure Girolibero Roadbike.

== Major results ==
1990
1st Gran Premio di Poggiana
1st Giro del Casentino
1991
1st Giro della Provincia di Reggio Calabria
8th Gran Premio Città di Camaiore
10th Coppa Sabatini
1992
2nd GP Industria & Commercio di Prato
2nd Trofeo Laigueglia
6th Giro dell'Appennino
8th Tour du Haut Var
1993
2nd Criterium d'Abruzzo
4th Giro dell'Appennino
10th Gran Premio Città di Camaiore
1994
1st Stage 12 Giro d'Italia
3rd GP Industria & Artigianato di Larciano
5th Giro di Toscana
1995
1st GP Industria & Artigianato di Larciano
7th GP Industria & Commercio di Prato
8th Züri-Metzgete
1996
1st Leeds International Classic
1st Züri-Metzgete
1st Giro della Romagna
1st Trofeo Matteotti
2nd Overall UCI Road World Cup
3rd Giro del Lazio
4th Coppa Placci
5th GP Industria & Commercio di Prato
7th Paris–Tours
8th Clásica de San Sebastián
10th GP Eddy Merckx
1997
1st GP Ouest France-Plouay
1st Stage 5 Tirreno–Adriatico
2nd Rochester International Classic
5th Gent–Wevelgem
5th Coppa Bernocchi
5th Paris–Brussels
7th Giro dell'Emilia
7th Trofeo Matteotti
7th Grand Prix de Wallonie
9th Milan–San Remo
9th Gran Premio Città di Camaiore
1998
8th GP Ouest France-Plouay
8th Giro di Romagna
10th Amstel Gold Race
1999
1st Trofeo Pantalica
1st Tour de Berne
1st Stage 2 Four Days of Dunkirk
2nd Trofeo Laigueglia
3rd Trofeo Melinda
3rd Giro del Veneto
4th Giro del Friuli
2000
2nd GP de Fourmies
6th Giro di Romagna
6th Giro del Veneto
7th Trofeo Luis Puig
9th Coppa Placci
2001
1st Overall Volta ao Algarve
2nd Overall Giro della Liguria
8th Clásica de San Sebastián
8th Giro della Provincia di Siracusa
2002
2nd Overall Étoile de Bessèges

1st Stage 2

2nd GP Industria & Commercio di Prato
2nd Coppa Sabatini
4th Grand Prix d'Ouverture La Marseillaise
6th Coppa Placci
6th Giro del Veneto
8th HEW Cyclassics
2003
1st Stage 1 Giro della Liguria
1st Gran Premio Nobili Rubinetterie
2nd Tre Valli Varesine
4th Grand Prix d'Ouverture La Marseillaise
2004
5th G.P. Costa degli Etruschi

=== Grand Tour general classification results timeline ===
Grand Tour	1992	1993	1994	1995	1996	1997	1998	1999	2000	2001	2002	2003	2004
Giro d'Italia	83	—	28	DNF	—	DNF	64	DNF	95	—	—	—	83
Tour de France	—	DNF	—	54	46	—	DNF	—	—	—	—	—	—
Vuelta a España	—	—	—	—	—	—	—	—	—	—	—	—	—

Legend
—	Did not compete
DNF	Did not finish
