= 1996 Paris–Roubaix =

1996 UCI Road World Cup, race 3

Race details
- Dates: April 14, 1996
- Stages: 1
- Distance: 263.5 km (163.7 mi)
- Winning time: 6h 05' 00"

Results
	Winner	Johan Museeuw (BEL)	(Mapei–GB)
	Second	Gianluca Bortolami (ITA)	(Mapei–GB)
	Third	Andrea Tafi (ITA)	(Mapei–GB)

The 94th running of the Paris–Roubaix single-day cycling classic, was held on 14 April 1996. Classics specialist Johan Museeuw won his first Hell of the North classic; his teammates Gianluca Bortolami and Andrea Tafi completed the all-Mapei podium. The race started in Compiègne and finished on the velodrome of Roubaix, covering a distance of 263.5 kilometres (163.7 miles). The race served as the third leg of the 1996 UCI World Cup. Propelled by tailwind, the race had the fastest average speed (43.31 km/h) since Paris–Roubaix was moved to the more difficult easterly route in 1968. It was the 100th anniversary edition of Paris–Roubaix.

== Mapei podium ==
Mapei–GB dominated the race with three riders on the podium. Four Mapei riders – Italians Franco Ballerini, Gianluca Bortolami, Andrea Tafi and Belgian Johan Museeuw – broke clear at 86 km from the finish. Ballerini, the winner of the previous edition, punctured shortly after; his teammates subsequently powering on to Roubaix. Museeuw won the race on the velodrome in Roubaix, without sprinting, before Bortolami and Tafi who completed the all-Mapei podium. All three were riding Colnago C40 bicycles.

With the break 15 km from the finish, Mapei’s managing director, Giorgio Squinzi, called Patrick Lefevere, the team’s directeur sportif, from the company headquarters in Milan. Squinzi instructed Lefevere that Museeuw was to win the race. Despite objections, primarily from Tafi, both Italians accepted the order and Museeuw claimed his first victory in Paris–Roubaix.

== Results ==
14-04-1996: Compiègne–Roubaix, 263.5 km.

Results (1–10)
	Cyclist	Team	Time
1	Johan Museeuw (BEL)	Mapei–GB	6h 38' 10"
2	Gianluca Bortolami (ITA)	Mapei–GB	s.t.
3	Andrea Tafi (ITA)	Mapei–GB	s.t.
4	Stefano Zanini (ITA)	Gewiss Playbus	+ 2' 38"
5	Franco Ballerini (ITA)	Mapei–GB	+ 2' 38"
6	Andrei Tchmil (UKR)	Lotto	+ 5' 27"
7	Brian Holm (DEN)	Team Telekom	+ 5' 27"
8	Viatcheslav Ekimov (RUS)	Rabobank	+ 5' 27"
9	Francis Moreau (FRA)	GAN	+ 5' 27"
10	Marco Milesi (ITA)	Brescialat	+ 5' 27"
