= Ezio Moroni =

Personal information
- Born: 25 December 1961 (age 64) Varese, Italy

Cycling career
- Sport: Cycling
- Current team: Retired
- Discipline: Road
- Role: Rider

Amateur teams
- 1980: Isal Tessari Salotti
- 1981: Monti Guerciotti
- 1982–1984: Passerini Gomme

Professional teams
- 1984–1987: Atala
- 1988: Ariostea–Gres

Major wins
- One-day races and Classics Giro dell'Emilia (1984) GP Industria & Commercio di Prato (1985) Giro di Toscana (1985) Giro di Romagna (1987)

Ezio Moroni (born 25 December 1961) is an Italian former professional road cyclist. In his career, he notably won the Giro dell'Emilia in 1984, the GP Industria & Commercio di Prato and the Giro di Toscana in 1985, as well as the Giro di Romagna in 1987. He also competed in three editions of the Giro d'Italia.

== Major results ==
1979
7th Road race, UCI Junior Road World Championships
1982
1st Trofeo Gianfranco Bianchin
1983
1st Giro d'Oro
1st GP Palio del Recioto
1st Stage 2 Giro Ciclistico d'Italia
1st Stages 4a & 6 Settimana Ciclistica Lombarda
1st Stage 1 Giro delle Regioni
1984
1st Giro dell'Emilia
1st Stage 4 Settimana Ciclistica Lombarda
2nd Giro del Veneto
1985
1st Giro di Toscana
1st GP Industria & Commercio di Prato
5th Coppa Sabatini
6th Overall Settimana Internazionale Coppi e Bartali
7th Gran Premio Città di Camaiore
1986
3rd Giro del Veneto
6th Nice–Alassio
9th Giro dell'Etna
1987
1st Giro di Romagna
3rd Overall Giro di Puglia
7th Trofeo Laigueglia
8th Overall Giro del Trentino
