= Gran Premio Industria e Commercio di Prato =

Italian one-day road cycling race

Race details
- Date: Mid September
- Region: Tuscany, Italy
- Local name(s): Gran Premio Industria e Commercio di Prato (in Italian)
- Discipline: Road
- Competition: UCI Europe Tour
- Type: Single-day
- Web site: www.ciclisticapratese.com

History
- First edition: 1946
- Editions: 70 (as of 2015)
- First winner: Nedo Logli (ITA)
- Most wins: Michele Dancelli (ITA) (3 wins)
- Most recent: Daniele Bennati (ITA)

The Gran Premio Industria e Commercio di Prato is a single-day road bicycle race held annually in Prato, Italy. Since 2005, the race has been organised as a 1.1 event on the UCI Europe Tour.

== Winners ==
| Year | Country | Rider | Team |
|---|---|---|---|
| 1946 | Italy | Nedo Logli | Welter–Ursus |
| 1947 | Italy | Sergio Maggini | Benotto–Superga |
| 1948 | Italy | Giulio Bresci | Wilier Triestina |
| 1949 | Italy | Luciano Maggini | Wilier Triestina |
| 1950 | Switzerland | Ferdinand Kübler | Fréjus–Superga |
| 1951 | Italy | Arrigo Padovan | Atala–Pirelli |
| 1952 | Italy | Luciano Maggini | Atala–Pirelli |
| 1953 | Italy | Rino Benedetti | Legnano–Pirelli |
| 1954 | Italy | Danilo Barozzi | Atala–Pirelli |
| 1955 | Italy | Aldo Moser | Torpado–Ursus |
| 1956 | Italy | Danilo Barozzi | Atala–Pirelli |
| 1957 | Italy | Silvano Ciampi | Faema–Guerra |
| 1958 | Italy | Ercole Baldini | Legnano |
| 1959 | Italy | Giuseppe Fallarini | Ignis–Fréjus |
| 1960 | Italy | Alfredo Sabbadin | Philco |
| 1961 | Belgium | Gilbert Desmet | Carpano |
| 1962 | Italy | Bruno Mealli | Bianchi |
| 1963 | Italy | Vendramino Bariviera | Carpano |
| 1964 | Italy | Michele Dancelli | Molteni |
| 1965 | Italy | Michele Dancelli | Molteni |
| 1966 | Italy | Italo Zilioli | Sanson |
| 1967 | Italy | Michele Dancelli | Vittadello |
| 1968 | Italy | Adriano Durante | Max Meyer |
| 1969 | Italy | Alberto Della Torre | Filotex |
| 1970 | Italy | Marcello Bergamo | Filotex |
| 1971 | Italy | Franco Bitossi | Filotex |
| 1972 | Italy | Costantino Conti | Ferretti |
| 1973 | Italy | Fabrizio Fabbri | Magniflex |
| 1974 | Italy | Fabrizio Fabbri | Sammontana |
| 1975 | Italy | Costantino Conti | Furzi–F.T. |
| 1976 | Italy | Walter Riccomi | Scic |
| 1977 | Italy | Claudio Bortolotto | Sanson |
| 1978 | Sweden | Bernt Johansson | Fiorella–Mocassini |
| 1979 | Sweden | Bernt Johansson | Magniflex–Famcucine |
| 1980 | Italy | Silvano Contini | Bianchi–Piaggio |
| 1981 | Italy | Moreno Argentin | Sammontana–Benotto |
| 1982 | Italy | Moreno Argentin | Sammontana–Benotto |
| 1983 | Italy | Luciano Rabottini | Metauro Mobili–Pinarello |
| 1984 | Italy | Pierino Gavazzi | Atala–Campagnolo |
| 1985 | Italy | Ezio Moroni | Atala–Campagnolo |
| 1986 | Austria | Harald Maier | Supermercati Brianzoli–Essebi |
| 1987 | Italy | Daniele Caroli | Ecoflam–BFB |
| 1988 | Italy | Maurizio Fondriest | Alfa Lum–Legnano–Ecoflam |
| 1989 | Italy | Pierino Gavazzi | Polli–Mobiexport |
| 1990 | Switzerland | Stephan Joho | Ariostea |
| 1991 | Italy | Enrico Galleschi | Gis Gelati–Ballan |
| 1992 | Venezuela | Léonardo Sierra | ZG Mobili–Selle Italia |
| 1993 | Italy | Massimo Podenzana | Navigare–Blue Storm |
| 1994 | Italy | Marco Saligari | GB–MG Maglificio |
| 1995 | Italy | Fabrizio Bontempi | Brescialat–Fago |
| 1996 | Italy | Fabrizio Guidi | Scrigno–Blue Storm |
| 1997 | Italy | Mariano Piccoli | Brescialat–Oyster |
| 1998 | Switzerland | Felice Puttini | Ros Mary–Amica Chips |
| 1999 | Italy | Alessandro Baronti | Cantina Tollo–Alexia Alluminio |
| 2000 | Italy | Sergio Barbero | Lampre–Daikin |
| 2001 | Italy | Davide Rebellin | Liquigas–Pata |
| 2002 | Ukraine | Vladimir Duma | Ceramiche Panaria–Fiordo |
| 2003 | Italy | Davide Rebellin | Gerolsteiner |
| 2004 | Belgium | Nick Nuyens | Quick-Step–Davitamon |
| 2005 | Brazil | Murilo Fischer | Naturino–Sapore di Mare |
| 2006 | Italy | Daniele Bennati | Lampre–Fondital |
| 2007 | Italy | Filippo Pozzato | Liquigas |
| 2008 | Ukraine | Mikhaylo Khalilov | Ceramica Flaminia–Bossini Docce |
| 2009 | Italy | Giovanni Visconti | ISD–NERI |
| 2010 | Italy | Diego Ulissi | Lampre–Farnese Vini |
| 2011 | Slovakia | Peter Sagan | Liquigas–Cannondale |
| 2012 | Italy | Emanuele Sella | Androni Giocattoli–Venezuela |
| 2013 | Italy | Gianfranco Zilioli | Androni Giocattoli–Venezuela |
| 2014 | Italy | Sonny Colbrelli | Italy national cycling team |
| 2015 | Italy | Daniele Bennati | Italy national cycling team |
