= Mario Manzoni =

Italian cyclist

Personal information
- Born: 14 July 1969 (age 57) Almenno San Bartolomeo, Italy

Cycling career
- Sport: Cycling
- Current team: Global 6 United
- Discipline: Road
- Role: Rider (retired); Directeur sportif

Professional teams
- 1991–1993: Chateau d'Ax–Gatorade
- 1994–1995: Brescialat–Ceramiche Refin
- 1996–1997: Roslotto–ZG Mobili
- 1998–2000: Mobilvetta Design–Northwave
- 2001–2002: Alexia Alluminio
- 2003: Mercatone Uno–Scanavino
- 2004: Formaggi Pinzolo Fiavè

Managerial teams
- 2005–2006: Androni Giocattoli–3C Casalinghi
- 2007–2008: Team LPR
- 2012: Team Idea
- 2013: Leopard–Trek Continental Team
- 2014: Androni Giocattoli–Venezuela
- 2015–2019: Nippo–Vini Fantini
- 2020: Bardiani–CSF–Faizanè
- 2021–: Global 6 Cycling

Mario Manzoni (born 14 July 1969) is an Italian former professional racing cyclist, who rode in nine editions of the Giro d'Italia, winning one stage in 1997. He now works as a directeur sportif for UCI Continental team Global 6 United.

== Major results ==
1988
1st Piccolo Giro di Lombardia
1991
3rd GP Industria Artigianato e Commercio Carnaghese
5th Gran Premio Città di Camaiore
6th Giro di Romagna
1992
1st Trofeo Masferrer
3rd Circuito de Getxo
1994
1st Stage 3 Tirreno–Adriatico
1995
7th Omloop Het Volk
9th GP du canton d'Argovie
1996
1st Stage 2 Tour de Romandie
1997
1st Stage 8 Giro d'Italia
1998
1st Stage 3 Giro del Trentino
2nd GP Industria & Artigianato di Larciano
3rd Cholet-Pays de Loire
5th Giro della Provincia di Siracusa
8th Giro di Toscana
1999
6th Coppa Bernocchi
9th Giro di Romagna
2000
10th Criterium d'Abruzzo
2001
8th Giro della Provincia di Siracusa
2002
2nd G.P. Costa degli Etruschi
5th Trofeo dell'Etna
10th Milan–San Remo
2003
3rd Trofeo dell'Etna
