= Marco Gilli =

Italian electrical engineer

Marco Gilli is an Italian electrical engineer. He was named a fellow of the Institute of Electrical and Electronics Engineers, "for contributions to stability properties and global dynamic behaviorin cellular nonlinear networks".

In 1998, Gilli was awarded the Ravani Prize by the Academy of Sciences of Turin.
