= Sergio Barbero =

Italian cyclist

Personal information
- Full name: Sergio Barbero
- Born: 17 January 1969 (age 57) Sala Biellese, Italy

Cycling career
- Sport: Cycling
- Discipline: Road
- Role: Rider

Professional teams
- 1993–1994: Navigare–Blue Storm
- 1995–1996: Carrera Jeans–Tassoni
- 1997–1999: Mercatone Uno
- 2000–2004: Lampre–Daikin
- 2005: Naturino–Sapore di Mare
- 2006–2007: Selle Italia–Diquigiovanni

Sergio Barbero (born 17 January 1969) is an Italian former racing cyclist.

== Doping ==
Barbero tested positive for EPO at the 2001 Tour de Romandie and was subsequently handed a six-month ban.

== Major results ==
1991
1st Giro d'Oro
1st GP Industrie del Marmo
1992
3rd GP Capodarco
10th Coppa Placci
1993
4th Milano–Torino
1997
1st Giro di Toscana
2nd Overall Giro di Puglia

1st Stage 4

2nd GP Ouest–France
2nd Giro dell'Emilia
8th Trofeo Pantalica
1999
1st Japan Cup
1st Tre Valli Varesine
1st Giro del Lazio
1st Trofeo dello Scalatore
2nd Züri-Metzgete
2nd Coppa Placci
3rd Giro del Piemonte
6th GP Industria & Commercio di Prato
6th Giro dell'Emilia
2000
1st GP Industria & Commercio di Prato
1st Stage 2 Giro del Trentino
2nd Giro di Toscana
2nd GP Industria & Artigianato Larciano
2nd Giro del Lazio
3rd Coppa Sabatini
6th Coppa Placci
7th Giro del Veneto
7th Luk-Cup Bühl
2001
2nd Trofeo Pantalica
4th Rund um den Henninger Turm
2002
1st Japan Cup
9th Giro di Toscana
2003
1st Japan Cup
1st Coppa Bernocchi
3rd Giro del Friuli
4th Giro del Lazio
8th Trofeo Laigueglia
2004
6th GP Industria & Commercio di Prato
9th GP Ouest–France
2005
4th Giro d'Oro
6th GP Industria & Artigianato Larciano
7th Overall Regio-Tour
2006
6th Coppa Ugo Agostoni
10th Overall Vuelta Ciclista Por Un Chile Lider
10th Tre Valli Varesine

=== Grand Tour general classification results timeline ===
Grand Tour	1994	1995	1996	1997	1998	1999	2000	2001	2002	2003	2004	2005	2006
Giro d'Italia	—	75	58	43	—	—	73	DNF	66	58	—	—	DNF
Tour de France	—	DNF	—	—	DNF	124	—	—	—	—	—	—	—
Vuelta a España	DNF	—	—	—	—	—	—	—	—	—	—	—	—

Legend
—	Did not compete
DNF	Did not finish
