= Stefano Cattai =

Italian cyclist

Personal information
- Born: 29 November 1967 (age 58) Portogruaro, Italy

Cycling career
- Sport: Cycling
- Current team: Retired
- Discipline: Road
- Role: Rider

Professional teams
- 1990–1994: Jolly Componibili–Club 88
- 1995–1997: ZG Mobili
- 1998: Ballan
- 1999: Team Polti
- 2000–2001: Liquigas–Pata

Stefano Cattai (born 29 November 1967 in Portogruaro) is a former Italian cyclist.

== Major results ==
1989
1st Milano-Rapallo
3rd Girobio
1996
2nd Clásica de San Sebastián
1998
2nd Trofeo Matteotti
