= Alessandro Baronti =

Italian cyclist

Personal information
- Born: 4 June 1967 (age 59) Florence, Italy

Cycling career
- Sport: Cycling
- Current team: Retired
- Discipline: Road
- Role: Rider

Amateur teams
- 1986: Magniflex–Centroscarpa
- 1988: Magniflex–Coalca–Texcar
- 1989: Filati Alessandra
- 1992: Bottegone
- 1994: Giusti per l'edilizia-Bottegone

Professional teams
- 1993: Navigare–Blue Storm (stagiaire)
- 1995–1996: Lampre–Panaria
- 1997: Asics–CGA
- 1998–2000: Cantina Tollo–Alexia Alluminio
- 2001: LA Alumínios–Pecol–Calbrita–Casprini–Águias de Alpiarça

Major wins
- Grand Tours Giro d'Italia 1 individual stage (1997) One-day races and Classics Roma Maxima (1997)

Alessandro Baronti (born 4 June 1967) is an Italian former professional racing cyclist. He rode in two editions of the Giro d'Italia and the Tour de France, notably winning a stage of the 1997 Giro d'Italia. He also won the Roma Maxima the same year.

== Major results ==
1988
5th Gran Premio della Liberazione
1991
3rd GP Industrie del Marmo
1993
1st GP Industrie del Marmo
4th Gran Premio della Liberazione
1994
1st Circuito Belvedere
2nd GP Industrie del Marmo
1996
3nd Giro della Provincia di reggio Calabria
3rd Gran Premio Città di Camaiore
5th Firenze–Pistoia
6th Grand Prix de Suisse
9th Coppa Bernocchi
9th Giro dell'Etna
1997
1st Roma Maxima
1st Stage 15 Giro d'Italia
3rd Coppa Placci
3rd Memorial Gastone Nencini
4th Giro di Romagna
1998
2nd Trofeo Melinda
9th Giro di Toscana
1999
1st GP Industria & Commercio di Prato
1st Giro della Provincia di Siracusa
2000
1st Giro d'Oro

=== Grand Tour general classification results timeline ===
Grand Tour	1996	1997	1998	1999
Giro d'Italia	—	70	DNF	—
Tour de France	112	—	—	138
Vuelta a España	—	—	—	—

Legend
—	Did not compete
DNF	Did not finish
