= Stefano Colagè =

Italian cyclist

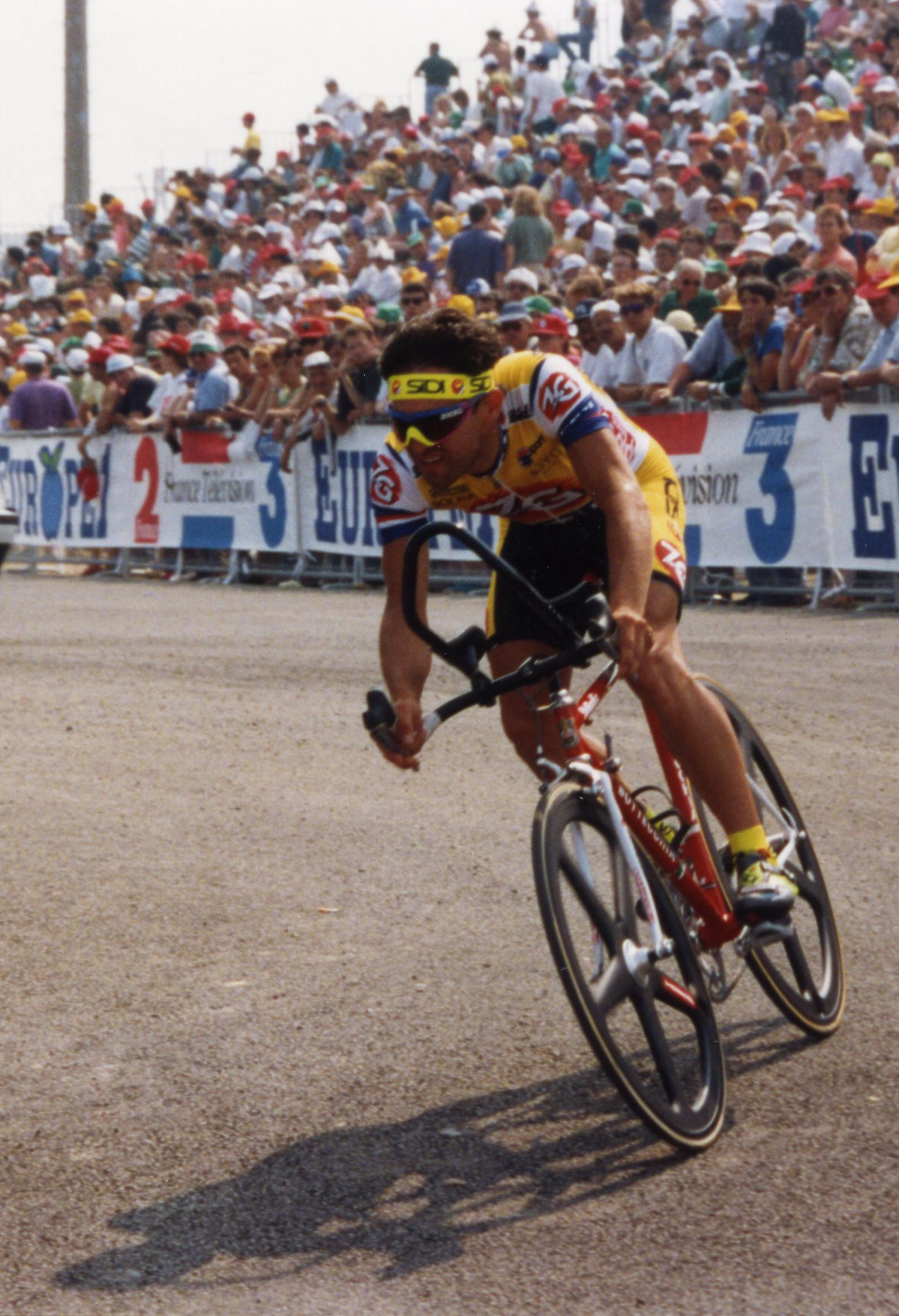
- Colagè at the 1993 Tour de France

Personal information
- Born: 8 July 1962 (age 64) Canino, Italy

Cycling career
- Sport: Cycling
- Current team: Retired
- Discipline: Road
- Role: Rider

Professional teams
- 1985–1987: Dromedario–Laminox–Fibok
- 1988–1989: Alba Cucine–Benotto
- 1990: Jolly Componibili–Club 88
- 1991–1995: ZG Mobili–Bottecchia
- 1996–1997: Refin–Mobilvetta
- 1998: Cantina Tollo–Alexia Alluminio

Major wins
- Tirreno–Adriatico (1995); Gran Premio di Lugano (1995)

Stefano Colagè (born 8 July 1962) is an Italian former professional road cyclist. He competed in eight editions of the Giro d'Italia, four editions of the Tour de France and one of the Vuelta a España. He also competed in the individual road race event at the 1984 Summer Olympics. His most notable victories were the 1995 Tirreno–Adriatico and the 1995 Gran Premio di Lugano.

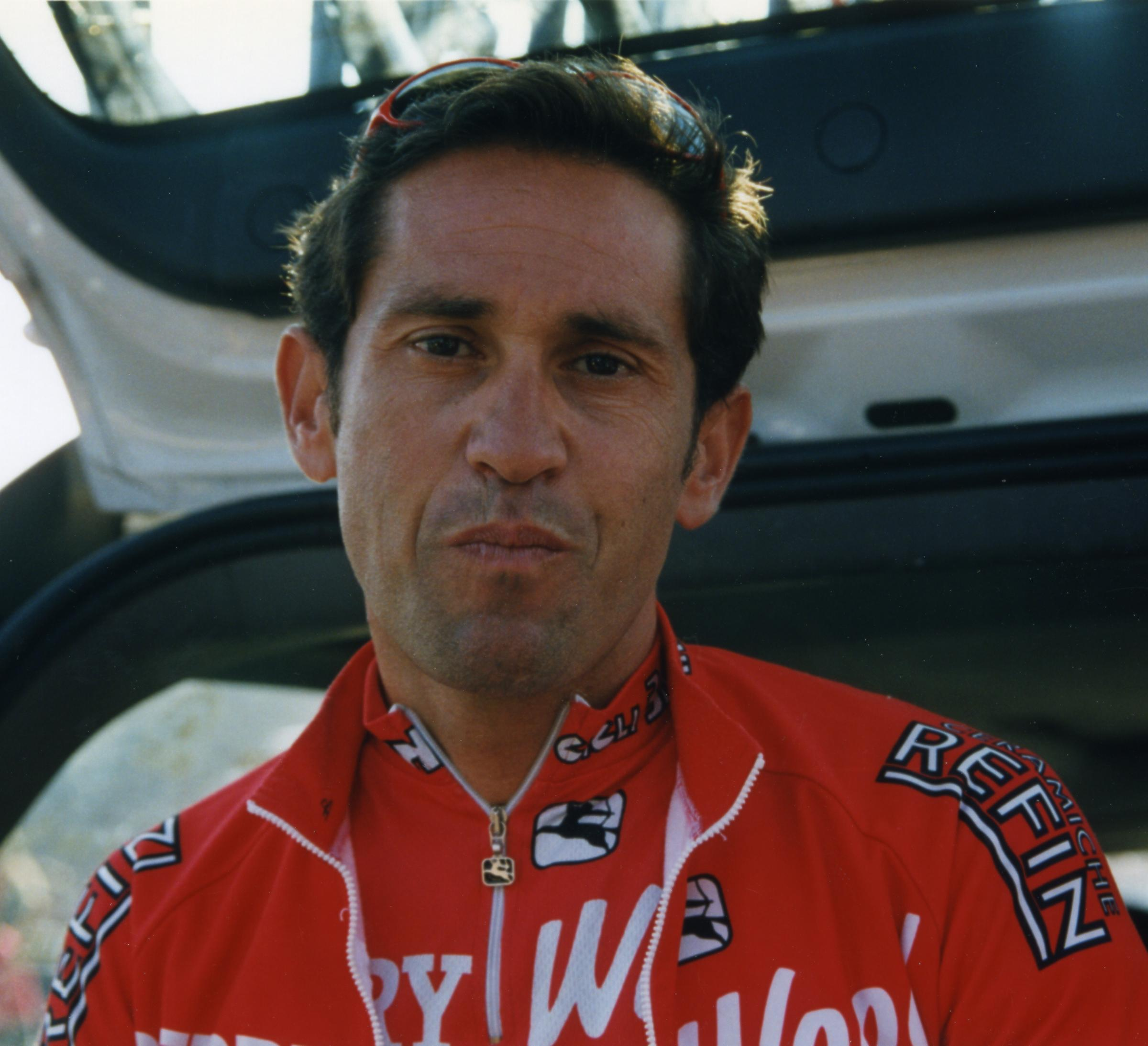

== Major results ==
1984
3rd Overall Girobio
3rd Overall Coors Classic
1985
2nd Road race, National Road Championships
2nd Giro del Veneto
3rd Gran Premio Città di Camaiore
3rd Milano–Vignola
1986
1st Giro dell'Umbria
1987
1st Memorial Nencini
2nd GP Industria & Artigianato di Larciano
1988
2nd Giro dell'Appennino
2nd GP Industria & Artigianato di Larciano
3rd Giro del Friuli
1989
1st Giro dell'Umbria
3rd Coppa Bernocchi
1990
2nd Giro di Puglia
2nd Giro di Campania
1991
1st Stage 10 Tour de Suisse
2nd Coppa Sabatini
1992
1st Coppa Agostoni
1st Stage 2 Tirreno–Adriatico
1st Giro dell'Etna
2nd Trofeo Pantalica
2nd GP Industria & Artigianato di Larciano
1993
1st Stage 1 Vuelta al Táchira
1994
3rd Overall Tirreno–Adriatico
1995
1st Overall Tirreno–Adriatico

1st Stage 4

1st Gran Premio di Lugano
1st Giro dell'Etna
1st Trofeo Pantalica
3rd Coppa Sabatini
3rd Tre Valli Varesine
1996
1st Criterium d'Abruzzo
3rd Giro di Puglia
1997
3rd Criterium d'Abruzzo
3rd Clásica de San Sebastián
1998
1st Trofeo Pantalica
3rd Giro del Piemonte

=== Grand Tour general classification results timeline ===
Grand Tour	1985	1986	1987	1988	1989	1990	1991	1992	1993	1994	1995	1996	1997
Giro d'Italia	DNF	13	DNF	DNF	—	DNF	DNF	DNF	87	—	—	—	—
Tour de France	—	—	—	—	—	—	—	—	60	DNF	106	DNF	—
Vuelta a España	—	—	—	DNF	79	—	—	—	—	—	—	—	53

Legend
—	Did not compete
DNF	Did not finish
