= Fabio Roscioli =

Italian cyclist

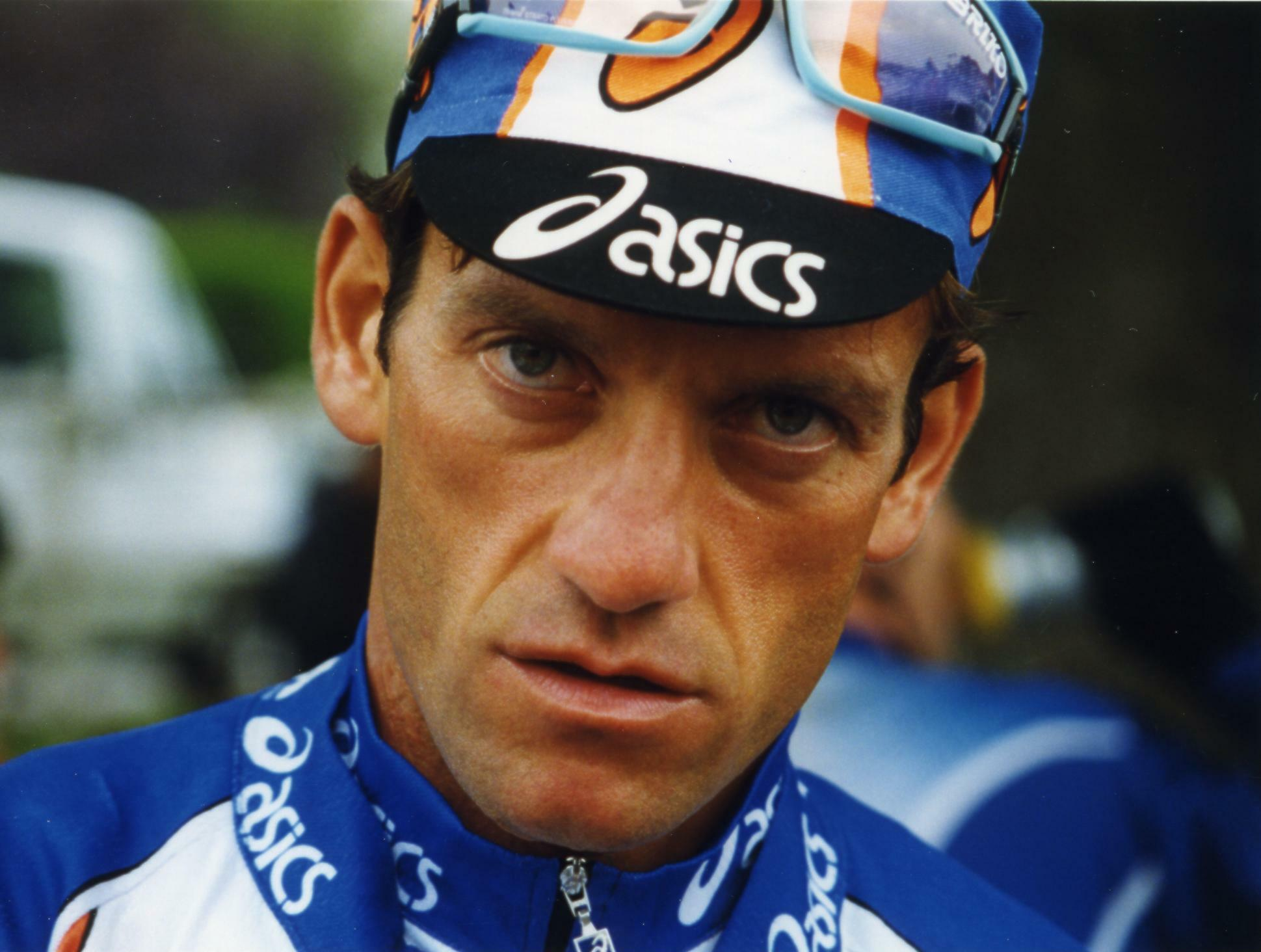

Personal information
- Full name: Fabio Roscioli
- Born: 18 July 1965 (age 61) Grottammare, Italy

Cycling career
- Sport: Cycling
- Discipline: Road
- Role: Rider

Professional teams
- 1987–1989: Ariostea–Gres
- 1990–1991: Del Tongo
- 1992–1993: Carrera Jeans–Vagabond
- 1994: Brescialat–Ceramiche Refin
- 1995–1996: Refin
- 1997–1998: Asics–CGA
- 1999: Amica Chips–Costa de Almeria
- 2000–2001: Jazztel–Costa de Almería

Major wins
- Grand Tours Tour de France 1 individual stage (1993) Vuelta a España 1 individual stage (1999) Stage races Three Days of De Panne (1994)

Fabio Roscioli (born 18 July 1965 in Grottammare) is an Italian former professional road bicycle racer. In 1993, he won the 12th stage of the Tour de France.

== Major results ==
1986
1st Gran Premio San Giuseppe
1988
4th Milan–San Remo
1990
2nd E3 Prijs Vlaanderen
1992
1st Overall (TTT) Cronostaffetta
1993
1st Stage 12 Tour de France
2nd Coppa Bernocchi
3rd Gran Premio Città di Camaiore
4th Coppa Ugo Agostoni
6th Tre Valli Varesine
8th Overall Herald Sun Tour
1994
1st Overall Three Days of De Panne
1st Stage 9 Tour de Suisse
3rd Gran Premio Città di Rio Saliceto e Correggio
4th Overall Settimana Internazionale di Coppi e Bartali

1st Stage 4

9th Gent–Wevelgem
9th Trofeo Pantalica
1995
6th Nokere Koerse
9th Overall Ronde van Nederland
1996
1st Milano–Vignola
1st GP d'Europe
2nd Firenze–Pistoia
4th Giro del Piemonte
5th Coppa Sabatini
6th Trofeo Melinda
7th Japan Cup
8th Brabantse Pijl
9th Giro di Romagna
10th Dwars door België
1997
1st Overall Hofbrau Cup
1999
1st Stage 14 Vuelta a España
1st Stage 6 Vuelta a Asturias
