= Fausto Dotti =

Italian cyclist

Personal information
- Born: 7 June 1968 (age 58) Brescia, Italy

Cycling career
- Sport: Cycling
- Role: Rider

Fausto Dotti (born 7 June 1968) is an Italian former professional racing cyclist. He rode in one edition of the Tour de France, four editions of the Giro d'Italia and one edition of the Vuelta a España.
