= Marco Milesi =

Italian cyclist

Personal information
- Full name: Marco Milesi
- Born: 30 January 1970 (age 56) Osio Sotto, Italy

Cycling career
- Sport: Cycling
- Current team: Retired
- Discipline: Road
- Role: Rider

Professional teams
- 1994–1999: Brescialat–Ceramiche Refin
- 2000: Vini Caldirola–Sidermec
- 2001–2002: Domo–Farm Frites–Latexco
- 2003–2004: Vini Caldirola–So.di
- 2005–2006: Liquigas–Bianchi

Marco Milesi (born 30 January 1970) is a former Italian racing cyclist, who rode professionally between 1994 and 2006. Before that, he finished in second place in the Girobio in 1993. He started six times in a grand Tour (three times in the Tour de France, two times in the Giro d'Italia and once in the Vuelta a España), but did not achieve notable successes. His best result in a classic race was the 10th place in 1996 Paris–Roubaix.
