= Marco Fincato =

Italian cyclist (born 1970)

Personal information
- Born: 6 October 1970 (age 56) Padua, Italy
- Height: 1.76 m (5 ft 9 1/2 in)
- Weight: 70 kg (154 lb; 11 st 0 lb)

Cycling career
- Sport: Cycling
- Current team: Retired
- Discipline: Road
- Role: Rider

Professional teams
- 1996–1997: Roslotto–ZG Mobili
- 1998–1999: Mercatone Uno–Bianchi
- 2000–2001: Fassa Bortolo
- 2002: Mercatone Uno

Marco Fincato (born 6 October 1970) is a former Italian professional cyclist. He participated in 3 Tours de France and 2 Giro d'Italia.

== Major results ==
1995
1st GP Industria e Commercio di San Vendemiano
1st Giro della Regione Friuli Venezia Giulia
5th Cycling World Championships Amateur Men's Road Race
1996
1st Firenze–Pistoia
1st Memorial Nencini
2nd Giro del Lazio
2nd Subida a Urkiola
3rd Volta a Catalunya
5th Clásica de San Sebastián
5th Tour de France stage 11
1998
3rd Giro del Lazio
1999
5th GP de Fourmies
2000
1st Tour de Suisse stage 7
4th Tour de Suisse stage 3
