= Fabiano Fontanelli =

Italian cyclist

Personal information
- Full name: Fabiano Fontanelli
- Born: 24 April 1965 (age 61) Faenza, Italy
- Height: 1.76 m (5 ft 9 1/2 in)
- Weight: 68 kg (150 lb; 10 st 10 lb)

Cycling career
- Sport: Cycling
- Discipline: Road
- Role: Rider

Amateur teams
- 1985: Stracciari Trasporti
- 1986–1988: Lambrusco Giacobazzi

Professional teams
- 1989–1993: Selca
- 1994–1995: ZG Mobili
- 1996–1997: MG Maglificio–Technogym
- 1998–2003: Mercatone Uno–Bianchi

Managerial team
- 2006–2008: Ceramica Panaria–Navigare

Major wins
- Grand Tours Giro d'Italia 4 individual stages (1993, 1996, 1997, 1998)

Fabiano Fontanelli (born 24 April 1965 in Faenza) is an Italian former road bicycle racer. Professional from 1989 to 2003, he notably won four stages of the Giro d'Italia.

== Major results ==
1990
2nd Giro di Romagna
1991
1st Overall Giro di Puglia

1st Stage 1

1993
1st Stage 11 Giro d'Italia
1st Stage 5 Tour de Pologne
1st Giro della Provincia di Reggio Calabria
1994
Clásico RCN

1st Prologue & Stage 1

1st Stage 1 Vuelta a los Valles Mineros
8th Milan–San Remo
1995
1st Stage 5 Tour de Luxembourg
1st Grand Prix Pino Cerami
6th Milan–San Remo
1996
1st Stage 12 Giro d'Italia
1st Stage 3 Tirreno–Adriatico
1st Stage 2 Giro del Trentino
1st Stage 3 Tour Méditerranéen
1st Grand Prix d'Ouverture La Marseillaise
1st Trofeo Pantalica
1st Giro dell'Etna
1997
Tour de Langkawi

1st Stages 11 & 12

1st Stage 16 Giro d'Italia
1998
1st Stage 16 Giro d'Italia
1999
1st Stage 5a Setmana Catalana de Ciclisme
1st Paris–Camembert
9th Rund um den Henninger Turm
10th GP de Denain Porte du Hainaut
2000
1st Stage 5 Settimana Internazionale di Coppi e Bartali
6th Clásica de Almería
10th Veenendaal–Veenendaal
2001
1st Stage 2 Vuelta a Asturias
2002
1st Overall Giro della Provincia di Lucca

1st Stage 1

1st GP Citta di Rio Saliceto e Correggio
2nd Giro di Romagna
4th Giro del Lazio
4th GP Industria & Commercio di Prato
4th Giro dell'Emilia
5th Coppa Sabatini
7th Gran Premio Bruno Beghelli
10th GP Città di Camaiore
2003
3rd GP Industria & Artigianato Larciano
