= Refin–Mobilvetta =

Refin-Mobilvetta
Team information
- UCI code: REF
- Registered: Italy
- Founded: 1995
- Disbanded: 1997
- Discipline: Road
- Status: Retired
- Bicycles: Battaglin

Key personnel
- General manager: Primo Franchini

Team name history
- 1995–1996 1996–1997: Refin–Cantina Tollo; Refin–Mobilvetta

Refin–Mobilvetta (UCI code: REF), previously known as Brescialat-Ceramiche Refin and Refin-Cantina Tollo, was an Italian-based road bicycle racing team active from 1995 to 1997.
From 1995 to 1997 the main sponsor was Ceramiche Refin, a ceramics company headquartered in Salvaterra (Casalgrande).

== History ==
=== Refin–Cantina Tollo ===
The team began life in 1995 under the name of Refin–Cantina Tollo, set up by the manager Primo Franchini, who left the Brescialat–Ceramiche Refin team to found a new team, taking with him four cyclists from Brescialat (Felice Puttini, Fabio Roscioli, Roberto Pelliconi and Heinz Imboden).
In its first year, the team took part in the Giro d'Italia, where Heinz Imboden came 8th in the overall ranking.

=== Refin–Mobilvetta ===
In 1996, Refin–Mobilvetta signed up Djamolidine Abdoujaparov in the hope of winning a significant number of races thanks to his skills as a sprint cyclist, together with the talents of Andreas Kappes, already on the team.
After a good year in 1996, the team registered for the Tour de France, during which it won the 15th stage thanks to Abdoujaparov.
In 1997, new members Stefano Colagè and Marco Lietti completed a very young team, which took part for the last time in the Giro d'Italia and the Vuelta a España.
At the end of the year, the Refin sponsor pulled out, and founded Mobilvetta Design; it could not be seen as a continuation of the preceding team, because it had other team leaders, another bicycle and the only cyclist Luigi Della Bianca .

== Notable riders ==
- Johan Capiot
- Jo Planckaert
- Heinz Imboden
- Felice Puttini
- Andreas Kappes
- Tobias Steinhauser
- Djamolidine Abdoujaparov
- Serguei Uslamine
- Asiat Saitov
- Flavio Giupponi
- Rodolfo Massi
- Leonardo Piepoli
- Stefano Colagè
- Luca Mazzanti
- Fabio Roscioli
- Marco Lietti
- Mauro Bettin
