= Mauro Bettin =

Italian cyclist

Personal information
- Born: 21 December 1968 (age 57) Miane, Italy

Cycling career
- Sport: Cycling
- Role: Rider

Mauro Bettin (born 21 December 1968) is an Italian former professional racing cyclist. He rode in two editions of the Tour de France, three editions of the Giro d'Italia and one edition of the Vuelta a España.
