= ZG Mobili =

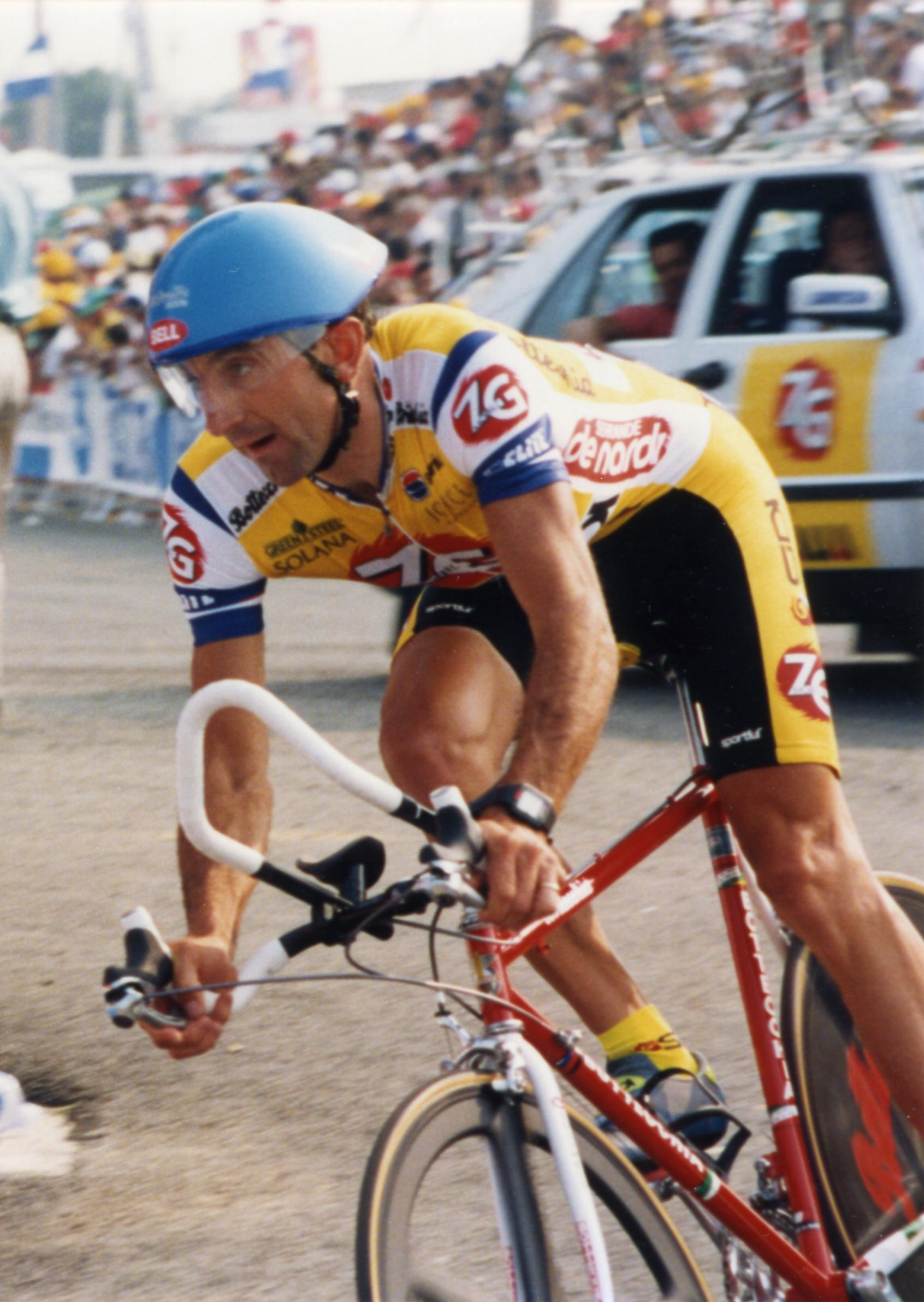
- Giancarlo Perini at the 1993 Tour de France

Team information
- UCI code: ZGM, MOB, ROS
- Registered: Italy
- Founded: 1991
- Disbanded: 1997
- Discipline: Road
- Bicycles: Bottecchia

Team name history
- 1991 1992 1993–1994 1995 1996–1997: ZG Mobili–Bottecchia; ZG Mobili–Selle Italia; ZG Mobili; ZG Mobili–Selle Italia; Roslotto–ZG Mobili

ZG Mobili was an Italian cycling team that existed from 1991 to 1997.

== Sponsors and naming rights ==
- 1991 ZG Mobili-Bottecchia
- 1992 ZG Mobili-Selle Italia
- 1993-1994 ZG Mobili
- 1995 ZG Mobili-Selle Italia
- 1996-1997 Roslotto-ZG Mobili

== History ==
Under the Roslotto (Russian: Русское лото) sponsorship, the main shareholder was the National Sports Fund of Russia (NSF) (Russian: Национальный фонд спорта (НФС)), which was created by Minister of Sports Shamil Tarpishchev (Russian: Шамиль Тарпичев), who was a friend and tennis coach for Boris Yeltsin. His successor at the head of the NSF, Boris Fyodorov, also transliterated as Boris Fedorov (Russian: Борис Федоров), publicly alleged Tarpichev of links with the mafia, including Alimzhan Tokhtakhunov (Taiwanchik) and the Izmailovskaya OPG and, later, Alexander Litvinenko alleged Tarpichev of links with illicit activities. Under the Russian sponsor Roslotto (Russian: Рослото) from 1996 to 1997, millions of dollars allegedly were money laundered from Russia and into Italy and the European banking system using the Roslotto-ZG Mobili cycling team as a front.

== Notable riders ==
- Massimo Ghirotto
- Gianni Faresin
- Stefano Colagè
- Hendrik Redant
- Fabiano Fontanelli
- Fabio Casartelli
- Andrea Ferrigato
- Maurizio Fondriest
- Alexander Gontchenkov
- Paolo Savoldelli
- Dimitri Konyshev
- Giancarlo Perini
- Piotr Ugrumov
- Viatcheslav Djavanian
- Dimitri Sedun
- Alexei Sivakov
- Youri Sourkov
- Nelson Rodríguez
- Nikolay Gorelov
- Vitali Kokorine
