= Mario Cipollini =

Italian cyclist

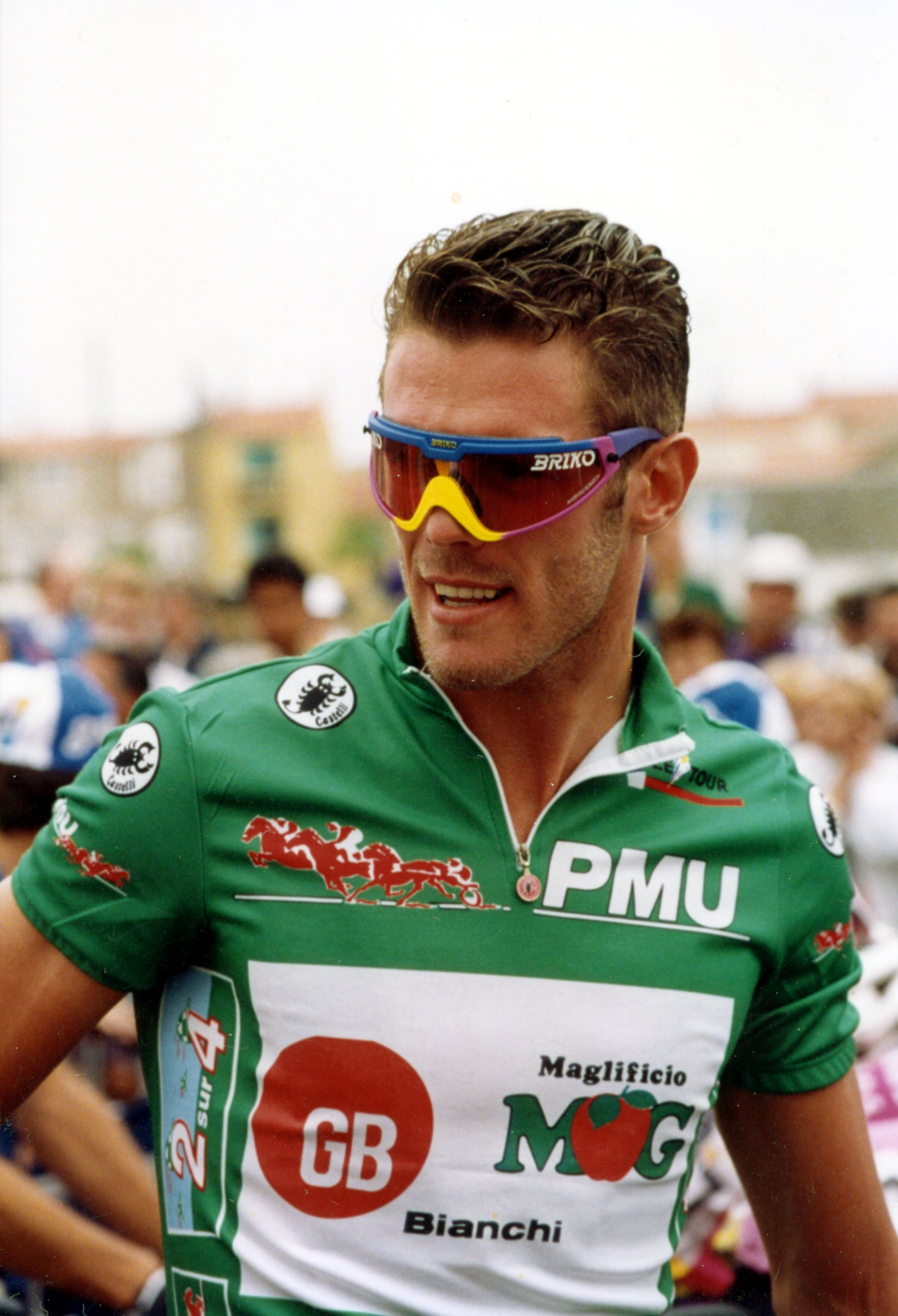
- Cipollini at the 1993 Tour de France

Personal information
- Full name: Mario Cipollini
- Nicknames: Il Re Leone (The Lion King); Super Mario; Cipo; Mooie Mario (Pretty Mario); Mousselini
- Born: 22 March 1967 (age 59) Lucca, Italy
- Height: 1.89 m (6 ft 2 1/2 in)
- Weight: 76 kg (168 lb; 12 st 0 lb)

Cycling career
- Sport: Cycling
- Discipline: Road
- Role: Rider
- Rider type: Sprinter

Professional teams
- 1989–1991: Del Tongo
- 1992–1993: GB-MG
- 1994–1995: Mercatone Uno–Medeghini
- 1996–2001: Saeco–AS Juvenes San Marino
- 2002: Acqua & Sapone–Cantina Tollo
- 2003–2004: Domina Vacanze
- 2005: Liquigas–Bianchi
- 2008: Rock Racing

Major wins
- Grand Tours Tour de France 12 individual stages (1993, 1995–1999) 1 TTT stage (1993) Giro d'Italia Points classification (1992, 1997, 2002) 42 individual stages (1989–1992, 1995–2003) Vuelta a España 3 individual stages (2002) One-day races and Classics World Road Race Championships (2002) National Road Race Championships (1996) Milan–San Remo (2002) Gent–Wevelgem (1992, 1993, 2002) E3 Prijs Vlaanderen (1993) Scheldeprijs (1991, 1993) Other Vélo d'Or (2002)
Medal record
Representing Italy
Men's road bicycle racing
UCI Road World Championships
Gold medal – first place	2002 Zolder/Hasselt	Road race

Mario Cipollini (Italian pronunciation: [ˈmaːrjo tʃipolˈliːni]; born 22 March 1967), often abbreviated to Cipo, is a retired Italian professional road cyclist most noted for his sprinting ability, the longevity of his dominance (his first pro win came in 1988, his last in 2005; 170 professional wins, 192 including criteriums), and his colourful personality. His nicknames include Il Re Leone (The Lion King) and Super Mario. He is regarded as having been the best sprinter of his generation.

His career highlights include the Road World Championships and Milan–San Remo in 2002, and 42 stages in the Giro d'Italia. He also won 12 stages in the Tour de France and three stages in the Vuelta a España.

== Career ==
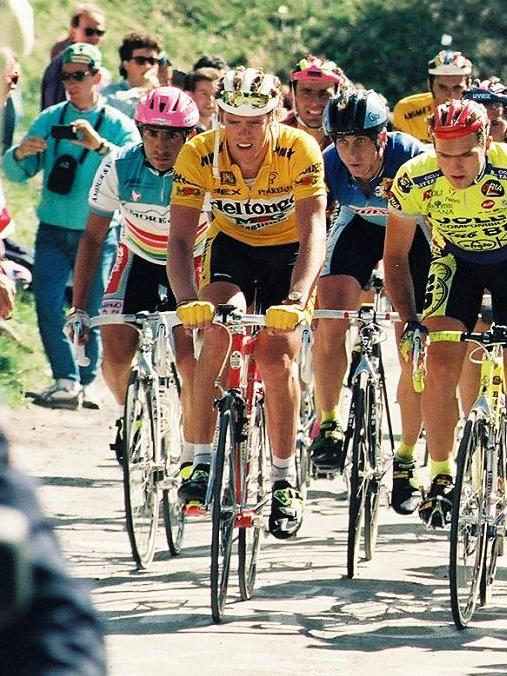
Cipollini (center) climbing during the 1991 Giro d'Italia

Cipollini was born in San Giusto di Compito, surrounded by the mountains of Capannori south of Lucca, Tuscany. He came from a cycling family – his father, Vivaldo, had been a successful amateur racer in his youth, whilst his brother Cesare had raced as a professional and his sister Tiziana had also competed as a cyclist. Mario was a prolific winner in his youth career, scoring a total of 125 victories in age-group and amateur races before joining the professional peloton in 1989.

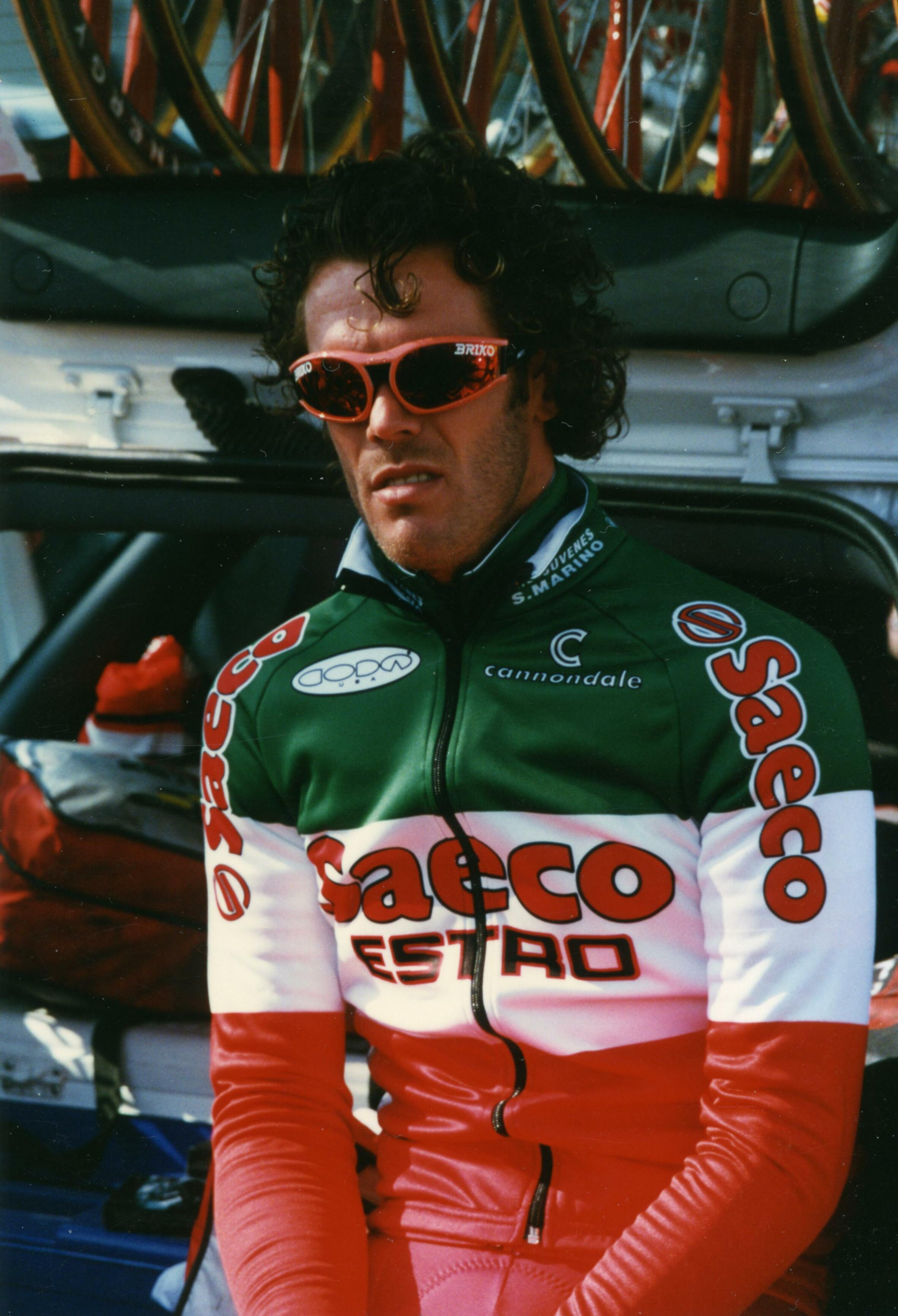
Cipollini at the 1997 Paris–Nice

In the 1999 Tour de France, he led the peloton on the fastest stage in the history of the Tour, averaging more than 50 km/h over 194.5 km. In the same Tour, he won 4 stages in a row, setting the post-World War II record for consecutive stage wins. He has also found success in Belgium, winning Gent–Wevelgem in 1992, 1993 and 2002 (record).

At the peak of his career, Cipollini's speed was unrivalled, and he is credited with being the first rider with a sprint train. The red jerseys of his Saeco team, featuring team-mates such as Paolo Fornaciari, Giuseppe Calcaterra, Gian Matteo Fagnini and Mario Scirea, were commonly seen at the front of the peloton toward the end of the flat Grand Tour stages in the late 1990s. The train kept the pace high in the closing kilometres, to dissuade opposing riders from attacking and to ensure that in the final 200–300 metres, Cipollini was the only cyclist able to maintain the speed. This changed the way teams approached mass sprints and bred a new generation of sprinters, such as fellow Italian Alessandro Petacchi.

The beginning of 2002 saw Cipollini win Milan–San Remo with his new Acqua-Sapone–Cantina Tollo team, and later Gent–Wevelgem. However, a falling-out with the organisers of the Tour de France made him announce his retirement. Italian national coach Franco Ballerini convinced him to return to competition, and built the Italian national team around Cipollini for the 2002 UCI Road World Championships. Cipollini won the rainbow jersey in a sprint finish in Zolder, Belgium.

In the 2003 Giro d'Italia, Cipollini focused on Alfredo Binda's record 41 Giro stage wins while in the world champion's jersey. His attempt was almost derailed by Alessandro Petacchi of the Fassa Bortolo team. After many failed attempts, he finally broke the record, although he had to abandon the next stage due to injuries in a crash on a rain-soaked finish. He said that the crash ended his career. His team, Domina Vacanze–Elitron, was left out of the Tour de France that year, prompting a comment from Cipollini that the organisers disrespected the rainbow jersey.

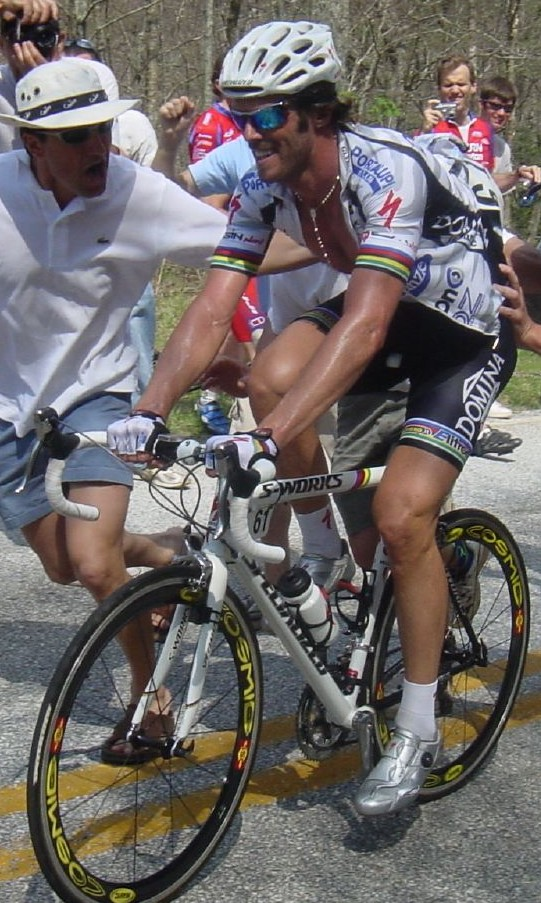
Cipollini climbing during the 2004 Tour de Georgia

When he retired from the 2004 Giro due to another crash, it was the only time he entered the Giro without winning a single stage.

In 2008, he returned to competitive cycling with the Rock Racing team at the Tour of California.

=== Retirement ===
In February 2013, news surfaced that Cipollini could have been a client of doctor Eufemiano Fuentes from 2001 to 2004. A report published by Italian newspaper Gazzetta dello Sport alleged that Cipollini's codename was "Maria" and that he received various doping products, including injecting 25 blood bags from the beginning of 2003 to the start of the Giro d'Italia in May. Cipollini's lawyer stated that the claims were false when the story was revealed on 9 February 2013.

After having vowed to retire several times in his career, usually in a public fit of pique, Cipollini finally made good on his promise on 26 April 2005, one week before the start of the 2005 Giro. His swan song was to participate in a ceremonial prologue of the Giro wearing a fluorescent pink skin suit, which listed his 42-stage wins.

Cipollini emerged from retirement in early 2008 with Rock Racing. His first race back was the 2008 Tour of California, and he finished third on stage 2. On the eve of the Milan–San Remo, he announced that he would retire again, citing disagreements over his leadership role on Rock Racing.

== Controversies ==
Cipollini made no secret that he did not like climbing stages, and while he completed all stages of the Giro on many occasions, he infuriated purists by not attempting mountain stages at the Tour or Vuelta. While this was a common practice with sprinters without points jersey aspirations to save themselves for the rest of the season, Cipollini's practice of releasing photos of himself lounging at the beach while the others struggled in the mountains earned him a reputation in this regard.

Cipollini also became famous for extravagant clothing, especially racing uniforms, sporting custom-made skin suits. Some of his memorable kits include a muscle suit, zebra, and tiger prints, and a techno-skinsuit inspired by the 1982 film Tron. Off the course, Cipollini and his Saeco squad dressed as ancient Romans during a rest day at the 1999 Tour de France, to celebrate Julius Caesar's birthday and to commemorate Cipollini's record fourth consecutive Tour de France stage win. He was fined for wearing an all-yellow outfit while leading the Tour de France; this practice to wear more yellow and even have a yellow bike has since become generally accepted.

These antics violated UCI regulations, which resulted in Cipollini and his team being fined thousands of Swiss francs. The muscle suit fetched 100 million lira (US$43,710) in a charity auction, nearly 100 times the fine. Some organisers, especially Jean-Marie Leblanc of the Tour de France, took offence at his hijinks, and he wasn't invited to race in the Tour from 2000 to 2003, despite being the world champion in 2003.

Cipollini was kicked out of the 2000 Vuelta a España after he punched Vitalicio Seguros rider Francisco Cerezo to the ground before the start of a stage. Later in 2003, he drew the ire of the organisers of the Vuelta a España when he quit after the prologue time trial. His team had been invited to compete with the condition that Cipollini participated. He said he was recovering from an injury and should not have been forced to race in the first place.

His name was on the list of doping tests published by the French Senate on 24 July 2013 that were collected during the 1998 Tour de France and found positive for EPO when retested in 2004.

In June 2022, and following allegations of domestic violence and stalking, the public prosecutor of Lucca demanded a two and half years of prison sentence for Cipollini. In October 2022, Cipollini was sentenced by the Lucca court to a suspended 3 years in prison and to compensate the civil party for 85 thousand euros.

== Personal life ==
Cipollini's powerful performances sometimes risked being eclipsed by his flamboyant manner and lifestyle. His height, looks and mane of hair earned him the nickname "Lion King", and he adopted other names, including "Super Mario" and "Mario the Magnificent". His wardrobe consisted of hundreds of suits, ties and shoes, many of which he never wore. In 2002, he was arrested for speeding on an Italian autostrada. He commented that it was the only place where he could safely get up to top speed for training. He responded to criticisms by claiming that he helped generate coverage for his sponsors and that it was all part of his showmanship.

Cipollini married Sabrina Landucci in 1993. The couple separated in 2005. Despite being married through much of his career, Cipollini was regarded as a sex symbol and rumoured to be a womaniser. He did little to dispel these notions with comments such as, "If I weren't a professional cyclist, I'd be a porn star".

Daniel Coyle's book Lance Armstrong's War says Cipollini's profile was little more than a decoy. The intent was that competitors would find themselves distracted by the constant media coverage of Cipollini and demoralised by the impression that he could party all night and beat them the next morning.

Despite this boisterous public image, Cipollini could often be quite humble regarding his fellow cyclists. After breaking Alfredo Binda's record for Giro stage wins, he remarked he would have been happy "just to polish [Binda's] shoes". Reacting to the 2004 death of Marco Pantani, Cipollini said, "I am devastated. It's a tragedy of enormous proportions for everyone involved in cycling. I'm lost for words."

In 2010, Cipollini started his own brand of bicycles, which were used by the Italian ISD–NERI team.

On 18 November 2025, Cipollini underwent heart surgery at the arrhythmology and cardiology department of Torrette hospital in Ancona. Initial signs were that the operation had gone well.

== Major results ==
1987
1st Overall Regio-Tour
1988
1st Trofeo Città di Castelfidardo
2nd Gran Premio della Liberazione
1989
1st Stage 12 Giro d'Italia
Giro di Puglia

1st Stages 3, 4 & 5

1990
1st Milano–Vignola
Giro d'Italia

1st Stages 13 & 20

Giro di Puglia

1st Stages 2 & 5

1st Stage 4a Three Days of De Panne
1991
1st Scheldeprijs
1st Giro dell'Etna
Giro d'Italia

1st Stages 3, 7 & 21

Giro di Puglia

1st Stages 2 & 4

Étoile de Bessèges

1st Stages 1 & 3

Settimana Internazionale di Coppi e Bartali

1st Stages 4 & 5

2nd Gent–Wevelgem
8th E3 Prijs Vlaanderen
1992
1st Gent–Wevelgem
Giro d'Italia

1st Points classification
1st Stages 4, 7, 16 & 20

Paris–Nice

1st Stages 1, 2 & 4

Four Days of Dunkirk

1st Points classification
1st Stages 1, 3 & 7

Giro di Puglia

1st Stages 1 & 3

1st Stage 2 Three Days of De Panne
1st Stage 2 Étoile de Bessèges
9th Grand Prix d'Ouverture La Marseillaise
1993
1st Gent–Wevelgem
1st E3 Prijs Vlaanderen
1st Scheldeprijs
1st Memorial Rik Van Steenbergen
Tour de France

1st Stages 1 & 4 (TTT)
Held after Stages 4 & 6
Held after Stages 1 & 7–10

Paris–Nice

1st Stages 1, 4 & 5

Tour Méditerranéen

1st Stages 4 & 5

6th Omloop Het Volk
10th Milan–San Remo
1994
Paris–Nice

1st Stages 1 & 6

Tour Méditerranéen

1st Stages 5 & 6

1st Stage 5 Settimana Internazionale di Coppi e Bartali
2nd Milan–San Remo
4th Paris–Tours
4th Firenze–Pistoia
1995
1st Trofeo Luis Puig
1st Monte Carlo–Alassio
Tour de France

1st Stages 2 & 4
Held after Stages 4 & 5

Giro d'Italia

1st Stages 1 & 3
Held after Stage 1
Held after Stages 1 & 3–9

Volta a Catalunya

1st Stages 2, 3 & 5

Tour de Romandie

1st Stages 2 & 6

Volta a la Comunitat Valenciana

1st Stages 4 & 5

Tour Méditerranéen

1st Stages 3, 4 & 5

4th Gent–Wevelgem
1996
1st Road race, National Road Championships
1st Stage 2 Tour de France
Giro d'Italia

1st Stages 4, 8, 11 & 18

Tour de Romandie

1st Stages 3, 5 & 7

Volta a Catalunya

1st Stages 2 & 5

Volta a la Comunitat Valenciana

1st Stages 2 & 5a

Vuelta a Aragón

1st Points classification
1st Stages 3 & 5

1st Stage 4 Tour Méditerranéen
7th Milan–San Remo
10th Telekom Grand Prix (with Mario Scirea)
1997
Tour de France

1st Stages 1 & 2
Held after Stages 1–4
Held after Stages 1 & 2

Giro d'Italia

1st Points classification
1st Stages 1, 2, 4, 10 & 22
Held after Stages 1 & 2

Tour de Romandie

1st Stages 2, 3 & 5

Vuelta a Aragón

1st Stages 2 & 4a

Tour Méditerranéen

1st Stages 1 & 2

1st Stage 1 Volta a la Comunitat Valenciana
1998
1st Gran Premio della Costa Etruschi
Tour de France

1st Stages 5 & 6

Giro d'Italia

1st Stages 5, 7, 8 & 10

Volta a Catalunya

1st Stages 1a, 2, 3 & 4

1st Stage 3 Tour Méditerranéen
1999
1st Trofeo Luis Puig
1st Trofeo Manacor
1st Trofeo Sóller
1st Peperbus Profspektakel
Tour de France

1st Stages 4, 5, 6 & 7

Giro d'Italia

1st Stages 2, 10, 12 & 17
Held after Stage 2

Volta a Catalunya

1st Stages 1 & 2

1st Stage 3 Tirreno–Adriatico
1st Stage 5 Tour de Romandie
2000
1st Gran Premio della Costa Etruschi
Giro d'Italia

1st Stage 4
Held after Stage 1
Held after Stage 4
Held after Stage 1

Tour de Romandie

1st Points classification
1st Stages 1 & 5

1st Stage 5a Volta a la Comunitat Valenciana
1st Stage 6 Tour Méditerranéen
2001
1st Giro della Provincia di Siracusa
Giro d'Italia

1st Stages 6, 9, 19 & 21
1st Azzurri d'Italia classification

Vuelta a Aragón

1st Stages 1 & 5

1st Stage 5 Tour de Romandie
1st Stage 4 Giro del Trentino
2nd Milan–San Remo
2002
1st Road race, UCI Road World Championships
1st Milan–San Remo
1st Gent–Wevelgem
Giro d'Italia

1st Points classification
1st Stages 1, 3, 9, 15, 18 & 20
1st Azzurri d'Italia classification
Held after Stage 1
Held after Stage 1

Vuelta a España

1st Stages 3, 4 & 7

1st Stage 7 Tirreno–Adriatico
1st Stage 2 Tour Méditerranéen
4th Trofeo Luis Puig
9th Tour of Flanders
2003
Giro d'Italia

1st Stages 8 & 9
Held after Stage 2

Tirreno–Adriatico

1st Stages 1 & 3

4th Milan–San Remo
2004
1st Stage 4 Tour Méditerranéen
1st Stage 2 Tour de Georgia
2005
1st Giro della Provincia di Lucca
1st Stage 4 Tour of Qatar
5th International Grand Prix Doha

=== Grand Tour general classification results timeline ===
Grand Tour	1989	1990	1991	1992	1993	1994	1995	1996	1997	1998	1999	2000	2001	2002	2003	2004
Giro d'Italia	DNF	142	124	126	—	—	DNF	DNF	89	DNF	DNF	DNF	107	100	DNF	DNF
Tour de France	—	—	—	DNF	DNF	—	DNF	DNF	DNF	DNF	DNF	—	—	—	—	DNF
/ Vuelta a España	—	—	—	—	—	DNF	—	—	DNF	—	—	DNF	—	DNF	DNF	—

=== Classics results timeline ===
Monument	1990	1991	1992	1993	1994	1995	1996	1997	1998	1999	2000	2001	2002	2003	2004	2005
Milan–San Remo	—	14	41	10	2	27	7	108	81	99	43	2	1	4	109	36
Tour of Flanders	—	31	54	45	—	24	31	—	—	—	—	69	9	DNF	—	—
Paris–Roubaix	—	34	69	—	—	—	—	—	—	—	—	—	—	—	—	—
Liège–Bastogne–Liège	Did not contest during his career															
Giro di Lombardia	Did not contest during his career															
Classic	1990	1991	1992	1993	1994	1995	1996	1997	1998	1999	2000	2001	2002	2003	2004	2005
Omloop Het Volk	—	—	—	6	—	—	—	—	—	—	—	—	—	—	—	—
Dwars door Vlaanderen	—	—	—	21	—	—	—	—	—	—	—	—	—	—	—	—
E3 Harelbeke	—	8	29	1	35	21	—	—	—	—	—	—	—	—	—	—
Gent–Wevelgem	33	2	1	1	96	4	—	59	26	35	—	—	1	DSQ	—	—
Scheldeprijs	—	1	—	1	—	17	—	—	—	—	—	—	—	—	—	—

Legend
—	Did not compete
DNF	Did not finish
DSQ	Disqualified
