= 2000 Gent–Wevelgem =

Race details
- Dates: 5 April 2000
- Stages: 1
- Distance: 208 km (129 mi)
- Winning time: 5h 01' 03"

Results
	Winner	Geert Van Bondt (BEL)	(Farm Frites)
	Second	Peter Van Petegem (BEL)	(Farm Frites)
	Third	Johan Museeuw (BEL)	(Mapei–Quick-Step)

The 62nd edition of the Belgian Gent–Wevelgem cycling classic race was held over 208 kilometres from Gent to Wevelgem on Wednesday 5 April 2000. There were 194 competitors, of whom 47 finished. The race was won by Belgium's Geert Van Bondt of the Farm Frites team.

== Final classification ==
Rank	Rider	Team	Time
1	Geert Van Bondt (BEL)	Farm Frites	5h 01' 03"
2	Peter Van Petegem (BEL)	Farm Frites	+ 28"
3	Johan Museeuw (BEL)	Mapei–Quick-Step	+ 28"
4	Tristan Hoffman (NED)	Memory Card–Jack & Jones	+ 28"
5	Chris Peers (BEL)	Cofidis	+ 28"
6	Michel Vanhaecke (BEL)	Tönissteiner–Colnago	+ 28"
7	Andreas Klier (GER)	Farm Frites	+ 28"
8	Peter Farazijn (BEL)	Cofidis	+ 28"
9	Steffen Wesemann (GER)	Team Telekom	+ 1' 03"
10	Roger Hammond (GBR)	Collstrop–De Federale Verzekeringen	+ 1' 03"
