= Edwin Bafcop =

Belgian cyclist (born 1962)

Personal information
- Full name: Edwin Bafcop
- Born: 24 December 1962 (age 63) Poperinge, Belgium

Cycling career
- Sport: Cycling
- Current team: Retired
- Discipline: Road
- Role: Rider

Professional teams
- 1986: Fangio–Lois–Mavic
- 1987–1989: Hitachi–Marc
- 1990–1991: Isoglass–Garden Wood
- 1992: Assur Carpets-Naessens
- 1993: Trident–Schick–Gilals–Wimi

Edwin Bafcop (born 24 December 1962 in Poperinge) is a Belgium former professional road bicycle racer.

== Major results ==
1984
2nd Ghent–Wevelgem U23
1986
10th Grand Prix de Fourmies
1987
7th Grand Prix de Rennes
1988
1st Grand Prix de Fourmies
2nd Kampioenschap van Vlaanderen
8th Halle–Ingooigem
1989
2nd Circuito de Getxo
3rd Cholet-Pays de la Loire
4th Omloop van de Westhoek
9th GP Stad Zottegem
1990
1st GP de la Ville de Rennes
6th Giro dell'Etna
8th Cholet-Pays de la Loire
10th Memorial Samyn
1991
2nd Tour de Vendée
3rd Omloop van de Westhoek
10th Scheldeprijs
1992
9th Circuit des Frontières

=== Grand Tour general classification results timeline ===
Grand Tour	1986	1987	1988	1989	1990
Vuelta a España	DNF	—	—	—	DNF
Giro d'Italia	—	—	—	—	—
Tour de France	—	—	—	—	—

Legend
—	Did not compete
DNF	Did not finish
