= Soudal Quick-Step =

Belgian cycling team

Team information
- UCI code: SOQ
- Registered: Belgium
- Founded: 2003
- Discipline: Road
- Status: UCI WorldTeam
- Bicycles: Specialized
- Components: Shimano
- Website: Team home page

Key personnel
- General manager: Jurgen Foré
- Team managers: Davide Bramati; Iljo Keisse; Klaas Lodewyck; Wilfried Peeters; Tom Steels; Geert Van Bondt; Dries Devenyns; Kevin Hulsmans

Team name history
2003–2004	Quick-Step–Davitamon (QSD)
2005–2007	Quick-Step–Innergetic (QSI)
2008–2011	Quick-Step (QST)
2012–2014	Omega Pharma–Quick-Step (OPQ)
2015–2016	Etixx–Quick-Step (EQS)
2017–2018	Quick-Step Floors (QST)
2019–2021	Deceuninck–Quick-Step (DQT)
2022	Quick-Step Alpha Vinyl Team (QST)
2023–	Soudal–Quick-Step (SOQ)
Soudal Quick-Step jersey
Jersey

Soudal–Quick-Step (UCI team code: SOQ) is a Belgian UCI WorldTeam cycling team led by team manager Jurgen Foré. The directeurs sportifs are Davide Bramati, Iljo Keisse, Klaas Lodewyck, Wilfried Peeters, Tom Steels, Geert Van Bondt, Dries Devenyns and Kevin Hulsmans.

The team is nicknamed 'The Wolfpack' and has used the term in its branding since 2017.

== History ==
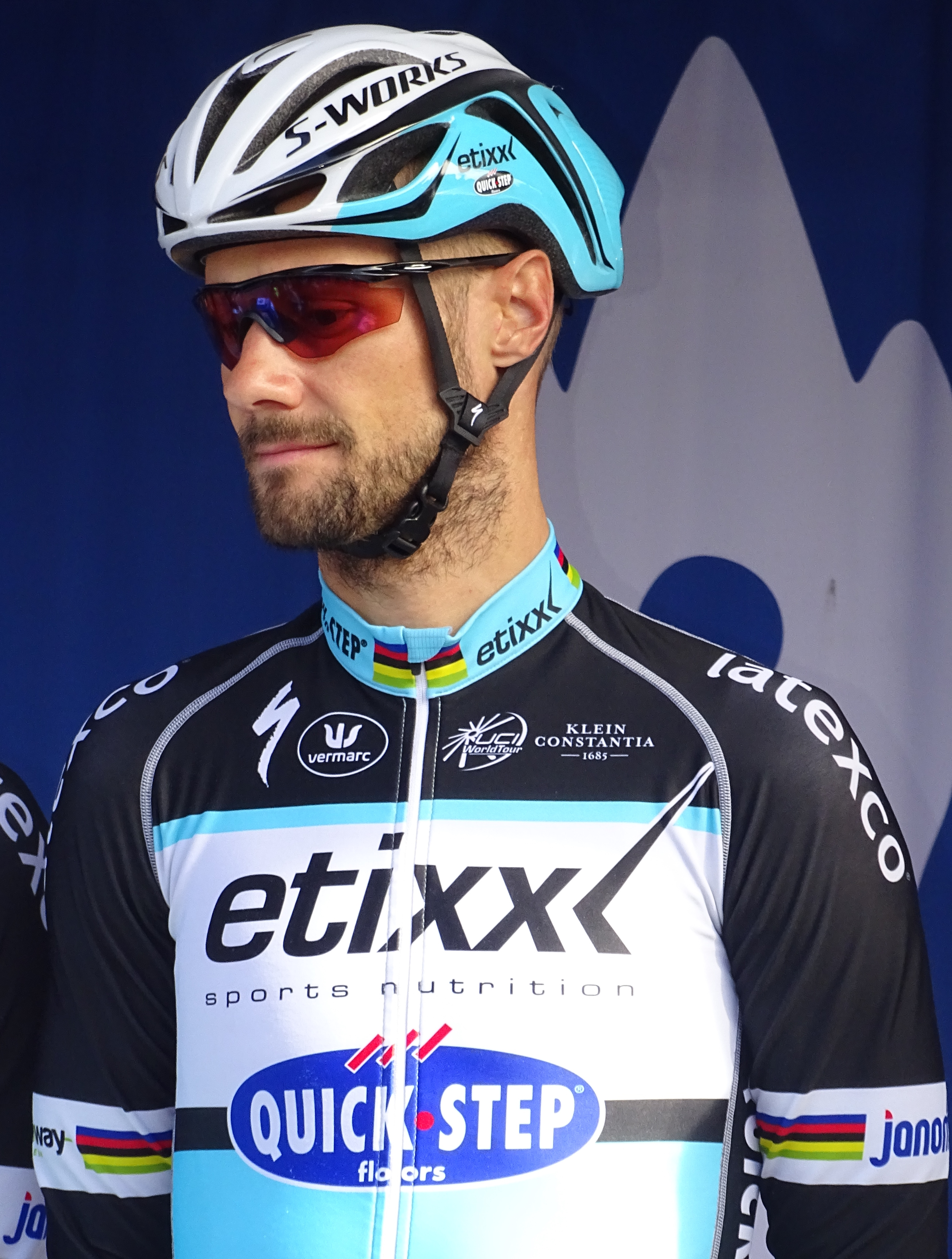
Tom Boonen (pictured in 2015) spent almost his entire career with the team and is one of their most successful riders in terms of race wins.

The team was created as Quick-Step–Davitamon in 2003 from staff and riders of Domo–Farm Frites and Mapei–Quick-Step when the latter disbanded after nine years in the sport. Paolo Bettini won the UCI Road World Cup in 2003 and 2004 as well as the 2004 Summer Olympics road title in 2004.

In the 2005 UCI ProTour season, renamed Quick-Step–Innergetic, the team won a large number of classics: Tom Boonen won Tour of Flanders and Paris–Roubaix, Filippo Pozzato the HEW Cyclassics, and Paolo Bettini the Züri-Metzgete and the Giro di Lombardia. In late 2005 Tom Boonen won the 2005 UCI Road World Championships in Madrid, where Michael Rogers won the time-trial.

In 2006 Boonen retained the Tour of Flanders and held the yellow jersey in the 2006 Tour de France during stage 3–6, and Filippo Pozzato won 2006 Milan–San Remo. Paolo Bettini won the world championship in Salzburg and retained his Giro di Lombardia crown. In 2007 Tom Boonen won the points classification in the Tour de France, taking two stage wins. Bettini defended his world championship in Stuttgart.

In 2008 Gert Steegmans took the final stage of the 2008 Tour de France on the Champs-Élysées. Paolo Bettini retired after the world championship in Varese. In both 2008 and 2009 Stijn Devolder took the Tour of Flanders and Tom Boonen, Paris–Roubaix. After two seasons of disappointment, a resurgent Omega Pharma–Quick-Step and Tom Boonen took four major Spring classics victories, including the four cobblestone courses E3 Harelbeke, Gent–Wevelgem, Tour of Flanders, Paris–Roubaix.

In October 2012, the team fired their veteran rider Levi Leipheimer after he admitted to doping in a sworn affidavit to USADA. This was despite the team statement that "commended" Leipheimer for his "open cooperation" in the USADA investigation that exposed Lance Armstrong's long-term cheating in cycling via doping. The team's action was described by USADA head Travis Tygart as "The classic Omertà move, right? Actions speak louder than words. On the one hand, they say they congratulate him on coming forward, [but] their action terminating him for being truthful speaks a lot louder than their words."

CyclingNews reported in the same article that the team's claim to have only recently learned of Leipheimer's past doping was according to Tygart "absolutely not true... Leipheimer and a USADA attorney told the team months ago of the investigation, and of Leipheimer's role". Cyclingnews noted that Omega Pharma general manager Patrick Lefevere "had admitted in 2007 to having used doping products, including amphetamines, during his own career". Lefevere is still CEO of Etixx as of September 2015.

On 17 July 2014, the team announced that Iljo Keisse had been given a two-year contract extension. Tony Martin confirmed via his Twitter account that he had signed a two-year contract extension. On 19 August the team announced that Pieter Serry had signed a two-year contract extension, on 27 August the team announced the signing of Maxime Bouet on a two-year deal and on 1 September the team announced the signing of David de la Cruz on a two-year contract. In 2014 Michał Kwiatkowski won a rainbow jersey in 2014 UCI Road World Championships – Men's road race in Ponferrada, Spain.

In February 2015, the team announced it had signed 2015 UCI World Omnium champion, Fernando Gaviria, and fellow Colombian, Rodrigo Contreras, on two-year deals set to commence at the start of the 2016 season. In August 2015, the team signed Davide Martinelli for the 2016 and 2017 seasons.

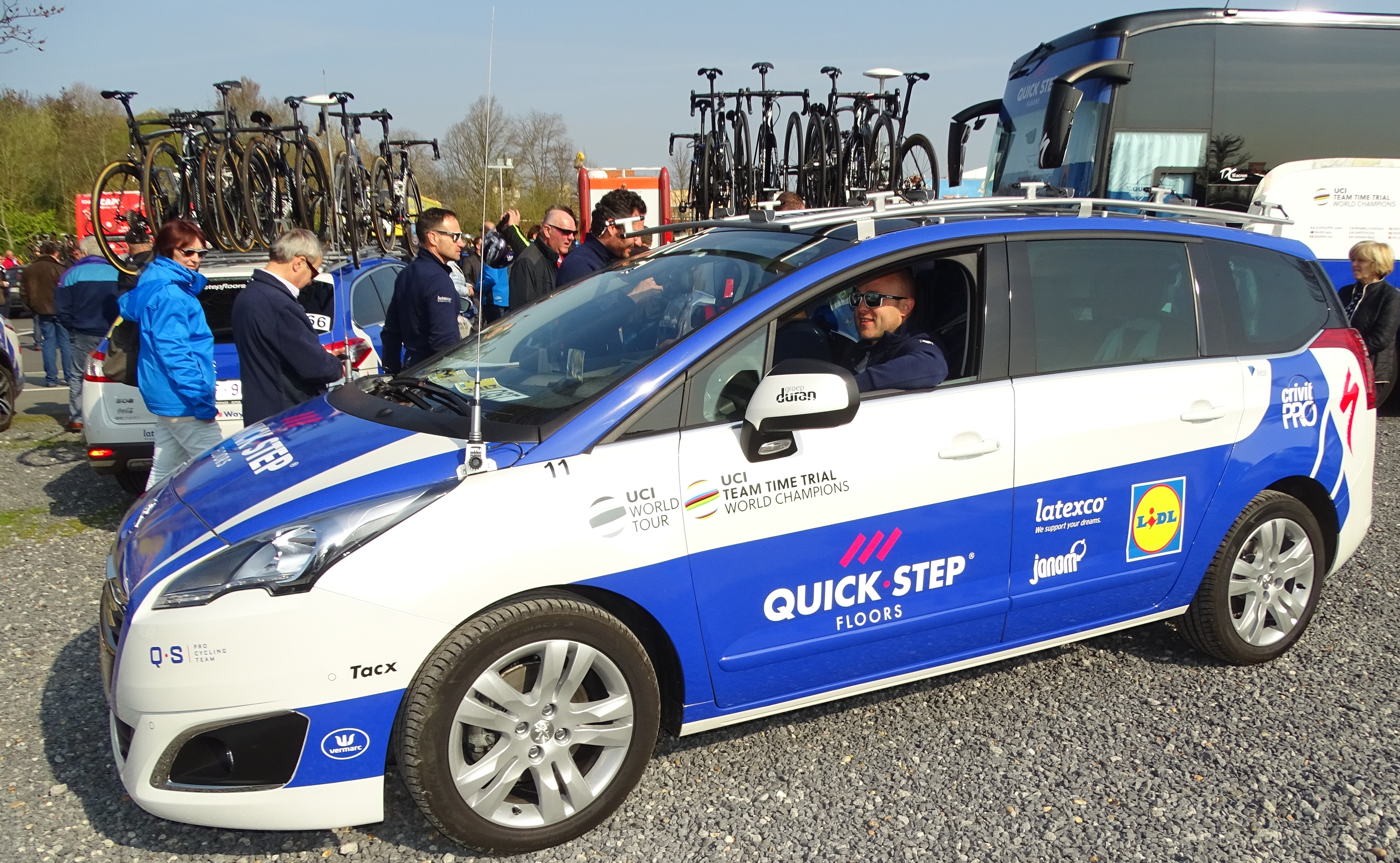
A team car in 2017

As of April 2021, the team has won more than 800 races, making it one of the most successful squads in history.

With the win in 7th stage of 2024 Tour de France, the team won stages in 12 Tour de France in a row, the longest active streak and second only to TI Raleigh with 17 (1976-1992).

=== Sponsorship and ownership ===
The team is operated by the company Decolef Lux, based in Luxembourg with branches in France and Belgium. A majority shareholder of the company is a Czech businessman Zdeněk Bakala. Title sponsors throughout its history have been Quick-Step Flooring, a division of Mohawk Industries, who had previously been co-sponsors of the Mapei team from 1999 to 2003.

Belgian pharmaceutical company Omega Pharma had two spells as title co-sponsors (2003–07 and 2012–16), using either the company name or one of its products. Either side of its first involvement with this team, Omega were sponsors of their Belgian rivals.

Deceuninck, a manufacturer of PVC-systems windows, became the primary sponsors from 2019, with Quick-Step Floors remaining as secondary sponsor. At the Tour of Flanders in 2020 and 2021, the team carried the name of a Deceuninck product line, Elegant, rather than that of the company. Deceuninck ended their sponsorship of the team following the 2021 season, while Quick-Step Floors extended their sponsorship until 2027. In 2023 Belgian chemical company Soudal joined as a title sponsor.

== Team roster ==
As of 14 March 2026.

Rider	Date of birth
Ayco Bastiaens (BEL)	3 June 1996 (age 30)
Steff Cras (BEL)	13 February 1996 (age 30)
Alberto Dainese (ITA)	25 March 1998 (age 28)
Pascal Eenkhoorn (NED)	8 February 1997 (age 29)
Gianmarco Garofoli (ITA)	6 October 2002 (age 23)
Gil Gelders (BEL)	16 December 2002 (age 23)
Ethan Hayter (GBR)	18 September 1998 (age 27)
Yves Lampaert (BEL)	10 April 1991 (age 35)
Mikel Landa (ESP)	13 December 1989 (age 36)
Junior Lecerf (BEL)	15 October 2002 (age 23)
Paul Magnier (FRA)	14 April 2004 (age 22)
Tim Merlier (BEL)	30 October 1992 (age 33)
Valentin Paret-Peintre (FRA)	14 January 2001 (age 25)
Casper Pedersen (DEN)	15 March 1996 (age 30)

Rider	Date of birth
Pepijn Reinderink (NED)	4 May 2002 (age 24)
Laurenz Rex (BEL)	15 December 1999 (age 26)
Maximilian Schachmann (GER)	9 January 1994 (age 32)
Jasper Stuyven (BEL)	17 April 1992 (age 34)
Martin Svrček (SVK)	17 February 2003 (age 23)
Dylan van Baarle (NED)	21 May 1992 (age 34)
Fabio Van den Bossche (BEL)	21 September 2000 (age 25)
Dries Van Gestel (BEL)	30 September 1994 (age 31)
Bert Van Lerberghe (BEL)	29 September 1992 (age 33)
Ilan Van Wilder (BEL)	14 May 2000 (age 26)
Warre Vangheluwe (BEL)	23 July 2001 (age 25)
Mauri Vansevenant (BEL)	1 June 1999 (age 27)
Louis Vervaeke (BEL)	6 October 1993 (age 32)
Filippo Zana (ITA)	18 March 1999 (age 27)

== National, continental and world champions ==
2003
World Time Trial Michael Rogers
Italian Road Race Paolo Bettini
Hungarian Time Trial László Bodrogi
2004
Hungarian Time Trial László Bodrogi
Olympic Road Race, Paolo Bettini
World Time Trial Michael Rogers
2005
World Road Race Tom Boonen
World Time Trial Michael Rogers
2006
World Road Race Paolo Bettini
Italian Road Race Paolo Bettini
2007
World Road Race Paolo Bettini
Italian Road Race Giovanni Visconti
2008
Belgian Time Trial Stijn Devolder
2009
Belarus Time Trial Branislau Samoilau
Belgian Road Race Tom Boonen
2010
Belgian Road Race Stijn Devolder
Belgian Time Trial Stijn Devolder
Belarus Time Trial Branislau Samoilau
2011
French Road Race Sylvain Chavanel
Curaçao Road Race Marc de Maar
Curaçao Time Trial Marc de Maar
2012
Czech Cyclocross Zdeněk Štybar
Belgian Road Race Tom Boonen
Irish Road Race Matt Brammeier
Netherlands Road Race Niki Terpstra
Polish Road Race Michał Gołaś
French Time Trial Sylvain Chavanel
German Time Trial Tony Martin
Slovak Time Trial Peter Velits
Italian Time Trial Dario Cataldo
Belgian Time Trial Kristof Vandewalle
World Team Time Trial
World Time Trial Tony Martin
2013
Czech Cyclocross Zdeněk Štybar
French Time Trial Sylvain Chavanel
German Time Trial Tony Martin
Slovak Time Trial Peter Velits
Polish Road Race Michał Kwiatkowski
British Road Race Mark Cavendish
Belgian Time Trial Kristof Vandewalle
World Team Time Trial
World Time Trial Tony Martin
2014
World Cyclocross Zdeněk Štybar
Polish Time Trial Michał Kwiatkowski
German Time Trial Tony Martin
Czech Road Race Zdeněk Štybar
World Road Race Michał Kwiatkowski
2015
Colombian Time Trial Rigoberto Urán
German Time Trial Tony Martin
Czech Road Race Petr Vakoč
Netherlands Road Race Niki Terpstra
2016
World Track (Omnium) Fernando Gaviria
German Time Trial Tony Martin
Luxembourg Time Trial Bob Jungels
Luxembourg Road Race Bob Jungels
World Team Time Trial
World Time Trial Tony Martin
2017
New Zealand Time Trial Jack Bauer
Belgian Time Trial Yves Lampaert
Czech Road Race Zdeněk Štybar
Luxembourg Road Race Bob Jungels
2018
Belgian Road Race Yves Lampaert
Luxembourg Time Trial Bob Jungels
Italian Road Race Elia Viviani
Danish Road Race Michael Mørkøv
Luxembourg Road Race Bob Jungels
World Team Time Trial
2019
Argentine Road Race Maximiliano Richeze
Danish Time Trial Kasper Asgreen
Luxembourg Time Trial Bob Jungels
Luxembourg Road Race Bob Jungels
Netherlands Road Race Fabio Jakobsen
Danish Road Race Michael Mørkøv
European Time Trial Remco Evenepoel
European Road Race Elia Viviani
European Track Championships (Madison) Michael Mørkøv
2020
New Zealand Road Race Shane Archbold
World Track Championships (Madison) Michael Mørkøv
Luxembourg Time Trial Bob Jungels
French Time Trial Rémi Cavagna
Danish Time Trial Kasper Asgreen
Danish Road Race Kasper Asgreen
World Road Race Julian Alaphilippe
2021
Belgian Time Trial Yves Lampaert
Danish Time Trial Kasper Asgreen
Czech Republic Time Trial, Josef Černý
Portuguese Time Trial João Almeida
French Road Race Rémi Cavagna
World Road Race Julian Alaphilippe
World Track Championships (Madison) Michael Mørkøv
2022
Belgian Time Trial Remco Evenepoel
French Road Race Florian Sénéchal
British Road Race Mark Cavendish
European Road Race Fabio Jakobsen
World Road Race Remco Evenepoel
2023
French Time Trial Rémi Cavagna
Danish Time Trial Kasper Asgreen
Belgian Road Race Remco Evenepoel
World Time Trial Remco Evenepoel
2024
Olympic Road Race Remco Evenepoel
Olympic Road Time Trial Remco Evenepoel
European Road Race Tim Merlier
World Time Trial Remco Evenepoel
