= 1993 Scheldeprijs =

Race details
- Dates: 21 April 1993
- Stages: 1
- Distance: 208 km (129.2 mi)
- Winning time: 5h 08' 03"

Results
	Winner	Mario Cipollini (ITA)
	Second	Wilfried Nelissen (BEL)
	Third	Giuseppe Citterio (ITA)

The 1993 Scheldeprijs was the 80th edition of the Scheldeprijs cycle race and was held on 21 April 1993. The race was won by Mario Cipollini.

== General classification ==
Final general classification

Rank	Rider	Time
1	Mario Cipollini (ITA)	5h 08' 03"
2	Wilfried Nelissen (BEL)	+ 0"
3	Giuseppe Citterio (ITA)	+ 0"
4	Jaan Kirsipuu (EST)	+ 0"
5	Michel Zanoli (NED)	+ 0"
6	Jelle Nijdam (NED)	+ 0"
7	Johnny Dauwe (BEL)	+ 0"
8	Johan Capiot (BEL)	+ 0"
9	Frédéric Moncassin (FRA)	+ 0"
10	Alain Van Den Bossche (BEL)	+ 0"
