= 1993 E3 Prijs Vlaanderen =

Race details
- Dates: 27 March 1993
- Stages: 1
- Distance: 208 km (129 mi)
- Winning time: 4h 59' 24"

Results
	Winner	Mario Cipollini (ITA)	(GB–MG Maglificio)
	Second	Olaf Ludwig (GER)	(Team Telekom)
	Third	Jelle Nijdam (NED)	(WordPerfect–Colnago–Decca)

The 1993 E3 Prijs Vlaanderen was the 36th edition of the E3 Harelbeke cycle race and was held on 27 March 1993. The race started and finished in Harelbeke. The race was won by Mario Cipollini of the GB–MG Maglificio team.

== General classification ==
Final general classification

Rank	Rider	Team	Time
1	Mario Cipollini (ITA)	GB–MG Maglificio	4h 59' 24"
2	Olaf Ludwig (GER)	Team Telekom	+ 0"
3	Jelle Nijdam (NED)	WordPerfect–Colnago–Decca	+ 0"
4	Eric Vanderaerden (BEL)	WordPerfect–Colnago–Decca	+ 0"
5	Michel Zanoli (NED)	Elro Snacks–Van Griensven	+ 0"
6	Adriano Baffi (ITA)	Mercatone Uno–Zucchini–Medeghini	+ 0"
7	Nico Verhoeven (NED)	Novemail–Histor–Laser Computer	+ 0"
8	Michel Vanhaecke (BEL)	Lotto	+ 0"
9	Alain Van Den Bossche (BEL)	TVM–Bison Kit	+ 0"
10	Uwe Raab (GER)	Team Telekom	+ 0"
