= 2000 E3 Prijs Vlaanderen =

2000 E3 Harelbeke
Race details
- Dates: 25 March 2000
- Stages: 1
- Distance: 209 km (130 mi)
- Winning time: 5h 13' 00"

Results
	Winner	Sergei Ivanov (RUS)	(Farm Frites)
	Second	Geert Van Bondt (BEL)	(Farm Frites)
	Third	Chris Peers (BEL)	(Cofidis)

The 2000 E3 Harelbeke was the 43rd edition of the E3 Harelbeke cycle race and was held on 25 March 2000. The race started and finished in Harelbeke. The race was won by Sergei Ivanov of the Farm Frites team.

== General classification ==
Final general classification

Rank	Rider	Team	Time
1	Sergei Ivanov (RUS)	Farm Frites	5h 13' 00"
2	Geert Van Bondt (BEL)	Farm Frites	+ 56"
3	Chris Peers (BEL)	Cofidis	+ 56"
4	Marc Wauters (BEL)	Rabobank	+ 1' 31"
5	Hendrik Van Dijck (BEL)	Palmans–Ideal	+ 1' 43"
6	Peter Van Petegem (BEL)	Farm Frites	+ 1' 43"
7	Fabio Sacchi (ITA)	Team Polti	+ 1' 43"
8	Gianpaolo Mondini (ITA)	Cantina Tollo–Regain	+ 1' 43"
9	Andreas Klier (GER)	Farm Frites	+ 1' 43"
10	Max van Heeswijk (NED)	Mapei–Quick-Step	+ 1' 43"
