= 2002 Omloop Het Volk =

Race details
- Dates: 2 March 2002
- Stages: 1
- Distance: 202 km (126 mi)
- Winning time: 4h 52' 30"

Results
	Winner	Peter Van Petegem (BEL)
	Second	Frank Høj (DEN)
	Third	Michel Vanhaecke (BEL)

The 2002 Omloop Het Volk was the 56th edition of the Omloop Het Volk cycle race and was held on 2 March 2002. The race started in Ghent and finished in Lokeren. The race was won by Peter Van Petegem.

== General classification ==
Final general classification
Rank	Rider	Time
1	Peter Van Petegem (BEL)	4h 52' 30"
2	Frank Høj (DEN)	+ 4"
3	Michel Vanhaecke (BEL)	+ 16"
4	Robbie McEwen (AUS)	+ 16"
5	Paolo Bettini (ITA)	+ 16"
6	Kevin Hulsmans (BEL)	+ 16"
7	Andrei Tchmil (BEL)	+ 16"
8	Hendrik Van Dijck (BEL)	+ 16"
9	Jo Planckaert (BEL)	+ 16"
10	Chris Peers (BEL)	+ 16"
