= 1999 Grote Prijs Jef Scherens =

Race details
- Dates: 5 September 1999
- Stages: 1
- Distance: 192 km (119.3 mi)
- Winning time: 4h 28' 00"

Results
	Winner	Marc Streel (BEL)
	Second	Michel Vanhaecke (BEL)
	Third	Gert Vanderaerden (BEL)

The 1999 Grote Prijs Jef Scherens was the 33rd edition of the Grote Prijs Jef Scherens cycle race and was held on 5 September 1999. The race started and finished in Leuven. The race was won by Marc Streel.

== General classification ==
Final general classification

Rank	Rider	Time
1	Marc Streel (BEL)	4h 28' 00"
2	Michel Vanhaecke (BEL)	+ 36"
3	Gert Vanderaerden (BEL)	+ 36"
4	Arvis Piziks (LAT)	+ 36"
5	Léon van Bon (NED)	+ 36"
6	Peter Farazijn (BEL)	+ 42"
7	Erwin Thijs (BEL)	+ 44"
8	Dave Bruylandts (BEL)	+ 46"
9	Bert Roesems (BEL)	+ 46"
10	Jürgen Van Roosbroeck (BEL)	+ 46"
