= Nice–Alassio =

Race details
- Date: February
- Region: France and Italy
- Discipline: Road
- Type: One-day race

History
- First edition: 1979
- Editions: 15
- Final edition: 1997
- First winner: Jean-François Pescheux (FRA)
- Final winner: Gabriele Balducci (ITA)

Nice–Alassio was a professional one-day road cycling race that was held from 1979 until 1997. It was known as Monte Carlo–Alassio from 1993 to 1996 and the Alassio Cup in 1997.

The race was held in February as a preparation race for Milan–San Remo.

== Winners ==
Year	Country	Rider	Team
1979	France	Jean-François Pescheux	La Redoute–Motobécane
1980	Italy	Francesco Moser	Sanson–Campagnolo
1981	Switzerland	Bruno Wolfer	Bianchi–Piaggio
1982	France	René Bittinger	Sem–France Loire–Campagnolo
1983	France	Éric Dall'Armellina	Sem–France Loire–Reydel–Mavic
1984	Ireland	Stephen Roche	La Redoute
1985	Italy	Pierino Gavazzi	Atala
1986	Italy	Giovanni Mantovani	Vini Ricordi–Pinarello–Sidermec
1987	Italy	Giuseppe Calcaterra	Atala–Ofmega
1988	No race		
1989	Belgium	Wim Van Eynde	Lotto–Vlaanderen–Jong–Mbk–Merckx
1990	No race		
1991	No race		
1992	No race		
1993	Italy	Gianluca Bortolami	Lampre–Polti
1994	Italy	Adriano Baffi	Mercatone Uno–Medeghini
1995	Italy	Mario Cipollini	Mercatone Uno–Saeco
1996	Italy	Filippo Casagrande	Scrigno–Blue Storm
1997	Italy	Gabriele Balducci	Refin–Mobilvetta
