= 1989 Paris–Tours =

1989 UCI Road World Cup, race 11 of 12

Race details
- Dates: 7 October 1989
- Stages: 1
- Distance: 283 km (175.8 mi)
- Winning time: 7h 11' 42"

Results
	Winner	Jelle Nijdam (NED)	(Superconfex–Yoko–Opel–Colnago)
	Second	Eric Vanderaerden (BEL)	(Panasonic–Isostar–Colnago–Agu)
	Third	Johan Museeuw (BEL)	(AD Renting–W-Cup–Bottecchia)

The 1989 Paris–Tours was the 83rd edition of the Paris–Tours cycle race and was held on 7 October 1989. The race started in Chaville and finished in Tours. The race was won by Jelle Nijdam of the Superconfex team.

== General classification ==
Final general classification

Rank	Rider	Team	Time
1	Jelle Nijdam (NED)	Superconfex–Yoko–Opel–Colnago	7h 11' 42"
2	Eric Vanderaerden (BEL)	Panasonic–Isostar–Colnago–Agu	+ 0"
3	Johan Museeuw (BEL)	AD Renting–W-Cup–Bottecchia	+ 0"
4	Rolf Sørensen (DEN)	Ariostea	+ 0"
5	Adriano Baffi (ITA)	Ariostea	+ 0"
6	Sammie Moreels (BEL)	Lotto–Vlaanderen–Jong–Mbk–Merckx	+ 0"
7	Sean Kelly (IRL)	PDM–Ultima–Concorde	+ 0"
8	Marcel Wüst (FRG)	RMO	+ 0"
9	Guido Bontempi (ITA)	Carrera Jeans–Vagabond	+ 0"
10	Jean-Claude Colotti (FRA)	RMO	+ 0"
