= 1995 Dwars door België =

Race details
- Dates: 22 March 1995
- Stages: 1
- Distance: 210 km (130.5 mi)
- Winning time: 5h 13' 00"

Results
	Winner	Jelle Nijdam (NED)
	Second	Tom Steels (BEL)
	Third	Adriano Baffi (ITA)

The 1995 Dwars door België was the 50th edition of the Dwars door Vlaanderen cycle race and was held on 22 March 1995. The race started and finished in Waregem. The race was won by Jelle Nijdam.

== General classification ==
Final general classification

Rank	Rider	Time
1	Jelle Nijdam (NED)	5h 13' 00"
2	Tom Steels (BEL)	+ 11"
3	Adriano Baffi (ITA)	+ 11"
4	Erik Zabel (GER)	+ 11"
5	Wilfried Nelissen (BEL)	+ 11"
6	Tristan Hoffman (NED)	+ 11"
7	Fabrizio Bontempi (ITA)	+ 11"
8	Hendrik Redant (BEL)	+ 11"
9	Wilfried Peeters (BEL)	+ 11"
10	Jo Planckaert (BEL)	+ 11"
