= Filippo Casagrande =

Italian cyclist

Personal information
- Born: 28 July 1973 (age 53) Florence, Italy

Cycling career
- Sport: Cycling
- Current team: Retired
- Discipline: Road
- Role: Rider

Professional teams
- 1995: Brescialat–Fago
- 1996–1998: Scrigno–Blue Storm
- 1999–2000: Vini Caldirola
- 2001–2002: Fassa Bortolo

Major wins
- Grand Tours Giro d'Italia 1 individual stage (1995)

Filippo Casagrande (born 28 July 1973, in Florence) is an Italian former racing cyclist, who competed as a professional from 1995 to 2002. He is the brother of fellow cyclists Francesco and Stefano Casagrande. He is most notable for winning a stage of the 1995 Giro d'Italia.

== Major results ==
1994 (1 pro win)
1st Overall Giro d'Abruzzo
1st Overall Giro della Toscana Under-23
1st Gran Premio Industria e Commercio Artigianato Carnaghese
1st Stages 3 & 6 Girobio
1995 (1)
1st Stage 5 Giro d'Italia
1996 (6)
1st Monte Carlo–Alassio
1st Coppa Ugo Agostoni
1st Stage 4 Tirreno–Adriatico
1st Stages 2, 4, & 5 Regio-Tour
1st Stages 2 & 5 Trofeo dello Stretto
2nd Gran Premio Industria e Commercio di Prato
2nd Milano–Vignola
3rd Trofeo Melinda
1997
2nd Memorial Nencini
1998
6th Milan–San Remo

=== Grand Tour general classification results timeline ===
Grand Tour	1995	1996	1997	1998	1999	2000
Giro d'Italia	DNF	87	DNF	71	54	60
Tour de France	—	—	—	—	—	DNF
Vuelta a España	—	—	—	—	—	—

Legend
DNF	Did not finish
