= Wilfried Nelissen =

Belgian cyclist

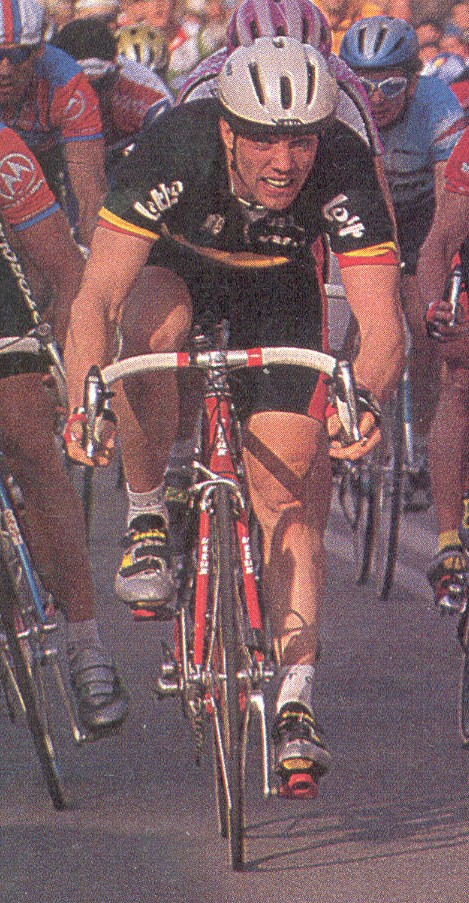
- Nelissen at the 1995 Vuelta a Andalucía

Personal information
- Full name: Wilfried Nelissen
- Nickname: Jerommeke
- Born: 5 May 1970 (age 56) Tongeren, Belgium

Cycling career
- Sport: Cycling
- Current team: Retired
- Discipline: Road
- Role: Rider
- Rider type: Sprinter

Professional teams
- 1990–1991: Domex–Weinmann
- 1992: Panasonic–Sportlife
- 1993–1994: Novemail–Histor–Laser Computer
- 1995–1996: Lotto–Isoglass
- 1997: Palmans–Lystex

Major wins
- Grand Tours Tour de France 1 individual stage (1993) 1 TTT stage (1992) One-day races and Classics Omloop Het Volk (1993, 1994) Scheldeprijs (1992) Clásica de Almería (1996) National Road Race Championships (1994, 1995)

Wilfried Nelissen (born 5 May 1970) is a Belgian former road racing cyclist, who specialised as a sprinter.

Nelissen took over 50 professional wins in his career, including a stage of the 1993 Tour de France and the Omloop Het Volk in 1993 and 1994, in addition to two national road race championships. He was involved in a crash at the end of stage 1 of the 1994 Tour de France, when he collided with a policeman. The incident also involved French rider Laurent Jalabert. Nelissen retired in 1998 due to a knee injury that he suffered in 1996 after falling during the Gent–Wevelgem race.

== Major results ==
1988
3rd Omloop der Vlaamse Gewesten
1990
1st Seraing–Aachen–Seraing
1st Stage 7 Grand Prix Guillaume Tell
1991 (3 pro wins)
1st Overall Tour de Picardie

1st Stage 2

1st Flèche Hesbignonne
1st Stage 3b (ITT) Tour de Luxembourg
7th Omloop Het Volk
10th E3 Prijs Vlaanderen
1992 (11)
1st Overall Paris–Bourges

1st Stage 2

1st Scheldeprijs
1st Omloop Mandel-Leie-Schelde
1st Stage 4 (TTT) Tour de France
1st Stages 3 & 6 Tour de Suisse
1st Stages 1 & 3 Critérium du Dauphiné Libéré
1st Stage 1 Ronde van Nederland
1st Stage 2 Vuelta a Andalucía
1st Stage 1 Tour of Ireland
5th Dwars door België
7th Omloop Het Volk
1993 (7)
1st Omloop Het Volk
1st Le Samyn
Tour de France

1st Stage 2
Held after Stages 2–3 & 5

1st Stages 1, 2 & 4 Ronde van Nederland
1st Stage 3 Vuelta a Andalucía
2nd Scheldeprijs
6th Binche–Tournai–Binche
8th Gent–Wevelgem
1994 (11)
1st Road race, National Road Championships
1st Omloop Het Volk
1st Grand Prix d'Isbergues
1st Omloop Mandel-Leie-Schelde
1st Binche–Tournai–Binche
1st Stages 1 & 2 Four Days of Dunkirk
1st Stages 1 & 3 Étoile de Bessèges
1st Stage 2 Tour Méditerranéen
1st Stage 4 Vuelta a Asturias
2nd Grand Prix d'Ouverture La Marseillaise
5th Classic Haribo
6th Grote Prijs Jef Scherens
8th GP de Fourmies
9th Paris–Tours
1995 (15)
1st Road race, National Road Championships
1st Omloop van de Vlaamse Scheldeboorden
1st Stages 1 & 3 Paris–Nice
1st Stage 3 Four Days of Dunkirk
1st Stage 3 Ronde van Nederland
1st Stage 2 Grand Prix du Midi Libre
1st Stages 1, 3 & 5 Étoile de Bessèges
1st Stages 1 & 2 Tour de Picardie
1st Stages 1a, 2 & 4 Route du Sud
4th Omloop Het Volk
4th Paris–Brussels
4th GP de Fourmies
5th Dwars door België
6th GP du canton d'Argovie
7th Gent–Wevelgem
8th Brussel–Ingooigem
10th Overall Driedaagse van De Panne-Koksijde
10th Scheldeprijs
1996 (7)
1st Clásica de Almería
1st Stage 2 Paris–Nice
1st Stages 1, 2 & 3 Étoile de Bessèges
1st Stages 1 & 4 Vuelta a Andalucía
3rd E3 Prijs Vlaanderen
5th Kuurne–Brussels–Kuurne
