= 1993 Gent–Wevelgem =

Race details
- Dates: 7 April 1993
- Stages: 1
- Distance: 210 km (130 mi)
- Winning time: 5h 23' 10"

Results
	Winner	Mario Cipollini (ITA)	(GB–MG Maglificio)
	Second	Eric Vanderaerden (BEL)	(WordPerfect–Colnago–Decca)
	Third	Djamolidine Abdoujaparov (UZB)	(Lampre–Polti)

The 1993 Gent–Wevelgem was the 55th edition of the Belgian Gent–Wevelgem cycle race and was held on 7 April 1993. The race started in Ghent and finished in Wevelgem. The race was won by Mario Cipollini of the GB–MG Maglificio team.

== General classification ==
Final general classification

Rank	Rider	Team	Time
1	Mario Cipollini (ITA)	GB–MG Maglificio	5h 23' 10"
2	Eric Vanderaerden (BEL)	WordPerfect–Colnago–Decca	+ 0"
3	Djamolidine Abdoujaparov (UZB)	Lampre–Polti	+ 0"
4	Frédéric Moncassin (FRA)	WordPerfect–Colnago–Decca	+ 0"
5	Olaf Ludwig (GER)	Team Telekom	+ 0"
6	Johan Capiot (BEL)	TVM–Bison Kit	+ 0"
7	Laurent Jalabert (FRA)	ONCE	+ 0"
8	Wilfried Nelissen (BEL)	Novemail–Histor–Laser Computer	+ 0"
9	Michele Bartoli (ITA)	Mercatone Uno–Zucchini–Medeghini	+ 0"
10	Adriano Baffi (ITA)	Mercatone Uno–Zucchini–Medeghini	+ 0"
