= Jelle Nijdam =

Dutch cyclist (born 1963)

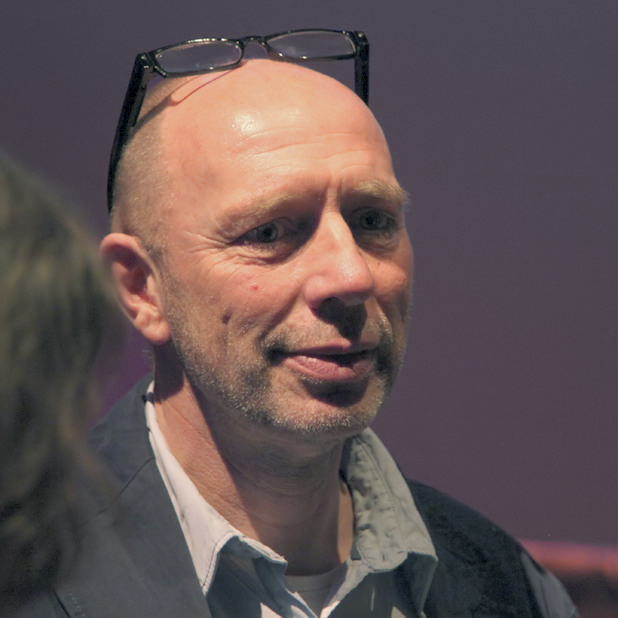
- Nijdam in 2013

Personal information
- Full name: Jelle Nijdam
- Nickname: Snelle Jelle
- Born: 16 August 1963 (age 63) Zundert, Netherlands

Cycling career
- Sport: Cycling
- Discipline: Road
- Role: Rider
- Rider type: Time trialist Classics specialist

Professional teams
- 1984–1994: Kwantum–Decosol
- 1995–1996: TVM

Major wins
- Grand Tours Tour de France 6 individual stages (1987–1991) Vuelta a España 1 individual stage (1992) One-day races and Classics Amstel Gold Race (1988) Paris–Tours (1989)

Jelle Nijdam (born 16 August 1963) is a Dutch former professional road cyclist. Nijdam turned professional after the 1984 Summer Olympics in Los Angeles. He participated in the Tour de France 10 times, winning six stages and wearing the yellow jersey for three days. Nijdam's father, Henk Nijdam, was a professional cyclist from 1962 to 1969, who won the 1962 world amateur track pursuit championship. He also competed in the individual pursuit and team pursuit events at the 1984 Summer Olympics.

== Career achievements ==
=== Major results ===
1984
Olympia's Tour

1st Prologue & Stage 7b (ITT)

1985
1st Overall Tour de Luxembourg
1st Grand Prix Impanis
Tour of Sweden

1st Prologue & Stage 3

1st Prologue Tour of Belgium
3rd GP Stad Vilvoorde
4th Overall Three Days of De Panne
1986
1st Prologue Ronde van Nederland
1st Stage 3b (ITT) Tour de Luxembourg
3rd Overall Danmark Rundt

1st Young rider classification
1st Stage 1

3rd Overall Tour of Sweden

1st Prologue

7th Ronde van Limburg
9th Overall Three Days of De Panne
1987
1st Overall Tour de l'Oise

1st Prologue

1st Dwars door België
Tour de France

1st Prologue
Held & after Prologue
Held after Prologue & Stage 1

1st Prologue Ronde van Nederland
1st Prologue Danmark Rundt
1st Prologue Tour of Sweden
1st Prologue Four Days of Dunkirk
2nd E3 Prijs Vlaanderen
1988
1st Amstel Gold Race
Tour de France

1st Stage 5
Held after Stages 6–7

1st Stage 3 Vuelta Asturias
3rd Kuurne–Brussels–Kuurne
4th Overall Three Days of De Panne
5th Grand Prix Eddy Merckx
8th Overall Ronde van Nederland

1st Prologue & Stage 5 (ITT)

1989
1st Paris–Tours
1st Paris–Brussels
Tour de France

1st Stages 4 & 14

1st Stage 1 Ronde van Nederland
1st Stage 1 Nissan Classic
1st Stage 3 Vuelta Asturias
1st Prologue Tour of Sweden
2nd Overall Three Days of De Panne
2nd Overall Tour de l'Oise

1st Stage 2

5th Veenendaal–Veenendaal
9th Grand Prix de la Libération
1990
1st Overall Ronde van Nederland

1st Prologue

1st Binche-Tournai-Binche
1st Stage 6 Tour de France
1st Stage 2 Vuelta a Murcia
Four Days of Dunkirk

1st Stages 5 & 6 (ITT)

2nd Grand Prix Eddy Merckx
2nd Kuurne–Brussels–Kuurne
3rd Overall Tour of Sweden

1st Prologue & Stage 4

3rd Amstel Gold Race
4th E3 Prijs Vlaanderen
4th Paris–Brussels
1991
1st Overall Three Days of De Panne

1st Stages 1b (ITT) & 3

1st Stage 5 Tour de France
Tour Méditerranéen

1st Stages 2 & 3b (ITT)

3rd Circuit des Frontières
4th Grand Prix Eddy Merckx
5th Omloop Het Volk
6th Le Samyn
8th Kuurne–Brussels–Kuurne
9th Overall Ronde van Nederland

1st Prologue

9th Amstel Gold Race
1992
1st Overall Ronde van Nederland

1st Prologue & Stage 2b (ITT)

1st Grand Prix Eddy Merckx
Vuelta a España

1st Stage 1 (ITT)
Held after Stages 1–2a

1st Stage 7 Vuelta a Aragón
3rd Omloop van het Houtland
5th Overall Three Days of De Panne
5th Gent–Wevelgem
5th Baden-Baden (with Frans Maassen)
6th Tour of Flanders
7th E3 Prijs Vlaanderen
8th Grand Prix des Nations
8th Veenendaal–Veenendaal
9th Amstel Gold Race
9th Omloop Het Volk
1993
1st Stage 3b (ITT) Three Days of De Panne
1st Stage 2 Vuelta Asturias
1st Prologue Tour DuPont
2nd Overall Ronde van Nederland
2nd Paris–Brussels
3rd E3 Prijs Vlaanderen
3rd Grand Prix Eddy Merckx
5th Grand Prix des Nations
6th Scheldeprijs
9th Ronde van Limburg
1994
1st Kampioenschap van Vlaanderen
1st De Kustpijl
4th Le Samyn
5th Overall Tour de l'Oise
5th Scheldeprijs
1995
1st Overall Ronde van Nederland

1st Stage 5

1st Overall Tour de l'Oise

1st Stage 1

1st Dwars door België
1st Binche-Tournai-Binche
1st Stage 6 Vuelta a Aragón
2nd Nationale Sluitingsprijs
5th Omloop Het Volk
6th Overall Danmark Rundt
7th Time trial, National Road Championships
7th Overall Étoile de Bessèges
7th Grand Prix de Wallonie
7th Omloop van het Houtland
1996
1st Ronde van Midden-Zeeland
2nd Nokere Koerse
3rd Time trial, National Road Championships
8th Omloop Het Volk

=== Grand Tour general classification results timeline ===
Grand Tour	1985	1986	1987	1988	1989	1990	1991	1992	1993	1994	1995
Vuelta a España	—	—	—	—	—	—	DNF	103	—	—	—
Giro d'Italia	did not contest during his career										
Tour de France	115	DNF	124	122	121	127	117	113	129	—	DNF

Legend
—	Did not compete
DNF	Did not finish

== See also ==
- List of Dutch Olympic cyclists
- List of Dutch cyclists who have led the Tour de France general classification
