= 1999 Dwars door België =

Race details
- Dates: 24 March 1999
- Stages: 1
- Distance: 200 km (124.3 mi)
- Winning time: 4h 29' 10"

Results
	Winner	Johan Museeuw (BEL)
	Second	Michel Vanhaecke (BEL)
	Third	Chris Peers (BEL)

The 1999 Dwars door België was the 54th edition of the Dwars door Vlaanderen cycle race and was held on 24 March 1999. The race started in Kortrijk and finished in Waregem. The race was won by Johan Museeuw.

== General classification ==
Final general classification

Rank	Rider	Time
1	Johan Museeuw (BEL)	4h 29' 10"
2	Michel Vanhaecke (BEL)	+ 0"
3	Chris Peers (BEL)	+ 21"
4	Tom Steels (BEL)	+ 35"
5	Frank Vandenbroucke (BEL)	+ 35"
6	Peter Van Petegem (BEL)	+ 35"
7	Lars Michaelsen (DEN)	+ 46"
8	Henk Vogels (AUS)	+ 46"
9	Maarten den Bakker (NED)	+ 46"
10	Philippe Gaumont (FRA)	+ 56"
