= 1994 Milan–San Remo =

Race details
- Dates: 19 March 1994
- Stages: 1
- Distance: 294 km (183 mi)
- Winning time: 7h 05' 20"

Results
	Winner	Giorgio Furlan (ITA)	(Gewiss–Ballan)
	Second	Mario Cipollini (ITA)	(Mercatone Uno–Medeghini)
	Third	Adriano Baffi (ITA)	(Mercatone Uno–Medeghini)

The 1994 Milan–San Remo was the 85th edition of the Milan–San Remo cycle race and was held on 19 March 1994. The race started in Milan and finished in San Remo. The race was won by Giorgio Furlan of the Gewiss–Ballan team.

== General classification ==
Final general classification

Rank	Rider	Team	Time
1	Giorgio Furlan (ITA)	Gewiss–Ballan	7h 05' 20"
2	Mario Cipollini (ITA)	Mercatone Uno–Medeghini	+ 20"
3	Adriano Baffi (ITA)	Mercatone Uno–Medeghini	+ 20"
4	Stefano Zanini (ITA)	Navigare–Blue Storm	+ 20"
5	Kai Hundertmarck (GER)	Motorola	+ 20"
6	Fabio Baldato (ITA)	GB–MG Maglificio	+ 20"
7	Ángel Edo (ESP)	Kelme–Avianca–Gios	+ 20"
8	Fabiano Fontanelli (ITA)	ZG Mobili	+ 20"
9	Andrei Tchmil (MDA)	Lotto	+ 20"
10	Laurent Jalabert (FRA)	ONCE	+ 20"
