= 1996 Tirreno–Adriatico =

Race details
- Dates: 13–20 March 1996
- Stages: 8
- Distance: 1,370.2 km (851.4 mi)
- Winning time: 34h 46' 18"

Results
Jersey awarded to the overall winner	Winner	Francesco Casagrande (ITA)	(Saeco–AS Juvenes San Marino)
	Second	Alexander Gontchenkov (RUS)	(Roslotto–ZG Mobili)
	Third	Gianluca Pianegonda (ITA)	(Team Polti)

The 1996 Tirreno–Adriatico was the 31st edition of the Tirreno–Adriatico cycle race and was held from 13 March to 20 March 1996. The race started in Fiuggi and finished in San Benedetto del Tronto. The race was won by Francesco Casagrande of the Saeco team.

== Route ==
Stage characteristics and winners
Stage	Date	Course	Distance	Type	Winner
1	13 March	Fiuggi to Fiuggi	156 km (97 mi)		Léon van Bon (NED)
2	14 March	Ferentino to Santa Marinella	180 km (110 mi)		Djamolidine Abdoujaparov (UZB)
3	15 March	Santa Marinella to Santa Fiora	206 km (128 mi)		Fabiano Fontanelli (ITA)
4	16 March	Arcidosso to Soriano nel Cimino	205 km (127 mi)		Filippo Casagrande (ITA)
5a	17 March	Città della Pieve to Castiglione del Lago	85 km (53 mi)		Ján Svorada (CZE)
5b	17 March	Magione to Castiglione del Lago	28 km (17 mi)	Individual time trial	Evgeni Berzin (RUS)
6	18 March	Tuoro sul Trasimeno to Amandola	192 km (119 mi)		Michele Bartoli (ITA)
7	19 March	Sant'Elpidio a Mare to Monte San Pietrangeli	174 km (108 mi)		Rolf Sørensen (DEN)
8	20 March	Grottammare to San Benedetto del Tronto	159 km (99 mi)		Ján Svorada (CZE)

== General classification ==
Final general classification

Rank	Rider	Team	Time
1	Francesco Casagrande (ITA)	Saeco–AS Juvenes San Marino	34h 46' 18"
2	Alexander Gontchenkov (RUS)	Roslotto–ZG Mobili	+ 23"
3	Gianluca Pianegonda (ITA)	Team Polti	+ 29"
4	Michele Coppolillo (ITA)	MG Maglificio–Technogym	+ 32"
5	Gabriele Colombo (ITA)	Gewiss Playbus	+ 51"
6	Rodolfo Massi (ITA)	Refin–Mobilvetta	+ 1' 22"
7	Viatcheslav Ekimov (RUS)	Rabobank	+ 4' 30"
8	Filippo Casagrande (ITA)	Scrigno–Blue Storm	+ 5' 17"
9	Luca Gelfi (ITA)	Brescialat	+ 5' 19"
10	Marco Serpellini (ITA)	Panaria–Vinavil	+ 5' 54"
