= Michel Vanhaecke =

Belgian cyclist (born 1971)

Personal information
- Born: 24 September 1971 (age 55) Bruges, Belgium

Cycling career
- Sport: Cycling
- Current team: Retired
- Discipline: Road
- Role: Rider

Amateur team
- 1992: Lotto–Mavic–MBK (stagiaire)

Professional teams
- 1993–1994: Lotto
- 1995: Collstrop–Lystex
- 1996: Vosschemie–Zetelhallen
- 1997–1998: Ipso–Euroclean
- 1999–2002: Tönissteiner–Colnago
- 2003: Palmans–Collstrop
- 2004: Mr. Bookmaker–Palmans–Collstrop

Michel Vanhaecke (born 24 September 1971) is a Belgian former cyclist. He competed in the individual road race at the 1992 Summer Olympics.

== Major results ==
1989
10th Road race, UCI Junior Road World Championships
1991
1st Vlaamse Havenpijl
1992
2nd Kampioenschap van Vlaanderen
7th Overall Paris–Bourges
1993
3rd Cholet-Pays de Loire
5th Binche-Tournai-Binche
7th A travers le Morbihan
7th Omloop van het Houtland Lichtervelde
8th E3 Prijs Vlaanderen
9th Overall Tour de Luxembourg
10th Brussel-Ingooigem
1994
1st Omloop Schelde-Durme
2nd Road race, National Road Championships
8th Scheldeprijs
8th Overall Tour du Limousin
1995
3rd Paris–Camembert
6th Veenendaal–Veenendaal
7th Road race, National Road Championships
7th Tour de Berne
1996
4th Omloop van de Westhoek
1997
1st Le Samyn
1st Brussel-Ingooigem
2nd Hel van het Mergelland
6th Omloop van de Westhoek
7th Road race, National Road Championships
1998
8th Ronde van Overijssel
8th GP Stad Zottegem
8th Druivenkoers Overijse
1999
1st Kampioenschap van Vlaanderen
1st De Kustpijl
2nd Dwars door België
2nd Grote Prijs Jef Scherens
2nd Road race, National Road Championships
2nd Nokere Koerse
2nd Hel van het Mergelland
2nd Rund um Düren
3rd Leeuwse Pijl
5th Druivenkoers Overijse
7th E3 Prijs Vlaanderen
7th Scheldeprijs
8th GP Rik Van Steenbergen
9th Grand Prix Pino Cerami
9th GP Eddy Merckx (with Bert Roesems)
10th Le Samyn
2000
1st GP Stad Zottegem
1st Druivenkoers Overijse
2nd Grand Prix Pino Cerami
2nd De Kustpijl
3rd OZ Tour Beneden-Maas
4th GP Rudy Dhaenens
5th Schaal Sels
6th Gent–Wevelgem
6th Brussel–Izegem
6th Overall Circuit Franco-Belge
7th Nokere Koerse
10th Time trial, National Road Championships
2001
1st Nokere Koerse
1st Vlaamse Havenpijl
3rd Road race, National Road Championships
4th GP Stad Vilvoorde
6th Grand Prix Pino Cerami
6th Omloop van de Westhoek
7th Overall Tour de la Somme
9th Brussel-Ingooigem
2002
3rd Omloop Het Volk
4th Scheldeprijs
4th Druivenkoers Overijse
7th Veenendaal–Veenendaal
8th GP Rudy Dhaenens
9th Overall Circuit Franco-Belge
10th Paris-Brussels
2003
1st Stage 4 Course Cycliste de Solidarnosc et des Champions Olympiques
7th Druivenkoers Overijse
2004
5th Le Samyn
6th Schaal Sels
7th GP Rudy Dhaenens
