= 1995 Giro d'Italia =

Race details
- Dates: 13 May — 4 June 1995
- Stages: 22
- Distance: 3,736 km (2,321 mi)
- Winning time: 97h 39' 50"

Results
Jersey awarded to the overall winner	Winner	Tony Rominger (SUI)	(Mapei–GB–Latexco)
	Second	Evgeni Berzin (RUS)	(Gewiss–Ballan)
	Third	Pēteris Ugrjumovs (LAT)	(Gewiss–Ballan)
Jersey awarded to the points classification winner	Points	Tony Rominger (SUI)	(Mapei–GB–Latexco)
Jersey awarded to the mountains classification winner	Mountains	Mariano Piccoli (ITA)	(Brescialat–Fago)
Jersey awarded to the intergiro classification winner	Intergiro	Tony Rominger (SUI)	(Mapei–GB–Latexco)
	Team	Gewiss–Ballan	
	Team points	Gewiss–Ballan	

The 1995 Giro d'Italia took place in May and June 1995. It was the 78th edition of the event. The Giro began on 13 May with a stage that began in Perugia and ended Terni. The race came to a close on 4 June with a stage that ended in the Italian city of Milan. The race was won by the Swiss Tony Rominger of the Mapei–GB–Latexco team. Second and third were the Russian rider Evgeni Berzin and Latvian rider Piotr Ugrumov.

Mario Cipollini won the event's first leg in a bunch sprint, allowing him to be the first rider to don the race leader's maglia rosa (English: pink jersey). The following stage was an individual time trial that was won by Rominger, who also gained enough time on Cipollini to take the race lead. Rominger built upon his lead by winning the remaining two time trial stages, along with the hilly stage 4, and retained the lead for the duration of the race. By winning the Giro he became the third Swiss rider to win the event.

In addition to the general classification, Tony Rominger also won the points and intergiro classifications. Brescialat–Fago rider Mariano Piccoli won the mountains classification. Gewiss–Ballan finished as the winners of the team classification. The team points classification, a system in which the teams' riders are awarded points for placing within the top twenty in each stage and the points are then totaled for each team, was also won by Gewiss–Ballan.

== Teams ==
A total of 22 teams were invited to participate in the 1995 Giro d'Italia. Each team sent a squad of nine riders, so the Giro began with a peloton of 198 cyclists. Italy had the most riders participating with 85, while only Spain (28) and France (15) were represented by more than 10 riders. Of these, 81 were riding the Giro d'Italia for the first time. The average age of riders was 27.76 years, ranging from 19–year–old Sandro Giacomelli (Amore & Vita–Galatron) to 35–year–old Giancarlo Perini (Brescialat–Fago). The team with the youngest average rider age was Navigare–Blue Storm (25), while the oldest was Mapei–GB–Latexco (29). Of the riders that started this edition of the Giro d'Italia, a total of 122 riders made it to the finish in Milan.

The teams entering the race were:

- Aki–Gipiemme
- Amore & Vita–Galatron
- Banesto
- Brescialat–Fago
- Carrera Jeans–Tassoni
- Castellblanch
- Castorama
- Ceramiche Refin–Cantina Tollo
- Festina–Lotus
- Gewiss–Ballan
- Kelme–Sureña
- Lampre–Panaria
- Mapei–GB–Latexco
- Mercatone Uno–Saeco
- MG Maglificio–Technogym
- Navigare–Blue Storm
- ONCE
- Polti–Granarolo–Santini
- Sicasal–Acral
- Team Telekom
- TVM–Polis Direct
- ZG Mobili–Selle Italia

== Pre-race favorites ==
The starting peloton included Evgeni Berzin, the 1994 winner. Berzin's team, Gewiss–Ballan, also brought Latvian Piotr Ugrumov, a two-time Grand Tour runner-up. The two riders had developed a mutual distaste for each other. El País writers Paolo Viberti and Carlos Arribas believed that Swiss rider Tony Rominger and Latvian Piotr Ugrumov were the favorites to win the race, while several named Rominger as the sole favorite. Author Bill McGann believed that Rominger and Berzin were in great form coming into the race. Specifically, Rominger returned to the Giro after a six-year absence and, more recently, coming off of a victory at the Tour de Romandie. Urgumov was seen as the primary challenger for Rominger for his performances at previous Giros and his knack for showing great form in the final week after remaining quiet in the first two weeks. Aside from Rominger and Berzin, El Punt's Luis Simon named 1988 winner Andrew Hampsten, Russian Pavel Tonkov, and Claudio Chiappucci amongst several other riders that could challenge for the overall title.

Italian Marco Pantani was seen by some to be a contender for to win the race. However, Pantani crashed during a training ride on 1 May and did not recover in time to participate. Two-time winner Miguel Induráin chose not to enter the race in favor of preparing for the Tour de France. Instead, Indurain rode the Critérium du Dauphiné Libéré. Twelve of the UCI Road World Cup top 20 ranked cyclists did not compete in the Giro d'Italia.

== Route and stages ==
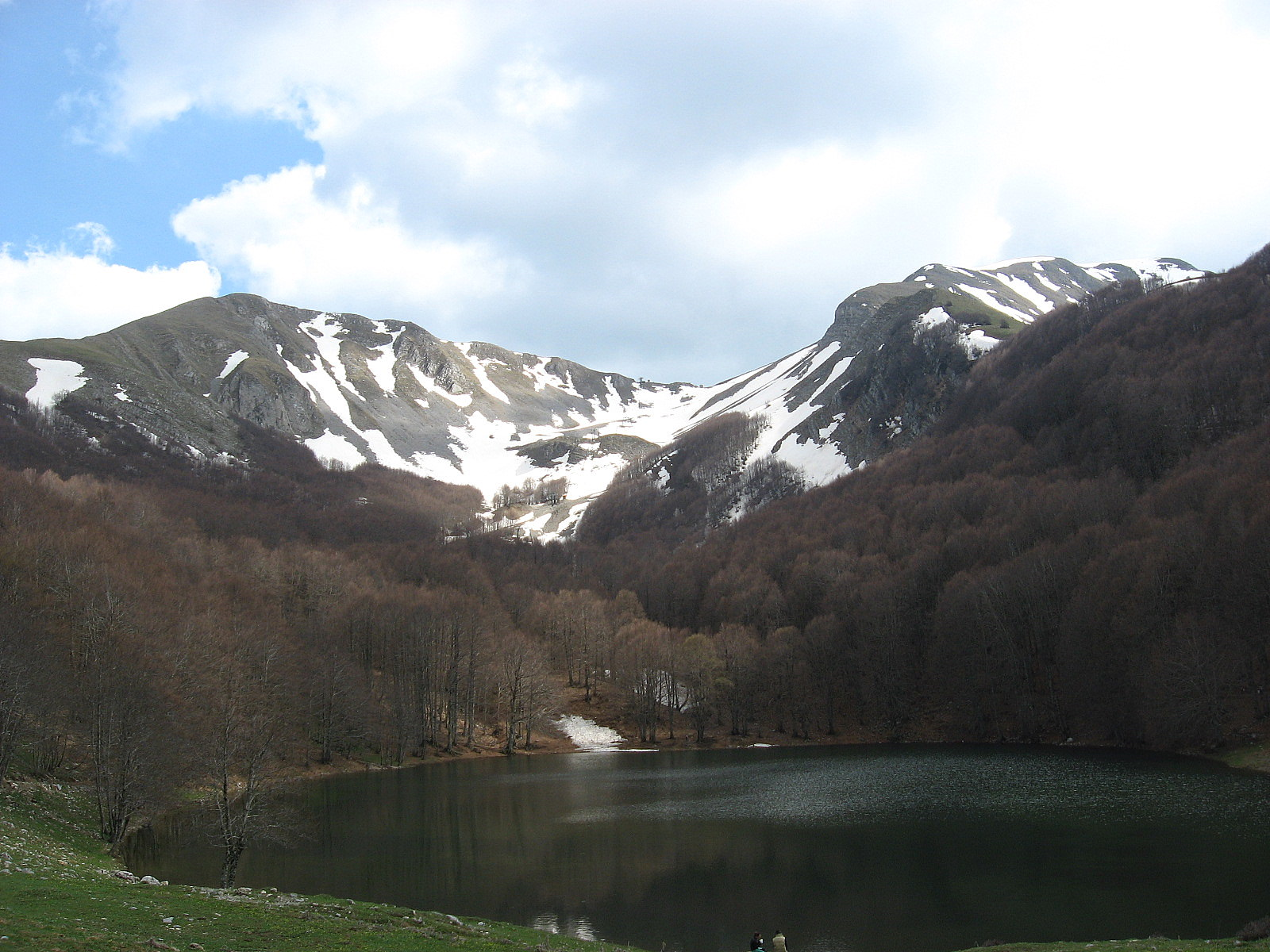
Massiccio del Sirino (pictured) hosted the finish of the 209 km (130 mi) eighth stage that began in Acquappesa.

The route for the 1995 Giro d'Italia was unveiled by race director Carmine Castellano on 12 November 1994 in Milan. It contained three time trial events, all of which were individual. There were thirteen stages containing high mountains, of which five had summit finishes: stage 8, to Massiccio del Sirino; stage 11, to Il Ciocco; stage 14, to Schnals; stage 15, to Lenzerheide; and stage 20, to Gressoney-Saint-Jean. The organizers chose to include one rest day. When compared to the previous year's race, the race was 6 km (4 mi) longer, contained one more rest day, and the same number of stages. The nineteenth stage was regarded as the queen stage as it featured the climbs of the Col Agnel, Col d'Izoard, and Colle di Sampeyre.

The race route began in Perugia and traveled throughout the southern half of Italy for the first ten stages. After the stage 10 individual time trial, the riders were transferred to Tuscany by airplane, where the race remained in the northern half of the country and proceeded to cross into the higher and tougher mountains. There were a total of three stages that started outside Italy. Stage 15 ended in the Swiss city Lenzerheide and served as the start for the race's sixteenth stage. The mountainous twentieth stage began in the French city of Briançon.

The nineteenth stage was originally planned to stretch from Mondovì to Briançon over 202 km (126 mi). The stage finish was moved to part way up the ascent of the Col Agnel, due to avalanches. The stage finished in Pontechianale where the day's intermediate sprint had been planned after 129.9 km (81 mi) of racing. The avalanche trapped several fans that had gotten their earlier, along with their cars. Ten spectators were injured and two were taken to the hospital.

Chiappucci believed that the descents of the mountains included in the race were very difficult. An El País writer found the route to be more mountainous than in years past. In addition, the writer mentioned that the increase in mountains within the route coupled with the reduced number of time trial kilometers, including the lack of a prologue, favored Marco Pantani. Three-time winner Gino Bartali believed that the route for the Giro was harder than the same year's Tour de France course.

Stage characteristics and results
Stage	Date	Course	Distance	Type	Winner
1	13 May	Perugia to Terni	205 km (127 mi)	Stage with mountain(s)	Mario Cipollini (ITA)
2	14 May	Foligno to Assisi	19 km (12 mi)	Individual time trial	Tony Rominger (SUI)
3	15 May	Spoleto to Marotta	161 km (100 mi)	Plain stage	Mario Cipollini (ITA)
4	16 May	Mondolfo to Loreto	192 km (119 mi)	Stage with mountain(s)	Tony Rominger (SUI)
5	17 May	Porto Recanati to Tortoreto	182 km (113 mi)	Stage with mountain(s)	Filippo Casagrande (ITA)
6	18 May	Trani to Taranto	165 km (103 mi)	Plain stage	Nicola Minali (ITA)
7	19 May	Taranto to Terme Luigiane	216 km (134 mi)	Stage with mountain(s)	Maurizio Fondriest (ITA)
8	20 May	Acquappesa to Massiccio del Sirino	209 km (130 mi)	Stage with mountain(s)	Laudelino Cubino (ESP)
9	21 May	Terme La Calda to Salerno	165 km (103 mi)	Plain stage	Rolf Sørensen (DEN)
10	22 May	Telese Terme to Maddaloni	42 km (26 mi)	Individual time trial	Tony Rominger (SUI)
	23 May	Rest day			
11	24 May	Pietrasanta to Il Ciocco	175 km (109 mi)	Stage with mountain(s)	Enrico Zaina (ITA)
12	25 May	Borgo a Mozzano to Cento	195 km (121 mi)	Plain stage	Ján Svorada (SVK) (Note: Mario Cipollini was the original winner of stage 12 but was later disqualified for having made contact with another rider, Mario Manzoni, while sprinting for the finish. He was relegated to last on the stage's placings and also fined, and second place finisher Ján Svorada was promoted to first place on the stage.)
13	26 May	Pieve di Cento to Rovereto	218 km (135 mi)	Stage with mountain(s)	Pascal Richard (SUI)
14	27 May	Trento to Schnals	240 km (149 mi)	Stage with mountain(s)	Oliverio Rincón (COL)
15	28 May	Schnals to Lenzerheide (Switzerland)	185 km (115 mi)	Stage with mountain(s)	Mariano Piccoli (ITA)
16	29 May	Lenzerheide (Switzerland) to Treviglio	224 km (139 mi)	Stage with mountain(s)	Giuseppe Citterio (ITA) (Note: Giovanni Lombardi was the original winner of stage 16. During the sprint, Mario Manzoni made deliberate contact with Lombardi's bike with his hand, which broke the rule of not removing your hands from the handlebars in the final two hundred meters. Lombardi then cornered Manzoni against the railing, which also isn't allowed. Race judge Martin Bruin made the decision to disqualify both and give Giuseppe Citterio, the second placed rider, the stage victory.)
17	30 May	Cenate Sotto to Selvino	43 km (27 mi)	Individual time trial	Tony Rominger (SUI)
18	31 May	Stradella to Sanctuary of Vicoforte	221 km (137 mi)	Plain stage	Denis Zanette (ITA)
19	1 June	Mondovì to Pontechianale	130 km (81 mi)	Stage with mountain(s)	Pascal Richard (SUI)
20	2 June	Briançon (France) to Gressoney-Saint-Jean	208 km (129 mi)	Stage with mountain(s)	Serhiy Ushakov (UKR)
21	3 June	Pont-Saint-Martin to Luino	190 km (118 mi)	Stage with mountain(s)	Evgeni Berzin (RUS)
22	4 June	Luino to Milan	148 km (92 mi)	Plain stage	Giovanni Lombardi (ITA)
	Total		3,736 km (2,321 mi)		

== Race overview ==
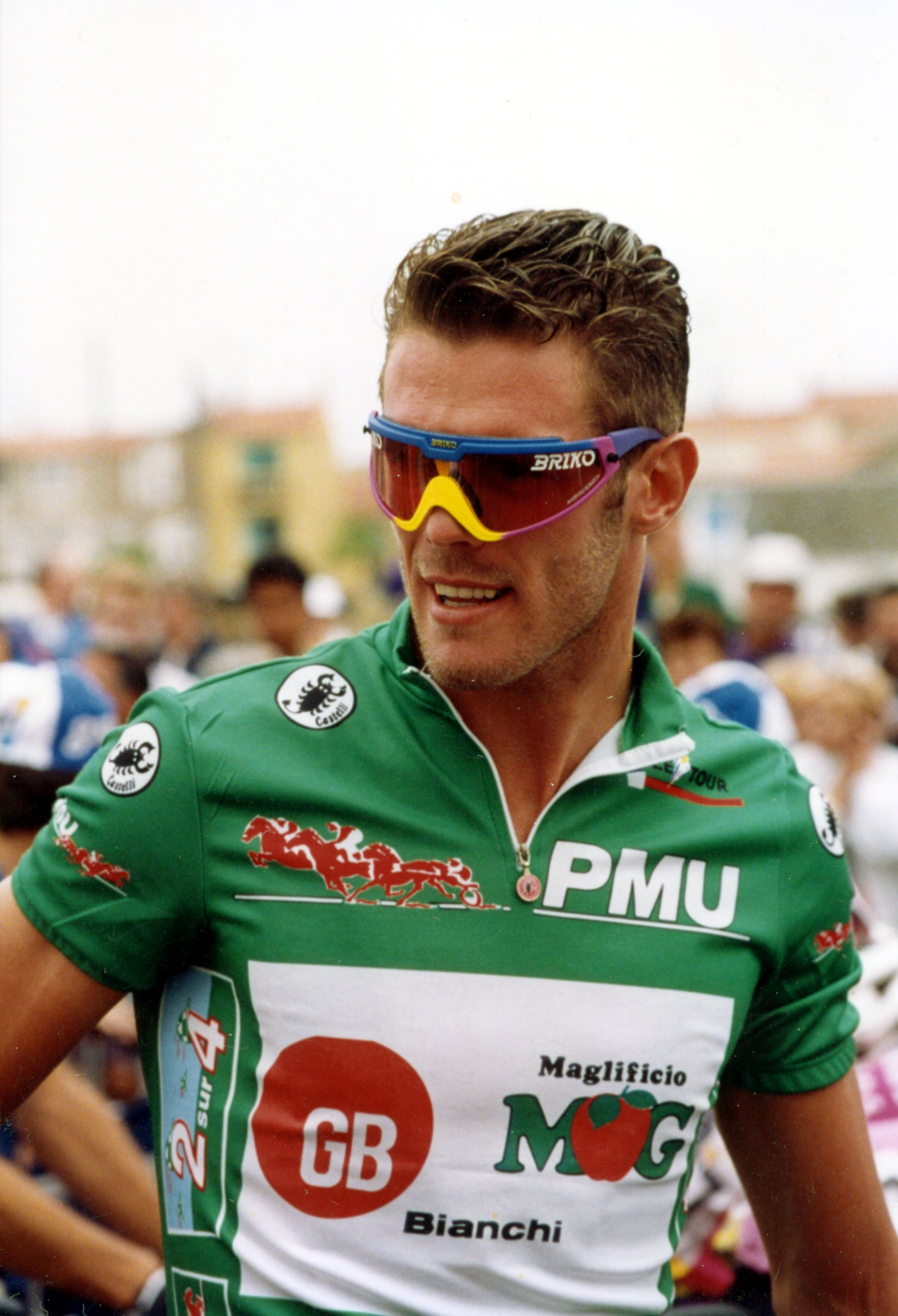
Mario Cipollini (pictured at the 1993 Tour de France) won two stages at this edition of the Giro.

Mario Cipollini won the race's opening stage by several bike lengths to don the race's first maglia rosa (English: pink jersey). Cipollini lost the lead to Tony Rominger following the stage 2 individual time trial that was contested in rainy conditions. Rominger was able to gain almost a minute on each of the main general classification contenders including Piotr Ugrumov and Evgeni Berzin. The third stage was Cipollini's second stage victory as he won the bunch sprint. The fourth stage was contested on a set circuit that was covered four times. The day's breakaway managed to get a maximum of 14' 25" before gradually being pulled in. Claudio Chiappucci attacked on the final lap but was pulled back in by the chasing peloton. Ugrumov, Berzin, and Berzin's teammate Vladislav Bobrik then attacked and managed to form a gap. Rominger chased after and caught the riders, then passed them and went on to win the stage.

The event's fifth leg saw a breakaway succeed; the group began with five riders and was reduced to three riders – Erik Breukink, Filippo Casagrande, and Rolf Sørensen – before the finish. Casagrande won the three-man sprint to the line to take the day. The sixth stage resulted in a field sprint that was won by Nicola Minali. The seventh stage featured an undulating stage profile, with a slight uphill finish. On the race's final incline, Rominger attacked but his move was marked by several general classification contenders. Maurizio Fondriest managed to edge out Rominger in a dash for the line which saw him gain four seconds on Rominger due to time bonuses. The eighth stage featured the first summit finish of the race, to Massiccio del Sirino. The day's breakaway was established early on in the day and managed to reach the final climb before the pursuing peloton. Stage winner Laudelino Cubino attacked with eight kilometers to go and rode solo until the finish; the time he gained during the stage allowed him to move into third overall.

The ninth day of racing resulted in a bunch sprint that was won by Sørensen. The next stage of the race was a forty-two kilometer individual time trial. Race leader Rominger won the leg by one minute and twenty-four seconds and increased his overall lead to three minutes over Casagrande, who was in second place overall. Enrico Zaina and Nelson Rodríguez Serna were the first two riders to reach the stage's final climb of Il Cioccio and the two stayed out in front until the finish which saw Zaina win the race to the line. With four kilometers left in the stage, Ugrumov and Berzin attempted to crack Rominger by attacking him repeatedly. After several attacks where the riders moves were marked, the riders agreed to ride to the finish together. The twelfth stage of the race saw the peloton arrive at the finish together ready for a bunch sprint. Cipollini originally won the stage but was relegated to last place on the stage after having been found to have leaned on Mario Manzoni during the dash to the line. Ján Svorada, who had come in second, was then made the stage winner.

The thirteenth stage saw the race begin to enter the smaller mountains within the Dolomites. The day's breakaway formed on the climb of San Valentino. As the riders approached the finish, Pascal Richard edged Oliverio Rincón for the stage victory. The following stage featured a summit finish to Val Senales after a twenty kilometer climb. With eight kilometers to go, Berzin, Rominger, Ugrumov, and Rincón were in the leading group together. Rincón attacked and was allowed to ride solo to victory. Ugrumov attacked shortly after and Rominger was only able to follow initially; however, Berzin was able to merge back with the two riders and the trio then rode to the finish together. Casagrande lost a large amount of time during the stage. Mariano Piccoli won the fifteenth leg after being a part of the day's breakaway that managed to survive until the finish. On the descent of the second to last climb, Berzin attacked in an attempt to join the breakaway. Berzin was caught before the start of the stage's final mountain pass. Ugrumov and Berzin repeatedly attacked Rominger on the final climb, but Rominger was able to neutralize each attack.

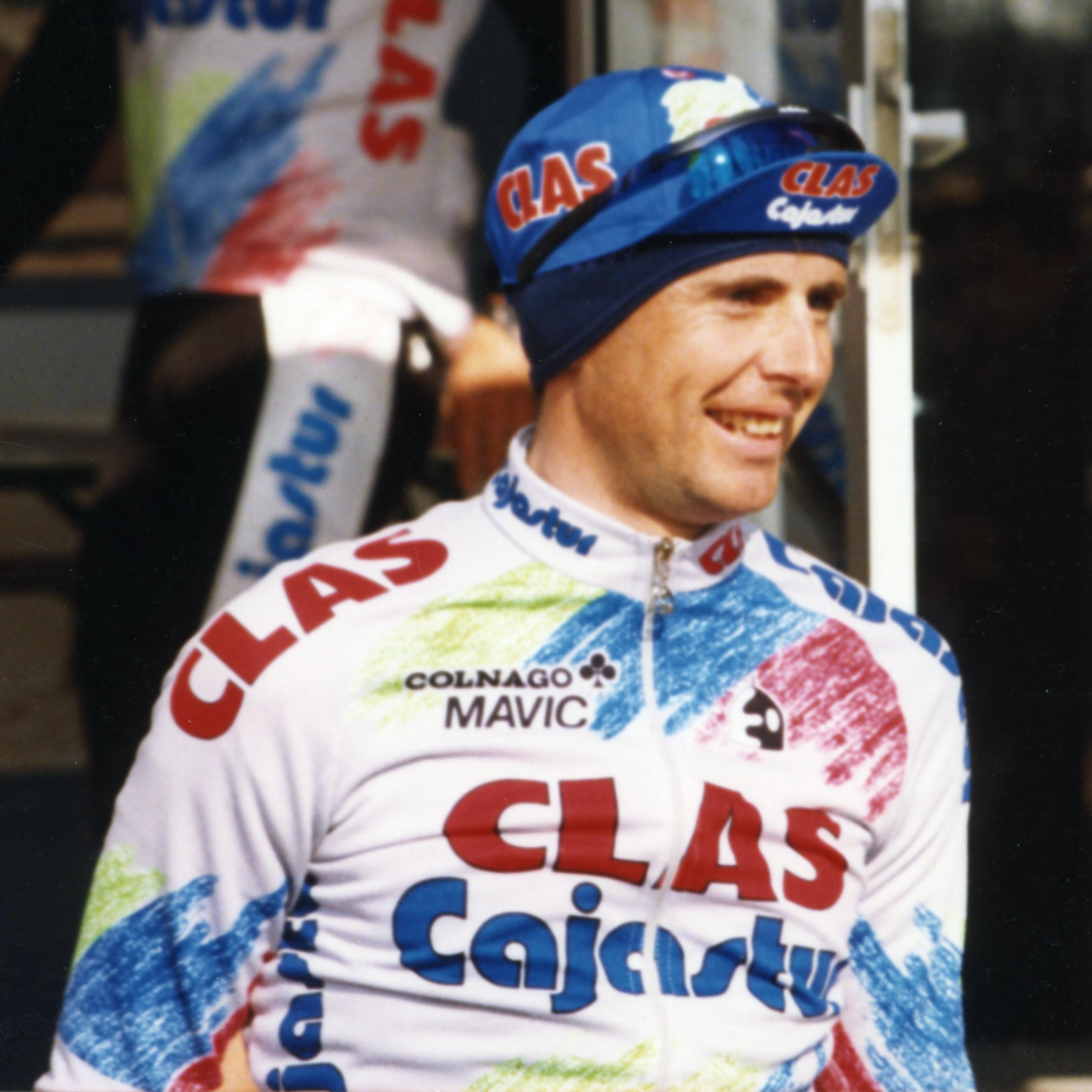
Tony Rominger (pictured at the 1993 Paris–Nice) won four stages en route to winning the race as a whole.

The sixteenth leg was a downhill stage from the Swiss Alps. A breakaway did form but was caught before the run into the finish as the peloton prepared for a sprint finish. The stage was initially won by Giovanni Lombardi, but he was deemed by race judges to have had an irregular sprint and the victory was awarded to the second placed rider Giuseppe Citterio. The next day consisted of a climbing time trial to Selvino. Rominger extended his advantage over all his competitors by winning the stage by a margin of one minute and thirty-nine seconds over Berzin. The eighteenth stage was plagued by rainy conditions throughout the undulating course. The day's breakaway consisted of sixteen riders, which Tony Rominger's Mapei team chose not to chase down. Denis Zanette and Giuseppe Guerini formed an attack group from the breakaway and rode into the finish where Zanette managed to edge out Guerini for the win. The main contenders did not have any time gaps during the stage, leaving the general classification unchanged.

The nineteenth leg saw a breakaway of nine riders form off the front of the peloton. While racing, the finish line of the stage was moved to Pontechinale, a location that was part way up the climb of the Col Agnel because several avalanches occurred near the summit and prevented the riders from passing. Richard was the first rider to reach the new finish line and thus won his second stage. Serguei Outschakov won the following stage after being a part of the day's breakaway that dwindled as the stage wore on; he out-raced the only other remaining member Richard to win the stage. Behind, Urgrumov attacked and was only marked by both Berzin and Rincon, while Rominger trailed behind. Berzin and Ugrumov refused to work with one another and did not extend their advantage over Rominger. Rominger wound up losing minimal time. The race's penultimate stage was marred by rain. On the second ascension of the Cuvignone, Berzin attacked and was able to distance himself; however, he gave up the attack near the summit. He attacked again on the race's final climb of Salita di Montegrino Valtravaglia. Berzin rode solo to win the stage and managed to gain twenty-five seconds on Ugrumov and Rominger. The final leg of the race was decided through a bunch sprint that was won by Giovanni Lombardi. Rominger became the third Swiss rider to win the Giro.

Three riders achieved multiple stage victories: Cipollini (stages 1 and 3), Rominger (stages 2, 4, 10, and 17), and Richard (stages 13 and 19). Stage wins were achieved by eleven of the twenty-one competing squads, eight of which won multiple stages. Mapei–GB–Latexco had four stage wins through Rominger. MG Maglificio–Technogym won a total of three stage wins with Richard and Rolf Sörensen (stage 9). Six teams won two stages. These were Mercatone Uno–Saeco (through Cipollini), Lampre–Panaria (Fondriest on stage 7 and Svorada on stage 12), Brescialat (Casagrande on stage 5 and Piccoli on stage 15), Aki–Gipiemme (Citterio on stage 16 and Zanette on stage 18), Gewiss–Ballan (Minali on stage 6 and Berzin on stage 21), and Polti–Granarolo–Santini (Outschakov on stage 20 and Lombardi on stage 22). Kelme-Sureña, Carrera Jeans–Tassoni, and ONCE each won a single stage at the Giro, through Cubino (stage 8), Zaina (stage 11), and Rincón (stage 14), respectively.

== Classification leadership ==
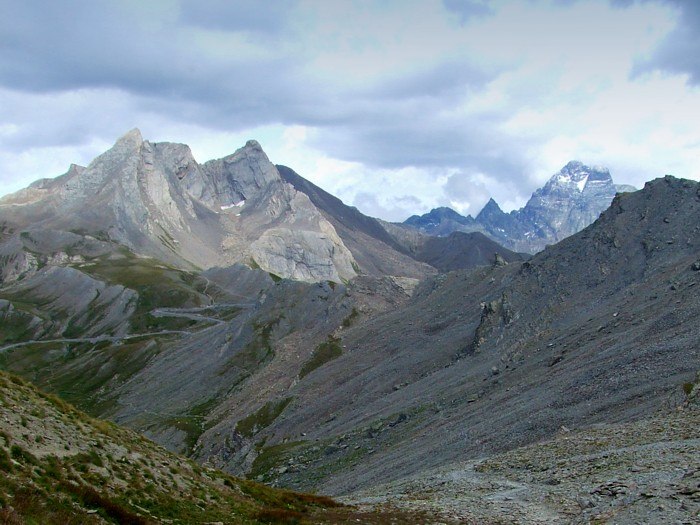
The Col Agnel was the Cima Coppi for the 1995 Giro d'Italia.

Four different jerseys were worn during the 1995 Giro d'Italia. The leader of the general classification – calculated by adding the stage finish times of each rider, and allowing time bonuses for the first three finishers on mass-start stages – wore a pink jersey. This classification is the most important of the race, and its winner is considered as the winner of the Giro.

For the points classification, which awarded a purple (or cyclamen) jersey to its leader, cyclists were given points for finishing a stage in the top 15; additional points could also be won in intermediate sprints. The green jersey was awarded to the mountains classification leader. In this ranking, points were won by reaching the summit of a climb ahead of other cyclists. Each climb was ranked as either first, second or third category, with more points available for higher category climbs. The Cima Coppi, the race's highest point of elevation, awarded more points than the other first category climbs. The Cima Coppi for this Giro was the Col Agnel, but it was not climbed due to avalanches that prevented the riders from being able to pass on the roads. The intergiro classification was marked by a blue jersey. The calculation for the intergiro is similar to that of the general classification, in each stage there is a midway point that the riders pass through a point and where their time is stopped. As the race goes on, their times compiled and the person with the lowest time is the leader of the intergiro classification and wears the blue jersey.

Although no jersey was awarded, there was also a classification for the teams, in which the stage finish times of the best three cyclists per team were added; the leading team was the one with the lowest total time. There was another team classification that awarded points to each team based on their riding's finishing position in every stage. The team with the highest total of points was the leader of the classification.

The rows in the following table correspond to the jerseys awarded after that stage was run.

Classification leadership by stage
Stage	Winner	General classification	Points classification	Mountains classification	Team classification
1	Mario Cipollini	Mario Cipollini	Mario Cipollini	Giuseppe Guerini	Mercatone Uno–Saeco
2	Tony Rominger	Tony Rominger	Rolf Sørensen	Giuseppe Guerini	Lampre–Panaria
3	Mario Cipollini	Tony Rominger	Mario Cipollini	Mariano Piccoli	Lampre–Panaria
4	Tony Rominger	Tony Rominger	Mario Cipollini	Mariano Piccoli	Lampre–Panaria
5	Filippo Casagrande	Tony Rominger	Mario Cipollini	Mariano Piccoli	Brescialat
6	Nicola Minali	Tony Rominger	Mario Cipollini	Mariano Piccoli	Brescialat
7	Maurizio Fondriest	Tony Rominger	Mario Cipollini	Mariano Piccoli	Brescialat
8	Laudelino Cubino	Tony Rominger	Mario Cipollini	Mariano Piccoli	MG Maglificio–Technogym
9	Rolf Sørensen	Tony Rominger	Mario Cipollini	Mariano Piccoli	MG Maglificio–Technogym
10	Tony Rominger	Tony Rominger	Tony Rominger	Mariano Piccoli	Gewiss–Ballan
11	Enrico Zaina	Tony Rominger	Tony Rominger	Mariano Piccoli	Gewiss–Ballan
12	Ján Svorada	Tony Rominger	Tony Rominger	Mariano Piccoli	Gewiss–Ballan
13	Pascal Richard	Tony Rominger	Tony Rominger	Mariano Piccoli	Gewiss–Ballan
14	Oliverio Rincón	Tony Rominger	Tony Rominger	Mariano Piccoli	Gewiss–Ballan
15	Mariano Piccoli	Tony Rominger	Tony Rominger	Mariano Piccoli	Gewiss–Ballan
16	Giuseppe Citterio	Tony Rominger	Tony Rominger	Mariano Piccoli	Gewiss–Ballan
17	Tony Rominger	Tony Rominger	Tony Rominger	Mariano Piccoli	Gewiss–Ballan
18	Denis Zanette	Tony Rominger	Tony Rominger	Mariano Piccoli	Gewiss–Ballan
19	Pascal Richard	Tony Rominger	Tony Rominger	Mariano Piccoli	Gewiss–Ballan
20	Serguei Outschakov	Tony Rominger	Tony Rominger	Mariano Piccoli	Gewiss–Ballan
21	Evgeni Berzin	Tony Rominger	Tony Rominger	Mariano Piccoli	Gewiss–Ballan
22	Giovanni Lombardi	Tony Rominger	Tony Rominger	Mariano Piccoli	Gewiss–Ballan
Final		Tony Rominger	Tony Rominger	Mariano Piccoli	Gewiss–Ballan

== Final standings ==
Legend
Pink jersey	Denotes the winner of the General classification	Green jersey	Denotes the winner of the Mountains classification
Purple jersey	Denotes the winner of the Points classification	Blue jersey	Denotes the winner of the Intergiro classification

=== General classification ===
Final general classification (1–10)
	Rider	Team	Time
1	Tony Rominger (SUI)	Mapei–GB–Latexco	100h 41' 21"
2	Evgeni Berzin (RUS)	Gewiss–Ballan	+ 4' 13"
3	Piotr Ugrumov (LAT)	Gewiss–Ballan	+ 4' 55"
4	Claudio Chiappucci (ITA)	Carrera Jeans–Tassoni	+ 9' 23"
5	Oliverio Rincón (COL)	ONCE	+ 10' 03"
6	Pavel Tonkov (RUS)	Lampre–Panaria	+ 11' 31"
7	Enrico Zaina (ITA)	Carrera Jeans–Tassoni	+ 13' 40"
8	Heinz Imboden (SUI)	Ceramiche Refin–Cantina Tollo	+ 16' 23"
9	Georg Totschnig (AUT)	Polti–Granarolo–Santini	+ 18' 05"
10	Francesco Casagrande (ITA)	Mercatone Uno–Saeco	+ 18' 50"

=== Points classification ===
Final points classification (1–5)
	Rider	Team	Points
1	Tony Rominger (SUI)	Mapei–GB–Latexco	205
2	Rolf Sørensen (DEN)	MG Maglificio–Technogym	153
3	Evgeni Berzin (RUS)	Gewiss–Ballan	148
4	Piotr Ugrumov (LAT)	Gewiss–Ballan	145
5	Giovanni Fidanza (ITA)	Polti–Granarolo–Santini	121

=== Mountains classification ===
Final mountains classification (1–5)
	Rider	Team	Points
1	Mariano Piccoli (ITA)	Brescialat	75
2	Nelson Rodríguez Serna (COL)	ZG Mobili–Selle Italia	45
3	Giuseppe Guerini (ITA)	Gewiss Playbus	43
4	Evgeni Berzin (RUS)	Gewiss–Ballan	33
5	Oliverio Rincón (COL)	ONCE	28

=== Intergiro classification ===
Final intergiro classification (1–3)
	Rider	Team	Time
1	Tony Rominger (SUI)	Mapei–GB–Latexco	59h 36' 45"
2	Giovanni Fidanza (ITA)	Polti–Granarolo–Santini	+ 54"
3	Evgeni Berzin (RUS)	Gewiss–Ballan	+ 1' 24"

=== Team classification ===
Final team classification (1–5)
	Team	Time
1	Gewiss–Ballan	293h 08' 42"
2	Mapei–GB–Latexco	+ 54' 57"
3	Carrera Jeans–Tassoni	+ 1h 09' 43"
4	MG Maglificio–Technogym	+ 1h 31' 27"
5	Brescialat	+ 1h 46' 09"

=== Team points classification ===
Final team points classification (1–5)
	Team	Points
1	Gewiss–Ballan	631
2	Carrera Jeans–Tassoni	378
3	MG Maglificio–Technogym	367
4	Mercatone Uno–Saeco	334
5	Lampre–Panaria	321
