= 1993 Omloop Het Volk =

Race details
- Dates: 27 February 1993
- Stages: 1
- Distance: 202 km (126 mi)
- Winning time: 5h 11' 00"

Results
	Winner	Wilfried Nelissen (BEL)
	Second	Olaf Ludwig (GER)
	Third	Eric Vanderaerden (BEL)

The 1993 Omloop Het Volk was the 47th edition of the Omloop Het Volk cycle race and was held on 27 February 1993. The race started and finished in Ghent. The race was won by Wilfried Nelissen.

== General classification ==
Final general classification
Rank	Rider	Time
1	Wilfried Nelissen (BEL)	5h 11' 00"
2	Olaf Ludwig (GER)	+ 8"
3	Eric Vanderaerden (BEL)	+ 8"
4	Mario De Clercq (BEL)	+ 8"
5	Johan Capiot (BEL)	+ 8"
6	Mario Cipollini (ITA)	+ 8"
7	Frankie Andreu (USA)	+ 8"
8	Kai Hundertmarck (GER)	+ 8"
9	Laurent Brochard (FRA)	+ 8"
10	Thierry Gouvenou (FRA)	+ 8"
