= Giuseppe Citterio =

Italian cyclist

Personal information
- Full name: Giuseppe Citterio
- Born: 27 March 1967 (age 59) Seregno, Italy

Cycling career
- Sport: Cycling
- Discipline: Road
- Role: rider

Professional teams
- 1990: Malvor–Sidi
- 1991–1993: ZG Mobili–Bottecchia
- 1994: S.E.F.B.–Fraser–Cicli Moser
- 1995–1996: Aki–Gipiemme

Giuseppe Citterio (born 27 March 1967) is an Italian former racing cyclist. He competed as a professional from 1990 to 1996. He competed in two editions of the Tour de France, four of the Giro d'Italia as well as the 1996 Vuelta a España. He most notably won a stage of the 1995 Giro d'Italia as well as the Classic Haribo the same year.

== Major results ==
1990
2nd Milano–Vignola
10th Giro dell'Etna
1991
2nd Giro dell'Etna
1992
1st Stage 3b Hofbrau Cup
1993
3rd Scheldeprijs
1995
1st Classic Haribo
1st Stage 16 Giro d'Italia
1996
1st Stage 3 Volta a la Comunitat Valenciana
9th Paris–Tours

=== Grand Tour general classification results timeline ===
Grand Tour	1990	1991	1992	1993	1994	1995	1996
Giro d'Italia	DNF	DNF	—	—	—	107	DNF
Tour de France	—	—	—	DNF	—	DNF	—
Vuelta a España	—	—	—	—	—	—	107
