= 1991 Scheldeprijs =

Race details
- Dates: 21 April 1991
- Stages: 1
- Distance: 205 km (127.4 mi)
- Winning time: 4h 29' 00"

Results
	Winner	Mario Cipollini (ITA)	(Del Tongo–MG Boys)
	Second	Jan Bogaert (BEL)	(Collstrop–Isoglass)
	Third	Johan Capiot (BEL)	(TVM–Sanyo)

The 1991 Scheldeprijs was the 78th edition of the Scheldeprijs cycle race and was held on 21 April 1991. The race was won by Mario Cipollini of the Del Tongo team.

== General classification ==
Final general classification

Rank	Rider	Team	Time
1	Mario Cipollini (ITA)	Del Tongo–MG Boys	4h 29' 00"
2	Jan Bogaert (BEL)	Collstrop–Isoglass	+ 0"
3	Johan Capiot (BEL)	TVM–Sanyo	+ 0"
4	Johan Museeuw (BEL)	Lotto	+ 0"
5	Carlo Bomans (BEL)	Weinmann–EVS	+ 0"
6	John Talen (NED)	PDM–Concorde–Ultima	+ 0"
7	Benny Van Brabant (BEL)	SEFB–Saxon	+ 0"
8	Marnix Lameire (BEL)	SEFB–Saxon	+ 0"
9	Willy Willems (BEL)	Collstrop–Isoglass	+ 0"
10	Edwin Bafcop (BEL)	Collstrop–Isoglass	+ 0"
