= 1992 Gent–Wevelgem =

- Official poster of the event

Race details
- Dates: 8 April 1992
- Stages: 1
- Distance: 210 km (130 mi)
- Winning time: 4h 49' 00"

Results
	Winner	Mario Cipollini (ITA)	(GB–MG Maglificio)
	Second	Johan Capiot (BEL)	(TVM–Sanyo)
	Third	Adriano Baffi (ITA)	(Ariostea)

The 1992 Gent–Wevelgem was the 54th edition of the Belgian Gent–Wevelgem cycle race and was held on 8 April 1992. The race started in Ghent and finished in Wevelgem. The race was won by Mario Cipollini of the GB–MG Maglificio team.

== General classification ==
Final general classification (Note: Djamolidine Abdoujaparov finished first, but was disqualified for an irregular sprint.)

Rank	Rider	Team	Time
1	Mario Cipollini (ITA)	GB–MG Maglificio	4h 49' 00"
2	Johan Capiot (BEL)	TVM–Sanyo	+ 0"
3	Adriano Baffi (ITA)	Ariostea	+ 0"
4	Jean-Paul van Poppel (NED)	PDM–Ultima–Concorde	+ 0"
5	Jelle Nijdam (NED)	Buckler–Colnago–Decca	+ 0"
6	Uwe Raab (GER)	PDM–Ultima–Concorde	+ 0"
7	Johan Museeuw (BEL)	Lotto–Mavic–MBK	+ 0"
8	Olaf Ludwig (GER)	Panasonic–Sportlife	+ 0"
9	Giovanni Fidanza (ITA)	Gatorade–Chateau d'Ax	+ 0"
10	Nico Verhoeven (NED)	PDM–Ultima–Concorde	+ 0"
