= 1994 Scheldeprijs =

Race details
- Dates: 13 April 1994
- Stages: 1
- Distance: 195 km (121.2 mi)
- Winning time: 4h 44' 00"

Results
| | Winner | Peter Van Petegem (BEL) |
| | Second | Dirk De Wolf (BEL) |
| | Third | Djamolidine Abdoujaparov (UZB) |

The 1994 Scheldeprijs was the 81st edition of the Scheldeprijs cycle race and was held on 13 April 1994. The race was won by Peter Van Petegem.

== General classification ==
Final general classification

| Rank | Rider | Time |
|---|---|---|
| 1 | Peter Van Petegem (BEL) | 4h 44' 00" |
| 2 | Dirk De Wolf (BEL) | + 6" |
| 3 | Djamolidine Abdoujaparov (UZB) | + 14" |
| 4 | Adriano Baffi (ITA) | + 14" |
| 5 | Jelle Nijdam (NED) | + 14" |
| 6 | Hendrik Redant (BEL) | + 14" |
| 7 | Michel Cornelisse (NED) | + 14" |
| 8 | Silvio Martinello (ITA) | + 14" |
| 9 | Michel Vanhaecke (BEL) | + 14" |
| 10 | Wim Omloop (BEL) | + 14" |
