= 1992 Scheldeprijs =

Race details
- Dates: 22 April 1992
- Stages: 1
- Distance: 204 km (127 mi)
- Winning time: 4h 42' 00"

Results
	Winner	Wilfried Nelissen (BEL)
	Second	Johan Museeuw (BEL)
	Third	Michel Cornelisse (NED)

The 1992 Scheldeprijs was the 79th edition of the Scheldeprijs cycle race and was held on 22 April 1992. The race was won by Wilfried Nelissen.

== General classification ==
Final general classification

Rank	Rider	Time
1	Wilfried Nelissen (BEL)	4h 42' 00"
2	Johan Museeuw (BEL)	+ 0"
3	Michel Cornelisse (NED)	+ 0"
4	Jean-Pierre Heynderickx (BEL)	+ 0"
5	Johan Capiot (BEL)	+ 0"
6	Etienne De Wilde (BEL)	+ 0"
7	Giovanni Fidanza (ITA)	+ 0"
8	Wiebren Veenstra (NED)	+ 0"
9	Benny Van Brabant (BEL)	+ 0"
10	Alain Van Den Bossche (BEL)	+ 0"
