= Giro dell'Etna =

Race details
- Date: March
- Region: Sicily, Italy
- Discipline: Road
- Type: One-day race

History
- First edition: 1980
- Editions: 21
- Final edition: 2004
- First winner: Wladimiro Panizza (ITA)
- Most wins: Francesco Moser (ITA) (3 wins)
- Final winner: Leonardo Bertagnolli (ITA)

The Giro dell'Etna was a one-day road cycling race held annually in Sicily, Italy from 1980 until 2004.

From 2001 until its final edition 2004, the race was known as the Trofeo dell'Etna.

== Winners ==
Year	Winner	Second	Third
1980	(Italy) Wladimiro Panizza	(Italy) Claudio Bortolotto	(Italy) Salvatore Maccali
1981	(Italy) Giuseppe Saronni	(Italy) Giovanni Mantovani	(Italy) Francesco Moser
1982	(Italy) Wladimiro Panizza	(Italy) Franco Chioccioli	(Italy) Giuseppe Petito
1983	(Italy) Giovanni Mantovani	(Italy) Mario Noris	(Italy) Daniele Caroli
1984	(Italy) Francesco Moser	(Italy) Pierino Gavazzi	(Italy) Franco Chioccioli
1985	(Italy) Francesco Moser	(Netherlands) Johan van der Velde	(Italy) Daniele Caroli
1986	(Italy) Francesco Moser	(Italy) Silvano Ricco	(Portugal) Acácio da Silva
1987	(Italy) Adriano Baffi	(Italy) Franco Chioccioli	(Italy) Marco Saligari
1988	(Italy) Paolo Cimini	(Italy) Giuseppe Calcaterra	(Italy) Adriano Baffi
1989	(Denmark) Rolf Sørensen	(Italy) Claudio Chiappucci	(Italy) Enrico Galleschi
1990	(Italy) Adriano Baffi	(Belgium) Benny Van Brabant	(Italy) Maurizio Fondriest
1991	(Italy) Mario Cipollini	(Italy) Giuseppe Citterio	(Italy) Adriano Baffi
1992	(Italy) Stefano Colagè	(Italy) Stefano Zanini	(United States) Bart Bowen
1993	No race'		
1994	(Italy) Stefano Zanini	(Italy) Maurizio Fondriest	(Italy) Davide Rebellin
1995	(Italy) Stefano Colagè	(Italy) Roberto Petito	(Italy) Stefano Borgheresi
1996	(Italy) Fabiano Fontanelli	(Italy) Giovanni Lombardi	(Italy) Adriano Baffi
1997	(Italy) Biagio Conte	(Italy) Fabio Baldato	(Italy) Silvio Martinello
1998-00	No race		
2001	(Zimbabwe) Timothy David Jones	(Italy) Diego Ferrari	(Italy) Denis Lunghi
2002	(Italy) Fabio Baldato	(Ukraine) Mikhaylo Khalilov	(Germany) Jan Bratkowski
2003	(Italy) Filippo Pozzato	(Italy) Biagio Conte	(Italy) Mario Manzoni
2004	(Italy) Leonardo Bertagnolli	(Ukraine) Kyrylo Pospyeyev	(Colombia) Marlon Pérez
