= 1997 Gent–Wevelgem =

Race details
- Dates: 9 April 1997
- Stages: 1
- Distance: 208 km (129 mi)
- Winning time: 4h 45' 00"

Results
	Winner	Philippe Gaumont (FRA)	(Cofidis)
	Second	Andrei Tchmil (UKR)	(Lotto–Mobistar–Isoglass)
	Third	Johan Capiot (BEL)	(TVM–Farm Frites)

The 1997 Gent–Wevelgem was the 59th edition of the Belgian Gent–Wevelgem cycle race and was held on 9 April 1997. The race started in Ghent and finished in Wevelgem. The race was won by Philippe Gaumont of the Cofidis team.

== General classification ==
Final general classification

Rank	Rider	Team	Time
1	Philippe Gaumont (FRA)	Cofidis	4h 45' 00"
2	Andrei Tchmil (UKR)	Lotto–Mobistar–Isoglass	+ 0"
3	Johan Capiot (BEL)	TVM–Farm Frites	+ 0"
4	Serguei Outschakov (UKR)	Team Polti	+ 0"
5	Andrea Ferrigato (ITA)	Roslotto–ZG Mobili	+ 0"
6	Henk Vogels (AUS)	GAN	+ 0"
7	Stuart O'Grady (AUS)	GAN	+ 0"
8	Fabrizio Guidi (ITA)	Scrigno–Gaerne	+ 0"
9	Johan Museeuw (BEL)	Mapei–GB	+ 0"
10	Giuseppe Calcaterra (ITA)	Saeco–Estro	+ 0"
