= Michel Cornelisse =

Dutch cyclist

Personal information
- Born: 24 December 1965 (age 60) Amsterdam, Netherlands

Cycling career
- Sport: Cycling
- Current team: Fenix–Premier Tech; Fenix–Deceuninck Development Team
- Discipline: Road
- Role: Rider; Directeur sportif

Professional teams
- 1987–1988: Superconfex–Kwantum–Yoko–Colnago
- 1989–1990: Panasonic–Isostar–Colnago–Agu
- 1991–1993: La William
- 1994–1996: TVM–Bison Kit
- 1997: Foreldorado–Golff
- 1998–2000: Spar–RDM

Managerial teams
- 2005–2006: B&E Cycling Team
- 2008–2013: P3 Transfer–Batavus
- 2014–2015: MTN–Qhubeka
- 2016–2017: Roompot–Oranje Peloton
- 2018: SEG Racing Academy
- 2019–2023: Corendon–Circus
- 2023–2025: Fenix–Deceuninck Development Team
- 2023–2025: Fenix–Deceuninck
- 2026–: UAE Team L'Imad

Major wins
- Stage races Tour de Luxembourg (1989) One-day races and Classics Nokere Koerse (1993)

Michel Cornelisse (born 24 December 1965 in Amsterdam) is a Dutch former cyclist.

He is currently the directeur sportif of UCI Women's World Tour team Fenix–Deceuninck as well as the development squad, Fenix–Deceuninck Development Team.

== Major results ==
1985
2nd Omloop der Kempen
3rd Ronde van Drenthe
1986
1st Stage 5 Tour de Liège
1st Stage 1 Vuelta a los Valles Mineros
2nd Ronde van Drenthe
1987
1st Ster van Zwolle
1988
1st Driedaagse van West-Vlaanderen
2nd Nationale Sluitingsprijs
1989
1st Overall Tour de Luxembourg
1990
2nd De Drie Zustersteden
1991
1st Grote 1-MeiPrijs
2nd Flèche Hesbignonne
3rd Grand Prix Raymond Impanis
1992
1st Stage 7 Tour of Sweden
1st Stage 4 Tour Méditerranéen
1st De Kustpijl
2nd Nationale Sluitingsprijs
3rd Scheldeprijs
1993
1st Nokere Koerse
1st Ster van Zwolle
1st De Kustpijl
2nd Driedaagse van West-Vlaanderen
1994
2nd Nokere Koerse
2nd Omloop van het Houtland
1995
3rd Omloop van het Houtland
1996
1st Grote 1-MeiPrijs
1st Stage 4 Tour of Austria
2nd Grand Prix de Denain
3rd Nokere Koerse
1997
1st Stages 1 & 2 Teleflex Tour
1998
3rd Flèche Hesbignonne
