= Adriano Baffi =

Italian cyclist

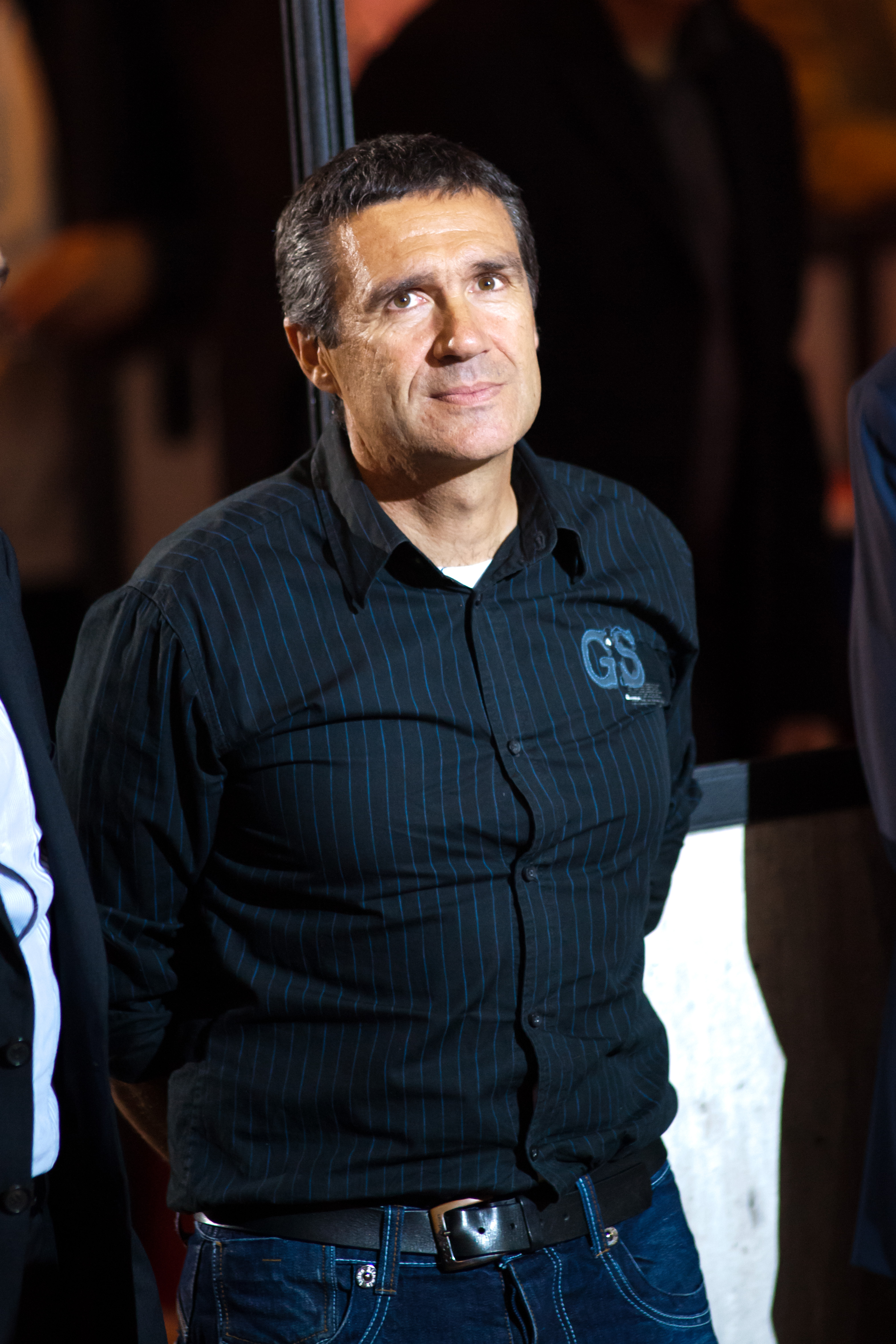
- Adriano Baffi at the Six Days of Grenoble 2011

Personal information
- Born: 7 August 1962 (age 64)
- Height: 1.76 m (5 ft 9 1/2 in)
- Weight: 70 kg (154 lb; 11 st 0 lb)

Cycling career
- Sport: Cycling
- Current team: Retired
- Discipline: Road
- Role: Rider

Professional teams
- 1985: Ariostea–Oece
- 1986–1988: Gis Gelati
- 1989–1992: Ariostea
- 1993–1994: Mercatone Uno–Zucchini–Medeghini
- 1995–1996: Mapei–GB–Latexco
- 1997: U.S. Postal Service
- 1998: Ballan
- 1999–2002: Mapei–Quick-Step

Major wins
- Grand Tours Giro d'Italia Points classification (1993) 5 individual stages (1990, 1993) Vuelta a España 1 individual stage (1995)

Adriano Baffi (born 7 August 1962) is a former Italian bicycle road racer. After his career as a rider, he became a team director. He is the son of Italian bicycle racer Pierino Baffi.

Baffi was born in Vailate, Italy. He joined the Luxembourg team Leopard Trek as a sporting director in 2011.

== Major results ==
1980
1st National Junior Kilometer Championships
1st National Junior Team Pursuit Championships
1985
8th Milano–Torino
1987
1st National Points Race Championships
1st Giro dell'Etna
1st Stage 1 Tour de Suisse
3rd Giro del Piemonte
4th Overall Settimana Internazionale di Coppi e Bartali
1988
1st National Points Race Championships
1st Overall Settimana internazionale di Coppi e Bartali

1st Stages 2 & 4

1st Milano–Vignola
1st Giro di Campania
1st Stage 5 Giro di Puglia
Tirreno–Adriatico

1st Stages 2 & 6a

2nd Criterium d'Abruzzo
3rd Giro dell'Etna
1989
1st Milano–Vignola
1st Giro della Provincia di Reggio Calabria
1st Stage 7a Paris–Nice
1st Stage 2 Settimana internazionale di Coppi e Bartali
Three Days of De Panne

1st Stages 2 & 3

3rd Milan–San Remo
5th Paris–Tours
7th Gent-Wevelgem
1990
1st Giro dell'Etna
1st Trofeo Pantalica
1st Stage 2 Giro del Trentino
1st Stage 5 Paris–Nice
1st Stage 5 Settimana internazionale di Coppi e Bartali
Giro d'Italia

1st Stages 11 & 18

4th Overall Tour of Belgium

1st Stage 2

8th Milan–San Remo
10th Paris–Tours
1991
3rd Giro dell'Etna
4th Grand Prix of Aargau Canton
1992
1st Stage 2 Giro del Trentino
1st Stage 8 Paris–Nice
3rd Gent-Wevelgem
1993
Giro d'Italia

1st Points classification
1st Stages 2, 8 & 18

6th E3 Prijs Vlaanderen
10th Gent-Wevelgem
1994
1st Trofeo Luis Puig
1st Monte Carlo–Alassio
1st Stage 1 Tirreno–Adriatico
1st Stage 1 Giro del Trentino
1st Stage 2 Vuelta a Andalucía
Ruta del Sol

1st Stages 2, 3 & 6

Setmana Catalana de Ciclisme

1st Stages 4 & 5a

3rd Milan–San Remo
4th Scheldeprijs
7th Overall Volta a la Comunitat Valenciana

1st Stages 1, 3, 4 & 5

1995
1st Overall Vuelta a Murcia

1st Stages 2 & 5 (ITT)

1st Stage 19 Vuelta a España
Ruta del Sol

1st Stages 2 & 4

2nd Overall Vuelta a Mallorca

2nd Trofeo Manacor
2nd Trofeo Pantalica
2nd Trofeo Soller
3rd Trofeo Alcudia

2nd GP Llodio
2nd Ronde van Midden-Zeeland
2nd Continental Classic
3rd Dwars door Vlaanderen
5th Overall Vuelta a Andalucía

1st Stages 2 & 4

7th Paris–Tours
1996
1st Overall Circuit de la Sarthe

1st Stages 3 & 4 (ITT)

1st Paris–Camembert
2nd Cholet-Pays de Loire
2nd Overall Giro di Sardegna

1st Stage 5

2nd Overall Settimana Internazionale di Coppi e Bartali
3rd Giro dell'Etna
1997
1st Stage 6 Paris–Nice
5th Overall Danmark Rundt
1998
9th Overall Giro di Puglia
1999
1st National Points Race Championships
2000
1st GP Zele
2001
1st Sindelfingen-Schleife
