= 1994 Omloop Het Volk =

Race details
- Dates: 26 February 1994
- Stages: 1
- Distance: 200 km (120 mi)
- Winning time: 4h 48' 00"

Results
	Winner	Wilfried Nelissen (BEL)
	Second	Frédéric Moncassin (FRA)
	Third	Andreas Kappes (GER)

The 1994 Omloop Het Volk was the 48th edition of the Omloop Het Volk cycle race and was held on 26 February 1994. The race started and finished in Ghent. The race was won by Wilfried Nelissen.

== General classification ==
Final general classification
Rank	Rider	Time
1	Wilfried Nelissen (BEL)	4h 48' 00"
2	Frédéric Moncassin (FRA)	+ 0"
3	Andreas Kappes (GER)	+ 0"
4	Johan Museeuw (BEL)	+ 0"
5	Andrei Tchmil (MDA)	+ 0"
6	Richard Virenque (FRA)	+ 0"
7	Erik Zabel (GER)	+ 0"
8	Mario De Clercq (BEL)	+ 0"
9	Johan Capiot (BEL)	+ 0"
10	Hendrik Redant (BEL)	+ 0"
