= 1990 E3 Prijs Vlaanderen =

1990 E3 Harelbeke
Race details
- Dates: 24 March 1990
- Stages: 1
- Distance: 201 km (125 mi)
- Winning time: 5h 01' 00"

Results
	Winner	Søren Lilholt (DEN)	(Histor–Sigma)
	Second	Fabio Roscioli (ITA)	(Del Tongo)
	Third	Adri van der Poel (NED)	(Weinmann–SMM–Uster)

The 1990 E3 Harelbeke was the 33rd edition of the E3 Harelbeke cycle race and was held on 24 March 1990. The race started and finished in Harelbeke. The race was won by Søren Lilholt of the Histor–Sigma team.

== General classification ==
Final general classification

Rank	Rider	Team	Time
1	Søren Lilholt (DEN)	Histor–Sigma	5h 01' 00"
2	Fabio Roscioli (ITA)	Del Tongo	+ 17"
3	Adri van der Poel (NED)	Weinmann–SMM–Uster	+ 21"
4	Jelle Nijdam (NED)	Buckler–Colnago–Decca	+ 21"
5	Wilfried Peeters (BEL)	Histor–Sigma	+ 21"
6	Hendrik Redant (BEL)	Lotto–Superclub	+ 21"
7	Gianluca Bortolami (ITA)	Diana–Colnago–Animex	+ 21"
8	Jean-Marie Wampers (BEL)	Panasonic–Sportlife	+ 21"
9	Rik Van Slycke (BEL)	Histor–Sigma	+ 21"
10	Gilbert Duclos-Lassalle (FRA)	Z–Tomasso	+ 21"
