= Alain Van Den Bossche =

Belgian cyclist

Personal information
- Full name: Alain Van Den Bossche
- Born: 17 November 1965 (age 60) Geraardsbergen, Belgium

Cycling career
- Sport: Cycling
- Role: Rider

Alain Van Den Bossche (born 17 November 1965) is a former Belgian racing cyclist. He won the Belgian national road race title in 1993.
