= Geert Van Bondt =

Belgian cyclist

Personal information
- Full name: Geert Van Bondt
- Born: 18 November 1970 (age 55) Ninove

Cycling career
- Sport: Cycling
- Current team: Retired
- Discipline: Road
- Role: Rider

Professional teams
- 1994: Trident–Schick
- 1995: Asfra–Orlans
- 1996–1997: Vlaanderen 2002
- 1998–2000: TVM–Farm Frites
- 2001: Mercury–Viatel
- 2002–2003: CSC
- 2004: Landbouwkrediet–Colnago

Major wins
- Gent–Wevelgem (2000)

Geert Van Bondt (born 18 November 1970, in Ninove) is a retired Belgian cyclist.

== Palmarès ==
1992
3rd Internationale Wielertrofee Jong Maar Moedig
1993
4th stage Tour of Belgium amateurs
2nd Tour de Wallonie
1995
3rd Nokere Koerse
1996
2nd Belgian National Road Race Championships
1997
Tour de l'Eurometropole

1st stage
3rd overall

1998
2nd Halle–Ingooigem
2000
1st Gent–Wevelgem
3rd stage Danmark Rundt
2nd Kuurne–Brussels–Kuurne
2nd E3 Harelbeke
2002
3rd stage Rheinland-Pfalz Rundfahrt
2nd Paris–Bourges
2004
2nd Flèche Hesbignonne
