= Chris Peers =

Belgian cyclist

Personal information
- Born: 3 March 1970 (age 56) Deinze, Belgium

Cycling career
- Sport: Cycling
- Current team: Retired
- Discipline: Road
- Role: Rider

Professional teams
- 1991: Tonton TAPIS - GB
- 1992–1995: Collstrop
- 1996–1999: Lotto
- 2000–2003: Cofidis
- 2004: Chocolade Jacques

Chris Peers (born 3 March 1970 in Deinze) is a Belgian former professional cyclist.

== Major results ==
1988
1st Junior National Road Race Championships
1991
1st Stages 2 & 6 Tour de Wallonie
2nd Vlaamse Pijl
1994
3rd Nokere Koerse
1996
1st Grote Prijs Stad Zottegem
1998
2nd Grote Prijs Stad Zottegem
3rd Nokere Koerse
1999
2nd Grand Prix de la Ville de Lillers
2nd Veenendaal–Veenendaal
3rd Dwars door Vlaanderen
2000
2nd Grand Prix d'Isbergues
2nd Paris–Bourges
3rd Kampioenschap van Vlaanderen
3rd E3 Harelbeke
3rd Étoile de Bessèges
5th Gent–Wevelgem
2001
1st Overall Circuit Franco-Belge

1st Stage 1

2nd Grand Prix d'Isbergues
6th Tour of Flanders
7th Gent–Wevelgem
9th Paris–Roubaix
10th Amstel Gold Race
2002
3rd Brabantse Pijl
2003
1st Omloop van de Vlaamse Scheldeboorden
