= 1995 UCI Road World Cup =

- Seventh edition of the UCI Road World Cup

Details
- Dates: 28 March – 21 October 1996
- Location: Europe
- Races: 11

Champions
- Individual champion: Johan Museeuw (BEL) (Mapei–GB–Latexco)
- Teams' champion: Mapei–GB–Latexco

The 1995 UCI Road World Cup was the seventh edition of the UCI Road World Cup. It was won by Belgian classics specialist Johan Museeuw of the Mapei–GB–Latexco team. Moldavian Andrei Tchmil ended second, Swiss Mauro Gianetti third.

== Races ==
Date	Race	Country	Winner	Team	World Cup Leader	Leader's Team	Report
18 March	Milan–San Remo	Italy	Laurent Jalabert (FRA)	ONCE	Laurent Jalabert (FRA)	ONCE	Report
2 April	Tour of Flanders	Belgium	Johan Museeuw (BEL)	Mapei–GB–Latexco	Johan Museeuw (BEL)	Mapei–GB–Latexco	Report
9 April	Paris–Roubaix	France	Franco Ballerini (ITA)	Mapei–GB–Latexco	Johan Museeuw (BEL)	Mapei–GB–Latexco	Report
16 April	Liège–Bastogne–Liège	Belgium	Mauro Gianetti (SUI)	Polti–Granarolo–Santini	Johan Museeuw (BEL)	Mapei–GB–Latexco	Report
22 April	Amstel Gold Race	Netherlands	Mauro Gianetti (SUI)	Polti–Granarolo–Santini	Mauro Gianetti (SUI)	Polti–Granarolo–Santini	Report
1 May	Rund um den Henninger Turm	Germany	Francesco Frattini (ITA)	Gewiss–Ballan	Johan Museeuw (BEL)	Mapei–GB–Latexco	Report
6 August	Leeds International Classic	Great Britain	Maximilian Sciandri (GBR)	MG Maglificio–Technogym	Johan Museeuw (BEL)	Mapei–GB–Latexco	Report
12 August	Clásica de San Sebastián	Spain	Lance Armstrong (USA)	Motorola	Johan Museeuw (BEL)	Mapei–GB–Latexco	Report
20 August	Grand Prix de Suisse	Switzerland	Johan Museeuw (BEL)	Mapei–GB–Latexco	Johan Museeuw (BEL)	Mapei–GB–Latexco	Report
15 October	Paris–Tours	France	Nicola Minali (ITA)	Gewiss–Ballan	Johan Museeuw (BEL)	Mapei–GB–Latexco	Report
21 October	Giro di Lombardia	Italy	Gianni Faresin (ITA)	Lampre–Panaria	Johan Museeuw (BEL)	Mapei–GB–Latexco	Report

== Single races details ==
worldcupjersey	Denotes the Classification Leader

In the race results the leader jersey identify the rider who wore the jersey in the race (the leader at the start of the race).

In the general classification table the jersey identify the leader after the race.

18 March 1995 — Milan-Sanremo 294 km (182.7 mi)

	Rider	Team	Time
1	Laurent Jalabert (FRA)	ONCE	6h 45' 20"
2	Maurizio Fondriest (ITA)	Lampre–Panaria	s.t.
3	Stefano Zanini (ITA)	Gewiss–Ballan	+ 4"
4	Davide Rebellin (ITA)	MG Maglificio–Technogym	s.t.
5	Michele Bartoli (ITA)	Mercatone Uno–Saeco	s.t.
6	Fabiano Fontanelli (ITA)	ZG Mobili–Selle Italia	+ 13"
7	Dimitri Konyshev (RUS)	Aki–Gipiemme	+ 14"
8	Claudio Chiappucci (ITA)	Carrera Jeans–Tassoni	+ 17"
9	Jesper Skibby (DEN)	TVM–Polis Direct	s.t.
10	Fabio Baldato (ITA)	MG Maglificio–Technogym	s.t.

General classification after Milan-Sanremo

	Rider	Team	Points
1	Laurent Jalabert (FRA)	ONCE	50
2	Maurizio Fondriest (ITA)	Lampre–Panaria	35
3	Stefano Zanini (ITA)	Gewiss–Ballan	25
4	Davide Rebellin (ITA)	MG Maglificio–Technogym	20
5	Michele Bartoli (ITA)	Mercatone Uno–Saeco	18
6	Fabiano Fontanelli (ITA)	ZG Mobili–Selle Italia	16
7	Dimitri Konyshev (RUS)	Aki–Gipiemme	14
8	Claudio Chiappucci (ITA)	Carrera Jeans–Tassoni	12
9	Jesper Skibby (DEN)	TVM–Polis Direct	10
10	Fabio Baldato (ITA)	MG Maglificio–Technogym	8

2 April 1995 — Tour of Flanders 261 km (162.2 mi)

	Rider	Team	Time
1	Johan Museeuw (BEL)	Mapei–GB–Latexco	6h 36' 24"
2	Fabio Baldato (ITA)	MG Maglificio–Technogym	+ 1' 27"
3	Andrei Tchmil (UKR)	Lotto–Isoglass	s.t.
4	Claudio Chiappucci (ITA)	Carrera Jeans–Tassoni	+ 2' 03"
5	Gianluca Bortolami (ITA)	Mapei–GB–Latexco	s.t.
6	Jesper Skibby (DEN)	TVM–Polis Direct	s.t.
7	Michele Bartoli (ITA)	Mercatone Uno–Saeco	+ 2' 05"
8	Viatcheslav Ekimov (RUS)	Novell–Decca–Colnago	+ 3' 25"
9	Max Sciandri (GBR)	MG Maglificio–Technogym	s.t.
10	Franco Ballerini (ITA)	Mapei–GB–Latexco	s.t.

General classification after Tour of Flanders

	Rider	Team	Points
1	Johan Museeuw (BEL)	Mapei–GB–Latexco	55
2	Laurent Jalabert (FRA)	ONCE	50
3	Fabio Baldato (ITA)	MG Maglificio–Technogym	43
4	Maurizio Fondriest (ITA)	Lampre–Panaria	40
5	Claudio Chiappucci (ITA)	Carrera Jeans–Tassoni	32
6	Michele Bartoli (ITA)	Mercatone Uno–Saeco	32
7	Stefano Zanini (ITA)	Gewiss–Ballan	31
8	Jesper Skibby (DEN)	TVM–Polis Direct	26
9	Andrei Tchmil (UKR)	Lotto–Isoglass	25
10	Davide Rebellin (ITA)	MG Maglificio–Technogym	20

9 April 1995 — Paris–Roubaix 266.5 km (165.6 mi)

	Rider	Team	Time
1	Franco Ballerini (ITA)	Mapei–GB–Latexco	6h 27' 08"
2	Andrei Tchmil (UKR)	Lotto–Isoglass	+ 1' 56"
3	Johan Museeuw (BEL)	Mapei–GB–Latexco	s.t.
4	Viatcheslav Ekimov (RUS)	Novell–Decca–Colnago	s.t.
5	Johan Capiot (BEL)	Refin	s.t.
6	Eric Vanderaerden (BEL)	Brescialat–Fago	+ 2' 00"
7	Fabio Baldato (ITA)	MG Maglificio–Technogym	s.t.
8	Frédéric Moncassin (FRA)	Novell–Decca–Colnago	s.t.
9	Rolf Aldag (GER)	Team Telekom	s.t.
10	Gianluca Bortolami (ITA)	Mapei–GB–Latexco	s.t.

General classification after Paris–Roubaix

	Rider	Team	Points
1	Johan Museeuw (BEL)	Mapei–GB–Latexco	80
2	Andrei Tchmil (UKR)	Lotto–Isoglass	60
3	Franco Ballerini (ITA)	Mapei–GB–Latexco	58
4	Fabio Baldato (ITA)	MG Maglificio–Technogym	57
5	Laurent Jalabert (FRA)	ONCE	50
6	Maurizio Fondriest (ITA)	Lampre–Panaria	40
7	Viatcheslav Ekimov (RUS)	Novell–Decca–Colnago	32
8	Claudio Chiappucci (ITA)	Carrera Jeans–Tassoni	32
9	Michele Bartoli (ITA)	Mercatone Uno–Saeco	32
10	Stefano Zanini (ITA)	Gewiss–Ballan	31

16 April 1995 — Liège–Bastogne–Liège 261.5 km (162.5 mi)

	Rider	Team	Time
1	Mauro Gianetti (SUI)	Polti–Granarolo–Santini	6h 38' 25"
2	Gianni Bugno (ITA)	MG Maglificio–Technogym	+ 15"
3	Michele Bartoli (ITA)	Mercatone Uno–Saeco	s.t.
4	Laurent Jalabert (FRA)	ONCE	s.t.
5	Francesco Casagrande (ITA)	Mercatone Uno–Saeco	+ 1' 24"
6	Lance Armstrong (USA)	Motorola	+ 3' 04"
7	Claudio Chiappucci (ITA)	Carrera Jeans–Tassoni	+ 4' 45"
8	Rolf Sørensen (DEN)	MG Maglificio–Technogym	s.t.
9	Heinz Imboden (SUI)	Refin	s.t.
10	Maarten den Bakker (NED)	TVM–Polis Direct	+ 10' 10"

General classification after Liège–Bastogne–Liège

	Rider	Team	Points
1	Johan Museeuw (BEL)	Mapei–GB–Latexco	80
2	Laurent Jalabert (FRA)	ONCE	70
3	Andrei Tchmil (UKR)	Lotto–Isoglass	65
4	Franco Ballerini (ITA)	Mapei–GB–Latexco	58
5	Fabio Baldato (ITA)	MG Maglificio–Technogym	57
6	Michele Bartoli (ITA)	Mercatone Uno–Saeco	57
7	Mauro Gianetti (SUI)	Polti–Granarolo–Santini	50
8	Maurizio Fondriest (ITA)	Lampre–Panaria	46
9	Claudio Chiappucci (ITA)	Carrera Jeans–Tassoni	46
10	Gianni Bugno (ITA)	MG Maglificio–Technogym	35

22 April 1995 — Amstel Gold Race 256 km (159.1 mi)

	Rider	Team	Time
1	Mauro Gianetti (SUI)	Polti–Granarolo–Santini	6h 38' 52"
2	Davide Cassani (ITA)	MG Maglificio–Technogym	s.t.
3	Beat Zberg (SUI)	Carrera Jeans–Tassoni	+ 27"
4	Olaf Ludwig (GER)	Team Telekom	s.t.
5	Jesper Skibby (DEN)	TVM–Polis Direct	s.t.
6	Alberto Elli (ITA)	MG Maglificio–Technogym	s.t.
7	Johan Museeuw (BEL)	Mapei–GB–Latexco	s.t.
8	Steven Rooks (NED)	TVM–Polis Direct	s.t.
9	Gianluca Bortolami (ITA)	Mapei–GB–Latexco	s.t.
10	Michele Bartoli (ITA)	Mercatone Uno–Saeco	s.t.

General classification after Amstel Gold Race

	Rider	Team	Points
1	Mauro Gianetti (SUI)	Polti–Granarolo–Santini	100
2	Johan Museeuw (BEL)	Mapei–GB–Latexco	94
3	Laurent Jalabert (FRA)	ONCE	70
4	Andrei Tchmil (UKR)	Lotto–Isoglass	65
5	Michele Bartoli (ITA)	Mercatone Uno–Saeco	65
6	Franco Ballerini (ITA)	Mapei–GB–Latexco	58
7	Fabio Baldato (ITA)	MG Maglificio–Technogym	57
8	Maurizio Fondriest (ITA)	Lampre–Panaria	46
9	Claudio Chiappucci (ITA)	Carrera Jeans–Tassoni	46
10	Jesper Skibby (DEN)	TVM–Polis Direct	44

1 May 1995 — Rund um den Henninger Turm 253 km (157.2 mi)

	Rider	Team	Time
1	Francesco Frattini (ITA)	Gewiss–Ballan	6h 25' 05"
2	Jens Heppner (GER)	Team Telekom	s.t.
3	Massimo Podenzana (ITA)	Brescialat–Fago	+ 3"
4	Andrea Tafi (ITA)	Mapei–GB–Latexco	+ 31"
5	Enrico Zaina (ITA)	Carrera Jeans–Tassoni	s.t.
6	Bruno Cenghialta (ITA)	Gewiss–Ballan	s.t.
7	Maurizio Fondriest (ITA)	Lampre–Panaria	+ 54"
8	Johan Museeuw (BEL)	Mapei–GB–Latexco	s.t.
9	Stefano Zanini (ITA)	Gewiss–Ballan	s.t.
10	Beat Zberg (SUI)	Carrera Jeans–Tassoni	s.t.

General classification after Rund um den Henninger Turm

	Rider	Team	Points
1	Johan Museeuw (BEL)	Mapei–GB–Latexco	106
2	Mauro Gianetti (SUI)	Polti–Granarolo–Santini	100
3	Laurent Jalabert (FRA)	ONCE	70
4	Andrei Tchmil (UKR)	Lotto–Isoglass	65
5	Michele Bartoli (ITA)	Mercatone Uno–Saeco	65
6	Maurizio Fondriest (ITA)	Lampre–Panaria	60
7	Franco Ballerini (ITA)	Mapei–GB–Latexco	58
8	Fabio Baldato (ITA)	MG Maglificio–Technogym	57
9	Francesco Frattini (ITA)	Gewiss–Ballan	50
10	Stefano Zanini (ITA)	Gewiss–Ballan	47

6 August 1995 — Leeds International Classic 231 km (143.5 mi)

	Rider	Team	Time
1	Max Sciandri (GBR)	MG Maglificio–Technogym	6h 00' 20"
2	Roberto Caruso (ITA)	ZG Mobili–Selle Italia	+ 44"
3	Alberto Elli (ITA)	MG Maglificio–Technogym	s.t.
4	Fabio Baldato (ITA)	MG Maglificio–Technogym	+ 53"
5	Johan Museeuw (BEL)	Mapei–GB–Latexco	s.t.
6	Laurent Jalabert (FRA)	ONCE	s.t.
7	Andrei Tchmil (UKR)	Lotto–Isoglass	s.t.
8	Maurizio Fondriest (ITA)	Lampre–Panaria	s.t.
9	Gian Matteo Fagnini (ITA)	Mercatone Uno–Saeco	s.t.
10	Mauro Bettin (ITA)	Aki–Gipiemme	s.t.

General classification after Leeds International Classic

	Rider	Team	Points
1	Johan Museeuw (BEL)	Mapei–GB–Latexco	124
2	Mauro Gianetti (SUI)	Polti–Granarolo–Santini	100
3	Laurent Jalabert (FRA)	ONCE	86
4	Andrei Tchmil (UKR)	Lotto–Isoglass	79
5	Fabio Baldato (ITA)	MG Maglificio–Technogym	77
6	Maurizio Fondriest (ITA)	Lampre–Panaria	72
7	Max Sciandri (GBR)	MG Maglificio–Technogym	65
8	Michele Bartoli (ITA)	Mercatone Uno–Saeco	65
9	Franco Ballerini (ITA)	Mapei–GB–Latexco	58
10	Francesco Frattini (ITA)	Gewiss–Ballan	50

12 August 1995 — Clásica de San Sebastián 230 km (142.9 mi)

	Rider	Team	Time
1	Lance Armstrong (USA)	Motorola	5h 31' 17"
2	Stefano Della Santa (ITA)	Mapei–GB–Latexco	+ 2"
3	Johan Museeuw (BEL)	Mapei–GB–Latexco	+ 27"
4	Laurent Jalabert (FRA)	ONCE	s.t.
5	Gianni Bugno (ITA)	MG Maglificio–Technogym	s.t.
6	Leonardo Piepoli (ITA)	Refin	+ 30"
7	Max Sciandri (GBR)	MG Maglificio–Technogym	+ 1' 50"
8	Frank Vandenbroucke (BEL)	Mapei–GB–Latexco	s.t.
9	Miguel Induráin (ESP)	Banesto	s.t.
10	Bruno Cenghialta (ITA)	Gewiss–Ballan	s.t.

General classification after Clásica de San Sebastián

	Rider	Team	Points
1	Johan Museeuw (BEL)	Mapei–GB–Latexco	149
2	Laurent Jalabert (FRA)	ONCE	106
3	Mauro Gianetti (SUI)	Polti–Granarolo–Santini	100
4	Max Sciandri (GBR)	MG Maglificio–Technogym	79
5	Andrei Tchmil (UKR)	Lotto–Isoglass	79
6	Fabio Baldato (ITA)	MG Maglificio–Technogym	77
7	Maurizio Fondriest (ITA)	Lampre–Panaria	72
8	Lance Armstrong (USA)	Motorola	66
9	Michele Bartoli (ITA)	Mercatone Uno–Saeco	65
10	Franco Ballerini (ITA)	Mapei–GB–Latexco	58

20 August 1995 — Züri-Metzgete 235 km (146.0 mi)

	Rider	Team	Time
1	Johan Museeuw (BEL)	Mapei–GB–Latexco	5h 34' 15"
2	Gianni Bugno (ITA)	MG Maglificio–Technogym	s.t.
3	Giorgio Furlan (ITA)	Gewiss–Ballan	s.t.
4	Michele Coppolillo (ITA)	Navigare–Blue Storm	s.t.
5	Maarten den Bakker (NED)	TVM–Polis Direct	s.t.
6	Massimo Donati (ITA)	Mercatone Uno–Saeco	s.t.
7	Fabio Baldato (ITA)	MG Maglificio–Technogym	s.t.
8	Andrea Ferrigato (ITA)	ZG Mobili–Selle Italia	s.t.
9	Maurizio Fondriest (ITA)	Lampre–Panaria	+ 7"
10	Lance Armstrong (USA)	Motorola	s.t.

General classification after Züri-Metzgete

	Rider	Team	Points
1	Johan Museeuw (BEL)	Mapei–GB–Latexco	199
2	Laurent Jalabert (FRA)	ONCE	111
3	Mauro Gianetti (SUI)	Polti–Granarolo–Santini	100
4	Fabio Baldato (ITA)	MG Maglificio–Technogym	91
5	Gianni Bugno (ITA)	MG Maglificio–Technogym	88
6	Maurizio Fondriest (ITA)	Lampre–Panaria	82
7	Max Sciandri (GBR)	MG Maglificio–Technogym	79
8	Andrei Tchmil (UKR)	Lotto–Isoglass	79
9	Lance Armstrong (USA)	Motorola	74
10	Michele Bartoli (ITA)	Mercatone Uno–Saeco	65

15 October 1995 — Paris–Tours 250 km (155.3 mi)

	Rider	Team	Time
1	Nicola Minali (ITA)	Gewiss–Ballan	5h 45' 55"
2	Andrei Tchmil (UKR)	Lotto–Isoglass	s.t.
3	Sven Teutenberg (GER)	Novell–Decca–Colnago	s.t.
4	Jürgen Werner (GER)	Team Telekom	s.t.
5	Johan Capiot (BEL)	Refin	s.t.
6	Hendrik Redant (BEL)	TVM–Polis Direct	s.t.
7	Adriano Baffi (ITA)	Mapei–GB–Latexco	s.t.
8	Lars Michaelsen (DEN)	Festina–Lotus	s.t.
9	Michele Bartoli (ITA)	Mercatone Uno–Saeco	s.t.
10	Gabriele Missaglia (ITA)	Brescialat–Fago	s.t.

General classification after Paris–Tours

	Rider	Team	Points
1	Johan Museeuw (BEL)	Mapei–GB–Latexco	199
2	Andrei Tchmil (UKR)	Lotto–Isoglass	114
3	Laurent Jalabert (FRA)	ONCE	111
4	Mauro Gianetti (SUI)	Polti–Granarolo–Santini	100
5	Fabio Baldato (ITA)	MG Maglificio–Technogym	91
6	Gianni Bugno (ITA)	MG Maglificio–Technogym	88
7	Maurizio Fondriest (ITA)	Lampre–Panaria	87
8	Max Sciandri (GBR)	MG Maglificio–Technogym	79
9	Michele Bartoli (ITA)	Mercatone Uno–Saeco	75
10	Lance Armstrong (USA)	Motorola	74

21 October 1995 — Giro di Lombardia 252 km (156.6 mi)

	Rider	Team	Time
1	Gianni Faresin (ITA)	Lampre–Panaria	5h 49' 02"
2	Daniele Nardello (ITA)	Mapei–GB–Latexco	+ 19"
3	Michele Bartoli (ITA)	Mercatone Uno–Saeco	s.t.
4	Rolf Sørensen (DEN)	MG Maglificio–Technogym	+ 56"
5	Stefano Zanini (ITA)	Gewiss–Ballan	+ 1' 02"
6	Claudio Chiappucci (ITA)	Carrera Jeans–Tassoni	s.t.
7	Francesco Casagrande (ITA)	Mercatone Uno–Saeco	s.t.
8	Pascal Richard (SUI)	MG Maglificio–Technogym	s.t.
9	Roberto Pistore (ITA)	Polti–Granarolo–Santini	s.t.
10	Felice Puttini (SUI)	Refin	s.t.

General classification after Giro di Lombardia

	Rider	Team	Points
1	Johan Museeuw (BEL)	Mapei–GB–Latexco	199
2	Andrei Tchmil (UKR)	Lotto–Isoglass	114
3	Mauro Gianetti (SUI)	Polti–Granarolo–Santini	106
4	Michele Bartoli (ITA)	Mercatone Uno–Saeco	100
5	Fabio Baldato (ITA)	MG Maglificio–Technogym	91
6	Gianni Bugno (ITA)	MG Maglificio–Technogym	88
7	Maurizio Fondriest (ITA)	Lampre–Panaria	87
8	Max Sciandri (GBR)	MG Maglificio–Technogym	79
9	Lance Armstrong (USA)	Motorola	74
10	Stefano Zanini (ITA)	Gewiss–Ballan	65

== Final standings ==
=== Individual ===
Points are awarded to the top 12 classified riders. Riders must start at least 6 races to be classified.

The points are awarded for every race using the following system:

Position	1st	2nd	3rd	4th	5th	6th	7th	8th	9th	10th	11th	12th
Points	50	35	25	20	18	16	14	12	10	8	6	5

Pos.	Rider	Team	MSR	ToF	ROU	LBL	AGR	FRA	LEE	CSS	SUI	TOU	LOM	Pts.
1	Johan Museeuw (BEL)	Mapei–GB–Latexco	5	50	25	0	14	12	18	25	50	0	0	199
2	Andrei Tchmil (UKR)	Lotto–Isoglass	0	25	35	5	0	0	14	0	0	35	?	114
3	Mauro Gianetti (SUI)	Polti–Granarolo–Santini	0	?	?	50	50	0	?	0	0	0	6	106
4	Michele Bartoli (ITA)	Mercatone Uno–Saeco	18	14	?	25	8	0	0	0	?	10	25	100
5	Fabio Baldato (ITA)	MG Maglificio–Technogym	8	35	14	?	0	0	20	?	14	?	?	91
6	Gianni Bugno (ITA)	MG Maglificio–Technogym	0	0	DNS	35	0	0	0	18	35	?	0	88
7	Maurizio Fondriest (ITA)	Lampre–Panaria	35	5	DNS	6	0	14	12	0	10	5	0	87
8	Max Sciandri (GBR)	MG Maglificio–Technogym	0	10	5	0	?	0	50	14	0	?	0	79
9	Lance Armstrong (USA)	Motorola	0	0	?	16	?	DNS	0	50	8	?	?	74
10	Stefano Zanini (ITA)	Gewiss–Ballan	25	6	0	0	6	10	?	0	?	0	18	65
11	Claudio Chiappucci (ITA)	Carrera Jeans–Tassoni	12	20	DNS	14	0	0	?	0	0	?	16	62
12	Franco Ballerini (ITA)	Mapei–GB–Latexco	0	8	50	0	0	DNS	0	0	0	?	?	58
Race winners not eligible for general classification or out of top 12
Pos.	Rider	Team	MSR	ToF	ROU	LBL	AGR	FRA	LEE	CSS	SUI	TOU	LOM	Pts.
-	Laurent Jalabert (FRA)	ONCE	50	DNS	DNS	20	DNS	DNS	16	20	6	DNS	DNS	111
?	Gianni Faresin (ITA)	Lampre–Panaria	?	?	?	0	?	?	0	0	?	?	50	50
?	Nicola Minali (ITA)	Gewiss–Ballan	0	?	?	?	0	0	?	?	?	50	?	50
?	Francesco Frattini (ITA)	Gewiss–Ballan	?	?	?	0	?	50	?	?	?	?	0	50

Key
Colour	Result
Gold	Winner
Silver	2nd place
Bronze	3rd place
Green	Top ten position
Blue	Other points position
Purple	Out of points, retired
Red	Did not start (DNS)
White	unclear if retired or DNS

=== Team classification ===
Rank	Team	Points
1	Mapei–GB–Latexco	98
2	MG Maglificio–Technogym	97
3	Gewiss–Ballan	50
4	TVM–Polis Direct	46
5	Carrera Jeans–Tassoni	41
