= 1995 Giro d'Italia, Stage 1 to Stage 11 =

Cycling race stages

The 1995 Giro d'Italia was the 78th edition of the Giro d'Italia, one of cycling's Grand Tours. The Giro began in Perugia, with a mountainous stage on 13 May, and Stage 11 occurred on 24 May with a stage to Il Ciocco. The race finished in Milan on 4 June.

== Stage 1 ==
13 May 1995 — Perugia to Terni, 205 km (127 mi)

Stage 1 result

Rank	Rider	Team	Time
1	Mario Cipollini (ITA)	Mercatone Uno–Saeco	5h 15' 53"
2	Mario Manzoni (ITA)	Brescialat–Fago	s.t.
3	Johan Capiot (BEL)	Refin	s.t.
4	Giovanni Fidanza (ITA)	Polti–Granarolo–Santini	s.t.
5	François Simon (FRA)	Castorama	s.t.
6	Nicola Minali (ITA)	Gewiss–Ballan	s.t.
7	Rolf Sørensen (DEN)	MG Maglificio–Technogym	s.t.
8	Michel Lafis (SWE)	Amore & Vita–Galatron	s.t.
9	Gilles Talmant (FRA)	Castorama	s.t.
10	Alessandro Bertolini (ITA)	Carrera Jeans–Tassoni	s.t.

General classification after Stage 1

Rank	Rider	Team	Time
1	Mario Cipollini (ITA)	Mercatone Uno–Saeco	5h 15' 41"
2	Mario Manzoni (ITA)	Brescialat–Fago	+ 4"
3	Maurizio Fondriest (ITA)	Lampre–Panaria	+ 6"
4	Johan Capiot (BEL)	Refin	+ 8"
5	Giovanni Fidanza (ITA)	Polti–Granarolo–Santini	s.t.
6	Tony Rominger (SUI)	Mapei–GB–Latexco	+ 10"
7	François Simon (FRA)	Castorama	+ 12"
8	Nicola Minali (ITA)	Gewiss–Ballan	s.t.
9	Rolf Sørensen (DEN)	MG Maglificio–Technogym	s.t.
10	Michel Lafis (SWE)	Amore & Vita–Galatron	s.t.

== Stage 2 ==
14 May 1995 — Foligno to Assisi, 19 km (12 mi) (ITT)

Stage 2 result

Rank	Rider	Team	Time
1	Tony Rominger (SUI)	Mapei–GB–Latexco	25' 05"
2	Rolf Sørensen (DEN)	MG Maglificio–Technogym	+ 47"
3	Maurizio Fondriest (ITA)	Lampre–Panaria	s.t.
4	Francesco Casagrande (ITA)	Mercatone Uno–Saeco	+ 51"
5	Evgeni Berzin (RUS)	Gewiss–Ballan	+ 55"
6	Piotr Ugrumov (RUS)	Gewiss–Ballan	+ 1' 08"
7	Massimiliano Lelli (ITA)	Mercatone Uno–Saeco	+ 1' 10"
8	Wladimir Belli (ITA)	Lampre–Panaria	s.t.
9	Pavel Tonkov (RUS)	Lampre–Panaria	+ 1' 12"
10	Mario Cipollini (ITA)	Mercatone Uno–Saeco	+ 1' 20"

General classification after Stage 2

Rank	Rider	Team	Time
1	Tony Rominger (SUI)	Mapei–GB–Latexco	5h 40' 56"
2	Maurizio Fondriest (ITA)	Lampre–Panaria	+ 43"
3	Rolf Sørensen (DEN)	MG Maglificio–Technogym	+ 49"
4	Francesco Casagrande (ITA)	Mercatone Uno–Saeco	+ 53"
5	Evgeni Berzin (RUS)	Gewiss–Ballan	+ 57"
6	Mario Cipollini (ITA)	Mercatone Uno–Saeco	+ 1' 10"
7	Piotr Ugrumov (RUS)	Gewiss–Ballan	s.t.
8	Massimiliano Lelli (ITA)	Mercatone Uno–Saeco	+ 1' 12"
9	Wladimir Belli (ITA)	Lampre–Panaria	s.t.
10	Pavel Tonkov (RUS)	Lampre–Panaria	+ 1' 14"

== Stage 3 ==
15 May 1995 — Spoleto to Marotta, 161 km (100 mi)

Stage 3 result

Rank	Rider	Team	Time
1	Mario Cipollini (ITA)	Mercatone Uno–Saeco	3h 56' 11"
2	Johan Capiot (BEL)	Refin	s.t.
3	Giuseppe Citterio (ITA)	Aki–Gipiemme	s.t.
4	Ján Svorada (SVK)	Lampre–Panaria	s.t.
5	Nicola Minali (ITA)	Gewiss–Ballan	s.t.
6	Giovanni Fidanza (ITA)	Polti–Granarolo–Santini	s.t.
7	Silvio Martinello (ITA)	Mercatone Uno–Saeco	s.t.
8	Massimo Strazzer (ITA)	Navigare–Blue Storm	s.t.
9	Marco Villa (ITA)	Amore & Vita–Galatron	s.t.
10	Mario Manzoni (ITA)	Brescialat–Fago	s.t.

General classification after Stage 3

Rank	Rider	Team	Time
1	Tony Rominger (SUI)	Mapei–GB–Latexco	9h 37' 07"
2	Maurizio Fondriest (ITA)	Lampre–Panaria	+ 43"
3	Rolf Sørensen (DEN)	MG Maglificio–Technogym	+ 49"
4	Mario Cipollini (ITA)	Mercatone Uno–Saeco	+ 52"
5	Francesco Casagrande (ITA)	Mercatone Uno–Saeco	+ 53"
6	Evgeni Berzin (RUS)	Gewiss–Ballan	+ 57"
7	Piotr Ugrumov (RUS)	Gewiss–Ballan	+ 1' 10"
8	Massimiliano Lelli (ITA)	Mercatone Uno–Saeco	+ 1' 12"
9	Wladimir Belli (ITA)	Lampre–Panaria	s.t.
10	Pavel Tonkov (RUS)	Lampre–Panaria	+ 1' 14"

== Stage 4 ==
16 May 1995 — Mondolfo to Loreto, 192 km (119 mi)

Stage 4 result

Rank	Rider	Team	Time
1	Tony Rominger (SUI)	Mapei–GB–Latexco	3h 56' 11"
2	Maurizio Fondriest (ITA)	Lampre–Panaria	+ 4"
3	Francesco Casagrande (ITA)	Mercatone Uno–Saeco	+ 6"
4	Claudio Chiappucci (ITA)	Carrera Jeans–Tassoni	s.t.
5	Enrico Zaina (ITA)	Carrera Jeans–Tassoni	s.t.
6	Evgeni Berzin (RUS)	Gewiss–Ballan	s.t.
7	Heinz Imboden (SUI)	Refin	s.t.
8	Paolo Lanfranchi (ITA)	Brescialat–Fago	s.t.
9	Davide Rebellin (ITA)	MG Maglificio–Technogym	s.t.
10	Piotr Ugrumov (RUS)	Gewiss–Ballan	s.t.

General classification after Stage 4

Rank	Rider	Team	Time
1	Tony Rominger (SUI)	Mapei–GB–Latexco	15h 07' 48"
2	Maurizio Fondriest (ITA)	Lampre–Panaria	+ 51"
3	Francesco Casagrande (ITA)	Mercatone Uno–Saeco	+ 1' 07"
4	Evgeni Berzin (RUS)	Gewiss–Ballan	+ 1' 15"
5	Piotr Ugrumov (RUS)	Gewiss–Ballan	+ 1' 28"
6	Davide Rebellin (ITA)	MG Maglificio–Technogym	+ 1' 45"
7	Pavel Tonkov (RUS)	Lampre–Panaria	s.t.
8	Massimiliano Lelli (ITA)	Mercatone Uno–Saeco	+ 1' 49"
9	Wladimir Belli (ITA)	Lampre–Panaria	+ 2' 07"
10	Enrico Zaina (ITA)	Carrera Jeans–Tassoni	+ 2' 10"

== Stage 5 ==
17 May 1995 — Porto Recanati to Tortoreto, 182 km (113 mi)

Stage 5 result

Rank	Rider	Team	Time
1	Filippo Casagrande (ITA)	Brescialat–Fago	4h 39' 02"
2	Rolf Sørensen (DEN)	MG Maglificio–Technogym	s.t.
3	Erik Breukink (NED)	ONCE	s.t.
4	Mario Chiesa (ITA)	Carrera Jeans–Tassoni	+ 4"
5	Luca Gelfi (ITA)	Brescialat–Fago	+ 31"
6	Ján Svorada (SVK)	Lampre–Panaria	+ 1' 06"
7	Stefano Zanatta (ITA)	Aki–Gipiemme	s.t.
8	Stefano Giraldi (ITA)	Refin	s.t.
9	José Luis Arrieta (ESP)	Banesto	s.t.
10	Mario Mantovan (ITA)	Carrera Jeans–Tassoni	s.t.

General classification after Stage 5

Rank	Rider	Team	Time
1	Tony Rominger (SUI)	Mapei–GB–Latexco	19h 50' 39"
2	Maurizio Fondriest (ITA)	Lampre–Panaria	+ 51"
3	Francesco Casagrande (ITA)	Mercatone Uno–Saeco	+ 1' 07"
4	Evgeni Berzin (RUS)	Gewiss–Ballan	+ 1' 15"
5	Piotr Ugrumov (RUS)	Gewiss–Ballan	+ 1' 28"
6	Davide Rebellin (ITA)	MG Maglificio–Technogym	+ 1' 45"
7	Pavel Tonkov (RUS)	Lampre–Panaria	s.t.
8	Massimiliano Lelli (ITA)	Mercatone Uno–Saeco	+ 1' 49"
9	Wladimir Belli (ITA)	Lampre–Panaria	+ 2' 07"
10	Enrico Zaina (ITA)	Carrera Jeans–Tassoni	+ 2' 10"

== Stage 6 ==
18 May 1995 — Trani to Taranto, 165 km (103 mi)

Stage 6 result

Rank	Rider	Team	Time
1	Nicola Minali (ITA)	Gewiss–Ballan	4h 11' 15"
2	Mario Cipollini (ITA)	Mercatone Uno–Saeco	s.t.
3	Ján Svorada (SVK)	Lampre–Panaria	s.t.
4	Giovanni Lombardi (ITA)	Polti–Granarolo–Santini	s.t.
5	Giuseppe Citterio (ITA)	Aki–Gipiemme	s.t.
6	Massimo Strazzer (ITA)	Navigare–Blue Storm	s.t.
7	Giovanni Fidanza (ITA)	Polti–Granarolo–Santini	s.t.
8	François Simon (FRA)	Castorama	s.t.
9	Peter Van Petegem (BEL)	TVM–Polis Direct	s.t.
10	Mario Manzoni (ITA)	Brescialat–Fago	s.t.

General classification after Stage 6

Rank	Rider	Team	Time
1	Tony Rominger (SUI)	Mapei–GB–Latexco	24h 01' 54"
2	Maurizio Fondriest (ITA)	Lampre–Panaria	+ 51"
3	Francesco Casagrande (ITA)	Mercatone Uno–Saeco	+ 1' 07"
4	Evgeni Berzin (RUS)	Gewiss–Ballan	+ 1' 15"
5	Piotr Ugrumov (RUS)	Gewiss–Ballan	+ 1' 28"
6	Davide Rebellin (ITA)	MG Maglificio–Technogym	+ 1' 45"
7	Pavel Tonkov (RUS)	Lampre–Panaria	s.t.
8	Massimiliano Lelli (ITA)	Mercatone Uno–Saeco	+ 1' 49"
9	Wladimir Belli (ITA)	Lampre–Panaria	+ 2' 07"
10	Enrico Zaina (ITA)	Carrera Jeans–Tassoni	+ 2' 10"

== Stage 7 ==
19 May 1995 — Taranto to Terme Luigiane, 216 km (134 mi)

Stage 7 result

Rank	Rider	Team	Time
1	Maurizio Fondriest (ITA)	Lampre–Panaria	5h 11' 50"
2	Tony Rominger (SUI)	Mapei–GB–Latexco	s.t.
3	Francesco Casagrande (ITA)	Mercatone Uno–Saeco	s.t.
4	Piotr Ugrumov (RUS)	Gewiss–Ballan	+ 2"
5	François Simon (FRA)	Castorama	+ 5"
6	Claudio Chiappucci (ITA)	Carrera Jeans–Tassoni	s.t.
7	Massimiliano Lelli (ITA)	Mercatone Uno–Saeco	s.t.
8	Davide Rebellin (ITA)	MG Maglificio–Technogym	s.t.
9	Evgeni Berzin (RUS)	Gewiss–Ballan	s.t.
10	Jens Heppner (GER)	Team Telekom	s.t.

General classification after Stage 7

Rank	Rider	Team	Time
1	Tony Rominger (SUI)	Mapei–GB–Latexco	29h 13' 36"
2	Maurizio Fondriest (ITA)	Lampre–Panaria	+ 47"
3	Francesco Casagrande (ITA)	Mercatone Uno–Saeco	+ 1' 11"
4	Evgeni Berzin (RUS)	Gewiss–Ballan	+ 1' 28"
5	Piotr Ugrumov (RUS)	Gewiss–Ballan	+ 1' 38"
6	Davide Rebellin (ITA)	MG Maglificio–Technogym	+ 1' 58"
7	Pavel Tonkov (RUS)	Lampre–Panaria	s.t.
8	Massimiliano Lelli (ITA)	Mercatone Uno–Saeco	+ 2' 02"
9	Wladimir Belli (ITA)	Lampre–Panaria	+ 2' 20"
10	Enrico Zaina (ITA)	Carrera Jeans–Tassoni	+ 2' 23"

== Stage 8 ==
20 May 1995 — Acquappesa to Massiccio del Sirino, 209 km (130 mi)

Stage 8 result

Rank	Rider	Team	Time
1	Laudelino Cubino (ESP)	Kelme–Sureña	5h 53' 03"
2	Bruno Cenghialta (ITA)	Gewiss–Ballan	+ 1' 19"
3	Francesco Frattini (ITA)	Gewiss–Ballan	+ 1' 24"
4	Stefano Cattai (ITA)	ZG Mobili–Selle Italia	s.t.
5	Hernán Buenahora (COL)	Kelme–Sureña	s.t.
6	Georg Totschnig (AUT)	Polti–Granarolo–Santini	+ 1' 38"
7	Tony Rominger (SUI)	Mapei–GB–Latexco	+ 1' 42"
8	Oliverio Rincón (COL)	ONCE	+ 1' 43"
9	Piotr Ugrumov (RUS)	Gewiss–Ballan	+ 1' 48"
10	Francesco Casagrande (ITA)	Mercatone Uno–Saeco	s.t.

General classification after Stage 8

Rank	Rider	Team	Time
1	Tony Rominger (SUI)	Mapei–GB–Latexco	35h 07' 21"
2	Francesco Casagrande (ITA)	Mercatone Uno–Saeco	+ 1' 17"
3	Laudelino Cubino (ESP)	Kelme–Sureña	+ 1' 26"
4	Piotr Ugrumov (RUS)	Gewiss–Ballan	+ 1' 44"
5	Evgeni Berzin (RUS)	Gewiss–Ballan	+ 1' 52"
6	Davide Rebellin (ITA)	MG Maglificio–Technogym	+ 2' 04"
7	Bruno Cenghialta (ITA)	Gewiss–Ballan	+ 2' 21"
8	Pavel Tonkov (RUS)	Lampre–Panaria	+ 2' 26"
9	Claudio Chiappucci (ITA)	Carrera Jeans–Tassoni	+ 2' 30"
10	Francesco Frattini (ITA)	Gewiss–Ballan	+ 2' 35"

== Stage 9 ==
21 May 1995 — Terme La Calda to Salerno, 165 km (103 mi)

Stage 9 result

Rank	Rider	Team	Time
1	Rolf Sørensen (DEN)	MG Maglificio–Technogym	3h 32' 12"
2	Francesco Frattini (ITA)	Gewiss–Ballan	s.t.
3	François Simon (FRA)	Castorama	s.t.
4	Marco Saligari (ITA)	MG Maglificio–Technogym	s.t.
5	Massimo Ghirotto (ITA)	ZG Mobili–Selle Italia	s.t.
6	Mario Chiesa (ITA)	Carrera Jeans–Tassoni	s.t.
7	Michel Lafis (SWE)	Amore & Vita–Galatron	s.t.
8	Udo Bölts (GER)	Team Telekom	s.t.
9	Rodolfo Massi (ITA)	Refin	s.t.
10	Gianni Faresin (ITA)	Lampre–Panaria	s.t.

General classification after Stage 9

Rank	Rider	Team	Time
1	Tony Rominger (SUI)	Mapei–GB–Latexco	38h 39' 46"
2	Francesco Casagrande (ITA)	Mercatone Uno–Saeco	+ 1' 17"
3	Laudelino Cubino (ESP)	Kelme–Sureña	+ 1' 26"
4	Piotr Ugrumov (RUS)	Gewiss–Ballan	+ 1' 44"
5	Evgeni Berzin (RUS)	Gewiss–Ballan	+ 1' 52"
6	Davide Rebellin (ITA)	MG Maglificio–Technogym	+ 2' 04"
7	Francesco Frattini (ITA)	Gewiss–Ballan	+ 2' 14"
8	Bruno Cenghialta (ITA)	Gewiss–Ballan	+ 2' 21"
9	Pavel Tonkov (RUS)	Lampre–Panaria	+ 2' 26"
10	Claudio Chiappucci (ITA)	Carrera Jeans–Tassoni	+ 2' 30"

== Stage 10 ==
22 May 1995 — Telese Terme to Maddaloni, 42 km (26 mi) (ITT)

Stage 10 result

Rank	Rider	Team	Time
1	Tony Rominger (SUI)	Mapei–GB–Latexco	51' 54"
2	Evgeni Berzin (RUS)	Gewiss–Ballan	+ 1' 24"
3	Piotr Ugrumov (RUS)	Gewiss–Ballan	s.t.
4	Francesco Casagrande (ITA)	Mercatone Uno–Saeco	+ 1' 43"
5	Maurizio Fondriest (ITA)	Lampre–Panaria	+ 1' 44"
6	Patrick Jonker (AUS)	ONCE	+ 2' 11"
7	Rolf Sørensen (DEN)	MG Maglificio–Technogym	+ 2' 19"
8	Claudio Chiappucci (ITA)	Carrera Jeans–Tassoni	+ 2' 29"
9	Vladislav Bobrik (RUS)	Gewiss–Ballan	+ 2' 42"
10	Massimiliano Lelli (ITA)	Mercatone Uno–Saeco	+ 2' 58"

General classification after Stage 10

Rank	Rider	Team	Time
1	Tony Rominger (SUI)	Mapei–GB–Latexco	39h 31' 40"
2	Francesco Casagrande (ITA)	Mercatone Uno–Saeco	+ 3' 00"
3	Piotr Ugrumov (RUS)	Gewiss–Ballan	+ 3' 08"
4	Evgeni Berzin (RUS)	Gewiss–Ballan	+ 3' 16"
5	Claudio Chiappucci (ITA)	Carrera Jeans–Tassoni	+ 4' 59"
6	Davide Rebellin (ITA)	MG Maglificio–Technogym	+ 5' 42"
7	Pavel Tonkov (RUS)	Lampre–Panaria	+ 5' 57"
8	Laudelino Cubino (ESP)	Kelme–Sureña	+ 6' 08"
9	Francesco Frattini (ITA)	Gewiss–Ballan	+ 6' 11"
10	Massimiliano Lelli (ITA)	Mercatone Uno–Saeco	+ 6' 24"

== Rest day ==
23 May 1995

== Stage 11 ==
24 May 1995 — Pietrasanta to Il Ciocco, 175 km (109 mi)

Stage 11 result

Rank	Rider	Team	Time
1	Enrico Zaina (ITA)	Carrera Jeans–Tassoni	4h 37' 36"
2	Nelson Rodríguez Serna (COL)	ZG Mobili–Selle Italia	s.t.
3	Gilberto Simoni (ITA)	Aki–Gipiemme	+ 22"
4	Giorgio Furlan (ITA)	Gewiss–Ballan	+ 35"
5	Piotr Ugrumov (RUS)	Gewiss–Ballan	+ 43"
6	Tony Rominger (SUI)	Mapei–GB–Latexco	s.t.
7	Evgeni Berzin (RUS)	Gewiss–Ballan	s.t.
8	Oliverio Rincón (COL)	ONCE	s.t.
9	Laurent Madouas (FRA)	Castorama	s.t.
10	Claudio Chiappucci (ITA)	Carrera Jeans–Tassoni	+ 56"

General classification after Stage 11

Rank	Rider	Team	Time
1	Tony Rominger (SUI)	Mapei–GB–Latexco	44h 09' 59"
2	Piotr Ugrumov (RUS)	Gewiss–Ballan	+ 3' 08"
3	Evgeni Berzin (RUS)	Gewiss–Ballan	+ 3' 16"
4	Francesco Casagrande (ITA)	Mercatone Uno–Saeco	+ 3' 20"
5	Claudio Chiappucci (ITA)	Carrera Jeans–Tassoni	+ 5' 12"
6	Enrico Zaina (ITA)	Carrera Jeans–Tassoni	+ 6' 24"
7	Bruno Cenghialta (ITA)	Gewiss–Ballan	+ 6' 48"
8	Pavel Tonkov (RUS)	Lampre–Panaria	+ 6' 52"
9	Alberto Elli (ITA)	MG Maglificio–Technogym	+ 7' 02"
10	Davide Rebellin (ITA)	MG Maglificio–Technogym	+ 7' 12"
