= 1995 Züri-Metzgete =

1995 UCI Road World Cup

Race details
- Dates: 20 August 1995
- Stages: 1
- Distance: 235 km (146.0 mi)
- Winning time: 5h 34' 15"

Results
	Winner	Johan Museeuw (BEL)	(Mapei–GB–Latexco)
	Second	Gianni Bugno (ITA)	(MG Maglificio–Technogym)
	Third	Giorgio Furlan (ITA)	(Gewiss–Ballan)

The 1995 Züri-Metzgete was the 80th edition of the Züri-Metzgete road cycling one day race. It was held on 20 August 1995 as part of the 1995 UCI Road World Cup. The race took place between the cities of Basel and Zürich was won by Johan Museeuw of Belgium.

== Result ==
Rank	Rider	Team	Time
1	Johan Museeuw (BEL)	Mapei–GB–Latexco	5h 34' 15"
2	Gianni Bugno (ITA)	MG Maglificio–Technogym	s.t.
3	Giorgio Furlan (ITA)	Gewiss–Ballan	s.t.
4	Michele Coppolillo (ITA)	Navigare–Blue Storm	s.t.
5	Maarten den Bakker (NED)	TVM–Polis Direct	s.t.
6	Massimo Donati (ITA)	Mercatone Uno–Saeco	s.t.
7	Fabio Baldato (ITA)	MG Maglificio–Technogym	s.t.
8	Andrea Ferrigato (ITA)	ZG Mobili–Selle Italia	s.t.
9	Maurizio Fondriest (ITA)	Lampre–Panaria	+ 7"
10	Lance Armstrong (USA)	Motorola	s.t.
