= 1995 Rund um den Henninger Turm =

1995 UCI Road World Cup

Race details
- Dates: 1 May 1995
- Stages: 1
- Distance: 253 km (157 mi)
- Winning time: 6h 25' 05"

Results
	Winner	Francesco Frattini (ITA)	(Gewiss–Ballan)
	Second	Jens Heppner (GER)	(Team Telekom)
	Third	Massimo Podenzana (ITA)	(Brescialat–Fago)

The 1995 Rund um den Henninger Turm was the 34th edition of the Rund um den Henninger Turm cycle race and was held on 1 May 1995. The race started and finished in Frankfurt. The race was won by Francesco Frattini of the Gewiss–Ballan team.

== General classification ==
Final general classification

Rank	Rider	Team	Time
1	Francesco Frattini (ITA)	Gewiss–Ballan	6h 25' 05"
2	Jens Heppner (GER)	Team Telekom	s.t.
3	Massimo Podenzana (ITA)	Brescialat–Fago	+ 3"
4	Andrea Tafi (ITA)	Mapei–GB–Latexco	+ 31"
5	Enrico Zaina (ITA)	Carrera Jeans–Tassoni	s.t.
6	Bruno Cenghialta (ITA)	Gewiss–Ballan	s.t.
7	Maurizio Fondriest (ITA)	Lampre–Panaria	+ 54"
8	Johan Museeuw (BEL)	Mapei–GB–Latexco	s.t.
9	Stefano Zanini (ITA)	Gewiss–Ballan	s.t.
10	Beat Zberg (SUI)	Carrera Jeans–Tassoni	s.t.
