= 1995 Leeds International Classic =

Road cycling race

1995 UCI Road World Cup

Race details
- Dates: 6 August 1995
- Stages: 1
- Distance: 231 km (143.5 mi)
- Winning time: 6h 00' 20"

Results
	Winner	Max Sciandri (GBR)	(MG Maglificio–Technogym)
	Second	Roberto Caruso (ITA)	(ZG Mobili–Selle Italia)
	Third	Alberto Elli (ITA)	(MG Maglificio–Technogym)

The 1995 Leeds International Classic was the 7th edition of the Leeds International Classic cycle race (also known as Wincanton Classic and Rochester International Classic) and was held on 6 August. The race took place in and around Leeds. The race was won by Max Sciandri of the MG Maglificio–Technogym team.

== Results ==
	Rider	Team	Time
1	Max Sciandri (GBR)	MG Maglificio–Technogym	6h 00' 20"
2	Roberto Caruso (ITA)	ZG Mobili–Selle Italia	+ 44"
3	Alberto Elli (ITA)	MG Maglificio–Technogym	s.t.
4	Fabio Baldato (ITA)	MG Maglificio–Technogym	+ 53"
5	Johan Museeuw (BEL)	Mapei–GB–Latexco	s.t.
6	Laurent Jalabert (FRA)	ONCE	s.t.
7	Andrei Tchmil (UKR)	Lotto–Isoglass	s.t.
8	Maurizio Fondriest (ITA)	Lampre–Panaria	s.t.
9	Gian Matteo Fagnini (ITA)	Mercatone Uno–Saeco	s.t.
10	Mauro Bettin (ITA)	Aki–Gipiemme	s.t.
