= Massimo Donati (cyclist) =

Italian cyclist

Personal information
- Born: 18 January 1967 (age 59) Santa Maria a Monte, Italy
- Height: 1.86 m (6 ft 1 in)
- Weight: 75 kg (165 lb)

Cycling career
- Sport: Cycling
- Current team: Retired
- Discipline: Road
- Role: Rider

Professional teams
- 1992: Mercatone Uno–Medeghini–Zucchini (stagiaire)
- 1993–1995: Mercatone Uno–Zucchini–Medeghini
- 1996–1998: Saeco–AS Juvenes San Marino
- 1999–2002: Vini Caldirola

Major wins
- One-day races and Classics Giro del Lazio (2001) Tre Valli Varesine (2000)

Massimo Donati (born 18 January 1967) is an Italian former professional racing cyclist. He rode in four editions of the Tour de France and five editions of the Giro d'Italia.

== Major results ==
1990
1st Gran Premio Industrie del Marmo
7th Gran Premio della Liberazione
1992
2nd Giro d'Oro
1993
10th Coppa Bernocchi
1994
5th Giro del Veneto
7th Coppa Placci
9th Overall Volta a Catalunya

1st Stage 6

1995
1st GP Sanson
2nd Giro dell'Emilia
3rd Coppa Placci
3rd Giro del Veneto
6th Züri-Metzgete
7th Giro di Romagna
10th Coppa Bernocchi
1996
3rd Trofeo dello Scalatore
3rd Tre Valli Varesine
8th Coppa Placci
8th Giro dell'Emilia
8th Coppa Agostoni
8th GP Industria & Artigianato di Larciano
10th Coppa Sabatini
10th GP Industria & Commercio di Prato
1997
2nd Overall Route du Sud
4th Giro dell'Emilia
7th Overall Tirreno–Adriatico
9th GP de Fourmies
10th Overall Vuelta a Aragon
10th Coppa Placci
1998
1st Trofeo dello Scalatore
2nd Overall Giro di Puglia

1st Stage 2

2nd Giro dell'Emilia
2nd GP Industria & Commercio di Prato
2nd Trofeo Pantalica
3rd Coppa Placci
3rd Giro di Toscana
4th Coppa Sabatini
5th Giro del Lazio
6th Overall Vuelta a Aragon
8th Overall Tour of Austria

1st Stage 4

10th Trofeo Comunidad Foral de Navarra
1999
1st Gran Premio Città di Camaiore
1st Coppa Ugo Agostoni
2nd Giro dell'Emilia
2nd Trofeo dello Scalatore
4th Giro di Toscana
4th Coppa Placci
5th Subida a Urkiola
6th Trofeo Matteotti
8th Giro del Veneto
2000
1st Tre Valli Varesine
2nd Trofeo Matteotti
6th Gran Premio Città di Camaiore
7th Coppa Placci
2001
1st Giro del Lazio
3rd Giro del Mendrisiotto
5th Gran Premio Città di Camaiore
6th Giro del Veneto
6th Gran Premio di Lugano
7th Firenze–Pistoia
8th Subida a Urkiola
8th Giro dell'Emilia
8th Trofeo Matteotti
10th Overall Giro della Liguria
2002
5th Coppa Agostoni

=== Major competition results ===
Year	Giro d'Italia	Tour de France	Vuelta a España	Milan–San Remo	Amstel Gold Race	Liège–Bastogne–Liège	Giro di Lombardia	La Flèche Wallonne	UCI Road World Championships
1993	-	-	DNF	-	-	-	-	-	-
1994	-	-	46th	-	-	-	54th	-	-
1995	DNF	72nd	-	-	-	-	-	-	-
1996	48th	70th	-	-	-	-	-	56th	-
1997	38th	-	-	-	69th	-	-	-	-
1998	-	50th	-	-	-	-	-	-	-
1999	47th	-	-	70th	-	-	-	-	-
2000	53rd	-	-	-	-	73rd	-	-	73rd
2001	-	-	-	-	-	35th	-	41st	-
2002	-	DNF	-	-	-	62nd	-	42nd	-
