= 1996 Milan–San Remo =

Race details
- Dates: 23 March 1996
- Stages: 1
- Distance: 294 km (183 mi)
- Winning time: 7h 00' 27"

Results
| | Winner | Gabriele Colombo (ITA) | (Gewiss Playbus) |
| | Second | Alexander Gontchenkov (UKR) | (Roslotto–ZG Mobili) |
| | Third | Michele Coppolillo (ITA) | (MG Maglificio–Technogym) |

The 1996 Milan–San Remo was the 87th edition of the Milan–San Remo cycle race and was held on 23 March 1996. The race started in Milan and finished in San Remo.

The race was won by Italian rider Gabriele Colombo of the Gewiss Playbus team. During the race, Colombo and Alexander Gontchenkov set a climbing record on the Cipressa that would stand for nearly 30 years.

== General classification ==
Final general classification

| Rank | Rider | Team | Time |
|---|---|---|---|
| 1 | Gabriele Colombo (ITA) | Gewiss Playbus | 7h 00' 27" |
| 2 | Alexander Gontchenkov (UKR) | Roslotto–ZG Mobili | + 1" |
| 3 | Michele Coppolillo (ITA) | MG Maglificio–Technogym | + 1" |
| 4 | Max Sciandri (GBR) | Motorola | + 1" |
| 5 | Stefano Zanini (ITA) | Gewiss Playbus | + 32" |
| 6 | Fabio Baldato (ITA) | MG Maglificio–Technogym | + 32" |
| 7 | Mario Cipollini (ITA) | Saeco–AS Juvenes San Marino | + 32" |
| 8 | Johan Museeuw (BEL) | Mapei–GB | + 32" |
| 9 | Laurent Brochard (FRA) | Festina–Lotus | + 32" |
| 10 | Andrei Tchmil (UKR) | Lotto | + 32" |
