= 1995 Paris–Roubaix =

1995 UCI Road World Cup, race 3
- Official event poster

Race details
- Dates: April 9, 1995
- Stages: 1
- Distance: 266.5 km (165.6 mi)
- Winning time: 6h 27' 08"

Results
	Winner	Franco Ballerini (ITA)	(Mapei–GB–Latexco)
	Second	Andrei Tchmil (UKR)	(Lotto–Isoglass)
	Third	Johan Museeuw (BEL)	(Mapei–GB–Latexco)

The 93rd running of the Paris–Roubaix single-day cycling classic, often known as the Hell of the North, was held on 9 April 1995. Italian Franco Ballerini won his first of two victories, finishing two minutes ahead of the pursuing group after a 30 km solo. Andrei Tchmil won the sprint for second place before Johan Museeuw. The race started in Compiègne and finished on the velodrome of Roubaix, overing a distance of 266.5 kilometres (165.6 miles). The race served as the third leg of the 1995 UCI World Cup. 91 of 178 riders finished.

== Results ==
9-04-1995: Compiègne–Roubaix, 266 km.

Results (1–10)
	Cyclist	Team	Time
1	Franco Ballerini (ITA)	Mapei–GB–Latexco	6h 27' 08"
2	Andrei Tchmil (UKR)	Lotto–Isoglass	+ 1' 56"
3	Johan Museeuw (BEL)	Mapei–GB–Latexco	+ 1' 56"
4	Viatcheslav Ekimov (RUS)	Novell–Decca–Colnago	+ 1' 56"
5	Johan Capiot (BEL)	Refin	+ 1' 56"
6	Eric Vanderaerden (BEL)	Brescialat–Fago	+ 2' 00"
7	Fabio Baldato (ITA)	MG Maglificio–Technogym	+ 2' 00"
8	Frédéric Moncassin (FRA)	Novell–Decca–Colnago	+ 2' 00"
9	Rolf Aldag (GER)	Team Telekom	+ 2' 00"
10	Gianluca Bortolami (ITA)	Mapei–GB–Latexco	+ 2' 00"
