= 1996 Gent–Wevelgem =

Race details
- Dates: 10 April 1996
- Stages: 1
- Distance: 208 km (129 mi)
- Winning time: 4h 53' 00"

Results
	Winner	Tom Steels (BEL)	(Mapei–GB)
	Second	Giovanni Lombardi (ITA)	(Team Polti)
	Third	Fabio Baldato (ITA)	(MG Maglificio–Technogym)

The 1996 Gent–Wevelgem was the 58th edition of the Belgian Gent–Wevelgem cycle race and was held on 10 April 1996. The race started in Ghent and finished in Wevelgem. The race was won by Tom Steels of the Mapei team.

== General classification ==
Final general classification

Rank	Rider	Team	Time
1	Tom Steels (BEL)	Mapei–GB	4h 53' 00"
2	Giovanni Lombardi (ITA)	Team Polti	+ 0"
3	Fabio Baldato (ITA)	MG Maglificio–Technogym	+ 0"
4	Lars Michaelsen (DEN)	Festina–Lotus	+ 0"
5	Léon van Bon (NED)	Rabobank	+ 0"
6	Bruno Boscardin (SUI)	Festina–Lotus	+ 0"
7	Massimo Strazzer (ITA)	Brescialat	+ 0"
8	Johan Capiot (BEL)	Collstrop–Lystex	+ 0"
9	Andrei Tchmil (UKR)	Lotto	+ 0"
10	Silvio Martinello (ITA)	Saeco–AS Juvenes San Marino	+ 0"
