= Stefano Zanini =

Italian cyclist

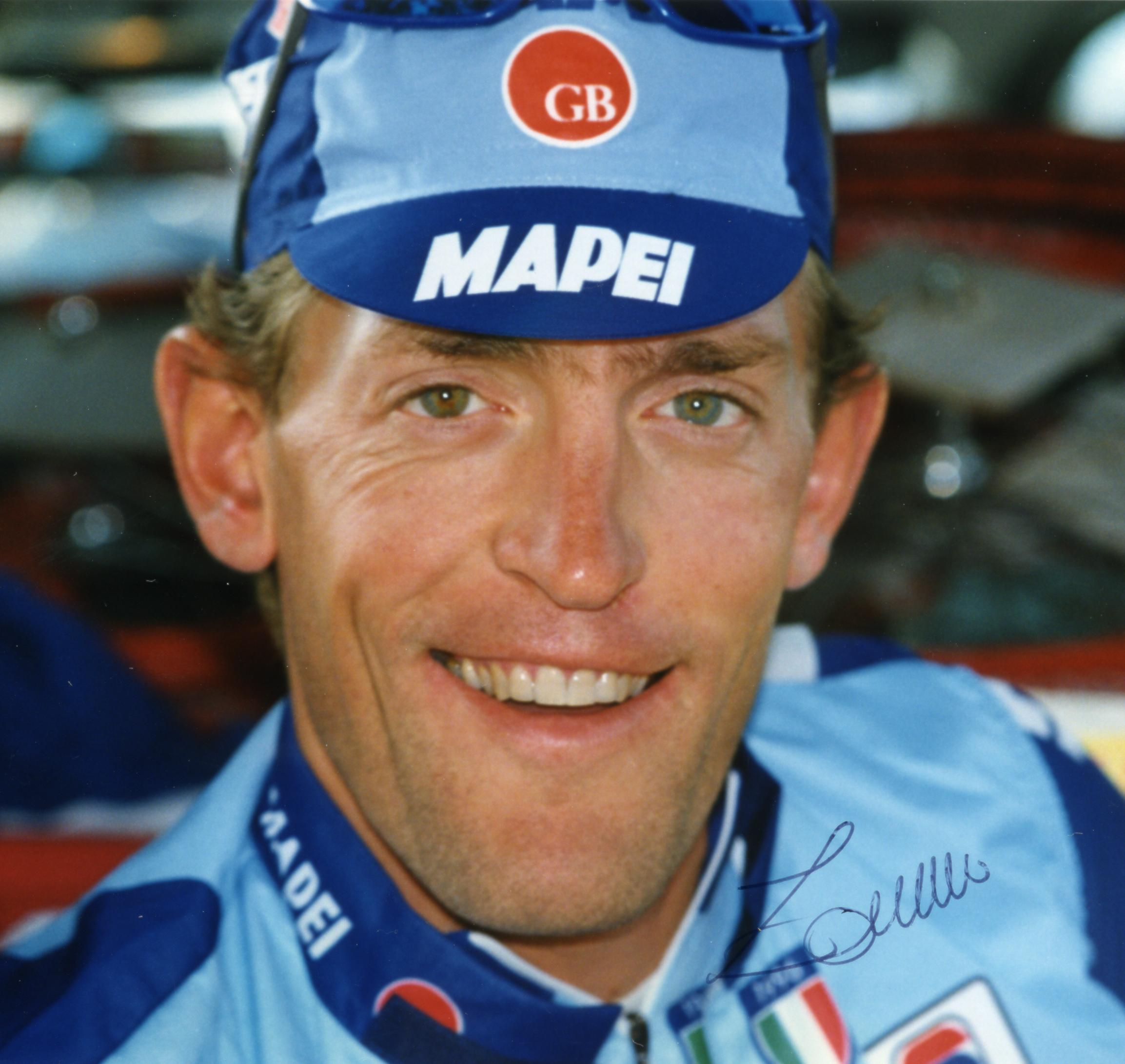

Personal information
- Full name: Stefano Zanini
- Nickname: Maciste
- Born: 23 January 1969 (age 57) Varese, Italy

Cycling career
- Sport: Cycling
- Discipline: Road
- Role: Directeur sportif

Professional teams
- 1991–1994: Italbonifica-Navigare
- 1995–1996: Gewiss–Ballan
- 1997–2002: Mapei-GB
- 2003: Saeco
- 2004–2005: Quick-Step–Davitamon
- 2006: Liquigas
- 2007: Predictor–Lotto

Major wins
- Grand Tours Tour de France 1 individual stage (2000) Giro d'Italia Intergiro classification (2005) 2 individual stages (1994, 2001) One-day races and Classics Amstel Gold Race (1996) Milano–Torino (1995)

Stefano Zanini (born 23 January 1969 in Varese, Lombardy) is an Italian former professional road racing cyclist, the leadout man for Liquigas-Bianchi in 2006, after riding for Mapei, Saeco, and Quick-Step.

His palmares include the Milano–Torino of 1995, Amstel Gold Race in 1996, one stage of the 2000 Tour de France and two stages at the Giro d'Italia (1994 and 2001).

He retired at the end of 2007 and took up the role of directeur sportif with the Silence-Lotto team. He is currently a directeur sportif with Astana Pro Team.

His name was on the list of doping tests published by the French Senate on 24 July 2013 that were collected during the 1998 Tour de France and found suspicious for EPO when retested in 2004.

== Major results ==
1987
1st Overall Giro della Lunigiana
1989
2nd Overall Giro Ciclistico d'Italia
1st Coppa Collecchio
1990
5th Gran Premio della Liberazione
1992
1st Coppa Sabatini
1st Stage 5 Giro di Puglia
1st Stage 7 Volta a Portugal
2nd Giro dell'Etna
5th Giro di Campania
1993
5th Coppa Sabatini
5th Trofeo Melinda
1994
1st Giro dell'Etna
1st Stage 22 Giro d'Italia
2nd Nice–Alassio
3rd Tre Valli Varesine
4th Milan–San Remo
6th Giro del Piemonte
10th Overall Tirreno–Adriatico

1st Stage 5

1995
1st Milano–Torino
1st Coppa Bernocchi
1st Stage 7 Tirreno–Adriatico
2nd Giro del Piemonte
2nd Trofeo Laigueglia
2nd Nice–Alassio
2nd Japan Cup
3rd Milan–San Remo
5th Giro di Lombardia
9th Rund um den Henninger-Turm
1996
1st Amstel Gold Race
1st Stage 3 Tour of the Basque Country
1st Stage 5a Setmana Catalana de Ciclisme
2nd Milano–Torino
4th Paris–Roubaix
5th Milan–San Remo
5th Giro dell'Etna
5th GP Industria & Artigianato di Larciano
Giro d'Italia

Held after Stage 3
Held after Stages 2 & 3

1997
1st Gran Premio Bruno Beghelli
Tour of the Basque Country

1st Stages 3 & 5a

2nd Coppa Bernocchi
8th Milano–Torino
1998
1st Paris–Brussels
1st Gran Premio Bruno Beghelli
1st Stage 3a Three Days of De Panne
2nd Tour of Flanders
4th Milan–San Remo
4th Paris–Tours
8th Breitling Grand Prix (with Daniele Nardello)
10th Coppa Bernocchi
1999
1st Stage 5a Volta a la Comunitat Valenciana
2000
1st Stage 21 Tour de France
1st Stage 10 Tour de Suisse
1st Stage 3 Tour of the Basque Country
5th Paris–Roubaix
10th Kuurne–Brussels–Kuurne
2001
1st Stage 7 Giro d'Italia
1st Stage 2 Tour of the Basque Country
1st Stage 2 Giro Riviera Ligure Ponente
1st Stage 1 Tour of Slovenia
5th Gran Premio Bruno Beghelli
8th Giro della Provincia di Siracusa
2002
2nd Overall Three Days of De Panne

1st Points classification
1st Stage 1

2003
1st US Pro Championship
5th Firenze–Pistoia
7th Paris–Tours
8th Giro del Piemonte
9th HEW Cyclassics
2004
1st Stage 1 Tour of Britain
5th Coppa Bernocchi
2005
1st Intergiro classification Giro d'Italia

=== Grand Tour general classification results timeline ===
Grand Tour	1991	1992	1993	1994	1995	1996	1997	1998	1999	2000	2001	2002	2003	2004	2005	2006	2007
Giro d'Italia	104	102	—	48	—	DNF	—	—	—	—	93	—	—	—	111	—	134
Tour de France	—	—	—	—	—	DNF	—	73	—	81	DNF	—	DNF	126	DNF	—	—
/ Vuelta a España	—	—	91	—	DNF	64	DNF	—	DNF	—	—	—	—	—	—	—	—

Legend
—	Did not compete
DNF	Did not finish
