= 1995 Tour of Flanders =

1995 UCI Road World Cup, race 2
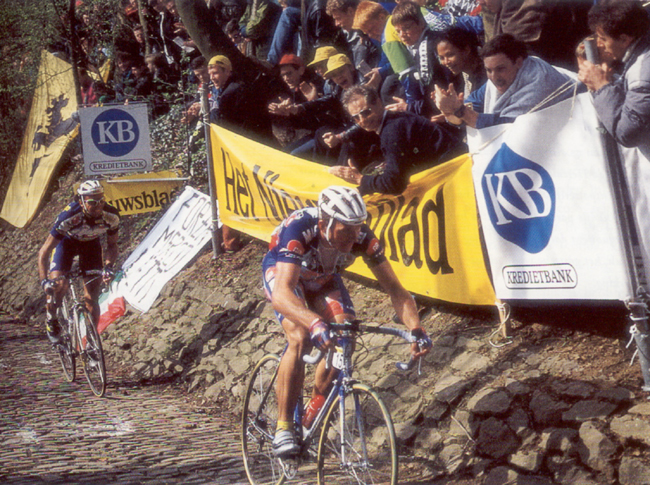
- Johan Museeuw and Fabio Baldato on the Muur van Geraardsbergen

Race details
- Dates: 2 April 1995
- Stages: 1
- Distance: 261 km (162 mi)
- Winning time: 6h 36' 24"

Results
	Winner	Johan Museeuw (BEL)	(Mapei-GB)
	Second	Fabio Baldato (ITA)	(MG-Technogym)
	Third	Andrei Tchmil (MDA)	(Lotto)

The 79th running of the Tour of Flanders cycling race in Belgium was held on Sunday 2 April 1995. It was the second leg of the 1995 UCI Road World Cup. Belgian Johan Museeuw won his second victory in the monument classic. The race started in Sint-Niklaas and finished in Meerbeke (Ninove).

== Race summary ==
Pre-race favourite Johan Museeuw punctured on the Paddestraat, but returned before the race finale. Museeuw attacked on the Berendries climb, 33 km before the finish, in pursuit of Fabio Baldato and the two worked together until the Muur van Geraardsbergen. Museeuw distanced Baldato on the steep upper slopes of the Muur and powered on to the finish, taking his second win. Andrei Tchmil caught Baldato in the final kilometers, but was beaten by the Italian in the sprint for second place.

== Climbs ==
There were fifteen categorized climbs:

- Tiegemberg
- Kluisberg
- Knokteberg
- Oude Kwaremont
- Paterberg
- Kortekeer
- Taaienberg
- Eikenberg
- Volkegemberg
- Varent
- Leberg
- Molenberg
- Berendries
- Muur-Kapelmuur
- Bosberg

== Results ==
	Cyclist	Team	Time
1	Johan Museeuw (BEL)	Mapei–GB–Latexco	6h 36' 24"
2	Fabio Baldato (ITA)	MG Maglificio–Technogym	+ 1' 27"
3	Andrei Tchmil (UKR)	Lotto–Isoglass	s.t.
4	Claudio Chiappucci (ITA)	Carrera Jeans–Tassoni	+ 2' 03"
5	Gianluca Bortolami (ITA)	Mapei–GB–Latexco	s.t.
6	Jesper Skibby (DEN)	TVM–Polis Direct	s.t.
7	Michele Bartoli (ITA)	Mercatone Uno–Saeco	+ 2' 05"
8	Viatcheslav Ekimov (RUS)	Novell–Decca–Colnago	+ 3' 25"
9	Max Sciandri (GBR)	MG Maglificio–Technogym	s.t.
10	Franco Ballerini (ITA)	Mapei–GB–Latexco	s.t.
