= 1995 Clásica de San Sebastián =

Race details
- Dates: 12 August 1995
- Stages: 1
- Distance: 230 km (142.9 mi)
- Winning time: 5h 31' 17"

Results
	Winner	Lance Armstrong (USA)	(Motorola)
	Second	Stefano Della Santa (ITA)	(Mapei–GB–Latexco)
	Third	Johan Museeuw (BEL)	(Mapei–GB–Latexco)

The 1995 Clásica de San Sebastián was the 15th edition of the Clásica de San Sebastián cycle race and was held on 12 August 1995. The race started and finished in San Sebastián. The race was won by Lance Armstrong of the Motorola team.

== General classification ==
Final general classification

Rank	Rider	Team	Time
1	Lance Armstrong (USA)	Motorola	5h 31' 17"
2	Stefano Della Santa (ITA)	Mapei–GB–Latexco	+ 2"
3	Johan Museeuw (BEL)	Mapei–GB–Latexco	+ 27"
4	Laurent Jalabert (FRA)	ONCE	+ 27"
5	Gianni Bugno (ITA)	MG Maglificio–Technogym	+ 27"
6	Leonardo Piepoli (ITA)	Refin	+ 30"
7	Max Sciandri (GBR)	MG Maglificio–Technogym	+ 1' 50"
8	Frank Vandenbroucke (BEL)	Mapei–GB–Latexco	+ 1' 50"
9	Miguel Induráin (ESP)	Banesto	+ 1' 50"
10	Bruno Cenghialta (ITA)	Gewiss–Ballan	+ 1' 50"
