= 1995 Milan–San Remo =

1995 UCI Road World Cup, race 1
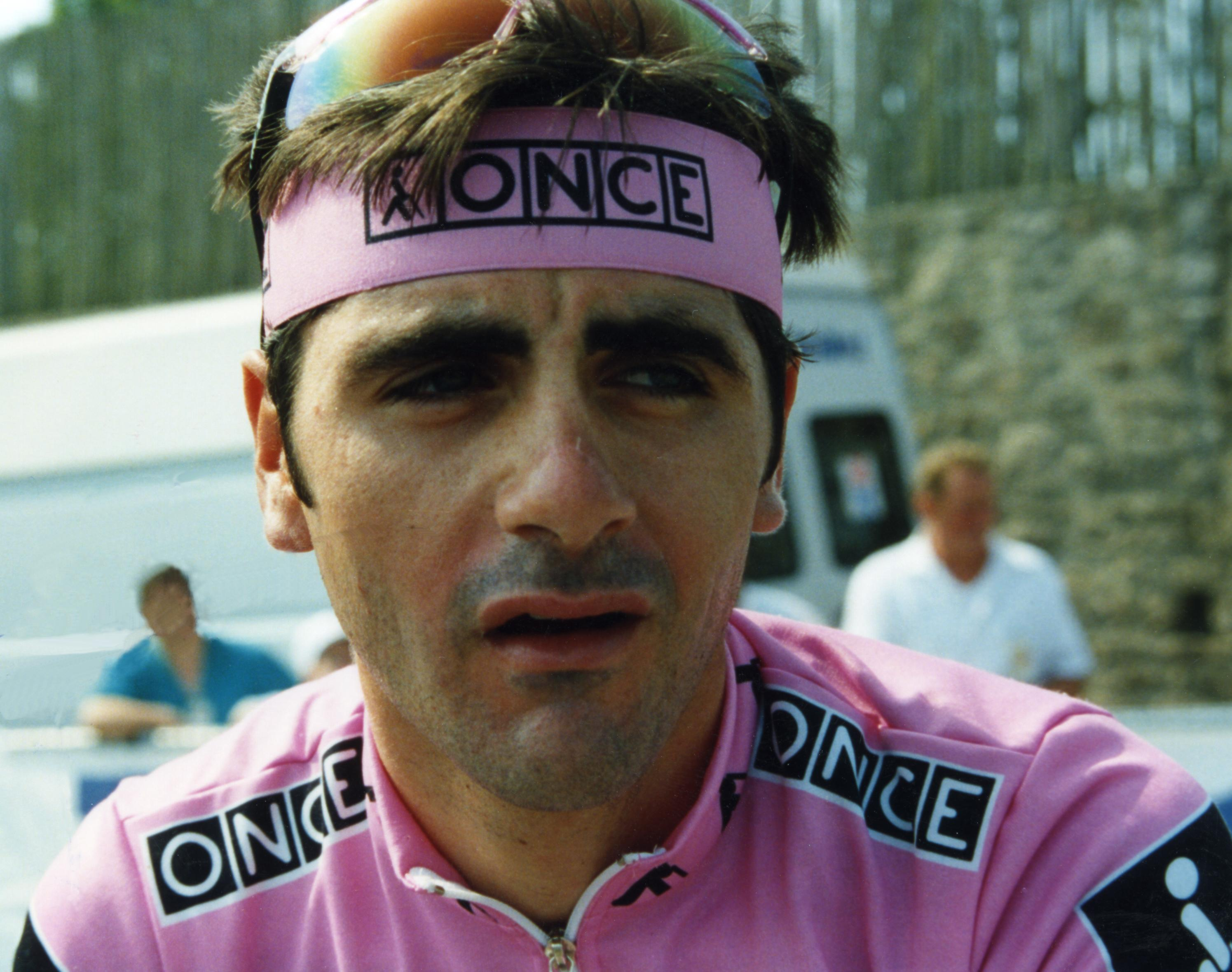
- Frenchman Laurent Jalabert won the 86th Milan–San Remo

Race details
- Dates: 18 March 1995
- Stages: 1
- Distance: 294 km (183 mi)
- Winning time: 6h 45' 20"

Results
	Winner	Laurent Jalabert (FRA)	(ONCE)
	Second	Maurizio Fondriest (ITA)	(Lampre–Panaria)
	Third	Stefano Zanini (ITA)	(Gewiss–Ballan)

The 86th running of the Milan–San Remo cycling classic was held on 18 March 1995 and won by French rider Laurent Jalabert in a two-man sprint with Maurizio Fondriest. It was the first leg of the 1995 UCI Road World Cup. 162 of 193 riders finished.

== Race summary ==
First-year professional Cristian Salvato was in a solo breakaway for 220 km. Russian favourite Evgueni Berzin punctured on the descent of Cipressa, but returned after a furious pursuit. On the Poggio, Italian classics specialist Maurizio Fondriest broke clear, followed by Laurent Jalabert. On the descent, a chase group of five, with Dimitri Konyshev, Stefano Zanini, Davide Rebellin and Michele Bartoli, was slowed down by a mechanical problem of Konyshev who piloted the group. Jalabert and Fondriest headed off in a two-man sprint on San Remo's Via Roma, with Jalabert easily taking the honours.

The 26-year old Jalabert became the fourth rider to win the classicissima after winning Paris–Nice one week prior – joining Fred De Bruyne, Eddy Merckx and Sean Kelly. The day after the race, French sports daily l'Équipe titled: "un champion nous est donné" (a champion was given to us).

== Results ==
Result
Rank	Rider	Team	Time
1	Laurent Jalabert (FRA)	ONCE	6h 45' 20"
2	Maurizio Fondriest (ITA)	Lampre–Panaria	s.t.
3	Stefano Zanini (ITA)	Gewiss–Ballan	+ 4"
4	Davide Rebellin (ITA)	MG Maglificio–Technogym	s.t.
5	Michele Bartoli (ITA)	Mercatone Uno–Saeco	s.t.
6	Fabiano Fontanelli (ITA)	ZG Mobili–Selle Italia	+ 13"
7	Dimitri Konyshev (RUS)	Aki–Gipiemme	+ 14"
8	Claudio Chiappucci (ITA)	Carrera Jeans–Tassoni	+ 17"
9	Jesper Skibby (DEN)	TVM–Polis Direct	s.t.
10	Fabio Baldato (ITA)	MG Maglificio–Technogym	s.t.
