= 2003 HEW Cyclassics =

Race details
- Dates: 3 August 2003
- Stages: 1
- Distance: 253.2 km (157.3 mi)
- Winning time: 5h 58' 20"

Results
	Winner	Paolo Bettini (ITA)
	Second	Davide Rebellin (ITA)
	Third	Jan Ullrich (GER)

The 2003 HEW Cyclassics was the eighth edition of the HEW Cyclassics cycle race and was held on 3 August 2003. The race started and finished in Hamburg. The race was won by Paolo Bettini.

== General classification ==
Final general classification

Rank	Rider	Team	Time
1	Paolo Bettini (ITA)	Quick-Step–Davitamon	5h 58' 20"
2	Davide Rebellin (ITA)	Gerolsteiner	s.t.
3	Jan Ullrich (GER)	Team Bianchi	s.t.
4	Igor Astarloa (ESP)	Saeco	s.t.
5	Mirko Celestino (ITA)	Saeco	s.t.
6	Erik Zabel (GER)	Team Telekom	+ 3"
7	Fabio Baldato (ITA)	Alessio	s.t.
8	Giovanni Lombardi (ITA)	Domina Vacanze-Elitron	s.t.
9	Stefano Zanini (ITA)	Saeco	s.t.
10	Andrea Ferrigato (ITA)	Alessio	s.t.
