= 1995 Giro di Lombardia =

Race details
- Dates: 21 October 1995
- Stages: 1
- Distance: 252 km (156.6 mi)
- Winning time: 5h 49' 02"

Results
	Winner	Gianni Faresin (ITA)	(Lampre–Panaria)
	Second	Daniele Nardello (ITA)	(Mapei–GB–Latexco)
	Third	Michele Bartoli (ITA)	(Mercatone Uno–Saeco)

The 1995 Giro di Lombardia was the 89th edition of the Giro di Lombardia cycle race and was held on 21 October 1995. The race started in Varese and finished in Bergamo. The race was won by Gianni Faresin of the Lampre team.

== General classification ==
Final general classification

Rank	Rider	Team	Time
1	Gianni Faresin (ITA)	Lampre–Panaria	5h 49' 02"
2	Daniele Nardello (ITA)	Mapei–GB–Latexco	+ 19"
3	Michele Bartoli (ITA)	Mercatone Uno–Saeco	+ 19"
4	Rolf Sørensen (DEN)	MG Maglificio–Technogym	+ 56"
5	Stefano Zanini (ITA)	Gewiss–Ballan	+ 1' 02"
6	Claudio Chiappucci (ITA)	Carrera Jeans–Tassoni	+ 1' 02"
7	Francesco Casagrande (ITA)	Mercatone Uno–Saeco	+ 1' 02"
8	Pascal Richard (SUI)	MG Maglificio–Technogym	+ 1' 02"
9	Roberto Pistore (ITA)	Polti–Granarolo–Santini	+ 1' 02"
10	Felice Puttini (SUI)	Refin	+ 1' 02"
