= Eschborn–Frankfurt =

German one-day road cycling race

Race details
- Date: 1 May
- Region: Hesse, Germany
- English name: Eschborn–Frankfurt – Lap of the Finanzplatz
- Discipline: Road
- Competition: UCI World Tour
- Type: One-day
- Organiser: ASO
- Web site: www.eschborn-frankfurt.de

History
- First edition: 1962
- Editions: 63 (as of 2026)
- First winner: Armand Desmet (BEL)
- Most wins: Alexander Kristoff (NOR) (4 wins)
- Most recent: Georg Zimmermann (GER)

Eschborn–Frankfurt, previously Rund um den Henninger Turm Frankfurt, is an annual semi classic cycling race in Germany, starting in Eschborn and finishing in Frankfurt. The event, sometimes referred to as the Frankfurt Grand Prix, is held annually on 1 May, national Labour Day in Germany.

As from 2017, Eschborn–Frankfurt is part of the UCI World Tour, the highest-rated professional men's road races, making it the second German World Tour event, together with the Hamburg Cyclassics in August. The event is organised by ASO.

== History ==
The event was first held on 1 May 1962, as Rund um den Henninger Turm Frankfurt, starting and finishing in Frankfurt's city centre. Brothers Hermann and Erwin Moos sought to promote the Henninger Tower, a grain silo belonging to the Henninger Brewery, which opened in 1961. Henninger served as main sponsor of the cycling event from the inaugural race until 2008. Rund um den Henninger Turm received a status upgrade in 1967 when Paris–Brussels, organised in late April, was removed from the calendar due to traffic problems and the event became the pre-eminent one-day cycling race in West Germany.

The race's first winner was Belgian Armand Desmet in 1962. Barry Hoban became the first British winner in 1966 after a 50 km solo ride to the finish, holding the chasing pack at one minute. Legendary cyclist Eddy Merckx won the race solo in 1971. Sprinter Erik Zabel held the record for most victories in the race with three (1999, 2002 and 2005) until Alexander Kristoff in 2018 added a fourth victory to his 2014, 2016 and 2017 wins, and therefore becoming sole record-holder. Seven further riders have won twice.

In 1995, Rund um den Henninger Turm was part of the UCI Road World Cup, cycling's season-long competition of the most important one-day races in the 1990s. The fixed date of the event however, every 1 May, was considered unfavourable as it was often midweek, and it was replaced with the newly created HEW Cyclassics in Hamburg as the German leg of the series.

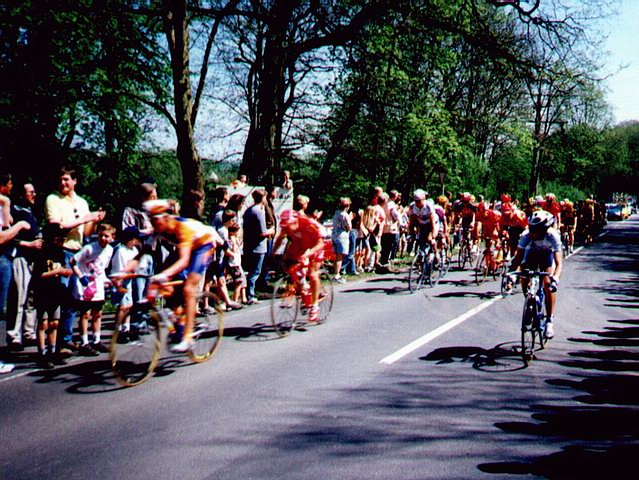
Peloton during the 2001 race in Kronberg im Taunus

In 2008, organiser Bernd Moos stated Henninger would withdraw its sponsorship of the race. Henninger discontinued its funding after 46 years because of economic conditions. The event continued in 2009 as the Eschborn–Frankfurt City Loop, named after its city sponsors, Frankfurt and the neighboring town of Eschborn, which also became the start location of the race. The iconic Henninger Tower was demolished in 2013.

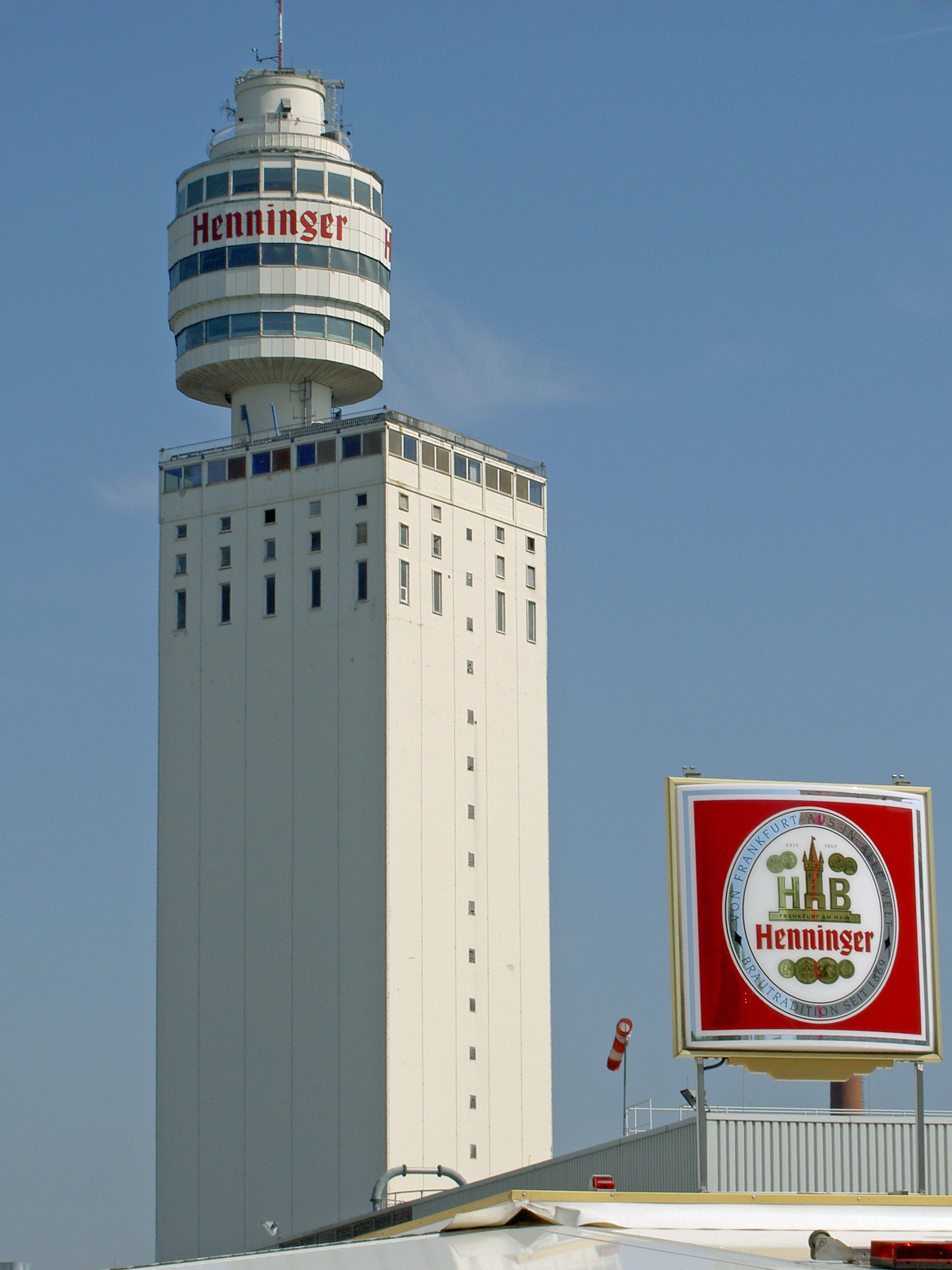
The now demolished Henninger Tower (pictured in 2005) in Frankfurt am Main served as the race's name sponsor from 1962 until 2008.

The 2015 event was cancelled on the eve of the race due to a suspected terrorist plot; the 2020 edition was cancelled due to the COVID-19 pandemic. In 2017, Eschborn–Frankfurt was included in the UCI World Tour, cycling's highest rated professional events, and organisation was taken on by ASO, which also organises cycling's flagships, the Tour de France and Paris–Roubaix.

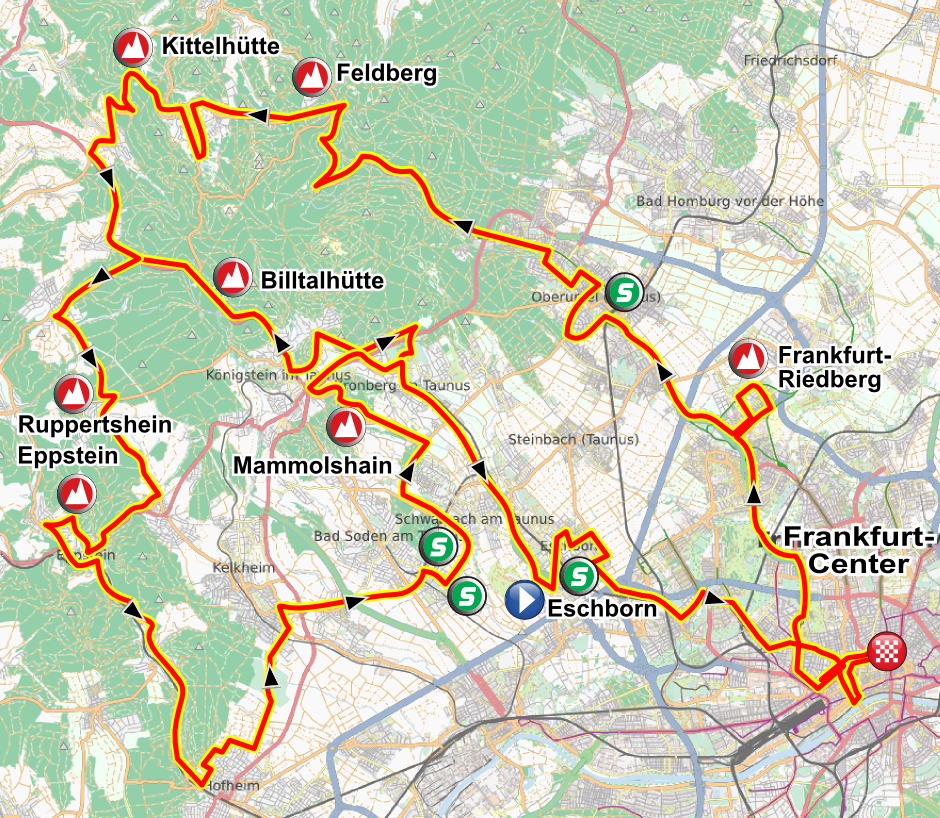
Route of the 2011 event. The race starts in Eschborn and finishes in Frankfurt's city centre, totaling around 220 km, mainly through the Taunus Hills.

== Route ==
The race passes through the Taunus Hills west of Frankfurt, along a winding and hilly course with around 1500m (5,000 feet) of climbing. The climbs of the Feldberg, Ruppershain and Mammolshain are some of the regular features. The Mammolshain has a maximal gradient of 26% and is climbed twice in the race. The race ends with three laps of 4,5 km in the centre of Frankfurt, covering a total distance of around over 220 kilometres (140 mi).

Until 2008 the start and finish of the race was on Hainer Weg and later Darmstädter Landstraße, in front of the Henninger Tower.

Since the event's restyling in 2009, the race starts in Eschborn, 13 kilometres (8.1 mi) west of Frankfurt – the finish was at the housing development Riedberg. Since 2010, the finish is in front of the Alte Oper (Old Opera), Frankfurt's concert hall and former opera house in the city centre.

== Race winners ==
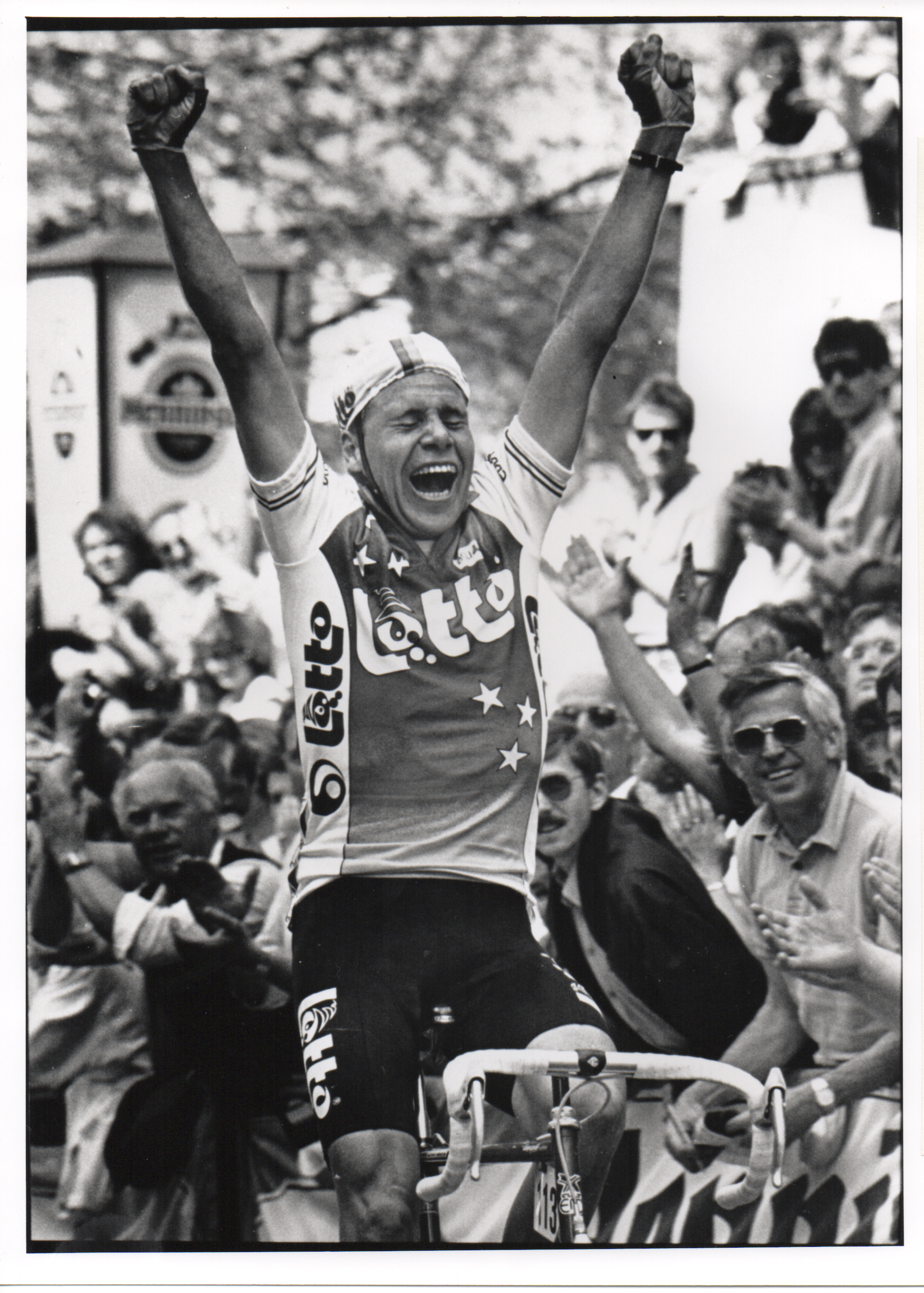
Belgian Michel Dernies celebrates as he crosses the finishing line to win the Round the Henninger Tower cycle race in Frankfurt, Germany on May 1, 1988.

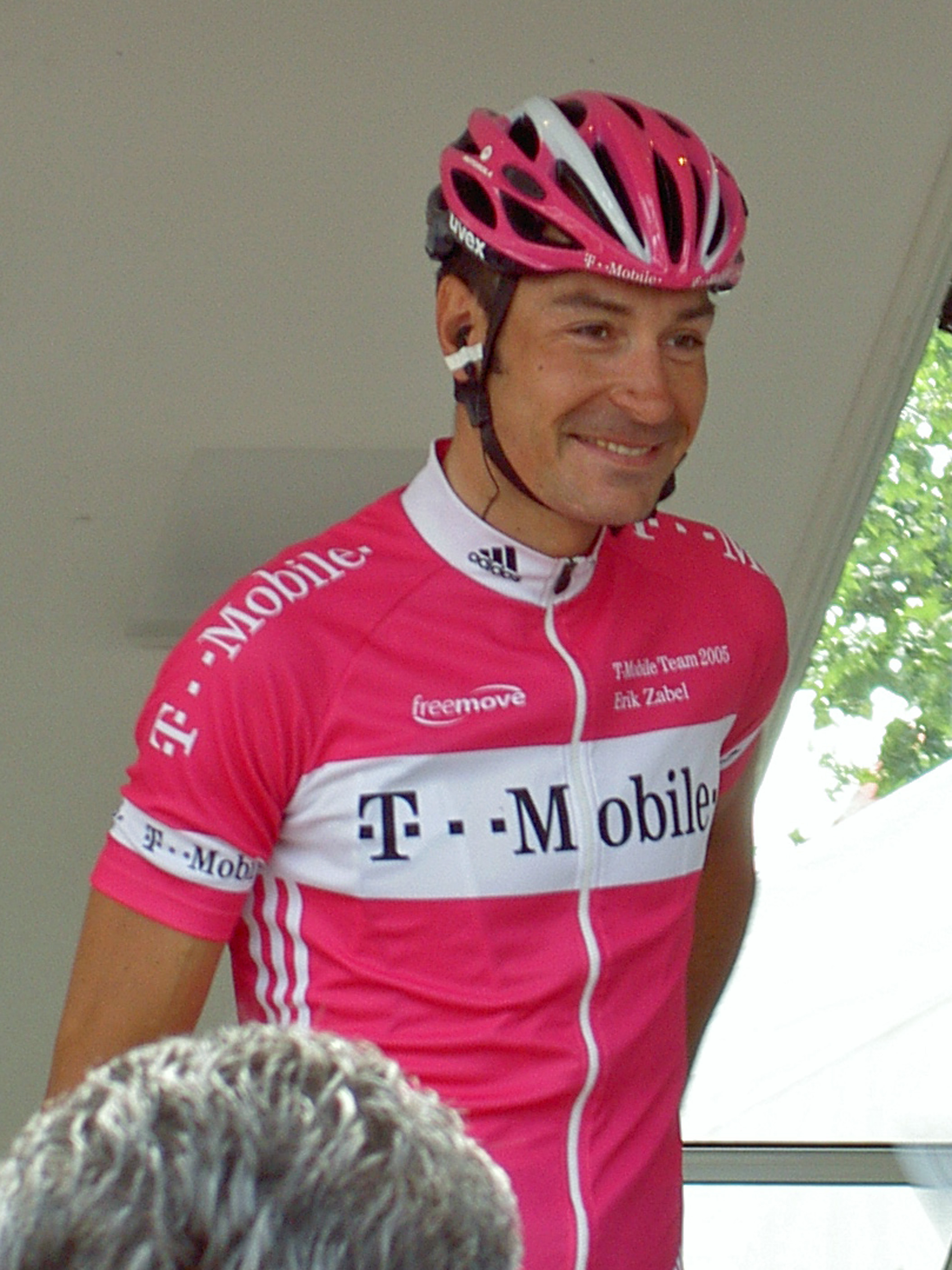
Erik Zabel (pictured in 2005) has won the race three times (1999, 2002 and 2005).

Year	Country	Rider	Team
↓ "Rund um den Henninger-Turm" ↓
1962	Belgium	Armand Desmet	Flandria–Faema–Clément
1963	West Germany	Hans Junkermann	Wiel's–Groene Leeuw
1964	Belgium	Clément Roman	Flandria–Romeo
1965	France	Jean Stablinski	Ford France–Gitane
1966	Great Britain	Barry Hoban	Mercier–BP–Hutchinson
1967	Belgium	Daniel Van Rijckeghem	Mann–Grundig
1968	Netherlands	Eddy Beugels	Mercier–BP–Hutchinson
1969	Belgium	Georges Pintens	Mann–Grundig
1970	West Germany	Rudi Altig	G.B.C.–Zimba
1971	Belgium	Eddy Merckx	Molteni
1972	France	Gilbert Bellone	Rokado
1973	Belgium	Georges Pintens	Rokado–De Gribaldy
1974	Belgium	Walter Godefroot	Carpenter–Confortluxe–Flandria
1975	Netherlands	Roy Schuiten	TI–Raleigh
1976	Belgium	Freddy Maertens	Flandria–Velda
1977	Netherlands	Gerrie Knetemann	TI–Raleigh
1978	West Germany	Gregor Braun	Peugeot–Esso–Michelin
1979	Belgium	Daniel Willems	IJsboerke–Warncke Eis
1980	Italy	Gianbattista Baronchelli	Bianchi–Piaggio
1981	Belgium	Jos Jacobs	Capri Sonne
1982	Belgium	Ludo Peeters	TI–Raleigh–Campagnolo
1983	Belgium	Ludo Peeters	TI–Raleigh–Campagnolo
1984	Australia	Phil Anderson	Panasonic–Raleigh
1985	Australia	Phil Anderson	Panasonic–Raleigh
1986	Belgium	Jean-Marie Wampers	Hitachi–Splendor
1987	Norway	Dag Otto Lauritzen	7 Eleven
1988	Belgium	Michel Dernies	Lotto
1989	Belgium	Jean-Marie Wampers	Panasonic–Isostar–Colnago–Agu
1990	Switzerland	Thomas Wegmüller	Weinmann–SMM Uster
1991	Belgium	Johan Bruyneel	Lotto
1992	Belgium	Frank Van Den Abeele	Lotto–Mavic–MBK
1993	Denmark	Rolf Sørensen	Carrera Jeans–Tassoni
1994	Germany	Olaf Ludwig	Team Telekom
1995	Italy	Francesco Frattini	Gewiss–Ballan
1996	Switzerland	Beat Zberg	Carrera Jeans–Tassoni
1997	Italy	Michele Bartoli	MG Maglificio–Technogym
1998	Italy	Fabio Baldato	Riso Scotti–MG Maglificio
1999	Germany	Erik Zabel	Team Telekom
2000	Germany	Kai Hundertmarck	Team Telekom
2001	Switzerland	Markus Zberg	Rabobank
2002	Germany	Erik Zabel	Team Telekom
2003	Italy	Davide Rebellin	Gerolsteiner
2004	Netherlands	Karsten Kroon	Rabobank
2005	Germany	Erik Zabel	T-Mobile Team
2006	Italy	Stefano Garzelli	Liquigas
2007	Germany	Patrik Sinkewitz	T-Mobile Team
↓ "Eschborn-Frankfurt City Loop" ↓
2008	Netherlands	Karsten Kroon	Team CSC
↓ "Rund um den Finanzplatz Eschborn-Frankfurt" ↓
2009	Germany	Fabian Wegmann	Team Milram
2010	Germany	Fabian Wegmann	Team Milram
2011	Germany	John Degenkolb	HTC–Highroad
2012	Italy	Moreno Moser	Liquigas–Cannondale
2013	Slovenia	Simon Špilak	Team Katusha
2014	Norway	Alexander Kristoff	Team Katusha
2015	No race due to security alert		
2016	Norway	Alexander Kristoff	Team Katusha
2017	Norway	Alexander Kristoff	Team Katusha–Alpecin
↓ "Eschborn-Frankfurt" ↓
2018	Norway	Alexander Kristoff	UAE Team Emirates
2019	Germany	Pascal Ackermann	Bora–Hansgrohe
2020	No race due to the COVID-19 pandemic		
2021	Belgium	Jasper Philipsen	Alpecin–Fenix
2022	Ireland	Sam Bennett	Bora–Hansgrohe
2023	Denmark	Søren Kragh Andersen	Alpecin–Deceuninck
2024	Belgium	Maxim Van Gils	Lotto–Dstny
2025	Australia	Michael Matthews	Team Jayco–AlUla
2026	Germany	Georg Zimmermann	Lotto–Intermarché

=== Multiple-time winners ===
Wins	Rider	Years
4	Alexander Kristoff (NOR)	2014, 2016, 2017, 2018
3	Erik Zabel (GER)	1999, 2002, 2005
2	Georges Pintens (BEL)	1969, 1973
2	Ludo Peeters (BEL)	1982, 1983
2	Phil Anderson (AUS)	1984, 1985
2	Jean-Marie Wampers (BEL)	1986, 1989
2	Karsten Kroon (NED)	2004, 2008
2	Fabian Wegmann (GER)	2009, 2010

=== Wins per country ===
Wins	Country
19	Belgium
14	Germany (including West Germany)
7	Italy
5	Netherlands; Norway
3	Australia; Switzerland
2	Denmark; France
1	Great Britain; Ireland; Slovenia
