= Trofeo Pantalica =

Professional road bicycle race in Italy

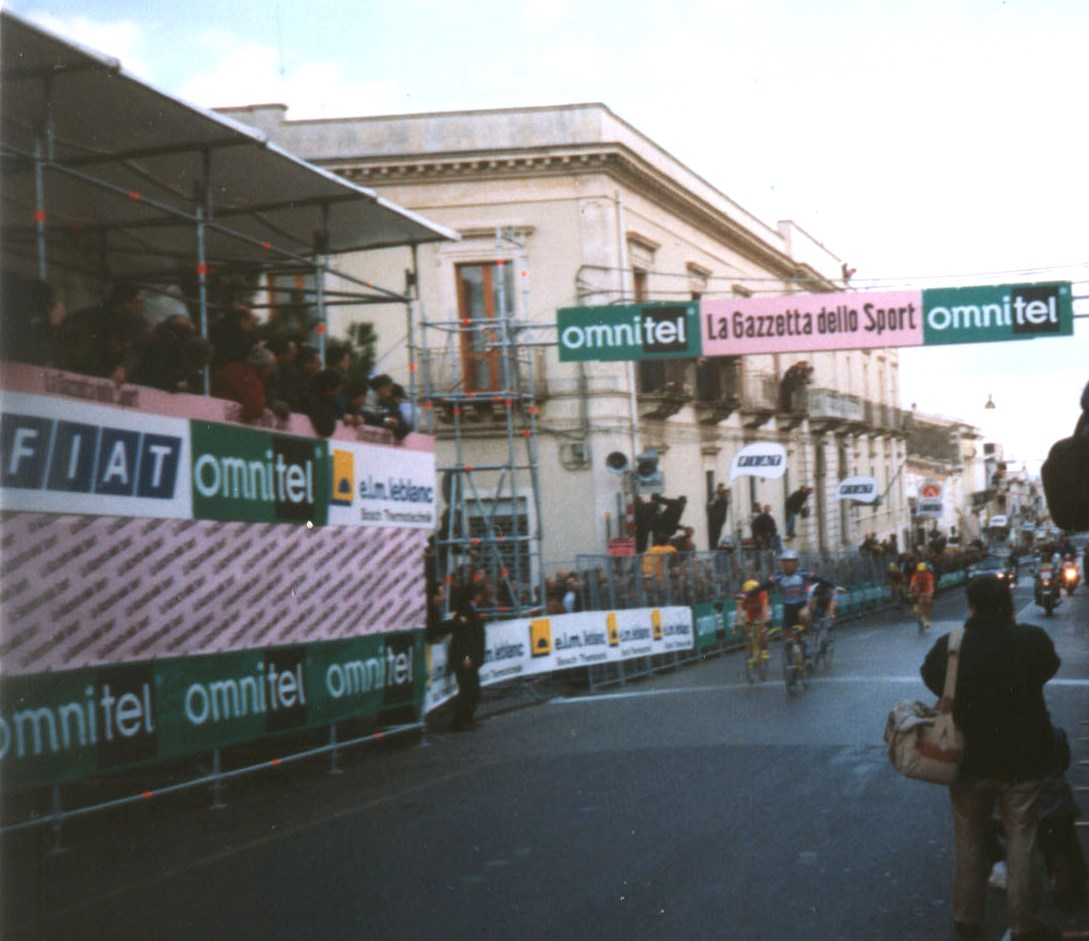

Race details
- Date: Early March
- Region: Province of Syracuse, Italy
- English name: Trophy Pantalica
- Local name: Trofeo Pantalica (in Italian)
- Discipline: Road
- Competition: UCI Europe Tour
- Type: Single-day
- Organiser: RCS Sport

History
- First edition: 1975
- Editions: 28
- Final edition: 2003
- First winner: Roger De Vlaeminck (BEL)
- Most wins: Giuseppe Saronni (ITA) (5 wins)
- Final winner: Miguel Ángel Martín Perdiguero (ESP)

The Trofeo Pantalica was a professional road bicycle race held annually in Province of Syracuse, Italy. The last edition took place in 2003.

== Winners ==
Year	Country	Rider	Team
1975	Belgium	Roger De Vlaeminck	
1976	Italy	Francesco Moser	
1977	Italy	Giuseppe Saronni	
1978	Italy	Giuseppe Saronni	
1979	Italy	Giovanni Battaglin	
1980	Italy	Giuseppe Saronni	
1981	Sweden	Tommy Prim	
1982	Italy	Giuseppe Saronni	
1983	Italy	Francesco Moser	
1984	Italy	Pierino Gavazzi	
1985	Italy	Giuseppe Saronni	
1986	Italy	Francesco Cesarini	
1987	Italy	Daniele Caroli	
1988	Canada	Steve Bauer	
1989	Denmark	Rolf Sørensen	
1990	Italy	Adriano Baffi	
1991	Australia	Scott Sunderland	
1992	Russia	Dimitri Zhdanov	
1994	Italy	Giorgio Furlan	
1995	Italy	Stefano Colagè	
1996	Italy	Fabiano Fontanelli	
1997	Italy	Michele Coppolillo	
1998	Italy	Stefano Colagè	
1999	Italy	Andrea Ferrigato	
2000	Italy	Danilo Di Luca	
2001	Italy	Roberto Petito	
2002	Italy	Fabio Baldato	
2003	Spain	Miguel Ángel Martín Perdiguero	
