= Tre Valli Varesine =

Italian one-day road cycling race

Race details
- Date: October
- Region: Lombardy, Italy
- English name: Three Varesine Valleys
- Local name: Tre Valli Varesine (in Italian)
- Discipline: Road
- Competition: UCI ProSeries; UCI Women's ProSeries
- Type: One-day
- Organiser: Società Ciclistica Alfredo Binda
- Web site: trevallivaresine.info

History (men)
- First edition: 1919
- Editions: 104 (as of 2026)
- First winner: Piero Bestetti (ITA)
- Most wins: Gianni Motta (ITA); Giuseppe Saronni (ITA) (4 wins)
- Most recent: Jarno Widar (BEL)

History (women)
- First edition: 2021
- Editions: 6 (as of 2026)
- First winner: Arlenis Sierra (CUB)
- Most wins: No repeat winners
- Most recent: Eleonora Gasparrini (ITA)

The Tre Valli Varesine is a semi classic European bicycle race held in Varese, Italy. From 2005 to 2019, the race was organised as a 1.HC event on the UCI Europe Tour. In 2021 it joined the UCI ProSeries calendar after being cancelled in 2020. A women's edition has been held since 2021, joining the UCI Women's ProSeries from 2024.

It is usually the first and most important race of Trittico Lombardo, which consists of three races held around the region of Lombardy on three consecutive days. These races are Tre Valli Varesine, Coppa Ugo Agostoni and Coppa Bernocchi.

== Winners ==
=== Men ===
Year	Country	Rider	Team
1919	Italy	Piero Bestetti	
1920	Italy	Raimondo Rosa	
1921	Italy	Luigi Gilardi	
1922	Italy	Domenico Piemontesi	
1923	Italy	Felice Brusatori	
1924	Italy	Libero Ferrario	
1925	Italy	Giovanni Tizzoni	
1926	Italy	Mario Bonvicini	
1927	Italy	Renato Zanone	
1928	Italy	Battista Visconti	
1929	Italy	Ambrogio Morelli	Gloria–Hutchinson
1930	Italy	Albino Binda	Legnano–Pirelli
1931	Italy	Luigi Giacobbe	Maino–Clément
1932	Italy	Domenico Piemontesi	Gloria–Hutchinson
1933	Italy	Alfredo Bovet	Bianchi
1934	Italy	Severino Canavesi	Legnano
1935	Italy	Piero Chiappini	amateur
1936	Italy	Cesare Del Cancia	Ganna
1937	Italy	Olimpio Bizzi	Fréjus
1938	Italy	Gino Bartali	Legnano
1939	Italy	Olimpio Bizzi	Fréjus
1940	Italy	Cino Cinelli	Bianchi
1941	Italy	Fausto Coppi	Legnano
1942	Italy	Luciano Succi	Olmo
1943– 1944	No race		
1945	Italy	Adolfo Leoni	Bianchi
1946	Italy	Enrico Mollo	Benotto-Superga
1947	Italy	Fiorenzo Magni	Viscontea
1948	Italy	Fausto Coppi	Bianchi
1949	Italy	Nedo Logli	Arbos
1950	Italy	Antonio Bevilacqua	Wilier Triestina
1951	Italy	Guido De Santi	Benotto–Ursus
1952	Italy	Giuseppe Minardi	Legnano
1953	Italy	Nino Defilippis	Legnano–Pirelli
1954	Italy	Giorgio Albani	Legnano
1955	Italy	Fausto Coppi	Bianchi–Pirelli
1956	Italy	Gastone Nencini	Leo–Chlorodont
1957	Belgium	Germain Derijcke	Faema–Guerra
1958	Italy	Carlo Nicolo	Molteni
1959	Italy	Dino Bruni	Ignis–Fréjus
1960	Italy	Nino Defilippis	Carpano
1961	Belgium	Willy Vannitsen	Baratti–Milano
1962	Italy	Giuseppe Fezzardi	San Pellegrino Sport
1963	Italy	Italo Zilioli	Carpano
1964	Italy	Marino Vigna	Gazzola
1965	Italy	Gianni Motta	Molteni
1966	Italy	Gianni Motta	Molteni
1967	Italy	Gianni Motta	Molteni
1968	Belgium	Eddy Merckx	Faema
1969	Italy	Marino Basso	Molteni
1970	Italy	Gianni Motta	Salvarani
1971	Italy	Giancarlo Polidori	Scic
1972	Italy	Giacinto Santambrogio	Salvarani
1973	Italy	Enrico Paolini	Scic
1974	Italy	Costantino Conti	Zonca
1975	Italy	Fabrizio Fabbri	Bianchi-Campagnolo
1976	Italy	Francesco Moser	Sanson
1977	Italy	Giuseppe Saronni	Scic
1978	Italy	Francesco Moser	Sanson-Columbus
1979	Italy	Giuseppe Saronni	Scic
1980	Italy	Giuseppe Saronni	Gis Gelati
1981	West Germany	Gregor Braun	Famcucine-Campagnolo
1982	Italy	Pierino Gavazzi	Atala-Campagnolo
1983	Italy	Alessandro Paganessi	Bianchi-Piaggio
1984	Italy	Pierino Gavazzi	Atala-Campagnolo
1985	Italy	Giovanni Mantovani	Supermercati Brianzoli
1986	Italy	Guido Bontempi	Carrera Jeans–Vagabond
1987	Italy	Franco Ballerini	Magniflex-Centroscarpa
1988	Italy	Giuseppe Saronni	Del Tongo-Colnago
1989	Italy	Gianni Bugno	Château d'Ax-Salotti
1990	Switzerland	Pascal Richard	Helvetia–La Suisse
1991	Italy	Guido Bontempi	Carrera Jeans–Tassoni
1992	Italy	Massimo Ghirotto	Carrera Jeans–Vagabond
1993	Italy	Massimo Ghirotto	ZG Mobili
1994	Italy	Claudio Chiappucci	Carrera Jeans–Tassoni
1995	Italy	Roberto Caruso	ZG Mobili-Selle Italia
1996	Italy	Fabrizio Guidi	Scrigno-Blue Storm
1997	Italy	Roberto Caruso	Ros Mary-Minotti Italia-Ideal
1998	Italy	Davide Rebellin	Team Polti
1999	Italy	Sergio Barbero	Mercatone Uno–Bianchi
2000	Italy	Massimo Donati	Vini Caldirola–Sidermec
2001	Italy	Mirko Celestino	Saeco
2002	Italy	Eddy Ratti	Mapei–Quick-Step
2003	Italy	Danilo Di Luca	Saeco
2004	Germany	Fabian Wegmann	Gerolsteiner
2005	Italy	Stefano Garzelli	Liquigas–Bianchi
2006	Italy	Stefano Garzelli	Liquigas
2007	Italy	Christian Murro	Tenax
2008	Italy	Francesco Ginanni	Diquigiovanni–Androni
2009	Italy	Mauro Santambrogio	Lampre–NGC
2010	Ireland	Dan Martin	Garmin–Transitions
2011	Italy	Davide Rebellin	Miche–Guerciotti
2012	Canada	David Veilleux	Team Europcar
2013	Croatia	Kristijan Đurasek	Lampre–Merida
2014	Switzerland	Michael Albasini	Orica–GreenEDGE
2015	Italy	Vincenzo Nibali	Astana
2016	Italy	Sonny Colbrelli	Bardiani–CSF
2017	France	Alexandre Geniez	AG2R La Mondiale
2018	Latvia	Toms Skujiņš	Trek–Segafredo
2019	Slovenia	Primož Roglič	Team Jumbo–Visma
2020	No race due to the COVID-19 pandemic, replaced by Gran Trittico Lombardo		
2021	Italy	Alessandro De Marchi	Israel Start-Up Nation
2022	Slovenia	Tadej Pogačar	UAE Team Emirates
2023	Belgium	Ilan Van Wilder	Soudal–Quick-Step
2024	No race due to cancellation after heavy rainfall		
2025	Slovenia	Tadej Pogačar	UAE Team Emirates XRG
2026	Belgium	Jarno Widar	Lotto–Intermarché

=== Women ===
Year	Country	Rider	Team
2021	Cuba	Arlenis Sierra	A.R. Monex
2022	Italy	Elisa Longo Borghini	Trek–Segafredo
2023	Germany	Liane Lippert	Movistar Team
2024	France	Cédrine Kerbaol	Ceratizit–WNT Pro Cycling
2025	Italy	Elisa Longo Borghini	UAE Team ADQ
2026	Italy	Eleonora Gasparrini	UAE Team ADQ

== Wins per country ==
=== Men ===
Wins	Country
88	Italy
5	Belgium
3	Slovenia
2	Germany; Switzerland
1	Ireland; Canada; Croatia; France; Latvia

=== Women ===
Wins	Country
3	Italy
1	Cuba; France; Germany
