= Roberto Caruso =

Italian cyclist

Personal information
- Full name: Roberto Caruso
- Born: 23 May 1967 (age 59) San Nicandro Garganico, Italy

Cycling career
- Sport: Cycling
- Current team: Retired
- Discipline: Road
- Role: Rider

Professional teams
- 1991: Selle Italia – Magniarredo
- 1992–1995: ZG Mobili
- 1996: Glacial – Selle Italia
- 1997: Ros Mary
- 1998: Riso Scotti
Medal record
Representing Italy
Men's road bicycle racing
World Championships
Silver medal – second place	1990 Utsunomiya	Amateur's Road Race

Roberto Caruso (born 23 May 1967 in San Nicandro Garganico, Foggia Province, in the region of Apulia) was an Italian road racing cyclist. Professional from 1991 to 1998, he won the Trois Vallées Varésines twice.

== Major results ==
1990
4th stage of the Giro delle Regione
2nd in the Giro delle Regione
2nd in the Amateur Road World Championships

1993
Gran Premio di Lugano
3rd stage of the Vuelta al Táchira
3rd in the Giro del Lazio

1995
Trois Vallées Varésines
2nd in the Wincanton Classic

1997
Trois Vallées Varésines
2nd in the Giro della Romagna

== Grand Tours results ==
=== Tour de France ===
- 1998 : abandoned after (10th stage)

=== Giro d'Italia ===
- 1993 : 98th
- 1996 : 66th
- 1997 : 76th
