= Michele Coppolillo =

Italian cyclist

Personal information
- Born: 17 July 1967 (age 59)

Cycling career
- Sport: Cycling
- Current team: Retired
- Discipline: Road
- Role: Rider

Professional teams
- 1991–1995: Italbonifica–Navigare
- 1996–1997: MG Maglificio–Technogym
- 1998: Asics–CGA
- 1999–2000: Mercatone Uno–Bianchi
- 2000: Ceramiche Panaria–Fiordo

Michele Coppolillo (born 17 July 1967) is an Italian racing cyclist. He rode in nine editions of the Giro d'Italia, one Tour de France and two editions of the Vuelta a España.

== Major results ==
1994
2nd Overall Settimana Internazionale di Coppi e Bartali
1995
4th Züri-Metzgete
5th Overall Tirreno–Adriatico
1996
1st Stage 4 Tour Méditerranéen
2nd Overall Critérium International
3rd Trofeo Laigueglia
3rd Tour de Berne
3rd Milan–San Remo
4th Overall Tirreno–Adriatico
1997
1st Trofeo Pantalica
