= Fabio Baldato =

Italian cyclist (born 1968)

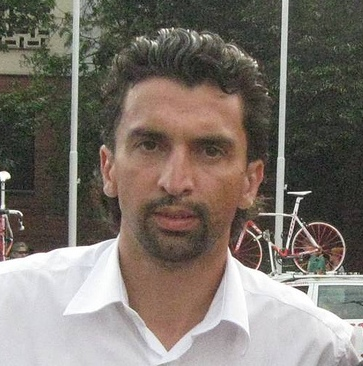

Personal information
- Full name: Fabio Baldato
- Born: 13 June 1968 (age 58) Lonigo, Italy
- Height: 1.80 m (5 ft 11 in)
- Weight: 72 kg (159 lb; 11 st 5 lb)

Cycling career
- Sport: Cycling
- Discipline: Road
- Role: Rider; Director
- Rider type: Sprinter

Professional teams
- 1991: Del Tongo–MG Boys
- 1992–1998: GB–MG Maglificio
- 1999: Ballan–Alessio
- 2000–2002: Fassa Bortolo
- 2003–2004: Alessio
- 2005: Fassa Bortolo
- 2006: Tenax–Salmilano
- 2007–2008: Lampre–Fondital

Managerial team
- 2013–: BMC Racing Team

Major wins
- Grand Tours Tour de France 2 individual stages (1995, 1996) Giro d'Italia 4 individual stages (1993, 2003) Vuelta a España 2 individual stages (1996)

Fabio Baldato (born 13 June 1968) is an Italian former racing cyclist. In 2008, he was the oldest rider in a ProTour team. His cycling career ended when he crashed heavily in the Eneco Tour. He also competed at the 1988 Summer Olympics and the 1996 Summer Olympics.

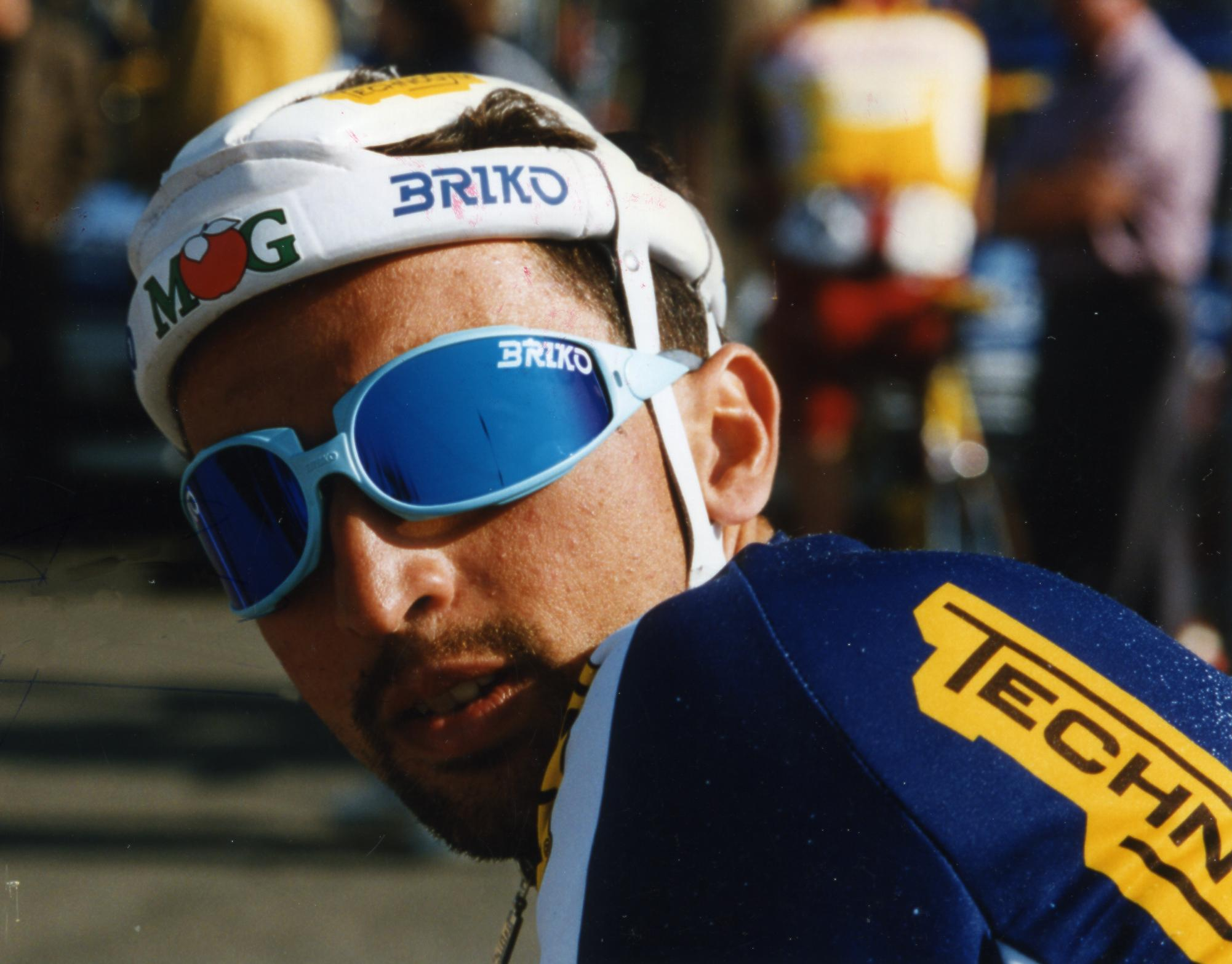
Baldato in 1997

== Major results ==
1986
1st Road race, National Junior Road Championships
1989
6th Gran Premio della Liberazione
1990
1st Trofeo Città di Castelfidardo
1991
6th Trofeo Pantalica
1992
5th Omloop Het Volk
10th Kuurne–Brussels–Kuurne
1993
Giro d'Italia

1st Stages 4, 16 & 21

1st Stage 3a Ronde van Nederland
1st Stage 1 Setmana Catalana de Ciclisme
10th Paris–Tours
1994
Paris–Nice

1st Stages 2 & 4

2nd Paris–Roubaix
6th Tour of Flanders
6th Milan–San Remo
7th E3 Prijs Vlaanderen
1995
Tour de France

1st Stage 1
Held after Stage 1

1st Stage 8a Paris–Nice
1st Stage 1 Volta a la Comunitat Valenciana
1st Stage 2 Tour Méditerranéen
1st Stage 2 Three Days of De Panne
1st Stage 4 Hofbräu Cup
2nd Tour of Flanders
3rd Trofeo Luis Puig
3rd Trofeo Laigueglia
3rd Omloop van de Vlaamse Scheldeboorden
4th Leeds International Classic
5th GP Rik Van Steenbergen
7th Paris–Roubaix
7th Züri-Metzgete
10th Milan–San Remo
1996
1st Coppa Bernocchi
Vuelta a España

1st Stages 6 & 7
Held after Stages 6–9

1st Stage 21 Tour de France
1st Stage 3a Tour de Luxembourg
2nd Overall Tour Méditerranéen
2nd Tour of Flanders
3rd Overall Étoile de Bessèges
3rd Gent–Wevelgem
4th Grand Prix d'Ouverture La Marseillaise
5th Overall Three Days of De Panne
6th Milan–San Remo
7th Road race, Olympic Games
7th Clásica de San Sebastián
8th Züri-Metzgete
1997
2nd Giro dell'Etna
2nd Gran Premio della Costa Etruschi
1998
1st Rund um den Henninger-Turm
1st Stage 2 Tour de Romandie
5th Giro del Veneto
6th Overall Giro di Puglia
6th Classic Haribo
7th GP Rik Van Steenbergen
9th Omloop Het Volk
10th Gent–Wevelgem
10th Züri-Metzgete
1999
1st Stage 2 Danmark Rundt
3rd Paris–Brussels
5th Overall Tour Méditerranéen

1st Stage 6

7th Paris–Tours
7th Trofeo Laigueglia
8th Giro del Friuli
2000
1st Stage 2 Paris–Nice
2nd Milan–San Remo
3rd HEW Cyclassics
6th Criterium d'Abruzzo
2001
1st Stage 5 Tour de Luxembourg
4th Paris–Brussels
8th HEW Cyclassics
2002
1st Trofeo Pantalica
1st Trofeo dell'Etna
1st Stage 3a Three Days of De Panne
1st Stage 2 Giro Riviera Ligure Ponente
1st Stage 1 (TTT) Tour Méditerranéen
6th HEW Cyclassics
2003
1st Overall Étoile de Bessèges

1st Stage 1

1st Stage 2 Giro d'Italia
1st Stage 2 Tour de Pologne
Three Days of De Panne

1st Points classification
1st Stage 2

3rd Trofeo Laigueglia
3rd Giro della Provincia di Reggio Calabria
4th Tour of Flanders
6th Gran Premio Bruno Beghelli
7th HEW Cyclassics
2004
Tour de Pologne

1st Stages 1 & 4

2nd Gran Premio Bruno Beghelli
3rd Grand Prix d'Ouverture La Marseillaise
10th E3 Prijs Vlaanderen
2006
1st Stage 2 Tour of Austria
1st Stage 1 Niedersachsen Rundfahrt
1st Stage 1 (TTT) Tour de Pologne
2007
10th Paris–Roubaix
2008
10th Paris–Roubaix

=== Grand Tour general classification results timeline ===
Grand Tour	1992	1993	1994	1995	1996	1997	1998	1999	2000	2001	2002	2003	2004	2005	2006	2007	2008
Giro d'Italia	—	88	DNF	DNF	—	DNF	DNF	103	DNF	79	—	75	—	130	—	—	109
Tour de France	—	—	—	DNF	63	DNF	DNF	—	—	81	132	DNF	135	—	—	—	—
/ Vuelta a España	DNF	—	—	—	DNF	—	—	—	98	—	DNF	—	—	117	—	—	—

Legend
—	Did not compete
DNF	Did not finish
