= Francesco Frattini =

Italian cyclist

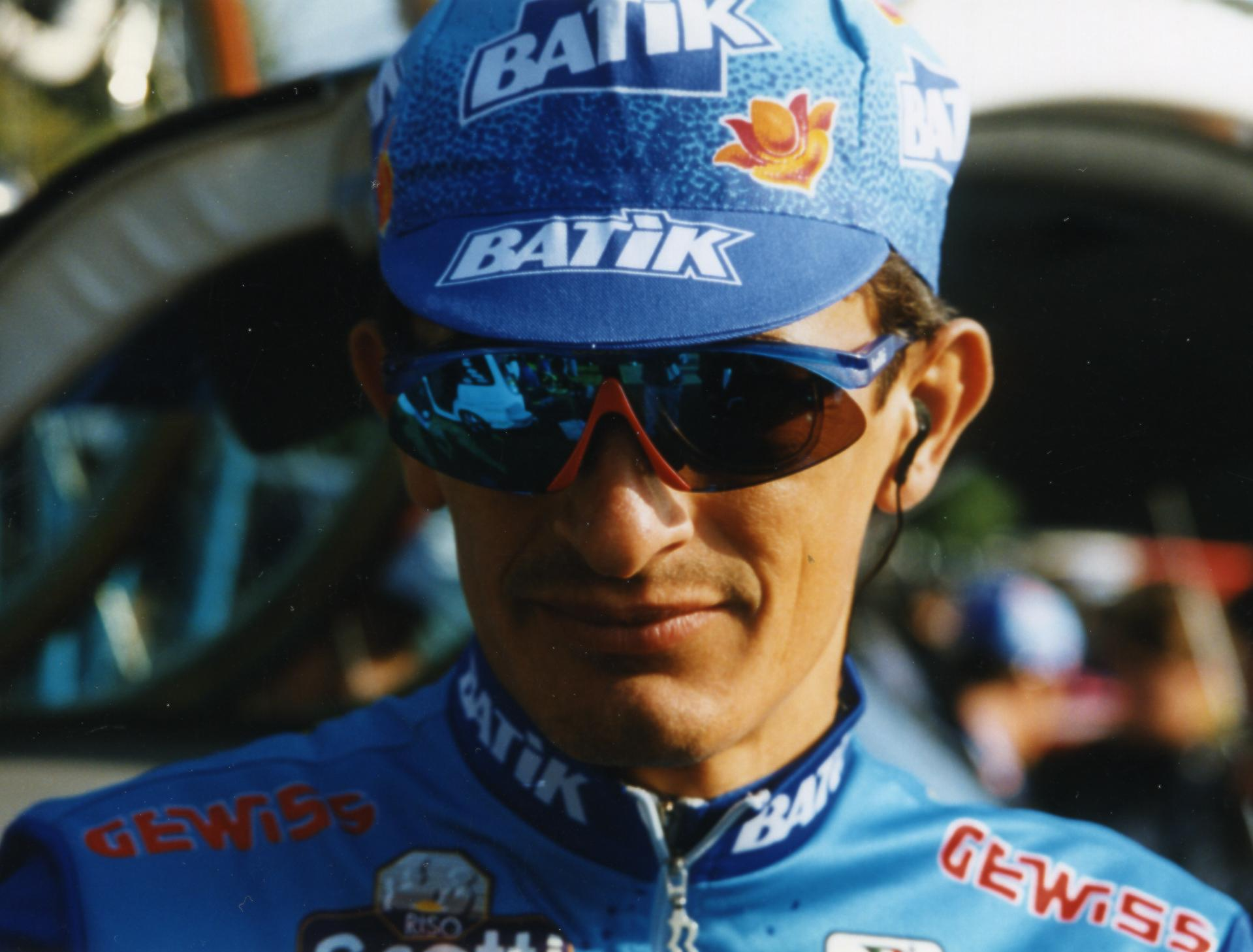

Personal information
- Full name: Francesco Frattini
- Born: 18 January 1967 (age 59) Varese, Italy
- Height: 1.70 m (5 ft 7 in)
- Weight: 60 kg (132 lb; 9 st 6 lb)

Cycling career
- Sport: Cycling
- Discipline: Road
- Role: Rider

Professional teams
- 1993: Mecair-Ballan
- 1994–1995: Gewiss-Ballan
- 1996: Gewiss-Playbus
- 1997: Batik-Del Monte
- 1998–2000: Team Deutsche Telekom

Francesco Frattini (born 18 January 1967, in Varese) is an Italian former road bicycle racer.

== Major results ==
1995
1st, Rund um den Henninger-Turm
1st, Stage 6, Bicicleta Vasca
1st, Setmana Catalana de Ciclisme

1st, Stage 3

1996
1st, Stage 4, Tour of the Basque Country
