= Giro della Liguria =

Annual multi-day road cycling race in Liguria, Italy

Race details
- Date: February
- Region: Liguria
- Discipline: Road
- Type: Stage race

History
- First edition: 2001
- Editions: 4
- Final edition: 2004
- First winner: László Bodrogi (HUN)
- Final winner: Filippo Pozzato (ITA)

The Giro della Liguria was an annual multi-day road cycling race that took place in the region of Liguria, Italy.

The race was founded in 2001 as the Giro Riviera Ligure Ponente, and changed names in 2003. In 2005, it was supposed to be a 2.1 event in the inaugural edition of the UCI Europe Tour, however, the race was cancelled.

== Winners ==
Year	Winner	Second	Third
Giro Riviera Ligure Ponente
2001	(Hungary) László Bodrogi	(Italy) Andrea Ferrigato	(Colombia) Fredy González
2002	(Italy) Paolo Bettini	(Italy) Fabio Sacchi	(Italy) Alberto Ongarato
Giro della Liguria
2003	(Italy) Danilo Di Luca	(Italy) Giuseppe Palumbo	(Italy) Wladimir Belli
2004	(Italy) Filippo Pozzato	(Italy) Crescenzo D'Amore	(United States) Fred Rodriguez
