= Bruno Cenghialta =

Italian cyclist

Personal information
- Full name: Bruno Cenghialta
- Born: 5 December 1962 (age 63) Montecchio Maggiore, Italy
- Height: 1.84 m (6 ft 1/2 in)
- Weight: 73 kg (161 lb; 11 st 7 lb)

Cycling career
- Sport: Cycling
- Current team: Retired
- Discipline: Road
- Role: Rider

Professional teams
- 1986–87: Magniflex
- 1988–1993: Ariostea
- 1994–1996: Gewiss
- 1997: Batik
- 1998: Riso Scotti–MG Maglificio

Managerial teams
- 1999: Amica Chips
- 2000–2004: Alessio
- 2005: Fassa Bortolo
- 2006–2012: Acqua & Sapone
- 2014-: Tinkoff–Saxo

Major wins
- 1 stage 1991 Tour de France

Bruno Cenghialta (born 5 December 1962) is a retired Italian professional road bicycle racer.

Cenghialta was born at Montecchio Maggiore. After his cycling career, Cenghialta became directeur sportif. From 2006 Cenghialta was directeur sportif of Acqua & Sapone–Caffè Mokambo. In 2014 Cenghialta joined Team Tinkoff–Saxo.

== Career achievements ==
=== Major results ===
1988
Schwanenbrau Cup
1991
Tour de France:

Winner stage 14

1994
Coppa Bernocchi

=== Grand Tour general classification results timeline ===
Grand Tour	1990	1991	1992	1993	1994	1995	1996	1997	1998
Giro d'Italia	—	—	—	—	—	11	18	40	57
Tour de France	102	56	DNF	38	25	15	56	112	—
Vuelta a España	—	—	—	—	—	—	—	—	—

Legend
—	Did not compete
DNF	Did not finish

;
