= MG Maglificio (cycling team) =

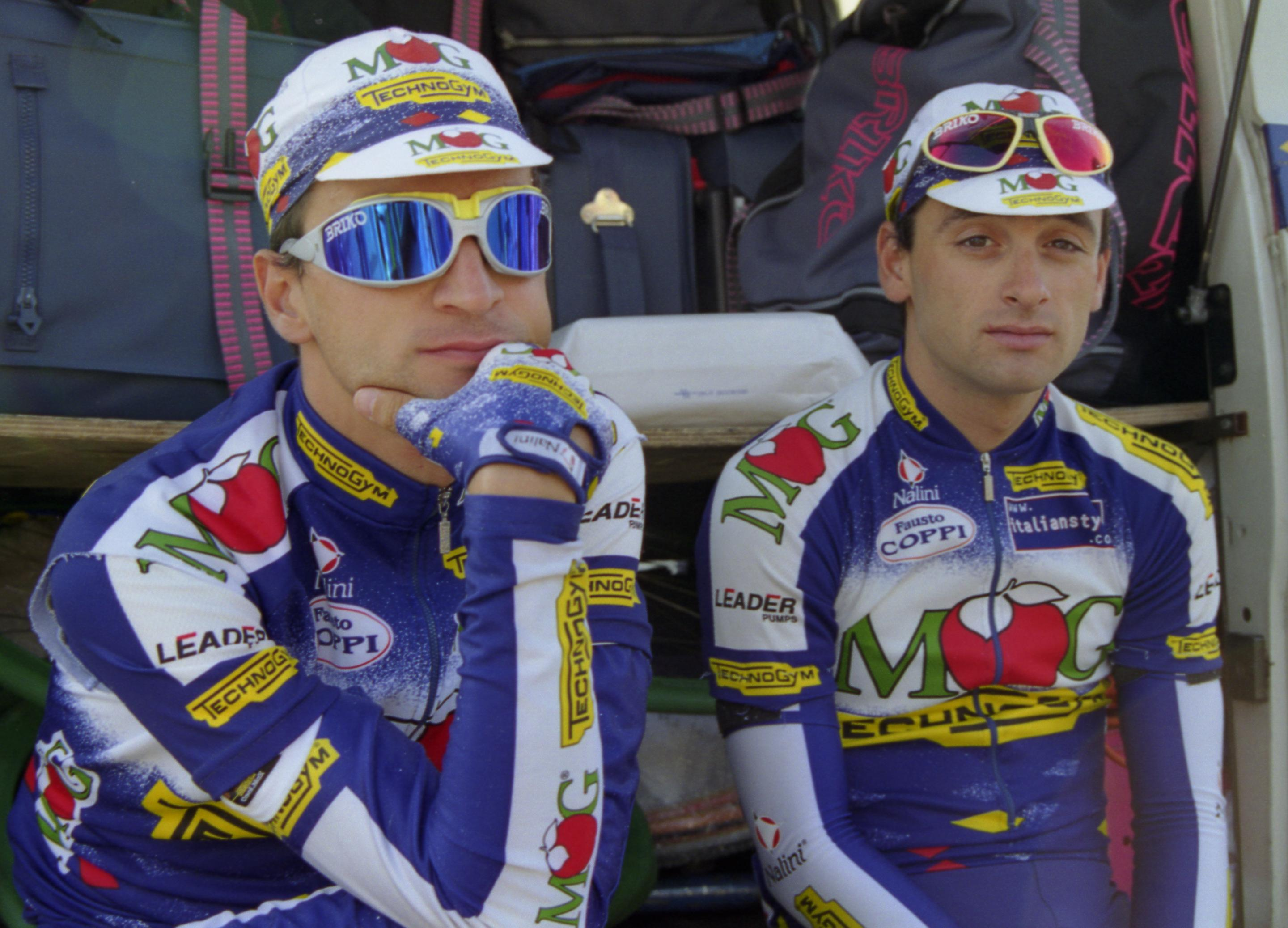
- Michele Bartoli and Paolo Bettini at the 1997 Paris–Tours

Team information
- Registered: Italy
- Founded: 1992
- Disbanded: 1998
- Discipline: Road

Team name history
- 1992–1994 1995–1997 1998: GB–MG Maglificio; MG Maglificio–Technogym; Riso Scotti–MG Maglificio

MG Maglificio was an Italian professional road cycling team in the 1990s. The team started racing in 1992, under the management of Belgians Roger De Vlaeminck and Patrick Lefevere and Italians Enrico Paoloni and Paolo Abetoni. After a one-year co-sponsorship with Riso Scotti in 1998, MG Maglificio withdrew from cycling as a sponsor.

== History ==
=== GB–MG Maglificio ===
MG Maglificio was already a co-sponsor in the 1991 season of the Del Tongo team by Abetoni. This team had riders such as Fabio Baldato, Franco Ballerini, Franco Chioccioli, Dag Erik Pedersen and the young sprinter Mario Cipollini. In 1992, under the guidance of Flemish team management, and with GB and Bianchi as co-sponsors, the team was expanded and included such Belgian talents as Carlo Bomans and Andrej Tchmil, as well as neo-prof Davide Rebellin.

The team was immediately successful, with four Giro stage wins by Mario Cipollini, who was also victorious in Gent–Wevelgem. Chioccioli won a stage in the Tour de France and finished third overall in the Giro.

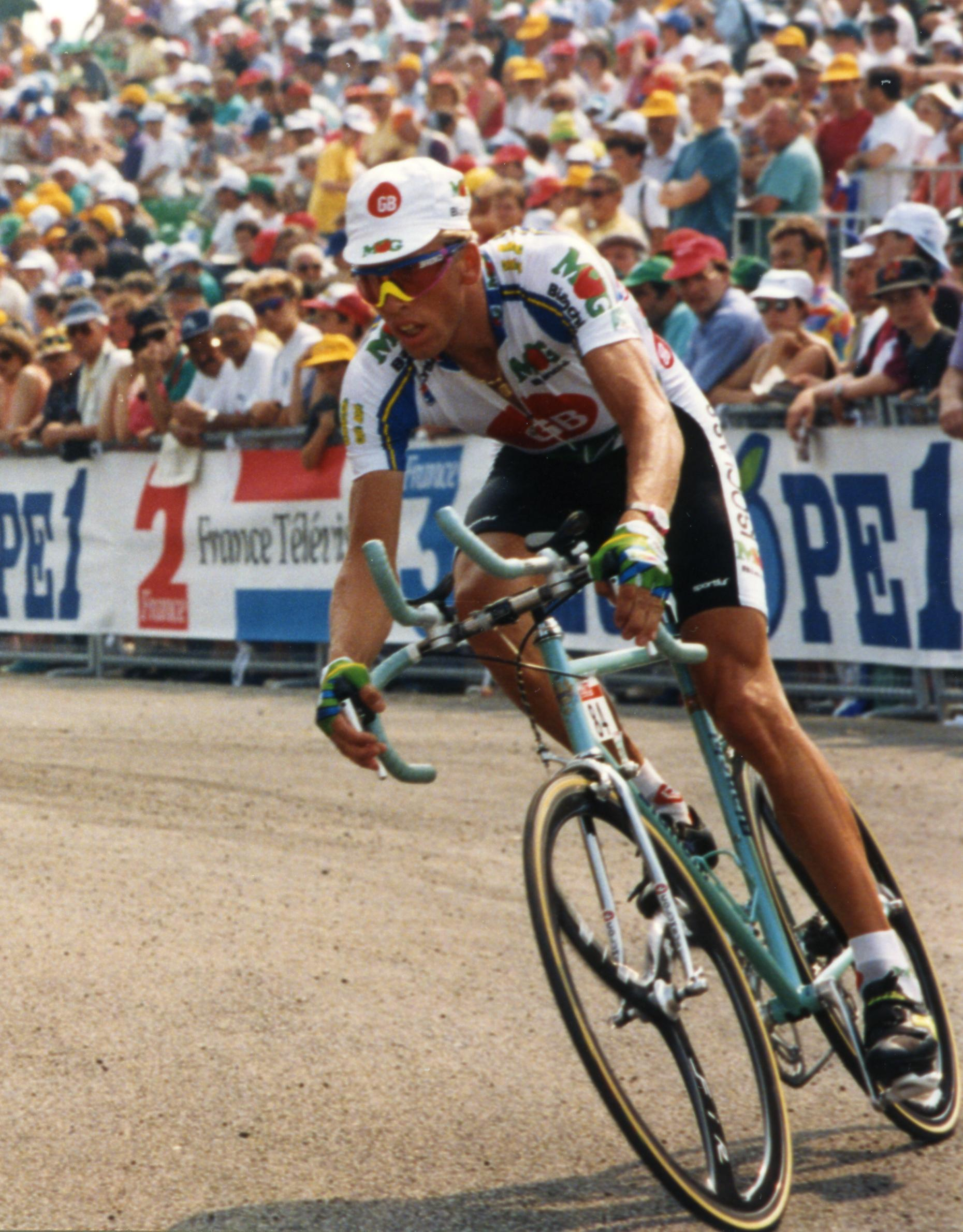
Zenon Jaskuła at the 1993 Tour de France

More Belgians arrived in 1993 with Wilfried Peeters and Johan Museeuw. Baldato won two Giro stages. Polish rider Zenon Jaskuła won a stage 16 and finished 3rd overall in the Tour de France. Mario Cipollini was especially successful in the Flemish spring classics, winning E3 Prijs Vlaanderen and Gent–Wevelgem, among other races. To top that off, Museeuw was victorious at the Tour of Flanders.

The team saw many new riders in 1994 as many old Ariostea riders joined the team, along with its manager, Giancarlo Ferretti. Davide Cassani, Alberto Elli, Rolf Järmann, Pascal Richard and Marco Saligari now joined the ranks of GB-Maglificio-Bianchi. Danish rider Rolf Sørensen and British time trial specialist Max Sciandri also joined the team. Cipollini and Chioccioli left the team however. GB-MG won many one-day races in this year, including the Amstel Gold Race (Museeuw), but also the final classifications of the Swiss stage races Tour de Romandie and Tour de Suisse (Richard). Sørensen was the best at Paris–Brussels, among other races.

=== MG Maglificio–Technogym ===
In 1995, former World Champion Gianni Bugno was signed by the team, now called MG Maglificio–Technogym. Head sponsor GB and manager Patrick Lefevere left the team, taking Johan Museeuw with them to Mapei–GB. Peeters, Bomans and Ludwig Willems joined them, removing the Belgian influence in MG Maglificio, which was now a team with many Italians, a few Swiss and one rider from Denmark and Great Britain each.

Like previous years, Italian specialists like Cassani and Richard won many major one-day races in Italy. Baldato also won a Tour de France stage.

In 1996, Michele Bartoli joined the team from Mercatone Uno. He won the Tour of Flanders and Giro dell'Emillia, among many other races. Baldato was again victorious in the Tour de France with a stage win, but also in the Vuelta a España where he won two stages. Pascal Richard won a special race in Atlanta, where he became Olympic Champion in the road race, where he won in front of former teammates Sorensen and Sciandri, who had left MG-Technogym earlier in 1996.

In 1997, MG signed then 22-year-old Paolo Bettini and Matteo Tosatto, who made their professional debuts. Gilberto Simoni and Mauro-Antonio Santaromita were other new riders at the team in what would be its last under the MG-Technogym name. In this final success year, Bartoli won Liège–Bastogne–Liège and the Coupe du Monde and Alessandro Bertolini won Paris-Brussels.

MG Maglificio remained a sponsor in cycling for one more year, co-financing the Riso Scotti team of Alberto Volpi, with only a few riders from the old MG Maglificio team (among them Baldato). This team wasn't nearly as successful as the old Technogym team, although a young Danilo Di Luca did win the Baby Giro of 1998, after which he scored an internship with Riso Scotti in September.
