= 1996 Tour de France, Stage 11 to Stage 21 =

Cycling race stages

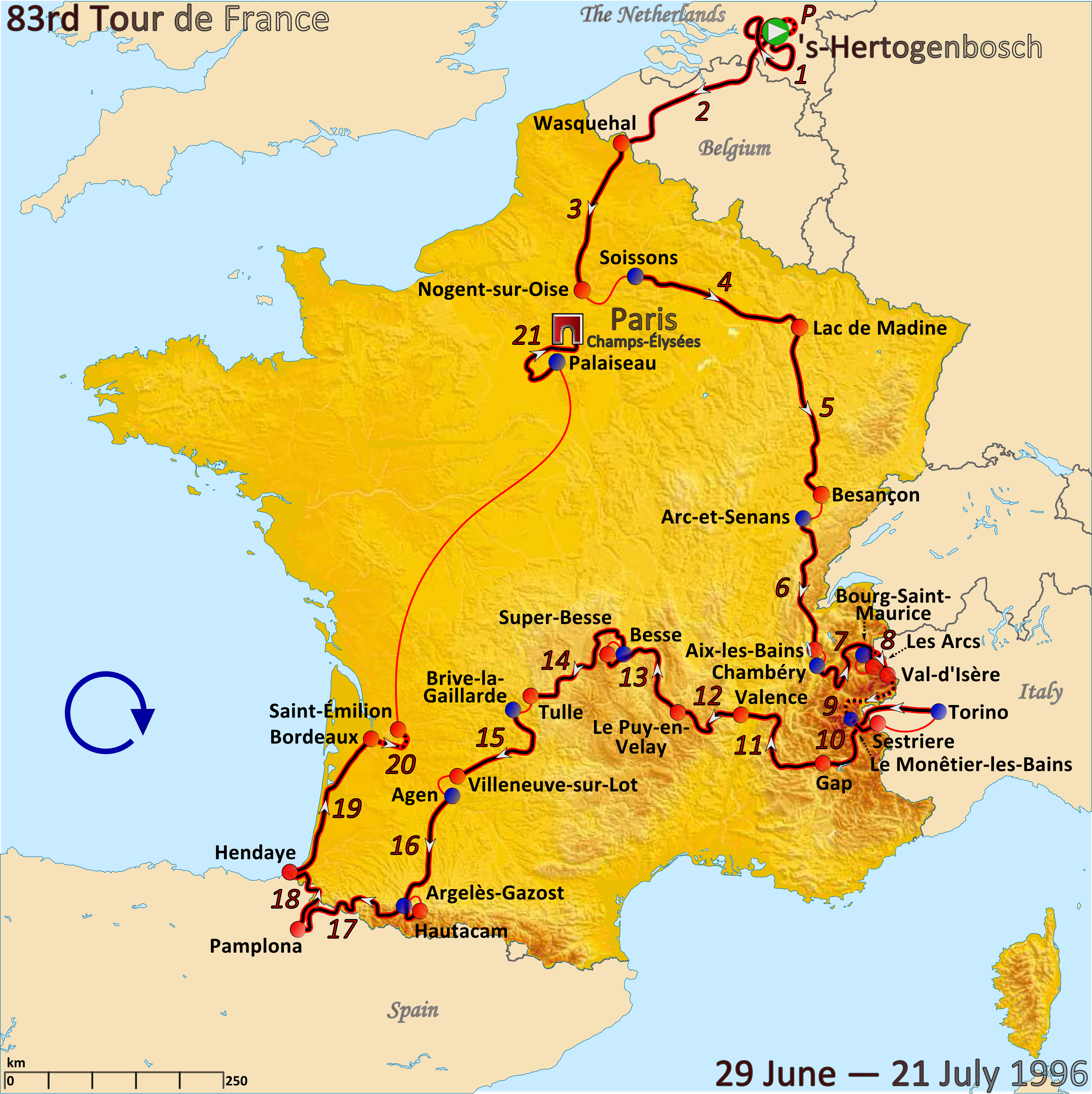
Route of the 1996 Tour de France

The 1996 Tour de France was the 83rd edition of Tour de France, one of cycling's Grand Tours. The Tour began in 's-Hertogenbosch in the Netherlands with a prologue individual time trial on 29 June and Stage 11 occurred on 11 July with a hilly stage from Gap. The race finished on the Champs-Élysées in Paris on 21 July.

== Stage 11 ==
11 July 1996 — Gap to Valence, 202 km (125.5 mi)

Stage 11 result

Rank	Rider	Team	Time
1	José Jaime González (COL)	Kelme–Artiach	5h 09' 12"
2	Manuel Fernández Ginés (ESP)	Mapei–GB	+ 1"
3	Alberto Elli (ITA)	MG Maglificio–Technogym	s.t.
4	Laurent Brochard (FRA)	Festina–Lotus	s.t.
5	Marco Fincato (ITA)	Roslotto–ZG Mobili	s.t.
6	Laurent Roux (FRA)	TVM–Farm Frites	s.t.
7	Stefano Cattai (ITA)	Roslotto–ZG Mobili	+ 5"
8	Laurent Madouas (FRA)	Motorola	s.t.
9	Erik Zabel (GER)	Team Telekom	+ 2' 51"
10	Fabio Baldato (ITA)	MG Maglificio–Technogym	s.t.

General classification after stage 11

Rank	Rider	Team	Time
1	Bjarne Riis (DEN)	Team Telekom	53h 11' 26"
2	Evgeni Berzin (RUS)	Gewiss Playbus	+ 40"
3	Tony Rominger (SUI)	Mapei–GB	+ 53"
4	Abraham Olano (ESP)	Mapei–GB	+ 56"
5	Jan Ullrich (GER)	Team Telekom	+ 1' 38"
6	Peter Luttenberger (AUT)	Carrera Jeans–Tassoni	+ 2' 38"
7	Richard Virenque (FRA)	Festina–Lotus	+ 3' 39"
8	Miguel Induráin (ESP)	Banesto	+ 4' 38"
9	Fernando Escartín (ESP)	Kelme–Artiach	+ 4' 49"
10	Laurent Dufaux (SUI)	Festina–Lotus	+ 5' 03"

== Stage 12 ==
12 July 1996 — Valence to Le Puy-en-Velay, 143.5 km (89.2 mi)

Stage 12 result

Rank	Rider	Team	Time
1	Pascal Richard (SUI)	MG Maglificio–Technogym	3h 29' 19"
2	Jesper Skibby (DEN)	TVM–Farm Frites	s.t.
3	Mirco Gualdi (ITA)	Team Polti	s.t.
4	Danny Nelissen (NED)	Rabobank	s.t.
5	Félix García Casas (ESP)	Festina–Lotus	+ 3"
6	Flavio Vanzella (ITA)	Motorola	s.t.
7	Erik Breukink (NED)	Rabobank	s.t.
8	Melcior Mauri (ESP)	ONCE	s.t.
9	Laurent Roux (FRA)	TVM–Farm Frites	+ 12"
10	Erik Zabel (GER)	Team Telekom	+ 15' 14"

General classification after stage 12

Rank	Rider	Team	Time
1	Bjarne Riis (DEN)	Team Telekom	56h 55' 59"
2	Evgeni Berzin (RUS)	Gewiss Playbus	+ 40"
3	Tony Rominger (SUI)	Mapei–GB	+ 53"
4	Abraham Olano (ESP)	Mapei–GB	+ 56"
5	Jan Ullrich (GER)	Team Telekom	+ 1' 38"
6	Peter Luttenberger (AUT)	Carrera Jeans–Tassoni	+ 2' 38"
7	Richard Virenque (FRA)	Festina–Lotus	+ 3' 39"
8	Miguel Induráin (ESP)	Banesto	+ 4' 38"
9	Fernando Escartín (ESP)	Kelme–Artiach	+ 4' 49"
10	Laurent Dufaux (SUI)	Festina–Lotus	+ 5' 03"

== Stage 13 ==
13 July 1996 — Le Puy-en-Velay to Super Besse, 177 km (110.0 mi)

Stage 13 result

Rank	Rider	Team	Time
1	Rolf Sørensen (DEN)	Rabobank	4h 03' 56"
2	Orlando Rodrigues (POR)	Banesto	s.t.
3	Richard Virenque (FRA)	Festina–Lotus	s.t.
4	Luc Leblanc (FRA)	Team Polti	+ 2"
5	Paolo Savoldelli (ITA)	Roslotto–ZG Mobili	+ 11"
6	Miguel Induráin (ESP)	Banesto	+ 23"
7	Chris Boardman (GBR)	GAN	s.t.
8	Laurent Brochard (FRA)	Festina–Lotus	s.t.
9	Laurent Dufaux (SUI)	Festina–Lotus	s.t.
10	Abraham Olano (ESP)	Mapei–GB	s.t.

General classification after stage 13

Rank	Rider	Team	Time
1	Bjarne Riis (DEN)	Team Telekom	61h 00' 18"
2	Abraham Olano (ESP)	Mapei–GB	+ 56"
3	Evgeni Berzin (RUS)	Gewiss Playbus	+ 1' 08"
4	Tony Rominger (SUI)	Mapei–GB	+ 1' 21"
5	Jan Ullrich (GER)	Team Telekom	+ 2' 06"
6	Peter Luttenberger (AUT)	Carrera Jeans–Tassoni	+ 2' 38"
7	Richard Virenque (FRA)	Festina–Lotus	+ 3' 16"
8	Miguel Induráin (ESP)	Banesto	+ 4' 38"
9	Laurent Dufaux (SUI)	Festina–Lotus	+ 5' 03"
10	Fernando Escartín (ESP)	Kelme–Artiach	+ 5' 17"

== Stage 14 ==
14 July 1996 — Besse to Tulle, 186.5 km (115.9 mi)

Stage 14 result

Rank	Rider	Team	Time
1	Djamolidine Abdoujaparov (UZB)	Refin–Mobilvetta	4h 06' 29"
2	Mirco Gualdi (ITA)	Team Polti	+ 7"
3	Laurent Madouas (FRA)	Motorola	+ 9"
4	Didier Rous (FRA)	GAN	+ 16"
5	Bo Hamburger (DEN)	TVM–Farm Frites	+ 31"
6	Thierry Bourguignon (FRA)	Aubervilliers 93	+ 3' 56"
7	Rolf Järmann (SUI)	MG Maglificio–Technogym	+ 4' 12"
8	Bruno Boscardin (ITA)	Festina–Lotus	s.t.
9	Andrea Tafi (ITA)	Mapei–GB	+ 4' 15"
10	Stefano Cattai (ITA)	Roslotto–ZG Mobili	+ 4' 17"

General classification after stage 14

Rank	Rider	Team	Time
1	Bjarne Riis (DEN)	Team Telekom	65h 11' 40"
2	Abraham Olano (ESP)	Mapei–GB	+ 56"
3	Evgeni Berzin (RUS)	Gewiss Playbus	+ 1' 08"
4	Tony Rominger (SUI)	Mapei–GB	+ 1' 21"
5	Jan Ullrich (GER)	Team Telekom	+ 2' 06"
6	Peter Luttenberger (AUT)	Carrera Jeans–Tassoni	+ 2' 38"
7	Richard Virenque (FRA)	Festina–Lotus	+ 3' 16"
8	Miguel Induráin (ESP)	Banesto	+ 4' 38"
9	Laurent Dufaux (SUI)	Festina–Lotus	+ 5' 03"
10	Fernando Escartín (ESP)	Kelme–Artiach	+ 5' 17"

== Stage 15 ==
15 July 1996 — Brive-la-Gaillarde to Villeneuve-sur-Lot, 176 km (109 mi)

Stage 15 result

Rank	Rider	Team	Time
1	Massimo Podenzana (ITA)	Carrera Jeans–Tassoni	3h 54' 52"
2	Giuseppe Guerini (ITA)	Team Polti	+ 37"
3	Peter Van Petegem (BEL)	TVM–Farm Frites	+ 50"
4	Michele Bartoli (ITA)	MG Maglificio–Technogym	s.t.
5	François Lemarchand (FRA)	GAN	+ 1' 16"
6	Neil Stephens (AUS)	ONCE	+ 1' 41"
7	Frédéric Moncassin (FRA)	GAN	+ 5' 38"
8	Fabio Baldato (FRA)	MG Maglificio–Technogym	s.t.
9	Erik Zabel (GER)	Team Telekom	s.t.
10	Andrea Ferrigato (ITA)	Roslotto–ZG Mobili	s.t.

General classification after stage 15

Rank	Rider	Team	Time
1	Bjarne Riis (DEN)	Team Telekom	69h 12' 10"
2	Abraham Olano (ESP)	Mapei–GB	+ 56"
3	Evgeni Berzin (RUS)	Gewiss Playbus	+ 1' 08"
4	Tony Rominger (SUI)	Mapei–GB	+ 1' 21"
5	Jan Ullrich (GER)	Team Telekom	+ 2' 06"
6	Peter Luttenberger (AUT)	Carrera Jeans–Tassoni	+ 2' 38"
7	Richard Virenque (FRA)	Festina–Lotus	+ 3' 16"
8	Miguel Induráin (ESP)	Banesto	+ 4' 38"
9	Laurent Dufaux (SUI)	Festina–Lotus	+ 5' 03"
10	Fernando Escartín (ESP)	Kelme–Artiach	+ 5' 17"

== Stage 16 ==
16 July 1996 — Agen to Hautacam, 199 km (124 mi)

Stage 16 result

Rank	Rider	Team	Time
1	Bjarne Riis (DEN)	Team Telekom	4h 56' 16"
2	Richard Virenque (FRA)	Festina–Lotus	+ 49"
3	Laurent Dufaux (SUI)	Festina–Lotus	s.t.
4	Luc Leblanc (FRA)	Team Polti	+ 54"
5	Leonardo Piepoli (ITA)	Refin–Mobilvetta	+ 57"
6	Tony Rominger (SUI)	Mapei–GB	+ 1' 33"
7	Jan Ullrich (GER)	Team Telekom	s.t.
8	Piotr Ugrumov (LAT)	Roslotto–ZG Mobili	s.t.
9	Laurent Brochard (FRA)	Festina–Lotus	+ 1' 41"
10	Fernando Escartín (ESP)	Kelme–Artiach	+ 1' 46"

General classification after stage 16

Rank	Rider	Team	Time
1	Bjarne Riis (DEN)	Team Telekom	74h 08' 26"
2	Abraham Olano (ESP)	Mapei–GB	+ 2' 42"
3	Tony Rominger (SUI)	Mapei–GB	+ 2' 54"
4	Jan Ullrich (GER)	Team Telekom	+ 3' 39"
5	Richard Virenque (FRA)	Festina–Lotus	+ 4' 05"
6	Evgeni Berzin (RUS)	Gewiss Playbus	+ 4' 07"
7	Laurent Dufaux (SUI)	Festina–Lotus	+ 5' 52"
8	Peter Luttenberger (AUT)	Carrera Jeans–Tassoni	+ 5' 59"
9	Fernando Escartín (ESP)	Kelme–Artiach	+ 7' 03"
10	Miguel Induráin (ESP)	Banesto	+ 7' 06"

== Stage 17 ==
17 July 1996 — Argelès-Gazost to Pamplona (Spain), 262 km (163 mi)

Stage 17 result

Rank	Rider	Team	Time
1	Laurent Dufaux (SUI)	Festina–Lotus	7h 07' 08"
2	Bjarne Riis (DEN)	Team Telekom	s.t.
3	Richard Virenque (FRA)	Festina–Lotus	+ 20"
4	Jan Ullrich (GER)	Team Telekom	s.t.
5	Luc Leblanc (FRA)	Team Polti	s.t.
6	Piotr Ugrumov (LAT)	Roslotto–ZG Mobili	s.t.
7	Fernando Escartín (ESP)	Kelme–Artiach	s.t.
8	Peter Luttenberger (AUT)	Carrera Jeans–Tassoni	s.t.
9	Massimiliano Lelli (ITA)	Saeco–AS Juvenes San Marino	+ 8' 28"
10	Paolo Savoldelli (ITA)	Roslotto–ZG Mobili	s.t.

General classification after stage 17

Rank	Rider	Team	Time
1	Bjarne Riis (DEN)	Team Telekom	81h 15' 34"
2	Jan Ullrich (GER)	Team Telekom	+ 3' 59"
3	Richard Virenque (FRA)	Festina–Lotus	+ 4' 25"
4	Laurent Dufaux (SUI)	Festina–Lotus	+ 5' 52"
5	Peter Luttenberger (AUT)	Carrera Jeans–Tassoni	+ 6' 19"
6	Fernando Escartín (ESP)	Kelme–Artiach	+ 7' 23"
7	Piotr Ugrumov (LAT)	Roslotto–ZG Mobili	+ 7' 48"
8	Luc Leblanc (FRA)	Team Polti	+ 8' 01"
9	Abraham Olano (ESP)	Mapei–GB	+ 11' 12"
10	Tony Rominger (SUI)	Mapei–GB	+ 11' 24"

== Stage 18 ==
18 July 1996 — Pamplona (Spain) to Hendaye, 154.5 km (96.0 mi)

Stage 18 result

Rank	Rider	Team	Time
1	Bart Voskamp (NED)	TVM–Farm Frites	4h 11' 02"
2	Christian Henn (GER)	Team Telekom	+ 2"
3	Alberto Elli (ITA)	MG Maglificio–Technogym	+ 27"
4	Bruno Thibout (FRA)	Motorola	s.t.
5	Bruno Boscardin (ITA)	Festina–Lotus	+ 32"
6	Andrea Ferrigato (ITA)	Roslotto–ZG Mobili	+ 1' 26"
7	Pascal Hervé (FRA)	Festina–Lotus	s.t.
8	Erik Breukink (NED)	Rabobank	s.t.
9	Valentino Fois (ITA)	Panaria–Vinavil	s.t.
10	Davide Perona (ITA)	Gewiss Playbus	s.t.

General classification after stage 18

Rank	Rider	Team	Time
1	Bjarne Riis (DEN)	Team Telekom	85h 43' 32"
2	Jan Ullrich (GER)	Team Telekom	+ 3' 59"
3	Richard Virenque (FRA)	Festina–Lotus	+ 4' 25"
4	Laurent Dufaux (SUI)	Festina–Lotus	+ 5' 52"
5	Peter Luttenberger (AUT)	Carrera Jeans–Tassoni	+ 6' 19"
6	Fernando Escartín (ESP)	Kelme–Artiach	+ 7' 23"
7	Piotr Ugrumov (LAT)	Roslotto–ZG Mobili	+ 7' 48"
8	Luc Leblanc (FRA)	Team Polti	+ 8' 01"
9	Abraham Olano (ESP)	Mapei–GB	+ 11' 12"
10	Tony Rominger (SUI)	Mapei–GB	+ 11' 24"

== Stage 19 ==
19 July 1996 — Hendaye to Bordeaux, 226.5 km (140.7 mi)

Stage 19 result

Rank	Rider	Team	Time
1	Frédéric Moncassin (FRA)	GAN	5h 25' 11"
2	Erik Zabel (GER)	Team Telekom	s.t.
3	Fabio Baldato (ITA)	MG Maglificio–Technogym	s.t.
4	Djamolidine Abdoujaparov (UZB)	Refin–Mobilvetta	s.t.
5	Mariano Piccoli (ITA)	Brescialat	s.t.
6	Simone Biasci (ITA)	Saeco–AS Juvenes San Marino	s.t.
7	Ivan Cerioli (ITA)	Gewiss Playbus	s.t.
8	Andrei Tchmil (RUS)	Lotto	s.t.
9	Andrea Ferrigato (ITA)	Roslotto–ZG Mobili	s.t.
10	Thierry Gouvenou (FRA)	Aubervilliers 93	s.t.

General classification after stage 19

Rank	Rider	Team	Time
1	Bjarne Riis (DEN)	Team Telekom	91h 08' 43"
2	Jan Ullrich (GER)	Team Telekom	+ 3' 59"
3	Richard Virenque (FRA)	Festina–Lotus	+ 4' 25"
4	Laurent Dufaux (SUI)	Festina–Lotus	+ 5' 52"
5	Peter Luttenberger (AUT)	Carrera Jeans–Tassoni	+ 6' 19"
6	Fernando Escartín (ESP)	Kelme–Artiach	+ 7' 23"
7	Piotr Ugrumov (LAT)	Roslotto–ZG Mobili	+ 7' 48"
8	Luc Leblanc (FRA)	Team Polti	+ 8' 01"
9	Abraham Olano (ESP)	Mapei–GB	+ 11' 12"
10	Tony Rominger (SUI)	Mapei–GB	+ 11' 24"

== Stage 20 ==
20 July 1996 — Bordeaux to Saint-Émilion, 63.5 km (39.5 mi) (ITT)

Stage 20 result

Rank	Rider	Team	Time
1	Jan Ullrich (GER)	Team Telekom	1h 15' 31"
2	Miguel Induráin (ESP)	Banesto	+ 56"
3	Abraham Olano (ESP)	Mapei–GB	+ 2' 06"
4	Bjarne Riis (DEN)	Team Telekom	+ 2' 18"
5	Laurent Dufaux (SUI)	Festina–Lotus	+ 2' 19"
6	Chris Boardman (GBR)	GAN	+ 2' 29"
7	Richard Virenque (FRA)	Festina–Lotus	+ 2' 30"
8	Tony Rominger (SUI)	Mapei–GB	+ 2' 47"
9	Evgeni Berzin (RUS)	Gewiss Playbus	+ 2' 56"
10	Laurent Brochard (FRA)	Festina–Lotus	+ 2' 57"

General classification after stage 20

Rank	Rider	Team	Time
1	Bjarne Riis (DEN)	Team Telekom	92h 26' 32"
2	Jan Ullrich (GER)	Team Telekom	+ 1' 41"
3	Richard Virenque (FRA)	Festina–Lotus	+ 4' 37"
4	Laurent Dufaux (SUI)	Festina–Lotus	+ 5' 53"
5	Peter Luttenberger (AUT)	Carrera Jeans–Tassoni	+ 7' 07"
6	Luc Leblanc (FRA)	Team Polti	+ 10' 03"
7	Piotr Ugrumov (LAT)	Roslotto–ZG Mobili	+ 10' 04"
8	Fernando Escartín (ESP)	Kelme–Artiach	+ 10' 26"
9	Abraham Olano (ESP)	Mapei–GB	+ 11' 00"
10	Tony Rominger (SUI)	Mapei–GB	+ 11' 53"

== Stage 21 ==
21 July 1996 — Palaiseau to Paris Champs-Élysées, 147.5 km (91.7 mi)

Stage 21 result

Rank	Rider	Team	Time
1	Fabio Baldato (ITA)	MG Maglificio–Technogym	3h 30' 44"
2	Frédéric Moncassin (FRA)	GAN	s.t.
3	Jeroen Blijlevens (NED)	TVM–Farm Frites	s.t.
4	Djamolidine Abdoujaparov (UZB)	Refin–Mobilvetta	s.t.
5	Erik Zabel (GER)	Team Telekom	s.t.
6	Rolf Sørensen (DEN)	Rabobank	s.t.
7	Andrei Tchmil (RUS)	Lotto	s.t.
8	Mariano Piccoli (ITA)	Brescialat	s.t.
9	Danny Nelissen (NED)	Rabobank	s.t.
10	Frankie Andreu (USA)	Motorola	s.t.

General classification after stage 21

Rank	Rider	Team	Time
1	Bjarne Riis (DEN)	Team Telekom	95h 57' 16"
2	Jan Ullrich (GER)	Team Telekom	+ 1' 41"
3	Richard Virenque (FRA)	Festina–Lotus	+ 4' 37"
4	Laurent Dufaux (SUI)	Festina–Lotus	+ 5' 53"
5	Peter Luttenberger (AUT)	Carrera Jeans–Tassoni	+ 7' 07"
6	Luc Leblanc (FRA)	Team Polti	+ 10' 03"
7	Piotr Ugrumov (LAT)	Roslotto–ZG Mobili	+ 10' 04"
8	Fernando Escartín (ESP)	Kelme–Artiach	+ 10' 26"
9	Abraham Olano (ESP)	Mapei–GB	+ 11' 00"
10	Tony Rominger (SUI)	Mapei–GB	+ 11' 53"
