= 1996 Tour de France, Prologue to Stage 10 =

Stages of cycle race

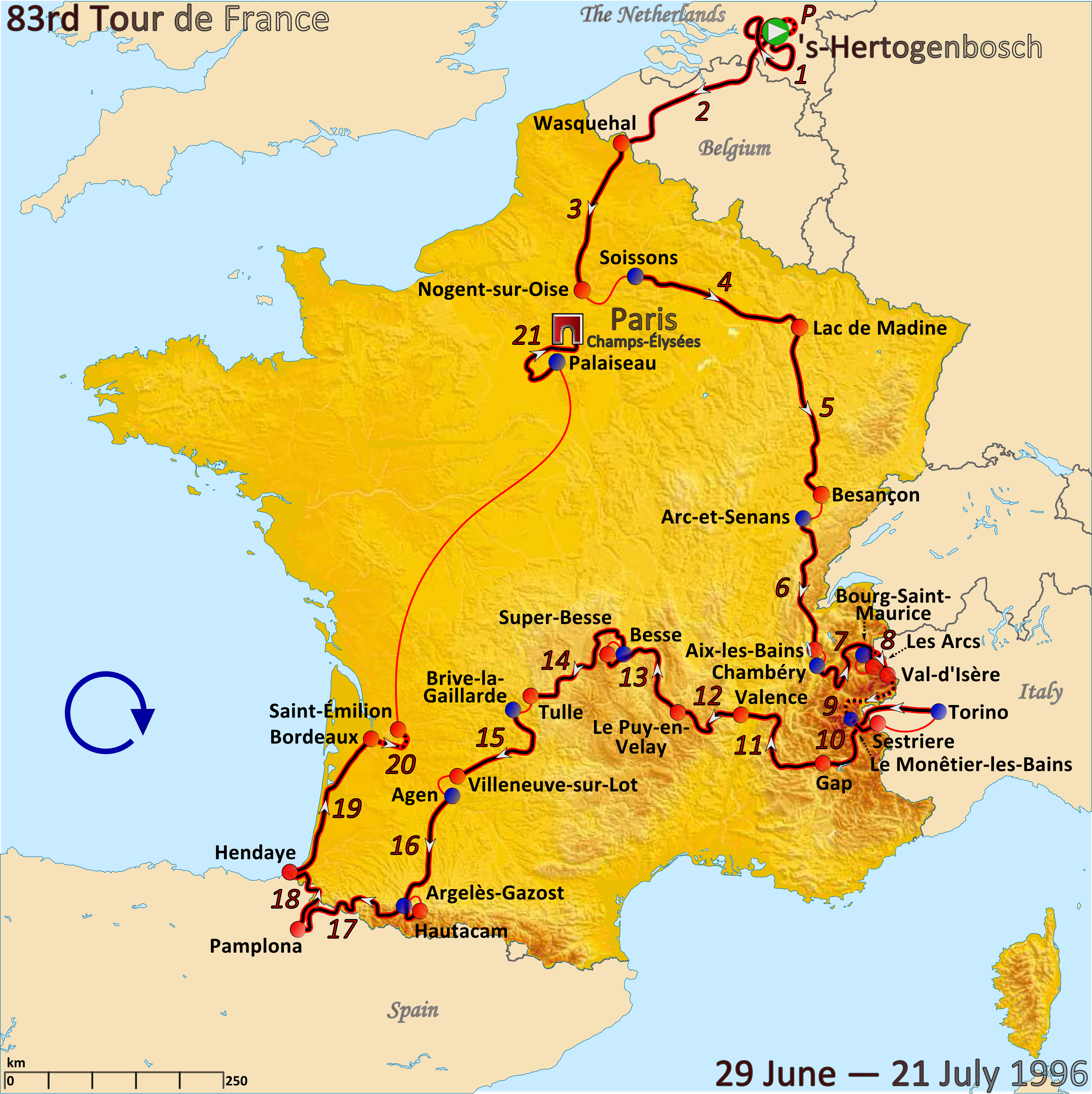
Route of the 1996 Tour de France

The 1996 Tour de France was the 83rd edition of Tour de France, one of cycling's Grand Tours. The Tour began in 's-Hertogenbosch in the Netherlands with a prologue individual time trial on 29 June and Stage 10 occurred on 9 July with a hilly stage to Gap. The race finished on the Champs-Élysées in Paris on 21 July.

== Prologue ==
29 June 1996 — 's-Hertogenbosch (Netherlands), 9.4 km (5.8 mi) (ITT)

Prologue result and general classification after prologue

Rank	Rider	Team	Time
1	Alex Zülle (SUI)	ONCE	10' 53"
2	Chris Boardman (GBR)	GAN	+ 2"
3	Evgeni Berzin (RUS)	Gewiss Playbus	+ 3"
4	Abraham Olano (ESP)	Mapei–GB	+ 7"
5	Tony Rominger (SUI)	Mapei–GB	+ 10"
6	Bjarne Riis (DEN)	Team Telekom	+ 11"
7	Miguel Induráin (ESP)	Banesto	+ 12"
8	Laurent Jalabert (FRA)	ONCE	+ 15"
9	Melcior Mauri (ESP)	ONCE	+ 21"
10	Alexander Gontchenkov (RUS)	Roslotto–ZG Mobili	+ 22"

== Stage 1 ==
30 June 1996 — 's-Hertogenbosch (Netherlands), 209 km (129.9 mi)

Stage 1 result

Rank	Rider	Team	Time
1	Frédéric Moncassin (FRA)	GAN	5h 00' 01"
2	Jeroen Blijlevens (NED)	TVM–Farm Frites	s.t.
3	Ján Svorada (CZE)	Panaria–Vinavil	s.t.
4	Nicola Minali (ITA)	Gewiss Playbus	s.t.
5	Erik Zabel (GER)	Team Telekom	s.t.
6	Fabio Baldato (ITA)	Mapei–GB–Latexco	s.t.
7	Arvis Piziks (LAT)	Rabobank	s.t.
8	Stefano Colagè (ITA)	Refin–Mobilvetta	s.t.
9	Christophe Capelle (FRA)	Aubervilliers 93	s.t.
10	Mario Traversoni (ITA)	Carrera Jeans–Tassoni	s.t.

General classification after stage 1

Rank	Rider	Team	Time
1	Alex Zülle (SUI)	ONCE	5h 10' 54"
2	Evgeni Berzin (RUS)	Gewiss Playbus	+ 3"
3	Abraham Olano (ESP)	Mapei–GB	+ 7"
4	Frédéric Moncassin (FRA)	GAN	+ 9"
5	Bjarne Riis (DEN)	Team Telekom	+ 11"
6	Miguel Induráin (ESP)	Banesto	+ 12"
7	Laurent Jalabert (FRA)	ONCE	+ 15"
8	Chris Boardman (GBR)	GAN	+ 17"
9	Tony Rominger (SUI)	Mapei–GB	+ 19"
10	Melcior Mauri (ESP)	ONCE	+ 21"

== Stage 2 ==
1 July 1996 — 's-Hertogenbosch (Netherlands) to Wasquehal, 247.5 km (153.8 mi)

Stage 2 result

Rank	Rider	Team	Time
1	Mario Cipollini (ITA)	Saeco–AS Juvenes San Marino	6h 29' 22"
2	Jeroen Blijlevens (NED)	TVM–Farm Frites	s.t.
3	Ján Svorada (CZE)	Panaria–Vinavil	s.t.
4	Frédéric Moncassin (FRA)	GAN	s.t.
5	Christophe Capelle (FRA)	Aubervilliers 93	s.t.
6	Erik Zabel (GER)	Team Telekom	s.t.
7	Mario Traversoni (ITA)	Carrera Jeans–Tassoni	s.t.
8	Andrea Ferrigato (ITA)	Roslotto–ZG Mobili	s.t.
9	Claudio Camin (ITA)	Brescialat	s.t.
10	Kaspars Ozers (LAT)	Motorola	s.t.

General classification after stage 2

Rank	Rider	Team	Time
1	Alex Zülle (SUI)	ONCE	11h 40' 16"
2	Frédéric Moncassin (FRA)	GAN	+ 1"
3	Evgeni Berzin (RUS)	Gewiss Playbus	+ 3"
4	Abraham Olano (ESP)	Mapei–GB	+ 7"
5	Bjarne Riis (DEN)	Team Telekom	+ 11"
6	Miguel Induráin (ESP)	Banesto	+ 12"
7	Laurent Jalabert (FRA)	ONCE	+ 15"
8	Chris Boardman (GBR)	GAN	+ 17"
9	Tony Rominger (SUI)	Mapei–GB	+ 19"
10	Melcior Mauri (ESP)	ONCE	+ 21"

== Stage 3 ==
2 July 1996 — Wasquehal to Nogent-sur-Oise, 195 km (121 mi)

Stage 3 result

Rank	Rider	Team	Time
1	Erik Zabel (GER)	Team Telekom	5h 29' 21"
2	Mario Cipollini (ITA)	Saeco–AS Juvenes San Marino	s.t.
3	Frédéric Moncassin (FRA)	GAN	s.t.
4	Ján Svorada (CZE)	Panaria–Vinavil	s.t.
5	Jeroen Blijlevens (NED)	TVM–Farm Frites	s.t.
6	Fabio Baldato (ITA)	MG Maglificio–Technogym	s.t.
7	Christophe Capelle (FRA)	Aubervilliers 93	s.t.
8	Nicola Minali (ITA)	Gewiss Playbus	s.t.
9	Claudio Camin (ITA)	Brescialat	s.t.
10	Mario Traversoni (ITA)	Carrera Jeans–Tassoni	s.t.

General classification after stage 3

Rank	Rider	Team	Time
1	Frédéric Moncassin (FRA)	GAN	17h 09' 30"
2	Alex Zülle (SUI)	ONCE	+ 7"
3	Evgeni Berzin (RUS)	Gewiss Playbus	+ 10"
4	Abraham Olano (ESP)	Mapei–GB	+ 14"
5	Bjarne Riis (DEN)	Team Telekom	+ 18"
6	Miguel Induráin (ESP)	Banesto	+ 19"
7	Laurent Jalabert (FRA)	ONCE	+ 22"
8	Chris Boardman (GBR)	GAN	+ 24"
9	Tony Rominger (SUI)	Mapei–GB	+ 26"
10	Melcior Mauri (ESP)	ONCE	+ 28"

== Stage 4 ==
3 July 1996 — Soissons to Lac de Madine, 232 km (144 mi)

Stage 4 result

Rank	Rider	Team	Time
1	Cyril Saugrain (FRA)	Aubervilliers 93	5h 43' 50"
2	Danny Nelissen (NED)	Rabobank	s.t.
3	Rolf Järmann (SUI)	MG Maglificio–Technogym	s.t.
4	Stéphane Heulot (FRA)	GAN	s.t.
5	Mariano Piccoli (ITA)	Brescialat	s.t.
6	Claudio Camin (ITA)	Brescialat	+ 4' 33"
7	Emmanuel Magnien (FRA)	Festina–Lotus	s.t.
8	Djamolidine Abdoujaparov (UZB)	Refin–Mobilvetta	s.t.
9	Arvis Piziks (LAT)	Rabobank	s.t.
10	Fabio Baldato (ITA)	MG Maglificio–Technogym	s.t.

General classification after stage 4

Rank	Rider	Team	Time
1	Stéphane Heulot (FRA)	GAN	22h 53' 20"
2	Mariano Piccoli (ITA)	Brescialat	+ 22"
3	Cyril Saugrain (FRA)	Aubervilliers 93	+ 34"
4	Rolf Järmann (SUI)	MG Maglificio–Technogym	s.t.
5	Danny Nelissen (NED)	Rabobank	+ 1' 35"
6	Frédéric Moncassin (FRA)	GAN	+ 3' 54"
7	Alex Zülle (SUI)	ONCE	+ 4' 05"
8	Evgeni Berzin (RUS)	Gewiss Playbus	+ 4' 08"
9	Abraham Olano (ESP)	Mapei–GB	+ 4' 12"
10	Bjarne Riis (DEN)	Team Telekom	+ 4' 16"

== Stage 5 ==
4 July 1996 — Lac de Madine to Besançon, 242 km (150 mi)

Stage 5 result

Rank	Rider	Team	Time
1	Jeroen Blijlevens (NED)	TVM–Farm Frites	6h 55' 53"
2	Frédéric Moncassin (FRA)	GAN	s.t.
3	Erik Zabel (GER)	Team Telekom	s.t.
4	Mario Traversoni (ITA)	Carrera Jeans–Tassoni	s.t.
5	Djamolidine Abdoujaparov (UZB)	Refin–Mobilvetta	s.t.
6	Andrea Ferrigato (ITA)	Roslotto–ZG Mobili	s.t.
7	Fabio Baldato (ITA)	MG Maglificio–Technogym	s.t.
8	Claudio Camin (ITA)	Brescialat	s.t.
9	Nicola Minali (ITA)	Gewiss Playbus	s.t.
10	Zbigniew Spruch (POL)	Panaria–Vinavil	s.t.

General classification after stage 5

Rank	Rider	Team	Time
1	Stéphane Heulot (FRA)	GAN	29h 49' 48"
2	Mariano Piccoli (ITA)	Brescialat	+ 20"
3	Cyril Saugrain (FRA)	Aubervilliers 93	+ 34"
4	Rolf Järmann (SUI)	MG Maglificio–Technogym	s.t.
5	Danny Nelissen (NED)	Rabobank	+ 1' 35"
6	Frédéric Moncassin (FRA)	GAN	+ 3' 32"
7	Alex Zülle (SUI)	ONCE	+ 4' 05"
8	Evgeni Berzin (RUS)	Gewiss Playbus	+ 4' 08"
9	Abraham Olano (ESP)	Mapei–GB	+ 4' 12"
10	Bjarne Riis (DEN)	Team Telekom	+ 4' 16"

== Stage 6 ==
5 July 1996 — Arc-et-Senans to Aix-les-Bains, 207 km (129 mi)

Stage 6 result

Rank	Rider	Team	Time
1	Michael Boogerd (NED)	Rabobank	5h 05' 38"
2	Erik Zabel (GER)	Team Telekom	+ 1"
3	Laurent Jalabert (FRA)	ONCE	s.t.
4	Andrei Tchmil (RUS)	Lotto	s.t.
5	Fabio Baldato (ITA)	MG Maglificio–Technogym	s.t.
6	Jesper Skibby (DEN)	TVM–Farm Frites	s.t.
7	Andrea Tafi (ITA)	Mapei–GB	s.t.
8	Rolf Sørensen (DEN)	Rabobank	s.t.
9	Paolo Fornaciari (ITA)	Saeco–AS Juvenes San Marino	s.t.
10	Zbigniew Spruch (POL)	Panaria–Vinavil	s.t.

General classification after stage 6

Rank	Rider	Team	Time
1	Stéphane Heulot (FRA)	GAN	34h 55' 27"
2	Mariano Piccoli (ITA)	Brescialat	+ 20"
3	Alex Zülle (SUI)	ONCE	+ 4' 05"
4	Laurent Jalabert (FRA)	ONCE	+ 4' 06"
5	Evgeni Berzin (RUS)	Gewiss Playbus	+ 4' 08"
6	Abraham Olano (ESP)	Mapei–GB	+ 4' 12"
7	Bjarne Riis (DEN)	Team Telekom	+ 4' 16"
8	Miguel Induráin (ESP)	Banesto	+ 4' 17"
9	Rolf Järmann (SUI)	MG Maglificio–Technogym	+ 4' 20"
10	Chris Boardman (GBR)	GAN	+ 4' 22"

== Stage 7 ==
6 July 1996 — Chambéry to Les Arcs, 200 km (120 mi)

Stage 7 result

Rank	Rider	Team	Time
1	Luc Leblanc (FRA)	Team Polti	5h 47' 22"
2	Tony Rominger (SUI)	Mapei–GB	+ 47"
3	Peter Luttenberger (AUT)	Carrera Jeans–Tassoni	+ 52"
4	Richard Virenque (FRA)	Festina–Lotus	s.t.
5	Laurent Dufaux (SUI)	Festina–Lotus	s.t.
6	Abraham Olano (ESP)	Mapei–GB	s.t.
7	Bjarne Riis (DEN)	Team Telekom	+ 56"
8	Fernando Escartín (ESP)	Kelme–Artiach	s.t.
9	Jan Ullrich (GER)	Team Telekom	s.t.
10	Piotr Ugrumov (LAT)	Roslotto–ZG Mobili	s.t.

General classification after stage 7

Rank	Rider	Team	Time
1	Evgeni Berzin (RUS)	Gewiss Playbus	40h 47' 53"
2	Abraham Olano (ESP)	Mapei–GB	s.t.
3	Tony Rominger (SUI)	Mapei–GB	+ 7"
4	Bjarne Riis (DEN)	Team Telekom	+ 8"
5	Jan Ullrich (GER)	Team Telekom	+ 30"
6	Richard Virenque (FRA)	Festina–Lotus	+ 31"
7	Laurent Dufaux (SUI)	Festina–Lotus	+ 37"
8	Piotr Ugrumov (LAT)	Roslotto–ZG Mobili	+ 40"
9	Peter Luttenberger (AUT)	Carrera Jeans–Tassoni	+ 59"
10	Fernando Escartín (ESP)	Kelme–Artiach	+ 1' 02"

== Stage 8 ==
7 July 1996 — Bourg-Saint-Maurice to Val d'Isère, 30.5 km (19.0 mi) (ITT)

Stage 8 result

Rank	Rider	Team	Time
1	Evgeni Berzin (RUS)	Gewiss Playbus	51' 53"
2	Bjarne Riis (DEN)	Team Telekom	+ 35"
3	Abraham Olano (ESP)	Mapei–GB	+ 45"
4	Tony Rominger (SUI)	Mapei–GB	+ 1' 01"
5	Miguel Induráin (ESP)	Banesto	s.t.
6	Jan Ullrich (GER)	Team Telekom	+ 1' 07"
7	Peter Luttenberger (AUT)	Carrera Jeans–Tassoni	+ 1' 36"
8	Chris Boardman (GBR)	GAN	+ 2' 30"
9	Alex Zülle (SUI)	ONCE	+ 2' 36"
10	Udo Bölts (GER)	Team Telekom	+ 2' 52"

General classification after stage 8

Rank	Rider	Team	Time
1	Evgeni Berzin (RUS)	Gewiss Playbus	41h 39' 46"
2	Bjarne Riis (DEN)	Team Telekom	+ 43"
3	Abraham Olano (ESP)	Mapei–GB	+ 45"
4	Tony Rominger (SUI)	Mapei–GB	+ 1' 08"
5	Jan Ullrich (GER)	Team Telekom	+ 1' 37"
6	Peter Luttenberger (AUT)	Carrera Jeans–Tassoni	+ 2' 35"
7	Richard Virenque (FRA)	Festina–Lotus	+ 3' 56"
8	Laurent Dufaux (SUI)	Festina–Lotus	+ 4' 08"
9	Piotr Ugrumov (LAT)	Roslotto–ZG Mobili	+ 4' 25"
10	Fernando Escartín (ESP)	Kelme–Artiach	+ 4' 50"

== Stage 9 ==
8 July 1996 — Le Monêtier-les-Bains to Sestriere (Italy), 46 km (29 mi)

This stage was shortened due to bad weather.

Stage 9 result

Rank	Rider	Team	Time
1	Bjarne Riis (DEN)	Team Telekom	1h 10' 44"
2	Luc Leblanc (FRA)	Team Polti	+ 24"
3	Richard Virenque (FRA)	Festina–Lotus	+ 26"
4	Tony Rominger (SUI)	Mapei–GB	+ 28"
5	Miguel Induráin (ESP)	Banesto	s.t.
6	Udo Bölts (GER)	Team Telekom	+ 41"
7	Fernando Escartín (ESP)	Kelme–Artiach	+ 42"
8	Jan Ullrich (GER)	Team Telekom	+ 44"
9	Peter Luttenberger (AUT)	Carrera Jeans–Tassoni	+ 46"
10	Abraham Olano (ESP)	Mapei–GB	+ 54"

General classification after stage 9

Rank	Rider	Team	Time
1	Bjarne Riis (DEN)	Team Telekom	42h 51' 13"
2	Evgeni Berzin (RUS)	Gewiss Playbus	+ 40"
3	Tony Rominger (SUI)	Mapei–GB	+ 53"
4	Abraham Olano (ESP)	Mapei–GB	+ 56"
5	Jan Ullrich (GER)	Team Telekom	+ 1' 38"
6	Peter Luttenberger (AUT)	Carrera Jeans–Tassoni	+ 2' 38"
7	Richard Virenque (FRA)	Festina–Lotus	+ 3' 39"
8	Miguel Induráin (ESP)	Banesto	+ 4' 38"
9	Fernando Escartín (ESP)	Kelme–Artiach	+ 4' 49"
10	Laurent Dufaux (SUI)	Festina–Lotus	+ 5' 03"

== Stage 10 ==
9 July 1996 — Turin (Italy) to Gap, 208.5 km (129.6 mi)

Stage 10 result

Rank	Rider	Team	Time
1	Erik Zabel (GER)	Team Telekom	5h 08' 10"
2	Djamolidine Abdoujaparov (UZB)	Refin–Mobilvetta	s.t.
3	Andrea Ferrigato (ITA)	Roslotto–ZG Mobili	s.t.
4	Fabio Baldato (ITA)	MG Maglificio–Technogym	s.t.
5	Emmanuel Magnien (FRA)	Festina–Lotus	s.t.
6	Alessandro Bertolini (ITA)	Brescialat	s.t.
7	Francesco Frattini (ITA)	Gewiss Playbus	s.t.
8	Viatcheslav Ekimov (RUS)	Rabobank	s.t.
9	Maurizio Fondriest (ITA)	Roslotto–ZG Mobili	s.t.
10	Laurent Dufaux (SUI)	Festina–Lotus	s.t.

General classification after stage 10

Rank	Rider	Team	Time
1	Bjarne Riis (DEN)	Team Telekom	47h 59' 23"
2	Evgeni Berzin (RUS)	Gewiss Playbus	+ 40"
3	Tony Rominger (SUI)	Mapei–GB	+ 53"
4	Abraham Olano (ESP)	Mapei–GB	+ 56"
5	Jan Ullrich (GER)	Team Telekom	+ 1' 38"
6	Peter Luttenberger (AUT)	Carrera Jeans–Tassoni	+ 2' 38"
7	Richard Virenque (FRA)	Festina–Lotus	+ 3' 39"
8	Miguel Induráin (ESP)	Banesto	+ 4' 38"
9	Fernando Escartín (ESP)	Kelme–Artiach	+ 4' 49"
10	Laurent Dufaux (SUI)	Festina–Lotus	+ 5' 03"
