= 1996 Tour de France =

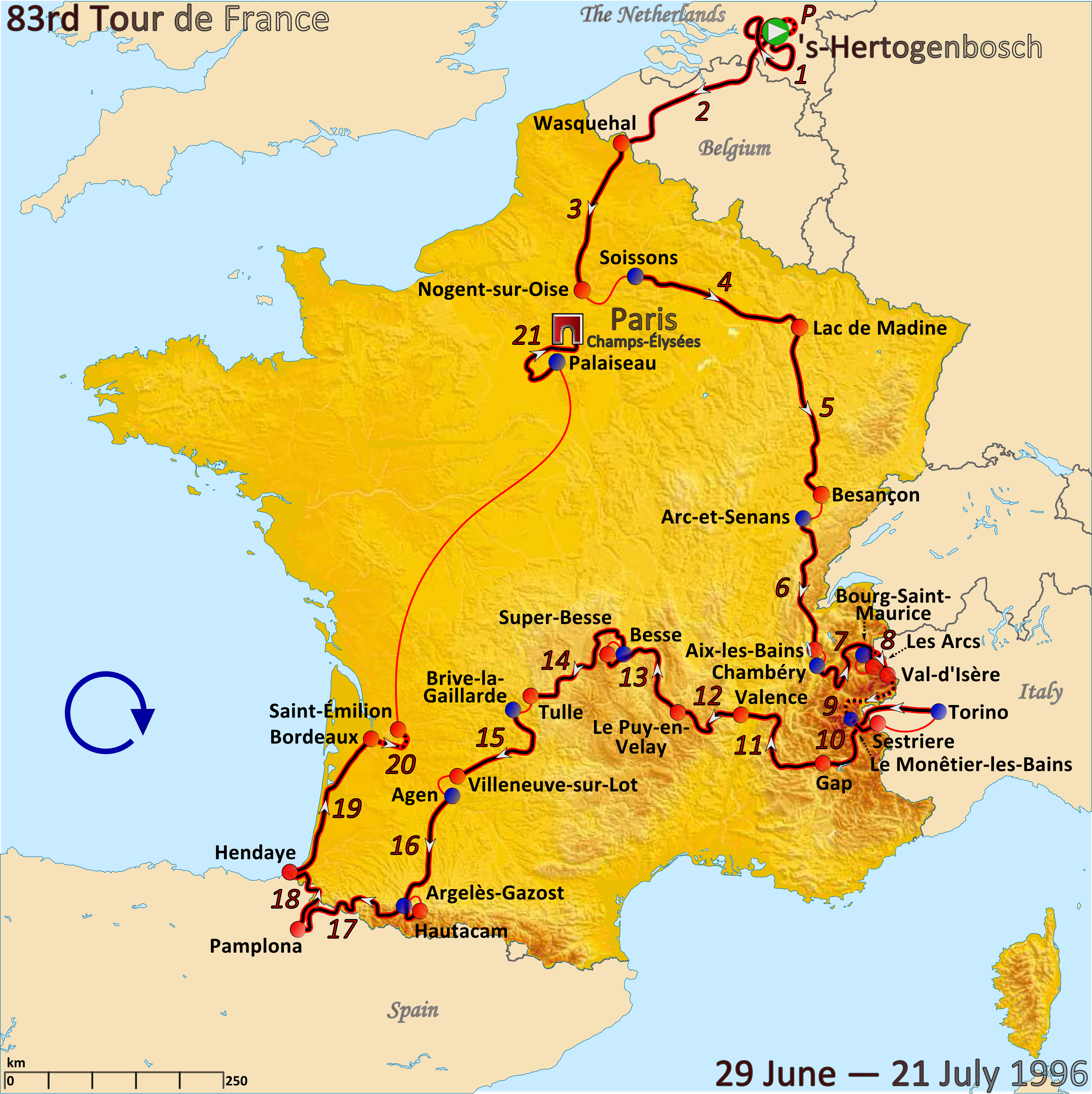
- Route of the 1996 Tour de France

Race details
- Dates: 29 June – 21 July 1996
- Stages: 21 + Prologue
- Distance: 3,765 km (2,339 mi)
- Winning time: 95h 57' 16"

Results
Jersey awarded to the overall winner	Winner	Bjarne Riis (Note: In 2007, Bjarne Riis admitted to the use of doping during the 1996 Tour. Shortly after his confession, the organisers of the Tour de France have said that they did not consider him a winner, but under UCI regulations at the time, the statute of limitations (ten years) had passed, meaning they could not strip him of his results. The same applies for Erik Zabel, the winner of the points classification.) (DEN)	(Team Telekom)
	Second	Jan Ullrich (GER)	(Team Telekom)
	Third	Richard Virenque (FRA)	(Festina–Lotus)
Jersey awarded to the points classification winner	Points	Erik Zabel (GER)	(Team Telekom)
Jersey awarded to the mountains classification winner	Mountains	Richard Virenque (FRA)	(Festina–Lotus)
	Young rider	Jan Ullrich (GER)	(Team Telekom)
	Combativity	Richard Virenque (FRA)	(Festina–Lotus)
	Team	Festina–Lotus	

The 1996 Tour de France was the 83rd edition of the Tour de France, starting on 29 June and ending on 21 July, featuring 19 regular stages, 2 individual time trials, a prologue and a rest day (10 July).

The 1996 Tour was won by Danish rider Bjarne Riis, who controversially admitted in 2007 he was doping throughout the years 1993–1998, and many years later (still officially the 'winner') saying he had "no regrets" that he had doped.

This Tour was noted by the 'fall' of favourite Miguel Induráin, ending his record run of five consecutive victories. The course included a stage through his home town Villava, however he suffered a bronchitis because of the poor weather in the first week, and was fined and penalised for accepting drinks illegally. Indurain started to lose time in stage 7, and finally ended 11th, failing to win a single stage or spend one day in the yellow jersey.

Stage 9 was scheduled to be a 176 kilometre ride from Val-d'Isère to Sestriere. However, due to appalling weather conditions, including snow, the organisers cut the stage to just 46 km. Bjarne Riis won the stage and opened a crucial 44 second gap over Telekom teammate Jan Ullrich. Ullrich, only 22, really broke through in this Tour, and won the individual time trial of stage 20.

Over a decade after the race, several riders with Team Telekom confessed to doping offences around the period of the 1996 tour, including support riders Rolf Aldag, Udo Bölts, Christian Henn and Brian Holm and team masseur Jef d'Hont has admitted in his autobiography that there was organised use of EPO in the team. On 24 May 2007, Erik Zabel admitted to using EPO during the first week of the race. The winner of the Tour, Bjarne Riis, admitted on 25 May 2007 that he also used EPO during the Tour, as a result was asked by the International Cycling Union (UCI) to return the yellow jersey he received. So far, runner-up Jan Ullrich, who has been under suspicion of doping as a part of the Operación Puerto doping case, has not commented on allegations that he also used EPO. Third place Richard Virenque and fourth place Laurent Dufaux were implicated in the 1998 Festina scandal.

UCI lawyer Philippe Verbiest stated in 2007 that the statute of limitations for removing Riis as winner of the Tour de France had expired, "you cannot strip him of the title but it is possible not to mention it anymore ... Because of what he admitted, he is not the winner of the Tour de France. Riis did not win." At the same time tour spokesman Philippe Sudres stated that: "We consider philosophically that he can no longer claim to have won." In 2007, Riis's victory was removed from the Tour de France, yet in 2008 they listed Riis as winner of Tour de France 1996, albeit with a remark about his confession.

== Teams ==
The 18 teams on top of the UCI rankings at the start of 1996 automatically qualified for the Tour. Four wildcards were given, for a total of 22 teams.

The teams entering the race were:

Qualified teams

- Banesto
- Carrera Jeans–Tassoni
- Festina–Lotus
- GAN
- Gewiss Playbus
- Lotto
- Mapei–GB
- MG Maglificio–Technogym
- Motorola
- ONCE
- Panaria–Vinavil
- Team Polti
- Rabobank
- Refin–Mobilvetta
- Roslotto–ZG Mobili
- Saeco–AS Juvenes San Marino
- Team Telekom
- TVM–Farm Frites

Invited teams

- Agrigel–La Creuse–Fenioux
- Aubervilliers 93
- Brescialat
- Kelme–Artiach

== Route and stages ==
The highest point of elevation in the race was 2,035 m (6,677 ft) at the summit of the Sestriere climb on stage 9. (Note: Two higher planned climbs were both cancelled because of bad weather, the Col du Galibier at 2,642 m (8,668 ft), and the Col de l'Iseran at 2,770 m (9,088 ft).)

Stage characteristics and winners
Stage	Date	Course	Distance	Type	Winner
P	29 June	's-Hertogenbosch (Netherlands)	9.4 km (5.8 mi)	Individual time trial	Alex Zülle (SUI)
1	30 June	's-Hertogenbosch (Netherlands)	209.0 km (129.9 mi)	Plain stage	Frédéric Moncassin (FRA)
2	1 July	's-Hertogenbosch (Netherlands) to Wasquehal	247.5 km (153.8 mi)	Plain stage	Mario Cipollini (ITA)
3	2 July	Wasquehal to Nogent-sur-Oise	195.0 km (121.2 mi)	Plain stage	Erik Zabel (GER)
4	3 July	Soissons to Lac de Madine	232.0 km (144.2 mi)	Plain stage	Cyril Saugrain (FRA)
5	4 July	Lac de Madine to Besançon	242.0 km (150.4 mi)	Plain stage	Jeroen Blijlevens (NED)
6	5 July	Arc-et-Senans to Aix-les-Bains	207.0 km (128.6 mi)	Hilly stage	Michael Boogerd (NED)
7	6 July	Chambéry to Les Arcs	200.0 km (124.3 mi)	Stage with mountain(s)	Luc Leblanc (FRA)
8	7 July	Bourg-Saint-Maurice to Val d'Isère	30.5 km (19.0 mi)	Individual time trial	Evgueni Berzin (RUS)
9	8 July	Le Monêtier-les-Bains to Sestriere (Italy)	46.0 km (28.6 mi)	Stage with mountain(s)	Bjarne Riis (DEN)
10	9 July	Turin (Italy) to Gap	208.5 km (129.6 mi)	Hilly stage	Erik Zabel (GER)
	10 July	Gap		Rest day	
11	11 July	Gap to Valence	202.0 km (125.5 mi)	Hilly stage	José Jaime Gonzalez (COL)
12	12 July	Valence to Le Puy-en-Velay	143.5 km (89.2 mi)	Hilly stage	Pascal Richard (SUI)
13	13 July	Le Puy-en-Velay to Super Besse	177.0 km (110.0 mi)	Hilly stage	Rolf Sørensen (DEN)
14	14 July	Besse to Tulle	186.5 km (115.9 mi)	Hilly stage	Djamolidine Abdoujaparov (UZB)
15	15 July	Brive-la-Gaillarde to Villeneuve-sur-Lot	176.0 km (109.4 mi)	Plain stage	Massimo Podenzana (ITA)
16	16 July	Agen to Hautacam	199.0 km (123.7 mi)	Stage with mountain(s)	Bjarne Riis (DEN)
17	17 July	Argelès-Gazost to Pamplona (Spain)	262.0 km (162.8 mi)	Stage with mountain(s)	Laurent Dufaux (SUI)
18	18 July	Pamplona (Spain) to Hendaye	154.5 km (96.0 mi)	Hilly stage	Bart Voskamp (NED)
19	19 July	Hendaye to Bordeaux	226.5 km (140.7 mi)	Plain stage	Frédéric Moncassin (FRA)
20	20 July	Bordeaux to Saint-Émilion	63.5 km (39.5 mi)	Individual time trial	Jan Ullrich (GER)
21	21 July	Palaiseau to Paris (Champs-Élysées)	147.5 km (91.7 mi)	Plain stage	Fabio Baldato (ITA)
	Total		3,765 km (2,339 mi)		

== Race overview ==
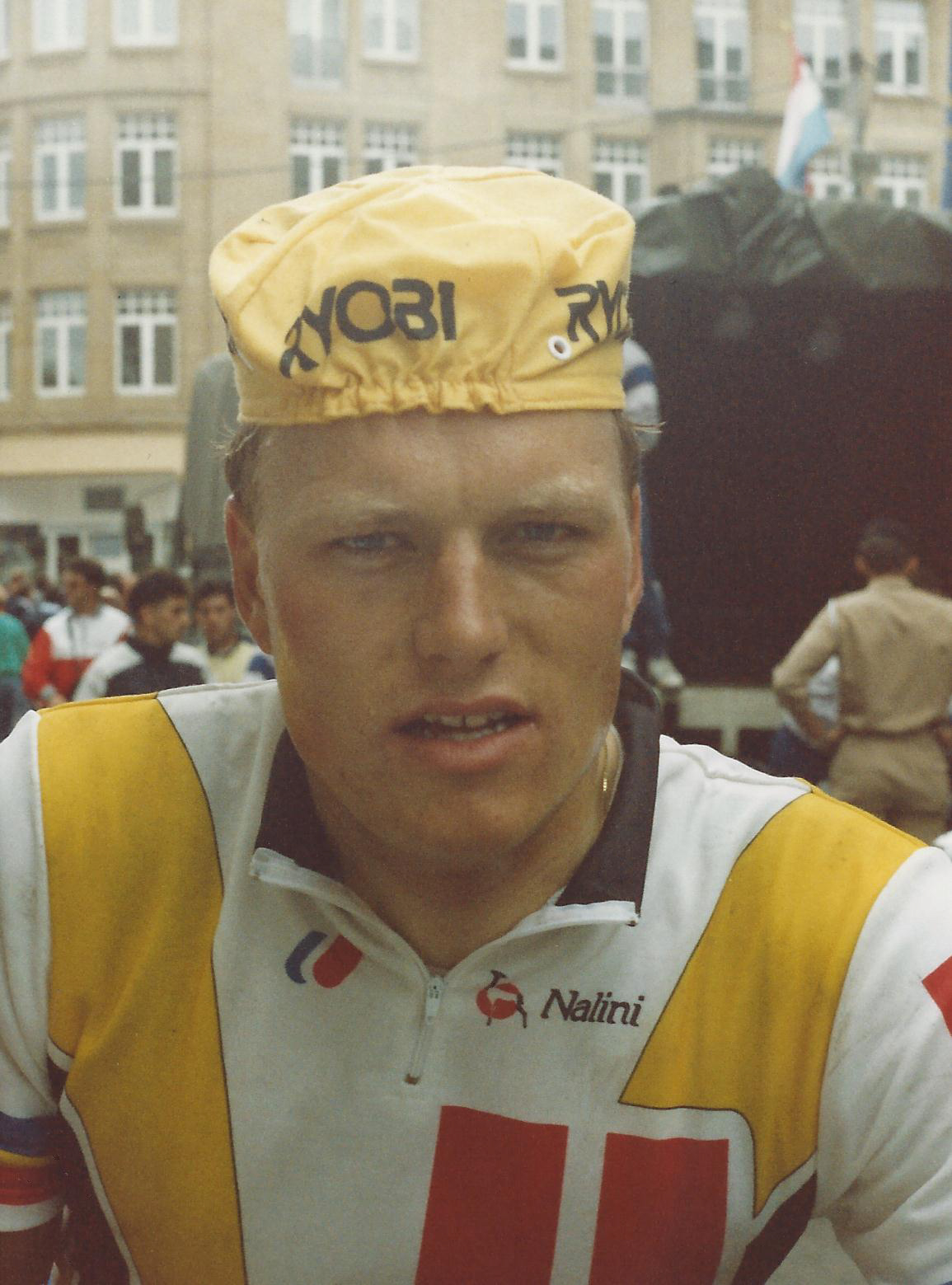
Bjarne Riis (pictured in 1989) won the general classification

The prologue was won by Alex Zülle two seconds ahead of specialist Chris Boardman as overall contenders Bjarne Riis and Miguel Induráin came in sixth and seventh respectively. Zulle held onto the yellow jersey through the first few flat stages but in stage 4 a half dozen riders not in overall contention escaped in a breakaway and stayed away finishing several minutes ahead of the main field putting Stéphane Heulot in the yellow jersey for a few days.

Stage six to Aix-les-Bains was an intermediate stage run in terrible weather conditions and was won by Dutchman Michael Boogerd. The inclement weather caused well over a dozen riders to abandon the race including Lance Armstrong who merely thought he was sick from riding in the rainy, cold weather as most of the other riders who abandoned were, but within a few months he would be diagnosed with the cancer that nearly killed him.

As the Tour entered the Alps, stage eight was a mountain time trial which was won by Evgeni Berzin, whom had seized the lead in the overall classification following stage seven. In the time trial he finished more than thirty seconds better than Riis and gained just over a minute on Indurain, Tony Rominger and debutant Jan Ullrich who was having an impressive start to his first Tour.

Stage nine was a mountain stage to Sestriere, shortened to just 46.0 km (28.6 mi) to snow on the mountain passes. The stage was won by Riis, who in the process took enough time to put himself into yellow. He would maintain a narrow lead over the next several stages and by the time the race reached the Pyrenees Abraham Olano was in second just under a minute behind with Berzin in third, Rominger in fourth, Riis's teammate Ullrich in fifth and five-time defending champion Miguel Induráin struggling to stay in the top ten nearly 5:00 back.

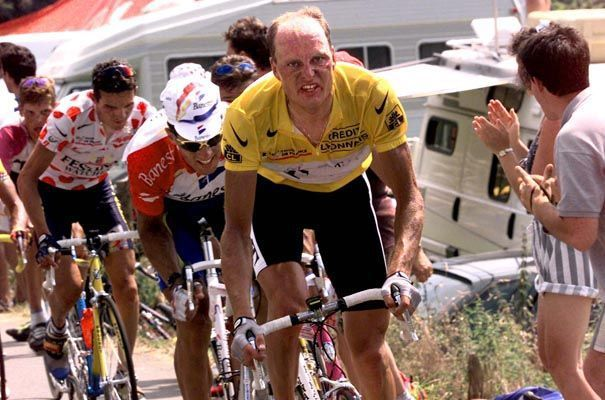
Bjarne Riis attacking Miguel Induráin, Richard Virenque, and others on the stage to Hautacam

During stage sixteen Riis made a number of false attacks, even falling back and feigning exhaustion to get a look at Indurain, Rominger, Luttenberger, Virenque, Dufaux, Leblanc and Olano to read their faces before finally launching an attack on the Hautacam. He put close to a minute into most of the elite riders and beyond that into everybody else, effectively winning the Tour and putting it beyond doubt that Indurain would not win his sixth tour.

Stage seventeen was won by Laurent Dufaux who in the process moved into fourth place overall, but Riis finished in the same time. A group of eight riders dropped the rest of the field in this stage and as a result Riis distanced himself from all of his rivals with his own teammate Ullrich moving into second overall and Richard Virenque moving into third place overall.

Stage nineteen was a time trial, the last opportunity for major changes to be made in the general classification and the stage was won by Ullrich who finished nearly a minute ahead of second-placed Indurain who had dominated individual time trials at the Tour de France since the early 1990s. Riis had plenty of time to spare and was 1:41 ahead of his teammate Ullrich in the General Classification. Richard Virenque rounded out the podium also winning the mountains classification.

=== Doping ===
Even though rider admissions and investigations in the subsequent years showed that Tours during this time period were undoubtedly tainted by doping 1996 winner Riis, 1997 winner Ullrich and 1998 winner Marco Pantani all officially retain their Tour victories. Pantani died just a few years after his Tour victory, as a result of mental health issues resulting from constant attacks from the press and Ullrich had some results voided later in his career, but his four 2nd-place finishes to Lance Armstrong and his 1996 2nd place to Riis remain on his record.

== Classification leadership and minor prizes ==
There were several classifications in the 1996 Tour de France. The most important was the general classification, calculated by adding each cyclist's finishing times on each stage. The cyclist with the least accumulated time was the race leader, identified by the yellow jersey; the winner of this classification is considered the winner of the Tour.

Additionally, there was a points classification, which awarded a green jersey. In the points classification, cyclists got points for finishing among the best in a stage finish, or in intermediate sprints. The cyclist with the most points lead the classification, and was identified with a green jersey.

There was also a mountains classification. The organisation had categorised some climbs as either hors catégorie, first, second, third, or fourth-category; points for this classification were won by the first cyclists that reached the top of these climbs first, with more points available for the higher-categorised climbs. The cyclist with the most points lead the classification, and wore a white jersey with red polka dots.

The fourth individual classification was the young rider classification, which was not marked by a jersey. This was decided the same way as the general classification, but only riders under 26 years were eligible.

For the team classification, the times of the best three cyclists per team on each stage were added; the leading team was the team with the lowest total time.

In addition, there was a combativity award given after each mass-start stage to the cyclist considered most combative. The decision was made by a jury composed of journalists who gave points. The cyclist with the most points from votes in all stages led the combativity classification. Richard Virenque won this classification, and was given overall the super-combativity award. The Souvenir Henri Desgrange was given in honour of Tour founder Henri Desgrange to the first rider to pass the summit of the Col d'Aubisque on stage 17. (Note: In the 1996 Tour de France, the two first-choice customary Souvenir Henri Desgrange summit passes of the Col du Galibier or the highest climb of the race, the Col de l'Iseran, respectively, were both cancelled because of bad weather.) This prize was won by Neil Stephens.

Classification leadership by stage
Stage	Winner	General classification	Points classification	Mountains classification	Young rider classification (Note: A white jersey was not awarded to the leader of the young rider classification between 1989 and 1999.)	Team classification	Combativity	
Stage	Winner	General classification	Points classification	Mountains classification	Young rider classification	Team classification	Award	Classification
P	Alex Zülle	Alex Zülle	Alex Zülle	no award	Christophe Moreau	ONCE	no award	
1	Frédéric Moncassin	Alex Zülle	Ján Svorada	no award	Paolo Savoldelli	ONCE	Danny Nelissen	Danny Nelissen
2	Mario Cipollini	Alex Zülle	Ján Svorada	Danny Nelissen	Paolo Savoldelli	ONCE	Rossano Brasi	Danny Nelissen
3	Erik Zabel	Frédéric Moncassin	Ján Svorada	José Luis Arrieta	Jeroen Blijlevens	ONCE	Marco Lietti	Danny Nelissen
4	Cyril Saugrain	Stéphane Heulot	Frédéric Moncassin	Danny Nelissen	Stéphane Heulot	GAN	Mariano Piccoli	Danny Nelissen
5	Jeroen Blijlevens	Stéphane Heulot	Frédéric Moncassin	Danny Nelissen	Stéphane Heulot	GAN	Giuseppe Calcaterra	Danny Nelissen
6	Michael Boogerd	Stéphane Heulot	Frédéric Moncassin	Léon van Bon	Stéphane Heulot	Rabobank	Léon van Bon	Danny Nelissen
7	Luc Leblanc	Evgeni Berzin	Frédéric Moncassin	Richard Virenque	Jan Ullrich	Mapei–GB	Udo Bölts	Danny Nelissen
8	Evgeni Berzin	Evgeni Berzin	Frédéric Moncassin	Richard Virenque	Jan Ullrich	Team Telekom	no award	Danny Nelissen
9	Bjarne Riis	Bjarne Riis	Frédéric Moncassin	Richard Virenque	Jan Ullrich	Team Telekom	Bjarne Riis	Danny Nelissen
10	Erik Zabel	Bjarne Riis	Erik Zabel	Richard Virenque	Jan Ullrich	Team Telekom	Rolf Sørensen	Danny Nelissen
11	Chepe González	Bjarne Riis	Erik Zabel	Richard Virenque	Jan Ullrich	Mapei–GB	Laurent Brochard	Danny Nelissen
12	Pascal Richard	Bjarne Riis	Erik Zabel	Richard Virenque	Jan Ullrich	Rabobank	Erik Breukink	Danny Nelissen
13	Rolf Sørensen	Bjarne Riis	Erik Zabel	Richard Virenque	Jan Ullrich	Mapei–GB	Richard Virenque	Danny Nelissen
14	Djamolidine Abdoujaparov	Bjarne Riis	Erik Zabel	Richard Virenque	Jan Ullrich	Mapei–GB	Bo Hamburger	Danny Nelissen
15	Massimo Podenzana	Bjarne Riis	Erik Zabel	Richard Virenque	Jan Ullrich	Mapei–GB	Michele Bartoli	Danny Nelissen
16	Bjarne Riis	Bjarne Riis	Erik Zabel	Richard Virenque	Jan Ullrich	Mapei–GB	Laurent Roux	Richard Virenque
17	Laurent Dufaux	Bjarne Riis	Erik Zabel	Richard Virenque	Jan Ullrich	Festina–Lotus	Bjarne Riis	Bjarne Riis
18	Bart Voskamp	Bjarne Riis	Erik Zabel	Richard Virenque	Jan Ullrich	Festina–Lotus	Michele Bartoli	Bjarne Riis
19	Frédéric Moncassin	Bjarne Riis	Erik Zabel	Richard Virenque	Jan Ullrich	Festina–Lotus	Gilles Talmant	Bjarne Riis
20	Jan Ullrich	Bjarne Riis	Erik Zabel	Richard Virenque	Jan Ullrich	Festina–Lotus	no award	Bjarne Riis
21	Fabio Baldato	Bjarne Riis	Erik Zabel	Richard Virenque	Jan Ullrich	Festina–Lotus	Andrei Tchmil	Richard Virenque
Final		Bjarne Riis	Erik Zabel	Richard Virenque	Jan Ullrich	Festina–Lotus	Richard Virenque	

- In stage 1, Chris Boardman wore the green jersey.

== Final standings ==
Legend
A yellow jersey.	Denotes the winner of the general classification	A green jersey.	Denotes the winner of the points classification
A white jersey with red polka dots.	Denotes the winner of the mountains classification		

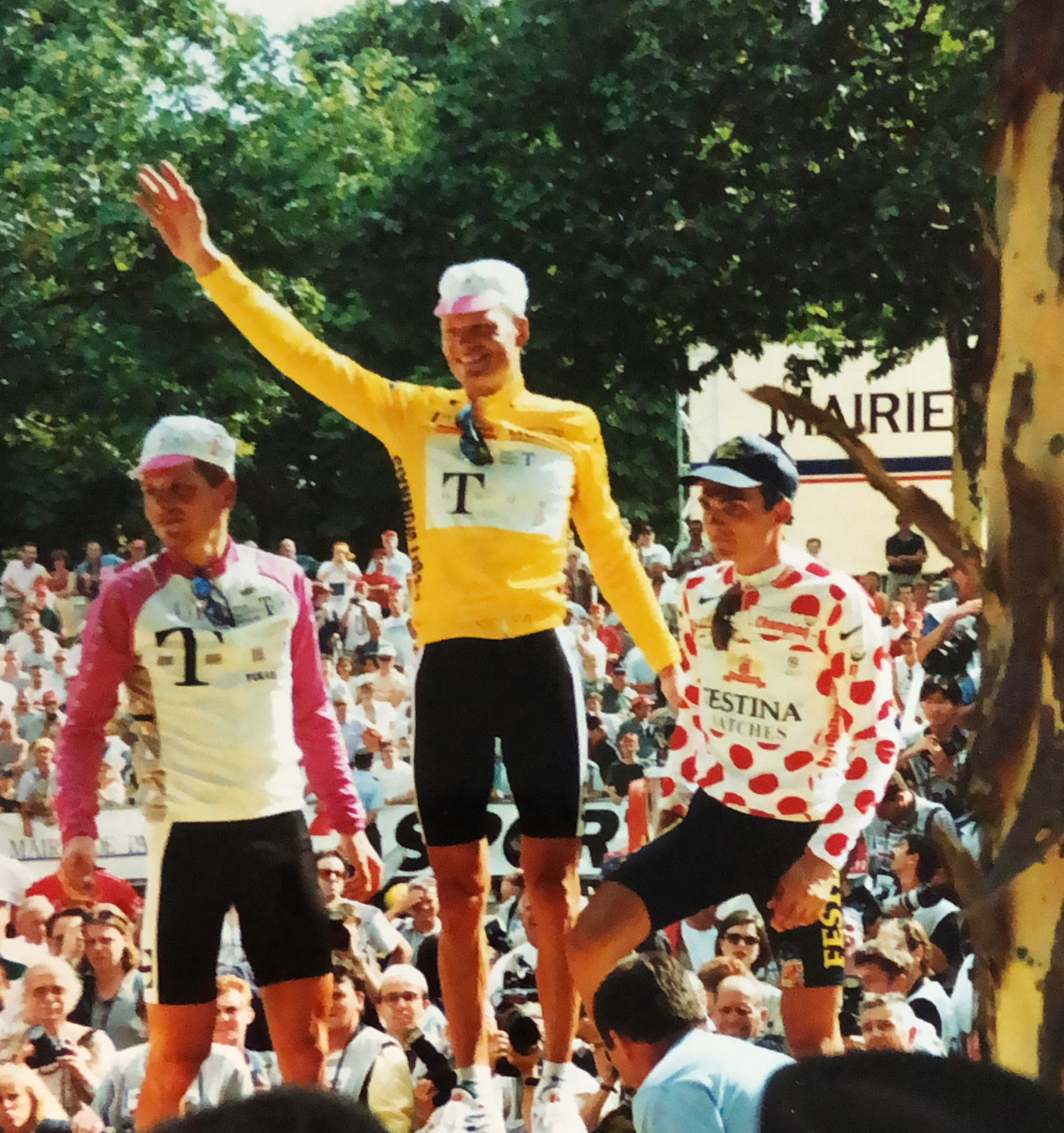
The first three in the General classification: from left: Jan Ullrich, Bjarne Riis and Richard Virenque

=== General classification ===
Final general classification (1–10)
Rank	Rider	Team	Time
1	Bjarne Riis (DEN)	Team Telekom	95h 57' 16"
2	Jan Ullrich (GER)	Team Telekom	+ 1' 41"
3	Richard Virenque (FRA)	Festina–Lotus	+ 4' 37"
4	Laurent Dufaux (SUI)	Festina–Lotus	+ 5' 53"
5	Peter Luttenberger (AUT)	Carrera Jeans–Tassoni	+ 7' 07"
6	Luc Leblanc (FRA)	Team Polti	+ 10' 03"
7	Piotr Ugrumov (LAT)	Roslotto–ZG Mobili	+ 10' 04"
8	Fernando Escartín (ESP)	Kelme–Artiach	+ 10' 26"
9	Abraham Olano (ESP)	Mapei–GB	+ 11' 00"
10	Tony Rominger (SUI)	Mapei–GB	+ 11' 53"

Final general classification (11–129)
Rank	Rider	Team	Time
11	Miguel Induráin (ESP)	Banesto	+ 14' 14"
12	Patrick Jonker (AUS)	ONCE	+ 18' 58"
13	Bo Hamburger (DEN)	TVM–Farm Frites	+ 22' 19"
14	Udo Bölts (GER)	Team Telekom	+ 25' 56"
15	Alberto Elli (ITA)	MG Maglificio–Technogym	+ 26' 18"
16	Manuel Fernández Ginés (ESP)	Mapei–GB	+ 26' 28"
17	Leonardo Piepoli (ITA)	Refin	+ 27' 36"
18	Laurent Brochard (FRA)	Festina–Lotus	+ 32' 11"
19	Michele Bartoli (ITA)	MG Maglificio–Technogym	+ 37' 18"
20	Evgueni Berzin (RUS)	Gewiss Playbus	+ 38' 00"
21	Viatcheslav Ekimov (RUS)	Rabobank	+ 43' 58"
22	Stefano Cattai (ITA)	Roslotto–ZG Mobili	+ 48' 03"
23	Laurent Madouas (FRA)	Motorola	+ 53' 15"
24	Arsenio González (ESP)	Mapei–GB	+ 55' 28"
25	Massimiliano Lelli (ITA)	Saeco–AS Juvenes San Marino	+ 55' 35"
26	Alex Zülle (SUI)	ONCE	+ 56' 47"
27	Giuseppe Guerini (ITA)	Team Polti	+ 1h 05' 12"
28	Rolf Sørensen (DEN)	Rabobank	+ 1h 11' 28"
29	Jesper Skibby (DEN)	TVM–Farm Frites	+ 1h 11' 36"
30	Marco Fincato (ITA)	Roslotto–ZG Mobili	+ 1h 11' 51"
31	Michael Boogerd (NED)	Rabobank	+ 1h 13' 45"
32	José Luis Arrieta (ESP)	Banesto	+ 1h 13' 48"
33	Paolo Savoldelli (ITA)	Roslotto–ZG Mobili	+ 1h 15' 20"
34	Erik Breukink (NED)	Rabobank	+ 1h 20' 03"
35	Aitor Garmendia (ESP)	ONCE	+ 1h 20' 42"
36	Oscar Camenzind (SUI)	Panaria–Vinavil	+ 1h 25' 27"
37	Claudio Chiappucci (ITA)	Carrera Jeans–Tassoni	+ 1h 27' 23"
38	Melcior Mauri (ESP)	ONCE	+ 1h 27' 28"
39	Chris Boardman (GBR)	GAN	+ 1h 27' 44"
40	Federico Echave (ESP)	Mapei–GB	+ 1h 29' 25"
41	José Roberto Sierra (ESP)	ONCE	+ 1h 30' 11"
42	Pascal Hervé (FRA)	Festina–Lotus	+ 1h 33' 01"
43	Mirco Gualdi (ITA)	Team Polti	+ 1h 34' 59"
44	Laurent Roux (FRA)	TVM–Farm Frites	+ 1h 36' 11"
45	Andrea Tafi (ITA)	Mapei–GB	+ 1h 38' 54"
46	Andrea Ferrigato (ITA)	Roslotto–ZG Mobili	+ 1h 39' 23"
47	Pascal Richard (SUI)	MG Maglificio–Technogym	+ 1h 40' 56"
48	Félix García Casas (ESP)	Festina–Lotus	+ 1h 42' 13"
49	Neil Stephens (AUS)	ONCE	+ 1h 43' 33"
50	Davide Perona (ITA)	Gewiss Playbus	+ 1h 43' 40"
51	Maurizio Fondriest (ITA)	Roslotto–ZG Mobili	+ 1h 45' 44"
52	Valentino Fois (ITA)	Panaria–Vinavil	+ 1h 45' 58"
53	Herminio Díaz Zabala (ESP)	ONCE	+ 1h 47' 08"
54	Orlando Rodrigues (POR)	Banesto	+ 1h 47' 15"
55	Bruno Thibout (FRA)	Motorola	+ 1h 49' 02"
56	Bruno Cenghialta (ITA)	Gewiss Playbus	+ 1h 49' 19"
57	José María Jiménez (ESP)	Banesto	+ 1h 51' 30"
58	Prudencio Induráin (ESP)	Banesto	+ 1h 52' 30"
59	Paolo Lanfranchi (ITA)	Mapei–GB	+ 1h 54' 42"
60	Flavio Vanzella (ITA)	Motorola	+ 1h 54' 52"
61	Massimo Podenzana (ITA)	Carrera Jeans–Tassoni	+ 1h 55' 18"
62	Thierry Bourguignon (FRA)	Aubervilliers 93	+ 1h 56' 38"
63	Fabio Baldato (ITA)	MG Maglificio–Technogym	+ 1h 57' 08"
64	Maarten den Bakker (NED)	TVM–Farm Frites	+ 1h 58' 25"
65	Marcello Siboni (ITA)	Carrera Jeans–Tassoni	+ 2h 00' 52"
66	Marino Alonso (ESP)	Banesto	+ 2h 00' 55"
67	Jean-Pierre Bourgeot (FRA)	Agrigel–La Creuse–Fenioux	+ 2h 01' 22"
68	Wladimir Belli (ITA)	Panaria–Vinavil	+ 2h 01' 42"
69	Cédric Vasseur (FRA)	GAN	+ 2h 02' 05"
70	Massimo Donati (ITA)	Saeco–AS Juvenes San Marino	+ 2h 02' 53"
71	José Joaquín Castelblanco (COL)	Kelme–Artiach	+ 2h 03' 01"
72	Marco Saligari (ITA)	MG Maglificio–Technogym	+ 2h 03' 09"
73	Marco Zen (ITA)	Roslotto–ZG Mobili	+ 2h 04' 03"
74	Erik Dekker (NED)	Rabobank	+ 2h 05' 03"
75	Christophe Moreau (FRA)	Festina–Lotus	+ 2h 07' 20"
76	Christian Henn (GER)	Team Telekom	+ 2h 07' 33"
77	Andréï Tchmil (BEL)	Lotto	+ 2h 09' 38"
78	Djamolidine Abduzhaparov (UZB)	Refin	+ 2h 10' 02"
79	Paolo Fornaciari (ITA)	Saeco–AS Juvenes San Marino	+ 2h 10' 04"
80	Bruno Boscardin (SUI)	Festina–Lotus	+ 2h 10' 12"
81	Julio César Aguirre (COL)	Kelme–Artiach	+ 2h 10' 23"
82	Erik Zabel (GER)	Team Telekom	+ 2h 10' 26"
83	Rolf Aldag (GER)	Team Telekom	+ 2h 12' 16"
84	Danny Nelissen (NED)	Rabobank	+ 2h 12' 25"
85	Oscar Pellicioli (ITA)	Carrera Jeans–Tassoni	+ 2h 13' 14"
86	François Simon (FRA)	GAN	+ 2h 16' 19"
87	Sergei Uslamin (RUS)	Refin	+ 2h 16' 30"
88	Jens Heppner (GER)	Team Telekom	+ 2h 17' 17"
89	Federico Muñoz (COL)	Kelme–Artiach	+ 2h 17' 25"
90	Rolf Järmann (SUI)	MG Maglificio–Technogym	+ 2h 20' 28"
91	François Lemarchand (FRA)	GAN	+ 2h 21' 15"
92	José Ramón Uriarte (ESP)	Banesto	+ 2h 23' 59"
93	Mariano Piccoli (ITA)	Brescialat	+ 2h 24' 29"
94	Cristian Salvato (ITA)	Refin	+ 2h 26' 59"
95	Johan Museeuw (BEL)	Mapei–GB	+ 2h 29' 02"
96	José Jaime González (COL)	Kelme–Artiach	+ 2h 29' 13"
97	Rossano Brasi (ITA)	Team Polti	+ 2h 30' 20"
98	Fabio Roscioli (ITA)	Refin	+ 2h 31' 06"
99	Bart Voskamp (NED)	TVM–Farm Frites	+ 2h 31' 31"
100	Francesco Frattini (ITA)	Gewiss Playbus	+ 2h 32' 06"
101	Scott Sunderland (AUS)	Lotto	+ 2h 32' 54"
102	Francisco Cabello (ESP)	Kelme–Artiach	+ 2h 36' 22"
103	Cristiano Frattini (ITA)	Brescialat	+ 2h 37' 56"
104	Thierry Laurent (FRA)	Agrigel–La Creuse–Fenioux	+ 2h 37' 57"
105	Omar Enrique Pumar (VEN)	Brescialat	+ 2h 38' 10"
106	Frédéric Moncassin (FRA)	GAN	+ 2h 38' 57"
107	Brian Holm (DEN)	Team Telekom	+ 2h 39' 51"
108	Frédérick Guesdon (FRA)	Team Polti	+ 2h 42' 49"
109	José Ángel Vidal (ESP)	Kelme–Artiach	+ 2h 42' 58"
110	Wilfried Peeters (BEL)	Mapei–GB	+ 2h 46' 47"
111	Frankie Andreu (USA)	Motorola	+ 2h 48' 46"
112	Alessandro Baronti (ITA)	Panaria–Vinavil	+ 2h 52' 37"
113	Tobias Steinhauser (GER)	Refin	+ 2h 54' 34"
114	Thierry Gouvenou (FRA)	Aubervilliers 93	+ 2h 54' 35"
115	Jacky Durand (FRA)	Agrigel–La Creuse–Fenioux	+ 2h 54' 39"
116	Peter Van Petegem (BEL)	TVM–Farm Frites	+ 2h 56' 10"
117	Dario Bottaro (ITA)	Gewiss Playbus	+ 2h 56' 38"
118	Gilles Talmant (FRA)	Aubervilliers 93	+ 2h 57' 35"
119	Gerrit de Vries (NED)	Team Polti	+ 3h 04' 45"
120	Paul Van Hyfte (BEL)	Lotto	+ 3h 06' 43"
121	Ivan Cerioli (ITA)	Gewiss Playbus	+ 3h 07' 50"
122	Peter Farazijn (BEL)	Lotto	+ 3h 14' 06"
123	Nico Mattan (BEL)	Lotto	+ 3h 14' 49"
124	Marc Wauters (BEL)	Lotto	+ 3h 15' 46"
125	Mario Chiesa (ITA)	Carrera Jeans–Tassoni	+ 3h 18' 02"
126	Simone Biasci (ITA)	Saeco–AS Juvenes San Marino	+ 3h 22' 16"
127	Eros Poli (ITA)	Saeco–AS Juvenes San Marino	+ 3h 34' 38"
128	Jeroen Blijlevens (NED)	TVM–Farm Frites	+ 3h 35' 12"
129	Jean-Luc Masdupuy (FRA)	Agrigel–La Creuse–Fenioux	+ 3h 49' 52"

=== Points classification ===
Final points classification (1–10)
Rank	Rider	Team	Points
1	Erik Zabel (GER)	Team Telekom	335
2	Frédéric Moncassin (FRA)	GAN	284
3	Fabio Baldato (ITA)	MG Maglificio–Technogym	255
4	Djamolidine Abduzhaparov (UZB)	Refin–Mobilvetta	204
5	Jeroen Blijlevens (NED)	TVM–Farm Frites	158
6	Andrei Tchmil (UKR)	Lotto	132
7	Bjarne Riis (DEN)	Team Telekom	129
8	Andrea Ferrigato (ITA)	Roslotto–ZG Mobili	126
9	Richard Virenque (FRA)	Festina–Lotus	124
10	Mariano Piccoli (ITA)	Brescialat	122

=== Mountains classification ===
Final mountains classification (1–10)
Rank	Rider	Team	Points
1	Richard Virenque (FRA)	Festina–Lotus	383
2	Bjarne Riis (DEN)	Team Telekom	274
3	Laurent Dufaux (SUI)	Festina–Lotus	176
4	Laurent Brochard (FRA)	Festina–Lotus	168
5	Luc Leblanc (FRA)	Team Polti	158
6	Tony Rominger (SUI)	Mapei–GB	148
7	Jan Ullrich (GER)	Team Telekom	131
8	Pascal Hervé (FRA)	Festina–Lotus	110
9	Peter Luttenberger (AUT)	Carrera Jeans–Tassoni	109
10	Piotr Ugrumov (LAT)	Roslotto–ZG Mobili	101

=== Young rider classification ===
Final young rider classification (1–10)
Rank	Rider	Team	Time
1	Jan Ullrich (GER)	Team Telekom	95h 58' 57"
2	Peter Luttenberger (AUT)	Carrera Jeans–Tassoni	+ 5' 26"
3	Manuel Fernández Ginés (ESP)	Mapei–GB	+ 24' 47"
4	Leonardo Piepoli (ITA)	Refin–Mobilvetta	+ 25' 55"
5	Michael Boogerd (NED)	Rabobank	+ 1h 12' 04"
6	José Luis Arrieta (ESP)	Banesto	+ 1h 12' 07"
7	Paolo Savoldelli (ITA)	Roslotto–ZG Mobili	+ 1h 13' 39"
8	Oscar Camenzind (SUI)	Panaria–Vinavil	+ 1h 23' 36"
9	Laurent Roux (FRA)	TVM–Farm Frites	+ 1h 34' 30"
10	Valentino Fois (ITA)	Panaria–Vinavil	+ 1h 44' 17"

=== Team classification ===
Final team classification (1–10)
Rank	Team	Time
1	Festina–Lotus	287h 46' 20"
2	Team Telekom	+ 15' 14"
3	Mapei–GB	+ 51' 36"
4	Roslotto–ZG Mobili	+ 1h 22' 29"
5	ONCE	+ 1h 36' 10"
6	Rabobank	+ 1h 53' 14"
7	TVM–Farm Frites	+ 2h 09' 21"
8	MG Maglificio–Technogym	+ 2h 18' 11"
9	Team Polti	+ 2h 31' 13"
10	Banesto	+ 2h 31' 20"

=== Combativity classification ===
Final combativity classification (1–10)
Rank	Rider	Team	Points
1	Richard Virenque (FRA)	Festina–Lotus	49
2	Bjarne Riis (DEN)	Team Telekom	47
3	Michele Bartoli (ITA)	MG Maglificio–Technogym	44
4	Danny Nelissen (NED)	Rabobank	34
5	Laurent Roux (FRA)	TVM–Farm Frites	33
6	Djamolidine Abdoujaparov (UZB)	Refin–Mobilvetta	31
7	Luc Leblanc (FRA)	Team Polti	28
8	Rolf Järmann (SUI)	MG Maglificio–Technogym	22
9	Neil Stephens (AUS)	ONCE	21
10	Rolf Sørensen (DEN)	Rabobank	20

== See also ==
- List of doping cases in cycling

== Bibliography ==
- Augendre, Jacques (2016). Guide historique [Historical guide] (PDF) (in French). Paris: Amaury Sport Organisation. Archived (PDF) from the original on 17 August 2016.
- Nauright, John; Parrish, Charles (2012). Sports Around the World: History, Culture, and Practice. Vol. 2. Santa Barbara, California: ABC-CLIO. ISBN 978-1-59884-300-2.
- van den Akker, Pieter (2018). Tour de France Rules and Statistics: 1903–2018. Self-published. ISBN 978-1-79398-080-9.
