= List of Danish Tour de France stage winners =

Sixteen male cyclists from Denmark have won a total of 30 Tour de France stages as of stage 4 in 2026. Bjarne Riis, Michael Rasmussen and Jonas Vingegaard have each won four stages. Mads Pedersen has won three. Rolf Sørensen, Søren Kragh Andersen and Magnus Cort have won two. Nine other Danes have won one stage.

Two Danish women, Cecilie Uttrup Ludwig and Emma Norsgaard, have won a stage in Tour de France Femmes as of 2023.

== Men ==
The first Danish stage winner was Mogens Frey in 1970. His team owner Jean de Gribaldy wanted the team captain Joaquim Agostinho to win. Agostinho actually crossed the line first but was disqualified for holding back Frey by grabbing his handlebar.

Two Danes have won the general classification, Bjarne Riis in 1996 and Jonas Vingegaard in 2022 and 2023.

Year	Stage winner	Stage	Route
1970	Mogens Frey	9	Saarlouis (West Germany) to Mulhouse
1983	Kim Andersen	12	Fleurance to Roquefort-sur-Soulzon
1985	Jørgen V. Pedersen	10	Épinal to Pontarlier
1988	Johnny Weltz	19	Limoges to Puy de Dôme
1993	Jesper Skibby	5	Avranches to Évreux
1993	Bjarne Riis	7	Péronne to Châlons-sur-Marne
1994	Bo Hamburger	8	Poitiers to Trélissac
1994	Bjarne Riis (2)	13	Bagnères-de-Bigorre to Albi
1994	Rolf Sørensen	14	Castres to Montpellier
1996	Bjarne Riis (3)	9	Le Monêtier-les-Bains to Sestriere (Italy)
1996	Rolf Sørensen (2)	13	Le Puy-en-Velay to Super Besse
1996	Bjarne Riis (4)	16	Agen to Hautacam
2003	Jakob Piil	10	Gap to Marseille
2005	Michael Rasmussen	9	Gérardmer to Mulhouse
2006	Michael Rasmussen (2)	16	Bourg-d'Oisans to La Toussuire
2007	Michael Rasmussen (3)	8	Le Grand-Bornand to Tignes
2007	Michael Rasmussen (4)	16	Orthez to Gourette–Col d'Aubisque
2009	Nicki Sørensen	12	Tonnerre to Vittel
2018	Magnus Cort	15	Millau to Carcassonne
2020	Søren Kragh Andersen	14	Clermont-Ferrand to Lyon
2020	Søren Kragh Andersen (2)	19	Bourg-en-Bresse to Champagnole
2022	Magnus Cort (2)	10	Morzine to Megève
2022	Jonas Vingegaard	11	Albertville to Col du Granon
2022	Mads Pedersen	13	Le Bourg-d'Oisans to Saint-Étienne
2022	Jonas Vingegaard (2)	18	Lourdes to Hautacam
2023	Mads Pedersen (2)	8	Libourne to Limoges
2023	Jonas Vingegaard (3)	16	Passy to Combloux
2023	Kasper Asgreen	18	Moûtiers to Bourg-en-Bresse
2024	Jonas Vingegaard (4)	11	Évaux-les-Bains to Le Lioran
2026	Mads Pedersen (3)	4	Carcassonne to Foix

== Women ==
The women's race Tour de France Femmes started in 2022.

Year	Stage winner	Stage	Route
2022	Cecilie Uttrup Ludwig	3	Reims to Épernay
2023	Emma Norsgaard	6	Albi to Blagnac

== See also ==
- Tour de France records and statistics § Stage wins per country
- Cycling in Denmark
