= Jean Nelissen =

Dutch journalist

- Born: 2 June 1936; Geleen, Netherlands
- Died: 1 September 2010 (aged 74); Maastricht, Netherlands
- Occupation(s): Sports journalist, sports commentator

Jean Nelissen (2 June 1936, Geleen, Netherlands – 1 September 2010, Maastricht, Netherlands) was a Dutch sports journalist and commentator. He was the uncle of racing cyclist Danny Nelissen.
