= Manuel Fernández Ginés =

Spanish cyclist

Personal information
- Full name: Manuel Fernández Ginés
- Born: 25 February 1971 (age 55) La Zubia

Cycling career
- Sport: Cycling
- Current team: Retired
- Discipline: Road
- Role: Rider

Professional teams
- 1993: CLAS–Cajastur
- 1994-1996: Mapei–CLAS
- 1997-1998: Banesto
- 1999-2000: Mapei–Quick-Step

Major wins
- Spanish National Road Race Championships (1996)

Manuel Fernández Ginés (born 25 February 1971 in La Zubia) is a retired Spanish cyclist. He was professional from 1993 to 2000 and won the Spanish National Road Race Championships in 1996.

== Major results ==
1992
2nd Overall Vuelta a Navarra

1993
2nd Overall Clásica de Sabiñánigo
3rd Overall Vuelta a Mallorca

1995
2nd Overall Circuito de Getxo
3rd Overall Clásica a los Puertos de Guadarrama
3rd Overall Tour of Galicia

1996
1st Road race, National Road Championships
1st Trofeo Zumaquero

1997
1st Overall Vuelta a Asturias

1st Stage 5

=== Grand Tour results ===
==== Tour de France ====
- 1996: 16th
- 1999: 49th

==== Giro d'Italia ====
- 1996: 21st

==== Vuelta a España ====
- 1994: 44th
- 1995: DNF
- 1998: 69th
- 1999: DNF
