= Cyril Saugrain =

French cyclist

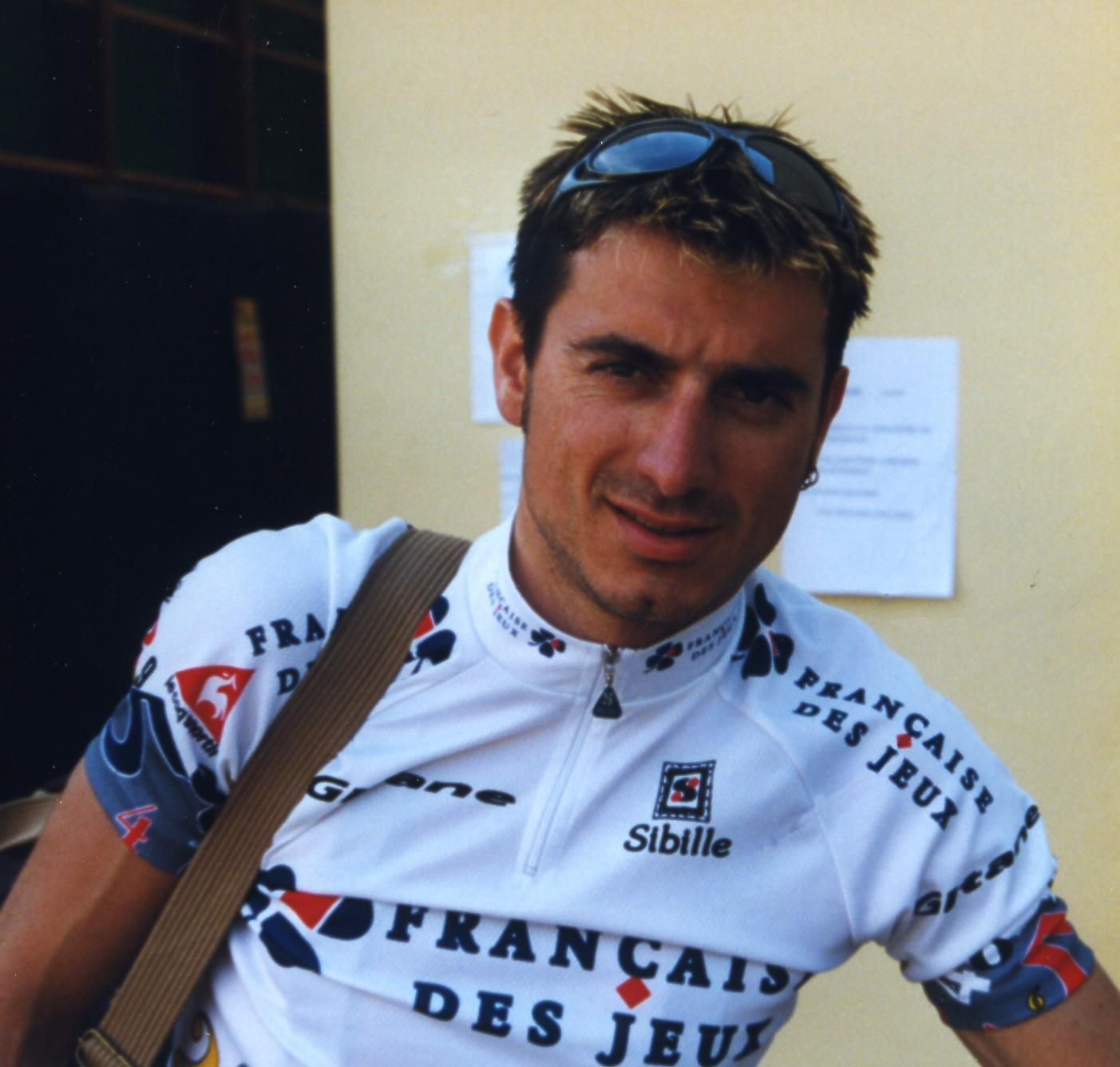

Personal information
- Full name: Cyril Saugrain
- Born: June 22, 1973 (age 53) Livry-Gargan, France
- Height: 1.70 m (5 ft 7 in)
- Weight: 62 kg (137 lb; 9 st 11 lb)

Cycling career
- Sport: Cycling
- Current team: Retired
- Discipline: Road
- Role: Rider

Major wins
- 1 stage 1996 Tour de France

Cyril Saugrain (born 22 June 1973) is a French former professional road bicycle racer, who won the 4th stage of the 1996 Tour de France. He is a consultant cyclist at the RTBF.

== Major results ==
1995
1st Stage 4 Tour du Vaucluse
1st Stage 1 Quatre Jours de l'Aisne
1st Stage 1 Tour de l'Ain
1st Aubervilliers
3rd La Côte Picarde
1996
1st Stage 4 Tour de France
1st Stage 4 Tour du Vaucluse
1st Châteauroux Classic
1997
2nd Route Adélie de Vitré
5th Trophée des Grimpeurs
1998
2nd Grand Prix de Plumelec-Morbihan
1999
1st Grand Prix de Villers-Cotterêts
2002
4th Paris–Bourges
