= Bjarne Riis =

Danish cyclist (born 1964)

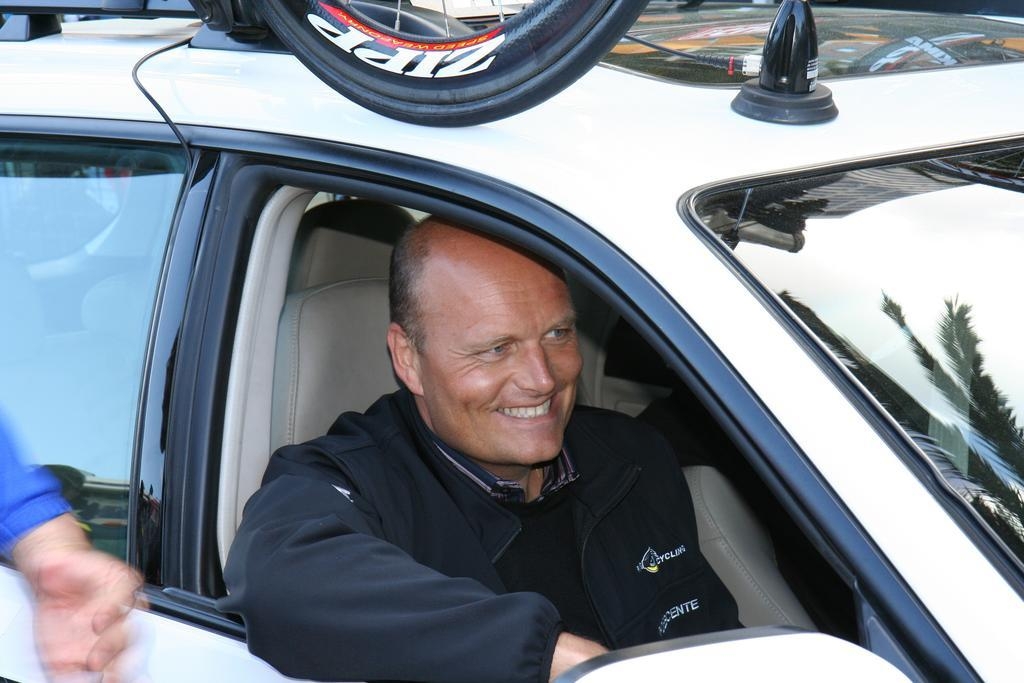
- Riis at the 2007 Tour of California.

Personal information
- Full name: Bjarne Lykkegård Riis
- Nicknames: Ørnen fra Herning (The Eagle from Herning)
- Born: 3 April 1964 (age 62) Herning, Denmark
- Height: 1.84 m (6 ft 1/2 in)
- Weight: 71 kg (157 lb; 11 st 3 lb)

Cycling career
- Sport: Cycling
- Discipline: Road
- Role: Rider (retired); Team manager
- Rider type: All-rounder

Professional teams
- 1986: Roland
- 1987: Lucas
- 1988: Toshiba–Look
- 1989: Super U–Raleigh–Fiat
- 1990–1991: Castorama
- 1992–1993: Ariostea
- 1994–1995: Gewiss–Ballan
- 1996–1999: Team Telekom

Managerial teams
- 1999–2015: home–Jack & Jones
- 2016: Team Virtu Pro–Véloconcept

Major wins
- Grand Tours Tour de France General classification (1996) 4 individual stages (1993, 1994, 1996) 2 TTT stages (1989, 1995) Giro d'Italia 2 individual stages (1989, 1993) One-day races and Classics National Road Race Championships (1992, 1995, 1996) National Time Trial Championships (1996) Amstel Gold Race (1997)

Bjarne Lykkegård Riis (Danish pronunciation: [ˈpjɑːnə ˈʁiˀs]; born 3 April 1964), nicknamed The Eagle from Herning (Danish: Ørnen fra Herning), is a Danish former professional road bicycle racer and cycling team manager. Noted for his victory in the 1996 Tour de France, where he dethroned five‑time defending champion Miguel Indurain.

Riis's other major victories include the Amstel Gold Race in 1997 and multiple Danish national road race titles, and he took stage wins at the Tour de France and Giro d'Italia. After retiring in 2000, he founded and managed Team CSC, which competed under successive sponsors as Saxo Bank, Saxo Bank–SunGard and Tinkoff-Saxo and was one of the leading squads of the 2000s and early 2010s. Following the team's sale to Russian businessman Oleg Tinkov in late 2013, Riis continued as manager until he was dismissed in March 2015 after a dispute with Tinkov.

On 25 May 2007, Riis admitted he had used EPO, growth hormone and cortisone between 1993 and 1998, including during his Tour de France victory. The Tour's organisers, ASO, initially removed him from the list of winners, but in July 2008 reinstated his 1996 result with a footnote acknowledging his doping confession, after the UCI determined that the WADA Code's then-applicable eight-year statute of limitations had expired. Speaking at a cycling conference in Copenhagen in June 2025, Riis said he was not ashamed of his doping past, calling it "part of that period and a system that we all silently accepted".

== Career ==
Born in Herning, Riis began cycling at local club Herning CK. When he was not selected for the 1984 Summer Olympics, former cyclist Kim Andersen advised Riis to start his professional career not in Italy, but in Luxembourg. His professional career started in 1986, his first result was a fifth-place finish in the GP Wallonie that year. Following a few years with no personal wins, he had yet to impress when his contract ran out in 1988.

At the 1988 Tour of European Community race, while riding for the Toshiba team, Riis and fellow Danish rider Kim Eriksen were contacted by the former Tour de France winner Laurent Fignon from the Système U team. Fignon was leading the Tour of the European Community race, but he needed a few riders to help him secure the victory. In the hope of earning a contract with Système U, Riis helped Fignon achieve the victory, and in December 1988, he moved to sports director Cyrille Guimard's Système U team as a support rider for Fignon. For the next three years, Riis rode as Fignon's eternal helper in both flat and mountainous terrain, and they became close friends. Riis helped Fignon win the 1989 Giro d'Italia, while Riis himself won his first professional victory as he secured the 9th stage of the Giro.

=== Tour de France success ===
When Fignon left Guimard in 1992, Bjarne Riis contacted fellow Danish rider Rolf Sørensen, who got him a job as a rider for the Italian team Ariostea under sporting director Giancarlo Ferretti. Riis won stage 7 of the 1993 Tour de France and also wore the polka dot jersey as leader of the mountains classification for a day. He finished 5th place overall, which was the best Danish result in Tour history at the time, bettering former World Champion Leif Mortensen's 6th-place finish in the 1971 Tour de France. Riis was ill during the 1994 Tour de France but went on a breakaway and then raced solo for the last 30 km of the day. With the sprinter teams chasing him, he placed first on the stage by just a few seconds. Riis finished 3rd at the 1995 Tour de France, the first Dane to reach the podium in Paris.

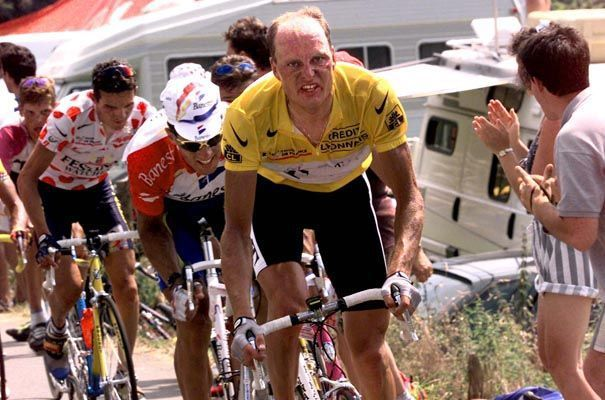
Riis attacking during the stage to Hautacam at the 1996 Tour de France

For the 1996 season, Riis was brought on to the Telekom team as team captain. Following his excellent showing in the high climbs of the 1995 Tour, Riis was confident that he was capable of winning. He asked his new teammates to support him and convinced them that if they worked for him, he could bring the yellow jersey to Team Telekom. By the start of the Tour, he was in superb condition, winning the Danish Road Racing Championship the week before the prologue. As a result of snow on both the Col de l'Iseran and the Col du Galibier, the scheduled 190 km stage 9 from Val-d'Isère to Sestriere in Italy was truncated and reduced to a 46 km sprint from Le-Monetier-les-Bains which was claimed by Riis, opening a 44-second gap over his teammate Jan Ullrich. By the Tour's end, Riis had placed first in the General classification, with a lead of 1:41 over his young teammate Ullrich. In so doing, he ended the string of five successive victories won by Tour great Miguel Indurain. The win by Riis was instrumental in turning Telekom from a second-tier cycling team, which struggled just to be invited into the 1995 Tour into one of the biggest teams in road racing. It also had a huge positive effect on the development of cycling in both Denmark and Germany, massively increasing spectator interest and participation in the sport as well.

In 1997, he placed first in the spring classic Amstel Gold Race, with a great effort, riding solo from a long way out, in pouring rain. Bjarne Riis was the favourite at the 1997 Tour de France, but instead it was his young German teammate Jan Ullrich, who won the overall competition, with Riis finishing 7th. On his way to the start at stage 2 of the 1999 Tour de Suisse, Bjarne Riis hit the curb and crashed. The sustained injuries to his elbow and knee ultimately forced him to retire in the spring of 2000 at the age of 36.

=== Doping allegations ===
In the aftermath of the performance-enhancing drugs crisis in cycling following the 1998 Tour de France, Riis acquired the nickname of Mr. 60%, a suggestion that he has used doping. The 60% is an allusion to a high hematocrit (red blood cell) level, an indication of EPO usage. It has been published, but never proven, that Riis had a hematocrit level of 56% during one test in July 1995; well above typical natural levels, as well as his published reading of 41% in the offseason earlier that year. The earliest mention of the nickname can be traced to interviews with riders of Festina in 1998–2000, who apparently suggested that if they had been doped above 50%, then Riis must have been doped to at least 60%, since he was able to win the Tour de France in 1996 ahead of the Festina rider Richard Virenque: in Willy Voet's book Breaking the Chain, he mentions that Festina's team doctor would not allow EPO to be administered if a rider's hematocrit level was near 55%. Bjarne Riis never tested positive as a rider, though no EPO test existed at that time. Reports have noted, however, that police in Italy found evidence that Riis may have been among riders treated with EPO in 1994 and 1995 by medical researchers under Professor Francesco Conconi at the University of Ferrara, which resulted in prosecutions against Conconi and also involved Michele Ferrari. Files used in the court case apparently showed fluctuations in Riis' hematocrit from 41% to 56.3%.

Speculations about Bjarne Riis's doping use was further fuelled by his ambiguous denials. When asked whether he used doping, he repeatedly stated that "I have never tested positive," a statement that falls short of an outright denial.

==== Admission ====
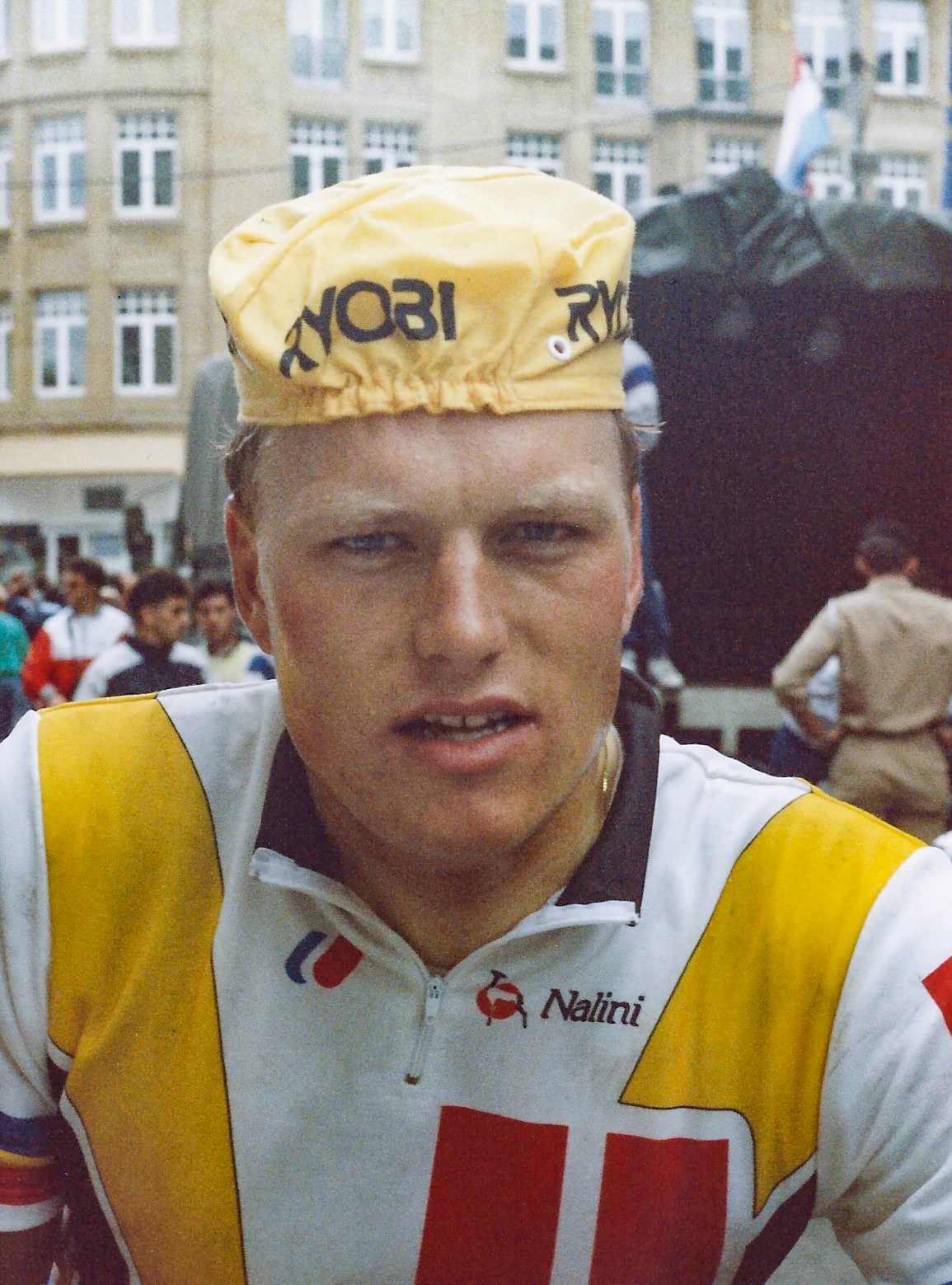
Riis with Team Système U (1989)

At the end of April 2007, former Riis' soigneur Jeff d'Hont wrote a book about the doping practices of Riis and other riders during his time in the cycling business. On 21 May 2007, Riis' former Telekom teammate Bert Dietz admitted that he had used doping during his Telekom-time. This prompted other former teammates, Christian Henn and Udo Bölts, and two former team doctors, to admit their involvement in doping. On 24 May, three other teammates Rolf Aldag, Erik Zabel and Brian Holm confessed.

Following this series of confessions, on 25 May 2007 Riis issued a press release that he also had made "mistakes" in the past, and in the following press conference confessed to taking EPO, growth hormone and cortisone for 6 years, from 1993 to 1998, including during his victory in the 1996 Tour de France. Riis said that he bought and injected the EPO himself, and team coach Walter Godefroot turned a blind eye to the drug use on the team. He denied a passage of Jeff d'Hont's book, where it is related that his hematocrit level was once tested by the team and registered 64%. He said if someone wanted to take his yellow jersey, they could do so; it meant nothing to him. Riis was removed from the official record books of the Tour de France, but in July 2008, he was written back into the books, along with additional notes about his use of doping.

The reactions on Riis's admission have been mixed. Some critics have called him a cheater, and that the results he achieved in his career were worthless. Others have labelled him as a victim of the doping culture that was rampant in professional road cycling, and have insisted that he should not be scapegoated for a wider problem.

In November 2010, Riis published a book about his career as a rider, emphasising that doping throughout the time he had competed was not considered by the peloton as "cheating", but simply as a part of the "normal preparation" for a professional rider. He described that he had started to dope only with corticosteroids in the 80s, and then, as he previously had confessed, upgraded his doping with EPO in 1993–98. Riis states the last time he doped as a rider was in July 1998. He states he quit during the 1998 Tour de France when he was nearly caught by the police. As part of the probe into the Festina doping scandal, police were on their way to search the rooms of his Telekom teammates. Riis offered the following comment on the episode: "In my room I didn't have a choice. My vials of doping products had to disappear quickly. In just a few minutes I gathered all my doses of EPO and threw them down the toilet".

=== Team manager ===
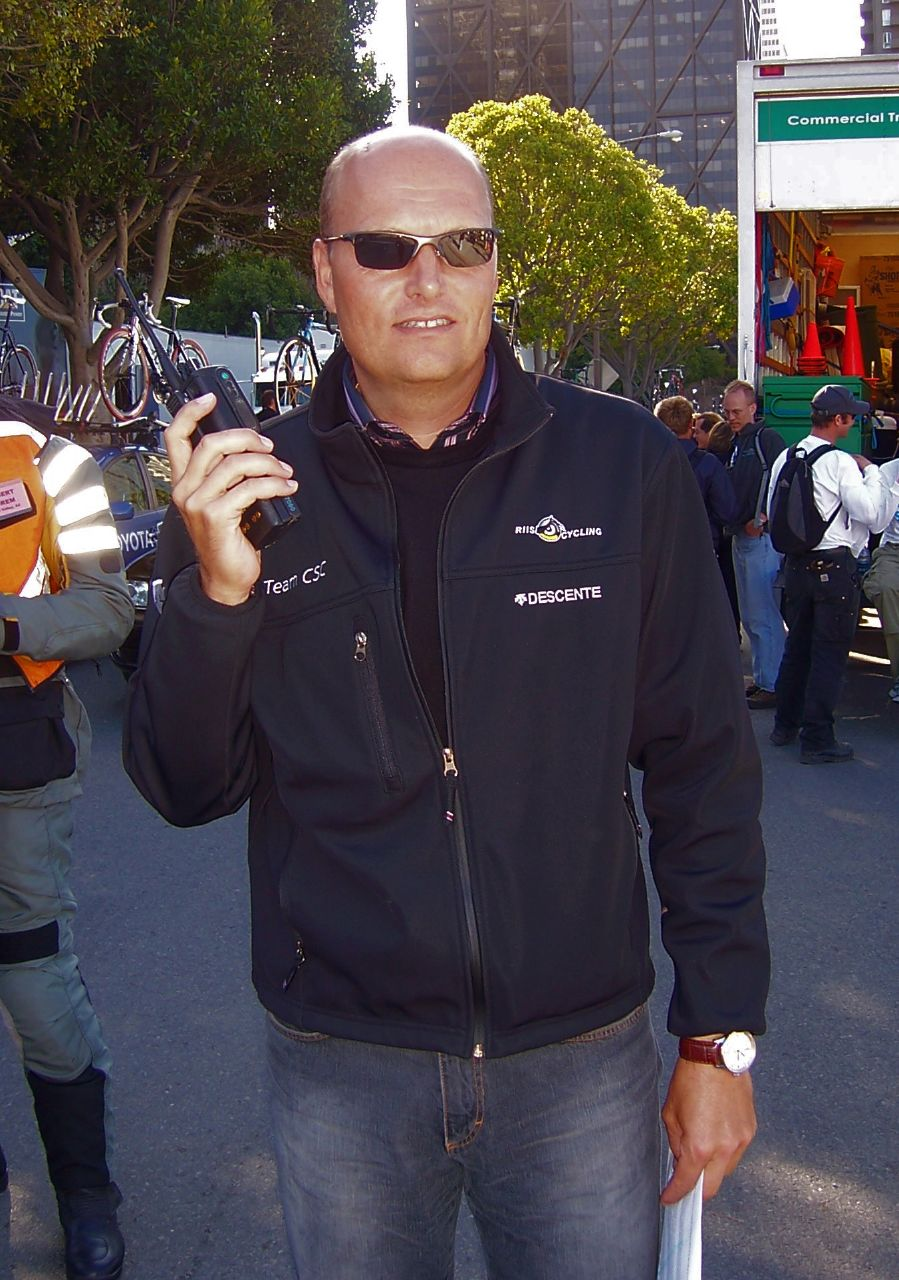
Riis as director of Team CSC (2007 Tour of California)

Following his retirement, a new life opened up. Bjarne Riis had from the start been one of the people behind the Danish cycling team home–Jack & Jones, which became the first Danish team competing in the Tour de France. Following doping allegations and suspension of Home-Jack & Jones rider Marc Streel in 1999, Home withdrew its sponsorship. Bjarne Riis bought the majority of the team through its controlling company Professional Cycling Denmark (PCD), and he became the team manager. In 2001, the team changed sponsor to CSC/World Online, then CSC/Tiscali, and in the seasons 2003 to 2007, the American IT company CSC was the sole sponsor of Team CSC. In season 2008, CSC shared the sponsorship with the Danish bank Saxo Bank, which as of season 2009 has been the sole team sponsor. The team later got the name Team Saxo Bank Sungard and is now known as Team Saxo Bank-Tinkoff Bank. Riis renamed PCD to Riis Cycling A/S in 2003. Before the 2005 season, Team CSC had financial problems, and some of the riders were asked to take a wage cut. Riis used his own money to keep the team running throughout his first years as team manager, an expenditure he later vowed never to repeat when a new sponsor deal was signed during the 2005 Tour de France.

As a team manager, his team has been involved in some doping cases, with no rider being convicted for using doping while on his team. However, in Tyler Hamilton's book, "The Secret Race," is described how Riis actively encouraged the use of doping on the CSC team. Also, Ivan Basso, who was Team CSC's 2006 Tour de France general classification contender was removed from the team prior to the beginning of the Tour according to the UCI ProTour rules due to his possible involvement in the Operación Puerto doping case, an involvement confirmed by Basso himself in April 2007. Basso's contract with Team CSC has since ended.

The story of team CSC during the 2004 Tour de France has been captured in a documentary titled "Overcoming".

His best results as a manager in Grand Tours were winning the 2006 Giro d'Italia with Ivan Basso, the 2008 and 2010 Tour de France with Carlos Sastre and Andy Schleck respectively, and the 2012 Vuelta a España with Alberto Contador.

In December 2013, it was confirmed that team sponsor Oleg Tinkov had bought the team from Riis, for a reported sum of approximately €6 million, with Riis continuing as team manager on a three-year deal worth €1 million per year. Tinkov had previously criticised Riis and Contador for their performances during 2013 via social media.

In March 2015, the team confirmed that Riis had been removed from active duty due to differences between Riis and Tinkov. Media reports had initially indicated that Riis had been suspended when he did not appear at the 2015 Milan–San Remo as planned, and that this was due to a disappointing start to the season for the team. On 29 March, it was announced that Riis had been released by the team. News reports cited the "tumultuous relationship" and "difference in character" between Riis and Tinkov as the reason for Riis's departure.

In July 2016 Riis and former Saxo Bank CEO Lars Seier announced that they had taken over the Danish UCI Continental team Team TreFor and renamed it Team Virtu Pro–Véloconcept, with the intention of it functioning as the development team for a planned UCI WorldTeam.

In January 2020 Riis was appointed as manager of the NTT Pro Cycling team.

== Career achievements ==
=== Major results ===
1984
2nd Overall Flèche du Sud

1st Stages 1 & 2

1986
5th Grand Prix de Wallonie
1988
8th Grand Prix de Wallonie
1989
1st Stage 9 Giro d'Italia
1st Stage 2 Tour de l'Avenir
1st Stage 2 (TTT) Tour de France
2nd Grand Prix de la Libération
1990
Tour de l'Avenir

1st Stages 7 & 9

6th Overall Tour de Luxembourg
10th Grand Prix d'Isbergues
1991
6th Road race, UCI Road World Championships
1992
1st Road race, National Road Championships
4th Paris–Brussels
8th Giro della Romagna
1993
1st Stage 7 Giro d'Italia
5th Overall Tour de France

1st Stage 7

9th Road race, UCI Road World Championships
9th Omloop van de Vlaamse Scheldeboorden
9th Grand Prix Eddy Merckx
1994
1st Stage 13 Tour de France
2nd GP Industria & Artigianato di Larciano
5th Züri-Metzgete
6th Overall Ronde van Nederland
6th Giro del Veneto
6th Milano–Vignola
7th Giro di Lombardia
7th Giro dell'Emilia
7th Grand Prix Eddy Merckx
9th Road race, UCI Road World Championships
1995
1st Road race, National Road Championships
1st Overall Danmark Rundt

1st Stage 3b (ITT)

2nd Circuit de l'Aulne
3rd Overall Tour de France

1st Stage 3 (TTT)

5th Grand Prix Eddy Merckx
1996
National Road Championships

1st Road race
1st Time trial

1st Overall Tour de France

1st Stages 9 & 16

1st Coppa Sabatini
1st GP Herning
2nd Grand Prix des Nations
3rd Overall Danmark Rundt
3rd Grand Prix of Aargau Canton
3rd Giro dell'Emilia
3rd Telekom Grand Prix (with Jan Ullrich)
4th Rund um den Henninger-Turm
5th Overall Grand Prix du Midi Libre
6th Classique des Alpes
9th Grand Prix Eddy Merckx
10th Road race, UCI Road World Championships
1997
1st Amstel Gold Race
1st GP Herning
1st Colliers Classic
1st Stage 4a Grand Prix Guillaume Tell
2nd Time trial, National Road Championships
2nd Rund um den Henninger-Turm
4th Overall Danmark Rundt
5th Overall Euskal Bizikleta
7th Overall Tour de France
7th Grand Prix of Aargau Canton
10th Grand Prix de Wallonie
1998
1st GP Herning
1st Stage 5 Euskal Bizikleta
5th Overall Peace Race

=== Grand Tour general classification results timeline ===
Grand Tour	1987	1988	1989	1990	1991	1992	1993	1994	1995	1996	1997	1998
Giro d'Italia	—	DNF	86	100	43	101	DNF	70	—	—	—	—
Tour de France	—	—	95	DNF	107	—	5	14	3	1	7	11
Vuelta a España	DNF	—	—	—	—	—	—	—	DNF	—	—	—

Legend
—	Did not compete
DNF	Did not finish

== See also ==
- List of Grand Tour general classification winners
- List of Danish Tour de France stage winners
- List of doping cases in cycling
- List of sportspeople sanctioned for doping offences
