= Peter Luttenberger =

Austrian cyclist

Personal information
- Full name: Peter Luttenberger
- Nickname: Lutte
- Born: 13 December 1972 (age 53) Bad Radkersburg, Austria
- Height: 1.73 m (5 ft 8 in)
- Weight: 60 kg (132 lb; 9 st 6 lb)

Cycling career
- Sport: Cycling
- Current team: Retired
- Discipline: Road
- Role: Rider

Amateur team
- 1994: Carrera Jeans (stagiare)

Professional teams
- 1995—1996: Carrera Jeans–Tassoni
- 1997—1998: Rabobank
- 1999—2000: ONCE–Deutsche Bank
- 2001—2002: Tacconi Sport–Vini Caldirola
- 2003—2006: Team CSC

Major wins
- Stage races Tour de Suisse (1996) One-day races and Classics National Road Race Championships (1993) National Time trial Championships (1998, 2006)

Peter Luttenberger (born 13 December 1972) is a retired Austrian professional road bicycle racer. He finished fifth in the General classification of the 1996 Tour de France, but he never again managed to live up to the promise of that result, with a position as 13 in 1997 and 2003 as the best later results. He was born in Bad Radkersburg. He won the Austrian National Road Race Championships in 1993. He also competed at the 1992 Summer Olympics and the 1996 Summer Olympics. He won the overall at the 1996 Tour de Suisse

== Major results ==
1993
1st National Road race Championships
1st Piccolo Giro di Lombardia
1st Coppa Città di San Daniele
1996
1st Overall Tour de Suisse

1st Stage 7

5th Overall Tour de France
7th Overall Euskal Bizikleta
1997
6th Overall Tour du Limousin
1998
1st National Time trial Championships
1st Stage 5 Tour of Austria
8th Overall Volta a la Comunitat Valenciana
8th Overall Setmana Catalana de Ciclisme
9th Overall Paris–Nice
9th Overall Tour de Suisse
1999
4th Overall Vuelta a Aragón
5th Overall Tour of the Basque Country
10th Klasika Primavera
2000
1st Stage 1 TTT Volta a Catalunya
4th Subida Urkiola
8th Overall Critérium du Dauphiné Libéré
2001
2nd National Time trial Championships
7th Overall Giro del Trentino
7th Giro dell'Appennino
10th La Flèche Wallonne
10th Milano–Torino
10th Klasika Primavera
2002
3rd Overall Tour of Austria
4th Overall Giro del Trentino
4th Overall Settimana Internazionale di Coppi e Bartali
7th Overall Tour de Suisse
8th Milano–Torino
8th Subida Urkiola
2006
1st National Time trial Championships

=== Grand Tour general classification results timeline ===
Grand Tour	1995	1996	1997	1998	1999	2000	2001	2002	2003	2004	2005
Giro d'Italia	—	—	—	—	19	—	12	—	—	—	87
Tour de France	—	5	13	—	—	21	—	DNF	13	—	—
Vuelta a España	DNF	—	DNF	—	DNF	DNF	—	81	62	85	—

Legend
—	Did not compete
DNF	Did not finish
