= Valentino Fois =

Italian cyclist

Personal information
- Born: 23 September 1973 Bergamo, Italy
- Died: 28 March 2008 (aged 34) Villa d'Alme, Italy
- Height: 1.81 m (5 ft 11 1/2 in)
- Weight: 64 kg (141 lb; 10 st 1 lb)

Cycling career
- Sport: Cycling
- Discipline: Road
- Role: Rider

Professional teams
- 1996: Panaria-Vinavil
- 1997: Mapei-GB
- 1998-1999: Vini Caldirola-Longoni Sport
- 2000: Team Colpack
- 2001: Mobilvetta Design-Formaggi Trentini
- 2002: Mercatone Uno
- 2008: Amore & Vita

Valentino Fois (23 September 1973 – 28 March 2008) was an Italian cyclist. He participated in 2 editions of the Tour de France.

== Major results ==
1995
1st Giro della Valle d'Aosta
1996
1st stage 5 Tour de Pologne
1997
3rd Italian National Road Race Championships
1999
1st Giro del Mendrisiotto
