= Danny Nelissen =

Dutch cyclist (born 1970)

Personal information
- Full name: Daniel Wilhelmus Maria Nelissen
- Born: November 10, 1970 (age 55) Sittard, Netherlands

Cycling career
- Sport: Cycling
- Current team: Retired
- Discipline: Road
- Role: Rider

Professional teams
- 1990–1992: PDM–Concorde–Ultima
- 1993–1994: TVM–Bison Kit
- 1996–1997: Rabobank
- 1998: home–Jack & Jones
Medal record
Representing Netherlands
Men's road bicycle racing
World Championships
Gold medal – first place	1995 Duitama	Amateur road race

Daniel ("Danny") Wilhelmus Maria Nelissen (born 10 November 1970 in Sittard, Netherlands) is a Dutch former professional road bicycle racer and former sports commentator at Eurosport. He won the 1995 amateur world championship and was named Dutch Sportsman of the year. He was the nephew of cycling commentator Jean Nelissen.

He started his professional career in 1990 with PDM, for which he won his first professional race, the Grand Prix de Wallonie, in 1992. In 1994, while riding for the Dutch TVM team, he developed heart rhythm impairments and returned to ride at amateur level.

The following year in Colombia he won the amateur world championship. He was the last amateur world champion, the UCI replacing the race with a youth competition in 1996. The triumph lead to Nelissen being voted as 1995 Dutch Sportsman of the year. According to Nelissen, his use of a power meter was key to his win: he claimed that he was one of the few riders "(who) had them and knew what they could do" at that time, alongside Greg LeMond and Jonathan Vaughters. All three riders shared the same coach, Adrie Van Diemen. He prepared for the race by tackling the hardest climb on the finishing circuit in a variety of ways to find the tactic which would enable him to complete the climb fastest, settling on riding it at a steady tempo. During the race he was able to use this tactic to catch up to the other riders in the winning break after being dropped by them at the start of the climb. He made his winning break just over a lap from the finish, attacking on a descent and soloing to the finish.

He was brought into the Rabobank team for two years under manager Jan Raas. In the 1996 Tour de France, he wore the polka dot jersey as leader of the mountains classification for a couple of days. Before 1998, he joined the Danish team, Team Home – Jack & Jones (later named Team CSC).

In January 1999, further heart problems brought his retirement at 28.

Danny Nelissen was the first Dutch road bicycle racer to admit the use of doping during the years 1996 and 1997. He repeated his confession on Dutch television (RTL 7, interview by Wilfred Genee, 21 Jan. 2013).

== Major results ==
1988
1st Overall Giro di Basilicata
1990
1st Prologue Olympia's Tour
1991
5th Grand Prix d'Isbergues
1992
1st Grand Prix de Wallonie
1st Omloop Mandel-Leie-Schelde
1st Stage 6 Vuelta a Aragón
2nd Overall Étoile de Bessèges
3rd Overall Euskal Bizikleta

1st Stage 4

8th Cholet-Pays de Loire
1993
1st Profronde van Heerlen
1st Stage 4 Vuelta Asturias
3rd Veenendaal–Veenendaal
4th Overall Tour de Luxembourg
1994
3rd Kampioenschap van Vlaanderen
3rd GP Stad Zottegem
1995
1st Amateur road race, UCI Road World Championships
1st Overall Olympia's Tour

1st Stages 8b & 9

1st Stage 3 Tour de Wallonie
2nd Road race, National Road Championships
1996
1st Drielandenomloop
2nd Time trial, National Road Championships
3rd Overall Teleflex Tour
7th Overall Vuelta a Murcia
1998
1st Schaal Sels
3rd Overall Hessen Rundfahrt

1st Stage 3

5th Grote Prijs Jef Scherens

=== Grand Tour general classification results timeline ===
Grand Tour	1993	1994	1995	1996	1997
Giro d'Italia	—	—	—	—	—
Tour de France	130	—	—	84	DNF
Vuelta a España	—	—	—	—	94

Awards
Preceded by Regilio Tuur	Dutch Sportsman of the Year; 1995	Succeeded by Richard Krajicek

== See also ==
- List of Dutch Olympic cyclists
