= Lac de Madine =

Lake in Grand Est, France

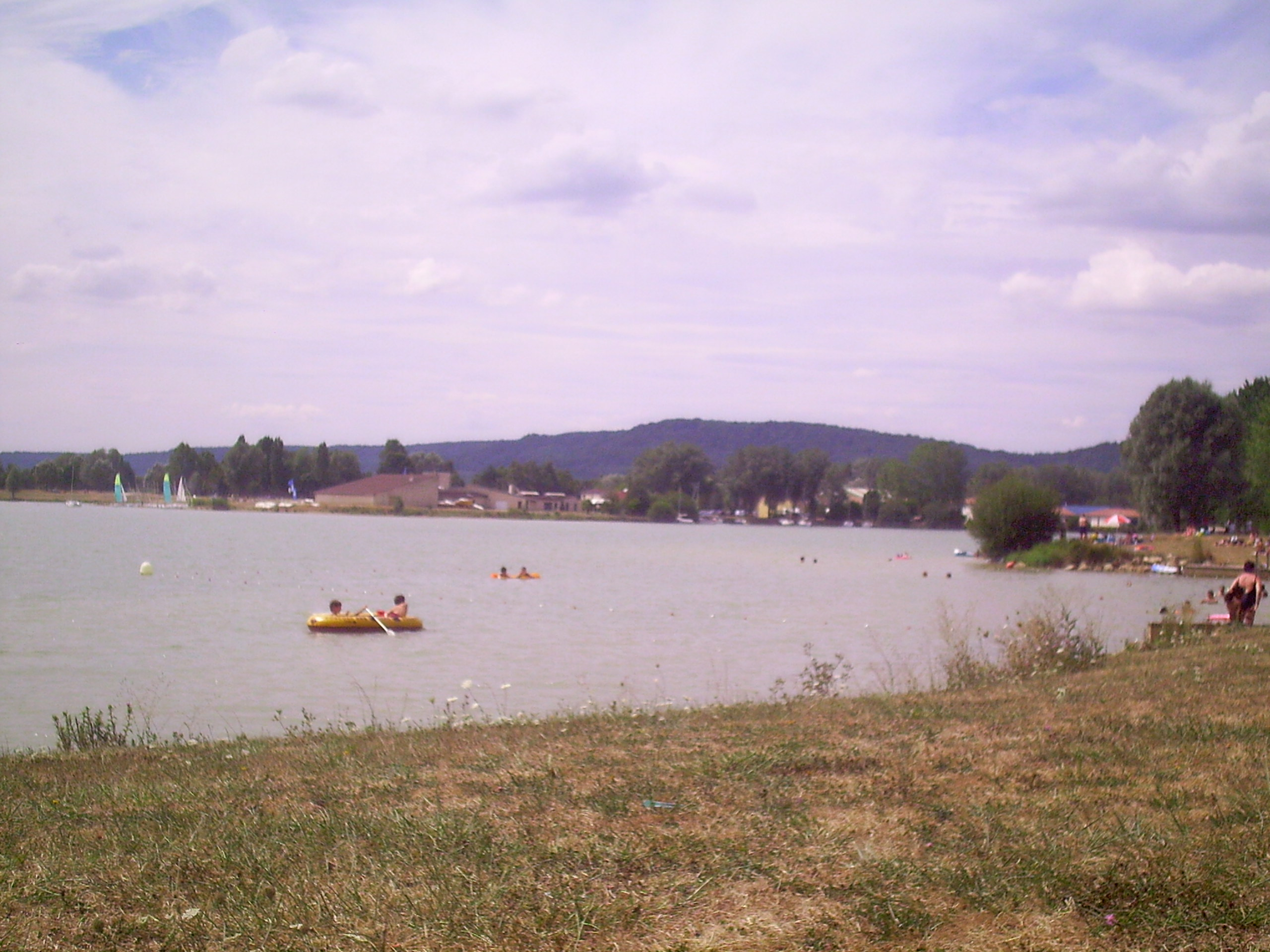

- Location within Grand Est
- Location: Meurthe-et-Moselle, Meuse
- Coordinates: 48°55′N 5°44′E
- Type: artificial
- Primary outflows: Madine
- Catchment area: 43.638 km^{2} (16.849 sq mi)
- Basin countries: France
- Surface area: 11 km^{2} (4.2 sq mi)
- Max. depth: 14 m (46 ft)
- Water volume: 35,000,000 m^{3} (1.2×10^{9} cu ft)
- Residence time: GMT + 2
- Surface elevation: 240 m (790 ft)

Lac de Madine is a lake at the border between Meurthe-et-Moselle and Meuse departments, France. At an elevation of 240 m, its surface area is 11 km^{2}.
