= Ivan Cerioli =

Italian cyclist

Personal information
- Born: 26 January 1971 (age 55) Codogno, Italy

Cycling career
- Sport: Cycling

Ivan Cerioli (born 26 January 1971) is an Italian former cyclist. He competed in the team pursuit at the 1992 Summer Olympics.
