= Laurent Roux =

French cyclist

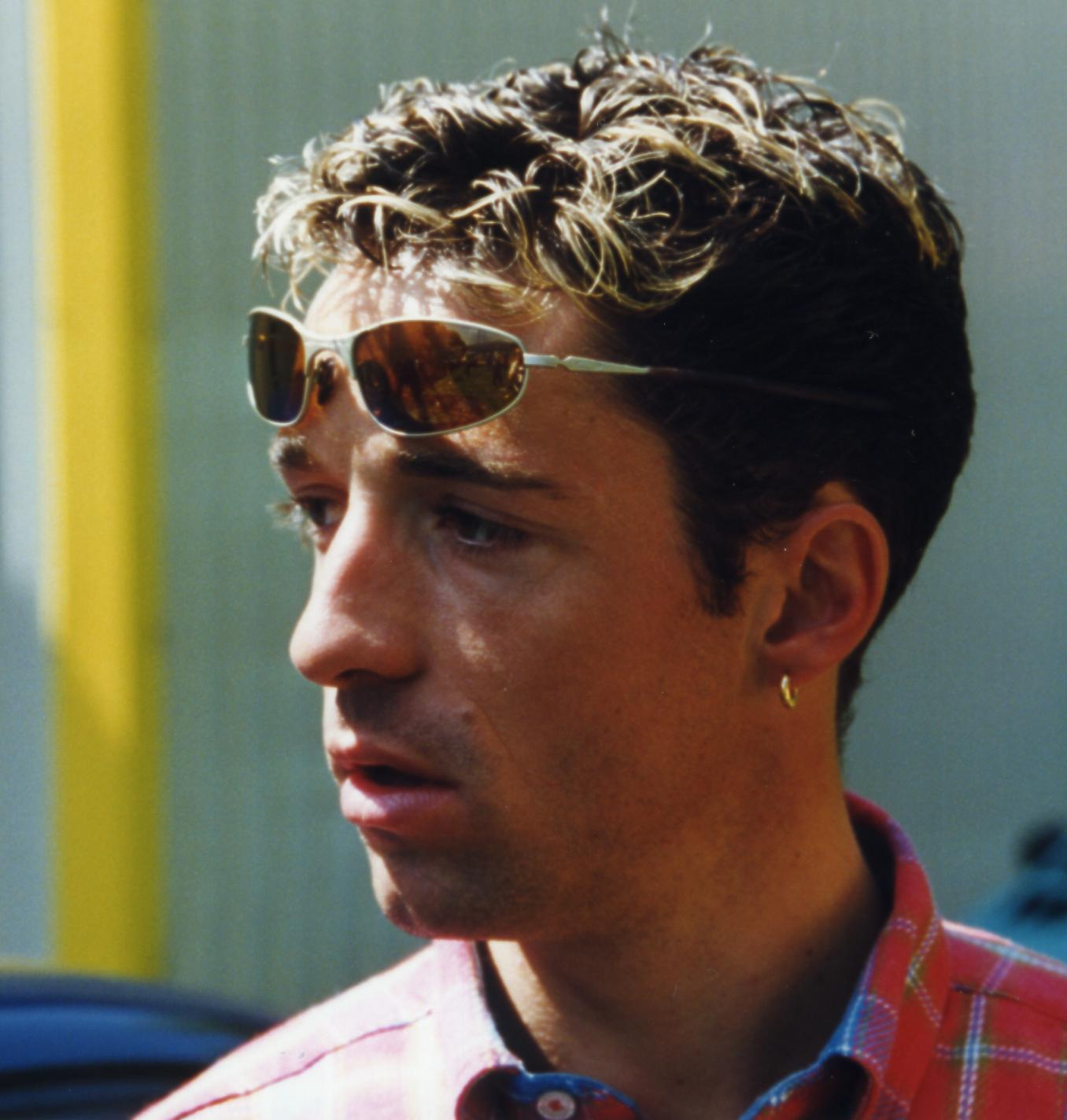
- Roux in 1999

Personal information
- Full name: Laurent Roux
- Born: 3 December 1972 (age 53) Cahors, France

Cycling career
- Sport: Cycling
- Current team: Retired
- Discipline: Road
- Role: Rider

Amateur team
- 1992: US Montauban

Professional teams
- 1994: Castorama-MaxiSport
- 1995: Castorama
- 1996: TVM
- 1997–1998: TVM-Farm Frites
- 1999: Casino
- 2000: Mobilvetta Design-Rossin
- 2001–2002: Jean Delatour

Major wins
- Giro d'Italia, 1 stage

Laurent Roux (born 3 December 1972) is a French former road bicycle racer.

== Doping ==
In 1999, he was found guilty of using amphetamines and was suspended for six months. In 2002, he was tested non-negative for amphetamines after an out of competition control. In 2006 he also confessed at a doping trial in Bordeaux that he used EPO, human growth hormone, cortisone and testosterone and sold "Pot Belge" to other riders.

== Major results ==
1996
1st, Stage 2b, Route du Sud
1997
1st, Classique des Alpes
1st, Paris–Bourges
1st, Stage 3, Route du Sud
1st, Overall, Tour de l'Avenir
1998
1st, Stage 13, Giro d'Italia
1999
1st, Trophée des Grimpeurs
1st, Stage 4, Paris–Nice
2001
1st, Stage 2, Critérium du Dauphiné Libéré
1st, Stage 3, Route du Sud

== Goujounac ==
His father, Jacques Roux (1948-2021), was mayor of Goujounac.

== See also ==
- List of doping cases in cycling
