= Max van Heeswijk =

Dutch cyclist (born 1973)

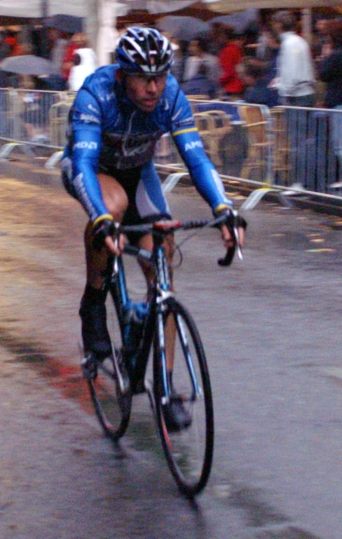

Personal information
- Full name: Max Lambert Peter van Heeswijk
- Born: 2 March 1973 (age 53) Hoensbroek, the Netherlands
- Height: 1.80 m (5 ft 11 in)
- Weight: 73 kg (161 lb)

Cycling career
- Sport: Cycling
- Discipline: Road
- Role: Rider
- Rider type: Sprinter

Amateur team
- 1994: Motorola (stagiaire)

Professional teams
- 1995–1996: Motorola
- 1997–1998: Rabobank
- 1999–2000: Mapei–Quick-Step
- 2001–2002: Domo–Farm Frites–Latexco
- 2003–2006: U.S. Postal Service
- 2007: Rabobank
- 2008: Willems Verandas

Major wins
- Grand Tours Vuelta a España 2 individual stages (1997, 2005) One-day races and Classics Hel van het Mergelland (1995) Nokere Koerse (2004) Paris-Brussels (2000)

Max Lambert Peter van Heeswijk (born 2 March 1973 in Hoensbroek, Limburg) is a Dutch retired professional road racing cyclist. He finished 15th road race at the 2000 Summer Olympics and 17th in the road race at the 2004 Summer Olympics.

== Career achievements ==
=== Major results ===
1992
1st Omloop Alblasserwaard
1993
2nd Overall Sachsen-Tour
2nd Ronde van Limburg
1994
1st Stages 2, 12, 13 & 15 Commonwealth Bank Classic
1st Stage 1 Teleflex Tour
2nd Ronde van Vlaanderen U23
1995
1st Hel van het Mergelland
1st Stages 2 & 4 Tour of Galicia
1st Stage 3 Tour de Luxembourg
1st Stage 3 Niederösterreich Rundfahrt
9th Paris–Brussels
1996
1st Stage 2 Tour of the Netherlands
1st Stage 4 Tour of Galicia
3rd Overall Tour of Sweden
1997
1st Stage 22 Vuelta a España
2nd Clásica de Almería
9th GP Rik Van Steenbergen
1998
1st Profronde van Heerlen
1st Stage 3 Tour of Austria
1st Stage 4 Vuelta a Andalucía
3rd Trofeo Luis Puig
4th Omloop Het Volk
6th Pari–Tours
9th Rund um den Henninger Turm
9th Veenendaal–Veenendaal
1999
1st GP de la Ville de Rennes
1st Stage 5 Tour Méditerranéen
2nd Paris–Camembert
3rd Route Adélie
6th Veenendaal–Veenendaal
2000
1st Paris–Brussels
1st Stage 1 Hessen Rundfahrt
1st Stage 6 Tour of the Netherlands
1st Stage 5 Niedersachsen-Rundfahrt
1st Stages 1 & 2 Volta ao Distrito de Santarém
3rd GP de la Ville de Rennes
7th Grote Prijs Jef Scherens
10th E3 Prijs Vlaanderen
2001
1st Stage 2 Volta a Catalunya
8th GP Rudy Dhaenens
9th Overall Guldensporentweedaagse
2002
1st Stage 2 Route du Sud
3rd Road race, National Road Championships
6th Veenendaal–Veenendaal
7th Sparkassen Giro Bochum
8th Overall Circuit Franco-Belge
9th Paris–Roubaix
2003
1st Stage 4 Tour de l'Ain
2nd Omloop Het Volk
3rd Classic Haribo
2nd Nationale Sluitingprijs
3rd Road race, National Road Championships
3rd Dwars door Vlaanderen
9th Gent–Wevelgem
10th E3 Prijs Vlaanderen
2004
1st Stage 6 Volta a Catalunya
Tour of the Netherlands

1st Stages 1 & 2
1st Points classification

Vuelta a Andalucía

1st Stages 2 & 4
1st Points classification

1st Stages 1 & 3 Vuelta a Murcia
1st Nokere Koerse
1st Nationale Sluitingprijs
1st Wachovia Invitational
3rd Overall Tour of Belgium

1st Stage 3

5th Milan–San Remo
5th Overall Danmark Rundt

1st Points classification

6th Overall Four Days of Dunkirk

1st Stage 6

Held after Stage 2 Vuelta a España
2005
Vuelta a España

1st Stage 7
Held after Stages 1 & 2

1st Stages 1 & 5 Eneco Tour of Benelux
3rd Road race, National Road Championships
4th Nationale Sluitingprijs
5th Trofeo Luis Puig
8th Omloop Het Volk
2006
1st Stage 1 Tour of Poland
3rd Veenendaal–Veenendaal
3rd Overall Tour of Belgium
2007
1st Stage 3 Vuelta a Andalucía
7th Gent–Wevelgem

=== Grand Tour general classification results timeline ===
Grand Tour	1996	1997	1998	1999	2000	2001	2002	2003	2004	2005	2006	2007
Giro d'Italia	—	—	—	DNF	—	—	—	—	—	—	—	DNF
Tour de France	—	—	—	—	103	134	—	—	—	—	—	—
Vuelta a España	DNF	83	94	—	—	—	—	139	DNF	DNF	—	—

Legend
DSQ	Disqualified
DNF	Did not finish

== See also ==
- List of Dutch Olympic cyclists
