= 1998 Tour of Flanders =

Race details
- Dates: 5 April 1998
- Stages: 1
- Distance: 277 km (172.1 mi)
- Winning time: 6h 50' 02"

Results
	Winner	Johan Museeuw (BEL)	(Mapei-Bricobi)
	Second	Stefano Zanini (ITA)	(Mapei-Bricobi)
	Third	Andrei Tchmil (BEL)	(Lotto-Mobistar)

The 82nd running of the Tour of Flanders cycling race in Belgium was held on Sunday 5 April 1998. Belgian Johan Museeuw won his third victory in the monument classic. The race started in Bruges for the first time and finished in Meerbeke (Ninove).

== Course ==
Johan Museeuw broke clear from a select group on Tenbosse, a climb in Brakel at 26 km from the finish.

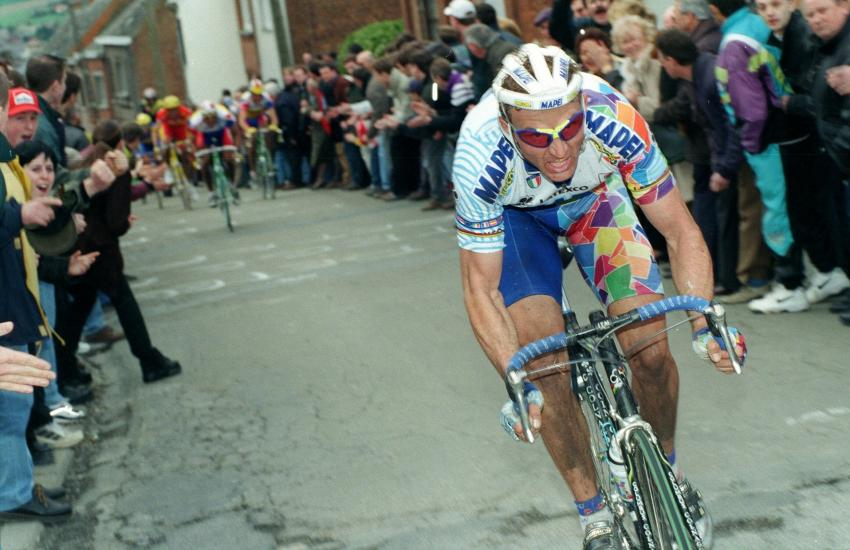
Decisive attack of Museeuw at Tenbosse.

Peter Van Petegem, realizing the danger, counterattacked, but was caught again. Museeuw powered on over the Muur and Bosberg to the finish, while his Mapei team controlled the race with three riders in the pursuit group. His team mate Zanini won the sprint for second place before Andrei Tchmil. Museeuw became the fourth rider to win the Tour of Flanders three times, equalling the race record of Achiel Buysse, Fiorenzo Magni and Eric Leman.

== Climbs ==
There were fifteen categorized climbs:

- Den Ast
- Kattenberg
- Achterberg
- Molenberg
- Kluisberg
- Knokteberg
- Oude Kwaremont
- Paterberg
- Kortekeer
- Taaienberg
- Eikenberg
- Berendries
- Tenbosse
- Muur-Kapelmuur
- Bosberg

== Results ==
	Cyclist	Team	Time
1	Johan Museeuw (BEL)	Mapei–Bricobi	6h 50' 02"
2	Stefano Zanini (ITA)	Mapei–Bricobi	+ 43"
3	Andrei Tchmil (BEL)	Lotto–Mobistar	s.t.
4	Emmanuel Magnien (FRA)	Française des Jeux	s.t.
5	Peter Van Petegem (BEL)	TVM–Farm Frites	s.t.
6	Michele Bartoli (ITA)	ASICS	s.t.
7	Viatcheslav Ekimov (RUS)	U.S. Postal Service	s.t.
8	Franco Ballerini (ITA)	Mapei–Bricobi	s.t.
9	Gianluca Bortolami (ITA)	Festina–Lotus	s.t.
10	Wilfried Peeters (BEL)	Mapei–Bricobi	s.t.
