= 1998 E3 Prijs Vlaanderen =

1998 E3 Harelbeke
Race details
- Dates: 28 March 1998
- Stages: 1
- Distance: 201 km (125 mi)
- Winning time: 4h 48' 00"

Results
	Winner	Johan Museeuw (BEL)	(TVM–Farm Frites)
	Second	Michele Bartoli (ITA)	(Asics–CGA)
	Third	Mirko Celestino (ITA)	(Team Polti)

The 1998 E3 Harelbeke was the 41st edition of the E3 Harelbeke cycle race and was held on 28 March 1998. The race started and finished in Harelbeke. The race was won by Johan Museeuw of the TVM team.

== General classification ==
Final general classification

Rank	Rider	Team	Time
1	Johan Museeuw (BEL)	TVM–Farm Frites	4h 48' 00"
2	Michele Bartoli (ITA)	Asics–CGA	+ 0"
3	Mirko Celestino (ITA)	Team Polti	+ 0"
4	Ludo Dierckxsens (BEL)	Lotto–Mobistar	+ 0"
5	Servais Knaven (NED)	TVM–Farm Frites	+ 0"
6	Tristan Hoffman (NED)	TVM–Farm Frites	+ 1' 02"
7	Dario Pieri (ITA)	Scrigno–Gaerne	+ 1' 02"
8	Stefano Dante (ITA)	Vini Caldirola	+ 1' 02"
9	Andrei Tchmil (BEL)	Lotto–Mobistar	+ 1' 02"
10	Wilfried Peeters (BEL)	Mapei–Bricobi	+ 1' 02"
