= Patrick Lefevere =

Belgian road bicycle racer

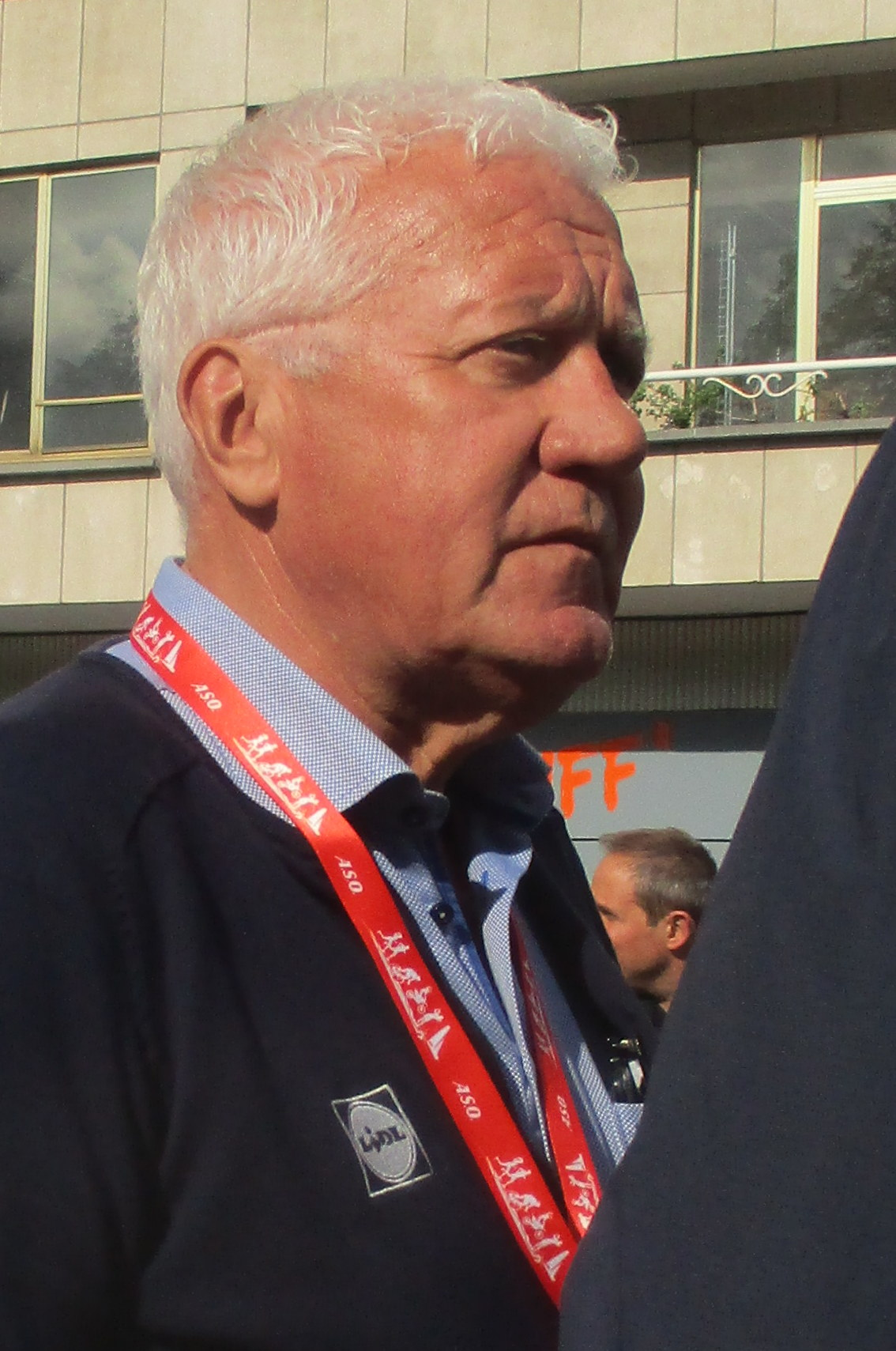
- Lefevre at the 2019 Liège–Bastogne–Liège finish

Personal information
- Full name: Patrick Lefevere
- Born: 6 January 1955 (age 71) Moorslede, Flanders, Belgium

Cycling career
- Sport: Cycling
- Current team: Soudal–Quick-Step
- Discipline: Road
- Role: Rider (retired); General manager

Professional teams
- 1976–1977: Ebo-Cinzia
- 1978–1979: Marc Zeepcentrale–Superia

Managerial teams
- 1980: Marc–Carlos–V.R.D.–Woningbouw
- 1981–1982: Capri Sonne–Koga Miyata
- 1985–1987: Lotto
- 1988: TVM–Van Schilt
- 1989–1991: Domex–Weinmann
- 1991–1994: GB-MG Maglificio
- 1995–2000: Mapei–GB–Latexco
- 2001–2002: Domo–Farm Frites–Latexco
- 2003–2024: Quick-Step–Davitamon

Major wins
- Grand Tours Vuelta a España 1 individual stage (1978) Single-day races and Classics Kuurne–Brussels–Kuurne (1978)

Patrick Lefevere (born 6 January 1955) is a Belgian retired professional cyclist, who formerly served as the general manager of UCI WorldTeam Soudal–Quick-Step. The outspoken Lefevre was the driving force behind one of the most successful cycling teams in the world for more than 20 years.

Under Lefevere's leadership, the team celebrated almost a thousand victories, including 22 Monuments, 124 stages in the Grand Tours Tour de France, Giro d'Italia and Vuelta a España and 19 world titles.

According to the ranking site Cycling Ranking he is the most successful cycling manager in history.

== Career ==
Lefevere is from Flanders, the Dutch-speaking region of the north and was a professional racer from 1976 to 1979, winning Kuurne–Brussels–Kuurne and the fourth stage in the Vuelta a España, both in 1978.

When his sports career ended, Lefevere began a new enterprise as a directeur sportif (team coach). In 1980, he was directeur sportif at Marc Superia and then spent time at Capri Sonne (1981–1982). From 1985 to 1987, he was with Lotto; in 1988 he joined Tvm and from 1989 until 1991 he was with Weinnman.

From 1991 to 1994, Lefevere was one of the orchestrators behind team MG-GB, with riders such as Franco Ballerini and Mario Cipollini.

Lefevere became directeur sportif of Mapei in 1995, a team which was known for its success in one-day races. Riders included Johan Museeuw and Michele Bartoli. In 2001, Lefevere returned to Belgium and created Domo-Farm Frites, with which he won several races, including two Paris–Roubaix (Knaven, Museeuw).

In 2001, Lefevere was declared cancer-free after being diagnosed with a pancreatic tumor in September 2000. A few months later, he resumed his role in Mapei.

In July 2002, after the Mapei team announced it was withdrawing from racing, Lefevere joined with the owners of Quick-Step, Frans De Cock, and the head of Davitamon, Marc Coucke, to announce the founding of team Quick-Step–Davitamon.

The team changed denomination several times but always had Quick-Step as its primary sponsor. The formation became a point of reference in one-day races thanks to victories by Paolo Bettini, twice World Champion, Olympic Champion and record victory holder in the Classics, along with Tom Boonen, who made his mark more than a few times at the Paris–Roubaix and in the Tour of Flanders, won a World Championship and took home the green jersey in the 2007 Tour. In the early years of 2000, the team could also count on Richard Virenque who, as part of the team, became the record-man for victories when it came to the polka dot jersey for best climber (7 times).

In October 2010, Lefevere formed a joint venture with the Czech businessman Zdeněk Bakala, who became the owner of the team. After a transitional 2011, in 2012 the team became Omega Pharma–Quick-Step, with Lefevere as CEO.

In 2012, the team won 60 official victories, including Paris–Roubaix, the Tour of Flanders and the first edition of the World Championship Team Time Trials, 9 national titles, and the World Championship Time Trial with Tony Martin.

In 2013, with the arrival of Mark Cavendish, the team had more than 50 victories to its name, including five stages at the Giro d’Italia and four stages at the Tour de France.

In 2014, Michał Kwiatkowski of Omega Pharma–Quick-Step won the rainbow jersey at the 2014 UCI World Road Race Championships in Ponferrada, Spain.

On December 10, 2024, Lefevre announced that he would step down as director of the successful cycling team Soudal Quick-Step later that month. He will be succeeded by Jurgen Foré.

== Major results ==
1975
1st Stage 4 Olympia's Tour
1976
1st Stage 6a Vuelta Ciclista a la Comunidad Valenciana
5th Le Samyn
9th Brussel-Ingooigem
1977
2nd GP Victor Standaert
8th Overall Ronde van Nederland
10th Dwars door België
1978
1st Kuurne-Brussels-Kuurne
1st Stage 4 Vuelta a España
6th Overall Tour Méditerranéen Cycliste Professionnel
1979
4th Le Samyn
8th GP du Tournaisis
