= 1998 Scheldeprijs =

Race details
- Dates: 22 April 1998
- Stages: 1
- Distance: 203 km (126.1 mi)
- Winning time: 4h 19' 19"

Results
	Winner	Servais Knaven (NED)	(TVM–Farm Frites)
	Second	Léon van Bon (NED)	(Rabobank)
	Third	Bart Leysen (BEL)	(Mapei–Bricobi)

The 1998 Scheldeprijs was the 85th edition of the Scheldeprijs cycle race and was held on 22 April 1998. The race was won by Servais Knaven of the TVM team.

== General classification ==
Final general classification

Rank	Rider	Team	Time
1	Servais Knaven (NED)	TVM–Farm Frites	4h 19' 19"
2	Léon van Bon (NED)	Rabobank	+ 23"
3	Bart Leysen (BEL)	Mapei–Bricobi	+ 23"
4	Juris Silovs (LAT)	home–Jack & Jones	+ 29"
5	Martin van Steen (NED)	Team Nürnberger	+ 1' 06"
6	Wim Omloop (BEL)	Spar–RDM	+ 1' 30"
7	Viatcheslav Ekimov (RUS)	U.S. Postal Service	+ 4' 54"
8	Kurt Van De Wouwer (BEL)	Lotto–Mobistar	+ 4' 56"
9	Christophe Agnolutto (FRA)	Casino–Ag2r	+ 4' 56"
10	Dario Pieri (ITA)	Scrigno–Gaerne	+ 4' 56"
