= 1999 Brabantse Pijl =

Race details
- Dates: 28 March 1999
- Stages: 1
- Distance: 194 km (120.5 mi)
- Winning time: 4h 43' 15"

Results
	Winner	Michele Bartoli (ITA)
	Second	Michael Boogerd (NED)
	Third	Daniele Nardello (ITA)

The 1999 Brabantse Pijl was the 39th edition of the Brabantse Pijl cycle race and was held on 28 March 1999. The race started and finished in Alsemberg. The race was won by Michele Bartoli.

== General classification ==
Final general classification

Rank	Rider	Time
1	Michele Bartoli (ITA)	4h 43' 15"
2	Michael Boogerd (NED)	+ 2"
3	Daniele Nardello (ITA)	+ 13"
4	Johan Museeuw (BEL)	+ 50"
5	Guido Trenti (USA)	+ 56"
6	Erwin Thijs (BEL)	+ 1' 00"
7	Matteo Tosatto (ITA)	s.t.
8	Ludo Dierckxsens (BEL)	s.t.
9	Martin van Steen (NED)	s.t.
10	Patrick Jonker (AUS)	s.t.
