= 2001 Paris–Roubaix =

Race details
- Dates: April 15, 2001
- Stages: 1
- Distance: 254.5 km (158.1 mi)
- Winning time: 6h 45' 00"

Results
| | Winner | Servais Knaven (NED) | (Domo–Farm Frites–Latexco) |
| | Second | Johan Museeuw (BEL) | (Domo–Farm Frites–Latexco) |
| | Third | Romāns Vainšteins (LAT) | (Domo–Farm Frites–Latexco) |

The 2001 Paris–Roubaix was the 99th running of the Paris–Roubaix single-day cycling race, often known as the Hell of the North. It was held on 15 April 2001 over a distance of 254.5 kilometres (158.1 miles). These are the results for the 2001 edition of the Paris–Roubaix cycling classic, in which Servais Knaven won and Domo-Farm Frites team took all positions in the podium.

== Results ==
15-04-2001: Compiègne-Roubaix, 254.5 km

Results (1–10)
| | Cyclist | Team | Time |
|---|---|---|---|
| 1 | Servais Knaven (NED) | Domo–Farm Frites–Latexco | 6h 45' 00" |
| 2 | Johan Museeuw (BEL) | Domo–Farm Frites–Latexco | + 34" |
| 3 | Romāns Vainšteins (LAT) | Domo–Farm Frites–Latexco | + 41" |
| 4 | George Hincapie (USA) | U.S. Postal Service | + 41" |
| 5 | Wilfried Peeters (BEL) | Domo–Farm Frites–Latexco | + 41" |
| 6 | Ludo Dierckxsens (BEL) | Lampre–Daikin | + 41" |
| 7 | Steffen Wesemann (GER) | Team Telekom | + 41" |
| 8 | Andrei Tchmil (BEL) | Lotto–Adecco | + 2' 35" |
| 9 | Chris Peers (BEL) | Cofidis | + 2' 35" |
| 10 | Rolf Sørensen (DEN) | CSC–Tiscali | + 2' 59" |
