= Martin van Steen =

Dutch bicycle racer (born 1969)

Personal information
- Born: 8 November 1969 (age 56) Oosterhout, Netherlands

Cycling career
- Sport: Cycling
- Current team: Retired
- Discipline: Road
- Role: Rider
- Rider type: Sprinter

Amateur team
- 1990–1993: Koga–Miyata

Professional teams
- 1993–1996: TVM–Bison Kit
- 1997–1998: Team Nürnberger
- 1999–2000: TVM–Farm Frites
- 2001: BankGiroLoterij
- 2002–2003: Van Hemert Groep

Martin van Steen (born 8 November 1969) is a Dutch former road cyclist, who competed as a professional from 1993 to 2003.

== Major results ==
1990
1st Grand Prix de Waregem
2nd Romsée–Stavelot–Romsée
1991
Teleflex Tour

1st Stages 4 & 6

1st Stage 5b Circuit Franco-Belge
3rd Omloop Houtse Linies
1992
1st Overall Teleflex Tour

1st Stage 3

1st Hel van het Mergelland
1st Stage 5 Tour de Liège
2nd Overall Tour du Hainaut

1st Stage 5

3rd Ronde van Noord-Holland
3rd Seraing-Aachen-Seraing
1993
1st Ronde van Overijssel
1st Stage 4 Milk Race
3rd Hasselt–Spa–Hasselt
7th Paris–Tours
1994
8th Binche–Tournai–Binche
9th Kuurne–Brussels–Kuurne
10th Paris–Tours
10th Classic Haribo
1995
10th Omloop van het Houtland
1996
4th Nationale Sluitingprijs
5th Omloop van het Waasland
7th Le Samyn
1997
3rd PWZ Zuidenveld Tour
4th Kampioenschap van Vlaanderen
4th Ronde van Overijssel
8th Overall Circuit Franco-Belge
8th Overall Olympia's Tour
1998
3rd Omloop der Kempen
4th Rund um den Flughafen Köln-Bonn
5th Scheldeprijs
7th Le Samyn
1999
2nd Ronde van Drenthe
9th Brabantse Pijl
2000
3rd Dwars door Gendringen
6th Schaal Sels
8th Grand Prix de Denain
2001
1st Omloop van het Waasland
4th GP Rudy Dhaenens
5th Nationale Sluitingprijs
7th Dwars door Gendringen
7th Veenendaal–Veenendaal
9th Omloop van het Houtland
10th Schaal Sels
2002
1st Stage 2 Tour de Liège
5th Road race, National Road Championships
5th ZLM Tour
5th GP Stad Vilvoorde
6th Dwars door Gendringen
8th Omloop van het Waasland
9th GP Rudy Dhaenens
2003
5th Beverbeek Classic
