= Cycling at the 2004 Summer Olympics – Men's individual road race =

Men's cycling road race at the Games of the XXVIII Olympiad
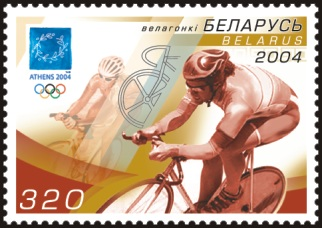
- Belarus stamp commemorating 2004 Olympic cycling
- Venue: Athens
- Date: 14 August 2004
- Competitors: 144 from 43 nations
- Winning time: 5:41:44

Medalists
1st place, gold medalist(s)		Paolo Bettini	Italy
2nd place, silver medalist(s)		Sérgio Paulinho	Portugal
3rd place, bronze medalist(s)		Axel Merckx	Belgium

The men's individual road race was a cycling event at the 2004 Summer Olympics. It was held on 14 August 2004. There were 144 competitors from 43 nations. The maximum number of cyclists per nation had been set at five since professionals were allowed in 1996. The event was won by Paolo Bettini of Italy, the nation's first victory in the men's individual road race since 1992 and fifth overall (three more than any other nation). Sérgio Paulinho's silver was Portugal's first medal in the event. Belgium earned its first medal in the men's road race since 1964 with Axel Merckx's bronze.

== Summary ==
In a race that showed numerous break away attempts, it wasn't until Paolo Bettini and Sérgio Paulinho broke away from the group with a couple of laps remaining and opened up a comfortable gap on the final lap that an idea of the medal positions could be gained. With the peloton giving up the chase of the leaders, Axel Merckx broke away to open up a sufficient gap for him to take bronze. Bettini out sprinted Paulinho for the gold, finishing in a time of 5 hours 41 minutes and 44 seconds. Among the other pre-race favourites, World Champion Igor Astarloa of Spain crashed on the opening lap, and 2000 Olympic road race champion Jan Ullrich finished among the peloton in 19th place. A number of other top names in the field, including Germany's Andreas Klöden and Russia's Viatcheslav Ekimov, pulled out before the end of the race, presumably with the Time Trial race, to be held four days later, in mind.

== Background ==
This was the 17th appearance of the event, previously held in 1896 and then at every Summer Olympics since 1936. It replaced the individual time trial event that had been held from 1912 to 1932; the time trial had been re-introduced in 1996 alongside the road race. Of the top 10 cyclists from 2000, all three medalists plus three more cyclists returned: gold medalist Jan Ullrich of Germany, silver medalist Alexander Vinokourov of Kazakhstan, bronze medalist Andreas Klöden of Germany, sixth-place finisher Frank Høj of Denmark, eighth-place finisher George Hincapie of the United States, and ninth-place finisher Paolo Bettini of Italy. Lance Armstrong, having just won his sixth consecutive Tour de France, did not compete. Reigning world champion Igor Astarloa of Spain did compete.

Serbia and Montenegro made its debut in the men's individual road race. Great Britain made its 17th appearance in the event, the only nation to have competed in each appearance to date.

== Competition format and course ==
The mass-start race was on a 211.2 kilometre course in Athens' Plateia Kozia. Using a city-streets course, "[r]ather than riding in the hilly country outside of Athens", resulted in a "relatively flat course" that did not challenge the professional peloton.

== Schedule ==
All times are Greece Standard Time (UTC+2)

Date	Time	Round
Saturday, 14 August 2004	12:45	Final

== Results ==
There were 75 finishers, with three (plus one non-finisher) later disqualified for doping.

Rank	Cyclist	Nation	Time
1st place, gold medalist(s)	Paolo Bettini	Italy	5h 41′ 44″
2nd place, silver medalist(s)	Sérgio Paulinho	Portugal	5h 41′ 45″
3rd place, bronze medalist(s)	Axel Merckx	Belgium	5h 41′ 52″
4	Erik Zabel	Germany	5h 41′ 56″
5	Andrej Hauptman	Slovenia	5h 41′ 56″
6	Kim Kirchen	Luxembourg	5h 41′ 56″
7	Roger Hammond	Great Britain	5h 41′ 56″
8	Frank Høj	Denmark	5h 41′ 56″
9	Kurt Asle Arvesen	Norway	5h 41′ 56″
10	Alexandr Kolobnev	Russia	5h 41′ 56″
11	Robbie McEwen	Australia	5h 41′ 56″
12	Markus Zberg	Switzerland	5h 41′ 56″
13	Ciarán Power	Ireland	5h 41′ 56″
14	Marcus Ljungqvist	Sweden	5h 41′ 56″
15	Julian Dean	New Zealand	5h 41′ 56″
16	Fränk Schleck	Luxembourg	5h 41′ 56″
17	Max van Heeswijk	Netherlands	5h 41′ 56″
DPG	Tyler Hamilton	United States	~~5h 41′ 56″~~
19	Jan Ullrich	Germany	5h 41′ 56″
20	Thomas Voeckler	France	5h 41′ 56″
21	Serhiy Honchar	Ukraine	5h 41′ 56″
22	Georg Totschnig	Austria	5h 41′ 56″
23	Kyrylo Pospyeyev	Ukraine	5h 41′ 56″
DPG	George Hincapie	United States	~~5h 41′ 56″~~
25	Bo Hamburger	Denmark	5h 41′ 56″
26	Tadej Valjavec	Slovenia	5h 41′ 56″
27	Nuno Ribeiro	Portugal	5h 41′ 56″
28	Bobby Julich	United States	5h 41′ 56″
29	Martin Elmiger	Switzerland	5h 41′ 56″
30	Gerhard Trampusch	Austria	5h 41′ 56″
31	Santiago Botero	Colombia	5h 41′ 56″
DPG	Michael Barry	Canada	~~5h 41′ 56″~~
33	Stuart O'Grady	Australia	5h 41′ 56″
34	Unai Etxebarria	Venezuela	5h 41′ 56″
35	Alexander Vinokourov	Kazakhstan	5h 41′ 56″
36	Luis Felipe Laverde	Colombia	5h 41′ 56″
37	Evgeni Petrov	Russia	5h 41′ 56″
38	Daniele Nardello	Italy	5h 42′ 03″
39	Luca Paolini	Italy	5h 42′ 03″
40	Peter van Petegem	Belgium	5h 42′ 03″
41	Erik Dekker	Netherlands	5h 42′ 29″
42	Romāns Vainšteins	Latvia	5h 43′ 03″
43	Gorazd Štangelj	Slovenia	5h 43′ 20″
44	Laurent Brochard	France	5h 44′ 13″
45	Benoît Joachim	Luxembourg	5h 44′ 13″
46	Cristian Moreni	Italy	5h 44′ 13″
47	Alejandro Valverde	Spain	5h 44′ 13″
48	Richard Virenque	France	5h 44′ 13″
49	Philippe Gilbert	Belgium	5h 44′ 13″
50	Uroš Murn	Slovenia	5h 44′ 13″
51	Gerrit Glomser	Austria	5h 45′ 21″
52	Karsten Kroon	Netherlands	5h 47′ 13″
53	Sergei Yakovlev	Kazakhstan	5h 48′ 48″
54	Ruslan Ivanov	Moldova	5h 50′ 35″
55	Lars Michaelsen	Denmark	5h 50′ 35″
56	Tomasz Brożyna	Poland	5h 50′ 35″
57	Yasutaka Tashiro	Japan	5h 50′ 35″
58	Rene Andrle	Czech Republic	5h 50′ 35″
59	Sergey Lagutin	Uzbekistan	5h 50′ 35″
60	Nicki Soerensen	Denmark	5h 50′ 35″
61	Janek Tombak	Estonia	5h 50′ 35″
62	Murilo Fischer	Brazil	5h 50′ 35″
63	Ján Svorada	Czech Republic	5h 50′ 35″
64	Jens Voigt	Germany	5h 50′ 35″
65	Ondřej Sosenka	Czech Republic	5h 50′ 35″
66	Igor Pugaci	Moldova	5h 50′ 35″
67	Filippo Pozzato	Italy	5h 50′ 35″
68	Yaroslav Popovych	Ukraine	5h 50′ 35″
69	Ryan Cox	South Africa	5h 50′ 35″
70	Andrey Kashechkin	Kazakhstan	5h 50′ 35″
71	Martin Riška	Slovakia	5h 51′ 28″
72	Gustav Larsson	Sweden	5h 51′ 28″
73	Andrey Mizurov	Kazakhstan	5h 51′ 28″
74	László Bodrogi	Hungary	5h 56′ 45″
75	Dawid Krupa	Poland	6h 00′ 25″
DPG	Levi Leipheimer	United States	~~DNF~~
—	Goncalo Amorim	Portugal	DNF
—	Óscar Freire	Spain	DNF
—	Igor González de Galdeano	Spain	DNF
—	Sylvain Chavanel	France	DNF
—	Michael Rasmussen	Denmark	DNF
—	Charlie Wegelius	Great Britain	DNF
—	Thomas Löfkvist	Sweden	DNF
—	Erki Pütsep	Estonia	DNF
—	Jeremy Yates	New Zealand	DNF
—	Andris Naudužs	Latvia	DNF
—	Mark Scanlon	Ireland	DNF
—	Matej Jurčo	Slovakia	DNF
—	Viatcheslav Ekimov	Russia	DNF
—	Gord Fraser	Canada	DNF
—	Christophe Moreau	France	DNF
—	Slawomir Kohut	Poland	DNF
—	Amir Zargari	Iran	DNF
—	Iván Gutiérrez	Spain	DNF
—	Win Vansevenant	Belgium	DNF
—	Marc Wauters	Belgium	DNF
—	Michael Rogers	Australia	DNF
—	Fabian Cancellara	Switzerland	DNF
—	Grégory Rast	Switzerland	DNF
—	Servais Knaven	Netherlands	DNF
—	Victor Hugo Pena Grisales	Colombia	DNF
—	Morten Hegreberg	Norway	DNF
—	Tiaan Kannemeyer	South Africa	DNF
—	José Chacón	Venezuela	DNF
—	Dmitar Gospodinov	Bulgaria	DNF
—	Evgeny Vakker	Kyrgyzstan	DNF
—	Andreas Klöden	Germany	DNF
—	Michael Rich	Germany	DNF
—	Jason McCartney	United States	DNF
—	Baden Cooke	Australia	DNF
—	Matt White	Australia	DNF
—	Rubens Bertogliati	Switzerland	DNF
—	Denis Menchov	Russia	DNF
—	Vladimir Duma	Ukraine	DNF
—	Yuriy Krivtsov	Ukraine	DNF
—	Radosław Romanik	Poland	DNF
—	Sylwester Szmyd	Poland	DNF
—	Julian Winn	Great Britain	DNF
—	Maxim Iglinskiy	Kazakhstan	DNF
—	Bernhard Eisel	Austria	DNF
—	Cândido Barbosa	Portugal	DNF
—	Magnus Bäckstedt	Sweden	DNF
—	Andrus Aug	Estonia	DNF
—	Thor Hushovd	Norway	DNF
—	Mads Kaggestad	Norway	DNF
—	Heath Blackgrove	New Zealand	DNF
—	Robin Reid	New Zealand	DNF
—	Márcio May	Brazil	DNF
—	Eric Wohlberg	Canada	DNF
—	Alexandre Usov	Belarus	DNF
—	Marcelo Arriagada	Chile	DNF
—	Wong Kam Po	Hong Kong	DNF
—	Ivan Stević	Serbia and Montenegro	DNF
—	Michal Hrazdíra	Czech Republic	DNF
—	Robert Hunter	South Africa	DNF
—	Shinri Suzuki	Japan	DNF
—	Abbas Saeidi Tanha	Iran	DNF
—	Jaan Kirsipuu	Estonia	DNF
—	Luciano Pagliarini	Brazil	DNF
—	Stuart Dangerfield	Great Britain	DNF
—	Vladimir Karpets	Russia	DNF
—	Igor Astarloa	Spain	DNF
—	Michael Boogerd	Netherlands	DNF
—	Marlon Pérez Arango	Colombia	DNF
