= Dwars door West-Vlaanderen =

Belgian road cycling race

Race details
- Date: Early March
- Region: West Flanders, Belgium
- Local name(s): Dwars door West-Vlaanderen (in Dutch)
- Discipline: Road
- Competition: UCI Europe Tour
- Type: One-day race
- Web site: www.3dwvl.be

History
- First edition: 1945
- Editions: 72 (as of 2018)
- First winner: Marcel Kint (BEL)
- Most wins: Gustaaf De Smet (BEL); Patrick Sercu (BEL); Wilfried Peeters (BEL); Erik Dekker (NED); Niko Eeckhout (BEL) (2 wins)
- Most recent: Rémi Cavagna (FRA)

Dwars door West-Vlaanderen is a road bicycle race through the Belgian province of West Flanders.

== History ==
The race was originally created unter the name Omloop der Vlaamse Ardennen (English: Tour of the Flemish Ardennes) in 1945 as a one-day race. It remained like that until 1999, when it became a two-day stage race and was renamed Guldensporentweedaagse. In 2003 it was extended to three days and became known as the Driedaagse van West-Vlaanderen (English: Three Days of West Flanders), and held on to this format until 2016. It was also known as the Johan Museeuw Classic. From 2006 to 2016 the race was organized as a 2.1 event on the UCI Europe Tour.

Since 2017 the race morphed into a one-day event again and was rebranded Dwars door West-Vlaanderen; initially as a 1.1 event of the UCI Europe Tour but with the aim of becoming a 1.HC event in the near future.

However, due to a shortage of volunteers for a race of this size, the organizers decided to cancel the event in 2018.

== Winners ==
| Year | Country | Rider | Team |
|---|---|---|---|
| 1945 | Belgium | Marcel Kint | Mercier–Hutchinson |
| 1946 | Belgium | Joseph Somers (cyclist) | Rochet–Dunlop |
| 1947 | Belgium | Michel Remue | Alcyon–Dunlop |
| 1948 | Belgium | Raymond Impanis | Alcyon–Dunlop |
| 1949 | Belgium | Norbert Callens | Mercier–Hutchinson |
| 1950 | Belgium | Arseen Ryckaert | De Walsche Sport |
| 1951 | Belgium | Valeer Ollivier | Bertin |
| 1952 | Belgium | Kwik Van Kerckhove | Mercier–Hutchinson |
| 1953 | Belgium | Marcel Dierckens | Dossche Sport |
| 1954 | Belgium | Maurice Blomme | Bertin–d'Alessandro |
| 1955 | Belgium | René Mertens | Groene Leeuw |
| 1956 | Belgium | Frans Van Looveren | Carpano–Coppi |
| 1957 | Belgium | Noël Foré | Groene Leeuw |
| 1958 | Belgium | Cyriel Vanbossel | Carpano |
| 1959 | Belgium | Daniël Denys | Groene Leeuw |
| 1960 | Belgium | Florent Vanpollaert | Pelforth 43–Carlier |
| 1961 | Belgium | Gabriël Borra | Alcyon |
| 1962 | Belgium | Staf Vanvaerenbergh | Liberia–Grammont–Wolber |
| 1963 | Belgium | Gustaaf De Smet | Groene Leeuw |
| 1964 | Belgium | Lucien Gaelens | Labo–Dr. Mann |
| 1965 | Belgium | Bernard Van De Kerckhove | Solo–Superia |
| 1966 | Belgium | Noël Vanclooster | Mann–Grundig |
| 1967 | Belgium | Gustaaf De Smet | Groene Leeuw |
| 1968 | Belgium | Willy Vanneste | Mann–Grundig |
| 1969 | Belgium | Eric De Vlaeminck | Flandria–De Clerck–Krüger |
| 1970 | No race | | |
| 1971 | Belgium | Eric Leman | Flandria–Mars |
| 1972 | Netherlands | Tino Tabak | Goudsmit–Hoff |
| 1973 | Belgium | Frans Verbeeck | Watney–Maes |
| 1974 | Belgium | Patrick Sercu | Brooklyn |
| 1975 | Belgium | Patrick Sercu | Brooklyn |
| 1976 | Belgium | Chris De Buysschere | Carlos |
| 1977 | Belgium | Herman Beyssens | Flandria–Velda–Latina Assicurazioni |
| 1978 | Belgium | Leo Van Thielen | Safir–Beyers–Ludo |
| 1979 | Netherlands | Piet Van Katwijk | TI–Raleigh |
| 1980 | Belgium | Johan Wellens | Eurobouw |
| 1981 | Belgium | Ferdi Vandenhaute | La Redoute–Motobécane |
| 1982 | Belgium | Dirk Heirweg | Maufroy–Moser |
| 1983 | Belgium | Ludo Peeters | TI–Raleigh |
| 1984 | Belgium | William Tackaert | Fangio–Ecoturbo |
| 1985 | Netherlands | Hans Daams | Kwantum–Decosol–Yoko |
| 1986 | Belgium | Jos Lieckens | Lotto–Emerxil–Merckx |
| 1987 | Belgium | Franky Van Oyen | Sigma |
| 1988 | Netherlands | Michel Cornelisse | Superconfex–Yoko |
| 1989 | Belgium | Luc Colijn | Humo–TW Rock |
| 1990 | Belgium | Dirk Demol | Lotto–Superclub |
| 1991 | Belgium | Hendrik Redant | Lotto |
| 1992 | Netherlands | Nico Verhoeven | PDM–Concorde |
| 1993 | Belgium | Niko Eeckhout | Collstrop–Assur Carpets |
| 1994 | Denmark | Bo Hamburger | TVM–Bison kit |
| 1995 | Belgium | Johan Museeuw | Mapei–GB–Latexco |
| 1996 | Belgium | Wilfried Peeters | Mapei–GB |
| 1997 | Netherlands | Leon Van Bon | Rabobank |
| 1998 | Denmark | Jesper Skibby | home–Jack & Jones |
| 1999 | Belgium | Wilfried Peeters | Mapei–Quick-Step |
| 2000 | Netherlands | Servais Knaven | Lotto–Adecco |
| 2001 | Netherlands | Erik Dekker | Rabobank |
| 2002 | Netherlands | Erik Dekker | Rabobank |
| 2003 | Estonia | Jaan Kirsipuu | AG2R Prévoyance |
| 2004 | Germany | Robert Bartko | Rabobank |
| 2005 | No race | | |
| 2006 | Belgium | Niko Eeckhout | Chocolade Jacques–Topsport Vlaanderen |
| 2007 | France | Jimmy Casper | Unibet.com |
| 2008 | Netherlands | Bobbie Traksel | P3 Transfer–Batavus |
| 2009 | Netherlands | Johnny Hoogerland | Vacansoleil |
| 2010 | Belgium | Jens Keukeleire | Cofidis |
| 2011 | New Zealand | Jesse Sergent | Team RadioShack |
| 2012 | Belgium | Julien Vermote | Omega Pharma–Quick-Step |
| 2013 | Belgium | Kristof Vandewalle | Omega Pharma–Quick-Step |
| 2014 | Estonia | Gert Jõeäär | Cofidis |
| 2015 | Belgium | Yves Lampaert | Etixx–Quick-Step |
| 2016 | Belgium | Sean De Bie | Lotto–Soudal |
| 2017 | Netherlands | Jos van Emden | LottoNL–Jumbo |
| 2018 | France | Rémi Cavagna | Quick-Step Floors |
