= 2000 Paris–Roubaix =

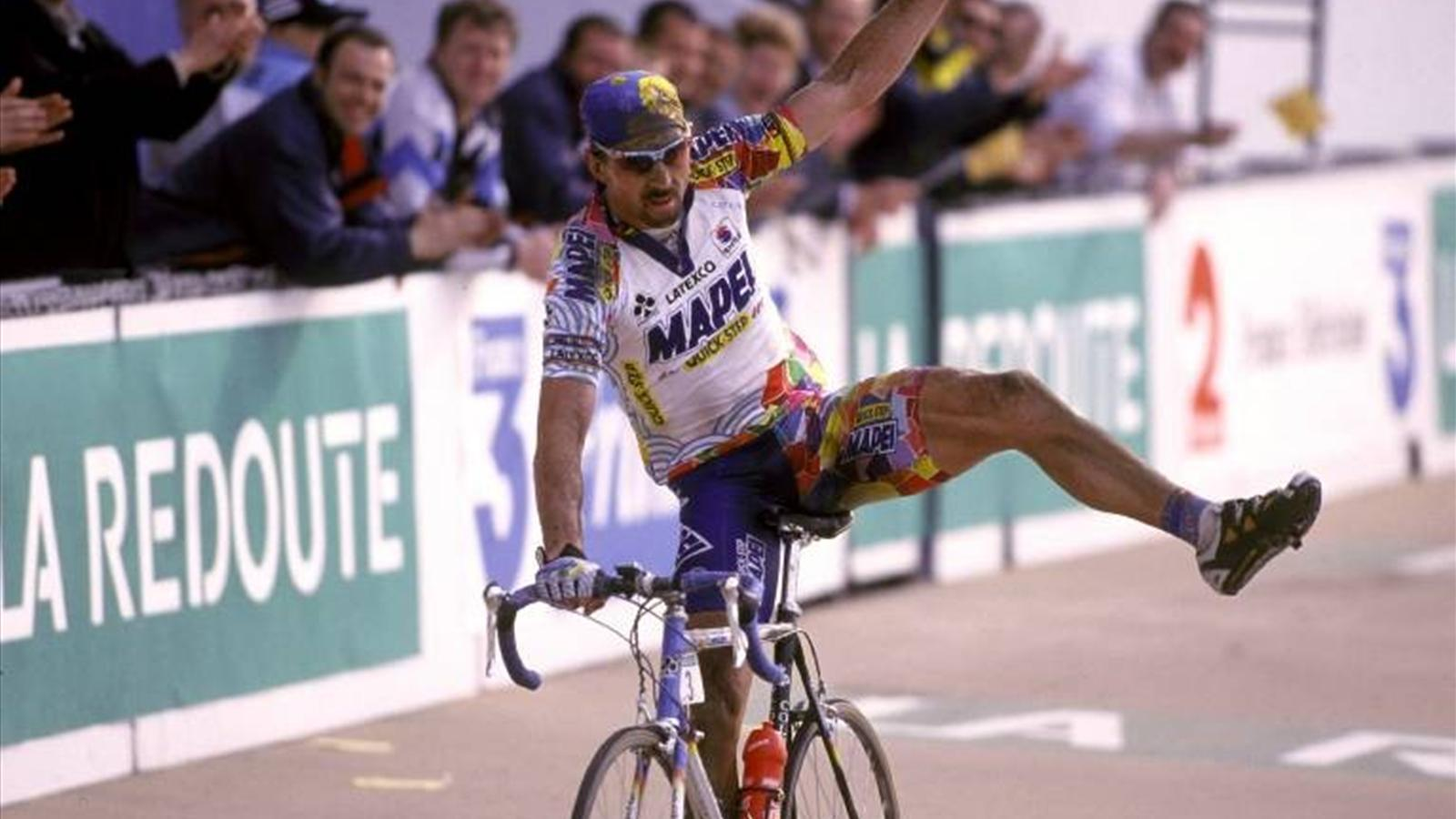
- Johan Museeuw crossing the finish line first

Race details
- Dates: April 9, 2000
- Stages: 1
- Distance: 272 km (169 mi)
- Winning time: 6h 47' 00"

Results
	Winner	Johan Museeuw (BEL)	(Mapei–Quick-Step)
	Second	Peter Van Petegem (BEL)	(Farm Frites)
	Third	Erik Zabel (GER)	(Team Telekom)

The 2000 Paris–Roubaix was the 98th running of the Paris–Roubaix single-day cycling race, often known as the Hell of the North. It was held on 9 April 2000 over a distance of 272 kilometres (169.0 miles). These are the results for the 2000 edition of the Paris–Roubaix cycling classic, in which Johan Museeuw took his second Roubaix win. The year's race took place in warm and dry conditions but with strong winds.

== Results ==
9-04-2000: Compiègne–Roubaix

Results (1–10)
	Cyclist	Team	Time
1	Johan Museeuw (BEL)	Mapei–Quick-Step	6h 47' 00"
2	Peter Van Petegem (BEL)	Farm Frites	+ 15"
3	Erik Zabel (GER)	Team Telekom	+ 15"
4	Tristan Hoffman (NED)	Memory Card–Jack & Jones	+ 15"
5	Stefano Zanini (ITA)	Mapei–Quick-Step	+ 15"
6	George Hincapie (USA)	U.S. Postal Service	+ 15"
7	Marc Wauters (BEL)	Rabobank	+ 15"
8	Franco Ballerini (ITA)	Lampre–Daikin	+ 15"
9	Steffen Wesemann (GER)	Team Telekom	+ 21"
10	Andrea Tafi (ITA)	Mapei–Quick-Step	+ 1' 18"
