= 1998 Omloop Het Volk =

Race details
- Dates: 28 February 1998
- Stages: 1
- Distance: 202 km (126 mi)
- Winning time: 5h 08' 00"

Results
	Winner	Peter Van Petegem (BEL)
	Second	Gianluca Bortolami (ITA)
	Third	Andrei Tchmil (UKR)

The 1998 Omloop Het Volk was the 52nd edition of the Omloop Het Volk cycle race and was held on 28 February 1998. The race started in Ghent and finished in Lokeren. The race was won by Peter Van Petegem.

== General classification ==
Final general classification
Rank	Rider	Time
1	Peter Van Petegem (BEL)	5h 08' 00"
2	Gianluca Bortolami (ITA)	+ 12"
3	Andrei Tchmil (BEL)	+ 15"
4	Max van Heeswijk (NED)	+ 15"
5	Johan Museeuw (BEL)	+ 15"
6	Stuart O'Grady (AUS)	+ 15"
7	Arvis Piziks (LAT)	+ 15"
8	Servais Knaven (NED)	+ 2' 02"
9	Fabio Baldato (ITA)	+ 2' 02"
10	Henk Vogels (AUS)	+ 2' 02"
