= 2001 Dwars door Vlaanderen =

Race details
- Dates: 28 March 2001
- Stages: 1
- Distance: 201 km (124.9 mi)
- Winning time: 5h 09' 08"

Results
	Winner	Niko Eeckhout (BEL)
	Second	Wilfried Peeters (BEL)
	Third	Arvis Piziks (LAT)

The 2001 Dwars door Vlaanderen was the 56th edition of the Dwars door Vlaanderen cycle race and was held on 28 March 2001. The race started in Kortrijk and finished in Waregem. The race was won by Niko Eeckhout.

== General classification ==
Final general classification

Rank	Rider	Time
1	Niko Eeckhout (BEL)	5h 09' 08"
2	Wilfried Peeters (BEL)	+ 1' 03"
3	Arvis Piziks (LAT)	+ 1' 03"
4	Jaan Kirsipuu (EST)	+ 1' 03"
5	Tristan Hoffman (NED)	+ 1' 03"
6	Servais Knaven (NED)	+ 1' 03"
7	Léon van Bon (NED)	+ 1' 03"
8	Nico Mattan (BEL)	+ 1' 03"
9	Martin Hvastija (SLO)	+ 1' 03"
10	Aart Vierhouten (NED)	+ 1' 03"
