= Axel Merckx =

Belgian cyclist

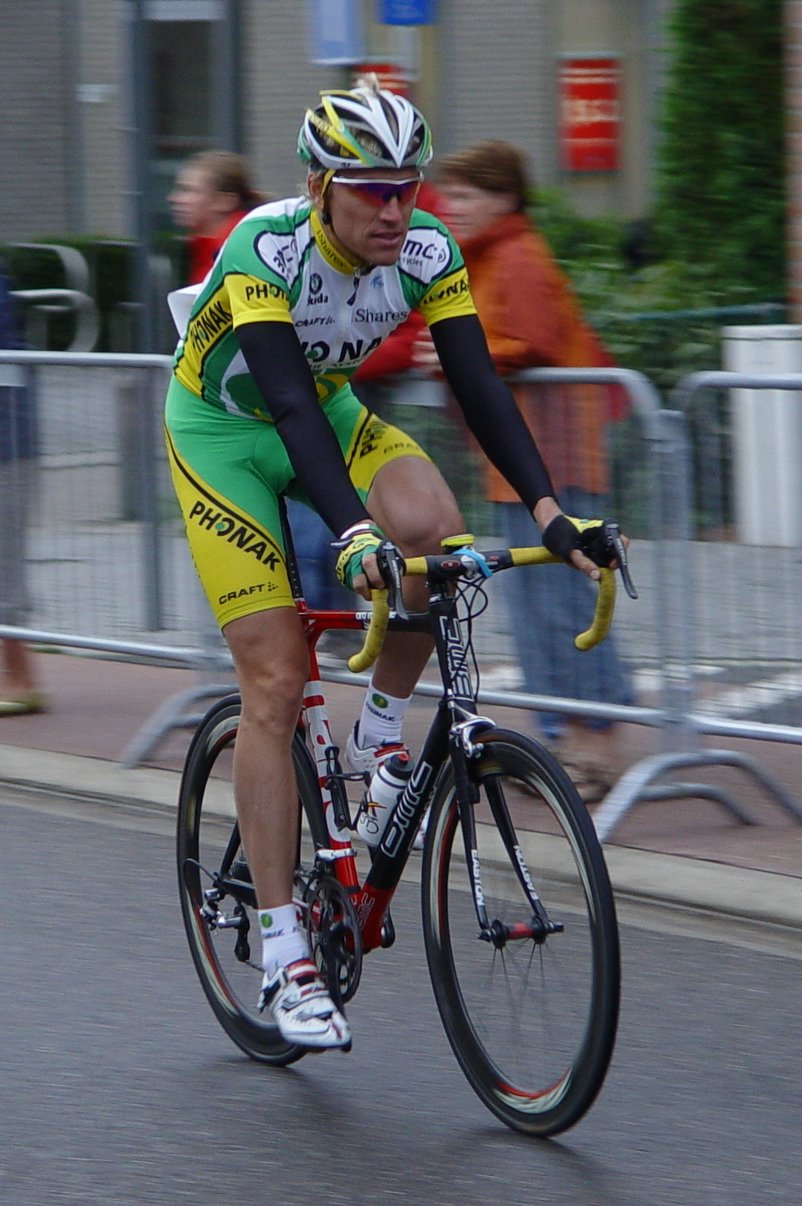
- Merckx in 2006

Personal information
- Full name: Axel Merckx
- Born: 8 August 1972 (age 54) Uccle, Belgium
- Height: 1.91 m (6 ft 3 in)
- Weight: 77 kg (170 lb)

Cycling career
- Sport: Cycling
- Current team: Hagens Berman Jayco
- Discipline: Road
- Role: Rider (retired); General manager; Team manager
- Rider type: All-rounder

Professional teams
- 1993: Motorola (stagiaire)
- 1994: Team Telekom
- 1995–1996: Motorola
- 1997–1998: Team Polti
- 1999–2000: Mapei–Quick-Step
- 2001–2002: Domo–Farm Frites–Latexco
- 2003–2005: Lotto–Domo
- 2006: Phonak
- 2007: T-Mobile Team

Managerial teams
- 2009–: Trek–Livestrong
- 2011: Team RadioShack

Major wins
- Grand Tours Giro d'Italia 1 individual stage (2000) One-day races and Classics National Road Race Championships (2000)
Medal record
Representing Belgium
Men's road bicycle racing
Olympic Games
Bronze medal – third place	2004 Athens	Road Race

Axel Eddy Lucien Jonkheer Merckx (born 8 August 1972) is a Belgian former professional road bicycle racer and the son of five-time Tour de France champion Eddy Merckx. He is team director of UCI Continental team Hagens Berman Jayco.

In his professional career, he won the Belgian national road race championship in 2000 and a bronze medal in the road race at the 2004 Olympic Games in Athens.

== Cycling career ==
Born in Uccle, Axel Merckx became a professional cyclist in 1993, winning the Belgian national road race championship in 2000. He vowed to make his mark by accomplishing feats that had eluded his father, such as winning a Tour de France stage at Alpe d'Huez and the Paris–Tours classic. He did not succeed, but competed in eight Tours de France and finished as the highest-placed Belgian rider six times. His personal best finish was tenth in the 1998 edition.

Merckx won the bronze medal in the road race at the 2004 Games in Athens, breaking free in the final kilometre.

During the 2006 Tour de France, Merckx announced that he signed a new contract for one extra season with Phonak, later renamed iShares. He stated that this would be his last season as a professional road bicycle racer. However, after Phonak announced that it would stop sponsoring the cycling team, Merckx signed a contract with Team T-Mobile, where he had started his professional career. During the 2006 Tour Merckx was instrumental in forcing the pace of the peloton for teammate Floyd Landis who won the Tour. He was often the only team mate able to stay with Landis and the group of favorites and he initially finished 31st overall; however, it was later discovered that Landis had failed a doping control after stage 17 and the Tour win was revoked.

Merckx announced his retirement from professional cycling at the end of the 2007 Tour de France. He won his last race at Lommel, in August 2007.

His name was on the list of doping tests published by the French Senate on 24 July 2013 that were collected during the 1998 Tour de France then retested in 2004. Merckx was not one of then 18 riders named as testing positive for EPO but was on a list of 12 named riders whose test results were listed as "suspicious".

Merckx is the owner and directeur sportif of the Hagens Berman Jayco team.

== Personal life ==
Merckx married Canadian triathlete Jodi Cross in 1997, and they lived in Kelowna, British Columbia. They have two children, born 2001 and 2005.

As of April 2024, Merckx was in a relationship with American cyclist Chloe Dygert, with whom he lived in Belgium.

In 2025 he was seen in the company of Lotte Kopecky whom he married in May 2026.

When his father was made a baron—a personal title—in Belgium, he also received the hereditary title Écuyer (in French) or Jonkheer (in Dutch). Thereby Axel Merckx has also been ennobled.

== Major results ==
1992
1st Stage 9 Tour de l'Avenir
1993
2nd Seraing–Aachen–Seraing
1994
9th Prueba Villafranca de Ordizia
1995
6th Overall Tour Méditerranéen
8th Overall Danmark Rundt
8th Veenendaal–Veenendaal
9th Grand Prix Eddy Merckx
1996
3rd Giro di Lombardia
4th Road race, UCI Road World Championships
6th Brabantse Pijl
7th Liège–Bastogne–Liège
10th Overall Tour DuPont
1997
6th Giro di Lombardia
9th Breitling Grand Prix (with Jörg Jaksche)
1998
2nd Overall Bayern Rundfahrt

1st Stage 3

2nd Clásica de San Sebastián
2nd Subida a Urkiola
6th Trofeo Pantalica
7th Gran Premio de Primavera de Amorebieta
7th Breitling Grand Prix (with Jörg Jaksche)
9th Grand Prix Eddy Merckx
10th Overall Tour de France
1999
3rd Road race, National Road Championships
4th Tour du Haut Var
9th Overall Tour Méditerranéen
2000
1st Road race, National Road Championships
1st Overall Tour de la Région Wallonne
1st Stage 8 Giro d'Italia
3rd Châteauroux Classic
4th Overall Rheinland-Pfalz Rundfahrt
5th Liège–Bastogne–Liège
5th Tour du Haut Var
7th Overall Tour Méditerranéen
7th Setmana Catalana de Ciclisme
9th Overall Volta a Catalunya
10th La Flèche Wallonne
2001
1st Grand Prix de Wallonie
3rd Brabantse Pijl
5th Trofeo Laigueglia
7th Coppa Sabatini
7th Route Adélie de Vitré
7th EnBW Grand Prix (with Piotr Wadecki)
9th Road race, National Road Championships
2002
2nd Overall Vuelta a Andalucía
6th Road race, National Road Championships
6th La Flèche Wallonne
2003
1st Overall Tour de l'Ain
3rd Overall Rheinland-Pfalz Rundfahrt
3rd Overall Hessen–Rundfahrt
4th Overall Tour of Belgium
10th Luk-Cup Bühl
2004
3rd Road race, Olympic Games
5th Brabantse Pijl
8th Grand Prix Eddy Merckx
2005
1st Stage 5 Critérium du Dauphiné Libéré
3rd Brabantse Pijl
4th LuK Challenge (with Marc Wauters)

=== Grand Tour general classification results timeline ===
Grand Tour	1994	1995	1996	1997	1998	1999	2000	2001	2002	2003	2004	2005	2006	2007
Giro d'Italia	—	—	—	19	—	—	25	—	—	—	—	—	DNF	50
Tour de France	—	—	—	—	10	DNF	—	22	28	DNF	21	39	30	62
Vuelta a España	—	21	17	—	—	—	—	—	—	—	—	—	—	—

Legend
—	Did not compete
DNF	Did not finish
