= 1994 Amstel Gold Race =

Dutch cycling race

The 1994 Amstel Gold Race was the 29th edition of the annual Amstel Gold Race road bicycle race, held on Sunday April 23, 1994, in the Dutch province of Limburg. The race stretched 250 kilometres, with the start in Heerlen and the finish in Maastricht. There were a total of 181 competitors, with 48 cyclists finishing the race.

== Results ==
	Rider	Team	Time
1	Johan Museeuw (BEL)	GB–MG Maglificio	6h 42' 34"
2	Bruno Cenghialta (ITA)	Gewiss–Ballan	s.t.
3	Marco Saligari (ITA)	GB–MG Maglificio	+ 7"
4	Alberto Volpi (ITA)	Gewiss–Ballan	s.t.
5	Davide Rebellin (ITA)	GB–MG Maglificio	s.t.
6	Steven Rooks (NED)	TVM–Bison Kit	s.t.
7	Claudio Chiappucci (ITA)	Carrera Jeans–Tassoni	s.t.
8	Gérard Rué (FRA)	Banesto	s.t.
9	Richard Virenque (FRA)	Festina–Lotus	s.t.
10	Didier Rous (FRA)	GAN	s.t.
