= 1993 Paris–Tours =

Race details
- Dates: 3 October 1993
- Stages: 1
- Distance: 251 km (156.0 mi)
- Winning time: 6h 34' 50"

Results
	Winner	Johan Museeuw (BEL)	(GB–MG Maglificio)
	Second	Maurizio Fondriest (ITA)	(Lampre–Polti)
	Third	Alexander Gontchenkov (UKR)	(Lampre–Polti)

The 1993 Paris–Tours was the 87th edition of the Paris–Tours cycle race and was held on 6 October 1993. The race started in Saint-Arnoult-en-Yvelines and finished in Tours. The race was won by Johan Museeuw of the MG Maglificio team.

== General classification ==
Final general classification

Rank	Rider	Team	Time
1	Johan Museeuw (BEL)	GB–MG Maglificio	6h 34' 50"
2	Maurizio Fondriest (ITA)	Lampre–Polti	+ 0"
3	Alexander Gontchenkov (UKR)	Lampre–Polti	+ 5"
4	Sean Kelly (IRL)	Festina–Lotus	+ 5"
5	Adri van der Poel (NED)	Mercatone Uno–Zucchini–Medeghini	+ 5"
6	Alain Van Den Bossche (BEL)	TVM–Bison Kit	+ 5"
7	Martin van Steen (NED)	TVM–Bison Kit	+ 5"
8	Jean-Pierre Heynderickx (BEL)	Collstrop–Assur Carpets	+ 5"
9	Jesper Skibby (DEN)	TVM–Bison Kit	+ 5"
10	Fabio Baldato (ITA)	GB–MG Maglificio	+ 5"
