= 2002 Paris–Roubaix =

Race details
- Dates: April 14, 2002
- Stages: 1
- Distance: 261 km (162.2 mi)
- Winning time: 6h 39' 08"

Results
	Winner	Johan Museeuw (BEL)	(Domo–Farm Frites)
	Second	Steffen Wesemann (GER)	(Team Telekom)
	Third	Tom Boonen (BEL)	(U.S. Postal Service)

The 2002 Paris–Roubaix was the 100th running of the Paris–Roubaix single-day cycling race, often known as the Hell of the North. It was held on 14 April 2002 over a distance of 261 kilometres (162.2 miles).

Belgian rider Johan Museeuw of Domo–Farm Frites entered history by winning his third Paris–Roubaix after an impressive attack 40 kilometres from the Velodrome of Roubaix. This edition was run under wind and rain conditions.

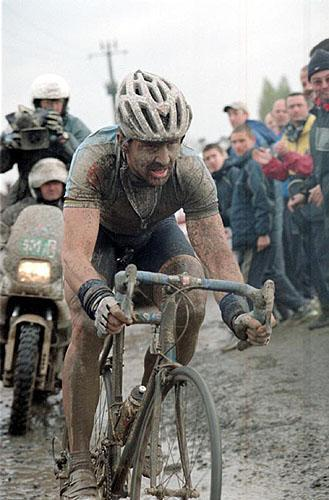
Museeuw's third success at Paris-Roubaix was in dire weather conditions

== Results ==
14-04-2002: Compiègne–Roubaix, 261 km.

Results (1–10)
	Cyclist	Team	Time
1	Johan Museeuw (BEL)	Domo–Farm Frites	6h 39' 08"
2	Steffen Wesemann (GER)	Team Telekom	+ 3' 04"
3	Tom Boonen (BEL)	U.S. Postal Service	+ 3' 08"
4	Tristan Hoffman (NED)	CSC–Tiscali	+ 4' 02"
5	Lars Michaelsen (DEN)	Team Coast	+ 4' 02"
6	George Hincapie (USA)	U.S. Postal Service	+ 4' 02"
7	Thierry Gouvenou (FRA)	BigMat–Auber 93	+ 4' 02"
8	Max van Heeswijk (NED)	Domo–Farm Frites	+ 4' 02"
9	Nico Mattan (BEL)	Cofidis	+ 4' 02"
10	Enrico Cassani (ITA)	Domo–Farm Frites	+ 4' 02"
