= 2000 Omloop Het Volk =

Race details
- Dates: 26 February 2000
- Stages: 1
- Distance: 204 km (127 mi)
- Winning time: 5h 01' 00"

Results
	Winner	Johan Museeuw (BEL)
	Second	Steffen Wesemann (SUI)
	Third	Servais Knaven (NED)

The 2000 Omloop Het Volk was the 54th edition of the Omloop Het Volk cycle race and was held on 26 February 2000. The race started in Ghent and finished in Lokeren. The race was won by Johan Museeuw.

== General classification ==
Final general classification
Rank	Rider	Time
1	Johan Museeuw (BEL)	5h 01' 00"
2	Steffen Wesemann (SUI)	+ 52"
3	Servais Knaven (NED)	+ 52"
4	Franco Ballerini (ITA)	+ 52"
5	Romāns Vainšteins (LAT)	+ 1' 52"
6	Tom Steels (BEL)	+ 1' 52"
7	Tristan Hoffman (NED)	+ 1' 52"
8	Andrei Tchmil (BEL)	+ 1' 52"
9	Jaan Kirsipuu (EST)	+ 1' 52"
10	Daniele Nardello (ITA)	+ 1' 52"
