= 1997 HEW Cyclassics =

Race details
- Dates: 10 August 1997
- Stages: 1
- Distance: 190 km (118.1 mi)
- Winning time: 4h 10' 04"

Results
	Winner	Jan Ullrich (GER)
	Second	Wilfried Peeters (BEL)
	Third	Jens Heppner (GER)

The 1997 HEW Cyclassics was the second edition of the HEW Cyclassics cycle race and was held on 10 August 1997. The race started and finished in Hamburg. The race was won by Jan Ullrich.

== General classification ==
Final general classification

Rank	Rider	Time
1	Jan Ullrich (GER)	4h 10' 04"
2	Wilfried Peeters (BEL)	+ 7"
3	Jens Heppner (GER)	+ 9"
4	Michael Rich (GER)	+ 4' 24"
5	Mario Kummer (GER)	+ 4' 32"
6	Sascha Henrix (GER)	+ 4' 43"
7	Andreas Klöden (GER)	+ 4' 43"
8	Ludo Dierckxsens (BEL)	+ 4' 43"
9	Jörn Reuss (GER)	+ 4' 43"
10	Ralf Schöllhammer (GER)	+ 4' 43"
