= 1996 Giro di Lombardia =

Race details
- Dates: 19 October 1996
- Stages: 1
- Distance: 250 km (155.3 mi)
- Winning time: 5h 51' 46"

Results
	Winner	Andrea Tafi (ITA)	(Mapei–GB)
	Second	Fabian Jeker (SUI)	(Festina–Lotus)
	Third	Axel Merckx (BEL)	(Motorola)

The 1996 Giro di Lombardia was the 90th edition of the Giro di Lombardia cycle race and was held on 19 October 1996. The race started in Varese and finished in Bergamo. The race was won by Andrea Tafi of the Mapei team.

== General classification ==
Final general classification

Rank	Rider	Team	Time
1	Andrea Tafi (ITA)	Mapei–GB	5h 51' 46"
2	Fabian Jeker (SUI)	Festina–Lotus	+ 2' 19"
3	Axel Merckx (BEL)	Motorola	+ 2' 22"
4	Daniele Nardello (ITA)	Mapei–GB	+ 2' 29"
5	Davide Rebellin (ITA)	Team Polti	+ 2' 29"
6	Gianni Bugno (ITA)	MG Maglificio–Technogym	+ 3' 03"
7	Richard Virenque (FRA)	Festina–Lotus	+ 3' 03"
8	Mauro Gianetti (SUI)	Team Polti	+ 3' 03"
9	Laurent Jalabert (FRA)	ONCE	+ 3' 03"
10	Andrea Peron (ITA)	Motorola	+ 3' 03"
