= 1996 Brabantse Pijl =

Race details
- Dates: 31 March 1996
- Stages: 1
- Distance: 181 km (112.5 mi)
- Winning time: 4h 20' 05"

Results
	Winner	Johan Museeuw (BEL)
	Second	Edwig Van Hooydonck (BEL)
	Third	Gianluca Pianegonda (ITA)

The 1996 Brabantse Pijl was the 36th edition of the Brabantse Pijl cycle race and was held on 31 March 1996. The race started and finished in Alsemberg. The race was won by Johan Museeuw.

== General classification ==
Final general classification

Rank	Rider	Time
1	Johan Museeuw (BEL)	4h 20' 05"
2	Edwig Van Hooydonck (BEL)	+ 0"
3	Gianluca Pianegonda (ITA)	+ 4"
4	Maarten den Bakker (NED)	+ 7"
5	Andrei Tchmil (UKR)	+ 8"
6	Axel Merckx (BEL)	+ 12"
7	Erwin Thijs (BEL)	+ 18"
8	Fabio Roscioli (ITA)	+ 24"
9	Rolf Sørensen (DEN)	+ 37"
10	Michael Boogerd (NED)	+ 1' 26"
