= UCI Road World Rankings =

System of cycling ranking over a twelve-month period

The UCI Road World Rankings was a men's system of ranking road bicycle racers based upon the results in all UCI-sanctioned races over a twelve-month period. The world rankings were first instituted by the UCI in 1984. The ranking is based on the results of last solar year and every races attribuited points based on their importance.

== Ranking ==
Sean Kelly of Ireland was the first rider to be ranked world number 1 in March 1984 and was the year-end rankings leader for five years from 1984 to 1988 inclusive. The only other rider to come close to Kelly's dominance was Laurent Jalabert who topped the rankings four times, from 1995 to 1997 and again in 1999.

The competition was run in parallel to the UCI Road World Cup, which included 10 UCI races. Both were replaced at the end of the 2004 season with the inauguration of the UCI ProTour and UCI Continental Circuits. A revised version of the ProTour ranking was announced for the 2009 season, renamed UCI World Ranking.

=== Individual winners ===
Anno	Winner	Second	Third
1984	Sean Kelly (IRL)	Giuseppe Saronni (ITA)	Bernard Hinault (FRA)
1985	Sean Kelly (IRL)	Phil Anderson (AUS)	Bernard Hinault (FRA)
1986	Sean Kelly (IRL)	Greg LeMond (USA)	Adri van der Poel (NED)
1987	Sean Kelly (IRL)	Stephen Roche (IRL)	Adri van der Poel (NED)
1988	Sean Kelly (IRL)	Charly Mottet (FRA)	Steven Rooks (NED)
1989	Laurent Fignon (FRA)	Charly Mottet (FRA)	Sean Kelly (IRL)
1990	Gianni Bugno (ITA)	Claudio Chiappucci (ITA)	Charly Mottet (FRA)
1991	Gianni Bugno (ITA)	Miguel Indurain (ESP)	Claudio Chiappucci (ITA)
1992	Miguel Indurain (ESP)	Tony Rominger (SUI)	Claudio Chiappucci (ITA)
1993	Miguel Indurain (ESP)	Tony Rominger (SUI)	Maurizio Fondriest (ITA)
1994	Tony Rominger (SUI)	Miguel Indurain (ESP)	Claudio Chiappucci (ITA)
1995	Laurent Jalabert (FRA)	Tony Rominger (SUI)	Miguel Indurain (ESP)
1996	Laurent Jalabert (FRA)	Alex Zülle (SUI)	Bjarne Riis (DEN)
1997	Laurent Jalabert (FRA)	Jan Ullrich (GER)	Michele Bartoli (ITA)
1998	Michele Bartoli (ITA)	Laurent Jalabert (FRA)	Abraham Olano (ESP)
1999	Laurent Jalabert (FRA)	Michael Boogerd (NED)	Frank Vandenbroucke (BEL)
2000	Francesco Casagrande (ITA)	Erik Zabel (GER)	Romāns Vainšteins (LAT)
2001	Erik Zabel (GER)	Erik Dekker (NED)	Davide Rebellin (ITA)
2002	Erik Zabel (GER)	Lance Armstrong (USA)	Paolo Bettini (ITA)
2003	Paolo Bettini (ITA)	Erik Zabel (GER)	Alessandro Petacchi (ITA)
2004	Damiano Cunego (ITA)	Paolo Bettini (ITA)	Erik Zabel (GER)

=== Teams and Nations Winners ===
Year	Winner Team	Winner Nation
1984	(France) Skil–Reydel–Sem–Mavic	No Classification
1985	(France) Skil–Sem–Kas–Miko	No Classification
1986	(Spain) Kas	No Classification
1987	(Spain) Kas	No Classification
1988	(Spain) Kas–Canal 10	No Classification
1989	(France) Super U–Raleigh–Fiat	No Classification
1990	(Italy) Chateau d'Ax–Salotti	No Classification
1991	(Italy) Chateau d'Ax–Gatorade	No Classification
1992	(Spain) Banesto	No Classification
1993	(Spain) Banesto	No Classification
1994	(Italy) Mapei–CLAS	No Classification
1995	(Italy) Mapei–GB–Latexco	No Classification
1996	(Italy) Mapei–GB	Italy
1997	(Italy) Mapei–GB	Italy
1998	(Italy) Mapei–Bricobi	Italy

Year	Division I	DIvision II	Division III	Winner Nation
1999	(Belgium) Mapei–Quick-Step	(Denmark) home–Jack & Jones	(Slovakia) De Nardi–Pasta Montegrappa	Italy
2000	(Belgium) Mapei–Quick-Step	(Spain) Euskaltel–Euskadi	(United States) Shaklee	Italy
2001	(Italy) Fassa Bortolo	(Italy) Alessio	(Colombia) 05 Orbitel	Italy
2002	(Belgium) Mapei–Quick-Step	(Denmark) EDS–Fakta	(Italy) Mapei-Qick Step Espoirs	Italy
2003	(Italy) Fassa Bortolo	(Netherlands) BankGiroLoterij–Batavus	(Poland) Action Nvidia–Mróz	Italy
2004	(Germany) T-Mobile Team	(Spain) Comunidad Valenciana–Kelme	(Germany) Team Lamonta	Italy

=== List of number one ranked riders ===
Rider	Start date
Sean Kelly (IRL)	March 1, 1984
Charly Mottet (FRA)	May 15, 1989
Laurent Fignon (FRA)	July 23, 1989
Charly Mottet (FRA) (2)	August 6, 1989
Laurent Fignon (FRA) (2)	September 1989
Gianni Bugno (ITA)	June 6, 1990
Claudio Chiappucci (ITA)	June 16, 1991
Gianni Bugno (ITA) (2)	June 1991
Miguel Indurain (ESP)	June 14, 1992
Tony Rominger (SUI)	June 12, 1994
Laurent Jalabert (FRA)	September 25, 1995
Alex Zülle (SUI)	October 10, 1996
Laurent Jalabert (FRA) (2)	October 27, 1996
Alex Zülle (SUI) (2)	March 9, 1997
Laurent Jalabert (FRA) (3)	April 6, 1997
Michele Bartoli (ITA)	October 10, 1998
Laurent Jalabert (FRA) (4)	June 6, 1999
Francesco Casagrande (ITA)	June 4, 2000
Jan Ullrich (GER)	August 20, 2000
Francesco Casagrande (ITA) (2)	September 17, 2000
Davide Rebellin (ITA)	June 10, 2001
Lance Armstrong (USA)	July 1, 2001
Erik Zabel (GER)	September 30, 2001
Erik Dekker (NED)	March 24, 2002
Erik Zabel (GER) (2)	April 7, 2002
Paolo Bettini (ITA) (2)	March 23, 2003
Erik Zabel (GER) (3)	April 6, 2003
Paolo Bettini (ITA) (3)	June 29, 2003
Erik Zabel (GER) (4)	October 5, 2003
Paolo Bettini (ITA) (4)	October 12, 2003
Erik Zabel (GER) (5)	February 22, 2004
Paolo Bettini (ITA) (5)	May 9, 2004
Erik Zabel (GER) (6)	May 30, 2004
Paolo Bettini (ITA) (6)	June 13, 2004
Alessandro Petacchi (ITA)	June 27, 2004
Erik Zabel (GER) (7)	July 25, 2004
Paolo Bettini (ITA) (7)	August 15, 2004
Erik Zabel (GER) (8)	October 3, 2004
Paolo Bettini (ITA) (8)	October 10, 2004
Damiano Cunego (ITA)	October 17, 2004
