= 2003 Gent–Wevelgem =

Race details
- Dates: 9 April 2003
- Stages: 1
- Distance: 204 km (127 mi)
- Winning time: 4h 29' 00"

Results
	Winner	Andreas Klier (GER)	(Team Telekom)
	Second	Henk Vogels (AUS)	(Navigators)
	Third	Tom Boonen (BEL)	(Quick-Step–Davitamon)

The 65th edition of the Gent–Wevelgem cycling classic race was held over 204 kilometres in Belgium on Wednesday 9 April 2003. There were a total of 164 competitors, 49 of whom finished. The winner was Germany's Andreas Klier of Team Telekom.

== Final classification ==
Rank	Rider	Team	Time
1	Andreas Klier (GER)	Team Telekom	4h 29' 00"
2	Henk Vogels (AUS)	Navigators	+ 0"
3	Tom Boonen (BEL)	Quick-Step–Davitamon	+ 0"
4	Alberto Ongarato (ITA)	De Nardi–Colpack	+ 9"
5	Servais Knaven (NED)	Quick-Step–Davitamon	+ 18"
6	Raivis Belohvoščiks (LAT)	Marlux–Wincor Nixdorf	+ 43"
7	Johan Museeuw (BEL)	Quick-Step–Davitamon	+ 1' 07"
8	Roger Hammond (GBR)	Palmans–Collstrop	+ 1' 07"
9	Max van Heeswijk (NED)	U.S. Postal Service	+ 1' 07"
10	Mathew Hayman (AUS)	Rabobank	+ 1' 07"
