= Servais Knaven =

Dutch cyclist (born 1971)

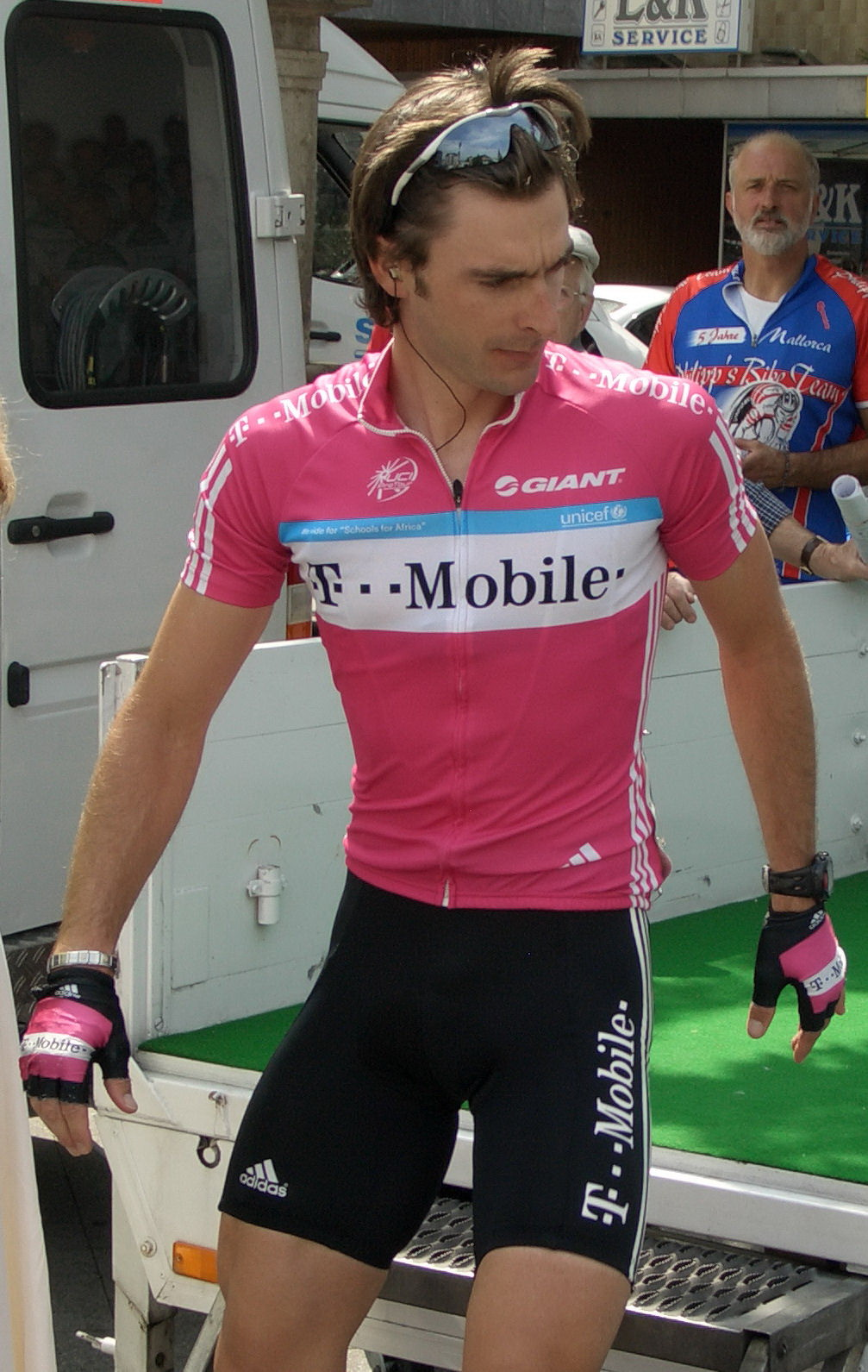

Personal information
- Full name: Henricus Theodorus Josephus Knaven
- Born: 6 March 1971 (age 55) Lobith, Netherlands
- Height: 1.78 m (5 ft 10 in)
- Weight: 70 kg (154 lb)

Cycling career
- Sport: Cycling
- Current team: AG Insurance–Soudal–Quick-Step
- Discipline: Road
- Role: Sporting and technical manager, directeur sportif
- Rider type: Classics specialist

Professional teams
- 1994–2000: TVM
- 2001–2002: Domo–Farm Frites
- 2003–2006: Quick-Step–Davitamon
- 2007–2008: T-Mobile Team
- 2009–2010: Team Milram

Managerial teams
- 2011–2022: Team Sky
- 2023–: AG Insurance–Soudal–Quick-Step

Major wins
- Grand Tours Tour de France 1 individual stage (2003) Stage races Danmark Rundt (1997) One-day races and Classics National Road Race Championships (1995) Paris–Roubaix (2001) Scheldeprijs (1998)

Henricus Theodorus Josephus (Servais) Knaven (born 6 March 1971) is a Dutch professional road bicycle racer, currently sporting and technical manager for AG Insurance–Soudal–Quick-Step. He was previously a directeur sportif for Team Sky/Ineos Grenadiers. He rode at the 1992 Summer Olympics and the 2004 Summer Olympics.

As a rider, Knaven won Paris–Roubaix in 2001 in wet and muddy conditions that soaked the cobblestones. With a strong representation of Domo–Farm Frites riders in the lead group, he launched an attack with 10 kilometres (6.2 mi) to cover and crossed the line solo. His teammates Johan Museeuw and Romans Vainsteins followed, completing a rare 1–2–3. He is the second rider in history to start and finish the Hell of the North race 16 times. In 2003, while riding for Quick-Step–Davitamon, Knaven won Stage 17 in the Tour de France. He escaped from a 10 men breakaway to take the win in a mostly flat stage concluding in Bordeaux.

== Major results ==
1991
1st Individual pursuit, National Track Amateur Championships
1st Grote Rivierenprijs
1992
1st Individual pursuit, National Track Amateur Championships
1st Overall Olympia's Tour
1993
1st Overall Teleflex Tour

1st Stage 4b

1st Overall Olympia's Tour

1st Prologue & Stage 9b

1st Ster van Brabant
1995 (1 pro win)
1st Road race, National Road Championships
1996
10th Grand Prix d'Ouverture La Marseillaise
1997 (1)
1st Overall Danmark Rundt
1st Prologue Tour of Sweden
3rd Road race, National Road Championships
4th Nokere Koerse
5th Grand Prix d'Ouverture La Marseillaise
1998 (2)
1st Scheldeprijs
4th Overall Étoile de Bessèges

1st Stage 1

5th E3 Prijs Vlaanderen
8th Omloop Het Volk
1999 (1)
1st Ronde van Midden-Zeeland
2nd Road race, National Road Championships
5th Overall Three Days of De Panne
7th Omloop Het Volk
2000 (2)
1st Overall Driedaagse van West-Vlaanderen

1st Stage 1

3rd Overall Ronde van Nederland
3rd Omloop Het Volk
3rd Arnhem–Veenendaal Classic
2001 (1)
1st Paris–Roubaix
4th Overall Danmark Rundt
6th Dwars door Vlaanderen
6th Scheldeprijs
7th Overall Three Days of De Panne
2002
10th Overall Tour of Belgium
2003 (2)
1st Stage 17 Tour de France
1st Stage 5 Tour of Qatar
1st RaboRonde Heerlen
4th Scheldeprijs
5th Overall Driedaagse van West-Vlaanderen
5th Gent–Wevelgem
7th Paris–Roubaix
2004
4th Overall Driedaagse van West-Vlaanderen
7th Dwars door Vlaanderen
2005 (1)
1st Stage 5 Tirreno–Adriatico
6th Overall Three Days of De Panne
2008
4th Time trial, National Road Championships
2010
1st Ridderronde Maastricht
9th Batavus Prorace

== See also ==
- List of Dutch Olympic cyclists

Sporting positions
Preceded by Steven Rooks	Dutch National Road Race Champion; 1995	Succeeded by Maarten den Bakker
