= Sascha Henrix =

German cyclist

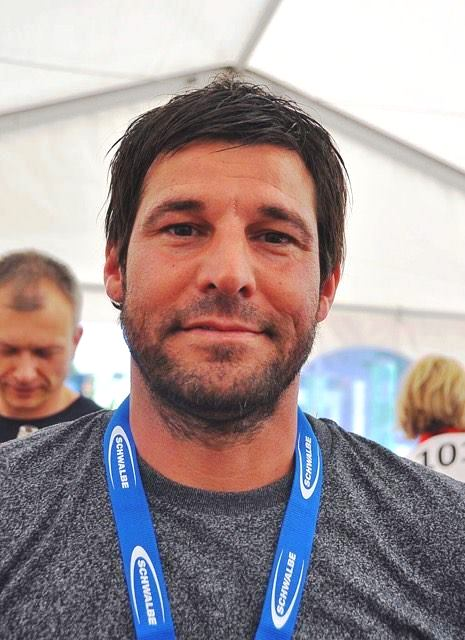
- Henrix in 2017

Personal information
- Born: 22 March 1973 (age 53) Düren, Germany

Cycling career
- Sport: Cycling
- Current team: Retired
- Discipline: Road
- Role: Rider

Professional teams
- 1996: Die Continentale–Olympia
- 1997: PSV Köln
- 1998: Team Gerolsteiner
- 1999: Gerolsteiner
- 2000: Festina
- 2001–2002: Team Coast–Buffalo
- 2003: ComNet–Senges

Sascha Henrix (born 22 March 1973) is a German former professional road cyclist.

== Major results ==
1995
3rd Rund um Düren
1997
1st Stage 6 Rheinland-Pfalz Rundfahrt
4th Luk-Cup Bühl
6th HEW Cyclassics
9th Rund um Köln
1998
1st Stage 1 Hessen Rundfahrt
1st Stage 5 Rheinland-Pfalz Rundfahrt
1st Stage 4 Sachsen Tour
4th Road race, National Road Championships
4th Rund um Düren
1999
8th Rund um Düren
10th Overall Regio-Tour
10th Rund um den Henninger Turm
2001
10th Overall Niedersachsen-Rundfahrt
10th Rund um den Henninger Turm
