= Domo–Farm Frites =

Team information
- UCI code: DFF
- Registered: Belgium
- Founded: 2001
- Disbanded: 2002
- Discipline: Road
- Status: UCI Division I (2001–2002)

Key personnel
- General manager: Hendrik Redant, Marc Sergeant
- Team manager: Patrick Lefevere

Domo–Farm Frites was a Belgian professional road cycling team that existed in the 2001–02 road cycling seasons. It was founded by Patrick Lefevere and the bulk of the Belgian riders from the Mapei team, including Johan Museeuw. Sponsor Farm Frites had previously co-sponsored TVM. The team won several notable one-day races in their existence, notably including a podium sweep of 2001 Paris–Roubaix led by Servais Knaven, 2002 Paris–Roubaix by Johan Museeuw, and 2001 Paris–Tours by Richard Virenque.

At the end of the 2002 season the team merged with the remnants of the disbanded Mapei team and became Quick-Step–Davitamon, with Lefevere at the helm. Sponsor Domo joined Lotto to co-sponsor team Lotto–Domo, with Marc Sergeant as team manager and taking several riders with him.

== Roster ==
Through its two years of existence, the team included several notable riders. In its first year former Mapei riders Johan Museeuw, his super-domestique Wilfried Peeters, American Fred Rodriguez, and Axel Merckx. In addition, they enrolled world champion Romāns Vainšteins, sprinter Robbie McEwen, classics specialist Servais Knaven, and Frenchman Richard Virenque who just returned from doping suspension. Rising young riders such as Leif Hoste, Andrey Kashechkin, and Gert Steegmans were also in the squad.

The next year brought classics specialist Frank Vandenbroucke, and youngsters Nick Nuyens and Johan Vansummeren.

== Notable wins ==
Their first year brought high-profile wins such as a podium sweep of the 2001 Paris–Roubaix with Servais Knaven, Johan Museeuw and Romāns Vainšteins on the podium. Wilfried Peeters finished fifth. Coming back from suspension, Richard Virenque won the 2001 Paris–Tours from a long two-man breakaway that many thought was hopeless.

The next season opened with Johan Museeuw's charismatic win of the 2002 Paris–Roubaix from a solo breakaway of 40 km. Virenque continued his comeback with a stage win on Mont Ventoux at the 2002 Tour de France. The season also included Museeuw's win in the HEW Cyclassics, although he did not win the UCI World Cup.
