= Directeur sportif =

Person directing a cycling team

A directeur sportif (French: [diʁɛktœʁ spɔʁtif], lit. 'sporting director') is a person directing a cycling team during a road bicycle racing event. It is seen as the equivalent to a field manager in baseball, or a head coach in football. At professional level, a directeur sportif follows the team in a car and communicates with riders, personnel and race officials by radio.

The directeur sportif warns of obstacles or challenging terrain, updates the team on the situation in the race, and provides mechanical help. The car carrying the directeur sportif also usually carries a bicycle mechanic with spare bikes, wheels and parts. It also carries spare water bottles, food and medical equipment.

Since the late 1990s, the role has increased, in keeping with better team cohesion, tactics and communication and telemetry equipment. The directeur sportif can have split times, find where riders from other teams are in the race, and dictate orders to riders. This has made teamwork and tactics more important.

A directeur sportif can also be involved in the riders' training and racing programme. Many are former professionals, such as Johan Bruyneel and Sean Yates.

Gord Fraser described his role as directeur sportif as follows:

Probably the first thing is that I’m the person who has to come up with a tactical plan at the races that will maximize the potential of the team. I’m also a motivator. I have to have a good eye for talent. I have to have recruitment skills. I have to be good with media and sponsors. And it’s best if I’m not a reckless driver since I spend so much time driving in close proximity to people riding bikes. But really, it all goes back to having the right plan in place, and coming up with a good set of options, then making sure those scenarios are communicated to the riders so they can execute that strategy during the race.

Several directeurs sportifs are also associated with famous riders whom they have nurtured. Patrick Lefevere with Johan Museeuw and Tom Boonen, Cyrille Guimard's relationship with Lucien Van Impe, Bernard Hinault, and later Laurent Fignon as well as a young Greg LeMond prior to his Tour victories; Jean de Gribaldy with Sean Kelly and Joaquim Agostinho; and Bruyneel with Lance Armstrong are examples. Others include Guillaume “Lomme” Driessens who was a Directeur for Eddy Merckx and Roger Legeay who directed LeMond during his win in the 1990 Tour de France.
