= Johan Museeuw =

Belgian racing cyclist

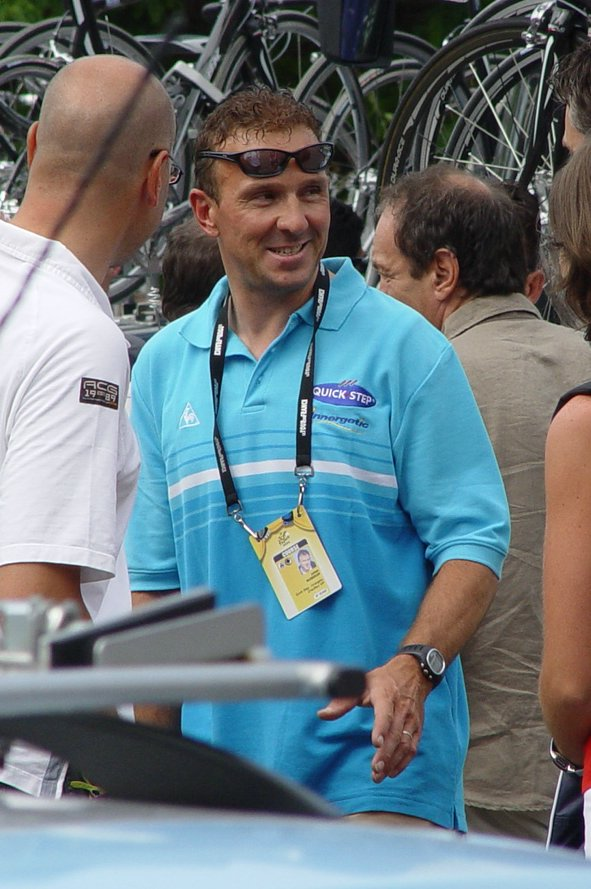
- Museeuw in 2006

Personal information
- Full name: Johan Museeuw
- Nicknames: The Lion of Flanders, De Zeemeeuw (The Seagull)
- Born: 13 October 1965 (age 61) Varsenare, Belgium
- Height: 1.84 m (6 ft 1/2 in)
- Weight: 92 kg (203 lb; 14 st 7 lb) (Note: Fluctuated from 74 kg (163 lb; 11.7 st) to 78 kg (172 lb; 12.3 st) while racing.)

Cycling career
- Sport: Cycling
- Current team: Retired
- Discipline: Road
- Role: Rider
- Rider type: Classics specialist

Professional teams
- 1988–1989: AD Renting–Mini-Flat–Enerday
- 1990–1992: Lotto
- 1993–1994: GB-MG
- 1995–2000: Mapei
- 2001–2002: Domo–Farm Frites
- 2003–2004: Quick-Step

Major wins
- Grand Tours Tour de France 2 individual stages (1990) 2 TTT stages (1993, 1994) Stage races Four Days of Dunkirk (1995, 1997) Three Days of De Panne (1997) One-day races and Classics World Road Race Championships (1996) National Road Race Championships (1992, 1996) Tour of Flanders (1993, 1995, 1998) Paris–Roubaix (1996, 2000, 2002) Züri-Metzgete (1991, 1995) E3 Prijs Vlaanderen (1992, 1998) Omloop Het Volk (2000, 2003) Paris–Tours (1993) Amstel Gold Race (1994) HEW Cyclassics (2002) Other Vélo d'Or (1996) UCI Road World Cup (1995, 1996)
Medal record
Representing Belgium
Men's road bicycle racing
World Championships
Gold medal – first place	1996 Lugano	Road race

Johan Museeuw (born 13 October 1965) is a retired Belgian professional road racing cyclist who was a professional from 1988 until 2004. Nicknamed The Lion of Flanders, he was particularly successful in the cobbled classics of Flanders and Northern France and was considered one of the best classic races specialists of the 1990s.

He won both the Tour of Flanders and Paris–Roubaix three times and was road world champion in 1996. Other notable career achievements include two individual stage wins in the Tour de France, two final classifications of the UCI Road World Cup, two national road race championships and several classic cycle races. In 1996 he received the Vélo d'Or, awarded annually to the rider considered to have performed the best over the year.

== Early life and amateur career ==
Born in Varsenare, Museeuw grew up in Gistel, West Flanders. His father Eddy had been a professional cyclist for two seasons, albeit without much success. As a junior and amateur, Museeuw practiced cyclo-cross in winter and had a few minor successes on the road.

== Professional career ==
=== 1988–1989: The early years ===
Johan Museeuw started his professional career in 1988 with ADR. In 1989 he was part of the ADR team with which Greg LeMond won his second Tour de France. During the Tour, Museeuw headed the peloton for days on end for his team leader who wore the yellow jersey as leader of the general classification.

=== 1990–1992: Sprinter ===
In 1990 he signed for the Lotto team and won two prestigious stages in the 1990 Tour de France. He won the uphill-sprint stage to Mont Saint-Michel and the final stage of the Tour in Paris, both in a mass sprint. In an era of successful breakaways, he was an unfortunate sprinter, being unable to win further individual stages.

In 1991 he won several stage wins in smaller stage races and in August he won the Championship of Zürich, his first win in a World Cup race. In 1992 he placed third in Milan–San Remo, winning the peloton sprint behind Sean Kelly and Moreno Argentin. He won E3 Harelbeke, his first cobbled semi-classic race win, and the Belgian national road race title in Peer. He was second in the final points classification of the 1992 Tour de France behind Frenchman Laurent Jalabert for the second time. He did not win a stage, despite having won every peloton sprint behind a group of escapees that year.

=== 1993–1994: First classics victories ===
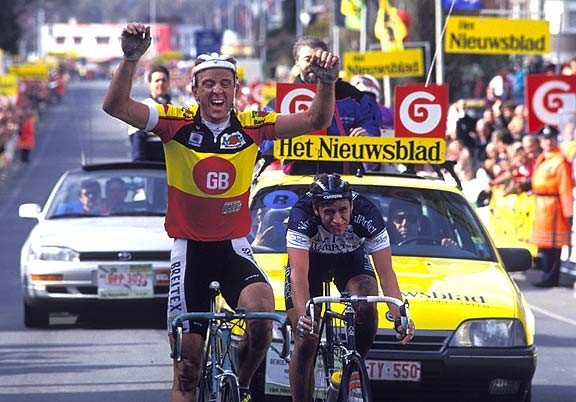
Johan Museeuw won his first Tour of Flanders in 1993.

In 1993 he moved to MG-GB, the team of manager Patrick Lefevere, with whom he developed a special friendship. With Lefevere, he converted from sprinter to classics specialist. He traded his powerful sprint for more endurance and stamina that allowed him to compete in the spring classics, specializing in the cobbled classics Paris–Roubaix and the Tour of Flanders. He had a strong spring campaign in 1993: after winning a stage in Paris–Nice and Dwars door Vlaanderen, he started as one of the favourites in the Tour of Flanders. Museeuw won the Tour of Flanders in a two-man sprint with Frans Maassen, taking his first win in a monument classic. In the 1993 Tour de France he wore the yellow jersey for two days after a strong prologue and team time trial, and he placed second in the final points classification a third time. At the end of 1993, he won Paris–Tours, taking his third World Cup win.

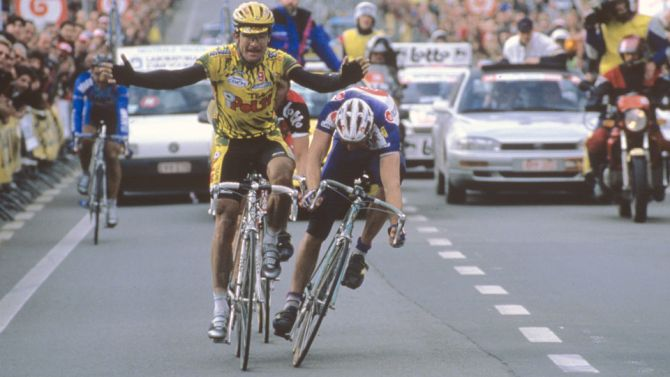
Museeuw missed his second Tour of Flanders win by 7 mm in 1994.

In 1994 he won Kuurne–Brussels–Kuurne and was a front-runner in all cobbled classics, but could win none. He narrowly missed his second victory in the Tour of Flanders, when he was beaten by Gianni Bugno in the sprint by 7 mm. One week later, in Paris–Roubaix, he was in a furious pursuit of Andrei Tchmil, but suffered a mechanical failure on the cobbles and finished 13th. He ended his spring campaign with a victory in the Amstel Gold Race after a two-man sprint with Italian Bruno Cenghialta, his fourth World Cup win. In the Tour de France, he wore the yellow jersey again for three days, before losing it to Miguel Induráin in the long time trial to Bergerac. He ended the year in sixth position of the UCI Road World Rankings.

=== 1995–1997: World Cup and World Champion ===
In 1995 his MG–GB team merged with Mapei–Clas, forming the strong Italian-Belgian Mapei team that dominated cycling's classic races in the 1990s. He won the 1995 Tour of Flanders, earning him the nickname The Lion of Flanders in the Flemish media. Later he won the Championship of Zürich and won the final standings of the 1995 World Cup, confirming his status as the best one-day classic rider of the year.

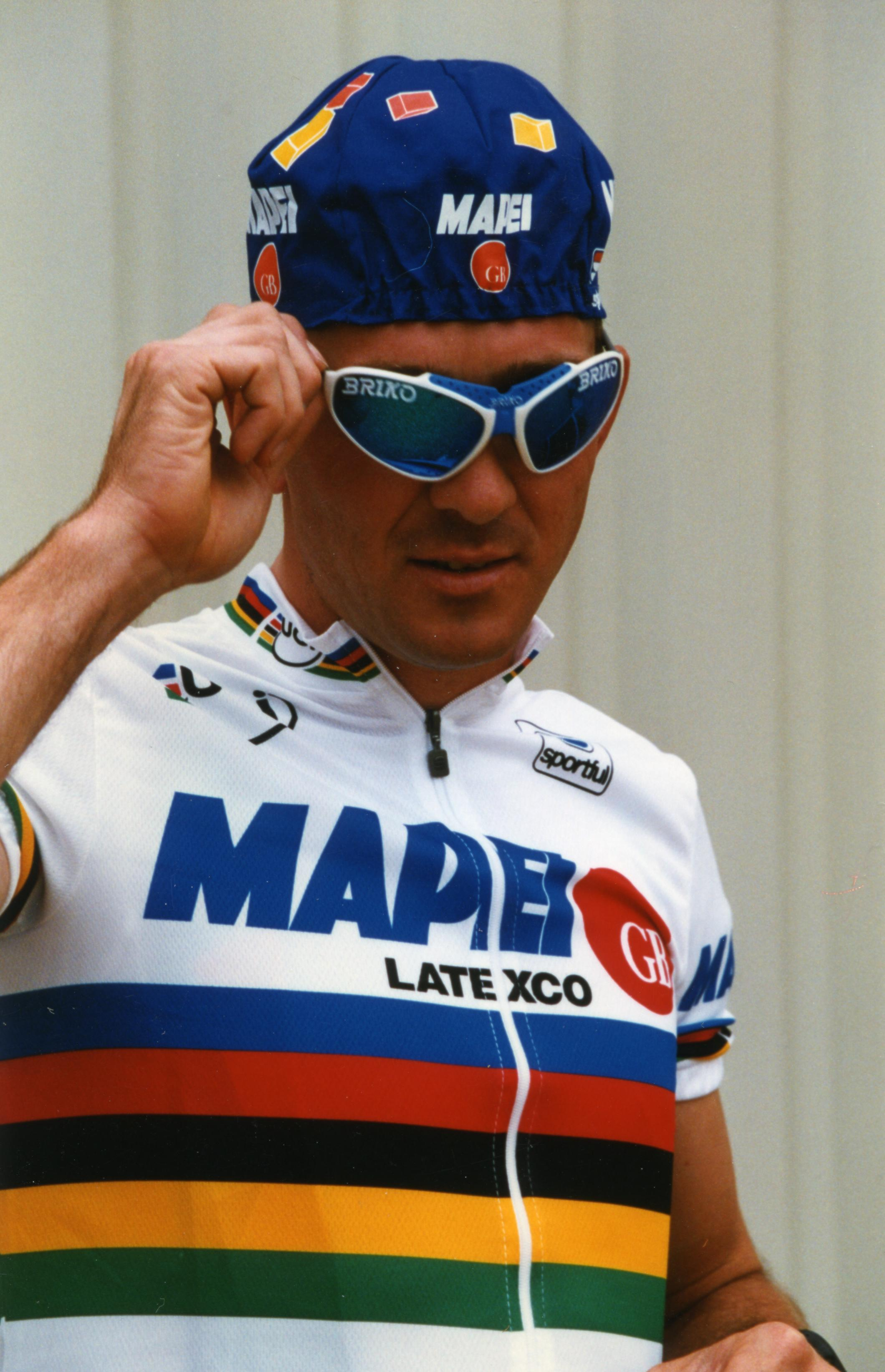
Museeuw in the rainbow jersey in 1997

In 1996 he won the Brabantse Pijl, but was third in the Tour of Flanders after suffering mechanical failure. The next week, he finally claimed his first victory in Paris–Roubaix. His Mapei–GB team dominated the race and Museeuw arrived together with his Italian teammates Gianluca Bortolami and Andrea Tafi on the Roubaix Velodrome. Team manager Patrick Lefevere received a phone call from the office of Mapei's managing director, Giorgio Squinzi, ordering Museeuw to win the race. In the summer he won his second Belgian national road race title, but again failed to win a stage in the Tour de France. After a disappointing performance in Paris–Tours, where he wanted to secure his overall lead in the World Cup, he stated he intended to quit cycling altogether. He changed his mind and started the next week in the world championship road race, where he was not considered a favourite because of the mountainous course in Lugano. To the surprise of many, and on his 31st birthday, Museeuw became world champion after a long breakaway with Mauro Gianetti, beating the Swiss in a two-man sprint. Subsequently, he went on to win his second World Cup final standing.

In 1997 Museeuw started the year with three stage wins in the Ruta del Sol and Kuurne–Brussels–Kuurne, but failed to take another World Cup win. A crash in Milan–San Remo and the Tour of Flanders and a puncture in Paris–Roubaix prevented him from achieving success. He finished sixth in Liège–Bastogne–Liège, his best result in the Ardennes classic. He abandoned in the 18th stage of the Tour de France, in the rainbow jersey, after several unsuccessful attempts to win a stage in a breakaway. He went on to defend his world title in San Sebastián, but missed the winning breakaway and finished eighth.

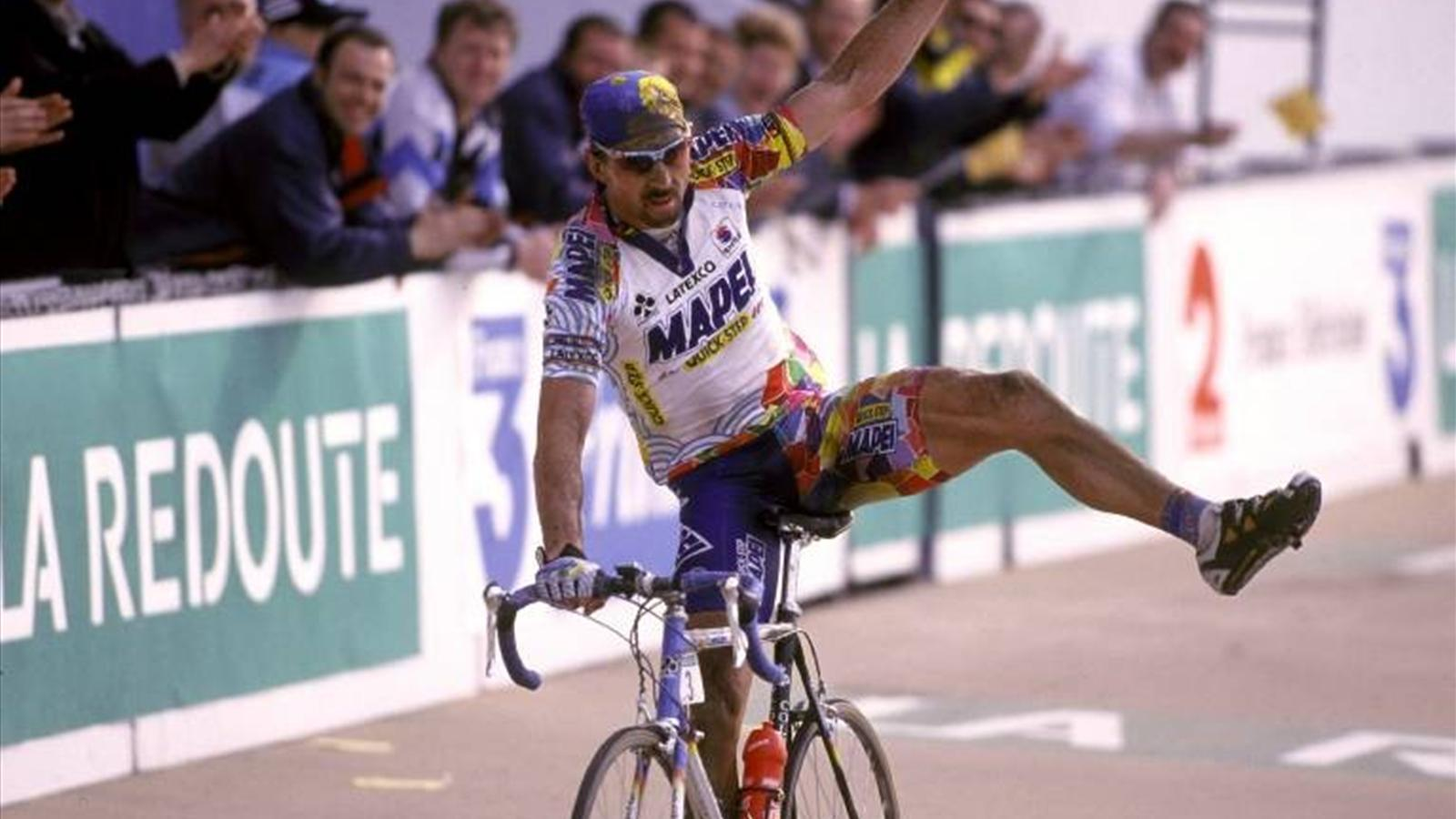
Museeuw won his second Paris–Roubaix in 2000 on the Roubaix Velodrome. He won the Hell of the North classic three times.

=== 1998–2000: Injury-ridden years ===
In 1998, one week after winning E3 Harelbeke and the Brabantse Pijl in the same weekend, he won the Tour of Flanders, thereby equaling the race's record of three wins. One week later, Museeuw made a horrific fall in Paris–Roubaix on the Trouée d'Arenberg cobbled sector, leaving his kneecap shattered. On top came a dangerous gangrene infection which nearly forced doctors to amputate his left leg. He fought back and resumed cycling after a long healing process, finishing third in the Tour of Flanders of 1999 and ninth in Paris–Roubaix, exactly one year after his horror crash. In 2000 he won Paris–Roubaix a second time after a 44 km solo. Upon crossing the finish line in victory, he lifted his left leg, pointing to his knee as a reminder of the injury that had almost ended his career two years before. Later that year, he was seriously injured while riding a motor cycle with his wife and son. He suffered severe head trauma and spent several days in a coma. All three would recover, but it was his dogged determination that saw him again reach the pinnacle of the sport. His powerful riding style won him legions of fans all over the world and made him all the more popular in his native Flanders.

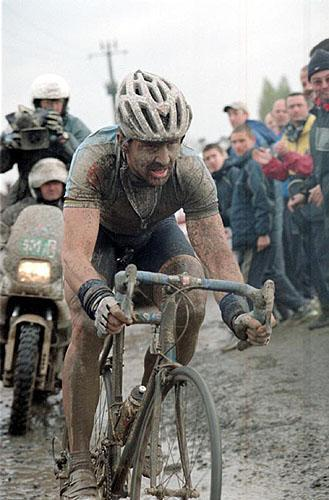
Museeuw en route for his third Paris–Roubaix win in 2002.

=== 2001–2002: Domo–Farm Frites ===
In 2001 he moved with team manager Patrick Lefevere to Domo–Farm Frites, where he worked on his comeback after his second accident. He placed second in Paris–Roubaix and fifth in the Amstel Gold Race. He started a last time in the Tour de France, but abandoned in the Pyrenees stages.

In 2002 he was back on top of his game, with a second place in the Tour of Flanders and a third victory in Paris–Roubaix. His win in the Hell classic was his tenth victory in a World Cup race. Later the same year he won the HEW Cyclassics in Hamburg, totaling 11 World Cup wins.

=== 2003–2004: Final years ===
In 2003 he followed Lefevere to the newly set up Quick-Step–Davitamon team. He won the Omloop Het Volk early in the season, but an illness obstructed his preparation for the classics. Towards the end of his career, he acted as a mentor to Tom Boonen, who was widely considered to be Museeuw's successor as leading figure in the cobbled classics. In his last years as a professional he attempted to set a new record in the cobbled classics, aiming to win the Tour of Flanders or Paris–Roubaix a fourth time, but failed. With six combined victories in the Tour of Flanders and Paris–Roubaix, he held the record of combined victories in these races until Boonen improved it in 2012.

Museeuw ended his career in the spring of 2004 after 17 years as a professional and 59 professional victories. In his last classic race, the 2004 Paris–Roubaix, he punctured 5 km before the finish while riding in the leading breakaway, thereby losing his last chance of equalling Roger De Vlaeminck's record. He finished in tears, in fifth place, together with his long-time rival Peter Van Petegem. Museeuw's last race was three days later, the Scheldeprijs in Belgium, on 14 April 2004, won by his young teammate Tom Boonen. A farewell race was organized on 2 May in his home town Gistel. After his retirement, Museeuw took up a non-riding position with Quick-Step–Innergetic. He has donated many of his trophies to museums, including the Centrum Ronde van Vlaanderen, but retains three trophies from his Tour of Flander's, Paris–Roubaix and World Championship wins.

== Doping ==
In 2003 a doping allegation surfaced in which Museeuw was implicated. Press reports insinuated the use of human growth hormone which he obtained from veterinarian José Landuyt. Police authorities claimed that Museeuw had purchased banned substances in 2003. They recorded phone conversations between Museeuw and Landuyt speaking of wasps as a codeword for Aranesp, a synthetic hormone known to increase red blood cell levels. Despite the absence of direct evidence, it was ruled in 2004 that there was sufficient argument for his athletic suspension for two years and referral to the criminal court.

On 24 January 2007, Museeuw confessed to the charges in a press conference, revealing that he had "not been completely honest in his last year as a professional, as he wanted to end his career in style", and announcing his resignation from his Quick Step team.

In December 2008 Museeuw was convicted for doping offences by a Belgian Court, together with former cyclists Jo Planckaert and Chris Peers who were involved in the same affair. Museeuw was given a 10-month suspended sentence, a fine of €2.500 and further litigations.

In September 2012 Museeuw gave an interview for Flemish newspaper Gazet van Antwerpen, stating that "nearly every rider of his generation doped", thereby implicitly confessing to the true extent of his doping use. He also stated that he is convinced the current generation of riders is "the cleanest cycling has ever seen". In 2018, he expressed concerns that, although comfortable about discussing former doping offences, he worries "if we keep talking about [doping], the new generation cannot show that they are different".

== Career achievements ==
=== Major results ===
Road

1989
2nd GP Impanis
2nd Grand Prix d'Isbergues
3rd Overall Tour of Belgium

1st Stage 5

3rd Paris–Tours
1990
Tour de France

1st Stages 4 & 21

1st Grand Prix de Plumelec-Morbihan
2nd Overall Three Days of De Panne

1st Stage 3b

1st Stage 1 Four Days of Dunkirk
1st Stage 1 Tour de l'Oise
2nd Overall Nissan Classic

1st Stage 3

2nd Gent–Wevelgem
3rd Scheldeprijs
9th Milan–San Remo
9th Amstel Gold Race
1991
1st Züri-Metzgete
1st Kampioenschap van Vlaanderen
Vuelta a Andalucía

1st Stages 2 & 5

1st Stage 3b Midi Libre
1st Stage 2 Tour of Britain
2nd Tour of Flanders
2nd Rund um den Henninger-Turm
3rd Overall Four Days of Dunkirk

1st Stage 4

3rd Overall Nissan Classic

1st Stage 3

3rd Paris–Brussels
5th UCI Road World Rankings
9th Paris–Tours
10th Overall Vuelta a Aragón
10th Amstel Gold Race
1992
1st Road race, National Road Championships
1st E3 Prijs Vlaanderen
Volta a la Comunitat Valenciana

1st Stages 1 & 2

1st Stage 5 Vuelta a Andalucía
1st Stage 1 Bicicleta Vasca
1st Stage 1b Vuelta a Asturias
1st Stage 2 Tre Valli Varesine
2nd Amstel Gold Race
2nd Scheldeprijs
2nd Grote Prijs Jef Scherens
2nd Circuito de Getxo
3rd Milan–San Remo
3rd Kuurne–Brussels–Kuurne
7th UCI Road World Rankings
7th Paris–Roubaix
8th UCI Road World Cup
1993
1st Tour of Flanders
1st Paris–Tours
1st Dwars door België
1st Stage 4 (TTT) Tour de France
1st Stage 1 Tour de Suisse
1st Stage 4 Paris–Nice
1st Stage 4 Hofbrau Cup
2nd UCI Road World Cup
2nd Le Samyn
3rd Paris–Brussels
4th Paris–Roubaix
6th UCI Road World Rankings
8th Wincanton Classic
1994
1st Amstel Gold Race
1st Kuurne–Brussels–Kuurne
1st Stage 3 (TTT) Tour de France
1st Stage 8 Tour de Suisse
1st Stage 1a Tour Méditerranéen
1st Teleport Derny Amsterdam
2nd UCI Road World Cup
2nd Tour of Flanders
2nd Züri-Metzgete
2nd Binche–Chimay–Binche
2nd GP Impanis-Van Petegem
3rd Gent–Wevelgem
6th UCI Road World Rankings
1995
1st UCI Road World Cup
1st Overall Four Days of Dunkirk

1st Stage 4

1st Tour of Flanders
1st Züri-Metzgete
1st Omloop de Vlaamse Ardennen
1st Trofeo Laigueglia
1st Druivenkoers Overijse
1st Grand Prix Eddy Merckx
1st Kampioenschap van Vlaanderen
3rd Paris–Roubaix
3rd Clásica de San Sebastián
3rd Road race, National Road Championships
4th UCI Road World Rankings
5th Leeds Classic
7th Amstel Gold Race
8th Rund um den Henninger-Turm
1996
1st UCI Road World Cup
1st Road race, UCI Road World Championships
1st Road race, National Road Championships
1st Paris–Roubaix
1st Brabantse Pijl
1st Omloop Mandel-Leie-Schelde
1st Stage 1 Giro di Puglia
2nd Paris–Brussels
3rd Tour of Flanders
3rd Amstel Gold Race
3rd Leeds Classic
3rd Züri-Metzgete
4th UCI Road World Rankings
6th Grand Prix des Nations
8th Milan–San Remo
10th Road race, Olympic Games
1997
1st Overall Four Days of Dunkirk

1st Stage 3b (ITT)

1st Overall Three Days of De Panne
1st Kuurne–Brussels–Kuurne
1st LuK Challenge Chrono (with Oskar Camenzind)
2nd Overall Vuelta a Andalucía

1st Stages 2, 4 & 5

2nd Time trial, National Road Championships
2nd Scheldeprijs
3rd Paris–Roubaix
6th Liège–Bastogne–Liège
7th Grand Prix des Nations
9th UCI Road World Rankings
1998
1st Tour of Flanders
1st E3 Prijs Vlaanderen
1st Brabantse Pijl
1999
1st Dwars door België
1st Omloop Mandel-Leie-Schelde
2nd Kuurne–Brussels–Kuurne
3rd Tour of Flanders
4th HEW Cyclassics
6th UCI Road World Cup
9th Paris–Roubaix
2000
1st Paris–Roubaix
1st Omloop Het Volk
1st Brabantse Pijl
3rd Gent–Wevelgem
2001
2nd Paris–Roubaix
5th Amstel Gold Race
9th UCI Road World Cup
2002
1st Paris–Roubaix
1st HEW Cyclassics
1st Stage 3 Tour de Wallonie
1st Profronde van Almelo
2nd UCI Road World Cup
2nd Tour of Flanders
3rd E3 Harelbeke
4th Overall Guldensporentweedaagse

1st Stage 2

5th Classic Haribo
7th Druivenkoers Overijse
9th Dwars door Vlaanderen
10th Gent–Wevelgem
2003
1st Omloop Het Volk
1st Stage 3 Danmark Rundt
3rd Memorial Rik Van Steenbergen
7th Gent–Wevelgem
2004
5th Paris–Roubaix

=== Monuments results timeline ===
Monument	1989	1990	1991	1992	1993	1994	1995	1996	1997	1998	1999	2000	2001	2002	2003	2004
Milan–San Remo	—	9	—	3	32	12	40	8	40	36	—	15	80	—	—	—
Tour of Flanders	62	—	2	14	1	2	1	3	13	1	3	33	16	2	38	15
Paris–Roubaix	—	12	16	7	4	13	3	1	3	DNF	9	1	2	1	33	5
Liège–Bastogne–Liège	—	—	—	36	12	58	13	—	6	—	—	90	DNF	DNF	—	—
Giro di Lombardia	—	—	—	—	—	—	—	13	—	—	—	—	—	—	—	—

Legend
—	Did not compete
DNF	Did not finish

Criteriums

1988
1st GP Briek Schotte
1989
1st GP Deutsche Weinstrasse
1st Criterium Oostende
1st Criterium Deerlijk
1990
1st Criterium Aalst
1st Criterium Dilsen
1st Criterium Valkenswaard
1st Criterium Lichtervelde
1991
1st Criterium De Haan
1st Criterium Deerlijk
1st Criterium Bavikhove
1992
1st Criterium Bellegem
1st Criterium Peer
1993
1st GP Wielerrevue
1st Criterium Hengeloo
1st Criterium Bavikhove
1994
1st Criterium Made
1st Wielsbeke
1st Geraardsbergen
1st Druivenkoers Overijse
1995
1st Criterium Bavikhove
1st Criterium Graz
1997
1st Criterium Peer
1st Criterium Kortrijk
1st Criterium Karlsruhe
1st Gala Tour de France
1999
1st Criterium Bavikhove
1st GP Briek Schotte
2001
1st Dernycriterium Wilrijk
2002
1st Profronde van Made
2004
1st Afscheidscriterium Johan Museeuw

== Honours and awards ==
- Crystal Bicycle Best Professional Cyclist: 1993, 1995, 1996, 1997, 2002
- Vlaamse Reus: 1995
- Sprint d'Or: 1995, 1996, 1997, 2002
- Belgian National Sports Merit Award: 1996
- Vélo d'Or Mondial: 1996
- Swiss Mendrisio d'Or: 1996
- Bici al Chiodo Award: 1996
- Honorary Citizen of Jabbeke: 1996
- Officer in the Belgian Order of Leopold: 2004
- Johan Museeuw Classics: from 2018

== See also ==
- List of doping cases in cycling
- List of sportspeople sanctioned for doping offences
