= Wilfried Peeters =

Belgian cyclist (born 1964)

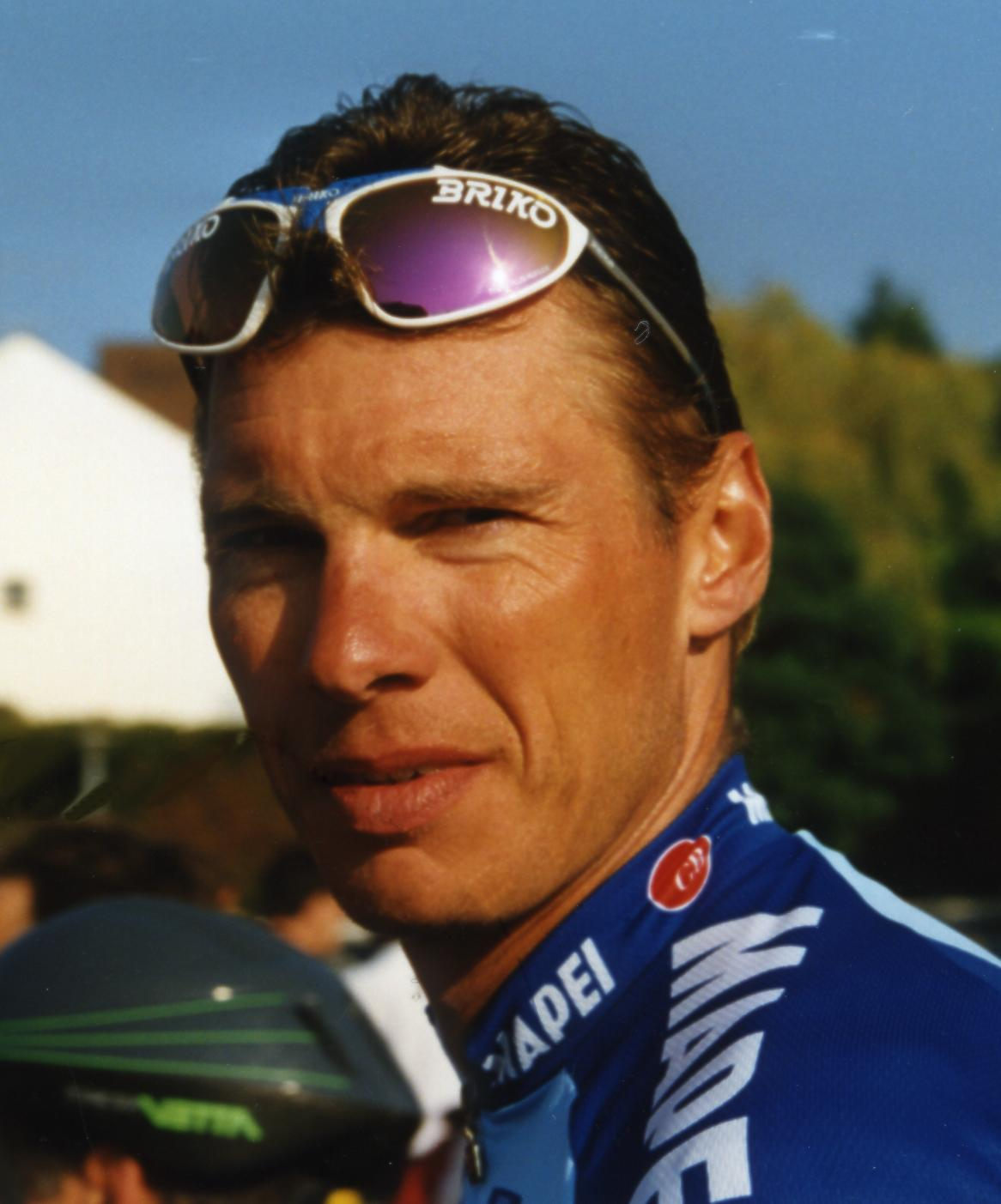

Personal information
- Full name: Wilfried Peeters
- Nickname: de Fitte
- Born: 10 July 1964 (age 62) Mol, Belgium
- Height: 1.85 m (6 ft 1 in)
- Weight: 78 kg (172 lb; 12 st 4 lb)

Cycling career
- Sport: Cycling
- Discipline: Road
- Role: Rider
- Rider type: Classics specialist

Professional teams
- 1986–1991: Sigma
- 1992: Telekom
- 1993: Bianchi-Freetime
- 1993–1994: GB-MG Maglifico
- 1995–2000: Mapei-GB
- 2001: Domo-Farm Frites

Major wins
- Grand Tours Tour de France 2 TTT stages (1993, 1994) Stage races Driedaagse van West-Vlaanderen (1999) One-day races and Classics Gent–Wevelgem (1994) Nationale Sluitingsprijs (1998)

Wilfried Peeters (born 10 July 1964 in Mol) is a former Belgian professional road bicycle racer. Nowadays, he is sporting director of the Quick Step team. During his cycling-career, he was a major help for Johan Museeuw in classics such as the Tour of Flanders and Paris–Roubaix.

== Major results ==
1986
2nd Manx Trophy
1987
3rd Grote Prijs Jef Scherens
7th Binche-Tournai-Binche
8th Grand Prix d'Ouverture La Marseillaise
1988
7th Paris–Tours
9th Brabantse Pijl
9th Grand Prix de Rennes
1989
3rd Grand Prix de la Libération
8th Brabantse Pijl
1990
1st Grote Prijs Jef Scherens
2nd Kampioenschap van Vlaanderen
5th E3-Prijs Vlaanderen
6th Ronde van Limburg
6th Omloop Mandel
9th Scheldeprijs
9th De Kustpijl
1991
3rd Belgian National Road Race Championships
5th Grand Prix Impanis
6th Paris–Roubaix
8th Dwars door België
10th Overall Étoile de Bessèges
10th Grand Prix de la Libération
1992
1st Schaal Sels
2nd Rund um Köln
5th Veenendaal–Veenendaal
6th Grote 1-MeiPrijs
1993
1st Stage 2a (TTT) Hofbräu Cup
1st Stage 4 (TTT) Tour de France
3rd Grote Prijs Jef Scherens
4th Dwars door België
1994
1st Gent–Wevelgem
1st Stage 1 (TTT) Tour Méditerranéen
1st Stage 3 (TTT) Tour de France
6th Flèche Hesbignonne
8th Druivenkoers Overijse
8th Grote Prijs Jef Scherens
9th Veenendaal–Veenendaal
1995
1st Flèche Hesbignonne
3rd Kampioenschap van Vlaanderen
5th Nationale Sluitingsprijs
6th Schaal Sels
6th Omloop Mandel
8th Brabantse Pijl
9th Dwars door België
1996
1st Omloop der Vlaamse Ardennen
2nd Overall Three Days of De Panne
3rd Omloop Mandel
4th Belgian National Road Race Championships
6th Omloop Het Volk
6th Paris–Brussels
7th Dwars door België
8th Druivenkoers Overijse
9th Scheldeprijs
10th Kuurne–Brussels–Kuurne
10th Eschborn–Frankfurt
1997
1st Stage 1 Four Days of Dunkirk
2nd HEW Cyclassics
4th Belgian National Road Race Championships
4th Grand Prix de Fourmies
5th Kuurne–Brussels–Kuurne
6th Vuelta a Andalucía
6th E3-Prijs Vlaanderen
1998
1st Nationale Sluitingsprijs
2nd Druivenkoers Overijse
3rd Paris–Roubaix
4th Brabantse Pijl
5th Trofeo Sóller
6th Grand Prix de Fourmies
10th E3-Prijs Vlaanderen
10th Tour of Flanders
1999
1st Overall Driedaagse van West-Vlaanderen

1st Stage 2

2nd Omloop Het Volk
2nd Paris–Roubaix
3rd Grote Prijs Stad Zottegem
4th Grand Prix Eddy Merckx (with Johan Museeuw)
2000
3rd Nationale Sluitingsprijs
4th Grote Prijs Stad Sint-Niklaas
5th Brabantse Pijl
5th Belgian National Road Race Championships
7th Grand Prix Eddy Merckx (with Leif Hoste)
10th Omloop Mandel
2001
1st Grote Prijs Briek Schotte
2nd Dwars door Vlaanderen
5th Paris–Roubaix
9th Overall Vuelta a Andalucía
