= Mapei (cycling team) =

Italian cycling team (1993–2002)

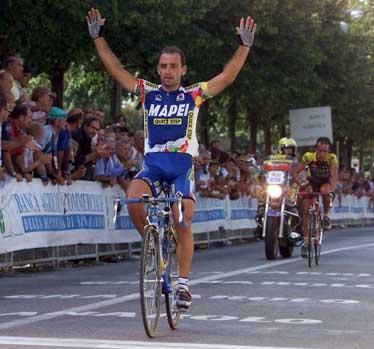
- Paolo Bettini in a Mapei jersey in 2001

Team information
- UCI code: ~~MAP~~
- Registered: Italy (1993–1997); Belgium (1998–2002)
- Founded: 1993
- Disbanded: 2002
- Discipline: Road
- Bicycles: Viner (1993); Colnago (1994–2002)

Key personnel
- Team managers: Giuseppe Saronni (1997–1998); Patrick Lefevere (1999–2000); Alvaro Crespi (2000–2002)

Team name history
- 1993 1994 1995–1997 1998 1999–2002: Mapei; Mapei–Clas; Mapei–GB; Mapei–Bricobi; Mapei–Quick Step
Mapei jersey
Jersey

Mapei was an Italian-based road bicycle racing team active from 1993 to 2002, named after sponsoring firm Mapei.

Mapei was one of the strongest teams during the late 1990s, and ranked as the strongest UCI team in 1994–2000 and 2002.

== History ==
While started in 1993 (taking the Eldor-Viner team midseason), the Mapei team already became an international top team one year later when it merged with the Spanish Clas-Cajastur for the 1994 season. Clas had been a cycling sponsor since the 1988 Clas-Razesa team, led by José Manuel Fuente Lavandera. Among the Clas-riders who joined the Italian Mapei team were Fernando Escartín, Abraham Olano and, most prominently, Swiss top rider Tony Rominger. Other newly signed riders included Franco Ballerini, Gianluca Bortolami, Andrea Tafi and Mauro Gianetti, forming a Spanish-Italian top team with two strong Swiss riders as well.

Already in 1995, Clas stopped sponsoring, being replaced by GB. GB had previously sponsored the Italian MG–Maglificio team, which has had success in the early nineties in part due to a Flemish influence. Along with the new sponsor came team manager Patrick Lefevere and top rider Johan Museeuw, marking the beginning of the Belgian influence of the successful Mapei team in the following years, although the team would always have some strong Spanish riders. Another new rider in 1995 was Frank Vandenbroucke, who joined from the Lotto team.

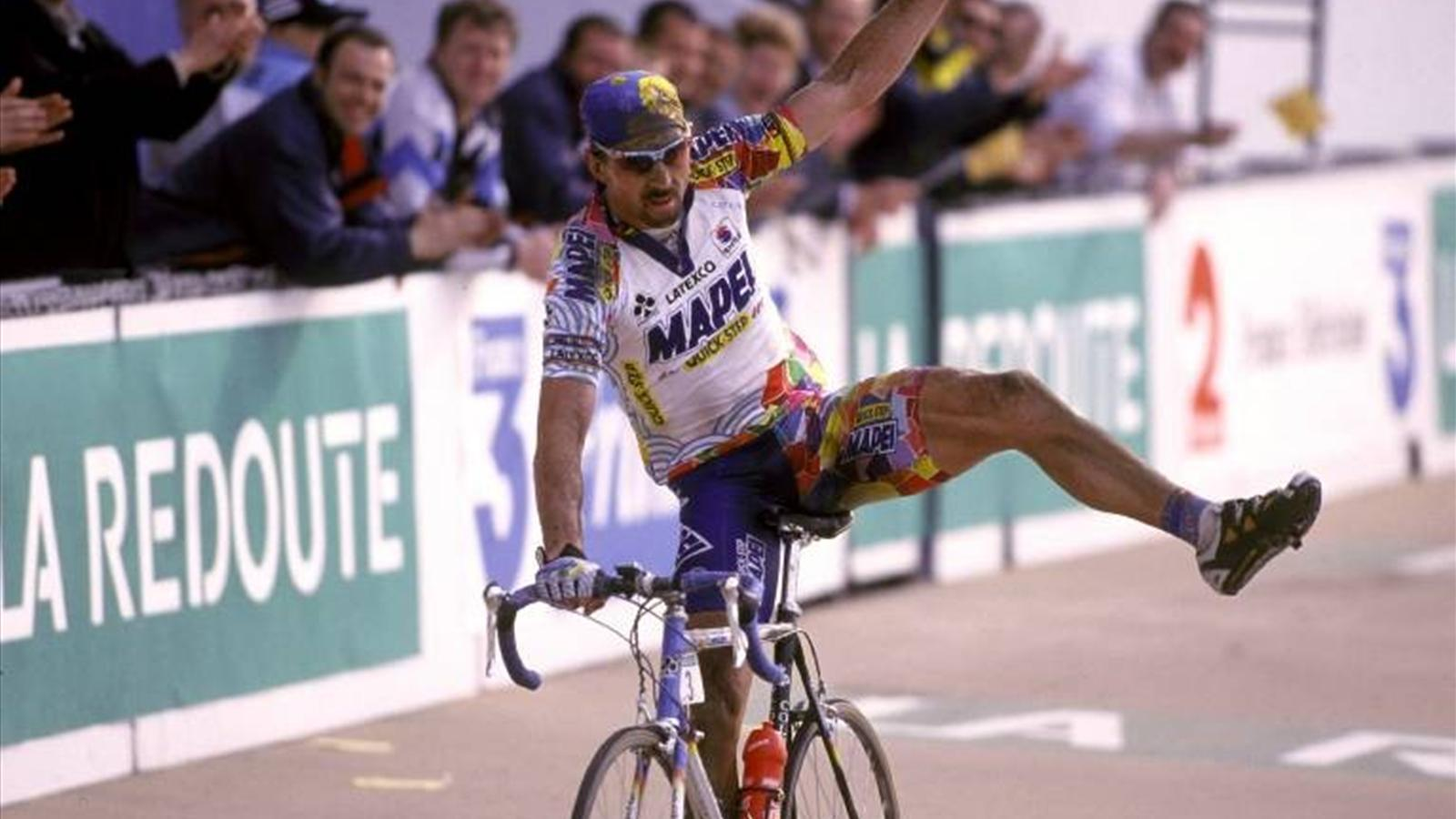
Johan Museeuw celebrating victory at the 2000 Paris-Roubaix

In the remainder of the 1990s, Mapei would celebrate many major successes, usually in the one-day classics. The team had the great Belgian and Italian classic specialists of the 1990s such as Johan Museeuw, Michele Bartoli, Andrea Tafi, Franco Ballerini, and had Patrick Lefevere as directeur sportif and then manager. The team won Paris–Roubaix five times. Three times (1996, 1998 and 1999) the team even won the first three places. In the 1996 edition, the sprint for the line was decided 15 km from the finish. Directeur sportif Patrick Lefevere, who was following the race in the team car, talked with the owner of Mapei, Giorgio Squinzi (in Milan), who said that Museeuw was to win the race. Gianluca Bortolami was second while Andrea Tafi was third. In 1998 Franco Ballerini won the race with over four minutes ahead of his two teammates Tafi and Wilfried Peeters. and in 1999 Tafi won with an advantage of two minutes over teammates Peeters and Tom Steels. In the summer of 2000, Lefevre announced that the Belgian part of the Mapei team would be leaving the team to form a new team called Domo–Farm Frites which had Museeuw as team captain. As a result, there was a great rivalry between the two teams.

Mapei was less dominating in the Grand Tours. The only true stage race specialist was Tony Rominger, who won the 1994 Vuelta a España and the 1995 Giro d'Italia for the team. As Rominger focused on the Tour de France in 1996, Abraham Olano was given the leadership role at the Giro d'Italia in 1996. Olano took the maglia rosa but lost it in the mountains and during the Tour, Rominger lost time in the mountains. The team never played a major role in the Tour de France.

From 2003 Mapei dropped their sponsorship, and a new team was built on top of the old with the name of Quick-Step–Davitamon.

== Team names ==
The official names of the team changed with the cosponsors several times. The team has run under the following names: Mapei (1993) Mapei–Clas (1994), Mapei–GB (1995–1997), Mapei–Bricobi (1998), Mapei–Quickstep (1999–2002).

== Jerseys ==
The Mapei team jersey was first produced by Parentini and featured numerous colourful cubes from the main sponsor's product packaging. In the team's second year, Sportful (owned by Manifattura Valcismon S.p.A.) provided all technical garments from 1994 until the penultimate year, when Santini SMS took over in the final year.

== World and national champions ==
1994
Spain National Road Race championships, Abraham Olano
Spain National Time Trial championships, Abraham Olano
1995
World Road Race championships, Abraham Olano
1996
Spain National Road Race championships, Manuel Fernández
Belgium National Road Race championships, Johan Museeuw
World Road Race championships, Johan Museeuw
1997
Italy National Road Race championships, Gianni Faresin
Switzerland National Road Race championships, Oscar Camenzind
Belgium National Road Race championships, Tom Steels
1998
Belgium National road Race championships, Tom Steels
Italy National road Race championships, Andrea Tafi
Czech Republic National Road Race championships, Ján Svorada
World Road Race championships, Oscar Camenzind
2000
Italy National Road Race championships, Michele Bartoli
Hungary National Road Race championships, László Bodrogi
Belgium National Road Race championships, Axel Merckx
USA National Road Race championships, Fred Rodriguez
Hungary National Time Trial championships, László Bodrogi
2001
Italy National Road Race championships, Daniele Nardello
Hungary National Time Trial championships, László Bodrogi
World Road Race championships, Óscar Freire
2002
Belgium National Road Race championships, Tom Steels
Hungary National Time Trial championships, László Bodrogi
Switzerland National Time Trial championships, Fabian Cancellara

== UCI Ranking ==
Season	Rank
1993	21
1994	1
1995	1
1996	1
1997	1
1998	1
1999	1
2000	1
2001	4
2002	1
