= TVM (cycling team) =

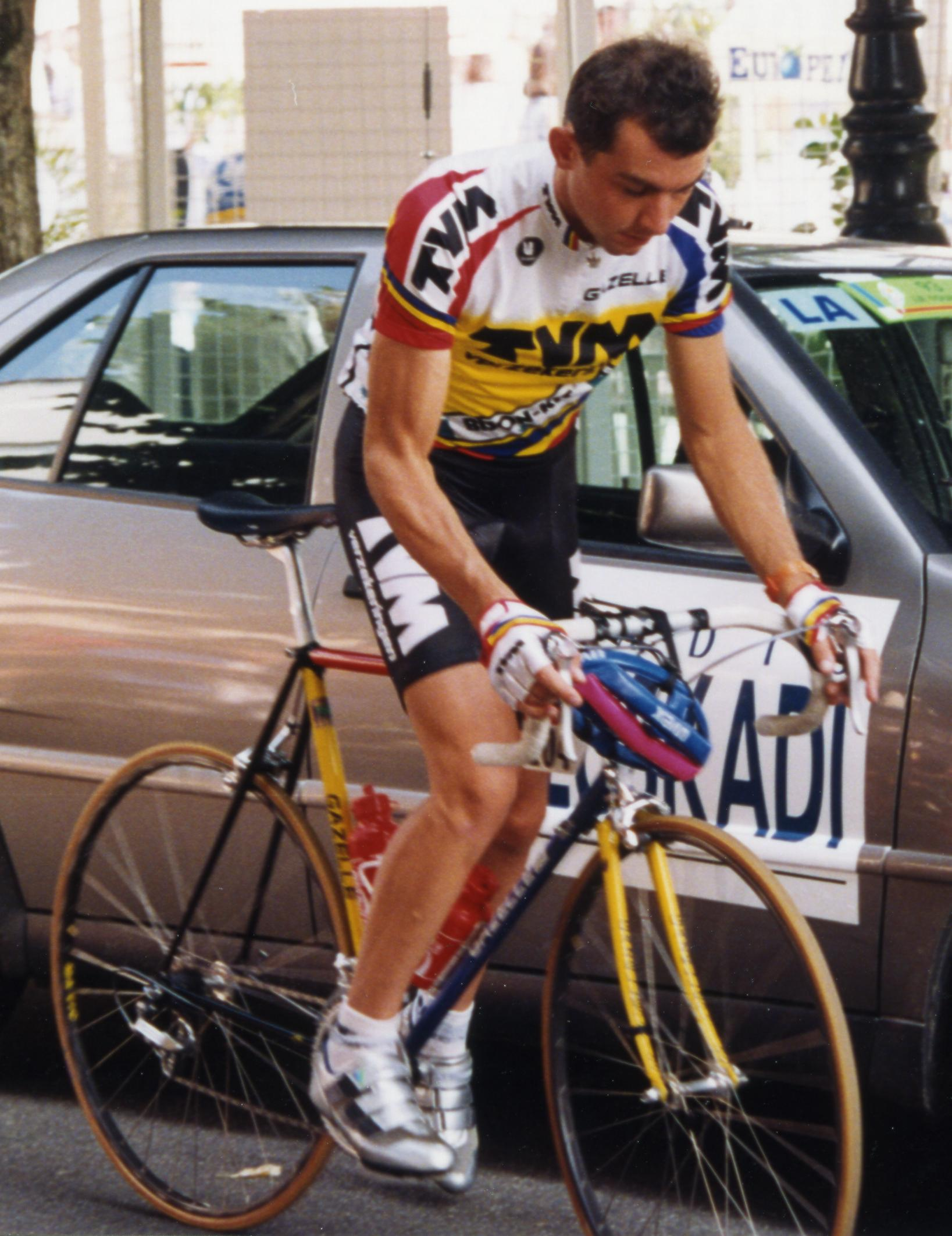
- Maarten den Bakker riding for TVM at the 1993 Tour de France

Team information
- Registered: Netherlands
- Founded: 1988
- Disbanded: 2000
- Discipline: Road

Team name history
- 1988 1989 1990 1991–1992 1993–1994 1995 1996–1999 2000: TVM–Van Schilt; TVM–Ragno; TVM; TVM–Sanyo; TVM–Bison Kit; TVM–Polis Direct; TVM–Farm Frites; Farm Frites

TVM was a Dutch road bicycle racing team. It folded in 2000, two years after suffering a doping scandal. Farm Frites continued as a sponsor in 2001 with the new team, Domo–Farm Frites–Latexco.

== Major wins ==
1988
Brabantse Pijl, Johan Capiot
1989
Brabantse Pijl, Johan Capiot
Stage 17 Giro d'Italia, Phil Anderson
1990
Omloop Het Volk, Johan Capiot
Stage 4b Giro d'Italia, Phil Anderson
1991

Stage 3 & 7 Vuelta a España, Jesper Skibby

1992
Omloop Het Volk, Johan Capiot
Nokere Koerse, Johan Capiot
Brabantse Pijl, Johan Capiot
Stage 3 Tour de France, Rob Harmeling
1993
Stage 15 Vuelta a España, Dag Otto Lauritzen
Stage 5 Tour de France, Jesper Skibby
1994
Clásica de Almería, Johan Capiot
Stage 4 Tirreno–Adriatico, Jesper Skibby
Stage 17 Vuelta a España, Bart Voskamp
Stage 8 Tour de France, Bo Hamburger
1995
Stage 6 Tour de France, Jeroen Blijlevens
Stage 9 Vuelta a España, Jesper Skibby
Stage 10 Vuelta a España, Jeroen Blijlevens
1996
Dwars door Vlaanderen, Tristan Hoffman
Stage 6 Tour de France, Jeroen Blijlevens
Stage 19 Tour de France, Bart Voskamp
Stage 5 Vuelta a España, Jeroen Blijlevens
1997
Omloop Het Volk, Peter Van Petegem
Stage 7 Tour de France, Jeroen Blijlevens
Stage 1 Vuelta a España, Lars Michaelsen
Stage 8 Vuelta a España, Bart Voskamp
1998
Omloop Het Volk, Peter Van Petegem
Scheldeprijs, Servais Knaven
Stage 12 Giro d'Italia, Laurent Roux
Stage 5 Tour de France, Jeroen Blijlevens
Stages 2 & 5 Vuelta a España, Jeroen Blijlevens
1999
Nokere Koerse, Jeroen Blijlevens
Stage 7 Tirreno–Adriatico, Steven de Jongh
E3 Prijs Vlaanderen, Peter Van Petegem
Tour of Flanders, Peter Van Petegem
Scheldeprijs, Jeroen Blijlevens
Stages 3 & 7 Giro d'Italia, Jeroen Blijlevens
Stage 10 Vuelta a España, Serhiy Utchakov
Stage 21 Vuelta a España, Jeroen Blijlevens
2000
Stage 1 Tour Down Under, Koos Moerenhout
Stage 6 Tour Down Under, Robbie McEwen
E3 Prijs Vlaanderen, Serguei Ivanov
Gent–Wevelgem, Geert Van Bondt
Stage 3 Post Danmark Rundt, Geert Van Bondt
Stage 2 Vuelta a España, Jans Koerts
Tour of Leuven, Dave Bruylandts
Grand Prix d'Isbergues, Peter Van Petegem

== Notable riders ==
Name	Born	Nationality	Previous	Enter	Left	Afterwards
Phil Anderson	1958	Australia	Panasonic	1988	1990	Motorola
Johan Capiot	1964	Belgium	Roland	1988	2000	(none)
Jesper Skibby	1964	Denmark	Roland	1989	1997	Team CSC
Gert-Jan Theunisse	1963	Netherlands	Panasonic	1991	1994	Collstrop-Lystex
Steven Rooks	1960	Netherlands	Festina	1994	1995	(none)
Bo Hamburger	1970	Denmark	(none)	1991	1997	Casino-C’est Votre Équipe
Philippa York^{[a]}	1958	United Kingdom	Z-Peugeot	1992	1994	Le Groupement
Maarten den Bakker	1969	Netherlands	PDM	1992	1997	Rabobank
Tristan Hoffman	1970	Netherlands	(none)	1992	1999	Team CSC
Bart Voskamp	1968	Netherlands	(none)	1993	1999	Team Polti
Servais Knaven	1971	Netherlands	(none)	1993	2000	Domo-Farm Frites
Jeroen Blijlevens	1971	Netherlands	(none)	1994	1999	Team Polti
Steven de Jongh	1973	Netherlands	(none)	1995	1999	Rabobank
Peter Van Petegem	1970	Belgium	Trident	1995	2000	Mercury-Viatel
Steffen Kjærgaard	1973	Norway	(none)	1996	1997	Team Chicky World
Lars Michaelsen	1969	Denmark	Festina	1997	1998	FDJ
Sergei Ivanov	1975	Russia	Lada-Samara	1997	2000	Fassa Bortolo
Jan van Wijk	1962	Netherlands	Panasonic-Isostar	1989	1990	(none)

== Notes ==
^{a} Competed as Robert Millar
