= 2001 UCI Road World Cup =

- Thirteenth edition of the UCI Road World Cup

Details
- Dates: 24 March – 20 October
- Location: Europe
- Races: 10

Champions
- Individual champion: Erik Dekker (NED) (Rabobank)
- Teams' champion: Rabobank

The 2001 UCI Road World Cup was the thirteenth edition of the UCI Road World Cup.

== Races ==
Date	Race	Country	Winner	Team	World Cup Leader	Leader's Team	Report
March 24	Milan–San Remo	Italy	Erik Zabel (GER)	Team Telekom	Erik Zabel (GER)	Team Telekom	Report
April 8	Tour of Flanders	Belgium	Gianluca Bortolami (ITA)	Tacconi Sport–Vini Caldirola	Gianluca Bortolami (ITA)	Tacconi Sport–Vini Caldirola	Report
April 15	Paris–Roubaix	France	Servais Knaven (NED)	Domo-Farm Frites	Romans Vainsteins (LAT)	Domo-Farm Frites	Report
April 22	Liège–Bastogne–Liège	Belgium	Oscar Camenzind (SUI)	Lampre–Daikin	Romans Vainsteins (LAT)	Domo-Farm Frites	Report
April 28	Amstel Gold Race	Netherlands	Erik Dekker (NED)	Rabobank	Erik Dekker (NED)	Rabobank	Report
August 11	Clásica de San Sebastián	Spain	Laurent Jalabert (FRA)	CSC–Tiscali	Erik Dekker (NED)	Rabobank	Report
August 19	HEW Cyclassics	Germany	Erik Zabel (GER)	Team Telekom	Erik Dekker (NED)	Rabobank	Report
August 26	Züri-Metzgete	Switzerland	Paolo Bettini (ITA)	Mapei–Quick-Step	Erik Dekker (NED)	Rabobank	Report
October 7	Paris–Tours	France	Richard Virenque (FRA)	Domo-Farm Frites	Erik Dekker (NED)	Rabobank	Report
October 20	Giro di Lombardia	Italy	Danilo Di Luca (ITA)	Cantina Tollo–Acqua & Sapone	Erik Dekker (NED)	Rabobank	Report

== Single races details ==
worldcupjersey	Denotes the Classification Leader

In the race results the leader jersey identify the rider who wore the jersey in the race (the leader at the start of the race).

In the general classification table the jersey identify the leader after the race.

24 March 2001 — Milan–San Remo 287 km (178.3 mi)

	Rider	Team	Time
1	Erik Zabel (GER)	Team Telekom	7h 23' 13"
2	Mario Cipollini (ITA)	Saeco	s.t.
3	Romāns Vainšteins (LAT)	Domo–Farm Frites–Latexco	s.t.
4	Biagio Conte (ITA)	Saeco	s.t.
5	Paolo Bettini (ITA)	Mapei–Quick-Step	s.t.
6	Gabriele Colombo (ITA)	Cantina Tollo–Acqua & Sapone	s.t.
7	Gabriele Balducci (ITA)	Tacconi Sport–Vini Caldirola	s.t.
8	Markus Zberg (SWI)	Rabobank	s.t.
9	George Hincapie (USA)	U.S. Postal Service	s.t.
10	Rolf Sørensen (DEN)	CSC–Tiscali	s.t.

General classification after Milan–San Remo

	Rider	Team	Points
1	Erik Zabel (GER)	Team Telekom	100
2	Mario Cipollini (ITA)	Saeco	70
3	Romāns Vainšteins (LAT)	Domo–Farm Frites–Latexco	50
4	Biagio Conte (ITA)	Saeco	40
5	Paolo Bettini (ITA)	Mapei–Quick-Step	36
6	Gabriele Colombo (ITA)	Cantina Tollo–Acqua & Sapone	32
7	Gabriele Balducci (ITA)	Tacconi Sport–Vini Caldirola	28
8	Markus Zberg (SWI)	Rabobank	24
9	George Hincapie (USA)	U.S. Postal Service	20
10	Rolf Sørensen (DEN)	CSC–Tiscali	16

8 April 2001 — Tour of Flanders 269 km (167.1 mi)

	Rider	Team	Time
1	Gianluca Bortolami (ITA)	Tacconi Sport–Vini Caldirola	6h 10' 23"
2	Erik Dekker (NED)	Rabobank	s.t.
3	Denis Zanette (ITA)	Liquigas–Pata	s.t.
4	Rolf Sørensen (DEN)	CSC–Tiscali	s.t.
5	Daniele Nardello (ITA)	Mapei–Quick-Step	s.t.
6	Chris Peers (BEL)	Cofidis	s.t.
7	Maximilian Sciandri (GBR)	Lampre–Daikin	s.t.
8	Ludo Dierckxsens (BEL)	Lampre–Daikin	s.t.
9	Andrei Tchmil (BEL)	Lotto–Adecco	+ 19"
10	Romans Vainsteins (LAT)	Domo–Farm Frites–Latexco	s.t.

General classification after Tour of Flanders

	Rider	Team	Points
1	Gianluca Bortolami (ITA)	Tacconi Sport–Vini Caldirola	100
2	Erik Zabel (GER)	Team Telekom	100
3	Erik Dekker (NED)	Rabobank	75
4	Mario Cipollini (ITA)	Saeco	70
5	Romāns Vainšteins (LAT)	Domo–Farm Frites–Latexco	66
6	Rolf Sørensen (DEN)	CSC–Tiscali	56
7	Denis Zanette (ITA)	Liquigas–Pata	50
8	Biagio Conte (ITA)	Saeco	40
9	Gabriele Balducci (ITA)	Tacconi Sport–Vini Caldirola	40
10	Paolo Bettini (ITA)	Mapei–Quick-Step	39

15 April 2001 — Paris–Roubaix 254.5 km (158.1 mi)

	Rider	Team	Time
1	Servais Knaven (NED)	Domo–Farm Frites–Latexco	6h 45' 00"
2	Johan Museeuw (BEL)	Domo–Farm Frites–Latexco	+ 34"
3	Romāns Vainšteins (LAT)	Domo–Farm Frites–Latexco	+ 41"
4	George Hincapie (USA)	U.S. Postal Service	s.t.
5	Wilfried Peeters (BEL)	Domo–Farm Frites–Latexco	s.t.
6	Ludo Dierckxsens (BEL)	Lampre–Daikin	s.t.
7	Steffen Wesemann (GER)	Team Telekom	s.t.
8	Andrei Tchmil (BEL)	Lotto–Adecco	+ 2' 35"
9	Chris Peers (BEL)	Cofidis	s.t.
10	Rolf Sørensen (DEN)	CSC–Tiscali	+ 2' 59"

General classification after Paris–Roubaix

	Rider	Team	Points
1	Romāns Vainšteins (LAT)	Domo–Farm Frites–Latexco	116
2	Gianluca Bortolami (ITA)	Tacconi Sport–Vini Caldirola	111
3	Servais Knaven (NED)	Domo–Farm Frites–Latexco	101
4	Erik Zabel (GER)	Team Telekom	100
5	Johan Museeuw (BEL)	Domo–Farm Frites–Latexco	80
6	Erik Dekker (NED)	Rabobank	75
7	George Hincapie (USA)	U.S. Postal Service	73
8	Rolf Sørensen (DEN)	CSC–Tiscali	72
9	Mario Cipollini (ITA)	Saeco	70
10	Denis Zanette (ITA)	Liquigas–Pata	58

22 April 2001 — Liège–Bastogne–Liège 258 km (160.3 mi)

	Rider	Team	Time
1	Oscar Camenzind (SUI)	Lampre–Daikin	6h 42' 38"
2	Davide Rebellin (ITA)	Liquigas–Pata	s.t.
3	David Etxebarria (ESP)	Euskaltel–Euskadi	s.t.
4	Francesco Casagrande (ITA)	Fassa Bortolo	s.t.
5	Michael Boogerd (NED)	Rabobank	s.t.
6	Raimondas Rumšas (LTU)	Lampre–Daikin	+ 25"
7	Marcos Serrano (ESP)	ONCE–Eroski	s.t.
8	Erik Dekker (NED)	Rabobank	s.t.
9	Markus Zberg (SUI)	Rabobank	s.t.
10	Beat Zberg (SUI)	Rabobank	s.t.

General classification after Liège–Bastogne–Liège

	Rider	Team	Points
1	Romāns Vainšteins (LAT)	Domo–Farm Frites–Latexco	116
2	Gianluca Bortolami (ITA)	Tacconi Sport–Vini Caldirola	111
3	Servais Knaven (NED)	Domo–Farm Frites–Latexco	101
4	Oscar Camenzind (SUI)	Lampre–Daikin	100
5	Erik Zabel (GER)	Team Telekom	100
6	Erik Dekker (NED)	Rabobank	99
7	Johan Museeuw (BEL)	Domo–Farm Frites–Latexco	80
8	George Hincapie (USA)	U.S. Postal Service	73
9	Rolf Sørensen (DEN)	CSC–Tiscali	72
10	Davide Rebellin (ITA)	Liquigas–Pata	70

28 April 2001 — Amstel Gold Race 257 km (159.7 mi)

	Rider	Team	Time
1	Erik Dekker (NED)	Rabobank	6h 39' 13"
~~2~~	~~Lance Armstrong (USA)~~	U.S. Postal Service	s.t.
3	Serge Baguet (BEL)	Lotto–Adecco	+ 17"
4	Markus Zberg (SUI)	Rabobank	s.t.
5	Johan Museeuw (BEL)	Domo–Farm Frites–Latexco	s.t.
6	Peter Van Petegem (BEL)	Mercury–Viatel	+ 20"
7	Michele Bartoli (ITA)	Mapei–Quick-Step	s.t.
8	Davide Rebellin (ITA)	Liquigas–Pata	s.t.
9	Michael Boogerd (NED)	Rabobank	s.t.
10	Chris Peers (BEL)	Cofidis	s.t.

General classification after Amstel Gold Race

	Rider	Team	Points
1	Erik Dekker (NED)	Rabobank	199
2	Gianluca Bortolami (ITA)	Tacconi Sport–Vini Caldirola	121
3	Johan Museeuw (BEL)	Domo–Farm Frites–Latexco	116
4	Romāns Vainšteins (LAT)	Domo–Farm Frites–Latexco	116
5	Oscar Camenzind (SUI)	Lampre–Daikin	112
6	Servais Knaven (NED)	Domo–Farm Frites–Latexco	101
7	Erik Zabel (GER)	Team Telekom	100
8	Davide Rebellin (ITA)	Liquigas–Pata	94
9	Markus Zberg (SUI)	Rabobank	88
10	George Hincapie (USA)	U.S. Postal Service	73

11 August 2001 — Clásica de San Sebastián 228 km (141.7 mi)

	Rider	Team	Time
1	Laurent Jalabert (FRA)	CSC–Tiscali	5h 17' 54"
2	Francesco Casagrande (ITA)	Fassa Bortolo	s.t.
3	Davide Rebellin (ITA)	Liquigas–Pata	s.t.
4	Wladimir Belli (ITA)	Fassa Bortolo	s.t.
5	Serge Baguet (BEL)	Lotto–Adecco	+ 26"
6	Stefano Garzelli (ITA)	Mapei–Quick-Step	+ 34"
7	Piotr Wadecki (POL)	Domo–Farm Frites–Latexco	s.t.
8	Andrea Ferrigato (ITA)	Alessio	s.t.
9	Erik Dekker (NED)	Rabobank	s.t.
10	Javier Pascual Llorente (ESP)	Kelme–Costa Blanca	s.t.

General classification after Clásica de San Sebastián

	Rider	Team	Points
1	Erik Dekker (NED)	Rabobank	219
2	Davide Rebellin (ITA)	Liquigas–Pata	144
3	Oscar Camenzind (SUI)	Lampre–Daikin	126
4	Gianluca Bortolami (ITA)	Tacconi Sport–Vini Caldirola	121
5	Johan Museeuw (BEL)	Domo–Farm Frites–Latexco	116
6	Romāns Vainšteins (LAT)	Domo–Farm Frites–Latexco	116
7	Francesco Casagrande (ITA)	Fassa Bortolo	113
8	Servais Knaven (NED)	Domo–Farm Frites–Latexco	101
9	Erik Zabel (GER)	Team Telekom	100
10	Serge Baguet (BEL)	Lotto–Adecco	90

19 August 2001 — HEW Cyclassics 250.8 km (155.8 mi)

	Rider	Team	Time
1	Erik Zabel (GER)	Team Telekom	5h 59' 02"
2	Romāns Vainšteins (LAT)	Domo–Farm Frites–Latexco	s.t.
3	Erik Dekker (NED)	Rabobank	s.t.
4	Fabrizio Guidi (ITA)	Mercury–Viatel	s.t.
5	Andrej Hauptman (SLO)	Tacconi Sport–Vini Caldirola	s.t.
6	Paolo Bettini (ITA)	Mapei–Quick-Step	s.t.
7	Igor Astarloa (ESP)	Mercatone Uno–Stream TV	s.t.
8	Fabio Baldato (ITA)	Fassa Bortolo	s.t.
9	Werner Riebenbauer (AUT)	Team Nürnberger	s.t.
10	Sven Teutenberg (GER)	Festina	s.t.

General classification after HEW Cyclassics

	Rider	Team	Points
1	Erik Dekker (NED)	Rabobank	269
2	Erik Zabel (GER)	Team Telekom	200
3	Romāns Vainšteins (LAT)	Domo–Farm Frites–Latexco	186
4	Davide Rebellin (ITA)	Liquigas–Pata	156
5	Gianluca Bortolami (ITA)	Tacconi Sport–Vini Caldirola	130
6	Oscar Camenzind (SUI)	Lampre–Daikin	126
7	Johan Museeuw (BEL)	Domo–Farm Frites–Latexco	116
8	Francesco Casagrande (ITA)	Fassa Bortolo	113
9	Servais Knaven (NED)	Domo–Farm Frites–Latexco	101
10	Serge Baguet (BEL)	Lotto–Adecco	96

26 August 2001 — Züri-Metzgete 248.4 km (154.3 mi)

	Rider	Team	Time
1	Paolo Bettini (ITA)	Mapei–Quick-Step	6h 17' 48"
2	Jan Ullrich (GER)	Team Telekom	s.t.
3	Fernando Escartín (ESP)	Team Coast–Buffalo	s.t.
4	Francesco Casagrande (ITA)	Fassa Bortolo	s.t.
5	Erik Dekker (NED)	Rabobank	+ 21"
6	Cristian Moreni (ITA)	Mercatone Uno–Stream TV	s.t.
7	Marco Serpellini (ITA)	Lampre–Daikin	+ 1' 04"
8	Niki Aebersold (SUI)	Team Coast–Buffalo	+ 1' 09"
9	Mario Aerts (BEL)	Lotto–Adecco	+ 1' 12"
10	George Hincapie (USA)	U.S. Postal Service	+ 1' 20"

General classification after Züri-Metzgete

	Rider	Team	Points
1	Erik Dekker (NED)	Rabobank	305
2	Erik Zabel (GER)	Team Telekom	200
3	Romāns Vainšteins (LAT)	Domo–Farm Frites–Latexco	197
4	Paolo Bettini (ITA)	Mapei–Quick-Step	195
5	Davide Rebellin (ITA)	Liquigas–Pata	170
6	Francesco Casagrande (ITA)	Fassa Bortolo	153
7	Oscar Camenzind (SUI)	Lampre–Daikin	141
8	Gianluca Bortolami (ITA)	Tacconi Sport–Vini Caldirola	130
9	Johan Museeuw (BEL)	Domo–Farm Frites–Latexco	116
10	Servais Knaven (NED)	Domo–Farm Frites–Latexco	101

7 October 2001 — Paris–Tours 254.5 km (158.1 mi)

	Rider	Team	Time
1	Richard Virenque (FRA)	Domo–Farm Frites–Latexco	6h 58' 32"
2	Óscar Freire (ESP)	Mapei–Quick-Step	+ 2"
3	Erik Zabel (GER)	Team Telekom	s.t.
4	Thor Hushovd (NOR)	Crédit Agricole	s.t.
5	Andrej Hauptman (SLO)	Tacconi Sport–Vini Caldirola	s.t.
6	Romāns Vainšteins (LAT)	Domo–Farm Frites–Latexco	s.t.
7	Alessandro Petacchi (ITA)	Fassa Bortolo	s.t.
8	Jaan Kirsipuu (EST)	AG2R Prévoyance	s.t.
9	Niko Eeckhout (BEL)	Lotto–Adecco	s.t.
10	Zbigniew Spruch (POL)	Lampre–Daikin	s.t.

General classification after Paris–Tours

	Rider	Team	Points
1	Erik Dekker (NED)	Rabobank	318
2	Erik Zabel (GER)	Team Telekom	250
3	Romāns Vainšteins (LAT)	Domo–Farm Frites–Latexco	219
4	Paolo Bettini (ITA)	Mapei–Quick-Step	195
5	Davide Rebellin (ITA)	Liquigas–Pata	170
6	Francesco Casagrande (ITA)	Fassa Bortolo	153
7	Oscar Camenzind (SUI)	Lampre–Daikin	141
8	Gianluca Bortolami (ITA)	Tacconi Sport–Vini Caldirola	130
9	Johan Museeuw (BEL)	Domo–Farm Frites–Latexco	116
10	Servais Knaven (NED)	Domo–Farm Frites–Latexco	101

20 October 2001 — Giro di Lombardia 256 km (159.1 mi)

	Rider	Team	Time
1	Danilo Di Luca (ITA)	Cantina Tollo–Acqua & Sapone	6h 38' 29"
2	Giuliano Figueras (ITA)	Ceramiche Panaria–Fiordo	s.t.
3	Michael Boogerd (NED)	Rabobank	+ 1"
4	Richard Virenque (FRA)	Domo–Farm Frites–Latexco	+ 4"
5	Michele Bartoli (ITA)	Fassa Bortolo	+ 1' 25"
6	Beat Zberg (SUI)	Rabobank	s.t.
7	Max Sciandri (GBR)	Lampre–Daikin	+ 1' 26"
8	Wladimir Belli (ITA)	Fassa Bortolo	+ 1' 27"
9	Niklas Axelsson (SWE)	Alessio	+ 1' 32"
10	Francisco Mancebo (ESP)	iBanesto.com	+ 2' 25"

General classification after Giro di Lombardia

	Rider	Team	Points
1	Erik Dekker (NED)	Rabobank	331
2	Erik Zabel (GER)	Team Telekom	250
3	Romāns Vainšteins (LAT)	Domo–Farm Frites–Latexco	229
4	Paolo Bettini (ITA)	Mapei–Quick-Step	201
5	Davide Rebellin (ITA)	Liquigas–Pata	170
6	Francesco Casagrande (ITA)	Fassa Bortolo	156
7	Oscar Camenzind (SUI)	Lampre–Daikin	141
8	Gianluca Bortolami (ITA)	Tacconi Sport–Vini Caldirola	130
9	Johan Museeuw (BEL)	Domo–Farm Frites–Latexco	116
10	Michele Bartoli (ITA)	Fassa Bortolo	101

== Final standings ==
=== Individual ===
Points are awarded to the top 25 classified riders. Riders must start at least 6 races to be classified.

The points are awarded for every race using the following system:

Position	1st	2nd	3rd	4th	5th	6th	7th	8th	9th	10th	11th	12th	13th	14th	15th	16th	17th	18th	19th	20th	21st	22nd	23rd	24th	25th
Points	100	70	50	40	36	32	28	24	20	16	15	14	13	12	11	10	9	8	7	6	5	4	3	2	1

Pos.	Rider	Team	MSR	ToF	ROU	LBL	AGR	CSS	HEW	ZUR	TOU	LOM	Pts.
1	Erik Dekker (NED)	Rabobank	5	70	DNS	24	100	20	50	36	13	13	331
2	Erik Zabel (GER)	Team Telekom	100	0	0	DNS	0	DNS	100	DNS	50	DNS	250
3	Romans Vainsteins (LAT)	Domo–Farm Frites–Latexco	50	16	50	DNS	0	0	70	11	32	0	229
4	Paolo Bettini (ITA)	Mapei–Quick-Step	36	3	DNS	11	0	13	32	100	DNS	6	201
5	Davide Rebellin (ITA)	Liquigas–Pata	0	DNS	DNS	70	24	50	12	14	DNS	0	170
6	Francesco Casagrande (ITA)	Fassa Bortolo	3	DNS	DNS	40	DNS	70	0	40	DNS	3	156
7	Oscar Camenzind (SUI)	Lampre–Daikin	0	DNS	DNS	100	12	14	0	15	DNS	DNS	141
8	Gianluca Bortolami (ITA)	Tacconi Sport–Vini Caldirola	0	100	11	0	10	0	9	0	DNS	DNS	130
9	Johan Museeuw (BEL)	Domo–Farm Frites–Latexco	0	10	70	0	36	0	0	DNS	0	DNS	116
10	Michele Bartoli (ITA)	Mapei–Quick-Step	15	11	DNS	0	28	8	3	0	0	36	101
11	Serge Baguet (BEL)	Lotto–Adecco	DNS	DNS	DNS	4	50	36	6	0	0	0	96
12	George Hincapie (USA)	U.S. Postal Service	20	13	40	DNS	0	0	DNS	16	DNS	DNS	89
13	Marcus Zberg (SUI)	Rabobank	24	4	DNS	20	40	0	0	0	DNS	DNS	88
14	Rolf Sorensen (DEN)	CSC–Tiscali	16	40	16	DNS	0	DNS	0	DNS	0	0	72
15	Maximilian Sciandri (GBR)	Lampre–Daikin	1	28	14	DNS	0	DNS	0	0	0	28	71
16	Chris Peers (BEL)	Cofidis	0	32	20	DNS	16	0	0	0	0	0	68
17	Andrei Tchmil (BEL)	Lotto–Adecco	0	20	24	0	9	0	0	0	11	0	64
18	Peter Van Petegem (BEL)	Mercury–Viatel	13	0	2	13	32	DNS	0	DNS	0	DNS	60
19	Mirko Celestino (ITA)	Saeco	10	0	DNS	DNS	0	11	14	12	DNS	11	58
20	Beat Zberg (SUI)	Rabobank	0	DNS	DNS	16	0	0	DNS	9	DNS	32	57
Race winners not eligible for general classification
Pos.	Rider	Team	MSR	ToF	ROU	LBL	AGR	CSS	HEW	ZUR	TOU	LOM	Pts.
-	Richard Virenque (FRA)	Domo–Farm Frites–Latexco	DNS	DNS	DNS	DNS	DNS	DNS	DNS	10	100	40	150
-	Servais Knaven (NED)	Domo–Farm Frites–Latexco	0	1	100	DNS	0	DNS	0	DNS	DNS	DNS	101
-	Danilo Di Luca (ITA)	Cantina Tollo–Acqua & Sapone	0	DNS	DNS	DNS	DNS	DNS	DNS	DNS	DNS	100	100
-	Laurent Jalabert (FRA)	CSC–Tiscali	DNS	DNS	DNS	DNS	DNS	100	DNS	0	DNS	DNS	100

Key
Colour	Result
Gold	Winner
Silver	2nd place
Bronze	3rd place
Green	Top ten position
Blue	Other points position
Purple	Out of points, retired
Red	Did not start (DNS)

=== Teams ===
Points are awarded to the top 10 teams. Teams must start at least 8 races to be classified. The first 18 teams in world ranking must start in all races.

The points are awarded for every race using the following system:

Position	1st	2nd	3rd	4th	5th	6th	7th	8th	9th	10th
Points	12	9	8	7	6	5	4	3	2	1

Pos.	Team	MSR	ToF	ROU	LBL	AGR	CSS	HEW	ZUR	TOU	LOM	Pts.
1	Rabobank	4	7	4	12	12	0	9	8	5	12	73
2	Domo–Farm Frites–Latexco	0	6	12	0	8	6	8	9	7	8	64
3	Mapei–Quick-Step	1	9	3	2	0	9	7	12	6	6	55
4	Fassa Bortolo	3	1	0	9	0	8	6	0	9	9	45
5	Lampre–Daikin	0	12	6	4	0	7	2	7	3	0	41
