= 1997 Three Days of De Panne =

Race details
- Dates: 1 April–3 April 1997
- Stages: 3
- Distance: 524.2 km (325.7 mi)
- Winning time: 11h 51' 36"

Results
	Winner	Johan Museeuw (BEL)
	Second	Carlo Bomans (BEL)
	Third	Marco Milesi (ITA)

The 1997 Three Days of De Panne was the 21st edition of the Three Days of De Panne cycle race and was held on 31 March to 2 April 1997. The race started in Harelbeke and finished in De Panne. The race was won by Johan Museeuw.

== General classification ==
Final general classification

Rank	Rider	Time
1	Johan Museeuw (BEL)	11h 51' 36"
2	Carlo Bomans (BEL)	+ 7"
3	Marco Milesi (ITA)	+ 49"
4	Denis Zanette (ITA)	+ 1' 12"
5	Bert Dietz (GER)	+ 1' 51"
6	Hans De Clercq (BEL)	+ 2' 12"
7	Tom Desmet (BEL)	+ 2' 20"
8	Andrei Tchmil (UKR)	+ 5' 13"
9	Fabrizio Guidi (ITA)	s.t.
10	Emmanuel Magnien (FRA)	+ 5' 45"
