= 2003 Tour of Flanders =

Race details
- Dates: 6 April 2003
- Stages: 1
- Distance: 254 km (158 mi)
- Winning time: 6h 18' 48"

Results
	Winner	Peter Van Petegem (BEL)	(Lotto–Domo)
	Second	Frank Vandenbroucke (BEL)	(Quick Step)
	Third	Stuart O'Grady (AUS)	(Crédit Agricole)

The 87th running of the Tour of Flanders cycling race in Belgium was held on Sunday 6 April 2003. Belgian Peter Van Petegem won his second victory in the monument classic. The race started in Bruges and finished in Meerbeke (Ninove).

== Race Summary ==
Previous winner Jacky Durand was in an early breakaway with Michael Rich, Thomas Liese and Vincent van der Kooij. They were caught by a group of eight, consisting only of Italians, at 60 km from the finish, before the peloton returned at 30 km. Peter Van Petegem attacked on Tenbosse, followed by 10 others, heading to the Muur van Geraardsbergen. On the Muur, 16 km before the finish, Van Petegem broke clear with Frank Vandenbroucke, pushing on to the finish. Van Petegem beat his fellow Belgian in a two-man sprint. Australian Stuart O'Grady won the sprint for third place.

== Climbs ==
There were 19 categorized climbs:

- Nokereberg
- Molenberg
- Wolvenberg
- Kluisberg
- Knokteberg
- Oude Kwaremont
- Paterberg
- Koppenberg
- Steenbeekdries
- Taaienberg
- Ladeuze
- Boigneberg
- Foreest
- Steenberg
- Leberg
- Berendries
- Tenbosse
- Muur-Kapelmuur
- Bosberg

== Results ==
	Cyclist	Team	Time
1	Peter Van Petegem (BEL)	Lotto–Domo	6h 18' 48"
2	Frank Vandenbroucke (BEL)	Quick-Step	+ 2"
3	Stuart O'Grady (AUS)	Crédit Agricole	+ 19"
4	Fabio Baldato (ITA)	Alessio	s.t.
5	Nico Mattan (BEL)	Cofidis	s.t.
6	Frédéric Guesdon (FRA)	La Française des Jeux	s.t.
7	Sergei Ivanov (RUS)	Fassa Bortolo	s.t.
8	Viatcheslav Ekimov (RUS)	US Postal Service	s.t.
9	Michael Boogerd (NED)	Rabobank	s.t.
10	Dave Bruylandts (BEL)	Marlux–Wincor Nixdorf	s.t.
