= 1999 Tour of Flanders =

Race details
- Dates: 4 April 1999
- Stages: 1
- Distance: 270 km (167.8 mi)
- Winning time: 6h 15' 00"

Results
	Winner	Peter Van Petegem (BEL)	(TVM)
	Second	Frank Vandenbroucke (BEL)	(Cofidis)
	Third	Johan Museeuw (BEL)	(Mapei-Quick Step)

The 83rd running of the Tour of Flanders' cycling race in Belgium was held on Sunday 4 April 1999. It was the second leg of the UCI Road World Cup. Belgian Peter Van Petegem won his first victory in the monument classic. The race started in Bruges and finished in Meerbeke (Ninove).

== Race summary ==
Frank Vandenbroucke attacked 150 from the finish with his Cofidis team, but he crashed on the Molenberg and his team mate Philippe Gaumont crashed on the Paddestraat, causing the pack to catch them again on the Oude Kwaremont. Michele Bartoli and Vandenbroucke tried to break clear on the Paterberg and Leberg, but were given little space. A group of eleven was at the foot of the Muur van Geraardsbergen, when Vandenbroucke crashed again, causing everyone to halt except for Peter Van Petegem and Johan Museeuw. Van Petegem and Museeuw continued to work together and only Frank Vandenbroucke, the strongest man in the race, managed to bridge the gap on the Bosberg. Van Petegem tried to break clear in the final kilometer, but Vandenbroucke caught him again. Van Petegem beat Vandenbroucke and Museeuw in a three-man sprint, leading to the first completely Belgian podium in 17 years.

== Climbs ==
There were sixteen categorized climbs:

- Den Ast
- Achterberg
- Wolvenberg
- Molenberg
- Kluisberg
- Knokteberg
- Oude Kwaremont
- Paterberg
- Kortekeer
- Taaienberg
- Eikenberg
- Leberg
- Berendries
- Tenbosse
- Muur-Kapelmuur
- Bosberg

== Results ==
	Cyclist	Team	Time
1	Peter Van Petegem (BEL)	TVM	6h 15' 00"
2	Frank Vandenbroucke (BEL)	Cofidis	s.t.
3	Johan Museeuw (BEL)	Mapei-Quick Step	+ 1"
4	Michele Bartoli (ITA)	Mapei-Quick Step	+ 8"
5	Zbigniew Spruch (POL)	Lampre-Daikin	s.t.
6	Markus Zberg (SUI)	Rabobank	s.t.
7	Andrei Tchmil (BEL)	Lotto-Adecco	s.t.
8	Tristan Hoffman (NED)	TVM	s.t.
9	Denis Zanette (ITA)	Team Polti	s.t.
10	Lars Michaelsen (DEN)	La Française des Jeux	s.t.
