= 1997 Dwars door België =

Race details
- Dates: 26 March 1997
- Stages: 1
- Distance: 203 km (126.1 mi)
- Winning time: 4h 50' 00"

Results
	Winner	Andrei Tchmil (RUS)
	Second	Ludovic Auger (FRA)
	Third	Hans De Clercq (BEL)

The 1997 Dwars door België was the 52nd edition of the Dwars door Vlaanderen cycle race and was held on 26 March 1997. The race started and finished in Waregem. The race was won by Andrei Tchmil.

== General classification ==
Final general classification

Rank	Rider	Time
1	Andrei Tchmil (UKR)	4h 50' 00"
2	Ludovic Auger (FRA)	+ 10"
3	Hans De Clercq (BEL)	+ 44"
4	Lars Michaelsen (DEN)	+ 44"
5	Martin Hvastija (SLO)	+ 44"
6	Peter Van Petegem (BEL)	+ 44"
7	Léon van Bon (NED)	+ 44"
8	Jo Planckaert (BEL)	+ 44"
9	Wim Vansevenant (BEL)	+ 1' 23"
10	Geert Van Bondt (BEL)	+ 1' 28"
