= 1999 Three Days of De Panne =

Race details
- Dates: 30 March–1 April 1999
- Stages: 3
- Distance: 427 km (265 mi)
- Winning time: 10h 04' 17"

Results
	Winner	Peter Van Petegem (BEL)
	Second	Frank Vandenbroucke (BEL)
	Third	Denis Zanette (ITA)

The 1999 Three Days of De Panne was the 23rd edition of the Three Days of De Panne cycle race and was held on 30 March to 1 April 1999. The race started in Mouscron and finished in De Panne. The race was won by Peter Van Petegem.

== General classification ==
Final general classification

Rank	Rider	Time
1	Peter Van Petegem (BEL)	10h 04' 17"
2	Frank Vandenbroucke (BEL)	+ 5"
3	Denis Zanette (ITA)	+ 19"
4	Rolf Sørensen (DEN)	+ 20"
5	Servais Knaven (NED)	+ 24"
6	Emmanuel Magnien (FRA)	+ 25"
7	Erik Dekker (NED)	+ 29"
8	Maarten den Bakker (NED)	+ 33"
9	Ralf Grabsch (GER)	+ 43"
10	Nicolaj Bo Larsen (DEN)	+ 45"
