= Vansevenant =

Vansevenant is a surname. Notable people with the surname include:

- Mauri Vansevenant (born 1999), Belgian cyclist, son of Wim
- Wim Vansevenant (born 1971), Belgian cyclist, father of Mauri
