= 2001 Tour of Flanders =

Race details
- Dates: 8 April 2001
- Stages: 1
- Distance: 269 km (167.1 mi)
- Winning time: 6h 10' 23"

Results
	Winner	Gianluca Bortolami (ITA)	(Tacconi Sport-Vini Caldirola)
	Second	Erik Dekker (NED)	(Rabobank)
	Third	Denis Zanette (ITA)	(Liquigas)

The 85th edition of the Tour of Flanders cycling classic in Belgium took place on 8 April 2001. It was won by Italian Gianluca Bortolami before Erik Dekker and Dennis Zanette.

== Route ==
The race started on the Market Square in Bruges and finished in Meerbeke, covering 269 km.

There were sixteen categorized climbs:

- Achterberg
- Wolvenberg
- Molenberg
- Grotenberge
- Kluisberg
- Knokteberg
- Oude Kwaremont
- Paterberg
- Kortekeer
- Taaienberg
- Eikenberg
- Leberg
- Berendries
- Tenbosse
- Muur-Kapelmuur
- Bosberg

== Race Summary ==
Cycling News remarked that Bortolami won the race by outfoxing the favorites:

Tacconi-Sport's Gianluca Bortolami has won the 85th Ronde van Vlaanderen, beating Erik Dekker (Rabobank) and Denis Zanette (Liquigas) in an eight man sprint. The former World Cup winner rode an intelligent race, saving everything for the finale while the stronger riders wore each other out. He also profited from the lack of co-operation between the favourites (Tchmil, Museeuw, Bartoli, Vainsteins etc.), who were in a chasing group but not willing to close it down.

== Final standings ==
	Cyclist	Team	Time
1	Gianluca Bortolami (ITA)	Tacconi Sport–Vini Caldirola	6h 10' 23"
2	Erik Dekker (NED)	Rabobank	s.t.
3	Denis Zanette (ITA)	Liquigas–Pata	s.t.
4	Rolf Sørensen (DEN)	CSC–Tiscali	s.t.
5	Daniele Nardello (ITA)	Mapei–Quick-Step	s.t.
6	Chris Peers (BEL)	Cofidis	s.t.
7	Maximilian Sciandri (GBR)	Lampre–Daikin	s.t.
8	Ludo Dierckxsens (BEL)	Lampre–Daikin	s.t.
9	Andrei Tchmil (BEL)	Lotto–Adecco	+ 19"
10	Romans Vainsteins (LAT)	Domo–Farm Frites–Latexco	s.t.
