= 1998 Dwars door België =

Race details
- Dates: 25 March 1998
- Stages: 1
- Distance: 203 km (126.1 mi)
- Winning time: 5h 14' 10"

Results
	Winner	Tom Steels (BEL)
	Second	Johan Capiot (BEL)
	Third	Andrei Tchmil (RUS)

The 1998 Dwars door België was the 53rd edition of the Dwars door Vlaanderen cycle race and was held on 25 March 1998. The race started and finished in Waregem. The race was won by Tom Steels.

== General classification ==
Final general classification

Rank	Rider	Time
1	Tom Steels (BEL)	5h 14' 10"
2	Johan Capiot (BEL)	+ 0"
3	Andrei Tchmil (BEL)	+ 0"
4	Dario Pieri (ITA)	+ 0"
5	Léon van Bon (NED)	+ 0"
6	Tom Desmet (BEL)	+ 0"
7	Peter Van Petegem (BEL)	+ 0"
8	Lars Michaelsen (DEN)	+ 0"
9	Stefano Dante (ITA)	+ 0"
10	Christophe Capelle (FRA)	+ 0"
