= 1998 Tour du Haut Var =

Race details
- Dates: 21 February 1998
- Stages: 1
- Distance: 180 km (111.8 mi)
- Winning time: 5h 02' 21"

Results
	Winner	Laurent Jalabert (FRA)
	Second	Pascal Chanteur (FRA)
	Third	Emmanuel Magnien (FRA)

The 1998 Tour du Haut Var was the 30th edition of the Tour du Haut Var cycle race and was held on 21 February 1998. The race started and finished in Draguignan. The race was won by Laurent Jalabert.

== General classification ==
Final general classification

Rank	Rider	Time
1	Laurent Jalabert (FRA)	5h 02' 21"
2	Pascal Chanteur (FRA)	+ 0"
3	Emmanuel Magnien (FRA)	+ 15"
4	Rodolfo Massi (ITA)	+ 15"
5	Michael Boogerd (NED)	+ 15"
6	Richard Virenque (FRA)	+ 15"
7	Stefano Della Santa (ITA)	+ 15"
8	Francesco Casagrande (ITA)	+ 15"
9	David Etxebarria (ESP)	+ 2' 05"
10	Andrey Kivilev (KAZ)	+ 2' 05"
