= 2000 Dwars door Vlaanderen =

Race details
- Dates: 22 March 2000
- Stages: 1
- Distance: 206 km (128 mi)
- Winning time: 4h 31' 42"

Results
	Winner	Tristan Hoffman (NED)
	Second	Peter Van Petegem (BEL)
	Third	Lars Michaelsen (DEN)

The 2000 Dwars door Vlaanderen was the 55th edition of the Dwars door Vlaanderen cycle race and was held on 22 March 2000. The race started and finished in Waregem. The race was won by Tristan Hoffman.

== General classification ==
Final general classification

Rank	Rider	Time
1	Tristan Hoffman (NED)	4h 31' 42"
2	Peter Van Petegem (BEL)	+ 0"
3	Lars Michaelsen (DEN)	+ 0"
4	Léon van Bon (NED)	+ 0"
5	Flavio Zandarin (ITA)	+ 0"
6	Martin Hvastija (SLO)	+ 0"
7	Jan Boven (NED)	+ 0"
8	Frédéric Guesdon (FRA)	+ 0"
9	Jo Planckaert (BEL)	+ 0"
10	Markus Zberg (SUI)	+ 0"
