= 1997 Omloop Het Volk =

Race details
- Dates: 1 March 1997
- Stages: 1
- Distance: 200 km (120 mi)
- Winning time: 5h 08' 00"

Results
	Winner	Peter Van Petegem (BEL)
	Second	Tom Steels (BEL)
	Third	Johan Capiot (BEL)

The 1997 Omloop Het Volk was the 51st edition of the Omloop Het Volk cycle race and was held on 1 March 1997. The race started in Ghent and finished in Lokeren. The race was won by Peter Van Petegem.

== General classification ==
Final general classification
Rank	Rider	Time
1	Peter Van Petegem (BEL)	5h 08' 00"
2	Tom Steels (BEL)	+ 8"
3	Johan Capiot (BEL)	+ 8"
4	Hendrik Redant (BEL)	+ 8"
5	Andrei Tchmil (UKR)	+ 8"
6	Franco Ballerini (ITA)	+ 8"
7	Jaan Kirsipuu (EST)	+ 27"
8	Tristan Hoffman (NED)	+ 27"
9	Christophe Mengin (FRA)	+ 27"
10	Jo Planckaert (BEL)	+ 27"
