= 1994 GP Ouest-France =

Race details
- Dates: 23 August 1994
- Stages: 1
- Distance: 209 km (129.9 mi)
- Winning time: 4h 55' 02"

Results
	Winner	Andrei Tchmil (MDA)	(Lotto)
	Second	Richard Virenque (FRA)	(Festina–Lotus)
	Third	Jens Heppner (GER)	(Team Telekom)

The 1994 GP Ouest-France was the 58th edition of the GP Ouest-France cycle race and was held on 23 August 1994. The race started and finished in Plouay. The race was won by Andrei Tchmil of the Lotto team.

== General classification ==
Final general classification

Rank	Rider	Team	Time
1	Andrei Tchmil (MDA)	Lotto	4h 55' 02"
2	Richard Virenque (FRA)	Festina–Lotus	+ 55"
3	Jens Heppner (GER)	Team Telekom	+ 55"
4	Bruno Cornillet (FRA)	Novemail–Histor–Laser Computer	+ 55"
5	Pascal Hervé (FRA)	Festina–Lotus	+ 1' 05"
6	Ronan Pensec (FRA)	Novemail–Histor–Laser Computer	+ 1' 28"
7	Laurent Brochard (FRA)	Castorama	+ 1' 28"
8	Cédric Vasseur (FRA)	Novemail–Histor–Laser Computer	+ 1' 28"
9	Francisque Teyssier (FRA)	Festina–Lotus	+ 4' 04"
10	Didier Rous (FRA)	GAN	+ 4' 14"
