= Peter Van Petegem =

Belgian cyclist (born 1970)

Peter van Petegem
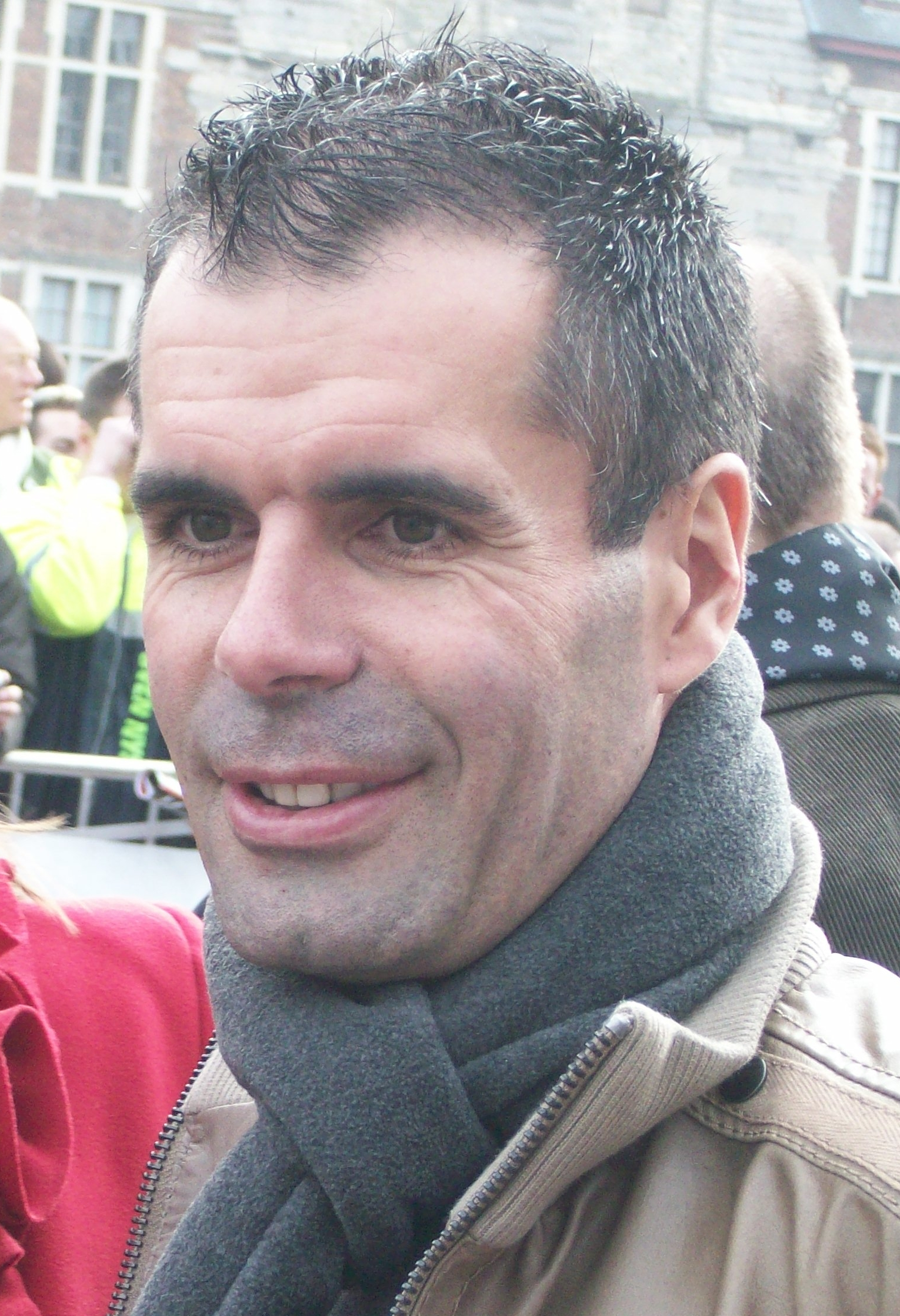
- Van Petegem at the 2009 Omloop Het Nieuwsblad

Personal information
- Full name: Peter van Petegem
- Nicknames: De Peet; de zwarte van Brakel
- Born: 18 January 1970 (age 56) Brakel, Belgium
- Height: 1.76 m (5 ft 9 in)
- Weight: 70 kg (154 lb; 11 st 0 lb)

Cycling career
- Sport: Cycling
- Current team: Retired
- Discipline: Road
- Role: Rider
- Rider type: Classics specialist

Professional teams
- 1992: PDM–Ultima–Concorde
- 1993: Lotto
- 1994: Trident–Schick
- 1995–2000: TVM–Polis Direct
- 2001: Mercury–Viatel
- 2001: Collstrop–Palmans
- 2002–2006: Lotto–Adecco
- 2007: Quick-Step–Innergetic

Major wins
- Stage races Three Days of De Panne (1999, 2002) One-day Races and Classics Tour of Flanders (1999, 2003) Paris–Roubaix (2003) E3 Prijs Vlaanderen (1999) Omloop Het Volk (1997, 1998, 2002) Scheldeprijs (1994)
Medal record
Representing Belgium
Men's road bicycle racing
UCI Road World Championships
| Silver medal – second place | 1998 Valkenburg | Elite Men's Road Race |
| Bronze medal – third place | 2003 Hamilton | Elite Men's Road Race |

Peter van Petegem (born 18 January 1970) is a former professional road racing cyclist. Van Petegem last rode for Quick Step-Innergetic, in 2007. He lived in Horebeke. He was a specialist in spring classics, one of ten riders to win the Tour of Flanders and Paris–Roubaix in the same season. He also earned a medal at the World Championship on two occasions; taking the silver in 1998 and winning the bronze in 2003. His last race was the GP Briek Schotte in Desselgem on 11 September 2007.

== Personal life ==
His sons, Axandre Van Petegem and Maurits Van Petegem, are also competitive cyclists.

== Major results ==
1988
2nd Road race, National Junior Road Championships
1990
2nd Circuit du Hainaut
1991
1st Internationale Wielertrofee Jong Maar Moedig
8th Circuit du Hainaut
8th Gran Premio della Liberazione
1992
3rd Overall Paris–Bourges
1993
6th Overall Tour d'Armorique
6th Trofeo Luis Puig
10th Cholet-Pays de la Loire
1994
1st Scheldeprijs
2nd Omloop Mandel-Leie-Schelde
4th Overall Étoile de Bessèges
4th Druivenkoers Overijse
5th Grand Prix d'Ouverture La Marseillaise
6th Road race, National Road Championships
6th Rund um den Henninger Turm
7th Cholet-Pays de la Loire
1995
1st De Kustpijl
2nd Veenendaal–Veenendaal
5th Road race, National Road Championships
6th Tour du Haut Var
7th Scheldeprijs
7th Brussels–Ingooigem
8th Nice–Alassio
1996
1st Trofeo Luis Puig
1st Stage 2 Danmark Rundt
2nd E3 Prijs Vlaanderen
2nd Herinneringsprijs Dokter Tistaert – Prijs Groot-Zottegem
4th Kuurne–Brussels–Kuurne
10th Tour of Flanders
10th Clásica de Almería
1997
1st Omloop Het Volk
1st Kampioenschap van Vlaanderen
1st Trofeo Alcúdia
2nd Paris–Bourges
5th Trofeo Manacor
5th Trofeo Calvià
6th Dwars door België
7th Herinneringsprijs Dokter Tistaert – Prijs Groot-Zottegem
8th E3 Prijs Vlaanderen
8th Veenendaal–Veenendaal
9th Overall Ronde van Nederland
9th Tour of Flanders
1998
1st Omloop Het Volk
1st Grote Prijs Beeckman-De Caluwé
2nd Road race, UCI Road World Championships
2nd Veenendaal–Veenendaal
3rd Road race, National Road Championships
3rd Overall Ronde van Nederland
3rd GP Rik Van Steenbergen
3rd Trofeo Calvià
5th Tour of Flanders
5th Trofeo Alcúdia
7th Milan–San Remo
7th Dwars door België
8th Gent–Wevelgem
8th Grand Prix Eddy Merckx
1999
1st Overall Three Days of De Panne
1st Tour of Flanders
1st E3 Prijs Vlaanderen
1st Gouden Pijl Emmen
5th Coppa Sabatini
6th Overall Ronde van Nederland
6th Dwars door België
6th Kuurne–Brussels–Kuurne
7th Milan–San Remo
8th Omloop Het Volk
8th Grand Prix Eddy Merckx
9th Grand Prix d'Isbergues
10th Gran Premio Bruno Beghelli
10th GP Zottegem – Tistaertprijs
2000
1st Grand Prix d'Isbergues
2nd Paris–Roubaix
2nd Gent–Wevelgem
2nd Dwars door Vlaanderen
4th Overall Danmark Rundt
6th E3 Prijs Vlaanderen
7th Amstel Gold Race
8th Tour of Flanders
8th Trofeo Luis Puig
9th Road race, National Road Championships
10th Overall Ronde van Nederland
10th Grand Prix Eddy Merckx
2001
1st Kuurne–Brussels–Kuurne
1st Grand Prix d'Isbergues
3rd Overall Paris–Nice

1st Stage 2

6th Amstel Gold Race
7th Delta Profronde
2002
1st Overall Three Days of De Panne

1st Stage 3b (ITT)

1st Omloop Het Volk
3rd Tour of Flanders
4th Time trial, National Road Championships
4th Dwars door Vlaanderen
5th E3 Prijs Vlaanderen
6th Amstel Gold Race
6th Paris–Brussels
6th Schaal Sels
7th Liège–Bastogne–Liège
7th GP Ouest-France
8th Overall Tour de la Région Wallonne

1st Stage 5

9th Overall Tour de Luxembourg
9th Druivenkoers Overijse
2003
1st Paris–Roubaix
1st Tour of Flanders
3rd Road race, UCI Road World Championships
3rd Overall Three Days of De Panne
3rd Grand Prix Eddy Merckx
4th Time trial, National Road Championships
7th Grand Prix de Wallonie
10th Paris–Tours
2004
5th Time trial, National Road Championships
5th Amstel Gold Race
6th Paris–Roubaix
7th Trofeo Luis Puig
10th Milan–San Remo
2005
3rd Tour of Flanders
3rd E3 Prijs Vlaanderen
4th Time trial, National Road Championships
2006
2nd Kuurne–Brussels–Kuurne
4th Tour of Flanders
9th E3 Prijs Vlaanderen
2007
8th Overall Tour de Wallonie

=== Classics results timeline ===
Monuments results timeline
| Monument | 1992 | 1993 | 1994 | 1995 | 1996 | 1997 | 1998 | 1999 | 2000 | 2001 | 2002 | 2003 | 2004 | 2005 | 2006 | 2007 |
|---|---|---|---|---|---|---|---|---|---|---|---|---|---|---|---|---|
| Milan–San Remo | — | — | — | 118 | 31 | 14 | 7 | 7 | 30 | 13 | 15 | — | 10 | — | — | — |
| Tour of Flanders | — | 97 | 17 | — | 10 | 9 | 5 | 1 | 8 | DNF | 3 | 1 | 16 | 3 | 4 | 59 |
| Paris–Roubaix | — | 49 | — | 53 | 35 | 28 | 17 | 25 | 2 | 24 | DNF | 1 | 6 | DNF | DSQ | 23 |
| Liège–Bastogne–Liège | — | — | — | — | — | — | 29 | DNF | 91 | 13 | 7 | DNF | 25 | — | — | — |
| Giro di Lombardia | — | — | — | — | — | — | — | DNF | — | — | — | — | — | — | — | — |

=== Major championship results timeline ===
| | 1992 | 1993 | 1994 | 1995 | 1996 | 1997 | 1998 | 1999 | 2000 | 2001 | 2002 | 2003 | 2004 | 2005 | 2006 | 2007 |
|---|---|---|---|---|---|---|---|---|---|---|---|---|---|---|---|---|
| World Championships | — | — | — | — | DNF | 37 | 2 | DNF | 50 | DNF | 18 | 3 | 28 | 33 | — | — |
| National Championships | 11 | — | 6 | 5 | — | — | 3 | — | 9 | 50 | 12 | 60 | — | — | 63 | 22 |

Legend
| — | Did not compete |
| DNF | Did not finish |
| DSQ | Disqualified |
