= Emmanuel Magnien =

French cyclist

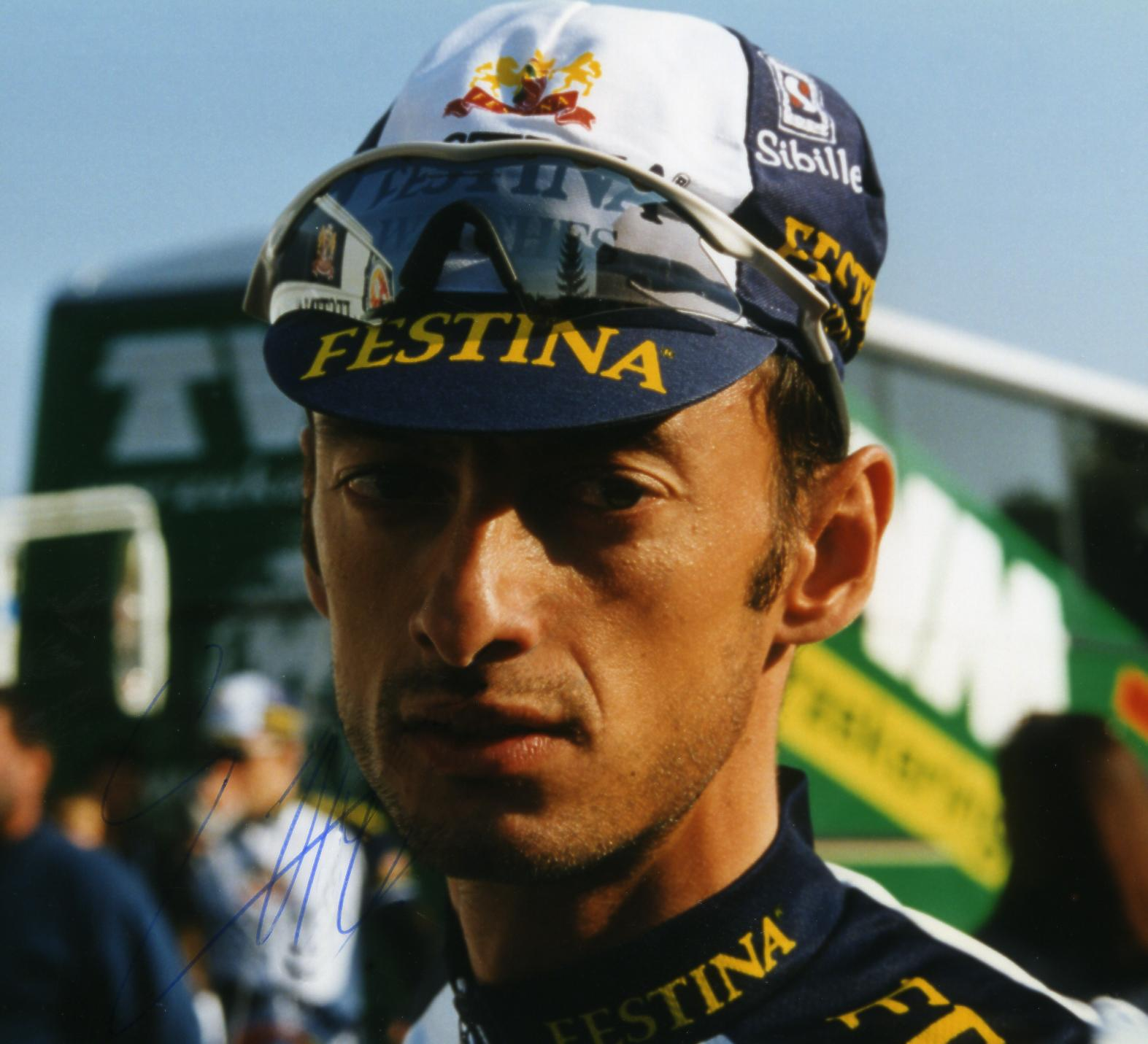
- Emmanuel Magnien at the 1997 Paris–Tours

Personal information
- Born: 7 May 1971 (age 55) Sedan, Ardennes, France

Cycling career
- Sport: Cycling
- Current team: Retired
- Disciplines: Road; Cyclo-cross
- Role: Rider

Amateur teams
- 1992: VC Nouzonville
- 1992: Castorama (stagiaire)

Professional teams
- 1993–1995: Castorama
- 1996–1997: Festina–Lotus
- 1998–2001: Française des Jeux
- 2002–2003: Bonjour

Major wins
- Tour de l'Avenir (1995) Tour Méditerranéen (1997) Grand Prix d'Ouverture La Marseillaise (2000) Paris–Brussels (2001)

Emmanuel Magnien (born 7 May 1971) is a French former cyclist, who was professional from 1993 to 2003. Before he turned professional, he took part in the 1992 Olympics in Barcelona.

Some of his notable victories are the Tour de l'Avenir (1995), Tour Méditerranéen (1997), Grand Prix d'Ouverture La Marseillaise (2000), and Paris–Brussels (2001).

== Major results ==
=== Road ===
1993
1st Overall Tour de l'Ain

1st Stage 1

1st Prologue Tour de l'Avenir
1st Stage 3 Tour du Vaucluse
5th Overall Four Days of Dunkirk
7th Overall Tour de l'Oise
9th Giro dell'Emilia
9th Trophée des Grimpeurs
1994
1st Stages 2 & 4 Critérium du Dauphiné Libéré
1st Overall Tour d'Armorique
1st Stages 1 & 2
1st Stage 11 (ITT) Tour de l'Avenir
3rd Overall Tour de l'Oise

1st Stages 1 & 3

3rd Rund um den Henninger Turm
5th Overall Four Days of Dunkirk

1st Stage 6

1995
1st Overall Tour de l'Avenir

1st Prologue & Stages 2, 9 & 11

1st Duo Normand (with Stéphane Pétilleau)
1st Stages 5 & 6 Tour du Poitou-Charentes
1st Stage 3 Mi-Août Bretonne
2nd Overall Tour de Luxembourg
2nd Trophée des Grimpeurs
5th Coppa Placci
7th Coppa Sabatini
1996
1st Stage 4 Vuelta a Aragón
3rd GP de Denain
4th Grand Prix d'Isbergues
7th Amstel Gold Race
1997
1st Overall Tour Méditerranéen
1st Stage 4 Étoile de Bessèges
6th Overall Giro di Puglia
6th Tour du Haut Var
7th Coppa Sabatini
9th Classic Haribo
10th Overall Three Days of De Panne
10th Kuurne–Brussels–Kuurne
1998
1st Coppa Sabatini
1st Polymultipliée de l'Hautil
2nd Milan–San Remo
2nd Overall Three Days of De Panne
3rd Kuurne–Brussels–Kuurne
3rd Tour du Haut Var
4th Tour of Flanders
4th Milano–Torino
4th Paris–Brussels
5th Overall Critérium International

1st Stage 1

10th Giro di Romagna
10th Paris–Bourges
1999
5th Veenendaal–Veenendaal
6th Overall Three Days of De Panne
6th GP de la Ville de Villers
10th Trophée des Grimpeurs
2000
1st Grand Prix d'Ouverture La Marseillaise
8th Tour du Haut Var
9th Grand Prix d'Isbergues
10th Overall Tour Down Under
2001
1st Paris–Brussels
5th Tour de Vendée
10th GP de Villers-Cotterêts
2002
8th Grand Prix de la Ville de Lillers
2003
1st Stage 2 Tour Méditerranéen
2nd GP de Villers-Cotterêts
10th Dwars door Vlaanderen

==== Grand Tour general classification results timeline ====
Grand Tour	1993	1994	1995	1996	1997	1998	1999	2000	2001	2002
Giro d'Italia	119	—	DNF	—	—	—	—	—	—	—
Tour de France	—	DNF	DNF	DNF	—	DNF	—	98	113	96
Vuelta a España	—	—	—	—	—	—	—	—	—	—

Legend
—	Did not compete
DNF	Did not finish

=== Cyclo-cross ===
1987–1988
1st National Junior Championships
1988–1989
1st National Junior Championships
2nd UCI Junior World Championships
1990–1991
1st National Under-23 Championships
1st Cyclo-cross de Lanarvily
1991–1992
3rd National Championships
4th UCI Amateur World Championships
1992–1993
2nd National Championships
1993–1994
1st Grand Prix Adrie van der Poel
1st Cyclo-cross de Dijon
1994–1995
1st Overall Challenge la France
3rd National Championships
10th UCI World Championships
1995–1996
1st National Championships
6th UCI World Championships
1997–1998
1st Lutterbach
3rd National Championships
6th UCI World Championships
1998–1999
2nd National Championships
2001–2002
1st Aixe-sur-Vienne
1st Camors
1st Tours-Île Aucard (with Cyril Lemoine)
1st Contres (with Cyril Lemoine)
2003–2004
1st Sablé-sur-Sarthe
