= 1999 E3 Prijs Vlaanderen =

1999 E3 Harelbeke
Race details
- Dates: 27 March 1999
- Stages: 1
- Distance: 206 km (128 mi)
- Winning time: 4h 39' 10"

Results
	Winner	Peter Van Petegem (BEL)	(TVM–Farm Frites)
	Second	Andrei Tchmil (BEL)	(Lotto–Mobistar)
	Third	Frank Vandenbroucke (BEL)	(Cofidis)

The 1999 E3 Harelbeke was the 42nd edition of the E3 Harelbeke cycle race and was held on 27 March 1999. The race started and finished in Harelbeke. The race was won by Peter Van Petegem of the TVM team.

== General classification ==
Final general classification

Rank	Rider	Team	Time
1	Peter Van Petegem (BEL)	TVM–Farm Frites	4h 39' 10"
2	Andrei Tchmil (BEL)	Lotto–Mobistar	+ 0"
3	Frank Vandenbroucke (BEL)	Cofidis	+ 0"
4	Michele Bartoli (ITA)	Mapei–Quick-Step	+ 0"
5	Tom Steels (BEL)	Mapei–Quick-Step	+ 18"
6	Lars Michaelsen (DEN)	Française des Jeux	+ 18"
7	Michel Vanhaecke (BEL)	Tönissteiner–Colnago	+ 18"
8	Gabriele Balducci (ITA)	Navigare–Gaerne	+ 18"
9	Bert Dietz (GER)	Team Nürnberger	+ 18"
10	Juris Silovs (LAT)	home–Jack & Jones	+ 18"
