= 2001 E3 Prijs Vlaanderen =

2001 E3 Harelbeke
Race details
- Dates: 31 March 2001
- Stages: 1
- Distance: 209 km (130 mi)
- Winning time: 5h 08' 49"

Results
	Winner	Andrei Tchmil (BEL)	(Lotto–Adecco)
	Second	Steffen Wesemann (SUI)	(Team Telekom)
	Third	Martin Hvastija (SLO)	(Alessio)

The 2001 E3 Harelbeke was the 44th edition of the E3 Harelbeke cycle race and was held on 31 March 2001. The race started and finished in Harelbeke. The race was won by Andrei Tchmil of the Lotto team.

== General classification ==
Final general classification

Rank	Rider	Team	Time
1	Andrei Tchmil (BEL)	Lotto–Adecco	5h 08' 49"
2	Steffen Wesemann (SUI)	Team Telekom	+ 1' 08"
3	Martin Hvastija (SLO)	Alessio	+ 1' 10"
4	Jo Planckaert (BEL)	Cofidis	+ 1' 16"
5	Tristan Hoffman (NED)	CSC–Tiscali	+ 1' 16"
6	Gabriele Balducci (ITA)	Tacconi Sport–Vini Caldirola	+ 1' 16"
7	Andrej Hauptman (SLO)	Tacconi Sport–Vini Caldirola	+ 1' 16"
8	Chris Peers (BEL)	Cofidis	+ 1' 16"
9	Davide Casarotto (ITA)	Alessio	+ 1' 16"
10	Markus Zberg (SUI)	Rabobank	+ 1' 16"
