= 2001 Züri-Metzgete =

2001 UCI Road World Cup

Race details
- Dates: 26 August 2001
- Stages: 1
- Distance: 248.4 km (154.3 mi)
- Winning time: 6h 17' 48"

Results
	Winner	Paolo Bettini (ITA)	(Mapei–Quick-Step)
	Second	Jan Ullrich (GER)	(Team Telekom)
	Third	Fernando Escartín (ESP)	(Team Coast–Buffalo)

The 2001 Züri-Metzgete was the 86th edition of the Züri-Metzgete road cycling one day race. It was held on 26 August 2001 as part of the 2001 UCI Road World Cup. The race was won by Paolo Bettini of Italy.

== Result ==
Rank	Rider	Team	Time
1	Paolo Bettini (ITA)	Mapei–Quick-Step	6h 17' 48"
2	Jan Ullrich (GER)	Team Telekom	s.t.
3	Fernando Escartín (ESP)	Team Coast–Buffalo	s.t.
4	Francesco Casagrande (ITA)	Fassa Bortolo	s.t.
5	Erik Dekker (NED)	Rabobank	+ 21"
6	Cristian Moreni (ITA)	Mercatone Uno–Stream TV	s.t.
7	Marco Serpellini (ITA)	Lampre–Daikin	+ 1' 04"
8	Niki Aebersold (SUI)	Team Coast–Buffalo	+ 1' 09"
9	Mario Aerts (BEL)	Lotto–Adecco	+ 1' 12"
10	George Hincapie (USA)	U.S. Postal Service	+ 1' 20"
