= 2002 Three Days of De Panne =

Race details
- Dates: 2 April–4 April 2002
- Stages: 3
- Distance: 541 km (336 mi)
- Winning time: 12h 24' 23"

Results
	Winner	Peter Van Petegem (BEL)
	Second	Stefano Zanini (ITA)
	Third	George Hincapie (USA)

The 2002 Three Days of De Panne was the 26th edition of the Three Days of De Panne cycle race and was held on 2 April to 4 April 2002. The race started in Mouscron and finished in De Panne. The race was won by Peter Van Petegem.

== General classification ==
Final general classification

Rank	Rider	Time
1	Peter Van Petegem (BEL)	12h 24' 23"
2	Stefano Zanini (ITA)	+ 32"
3	George Hincapie (USA)	+ 1' 03"
4	Niko Eeckhout (BEL)	s.t.
5	Robert Hunter (RSA)	+ 1' 12"
6	László Bodrogi (FRA)	+ 1' 14"
7	Tom Boonen (BEL)	+ 1' 24"
8	Marc Wauters (BEL)	+ 1' 25"
9	Ludo Dierckxsens (BEL)	+ 1' 27"
10	Daniele Nardello (ITA)	+ 1' 28"
