= 1999 Tour de la Région Wallonne =

Race details
- Dates: 30 July–4 August 1999
- Stages: 5 + Prologue
- Distance: 871 km (541.2 mi)
- Winning time: 22h 11' 46"

Results
	Winner	Mikael Holst Kyneb (DEN)
	Second	Marc Streel (BEL)
	Third	Andrei Tchmil (RUS)

The 1999 Tour de la Région Wallonne was the 26th edition of the Tour de Wallonie cycle race and was held on 30 July to 4 August 1999. The race started in Ploegsteert and finished in Amay. The race was won by Mikael Holst Kyneb.

== General classification ==
Final general classification

Rank	Rider	Time
1	Mikael Holst Kyneb (DEN)	22h 11' 46"
2	Marc Streel (BEL)	+ 28"
3	Andrei Tchmil (BEL)	+ 1' 35"
4	Tony Bracke (BEL)	+ 1' 41"
5	Frédéric Finot (FRA)	+ 1' 57"
6	Nicolas Jalabert (FRA)	+ 1' 58"
7	Lauri Aus (EST)	+ 2' 34"
8	Bradley McGee (AUS)	+ 2' 43"
9	Giuliano Figueras (ITA)	+ 3' 14"
10	Stéphane Bergès (FRA)	+ 3' 15"
