= Raspaillebos =

Forest in Belgium

Coordinates: 50°46′24″N 3°56′12″E

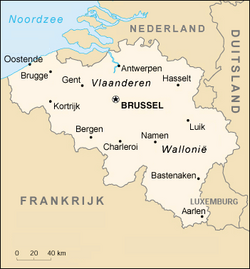

Location
- Country: Belgium

Raspaillebos (with the adjacent Moerbekebos and forest reserve Karkoolbos) is a forest area in the Flemish Ardennes in the south of the Belgian province of East Flanders. The forest area of 50 hectares is located on the territory of the municipality of Geraardsbergen (boroughs Moerbeke and Grimminge), near the provincial border with Galmaarden in Flemish Brabant. Raspaillebos connects to Moerbekebos, to the Flemish forest reserve Karkoolbos, and also to the forest area Kluysbos in Galmaarden. Raspaillebos is managed by the Flemish government agency Agency for Nature and Forest (Agentschap voor Natuur en Bos) and by Natuurpunt. The nature reserve holds European recognition as a Natura 2000 area (Bossen van de Vlaamse Ardennen en andere Zuid-Vlaamse bossen) and is part of the Flemish Ecological Network. The area has been a protected landscape since 1980 and is also recognized as a quiet area.

== Landscape ==
Raspaillebos is located on the steep eastern flank of the witness hill, Bosberg. This beech forest is situated in a highly undulating landscape on the border of the Flemish Ardennes and the Payottenland, featuring steep valley walls, rolling hills, and deeply incised valleys. The 50-hectare Raspaillebos, together with Moerbekebos, Karkoolbos, and Kluisbos, forms a 150-hectare forested area on the slopes of the Bosberg. At 107.5 meters, Bosberg mountain acts as a divide between the valley of the Dender river and that of its tributary, the Mark. A steep cobblestone climb bisects the forest and transitions to an ancient Roman road at the top, famously known as the final straight in the Tour of Flanders. Apart from some scattered ribbon development, the surroundings are sparsely populated. In a clockwise direction, more than a kilometer from the summit, you'll find the hamlets of Bruinsbroek, Sint-Paulus, Atembeke, Onkerzele, and Boskant. Surrounding the forest is a mosaic of meadows and fields, balancing between elevations of 30 and 90 meters. Springs, slopes, and ditches add even more variety to the terrain. The landscape is adorned with a finely woven network of field copses, hedgerows, old hawthorn hedges, thickets, pollarded willows, and flower-rich sunken lanes.

== History ==
Raspaillebos once belonged to a forest called 'Arduenna' by the Romans and known as Kolenwoud during the time of the Franks. This name has its origins in the Iron Age, when charcoal was burned en masse for iron production. Kolenwoud formed a wedge between the rich cultivated lands of South Flanders and Hainaut on the one hand and Hesbaye on the other. It consisted of large forest areas connected by smaller groves and thicket-rich grassland (wastine). From the 10th century on, several waves of clearing followed one another, with peaks in the 14th and 19th centuries. It is believed that Ferraris' map of the mid-18th century gives a good idea of the degree of afforestation around 1300. Although at that time, Raspaillebos was only a shadow of the great Kolenwoud, it was still three times larger than today (495 hectares) and extended as far as the walls of the monastery of Beaupré at Grimminge.

The name of the forest is said to derive from the term rapaille (scum) or from raspe (coppice). The Old Flemish raspe (planing, rasping) refers to the traditional coppice management in this forest. Every 12 to 18 years, old stumps of trees and shrubs are cut down to the ground. New shoots sprout here, which continue to grow until the next cutting. Numerous springs spring up in the forest. At one of these springs, a little chapel, 't Juffrouwke, was built because the water was said to help against toothaches.

The chapel at the foot of the Bosberg was erected around 1650, after a hermit's statue of Mary became the object of mysterious events. Pilgrims came en masse to Raspaillebos. In no time, a Dominican monastery was established there, and the chapel served as its vestibule. Today, it stands as the only remaining relic of the monastery and was restored in 1997.

Still in the forest is the smaller Miss Chapel, popularly known as 't Iffraken or 't Uffraken, dedicated to Saint Apollonia. The faithful came here to ask her intercession for toothaches.

Steenborre is the most famous spring. It was the meeting point between St. Adriaan's Abbey in Geraardsbergen, Cistercian convent of Beaupré in Grimminge, and Dominicans of Atembeke.

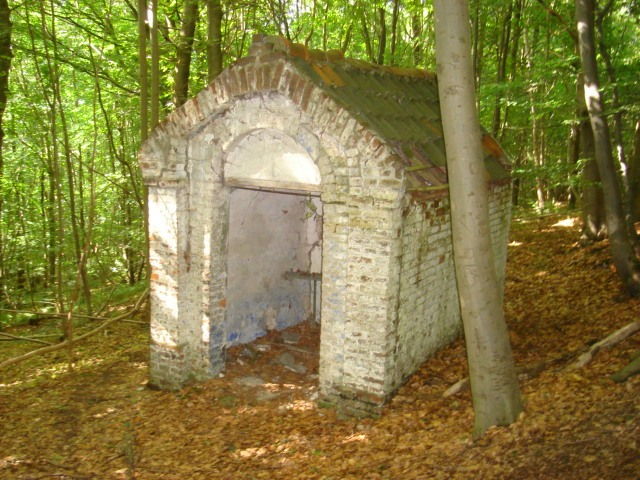
Juffvrouwkapel in Rapsaillebos

During the revolt of the people of Ghent in the 14th century, at the time of Jacob and Philip van Artevelde, the rebels found support among some farmers from Geraardsbergen and Ronse regions. The farmers were driven out of their farms and found refuge in Raspaillebos. Thus, a gang of robbers was formed who, from the forest, carried out numerous raids in the castles of Ath, Lessines, and Flobecq. Jan de Lichte and his gang are also said to have stayed here repeatedly. According to some sources, the forest owes its name to these villainous stories. The words Raspeel, Rapaille, and Raplage all refer to scum.

== Fauna ==
Raspaillebos is an important focal point for tens of thousands of birds on their annual migration south. The rich population of raptors in Raspaillebos – buzzards, kestrels, meadowlarks, hawks, and little owls – attests to a healthy food pyramid in the forest. Raspaillebos is home to tawny owls, red squirrels, weasels, ermines, polecats, foxes, and roe deer. Also notable are the fire salamander, slow worm, and garden dormouse.

== Flora ==
Raspaillebos consist of beech, oak, alder, and ash. The nature reserve is especially known for its spring blooms. In spring, the banks of the spring streams form colorful ribbons of the Cuckoo flower, Primula, Adoxa, Solomon's seal, Kingcup, and Ficaria. Where seepage water rises, rarities such as giant horsetail, drooping sedge, slender sedge, and spearroot grow. On the slopes, wild daffodils, badger garlic, wild hyacinths, and primrose provide splashes of color. The wide forest edge of shrubs and shrubby herbs forms a light-rich transition between the forest and the surrounding fields. In places where coppice management is maintained, rare plants such as the herp Paris, common spotted orchid, and the common twayblade grow.

== Nature management ==
The forest is under the management of both the Flemish government agency Agency for Nature and Forest (Agentschap voor Natuur en Bos) and Natuurpunt. In the forest core, poplars, larches, and other exotics have to make way for native species. After this metamorphosis, the forest is left as much as possible to the whims of Mother Nature. The final management is limited to maintaining the traditional coppice or middle wood management in a limited number of places. In a belt of meadows around the forest, we opt for forest expansion, which must arise spontaneously under the guidance of a limited number of large grazers. The final goal is forest (70%) with open, grassy places (30%). Where hedges and willow rows adorn the landscape, these will be preserved for ecological and cultural-historical reasons, and the small-scale structure will be further enhanced by extensive grazing. However, the goal here is not a forest but an open wasteland of roughened grassland (70%) with thickets (30%). In time, this spontaneous evolution should result in a varied landscape where the boundaries between the forest and its surroundings blur. In 2001, the Raspaillebos was included (together with Bos t'Ename and Everbeeks Wood [Everbeekse bossen]) in the LIFE program of the European Union.

== Nature Experience ==
A nature and environmental education center ("NMEC De Helix") has been built in Grimminge. Raspaillebos is freely accessible on the hiking trails that cross the nature reserve. Five signposted hiking trails (orange (2.5 km), red (3.7 km), green (2 km), yellow (4 km), "Aardgasnatuurwandeling" (7.7 km) and a mountain bike trail have been established. The signposted cycling route network "Flemish Ardennes", the signposted walking route network "Flemish Ardennes - Bronbossen", the Streek-GR Flemish Ardennes, and the signposted "Stiltepad Dender-Mark" also visit the nature reserve.

== Gallery ==
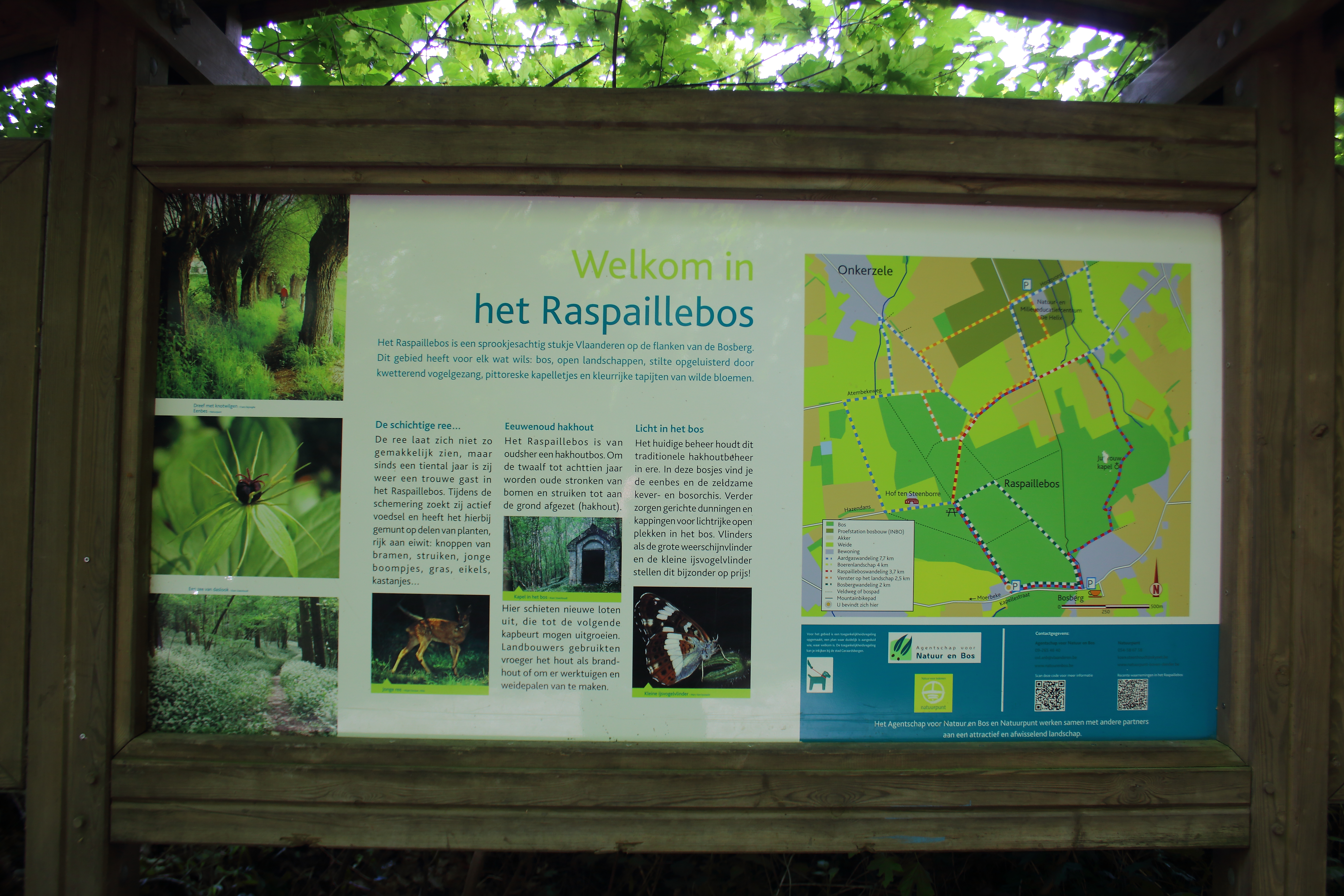

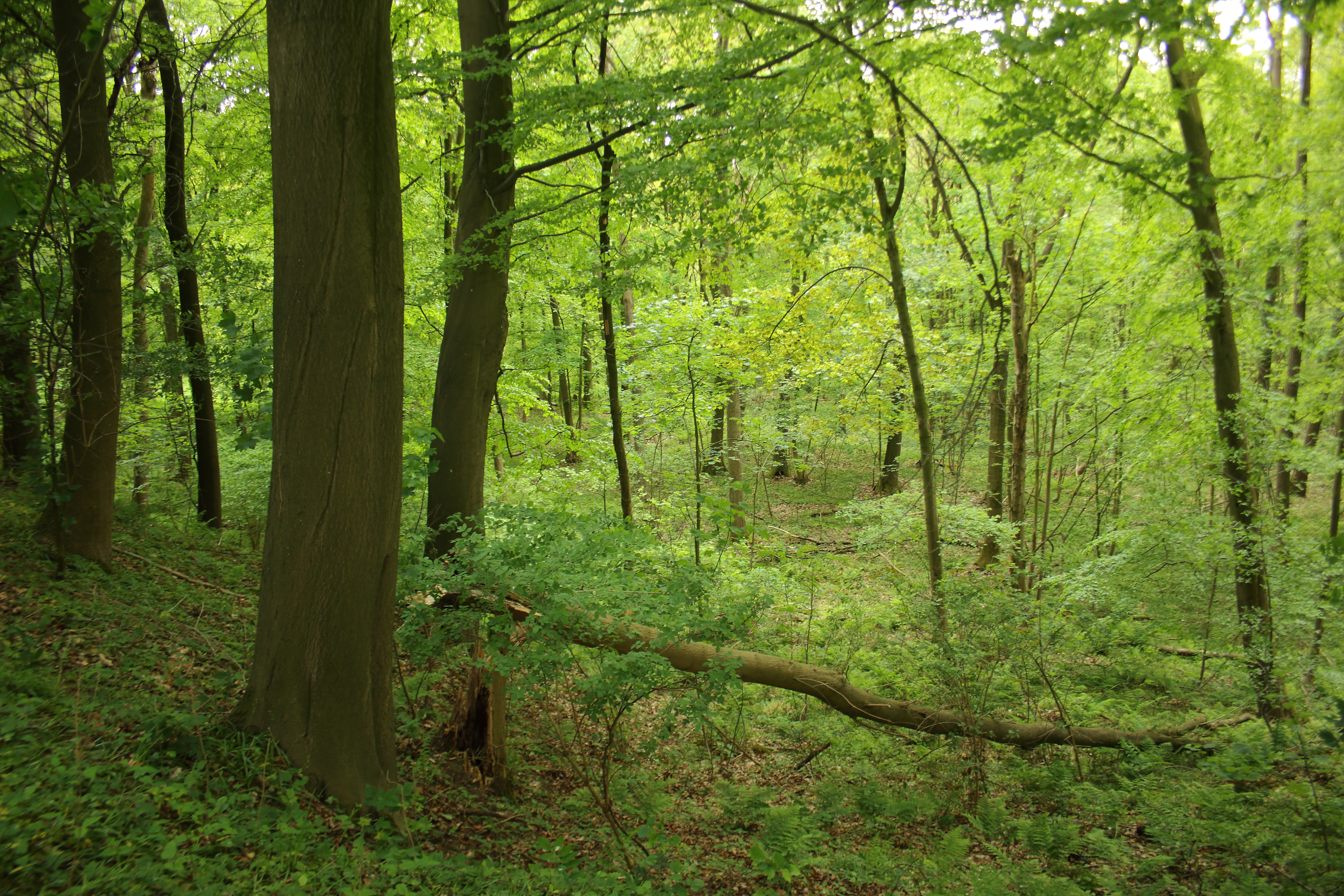

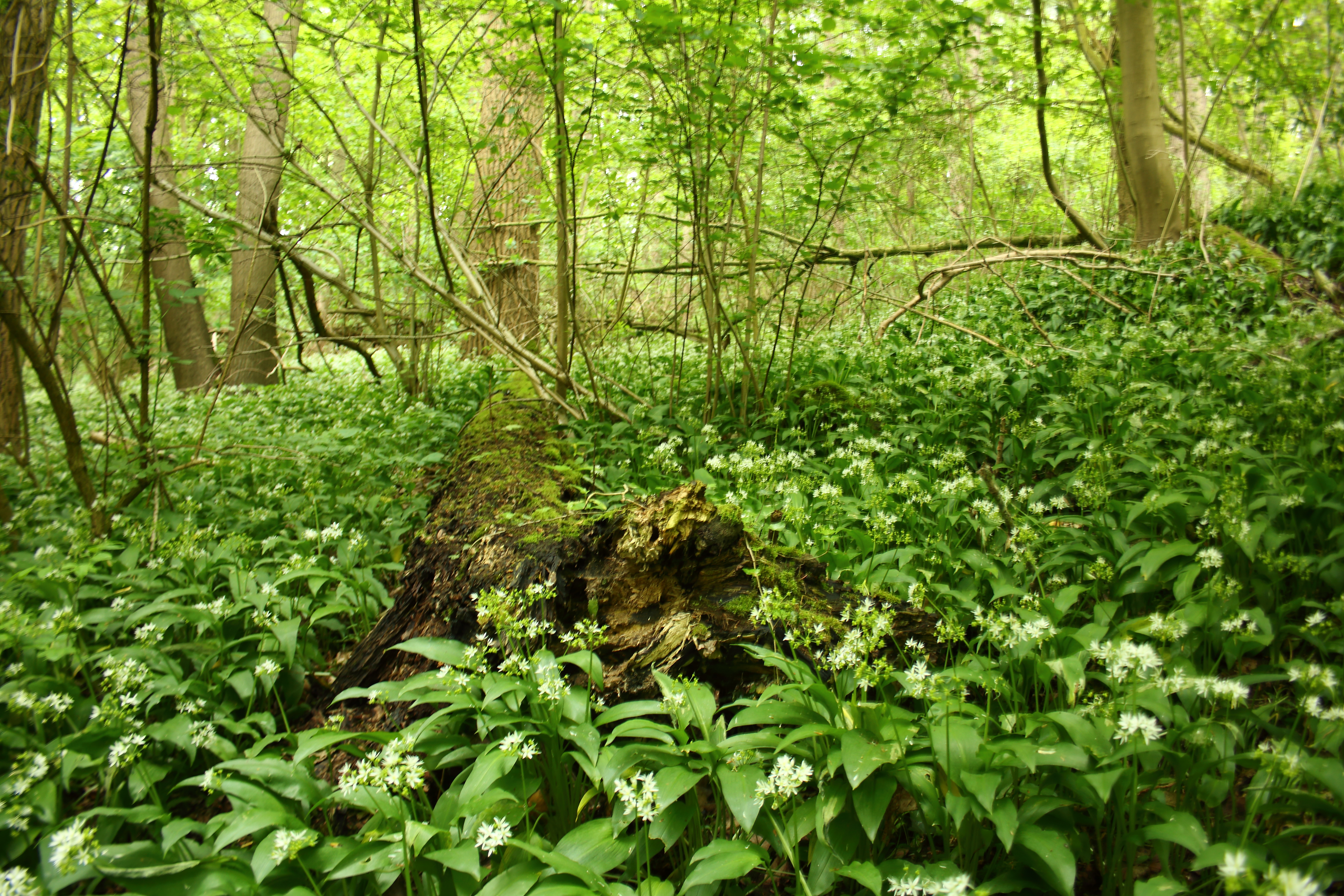

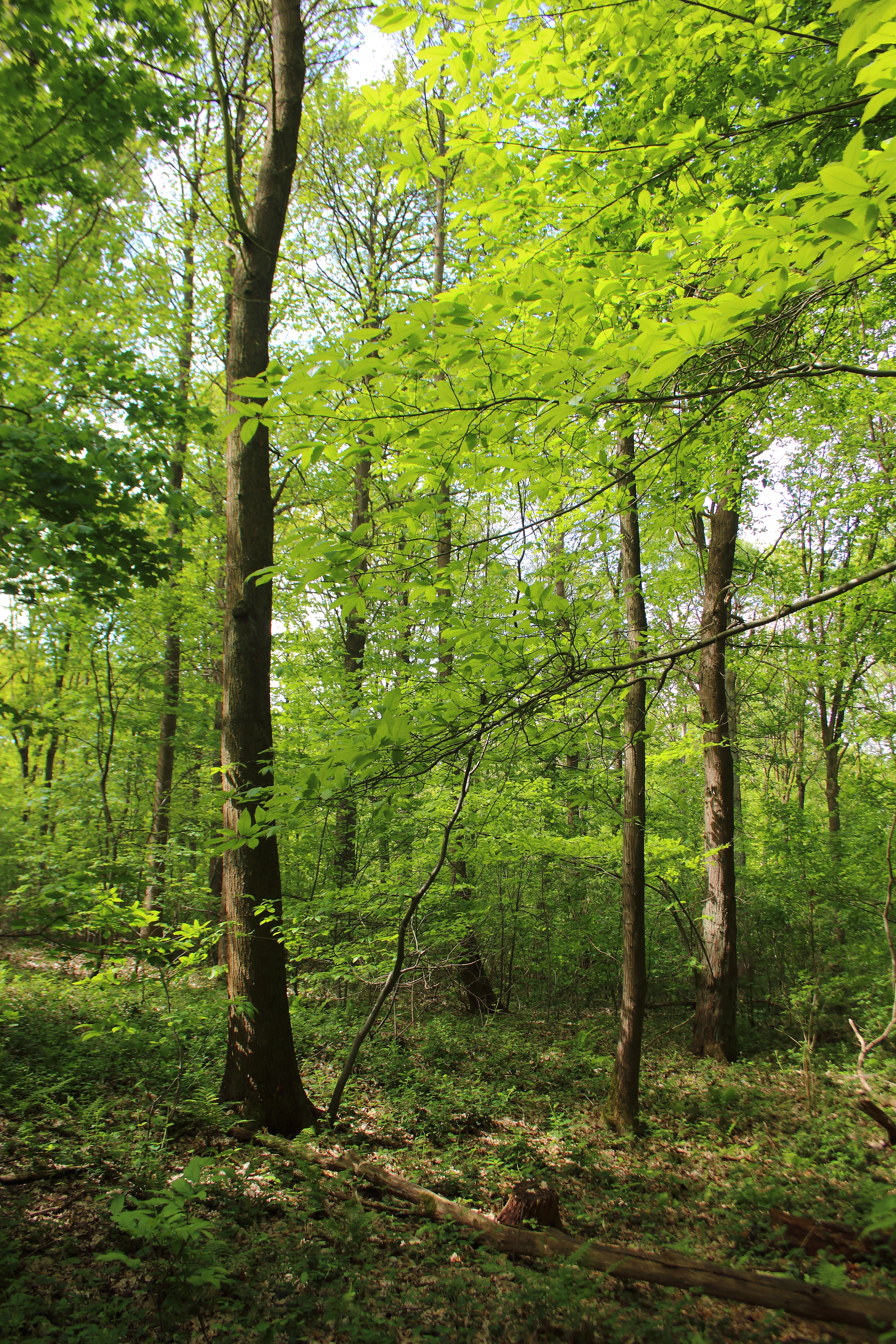

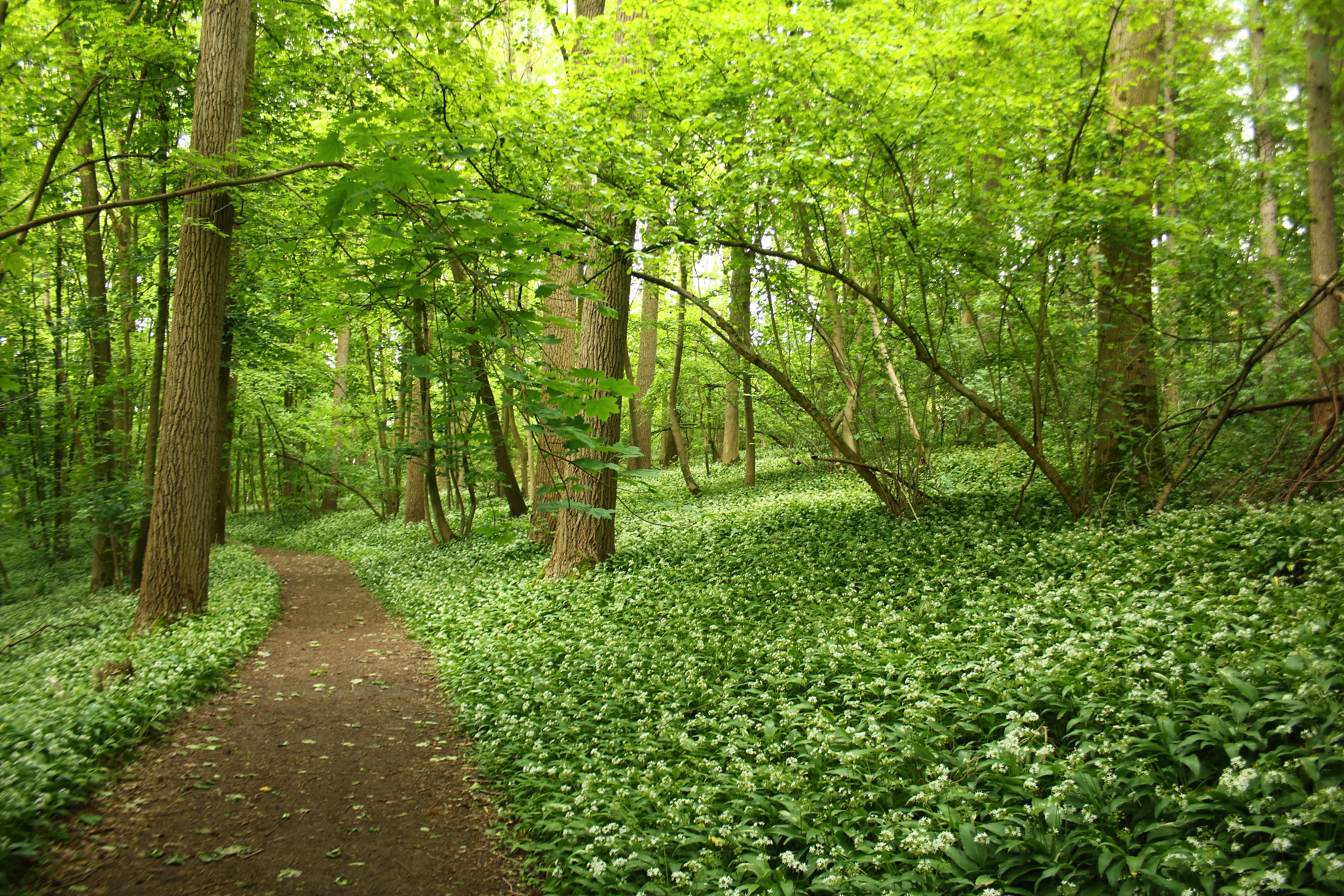

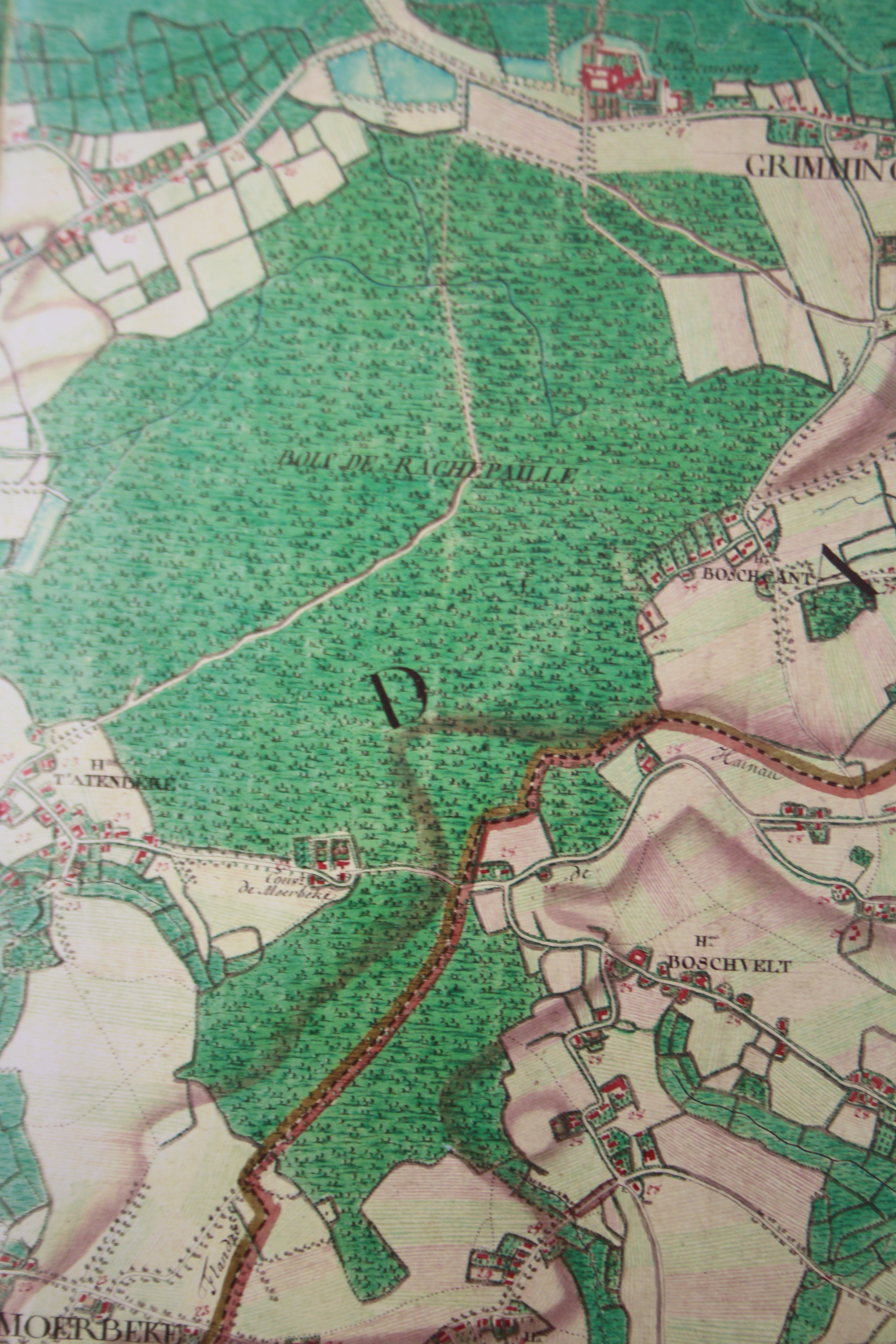

== See also ==
- Belgium
- Bosberg
- Flemish Ardennes
- Saint Apollonia
