= 1994 E3 Prijs Vlaanderen =

1994 E3 Harelbeke
Race details
- Dates: 26 March 1994
- Stages: 1
- Distance: 206 km (128 mi)
- Winning time: 5h 15' 30"

Results
| | Winner | Andrei Tchmil (MDA) | (Lotto) |
| | Second | Viatcheslav Ekimov (RUS) | (WordPerfect–Colnago–Decca) |
| | Third | Silvio Martinello (ITA) | (Mercatone Uno–Medeghini) |

The 1994 E3 Harelbeke was the 37th edition of the E3 Harelbeke cycle race and was held on 26 March 1994. The race started and finished in Harelbeke. The race was won by Andrei Tchmil of the Lotto team.

== General classification ==
Final general classification

| Rank | Rider | Team | Time |
|---|---|---|---|
| 1 | Andrei Tchmil (MDA) | Lotto | 5h 15' 30" |
| 2 | Viatcheslav Ekimov (RUS) | WordPerfect–Colnago–Decca | + 8" |
| 3 | Silvio Martinello (ITA) | Mercatone Uno–Medeghini | + 10" |
| 4 | Johan Museeuw (BEL) | GB–MG Maglificio | + 10" |
| 5 | Gianluca Bortolami (ITA) | Mapei–CLAS | + 10" |
| 6 | Jo Planckaert (BEL) | Novemail–Histor–Laser Computer | + 10" |
| 7 | Fabio Baldato (ITA) | GB–MG Maglificio | + 10" |
| 8 | Steve Bauer (CAN) | Motorola | + 10" |
| 9 | Tristan Hoffman (NED) | TVM–Bison Kit | + 10" |
| 10 | Olaf Ludwig (GER) | Team Telekom | + 10" |
