= Axandre Van Petegem =

Belgian cyclist

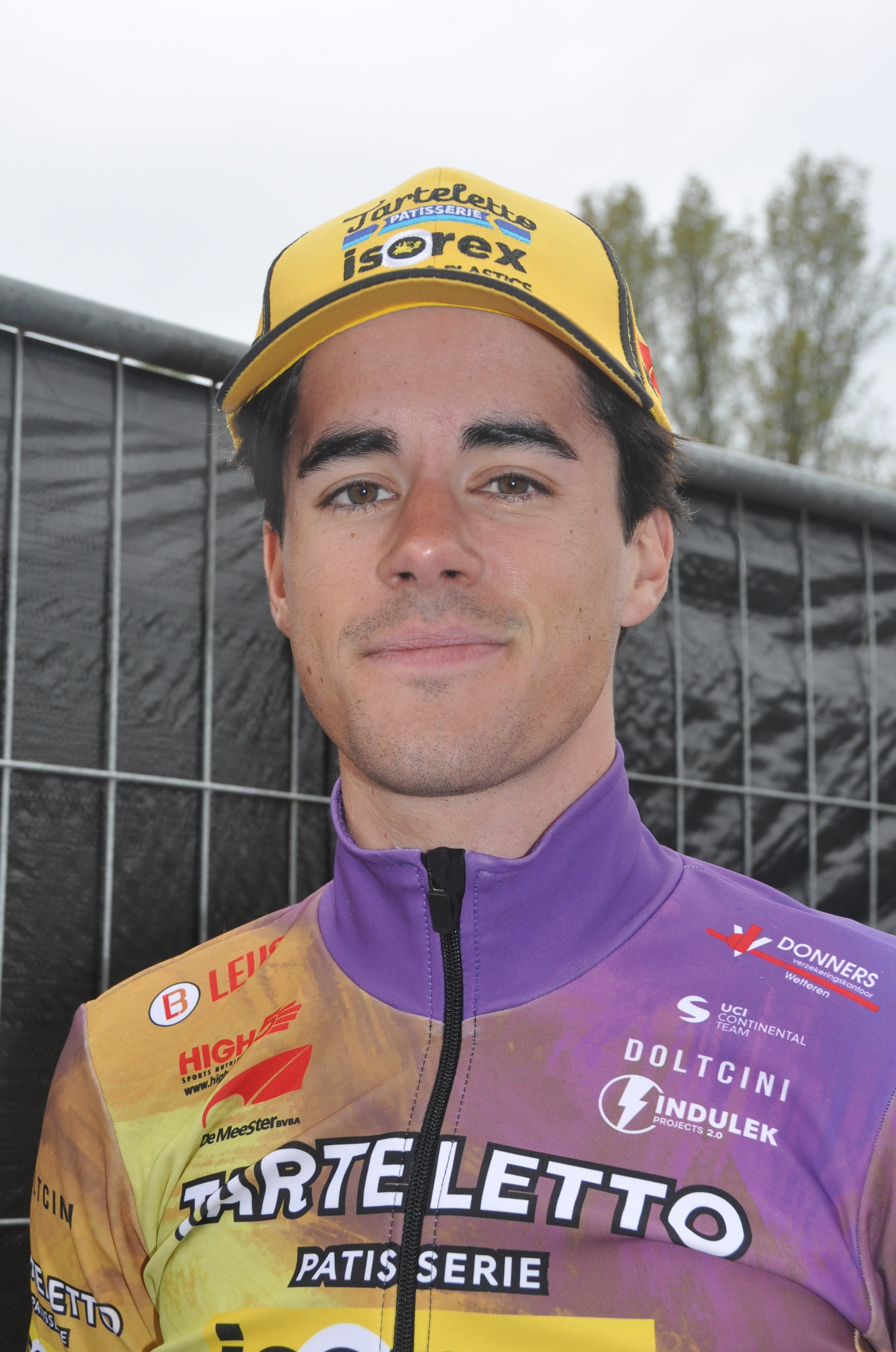
- Axandre Van Petegem

Personal information
- Born: 13 January 2002 (age 24) Oudenaarde, Belgium
- Height: 1.80 m (5 ft 11 in)
- Weight: 68 kg (150 lb)

Cycling career
- Sport: Cycling
- Current team: Wagner Bazin WB
- Discipline: Road
- Role: Rider

Amateur teams
- 2017–2020: Onder Ons Parike
- 2021: Home Solution–Soenens

Professional teams
- 2021: Jumbo–Visma Development Team (stagiaire)
- 2022–2023: Jumbo–Visma Development Team
- 2024: Lidl–Trek Future Racing
- 2024: Bingoal WB (stagiaire)
- 2025–: Wagner Bazin WB

Axandre Van Petegem (born 13 January 2002) is a Belgian cyclist who rides for UCI ProTeam Wagner Bazin WB. He is the son of Peter Van Petegem, a former professional cyclist who won the 2003 Paris–Roubaix.

== Early life ==
Van Petegem came to cycling relatively late in his youth, having concentrated on football for nine years.

== Career ==
In his second year riding for Onder Ons Parike, Van Petegem won the Criterium Europeen des Jeunes in Luxembourg in September 2018, which he was quoted as saying was the best of his five victories in 2018. It was his first victory outside of his native Belgium. He made his debut in the junior Tour of Flanders race in 2019.

In 2021, stepping up to U23 racing, he signed to race for Home Solution–Soenens. In August 2021, he signed a contract to ride for the Jumbo–Visma Development Team.

He finished ninth in the under-23 version of Omloop Het Nieuwsblad in 2022, before suffering an injury to his hip that required two surgeries. The recovery from surgery left him in a wheelchair for four months and unable to cycle for eight months.

In August 2023, he was announced to be part of the inaugural roster for the 2024 Lidl-Trek development team.

== Personal life ==
From Oudenaarde, he is the son of Peter Van Petegem. His younger brother Maurits played football as a youth for KV Kortrijk before also taking up cycle racing.

== Major results ==
2022
9th Omloop Het Nieuwsblad U23
2023
9th Grote Prijs Antoon Decock
9th Bambrugge Erpe-Mere
9th Rumbeke
