= Polymultipliée de l'Hautil =

Road bicycle race

Race details
- Date: September
- Region: France
- Discipline: Road race
- Competition: French Road Cycling Cup
- Type: One day race

History
- First edition: 1997
- Editions: 2
- Final edition: 1998
- First winner: Mauro Gianetti (SWI)
- Most wins: No repeat winners
- Final winner: Emmanuel Magnien (FRA)

The Tour des Pyrénées was a French road bicycle race. It was part of the French Road Cycling Cup.

== Winners ==
Year	Country	Rider	Team
1997	Switzerland	Mauro Gianetti	Française des Jeux
1998	France	Emmanuel Magnien	Française des Jeux
