= Niki Aebersold =

Swiss cyclist

Personal information
- Full name: Niki Aebersold
- Born: 5 July 1972 (age 54) Freimettigen, Switzerland
- Height: 1.7 m (5 ft 7 in)
- Weight: 58 kg (128 lb)

Cycling career
- Sport: Cycling
- Current team: Retired
- Discipline: Road
- Role: Rider

Professional teams
- 1996: PMU Romand–Bepsa
- 1997–1998: Post Swiss Team
- 1999–2000: Rabobank
- 2001–2003: Team Coast–Buffalo
- 2003–2005: Phonak

Major wins
- One-day races and Classics Milano–Torino (1998) National Road Race Championships (1998)

Niki Aebersold (born 5 July 1972 in Freimettigen) is a Swiss former professional road bicycle racer who rode for UCI ProTeam Phonak Hearing Systems from May 2003 to 2005. He was the Swiss National Road Race champion in 1998.

== Major results ==
1995
1st Stage 5 Regio-Tour
1st Stage 9 Rheinland-Pfalz-Rundfahrt
1997
1st Overall Ostschweizer Rundfahrt

1st Mountains classification
1st Points classification
1st Stages 1, 2, 3, 4 & 5

1st Stausee Rundfahrt
1st Stage 9 Tour de Suisse
2nd Overall GP Tell

1st Stage 1

3rd Road race, National Road Championships
6th Overall Tour de l'Avenir
1998
1st Road race, National Road Championships
1st Milano–Torino
1st Overall OBV Classic

1st Points classification

1st Schynberg Rundfahrt
1st Stages 7 & 9 Tour de Suisse
1st Stage 2 Tour of Austria
5th Road race, UCI Road World Championships
5th Japan Cup
7th Overall À travers Lausanne
1999
2nd Tour de Berne
6th Liège–Bastogne–Liège
7th Overall Tour of the Basque Country
10th Overall Setmana Catalana de Ciclisme
2000
4th Trofeo Melinda
6th Road race, UCI Road World Championships
2001
2nd Milano–Torino
2nd Six Days of Zürich
8th Züri-Metzgete
2002
3rd GP Lugano
8th GP du canton d'Argovie
2003
3rd Road race, National Road Championships
2004
Tour de Suisse

1st Mountains classification
1st Stage 6

=== Grand Tour general classification results timeline ===
Grand Tour	1998	1999	2000	2001	2002	2003	2004
Giro d'Italia	—	—	68	—	—	—	40
Tour de France	—	—	—	—	—	—	—
Vuelta a España	27	20	—	90	—	144	—

Legend
—	Did not compete
DNF	Did not finish
