= Ludovic Auger =

French cyclist (born 1971)

Personal information
- Full name: Ludovic Auger
- Born: 17 February 1971 (age 55) France
- Height: 1.84 m (6 ft 0 in)
- Weight: 78 kg (172 lb)

Cycling career
- Sport: Cycling
- Current team: Retired
- Discipline: Road
- Role: Rider

Professional teams
- 1994–2004: BigMat–Auber 93
- 2005–2007: Française des Jeux

Ludovic Auger (born 17 February 1971 in Joigny) is a French former professional road bicycle racer. In his 14-year career, he rode for BigMat–Auber 93 from 1994 until 2004 and then for UCI ProTeam Française des Jeux from 2005 to 2007.

== Major results ==
- Tour de la Manche – 1 stage & Overall (2004)
- Tour de Normandie – Overall (2000)
- GP Fina - Fayt-le-Franc (1998)
- Solidarity Tour – 1 stage (1997)
- 2nd, National U19 Road Race Championship (1989)
