= Tom Desmet =

Belgian cyclist

Personal information
- Born: 29 November 1969 (age 56) Kortrijk, Belgium

Cycling career
- Sport: Cycling
- Current team: Retired
- Discipline: Road
- Role: Rider

Professional teams
- 1991–1992: Tulip Computers
- 1993–1994: Lotto
- 1995–1999: Collstrop–Lystex
- 2000: Tönissteiner–Colnago
- 2001: Bankgiroloterij
- 2002: Marlux–Ville de Charleroi

Tom Desmet (born 29 November 1969 in Kortrijk) is a Belgian former cyclist, who competed professionally from 1991 until 2002. He is the son of professional cyclist Armand Desmet.

== Major results ==
1990
1st Internationale Wielertrofee Jong Maar Moedig
2nd Flèche Ardennaise
1991
3rd Overall Paris–Bourges
1993
3rd De Kustpijl
10th Japan Cup Cycle Road Race
1994
7th Grand Prix d'Ouverture La Marseillaise
9th Tour de Vendée
1995
8th Kampioenschap van Vlaanderen
1997
4th Omloop van het Waasland
4th Grand Prix de la Ville de Lillers
6th Nationale Sluitingprijs
7th Overall Driedaagse van De Panne-Koksijde
9th Druivenkoers Overijse
1998
3rd Le Samyn
6th Dwars door België
6th GP de la Ville de Villers
6th Nokere Koerse
1999
10th Kuurne–Brussels–Kuurne
2000
3rd GP Rudy Dhaenens
4th Omloop van de Westhoek
4th Brussels–Ingooigem
8th Omloop van de Vlaamse Scheldeboorden
10th Omloop van het Houtland
2001
1st GP Raf Jonckheere
8th Brussels–Ingooigem
2002
6th Hel van het Mergelland
7th Grote 1-MeiPrijs
