= Wim Vansevenant =

Belgian cyclist

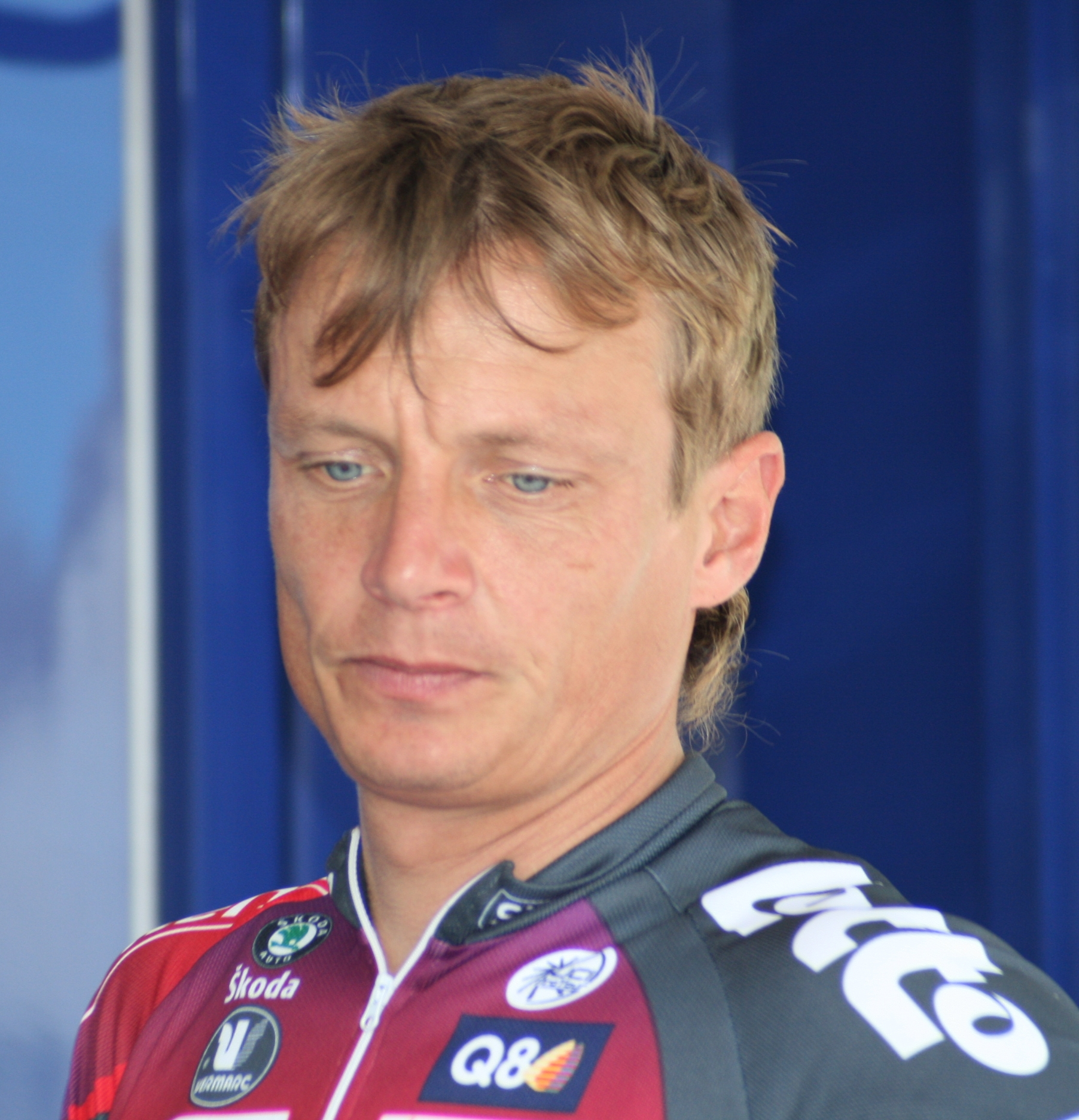
- Vansevenant at the 2008 Four Days of Dunkirk

Personal information
- Full name: Wim Vansevenant
- Nickname: Sevie
- Born: 23 December 1971 (age 54)
- Height: 1.74 m (5 ft 9 in)
- Weight: 65 kg (143 lb)

Cycling career
- Sport: Cycling
- Current team: Retired
- Discipline: Road
- Role: Rider

Professional teams
- 1994: WordPerfect–Colnago–Decca (Trainee)
- 1995–1998: Vlaanderen 2002–Eddy Merckx
- 1999: Collstrop-De Federale Verzekeringen
- 2000: Farm Frites
- 2001: Mercury-Viatel
- 2002: Palmans-Collstrop
- 2003–2008: Lotto–Domo

Wim Vansevenant (born 23 December 1971) is a Belgian former professional road bicycle racer. He is the father of fellow racing cyclist Mauri Vansevenant.

== Career ==
Vansevenant was born in Diksmuide. In his early years he was active mainly in Bovekerke, where he lived with his parents, and its surroundings. Later he moved to Torhout where he has a small farm. Vansevenant turned professional in 1995.

Vansevenant has been lanterne rouge of the Tour de France three times, in 2006, 2007 and 2008. He is the only man ever to have finished last three times. "Lanterne rouge is not a position you go for," Vansevenant told journalist Sam Abt in 2006. "It comes for you."

Vansevenant retired after the 2008 season with plans to take over his parents' farm.

In June 2011, Vansevenant was accused of importing doping products into Belgium. He has claimed that the products were for his own personal use.

== Major results ==
1993
3rd World Military Championship
3rd National Amateur Time Trial Championship
1995
9th Overall Regio-Tour
1996
1st Stage 2 Tour du Vaucluse
2nd Druivenkoers Overijse
1997
9th Dwars door Vlaanderen
1998
4th Brussel-Ingooigem
10th Overall Tour of Austria
10th Ronde van Overijssel
2000
3rd Grand Prix de Villers-Cotterêts
7th GP Stad Zottegem
2001
5th Grand Prix de Wallonie
6th GP Stad Zottegem
10th GP Rik Van Steenbergen
2002
3rd Cholet-Pays de Loire
5th Brabantese Pijl
2003
3rd GP Stad Zottegem
