= Ludo Dierckxsens =

Belgian cyclist (1964–2025)

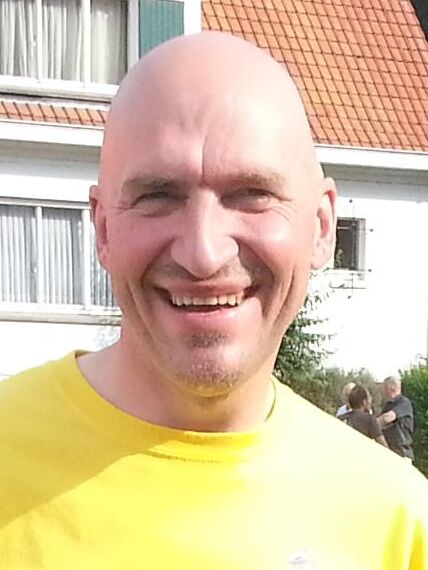
- Dierckxsens in 2012

Personal information
- Full name: Ludo Dierckxsens
- Born: 14 October 1964 Geel, Belgium
- Died: 29 May 2025 (aged 60) Sint-Gillis-bij-Dendermonde, Belgium

Cycling career
- Sport: Cycling
- Discipline: Road
- Role: Rider

Professional teams
- 1994: Saxon
- 1995: Collstrop
- 1996–1997: Tönissteiner
- 1998: Lotto–Mobistar
- 1999–2002: Lampre–Daikin
- 2003–2004: Landbouwkrediet–Colnago

Major wins
- Grand Tours Tour de France 1 individual stage (1999) One-day races and Classics National Road Race Championships (1999)

Ludo Dierckxsens (14 October 1964 – 29 May 2025) was a Belgian racing cyclist. He was best known for winning the 11th stage of the 1999 Tour de France, while competing for Lampre–Daikin. Dierckxsens died during the 1000 km bike ride of Kom op tegen Kanker on 29 May 2025 in Sint-Gillis-bij-Dendermonde. He was 60.

== 1999 Tour de France ==
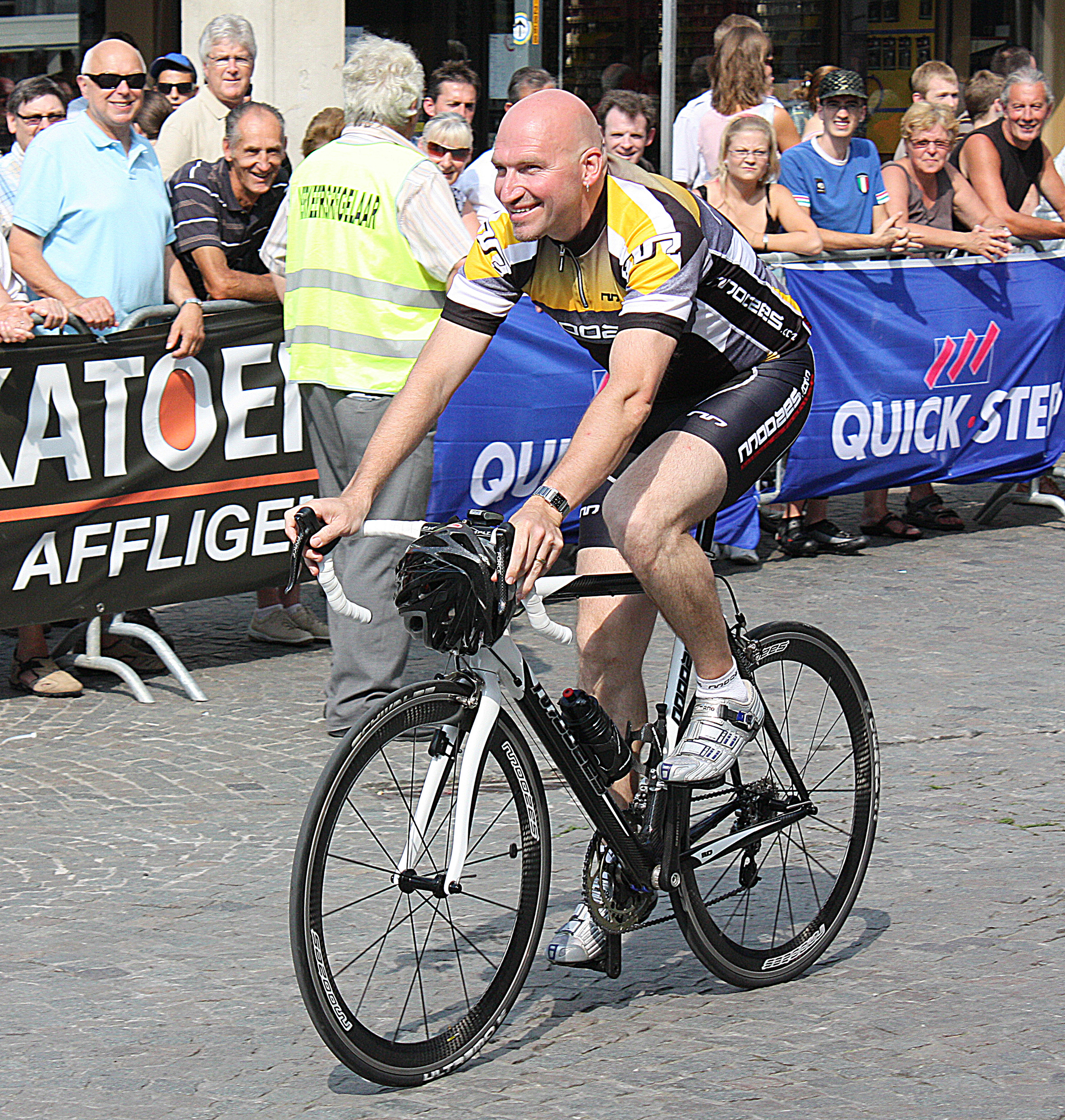
Dierckxsens in 2008

Ludo Dierckxsens won the 11th stage of the 1999 Tour de France. After this stage victory, Dierckxsens went to take the obligatory doping tests. When the doctors asked him the routine question if he had taken any products which might cause a positive test result, Dierckxsens replied that he had taken tetracosactide (Synacthen) in the Tour of Germany, to reduce knee pain. He claimed to have a prescription for them, but his team Lampre–Daikin did not know about this, and sent him home a few days later. The doping tests returned negative.

== Major results ==
1989
1st Brussel–Zepperen
1993
2nd Tour of Flanders U23
1994
1st Izegem
1st GP du Nord Pas de Calais
2nd Grote Prijs Beeckman-De Caluwé
2nd Halle–Ingooigem
3rd Schaal Sels
3rd GP Stad Vilvoorde
3rd Le Samyn
1995
1st Geetbets
1st Mechelen
1st Wanzele
1996
1st GP Stad Vilvoorde
1st Ruddervoorde
2nd Omloop van het Waasland
3rd Le Samyn
7th Omloop Het Volk
1997
1st Hasselt–Spa–Hasselt
1st Zellik–Galmaarden
1st Grand Prix de Denain
1st Belsele–Puivelde
1st Izegem
2nd Road race, National Championships
2nd Flèche Ardennaise
2nd GP Stad Vilvoorde
3rd Paris–Bourges
3rd Rund um Köln
1998
1st Deinze
1st Paris–Bourges
2nd Bretagne Classic
2nd GP Ouest France - Plouay
3rd BEMER Cyclassics
3rd Overall Tour de la Région Wallonne
4th E3 Prijs Vlaanderen
4th Le Samyn
1999
1st Aalst
1st Profronde van Maastricht
1st Belgian National Road Race Championships
1st Stage 11 Tour de France
3rd Classic Haribo
8th Gent–Wevelgem
8th Brabantse Pijl
2000
1st Deurne
3rd Grote Prijs Beeckman-De Caluwé
3rd Grote Prijs Stad Sint-Niklaas
2001
1st Deurne
1st Profronde van Almelo
5th Brabantse Pijl
5th Belgian National Time Trial Championships
8th Tour of Flanders
6th Paris–Roubaix
10th Scheldeprijs
10th Road race, National Championships
2002
1st Peer
Three Days of De Panne

1st Mountains classification
8th Overall

2nd Overall Tour of Belgium
3rd Belgian National Time Trial Championships
2003
1st Grand Prix d'Ouverture La Marseillaise
1st Boom
2004
1st Stage 7 Tour of Austria
2nd Heusden Koers
2005
1st Wilrijk
1st Tessenderlo
2nd Omloop van het Waasland
3rd Gullegem Koerse
10th Omloop Het Volk

== See also ==
- List of doping cases in cycling
