= Hans De Clercq =

Belgian cyclist

Personal information
- Full name: Hans De Clercq
- Born: 3 March 1969 (age 57) Deinze, Belgium
- Height: 1.87 m (6 ft 2 in)
- Weight: 80 kg (176 lb)

Cycling career
- Sport: Cycling
- Discipline: Road
- Role: Rider

Professional teams
- 1992: TVM–Sanyo (stagiaire)
- 1993: Willy Naessens
- 1994–2000: Palmans–Inco Coating
- 2001–2004: Lotto–Adecco

Hans De Clercq (born 3 March 1969) is a Belgian former racing cyclist. He finished in last place in the 2003 Tour de France.

== Major results ==
1991
3rd Kattekoers
1992
3rd Kattekoers
1995
2nd Kampioenschap van Vlaanderen
1997
2nd Circuit Franco-Belge
3rd Dwars door Vlaanderen
5th GP Rik Van Steenbergen
6th Overall KBC Driedaagse van De Panne-Koksijde
1998
2nd Kampioenschap van Vlaanderen
1999
9th Le Samyn
2000
1st Brussel-Ingooigem
5th Tro-Bro Léon
8th Grand Prix Midtbank
2001
1st Classic Haribo
1st Stage 2 KBC Driedaagse van De Panne-Koksijde
2nd Kuurne-Brussels-Kuurne
9th GP Stad Zottegem
2003
10th Druivenkoers Overijse
