= Bosberg =

Mountain in Belgium

Coordinates: 50.4612°N 3.5619°E

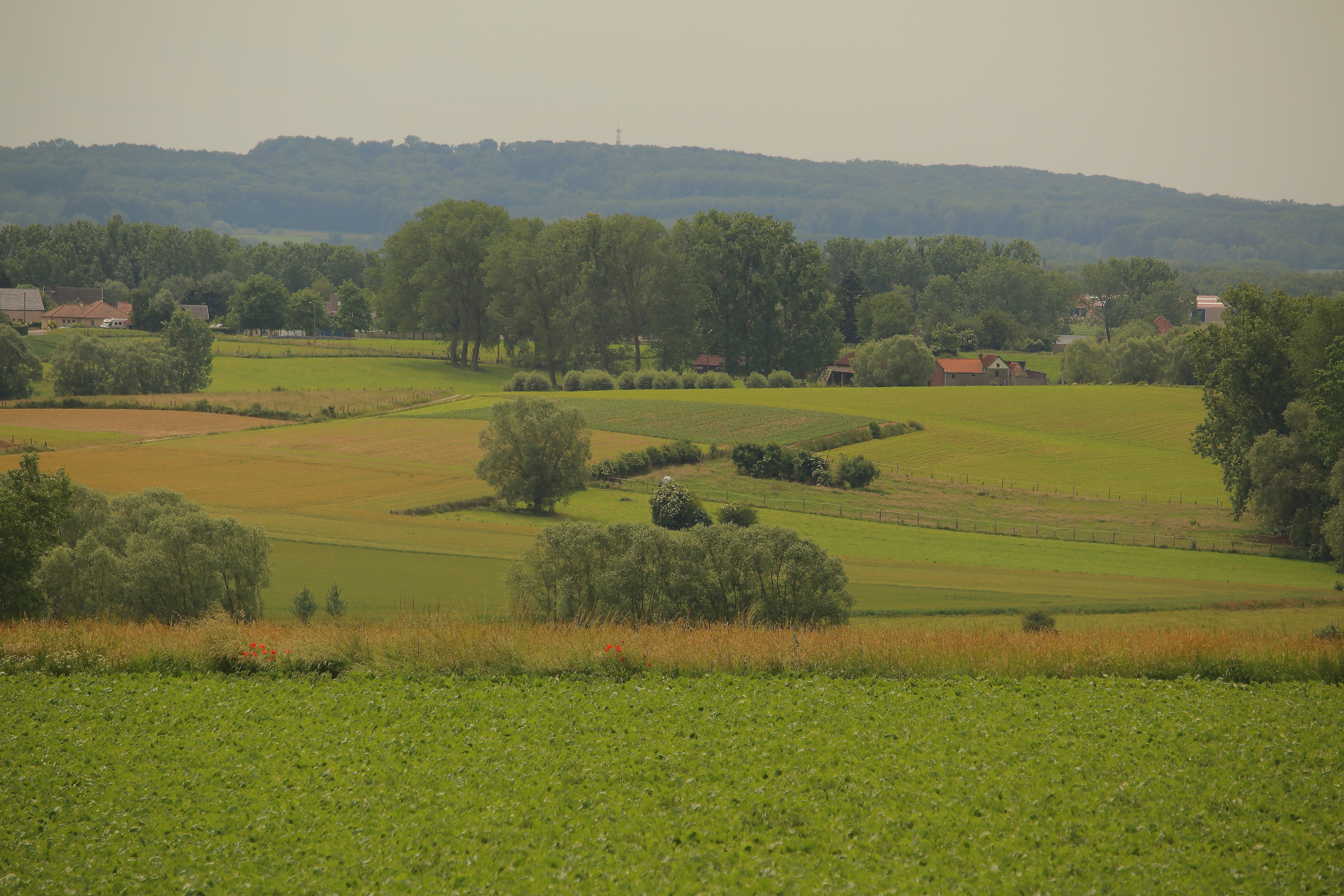
- Location: Flanders; Belgium
- Start: Moerbeke, Geraardsbergen
- Gain in altitude: 57 m (187 ft)
- Length of climb: 986 m (3,235 ft)
- Maximum elevation: 105 m (344 ft)
- Average gradient: 5.8 %
- Maximum gradient: 11 %

The Bosberg (English: Forest Hill) is a hill in the Pajottenland in Belgium with its top located on the border of East Flanders and Flemish Brabant. The road leading to the top is surfaced in concrete in the lower parts and cobbled in the steep upper parts of the hill. The hill is almost completely forested with the Raspaillebos natural reserve.

== Cycling ==
The Bosberg is best known from road bicycle racing. It was the final climb in the Tour of Flanders cycling race from 1973 to 2011. Edwig Van Hooydonck immortalized the climb by making decisive attacks on the Bosberg twice before soloing to the finish in 1989 and 1991.

During its inclusion in the Tour of Flanders, it was addressed immediately after the Muur van Geraardsbergen, with which it formed a duo of steep climbs.

== See also ==
- Raspaillebos
