= Côte de Trieu =

Coordinates: 50.765000°N 3.528000°E

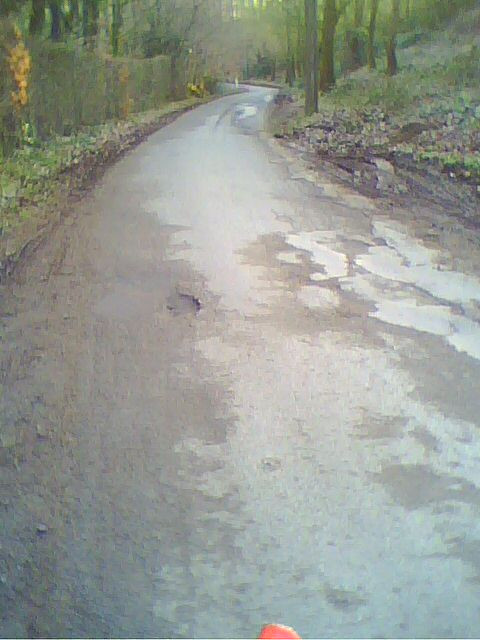
- Upper slopes of the Côte de Trieu in Mont-de-l'Enclus
- Location: Hainaut, Belgium
- Start: Russeignies, Mont-de-l'Enclus
- Gain in altitude: 88 m (289 ft)
- Length of climb: 1.1 km (0.68 mi)
- Maximum elevation: 141 m (463 ft)
- Average gradient: 8 %
- Maximum gradient: 13 %

The Côte de Trieu (in French) or Knokteberg (in Dutch) is a hill in the municipality of Mont-de-l'Enclus, in the Belgian province of Hainaut. The road of the Côte de Trieu is on the south side of the Kluisberg, one of the hill formations in the Flemish Ardennes. The top of the hill, at 141 m above sea level, marks the border between Mont-de-l'Enclus and Kluisbergen, also the border between Wallonia and Flanders.

The climb takes its French name after the hamlet of Trieu, at the southern foot of the hill. Trieu is part of the village of Russeignies, which, in turn, is part of the municipality of Mont-de-l'Enclus, in the north of the province of Hainaut. The climb starts with a gentle slope before gradually steepening to a maximum gradient of 13 % towards the top. With a length of 1,100 metres, it is one of the longer climbs of the region. The top of the hill is near the Flemish hamlet of Knokt, from which the climb takes its Dutch name.

== Cycling ==
The Côte de Trieu is best known from cycling, as it is a regular climb in the Flemish races in spring and is sometimes included in the Tour of Flanders. Since 2018 it features three times in Dwars door Vlaanderen, where it acts as a strategic launchpad at 33 km from the finish. The top of the Côte de Trieu is also the top of Oude Kwaremont, which is on the northern side of the same hill.
