= Denis Zanette =

Italian cyclist

Personal information
- Born: 23 March 1970 Sacile, Italy
- Died: 10 January 2003 (aged 32) Pordenone, Italy

Cycling career
- Sport: Cycling
- Discipline: Road
- Role: Rider

Professional teams
- 1995–1997: Aki–Gipiemme
- 1998: Vini Caldirola
- 1999: Team Polti
- 2000–2001: Liquigas–Pata
- 2002–2003: Fassa Bortolo

Denis Zanette (23 March 1970 – 10 January 2003) was an Italian professional racing cyclist. He rode in eight editions of the Giro d'Italia and made one start in the Tour de France, in 1995. He won a stage in both the 1995 and 2001 Giro d'Italia. He came third in the 2001 Tour of Flanders.

== Death ==
Zanette died suddenly in January 2003 at Pordenone hospital after collapsing at his dentist's office in his hometown Sacile. Investigations were started to reveal if his death was doping-related, since Zanette had been mentioned on a list of riders who had allegedly been in possession of banned drugs during the 2001 Giro d'Italia where he won the 10th stage. The cause of death was later revealed as heart failure due to a probable heart disease aggravated by a neglected flu.

He was survived by his wife Manuela and daughters Anna and Paola.

== Major results ==
1991
2nd Piccola Sanremo
1993
2nd Trofeo Città di San Vendemiano
1994
1st Astico–Brenta
1st Stage 6 Giro della Valle d'Aosta
3rd Gran Premio di Poggiana
1995
1st Stage 18 Giro d'Italia
2nd Giro di Toscana
5th Overall Four Days of Dunkirk
10th Overall Euskal Bizikleta
1996
1st Stage 1 Settimana Internazionale di Coppi e Bartali
4th Overall Four Days of Dunkirk
9th Overall Three Days of De Panne
1997
4th Overall Three Days of De Panne
7th GP de la Ville de Rennes
1998
1st Stage 8 Volta a Portugal
1999
3rd Overall Three Days of De Panne
9th Tour of Flanders
9th Overall Four Days of Dunkirk
2000
1st Stage 1 Danmark Rundt
4th Overall Regio-Tour
4th Coppa Bernocchi
7th Coppa Sabatini
2001
1st Stage 10 Giro d'Italia
3rd Tour of Flanders
2002
3rd Millemetri del Corso di Mestre

=== Grand Tour general classification results timeline ===
Grand Tour	1995	1996	1997	1998	1999	2000	2001	2002
Giro d'Italia	71	54	77	DNF	107	DNF	102	119
Tour de France	DNF	—	—	—	—	—	—	—
Vuelta a España	—	71	—	—	—	—	—	104

Legend
—	Did not compete
DNF	Did not finish
