= 2019 Giro d'Italia, Stage 12 to Stage 21 =

Cycling race stages

The 2019 Giro d'Italia is the 102nd edition of the Giro d'Italia, one of cycling's Grand Tours. The Giro began in Bologna with an individual time trial on 11 May, and Stage 12 occurred on 23 May with a stage from Cuneo. The race finished in Verona on 2 June.

== Stage 12 ==
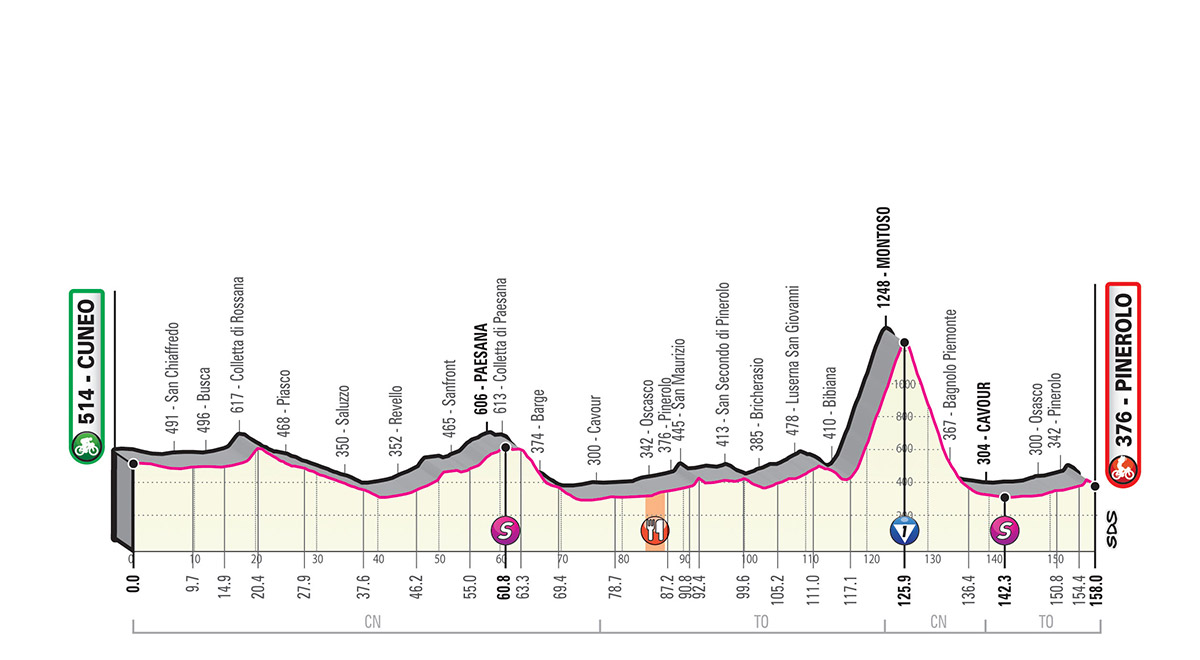

23 May 2019 - Cuneo to Pinerolo, 146 km (91 mi)

The first high mountain stage includes the category 1 climb to Montoso, at an altitude of 1,248 m (4,094 ft), over a distance of 8.85 km (5.5 mi). The climb has an average gradient of 9.5%. The riders will also pass over the short but steep climb of the Via Principi d'Acaja, on two occasions, along the route. The first climb will occur before the climb to Montoso, and the second climb will occur in the last 3 km (1.9 mi) of the stage.

Stage 12 result
| Rank | Rider | Team | Time |
|---|---|---|---|
| 1 | Cesare Benedetti (ITA) | Bora–Hansgrohe | 3h 41' 49" |
| 2 | Damiano Caruso (ITA) | Bahrain–Merida | + 0" |
| 3 | Eddie Dunbar (IRL) | Team INEOS | + 0" |
| 4 | Gianluca Brambilla (ITA) | Trek–Segafredo | + 2" |
| 5 | Eros Capecchi (ITA) | Deceuninck–Quick-Step | + 6" |
| 6 | Jan Polanc (SLO) | UAE Team Emirates | + 25" |
| 7 | Matteo Montaguti (ITA) | Androni Giocattoli–Sidermec | + 34" |
| 8 | Thomas De Gendt (BEL) | Lotto–Soudal | + 2' 36" |
| 9 | Francesco Gavazzi (ITA) | Androni Giocattoli–Sidermec | + 2' 36" |
| 10 | Manuel Senni (ITA) | Bardiani–CSF | + 2' 38" |

General classification after stage 12
| Rank | Rider | Team | Time |
|---|---|---|---|
| 1 | Jan Polanc (SLO) | UAE Team Emirates | 48h 49' 40" |
| 2 | Primož Roglič (SLO) | Team Jumbo–Visma | + 4' 07" |
| 3 | Valerio Conti (ITA) | UAE Team Emirates | + 4' 51" |
| 4 | Eros Capecchi (ITA) | Deceuninck–Quick-Step | + 5' 02" |
| 5 | Vincenzo Nibali (ITA) | Bahrain–Merida | + 5' 51" |
| 6 | Bauke Mollema (NED) | Trek–Segafredo | + 6' 02" |
| 7 | Rafał Majka (POL) | Bora–Hansgrohe | + 7' 00" |
| 8 | Richard Carapaz (ECU) | Movistar Team | + 7' 23" |
| 9 | Andrey Amador (CRC) | Movistar Team | + 7' 30" |
| 10 | Hugh Carthy (GBR) | EF Education First | + 7' 33" |

== Stage 13 ==
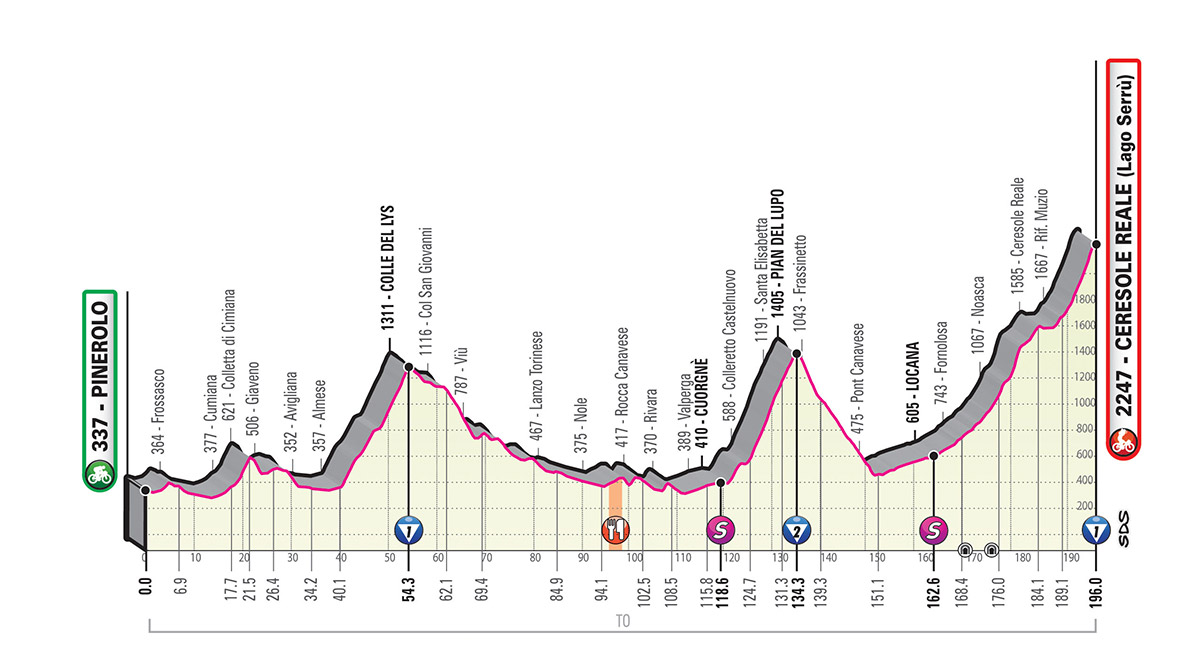

24 May 2019 - Pinerolo to Ceresole Reale (Serrù Lake), 188 km (117 mi)

Stage 13 result
| Rank | Rider | Team | Time |
|---|---|---|---|
| 1 | Ilnur Zakarin (RUS) | Team Katusha–Alpecin | 5h 34' 40" |
| 2 | Mikel Nieve (ESP) | Mitchelton–Scott | + 35" |
| 3 | Mikel Landa (ESP) | Movistar Team | + 1' 20" |
| 4 | Richard Carapaz (ECU) | Movistar Team | + 1' 38" |
| 5 | Bauke Mollema (NED) | Trek–Segafredo | + 1' 45" |
| 6 | Rafał Majka (POL) | Bora–Hansgrohe | + 2' 07" |
| 7 | Primož Roglič (SLO) | Team Jumbo–Visma | + 2' 57" |
| 8 | Vincenzo Nibali (ITA) | Bahrain–Merida | + 2' 57" |
| 9 | Pavel Sivakov (RUS) | Team INEOS | + 3' 34" |
| 10 | Davide Formolo (ITA) | Bora–Hansgrohe | + 3' 50" |

General classification after stage 13
| Rank | Rider | Team | Time |
|---|---|---|---|
| 1 | Jan Polanc (SLO) | UAE Team Emirates | 54h 28' 59" |
| 2 | Primož Roglič (SLO) | Team Jumbo–Visma | + 2' 25" |
| 3 | Ilnur Zakarin (RUS) | Team Katusha–Alpecin | + 2' 56" |
| 4 | Bauke Mollema (NED) | Trek–Segafredo | + 3' 06" |
| 5 | Vincenzo Nibali (ITA) | Bahrain–Merida | + 4' 09" |
| 6 | Richard Carapaz (ECU) | Movistar Team | + 4' 22" |
| 7 | Rafał Majka (POL) | Bora–Hansgrohe | + 4' 28" |
| 8 | Mikel Landa (ESP) | Movistar Team | + 5' 08" |
| 9 | Pavel Sivakov (RUS) | Team INEOS | + 7' 13" |
| 10 | Miguel Ángel López (COL) | Astana | + 7' 48" |

== Stage 14 ==
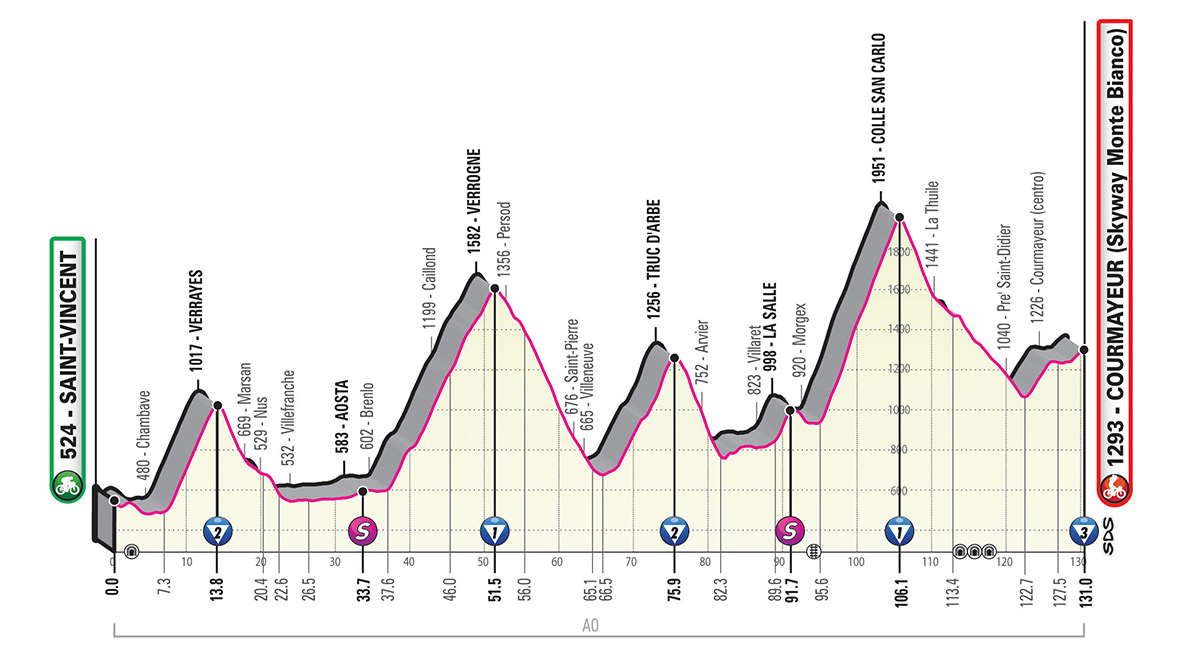

25 May 2019 - Saint-Vincent to Courmayeur (Skyway Monte Bianco), 131 km (81 mi)

Stage 14 result
| Rank | Rider | Team | Time |
|---|---|---|---|
| 1 | Richard Carapaz (ECU) | Movistar Team | 4h 02' 03" |
| 2 | Simon Yates (GBR) | Mitchelton–Scott | + 1' 32" |
| 3 | Vincenzo Nibali (ITA) | Bahrain–Merida | + 1' 54" |
| 4 | Rafał Majka (POL) | Bora–Hansgrohe | + 1' 54" |
| 5 | Mikel Landa (ESP) | Movistar Team | + 1' 54" |
| 6 | Miguel Ángel López (COL) | Astana | + 1' 54" |
| 7 | Pavel Sivakov (RUS) | Team INEOS | + 1' 54" |
| 8 | Primož Roglič (SLO) | Team Jumbo–Visma | + 1' 54" |
| 9 | Joe Dombrowski (USA) | EF Education First | + 1' 54" |
| 10 | Damiano Caruso (ITA) | Bahrain–Merida | + 2' 01" |

General classification after stage 14
| Rank | Rider | Team | Time |
|---|---|---|---|
| 1 | Richard Carapaz (ECU) | Movistar Team | 58h 35' 34" |
| 2 | Primož Roglič (SLO) | Team Jumbo–Visma | + 7" |
| 3 | Vincenzo Nibali (ITA) | Bahrain–Merida | + 1' 47" |
| 4 | Rafał Majka (POL) | Bora–Hansgrohe | + 2' 10" |
| 5 | Mikel Landa (ESP) | Movistar Team | + 2' 50" |
| 6 | Bauke Mollema (NED) | Trek–Segafredo | + 2' 58" |
| 7 | Jan Polanc (SLO) | UAE Team Emirates | + 3' 29" |
| 8 | Pavel Sivakov (RUS) | Team INEOS | + 4' 55" |
| 9 | Simon Yates (GBR) | Mitchelton–Scott | + 5' 28" |
| 10 | Miguel Ángel López (COL) | Astana | + 5' 30" |

== Stage 15 ==
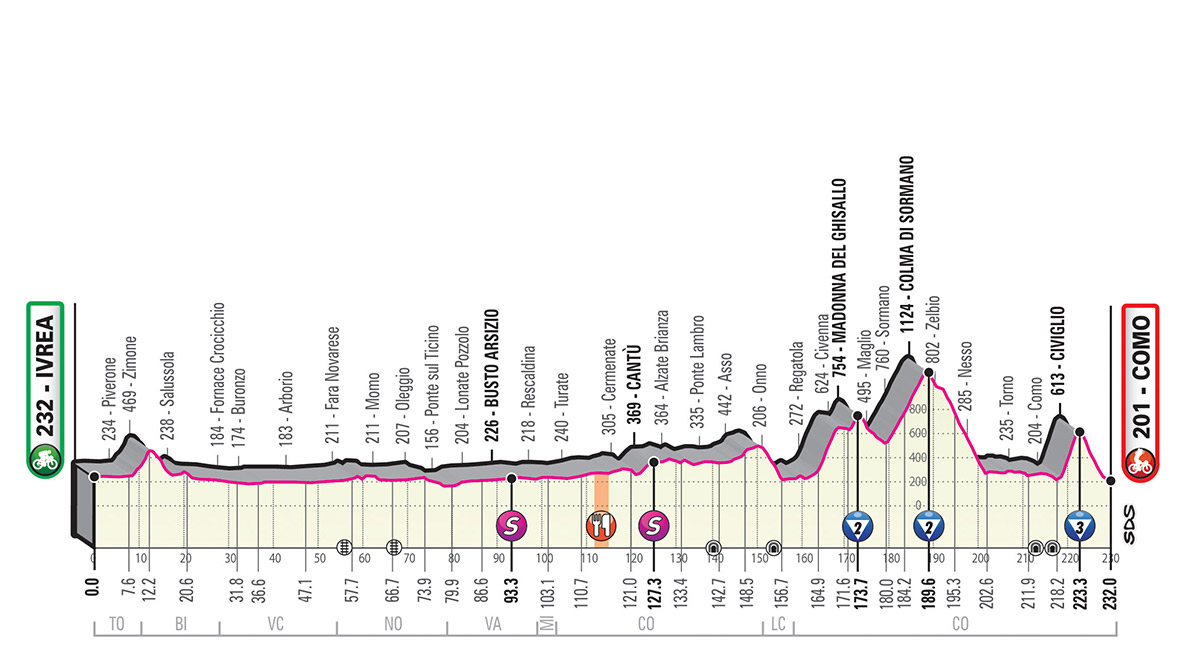

26 May 2019 - Ivrea to Como, 237 km (147 mi)

Stage 15 result
| Rank | Rider | Team | Time |
|---|---|---|---|
| 1 | Dario Cataldo (ITA) | Astana | 5h 48' 15" |
| 2 | Mattia Cattaneo (ITA) | Androni Giocattoli–Sidermec | + 0" |
| 3 | Simon Yates (GBR) | Mitchelton–Scott | + 11" |
| 4 | Hugh Carthy (GBR) | EF Education First | + 11" |
| 5 | Richard Carapaz (ECU) | Movistar Team | + 11" |
| 6 | Vincenzo Nibali (ITA) | Bahrain–Merida | + 11" |
| 7 | Miguel Ángel López (COL) | Astana | + 36" |
| 8 | Rafał Majka (POL) | Bora–Hansgrohe | + 36" |
| 9 | Domenico Pozzovivo (ITA) | Bahrain–Merida | + 36" |
| 10 | Mikel Landa (ESP) | Movistar Team | + 36" |

General classification after stage 15
| Rank | Rider | Team | Time |
|---|---|---|---|
| 1 | Richard Carapaz (ECU) | Movistar Team | 64h 24' 00" |
| 2 | Primož Roglič (SLO) | Team Jumbo–Visma | + 47" |
| 3 | Vincenzo Nibali (ITA) | Bahrain–Merida | + 1' 47" |
| 4 | Rafał Majka (POL) | Bora–Hansgrohe | + 2' 35" |
| 5 | Mikel Landa (ESP) | Movistar Team | + 3' 15" |
| 6 | Bauke Mollema (NED) | Trek–Segafredo | + 3' 38" |
| 7 | Jan Polanc (SLO) | UAE Team Emirates | + 4' 12" |
| 8 | Simon Yates (GBR) | Mitchelton–Scott | + 5' 24" |
| 9 | Pavel Sivakov (RUS) | Team INEOS | + 5' 48" |
| 10 | Miguel Ángel López (COL) | Astana | + 5' 55" |

== Rest day 2 ==
27 May 2019

== Stage 16 ==
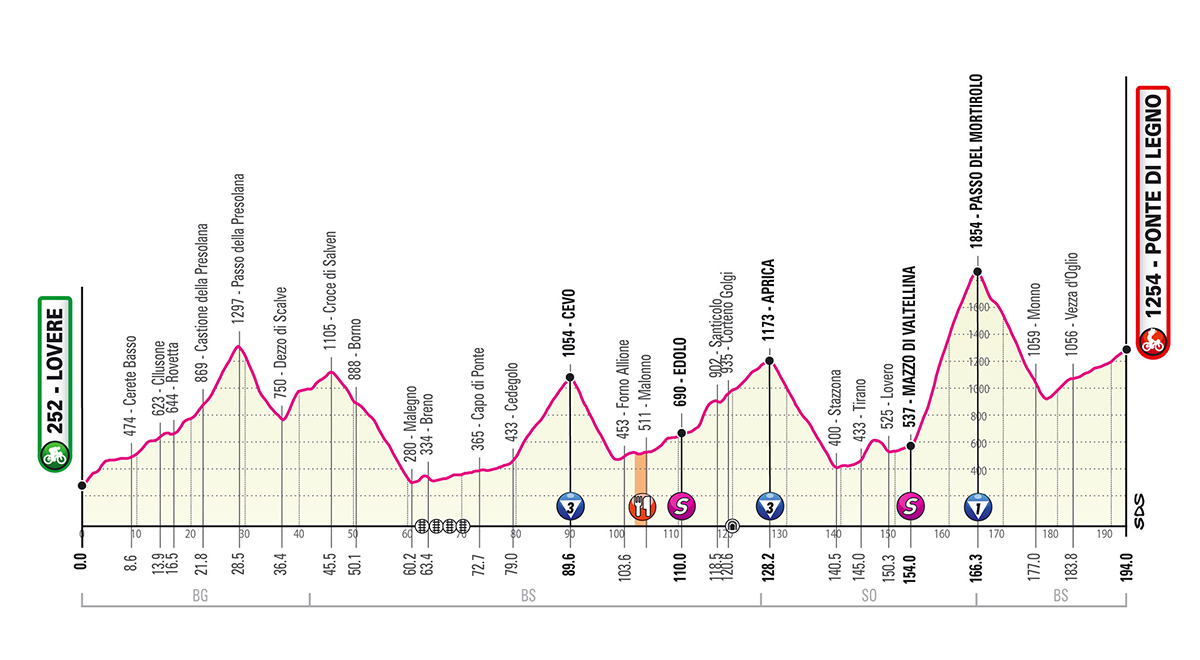

28 May 2019 - Lovere to Ponte di Legno, 194 km (121 mi) (Note: Stage 16 was intended to be 226 km (140 mi), but was rerouted due to bad weather.)

Stage 16 result
| Rank | Rider | Team | Time |
|---|---|---|---|
| 1 | Giulio Ciccone (ITA) | Trek–Segafredo | 5h 36' 24" |
| 2 | Jan Hirt (CZE) | Astana | + 0" |
| 3 | Fausto Masnada (ITA) | Androni Giocattoli–Sidermec | + 1' 20" |
| 4 | Vincenzo Nibali (ITA) | Bahrain–Merida | + 1' 41" |
| 5 | Hugh Carthy (GBR) | EF Education First | + 1' 41" |
| 6 | Richard Carapaz (ECU) | Movistar Team | + 1' 41" |
| 7 | Mikel Landa (ESP) | Movistar Team | + 1' 41" |
| 8 | Joe Dombrowski (USA) | EF Education First | + 1' 41" |
| 9 | Damiano Caruso (ITA) | Bahrain–Merida | + 1' 49" |
| 10 | Mattia Cattaneo (ITA) | Androni Giocattoli–Sidermec | + 2' 03" |

General classification after stage 16
| Rank | Rider | Team | Time |
|---|---|---|---|
| 1 | Richard Carapaz (ECU) | Movistar Team | 70h 02' 05" |
| 2 | Vincenzo Nibali (ITA) | Bahrain–Merida | + 1' 47" |
| 3 | Primož Roglič (SLO) | Team Jumbo–Visma | + 2' 09" |
| 4 | Mikel Landa (ESP) | Movistar Team | + 3' 15" |
| 5 | Bauke Mollema (NED) | Trek–Segafredo | + 5' 00" |
| 6 | Rafał Majka (POL) | Bora–Hansgrohe | + 5' 40" |
| 7 | Miguel Ángel López (COL) | Astana | + 6' 17" |
| 8 | Simon Yates (GBR) | Mitchelton–Scott | + 6' 46" |
| 9 | Pavel Sivakov (RUS) | Team INEOS | + 7' 51" |
| 10 | Jan Polanc (SLO) | UAE Team Emirates | + 8' 06" |

== Stage 17 ==
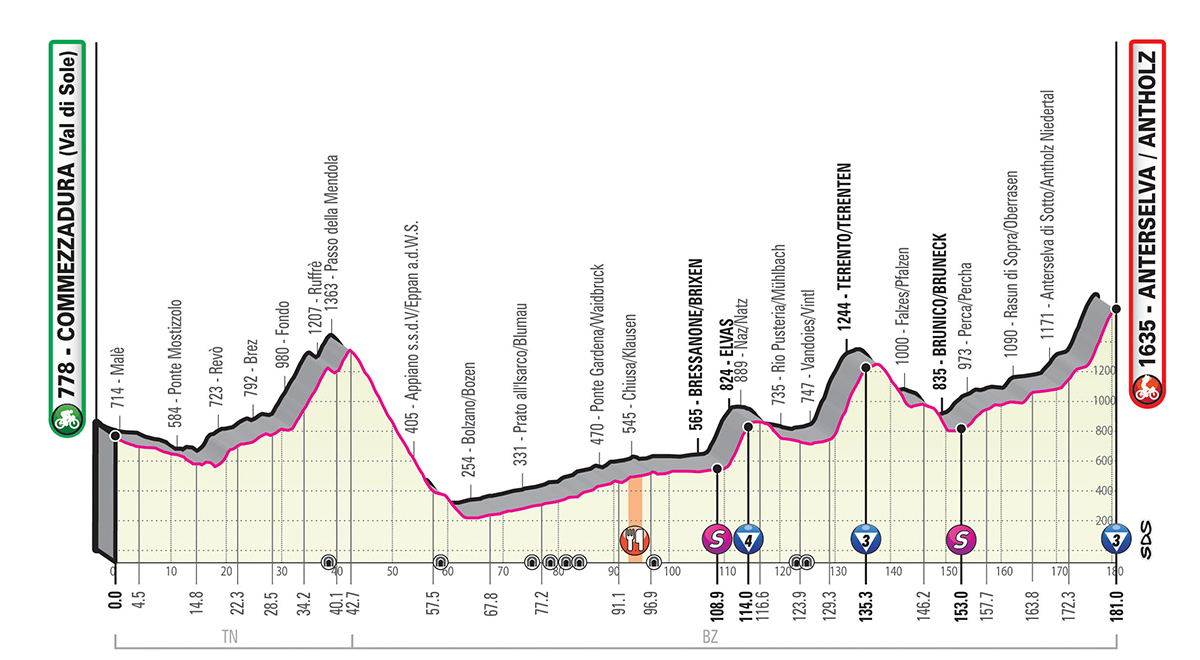

29 May 2019 - Commezzadura (Val di Sole) to Anterselva/Antholz, 180 km (110 mi)

Stage 17 result
| Rank | Rider | Team | Time |
|---|---|---|---|
| 1 | Nans Peters (FRA) | AG2R La Mondiale | 4h 41' 34" |
| 2 | Esteban Chaves (COL) | Mitchelton–Scott | + 1' 34" |
| 3 | Davide Formolo (ITA) | Bora–Hansgrohe | + 1' 51" |
| 4 | Fausto Masnada (ITA) | Androni Giocattoli–Sidermec | + 1' 51" |
| 5 | Krists Neilands (LAT) | Israel Cycling Academy | + 1' 51" |
| 6 | Tanel Kangert (EST) | EF Education First | + 2' 02" |
| 7 | Valerio Conti (ITA) | UAE Team Emirates | + 2' 08" |
| 8 | Gianluca Brambilla (ITA) | Trek–Segafredo | + 2' 08" |
| 9 | Chris Hamilton (AUS) | Team Sunweb | + 2' 22" |
| 10 | Andrea Vendrame (ITA) | Androni Giocattoli–Sidermec | + 2' 34" |

General classification after stage 17
| Rank | Rider | Team | Time |
|---|---|---|---|
| 1 | Richard Carapaz (ECU) | Movistar Team | 74h 48' 18" |
| 2 | Vincenzo Nibali (ITA) | Bahrain–Merida | + 1' 54" |
| 3 | Primož Roglič (SLO) | Team Jumbo–Visma | + 2' 16" |
| 4 | Mikel Landa (ESP) | Movistar Team | + 3' 03" |
| 5 | Bauke Mollema (NED) | Trek–Segafredo | + 5' 07" |
| 6 | Miguel Ángel López (COL) | Astana | + 6' 17" |
| 7 | Rafał Majka (POL) | Bora–Hansgrohe | + 6' 48" |
| 8 | Simon Yates (GBR) | Mitchelton–Scott | + 7' 13" |
| 9 | Pavel Sivakov (RUS) | Team INEOS | + 8' 21" |
| 10 | Davide Formolo (ITA) | Bora–Hansgrohe | + 8' 59" |

== Stage 18 ==
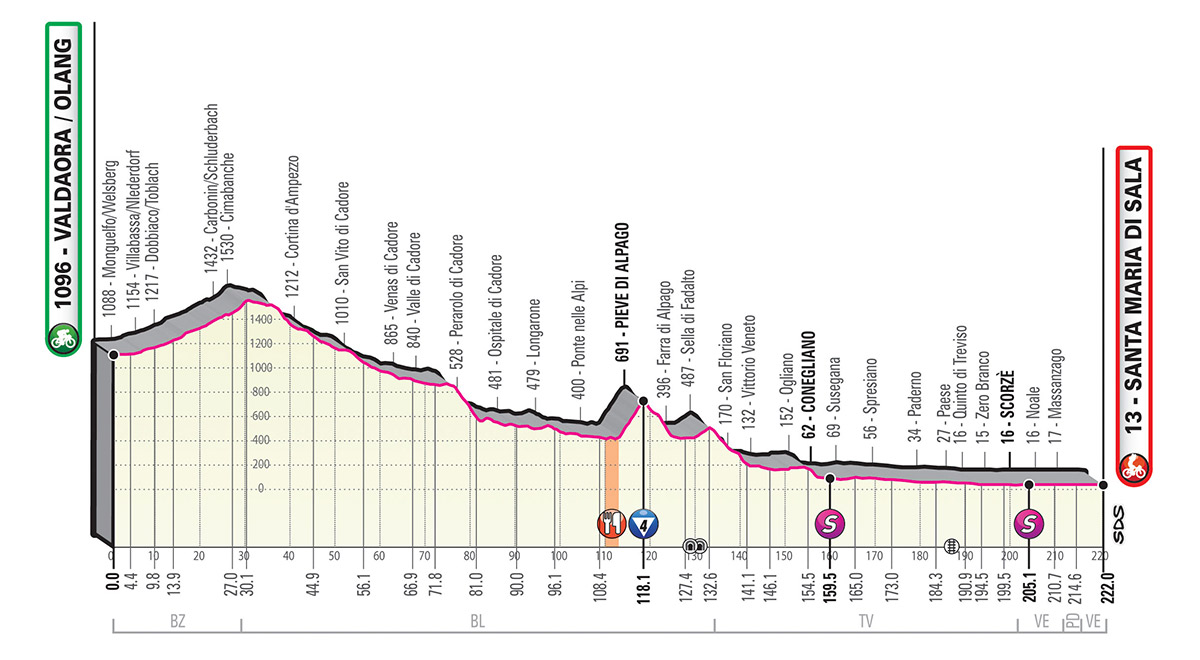

30 May 2019 - Valdaora/Olang to Santa Maria di Sala, 220 km (140 mi)

Stage 18 result
| Rank | Rider | Team | Time |
|---|---|---|---|
| 1 | Damiano Cima (ITA) | Nippo–Vini Fantini–Faizanè | 4h 56' 04" |
| 2 | Pascal Ackermann (GER) | Bora–Hansgrohe | + 0" |
| 3 | Simone Consonni (ITA) | UAE Team Emirates | + 0" |
| 4 | Florian Sénéchal (FRA) | Deceuninck–Quick-Step | + 0" |
| 5 | Ryan Gibbons (SAF) | Team Dimension Data | + 0" |
| 6 | Manuel Belletti (ITA) | Androni Giocattoli–Sidermec | + 0" |
| 7 | Davide Cimolai (ITA) | Israel Cycling Academy | + 0" |
| 8 | Arnaud Démare (FRA) | Groupama–FDJ | + 0" |
| 9 | Sean Bennett (USA) | EF Education First | + 0" |
| 10 | Mirco Maestri (ITA) | Bardiani–CSF | + 0" |

General classification after stage 18
| Rank | Rider | Team | Time |
|---|---|---|---|
| 1 | Richard Carapaz (ECU) | Movistar Team | 79h 44' 22" |
| 2 | Vincenzo Nibali (ITA) | Bahrain–Merida | + 1' 54" |
| 3 | Primož Roglič (SLO) | Team Jumbo–Visma | + 2' 16" |
| 4 | Mikel Landa (ESP) | Movistar Team | + 3' 03" |
| 5 | Bauke Mollema (NED) | Trek–Segafredo | + 5' 07" |
| 6 | Miguel Ángel López (COL) | Astana | + 6' 17" |
| 7 | Rafał Majka (POL) | Bora–Hansgrohe | + 6' 48" |
| 8 | Simon Yates (GBR) | Mitchelton–Scott | + 7' 13" |
| 9 | Pavel Sivakov (RUS) | Team INEOS | + 8' 21" |
| 10 | Davide Formolo (ITA) | Bora–Hansgrohe | + 8' 59" |

== Stage 19 ==
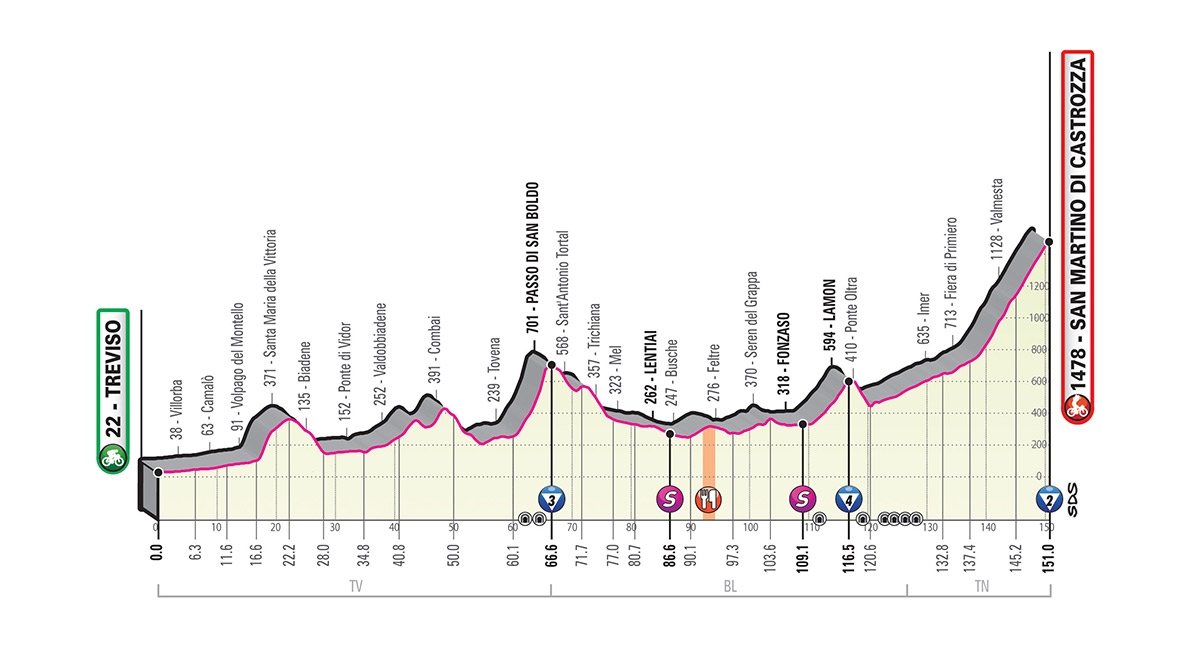

31 May 2019 - Treviso to San Martino di Castrozza, 151 km (94 mi)

Stage 19 result
| Rank | Rider | Team | Time |
|---|---|---|---|
| 1 | Esteban Chaves (COL) | Mitchelton–Scott | 4h 01' 31" |
| 2 | Andrea Vendrame (ITA) | Androni Giocattoli–Sidermec | + 10" |
| 3 | Amaro Antunes (POR) | CCC Team | + 12" |
| 4 | Giovanni Carboni (ITA) | Bardiani–CSF | + 24" |
| 5 | Pieter Serry (BEL) | Deceuninck–Quick-Step | + 32" |
| 6 | François Bidard (FRA) | AG2R La Mondiale | + 35" |
| 7 | Marco Canola (ITA) | Nippo–Vini Fantini–Faizanè | + 1' 02" |
| 8 | Manuele Boaro (ITA) | Astana | + 1' 37" |
| 9 | Manuel Senni (ITA) | Bardiani–CSF | + 1' 53" |
| 10 | Olivier Le Gac (FRA) | Groupama–FDJ | + 2' 33" |

General classification after stage 19
| Rank | Rider | Team | Time |
|---|---|---|---|
| 1 | Richard Carapaz (ECU) | Movistar Team | 83h 52' 22" |
| 2 | Vincenzo Nibali (ITA) | Bahrain–Merida | + 1' 54" |
| 3 | Primož Roglič (SLO) | Team Jumbo–Visma | + 2' 16" |
| 4 | Mikel Landa (ESP) | Movistar Team | + 3' 03" |
| 5 | Bauke Mollema (NED) | Trek–Segafredo | + 5' 07" |
| 6 | Miguel Ángel López (COL) | Astana | + 5' 33" |
| 7 | Rafał Majka (POL) | Bora–Hansgrohe | + 6' 48" |
| 8 | Simon Yates (GBR) | Mitchelton–Scott | + 7' 17" |
| 9 | Pavel Sivakov (RUS) | Team INEOS | + 8' 27" |
| 10 | Davide Formolo (ITA) | Bora–Hansgrohe | + 10' 06" |

== Stage 20 ==
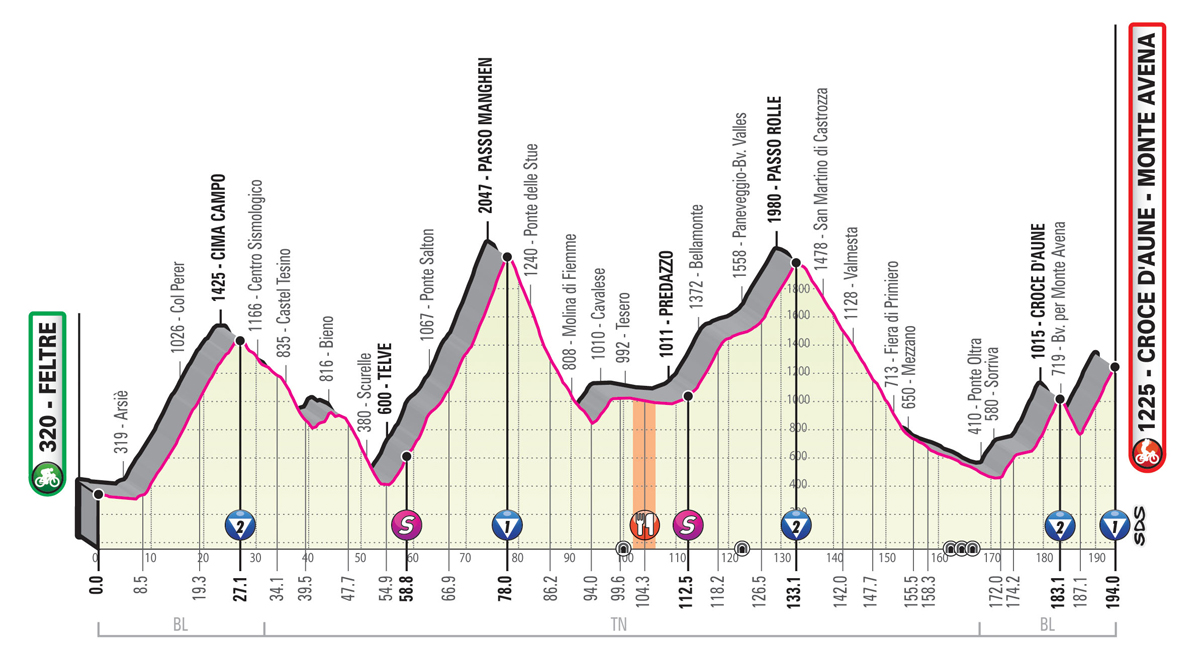

1 June 2019 - Feltre to Croce d’Aune-Monte Avena, 193 km (120 mi)

A spectator caused Miguel Ángel López to be knocked off his bike with 5 km (3.1 mi) remaining, losing time on the group of favourites. López responded by hitting the spectator, but escaped sanction from the race officials. After receiving a long push uphill from a spectator on the 11 km (6.8 mi) climb of the Croce d'Aune, Primož Roglič was given a ten-second penalty for not refusing help.

Stage 20 result
| Rank | Rider | Team | Time |
|---|---|---|---|
| 1 | Pello Bilbao (ESP) | Astana | 5h 46' 02" |
| 2 | Mikel Landa (ESP) | Movistar Team | + 0" |
| 3 | Giulio Ciccone (ITA) | Trek–Segafredo | + 2" |
| 4 | Richard Carapaz (ECU) | Movistar Team | + 4" |
| 5 | Vincenzo Nibali (ITA) | Bahrain–Merida | + 4" |
| 6 | Tanel Kangert (EST) | EF Education First | + 15" |
| 7 | Mikel Nieve (ESP) | Mitchelton–Scott | + 15" |
| 8 | Valentin Madouas (FRA) | Groupama–FDJ | + 25" |
| 9 | Rafał Majka (POL) | Bora–Hansgrohe | + 44" |
| 10 | Domenico Pozzovivo (ITA) | Bahrain–Merida | + 44" |

General classification after stage 20
| Rank | Rider | Team | Time |
|---|---|---|---|
| 1 | Richard Carapaz (ECU) | Movistar Team | 89h 38' 28" |
| 2 | Vincenzo Nibali (ITA) | Bahrain–Merida | + 1' 54" |
| 3 | Mikel Landa (ESP) | Movistar Team | + 2' 53" |
| 4 | Primož Roglič (SLO) | Team Jumbo–Visma | + 3' 16" |
| 5 | Bauke Mollema (NED) | Trek–Segafredo | + 5' 51" |
| 6 | Miguel Ángel López (COL) | Astana | + 7' 18" |
| 7 | Rafał Majka (POL) | Bora–Hansgrohe | + 7' 28" |
| 8 | Simon Yates (GBR) | Mitchelton–Scott | + 8' 01" |
| 9 | Pavel Sivakov (RUS) | Team INEOS | + 9' 11" |
| 10 | Ilnur Zakarin (RUS) | Team Katusha–Alpecin | + 12' 50" |

== Stage 21 ==
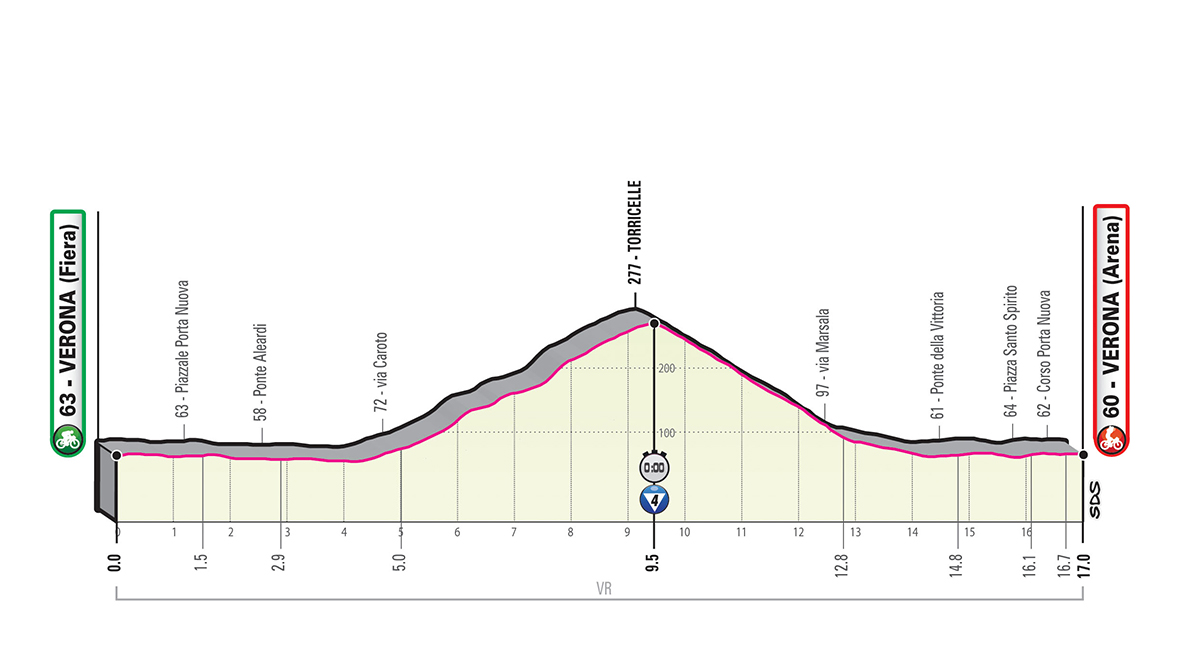

2 June 2019 - Verona to Verona, 15.6 km (9.7 mi) (ITT)

The riders departed in reverse order to the general classification, at one-minute intervals, starting at 13:45 CEST. The top twenty riders, on the general classification, departed at three-minute intervals.

Stage 21 result
| Rank | Rider | Team | Time |
|---|---|---|---|
| 1 | Chad Haga (USA) | Team Sunweb | 22' 07" |
| 2 | Victor Campenaerts (BEL) | Lotto–Soudal | + 4" |
| 3 | Thomas De Gendt (BEL) | Lotto–Soudal | + 6" |
| 4 | Damiano Caruso (ITA) | Bahrain–Merida | + 9" |
| 5 | Tobias Ludvigsson (SWE) | Groupama–FDJ | + 11" |
| 6 | Josef Černý (CZE) | CCC Team | + 11" |
| 7 | Pello Bilbao (ESP) | Astana | + 17" |
| 8 | Mattia Cattaneo (ITA) | Androni Giocattoli–Sidermec | + 20" |
| 9 | Vincenzo Nibali (ITA) | Bahrain–Merida | + 23" |
| 10 | Primož Roglič (SLO) | Team Jumbo–Visma | + 26" |

Final general classification
| Rank | Rider | Team | Time |
|---|---|---|---|
| 1 | Richard Carapaz (ECU) | Movistar Team | 90h 01' 47" |
| 2 | Vincenzo Nibali (ITA) | Bahrain–Merida | + 1' 05" |
| 3 | Primož Roglič (SLO) | Team Jumbo–Visma | + 2' 30" |
| 4 | Mikel Landa (ESP) | Movistar Team | + 2' 38" |
| 5 | Bauke Mollema (NED) | Trek–Segafredo | + 5' 43" |
| 6 | Rafał Majka (POL) | Bora–Hansgrohe | + 6' 56" |
| 7 | Miguel Ángel López (COL) | Astana | + 7' 26" |
| 8 | Simon Yates (GBR) | Mitchelton–Scott | + 7' 49" |
| 9 | Pavel Sivakov (RUS) | Team INEOS | + 8' 56" |
| 10 | Ilnur Zakarin (RUS) | Team Katusha–Alpecin | + 12' 14" |
