= 2019 Giro d'Italia =

2019 UCI World Tour, race 23 of 38
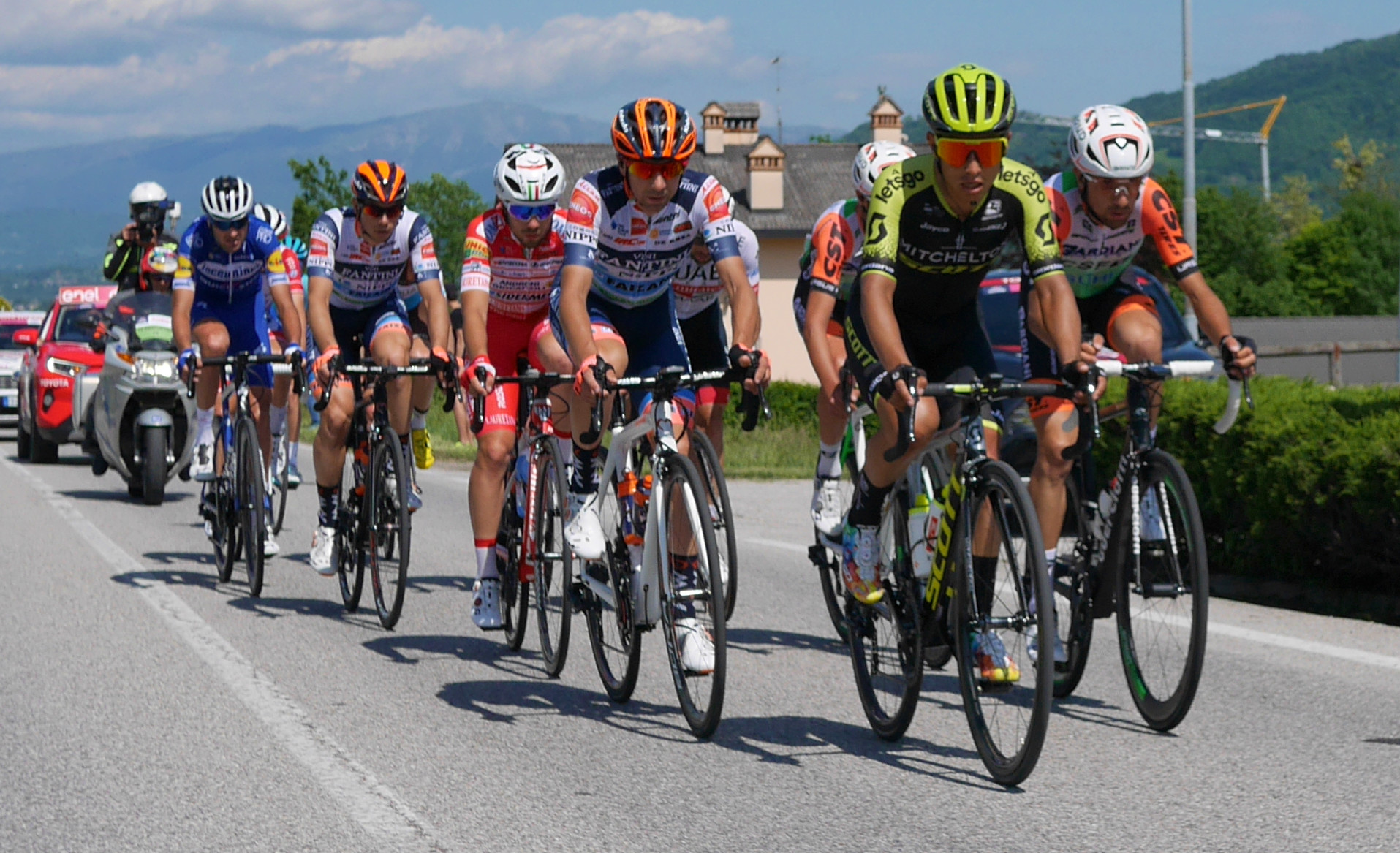
- A group of riders on Stage 19

Race details
- Dates: 11 May – 2 June 2019
- Stages: 21
- Distance: 3,546.8 km (2,203.9 mi)
- Winning time: 90h 01'47"

Results
Jersey awarded to the overall winner	Winner	Richard Carapaz (ECU)	(Movistar Team)
	Second	Vincenzo Nibali (ITA)	(Bahrain–Merida)
	Third	Primož Roglič (SLO)	(Team Jumbo–Visma)
Jersey awarded to the points classification winner	Points	Pascal Ackermann (GER)	(Bora–Hansgrohe)
Jersey awarded to the mountains classification winner	Mountains	Giulio Ciccone (ITA)	(Trek–Segafredo)
Jersey awarded to the young rider classification winner	Young rider	Miguel Ángel López (COL)	(Astana)
	Sprints	Fausto Masnada (ITA)	(Androni Giocattoli–Sidermec)
Jersey awarded to the combativity classification winner	Combativity	Fausto Masnada (ITA)	(Androni Giocattoli–Sidermec)
	Team	(Spain) Movistar Team	

The 2019 Giro d'Italia was a three-week Grand Tour cycling stage race organised by RCS Sport that took place mainly in Italy, between 11 May and 2 June 2019. The race was the 102nd edition of the Giro d'Italia and was the first Grand Tour of the 2019 cycling season. The race started with an individual time trial in Bologna, and finished with another time-trial in Verona. The race was won by Richard Carapaz (Movistar Team), who became the first Ecuadorian rider to win the Giro d'Italia. Italian Vincenzo Nibali (Bahrain–Merida) finished 2nd, with Slovenian rider Primož Roglič (Team Jumbo–Visma) in 3rd place. Carapaz also became the second South American rider to win the Giro, after Nairo Quintana in 2014.

Pascal Ackermann (Bora–Hansgrohe) narrowly won the points classification before Arnaud Démare (Groupama–FDJ), with Damiano Cima (Nippo–Vini Fantini–Faizanè) in third place. Giulio Ciccone (Trek–Segafredo) won mountains classification after leading it through 20 of the race's 21 stages, and Miguel Ángel López (Astana) won the young rider classification. The team classification was won by Movistar Team.

== Teams ==
All 18 UCI WorldTeams were automatically invited and were obliged to attend the race. Four wildcard UCI Professional Continental teams were also selected. Because of an agreement between RCS Sport and the organisers of the Coppa Italia di ciclismo (the Italian Road Cycling Cup) one of the four wildcards is traditionally reserved for the overall cup winner. One of the wildcards was therefore awarded to Androni Giocattoli–Sidermec. On 25 January 2019, the race organisers announced that the other three wildcards were awarded to Bardiani–CSF, Israel Cycling Academy and Nippo–Vini Fantini–Faizanè. All of the wildcard teams had previously participated in the Giro, and three out of the four teams participated in the previous year. The one exception was Nippo–Vini Fantini, whose last participation in the Giro was in 2016. Each team started with eight riders. The on-stage presentation of the teams took place in Bologna on 9 May, two days before the opening stage.

The teams entering the race were:

UCI WorldTeams

- AG2R La Mondiale
- Astana
- Bahrain–Merida
- Bora–Hansgrohe
- CCC Team
- Deceuninck–Quick-Step
- EF Education First
- Groupama–FDJ
- Team Katusha–Alpecin
- Lotto–Soudal
- Mitchelton–Scott
- Movistar Team
- Team Dimension Data
- Team Jumbo–Visma
- Team Sunweb
- Trek–Segafredo
- UAE Team Emirates
- Team INEOS

UCI Professional Continental teams

- Androni Giocattoli–Sidermec
- Bardiani–CSF
- Israel Cycling Academy
- Nippo–Vini Fantini–Faizanè

== Pre-race favourites ==
Two previous Giro d'Italia champions, Vincenzo Nibali (Bahrain–Merida) and Tom Dumoulin (Team Sunweb), are considered to be among the favorites for the Maglia Rosa, together with Miguel Ángel López (Astana), Mikel Landa (Movistar Team), Primož Roglič (Team Jumbo–Visma) and Simon Yates (Mitchelton–Scott).

Other riders believed to be competitive in the general classification were Richard Carapaz (Movistar Team), Esteban Chaves (Mitchelton–Scott), Davide Formolo (Bora–Hansgrohe), Ion Izagirre (Astana), Bob Jungels (Deceuninck–Quick-Step), Rafał Majka (Bora–Hansgrohe), Bauke Mollema (Trek–Segafredo), Ben O'Connor (Team Dimension Data) and Ilnur Zakarin (Team Katusha–Alpecin).

Riders believed to be the main contenders for victories on the sprint stages are the current German national champion Pascal Ackermann (Bora–Hansgrohe), Frenchman Arnaud Démare (Groupama–FDJ), Australian rider Caleb Ewan (Lotto–Soudal), Colombia's Fernando Gaviria (UAE Team Emirates), and the defending winner of the points classification, Italian Elia Viviani (Deceuninck–Quick-Step).

== Route and stages ==
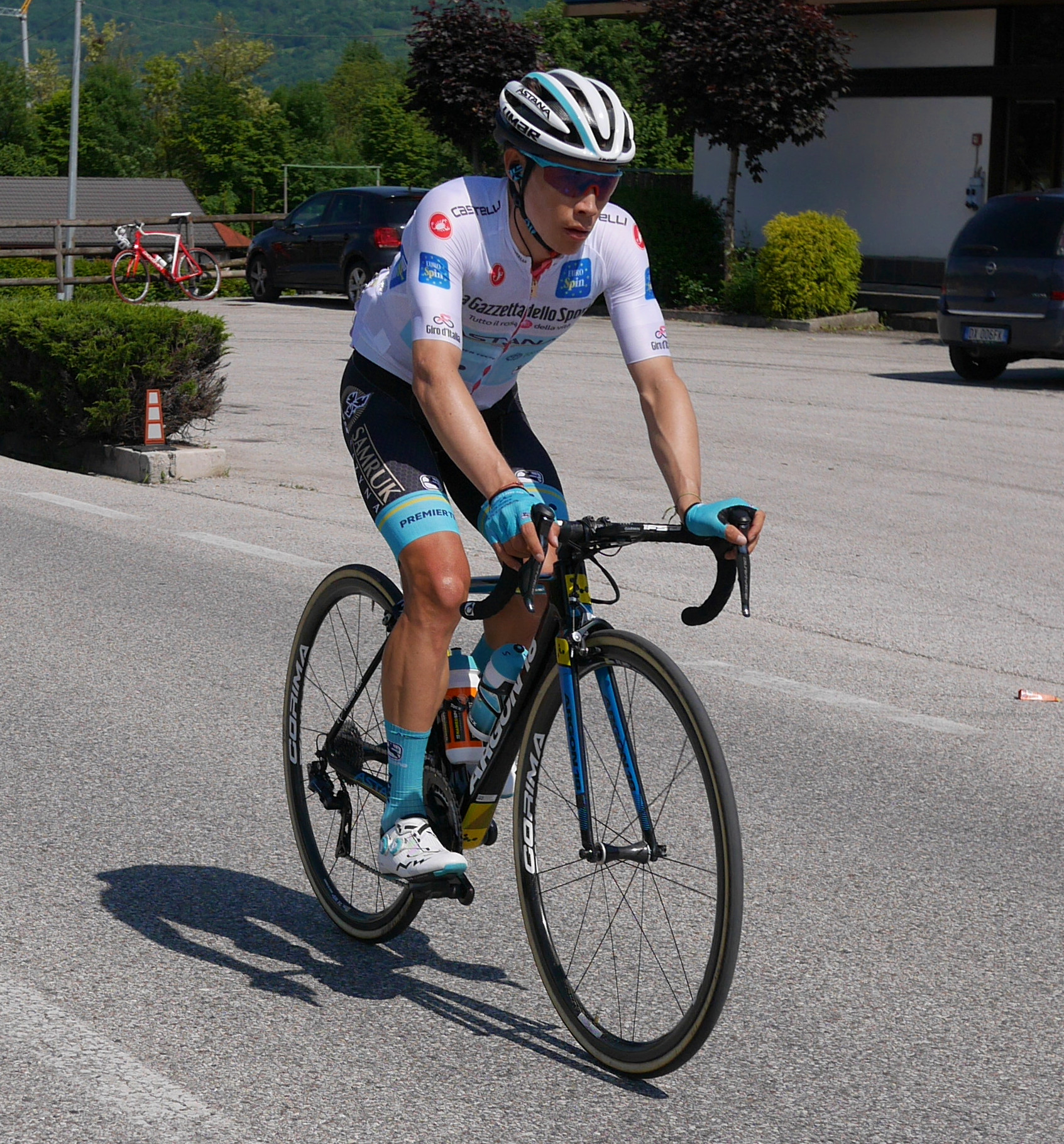
Miguel Ángel López (Astana) during stage 19, wearing the white jersey as the leader of the young rider classification

The race started on 11 May with an 8 km cronoscalata, a mountain time trial, in Bologna, which concluded with a 2.1 km (1 mi) climb to the Sanctuary of the Madonna di San Luca. The steep (average gradient 9.7%) climb, which is regularly used as a finish in the Italian autumn classic Giro dell'Emilia, made its debut in the Giro in 1956 in a time trial stage won by Charly Gaul, and had now made its fourth appearance in the Giro. The race then headed south, with the second stage crossing the Apennines into Tuscany, honouring Tuscan cyclist Gino Bartali with a stage finish in Fucecchio. The following stage started in Vinci, celebrating the 500th anniversary of the death of Leonardo da Vinci, and finished in Orbetello, which also acted as the start location for the following stage, in which the race left Tuscany for the Lazio region with a stage finish in Frascati. Continuing south, the peloton then left Frascati for a stage finish in Terracina, and, following a short transfer to Cassino, crossed the country on a hilly stage to the Apulian region on eastern coast, finishing in the town of San Giovanni Rotondo. The race then headed north, with stage finishes in L'Aquila and Pesaro. Stage nine's individual time trial in San Marino was the last stage before the rest day, and the only occasion where the Giro left Italy.

Following the first rest day, the riders tackled two flat stages with finishes in Modena and Novi Ligure. The twelfth stage, relatively short at 158 km (98 mi), started from Cuneo and included the climb of Montoso, 1248 meters above sea level. It finished with a very short, but steep climb in the town of Pinerolo, with the gradient reaching 20%. The thirteenth stage has been considered to become the first big test for the riders aiming for the general classification and included the race's first summit finish, at Lago Serrù, close to Ceresole Reale. Two other categorized climbs were included in the stage, namely the Colle del Lys and the Pian del Lupo.

Following the second, and last, rest day on 27 May, the riders faced what has been dubbed as the queen stage of the race, which started in Lovere, included several categorized climbs, including the Passo del Mortirolo, before finishing in Ponte di Legno. Initially, the stage was meant to also feature the Passo di Gavia, previously featured in 2014, in a stage won by Nairo Quintana (Movistar Team), who later won the overall classification, however the climb was ultimately removed from the route two days before the stage was run due to snow and poor weather conditions. The Mortirolo was first included in the race in 1990, and has since then made many appearances in the race, most recently on the 16th stage at the 2017 won by Vincenzo Nibali. The race finished with a 17 km (11 mi) time trial in Verona.

List of stages
Stage	Date	Course	Distance	Type	Winner
1	11 May	Bologna to Bologna (San Luca)	8 km (5 mi)	Individual time trial	Primož Roglič (SLO)
2	12 May	Bologna to Fucecchio	205 km (127 mi)	Hilly stage	Pascal Ackermann (GER)
3	13 May	Vinci to Orbetello	220 km (137 mi)	Flat stage	Fernando Gaviria (COL) (Note: Elia Viviani was originally listed as the stage winner. Viviani was later relegated by the race officials.)
4	14 May	Orbetello to Frascati	235 km (146 mi)	Flat stage	Richard Carapaz (ECU)
5	15 May	Frascati to Terracina	140 km (87 mi)	Flat stage	Pascal Ackermann (GER)
6	16 May	Cassino to San Giovanni Rotondo	238 km (148 mi)	Hilly stage	Fausto Masnada (ITA)
7	17 May	Vasto to L'Aquila	185 km (115 mi)	Hilly stage	Pello Bilbao (ESP)
8	18 May	Tortoreto Lido to Pesaro	239 km (149 mi)	Hilly stage	Caleb Ewan (AUS)
9	19 May	Riccione to City of San Marino (San Marino)	34.8 km (22 mi)	Individual time trial	Primož Roglič (SLO)
	20 May			Rest day	
10	21 May	Ravenna to Modena	145 km (90 mi)	Flat stage	Arnaud Démare (FRA)
11	22 May	Carpi to Novi Ligure	221 km (137 mi)	Flat stage	Caleb Ewan (AUS)
12	23 May	Cuneo to Pinerolo	158 km (98 mi)	Hilly stage	Cesare Benedetti (ITA)
13	24 May	Pinerolo to Ceresole Reale (Serrù Lake)	196 km (122 mi)	Mountain stage	Ilnur Zakarin (RUS)
14	25 May	Saint-Vincent to Courmayeur (Skyway Monte Bianco)	131 km (81 mi)	Mountain stage	Richard Carapaz (ECU)
15	26 May	Ivrea to Como	232 km (144 mi)	Intermediate stage	Dario Cataldo (ITA)
	27 May			Rest day	
16	28 May	Lovere to Ponte di Legno	~~226 km (140 mi)~~ 194 km (121 mi) (Note: Stage re-routed due to snow and poor weather conditions)	Mountain stage	Giulio Ciccone (ITA)
17	29 May	Commezzadura (Val di Sole) to Anterselva/Antholz	181 km (112 mi)	Intermediate stage	Nans Peters (FRA)
18	30 May	Valdaora/Olang to Santa Maria di Sala	222 km (138 mi)	Flat stage	Damiano Cima (ITA)
19	31 May	Treviso to San Martino di Castrozza	151 km (94 mi)	Mountain stage	Esteban Chaves (COL)
20	1 June	Feltre to Croce d'Aune-Monte Avena	194 km (121 mi)	Mountain stage	Pello Bilbao (ESP)
21	2 June	Verona to Verona	17 km (11 mi)	Individual time trial	Chad Haga (USA)
	Total		3,546.8 km (2,204 mi)		

== Race overview ==
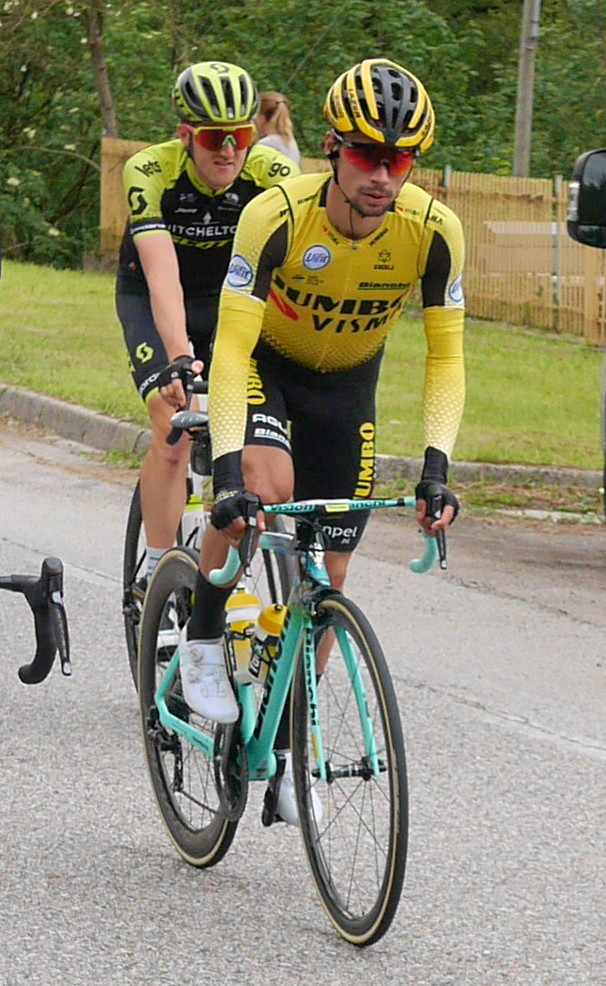
Primož Roglič (Team Jumbo–Visma, pictured on stage 18) became the first wearer of the pink jersey after winning the first stage.

The first stage, an 8 km mountain time trial in Bologna, was won by Primož Roglič (Team Jumbo–Visma) who therefore became the first wearer of the maglia rosa, the pink jersey identifying the leader of the general classification. Roglič also took the lead in the points classification. Giulio Ciccone (Trek–Segafredo) took the lead in the mountains classification and became the first wearer of the blue jersey, while Miguel Ángel López (Astana) finished as the fastest young rider and became the leader of the young rider classification. Stage 2, the first bunch sprint stage, was taken by Pascal Ackermann (Bora–Hansgrohe), who benefited from a mistake by Elia Viviani (Deceuninck–Quick-Step) in the setup for the sprint. Roglič held the maglia rosa for another day, while Ackermann took the points classification. Ciccone also went into the breakaway and maintained his lead in the mountains classification. The third stage was once again a group sprint, but this one had much more controversy. In the leadup to the sprint, Viviani pulled out of line and bumped Matteo Moschetti (Trek–Segafredo) out of the way. Viviani won the stage on the road, but judges later relegated him for an illegal sprint, which handed the win and points classification to Fernando Gaviria (UAE Team Emirates). No other changes in the jerseys occurred. Richard Carapaz (Movistar Team) won the fourth stage after a late attack. Multiple crashes with only a few kilometers left of the stage saw several riders go down. One of those affected was favorite Tom Dumoulin (Team Sunweb), who eventually finished the stage four minutes after many other favorites had crossed the line. Roglič extended his general classification lead out to 35 seconds, and Ackermann took back the points classification. Stage five was a drenched one, with a neutralized bunch sprint at the end. Ackermann took the win after nearly colliding with a Groupama–FDJ rider. Gaviria took a close second. Dumoulin officially withdrew after only a few kilometers of the stage, stating that the pain was too much to continue.

The first shakeup of the race occurred on stage six, where the breakaway took the stage. Fausto Masnada (Androni Giocattoli–Sidermec) beat Valerio Conti (UAE Team Emirates) to the line, beating the peloton by a full seven minutes. Conti was handed over the maglia rosa with the rest of the breakaway riders between him and Roglič because of this. Giovanni Carboni (Bardiani–CSF) gained the young rider classification also. Stage seven was another day for the breakaway, this time Pello Bilbao (Astana) fending off Tony Gallopin (AG2R La Mondiale) for the victory. Stage eight saw Caleb Ewan (Lotto–Soudal) take the sprint over Elia Viviani and Pascal Ackermann, the holder of the maglia ciclamino at the time. Stage nine, the San Marino time trial that would round out the first week, saw Primož Roglič victorious again, this time only 11 seconds over Victor Campenaerts (Lotto–Soudal) and a full minute over Bauke Mollema (Trek–Segafredo) and the rest of the GC favorites. Conti still held the maglia rosa.

A slight controversy opened up the second week, with stage ten ending in a reduced sprint caused by the fall of the maglia ciclamino holder Ackermann. Arnaud Démare (Groupama–FDJ) found victory over Viviani and Rüdiger Selig (Bora–Hansgrohe), who sprinted after Ackermann's crash. Ackermann would finish, although losing the ciclamino to Demare, and Matteo Moschetti would withdraw from injuries sustained in the incident. Ewan found victory once again in stage eleven, where he once again beat Demare and Ackermann. Ewan and Viviani both announced their withdrawals afterwards, in preparation for the Tour de France. Stage twelve followed the common roads of the Giro di Lombardia, where Cesare Benedetti (Bora–Hansgrohe) of the breakaway took his first pro win over Damiano Caruso (Bahrain–Merida) and Eddie Dunbar (Team INEOS). It also saw Jan Polanc (UAE Team Emirates) taking over the general classification from his teammate Conti. The thirteenth stage was the first true mountain stage of the Giro, and was potentially the turning point. Ilnur Zakarin (Team Katusha–Alpecin) took victory after an attack, in which he caught up and surpassed second placed Mikel Nieve (Mitchelton–Scott), with Mikel Landa (Movistar Team) coming in third. The surprise of the day was Richard Carapaz, who essentially was let go by Vincenzo Nibali (Bahrain–Merida) and Roglič. This placed him right with the other favorites, two down on Roglič and a further two on Polanc. However, on the other end of the spectrum, big names like Miguel Ángel López (Astana) and Simon Yates (Mitchelton–Scott) lose multiple minutes on the day. Stage fourteen was arguably the maglia rosa-deciding stage, as Carapaz was once again on the attack for minutes. The rest of the favorites once again let him go, and let his gap grow to nearly two minutes for a decisive victory. Yates placed in second, gaining about 20 seconds on the rest of the favorites. The fifteenth day of racing was one for the break again, as Dario Cataldo (Astana) edged out Mattia Cattaneo (Androni Giocattoli–Sidermec) for the win, with Yates once again placing on the podium. This stage saw Roglic lose a bit of time on his rivals after a nightmare day filled with crashes and such, obtaining a needed break from the final rest day.

The third week began with the now-shortened "queen stage" of the race. Missing out on the Gavia Pass, the challenging day saw the maglia azzurra (mountain classification) leader Giulio Ciccone (Trek–Segafredo) not only secure the classification, but win the stage from a tough breakaway with Jan Hirt (Astana) in a close second. Fausto Masnada (Androni Giocattoli–Sidermec) grabbed his second podium of the race in third, and saw Lopez lose some 20 seconds on Nibali, as well as Roglič over a minute. The seventeenth day was another one for the break, this time Nans Peters (AG2R La Mondiale) breaking through for the win, with Esteban Chaves (Mitchelton–Scott) around a minute and a half back, and Davide Formolo (Bora–Hansgrohe) rounded out in third. Nibali, Roglič, and others once again lost seconds on Carapaz. Stage eighteen, however, was more or less a break in the action for many. Damiano Cima (Nippo–Vini Fantini–Faizanè) outlasted the sprint trains to take a surprise win over Ackermann and Simone Consonni (UAE Team Emirates). Demare held the points classification up to this point, but bad positioning meant he brought it home in eighth, putting Ackermann in the maglia ciclamino to the end of the race. Stage nineteen was yet another for the break, this time Chaves finally nabbing a stage win for himself and Mitchelton–Scott. Andrea Vendrame (Androni Giocattoli–Sidermec) and Amaro Antunes (CCC Team) made up the top three, with Lopez gaining around 45 seconds on his rivals. The penultimate stage of the Giro was maybe one of the more exciting ones, with Pello Bilbao (Astana) taking another one for himself over Landa, with Ciccone not far behind in third. Roglič and Yates both lost 50 seconds to the favorites, and Lopez once again lost 2 minutes on them. That left everything on the table for the final time trial to round out this year's edition. The American Chad Haga (Team Sunweb) surprisingly gave Sunweb their one and only win in the Giro, with Campernaerts once again only four seconds down, and with Thomas De Gendt (Lotto–Soudal) taking the final place on the podium, rounding out an excellent Giro.

Carapaz became the first Ecuadorian rider to win a Grand Tour and the second South American rider to win the Giro, after Colombian Nairo Quintana in 2014. Vincenzo Nibali placed second, one minute down, and Roglič managed to take third back from Landa on the final day by eight seconds. Pascal Ackermann took the points classification by 13 points over Arnaud Démare, and Giulio Ciccone outright dominated the mountain classification. Miguel Ángel López unsurprisingly took the youth classification over Pavel Sivakov, and Movistar unsurprisingly took the team classification.

=== Incidents ===
About 60 km (37 mi) from the finish of stage 18, a spectator walked onto the road shortly before the escape group reached the spot and dropped a bicycle in the path of the riders. The man then walked away from the scene. Another spectator stepped in and removed the obstacle. On 4 June 2019, it was reported that the identified perpetrator, a man from Tunisia, faced expulsion back to his home country due to his actions.

During the final ascent to Croce d'Aune on stage 20, Miguel Ángel López was knocked off his bike in an incident with a spectator. Before he got back on his bike, López hit the fan several times in anger. He would go on to lose almost two minutes on the group of other favourites at the end of the stage. Even though UCI regulations stipulate that a rider who engages in physical violence is to be disqualified from the event, López was given no punishment for his action. The UCI announced on 2 June 2019 that they had launched an investigation into the jury's decision not to apply a penalty.

=== Doping ===
On 15 May 2019, the UCI announced that they had provisionally suspended Kristijan Koren (Bahrain–Merida), part of his squad for the 2019 Giro, for his alleged involvement in the Operation Aderlass doping case. The team subsequently pulled Koren out of the race.

== Classification leadership ==
In the Giro d'Italia, four different jerseys are awarded. The first and most important is the general classification, calculated by adding each rider's finishing times on each stage. Riders receive time bonuses (10, 6 and 4 seconds respectively) for finishing in the first three places on each stage. Smaller time bonuses are also given to the top three riders at the last intermediate sprint on each stage (3, 2 and 1 seconds respectively). The rider with the lowest cumulative time is awarded the pink jersey (Italian: maglia rosa), and is considered the winner of the Giro d'Italia.

Points for the points classification
Position		1	2	3	4	5	6	7	8	9	10	11	12	13	14	15
Flat stages	Finish	50	35	25	18	14	12	10	8	7	6	5	4	3	2	1
Flat stages	Intermediate Sprint	12	8	6	5	4	3	2	1	0						
Hilly stages	Finish	25	18	12	8	6	5	4	3	2	1	0				
Hilly stages	Intermediate Sprint	12	8	6	5	4	3	2	1	0						
Other stages	Finish	15	12	9	7	6	5	4	3	2	1	0				
Other stages	Intermediate Sprint	12	8	6	5	4	3	2	1	0						

Additionally, there is a points classification. Riders win points for finishing in the top placings on each stage or by being within the first cyclists to reach intermediate sprint locations along each mass-start stage. Flat stages award more points than mountainous stages, meaning that this classification tends to favour sprinters. The leader of the points classification wore the cyclamen jersey.

Points for the mountains classification
Position	1	2	3	4	5	6	7	8	9
Points for Cima Coppi	50	30	20	14	10	6	4	2	1
Points for Category 1	40	18	12	9	6	4	2	1	0
Points for Category 2	18	8	6	4	2	1	0		
Points for Category 3	9	4	2	1	0				
Points for Category 4	3	2	1	0					

There is also a mountains classification, for which points were awarded for reaching the top of a climb before other riders. Each climb was categorised as either first, second, third or fourth-category, with more points available for the more difficult, higher-categorised climbs. For first-category climbs, the top eight riders earned points; on second-category climbs, six riders won points; on third-category climbs, only the top four riders earned points with three on fourth-category climbs. The leadership of the mountains classification was marked by a blue jersey. The Cima Coppi, the race's highest point of elevation, awards more points than the other first-category climbs, with nine riders scoring points. Initially, the Cima Coppi was scheduled to be the Passo di Gavia on the sixteenth stage, but due to weather the climb was removed from the itinerary. The next highest climb was that to Serrù Lake, however the climb had already been ascended prior to the cancellation. As a result, organisers chose to assign the Cima Coppi to the highest climb out of those which had not been ascended – the Passo Manghen on stage 20.

The fourth jersey represents the young rider classification. This is decided the same way as the general classification, but only riders born after 1 January 1994 are eligible. The winner of the classification is awarded a white jersey. There are also two classifications for teams. In the Trofeo Fast Team classification, the times of the best three cyclists per team on each stage are added up; the leading team is one with the lowest total time. The Trofeo Super Team is a team points classification, with the top 20 riders of each stage earning points for their team.

The first additional award is the intermediate sprint classification. Each road stage has two sprints – the Traguardi Volanti. The first 5 riders across the intermediate sprint lines are awarded points (10, 6, 3, 2 and 1 points respectively); the rider with the most points at the end of the race wins the classification. Another classification – the combativity prize (Italian: Premio Combattività) – involves points awarded to the first riders at the stage finishes, at intermediate sprints, and at the summits of categorised climbs. There is also a breakaway award (Italian: Premio della Fuga). For this, points are awarded to each rider in any breakaway smaller than 10 riders that escapes for at least 5 kilometres (3.1 mi). Each rider is awarded a point for each kilometre that the rider was away from the peloton. The rider with the most points at the end of the Giro wins the award. The final classification is a "fair play" ranking for each team. Teams are given penalty points for infringing various rules. These range from half-point penalties, for offences that merit warnings from race officials, to a 2000-point penalty, for a positive doping test. The team that has the lowest points total at the end of the Giro wins the classification. When several teams are tied on points, the team with the highest classified rider in the general classification will be the higher ranked team in the fair play classification.

Classification leadership by stage
Stage	Winner	General classification	Points classification	Mountains classification	Young rider classification	General Super Team	Intermediate sprint classification	Combativity classification	Breakaway classification	Fair play classification
1	Primož Roglič	Primož Roglič	Primož Roglič (Note: In stage 2, Simon Yates, who was second in the points classification, wore the cyclamen jersey, because Primož Roglič (in first place) wore the pink jersey as leader of the general classification during that stage.)	Giulio Ciccone	Miguel Ángel López	Team Jumbo–Visma	not awarded	Primož Roglič	not awarded	Team Jumbo–Visma
2	Pascal Ackermann	Primož Roglič	Pascal Ackermann	Giulio Ciccone	Miguel Ángel López	Team Jumbo–Visma	Damiano Cima	Damiano Cima	Łukasz Owsian	Team Jumbo–Visma
3	Fernando Gaviria	Primož Roglič	Fernando Gaviria	Giulio Ciccone	Miguel Ángel López	Team Jumbo–Visma	Arnaud Démare	Arnaud Démare	Łukasz Owsian	Mitchelton–Scott
4	Richard Carapaz	Primož Roglič	Pascal Ackermann	Giulio Ciccone	Miguel Ángel López	Bora–Hansgrohe	Damiano Cima	Damiano Cima	Marco Frapporti	Mitchelton–Scott
5	Pascal Ackermann	Primož Roglič	Pascal Ackermann	Giulio Ciccone	Miguel Ángel López	Bora–Hansgrohe	Damiano Cima	Pascal Ackermann	Marco Frapporti	Mitchelton–Scott
6	Fausto Masnada	Valerio Conti	Pascal Ackermann	Giulio Ciccone	Giovanni Carboni	Movistar Team	Damiano Cima	Pascal Ackermann	Marco Frapporti	UAE Team Emirates
7	Pello Bilbao	Valerio Conti	Pascal Ackermann	Giulio Ciccone	Giovanni Carboni	Movistar Team	Damiano Cima	Pascal Ackermann	Marco Frapporti	UAE Team Emirates
8	Caleb Ewan	Valerio Conti	Pascal Ackermann	Giulio Ciccone	Giovanni Carboni	Movistar Team	Damiano Cima	Pascal Ackermann	Marco Frapporti	UAE Team Emirates
9	Primož Roglič	Valerio Conti	Pascal Ackermann	Giulio Ciccone	Nans Peters	Movistar Team	Damiano Cima	Pascal Ackermann	Marco Frapporti	UAE Team Emirates
10	Arnaud Démare	Valerio Conti	Pascal Ackermann	Giulio Ciccone	Nans Peters	Movistar Team	Damiano Cima	Arnaud Démare	Marco Frapporti	UAE Team Emirates
11	Caleb Ewan	Valerio Conti	Arnaud Démare	Giulio Ciccone	Nans Peters	Movistar Team	Damiano Cima	Arnaud Démare	Marco Frapporti	UAE Team Emirates
12	Cesare Benedetti	Jan Polanc	Arnaud Démare	Gianluca Brambilla	Hugh Carthy	Androni Giocattoli–Sidermec	Damiano Cima	Arnaud Démare	Marco Frapporti	UAE Team Emirates
13	Ilnur Zakarin	Jan Polanc	Arnaud Démare	Giulio Ciccone	Pavel Sivakov	Movistar Team	Damiano Cima	Arnaud Démare	Marco Frapporti	UAE Team Emirates
14	Richard Carapaz	Richard Carapaz	Arnaud Démare	Giulio Ciccone	Pavel Sivakov	Movistar Team	Damiano Cima	Arnaud Démare	Marco Frapporti	Movistar Team
15	Dario Cataldo	Richard Carapaz	Arnaud Démare	Giulio Ciccone	Pavel Sivakov	Movistar Team	Damiano Cima	Arnaud Démare	Marco Frapporti	Bahrain–Merida
16	Giulio Ciccone	Richard Carapaz	Arnaud Démare	Giulio Ciccone	Miguel Ángel López	Movistar Team	Damiano Cima	Fausto Masnada	Marco Frapporti	Bahrain–Merida
17	Nans Peters	Richard Carapaz	Arnaud Démare	Giulio Ciccone	Miguel Ángel López	Movistar Team	Fausto Masnada	Fausto Masnada	Marco Frapporti	Bahrain–Merida
18	Damiano Cima	Richard Carapaz	Pascal Ackermann	Giulio Ciccone	Miguel Ángel López	Movistar Team	Damiano Cima	Fausto Masnada	Damiano Cima	Bahrain–Merida
19	Esteban Chaves	Richard Carapaz	Pascal Ackermann	Giulio Ciccone	Miguel Ángel López	Movistar Team	Damiano Cima	Fausto Masnada	Damiano Cima	Bahrain–Merida
20	Pello Bilbao	Richard Carapaz	Pascal Ackermann	Giulio Ciccone	Miguel Ángel López	Movistar Team	Fausto Masnada	Fausto Masnada	Damiano Cima	Bahrain–Merida
21	Chad Haga	Richard Carapaz	Pascal Ackermann	Giulio Ciccone	Miguel Ángel López	Movistar Team	Fausto Masnada	Fausto Masnada	Damiano Cima	Bahrain–Merida
Final		Richard Carapaz	Pascal Ackermann	Giulio Ciccone	Miguel Ángel López	Movistar Team	Fausto Masnada	Fausto Masnada	Damiano Cima	Bahrain–Merida

== Final standings ==
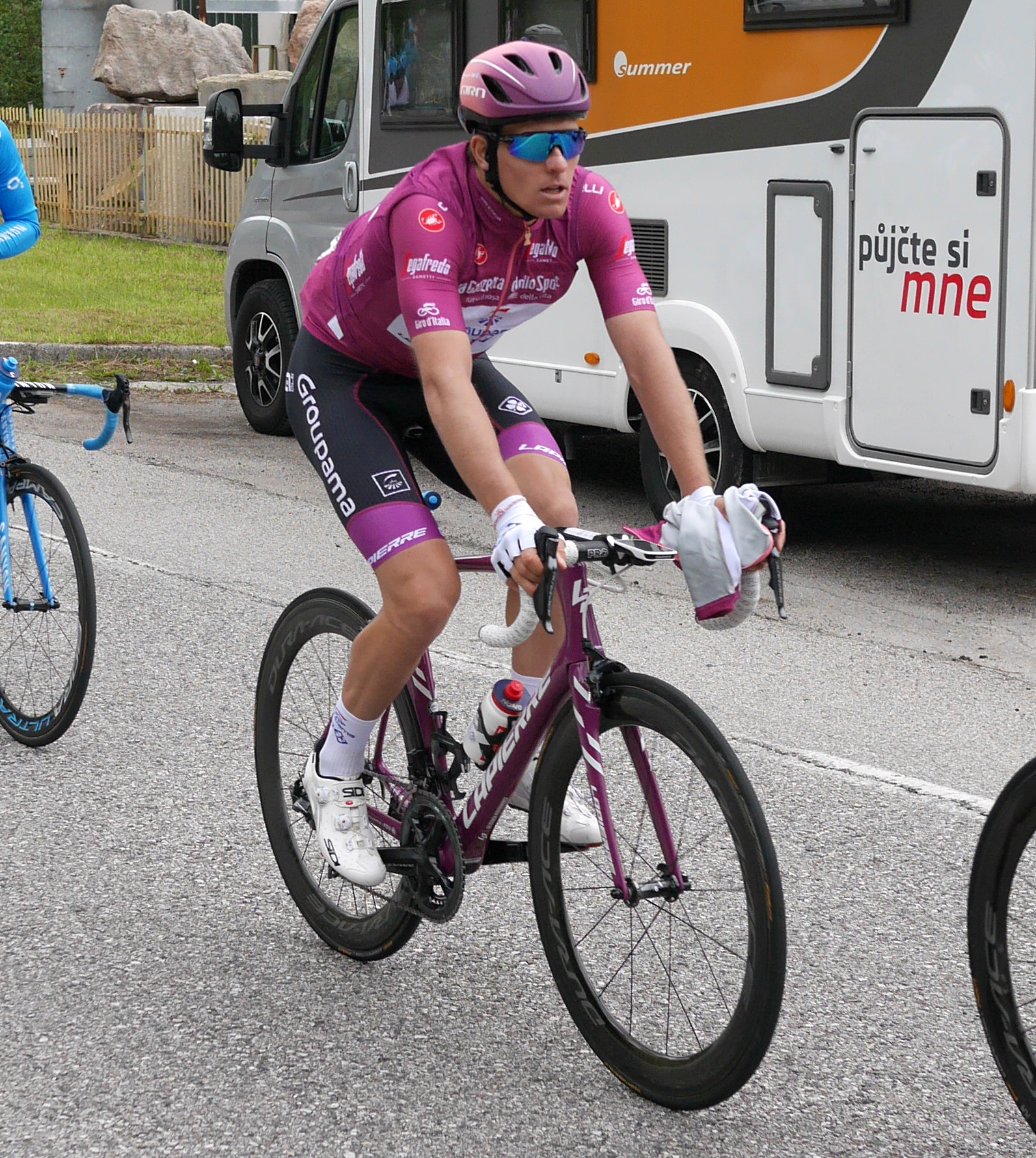
Arnaud Démare (Groupama–FDJ) (pictured during stage 18) wore the cyclamen jersey as points leader for seven stages and eventually finished in second position.

Legend
General classification	Denotes the leader of the general classification	Mountains classification	Denotes the leader of the mountains classification
Points classification	Denotes the leader of the points classification	Young rider classification	Denotes the leader of the young rider classification

=== General classification ===
Final general classification (1–10)
Rank	Rider	Team	Time
1	Richard Carapaz (ECU)	Movistar Team	90h 01' 47"
2	Vincenzo Nibali (ITA)	Bahrain–Merida	+ 1' 05"
3	Primož Roglič (SLO)	Team Jumbo–Visma	+ 2' 30"
4	Mikel Landa (ESP)	Movistar Team	+ 2' 38"
5	Bauke Mollema (NED)	Trek–Segafredo	+ 5' 43"
6	Rafał Majka (POL)	Bora–Hansgrohe	+ 6' 56"
7	Miguel Ángel López (COL)	Astana	+ 7' 26"
8	Simon Yates (GBR)	Mitchelton–Scott	+ 7' 49"
9	Pavel Sivakov (RUS)	Team INEOS	+ 8' 56"
10	Ilnur Zakarin (RUS)	Team Katusha–Alpecin	+ 12' 14"

Final general classification (11–142)
Rank	Rider	Team	Time
11	Hugh Carthy (GBR)	EF Education First	+ 16' 36"
12	Joe Dombrowski (USA)	EF Education First	+ 20' 12"
13	Valentin Madouas (FRA)	Groupama–FDJ	+ 21' 59"
14	Jan Polanc (SLO)	UAE Team Emirates	+ 22' 38"
15	Davide Formolo (ITA)	Bora–Hansgrohe	+ 22' 38"
16	Giulio Ciccone (ITA)	Trek–Segafredo	+ 27' 19"
17	Mikel Nieve (ESP)	Mitchelton–Scott	+ 27' 46"
18	Tanel Kangert (EST)	EF Education First	+ 30' 11"
19	Domenico Pozzovivo (ITA)	Bahrain–Merida	+ 33' 40"
20	Fausto Masnada (ITA)	Androni Giocattoli–Sidermec	+ 34' 52"
21	Víctor de la Parte (ESP)	CCC Team	+ 39' 51"
22	Eddie Dunbar (IRL)	Team INEOS	+ 42' 26"
23	Damiano Caruso (ITA)	Bahrain–Merida	+ 49' 06"
24	Sebastián Henao (COL)	Team INEOS	+ 58' 45"
25	Lucas Hamilton (AUS)	Mitchelton–Scott	+ 1h 04' 31"
26	Andrey Zeits (KAZ)	Astana	+ 1h 05' 28"
27	Jan Hirt (CZE)	Astana	+ 1h 05' 38"
28	Mattia Cattaneo (ITA)	Androni Giocattoli–Sidermec	+ 1h 09' 11"
29	Alexis Vuillermoz (FRA)	AG2R La Mondiale	+ 1h 12' 04"
30	François Bidard (FRA)	AG2R La Mondiale	+ 1h 16' 55"
31	Pello Bilbao (ESP)	Astana	+ 1h 17' 41"
32	Ben O'Connor (AUS)	Team Dimension Data	+ 1h 17' 49"
33	Bob Jungels (LUX)	Deceuninck–Quick-Step	+ 1h 22' 57"
34	Chris Hamilton (AUS)	Team Sunweb	+ 1h 24' 02"
35	Jai Hindley (AUS)	Team Sunweb	+ 1h 28' 09"
36	Ion Izagirre (ESP)	Astana	+ 1h 28' 25"
37	Eros Capecchi (ITA)	Deceuninck–Quick-Step	+ 1h 32' 21"
38	Pieter Serry (BEL)	Deceuninck–Quick-Step	+ 1h 32' 54"
39	Andrey Amador (CRC)	Movistar Team	+ 1h 33' 00"
40	Esteban Chaves (COL)	Mitchelton–Scott	+ 1h 33' 12"
41	Koen Bouwman (NED)	Team Jumbo–Visma	+ 1h 36' 40"
42	Diego Ulissi (ITA)	UAE Team Emirates	+ 1h 38' 34"
43	Jan Bakelants (BEL)	Team Sunweb	+ 1h 49' 34"
44	Iván Ramiro Sosa (COL)	Team INEOS	+ 1h 54' 16"
45	Amanuel Ghebreigzabhier (ERI)	Team Dimension Data	+ 1h 54' 33"
46	Antonio Pedrero (ESP)	Movistar Team	+ 1h 56' 03"
47	Hubert Dupont (FRA)	AG2R La Mondiale	+ 1h 56' 44"
48	Dario Cataldo (ITA)	Astana	+ 1h 57' 41"
49	Gianluca Brambilla (ITA)	Trek–Segafredo	+ 1h 59' 02"
50	José Joaquín Rojas (ESP)	Movistar Team	+ 2h 03' 31"
51	Thomas De Gendt (BEL)	Lotto–Soudal	+ 2h 06' 26"
52	Larry Warbasse (USA)	AG2R La Mondiale	+ 2h 07' 02"
53	Matteo Montaguti (ITA)	Androni Giocattoli–Sidermec	+ 2h 07' 24"
54	Amaro Antunes (POR)	CCC Team	+ 2h 09' 51"
55	Andrea Vendrame (ITA)	Androni Giocattoli–Sidermec	+ 2h 12' 22"
56	Sepp Kuss (USA)	Team Jumbo–Visma	+ 2h 15' 24"
57	Giovanni Carboni (ITA)	Bardiani–CSF	+ 2h 18' 35"
58	Manuel Senni (ITA)	Bardiani–CSF	+ 2h 20' 43"
59	Francesco Gavazzi (ITA)	Androni Giocattoli–Sidermec	+ 2h 24' 42"
60	Davide Villella (ITA)	Astana	+ 2h 27' 26"
61	Nans Peters (FRA)	AG2R La Mondiale	+ 2h 31' 42"
62	Jay McCarthy (AUS)	Bora–Hansgrohe	+ 2h 40' 04"
63	Nicola Conci (ITA)	Trek–Segafredo	+ 2h 41' 00"
64	Tosh Van der Sande (BEL)	Lotto–Soudal	+ 2h 41' 58"
65	Antwan Tolhoek (NED)	Team Jumbo–Visma	+ 2h 43' 16"
66	Enrico Battaglin (ITA)	Team Katusha–Alpecin	+ 2h 44' 14"
67	Nathan Brown (USA)	EF Education First	+ 2h 44' 52"
68	Adam Hansen (AUS)	Lotto–Soudal	+ 2h 46' 43"
69	Enrico Gasparotto (ITA)	Team Dimension Data	+ 2h 50' 28"
70	Christopher Juul-Jensen (DEN)	Mitchelton–Scott	+ 2h 50' 33"
71	Rubén Plaza (ESP)	Israel Cycling Academy	+ 2h 55' 14"
72	Miguel Eduardo Flórez (COL)	Androni Giocattoli–Sidermec	+ 2h 57' 12"
73	Łukasz Owsian (POL)	CCC Team	+ 3h 00' 02"
74	Cesare Benedetti (ITA)	Bora–Hansgrohe	+ 3h 03' 12"
75	Paul Martens (GER)	Team Jumbo–Visma	+ 3h 03' 30"
76	Antonio Nibali (ITA)	Bahrain–Merida	+ 3h 04' 26"
77	Kristian Sbaragli (ITA)	Israel Cycling Academy	+ 3h 06' 36"
78	Luke Durbridge (AUS)	Mitchelton–Scott	+ 3h 09' 24"
79	Ben Gastauer (LUX)	AG2R La Mondiale	+ 3h 09' 32"
80	Jhonatan Narváez (ECU)	Team INEOS	+ 3h 10' 04"
81	Marco Frapporti (ITA)	Androni Giocattoli–Sidermec	+ 3h 14' 04"
82	Tobias Ludvigsson (SWE)	Groupama–FDJ	+ 3h 15' 57"
83	Danilo Wyss (SUI)	Team Dimension Data	+ 3h 18' 24"
84	Luca Covili (ITA)	Bardiani–CSF	+ 3h 20' 58"
85	Lorenzo Rota (ITA)	Bardiani–CSF	+ 3h 25' 08"
86	Salvatore Puccio (ITA)	Team INEOS	+ 3h 25' 43"
87	Francisco José Ventoso (ESP)	CCC Team	+ 3h 28' 10"
88	Héctor Carretero (ESP)	Movistar Team	+ 3h 33' 45"
89	Paweł Poljański (POL)	Bora–Hansgrohe	+ 3h 35' 14"
90	Manuele Boaro (ITA)	Astana	+ 3h 35' 32"
91	Ryan Gibbons (SAF)	Team Dimension Data	+ 3h 39' 32"
92	Fabio Sabatini (ITA)	Deceuninck–Quick-Step	+ 3h 43' 50"
93	Valerio Agnoli (ITA)	Bahrain–Merida	+ 3h 52' 52"
94	Reto Hollenstein (SUI)	Team Katusha–Alpecin	+ 3h 53' 05"
95	Jack Bauer (NZL)	Mitchelton–Scott	+ 3h 53' 06"
96	Christian Knees (GER)	Team INEOS	+ 3h 54' 54"
97	Michael Gogl (AUT)	Trek–Segafredo	+ 3h 58' 26"
98	Andrea Garosio (ITA)	Bahrain–Merida	+ 4h 00' 28"
99	Marco Marcato (ITA)	UAE Team Emirates	+ 4h 06' 17"
100	Krists Neilands (LAT)	Israel Cycling Academy	+ 4h 06' 28"
101	Mikkel Frølich Honoré (DEN)	Deceuninck–Quick-Step	+ 4h 07' 49"
102	Ivan Santaromita (ITA)	Nippo–Vini Fantini–Faizanè	+ 4h 08' 19"
103	Mirco Maestri (ITA)	Bardiani–CSF	+ 4h 11' 52"
104	Jos van Emden (NED)	Team Jumbo–Visma	+ 4h 13' 34"
105	Chad Haga (USA)	Team Sunweb	+ 4h 13' 46"
106	Sean Bennett (USA)	EF Education First	+ 4h 17' 00"
107	Marco Canola (ITA)	Nippo–Vini Fantini–Faizanè	+ 4h 18' 19"
108	Jonathan Kléver Caicedo (ECU)	EF Education First	+ 4h 18' 35"
109	Manuel Belletti (ITA)	Androni Giocattoli–Sidermec	+ 4h 20' 44"
110	Grega Bole (SLO)	Bahrain–Merida	+ 4h 22' 27"
111	Victor Campenaerts (BEL)	Lotto–Soudal	+ 4h 25' 03"
112	Olivier Le Gac (FRA)	Groupama–FDJ	+ 4h 27' 17"
113	Guy Niv (ISR)	Israel Cycling Academy	+ 4h 29' 11"
114	Michael Schwarzmann (GER)	Bora–Hansgrohe	+ 4h 29' 32"
115	Josef Černý (CZE)	CCC Team	+ 4h 31' 48"
116	Marco Haller (AUT)	Team Katusha–Alpecin	+ 4h 31' 59"
117	Jenthe Biermans (BEL)	Team Katusha–Alpecin	+ 4h 35' 35"
118	Scott Davies (GBR)	Team Dimension Data	+ 4h 44' 40"
119	Tom Leezer (NED)	Team Jumbo–Visma	+ 4h 51' 26"
120	Jasha Sütterlin (GER)	Movistar Team	+ 4h 53' 09"
121	Dmitry Strakhov (RUS)	Team Katusha–Alpecin	+ 4h 56' 00"
122	Pascal Ackermann (GER)	Bora–Hansgrohe	+ 4h 56' 45"
123	Arnaud Démare (FRA)	Groupama–FDJ	+ 4h 56' 59"
124	Nico Denz (GER)	AG2R La Mondiale	+ 4h 58' 12"
125	Guillaume Boivin (CAN)	Israel Cycling Academy	+ 4h 58' 58"
126	Lluís Mas (ESP)	Movistar Team	+ 5h 00' 44"
127	Rüdiger Selig (GER)	Bora–Hansgrohe	+ 5h 02' 30"
128	Awet Gebremedhin (SWE)	Israel Cycling Academy	+ 5h 06' 26"
129	Kamil Gradek (POL)	CCC Team	+ 5h 07' 15"
130	Davide Cimolai (ITA)	Israel Cycling Academy	+ 5h 08' 52"
131	Simone Consonni (ITA)	UAE Team Emirates	+ 5h 09' 31"
132	Jacopo Guarnieri (ITA)	Groupama–FDJ	+ 5h 16' 07"
133	Ramon Sinkeldam (NED)	Groupama–FDJ	+ 5h 21' 10"
134	Juan José Lobato (ESP)	Nippo–Vini Fantini–Faizanè	+ 5h 26' 51"
135	Conor Dunne (IRL)	Israel Cycling Academy	+ 5h 26' 52"
136	Markel Irizar (ESP)	Trek–Segafredo	+ 5h 28' 23"
137	Damiano Cima (ITA)	Nippo–Vini Fantini–Faizanè	+ 5h 29' 19"
138	Miles Scotson (AUS)	Groupama–FDJ	+ 5h 33' 49"
139	Tom Bohli (SUI)	UAE Team Emirates	+ 5h 34' 50"
140	Paolo Simion (ITA)	Bardiani–CSF	+ 5h 35' 22"
141	Will Clarke (AUS)	Trek–Segafredo	+ 6h 00' 17"
142	Sho Hatsuyama (JPN)	Nippo–Vini Fantini–Faizanè	+ 6h 05' 56"

=== Points classification ===
Final points classification (1–10)
Rank	Rider	Team	Points
1	Pascal Ackermann (GER)	Bora–Hansgrohe	226
2	Arnaud Démare (FRA)	Groupama–FDJ	213
3	Damiano Cima (ITA)	Nippo–Vini Fantini–Faizanè	104
4	Fausto Masnada (ITA)	Androni Giocattoli–Sidermec	93
5	Richard Carapaz (ECU)	Movistar Team	90
6	Davide Cimolai (ITA)	Israel Cycling Academy	60
7	Mirco Maestri (ITA)	Bardiani–CSF	54
8	Vincenzo Nibali (ITA)	Bahrain–Merida	51
9	Primož Roglič (SLO)	Team Jumbo–Visma	50
10	Pello Bilbao (ESP)	Astana	48

=== Mountains classification ===
Final mountains classification (1–10)
Rank	Rider	Team	Points
1	Giulio Ciccone (ITA)	Trek–Segafredo	267
2	Fausto Masnada (ITA)	Androni Giocattoli–Sidermec	115
3	Damiano Caruso (ITA)	Bahrain–Merida	86
4	Richard Carapaz (ECU)	Movistar Team	75
5	Mikel Nieve (ESP)	Mitchelton–Scott	68
6	Ilnur Zakarin (RUS)	Team Katusha–Alpecin	54
7	Mattia Cattaneo (ITA)	Androni Giocattoli–Sidermec	53
8	Pello Bilbao (ESP)	Astana	46
9	Mikel Landa (ESP)	Movistar Team	42
10	Gianluca Brambilla (ITA)	Trek–Segafredo	40

=== Young rider classification ===
Final young rider classification (1–10)
Rank	Rider	Team	Time
1	Miguel Ángel López (COL)	Astana	90h 09' 13"
2	Pavel Sivakov (RUS)	Team INEOS	+ 1' 30"
3	Hugh Carthy (GBR)	EF Education First	+ 9' 10"
4	Valentin Madouas (FRA)	Groupama–FDJ	+ 14' 33"
5	Giulio Ciccone (ITA)	Trek–Segafredo	+ 19' 53"
6	Eddie Dunbar (IRL)	Team INEOS	+ 35' 00"
7	Lucas Hamilton (AUS)	Mitchelton–Scott	+ 57' 05"
8	Ben O'Connor (AUS)	Team Dimension Data	+ 1h 10' 23"
9	Chris Hamilton (AUS)	Team Sunweb	+ 1h 16' 36"
10	Jai Hindley (AUS)	Team Sunweb	+ 1h 20' 43"

=== General Super Team ===
General Super Team classification (1–10)
Rank	Team	Time
1	(Spain) Movistar Team	270h 44' 14"
2	(Kazakhstan) Astana	+ 17' 36"
3	Bahrain–Merida	+ 18' 31"
4	(United States) EF Education First	+ 25' 35"
5	(Australia) Mitchelton–Scott	+ 30' 56"
6	(United Kingdom) Team INEOS	+ 37' 36"
7	(United States) Trek–Segafredo	+ 1h 11' 03"
8	(Germany) Bora–Hansgrohe	+ 1h 37' 39"
9	(Italy) Androni Giocattoli–Sidermec	+ 1h 41' 39"
10	(Netherlands) Team Jumbo–Visma	+ 2h 07' 26"

=== Intermediate sprint classification ===
Intermediate sprint classification (1-10)
Rank	Rider	Team	Points
1	Fausto Masnada (ITA)	Androni Giocattoli–Sidermec	88
2	Damiano Cima (ITA)	Nippo–Vini Fantini–Faizanè	83
3	Mirco Maestri (ITA)	Bardiani–CSF	58
4	Marco Frapporti (ITA)	Androni Giocattoli–Sidermec	50
5	José Joaquín Rojas (ESP)	Movistar Team	31
6	Arnaud Démare (FRA)	Groupama–FDJ	31
7	Mattia Cattaneo (ITA)	Androni Giocattoli–Sidermec	28
8	Sho Hatsuyama (JPN)	Nippo–Vini Fantini–Faizanè	26
9	Jan Bakelants (BEL)	Team Sunweb	22
10	Dario Cataldo (ITA)	Astana	21

=== Combativity classification ===
Combativity classification (1-10)
Rank	Rider	Team	Points
1	Fausto Masnada (ITA)	Androni Giocattoli–Sidermec	74
2	Damiano Cima (ITA)	Nippo–Vini Fantini–Faizanè	58
3	Giulio Ciccone (ITA)	Trek–Segafredo	57
4	Arnaud Démare (FRA)	Groupama–FDJ	47
5	Pascal Ackermann (GER)	Bora–Hansgrohe	43
6	Mirco Maestri (ITA)	Bardiani–CSF	36
7	Marco Frapporti (ITA)	Androni Giocattoli–Sidermec	35
8	Mattia Cattaneo (ITA)	Androni Giocattoli–Sidermec	34
9	Richard Carapaz (ECU)	Movistar Team	30
10	Dario Cataldo (ITA)	Astana	27

=== Breakaway classification ===
Breakaway classification (1-10)
Rank	Rider	Team	Points
1	Damiano Cima (ITA)	Nippo–Vini Fantini–Faizanè	932
2	Marco Frapporti (ITA)	Androni Giocattoli–Sidermec	816
3	Mirco Maestri (ITA)	Bardiani–CSF	742
4	Giulio Ciccone (ITA)	Trek–Segafredo	367
5	Mattia Cattaneo (ITA)	Androni Giocattoli–Sidermec	306
6	Sho Hatsuyama (JPN)	Nippo–Vini Fantini–Faizanè	259
7	Dario Cataldo (ITA)	Astana	246
8	François Bidard (FRA)	AG2R La Mondiale	219
9	Łukasz Owsian (POL)	CCC Team	195
10	Sean Bennett (USA)	EF Education First	180
