= Damiano Cima =

Italian cyclist (born 1993)

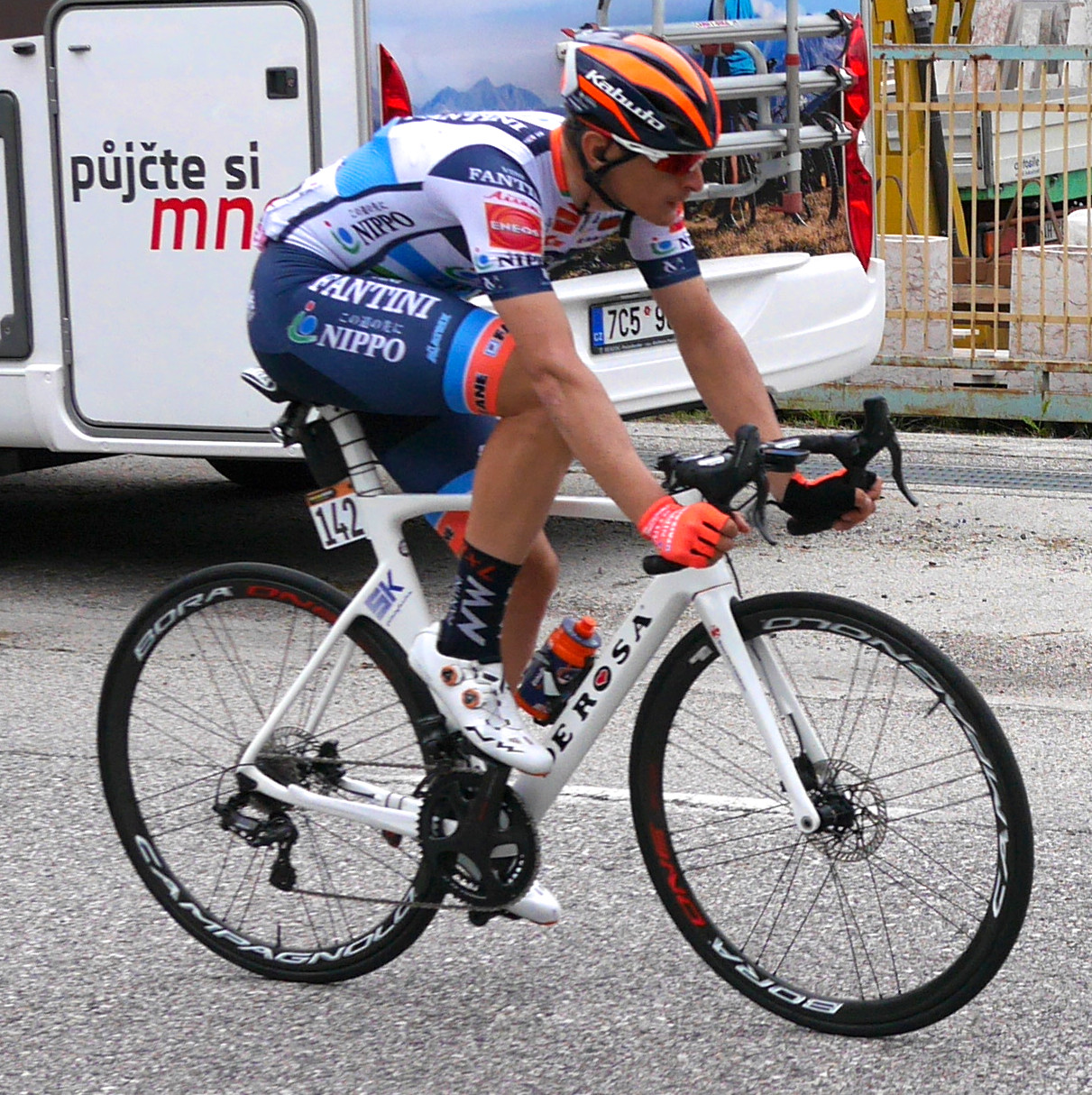
- Cima at the 2019 Giro d'Italia

Personal information
- Full name: Damiano Cima
- Born: 13 September 1993 (age 33) Brescia, Italy

Cycling career
- Sport: Cycling
- Current team: Gazprom–RusVelo
- Discipline: Road
- Role: Rider

Amateur teams
- 2012: Simaf Carrier Wega Truck Italia Valdarno
- 2013: Food Italia Mg K Vis Norda
- 2014–2015: Team Colpack
- 2016–2017: Viris Maserati–Sisal Matchpoint

Professional teams
- 2017: Nippo–Vini Fantini (stagiaire)
- 2018–2019: Nippo–Vini Fantini–Europa Ovini
- 2020–2021: Gazprom–RusVelo

Major wins
- Grand Tours Giro d'Italia 1 individual stage (2019)

Damiano Cima (born 13 September 1993 in Brescia) is an Italian cyclist, who currently rides for UCI ProTeam Gazprom–RusVelo. His younger brother Imerio Cima is also a cyclist, and is also part of the Gazprom–RusVelo squad. In May 2019, he was named in the startlist for the 2019 Giro d'Italia, and won stage 18 of the race.

== Major results ==
2014
1st Coppa Collecchio
3rd Trofeo Edil C
2015
7th GP Laguna
2016
1st Gran Premio Industrie del Marmo
2017
2nd La Popolarissima
2018
1st Overall Tour of Xingtai

1st Points classification
1st Stage 1

2nd Overall Tour of China I

1st Stage 6

2019
1st Stage 18 Giro d'Italia
5th Coppa Bernocchi
2021
3rd Overall Okolo Jižních Čech

1st Stage 4

10th Clásica de Almería

=== Grand Tour general classification results timeline ===
Grand Tour	2019
Giro d'Italia	137
Tour de France	—
Vuelta a España	—
