= Mirco Maestri =

Italian cyclist

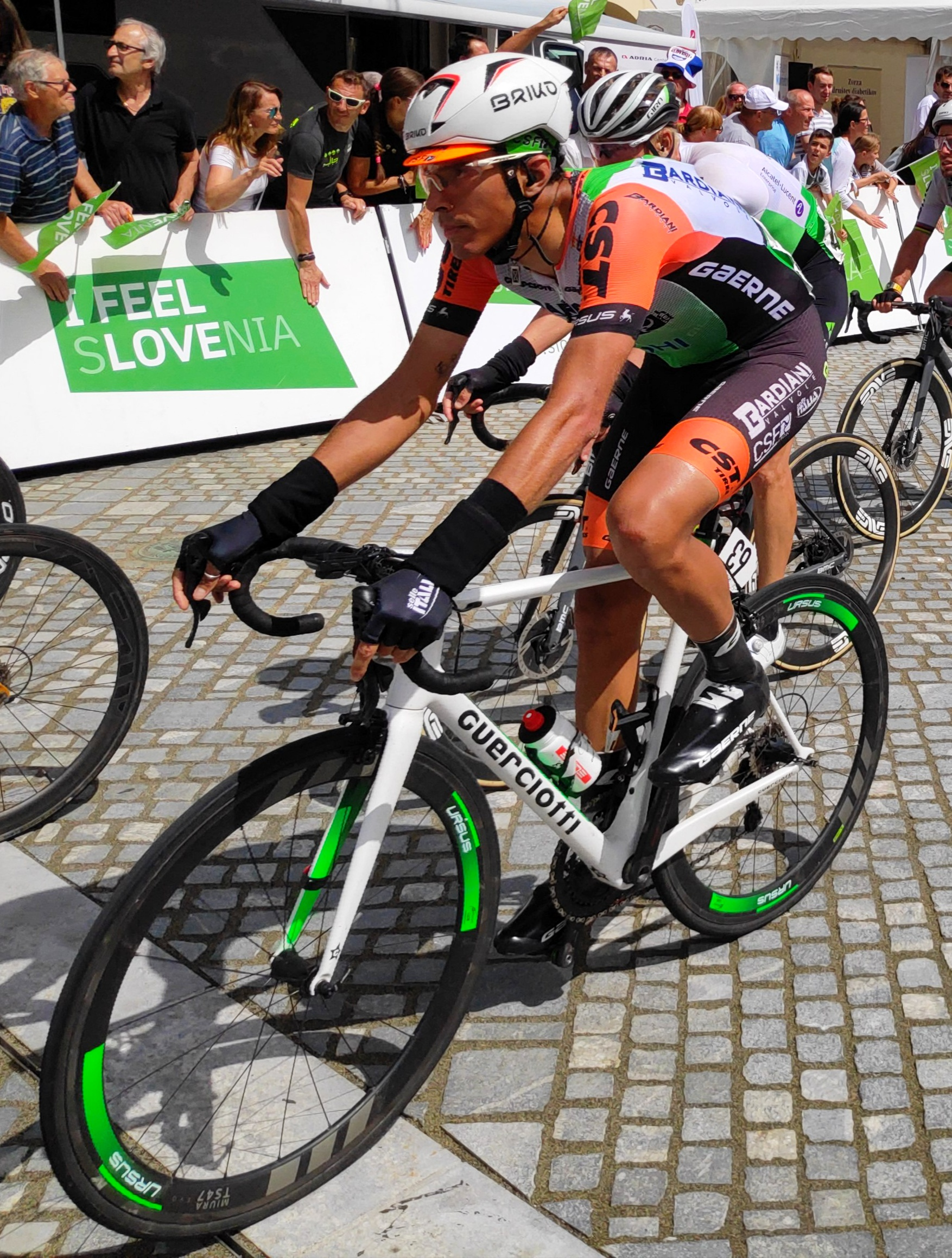
- Maestri at the 2019 Tour of Slovenia

Personal information
- Born: 26 October 1991 (age 34) Guastalla, Italy
- Height: 1.85 m (6 ft 1 in)
- Weight: 73 kg (161 lb)

Cycling career
- Sport: Cycling
- Current team: Team Polti VisitMalta
- Discipline: Road
- Role: Rider

Amateur team
- 2014–2015: General Store Bottoli Zardini

Professional teams
- 2016–2021: Bardiani–CSF
- 2022–: Eolo–Kometa
Medal record
Men's road bicycle racing
Representing Italy
European Championships
| Gold medal – first place | 2024 Limburg | Mixed team relay |

Mirco Maestri (born 26 October 1991) is an Italian cyclist, who currently rides for UCI ProTeam Team Polti VisitMalta. He was named in the start list for the 2016 Giro d'Italia.

== Major results ==
2015
2nd Trofeo Città di Brescia
2nd Memorial Vincenzo Mantovani
6th Giro del Medio Brenta
7th Coppa Collecchio
2017
1st Mountains classification, Tour of Turkey
2018
1st Overall International Tour of Rhodes

1st Points classification
1st Stage 4

2019
1st Points classification, Tirreno–Adriatico
1st Stage 2 (ITT) Tour of China I
2021
1st GP Slovenian Istria
1st GP Slovenia
2023
3rd Overall Tour Poitou-Charentes en Nouvelle-Aquitaine
2024
1st Time relay, UEC European Road Championships
6th Overall Tour Poitou-Charentes en Nouvelle-Aquitaine
Giro d'Italia

Combativity award Stages 9 & 18

2025
10th Tour de la Mirabelle

=== Grand Tour general classification results timeline ===
| Grand Tour | 2016 | 2017 | 2018 | 2019 | 2020 | 2021 | 2022 | 2023 | 2024 | 2025 |
|---|---|---|---|---|---|---|---|---|---|---|
| Giro d'Italia | 119 | 143 | DNF | 103 | — | — | 96 | 78 | 60 | 93 |
| Tour de France | — | — | — | — | — | — | — | — | — | — |
| Vuelta a España | — | — | — | — | — | — | — | — | — | — |

Legend
| — | Did not compete |
| DNF | Did not finish |
