= Santa Maria di Sala =

- Comune
- Comune di Santa Maria di Sala
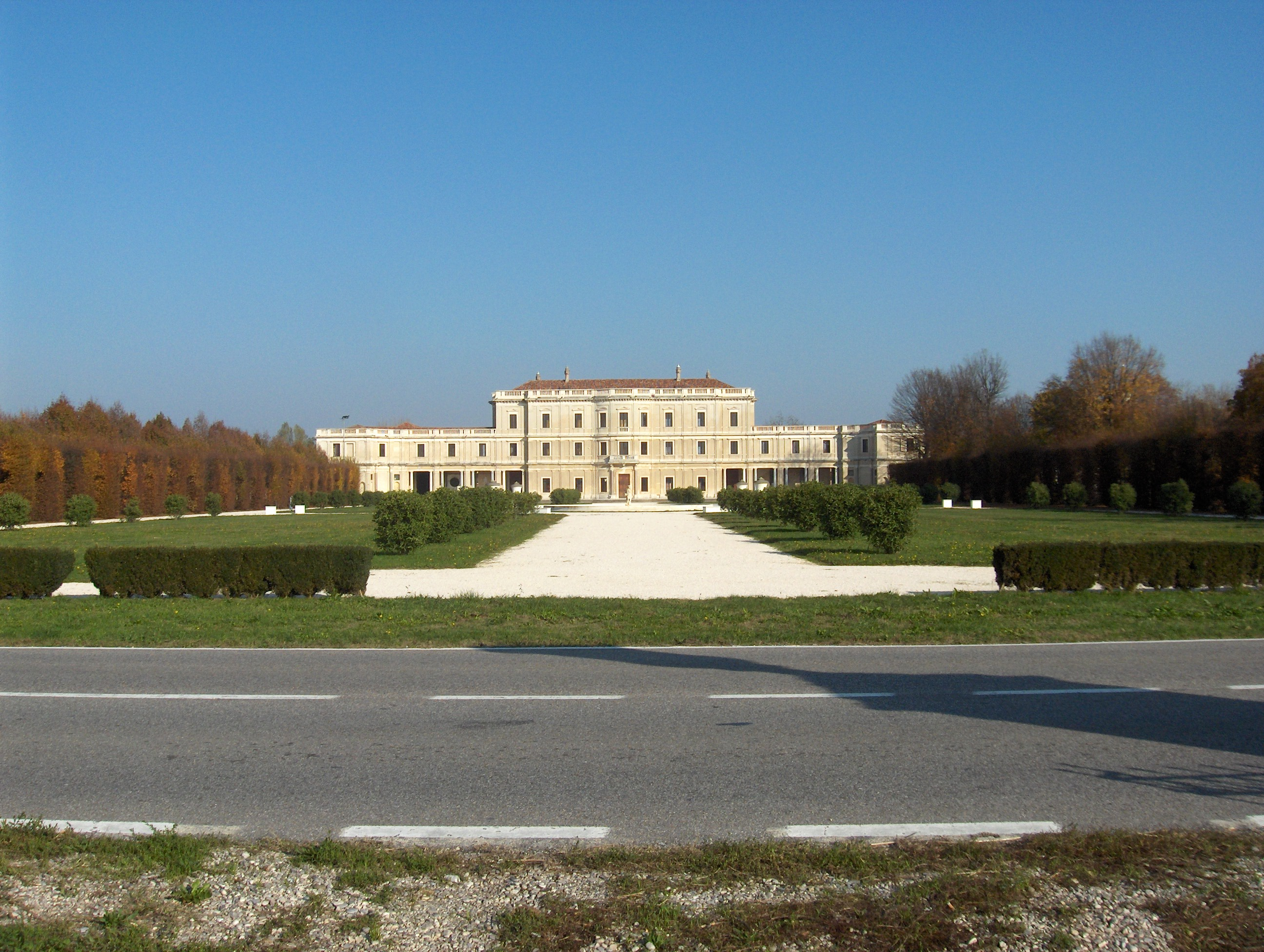
- Villa Farsetti

- Coat of arms

- Location within Italy Location within Veneto
- Coordinates: 45°30′N 12°2′E
- Country: Italy
- Region: Veneto
- Metropolitan city: Venice (VE)
- Frazioni: Caltana, Caselle de' Ruffi, Sant'Angelo, Stigliano, Veternigo

Government
  - Mayor: Natascia Rocchi

Area
  - Total: 27.97 km^{2} (10.80 sq mi)
- Elevation: 13 m (43 ft)

Population (28 February 2007)
  - Total: 16,267
  - Density: 581.6/km^{2} (1,506/sq mi)
- Demonym: Salesi or Saliesi
- Time zone: UTC+1 (CET)
  - Summer (DST): UTC+2 (CEST)
- Postal code: 30036
- Dialing code: 041
- ISTAT code: 027035
- Website: Official website

Santa Maria di Sala is a town in the Metropolitan City of Venice, Veneto, northern Italy. The most prominent building is Villa Farsetti, once belonging to an old Farsetti family, part of the Venetian nobility. In 1807, the villa was purchased by the wealthy Conte Demetrio de Mircovich after the death of the last heir, Atnonio Farsetti, in Saint Petersburg. Under Demetrio's ownership, the Villa experienced a period of renedwed proseprity. He was the one who offered it as first seat of the new Municipality, offering along the guest house Cavin di Sala. Owned by the Santa Maria di Sala Municipality, the villa today hosts some offices among which the library and various cultural events The town is crossed by the SP32 provincial road.

== Twin towns ==
Santa Maria di Sala is twinned with:

- Hvar, Croatia, since 2009

== Sources ==
- (Google Maps)
