= Skyway Monte Bianco =

Cable car on Mont Blanc in Italy

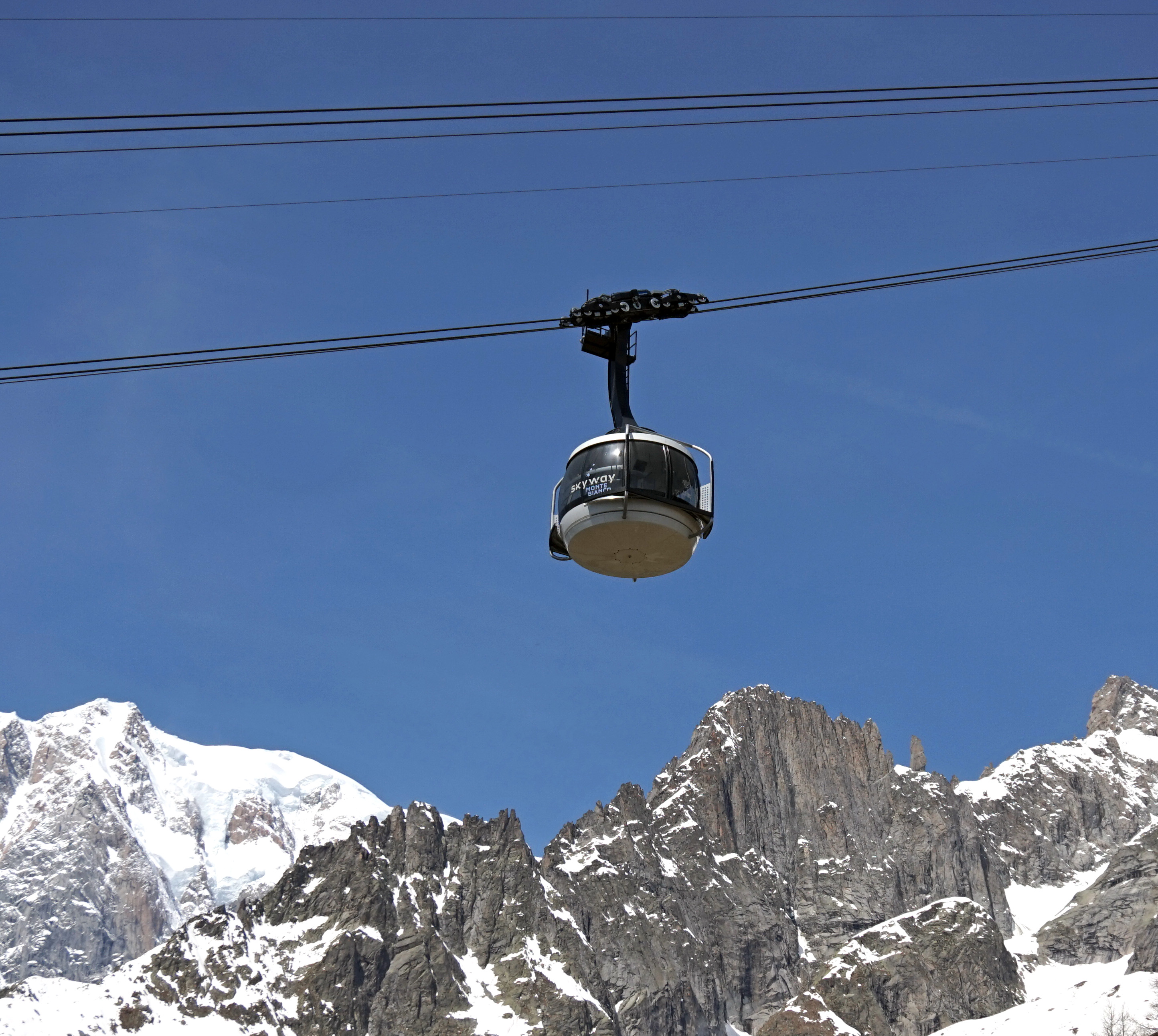

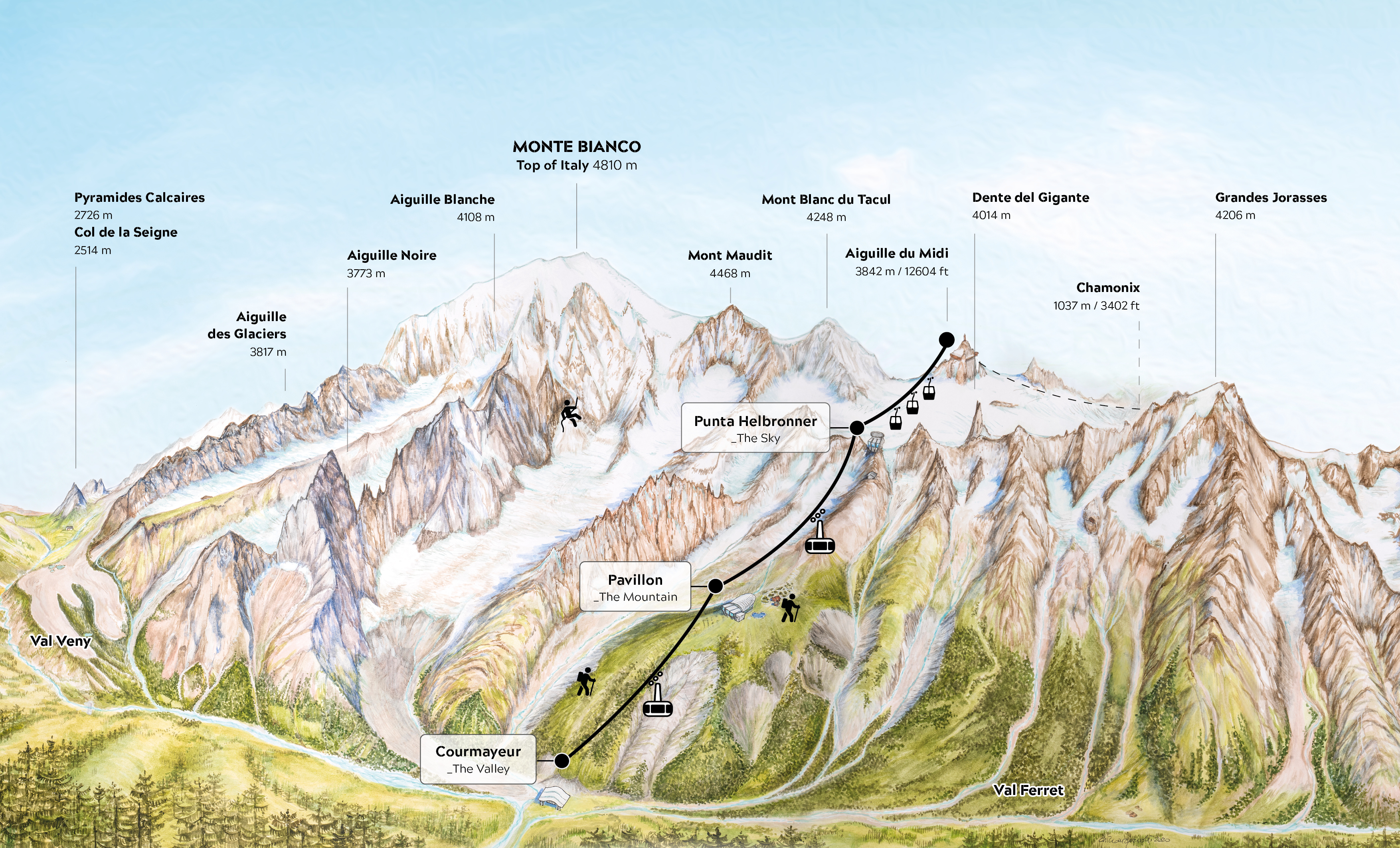
- Interactive map of Skyway Monte Bianco

Overview
- Status: Operational
- Country: Italy
- Coordinates: 45°48′57″N 6°57′23″E
- Termini: Entrèves, Courmayeur; Pointe Helbronner
- Construction cost: €138 million
- Open: 2015

Operation
- Operator: Funivie Monte Bianco S.p.A.
- Carrier capacity: 80 Passengers per cabin
- Trip duration: 4 min first half (Courmayeur to Pavillon), 7 min second half (Pavillon to Pointe Helbronner)

Technical features
- Line length: 4.500 m
- Operating speed: 9 m/s
- Vertical Interval: 2,166 m (7,106 ft)

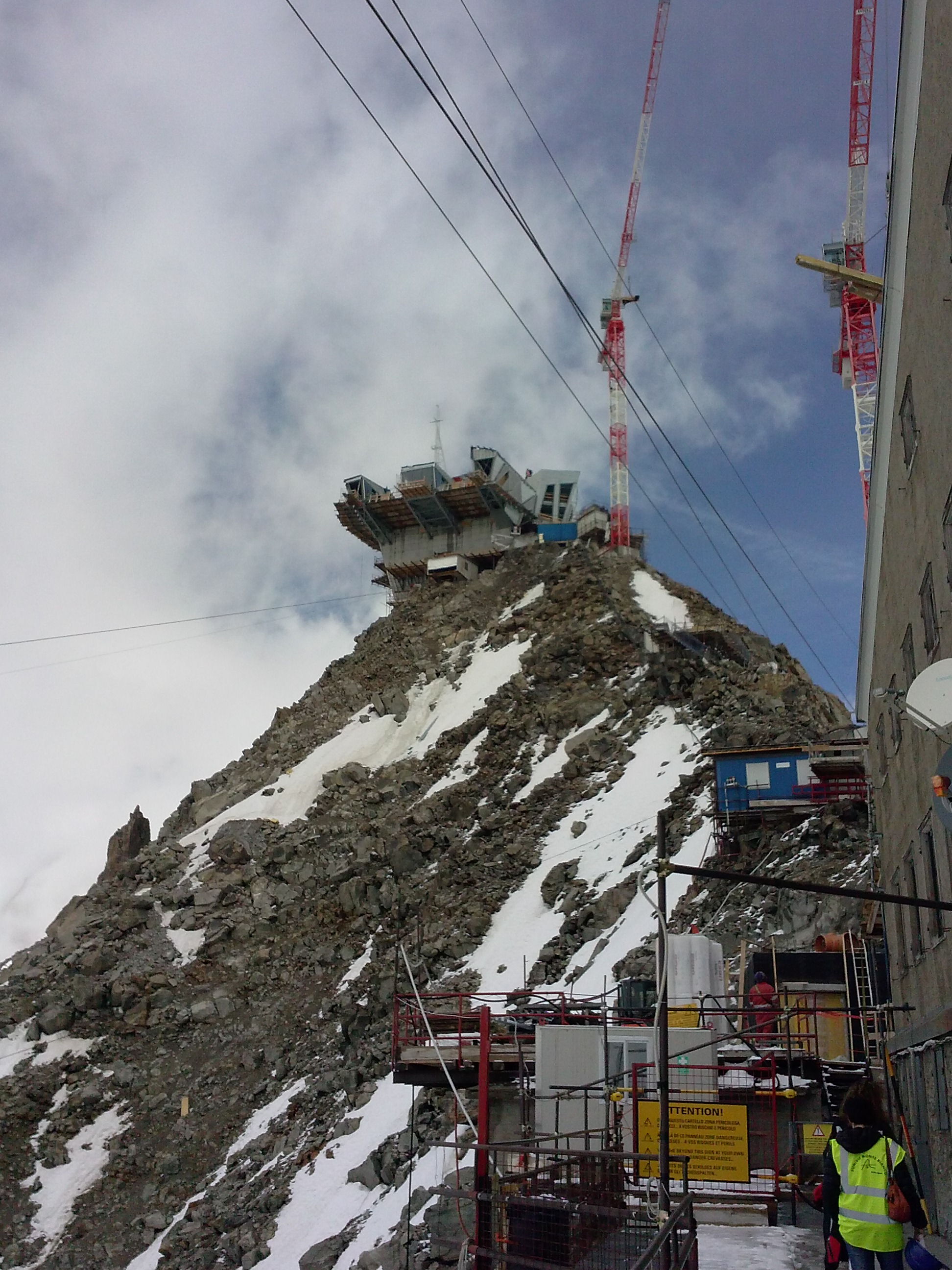
Construction work on the new Skyway Monte Bianco, 2014

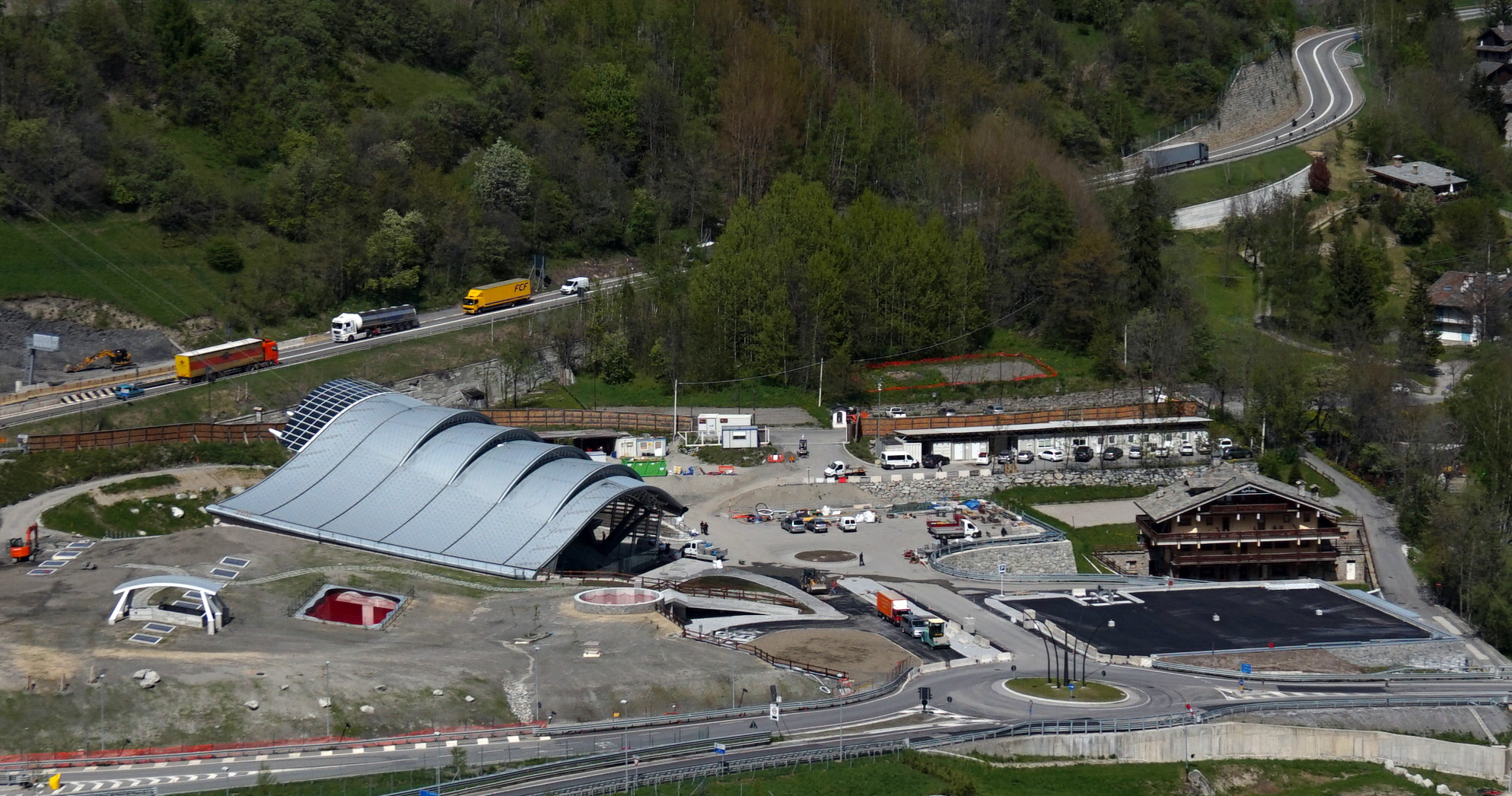
Pontal d'Entréves cable car station

Skyway Monte Bianco is a cable car in the Italian Alps, linking Entrèves, in the municipality of Courmayeur with Pointe Helbronner on the southern side of the Mont Blanc massif. Taking over three years to construct, it opened in 2015 at a cost of 110 million euros, and is considered to be the world's most expensive cable car installation.

== Facilities ==
From the cablecar base station at Entrèves (at an altitude of 1,300 meters above sea level), the Skyway Monte Bianco rises to a mid-way station at Pavillon du Mont-Fréty at an altitude of 2,173 meters. It takes six minutes to reach this point, during which time the 80-person cabin makes one complete rotation, giving visitors all-round views into the Aosta valley and along both Val Veny and Val Ferret, as well as improved access to the Italian side of the Mont Blanc massif and a link via the Vallée Blanche Aerial Tramway to the Aiguille du Midi, from where a separate cable car descends to the town of Chamonix in France.

The half-way station of the Pavillon contains a restaurant and conference centre, plus one of the highest botanical gardens in the region, containing some 900 alpine plant species, as well as access to a network of trails. Visitors can continue upwards via a second cable car which also slowly revolves, and takes ten minutes to reach Pointe Helbronner (known as the Eagles Nest) at an altitude of 3,466 meters. Tourist facilities and scenic viewpoints provide close views of Mont Blanc, Aiguille d'Entrèves and the Vallée Blanche, but also views further out towards the Matterhorn, Monte Rosa and Gran Paradiso. A tunnel and lift system provide access from the cable car terminus to the Torino Hut, a high-altitude mountain refuge offering accommodation both to tourists and to climbers intending to access the mountaineering routes of the range.

== Construction ==
The Skyway Monte Bianco was designed by the architect Carlo Rossi, took four years to construct, and involved complete rebuilding of the Pointe Helbronner terminus at a cost of 110 million euros. The cable cars were manufactured by Doppelmayr Cable Car and the top station was engineered so as to minimise energy consumption, and includes solar panels and highly efficient insulation in order to bring it close to a zero-energy building. The horizontal tunnel and vertical well which now give access to Pointe Helbronner, the Torino Hut and the Vallée Blanche, also serve to anchor the cable car station into the rock. The vertical lift shaft is a 5 metre wide well, approximately 70 m in depth. To avoid damage to the structural integrity of the mountain, explosives were not used during the tunnel's construction. Instead, a series of small holes were drilled, each 40 cm diameter, using a technique known as raise boring. The tunnel and vertical shaft together provide firm anchorage to the cable car equipment, each cable of which has to be capable of carrying loads of over 100 tons. The base of the vertical shaft also houses water tanks for fire-fighting purposes.

Permission to construct the new cable car included an agreement to remove the old cable car infrastructure. The full cost of the development, when all the associated infrastructure is included, was 138 million euros, making it the world's most expensive cable car installation at the time of its opening in 2015.

The cableway opened on 23 June 2015, and was much celebrated by the Italians, but ignored by the French. Italian Prime Minister Matteo Renzi officially opened the new cable car system, and was presented with a golden ice axe by regional president, Augusto Rollandin on their arrival at the summit station on Pointe Helbronner.

== Tourism impact ==
A corresponding, but much older cable car on the northern side of the Mont Blanc massif, which ascends from Chamonix to the Aiguille du Midi, attracts around 500,000 people per annum, with an annual turnover of 16 million euros. Previously the older Funivia Monte Bianco attracted 100,000 visitors per annum, but the new Skyway Monte Bianco was forecast to attract some 300,000 visitors per year.

Concerns were expressed by environmental organisations, both before and after the Skyway's construction. These centred around the 'disproportionate scale' and very high impact of the development on the mountain environment, as well as the commoditisation of the high alpine environment.

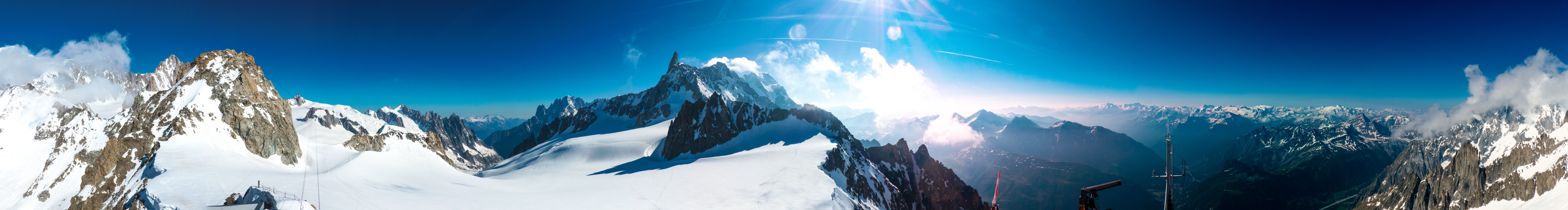
View across Mont Blanc massif from Skyway Monte Bianco's panoramic terrace on Punta Helbronner

== Film location ==
In 2016, Skyway Monte Bianco was used as the setting for an action-adventure sequence in the major comedy spy movie Kingsman: The Golden Circle.
