= 1999 UCI Road World Cup =

- Eleventh edition of the UCI Road World Cup

Details
- Dates: 20 March – 16 October
- Location: Europe
- Races: 10

Champions
- Individual champion: Andrei Tchmil (BEL) (Lotto–Mobistar)
- Teams' champion: Rabobank

The 1999 UCI Road World Cup was the eleventh edition of the UCI Road World Cup. It was won by Belgian classics specialist Andrei Tchmil.

== Races ==
Date	Race	Country	Winner	Team	World Cup Leader	Leader's Team	Report
20 March	Milan–San Remo	Italy	Andrei Tchmil (BEL)	Lotto–Mobistar	Andrei Tchmil (BEL)	Lotto–Mobistar	Report
4 April	Tour of Flanders	Belgium	Peter Van Petegem (BEL)	TVM–Farm Frites	Peter Van Petegem (BEL)	TVM–Farm Frites	Report
11 April	Paris–Roubaix	France	Andrea Tafi (ITA)	Mapei–Quick-Step	Andrei Tchmil (BEL)	Lotto–Mobistar	Report
18 April	Liège–Bastogne–Liège	Belgium	Frank Vandenbroucke (BEL)	Cofidis	Frank Vandenbroucke (BEL)	Cofidis	Report
24 April	Amstel Gold Race	Netherlands	Michael Boogerd (NED)	Rabobank	Frank Vandenbroucke (BEL)	Cofidis	Report
7 August	Clásica de San Sebastián	Spain	Francesco Casagrande (ITA)	Vini Caldirola	Andrei Tchmil (BEL)	Lotto–Mobistar	Report
15 August	HEW Cyclassics	Germany	Mirko Celestino (ITA)	Team Polti	Andrei Tchmil (BEL)	Lotto–Mobistar	Report
22 August	Grand Prix de Suisse	Switzerland	Grzegorz Gwiazdowski (POL)	Cofidis	Andrei Tchmil (BEL)	Lotto–Mobistar	Report
3 October	Paris–Tours	France	Marc Wauters (BEL)	Rabobank	Andrei Tchmil (BEL)	Lotto–Mobistar	Report
16 October	Giro di Lombardia	Italy	Mirko Celestino (ITA)	Team Polti	Andrei Tchmil (BEL)	Lotto–Mobistar	Report

== Single races details ==
worldcupjersey	Denotes the Classification Leader

In the race results the leader jersey identify the rider who wore the jersey in the race (the leader at the start of the race).

In the general classification table the jersey identify the leader after the race.

20 March 1999 — Milan–San Remo 294 km (182.7 mi)

	Rider	Team	Time
1	Andrei Tchmil (BEL)	Lotto–Mobistar	6h 52' 37"
2	Erik Zabel (GER)	Team Telekom	s.t.
3	Zbigniew Spruch (POL)	Lampre–Daikin	s.t.
4	Stefano Garzelli (ITA)	Mercatone Uno–Bianchi	s.t.
5	Lauri Aus (EST)	Casino–Ag2r Prévoyance	s.t.
6	Léon van Bon (NED)	Rabobank	s.t.
7	Peter Van Petegem (BEL)	TVM–Farm Frites	s.t.
8	Jo Planckaert (BEL)	Lotto–Mobistar	s.t.
9	George Hincapie (USA)	U.S. Postal Service	s.t.
10	Gabriele Balducci (ITA)	Navigare–Gaerne	s.t.

General classification after Milan–San Remo

	Rider	Team	Points
1	Andrei Tchmil (BEL)	Lotto–Mobistar	100
2	Erik Zabel (GER)	Team Telekom	70
3	Zbigniew Spruch (POL)	Lampre–Daikin	50
4	Stefano Garzelli (ITA)	Mercatone Uno–Bianchi	40
5	Lauri Aus (EST)	Casino–Ag2r Prévoyance	36
6	Léon van Bon (NED)	Rabobank	32
7	Peter Van Petegem (BEL)	TVM–Farm Frites	28
8	Jo Planckaert (BEL)	Lotto–Mobistar	24
9	George Hincapie (USA)	U.S. Postal Service	20
10	Gabriele Balducci (ITA)	Navigare–Gaerne	16

4 April 1999 — Tour of Flanders 270 km (167.8 mi)

	Rider	Team	Time
1	Peter Van Petegem (BEL)	TVM–Farm Frites	6h 15' 00"
2	Frank Vandenbroucke (BEL)	Cofidis	s.t.
3	Johan Museeuw (BEL)	Mapei–Quick-Step	+ 1"
4	Michele Bartoli (ITA)	Mapei–Quick-Step	+ 8"
5	Zbigniew Spruch (POL)	Lampre–Daikin	s.t.
6	Markus Zberg (SUI)	Rabobank	s.t.
7	Andrei Tchmil (BEL)	Lotto–Mobistar	s.t.
8	Tristan Hoffman (NED)	TVM–Farm Frites	s.t.
9	Denis Zanette (ITA)	Team Polti	s.t.
10	Lars Michaelsen (DEN)	Française des Jeux	s.t.

General classification after Tour of Flanders

	Rider	Team	Points
1	Peter Van Petegem (BEL)	TVM–Farm Frites	128
2	Andrei Tchmil (BEL)	Lotto–Mobistar	128
3	Zbigniew Spruch (POL)	Lampre–Daikin	86
4	Erik Zabel (GER)	Team Telekom	74
5	Frank Vandenbroucke (BEL)	Cofidis	70
6	Johan Museeuw (BEL)	Mapei–Quick-Step	50
7	Markus Zberg (SUI)	Rabobank	45
8	Michele Bartoli (ITA)	Mapei–Quick-Step	40
9	Stefano Garzelli (ITA)	Mercatone Uno–Bianchi	40
10	Lauri Aus (EST)	Casino–Ag2r Prévoyance	36

11 April 1999 — Paris–Roubaix 273 km (169.6 mi)

	Rider	Team	Time
1	Andrea Tafi (ITA)	Mapei–Quick-Step	6h 44' 15"
2	Wilfried Peeters (BEL)	Mapei–Quick-Step	+ 2' 14"
3	Tom Steels (BEL)	Mapei–Quick-Step	+ 2' 26"
4	George Hincapie (USA)	U.S. Postal Service	s.t.
5	Jo Planckaert (BEL)	Lotto–Mobistar	s.t.
6	Léon van Bon (NED)	Rabobank	s.t.
7	Frank Vandenbroucke (BEL)	Cofidis	s.t.
8	Andrei Tchmil (BEL)	Lotto–Mobistar	+ 2' 40"
9	Johan Museeuw (BEL)	Mapei–Quick-Step	s.t.
10	Lars Michaelsen (DEN)	Française des Jeux	+ 2' 53"

General classification after Paris–Roubaix

	Rider	Team	Points
1	Andrei Tchmil (BEL)	Lotto–Mobistar	152
2	Peter Van Petegem (BEL)	TVM–Farm Frites	129
3	Andrea Tafi (ITA)	Mapei–Quick-Step	100
4	Frank Vandenbroucke (BEL)	Cofidis	98
5	Zbigniew Spruch (POL)	Lampre–Daikin	98
6	Wilfried Peeters (BEL)	Mapei–Quick-Step	82
7	Erik Zabel (GER)	Team Telekom	74
8	Johan Museeuw (BEL)	Mapei-Quick Step	70
9	Léon van Bon (NED)	Rabobank	67
10	George Hincapie (USA)	U.S. Postal Service	65

18 April 1999 — Liège–Bastogne–Liège 264 km (164.0 mi)

	Rider	Team	Time
1	Frank Vandenbroucke (BEL)	Cofidis	6h 25' 36"
2	Michael Boogerd (NED)	Rabobank	+ 30"
3	Maarten den Bakker (NED)	Rabobank	+ 41"
4	Michele Bartoli (ITA)	Mapei–Quick-Step	+ 44"
5	Paolo Bettini (ITA)	Mapei–Quick-Step	+ 54"
6	Niki Aebersold (SUI)	Rabobank	+ 55"
7	Markus Zberg (SUI)	Rabobank	s.t.
8	Oscar Camenzind (SUI)	Lampre–Daikin	s.t.
9	Udo Bölts (GER)	Team Telekom	s.t.
10	Laurent Roux (FRA)	Casino–Ag2r Prévoyance	s.t.

General classification after Liège–Bastogne–Liège

	Rider	Team	Points
1	Frank Vandenbroucke (BEL)	Cofidis	198
2	Andrei Tchmil (BEL)	Lotto–Mobistar	161
3	Peter Van Petegem (BEL)	TVM–Farm Frites	129
4	Zbigniew Spruch (POL)	Lampre–Daikin	112
5	Andrea Tafi (ITA)	Mapei–Quick-Step	100
6	Wilfried Peeters (BEL)	Mapei–Quick-Step	82
7	Michele Bartoli (ITA)	Mapei–Quick-Step	80
8	Erik Zabel (GER)	Team Telekom	74
9	Markus Zberg (SUI)	Rabobank	73
10	Michael Boogerd (NED)	Rabobank	70
10	Johan Museeuw (BEL)	Mapei-Quick Step	70

24 April 1999 — Amstel Gold Race 253 km (157.2 mi)

	Rider	Team	Time
1	Michael Boogerd (NED)	Rabobank	6h 37' 23"
~~2~~	~~Lance Armstrong (USA)~~	~~U.S. Postal Service~~	~~s.t.~~
3	Gabriele Missaglia (ITA)	Lampre–Daikin	s.t.
4	Maarten den Bakker (NED)	Rabobank	s.t.
5	Laurent Roux (FRA)	Casino–Ag2r Prévoyance	s.t.
6	Léon van Bon (NED)	Rabobank	+ 46"
7	Markus Zberg (SUI)	Rabobank	s.t.
8	Gian Matteo Fagnini (ITA)	Saeco–Cannondale	+ 51"
9	Daniele Nardello (ITA)	Mapei–Quick-Step	s.t.
10	Marco Velo (ITA)	Mercatone Uno–Bianchi	+ 54"

General classification after Amstel Gold Race

	Rider	Team	Points
1	Frank Vandenbroucke (BEL)	Cofidis	199
2	Michael Boogerd (NED)	Rabobank	170
3	Andrei Tchmil (BEL)	Lotto–Mobistar	168
4	Peter Van Petegem (BEL)	TVM–Farm Frites	135
5	Zbigniew Spruch (POL)	Lampre–Daikin	124
6	Markus Zberg (SUI)	Rabobank	101
7	Andrea Tafi (ITA)	Mapei–Quick-Step	100
8	Léon van Bon (NED)	Rabobank	99
9	Maarten den Bakker (NED)	Rabobank	98
10	Michele Bartoli (ITA)	Mapei–Quick-Step	91

7 August 1999 — Clásica de San Sebastián 230 km (142.9 mi)

	Rider	Team	Time
1	Francesco Casagrande (ITA)	Vini Caldirola	5h 15' 29"
~~2~~	Rik Verbrugghe (BEL)	Lotto–Mobistar	+ 43"
3	Giuliano Figueras (ITA)	Mapei–Quick-Step	s.t.
4	Andrei Tchmil (BEL)	Lotto–Mobistar	s.t.
5	Salvatore Commesso (ITA)	Saeco–Cannondale	s.t.
6	Francisco Mancebo (ESP)	Banesto	s.t.
7	Erik Dekker (NED)	Rabobank	s.t.
8	Max Sciandri (GBR)	Française des Jeux	s.t.
9	Michael Boogerd (NED)	Rabobank	s.t.
10	Massimiliano Mori (ITA)	Saeco–Cannondale	s.t.

General classification after Clásica de San Sebastián

	Rider	Team	Points
1	Andrei Tchmil (BEL)	Lotto–Mobistar	208
2	Frank Vandenbroucke (BEL)	Cofidis	199
3	Michael Boogerd (NED)	Rabobank	190
4	Peter Van Petegem (BEL)	TVM–Farm Frites	135
5	Zbigniew Spruch (POL)	Lampre–Daikin	124
6	Markus Zberg (SUI)	Rabobank	101
7	Andrea Tafi (ITA)	Mapei–Quick-Step	100
8	Léon van Bon (NED)	Rabobank	99
9	Maarten den Bakker (NED)	Rabobank	98
10	Michele Bartoli (ITA)	Mapei–Quick-Step	91

15 August 1999 — HEW Cyclassics 253 km (157.2 mi)

	Rider	Team	Time
1	Mirko Celestino (ITA)	Team Polti	6h 20' 39"
~~2~~	Raphael Schweda (GER)	Team Nürnberger	+ 3"
3	Romāns Vainšteins (LAT)	Française des Jeux	s.t.
4	Johan Museeuw (BEL)	Mapei–Quick-Step	s.t.
5	George Hincapie (USA)	U.S. Postal Service	s.t.
6	Ivan Basso (ITA)	Riso Scotti–Vinavil	s.t.
7	Erik Dekker (NED)	Rabobank	s.t.
8	Franco Ballerini (ITA)	Lampre–Daikin	s.t.
9	Erik Zabel (GER)	Team Telekom	+ 12"
10	Jürgen Werner (GER)	Team Nürnberger	s.t.

General classification after HEW Cyclassics

	Rider	Team	Points
1	Andrei Tchmil (BEL)	Lotto–Mobistar	217
2	Frank Vandenbroucke (BEL)	Cofidis	199
3	Michael Boogerd (NED)	Rabobank	190
4	Peter Van Petegem (BEL)	TVM–Farm Frites	145
5	Johan Museeuw (BEL)	Mapei–Quick-Step	124
6	Zbigniew Spruch (POL)	Lampre–Daikin	124
7	Erik Zabel (GER)	Team Telekom	107
8	George Hincapie (USA)	U.S. Postal Service	101
9	Markus Zberg (SUI)	Rabobank	101
10	Mirko Celestino (ITA)	Team Polti	100
10	Andrea Tafi (ITA)	Mapei–Quick-Step	100

22 August 1999 — Grand Prix de Suisse 245.3 km (152.4 mi)

	Rider	Team	Time
1	Grzegorz Gwiazdowski (POL)	Cofidis	6h 19' 48"
~~2~~	Sergio Barbero (ITA)	Mercatone Uno–Bianchi	+ 28"
3	Andrei Tchmil (BEL)	Lotto–Mobistar	+ 34"
4	Paolo Bettini (ITA)	Mapei–Quick-Step	s.t.
5	Andrey Kivilev (KAZ)	Festina–Lotus	s.t.
6	Michael Boogerd (NED)	Rabobank	s.t.
7	Davide Rebellin (ITA)	Team Polti	s.t.
8	Laurent Brochard (FRA)	Festina–Lotus	s.t.
9	Mikel Zarrabeitia (ESP)	ONCE–Deutsche Bank	s.t.
10	Jörg Jaksche (GER)	Team Telekom	s.t.

General classification after Grand Prix de Suisse

	Rider	Team	Points
1	Andrei Tchmil (BEL)	Lotto–Mobistar	267
2	Michael Boogerd (NED)	Rabobank	222
3	Frank Vandenbroucke (BEL)	Cofidis	199
4	Peter Van Petegem (BEL)	TVM–Farm Frites	145
5	Johan Museeuw (BEL)	Mapei–Quick-Step	137
6	Zbigniew Spruch (POL)	Lampre–Daikin	124
7	Erik Zabel (GER)	Team Telekom	107
8	Paolo Bettini (ITA)	Mapei–Quick-Step	105
9	Markus Zberg (SUI)	Rabobank	102
10	George Hincapie (USA)	U.S. Postal Service	101

3 October 1999 — Paris–Tours 254 km (157.8 mi)

	Rider	Team	Time
1	Marc Wauters (BEL)	Rabobank	6h 09' 54"
~~2~~	Gianni Faresin (ITA)	Mapei–Quick-Step	+ 10"
3	Jaan Kirsipuu (EST)	Casino–Ag2r Prévoyance	+ 14"
4	Fabrizio Guidi (ITA)	Team Polti	s.t.
5	Marco Serpellini (ITA)	Lampre–Daikin	s.t.
6	Ludovic Capelle (BEL)	Home Market–Ville de Charleroi	s.t.
7	Fabio Baldato (ITA)	Ballan–Alessio	s.t.
8	Léon van Bon (NED)	Rabobank	s.t.
9	Andrei Tchmil (BEL)	Lotto–Mobistar	s.t.
10	Aart Vierhouten (NED)	Rabobank	s.t.

General classification after Paris–Tours

	Rider	Team	Points
1	Andrei Tchmil (BEL)	Lotto–Mobistar	287
2	Michael Boogerd (NED)	Rabobank	227
3	Frank Vandenbroucke (BEL)	Cofidis	214
4	Peter Van Petegem (BEL)	TVM–Farm Frites	153
5	Johan Museeuw (BEL)	Mapei–Quick-Step	138
6	Zbigniew Spruch (POL)	Lampre–Daikin	131
7	Léon van Bon (NED)	Rabobank	123
8	Paolo Bettini (ITA)	Mapei–Quick-Step	117
9	Markus Zberg (SUI)	Rabobank	113
10	Marc Wauters (BEL)	Rabobank	107
10	Erik Zabel (GER)	Team Telekom	107

16 October 1999 — Giro di Lombardia 262 km (162.8 mi)

	Rider	Team	Time
1	Mirko Celestino (ITA)	Team Polti	6h 21' 50"
~~2~~	Danilo Di Luca (ITA)	Cantina Tollo–Alexia Alluminio	s.t.
3	Eddy Mazzoleni (ITA)	Saeco–Cannondale	s.t.
4	Oscar Camenzind (SUI)	Lampre–Daikin	+ 2"
5	Dimitri Konyshev (RUS)	Mercatone Uno–Bianchi	s.t.
6	Markus Zberg (SUI)	Rabobank	+ 11"
7	Marco Serpellini (ITA)	Lampre–Daikin	s.t.
8	Marco Velo (ITA)	Mercatone Uno–Bianchi	+ 11"
9	Paolo Bettini (ITA)	Mapei–Quick-Step	s.t.
10	Christophe Moreau (FRA)	Festina–Lotus	s.t.

General classification after Giro di Lombardia

	Rider	Team	Points
1	Andrei Tchmil (BEL)	Lotto–Mobistar	299
2	Michael Boogerd (NED)	Rabobank	238
3	Frank Vandenbroucke (BEL)	Cofidis	214
4	Peter Van Petegem (BEL)	TVM–Farm Frites	153
5	Markus Zberg (SUI)	Rabobank	145
6	Johan Museeuw (BEL)	Mapei–Quick-Step	138
7	Paolo Bettini (ITA)	Mapei–Quick-Step	137
8	Zbigniew Spruch (POL)	Lampre–Daikin	131
9	Léon van Bon (NED)	Rabobank	123
10	Marc Wauters (BEL)	Rabobank	107

== Final standings ==
=== Individual ===
Points are awarded to the top 25 classified riders. Riders must start at least 6 races to be classified.

The points are awarded for every race using the following system:

Position	1st	2nd	3rd	4th	5th	6th	7th	8th	9th	10th	11th	12th	13th	14th	15th	16th	17th	18th	19th	20th	21st	22nd	23rd	24th	25th
Points	100	70	50	40	36	32	28	24	20	16	15	14	13	12	11	10	9	8	7	6	5	4	3	2	1

Pos.	Rider	Team	MSR	ToF	ROU	LBL	AGR	CSS	HEW	SUI	TOU	LOM	Pts.
1	Andrei Tchmil (BEL)	Lotto–Mobistar	100	28	24	9	7	40	9	50	20	12	299
2	Michael Boogerd (NED)	Rabobank	0	DNS	DNS	70	100	20	0	32	5	11	238
3	Frank Vandenbroucke (BEL)	Cofidis	0	70	28	100	1	0	0	0	15	DNS	214
4	Peter Van Petegem (BEL)	TVM–Farm Frites	28	100	1	0	6	0	10	0	8	0	153
5	Markus Zberg (SUI)	Rabobank	13	32	DNS	28	28	DNS	DNS	1	11	32	145
6	Johan Museeuw (BEL)	Mapei–Quick-Step	0	50	20	DNS	14	0	40	13	1	DNS	138
7	Paolo Bettini (ITA)	Mapei–Quick-Step	0	DNS	DNS	36	0	15	14	40	12	20	137
8	Zbigniew Spruch (POL)	Lampre–Daikin	50	36	12	14	12	DNS	DNS	0	7	0	131
9	Léon van Bon (NED)	Rabobank	32	3	32	DNS	32	0	0	DNS	24	DNS	123
10	Marc Wauters (BEL)	Rabobank	0	7	0	DNS	DNS	DNS	0	DNS	100	0	107
11	George Hincapie (USA)	U.S. Postal Service	20	5	40	DNS	0	0	36	DNS	DNS	DNS	101
12	Andrea Tafi (ITA)	Mapei–Quick-Step	0	0	100	DNS	0	DNS	0	0	DNS	0	100
13	Maarten den Bakker (NED)	Rabobank	0	8	DNS	50	40	0	0	0	0	DNS	98
14	Erik Dekker (NED)	Rabobank	0	0	0	DNS	15	28	28	14	9	DNS	94
15	Wilfried Peeters (BEL)	Mapei–Quick-Step	0	12	70	DNS	0	DNS	7	DNS	0	DNS	89
16	Sergio Barbero (ITA)	Mercatone Uno–Bianchi	DNS	0	0	0	0	9	DNS	70	DNS	0	79
17	Oscar Camenzind (SUI)	Lampre–Daikin	0	36	40	DNS	0	1	DNS	DNS	0	DNS	74
18	Jo Planckaert (BEL)	Lotto–Mobistar	0	DNS	DNS	24	DNS	0	DNS	0	10	40	69
19	Romāns Vainšteins (LAT)	Française des Jeux	0	1	DNS	DNS	10	DNS	50	0	0	DNS	61
20	Fabrizio Guidi (ITA)	Team Polti	0	0	0	DNS	8	0	12	DNS	40	DNS	60
Race winners not eligible for general classification
Pos.	Rider	Team	MSR	ToF	ROU	LBL	AGR	CSS	HEW	SUI	TOU	LOM	Pts.
-	Mirko Celestino (ITA)	Team Polti	0	DNS	DNS	DNS	0	DNS	100	0	DNS	100	200
-	Grzegorz Gwiazdowski (POL)	Cofidis	DNS	DNS	DNS	DNS	DNS	DNS	DNS	100	0	0	100
-	Francesco Casagrande (ITA)	Vini Caldirola	DNS	DNS	DNS	DNS	DNS	100	DNS	0	0	0	100

Key
Colour	Result
Gold	Winner
Silver	2nd place
Bronze	3rd place
Green	Top ten position
Blue	Other points position
Purple	Out of points, retired
Red	Did not start (DNS)

=== Teams ===
Points are awarded to the top 10 teams. Teams must start at least 8 races to be classified. The first 18 teams in world ranking must start in all races. The points are awarded for every race using the following system:

Position	1st	2nd	3rd	4th	5th	6th	7th	8th	9th	10th
Points	12	9	8	7	6	5	4	3	2	1

Pos.	Team	MSR	ToF	ROU	LBL	AGR	CSS	HEW	SUI	TOU	LOM	Pts.
1	Rabobank	8	9	8	12	12	6	6	9	12	12	94
2	Mapei–Quick-Step	0	12	12	9	9	8	12	12	8	7	89
3	Lotto–Mobistar	12	6	9	7	7	12	5	4	7	5	73
4	Lampre–Daikin	7	8	6	8	8	0	0	0	9	8	54
5	Team Polti	5	5	2	0	4	0	9	6	0	4	36
