= List of teams and cyclists in the 2019 Giro d'Italia =

List of cyclists

The following is a list of teams and cyclists that took part in the 2019 Giro d'Italia.

== Teams ==
All 18 UCI WorldTeams were automatically invited and were obliged to attend the race. Four wildcard UCI Professional Continental teams were also selected. Because of an agreement between RCS Sport and the organisers of the Coppa Italia di ciclismo (the Italian Road Cycling Cup) one of the four wildcards is traditionally reserved for the overall cup winner. One of the wildcards was therefore awarded to Androni Giocattoli–Sidermec. On 25 January 2019, the race organisers announced that the other three wildcards were awarded to Bardiani–CSF, Israel Cycling Academy and Nippo–Vini Fantini–Faizanè. All of the wildcard teams had previously participated in the Giro, and three out of the four teams participated in the previous year. The one exception was Nippo–Vini Fantini, whose last participation in the Giro was in 2016. Each team started with eight riders. The on-stage presentation of the teams took place in Bologna on 9 May, two days before the opening stage.

The teams entering the race were:

UCI WorldTeams

- AG2R La Mondiale
- Astana
- Bahrain–Merida
- Bora–Hansgrohe
- CCC Team
- Deceuninck–Quick-Step
- EF Education First
- Groupama–FDJ
- Team Katusha–Alpecin
- Lotto–Soudal
- Mitchelton–Scott
- Movistar Team
- Team Dimension Data
- Team Jumbo–Visma
- Team Sunweb
- Trek–Segafredo
- UAE Team Emirates
- Team Ineos

UCI Professional Continental teams

- Androni Giocattoli–Sidermec
- Bardiani–CSF
- Israel Cycling Academy
- Nippo–Vini Fantini–Faizanè

== Cyclists ==
Legend
No.	Starting number worn by the rider during the Giro
Pos.	Position in the general classification
Time	Deficit to the winner of the general classification
†	Denotes riders born on or after 1 January 1994 eligible for the young rider classification
General classification	Denotes the winner of the general classification
Points classification	Denotes the winner of the points classification
Mountains classification	Denotes the winner of the mountains classification
Young rider classification	Denotes the winner of the young rider classification
HD	Denotes a rider who failed to finish within the time limit, followed by the stage in which this occurred
DNS	Denotes a rider who did not start, followed by the stage before which he withdrew
DNF	Denotes a rider who did not finish, followed by the stage in which he withdrew
DSQ	Denotes a rider who did was disqualified, followed by the stage in which this occurred
Ages correct as of 11 May 2019, the date on which the Giro began

=== By starting number ===
No.	Name	Nationality	Team	Age	Pos.	Time	Ref.
1	Mikel Landa	Spain	Movistar Team	29	4	+ 2' 38"	
2	Andrey Amador	Costa Rica	Movistar Team	32	39	+ 1h 33' 00"	
3	Richard Carapaz	Ecuador	Movistar Team	25	1	90h 01'47"	
4	Héctor Carretero †	Spain	Movistar Team	23	88	+ 3h 33' 45"	
5	Lluís Mas	Spain	Movistar Team	29	126	+ 5h 00' 44"	
6	Antonio Pedrero	Spain	Movistar Team	27	46	+ 1h 56' 03"	
7	José Joaquín Rojas	Spain	Movistar Team	33	50	+ 2h 03' 31"	
8	Jasha Sütterlin	Germany	Movistar Team	26	120	+ 4h 53' 09"	
11	Tony Gallopin	France	AG2R La Mondiale	30	DNF-16	-	
12	François Bidard	France	AG2R La Mondiale	27	30	+ 1h 16' 55"	
13	Nico Denz †	Germany	AG2R La Mondiale	25	124	+ 4h 58' 12"	
14	Hubert Dupont	France	AG2R La Mondiale	38	47	+ 1h 56' 44"	
15	Ben Gastauer	Luxembourg	AG2R La Mondiale	31	79	+ 3h 09' 32"	
16	Nans Peters †	France	AG2R La Mondiale	25	61	+ 2h 31' 42"	
17	Larry Warbasse	United States	AG2R La Mondiale	28	52	+ 2h 07' 02"	
18	Alexis Vuillermoz	France	AG2R La Mondiale	30	29	+ 1h 12' 04"	
21	Francesco Gavazzi	Italy	Androni Giocattoli–Sidermec	34	59	+ 2h 24' 42"	
22	Manuel Belletti	Italy	Androni Giocattoli–Sidermec	33	109	+ 4h 20' 44"	
23	Mattia Cattaneo	Italy	Androni Giocattoli–Sidermec	28	28	+ 1h 09' 11"	
24	Miguel Eduardo Flórez †	Colombia	Androni Giocattoli–Sidermec	23	72	+ 2h 57' 12"	
25	Marco Frapporti	Italy	Androni Giocattoli–Sidermec	34	81	+ 3h 14' 04"	
26	Fausto Masnada	Italy	Androni Giocattoli–Sidermec	25	20	+ 34' 52"	
27	Matteo Montaguti	Italy	Androni Giocattoli–Sidermec	35	53	+ 2h 07' 24"	
28	Andrea Vendrame †	Italy	Androni Giocattoli–Sidermec	24	55	+ 2h 12' 22"	
31	Miguel Ángel López †	Colombia	Astana	25	7	+ 7' 26"	
32	Pello Bilbao	Spain	Astana	29	31	+ 1h 17' 41"	
33	Manuele Boaro	Italy	Astana	32	90	+ 3h 35' 32"	
34	Dario Cataldo	Italy	Astana	34	48	+ 1h 57' 41"	
35	Jan Hirt	Czechia	Astana	28	27	+ 1h 05' 38"	
36	Ion Izagirre	Spain	Astana	30	36	+ 1h 28' 25"	
37	Davide Villella	Italy	Astana	27	60	+ 2h 27' 26"	
38	Andrey Zeits	Kazakhstan	Astana	32	26	+ 1h 05' 28"	
41	Vincenzo Nibali	Italy	Bahrain–Merida	34	2	+ 1' 05"	
42	Valerio Agnoli	Italy	Bahrain–Merida	34	93	+ 3h 52' 52"	
43	Grega Bole	Slovenia	Bahrain–Merida	33	110	+ 4h 22' 27"	
44	Damiano Caruso	Italy	Bahrain–Merida	31	23	+ 49' 06"	
45	Andrea Garosio	Italy	Bahrain–Merida	25	98	+ 4h 00' 28"	
46	Kristijan Koren	Slovenia	Bahrain–Merida	32	DNS-5	-	
47	Antonio Nibali	Italy	Bahrain–Merida	26	76	+ 3h 04' 26"	
48	Domenico Pozzovivo	Italy	Bahrain–Merida	36	19	+ 33' 40"	
51	Enrico Barbin	Italy	Bardiani–CSF	29	DNF-14	-	
52	Giovanni Carboni †	Italy	Bardiani–CSF	23	57	+ 2h 18' 35"	
53	Luca Covili †	Italy	Bardiani–CSF	22	84	+ 3h 20' 58"	
54	Mirco Maestri	Italy	Bardiani–CSF	27	103	+ 4h 11' 52"	
55	Umberto Orsini †	Italy	Bardiani–CSF	24	DNS-9	-	
56	Lorenzo Rota †	Italy	Bardiani–CSF	23	85	+ 3h 25' 08"	
57	Manuel Senni	Italy	Bardiani–CSF	27	58	+ 2h 20' 43"	
58	Paolo Simion	Italy	Bardiani–CSF	26	140	+ 5h 35' 22"	
61	Rafał Majka	Poland	Bora–Hansgrohe	29	6	+ 6' 56"	
62	Pascal Ackermann †	Germany	Bora–Hansgrohe	24	122	+ 4h 56' 45"	
63	Cesare Benedetti	Italy	Bora–Hansgrohe	31	74	+ 3h 03' 12"	
64	Davide Formolo	Italy	Bora–Hansgrohe	26	15	+ 22' 38"	
65	Jay McCarthy	Australia	Bora–Hansgrohe	26	62	+ 2h 40' 04"	
66	Paweł Poljański	Poland	Bora–Hansgrohe	29	89	+ 3h 35' 14"	
67	Michael Schwarzmann	Germany	Bora–Hansgrohe	28	114	+ 4h 29' 32"	
68	Rüdiger Selig	Germany	Bora–Hansgrohe	30	127	+ 5h 02' 30"	
71	Amaro Antunes	Portugal	CCC Team	28	54	+ 2h 09' 51"	
72	Josef Černý	Czechia	CCC Team	26	115	+ 4h 31' 48"	
73	Víctor de la Parte	Spain	CCC Team	32	21	+ 39' 51"	
74	Kamil Gradek	Poland	CCC Team	28	129	+ 5h 07' 15"	
75	Jakub Mareczko †	Italy	CCC Team	25	HD-12	-	
76	Łukasz Owsian	Poland	CCC Team	29	73	+ 3h 00' 02"	
77	Laurens ten Dam	Netherlands	CCC Team	38	DNF-6	-	
78	Francisco José Ventoso	Spain	CCC Team	37	87	+ 3h 28' 10"	
81	Elia Viviani	Italy	Deceuninck–Quick-Step	30	DNS-12	-	
82	Eros Capecchi	Italy	Deceuninck–Quick-Step	32	37	+ 1h 32' 21"	
83	Mikkel Frølich Honoré †	Denmark	Deceuninck–Quick-Step	22	101	+ 4h 07' 49"	
84	Bob Jungels	Luxembourg	Deceuninck–Quick-Step	26	33	+ 1h 22' 57"	
85	James Knox †	Great Britain	Deceuninck–Quick-Step	23	DNS-13	-	
86	Fabio Sabatini	Italy	Deceuninck–Quick-Step	34	92	+ 3h 43' 50"	
87	Florian Sénéchal	France	Deceuninck–Quick-Step	25	DNF-20	-	
88	Pieter Serry	Belgium	Deceuninck–Quick-Step	30	38	+ 1h 32' 54"	
91	Sacha Modolo	Italy	EF Education First	31	DNF-7	-	
92	Sean Bennett †	United States	EF Education First	23	106	+ 4h 17' 00"	
93	Matti Breschel	Denmark	EF Education First	34	DNF-4	-	
94	Nathan Brown	United States	EF Education First	27	67	+ 2h 44' 52"	
95	Jonathan Kléver Caicedo	Ecuador	EF Education First	26	108	+ 4h 18' 35"	
96	Hugh Carthy †	Great Britain	EF Education First	24	11	+ 16' 36"	
97	Joe Dombrowski	United States	EF Education First	27	12	+ 20' 12"	
98	Tanel Kangert	Estonia	EF Education First	32	18	+ 30' 11"	
101	Arnaud Démare	France	Groupama–FDJ	27	123	+ 4h 56' 59"	
102	Jacopo Guarnieri	Italy	Groupama–FDJ	31	132	+ 5h 16' 07"	
103	Ignatas Konovalovas	Lithuania	Groupama–FDJ	33	DNF-13	-	
104	Olivier Le Gac	France	Groupama–FDJ	25	112	+ 4h 27' 17"	
105	Tobias Ludvigsson	Sweden	Groupama–FDJ	28	82	+ 3h 15' 57"	
106	Valentin Madouas †	France	Groupama–FDJ	22	13	+ 21' 59"	
107	Miles Scotson †	Australia	Groupama–FDJ	25	138	+ 5h 33' 49"	
109	Ramon Sinkeldam	Netherlands	Groupama–FDJ	30	133	+ 5h 21' 10"	
111	Davide Cimolai	Italy	Israel Cycling Academy	29	130	+ 5h 08' 52"	
112	Awet Gebremedhin	Sweden	Israel Cycling Academy	27	128	+ 5h 06' 26"	
113	Guillaume Boivin	Canada	Israel Cycling Academy	29	125	+ 4h 58' 58"	
114	Conor Dunne	Ireland	Israel Cycling Academy	27	135	+ 5h 26' 52"	
115	Krists Neilands †	Latvia	Israel Cycling Academy	24	100	+ 4h 06' 28"	
116	Rubén Plaza	Spain	Israel Cycling Academy	39	71	+ 2h 55' 14"	
117	Guy Niv †	Israel	Israel Cycling Academy	25	113	+ 4h 29' 11"	
118	Kristian Sbaragli	Italy	Israel Cycling Academy	29	77	+ 3h 06' 36"	
121	Caleb Ewan †	Australia	Lotto–Soudal	24	DNS-12	-	
122	Victor Campenaerts	Belgium	Lotto–Soudal	27	111	+ 4h 25' 03"	
123	Jasper De Buyst	Belgium	Lotto–Soudal	25	DNF-15	-	
124	Thomas De Gendt	Belgium	Lotto–Soudal	32	51	+ 2h 06' 26"	
125	Adam Hansen	Australia	Lotto–Soudal	38	68	+ 2h 46' 43"	
126	Roger Kluge	Germany	Lotto–Soudal	33	DNS-13	-	
127	Jelle Vanendert	Belgium	Lotto–Soudal	34	DNF-5	-	
128	Tosh Van der Sande	Belgium	Lotto–Soudal	28	64	+ 2h 41' 58"	
131	Simon Yates	Great Britain	Mitchelton–Scott	26	8	+ 7' 49"	
132	Jack Bauer	New Zealand	Mitchelton–Scott	34	95	+ 3h 53' 06"	
133	Brent Bookwalter	United States	Mitchelton–Scott	35	DNS-16	-	
134	Esteban Chaves	Colombia	Mitchelton–Scott	29	40	+ 1h 33' 12"	
135	Luke Durbridge	Australia	Mitchelton–Scott	28	78	+ 3h 09' 24"	
136	Lucas Hamilton †	Australia	Mitchelton–Scott	23	25	+ 1h 04' 31"	
137	Christopher Juul-Jensen	Denmark	Mitchelton–Scott	29	70	+ 2h 50' 33"	
138	Mikel Nieve	Spain	Mitchelton–Scott	34	17	+ 27' 46"	
141	Marco Canola	Italy	Nippo–Vini Fantini–Faizanè	30	107	+ 4h 18' 19"	
142	Damiano Cima	Italy	Nippo–Vini Fantini–Faizanè	25	137	+ 5h 29' 19"	
143	Nicola Bagioli †	Italy	Nippo–Vini Fantini–Faizanè	24	DNF-16	-	
144	Juan José Lobato	Spain	Nippo–Vini Fantini–Faizanè	30	134	+ 5h 26' 51"	
145	Giovanni Lonardi †	Italy	Nippo–Vini Fantini–Faizanè	22	DNF-13	-	
146	Hiroki Nishimura †	Japan	Nippo–Vini Fantini–Faizanè	24	HD-1	-	
147	Sho Hatsuyama	Japan	Nippo–Vini Fantini–Faizanè	30	142	+ 6h 05' 56"	
148	Ivan Santaromita	Italy	Nippo–Vini Fantini–Faizanè	35	102	+ 4h 08' 19"	
151	Ben O'Connor †	Australia	Team Dimension Data	23	32	+ 1h 17' 49"	
152	Scott Davies †	Great Britain	Team Dimension Data	23	118	+ 4h 44' 40"	
153	Enrico Gasparotto	Italy	Team Dimension Data	37	69	+ 2h 50' 28"	
154	Amanuel Ghebreigzabhier †	Eritrea	Team Dimension Data	23	45	+ 1h 54' 33"	
155	Ryan Gibbons †	South Africa	Team Dimension Data	24	91	+ 3h 39' 32"	
156	Giacomo Nizzolo	Italy	Team Dimension Data	30	DNS-13	-	
157	Mark Renshaw	Australia	Team Dimension Data	36	DNF-13	-	
158	Danilo Wyss	Switzerland	Team Dimension Data	33	83	+ 3h 18' 24"	
161	Pavel Sivakov †	Russia	Team Ineos	21	9	+ 8' 56"	
162	Eddie Dunbar †	Ireland	Team Ineos	22	22	+ 42' 26"	
163	Tao Geoghegan Hart †	Great Britain	Team Ineos	24	DNF-13	-	
164	Sebastián Henao	Colombia	Team Ineos	25	24	+ 58' 45"	
165	Christian Knees	Germany	Team Ineos	38	96	+ 3h 54' 54"	
166	Jhonatan Narváez †	Ecuador	Team Ineos	22	80	+ 3h 10' 04"	
167	Salvatore Puccio	Italy	Team Ineos	29	86	+ 3h 25' 43"	
168	Iván Ramiro Sosa †	Colombia	Team Ineos	21	44	+ 1h 54' 16"	
171	Primož Roglič	Slovenia	Team Jumbo–Visma	29	3	+ 2' 30"	
172	Koen Bouwman	Netherlands	Team Jumbo–Visma	25	41	+ 1h 36' 40"	
173	Laurens De Plus †	Belgium	Team Jumbo–Visma	23	DNF-7	-	
174	Sepp Kuss †	United States	Team Jumbo–Visma	24	56	+ 2h 15' 24"	
175	Tom Leezer	Netherlands	Team Jumbo–Visma	33	119	+ 4h 51' 26"	
176	Paul Martens	Germany	Team Jumbo–Visma	35	75	+ 3h 03' 30"	
177	Antwan Tolhoek †	Netherlands	Team Jumbo–Visma	25	65	+ 2h 43' 16"	
178	Jos van Emden	Netherlands	Team Jumbo–Visma	34	104	+ 4h 13' 34"	
181	Ilnur Zakarin	Russia	Team Katusha–Alpecin	29	10	+ 12' 14"	
182	Enrico Battaglin	Italy	Team Katusha–Alpecin	29	66	+ 2h 44' 14"	
183	Jenthe Biermans †	Belgium	Team Katusha–Alpecin	23	117	+ 4h 35' 35"	
184	Marco Haller	Austria	Team Katusha–Alpecin	28	116	+ 4h 31' 59"	
185	Reto Hollenstein	Switzerland	Team Katusha–Alpecin	33	94	+ 3h 53' 05"	
186	Viacheslav Kuznetsov	Russia	Team Katusha–Alpecin	29	DNF-17	-	
187	Daniel Navarro	Spain	Team Katusha–Alpecin	35	DNF-4	-	
188	Dmitry Strakhov †	Russia	Team Katusha–Alpecin	23	121	+ 4h 56' 00"	
191	Tom Dumoulin	Netherlands	Team Sunweb	28	DNF-5	-	
192	Jan Bakelants	Belgium	Team Sunweb	33	43	+ 1h 49' 34"	
193	Chad Haga	United States	Team Sunweb	30	105	+ 4h 13' 46"	
194	Chris Hamilton †	Australia	Team Sunweb	23	34	+ 1h 24' 02"	
195	Jai Hindley †	Australia	Team Sunweb	23	35	+ 1h 28' 09"	
196	Sam Oomen †	Netherlands	Team Sunweb	23	DNF-14	-	
197	Robert Power †	Australia	Team Sunweb	24	DNF-6	-	
198	Louis Vervaeke	Belgium	Team Sunweb	25	DNF-13	-	
201	Bauke Mollema	Netherlands	Trek–Segafredo	32	5	+ 5' 43"	
202	Gianluca Brambilla	Italy	Trek–Segafredo	32	49	+ 1h 59' 02"	
203	Giulio Ciccone †	Italy	Trek–Segafredo	24	16	+ 27' 19"	
204	Will Clarke	Australia	Trek–Segafredo	34	141	+ 6h 00' 17"	
205	Nicola Conci †	Italy	Trek–Segafredo	22	63	+ 2h 41' 00"	
206	Michael Gogl	Austria	Trek–Segafredo	25	97	+ 3h 58' 26"	
207	Markel Irizar	Spain	Trek–Segafredo	39	136	+ 5h 28' 23"	
208	Matteo Moschetti †	Italy	Trek–Segafredo	22	DNS-11	-	
211	Fernando Gaviria †	Colombia	UAE Team Emirates	24	DNF-7	-	
212	Tom Bohli †	Switzerland	UAE Team Emirates	25	139	+ 5h 34' 50"	
213	Simone Consonni †	Italy	UAE Team Emirates	24	131	+ 5h 09' 31"	
214	Valerio Conti	Italy	UAE Team Emirates	26	DNS-18	-	
215	Marco Marcato	Italy	UAE Team Emirates	35	99	+ 4h 06' 17"	
216	Juan Sebastián Molano †	Colombia	UAE Team Emirates	24	DNS-4	-	
217	Jan Polanc	Slovenia	UAE Team Emirates	27	14	+ 22' 38"	
218	Diego Ulissi	Italy	UAE Team Emirates	29	42	+ 1h 38' 34"	

=== By team ===
Movistar Team (MOV)
No.	Rider	Pos.
1	Mikel Landa (ESP)	4
2	Andrey Amador (CRC)	39
3	Richard Carapaz (ECU)	1
4	Héctor Carretero (ESP)	88
5	Lluís Mas (ESP)	126
6	Antonio Pedrero (ESP)	46
7	José Joaquín Rojas (ESP)	50
8	Jasha Sütterlin (GER)	120
Directeur sportif: José Vicente García

AG2R La Mondiale (ALM)
No.	Rider	Pos.
11	Tony Gallopin (FRA)	DNF-16
12	François Bidard (FRA)	30
13	Nico Denz (GER)	124
14	Hubert Dupont (FRA)	47
15	Ben Gastauer (LUX)	79
16	Nans Peters (FRA)	61
17	Larry Warbasse (USA)	52
18	Alexis Vuillermoz (FRA)	29
Directeur sportif: Laurent Biondi

Androni Giocattoli–Sidermec (ANS)
No.	Rider	Pos.
21	Francesco Gavazzi (ITA)	59
22	Manuel Belletti (ITA)	109
23	Mattia Cattaneo (ITA)	28
24	Miguel Eduardo Flórez (COL)	72
25	Marco Frapporti (ITA)	81
26	Fausto Masnada (ITA)	20
27	Matteo Montaguti (ITA)	53
28	Andrea Vendrame (ITA)	55
Directeur sportif: Gianni Savio

Astana (AST)
No.	Rider	Pos.
31	Miguel Ángel López (COL)	7
32	Pello Bilbao (ESP)	31
33	Manuele Boaro (ITA)	90
34	Dario Cataldo (ITA)	48
35	Jan Hirt (CZE)	27
36	Ion Izagirre (ESP)	36
37	Davide Villella (ITA)	60
38	Andrey Zeits (KAZ)	26
Directeur sportif: Alexandr Shefer

Bahrain–Merida (TBM)
No.	Rider	Pos.
41	Vincenzo Nibali (ITA)	2
42	Valerio Agnoli (ITA)	93
43	Grega Bole (SLO)	110
44	Damiano Caruso (ITA)	23
45	Andrea Garosio (ITA)	98
46	Kristijan Koren (SLO)	DNS-5
47	Antonio Nibali (ITA)	76
48	Domenico Pozzovivo (ITA)	19
Directeur sportif: Alberto Volpi

Bardiani–CSF (BRD)
No.	Rider	Pos.
51	Enrico Barbin (ITA)	DNF-14
52	Giovanni Carboni (ITA)	57
53	Luca Covili (ITA)	84
54	Mirco Maestri (ITA)	103
55	Umberto Orsini (ITA)	DNS-9
56	Lorenzo Rota (ITA)	85
57	Manuel Senni (ITA)	58
58	Paolo Simion (ITA)	140
Directeur sportif: Roberto Reverberi

Bora–Hansgrohe (BOH)
No.	Rider	Pos.
61	Rafał Majka (POL)	6
62	Pascal Ackermann (GER)	122
63	Cesare Benedetti (ITA)	74
64	Davide Formolo (ITA)	15
65	Jay McCarthy (AUS)	62
66	Paweł Poljański (POL)	89
67	Michael Schwarzmann (GER)	114
68	Rüdiger Selig (GER)	127
Directeur sportif: Jens Zemke

CCC Team (CCC)
No.	Rider	Pos.
71	Amaro Antunes (POR)	54
72	Josef Černý (CZE)	115
73	Víctor de la Parte (ESP)	21
74	Kamil Gradek (POL)	129
75	Jakub Mareczko (ITA)	HD-12
76	Łukasz Owsian (POL)	73
77	Laurens ten Dam (NED)	DNF-6
78	Francisco José Ventoso (ESP)	87
Directeur sportif: Gabriele Missaglia

Deceuninck–Quick-Step (DQT)
No.	Rider	Pos.
81	Elia Viviani (ITA)	DNS-12
82	Eros Capecchi (ITA)	37
83	Mikkel Frølich Honoré (DEN)	101
84	Bob Jungels (LUX)	33
85	James Knox (GBR)	DNS-13
86	Fabio Sabatini (ITA)	92
87	Florian Sénéchal (FRA)	DNF-20
88	Pieter Serry (BEL)	38
Directeur sportif: Davide Bramati

EF Education First (EF1)
No.	Rider	Pos.
91	Sacha Modolo (ITA)	DNF-7
92	Sean Bennett (USA)	106
93	Matti Breschel (DEN)	DNF-4
94	Nathan Brown (USA)	67
95	Jonathan Kléver Caicedo (ECU)	108
96	Hugh Carthy (GBR)	11
97	Joe Dombrowski (USA)	12
98	Tanel Kangert (EST)	18
Directeur sportif: Fabrizio Guidi

Groupama–FDJ (GFC)
No.	Rider	Pos.
101	Arnaud Démare (FRA)	123
102	Jacopo Guarnieri (ITA)	132
103	Ignatas Konovalovas (LTU)	DNF-13
104	Olivier Le Gac (FRA)	112
105	Tobias Ludvigsson (SWE)	82
106	Valentin Madouas (FRA)	13
107	Miles Scotson (AUS)	138
109	Ramon Sinkeldam (NED)	133
Directeur sportif: Frédéric Guesdon

Israel Cycling Academy (ICA)
No.	Rider	Pos.
111	Davide Cimolai (ITA)	130
112	Awet Gebremedhin (SWE)	128
113	Guillaume Boivin (CAN)	125
114	Conor Dunne (IRL)	135
115	Krists Neilands (LAT)	100
116	Rubén Plaza (ESP)	71
117	Guy Niv (ISR)	113
118	Kristian Sbaragli (ITA)	77
Directeur sportif: Oscar Guerrero

Lotto–Soudal (LTS)
No.	Rider	Pos.
121	Caleb Ewan (AUS)	DNS-12
122	Victor Campenaerts (BEL)	111
123	Jasper De Buyst (BEL)	DNF-15
124	Thomas De Gendt (BEL)	51
125	Adam Hansen (AUS)	68
126	Roger Kluge (GER)	DNS-13
127	Jelle Vanendert (BEL)	DNF-5
128	Tosh Van der Sande (BEL)	64
Directeur sportif: Bart Leysen

Mitchelton–Scott (MTS)
No.	Rider	Pos.
131	Simon Yates (GBR)	8
132	Jack Bauer (NZL)	95
133	Brent Bookwalter (USA)	DNS-16
134	Esteban Chaves (COL)	40
135	Luke Durbridge (AUS)	78
136	Lucas Hamilton (AUS)	25
137	Christopher Juul-Jensen (DEN)	70
138	Mikel Nieve (ESP)	17
Directeur sportif: Matthew White

Nippo–Vini Fantini–Faizanè (NIP)
No.	Rider	Pos.
141	Marco Canola (ITA)	107
142	Damiano Cima (ITA)	137
143	Nicola Bagioli (ITA)	DNF-16
144	Juan José Lobato (ESP)	134
145	Giovanni Lonardi (ITA)	DNF-13
146	Hiroki Nishimura (JPN)	HD-1
147	Sho Hatsuyama (JPN)	142
148	Ivan Santaromita (ITA)	102
Directeur sportif: Mario Manzoni

Team Dimension Data (TDD)
No.	Rider	Pos.
151	Ben O'Connor (AUS)	32
152	Scott Davies (GBR)	118
153	Enrico Gasparotto (ITA)	69
154	Amanuel Ghebreigzabhier (ERI)	45
155	Ryan Gibbons (SAF)	91
156	Giacomo Nizzolo (ITA)	DNS-13
157	Mark Renshaw (AUS)	DNF-13
158	Danilo Wyss (SUI)	83
Directeur sportif: Alexandre Sans Vega

Team Ineos (INS)
No.	Rider	Pos.
161	Pavel Sivakov (RUS)	9
162	Eddie Dunbar (IRL)	22
163	Tao Geoghegan Hart (GBR)	DNF-13
164	Sebastián Henao (COL)	24
165	Christian Knees (GER)	96
166	Jhonatan Narváez (ECU)	80
167	Salvatore Puccio (ITA)	86
168	Iván Ramiro Sosa (COL)	44
Directeur sportif: Nicolas Portal

Team Jumbo–Visma (TJV)
No.	Rider	Pos.
171	Primož Roglič (SLO)	3
172	Koen Bouwman (NED)	41
173	Laurens De Plus (BEL)	DNF-7
174	Sepp Kuss (USA)	56
175	Tom Leezer (NED)	119
176	Paul Martens (GER)	75
177	Antwan Tolhoek (NED)	65
178	Jos van Emden (NED)	104
Directeur sportif: Jan Boven

Team Katusha–Alpecin (TKA)
No.	Rider	Pos.
181	Ilnur Zakarin (RUS)	10
182	Enrico Battaglin (ITA)	66
183	Jenthe Biermans (BEL)	117
184	Marco Haller (AUT)	116
185	Reto Hollenstein (SUI)	94
186	Viacheslav Kuznetsov (RUS)	DNF-17
187	Daniel Navarro (ESP)	DNF-4
188	Dmitry Strakhov (RUS)	121
Directeur sportif: Dmitriy Konychev

Team Sunweb (SUN)
No.	Rider	Pos.
191	Tom Dumoulin (NED)	DNF-5
192	Jan Bakelants (BEL)	43
193	Chad Haga (USA)	105
194	Chris Hamilton (AUS)	34
195	Jai Hindley (AUS)	35
196	Sam Oomen (NED)	DNF-14
197	Robert Power (AUS)	DNF-6
198	Louis Vervaeke (BEL)	DNF-13
Directeur sportif: Marc Reef

Trek–Segafredo (TFS)
No.	Rider	Pos.
201	Bauke Mollema (NED)	5
202	Gianluca Brambilla (ITA)	49
203	Giulio Ciccone (ITA)	16
204	Will Clarke (AUS)	141
205	Nicola Conci (ITA)	63
206	Michael Gogl (AUT)	97
207	Markel Irizar (ESP)	136
208	Matteo Moschetti (ITA)	DNS-11
Directeur sportif: Kim Andersen

UAE Team Emirates (UAD)
No.	Rider	Pos.
211	Fernando Gaviria (COL)	DNF-7
212	Tom Bohli (SUI)	139
213	Simone Consonni (ITA)	131
214	Valerio Conti (ITA)	DNS-18
215	Marco Marcato (ITA)	99
216	Juan Sebastián Molano (COL)	DNS-4
217	Jan Polanc (SLO)	14
218	Diego Ulissi (ITA)	42
Directeur sportif: José Antonio Fernandez Rodriguez

=== By nationality ===
The 176 riders that are competing in the 2019 Giro d'Italia originated from 33 different countries.

Country	No. of riders	Finishers	Stage wins
Australia	12	9	2 (Caleb Ewan x2)
Austria	2	2	
Belgium	10	6	
Canada	1	1	
Colombia	7	5	2 (Fernando Gaviria, Esteban Chaves)
Costa Rica	1	1	
Czechia	2	2	
Denmark	3	2	
Ecuador	3	3	2 (Richard Carapaz x2)
Eritrea	1	1	
Estonia	1	1	
France	9	7	2 (Arnaud Démare, Nans Peters)
Germany	8	7	2 (Pascal Ackermann x2)
Great Britain	5	3	
Ireland	2	2	
Israel	1	1	
Italy	51	41	5 (Fausto Masnada, Cesare Benedetti, Dario Cataldo, Giulio Ciccone, Damiano Cima)
Japan	2	1	
Kazakhstan	1	1	
Latvia	1	1	
Lithuania	1	0	
Luxembourg	2	2	
Netherlands	9	6	
New Zealand	1	1	
Poland	4	4	
Portugal	1	1	
Russia	4	3	1 (Ilnur Zakarin)
Slovenia	4	3	2 (Primož Roglič x2)
South Africa	1	1	
Spain	14	13	2 (Pello Bilbao x2)
Switzerland	3	3	
Sweden	2	2	
United States	7	6	1 (Chad Haga)
Total	176	142	21
