= 1999 Züri-Metzgete =

1999 UCI Road World Cup

Race details
- Dates: 22 August 1999
- Stages: 1
- Distance: 245.3 km (152.4 mi)
- Winning time: 6h 19' 48"

Results
	Winner	Grzegorz Gwiazdowski (POL)	(Cofidis)
	Second	Sergio Barbero (ITA)	(Mercatone Uno–Bianchi)
	Third	Andrei Tchmil (BEL)	(Lotto–Mobistar)

The 1999 Züri-Metzgete was the 84th edition of the Züri-Metzgete road cycling one day race. It was held on 22 August 1999 as part of the 1999 UCI Road World Cup. The race was won by Grzegorz Gwiazdowski of Poland.

== Result ==
Rank	Rider	Team	Time
1	Grzegorz Gwiazdowski (POL)	Cofidis	6h 19' 48"
2	Sergio Barbero (ITA)	Mercatone Uno–Bianchi	+ 28"
3	Andrei Tchmil (BEL)	Lotto–Mobistar	+ 34"
4	Paolo Bettini (ITA)	Mapei–Quick-Step	s.t.
5	Andrey Kivilev (KAZ)	Festina–Lotus	s.t.
6	Michael Boogerd (NED)	Rabobank	s.t.
7	Davide Rebellin (ITA)	Team Polti	s.t.
8	Laurent Brochard (FRA)	Festina–Lotus	s.t.
9	Mikel Zarrabeitia (ESP)	ONCE–Deutsche Bank	s.t.
10	Jörg Jaksche (GER)	Team Telekom	s.t.
