= 1999 HEW Cyclassics =

Race details
- Dates: 15 August 1999
- Stages: 1
- Distance: 253 km (157.2 mi)
- Winning time: 6h 20' 39"

Results
	Winner	Mirko Celestino (ITA)
	Second	Raphael Schweda (GER)
	Third	Romāns Vainšteins (LAT)

The 1999 HEW Cyclassics was the fourth edition of the HEW Cyclassics cycle race and was held on 15 August 1999. The race started and finished in Hamburg. The race was won by Mirko Celestino.

== General classification ==
Final general classification

	Cyclist	Team	Time
1	Mirko Celestino (ITA)	Team Polti	6h 20' 39"
~~2~~	Raphael Schweda (GER)	Team Nürnberger	+ 3"
3	Romāns Vainšteins (LAT)	Française des Jeux	s.t.
4	Johan Museeuw (BEL)	Mapei–Quick-Step	s.t.
5	George Hincapie (USA)	U.S. Postal Service	s.t.
6	Ivan Basso (ITA)	Riso Scotti–Vinavil	s.t.
7	Erik Dekker (NED)	Rabobank	s.t.
8	Franco Ballerini (ITA)	Lampre–Daikin	s.t.
9	Erik Zabel (GER)	Team Telekom	+ 12"
10	Jürgen Werner (GER)	Team Nürnberger	s.t.
