= Team Nürnberger =

German cycling team

Team information
- UCI code: NUR
- Registered: Germany
- Founded: 1995
- Disbanded: 2002
- Discipline: Road
- Status: Trade Team II

Key personnel
- Team managers: Udo Sprenger; Uwe Raab; Bert Dietz

Team name history
- 1996–2002: Team Nürnberger

Team Nürnberger was a German road cycling team that competed professionally between 1996 and 2002.

== Major wins ==
1996
Acht van Chaam, Mike Weissmann
1999
Overall Hessen-Rundfahrt, Jens Zemke (1999)
Overall Sachsen-Tour, Jörn Reuß
Rund um die Nürnberger Altstadt, Jens Zemke
2000
Overall Sachsen-Tour, Thomas Liese
Rund um die Nürnberger Altstadt, Raphael Schweda
Rund um Düren, Jürgen Werner
2001
Beverbeek Classic, Koen Das
2002
Rund um Düren, Lubor Tesař
