= Rund um Düren =

Cycling road race in Germany

Race details
- Date: Mid April
- Region: North Rhine-Westphalia, Germany
- English name: Tour of Düren
- Local name(s): Rund um Düren (in German)
- Discipline: Road
- Competition: UCI Europe Tour
- Type: Single-day
- Web site: www.rsv-dueren.de

History
- First edition: 1950
- Editions: 60 (as of 2010)
- First winner: Willi Meurer (GER)
- Most wins: Wilfried Trott (GER) (3 wins)
- Most recent: Sven Krauss (GER)

The Rund um Düren is a cycling road race held in mid-April in Germany. The event, ranked at 1.2 on the UCI European calendar, is contested around the city of Düren. Prior to 1996 it was an amateur event.

== Winners ==
Year	Country	Rider	Team
1950	West Germany	Willi Meurer	
1951	West Germany	Horst Tüller	
1952	West Germany	Albert Mussfeld	
1953	West Germany	Herbert Hebbers	
1954	West Germany	Hans Junkermann	
1955	West Germany	Horst Backat	
1956	West Germany	Hans Schramm	
1957	West Germany	Herbert Wallenborn	
1958	West Germany	Hans Schramm	
1959	West Germany	Herbert Blochj	
1960	West Germany	Ludwig Troche	
1961	West Germany	Günter Mendyka	
1962	West Germany	Mike Coupe	
1963	West Germany	Heinz Rüschoff	
1964	West Germany	Burkhard Ebert	
1965	West Germany	Ulrich Schönell	
1966	West Germany	Werner Ertel	
1967	West Germany	Ortwin Czarnowski	
1968	West Germany	Johannes Knab	
1969	Belgium	George Barras	
1970	West Germany	Burkhard Ebert	
1971	Belgium	Grégoire Van Moer	
1972	West Germany	Wilfried Trott	
1973	Belgium	Willy Govaerts	
1974	Denmark	Sven-Erik Bjerg	
1975	Netherlands	Mattias Buckx	
1976	Belgium	Alfred Dockx	
1977	Belgium	Daniel Willems	
1978	West Germany	Uwe Bolten	
1979	West Germany	Wilfried Trott	
1980	West Germany	Wilfried Trott	
1981	Poland	Janusz Bienek	
1982	No race		
1983	West Germany	Peter Hilse	
1984	West Germany	Thomas Freienstein	
1985	West Germany	Thomas Freienstein	
1986	West Germany	Remig Stumpf	
1987	West Germany	Uwe Messerschmidt	
1988	West Germany	Werner Wüller	
1989	Poland	Mieczysław Mazurek	
1990	Netherlands	Patrick Rasch	
1991	Netherlands	Rob Compas	
1992	Netherlands	Eric Van Der Heide	
1993	Russia	Petro Koshelenko	
1994	Belgium	Rik Claeys	
1995	Germany	Lutz Lehmann	
1996	Belgium	Eric De Clercq	Collstrop-Lystex
1997	Germany	Sven Teutenberg	US Postal Service
1998	Germany	Torsten Schmidt	Team Chicky World
1999	Denmark	Allan Johansen	Team Chicky World
2000	Germany	Jürgen Werner	Team Nürnberger
2001	Norway	Bjørnar Vestøl	Team Fakta
2002	Czech Republic	Lubor Tesař	Team Nürnberger
2003	Germany	Lars Teutenberg	Germany (national team)
2004	Germany	David Kopp	Team Lamonta
2005	Germany	Robert Retschke	Team ComNet-Senges
2006	Germany	Elnathan Heizmann	Team Regiostrom-Senges
2007	Netherlands	Marcel Beima	Time-Van Hemert
2008	Netherlands	Bram Schmitz	Van Vliet EBH Elshof
2009	Germany	Dennis Pohl	Team Kuota-Indeland
2010	Germany	Sven Krauss	Halanke.de-Öschelbronn
