= 2000 Clásica de Almería =

Race details
- Dates: 27 February 2000
- Stages: 1
- Distance: 176 km (109.4 mi)
- Winning time: 4h 36' 51"

Results
	Winner	Isaac Gálvez (ESP)
	Second	Ján Svorada (CZE)
	Third	Markus Zberg (SUI)

The 2000 Clásica de Almería was the 15th edition of the Clásica de Almería cycle race and was held on 27 February 2000. The race started in Puebla de Vícar and finished in Vera. The race was won by Isaac Gálvez.

== General classification ==
Final general classification

Rank	Rider	Time
1	Isaac Gálvez (ESP)	4h 36' 51"
2	Ján Svorada (CZE)	+ 0"
3	Markus Zberg (SUI)	+ 0"
4	Endrio Leoni (ITA)	+ 0"
5	Flavio Zandarin (ITA)	+ 0"
6	Fabiano Fontanelli (ITA)	+ 0"
7	Erik Dekker (NED)	+ 0"
8	Jeroen Blijlevens (NED)	+ 0"
9	Igor Flores (ESP)	+ 0"
10	Jürgen Werner (GER)	+ 0"
