= Jens Zemke =

German cyclist (born 1966)

Personal information
- Born: 17 October 1966 (age 59) Wiesbaden, West Germany

Cycling career
- Sport: Cycling
- Discipline: Road
- Role: Rider; Directeur sportif

Professional teams
- 1995: Collstrop–Lystex
- 1996–2001: Team Nürnberger

Managerial teams
- 2002–2008: Equipe Nürnberger Versicherung
- 2009–2010: Cervélo TestTeam
- 2011: HTC–Highroad Women
- 2012–2016: MTN–Qhubeka
- 2017–: Bora–Hansgrohe

Jens Zemke (born 17 October 1966) is a German former racing cyclist. In 1999 he won the Hessen-Rundfahrt. In October 2016 Bora–Hansgrohe announced that had been appointed as a directeur sportif.

== Major results ==
1992
1st Stage 2 Bayern Rundfahrt
1993
2nd Overall Bayern Rundfahrt
1994
1st Stage 2 Bayern Rundfahrt
2nd Overall Thüringen Rundfahrt der U23
3rd Overall Tour du Vaucluse
1995
5th Tour du Haut Var
1996
2nd Rund um Düren
1998
1st Stage 11 Commonwealth Bank Classic
1999
1st Overall Hessen-Rundfahrt

1st Stage 5b (ITT)

1st Rund um die Nürnberger Altstadt
8th Overall Rheinland-Pfalz Rundfahrt
2000
8th Rund um Düren
2001
9th Overall Hessen-Rundfahrt
10th Overall Rheinland-Pfalz Rundfahrt
