= Jürgen Werner (cyclist) =

German cyclist

Personal information
- Born: 20 July 1970 (age 56) Zwickau, East Germany

Cycling career
- Sport: Cycling
- Current team: Retired
- Discipline: Road
- Role: Rider

Professional teams
- 1994–1996: Team Telekom
- 1997: Refin–Mobilvetta
- 1998: Agro–Adler Brandenburg
- 1999–2002: Team Nürnberger

Jürgen Werner (born 20 July 1970) is a German former racing cyclist, who competed as a professional from 1994 to 2002.

== Major results ==
1990
1st Prologue Tour of Norway
1991
1st Stage 12 Vuelta y Ruta de Mexico
1992
1st Stages 3 & 8 Bayern Rundfahrt
1993
1st Stage 6 Bayern Rundfahrt
1994
1st Stage 10 Vuelta y Ruta de Mexico
1995
1st Rund um Sebnitz
4th Paris–Tours
1998
1st Stage 6 Peace Race
2nd Coca-Cola Trophy
3rd Overall Sachsen-Tour
3rd Overall Vuelta a la Independencia Nacional
1999
5th Overall Niedersachsen-Rundfahrt

1st Stage 6

6th Overall Ster der Beloften
10th HEW Cyclassics
2000
1st Rund um Düren
4th GP Aarhus
9th Grand Prix Midtbank
10th Clásica de Almería
2001
5th Groningen–Münster
8th GP Stad Zottegem
9th Rund um Köln
9th Ronde van Noord-Holland
2002
Bayern Rundfahrt

1st Mountains classification
1st Points classification

1st Prologue Jadranska Magistrala
3rd Overall Sachsen-Tour

1st Stage 4 (ITT)

=== Grand Tour general classification results timeline ===
Grand Tour	1994	1995	1996	1997
Giro d'Italia	99	115	—	DNF
Tour de France	—	—	—	—
Vuelta a España	—	—	67	103

Legend
—	Did not compete
DNF	Did not finish
