= 3-Länder-Tour =

Road bicycle race in Germany

Race details
- Date: Mid September
- Region: Central Germany
- English name: Three Länder Tour of Sparkassen Versicherung
- Local name(s): 3-Länder-Tour der Sparkassen Versicherung (in German)
- Discipline: Road
- Competition: UCI Europe Tour
- Type: Stage race

History
- First edition: 1982
- Editions: 26
- Final edition: 2007
- First winner: Thomas Freienstein (GER)
- Final winner: Thomas Dekker (NED)

The 3-Länder-Tour der Sparkassen Versicherung was a multi-stage road bicycle race held around three Länder of Germany: Hessen, Thuringia and Baden-Württemberg. From 2005 until 2007 it was part of the UCI Europe Tour, being organised as a 2.1 race.

The race was previously known as Hessen-Rundfahrt, taking place in the Bundesland of Hessen, but in 2006 it expanded its territory to take place in the states of Thuringia and Baden-Württemberg.

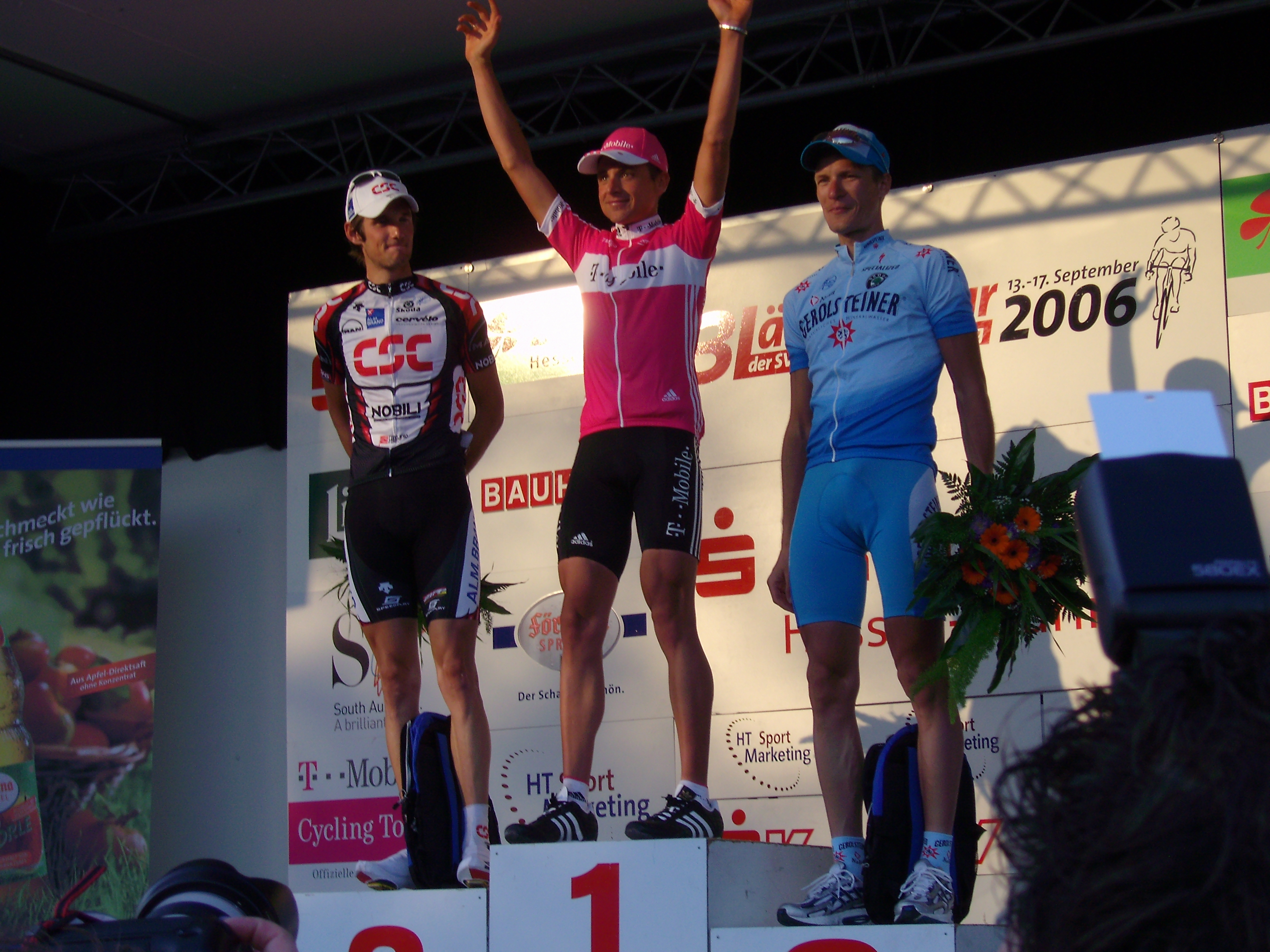
Winners' podium at Stage 1 of the 2006 3-Länder-Tour in Kassel

== Winners ==
Year	Country	Rider	Team
1982	West Germany	Thomas Freienstein	
1983	Czechoslovakia	Ludek Kubias	
1984	West Germany	Thomas Freienstein	
1985	West Germany	Hartmut Bölts	
1986	West Germany	Christian Henn	
1987	East Germany	Jens Heppner	SG Wismut Gera
1988	Soviet Union	Pavel Tonkov	
1989	Great Britain	Matthew Stephens	Hemel Hempstead CC
1990	France	Christophe Capelle	
1991	New Zealand	Brian Fowler	
1992	Germany	Bert Dietz	
1993	Germany	Ralf Schmidt	
1994	Czech Republic	Pavel Padrnos	
1995	Czech Republic	Pavel Padrnos	
1996	Germany	Ralf Grabsch	PSV Köln
1997	Germany	Christian Henn	Team Telekom
1998	Germany	Grischa Niermann	Die Continentale
1999	Germany	Jens Zemke	Team Nürnberger
2000	Germany	Tobias Steinhauser	Gerolsteiner
2001	Denmark	Michael Blaudzun	CSC–Tiscali
2002	Germany	Uwe Peschel	Gerolsteiner
2003	France	Cédric Vasseur	Cofidis
2004	Germany	Sebastian Lang	Gerolsteiner
2005	Poland	Cezary Zamana	Action–Ati
2006	Germany	Sebastian Lang	Gerolsteiner
2007	Netherlands	Thomas Dekker	Rabobank
