= Thomas Freienstein =

German cyclist (1960–2026)

Personal information
- Born: 9 March 1960 Fulda, Hesse, West Germany
- Died: 19 August 2026 (aged 66)

Cycling career
- Sport: Cycling

Thomas Freienstein (9 March 1960 – 19 August 2026) was a German cyclist. He won the Hessen-Rundfahrt in 1982 and 1984. He competed in the individual road race and the team time trial events at the 1984 Summer Olympics. Freienstein died on 19 August 2026, at the age of 66.
