= 2019 Giro d'Italia, Stage 1 to Stage 11 =

Cycling race stages

The 2019 Giro d'Italia is the 102nd edition of the Giro d'Italia, one of cycling's Grand Tours. The Giro began in Bologna with an individual time trial on 11 May, and Stage 11 occurred on 22 May with a stage to Novi Ligure. The race will finish in Verona on 2 June.

== Stage 1 ==
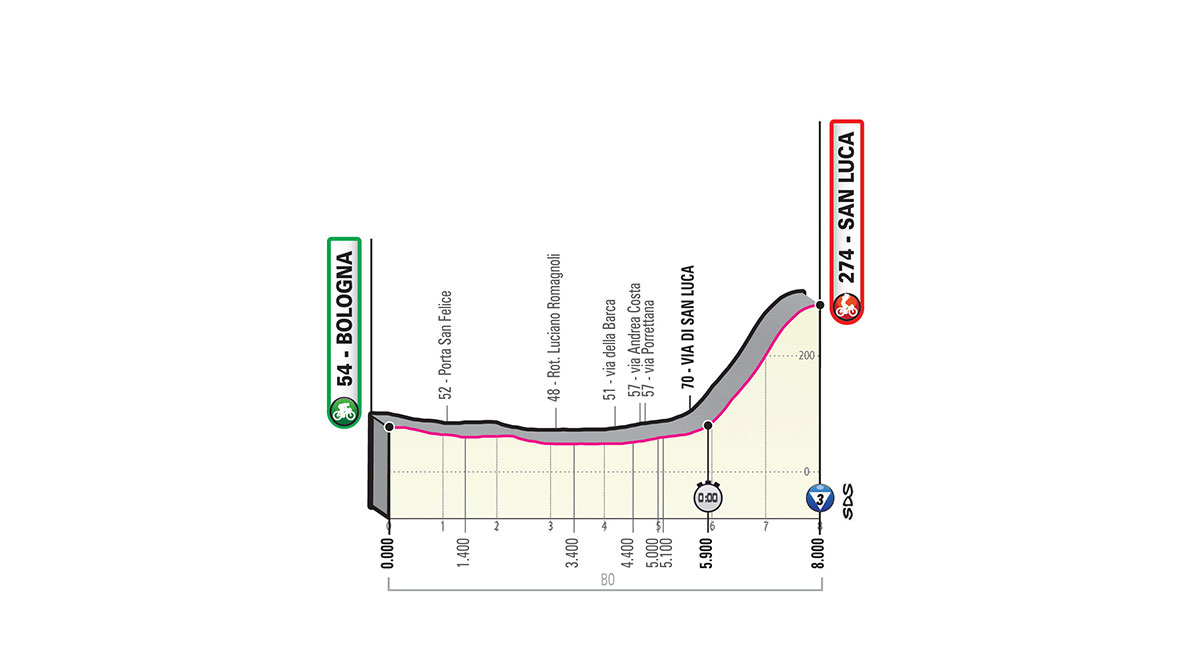

11 May 2019 – Bologna to Bologna (San Luca), 8 km (5.0 mi) (ITT)

The first rider departed at 16:50 CEST (UTC+02:00). The route started on the Via F. Rizzoli, heading west for the first half of the course. The riders then turned back east for 2 km (1.2 mi), to the timecheck at the Via di San Luca. The course then headed southwest on a 2.1-kilometre-long (1.3 mi) category 3 climb, with a 9.7% average gradient, to the finish line.

The stage was won by Primož Roglič (Visma–Lease a Bike) who therefore became the first wearer of the maglia rosa, the pink jersey identifying the leader of the general classification. Roglič also took the lead in the points classification. Giulio Ciccone (Lidl–Trek) took the lead in the mountains classification and became the first wearer of the blue jersey, while Miguel Ángel López (XDS Astana Team) finished as the fastest young rider and became the leader of the young rider classification.

Stage 1 result and general classification after stage 1
Rank	Rider	Team	Time
1	Primož Roglič (SLO)	Team Jumbo–Visma	12' 54"
2	Simon Yates (GBR)	Mitchelton–Scott	+ 19"
3	Vincenzo Nibali (ITA)	Bahrain–Merida	+ 23"
4	Miguel Ángel López (COL)	Astana	+ 28"
5	Tom Dumoulin (NED)	Team Sunweb	+ 28"
6	Rafał Majka (POL)	Bora–Hansgrohe	+ 33"
7	Tao Geoghegan Hart (GBR)	Team INEOS	+ 35"
8	Laurens De Plus (BEL)	Team Jumbo–Visma	+ 35"
9	Bauke Mollema (NED)	Trek–Segafredo	+ 39"
10	Damiano Caruso (ITA)	Bahrain–Merida	+ 40"

== Stage 2 ==
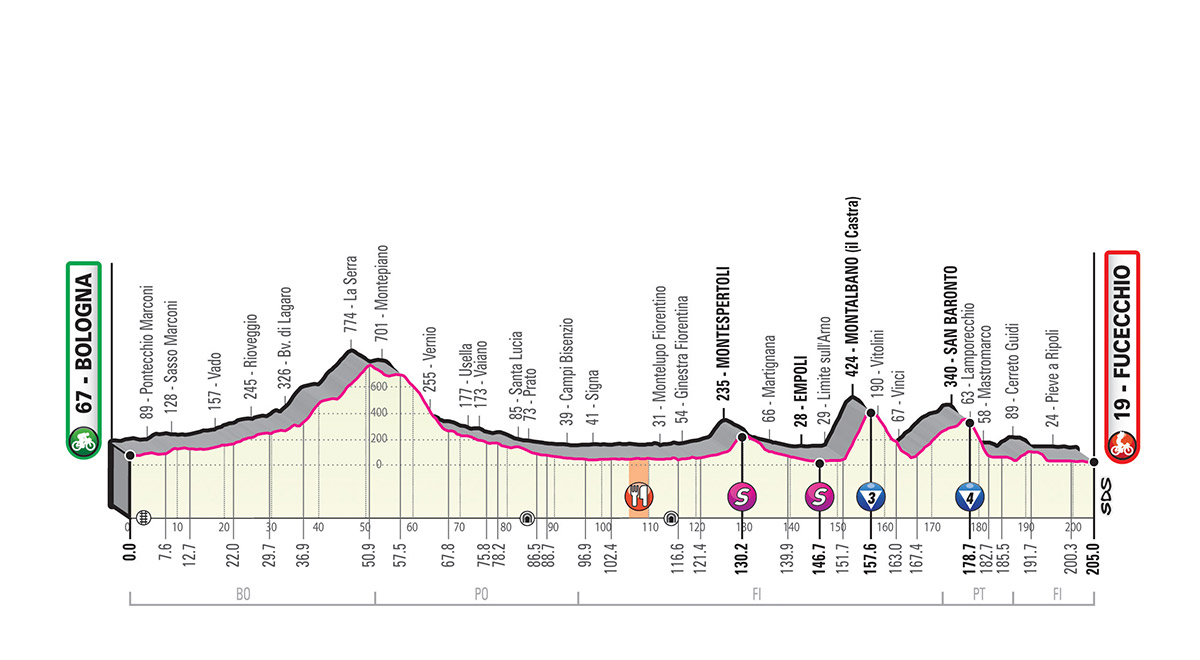

12 May 2019 – Bologna to Fucecchio, 200 km (120 mi)

Stage 2 result
Rank	Rider	Team	Time
1	Pascal Ackermann (GER)	Bora–Hansgrohe	4h 44' 43"
2	Elia Viviani (ITA)	Deceuninck–Quick-Step	+ 0"
3	Caleb Ewan (AUS)	Lotto–Soudal	+ 0"
4	Fernando Gaviria (COL)	UAE Team Emirates	+ 0"
5	Arnaud Démare (FRA)	Groupama–FDJ	+ 0"
6	Davide Cimolai (ITA)	Israel Cycling Academy	+ 0"
7	Viacheslav Kuznetsov (RUS)	Team Katusha–Alpecin	+ 0"
8	Jasper De Buyst (BEL)	Lotto–Soudal	+ 0"
9	Kristian Sbaragli (ITA)	Israel Cycling Academy	+ 0"
10	Rüdiger Selig (GER)	Bora–Hansgrohe	+ 0"

General classification after stage 2
Rank	Rider	Team	Time
1	Primož Roglič (SLO)	Team Jumbo–Visma	4h 57' 42"
2	Simon Yates (GBR)	Mitchelton–Scott	+ 19"
3	Vincenzo Nibali (ITA)	Bahrain–Merida	+ 23"
4	Miguel Ángel López (COL)	Astana	+ 28"
5	Tom Dumoulin (NED)	Team Sunweb	+ 28"
6	Rafał Majka (POL)	Bora–Hansgrohe	+ 33"
7	Tao Geoghegan Hart (GBR)	Team INEOS	+ 35"
8	Bauke Mollema (NED)	Trek–Segafredo	+ 39"
9	Damiano Caruso (ITA)	Bahrain–Merida	+ 40"
10	Pello Bilbao (ESP)	Astana	+ 42"

== Stage 3 ==
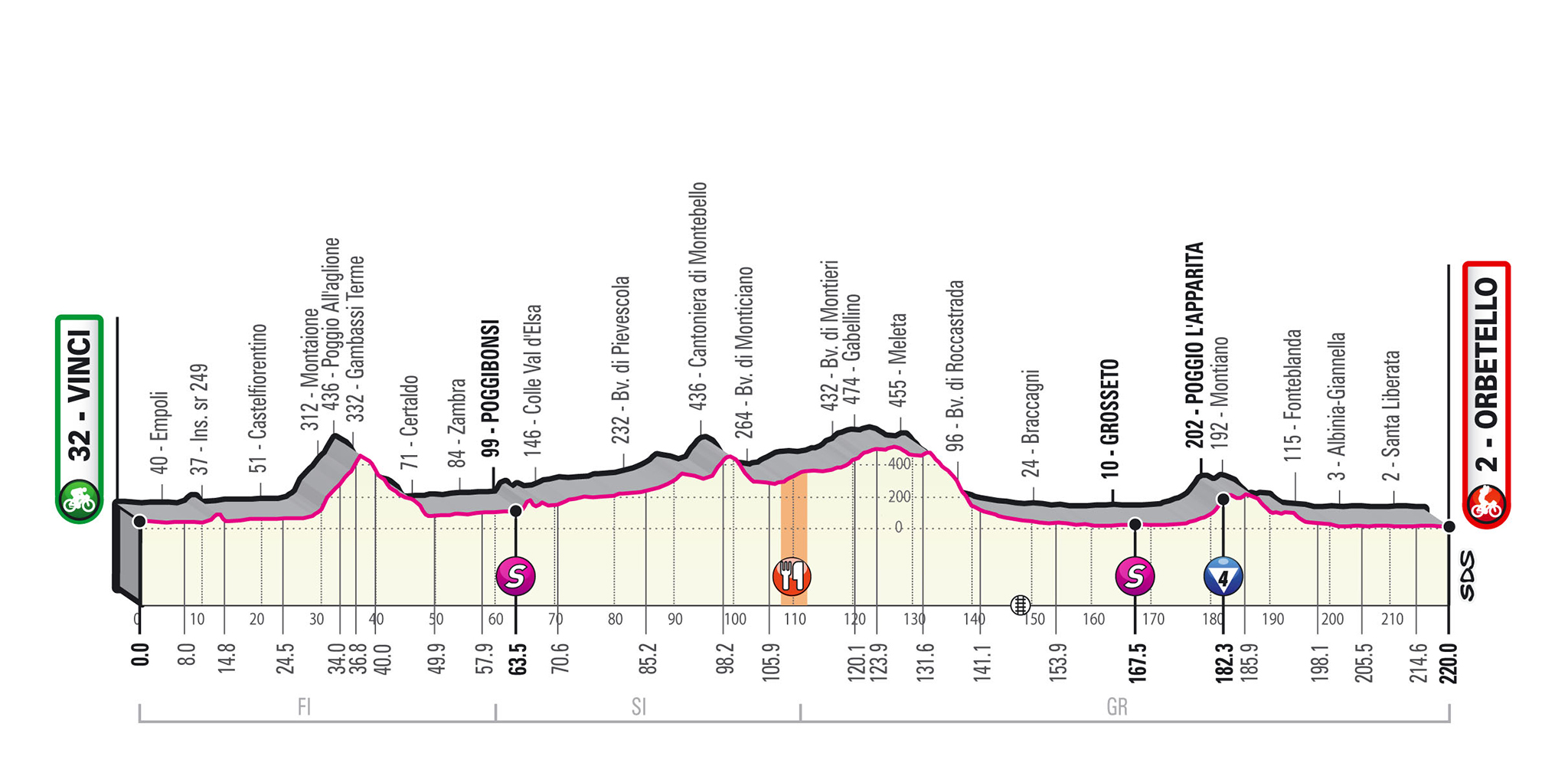

13 May 2019 – Vinci to Orbetello, 219 km (136 mi)

Elia Viviani from Deceuninck–Quick-Step crossed the line first, but was relegated by the jury due to moving from his racing line during the final sprint, therefore Fernando Gaviria, who crossed the line second, is the winner of the stage.

Stage 3 result
Rank	Rider	Team	Time
1	Fernando Gaviria (COL)	UAE Team Emirates	5h 23' 19"
2	Arnaud Démare (FRA)	Groupama–FDJ	+ 0"
3	Pascal Ackermann (GER)	Bora–Hansgrohe	+ 0"
4	Matteo Moschetti (ITA)	Trek–Segafredo	+ 0"
5	Giacomo Nizzolo (ITA)	Team Dimension Data	+ 0"
6	Jakub Mareczko (ITA)	CCC Team	+ 0"
7	Davide Cimolai (ITA)	Israel Cycling Academy	+ 0"
8	Manuel Belletti (ITA)	Androni Giocattoli–Sidermec	+ 0"
9	Christian Knees (GER)	Team INEOS	+ 0"
10	Sacha Modolo (ITA)	EF Education First	+ 0"

General classification after stage 3
Rank	Rider	Team	Time
1	Primož Roglič (SLO)	Team Jumbo–Visma	10h 21' 01"
2	Simon Yates (GBR)	Mitchelton–Scott	+ 19"
3	Vincenzo Nibali (ITA)	Bahrain–Merida	+ 23"
4	Miguel Ángel López (COL)	Astana	+ 28"
5	Tom Dumoulin (NED)	Team Sunweb	+ 28"
6	Rafał Majka (POL)	Bora–Hansgrohe	+ 33"
7	Bauke Mollema (NED)	Trek–Segafredo	+ 39"
8	Damiano Caruso (ITA)	Bahrain–Merida	+ 40"
9	Pello Bilbao (ESP)	Astana	+ 42"
10	Víctor de la Parte (ESP)	CCC Team	+ 45"

== Stage 4 ==
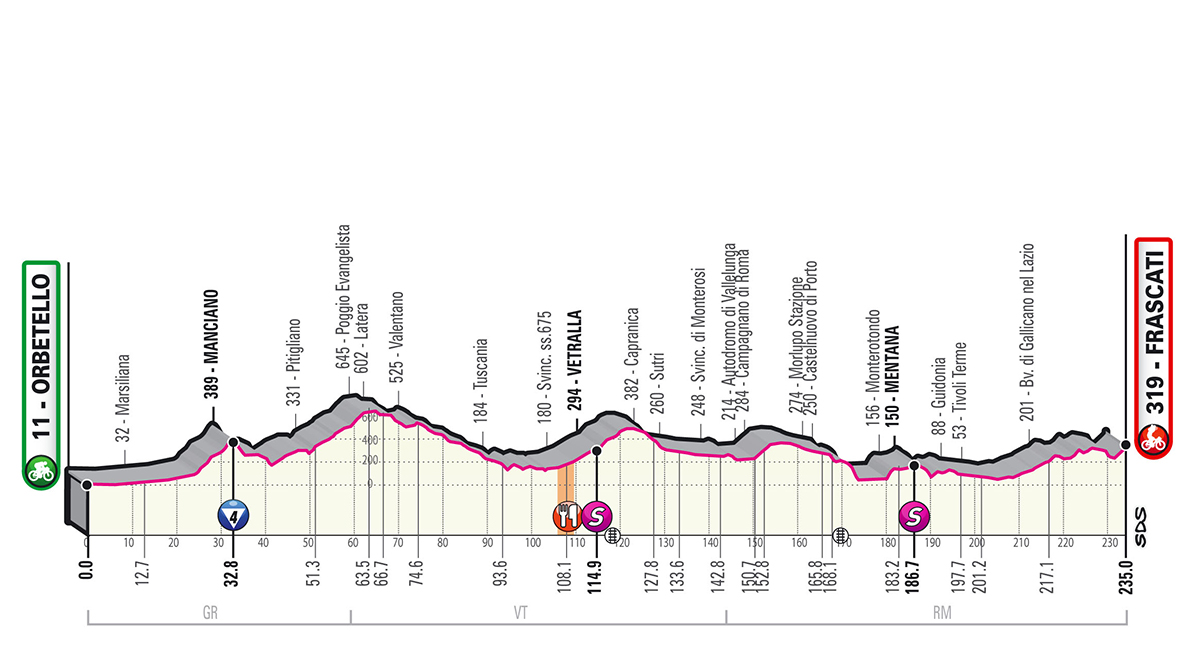

14 May 2019 – Orbetello to Frascati, 228 km (142 mi)

Stage 4 result
Rank	Rider	Team	Time
1	Richard Carapaz (ECU)	Movistar Team	5h 58' 17"
2	Caleb Ewan (AUS)	Lotto–Soudal	+ 0"
3	Diego Ulissi (ITA)	UAE Team Emirates	+ 0"
4	Pascal Ackermann (GER)	Bora–Hansgrohe	+ 2"
5	Florian Sénéchal (FRA)	Deceuninck–Quick-Step	+ 2"
6	Primož Roglič (SLO)	Team Jumbo–Visma	+ 2"
7	Valerio Conti (ITA)	UAE Team Emirates	+ 14"
8	Miguel Ángel López (COL)	Astana	+ 18"
9	Arnaud Démare (FRA)	Groupama–FDJ	+ 18"
10	Simon Yates (GBR)	Mitchelton–Scott	+ 18"

General classification after stage 4
Rank	Rider	Team	Time
1	Primož Roglič (SLO)	Team Jumbo–Visma	16h 19' 20"
2	Simon Yates (GBR)	Mitchelton–Scott	+ 35"
3	Vincenzo Nibali (ITA)	Bahrain–Merida	+ 39"
4	Miguel Ángel López (COL)	Astana	+ 44"
5	Diego Ulissi (ITA)	UAE Team Emirates	+ 44"
6	Rafał Majka (POL)	Bora–Hansgrohe	+ 49"
7	Bauke Mollema (NED)	Trek–Segafredo	+ 55"
8	Damiano Caruso (ITA)	Bahrain–Merida	+ 56"
9	Bob Jungels (LUX)	Deceuninck–Quick-Step	+ 1' 02"
10	Davide Formolo (ITA)	Bora–Hansgrohe	+ 1' 06"

== Stage 5 ==
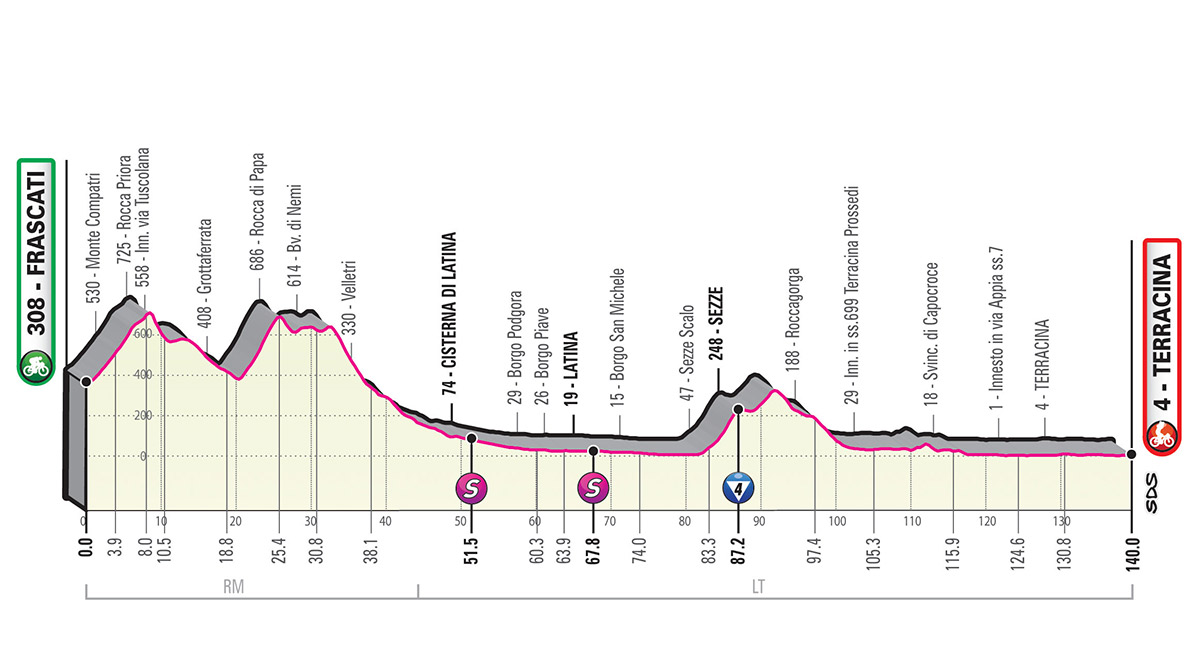

15 May 2019 – Frascati to Terracina, 140 km (87 mi)

Tom Dumoulin, the 2017 winner and one of the race favourites, withdrew in the stage's neutral zone. He had suffered a knee injury in a crash on the previous stage.

Stage 5 result
Rank	Rider	Team	Time
1	Pascal Ackermann (GER)	Bora–Hansgrohe	3h 27' 05"
2	Fernando Gaviria (COL)	UAE Team Emirates	+ 0"
3	Arnaud Démare (FRA)	Groupama–FDJ	+ 0"
4	Caleb Ewan (AUS)	Lotto–Soudal	+ 0"
5	Matteo Moschetti (ITA)	Trek–Segafredo	+ 0"
6	Ryan Gibbons (SAF)	Team Dimension Data	+ 0"
7	Paolo Simion (ITA)	Bardiani–CSF	+ 0"
8	Jenthe Biermans (BEL)	Team Katusha–Alpecin	+ 0"
9	Giovanni Lonardi (ITA)	Nippo–Vini Fantini–Faizanè	+ 0"
10	Manuel Belletti (ITA)	Androni Giocattoli–Sidermec	+ 0"

General classification after stage 5
Rank	Rider	Team	Time
1	Primož Roglič (SLO)	Team Jumbo–Visma	19h 46' 25"
2	Simon Yates (GBR)	Mitchelton–Scott	+ 35"
3	Vincenzo Nibali (ITA)	Bahrain–Merida	+ 39"
4	Miguel Ángel López (COL)	Astana	+ 44"
5	Diego Ulissi (ITA)	UAE Team Emirates	+ 44"
6	Rafał Majka (POL)	Bora–Hansgrohe	+ 49"
7	Bauke Mollema (NED)	Trek–Segafredo	+ 55"
8	Damiano Caruso (ITA)	Bahrain–Merida	+ 56"
9	Bob Jungels (LUX)	Deceuninck–Quick-Step	+ 1' 02"
10	Davide Formolo (ITA)	Bora–Hansgrohe	+ 1' 06"

== Stage 6 ==
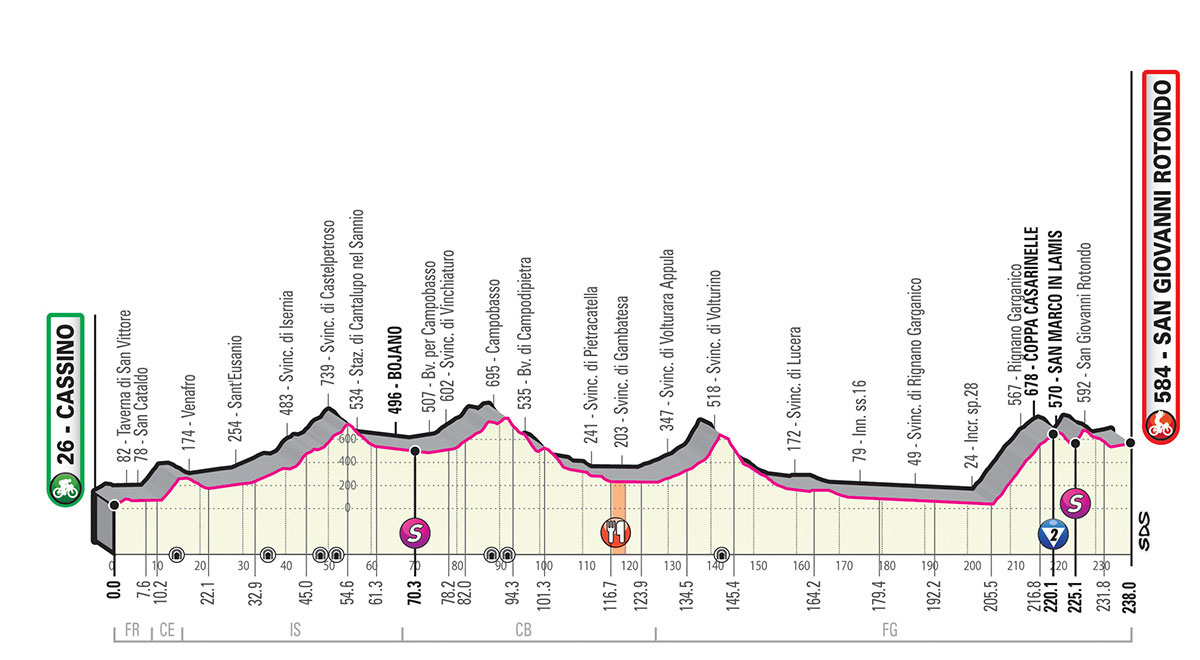

16 May 2019 – Cassino to San Giovanni Rotondo, 233 km (145 mi)

Stage 6 result
Rank	Rider	Team	Time
1	Fausto Masnada (ITA)	Androni Giocattoli–Sidermec	5h 45' 01"
2	Valerio Conti (ITA)	UAE Team Emirates	+ 5"
3	José Joaquín Rojas (ESP)	Movistar Team	+ 38"
4	Rubén Plaza (ESP)	Israel Cycling Academy	+ 38"
5	Giovanni Carboni (ITA)	Bardiani–CSF	+ 43"
6	Pieter Serry (BEL)	Deceuninck–Quick-Step	+ 54"
7	Valentin Madouas (FRA)	Groupama–FDJ	+ 54"
8	Nans Peters (FRA)	AG2R La Mondiale	+ 57"
9	Andrey Amador (CRC)	Movistar Team	+ 57"
10	Amaro Antunes (PRT)	CCC Team	+ 57"

General classification after stage 6
Rank	Rider	Team	Time
1	Valerio Conti (ITA)	UAE Team Emirates	25h 22' 00"
2	Giovanni Carboni (ITA)	Bardiani–CSF	+ 1' 41"
3	Nans Peters (FRA)	AG2R La Mondiale	+ 2' 09"
4	José Joaquín Rojas (ESP)	Movistar Team	+ 2' 12"
5	Valentin Madouas (FRA)	Groupama–FDJ	+ 2' 19"
6	Amaro Antunes (PRT)	CCC Team	+ 2' 45"
7	Fausto Masnada (ITA)	Androni Giocattoli–Sidermec	+ 3' 14"
8	Pieter Serry (BEL)	Deceuninck–Quick-Step	+ 3' 25"
9	Andrey Amador (CRC)	Movistar Team	+ 3' 27"
10	Sam Oomen (NED)	Team Sunweb	+ 4' 57"

== Stage 7 ==
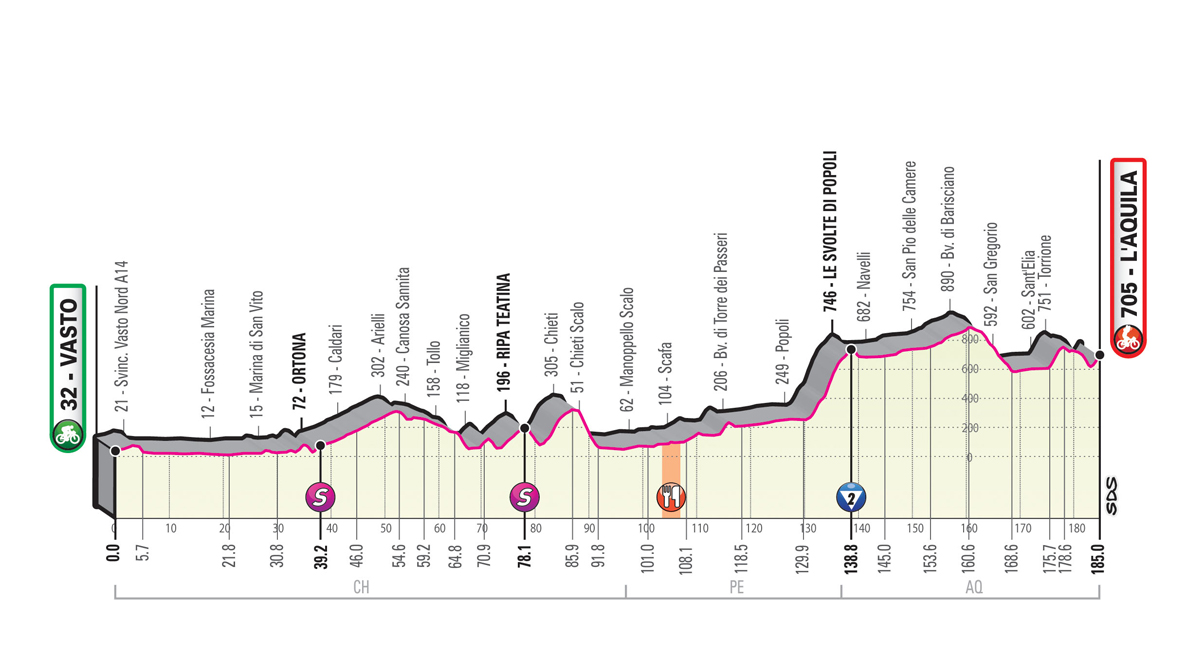

17 May 2019 – Vasto to L'Aquila, 180 km (110 mi)

Stage 7 result
Rank	Rider	Team	Time
1	Pello Bilbao (ESP)	Astana	4h 06' 27"
2	Tony Gallopin (FRA)	AG2R La Mondiale	+ 5"
3	Davide Formolo (ITA)	Bora–Hansgrohe	+ 5"
4	Lucas Hamilton (AUS)	Mitchelton–Scott	+ 9"
5	Mattia Cattaneo (ITA)	Androni Giocattoli–Sidermec	+ 9"
6	José Joaquín Rojas (ESP)	Movistar Team	+ 30"
7	Sebastián Henao (COL)	Team INEOS	+ 48"
8	Antonio Pedrero (ESP)	Movistar Team	+ 1' 01"
9	Valentin Madouas (FRA)	Groupama–FDJ	+ 1' 07"
10	Andrea Vendrame (ITA)	Androni Giocattoli–Sidermec	+ 1' 07"

General classification after stage 7
Rank	Rider	Team	Time
1	Valerio Conti (ITA)	UAE Team Emirates	29h 29' 34"
2	José Joaquín Rojas (ESP)	Movistar Team	+ 1' 32"
3	Giovanni Carboni (ITA)	Bardiani–CSF	+ 1' 41"
4	Nans Peters (FRA)	AG2R La Mondiale	+ 2' 09"
5	Valentin Madouas (FRA)	Groupama–FDJ	+ 2' 17"
6	Amaro Antunes (PRT)	CCC Team	+ 2' 45"
7	Fausto Masnada (ITA)	Androni Giocattoli–Sidermec	+ 3' 14"
8	Pieter Serry (BEL)	Deceuninck–Quick-Step	+ 3' 25"
9	Andrey Amador (CRC)	Movistar Team	+ 3' 27"
10	Sam Oomen (NED)	Team Sunweb	+ 4' 57"

== Stage 8 ==
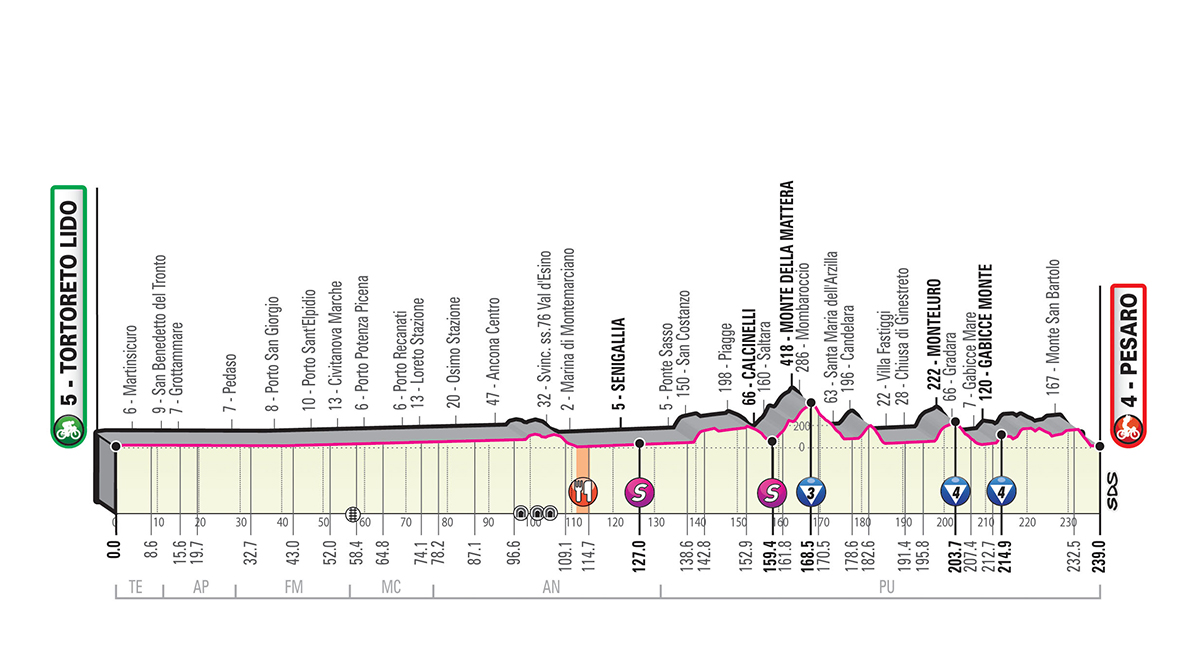

18 May 2019 – Tortoreto Lido to Pesaro, 235 km (146 mi)

Stage 8 result
Rank	Rider	Team	Time
1	Caleb Ewan (AUS)	Lotto–Soudal	5h 43' 32"
2	Elia Viviani (ITA)	Deceuninck–Quick-Step	+ 0"
3	Pascal Ackermann (GER)	Bora–Hansgrohe	+ 0"
4	Fabio Sabatini (ITA)	Deceuninck–Quick-Step	+ 0"
5	Manuel Belletti (ITA)	Androni Giocattoli–Sidermec	+ 0"
6	Arnaud Démare (FRA)	Groupama–FDJ	+ 0"
7	Davide Cimolai (ITA)	Israel Cycling Academy	+ 0"
8	Marco Canola (ITA)	Nippo–Vini Fantini–Faizanè	+ 0"
9	Giacomo Nizzolo (ITA)	Team Dimension Data	+ 0"
10	Rüdiger Selig (GER)	Bora–Hansgrohe	+ 0"

General classification after stage 8
Rank	Rider	Team	Time
1	Valerio Conti (ITA)	UAE Team Emirates	35h 13' 06"
2	José Joaquín Rojas (ESP)	Movistar Team	+ 1' 32"
3	Giovanni Carboni (ITA)	Bardiani–CSF	+ 1' 41"
4	Nans Peters (FRA)	AG2R La Mondiale	+ 2' 09"
5	Valentin Madouas (FRA)	Groupama–FDJ	+ 2' 17"
6	Amaro Antunes (PRT)	CCC Team	+ 2' 45"
7	Fausto Masnada (ITA)	Androni Giocattoli–Sidermec	+ 3' 14"
8	Pieter Serry (BEL)	Deceuninck–Quick-Step	+ 3' 25"
9	Andrey Amador (CRC)	Movistar Team	+ 3' 27"
10	Sam Oomen (NED)	Team Sunweb	+ 4' 57"

== Stage 9 ==
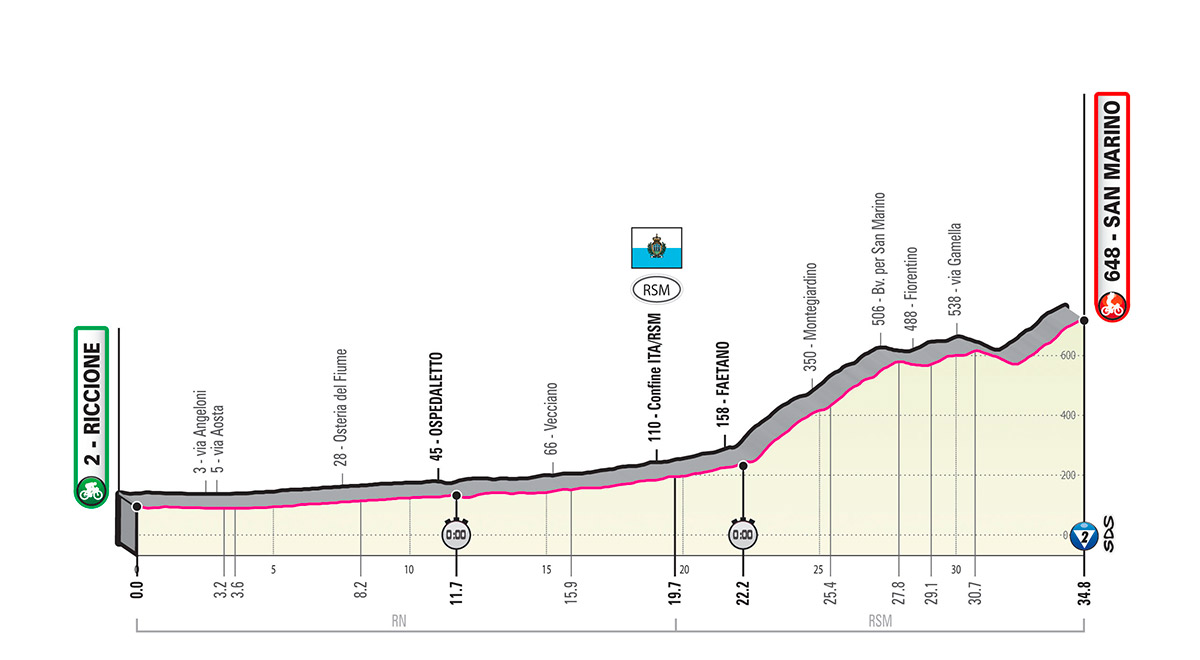

19 May 2019 – Riccione to San Marino (San Marino), 34.7 km (21.6 mi) (ITT)

Stage 9 result
Rank	Rider	Team	Time
1	Primož Roglič (SLO)	Team Jumbo–Visma	51' 52"
2	Victor Campenaerts (BEL)	Lotto–Soudal	+ 11"
3	Bauke Mollema (NED)	Trek–Segafredo	+ 1' 00"
4	Vincenzo Nibali (ITA)	Bahrain–Merida	+ 1' 05"
5	Tanel Kangert (EST)	EF Education First	+ 1' 10"
6	Chad Haga (USA)	Team Sunweb	+ 1' 14"
7	Bob Jungels (LUX)	Deceuninck–Quick-Step	+ 1' 16"
8	Hugh Carthy (GBR)	EF Education First	+ 1' 30"
9	Pello Bilbao (ESP)	Astana	+ 1' 43"
10	Mattia Cattaneo (ITA)	Androni Giocattoli–Sidermec	+ 1' 52"

General classification after stage 9
Rank	Rider	Team	Time
1	Valerio Conti (ITA)	UAE Team Emirates	36h 08' 32"
2	Primož Roglič (SLO)	Team Jumbo–Visma	+ 1' 50"
3	Nans Peters (FRA)	AG2R La Mondiale	+ 2' 21"
4	José Joaquín Rojas (ESP)	Movistar Team	+ 2' 33"
5	Fausto Masnada (ITA)	Androni Giocattoli–Sidermec	+ 2' 36"
6	Andrey Amador (CRC)	Movistar Team	+ 2' 39"
7	Amaro Antunes (PRT)	CCC Team	+ 3' 05"
8	Valentin Madouas (FRA)	Groupama–FDJ	+ 3' 27"
9	Giovanni Carboni (ITA)	Bardiani–CSF	+ 3' 30"
10	Pello Bilbao (ESP)	Astana	+ 3' 32"

== Stage 10 ==
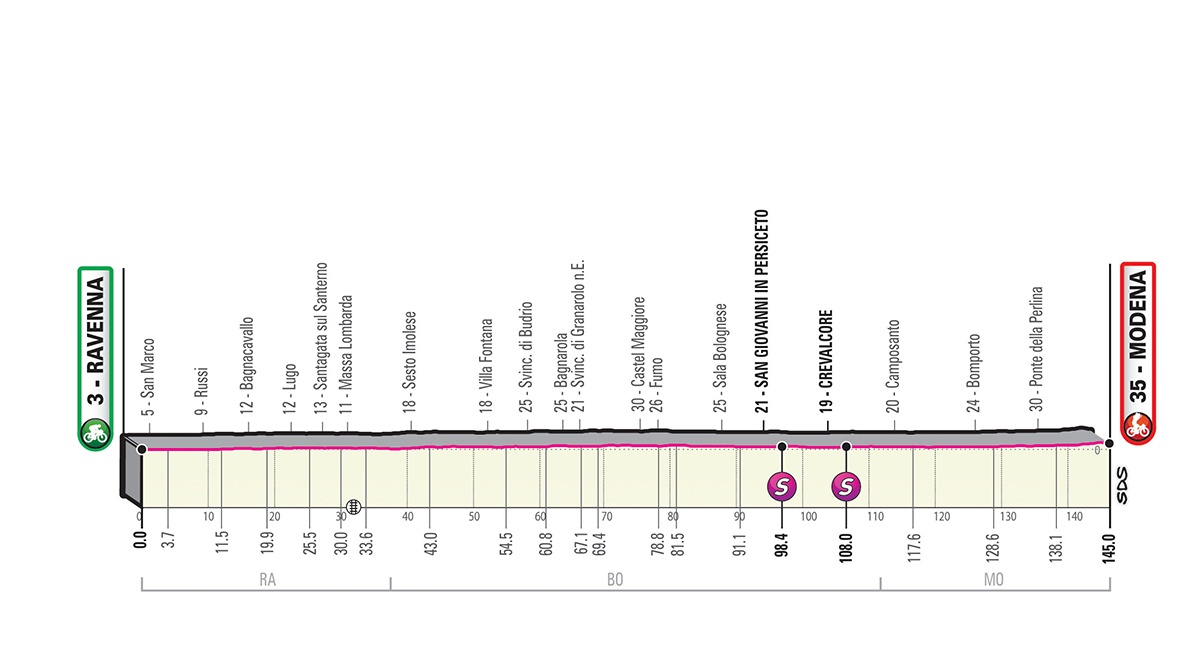

21 May 2019 – Ravenna to Modena, 147 km (91 mi)

Stage 10 result
Rank	Rider	Team	Time
1	Arnaud Démare (FRA)	Groupama–FDJ	3h 36' 07"
2	Elia Viviani (ITA)	Deceuninck–Quick-Step	+ 0"
3	Rüdiger Selig (GER)	Bora–Hansgrohe	+ 0"
4	Caleb Ewan (AUS)	Lotto–Soudal	+ 0"
5	Giacomo Nizzolo (ITA)	Team Dimension Data	+ 0"
6	Davide Cimolai (ITA)	Israel Cycling Academy	+ 0"
7	Manuel Belletti (ITA)	Androni Giocattoli–Sidermec	+ 0"
8	Giovanni Lonardi (ITA)	Nippo–Vini Fantini–Faizanè	+ 0"
9	Jasper De Buyst (BEL)	Lotto–Soudal	+ 0"
10	Jacopo Guarnieri (ITA)	Groupama–FDJ	+ 0"

General classification after stage 10
Rank	Rider	Team	Time
1	Valerio Conti (ITA)	UAE Team Emirates	39h 44' 39"
2	Primož Roglič (SLO)	Team Jumbo–Visma	+ 1' 50"
3	Nans Peters (FRA)	AG2R La Mondiale	+ 2' 21"
4	José Joaquín Rojas (ESP)	Movistar Team	+ 2' 33"
5	Fausto Masnada (ITA)	Androni Giocattoli–Sidermec	+ 2' 36"
6	Andrey Amador (CRC)	Movistar Team	+ 2' 39"
7	Amaro Antunes (PRT)	CCC Team	+ 3' 05"
8	Valentin Madouas (FRA)	Groupama–FDJ	+ 3' 27"
9	Giovanni Carboni (ITA)	Bardiani–CSF	+ 3' 30"
10	Pello Bilbao (ESP)	Astana	+ 3' 32"

== Stage 11 ==
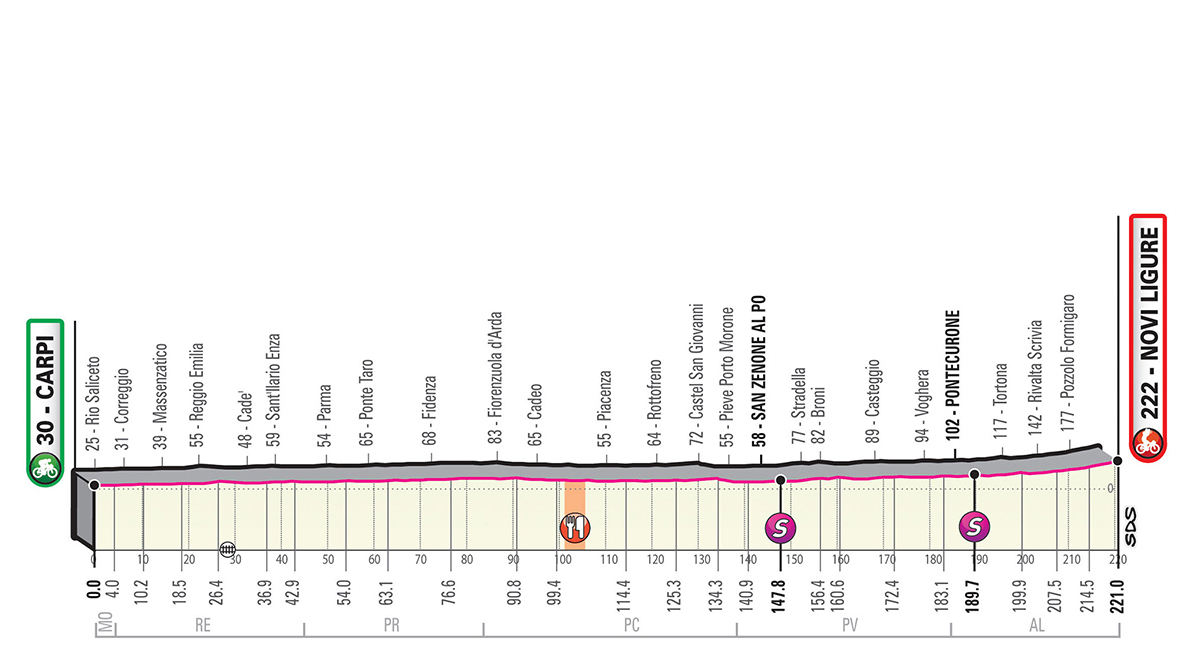

22 May 2019 – Carpi to Novi Ligure, 206 km (128 mi)

Stage 11 result
Rank	Rider	Team	Time
1	Caleb Ewan (AUS)	Lotto–Soudal	5h 17' 26"
2	Arnaud Démare (FRA)	Groupama–FDJ	+ 0"
3	Pascal Ackermann (GER)	Bora–Hansgrohe	+ 0"
4	Elia Viviani (ITA)	Deceuninck–Quick-Step	+ 0"
5	Davide Cimolai (ITA)	Israel Cycling Academy	+ 0"
6	Simone Consonni (ITA)	UAE Team Emirates	+ 0"
7	Ryan Gibbons (SAF)	Team Dimension Data	+ 0"
8	Giacomo Nizzolo (ITA)	Team Dimension Data	+ 0"
9	Jakub Mareczko (ITA)	CCC Team	+ 0"
10	Sean Bennett (USA)	EF Education First	+ 0"

General classification after stage 11
Rank	Rider	Team	Time
1	Valerio Conti (ITA)	UAE Team Emirates	45h 02' 05"
2	Primož Roglič (SLO)	Team Jumbo–Visma	+ 1' 50"
3	Nans Peters (FRA)	AG2R La Mondiale	+ 2' 21"
4	José Joaquín Rojas (ESP)	Movistar Team	+ 2' 33"
5	Fausto Masnada (ITA)	Androni Giocattoli–Sidermec	+ 2' 36"
6	Andrey Amador (CRC)	Movistar Team	+ 2' 39"
7	Amaro Antunes (PRT)	CCC Team	+ 3' 05"
8	Valentin Madouas (FRA)	Groupama–FDJ	+ 3' 27"
9	Giovanni Carboni (ITA)	Bardiani–CSF	+ 3' 30"
10	Pello Bilbao (ESP)	Astana	+ 3' 32"
