= Umberto Orsini (cyclist) =

Italian racing cyclist

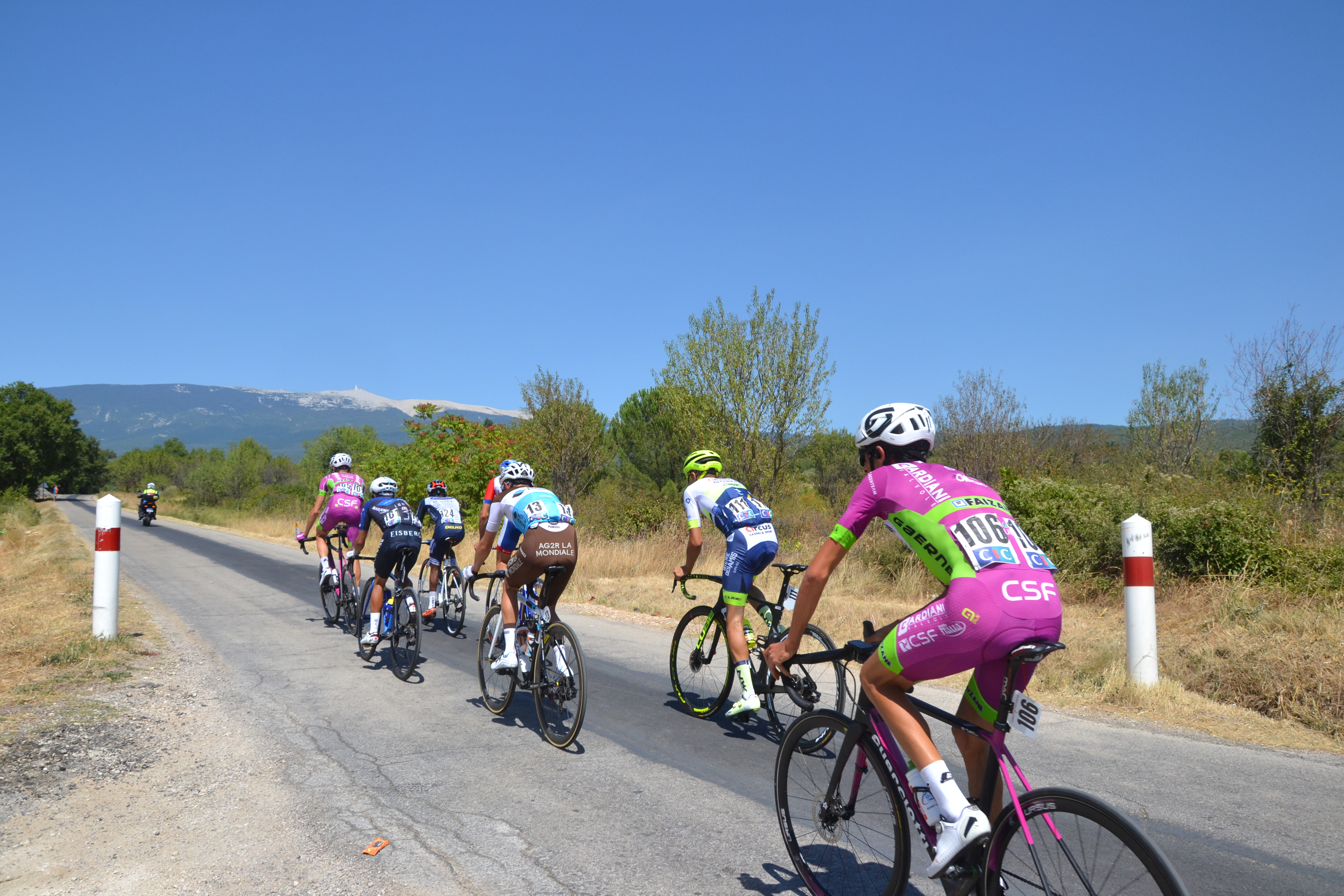

Personal information
- Born: 6 December 1994 (age 31) Empoli, Italy

Cycling career
- Sport: Cycling
- Current team: Retired
- Discipline: Road
- Role: Rider

Amateur teams
- 2013–2014: Mastromarco Chianti Sensi Benedetti Dover
- 2015–2017: Team Colpack

Professional teams
- 2017: Bardiani–CSF (stagiaire)
- 2018–2020: Bardiani–CSF

Umberto Orsini (born 6 December 1994) is an Italian former professional cyclist, who rode professionally for UCI ProTeam Bardiani–CSF–Faizanè between 2018 and 2020. In May 2019, he was named in the startlist for the 2019 Giro d'Italia.

== Major results ==
2012
1st Road race, National Junior Road Championships
1st Trophée de la Ville de Loano
3rd Overall Giro della Lunigiana
2016
8th Piccolo Giro di Lombardia
8th Coppa Città di Offida
8th GP Capodarco
9th Trofeo Piva

=== Grand Tour general classification results timeline ===
Grand Tour	2019
Giro d'Italia	DNF
Tour de France	—
Vuelta a España	—
