= Grzegorz Gwiazdowski =

Polish cyclist

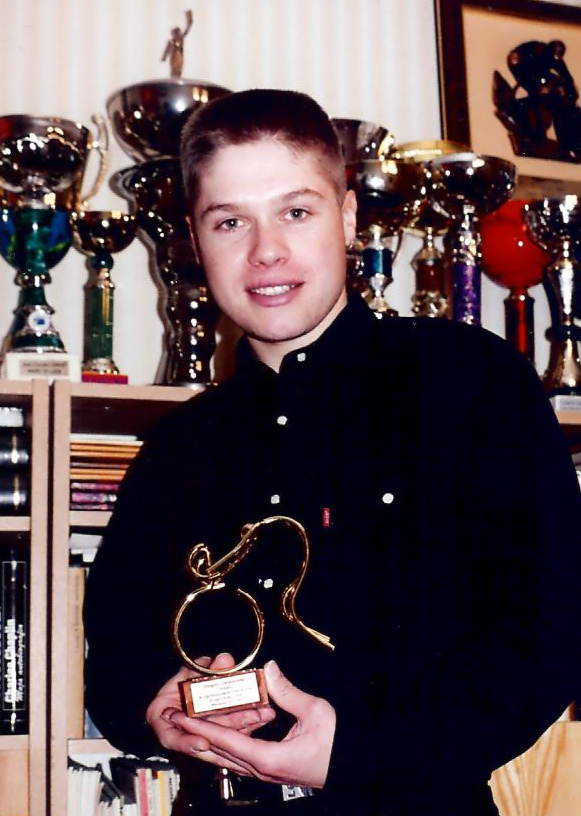
- Grzegorz Gwiazdowski presenting the trophy for the Polish cyclist of the year 1999 at his home in Kurzętnik, Poland

Personal information
- Full name: Grzegorz Gwiazdowski
- Born: 3 November 1974 (age 51) Lubawa, Poland

Cycling career
- Sport: Cycling
- Current team: Retired
- Discipline: Road
- Role: Rider

Professional teams
- 1998–1999: Cofidis
- 2000–2001: Française des Jeux

Major wins
- Züri-Metzgete (1999); Tour de l'Ain (1999)

Grzegorz Gwiazdowski (born 3 November 1974) is a professional racing cyclist from Poland. His most prominent result was in winning the UCI Road World Cup event the Züri-Metzgete in 1999 whilst riding for Cofidis. He rode for Cofidis for two years in 1998 and 1999 before moving to Française des Jeux for 2000 and 2001. He announced his retirement at the end of the 2001 season.

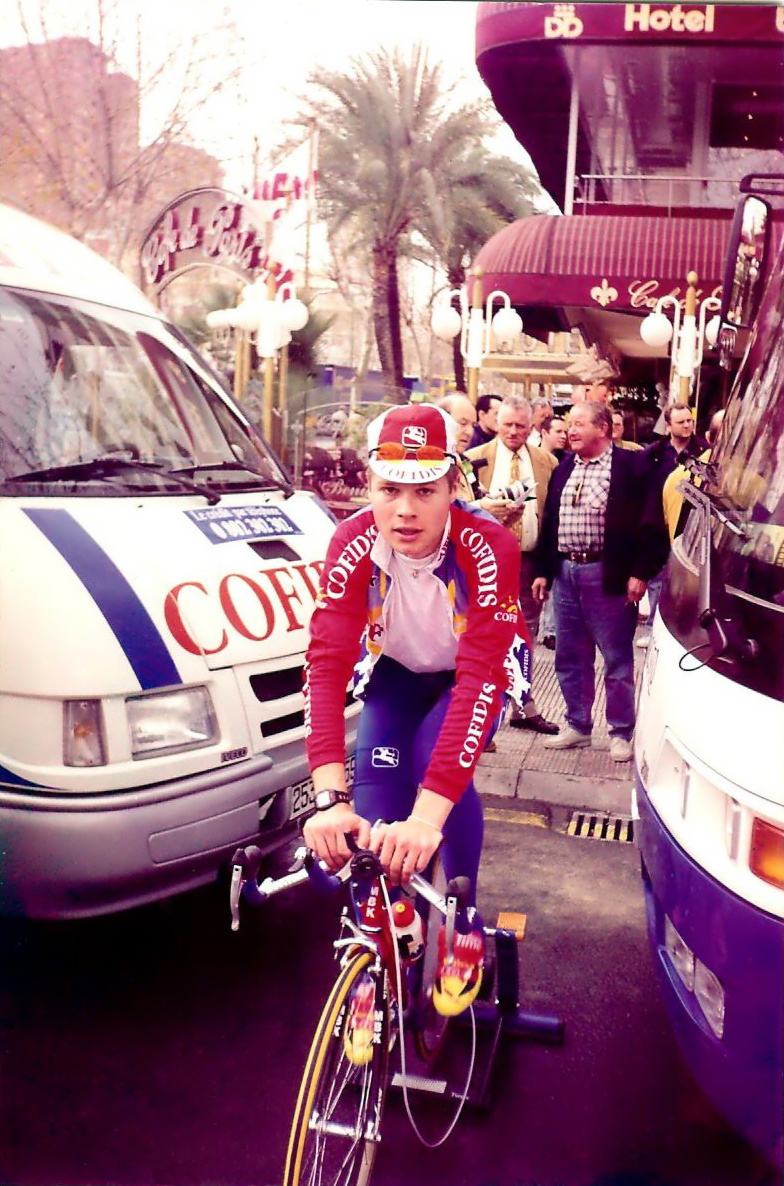
Grzegorz Gwiazdowski wearing Cofidis jersey

== Major results ==
1997
6th Giro del Piemonte
1998
1st Stage 4a Tour de l'Ain
3rd Circuit Franco Belge
4th GP Ouest-France
6th Chrono des Herbiers
10th Polymultipliée de l'Hautil
1999
1st Züri-Metzgete
1st Overall Tour de l'Ain
2nd Overall Tour du Limousin
5th Mi-Aout Bretonne
2000
4th GP de Villers-Cotterêts
7th Overall Route du Sud
