= Raphael Schweda =

German bicyclist (born 1976)

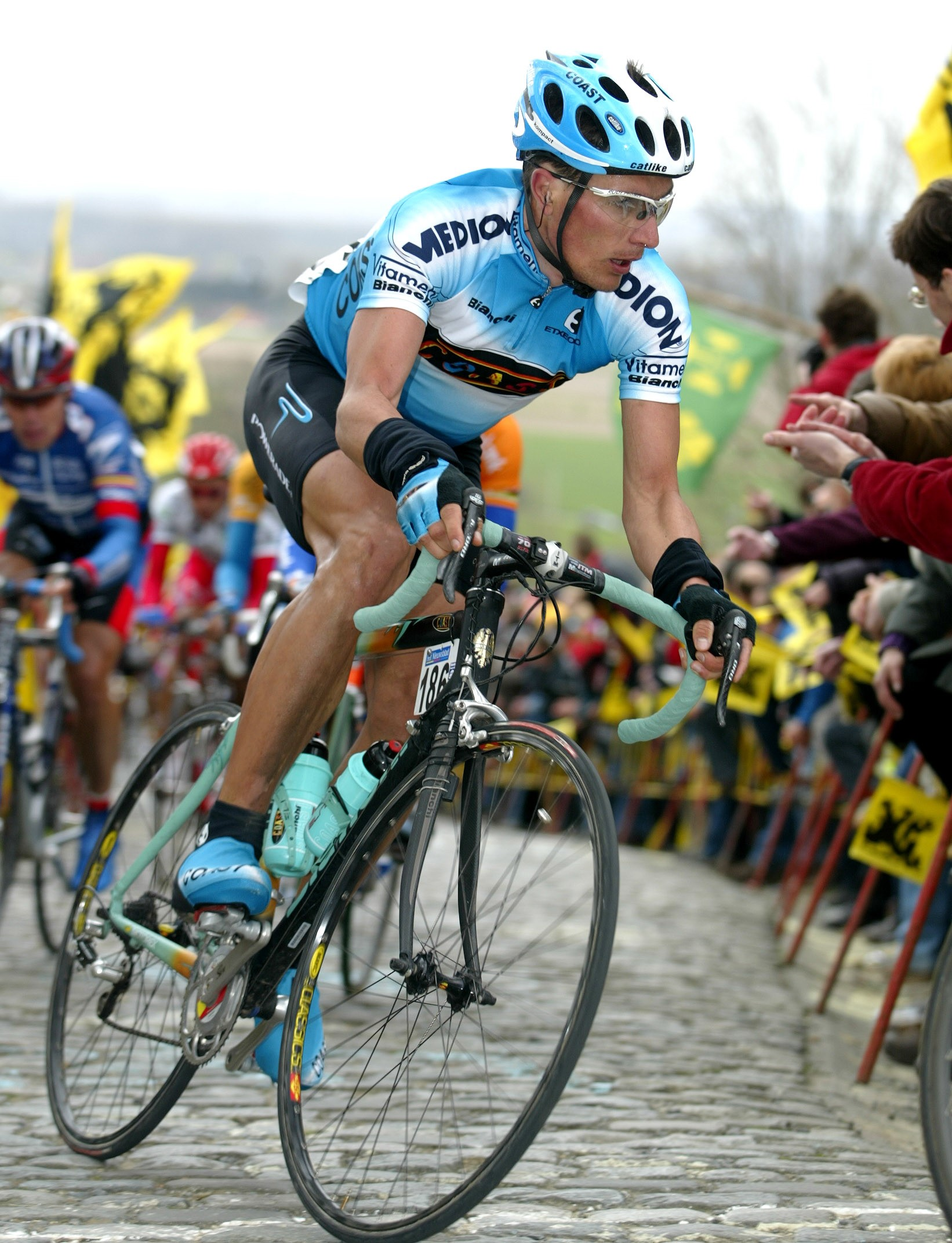
- Schweda in 2002

Personal information
- Nickname: Rapha
- Born: 17 April 1976 (age 50) Rostock, Germany

Cycling career
- Sport: Cycling
- Current team: Retired
- Discipline: Road
- Role: Rider

Professional teams
- 1999–2000: Nürnberger
- 2001–2003: Team Coast

Raphael Schweda (born 17 April 1976 in Rostock) is a former German cyclist.

== Early life and amateur career ==
Schweda's mother is a teacher and his father is an electrical engineer. He has a sister (Juliane), who is 2 years younger. He grew up in Groß Lindow, a village close to Frankfurt (Oder), Brandenburg. Early in his childhood he developed his interests in sports, music and science. He played piano for more than ten years and participated in highly respected music competitions, proving to be one of the best piano musician in his age group. Although he started out as a highly successful swimmer, he was asked to leave the team due to his refusal as to enroll at the sports grammar school. Taking his grandfather as his role model he started at a local cycling club. He proved to be even more successful as a cyclist. However, his early career ended abruptly after he was expected to join the local sport grammar school again, which was the only way to continue his training. He stopped all sport activities altogether for almost two years. Only the reunification offered an opportunity to freely pursue his sport activities again. In the first year as he restarted, he was already 4th in German Road Championship in his age group. Since then he held a permanent spot in the "National – Team" for several years.

== Palmares ==
1996
1st Stage 4 Bayern Rundfahrt
1998
1st National Championship Road U23 in Gera
1st Eschborn-Frankfurt City Loop Worldcup U23
3rd U23 European Road Race Championships
1999
1st Stage 5 Rheinland-Pfalz Rundfahrt
2nd Omloop der Kempen
2nd HEW Cyclassics
2000
1st Rund um die Nürnberger Altstadt
2001
3rd Overall Tour of Sweden

== Career after the sport ==
In 2003, he left sports after the Race Paris Tours. In 2004 he started as a Team-Manager of the Team Wiesenhof–Felt (former Team Winfix–Arnolds Sicherheit). In 2007, the doping difficulties peaked in Germany and the main sponsor Wiesenhof retired. During this period the Team won 2 World Championships in the U 23 Class with Gerald Ciolek and Peter Velits. After his managing the team, Raphael earned a diploma in Business Management at the Fernuni Hagen (Germany). During this period his interest moved to the startup Business. He worked 2 years for Lukasz Gadowski, the founder of Spreadshirt. In 2006, he and his wife Sandra Schweda (née Piplow) founded the Indoor Kletterwald in the Nova Eventis. In 2014 he, Hendrik Gruetzmacher and Ole Eckermann founded the Henara GmbH. Hendrik developed the LIMS System Labmin.
