= List of wins by Chazal and its successors =

This is a comprehensive list of victories of the current Decathlon CMA CGM Team cycling team and its predecessors. The races are categorized according to the UCI Continental Circuits rules.

== 1992 – Chazal ==
Paris–Camembert Lepetit, Patrice Esnault

== 1993 – Chazal ==
Paris–Camembert Lepetit, Oleg Kozlitine
GP d´Isbergues, Jaan Kirsipuu

== 1994 – Chazal ==
Profronde van Oostvoorne, Marco Vermey

== 1996 – Petit Casino ==
Stage 1 Critérium du Dauphiné, Artūras Kasputis

== 1997 – Casino–AG2R Prévoyance ==
Grand Prix du Midi Libre, Alberto Elli
A Travers le Morbihan, Christophe Agnolutto
Tour du Limousin, Lauri Aus
Tour du Haut Var, Rodolfo Massi
Stage 4 Volta a la Comunidad Valenciana, Rodolfo Massi
Stage 4 Paris – Nice, Pascal Chanteur
Cholet – Pays De Loire, Jaan Kirsipuu
Tour de Vendée, Jaan Kirsipuu
Grand Prix de Plumelec-Morbihan, Christophe Agnolutto
Overall Tour de Suisse, Christophe Agnolutto

Stage 3, Christophe Agnolutto

France National Road Championship, Stéphane Barthe
Belgium National Road Championship, Marc Streel
Overall Tour de Pologne, Rolf Järmann

Stage 1 Tour de Pologne, Lauri Aus
Stages 3 & 4 Tour de Pologne, Jaan Kirsipuu

== 1998 – Casino–AG2R Prévoyance ==
Decoplant Grand Prix, Bo Hamburger
Route Adélie de Vitré, Jaan Kirsipuu
Four Days of Dunkirk, Alexander Vinokourov
Overall Tour Méditerranéen, Rodolfo Massi
Overall Tour de Picardie, Alexander Vinokourov
Overall Tour du Poitou Charentes, Lauri Aus
Overall Tour du Limousin, Vincent Cali
Circuit de Lorraine Professionnels, Alexander Vinokourov
Vuelta Ciclista a Murcia – Costa Calida, Alberto Elli
GP d'Ouverture La Marseillaise, Marco Saligari
Trofeo Laigueglia, Pascal Chanteur
Classic Haribo, Lauri Aus
Overall Volta a la Comunidad Valenciana, Pascal Chanteur

Stage 2, Bo Hamburger

Overall Tirreno – Adriatico, Rolf Järmann
Cholet – Pays De Loire, Jaan Kirsipuu
Stage 1 Setmana Catalana de Ciclisme, Stéphane Barthe
Stage 2 Setmana Catalana de Ciclisme, Rolf Järmann
Stage 2 Critérium International, Rodolfo Massi
GP de la Ville de Rennes, Pascal Chanteur
Stage 2 Vuelta Ciclista al Pais Vasco, Bo Hamburger
Stage 4 Vuelta Ciclista al Pais Vasco, Alberto Elli
La Flèche Wallonne, Bo Hamburger
GP de Denain Porte du Hainaut, Jaan Kirsipuu
Amstel Gold Race, Rolf Järmann
Stage 5 Tour de Romandie, Christophe Agnolutto
GP de Villers Cotterêts, Jaan Kirsipuu
Estonia National Road Championship, Jaan Kirsipuu
Estonia National Time Trial Championship, Jaan Kirsipuu
Stage 8 Tour de France, Jacky Durand
Stage 10 Tour de France, Rodolfo Massi
Overall Tour of Denmark, Marc Streel
Stage 3 Vuelta a España, Jaan Kirsipuu
Stage 6 Tour de Pologne, Alexander Vinokourov
Stage 7 Tour de Pologne, Jacky Durand
Paris – Tours, Jacky Durand

== 1999 – Casino–AG2R Prévoyance ==
Étoile de Bessèges, David Lefevre
Grand Prix du Midi Libre, Benoit Salmon
Tour de Picardie, Jaan Kirsipuu
La Côte Picarde, Pascal Chanteur
Circuit de Lorraine Professionnels, Artūras Kasputis
Overall Volta a la Comunidad Valenciana, Alexander Vinokourov

Stage 5b, Alexander Vinokourov

Stage 3 Paris – Nice, Jaan Kirsipuu
Stage 4 Paris – Nice, Laurent Roux
Cholet – Pays De Loire, Jaan Kirsipuu
Stage 1 Critérium International, Stéphane Barthe
Tour de Vendée, Jaan Kirsipuu
Trophée des Grimpeurs, Laurent Roux
Overall Critérium du Dauphiné, Alexander Vinokourov

Stage 1, Christophe Oriol
Stage 2, Alexander Vinokourov

Stage 1 Tour of Sweden, Jaan Kirsipuu
France National Time Trial Championship, Gilles Maignan
Estonia National Time Trial Championship, Jaan Kirsipuu
Estonia National Road Championship, Jaan Kirsipuu
Stage 1 Tour de France, Jaan Kirsipuu
Stage 3 Tour du Poitou Charentes et de la Vienne, Stéphane Barthe
Stage 5 Tour du Poitou Charentes et de la Vienne, Jaan Kirsipuu
Stage 3 Tour de Pologne, Jaan Kirsipuu
GP d´Isbergues, Lauri Aus

== 2000 – AG2R Prévoyance ==
Overall Tour Down Under, Gilles Maignan
Stages 1, 3 & 6 Étoile de Bessèges, Jaan Kirsipuu
Stage 1 Tour Méditerranéen, Jaan Kirsipuu
Classic Haribo, Jaan Kirsipuu
Stage 2 Paris – Nice, Jaan Kirsipuu
Stage 5a Setmana Catalana de Ciclisme, Jaan Kirsipuu
Tour de Vendée, Jaan Kirsipuu
Stage 2 Four Days of Dunkirk, Artūras Kasputis
Stage 7 Four Days of Dunkirk, Jaan Kirsipuu
Estonia National Road Championship, Lauri Aus
Estonia National Time Trial Championship, Lauri Aus
Stage 7 Tour de France, Christophe Agnolutto
Stage 4b Tour of Denmark, Artūras Kasputis
Stage 5 Tour of Denmark, Jaan Kirsipuu
Stage 4 Tour du Poitou Charentes et de la Vienne, Gilles Maignan
Stages 2, 3 & 4 Tour de Pologne, Jaan Kirsipuu

== 2001 – AG2R Prévoyance ==
A Travers le Morbihan, Gilles Maignan
Stages 5 & 6 Tour Méditerranéen, Jaan Kirsipuu
Route Adélie de Vitré, Jaan Kirsipuu
GP de Denain Porte du Hainaut, Jaan Kirsipuu
Stages 1, 2, 4 & 7 Four Days of Dunkirk, Jaan Kirsipuu
Grand Prix de Plumelec-Morbihan, Gilles Maignan
Stage 2 Tour de Luxembourg, Jaan Kirsipuu
Estonia National Time Trial Championship, Jaan Kirsipuu
Belgium National Road Championship, Ludovic Capelle
Stage 6 Tour de France, Jaan Kirsipuu
Overall Tour de la Somme, Laurent Estadieu
Stage 5 Tour de l´Ain, David Delrieu
Stage 6 Tour of Denmark, Jaan Kirsipuu
Stage 2 Tour du Poitou Charentes et de la Vienne, Jaan Kirsipuu
Stage 5 Tour du Poitou Charentes et de la Vienne, Lauri Aus
Stage 1 Tour de Pologne, Jaan Kirsipuu

== 2002 – AG2R Prévoyance ==
Les 3 Jours de Vaucluse, Mark Scanlon
Stages 4 & 5 Étoile de Bessèges, Jaan Kirsipuu
Classic Haribo, Jaan Kirsipuu
Kuurne–Bruxelles–Kuurne, Jaan Kirsipuu
Tartu GP, Jaan Kirsipuu
Estonia National Road Championship, Jaan Kirsipuu
Ireland National Road Championship, Makr Scanlon
Estonia National Time Trial Championship, Jaan Kirsipuu
Stage 5 Tour de France, Jaan Kirsipuu
Overall Tour de l´Ain, Christophe Oriol

Stage 3, Christophe Oriol

== 2003 – AG2R Prévoyance ==
Overall Tour Down Under, Mikel Astarloza
GP Costa degli Etruschi, Jaan Kirsipuu
Stage 5 Étoile de Bessèges, Jaan Kirsipuu
Classic Haribo, Jaan Kirsipuu
Overall Johan Museeuw Classics, Jaan Kirsipuu

Stage 2, Jaan Kirsipuu

Overall Tour de Normandie, Samuel Dumoulin
Overall Critérium International, Laurent Borchard

Stage 2, Laurent Borchard

Tour de Vendée, Jaan Kirsipuu
Paris–Camembert Lepetit, Laurent Borchard
Stage 2 Tour de Romandie, Yuriy Krivtsov
Stage 3 Four Days of Dunkirk, Jaan Kirsipuu
STage 6 Four Days of Dunkirk, Jean-Patrick Nazon
Tartu GP, Jaan Kirsipuu
Tro-Bro Léon, Samuel Dumoulin
Stage 2 Route du Sud, Ludovic Turpin
Ireland National Road Championship, Mark Scanlon
Estonia National Time Trial Championship, Jaan Kirsipuu
Spain National Time Trial Championship, Inigo Bernardez
Stage 20 Tour de France, Jean-Patrick Nazon
Stage 2 Tour de la Région Wallonne, Stéphane Berges
Stage 1 Tour of Denmark, Mark Scanlon
Stage 3 Tour de l´Ain, Ludovic Turpin
Stage 6 Tour of Denmark, Jaan Kirsipuu
GP Ouest France-Plouay, Andy Flickinger
Stage 3 Tour du Poitou Charentes et de la Vienne, Jaan Kirsipuu

== 2004 – AG2R Prévoyance ==
Overall Étoile de Bessèges, Laurent Borchard

Stages 2 & 5, Jaan Kirsipuu
Stage 4, Laurent Borchard

Stages 1 & 2 Johan Museeuw Classics, Jaan Kirsipuu
Classic Loire Atlantique, Erki Pütsep
Stage 1 Critérium International, Jean-Patrick Nazon
Tro-Bro Léon, Samuel Dumoulin
E.O.S Tallinn GP, Mark Scanlon
Tartu GP, Mark Scanlon
Stage 3 Critérium du Dauphiné, Nicloas Portal
Estonia National Road Championship, Erki Pütsep
Estonia National Time Trial Championship, Jaan Kirsipuu
Ukraine National Time Trial Championship, Yuriy Krivtsov
Stage 1 Tour de France, Jaan Kirsipuu
Stage 3 Tour de France, Jean-Patrick Nazon
Stage 4 Tour de la Région Wallonne, Jaan Kirsipuu
Stage 3a Tour de l´Ain, Jean-Patrick Nazon

== 2005 – AG2R Prévoyance ==
GP de la Ville de Rennes, Ludovic Turpin
Stage 2a Circuit Cycliste Sarthe, Andy Flickinger
Tour du Finistère, Simon Gerrans
Stage 2 Bayern–Rundfahrt, Jean-Patrick Nazon
Tartu GP, Thomas Vaitkus
Stage 2 Critérium du Dauphiné, Samuel Dumoulin
Stage 1 Boucles de la Mayenne, Alexandre Usov
Stage 2 Boucles de la Mayenne, Laurent Mangel
Tour du Doubs, Philip Deignan
Stage 2 Tour du Limousin, Samuel Dumoulin
GP Industria e Commercio Artigianato Carnaghese, Simon Gerrans
Stage 1 International Hessen Rundfahrt, Jean-Patrick Nazon
Stage 4 International Hessen Rundfahrt, Alexandre Usov
Memorial Rik Van Steenbergen, Jean-Patrick Nazon
Overall Tour de la Somme, Erki Pütsep

Stage 1, Erki Pütsep

Jayco Herald Sun Tour, Simon Gerrans

== 2006 – AG2R Prévoyance ==
Overall Tour Down Under, Simon Gerrans

Stage 1, Simon Gerrans

Stage 6 Tour de Langkawi, Laurent Mangel
Overall Tour Méditerranéen, Cyril Dessel

Stage 4, Cyril Dessel

Le Samyn, Renaud Dion
Route Adélie de Vitré, Samuel Dumoulin
Stage 9 Giro d'Italia, Tomas Vaitkus
Stage 1 Circuit de Lorraine, Jean-Patrick Nazon
Stage 4 Circuit de Lorraine, Christophe Riblon
Stage 5 Critérium du Dauphiné Libéré, Ludovic Turpin
Stage 2 Route du Sud, Jean-Patrick Nazon
Estonia Road Race Championships, Erki Pütsep
Stage 8 Tour de France, Sylvain Calzati
Overall Tour de l'Ain, Cyril Dessel

Stage 1, Cyril Dessel

Stage 19 Vuelta a España, José Luis Arrieta
Overall Herald Sun Tour, Simon Gerrans

== 2007 – AG2R Prévoyance ==
Overall Tour Down Under, Martin Elmiger
Stage 4 Tour Méditerranéen, Rinaldo Nocentini
Stage 1 Paris–Nice, Jean-Patrick Nazon
GP Miguel Induráin, Rinaldo Nocentini
Stage 1 Circuit de Lorraine, Ludovic Turpin
Grand Prix de Plumelec-Morbihan, Simon Gerrans
Grand Prix of Aargau Canton, John Gadret
Overall Critérium du Dauphiné Libéré, Christophe Moreau

Stages 2 & 4, Christophe Moreau

Stage 1 Route du Sud, Jean-Patrick Nazon
France Road Race Championships, Christophe Moreau
Overall Tour de l'Ain, John Gadret

Stage 3, John Gadret

Stage 4 Tour du Limousin, Alexandre Usov
Tour de la Somme, Christophe Riblon
Grand Prix d'Isbergues, Martin Elmiger

== 2008 – Ag2r–La Mondiale ==
Stage 7 Tour de Langkawi, Alexandre Usov
Gran Premio di Lugano, Rinaldo Nocentini
Stage 5 Four Days of Dunkirk, Cyril Dessel
Stage 2 Tour de Picardie, Martin Elmiger
Stage 3 Volta a Catalunya, Cyril Dessel
Grand Prix of Aargau Canton, Lloyd Mondory
Stage 4 Critérium du Dauphiné Libéré, Cyril Dessel
Estonia Time Trial Championships, Tanel Kangert
Moldova Road Race Championships, Alexandre Pliușchin
Stage 9 Tour de France, Vladimir Efimkin
Stage 16 Tour de France, Cyril Dessel
Stage 2 Paris–Corrèze, Lloyd Mondory
Stage 4 Tour de l'Ain, John Gadret

== 2009 – Ag2r–La Mondiale ==
Stage 7 Tour of California, Rinaldo Nocentini
Stage 1 Route du Sud, Nicolas Rousseau
Stage 3 Route du Sud, Christophe Riblon
Ireland Road Race Championships, Nicolas Roche
Stage 3a Tour de l'Ain, Ludovic Turpin

== 2010 – Ag2r–La Mondiale ==
Stage 2 La Tropicale Amissa Bongo, Julien Loubet
Stage 3 La Tropicale Amissa Bongo, Nicolas Rousseau
Overall Tour Méditerranéen, Rinaldo Nocentini
Stage 1 Tour du Haut Var, Rinaldo Nocentini
Boucles du Sud Ardèche, Christophe Riblon
Stages 2 & 5 Circuit de la Sarthe, Anthony Ravard
Overall Four Days of Dunkirk, Martin Elmiger

Stage 4, Martin Elmiger

Stage 2a Route du Sud, Blel Kadri
Switzerland Road Race Championships, Martin Elmiger
Stage 14 Tour de France, Christophe Riblon
Stage 3 Tour de Wallonie, Kristof Goddaert
Stage 3 Tour de l'Ain, Maxime Bouet
Stage 2 Tour du Poitou-Charentes, Anthony Ravard
Châteauroux Classic, Anthony Ravard
GP de la Somme, Martin Elmiger
Paris–Bourges, Anthony Ravard

== 2011 – Ag2r–La Mondiale ==
Overall Étoile de Bessèges, Anthony Ravard

Stage 2, Lloyd Mondory

Stage 11 Giro d'Italia, John Gadret
Châteauroux Classic, Anthony Ravard
Stage 3 Tour du Poitou Charentes, Anthony Ravard
Stage 3 Tour of Beijing, Nicolas Roche

== 2012 – Ag2r–La Mondiale ==
Luxembourg Time Trial Championships, Ben Gastauer
Stage 3 Circuit de Lorraine, Sébastien Hinault
Stage 6 Tour of California, Sylvain Georges
Boucles de l'Aulne, Sébastien Hinault
Stage 4 Route du Sud, Manuel Belletti

== 2013 – Ag2r–La Mondiale ==
Stage 5 Étoile de Bessèges, Samuel Dumoulin
Stage 4 Tour Méditerranéen, Jean-Christophe Péraud
Roma Maxima, Blel Kadri
Stage 1a Giro del Trentino, Maxime Bouet
Grand Prix de Plumelec-Morbihan, Samuel Dumoulin
Young rider classification in the Giro d'Italia, Carlos Betancur
Stage 18 Tour de France, Christophe Riblon
Stage 2 Tour de Pologne, Christophe Riblon
Overall Tour de l'Ain, Romain Bardet
Overall French Road Cycling Cup, Samuel Dumoulin

== 2014 – Ag2r–La Mondiale ==
Stage 5 Tour Méditerranéen, Jean-Christophe Péraud
Overall Tour du Haut Var, Carlos Betancur

Stage 1, Carlos Betancur

La Drôme Classic, Romain Bardet
Overall Paris–Nice, Carlos Betancur

Stages 5 & 6, Carlos Betancur

Classic Loire Atlantique, Alexis Gougeard
Overall Critérium International, Jean-Christophe Péraud
Grand Prix de la Somme, Yauheni Hutarovich
Teams classification Giro d'Italia
Boucles de l'Aulne, Alexis Gougeard
Belarus National Road Race Championships, Yauheni Hutarovich
Teams classification Tour de France

Stage 8, Blel Kadri

Stage 1 Tour de Pologne, Yauheni Hutarovich
Stage 4 Vuelta a Burgos, Lloyd Mondory
Stage 2 Tour du Gévaudan Languedoc-Roussillon, Alexis Vuillermoz

== 2015 – AG2R La Mondiale ==
Overall Tour du Haut Var, Ben Gastauer

Stage 1, Ben Gastauer

La Drôme Classic, Samuel Dumoulin
Classic Loire Atlantique, Alexis Gougeard
Stage 3 Volta a Catalunya, Domenico Pozzovivo
Overall Critérium International, Jean-Christophe Péraud

Stage 3, Jean-Christophe Péraud

Grand Prix de la Somme, Quentin Jaurégui
Stage 3 Giro del Trentino, Domenico Pozzovivo
Stage 3 Four Days of Dunkirk, Alexis Gougeard
Grand Prix de Plumelec-Morbihan, Alexis Vuillermoz
Stage 5 Critérium du Dauphiné, Romain Bardet
Canada Time Trial Championships, Hugo Houle
Stage 8 Tour de France, Alexis Vuillermoz
Stage 18 Tour de France, Romain Bardet
Stage 4 Tour de l'Ain, Pierre Latour
Aquece Rio – International Road Cycling Challenge, Alexis Vuillermoz
Stage 19 Vuelta a España, Alexis Gougeard
Stage 2 Tour du Gévaudan Languedoc-Roussillon, Alexis Vuillermoz
Overall Tour de l'Eurométropole, Alexis Gougeard

Prologue, Alexis Gougeard

Giro del Piemonte, Jan Bakelants
Giro dell'Emilia, Jan Bakelants

== 2016 – AG2R La Mondiale ==
Stage 4 La Méditerranéenne, Jan Bakelants
Paris–Camembert, Cyril Gautier
La Roue Tourangelle, Samuel Dumoulin
Grand Prix de Plumelec-Morbihan, Samuel Dumoulin
Boucles de l'Aulne, Samuel Dumoulin
Stage 19 Tour de France, Romain Bardet
Stage 20 Vuelta a España, Pierre Latour
Tour du Doubs, Samuel Dumoulin

== 2017 – AG2R La Mondiale ==
Stage 1 Tour du Haut Var, Samuel Dumoulin
Stage 2 Tour La Provence, Alexandre Geniez
Stage 4 Tour of the Alps, Matteo Montaguti
Grand Prix de Plumelec-Morbihan, Alexis Vuillermoz
Stage 6 Tour de Suisse, Domenico Pozzovivo
France Time Trial Championships, Pierre Latour
Belgium Road Race Championships, Oliver Naesen
Stage 12 Tour de France, Romain Bardet
Polynormande, Alexis Gougeard
Stage 4 Tour de l'Ain, Alexandre Geniez
Paris–Bourges, Rudy Barbier
Tre Valli Varesine, Alexandre Geniez
Stage 3 Tour du Limousin, Cyril Gautier
Grand Prix d'Isbergues, Benoît Cosnefroy
Stage 2 Rhône-Alpes Isère Tour, Benoît Cosnefroy
World Championships U23 Road Race, Benoît Cosnefroy

== 2018 – AG2R La Mondiale ==
Grand Prix Cycliste la Marseillaise, Alexandre Geniez
Overall Étoile de Bessèges, Tony Gallopin

Stage 5 (ITT), Tony Gallopin

Overall Tour La Provence, Alexandre Geniez

Prologue, Alexandre Geniez

Classic Sud-Ardèche, Romain Bardet
Route Adélie de Vitré, Silvan Dillier
Stage 2, Route d'Occitanie, Clément Venturini
Lithuania National Championships, Road Race, Gediminas Bagdonas
Lithuania National Championships, Time Trial, Gediminas Bagdonas
French National Championships, Time Trial, Pierre Latour
White Jersey Tour de France, Pierre Latour
Bretagne Classic, Oliver Naesen
Stage 7 Vuelta a España, Tony Gallopin
Stage 12 Vuelta a España, Alexandre Geniez
Tour de Vendée, Nico Denz

== 2019 – AG2R La Mondiale ==
France National Cyclo-cross championships, Clément Venturini
La Drôme Classic, Alexis Vuillermoz
Overall Circuit Cycliste Sarthe – Pays de la Loire, Alexis Gougeard

Stage 3, Alexis Gougeard

Paris–Camembert, Benoît Cosnefroy
Stage 2 Tour de l'Ain, Alexandre Geniez
Stage 17 Giro d'Italia, Nans Peters
Grand Prix de Plumelec-Morbihan, Benoît Cosnefroy
Boucles de l'Aulne, Alexis Gougeard
Prologue Boucles de la Mayenne, Dorian Godon
Lithuania National Championships, Time Trial, Gediminas Bagdonas
Mountains classification, Tour de France, Romain Bardet
La Poly Normande, Benoît Cosnefroy
Stage 7 BinckBank Tour, Oliver Naesen
Overall Tour du Limousin, Benoît Cosnefroy

Stage 3 Tour du Limousin, Benoît Cosnefroy

Mountains classification Vuelta a España, Geoffrey Bouchard

== 2020 – AG2R La Mondiale ==
France National Cyclo-cross championships, Clément Venturini
Grand Prix Cycliste la Marseillaise, Benoît Cosnefroy
Overall Étoile de Bessèges, Benoît Cosnefroy
Stage 4 Route d'Occitanie, Benoît Cosnefroy
Stage 8 Tour de France, Nans Peters
Paris–Camembert, Dorian Godon

== 2021 – AG2R Citroën Team ==
France National Cyclo-cross championships, Clément Venturini
Grand Prix Cycliste la Marseillaise, Aurélien Paret-Peintre
Mountains classification Giro d'Italia, Geoffrey Bouchard

Stage 12, Andrea Vendrame

Tour du Finistère, Benoît Cosnefroy
Stage 1 Route d'Occitanie, Andrea Vendrame
Paris–Camembert, Dorian Godon
Stage 9 Tour de France, Ben O'Connor
Stage 2 Tour de Limousin, Dorian Godon
Bretagne Classic, Benoît Cosnefroy
Tour du Jura, Benoît Cosnefroy
Stage 20 Vuelta a España, Clément Champoussin
Tour du Doubs, Dorian Godon
Boucles de l'Aulne, Stan Dewulf

== 2022 – AG2R Citroën Team ==
Cholet-Pays de la Loire, Marc Sarreau
Stage 3 Volta a Catalunya, Ben O'Connor
Tour du Jura, Ben O'Connor
Stage 1 Tour of the Alps, Geoffrey Bouchard
Luxembourg National Time Trial Championships, Bob Jungels
Stage 9 Tour de France, Bob Jungels
Stage 3 Vuelta a Burgos, Bastien Tronchon
Stages 1, 2 & 3 Tour Poitou-Charentes en Nouvelle Aquitaine, Marc Sarreau
Grand Prix Cycliste de Québec, Benoît Cosnefroy

== 2023 – AG2R Citroën Team ==
Stage 3 Tour des Alpes-Maritimes et du Var, Aurélien Paret-Peintre
Trofeo Laigueglia, Nans Peters
Brabantse Pijl, Dorian Godon
Stage 4 Giro d'Italia, Aurélien Paret-Peintre
Boucles de l'Aulne, Greg Van Avermaet
Stage 4 Tour de Suisse, Felix Gall
Stage 17 Tour de France, Felix Gall
Stage 4 Tour Poitou-Charentes en Nouvelle Aquitaine, Marc Sarreau
Giro del Veneto, Dorian Godon

== 2024 – Decathlon–AG2R La Mondiale ==
Vuelta a Murcia, Ben O'Connor
Overall Tour des Alpes-Maritimes, Benoît Cosnefroy

Stage 2, Benoît Cosnefroy

Stage 3 UAE Tour, Ben O'Connor
Classic Loire Atlantique, Paul Lapeira
Cholet-Pays de la Loire, Paul Lapeira
Paris–Camembert, Benoît Cosnefroy
Stage 2 Tour of the Basque Country, Paul Lapeira
Brabantse Pijl, Benoît Cosnefroy
Stage 5 Tour of the Alps, Aurélien Paret-Peintre
Stages 1 & 5 Tour de Romandie, Dorian Godon
Grand Prix du Morbihan, Benoît Cosnefroy
Tour du Finistère, Benoît Cosnefroy
Stage 10 Giro d'Italia, Valentin Paret-Peintre
Stage 19 Giro d'Italia, Andrea Vendrame
Overall Four Days of Dunkirk, Sam Bennett

Stages 2, 3, 5 & 6, Sam Bennett

Prologue Boucles de la Mayenne, Benoît Cosnefroy
Stage 3 Boucles de la Mayenne, Valentin Retailleau
Finland National Road Race Championships, Jaakko Hänninen
France National Time Trial Championships, Bruno Armirail
France National Road Race Championships, Paul Lapeira
Polynormande, Paul Lapeira
Overall Tour du Limousin, Alex Baudin

Stage 2, Alex Baudin

Stage 6 Vuelta a España, Ben O'Connor

== 2025 – Decathlon–AG2R La Mondiale ==
Stages 1 & 3 Tour de la Provence, Sam Bennett
Stage 2 Tour des Alpes-Maritimes, Dorian Godon
Stage 3 Tirreno–Adriatico, Andrea Vendrame
Stages 1 & 3 Région Pays de la Loire Tour, Sam Bennett
Stage 5 Tour of the Alps, Nicolas Prodhomme
Tour du Finistère, Aubin Sparfel
Grand Prix du Morbihan, Benoît Cosnefroy
Tro-Bro Léon, Bastien Tronchon
Stage 3 Four Days of Dunkirk, Pierre Gautherat
Stage 19 Giro d'Italia, Nicolas Prodhomme
Overall Route d'Occitanie, Nicolas Prodhomme

Stage 3, Nicolas Prodhomme

France National Time Trial Championships, Bruno Armirail
France National Road Race Championships, Dorian Godon
Stage 2 Tour de Pologne, Paul Lapeira
Stage 3 Vuelta a Burgos, Léo Bisiaux
Stage 2 Tour de l'Ain, Nicolas Prodhomme
Polynormande, Nicolas Prodhomme
Stage 3 Tour du Limousin, Paul Lapeira
Stage 4 Tour du Limousin, Andrea Vendrame
Stages 2 & 4 Tour Poitou-Charentes en Nouvelle Aquitaine, Dorian Godon
Coppa Bernocchi, Dorian Godon
Tour de Vendée, Dorian Godon

== 2026 – Decathlon–CMA CGM ==
Stage 1 Tour Down Under, Tobias Lund Andresen
Cadel Evans Great Ocean Road Race, Tobias Lund Andresen
Overall Tour de la Provence, Matthew Riccitello

Stage 2, Matthew Riccitello

Stage 2 Volta ao Algarve, Paul Seixas
Tour des Alpes-Maritimes, Paul Lapeira
Ardèche Classic, Paul Seixas
Stage 3 Tirreno–Adriatico, Tobias Lund Andresen
Paris–Camembert, Pierre Gautherat
Overall Tour of the Basque Country, Paul Seixas

Stages 1 (ITT), 2 & 5, Paul Seixas

Overall Région Pays de la Loire Tour, Antoine L'Hote

Stage 4, Antoine L'Hote

== Supplementary statistics ==
=== 1992 to 2012 ===
Grand Tours by highest finishing position
Race	1992	1993	1994	1995	1996	1997	1998	1999	2000	2001	2002	2003	2004	2005	2006	2007	2008	2009	2010	2011	2012
Giro d'Italia	–	–	–	–	–	–	26	–	–	–	–	–	–	–	32	25	13	33	13	3	11
Tour de France	–	37	22	34	–	26	15	16	32	17	30	24	20	27	6	27	9	12	13	9	12
Vuelta a España	–	–	–	85	21	12	18	–	–	–	61	–	55	–	26	13	18	30	6	16	12
Major week-long stage races by highest finishing position
Race	1992	1993	1994	1995	1996	1997	1998	1999	2000	2001	2002	2003	2004	2005	2006	2007	2008	2009	2010	2011	2012
Tour Down Under	Did not Exist							8	1	6	2	1	16	7	1	1	13	4	16	8	18
Paris–Nice	26	13	41	17	44	5	5	20	15	45	25	17	23	22	18	30	2	16	10	6	14
Tirreno–Adriatico	–	–	–	–	–	10	1	–	–	–	–	–	–	–	48	25	14	22	50	20	4
Volta a Catalunya	–	–	–	–	–	–	5	–	–	–	–	–	–	–	3	4	11	17	5	10	40
Tour of the Basque Country	–	–	–	–	–	25	6	–	–	–	51	–	–	–	22	34	61	21	41	40	7
Tour de Romandie	–	–	–	–	–	35	31	–	14	–	–	10	37	–	14	11	8	29	18	26	21
Critérium du Dauphiné	18	6	3	7	13	13	15	1	9	3	12	5	13	14	2	1	6	15	7	7	19
Tour de Suisse	–	–	–	–	–	1	29	–	–	–	35	25	–	–	18	14	14	7	19	29	10
Tour de Pologne	–	–	–	–	–	1	2	22	21	11	–	4	–	–	45	17	18	15	80	6	6
Eneco Tour	–	–	–	64	–	–	–	–	–	–	DNF	–	–	–	65	21	15	32	65	27	33
Monument races by highest finishing position
Race	1992	1993	1994	1995	1996	1997	1998	1999	2000	2001	2002	2003	2004	2005	2006	2007	2008	2009	2010	2011	2012
Milan–San Remo	–	–	–	–	–	2	10	5	32	–	–	26	37	–	–	14	7	11	38	41	39
Tour of Flanders	–	–	–	–	–	29	41	46	89	32	–	–	13	57	82	33	22	9	14	17	33
Paris–Roubaix	45	29	OTL	OTL	16	14	47	35	34	21	35	16	22	53	47	22	32	60	9	17	19
Liège–Bastogne–Liège	–	–	44	48	–	40	3	10	50	–	–	52	18	66	35	15	18	15	20	39	11
Giro di Lombardia	–	–	–	39	–	53	5	49	37	–	–	–	–	–	31	22	20	19	21	16	18
Classics by highest finishing position
Classic	1992	1993	1994	1995	1996	1997	1998	1999	2000	2001	2002	2003	2004	2005	2006	2007	2008	2009	2010	2011	2012
Omloop Het Nieuwsblad	21	76	69	20	–	7	24	–	9	40	24	12	–	44	19	30	4	26	84	14	7
Kuurne–Brussels–Kuurne	–	–	14	33	23	2	4	–	3	8	1	5	53	DNF	32	22	26	30	13	7	13
Strade Bianche	Did not Exist															–	32	3	25	–	–
E3 Harelbeke	–	60	72	–	–	36	17	–	–	–	12	7	2	15	84	19	73	39	13	8	17
Gent–Wevelgem	–	24	–	47	–	21	–	19	43	–	–	16	3	–	8	10	28	31	OTL	5	37
Amstel Gold Race	–	–	–	–	–	14	1	5	50	–	–	–	25	–	40	16	13	23	32	32	9
La Flèche Wallonne	–	–	–	29	–	28	1	51	57	–	–	–	45	66	23	6	10	10	29	30	12
Clásica de San Sebastián	–	–	–	–	25	16	22	32	8	–	24	20	26	–	26	17	8	6	8	21	16
Paris–Tours	38	14	26	17	8	20	1	3	9	8	37	25	9	21	5	7	49	28	12	32	14

=== 2013 to present ===
Grand Tours by highest finishing position
Race	2013	2014	2015	2016	2017	2018	2019	2020	2021	2022	2023	2024	2025	2026
Giro d'Italia	5	5	20	11	6	11	29	16	41	23	15	4	15	2
Tour de France	15	2	9	2	3	6	15	26	4	12	8	14	5	4
Vuelta a España	6	54	11	13	17	11	24	31	14	8	27	2	8	
Major week-long stage races by highest finishing position
Race	2013	2014	2015	2016	2017	2018	2019	2020	2021	2022	2023	2024	2025	2026
Tour Down Under	18	15	6	7	17	13	32	30	NH		6	8	5	24
Paris–Nice	3	1	14	9	19	8	5	19	9	10	11	9	12	24
Tirreno–Adriatico	11	4	8	21	10	13	44	17	25	22	13	5	31	35
Volta a Catalunya	25	4	3	6	10	3	55	NH	44	6	14	18	46	6
Tour of the Basque Country	7	3	14	14	15	13	61	NH	23	12	10	10	11	1
Tour de Romandie	6	30	9	12	14	8	12	NH	6	5	22	22	12	–
Critérium du Dauphiné	–	5	6	2	6	3	10	6	8	3	3	27	8	21
Tour de Suisse	13	77	5	23	4	17	16	NH	19	6	8	10	4	7
Tour de Pologne	3	4	7	28	6	14	6	36	14	15	22	13	12	11
BinckBank Tour	33	13	11	39	5	19	2	17	26	NH	16	5	7	3
Monuments by highest finishing position
Monument	2013	2014	2015	2016	2017	2018	2019	2020	2021	2022	2023	2024	2025	2026
Milan–San Remo	17	28	27	13	41	26	2	11	13	30	22	20	34	13
Tour of Flanders	30	20	89	31	23	11	7	7	3	15	16	7	16	13
Paris–Roubaix	17	14	26	28	31	2	13	NH	32	17	37	24	7	8
Liège–Bastogne–Liège	4	5	6	13	6	3	21	18	23	24	18	5	18	2
Il Lombardia	15	10	15	4	4	32	9	25	31	14	16	27	7	1
Classics by highest finishing position
Classic	2013	2014	2015	2016	2017	2018	2019	2020	2021	2022	2023	2024	2025	2026
Omloop Het Nieuwsblad	12	25	21	5	7	18	10	7	19	3	19	4	13	6
Kuurne–Brussels–Kuurne	–	18	27	12	8	11	27	20	8	20	79	16	17	7
Strade Bianche	3	–	24	29	12	2	14	20	17	17	44	6	16	2
E3 Harelbeke	57	22	46	25	3	4	8	NH	4	21	18	18	12	4
Gent–Wevelgem	21	8	DNF	65	22	6	3	14	12	17	18	11	21	2
Amstel Gold Race	23	33	12	13	13	29	9	NH	18	2	21	5	38	43
La Flèche Wallonne	3	35	6	19	13	9	12	2	18	13	29	4	18	1
Clásica de San Sebastián	20	18	17	37	11	80	35	NH	28	14	20	11	14	10
Paris–Tours	7	22	17	63	6	3	3	2	4	17	27	13	4	

Legend
—	Did not compete
DNF	Did not finish
NH	Not held
