= List of Cofidis wins =

This comprehensive list of Cofidis wins accounts races won by the Cofidis cycling team. The races are categorised according to the UCI Continental Circuits rules.

== 1997 ==
Route Adélie de Vitré, Nicolas Jalabert
Overall Tour de l´Ain, Bobby Julich
Stage 2 Volta a la Comunidad Valenciana, Maurizio Fondriest
GP de la Ville de Rennes, Nicolas Jalabert
Gent–Wevelgem, Philippe Gaumont
Stage 11 Tour de France, Laurent Desbiens

== 1998 ==
Tour de l´Avenir, Christophe Rinero
Criterium d´Abruzzo, Francesco Casagrande
A Travers le Morbihan, Laurent Desbiens
Stage 8 Paris — Nice, Christophe Capelle
Overall Critérium International, Bobby Julich
Stage 3b KBC Driedaagse van De Panne — Koksijde, David Millar
Grand Prix de Plumelec-Morbihan, Laurent Desbiens
Trofeo Matteotti, Francesco Casagrande
Clasica Ciclista San Sebastián, Francesco Casagrande

== 1999 ==
Overall Tour de l´Ain, Grzegorz Gwiazdowski
Grand Prix d'Ouverture La Marseillaise, Frank Vandenbroucke
Omloop Het Volk/Nieuwsblad, Frank Vandenbroucke
Stage 4 Paris — Nice, Laurent Roux
Stage 7 Paris — Nice, Frank Vandenbroucke
Stage 3b KBC Driedaagse van De Panne — Koksijde, Frank Vandenbroucke
Liège — Bastogne — Liège, Frank Vandenbroucke
Trophée des Grimpeurs, Laurent Roux
Stage 4 Critérium du Dauphiné, Laurent Desbiens
Stage 6 Critérium du Dauphiné, david Moncoutie
Züri Metzgete, Grzegorz Gwiazdowski
Boucles de l´Aulne, Claude Lamour
Stages 16 & 19 Vuelta a España, Frank Vandenbroucke

== 2000 ==
Omloop van het Houtland Lichtervelde, Niko Eeckhout
Étoile de Bessèges, Jo Planckaert
Stage 5 Vuelta a Andalucía, Jo Planckaert
Grand Prix de Lillers Souvenir Bruno Comini, Francis Moreau
GP Rudy Dhaenens, Niko Eeckhout
Tro-Bro Léon, Jo Planckaert
Luxembourg Time Trial Championship, Steve Fogen
Stage 1 Tour de France, David Millar
Kampioenschap van Vlaanderen, Niko Eeckhout
Critérium de Oostrozebeke, Niko Eeckhout

== 2001 ==
Circuit Cycliste Sarthe — Pays de la Loire, David Millar
Circuit des Ardennes, Cédric Loue
GP Stad Kortrijk, Niko Eeckhout
Overall Étoile de Bessèges, Niko Eeckhout

Stage 1, Niko Eeckhout

Grand Prix de Lillers Souvenir Bruno Comini, Jean-Michel Tessier
Stage 2 Guldensporentweedaagse, Janek Tombak
Prologue Paris — Nice, Nico Mattan
Dwars door Vlaanderen, Niko Eeckhout
Overall KBC Driedaagse van De Panne — Koksijde, Nico Mattan

Stage 3b, Nico Mattan

Stage 4b Euskal Bizikleta, David Millar
Stage 5 Critérium du Dauphiné, Andreï Kivilev
Estonia Road Championship, Janek Tombak
Overall Tour of Denmark, David Millar

Stage 2, Niko Eeckhout
Stage 5, David Millar

GP Ouest France-Plouay, Nico Mattan
GP Jef Scherens Leuven, Niko Eeckhout
Delta Profronde, Niko Eeckhout
Stages 1 & 6 Vuelta a España, David Millar
Memorial Rik Van Steenbergen, Niko Eeckhout
Overall Circuit Franco-Belge, Chris Peers

Stage 1, Chris Peers
Stage 3, Niko Eeckhout

Critérium de Oostrozebeke, Chris Peers
Giro del Piemonte, Nico Mattan

== 2002 ==
Antwerpen na-tour Dernyspektakel, Nico Mattan
Clasica Internacional a Alcobendas, David Moncoutié
GP Stad Kortrijk, Jo Planckaert
Stage 2 Critérium International, David Moncoutié
Stage 2 Four Days of Dunkirk, Janek Tombak
Stage 5 Four Days of Dunkirk, Cédric Vasseur
Stage 7 Volta Ciclista a Catalunya, Dmitriy Fofonov
Stage 13 Tour de France, David Millar
Stage 4 Tour de l´Ain, Marek Rutkiewicz
Tour du Poitou Charentes et de la Vienne, Guido Trentin
Stage 5 Vuelta a España, Guido Trentin
Stage 3 Tour de Pologne, Janek Tombak
GP d´Isbergues, Cédric Vasseur

== 2003 ==
Omloop van de Vlaamse Scheldeboorden, Chris Peers
Paris–Corrèze, Cédric Vasseur
International Hessen Rundfahrt, Cédric Vasseur
Australia Road Championship, Stuart O'Grady
Stages 6 & 8 Tour de Langkawi, Stuart O'Grady
Stage 2 Étoile de Bessèges, Jo Planckaert
Stage 4 Tour Méditerranéen, David Moncoutié
Gran Premio di Lugano, David Moncoutié
Prologue Driedaagse West-Vlaanderen, David Millar
Prologue Paris — Nice, Nico Mattan
Tour de Picardie, David Millar
E.O.S Tallinn GP, Arnaud Coyot
Stage 7 Critérium du Dauphiné, Cédric Vasseur
Stage 1 Route du Sud, Janek Tombak
Stage 4 Route du Sud, David Moncoutié
Estonia Road Championship, Janek Tombak
Stage 19 Tour de France, David Millar
Stage 1 Tour de la Région Wallonne, Niko Eeckhout
Stage 4 Vuelta a Burgos, David Millar
Overall Tour du Limousin, Massimiliano

Stage 2, Cédric Vasseur

Tour du Poitou Charentes et de la Vienne, Robert Sassone
Stage 2 Vuelta a España, Luis Pérez Rodríguez
Memorial Rik Van Steenbergen, Niko Eeckhout
Stage 7 Tour de Pologne, Hayden Roulston
Stage 17 Vuelta a España, David Millar

== 2004 ==
Profronde van Made, Igor Astarloa
Gran Premio di Lugano, Frédéric Bessy
Stage 1 Four Days of Dunkirk, Jimmy Casper
Stage 4 Tour de Picardie, Jimmy Casper
GP de Villers Cotterêts, Stuart O'Grady
Stages 5 & 7 Critérium du Dauphiné, Stuart O'Grady
Stage 5 Tour de France, Stuart O'Grady
Stage 11 Tour de France, David Moncoutié
Stage 1 Brixia Tour, Igor Astarloa
Stage 1 Tour de la Région Wallonne, Hayden Roulston
Vattenfall Cyclassics, Stuart O'Grady
Stage 1 Tour of Denmark, Stuart O'Grady
Stage 3 Tour of Denmark, Janek Tombak
Stage 6 Tour of Denmark, Jimmy Casper
Stage 4 Tour de l´Ain, Cédric Vasseur
Stage 4 Tour du Limousin, Cédric Vasseur
Overall Circuit Franco-Belge, Jimmy Casper

Stage 2, Jimmy Casper

== 2005 ==
Stage 4 Tour Down Under, Matthew White
Stage 5 Étoile de Bessèges, Jimmy Casper
Stage 2 Vuelta Ciclista al Pais Vasco, David Moncoutié
Overall Circuit Cycliste Sarthe, Sylvain Chavanel

Stage 4, Sylvain Chavanel

Grand Prix de Denain Porte du Hainaut, Jimmy Casper
Tour de Picardie, Janek Tombak
E.O.S Tallinn GP, Janek Tombak
France Time Trial Championship, Sylvain Chavanel
Stage 12 Tour de France, David Moncoutié
Stage 4 Tour de la Région Wallonne, Guido Trentin
Stage 3 Tour du Limousin, Leonardo Bertagnolli
Châteauroux Classic de l´Indre Trophée Fenioux, Jimmy Casper
Tour du Poitou Charentes et de la Vienne, Sylvain Chavanel
Stage 2 Vuelta a España, Leonardo Bertagnolli

== 2006 ==
Tour du Haut Var, Leonardo Bertagnolli
Classic Haribo, Arnaud Coyot
Stage 6 Tirreno–Adriatico, Leonardo Bertagnolli
GP Cholet, Chris Sutton
Grand Prix de Denain, Jimmy Casper
Stage 7 Giro d'Italia, Rik Verbrugghe
Overall Tour de Picardie, Jimmy Casper

Stage 3, Jimmy Casper

France Time Trial Championships, Sylvain Chavanel
Stage 1 Tour de France, Jimmy Casper
Overall Tour du Limousin, Leonardo Duque

Stage 3, Stéphane Augé

Overall Tour du Poitou Charentes, Sylvain Chavanel
Stage 4 Tour de l'Avenir, Nicolas Roche
Stage 5 Tour de Pologne, Stéphane Augé

== 2007 ==
Overall Étoile de Bessèges, Nick Nuyens

Stage 3, Nick Nuyens

GP Cholet, Stéphane Augé
Stage 5 Circuit de la Sarthe, Chris Sutton
Stage 1 Four Days of Dunkirk, Bradley Wiggins
Prologue Critérium du Dauphiné Libéré, Bradley Wiggins
Stage 2 GP CTT Correios de Portugal, Tyler Farrar
Stage 3 Route du Sud, Amaël Moinard
Prologue Eneco Tour, Michiel Elijzen
Stage 1 Eneco Tour, Nick Nuyens
Châteauroux Classic, Chris Sutton
Stage 1 Tour du Poitou-Charentes, Chris Sutton
Stage 4 Tour du Poitou-Charentes, Bradley Wiggins
Stage 16 Vuelta a España, Leonardo Duque
Duo Normand, Bradley Wiggins & Michiel Elijzen

== 2008 ==
Grand Prix d'Ouverture La Marseillaise, Hervé Duclos-Lassalle
Stage 4 Tour Méditerranéen, Leonardo Duque
Stage 5 Tour Méditerranéen, Sylvain Chavanel
Stage 6 Paris–Nice, Sylvain Chavanel
Dwars door Vlaanderen, Sylvain Chavanel
Brabantse Pijl, Sylvain Chavanel
Stage 2 Circuit de la Sarthe, Samuel Dumoulin
Overall Four Days of Dunkirk, Stéphane Augé

Stage 1, Stéphane Augé

Stage 3 Tour de Picardie, Jean-Eudes Demaret
Stage 5 Volta a Catalunya, Sylvain Chavanel
France Time Trial Championships, Sylvain Chavanel
Stage 3 Tour de France, Samuel Dumoulin
Stage 19 Tour de France, Sylvain Chavanel
Stage 7 Deutschland Tour, Stéphane Augé
Stage 8 Vuelta a España, David Moncoutié
Mountains classification in the Vuelta a España, David Moncoutié
Stages 2 & 5 Tour du Poitou-Charentes, Samuel Dumoulin

== 2009 ==
Grand Prix d'Ouverture La Marseillaise, Rémi Pauriol
Stage 5 Étoile de Bessèges, Jean-Eudes Demaret
Stage 6 Tour Méditerranéen, David Moncoutié
Gran Premio di Lugano, Rémi Pauriol
Stage 1 Tirreno–Adriatico, Julien El Fares
Stage 5 Circuit de la Sarthe, Jean-Eudes Demaret
Stage 7 Critérium du Dauphiné Libéré, David Moncoutié
Estonia Road Race Championships, Rein Taaramäe
Estonia Time Trial Championships, Rein Taaramäe
Overall Tour de Wallonie, Julien El Fares
Overall Tour de l'Ain, Rein Taaramäe

Stage 1, Mickaël Buffaz
Stage 4, Rein Taaramäe

Stage 2 Tour du Limousin, Samuel Dumoulin
Stage 13 Vuelta a España, David Moncoutié
Mountains classification in the Vuelta a España, David Moncoutié

== 2010 ==
Stage 2 La Tropicale Amissa Bongo, Samuel Dumoulin
Overall Étoile de Bessèges, Samuel Dumoulin

Stage 3, Samuel Dumoulin

Stage 4 Tour Méditerranéen, Julien El Fares
Gran Premio dell'Insubria-Lugano, Samuel Dumoulin
Le Samyn, Jens Keukeleire
Overall Driedaagse van West-Vlaanderen, Jens Keukeleire

Stage 1, Jens Keukeleire

Stage 7 Paris–Nice, Amaël Moinard
Nokere Koerse, Jens Keukeleire
GP Cholet, Leonardo Duque
Stage 6 Volta a Catalunya, Samuel Dumoulin
Stage 4 Circuit de la Sarthe, Samuel Dumoulin
Paris–Camembert, Sébastien Minard
Stage 17 Giro d'Italia, Damien Monier
Stage 3 Tour de Luxembourg, Tony Gallopin
Overall Route du Sud, David Moncoutié

Stage 2b, David Moncoutié

Estonia Road Race Championships, Kalle Kriit
Overall Paris–Corrèze, Mickaël Buffaz

Stage 1, Mickaël Buffaz

Stage 8 Vuelta a España, David Moncoutié
Mountains classification in the Vuelta a España, David Moncoutié

== 2011 ==
Stage 3 Étoile de Bessèges, Samuel Dumoulin
Overall La Méditerranéenne, David Moncoutié

Stage 5, David Moncoutié

Stage 1 Tour du Haut Var, Samuel Dumoulin
Stages 5 & 7 Volta a Catalunya, Samuel Dumoulin
Flèche d'Emeraude, Tony Gallopin
Tartu GP, Jean-Eudes Demaret
Stage 4 Route du Sud, Luis Ángel Maté
Estonia Time Trial Championships, Rein Taaramäe
Stage 3 Tour of Austria, Jens Keukeleire
Overall Paris–Corrèze, Samuel Dumoulin

Stage 1, Samuel Dumoulin

Stage 2 Danmark Rundt, Remy Cusin
Overall Tour de l'Ain, David Moncoutié
Stage 2 Tour du Limousin, Tony Gallopin
Stage 11 Vuelta a España, David Moncoutié
Stage 14 Vuelta a España, Rein Taaramäe
Mountains classification in the Vuelta a España, David Moncoutié

== 2012 ==
Latvia Road Race Championships, Aleksejs Saramotins
Estonia Time Trial Championships, Rein Taaramäe
Grand Prix d'Ouverture La Marseillaise, Samuel Dumoulin
Stage 3 Vuelta a Asturias, Rémy Di Gregorio
Stage 2 Boucles de la Mayenne, Nico Sijmens
Overall Paris–Corrèze, Egoitz García

== 2013 ==
Stage 4 La Tropicale Amissa Bongo, Adrien Petit
Vuelta a Murcia, Daniel Navarro
Classic Loire Atlantique, Edwig Cammaerts
Overall Rhône-Alpes Isère Tour, Nico Sijmens

Stage 3, Nico Sijmens

Overall Tour of Estonia, Gert Jõeäär
Estonia Road Race Championships, Rein Taaramäe
Mountains classification in the Vuelta a España, Nicolas Edet
Overall Tour du Gévaudan, Yoann Bagot

Stage 1, Yoann Bagot

== 2014 ==
France National U23 Cyclo-cross championships, Clément Venturini
Overall Driedaagse van West-Vlaanderen, Gert Jõeäär

Prologue, Gert Jõeäär

Tro-Bro Léon, Adrien Petit
Stage 3 Tour of Turkey, Rein Taaramäe
Stage 3 Rhône-Alpes Isère Tour, Nicolas Edet
Stage 4 Rhône-Alpes Isère Tour, Clément Venturini
Grand Prix de Plumelec-Morbihan, Julien Simon
Estonia Time Trial Championships, Gert Jõeäär
Stage 13 Vuelta a España, Daniel Navarro
Tour du Doubs, Rein Taaramäe

== 2015 ==
Stages 1 & 4 Circuit de la Sarthe, Nacer Bouhanni
Grand Prix de Denain, Nacer Bouhanni
Stage 2 Four Days of Dunkirk, Jonas Ahlstrand
Prologue Tour de Luxembourg, Adrien Petit
Overall Boucles de la Mayenne, Anthony Turgis

Stage 2, Anthony Turgis

Stages 2 & 4 Critérium du Dauphiné, Nacer Bouhanni
Halle–Ingooigem, Nacer Bouhanni
Estonia Time Trial Championships, Gert Jõeäär
Estonia Road Race Championships, Gert Jõeäär
Circuito de Getxo, Nacer Bouhanni
Stages 1 & 2 Tour de l'Ain, Nacer Bouhanni
Stage 3 Tour du Limousin, Rudy Molard
Grand Prix d'Isbergues, Nacer Bouhanni
Tour de Vendée, Christophe Laporte,
Stage 4 Tour de l'Eurométropole, Jonas Ahlstrand
Nationale Sluitingsprijs, Nacer Bouhanni

== 2016 ==
Stage 2 Vuelta a Andalucía, Nacer Bouhanni
Stage 4 Paris–Nice, Nacer Bouhanni
Classic Loire Atlantique, Anthony Turgis
Stages 1 & 2 Volta a Catalunya, Nacer Bouhanni
Stage 1 Critérium du Dauphiné, Nacer Bouhanni
Estonia Time Trial Championships, Gert Jõeäär
Stage 2 Tour of Austria, Clément Venturini
Tour de Vendée, Nacer Bouhanni

== 2017 ==
France National Cyclo-cross championships, Clément Venturini
Stage 2 Tour du Haut Var, Julien Simon
Nokere Koerse, Nacer Bouhanni
Stage 4 Volta a Catalunya, Nacer Bouhanni
Paris–Camembert, Nacer Bouhanni
Stage 2 Tour de Yorkshire, Nacer Bouhanni
Overall Four Days of Dunkirk, Clément Venturini
Stage 3 Tour de Luxembourg, Anthony Perez
Stage 6 Tour of Austria, Clément Venturini
Stage 2 Tour de l'Ain, Nacer Bouhanni

== 2018 ==
Stage 2 Étoile de Bessèges, Christophe Laporte
Stages 1 & 3 Tour La Provence, Christophe Laporte
Tro-Bro Léon, Christophe Laporte
Stage 4 Tour de Yorkshire, Stéphane Rossetto
Overall 4 Jours de Dunkerque, Dimitri Claeys

Stage 3, Nacer Bouhanni

Stage 1 Tour de l'Ain, Hugo Hofstetter
Grote Prijs Marcel Kint, Nacer Bouhanni
Stage 3 (ITT) Belgium Tour, Christophe Laporte
Prologue Boucles de la Mayenne, Dorian Godon
Stage 1 Tour de Luxembourg, Christophe Laporte
Stages 2 & 3 Boucles de la Mayenne, Nacer Bouhanni
Stage 4 Tour de Luxembourg, Anthony Perez
Stage 1 Route d'Occitanie, Nacer Bouhanni
Eritrea Time Trial Championships, Daniel Teklehaimanot
Overall Tour du Limousin, Nicolas Edet

Stage 3, Nicolas Edet

Stage 6 Vuelta a España, Nacer Bouhanni
Tour du Doubs, Julien Simon

== 2019 ==
Trofeo Campos, Porreres, Felanitx, Ses Salines, Jesús Herrada
Overall Étoile de Bessèges, Christophe Laporte

Stages 2 & 4 (ITT), Christophe Laporte

Tour du Finistère, Julien Simon
Overall Tour de Luxembourg, Jesús Herrada

Prologue & Stage 1, Christophe Laporte
Stages 3 & 4, Jesús Herrada

Mont Ventoux Dénivelé Challenge, Jesús Herrada
Dwars door het Hageland, Kenneth Vanbilsen
Eritrea Road Race Championships, Natnael Berhane
Schaal Sels, Attilio Viviani
Overall Tour Poitou-Charentes en Nouvelle-Aquitaine, Christophe Laporte

Stages 1, 2 & 4 (ITT), Christophe Laporte

Stage 6 Vuelta a España, Jesús Herrada
La DH Famenne Ardenne Classic, Dimitri Claeys

== 2020 ==
Stage 1 La Tropicale Amissa Bongo, Attilio Viviani
Stage 1 Tour du Haut Var, Anthony Perez
Mountains classification Vuelta a España, Guillaume Martin

== 2021 ==
Stage 1 Étoile de Bessèges, Christophe Laporte
Cholet-Pays de Loire, Elia Viviani
Circuit de Wallonie, Christophe Laporte
Trofeo Serra de Tramuntana, Jesús Herrada
Stage 8 Giro d'Italia, Victor Lafay
Mercan'Tour Classic Alpes-Maritimes, Guillaume Martin
Stage 1 Tour de Limousin, Christophe Laporte
Stages 1 & 3 Tour Poitou-Charentes en Nouvelle-Aquitaine, Elia Viviani
Grand Prix de Fourmies, Elia Viviani
Grand Prix de Wallonie, Christophe Laporte
Grand Prix d'Isbergues, Elia Viviani

== 2022 ==
Overall Étoile de Bessèges, Benjamin Thomas

Stage 2, Bryan Coquard
Stage 3, Benjamin Thomas

Stage 2 Tour de la Provence, Bryan Coquard
Grand Prix de Denain, Max Walscheid
Classic Loire Atlantique, Anthony Perez
Route Adélie, Axel Zingle
Stage 6 Tour of the Basque Country, Ion Izagirre
Classic Grand Besançon Doubs, Jesús Herrada
Overall Boucles de la Mayenne, Benjamin Thomas

Stage 2, Benjamin Thomas

Overall Tour de l'Ain, Guillaume Martin

Stage 2, Guillaume Martin

Stage 1 Arctic Race of Norway, Axel Zingle
Stage 3 Arctic Race of Norway, Victor Lafay
Stage 7 Vuelta a España, Jesús Herrada
Paris–Chauny, Simone Consonni
Famenne Ardenne Classic, Axel Zingle
Tour de Vendée, Bryan Coquard

== 2023 ==
Stage 4 Tour Down Under, Bryan Coquard
Stage 5 Saudi Tour, Simone Consonni
Stage 2 Tour of Oman, Jesús Herrada
Faun Drôme Classic, Anthony Perez
Classic Loire Atlantique, Axel Zingle
GP Miguel Induráin, Ion Izagirre
Stages 1 & 3 Région Pays de la Loire Tour, Bryan Coquard
Classic Grand Besançon Doubs, Victor Lafay
Tour du Doubs, Jesús Herrada
Stage 3 (ITT) Four Days of Dunkirk, Benjamin Thomas
Stage 2 Tour de France, Victor Lafay
Stage 12 Tour de France, Ion Izagirre
Stage 11 Vuelta a España, Jesús Herrada

== 2024 ==
Stage 5 Giro d'Italia, Benjamin Thomas
Boucles de l'Aulne, Axel Zingle
Stage 1 Four Days of Dunkirk, Milan Fretin
Stage 2 Tour de Suisse, Bryan Coquard
Stage 2 Tour Poitou-Charentes en Nouvelle Aquitaine, Milan Fretin

== 2025 ==
Stage 4 Tour Down Under, Bryan Coquard
Grand Prix La Marseillaise, Valentin Ferron
Clásica de Almería, Milan Fretin
Stage 4 Volta ao Algarve, Milan Fretin
Stage 3 Tour of the Basque Country, Alex Aranburu
Ronde van Limburg, Milan Fretin

== 2026 ==
Grand Prix La Marseillaise, Bryan Coquard
Stage 3 Vuelta a Andalucía, Milan Fretin
Visit South Aegean Islands, Bryan Coquard
GP Miguel Indurain, Ion Izagirre
Stage 4 Tour of the Basque Country, Alex Aranburu
Stage 4 Tour of Turkiye, Stanisław Aniołkowski
Stage 3 Tour of Belgium, Alex Aranburu
Luxembourg National Championships ITT, Alex Kirsch
Polynormande, Hugo Page
Stage 1 Tour Poitou-Charentes en Nouvelle-Aquitaine, Milan Fretin
Stage 4 Tour Poitou-Charentes en Nouvelle-Aquitaine, Milan Fretin
Stage 8 Vuelta a Espana, Bryan Coquard
Bretagne Classic. Alex Aranburu
Memorial Marco Pantani. Ion Izagirre

== Supplementary statistics ==
=== 1997 to 2017 ===
Grand Tours by highest finishing position
Race	1997	1998	1999	2000	2001	2002	2003	2004	2005	2006	2007	2008	2009	2010	2011	2012	2013	2014	2015	2016	2017
Giro d'Italia	–	–	–	–	–	–	–	–	14	16	13	111	–	63	–	–	–	–	–	–	–
Tour de France	17	3	15	22	4	13	15	34	44	42	DNF	14	36	24	11	36	9	31	43	55	27
Vuelta a España	30	17	12	–	13	15	10	9	17	10	11	8	18	14	36	45	21	10	30	22	24
Major week-long stage races by highest finishing position
Race	1997	1998	1999	2000	2001	2002	2003	2004	2005	2006	2007	2008	2009	2010	2011	2012	2013	2014	2015	2016	2017
Tour Down Under	Did not Exist		–	–	–	–	–	–	3	–	–	5	38	–	–	–	–	–	–	–	–
Paris–Nice	34	17	4	22	4	4	52	33	35	15	17	8	31	7	4	87	12	32	13	11	31
Tirreno–Adriatico	18	23	45	17	17	6	28	4	43	64	13	27	14	–	–	–	–	–	–	–	–
Volta a Catalunya	–	–	–	–	–	14	7	10	3	40	31	33	37	3	38	29	16	14	25	13	14
Tour of the Basque Country	–	17	–	–	–	17	32	22	18	18	28	5	18	–	–	–	21	–	26	21	17
Tour de Romandie	28	3	13	8	9	10	8	–	9	29	51	23	3	–	–	–	–	–	–	–	–
Critérium du Dauphiné	11	18	25	38	5	5	3	11	6	12	10	9	11	26	12	30	5	9	16	11	17
Tour de Suisse	35	5	41	11	12	–	–	–	13	50	21	32	8	–	–	–	–	–	–	–	–
Tour de Pologne	–	–	–	–	–	3	5	–	9	7	14	41	40	–	–	–	–	–	–	–	–
Eneco Tour	–	–	–	–	–	–	–	–	16	32	23	61	29	–	13	–	–	–	–	60	–
Monument races by highest finishing position
Monument	1997	1998	1999	2000	2001	2002	2003	2004	2005	2006	2007	2008	2009	2010	2011	2012	2013	2014	2015	2016	2017
Milan–San Remo	65	29	48	6	19	4	24	3	4	30	15	19	91	–	37	–	–	–	6	4	8
Tour of Flanders	42	12	2	23	6	11	5	34	16	26	7	2	96	–	19	–	–	48	90	–	40
Paris–Roubaix	12	15	7	29	9	9	19	–	10	10	16	15	29	46	29	18	29	28	17	20	12
Liège–Bastogne–Liège	45	4	1	12	21	14	53	–	39	31	41	48	27	35	57	–	71	16	17	18	18
Giro di Lombardia	23	42	46	20	27	16	2	17	17	4	26	31	43	28	–	–	–	–	–	17	41
Classics by highest finishing position
Classic	1997	1998	1999	2000	2001	2002	2003	2004	2005	2006	2007	2008	2009	2010	2011	2012	2013	2014	2015	2016	2017
Omloop Het Nieuwsblad	13	36	1	11	25	9	7	–	17	14	4	2	30	16	23	39	10	9	24	17	36
Kuurne–Brussels–Kuurne	–	12	13	5	3	5	14	4	13	16	9	97	49	19	9	14	–	23	18	3	33
Strade Bianche	Did not Exist										–	22	–	–	–	–	–	–	–	–	–
E3 Harelbeke	33	38	3	3	4	2	9	36	11	14	16	10	DNF	78	17	4	45	14	–	–	–
Gent–Wevelgem	1	5	13	5	5	27	34	5	10	21	23	11	32	–	12	23	24	16	19	31	15
Amstel Gold Race	71	15	25	25	10	7	48	–	56	18	28	28	57	–	30	–	–	–	–	–	–
La Flèche Wallonne	63	22	29	6	48	14	30	–	45	49	43	57	33	18	29	–	–	18	21	14	48
Clásica de San Sebastián	4	1	55	10	24	4	36	12	6	5	51	10	87	–	–	–	–	–	25	20	28
Paris–Tours	29	7	11	12	14	8	48	5	30	16	15	24	22	21	21	37	11	9	42	7	22

=== 2018 to present ===
Grand Tours by highest finishing position
Race	2018	2019	2020	2021	2022	2023
Giro d'Italia	–	–	44	110	14	35
Tour de France	43	20	11	8	40	10
Vuelta a España	21	18	14	9	53	28
Major week-long stage races by highest finishing position
Race	2018	2019	2020	2021	2022	2023
Tour Down Under	–	–	14	NH		10
Paris–Nice	24	40	12	6	7	21
Tirreno–Adriatico	–	31	74	135	16	21
Volta a Catalunya	40	16	NH	20	8	17
Tour of the Basque Country	14	33	NH	16	2	3
Tour de Romandie	–	–	NH	22	3	30
Critérium du Dauphiné	9	20	3	20	38	6
Tour de Suisse	–	–	NH	54	23	12
Tour de Pologne	27	15	18	20	36	27
BinckBank Tour	–	–	31	23	NH	8
Monument races by highest finishing position
Monument	2018	2019	2020	2021	2022	2023
Milan–San Remo	13	23	39	22	28	48
Tour of Flanders	35	92	6	11	48	38
Paris–Roubaix	43	19	NH	6	65	8
Liège–Bastogne–Liège	17	24	14	15	27	6
Il Lombardia	–	44	15	44	25	40
Classics by highest finishing position
Classic	2018	2019	2020	2021	2022	2023
Omloop Het Nieuwsblad	7	31	42	13	41	12
Kuurne–Brussels–Kuurne	18	11	17	44	21	13
Strade Bianche	–	–	–	79	–	47
E3 Harelbeke	–	68	NH	21	101	53
Gent–Wevelgem	4	39	25	62	20	7
Amstel Gold Race	–	–	NH	16	49	10
La Flèche Wallonne	23	24	15	16	16	6
Clásica de San Sebastián	5	16	NH	21	18	5
Paris–Tours	39	45	39	15	4	19

Legend
—	Did not compete
DNF	Did not finish
NH	Not held
