= 1998 UCI Road World Championships – Men's road race =

Men's Individual Road Race
1998 UCI Road World Championships
- Rainbow jersey

Race details
- Dates: October 11, 1998
- Stages: 1
- Distance: 258 km (160 mi)
- Winning time: 06h 01' 30"

Medalists
	Gold	Oskar Camenzind (SUI)	(Switzerland)
	Silver	Peter Van Petegem (BEL)	(Belgium)
	Bronze	Michele Bartoli (ITA)	(Italy)

The men's road race at the 1998 UCI Road World Championships was held on Sunday October 11, 1998, in Valkenburg, Netherlands, over a total distance of 258 kilometres (15 laps). There were a total number of 153 starters, with 66 cyclists finishing the race.

Lance Armstrong's fourth-place finish was stripped by USADA in 2012 due to doping.

== Final classification ==
Rank	Rider	Time
1st place, gold medalist(s)	Oskar Camenzind (SUI)	06:01:30
2nd place, silver medalist(s)	Peter Van Petegem (BEL)	+ 00.23
3rd place, bronze medalist(s)	Michele Bartoli (ITA)	+ 00.24
DSQ	~~Lance Armstrong~~ (USA)	~~+ 01.08~~
5.	Niki Aebersold (SUI)	+ 01.09
6.	Michael Boogerd (NED)	+ 01.10
7.	Marc Wauters (BEL)	+ 04.31
8.	Andrea Tafi (ITA)	+ 04.44
9.	Raimondas Rumšas (LTU)	—
10.	Udo Bolts (GER)	—
11.	Romāns Vainšteins (LAT)	—
12.	Emmanuel Magnien (FRA)	+ 05.02
13.	José García Acosta (ESP)	+ 05.23
14.	Andrei Zintchenko (RUS)	+ 11.11
15.	Lauri Aus (EST)	+ 14.45
16.	Jacky Durand (FRA)	+ 14.46
17.	Óscar Freire (ESP)	—
18.	Martin Hvastija (SLO)	—
19.	Andrei Kivilev (KAZ)	—
20.	Jaan Kirsipuu (EST)	—
21.	Mario Aerts (BEL)	—
22.	Sergei Ivanov (RUS)	—
23.	Alexander Vinokourov (KAZ)	—
24.	Maarten den Bakker (NED)	—
25.	Torsten Schmidt (GER)	—
26.	Serguei Gontchar (UKR)	—
27.	Mikael Holst (DEN)	—
28.	Gorazd Štangelj (SLO)	—
29.	Rolf Aldag (GER)	—
30.	Zbigniew Piątek (POL)	—
31.	Grzegorz Gwiazdowski (POL)	—
32.	Chann McRae (USA)	—
33.	Beat Zberg (SUI)	—
34.	Serguei Smetanine (RUS)	—
35.	Mauro Gianetti (SUI)	—
36.	François Simon (FRA)	—
37.	Max van Heeswijk (NED)	—
38.	Henk Vogels (AUS)	—
39.	Ludo Dierckxens (BEL)	—
40.	Claus Michael Møller (DEN)	—
41.	Steven de Jongh (NED)	—
42.	Luca Scinto (ITA)	—
43.	Pascal Richard (SUI)	—
44.	Zbigniew Spruch (POL)	—
45.	José Luis Rubiera (ESP)	—
46.	Cédric Vasseur (FRA)	—
47.	Gianni Faresin (ITA)	—
48.	Koos Moerenhout (NED)	—
49.	Andrei Tchmil (BEL)	—
50.	Rolf Sørensen (DEN)	—
51.	Gianni Bugno (ITA)	—
52.	Nico Mattan (BEL)	—
53.	Tristan Hoffman (NED)	—
54.	Davide Rebellin (ITA)	—
55.	Fabrice Gougot (FRA)	—
56.	Pascal Chanteur (FRA)	—
57.	Daniele Nardello (ITA)	—
58.	Melcior Mauri (ESP)	—
59.	Felice Puttini (SUI)	—
60.	Jean-Cyril Robin (FRA)	—
61.	Wilfried Peeters (BEL)	—
62.	Léon van Bon (NED)	—
63.	Paolo Bettini (ITA)	—
64.	Servais Knaven (NED)	—
65.	Aart Vierhouten (NED)	+ 24.29
66.	Artur Krzeszowiec (POL)	+ 24.30

== Non-finishers ==
Did not finish

- Christophe Bassons (FRA)
- Frédéric Guesdon (FRA)
- Xavier Jan (FRA)
- Anthony Langella (FRA)
- Pascal Lino (FRA)
- Bo Hamburger (DEN)
- Frank Høj (DEN)
- Brian Holm (DEN)
- Allan Johansen (DEN)
- Danny Jonasson (DEN)
- Nicolaj Bo Larsen (DEN)
- Peter Meinert Nielsen (DEN)
- Lars Michaelsen (DEN)
- Jesper Skibby (DEN)
- Marc Lotz (NED)
- Danny Nelissen (NED)
- Bart Voskamp (NED)
- Bert Dietz (GER)
- Sascha Henrix (GER)
- Danilo Hondo (GER)
- Kai Hundertmarck (GER)
- Andre Korff (GER)
- Thomas Liese (GER)
- Grischa Niermann (GER)
- Jan Schaffrath (GER)
- Jens Voigt (GER)
- Manuel Beltrán (ESP)
- David Etxebarria (ESP)
- Félix García (ESP)
- Álvaro González (ESP)
- Roberto Heras (ESP)
- Jon Odriozola (ESP)
- David Plaza (ESP)
- José Ramón Uriarte (ESP)
- Franz Hotz (SUI)
- Rolf Järmann (SUI)
- Fabian Jeker (SUI)
- Roland Meier (SUI)
- Daniel Schnider (SUI)
- Markus Zberg (SUI)
- Andres Lauk (EST)
- Peep Mikli (EST)
- Chris Peers (BEL)
- Jo Planckaert (BEL)
- Tom Steels (BEL)
- Erwin Thijs (BEL)
- Kurt Van De Wouwer (BEL)
- Michael Andersson (SWE)
- Niklas Axelsson (SWE)
- Magnus Bäckstedt (SWE)
- Glenn Magnusson (SWE)
- Mirko Celestino (ITA)
- Massimo Donati (ITA)
- Stefano Zanini (ITA)
- Tim Christopher (AUS)
- Bradley McGee (AUS)
- Vladimir Duma (UKR)
- Viatcheslav Djavanian (RUS)
- Andrey Dolgih (RUS)
- Oleg Yukov (RUS)
- Vitali Kokorine (RUS)
- Vladimir Lelekine (RUS)
- Alexei Sivakov (RUS)
- Yuri Sourkov (RUS)
- Piotr Ugrumov (RUS)
- Dylan Casey (USA)
- David Clinger (USA)
- Christopher Horner (USA)
- Trent Klasna (USA)
- Christian Vande Velde (USA)
- Jonathan Vaughters (USA)
- Dariusz Baranowski (POL)
- Tomasz Brożyna (POL)
- Piotr Przydział (POL)
- Andrzej Sypytkowski (POL)
- Roger Hammond (GBR)
- Dainis Ozols (LAT)
- Filip Branko (SLO)
- Joaquim Andrade (POR)
- José Azevedo (POR)
- Vítor Gamito (POR)
- Andrey Mizurov (KAZ)
- Yoshiyuki Abe (JPN)
- Kurt Asle Arvesen (NOR)
- Glen Mitchell (NZL)
- Jesús Zárate (MEX)

Did not start

- Filippo Simeoni (ITA)

== External sources ==
- Results
