= Michele Bartoli =

Italian cyclist

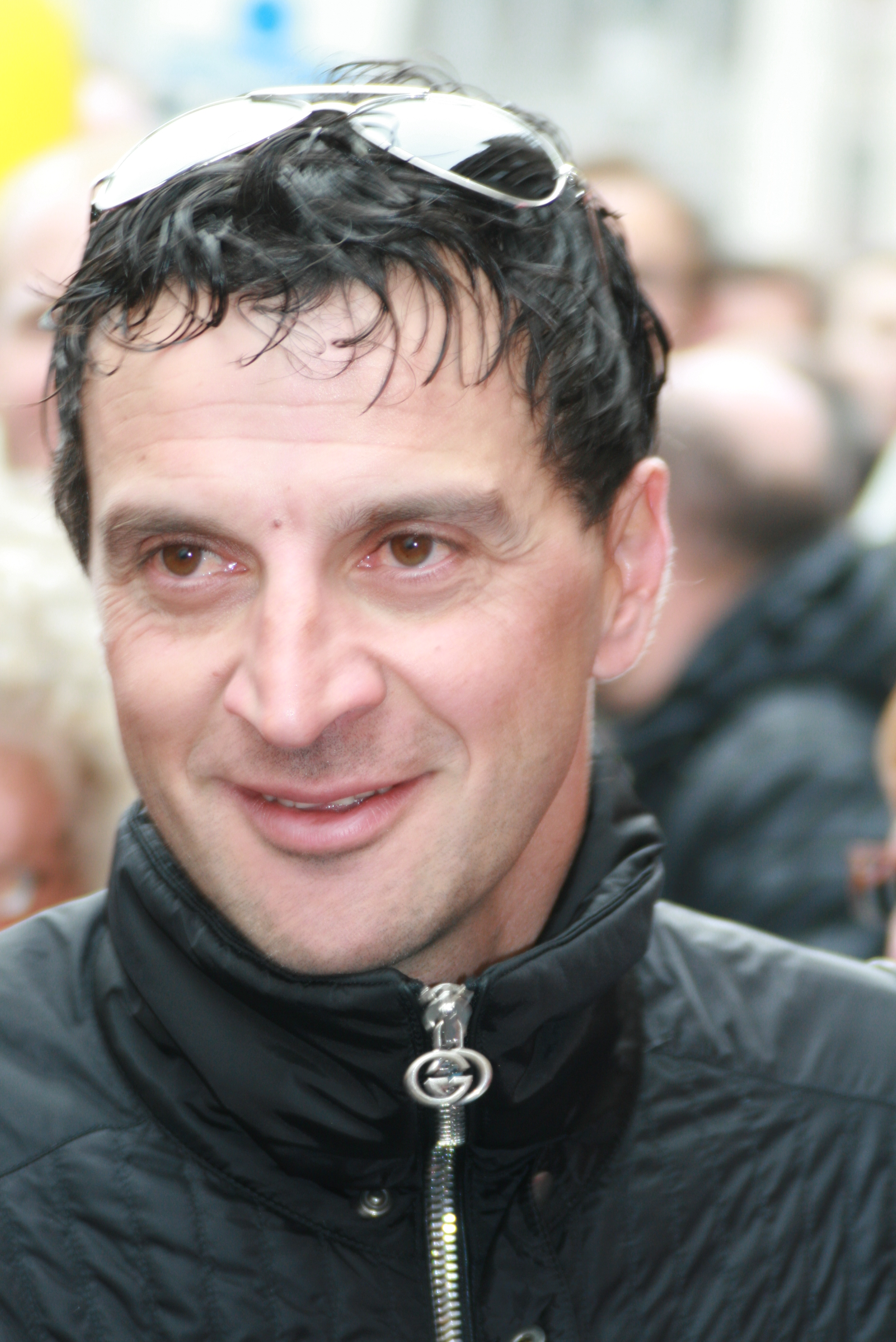
- Bartoli at the 2009 Tour of Flanders

Personal information
- Full name: Michele Bartoli
- Nicknames: Il Leoncino delle Fiandre (in Italian) (The Little Lion of Flanders) (in English)
- Born: 27 May 1970 (age 56) Pisa, Italy
- Height: 1.79 m (5 ft 10 in)
- Weight: 65 kg (143 lb; 10 st 3 lb)

Cycling career
- Sport: Cycling
- Discipline: Road
- Role: Rider
- Rider type: Classics specialist

Professional teams
- 1992–1995: Mercatone Uno–Medeghini–Zucchini
- 1996–1997: MG–Technogym
- 1998: Asics–CGA
- 1999–2001: Mapei-Quick Step
- 2002–2003: Fassa Bortolo
- 2004: Team CSC

Major wins
- Grand Tours Giro d'Italia 2 individual stages (1994, 1998) Stage races Three Days of De Panne (1995, 1998) Tirreno–Adriatico (1999) One-day races and Classics National Road Race Championships (2000) Giro di Lombardia (2002, 2003) Liège–Bastogne–Liège (1997, 1998) Tour of Flanders (1996) La Flèche Wallonne (1999) Amstel Gold Race (2002) Rund um den Henninger Turm (1997) Brabantse Pijl (1994, 1999) Giro dell'Emilia (1996, 2002) Züri-Metzgete (1998) GP Ouest-France (2000) Omloop Het Volk (2001) Milano–Torino (2002) Giro del Lazio (2003) Other UCI Road World Cup (1997, 1998)
Medal record
Representing Italy
Men's road bicycle racing
World Championships
Bronze medal – third place	1996 Lugano	Elite Men's Road Race
Bronze medal – third place	1998 Valkenburg	Elite Men's Road Race

Michele Bartoli (born 27 May 1970, in Pisa) is a retired Italian road racing cyclist. Bartoli was a professional cyclist from 1992 until 2004 and was one of the most successful single-day classics specialists of his generation, especially in the Italian and Belgian races. On his palmarès are three of the five monuments of cycling—five in total: the 1996 Tour of Flanders, the 1997 and 1998 Liège–Bastogne–Liège and the 2002 and 2003 Giro di Lombardia. He won the UCI Road World Cup in 1997 and 1998. From 10 October 1998 until 6 June 1999, Bartoli was number one on the UCI Road World Rankings.

Considered one of the most versatile riders of his generation, Bartoli won a variety of classics. He won most of the major Italian one-day races—apart from Milan–San Remo—and was Italian national champion in 2000. In Belgium, he excelled in both the cobbled classics of Flanders and the hilly races in the Ardennes, which earned him the nickname Il Leoncino delle Fiandre ("The Little Lion of Flanders"). In addition to the classics, Bartoli has also won stage races, such as Tirreno–Adriatico and the Three Days of De Panne, and won two stages in the Giro d'Italia. He finished third in the world championships of 1996 and 1998.

== Career ==
=== 1993–1995: Mercatone Uno ===
Bartoli joined Mercatone Uno–Medeghini–Zucchini as an amateur stagiaire in late 1992, signing his first professional contract starting in January 1993. He was competitive immediately, winning the overall and 3 stages at the first stage race he started, the 1993 Settimana Siciliana.

His breakthrough year was 1994, when he won the Brabantse Pijl, his first semi-classic win, and the thirteenth stage in the Giro d'Italia. In 1995, his star rose to prominence in the one-day classics, with fifth place in Milan–San Remo, seventh in the Tour of Flanders and third places in Liège–Bastogne–Liège and the Giro di Lombardia. He won the Three Days of De Panne and placed ninth overall in the Vuelta a España.

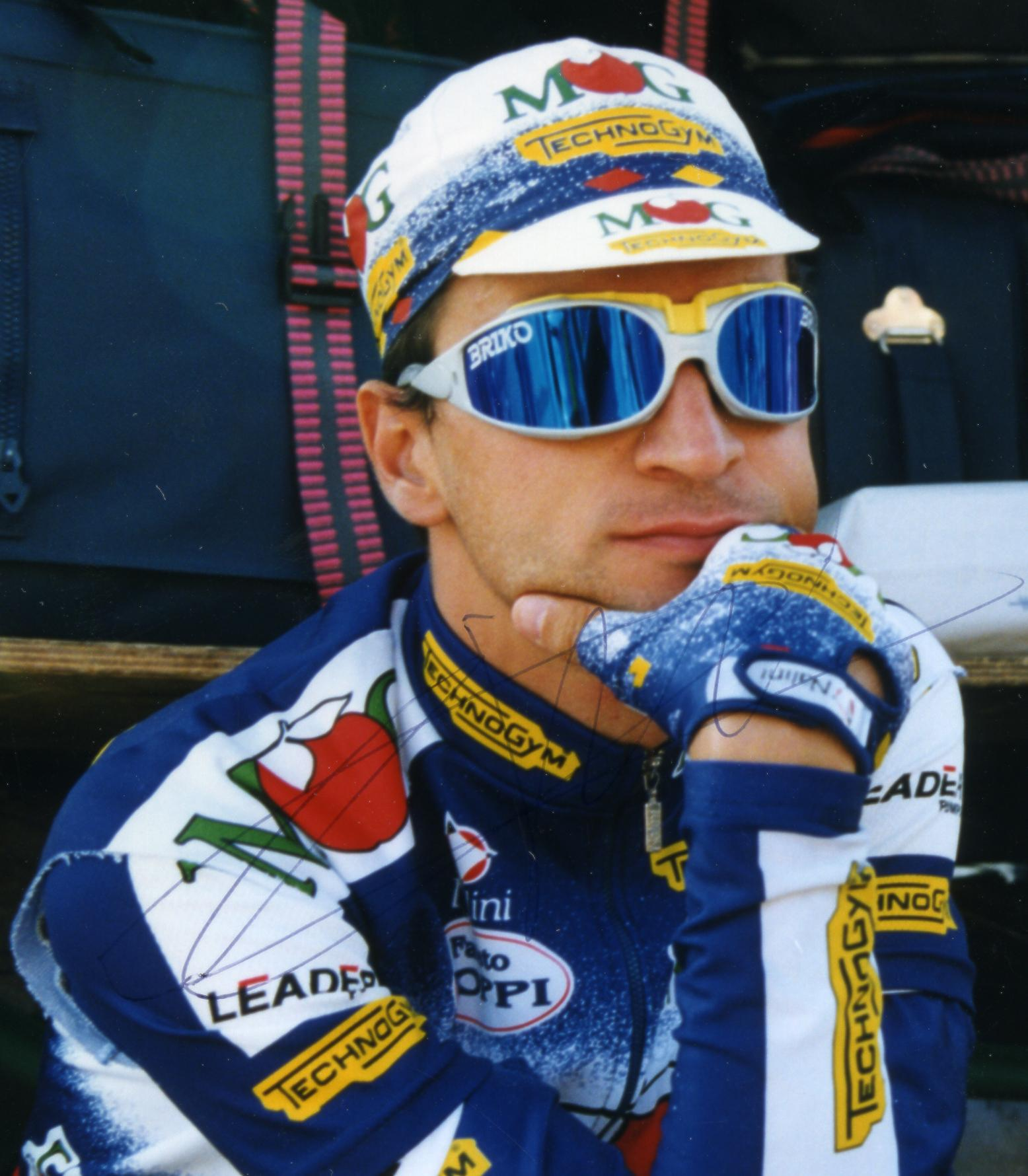
Bartoli won the UCI Road World Cup in 1997 and 1998. (pictured at the 1997 Paris–Tours)

=== 1996–1997: MG–Technogym ===
In 1996, he joined the MG–Technogym team of manager Giancarlo Ferretti. He became a specialist of the classic races and claimed his first career monument win in the 1996 Tour of Flanders after an attack on the Muur van Geraardsbergen and a 16 km solo to the finish. In summer, he was 19th overall in the Tour de France, before winning the Italian summer classics Giro del Veneto, GP di Larciano and Giro dell'Emilia. He finished third at the World Championships in Lugano behind Johan Museeuw and Mauro Gianetti.

In 1997, Bartoli won his first Liège–Bastogne–Liège, after distancing his last breakaway companion, Laurent Jalabert, in the final kilometre. His slender build (179 cm and 65 kg), combined with his feline ability to accelerate on steep climbs, made him the quintessential contender for the hilly Ardennes classics. At the end of 1997, he won the UCI World Cup, confirming his status as the most regular classic race specialist.

=== 1998: World number one with Asics ===
In 1998, he transferred to the Asics team and had the most successful season of his career. He won his second Liège–Bastogne–Liège, again before Laurent Jalabert, after a long solo attack. In May, he won the GP of Aargau Canton in Switzerland and the thirteenth stage in the Giro d'Italia. Later in the year, he won Züri-Metzgete, his second World Cup race of 1998, as well as the Giro di Romagna, and finished third in the World Championships in Valkenburg behind Oscar Camenzind and Peter Van Petegem. He ended the season as world number one on the UCI Road World Rankings and won his second consecutive UCI World Cup. During his years with MG and Asics, Bartoli was helped by his friend and team mate Paolo Bettini, who became Bartoli's prime lieutenant in the races.

=== 1999–2001: Mapei ===
In 1999, Bartoli and Bettini joined Mapei, the most successful classics team of the 1990s. He won Tirreno–Adriatico, the Brabantse Pijl and the Flèche Wallonne in the spring of 1999, but failed to win a monument race. In the 1999 Liège–Bastogne–Liège, Bartoli, seeking his third consecutive win, was distanced by rising star Frank Vandenbroucke and finished fourth behind his helper Bettini. In May 1999, Bartoli broke his kneecap in a crash in the Tour of Germany, which ended his season.

He returned to racing in 2000, but his Mapei teammate Paolo Bettini demanded a leading role, eventually leading to a feud between the two friends. In the summer of 2000, he won the Italian National Championship in Trieste and the Grand Prix de Plouay, before entering the Olympic road race in Sydney. Helped by his Italian teammates Bettini and Danilo Di Luca, he won the sprint for fourth place, finishing just outside the medals. He repeated his fourth place at the World championships.

In 2001, Bartoli won Omloop Het Volk early in the season, but failed to win another major spring classic. He left Mapei—exceptionally mid-season—to re-join Ferretti at the new Fassa Bortolo team. In October 2001, Bartoli and Bettini's rivalry culminated during the world championship road race, during which Bartoli refused to work for Bettini. Bettini finished second in the sprint behind Spaniard Óscar Freire; Bartoli was 23rd.

=== 2002–2004: Final years ===
With Fassa Bortolo, he re-lived some of his former successes by winning the 2002 Amstel Gold Race and the 2002 and 2003 Giro di Lombardia.

In 2004, he moved to Team CSC but failed to claim a victory. In the 2004 Tour de France, he abandoned during the 18th stage after being called back by manager Bjarne Riis from a break to protect his captain Ivan Basso. Bartoli ended his professional career at the end of the 2004 season, suffering minor injuries. He stated: "I just wasn't motivated to continue... I can't be a top-level rider any more and that was a major influence on my decision, rather than my recent physical problems."

== Retirement ==
In 2005 Bartoli gave his name to the Granfondo Michele Bartoli in the province of Lucca, with the start and finish in his hometown Montecarlo, Tuscany. Bartoli is, with former cyclists Francesco Casagrande and Maximilian Sciandri, instructor of the Campagnolo Passion 2 Ride.

== Doping allegations ==
In May 2007, Italian newspaper La Gazzetta dello Sport reported that Bartoli was linked with the Operación Puerto doping investigation into the practices of Eufemiano Fuentes. According to the report, it was alleged that Bartoli was the rider behind the nickname "Sansone". The report continued that Bartoli received two blood transfusions from Fuentes in 2003.

== Major results ==
1993
1st Overall Settimana Internazionale di Coppi e Bartali

1st Stages 1 & 6

6th Coppa Bernocchi
7th La Flèche Wallonne
7th GP Industria & Artigianato di Larciano
9th Gent–Wevelgem
9th Coppa Sabatini
9th Trofeo Matteotti
9th Giro del Friuli
10th Overall Hofbrau Cup
1994
1st Brabantse Pijl
1st Grand Prix Pino Cerami
1st Criterium d'Abruzzo
1st Stage 14 Giro d'Italia
2nd Giro del Veneto
3rd Overall Vuelta a los Valles Mineros
5th Road race, National Road Championships
6th Giro di Toscana
7th Overall Giro del Trentino
9th GP Industria & Artigianato di Larciano
10th Paris–Brussels
10th Giro della Romagna
1995
1st Overall Three Days of De Panne

1st Stages 1 & 2

3rd Liège–Bastogne–Liège
3rd Giro di Lombardia
5th Overall Volta a la Comunitat Valenciana
5th Milan–San Remo
5th Grand Prix Pino Cerami
6th Firenze–Pistoia
7th Tour of Flanders
8th Gran Piemonte
9th Overall Vuelta a España
9th Paris–Tours
10th Amstel Gold Race
1996
1st Tour of Flanders
1st Giro dell'Emilia
1st Grand Prix de Fourmies
1st Giro del Veneto
1st GP Industria & Artigianato di Larciano
1st Giro della Provincia di Reggio Calabria
1st Stage 6 Tirreno–Adriatico
1st Stage 1 Tour de Suisse
2nd Züri-Metzgete
2nd Giro della Romagna
3rd Road race, UCI Road World Championships
3rd Paris–Brussels
5th Grand Prix La Marseillaise
5th Wincanton Classic
6th Paris–Tours
6th Milano–Torino
6th Gran Premio Città di Camaiore
7th Overall Étoile de Bessèges
8th Road race, Olympic Games
8th Coppa Sabatini
10th Coppa Bernocchi
1997
1st Overall UCI Road World Cup
1st Liège–Bastogne–Liège
1st Rund um den Henninger Turm
1st Trofeo Laigueglia
1st Trofeo Melinda
2nd Overall Tour Méditerranéen

1st Stage 5

2nd Giro di Toscana
3rd Grand Prix de Fourmies
4th Giro di Lombardia
4th La Flèche Wallonne
4th Paris–Brussels
4th Gran Premio Bruno Beghelli
5th Milan–San Remo
6th Amstel Gold Race
6th Züri-Metzgete
7th Tour of Flanders
8th Overall Tirreno–Adriatico

1st Stage 3

9th Coppa Bernocchi
10th Road race, UCI Road World Championships
1998
1st Overall UCI Road World Cup
1st Overall Three Days of De Panne
1st Liège–Bastogne–Liège
1st Züri-Metzgete
1st Giro della Provincia di Reggio Calabria
1st Giro della Romagna
1st Grand Prix of Aargau Canton
1st Stage 13 Giro d'Italia
2nd E3 Prijs Vlaanderen
2nd Coppa Sabatini
2nd HEW Cyclassics
3rd Road race, UCI Road World Championships
3rd Amstel Gold Race
3rd Giro dell'Emilia
3rd Paris–Brussels
4th Giro di Lombardia
5th Overall Tour Méditerranéen

1st Stages 2 & 6

5th La Flèche Wallonne
5th Chrono des Nations
6th Tour of Flanders
8th Milan–San Remo
8th Giro del Veneto
1999
1st Overall Tirreno–Adriatico
1st La Flèche Wallonne
1st Brabantse Pijl
1st Stage 3 Vuelta a Andalucía
4th Tour of Flanders
4th Liège–Bastogne–Liège
4th E3 Prijs Vlaanderen
8th Overall Volta a la Comunitat Valenciana

1st Stage 4

2000
1st Road race, National Road Championships
1st GP Ouest-France
1st Stage 2 Vuelta a Andalucía
2nd Trofeo Melinda
2nd Gran Premio Città di Camaiore
3rd Coppa Placci
4th Road race, UCI Road World Championships
4th Road race, Olympic Games
5th Giro di Lombardia
5th Giro di Romagna
8th Giro del Veneto
9th Overall Giro della Provincia di Lucca
2001
1st Omloop Het Volk
1st Gran Premio Città di Camaiore
2nd Road race, National Road Championships
5th Giro di Lombardia
5th Classic Haribo
7th Amstel Gold Race
10th Paris–Nice
2002
1st Overall Tour Méditerranéen

1st Stages 1 (TTT) & 4

1st Giro di Lombardia
1st Amstel Gold Race
1st Giro dell'Emilia
1st Milano–Torino
1st Stage 2 Giro della Provincia di Lucca
3rd La Flèche Wallonne
5th Trofeo Laigueglia
6th Züri-Metzgete
6th Coppa Sabatini
8th Grand Prix de Fourmies
2003
1st Giro di Lombardia
1st Giro del Lazio
2nd Overall Tour de Wallonie

1st Stage 3

2nd Giro del Veneto
4th Trofeo Matteotti
7th Giro dell'Emilia
8th Coppa Placci
2004
7th Overall Tour of Britain

=== Classics results timeline ===
Monument	1993	1994	1995	1996	1997	1998	1999	2000	2001	2002	2003	2004
Milan–San Remo	25	—	5	12	5	8	64	39	11	45	164	120
Tour of Flanders	—	41	7	1	7	6	4	96	15	55	16	57
Paris–Roubaix	—	—	—	—	—	—	—	—	—	—	—	21
Liège–Bastogne–Liège	—	—	3	44	1	1	4	—	28	59	22	27
Giro di Lombardia	47	—	3	37	4	4	—	5	5	1	1	DNF
Classic	1993	1994	1995	1996	1997	1998	1999	2000	2001	2002	2003	2004
Omloop Het Nieuwsblad	—	—	—	—	—	—	—	—	1	—	—	—
Amstel Gold Race	—	34	10	28	6	3	15	—	7	1	16	15
La Flèche Wallonne	7	—	—	—	4	5	1	—	11	3	40	73
Züri-Metzgete	—	63	—	2	6	1	—	11	53	6	34	24
Giro dell'Emilia	—	—	—	1	13	3	—	—	13	1	7	—

=== Major championships timeline ===
Event	1993	1994	1995	1996	1997	1998	1999	2000	2001	2002	2003	2004
Olympic Games	Not Held			8	Not Held			4	Not Held			—
World Championships	—	—	—	3	10	3	—	4	23	—	—	—
National Championships	—	—	—	—	—	—	—	1	2	—	—	—
