= 1997 UCI Road World Championships – Men's road race =

Men's Individual Road Race
1997 UCI Road World Championships
- Rainbow jersey

Race details
- Dates: October 12, 1997
- Stages: 1
- Distance: 265.5 km (165.0 mi)
- Winning time: 6h 16' 48"

Medalists
	Gold	Laurent Brochard (FRA)	(France)
	Silver	Bo Hamburger (DEN)	(Denmark)
	Bronze	Léon van Bon (NED)	(Netherlands)

The men's road race at the 1997 UCI Road World Championships took place on October 12, 1997, in San Sebastián, Basque Country, Spain. The championship was won by the French Laurent Brochard, completing a French double in the Men's Elite Races after Laurent Jalabert won the Individual Time Trial a few days before. The men's road race featured 19 laps of 13.5 km, amounting to 265.5 kilometres of racing. There were a total of 161 starters, with 87 cyclists finishing the race.

== Final classification ==
Rank	Rider	Time
1st place, gold medalist(s)	Laurent Brochard (FRA)	06:16:48
2nd place, silver medalist(s)	Bo Hamburger (DEN)	s.t.
3rd place, bronze medalist(s)	Léon van Bon (NED)	s.t.
4	Udo Bölts (GER)	s.t.
5	Melcior Mauri (ESP)	s.t.
6	Laurent Dufaux (CH)	s.t.
7	Lauri Aus (EST)	+0'09"
8	Johan Museeuw (BEL)	+0'16"
9	Glenn Magnusson (SWE)	s.t.
10	Michele Bartoli (ITA)	s.t.
11	Laurent Jalabert (FRA)	s.t.
12	Mauro Gianetti (SUI)	s.t.
13	Francesco Casagrande (ITA)	s.t.
14	Davide Rebellin (ITA)	s.t.
15	Aart Vierhouten (NED)	+0'49"
16	Jens Zemke (GER)	+0'50"
17	Henk Vogels (AUS)	+0'57"
18	Andrei Tchmil (UKR)	s.t.
19	Cédric Vasseur (FRA)	s.t.
20	Andrea Tafi (ITA)	+0'58"
21	Oscar Camenzind (SUI)	s.t.
22	Lars Michaelsen (DEN)	s.t.
23	Jo Planckaert (BEL)	s.t.
24	Nicolas Jalabert (FRA)	s.t.
25	Piotr Ugrumov (RUS)	s.t.
25	Kai Hundertmarck (GER)	s.t.
25	Wilfried Peeters (BEL)	s.t.
25	Chris Horner (USA)	s.t.
25	Zbigniew Piątek (POL)	s.t.
30	Ángel Edo (ESP)	s.t.
31	Chann McRae (USA)	s.t.
32	Bart Voskamp (NED)	s.t.
33	Dariusz Baranowski (POL)	s.t.
34	Gianluca Bortolami (ITA)	s.t.
35	Christian Henn (GER)	s.t.
36	Bruno Thibout (FRA)	s.t.
37	Peter Van Petegem (BEL)	s.t.
38	Mario Aerts (BEL)	s.t.
39	Tyler Hamilton (USA)	s.t.
40	Frédéric Guesdon (FRA)	s.t.
41	Daniel Clavero (ESP)	s.t.
42	Servais Knaven (NED)	s.t.
43	Max van Heeswijk (NED)	s.t.
44	Laurent Roux (FRA)	s.t.
45	Félix García (ESP)	s.t.
46	Gianni Faresin (ITA)	s.t.
47	Armin Meier (SUI)	s.t.
48	Claus Møller (DEN)	s.t.
49	Erik Breukink (NED)	s.t.
50	Michael Boogerd (NED)	s.t.
51	Koos Moerenhout (NED)	s.t.
52	Roberto Heras (ESP)	s.t.
53	Axel Merckx (BEL)	s.t.
54	Bert Dietz (GER)	s.t.
55	Serhiy Honchar (UKR)	s.t.
56	Gianni Bugno (ITA)	s.t.
57	Maurizio Fondriest (ITA)	s.t.
58	Marino Alonso (ESP)	s.t.
59	Bjarne Riis (DEN)	s.t.
60	Richard Virenque (FRA)	+1'04"
61	Michel Lafis (SWE)	+7'35"
62	Zenon Jaskuła (POL)	s.t.
63	Andrzej Sypytkowski (POL)	s.t.
64	Dainis Ozols (LAT)	s.t.
65	Sergei Ivanov (RUS)	s.t.
66	Michael Andersson (SWE)	s.t.
67	Nico Mattan (BEL)	s.t.
68	Marty Jemison (USA)	s.t.
69	Tomáš Konečný (CZE)	s.t.
70	Frank McCormack (USA)	+7'43"
71	José Castelblanco (COL)	+8'32"
72	Luca Scinto (ITA)	s.t.
73	Mario Kummer (GER)	s.t.
74	Piotr Chmielewski (POL)	s.t.
75	Alexei Sivakov (RUS)	s.t.
76	Sergei Uslamine (RUS)	s.t.
77	Marcos-Antonio Serrano (ESP)	s.t.
78	Sascha Henrix (GER)	s.t.
79	Søren Petersen (DEN)	s.t.
80	José García Acosta (ESP)	s.t.
81	Kurt Van De Wouwer (BEL)	s.t.
82	Brian Holm (DEN)	s.t.
83	Frank Høj (DEN)	s.t.
84	Jörg Jaksche (GER)	s.t.
85	Cezary Zamana (POL)	+11'55"
86	Piotr Wadecki (POL)	s.t.
87	Federico Muñoz (COL)	s.t.
