= Oscar Camenzind =

Swiss cyclist (born 1971)

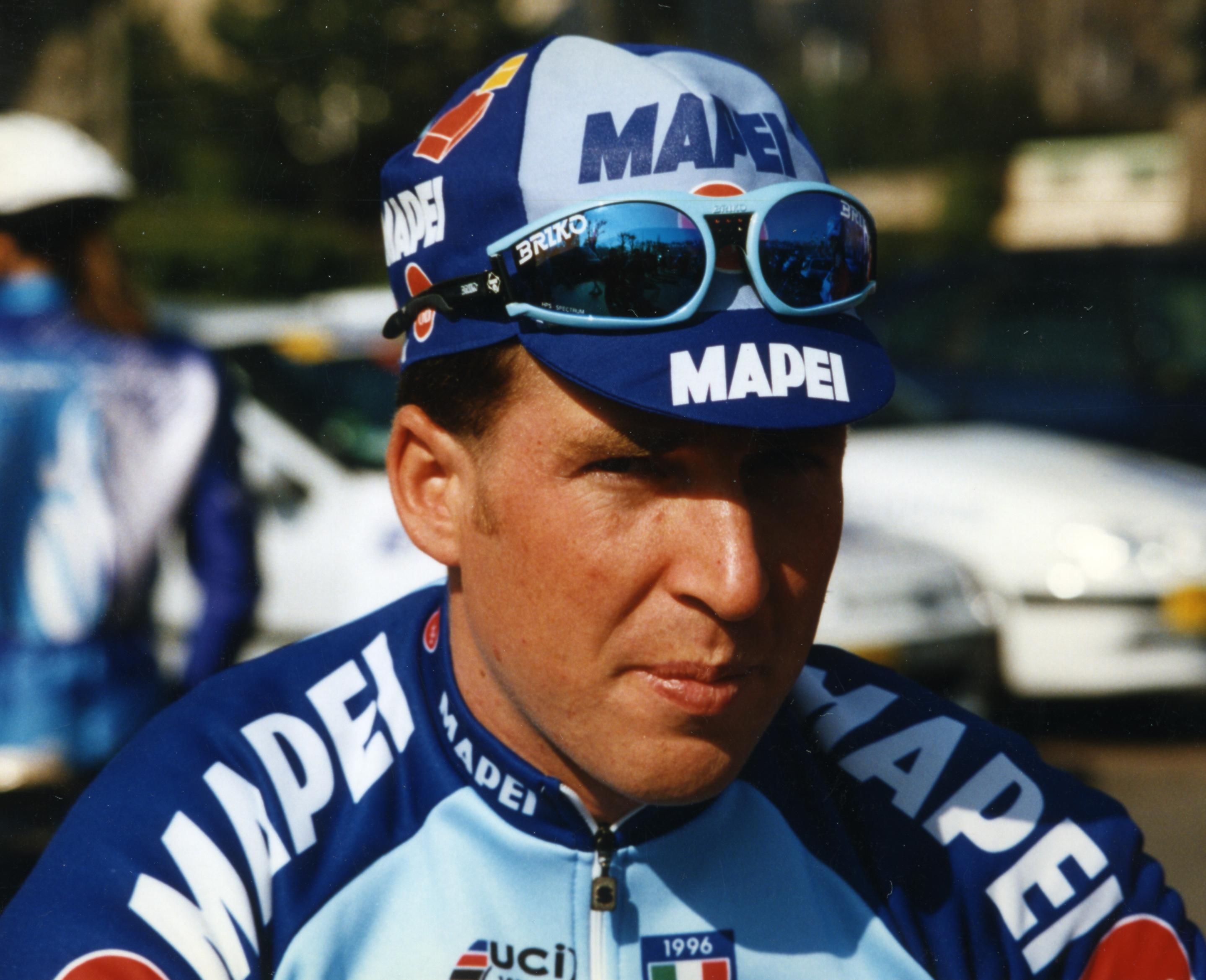
- Camenzind at the 1997 Paris–Nice

Personal information
- Full name: Oscar Camenzind
- Born: 12 September 1971 (age 55) Schwyz, Switzerland
- Height: 1.74 m (5 ft 8 1/2 in)
- Weight: 65 kg (143 lb; 10 st 3 lb)

Cycling career
- Sport: Cycling
- Current team: Retired
- Discipline: Road
- Role: Puncheur

Professional teams
- 1996: Panaria–Vinavil
- 1997–1998: Mapei–GB
- 1999–2001: Lampre–Daikin
- 2002–2004: Phonak

Major wins
- Stage Races Tour de Suisse (2000) One-day Races and Classics World Road Race Championships (1998) National Road Race Championships (1997) Giro di Lombardia (1998) Liège–Bastogne–Liège (2001)
Medal record
Men's Road bicycle racing
Representing Switzerland
UCI Road World Championships
Gold medal – first place	1998 Valkenburg	Elite Men's Road Race

Oscar Camenzind (born 12 September 1971) is a former professional road racing cyclist from Switzerland. He became national road champion in 1997. In 1998 he won the World Road Championship and the Giro di Lombardia, in 2000 the Tour de Suisse and Liège–Bastogne–Liège in 2001. His career came to an abrupt end when he retired from pro cycling after a positive doping test in July 2004 for erythropoietin, leading into the Athens Olympics. After confessing to the use, in 2005 he was sued in Swiss court in order to name his supplier, which he refused to do fearing retribution.

== Major results ==
1989
2nd Road race, National Junior Road Championships
1994
2nd Gran Premio Palio del Recioto
1996
2nd Overall Grand Prix Guillaume Tell

1st Stages 2, 3b & 4

2nd À travers Lausanne
3rd Road race, National Road Championships
7th Overall Giro di Puglia
1997
1st Road race, National Road Championships
1st Overall Grand Prix Guillaume Tell

1st Stage 4b

1st Breitling Grand Prix (with Johan Museeuw)
2nd Overall Tour de Suisse

1st Prologue & Stage 8

3rd Overall Tour of Austria

1st Prologue & Stage 5

4th Overall À travers Lausanne
4th Rund um Köln
1998
1st Road race, UCI Road World Championships
1st Giro di Lombardia
2nd Milano–Torino
2nd Tour de Berne
3rd GP du canton d'Argovie
4th Overall Giro d'Italia
6th Trofeo Melinda
1999
1st Stage 3 Giro del Trentino
3rd Tour de Berne
4th Giro di Lombardia
4th La Flèche Wallonne
4th Gran Premio di Chiasso
4th Breitling Grand Prix (with Marco Serpellini)
5th Overall Tour de Suisse

1st Stage 7

5th Overall Tour de Romandie
6th Road race, UCI Road World Championships
8th Liège–Bastogne–Liège
9th Overall Tirreno–Adriatico
2000
1st Overall Tour de Suisse
2nd À travers Lausanne
2nd EnBW Grand Prix (with Robbie Hunter)
7th Züri-Metzgete
2001
1st Liège–Bastogne–Liège
1st Stage 10 Tour de Suisse
3rd Luk-Cup Bühl
7th Overall Tirreno–Adriatico
9th EnBW Grand Prix (with Gilberto Simoni)
10th Overall Tour de Romandie
2002
1st Overall Sachsen Tour International

1st Stage 2

2nd Milano–Torino
3rd Overall Vuelta a Murcia
3rd Giro di Lombardia
8th Züri-Metzgete
9th Overall Tour Méditerranéen
2003
1st Stage 3 Sachsen Tour International
3rd Coppa Placci
3rd Gran Premio Industria e Commercio di Prato
4th Road race, National Road Championships
4th Tre Valli Varesine
4th Giro del Veneto
7th Züri-Metzgete
7th Trofeo Matteotti
9th Giro dell'Emilia
2004
3rd Road race, National Road Championships
3rd Trofeo Matteotti
9th Overall Tour de Suisse

=== Grand Tour general classification results timeline ===
Grand Tour	1996	1997	1998	1999	2000	2001	2002	2003	2004
Giro d'Italia	—	—	4	11	—	27	—	—	—
Tour de France	36	12	—	—	—	—	—	—	—
Vuelta a España	—	—	16	48	22	DNF	DNF	—	—

=== Monuments results timeline ===
Monument	1996	1997	1998	1999	2000	2001	2002	2003	2004
Milan–San Remo	154	—	—	29	28	40	—	36	26
Tour of Flanders	94	—	—	—	11	—	—	DNF	83
Paris–Roubaix	Did not contest during his career								
Liège–Bastogne–Liège	—	—	—	8	13	1	—	—	54
Giro di Lombardia	15	DNF	1	4	15	—	3	DNF	—

Legend
—	Did not compete
DNF	Did not finish

== See also ==
- List of doping cases in cycling
- List of sportspeople sanctioned for doping offences

Awards
Preceded by (Switzerland) Michael von Grünigen	Swiss Sportsman of the Year; 1998	Succeeded by (Switzerland) Marcel Schelbert
