= Walter Bénéteau =

French cyclist (1972–2022)

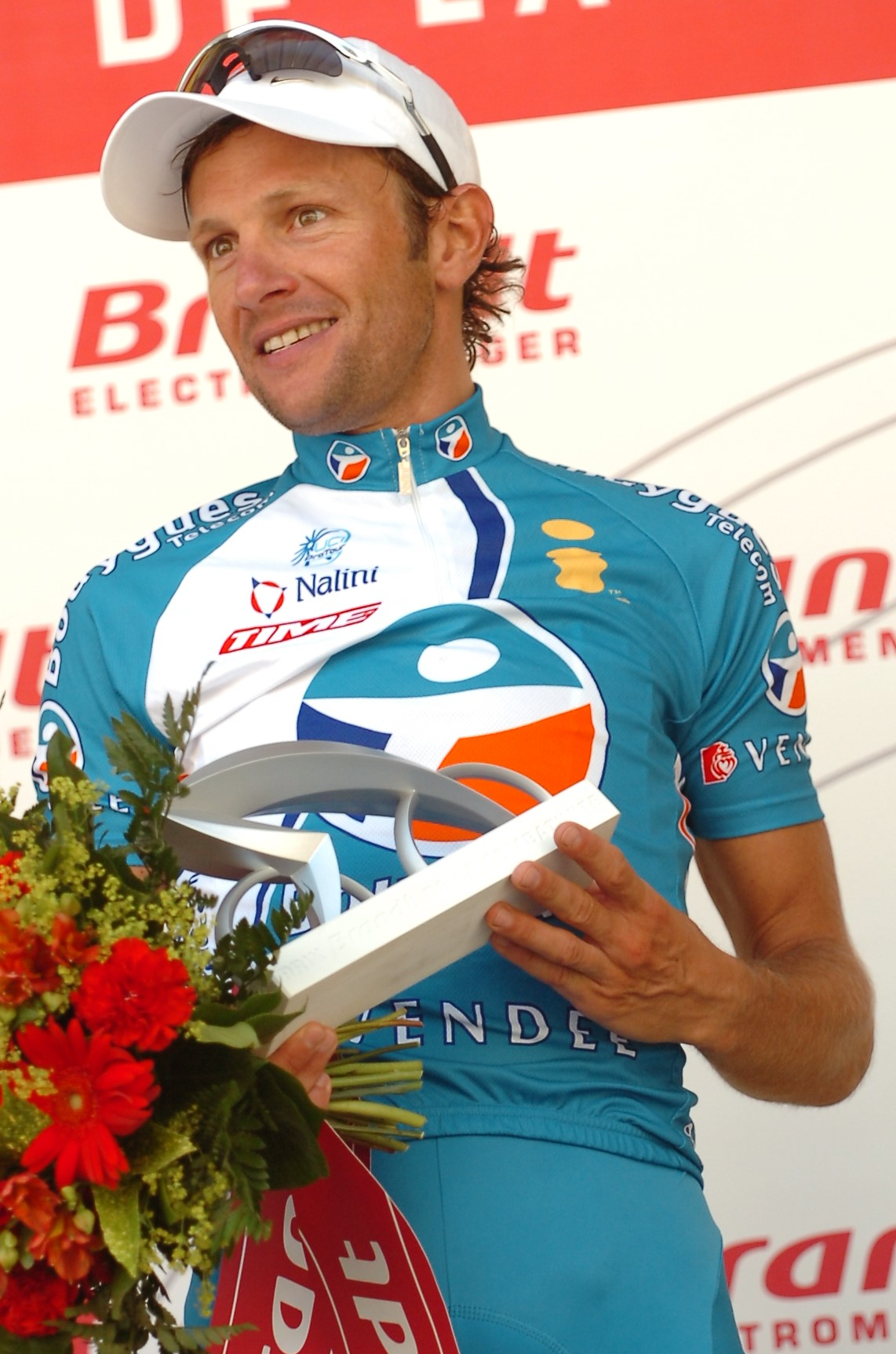
- Walter Bénéteau in 2006

Personal information
- Born: 28 July 1972 Les Essarts, Vendée, France
- Died: 10 December 2022 (aged 50) Bali, Indonesia
- Height: 1.75 m (5 ft 9 in)
- Weight: 67 kg (148 lb)

Cycling career
- Sport: Cycling
- Current team
- Discipline: Road
- Role: Rider
- Rider type: Sprinter

Amateur team
- 1991–1999: Vendée U

Professional teams
- 1995: Castorama (stagiaire)
- 2000–2006: Bonjour

Walter Bénéteau (28 July 1972 – 10 December 2022) was a French professional cyclist. He raced in every Tour de France from 2000 until 2006.

== Career ==
Stage 1 of the 2006 Tour de France started with a seven-man break-away with Bénéteau being the last man caught with 7 km to go after spending 177 km out in front. During Stage 6 Bénéteau was hit in the face by Spaniard David de la Fuente causing his glasses and helmet to go flying. Then in Stage 9 Bénéteau was part of an initial 3-man break-away, caught with only 10 km to the finish line. During this stage he won all three intermediate sprint points, moving him to 23rd in the Points classification. Bénéteau's final Grand Tour was the 2006 Vuelta a España; he finished first in the main peloton bunch sprint in stage 11, 15 minutes down on winner Egoi Martínez. He finished 83rd overall in his final Grand Tour. Bénéteau announced he would retire after his contract ended with Bouygues Télécom.

== Death ==
Bénéteau died on 10 December 2022 in a hotel room in Bali, Indonesia. The circumstances of his death have not yet been released by local authorities.

== Major results ==
1996
3rd Tro-Bro Léon
1997
1st Tour du Finistère
1999
7th Tour du Doubs
2000
1st Châteauroux Classic
1st Boucles de l'Aulne
3rd GP Ouest-France
3rd Trophée des Grimpeurs
10th Tour de Berne
2001
2nd Road race, National Road Championships
2002
2nd Tour de Vendée
2nd Tro-Bro Léon
8th Trophée des Grimpeurs
2003
1st Boucles de l'Aulne
3rd La Poly Normande
8th Overall Tour du Limousin
8th Grand Prix d'Ouverture La Marseillaise
8th Grand Prix de Wallonie
9th Tour de Vendée
2004
9th Road race, National Road Championships
2005
3rd Bordeaux-Caudéran
2006
2nd Boucles de l'Aulne
4th Trophée des Grimpeurs

=== Grand Tour general classification results timeline ===
Grand Tour	2000	2001	2002	2003	2004	2005	2006
Giro d'Italia	—	—	—	—	—	105	—
Tour de France	71	42	117	59	102	68	109
Vuelta a España	—	—	—	—	—	—	83

Legend
—	Did not compete
