= 2000 GP Ouest-France =

Race details
- Dates: 30 July 2000
- Stages: 1
- Distance: 209 km (129.9 mi)
- Winning time: 4h 59' 00"

Results
	Winner	Michele Bartoli (ITA)	(Mapei–Quick-Step)
	Second	Nico Mattan (BEL)	(Cofidis)
	Third	Walter Bénéteau (FRA)	(Bonjour)

The 2000 GP Ouest-France was the 64th edition of the GP Ouest-France cycle race and was held on 30 July 2000. The race started and finished in Plouay. The race was won by Michele Bartoli of the Mapei team.

== General classification ==
Final general classification

Rank	Rider	Team	Time
1	Michele Bartoli (ITA)	Mapei–Quick-Step	4h 59' 00"
2	Nico Mattan (BEL)	Cofidis	+ 10"
3	Walter Bénéteau (FRA)	Bonjour	+ 11"
4	Tristan Hoffman (NED)	Memory Card–Jack & Jones	+ 11"
5	Mario Aerts (BEL)	Lotto–Adecco	+ 14"
6	Jean-Cyril Robin (FRA)	Bonjour	+ 59"
7	Maarten den Bakker (NED)	Rabobank	+ 59"
8	Bo Hamburger (DEN)	Memory Card–Jack & Jones	+ 59"
9	Thierry Marichal (FRA)	Lotto–Adecco	+ 1' 03"
10	Serge Baguet (BEL)	Lotto–Adecco	+ 1' 03"
