= 2003 Tour de la Région Wallonne =

Race details
- Dates: 28 July–1 August 2003
- Stages: 5
- Winning time: 21h 23' 36"

Results
	Winner	Julian Dean (NZL)
	Second	Michele Bartoli (ITA)
	Third	Yaroslav Popovych (UKR)

The 2003 Tour de la Région Wallonne was the 30th edition of the Tour de Wallonie cycle race and was held on from July to 1 August 2003. The race started in Flobecq and finished in Chaudfontaine. The race was won by Julian Dean.

== General classification ==
Final general classification

Rank	Rider	Time
1	Julian Dean (NZL)	21h 23' 36"
2	Michele Bartoli (ITA)	s.t
3	Yaroslav Popovych (UKR)	+ 12"
4	Kim Kirchen (LUX)	+ 14"
5	Jurgen Van Goolen (BEL)	+ 18"
6	Peter Farazijn (BEL)	s.t.
7	Dave Bruylandts (BEL)	s.t.
8	Tom Boonen (BEL)	+ 19"
9	Michael Barry (CAN)	+ 20"
10	Matthew White (AUS)	+ 24"
