= Bo Hamburger =

Danish cyclist

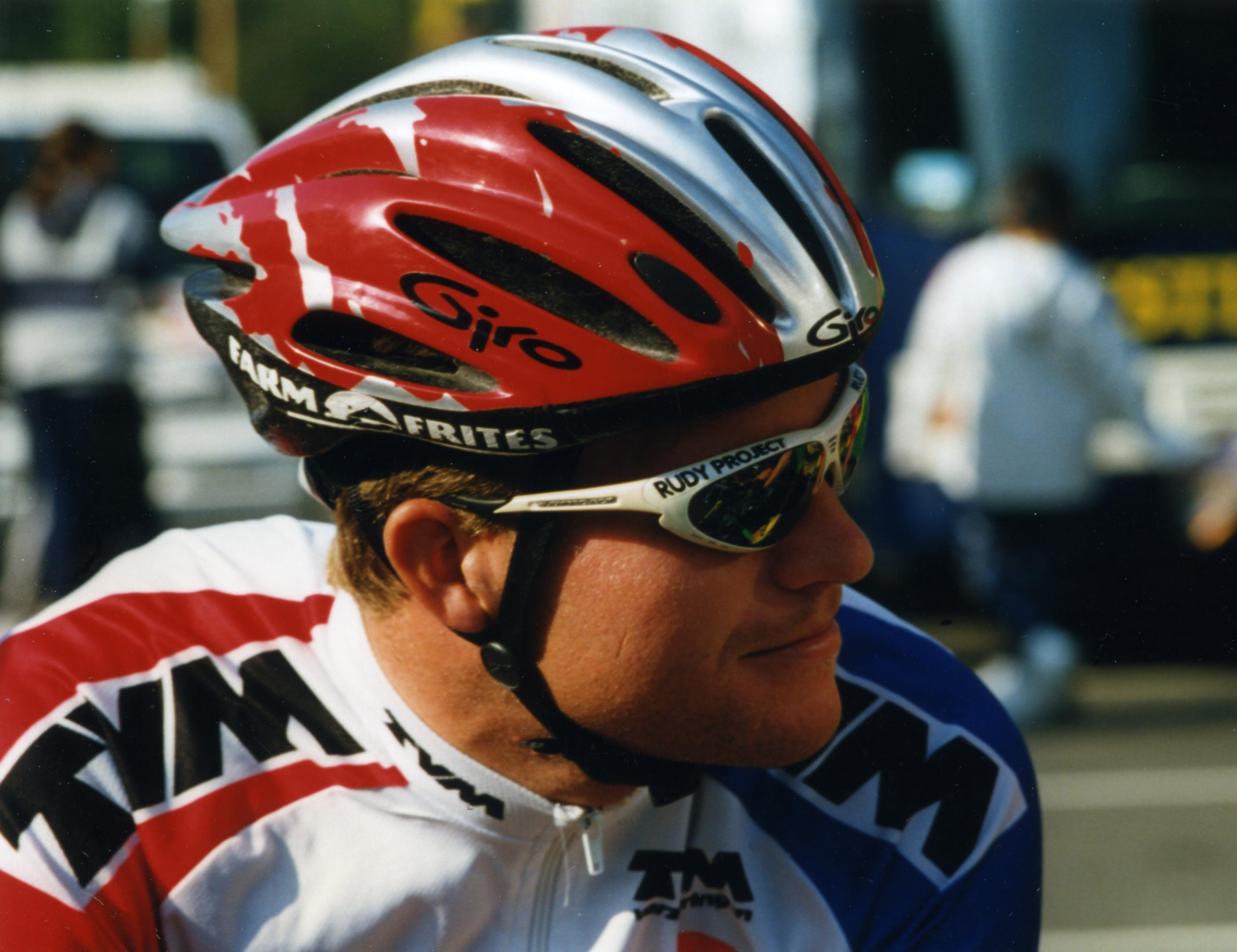
- Hamburger at the 1997 Paris–Tours

Personal information
- Full name: Bo Hamburger
- Born: 24 May 1970 (age 56) Frederiksberg, Denmark
- Height: 1.74 m (5 ft 8 1/2 in)
- Weight: 58 kg (128 lb; 9 st 2 lb)

Cycling career
- Sport: Cycling
- Current team: Retired
- Discipline: Road
- Role: Rider; Directeur sportif

Professional teams
- 1991–1997: TVM–Sanyo
- 1998: Casino–Ag2r
- 1999: Cantina Tollo–Alexia Alluminio
- 2000–2001: Memory Card–Jack & Jones
- 2002: Index–Alexia Alluminio
- 2003: Formaggi Pinzolo Fiavè
- 2004–2005: Acqua & Sapone
- 2006: Miche

Managerial team
- 2013–2014: Christina Watches–Onfone

Major wins
- Grand Tours Tour de France 1 individual stage (1994) One-day races and Classics National Road Race Championships (2000) La Flèche Wallonne (1998)
Medal record
Representing Denmark
Men's road bicycle racing
World Championships
Silver medal – second place	1997 San Sebastián	Road race

Bo Hamburger (born 24 May 1970 in Frederiksberg) is a Danish former professional road racing cyclist. He retired in 2006.

== Biography ==
After ending his career, Hamburger started a building company and a bike shop. He was the leading directeur sportif for Christina Watches–Onfone in 2013 and 2014.

== Doping ==
He was fired from Team CSC in 2001, after a positive EPO test. He was later cleared legally since the B test was below the limit, but still higher than normal. Since then, the Danish Cycle Union refused to let Hamburger represent Denmark. Hamburger fought the exclusion through legal means.

In his book Den største pris – en cykelrytters bekendelser (The Greatest Cost – Confession of a Cyclist) released in Denmark on 7 November 2007, he admitted to using EPO and human growth hormone from 1995 to 1997.

His name was also on the list of doping tests published by the French Senate on 24 July 2013 that were collected during the 1998 Tour de France and found positive for EPO when retested in 2004.

== Major results ==
1991
5th Overall Tour of Sweden
1992
2nd Overall Tour of Sweden
4th Coppa Sabatini
8th Giro di Lombardia
8th Gran Piemonte
10th Overall Vuelta a Andalucía
1993
2nd Overall Hofbrau Cup
3rd Overall Tour de l'Avenir
4th Coppa Placci
8th Grand Prix de Wallonie
8th Classique des Alpes
9th Brabantse Pijl
9th Druivenkoers-Overijse
1994
1st Stage 8 Tour de France
1st Omloop der Vlaamse Ardennen
3rd Wincanton Classic
3rd Grand Prix Herning
4th Overall Vuelta a Andalucía
5th Veenendaal–Veenendaal
8th Coppa Placci
9th Gran Piemonte
1995
2nd Overall Danmark Rundt
2nd Grand Prix Herning
5th Overall Volta a Catalunya
1996
2nd Road race, National Road Championships
2nd Grand Prix de Wallonie
6th Overall Volta a Catalunya
6th Overall Tour de Luxembourg
8th Overall Danmark Rundt
10th Classique des Alpes
1997
2nd Road race, UCI Road World Championships
4th Overall Grand Prix du Midi Libre
7th Overall Volta a Catalunya
1998
1st La Flèche Wallonne
1st Stage 2 Tour of the Basque Country
2nd Overall Volta a la Comunitat Valenciana

1st Stage 2

2nd Overall Tour Méditerranéen
2nd Road race, National Road Championships
3rd Overall Critérium International
4th Overall Danmark Rundt
4th GP de Fourmies
5th Amstel Gold Race
5th Gran Premio Bruno Beghelli
6th Classique des Alpes
9th Giro di Romagna
Tour de France

Held After Stage 4

1999
6th Overall Settimana Internazionale di Coppi e Bartali
7th Overall Tirreno–Adriatico
2000
1st Road race, National Road Championships
1st Stage 4 Paris–Nice
3rd Paris–Bourges
3rd GP de Fourmies
6th Overall Rheinland-Pfalz Rundfahrt

1st Stage 4

6th Tour du Haut Var
8th GP Ouest–France
9th Rund um den Flughafen Köln–Bonn
2001
6th Overall Giro della Liguria
2002
2nd GP Fred Mengoni
3rd Road race, National Road Championships
10th Coppa Ugo Agostoni
2003
2nd GP Industria & Commercio di Prato
2nd GP Fred Mengoni
3rd Road race, National Road Championships
6th Road race, UCI Road World Championships
7th Coppa Ugo Agostoni
8th Trofeo Città di Castelfidardo
9th Giro di Romagna
9th Trofeo Pantalica
10th Gran Premio Bruno Beghelli
2004
1st Stage 2 Giro della Liguria
2nd Giro delle Colline del Chianti
5th GP Industria & Commercio di Prato
6th Wachovia Invitational
2006
5th Trofeo Matteotti

=== Grand Tour general classification results timeline ===
Grand Tour	1992	1993	1994	1995	1996	1997	1998	1999	2000	2001	2002	2003	2004
Giro d'Italia	—	—	—	95	—	—	—	59	—	—	77	53	37
Tour de France	—	31	20	17	13	DNF	15	DNF	36	—	—	—	—
Vuelta a España	48	—	—	—	44	33	—	—	—	—	—	—	—

== See also ==
- List of doping cases in cycling
