= 2002 Giro di Lombardia =

Race details
- Dates: 19 October 2002
- Stages: 1
- Distance: 251 km (156 mi)
- Winning time: 6h 14' 49"

Results
	Winner	Michele Bartoli (ITA)	(Fassa Bortolo)
	Second	Davide Rebellin (ITA)	(Gerolsteiner)
	Third	Oscar Camenzind (SUI)	(Phonak)

The 2002 Giro di Lombardia was the 96th edition of the Giro di Lombardia cycle race and was held on 19 October 2002. The race started in Cantù and finished in Bergamo. The race was won by Michele Bartoli of the Fassa Bortolo team.

== General classification ==
Final general classification

Rank	Rider	Team	Time
1	Michele Bartoli (ITA)	Fassa Bortolo	6h 14' 49"
2	Davide Rebellin (ITA)	Gerolsteiner	+ 0"
3	Oscar Camenzind (SUI)	Phonak	+ 0"
4	Marco Serpellini (ITA)	Lampre–Daikin	+ 0"
5	Francesco Casagrande (ITA)	Fassa Bortolo	+ 0"
6	Michael Boogerd (NED)	Rabobank	+ 0"
7	Pablo Lastras (ESP)	iBanesto.com	+ 0"
8	Joseba Beloki (ESP)	ONCE–Eroski	+ 0"
9	Dario Frigo (ITA)	Tacconi Sport	+ 0"
10	Francisco Mancebo (ESP)	iBanesto.com	+ 0"
