= Mario Aerts =

Belgian cyclist (born 1974)

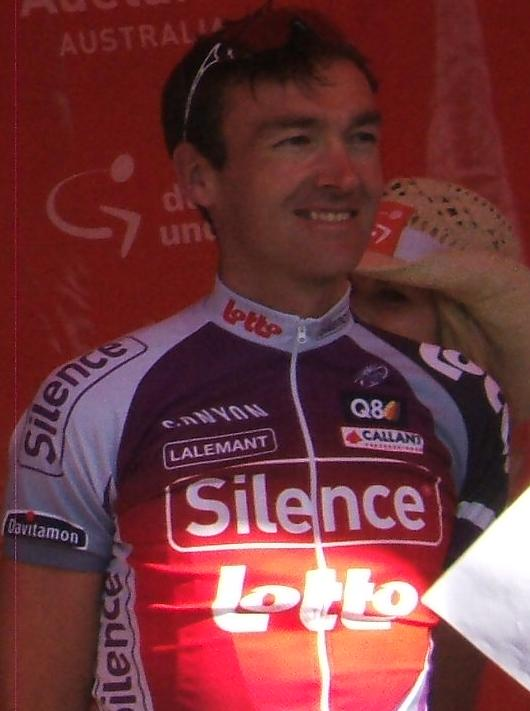

Personal information
- Full name: Mario Aerts
- Born: 31 December 1974 (age 51) Herentals, Belgium
- Height: 1.82 m (6 ft 0 in)
- Weight: 68 kg (150 lb)

Cycling career
- Sport: Cycling
- Current team: Retired
- Discipline: Road
- Role: Rider

Professional teams
- 1996–1997: Vlaanderen 2002
- 1998–2002: Lotto–Mobistar
- 2003–2004: Team Telekom
- 2005–2011: Davitamon–Lotto

Managerial team
- 2012–: Lotto–Belisol

Major wins
- Stage races Circuit Franco Belge (1997) One-day races and Classics La Flèche Wallonne (2002)

Mario Aerts (born 31 December 1974 in Herentals, Belgium) is a former professional road bicycle racer, who competed between 1996 and 2011. He competed for three teams: Vlaanderen 2002, Team Telekom and the Lotto team through various sponsorships, competing with that particular team for twelve seasons during his career. During this time, he raced in the Tours de France, the Giro d'Italia, and the Vuelta a España. In the 2007 cycling season, he finished in these three major stage races in cycling. He was only the 25th racer in the history of cycling to achieve this.

Aerts won the Grand Prix d'Isbergues in 1996, Circuit Franco Belge in 2001, the Giro della Provincia di Lucca in 2001, and most notably La Flèche Wallonne in 2002; he did not win a professional race after that. In June 2011, he announced his retirement as a professional cyclist at the end of the year, citing heart problems as the major cause. After retiring he would become an assistant for the team he rode for under its present name: Lotto-Soudal.

== Major results ==
1994
1st Stage 6 Tour de Wallonie
1995
2nd Overall Tour de Wallonie
1996
1st Grand Prix d'Isbergues
9th Tour du Haut Var
1997
1st Overall Circuit Franco-Belge

1st Mountains classification

5th Overall Circuito Montañés
9th Overall Regio-Tour
10th Overall Tour de Wallonie
1998
2nd Le Samyn
6th Veenendaal–Veenendaal
7th Japan Cup
9th Gran Premio de Llodio
1999
3rd Overall Route du Sud
3rd La Flèche Wallonne
4th Overall Tour of the Basque Country
4th Grand Prix Breitling
2000
5th La Flèche Wallonne
5th GP Ouest-France
2001
1st Overall Giro della Provincia di Lucca
3rd Overall Rheinland-Pfalz Rundfahrt
4th GP Miguel Induráin
4th Tour du Haut Var
5th GP Ouest-France
6th Overall Paris–Nice
9th Züri-Metzgete
2002
1st La Flèche Wallonne
3rd GP Miguel Induráin
5th Overall Tour of the Basque Country
8th Overall Critérium International
9th Overall Paris–Nice
2004
6th Veenendaal–Veenendaal
2006
3rd Overall Settimana Internazionale di Coppi e Bartali
2007
9th Brabantse Pijl
2008
8th Road race, Olympic Games
