= 2001 Omloop Het Volk =

Race details
- Dates: 3 March 2001
- Stages: 1
- Distance: 200 km (120 mi)
- Winning time: 4h 52' 00"

Results
	Winner	Michele Bartoli (ITA)
	Second	Hendrik Van Dijck (BEL)
	Third	Matthé Pronk (NED)

The 2001 Omloop Het Volk was the 55th edition of the Omloop Het Volk cycle race and was held on 3 March 2001. The race started in Ghent and finished in Lokeren. The race was won by Michele Bartoli.

== General classification ==
Final general classification
Rank	Rider	Time
1	Michele Bartoli (ITA)	4h 52' 00"
2	Hendrik Van Dijck (BEL)	+ 0"
3	Matthé Pronk (NED)	+ 0"
4	Arvis Piziks (LAT)	+ 0"
5	Fabien De Waele (BEL)	+ 0"
6	Daniele Nardello (ITA)	+ 0"
7	Maarten den Bakker (NED)	+ 0"
8	Paul Van Hyfte (BEL)	+ 18"
9	Didier Rous (FRA)	+ 2' 15"
10	Pieter Vries (NED)	+ 2' 58"
