= 1999 La Flèche Wallonne =

Race details
- Dates: 14 April 1999
- Stages: 1
- Distance: 200 km (124.3 mi)
- Winning time: 4h 52' 46"

Results
	Winner	Michele Bartoli (ITA)	(Mapei–Quick-Step)
	Second	Maarten den Bakker (NED)	(Rabobank)
	Third	Mario Aerts (BEL)	(Lotto–Mobistar)

The 1999 La Flèche Wallonne was the 63rd edition of La Flèche Wallonne cycle race and was held on 14 April 1999. The race started in Charleroi and finished in Huy. The race was won by Michele Bartoli of the Mapei team.

== General classification ==
Final general classification

Rank	Rider	Team	Time
1	Michele Bartoli (ITA)	Mapei–Quick-Step	4h 52' 46"
2	Maarten den Bakker (NED)	Rabobank	+ 14"
3	Mario Aerts (BEL)	Lotto–Mobistar	+ 3' 06"
4	Oscar Camenzind (SUI)	Lampre–Daikin	+ 3' 13"
5	Michael Boogerd (NED)	Rabobank	+ 3' 34"
6	Udo Bölts (GER)	Team Telekom	+ 3' 40"
7	Marco Velo (ITA)	Mercatone Uno–Bianchi	+ 3' 42"
8	Koos Moerenhout (NED)	Rabobank	+ 3' 45"
9	Jens Voigt (GER)	Crédit Agricole	+ 3' 48"
10	Paolo Savoldelli (ITA)	Saeco–Cannondale	+ 3' 53"
