= 1998 La Flèche Wallonne =

Race details
- Dates: 15 April 1998
- Stages: 1
- Distance: 201 km (124.9 mi)
- Winning time: 5h 06' 54"

Results
	Winner	Bo Hamburger (DEN)	(Casino–Ag2r)
	Second	Frank Vandenbroucke (BEL)	(Mapei–Bricobi)
	Third	Alberto Elli (ITA)	(Casino–Ag2r)

The 1998 La Flèche Wallonne was the 62nd edition of La Flèche Wallonne cycle race and was held on 15 April 1998. The race started in Charleroi and finished in Huy. The race was won by Bo Hamburger of the Casino team.

== General classification ==
Final general classification

Rank	Rider	Team	Time
1	Bo Hamburger (DEN)	Casino–Ag2r	5h 06' 54"
2	Frank Vandenbroucke (BEL)	Mapei–Bricobi	+ 6"
3	Alberto Elli (ITA)	Casino–Ag2r	+ 10"
4	Maarten den Bakker (NED)	Rabobank	+ 12"
5	Michele Bartoli (ITA)	Asics–CGA	+ 15"
6	Luc Leblanc (FRA)	Team Polti	+ 17"
7	Pascal Hervé (FRA)	Festina–Lotus	+ 18"
8	Roberto Petito (ITA)	Saeco–Cannondale	+ 19"
9	Laurent Dufaux (SUI)	Festina–Lotus	+ 22"
10	Rodolfo Massi (ITA)	Casino–Ag2r	+ 25"
