= 1998 Giro di Lombardia =

Race details
- Dates: 17 October 1998
- Stages: 1
- Distance: 253 km (157 mi)
- Winning time: 5h 59' 01"

Results
	Winner	Oscar Camenzind (SUI)	(Mapei–Bricobi)
	Second	Michael Boogerd (NED)	(Rabobank)
	Third	Felice Puttini (SUI)	(Ros Mary–Amica Chips)

The 1998 Giro di Lombardia was the 92nd edition of the Giro di Lombardia cycle race and was held on 17 October 1998. The race started in Varese and finished in Bergamo. The race was won by Oscar Camenzind of the Mapei team.

== General classification ==
Final general classification

Rank	Rider	Team	Time
1	Oscar Camenzind (SUI)	Mapei–Bricobi	5h 59' 01"
2	Michael Boogerd (NED)	Rabobank	+ 6"
3	Felice Puttini (SUI)	Ros Mary–Amica Chips	+ 1' 21"
4	Michele Bartoli (ITA)	Asics–CGA	+ 1' 21"
5	Pascal Richard (SUI)	Casino–Ag2r	+ 1' 21"
6	Gilberto Simoni (ITA)	Cantina Tollo–Alexia Alluminio	+ 1' 57"
7	Marco Serpellini (ITA)	Brescialat–Liquigas	+ 3' 50"
8	Markus Zberg (SUI)	Post Swiss Team	+ 3' 50"
9	Andrei Zintchenko (RUS)	Vitalicio Seguros	+ 3' 50"
10	Andrea Tafi (ITA)	Mapei–Bricobi	+ 3' 50"
