= 1996 Tour of Flanders =

1996 UCI Road World Cup, race 2
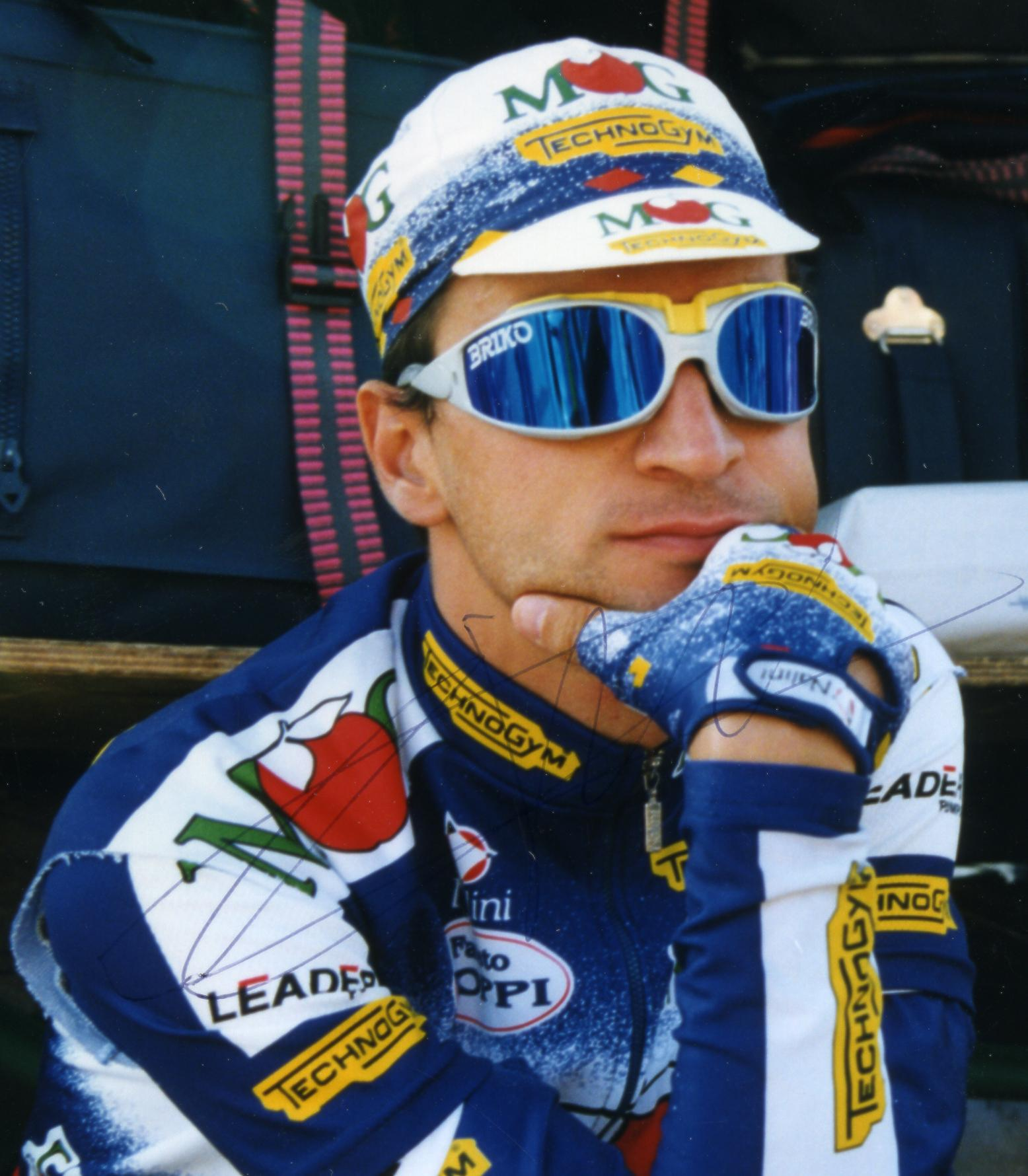
- Michele Bartoli sealed the seventh Italian victory in the Tour of Flanders

Race details
- Dates: 7 April 1996
- Stages: 1
- Distance: 269 km (167.1 mi)
- Winning time: 6h 27' 00"

Results
	Winner	Michele Bartoli (ITA)	(MG Maglificio–Technogym)
	Second	Fabio Baldato (ITA)	(MG Maglificio–Technogym)
	Third	Johan Museeuw (BEL)	(Mapei–GB)

The 80th running of the Tour of Flanders cycling race in Belgium was held on Sunday 7 April 1996. Italian Michele Bartoli won the monument classic ahead of Fabio Baldato and Johan Museeuw. The race started in Sint-Niklaas and finished in Meerbeke (Ninove).

== Race summary ==
A group of 11, containing all favourites, was at the foot of the Muur van Geraardsbergen, when defending champion and race favourite Johan Museeuw had a lingering rear wheel and was distanced on the climb. Michele Bartoli attacked on the steep upper slopes of the Muur and pushed on over the Bosberg towards the finish. The stylish Italian won with a minute lead over the chase group where team mate Fabio Baldato won the sprint ahead of a returning Museeuw.

== Climbs ==
There were sixteen categorized climbs:

- Tiegemberg
- Kluisberg
- Knokteberg
- Oude Kwaremont
- Paterberg
- Kortekeer
- Taaienberg
- Eikenberg
- Volkegemberg
- Varent
- Leberg
- Molenberg
- Berendries
- Valkenberg
- Muur-Kapelmuur
- Bosberg

== Results ==
	Cyclist	Team	Time
1	Michele Bartoli (ITA)	MG Maglificio–Technogym	6h 27' 00"
2	Fabio Baldato (ITA)	MG Maglificio–Technogym	+ 55"
3	Johan Museeuw (BEL)	Mapei–GB	s.t.
4	Viatcheslav Ekimov (RUS)	Rabobank	s.t.
5	Fabiano Fontanelli (ITA)	MG Maglificio–Technogym	s.t.
6	Andrei Tchmil (UKR)	Lotto	s.t.
7	Laurent Brochard (FRA)	Festina–Lotus	s.t.
8	Alexander Gontchenkov (UKR)	Roslotto–ZG Mobili	s.t.
9	Rolf Sörensen (DEN)	Rabobank	s.t.
10	Peter Van Petegem (BEL)	TVM–Farm Frites	s.t.
