= 2002 La Flèche Wallonne =

Race details
- Dates: 17 April 2002
- Stages: 1
- Distance: 198 km (123.0 mi)
- Winning time: 4h 42' 04"

Results
	Winner	Mario Aerts (BEL)	(Lotto–Adecco)
	Second	Unai Etxebarria (VEN)	(Euskaltel–Euskadi)
	Third	Michele Bartoli (ITA)	(Fassa Bortolo)

The 2002 La Flèche Wallonne was the 66th edition of La Flèche Wallonne cycle race and was held on 17 April 2002. The race started in Charleroi and finished in Huy. The race was won by Mario Aerts of the Lotto team.

== General classification ==
Final general classification

Rank	Rider	Team	Time
1	Mario Aerts (BEL)	Lotto–Adecco	4h 42' 04"
2	Unai Etxebarria (VEN)	Euskaltel–Euskadi	+ 3"
3	Michele Bartoli (ITA)	Fassa Bortolo	+ 6"
4	Andrea Noè (ITA)	Mapei–Quick-Step	+ 6"
5	José Azevedo (POR)	ONCE–Eroski	+ 6"
6	Axel Merckx (BEL)	Domo–Farm Frites	+ 6"
7	Dario Frigo (ITA)	Tacconi Sport	+ 6"
8	David Etxebarria (ESP)	Euskaltel–Euskadi	+ 6"
9	Michael Boogerd (NED)	Rabobank	+ 6"
10	Francesco Casagrande (ITA)	Fassa Bortolo	+ 6"
