= 1999 Tirreno–Adriatico =

Race details
- Dates: 10–17 March 1999
- Stages: 8
- Distance: 1,401 km (870.5 mi)
- Winning time: 36h 03' 30"

Results
Jersey awarded to the overall winner	Winner	Michele Bartoli (ITA)	(Mapei–Quick-Step)
	Second	Davide Rebellin (ITA)	(Team Polti)
	Third	Stefano Garzelli (ITA)	(Mercatone Uno–Bianchi)

The 1999 Tirreno–Adriatico was the 34th edition of the Tirreno–Adriatico cycle race and was held from 10 March to 17 March 1999. The race started in Sorrento and finished in San Benedetto del Tronto. The race was won by Michele Bartoli of the Mapei team.

== Teams ==
Twenty-five teams participated in the race:

- Post Swiss Team
- Ballan–Alessio
- Banesto
- BigMat–Auber 93
- Cantina Tollo–Alexia Alluminio
- Cofidis
- Crédit Agricole
- Festina–Lotus
- Kelme–Costa Blanca
- Française des Jeux
- Lampre–Daikin
- Liquigas
- Mapei–Quick-Step
- Mercatone Uno–Bianchi
- Mobilvetta Design–Northwave
- Navigare–Gaerne
- ONCE–Deutsche Bank
- Riso Scotti–Vinavil
- Saeco–Cannondale
- Selle Italia
- Team Telekom
- Team Polti
- TVM–Farm Frites
- Vini Caldirola
- Vitalicio Seguros

== Route ==
Stage characteristics and winners
Stage	Date	Course	Distance	Type	Winner
1	10 March	Sorrento to Sorrento	131 km (81 mi)		Romāns Vainšteins (LAT)
2	11 March	Sorrento to Santa Maria Capua Vetere	178 km (111 mi)		Massimo Strazzer (ITA)
3	12 March	Santa Maria Capua Vetere to Luco dei Marsi	214 km (133 mi)		Mario Cipollini (ITA)
4	13 March	Luco dei Marsi to Paglieta	197 km (122 mi)		Paolo Bettini (ITA)
5	14 March	Paglieta to Torricella Sicura	198 km (123 mi)		Igor González de Galdeano (ESP)
6	15 March	Teramo to Alba Adriatica	170 km (110 mi)		Romāns Vainšteins (LAT)
7	16 March	Alba Adriatica to Civitanova Marche	160 km (99 mi)		Steven de Jongh (NED)
8	17 March	Civitanova to San Benedetto del Tronto	164 km (102 mi)		Ján Svorada (CZE)

== General classification ==
Final general classification

Rank	Rider	Team	Time
1	Michele Bartoli (ITA)	Mapei–Quick-Step	36h 03' 30"
2	Davide Rebellin (ITA)	Team Polti	+ 9"
3	Stefano Garzelli (ITA)	Mercatone Uno–Bianchi	+ 14"
4	Laurent Jalabert (FRA)	ONCE–Deutsche Bank	+ 21"
5	Igor González de Galdeano (ESP)	Vitalicio Seguros	+ 30"
6	Alessandro Spezialetti (ITA)	Mobilvetta Design–Northwave	+ 1' 56"
7	Bo Hamburger (DEN)	Cantina Tollo–Alexia Alluminio	+ 3' 57"
8	Christopher Jenner (FRA)	Crédit Agricole	+ 4' 26"
9	Oscar Camenzind (SUI)	Lampre–Daikin	+ 4' 26"
10	Davide Casarotto (ITA)	TVM–Farm Frites	+ 4' 27"
