= 2001 Liège–Bastogne–Liège =

Race details
- Dates: 22 April 2001
- Stages: 1
- Distance: 258 km (160 mi)
- Winning time: 6h 42' 38"

Results
	Winner	Oscar Camenzind (SUI)	(Mapei–Quick-Step)
	Second	Davide Rebellin (ITA)	(Liquigas–Pata)
	Third	David Etxebarria (ESP)	(Euskaltel–Euskadi)

The 2001 Liège–Bastogne–Liège was the 87th edition of the Liège–Bastogne–Liège cycle race and was held on 22 April 2001. The race started in Liège and finished in Ans. The race was won by Oscar Camenzind of the Lampre team.

== General classification ==
Final general classification

Rank	Rider	Team	Time
1	Oscar Camenzind (SUI)	Lampre–Daikin	6h 42' 38"
2	Davide Rebellin (ITA)	Liquigas–Pata	+ 0"
3	David Etxebarria (ESP)	Euskaltel–Euskadi	+ 0"
4	Francesco Casagrande (ITA)	Fassa Bortolo	+ 0"
5	Michael Boogerd (NED)	Rabobank	+ 0"
6	Raimondas Rumšas (LTU)	Lampre–Daikin	+ 25"
7	Marcos Serrano (ESP)	ONCE–Eroski	+ 25"
8	Erik Dekker (NED)	Rabobank	+ 25"
9	Markus Zberg (SUI)	Rabobank	+ 25"
10	Beat Zberg (SUI)	Rabobank	+ 25"
