= 1998 Tour of the Basque Country =

Race details
- Dates: 6–10 April 1998
- Stages: 5
- Distance: 887 km (551.2 mi)
- Winning time: 23h 37' 47"

Results
| | Winner | Íñigo Cuesta (ESP) | (ONCE) |
| | Second | Laurent Jalabert (FRA) | (ONCE) |
| | Third | Alex Zülle (SUI) | (Festina–Lotus) |

The 1998 Tour of the Basque Country was the 38th edition of the Tour of the Basque Country cycle race and was held from 6 April to 10 April 1998. The race started in Hondarribia and finished in Hernani. The race was won by Íñigo Cuesta of the ONCE team.

== General classification ==
Final general classification

| Rank | Rider | Team | Time |
|---|---|---|---|
| 1 | Íñigo Cuesta (ESP) | ONCE | 23h 37' 47" |
| 2 | Laurent Jalabert (FRA) | ONCE | + 3" |
| 3 | Alex Zülle (SUI) | Festina–Lotus | + 1' 10" |
| 4 | Michael Boogerd (NED) | Rabobank | + 1' 49" |
| 5 | Aitor Garmendia (ESP) | Banesto | + 1' 50" |
| 6 | Rodolfo Massi (ITA) | Casino–Ag2r | + 2' 27" |
| 7 | Mikel Zarrabeitia (ESP) | ONCE | + 2' 29" |
| 8 | Paolo Savoldelli (ITA) | Saeco–Cannondale | + 2' 31" |
| 9 | Beat Zberg (SUI) | Rabobank | + 2' 37" |
| 10 | Wladimir Belli (ITA) | Festina–Lotus | + 2' 42" |
