= 2001 Giro di Lombardia =

Race details
- Dates: 20 October 2001
- Stages: 1
- Distance: 256 km (159.1 mi)
- Winning time: 6h 38' 29"

Results
	Winner	Danilo Di Luca (ITA)	(Cantina Tollo–Acqua & Sapone)
	Second	Giuliano Figueras (ITA)	(Ceramiche Panaria–Fiordo)
	Third	Michael Boogerd (NED)	(Rabobank)

The 2001 Giro di Lombardia was the 95th edition of the Giro di Lombardia cycle race and was held on 20 October 2001. The race started in Varese and finished in Bergamo. The race was won by Danilo Di Luca of the Cantina Tollo team.

== General classification ==
Final general classification
Rank	Rider	Team	Time
1	Danilo Di Luca (ITA)	Cantina Tollo–Acqua & Sapone	6h 38' 29"
2	Giuliano Figueras (ITA)	Ceramiche Panaria–Fiordo	+ 0"
3	Michael Boogerd (NED)	Rabobank	+ 1"
4	Richard Virenque (FRA)	Domo–Farm Frites–Latexco	+ 4"
5	Michele Bartoli (ITA)	Fassa Bortolo	+ 1' 25"
6	Beat Zberg (SUI)	Rabobank	+ 1' 25"
7	Max Sciandri (GBR)	Lampre–Daikin	+ 1' 26"
8	Wladimir Belli (ITA)	Fassa Bortolo	+ 1' 27"
9	Niklas Axelsson (SWE)	Alessio	+ 1' 32"
10	Francisco Mancebo (ESP)	iBanesto.com	+ 2' 25"
