= List of wins by Kwantum–Decosol–Yoko and its successors =

This is a comprehensive list of victories of the Visma–Lease a Bike cycling team. The races are categorized according to the UCI Continental Circuits rules.

== 1984 – Kwantum–Decosol ==
Criterium Woerden, Joop Zoetemelk
Criterium Roosendaal, Adri van der Poel
Acht van Chaam, Jacques Hanegraaf
Ronde van Boxmeer, Ad Wijnands
Profronde van Made, Jacques Hanegraaf
Nacht van Peer, Ludo Peeters
Profronde van Surhuisterveen, Joop Zoetemelk
Draai van de Kaai, Adri van der Poel
Netherlands Road Race Championship, Jan Raas
Amstel Gold Race, Jacques Hanegraaf
Criterium Hansweert, Leo van Vliet
Criterium Ulvenhout, Jan Raas
Criterium Kwadendamme, Jan Raas
Criterium Venhuizen, Joop Zoetemelk
Scheldeprijs Vlaanderen, Ludo Peeters
Criterium Helden-Panningen, Ad Wijnands
Criterium Linne, Jan Raas
Ronde van Kortenhoef, Leo van Vliet
Criterium Echt, Hennie Kuiper
Criterium Ede, Jacques Hanegraaf
Criterium Dongen, Leo van Vliet
GP Raymond Impanis, Ad Wijnands
G.P Impanis, Ad Wijnands

== 1985 – Kwantum–Decosol ==
Ronde van Friesland, Jacques Hanegraaf
Criterium Roosendaal, Joop Zoetemelk
Profronde van Oostvoorne, Joop Zoetemelk
Züri Metzgete, Ludo Peeters
Overall Tour de Luxembourg, Jelle Nijdam
Profronde van Surhuisterveen, Gerrit Solleveld
Draai van de Kaai, Joop Zoetemelk
Wateringse Wielerdag, Maarten Ducrot
Overall Tour of Belgium, Ludo Peeters
Profronde van Made, Ludo Peeters
Binche-Tournai-Binche, Adri van der Poel
Overall Tirreno – Adriatico, Joop Zoetemelk

Stage 5, Joop Zoetemelk

Brabantse Pijl, Adri van der Poel
Criterium Wouw, Adri van der Poel
Netherlands Road Race Championship, Jacques Hanegraaf
Stage 4 Tour de France, Gerrit Solleveld
Stage 5 Tour de France, Henri Manders
Stage 9 Tour de France, Maarten Ducrot
Criterium Kloosterzande, Jelle Nijdam
Criterium Venhuizen, Adri van der Poel
Scheldeprijs Vlaanderen, Adri van der Poel
Clásica Ciclista San Sebastián, Adri van der Poel
Dutch Food Valley Classic, Joop Zoetemelk
World Road Race Championship, Joop Zoetemelk
GP d´Isbergues, Adri van der Poel
Paris – Bruxelles, Adri van der Poel
G.P Impanis, Jelle Nijdam
GP Raymond Impanis, Jelle Nijdam
Paris – Tours, Ludo Peeters

== 1986 – Kwantum–Decosol ==
Nationale Sluitingprijs – Putte-Kapellen, Adri van der Poel
Delta Profronde, Gerrit Solleveld
Acht van Chaam, Adri van der Poel
Overall Tour of Belgium, Nico Emonds
Mijl van Mares, Toine Poels
Ronde van Pijnacker, Gerrit Solleveld
Profronde van Made, Adri van der Poel
Tour of Flanders, Adri van der Poel
Criterium Bavel, Adri van der Poel
Criterium Hansweert, Ad Wijnands
Criterium Apeldoorn, Joop Zoetemelk
Stage 1 Critérium du Dauphiné, Hans Daams
Stage 4b Critérium du Dauphiné, Luc Roosen
Stage 7a Critérium du Dauphiné, Maarten Ducrot
Stage 7 Tour de France, Ludo Peeters

== 1987 – Superconfex–Yoko ==
Criterium Woerden, Joop Zoetemelk
Profronde van Oostvoorne, Jelle Nijdam
Nacht van Hengelo, Rolf Gölz
Overall Tour du Haut Var, Rolf Gölz
Delta Profronde, Jean-Paul van Poppel
Züri Metzgete, Rolf Gölz
Overall Tour Méditerranéen, Gerrit Solleveld
Overall Tour de Picardie, Jelle Nijdam
Profronde van Surhuisterveen, Joop Zoetemelk
Vuelta a Andalucía – Ruta Ciclista del Sol, Rolf Gölz
Kuurne–Bruxelles–Kuurne, Ludo Peeters
Dwars door Vlaanderen, Jelle Nijdam
Brabantse Pijl, Edwig Van Hooydonck
Amstel Gold Race, Joop Zoetemelk
Criterium Apeldoorn, Jelle Nijdam
Criterium Kloosterzande, Edwig Van Hooydonck
Criterium Hansweert, Cees Priem
Prologue Tour de France, Jelle Nijdam
Stage 1 Tour de France, Nico Verhoeven
Stages 8 & 17 Tour de France, Edwig Van Hooydonck
Stage 15 Tour de France, Rolf Gölz
Criterium Helden-Panningen, Jean-Paul van Poppel
Criterium Simpelveld, Jelle Nijdam
Criterium Tiel, Nico Verhoeven
Criterium Kamerik, Maarten Ducrot
GP Stad Zottegem, Nico Verhoeven

== 1988 – Superconfex–Yoko ==
GP Eddy Merckx, Edwig Van Hooydonck
Circuit de la vallée de la Lys, Jacques Hanegraaf
GP d'Ouverture La Marseillaise, Ad Wijnands
Vuelta Ciclista Asturias, Rolf Gölz
Wateringse Wielerdag, Gerrit Solleveld
Tour of Belgium, Frans Maassen
Vuelta a Andalucía – Ruta Ciclista Del Sol, Edwig Van Hooydonck
Profronde van Made, Jacques Hanegraaf
Profronde van Surhuisterveen, Jelle Nijdam
La Flèche Wallonne, Rolf Gölz
Amstel Gold Race, Jelle Nijdam
Scheldeprijs Vlaanderen, Jean-Paul van Poppel
Stage 4a Tour de Romandie, Frans Maassen
Binche-Tournai-Binche, Nico Emonds
Stage 6a Critérium du Dauphiné, Frans Maassen
Stages 3, 10, 17 & 22 Tour de France, Jean-Paul van Poppel
Stage 5 Tour de France, Jelle Nijdam
Stage 8 Tour de France, Rolf Gölz
Criterium Simpelveld, Jean-Paul van Poppel
GP Kanton Aargau, Arjan Jagt
Criterium Linne, Frans Maassen
Criterium Valkenswaard, Jean-Paul van Poppel
Dutch Food Valley Classic, Ronny Vlasskas
Paris – Bruxelles, Rolf Gölz
Milano–Torino, Rolf Gölz
Giro del Piemonte, Rolf Gölz

== 1989 – Superconfex–Yoko ==
Profronde van Oostvoorne, Jelle Nijdam
Delta Profronde, Jelle Nijdam
Acht van Chaam, Jelle Nijdam
Ronde van Boxmeer, Frans Maassen
Profronde van Made, Nico Verhoeven
Kuurne–Bruxelles–Kuurne, Edwig Van Hooydonck
Stage 5 Tirreno – Adriatico, Rolf Gölz
Kuurne–Bruxelles–Kuurne, Edwig Van Hooydonck
Tour of Flanders, Edwig Van Hooydonck
Gent–Wevelgem, Gerrit Solleveld
GP de Denain Porte du Hainaut, Edwig Van Hooydonck
Criterium Apeldoorn, Gerrit Solleveld
Netherlands Road Race Championship, Frans Maassen
Stage 4 & 14 Tour de France, Jelle Nijdam
Wincanton Classic, Frans Maassen
Criterium Heerhugowaard, Gert Jakobs
Criterium Helden-Panningen, Frans Maassen
GP Stad Zottegem, Gino Van Hooydonck
Paris–Bruxelles, Jelle Nijdam
Paris–Tours, Jelle Nijdam
Milano–Torino, Rolf Gölz

== 1990 – Buckler–Colnago ==
GP Eddy Merckx, Frans Maassen
Ronde van Nederland, Jelle Nijdam
Criterium Woerden, Jelle Nijdam
Rund um Köln, Noël Segers
Étoile de Bessèges, Frans Maassen
Vuelta Ciclista a Murcia – Costa Calida, Tom Cordes
Profronde van Heerlen, Peter Winnen
Acht van Chaam, Gerrit Solleveld
Profronde van Stiphout, Frans Maassen
Overall Tour of Belgium, Frans Maassen
Mijl van Mares, Frans Maassen
Gouden Pijl Emmen, Jelle Nijdam
Volta a la Comunidad Valenciana, Tom Cordes
Trofeo Luis Puig, Tom Cordes
Stage 5 Tirreno – Adriatico, Eric Vanderaerden
Dwars door Vlaanderen, Edwig Van Hooydonck
Brabantse Pijl, Frans Maassen
Binche-Tournai-Binche, Jelle Nijdam
Delta Profronde, Gerrit Solleveld
Stage 1 Critérium du Dauphiné, Rolf Gölz
Netherlands Road Race Championship, Peter Winnen
Stage 1 Tour de France, Frans Maassen
Stage 5 Tour de France, Gerrit Solleveld
Stage 6 Tour de France, Jelle Nijdam
Criterium Heerhugowaard, Gerrit de Vries
GP Stad Zottegem, Marco van der Hulst
Dutch Food Valley Classic, Wiebren Veenstra
GP Raymond Impanis, Wiebren Veenstra
G.P Impanis, Wiebren Veenstra
GP de Fourmies / La Voix du Nord, Frans Maassen

== 1991 – Buckler–Colnago ==
Ronde van Nederland, Frans Maassen
Criterium Woerden, Frans Maassen
Profronde van Oostvoorne, Steven Rooks
KBC Driedaagse van De Panne – Koksijde, Jelle Nijdam
GP d'Ouverture La Marseillaise, Edwig Van Hooydonck
Profronde van Made, Edwig Van Hooydonck
Profronde van Surhuisterveen, Wiebren Veenstra
Profronde van Heerlen, Frans Maassen
Nacht van Peer, Eric Vanderaerden
Delta Profronde, Wiebren Veenstra
Dwars door Vlaanderen, Eric Vanderaerden
Brabantse Pijl, Edwig Van Hooydonck
Tour of Flanders, Edwig Van Hooydonck
Amstel Gold Race, Frans Maassen
Netherlands Road Race Championship, Steven Rooks
Stage 5 Tour de France, Jelle Nijdam
Criterium Helden-Panningen, Jelle Nijdam
Dutch Food Valley Classic, Wiebren Veenstra
Criterium Valkenswaard, Steven Rooks
Schaal Sels – Merksem, Edwig Van Hooydonck
GP Raymond Impanis, Wiebren Veenstra
GP Impanis, Wiebren Veenstra
GP Jef Scherens Leuven, Wilco Zuijderwijk

== 1992 – Buckler–Colnago ==
GP Eddy Merckx, Jelle Nijdam
Ronde van Nederland, Jelle Nijdam
KBC Driedaagse van De Panne – Koksijde, Frans Maassen
GP d'Ouverture La Marseillaise, Edwig Van Hooydonck
Ronde van Pijnacker, Jelle Nijdam
GP de Denain Porte du Hainaut, Edwig Van Hooydonck
Stage 1 Vuelta a España, Jelle Nijdam
Stage 6 Vuelta a España, Edwig Van Hooydonck
Stage 17 Vuelta a España, Eric Vanderaerden

== 1993 – Wordperfect ==
Omloop van het Houtland Lichtervelde, Danny Daelman
KBC Driedaagse van De Panne – Koksijde, Eric Vanderaerden
Tour de Picardie, Frédéric Moncassin
Gouden Pijl Emmen, Frans Maassen
Brabantse Pijl, Edwig Van Hooydonck
Stage 2 Tour de Romandie, Edwig Van Hooydonck
Prologue & Stage 3 Critérium du Dauphiné, Raúl Alcalá
Stage 1 Critérium du Dauphiné, Frédéric Moncassin
Dutch Food Valley Classic, Rob Mulders
GP Jef Scherens Leuven, Frans Maassen
Kampioenschap van Vlaanderen, Sammie Moreels

== 1994 – Wordperfect ==
Overall Tour of Sweden, Erik Dekker
Halle–Ingooigem, Eric Van Lancker
Volta a la Comunidad Valenciana, Viatcheslav Ekimov
Profronde van Surhuisterveen, Erik Dekker
Overall Tour de Luxembourg, Frans Maassen
Stage 1 Vuelta Ciclista al Pais Vasco, Erik Dekker
Dutch Food Valley Classic, Viatcheslav Ekimov
Overall Tour DuPont, Viatcheslav Ekimov
Criterium Helden-Panningen, Rob Mulders
GP Stad Zottegem, Marc Wauters
Kampioenschap van Vlaanderen, Jelle Nijdam

== 1995 – Novell ==
GP Herning, Frédéric Moncassin
Klauterkoers Sweikhuisen, Erik Dekker
Overall Tour of Sweden, Erik Dekker
Profronde van Heerlen, Frans Maassen
Kuurne–Bruxelles–Kuurne, Frédéric Moncassin
Brabantse Pijl, Edwig Van Hooydonck
Rund um Köln, Erik Dekker
Stage 5 Tour de Suisse, Viatcheslav Ekimov
Stage 20 Tour de France, Djamolidine Abdoujaparov
GP Jef Scherens Leuven, Erik Dekker

== 1996 – Rabobank ==
Profronde van Almelo, Erik Dekker
Dokkum Woudenomloop, Koos Moerenhout
Ronde van Nederland, Rolf Sørensen
Overall Tour of Sweden, Michael Blaudzun
Nacht van Hengelo, Léon van Bon
Overall KBC Driedaagse van De Panne – Koksijde, Viatcheslav Ekimov
Nacht van Peer, Johan Bruyneel
Circuit Franco-Belge, Koos Moerenhout
Kuurne–Bruxelles–Kuurne, Rolf Sørensen
Stage 1 Tirreno–Adriatico, Léon van Bon
Stage 7 Tirreno–Adriatico, Rolf Sørensen
Klauterkoers Sweikhuisen, Michael Boogerd
Netherlands Time Trial Championship, Erik Dekker
Stage 6 Tour de France, Michael Boogerd
Stage 13 Tour de France, Rolf Sørensen
Profronde van Stiphout, Michael Boogerd
Wateringse Wielerdag, Michael Boogerd
Mijl van Mares, Michael Boogerd
Drielandenomloop, Danny Nelissen
Druivenkoers – Overijse, Erik Breukink

== 1997 – Rabobank ==
Ronde van Nederland, Erik Dekker
Profronde van Oostvoorne, Erik Breukink
Klauterkoers Sweikhuisen, Erik Dekker
Amsterdam Derny Race, Léon van Bon
Profronde van Stiphout, Erik Dekker
Acht van Chaam, Adri van der Poel
Profronde van Made, Léon van Bon
Profronde van Heerlen, Michael Boogerd
Route du Sud, Patrick Jonker
Jayco Bay Cycling Classic, Robbie McEwen
Prologue Tirreno – Adriatico, Rolf Sørensen
Stage 3b KBC Driedaagse van De Panne – Koksijde, Rolf Sørensen
Tour of Flanders, Rolf Sørensen
Netherlands Time Trial Championship, Erik Breukink
Stage 18 Vuelta a España, Léon van Bon
Stage 22 Vuelta a España, Max van Heeswijk

== 1998 – Rabobank ==
Ronde van Nederland, Rolf Sørensen
Criterium Roosendaal, Michael Boogerd
Profronde van Oostvoorne, Koos Moerenhout
Profronde van Almelo, Robbie McEwen
Amsterdam Derny Race, Maarten den Bakker
Trofeo Calvià, Léon van Bon
Profronde van Heerlen, Max van Heeswijk
Wateringse Wielerdag, Max van Heeswijk
Ronde van Boxmeer, Michael Boogerd
Profronde van Made, Michael Boogerd
Trofeo Palma, Léon van Bon
Overall Tour of Austria, Beat Zberg
Stage 5 Tirreno – Adriatico, Rolf Sørensen
Overall Setmana Catalana de Ciclisme, Michael Boogerd

Stage 3, Michael Boogerd

Stage 9 Tour de France, Léon van Bon
Netherlands Road Race Championship, Michael Boogerd
Switzerland Time Trial Championship Beat Zberg
Vattenfall Cyclassics, Léon van Bon
Netherlands Time Trial Championship, Patrick Jonker

== 1999 – Rabobank ==
Nacht van Hengelo, Erik Dekker
Amsterdam Derny Race, Michael Boogerd
Profronde van Almelo, Maarten den Bakker
Wateringse Wielerdag, Marc Lotz
Acht van Chaam, Michael Boogerd
Mijl van Mares, Robbie McEwen
Rothaus Regio-Tour International, Grischa Niermann
Rheinland-Pfalz Rundfahrt, Marc Wauters
GP Eddy Merckx, Marc Wauters
Jayco Bay Cycling Classic, Robbie McEwen
Stage 3 Volta a la Comunidad Valenciana, Michael Boogerd
Stage 5a Vuelta Ciclista al Pais Vasco, Michael Boogerd
Stage 5b Vuelta Ciclista al Pais Vasco, Koos Moerenhout
Overall Paris – Nice, Michael Boogerd
Amstel Gold Race, Michael Boogerd
GP de Wallonie, Patrick Jonker
Overall Tour de Luxembourg, Marc Wauters
Netherlands Road Race Championship, Maarten den Bakker
Stage 20 Tour de France, Robbie McEwen
Stage 1 Tour of Denmark, Rolf Sørensen
Giro dell´Emilia, Michael Boogerd
G.P. Beghelli, Michael Boogerd
Paris – Tours, Marc Wauters
Milano–Torino, Markus Zberg

== 2000 – Rabobank ==
Nacht van Hengelo, Michael Boogerd
Criterium Bavikhoeve, Erik Dekker
Peperbus Profspektakel Zwolle, Léon van Bon
Gouden Pijl Emmen, Erik Dekker
Profronde van Heerlen, Erik Dekker
Wateringse Wielerdag, Léon van Bon
Ronde van Boxmeer, Erik Dekker
Ronde van Pijnacker, Michael Boogerd
Nacht van Peer, Marc Wauters
Groningen-Münster, Aart Vierhouten
Stage 7 Tirreno – Adriatico, Michael Boogerd
Dutch Food Valley Classic, Steven de Jongh
Stages 1a & 3 Tour of Sweden, Erik Dekker
Netherlands Road Race Championship, Léon van Bon
Switzerland Road Race Championship, Markus Zberg
Stage 6 Tour de France, Léon van Bon
Stages 8, 11 & 17 Tour de France, Erik Dekker
Overall Tour of Denmark, Rolf Sørensen
Clásica Ciclista San Sebastián, Erik Dekker
Netherlands Time Trial Championship, Erik Dekker
Overall Ronde van Nederland, Erik Dekker

Prologue, Erik Dekker

Schaal Sels – Merksem, Steven de Jongh
Delta Profronde, Léon van Bon
Overall Rheinland-Pfalz Rundfahrt, Marc Wauters

Stage 3b, Marc Wauters

Nationale Sluitingprijs – Putte-Kapellen, Steven de Jongh

== 2001 – Rabobank ==
Criterium Volendam, Erik Dekker
Trofeo Calvià, Mathew Hayman
Spektakel van Steenwijk, Michael Boogerd
Wateringse Wielerdag, Michael Boogerd
Profronde van Surhuisterveen, Erik Dekker
Trofeo Alcudia, Michael Boogerd
GP Eddy Merckx, Erik Dekker
Vuelta a Andalucía, Erik Dekker
Stages 1 & 4 Volta a la Comunidad Valenciana, Michael Boogerd
Overall Guldensporentweedaagse, Erik Dekker

Stage 1, Erik Dekker

Stage 3 Tirreno – Adriatico, Markus Zberg
Stage 7 Tirreno – Adriatico, Michael Boogerd
Setmana Catalana de Ciclisme, Michael Boogerd
Brabantse Pijl, Michael Boogerd
Dutch Food Valley Classic, Steven de Jongh
Amstel Gold Race, Erik Dekker
Niedersachsen-Rundfahrt, Grischa Niermann
Rund um den Finanzplatz Eschborn–Frankfurt, Markus Zberg
GP Kanton Aargau, Karsten Kroon
Stage 2 Tour de France, Marc Wauters
Stage 8 Tour de France, Erik Dekker
Stage 6 Ronde van Nederland, Erik Dekker
Overall Rheinland-Pfalz Rundfahrt, Erik Dekker

Stage 1, Michael Boogerd
Stage 2, Erik Dekker

Stage 13 Vuelta a España, Beat Zberg

== 2002 – Rabobank ==
Criterium Roosendaal, Michael Boogerd
Trofeo Calvià, Erik Dekker
Peperbus Profspektakel Zwolle, Michael Boogerd
Gouden Pijl Emmen, Michael Boogerd
Draai van de Kaai, Michael Boogerd
Spektakel van Steenwijk, Levi Leipheimer
Acht van Chaam, Erik Dekker
Ronde van Boxmeer, Michael Boogerd
Route du Sud, Levi Leipheimer
Amstel Curaçao Race, Michael Boogerd
Stage 5 Vuelta a Andalucía, Erik Dekker
Overall Guldensporentweedaagse, Erik Dekker

Stage 1, Coen Boerman
Stage 3, Erik Dekker

Overall Tirreno – Adriatico, Erik Dekker

Stage 4, Erik Dekker

Stage 1 Vuelta Ciclista al Pais Vasco, Beat Zberg
Dutch Food Valley Classic, Bobbie Traksel
Stages 1b & 2 Tour of Sweden, Steven de Jongh
Stage 8 Tour de France, Karsten Kroon
Stage 16 Tour de France, Michael Boogerd
Netherlands Time Trial Championship, Erik Dekker
GP Stad Zottegem, Matthé Pronk
Stage 2 Ronde van Nederland, Steven de Jongh
Stage 6 Ronde van Nederland, Michael Boogerd
Schaal Sels – Merksem, Steven de Jongh
Belgium Time Trial Championship, marc Wauters
Stage 1 Ster Elektrotoer, Bobbie Traksel

== 2003 – Rabobank ==
Trofeo Calvià, Remmert Wielinga
Istrian Spring Trophy, Pieter Weening
Giro della Provincia di Lucca, Óscar Freire
Stage 1 Tour Méditerranéen, Bram de Groot
Stages 1 & 2 Vuelta a Andalucía, Óscar Freire
Stage 4 Vuelta a Andalucía, Remmert Wielinga
Kuurne–Bruxelles–Kuurne, Roy Sentjens
G.P Erik Breukink, Erik Dekker
Stage 7 Tirreno–Adriatico, Óscar Freire
Stage 2 Setmana Catalana de Ciclisme, Beat Zberg
E3 Prijs Vlaanderen, Steven de Jongh
Brabantse Pijl, Michael Boogerd
Stage 3a KBC Driedaagse van De Panne – Koksijde, Steven de Jongh
Stage 1 Internationale Thüringen-Rundfahrt U23, Pieter Weening
Stages 2, 4 & 5 Olympia´s Tour, Hans Dekkers
Stage 4 Tour de Luxembourg, Robert Bartko
Stage 2 Volta Ciclista a Catalunya, Bram de Groot
Stage 5 Volta Ciclista a Catalunya, Óscar Freire
Belgium Time Trial Championship, Marc Wauters
Netherlands Time Trial Championship, Maarten den Bakker
Schaal Sels – Merksem, Steven de Jongh

== 2004 – Rabobank ==
Trofeo Alcudia, Óscar Freire
Le Triptyque des Monts et Châteaux – Frasnes, Thomas Dekker
Amstel Curaçao Race, Óscar Freire
Circuit de Lorraine, Joost Posthuma
Overall Tour of Qatar, Robbie Hunter

Stages 3 & 5, Robbie Hunter

Tour du Haut Var, Marc Lotz
Trofeo Luis Puig, Óscar Freire
Kuurne–Bruxelles–Kuurne, Steven de Jongh
Overall Driedaagse West-Vlaanderen, Robert Bartko

Prologue, Robert Bartko

Stage 3 Tirreno – Adriatico, Óscar Freire
Milano – Sanremo, Óscar Freire
Stage 4 Setmana Catalana de Ciclisme, Levi Leipheimer
Overall Tour de Normandie, Thomas Dekker
Albert Achterhes Profronde van Drenthe, Erik Dekker
Rund um den Finanzplatz Eschborn–Frankfurt, Karsten Kroon
Overall Internationale Thüringen-Rundfahrt U23, Thomas Dekker

Stage 4, Thomas Dekker

Overall Olympia´s Tour, Thomas Dekker
Prologue & Stage 5, Thomas Dekker
Netherlands Time Trial Championship, Thomas Dekker
Netherlands Road Race Championship, Thomas Dekker
Stage 6 Critérium du Dauphiné, Michael Rasmussen
Stages 3 & 5 Tour de Suisse, Robbie Hunter
Profronde van Heerlen, Marc Lotz
GP Stad Kortrijk, Marc Wauters
Overall Ronde van Nederland, Erik Dekker

Stage 6, Erik Dekker

Stage 6 Vuelta a España, Óscar Freire
Rheinland-Pfalz Rundfahrt, Thomas Dekker
World Road Championship, Óscar Freire
Paris – Tours, Erik Dekker

== 2005 – Rabobank ==
Trofeo Palma de Mallorca, Óscar Freire
Trofeo Alcudia, Óscar Freire
Overall Tirreno – Adriatico, Óscar Freire

Stages 2, 3 & 4, Óscar Freire

Stage 6 Paris – Nice, Joost Posthuma
Nokere Koerse, Steven de Jongh
Brabantse Pijl, Óscar Freire
Stage 2 Critérium International, Thomas Dekker
Scheldeprijs Vlaanderen, Thorwald Veneberg
UNIQA Classic, Bram de Groot
Stage 3 Volta Ciclista a Catalunya, Pedro Horrillo
Nacht van Hengelo, Joost Posthuma
Stage 3 Ster Elektrotoer, Jukka Vastaranta
Stage 3 Tour of Austria, Maarten den Bakker
Stage 8 Tour de France, Pieter Weening
Stage 9 Tour de France, Michael Rasmussen
Overall Sachsen-Tour International, Mathew Hayman
Ronde van Boxmeer, Michael Boogerd
Wateringse Wielerdag, Pieter Weening
Profronde van Heerlen, Michael Rasmussen
Profronde van Surhuisterveen, Pieter Weening
Mijl van Mares, Pieter Weening
Netherlands Time Trial Championship, Thomas Dekker
GP Stad Zottegem, Thomas Dekker
Overall Vuelta a España, Denis Menchov
Stages 1 & 9, Denis Menchov
Belgium Time Trial Championship, Marc Wauters
GP Jef Scherens Leuven, Joost Posthuma
Stage 8 Tour de Pologne, Thomas Dekker
Delta Profronde, Bram de Groot

== 2006 – Rabobank ==
Australia Road Race Championships, William Walker
Stage 1 Volta a la Comunidad Valenciana, Alexandr Kolobnev
Overall Tirreno – Adriatico, Thomas Dekker

Stage 3, Óscar Freire

Brabantse Pijl, Óscar Freire
Overall Tour de Normandie, Kai Reus

Prologue & Stage 5, Kai Reus

Stage 1 Critérium International, Erik Dekker
Stage 4 Vuelta Ciclista al Pais Vasco, Óscar Freire
Ronde van Noord-Holland, Kai Reus
Liège – Bastogne – Liège U23, Kai Reus
Nacht van Hengelo, Erik Dekker
Stage 4 Critérium du Dauphiné, Denis Menchov
Stage 2 Ster Elektrotoer, Erik Dekker
Stage 7 Tour de Suisse, Óscar Freire
Netherlands Road Race Championships, Michael Boogerd
GP Gerrie Knetemann, Roy Sentjens
Stages 5 & 9 Tour de France, Óscar Freire
Stage 11 Tour de France, Denis Menchov
Stage 16 Tour de France, Michael Rasmussen
Stage 1 Sachsen-Tour International, Pedro Horrillo
Ronde van Boxmeer, Michael Boogerd
Acht van Chaam, Michael Boogerd
Nacht van Peer, Marc Wauters
Wateringse Wielerdag, Óscar Freire
Profronde van Heerlen, Óscar Freire
Vattenfall Cyclassics, Óscar Freire
Draai van de Kaai, Óscar Freire
Ronde van Maastricht, Joost Posthuma
Profronde van Oostvoorne, Michael Boogerd
Stages 4 & 8 Deutschland Tour, Graeme Brown
Peperbus Profspektakel Zwolle, Michael Boogerd
Profronde van Almelo, Joost Posthuma
Tour de Rijke, Graeme Brown

== 2007 – Rabobank ==
Trofeo Mallorca, Óscar Freire
Trofeo Pollença, Thomas Dekker
Overall Vuelta a Andalucía, Óscar Freire

Stage 2 & 5, Óscar Freire
Stage 3, Max van Heeswijk

Stage 1 Tour of California, Graeme Brown
Stage 3 Vuelta a Murcia, Graeme Brown
Nokere Koerse, Léon van Bon
Milan–San Remo, Óscar Freire
Brabantse Pijl, Óscar Freire
Overall Tour de Romandie, Thomas Dekker

Stage 5, Thomas Dekker

Stage 5 Volta a Catalunya, Denis Menchov
Stage 4 Tour of Belgium, Robert Gesink
Stage 5 Tour de Suisse, Thomas Dekker
Overall Ster Elektrotoer, Sebastian Langeveld
Stages 8 & 17 Tour de France, Michael Rasmussen
Overall Sachsen-Tour International, Joost Posthuma

Stage 4, Joost Posthuma

Stage 5 Danmark Rundt, Rick Flens
Overall Vuelta a España, Denis Menchov

Stages 2, 5 & 6, Óscar Freire
Stage 10, Denis Menchov

Stage 2 Tour de Pologne, Graeme Brown
Overall 3-Länder-Tour, Thomas Dekker

Stages 2 & 4, Thomas Dekker

== 2008 – Rabobank ==
Stage 1 Vuelta a Murcia, Graeme Brown
Stages 1, 4 & 6 Tirreno–Adriatico, Óscar Freire
Stage 1 Critérium International, Laurens ten Dam
Overall Driedaagse van De Panne, Joost Posthuma

Stage 4, Joost Posthuma

Gent–Wevelgem, Óscar Freire
Overall Tour de Luxembourg, Joost Posthuma
Stage 1 Tour de Suisse, Óscar Freire
Points classification Tour de France, Óscar Freire

Stage 14, Óscar Freire

Stage 11 Vuelta a España, Óscar Freire
Circuit Franco-Belge, Juan Antonio Flecha

== 2009 – Rabobank ==
Stage 3 Tour Down Under, Graeme Brown
Overall Vuelta a Andalucía, Joost Posthuma
Overall Vuelta a Murcia, Denis Menchov

Stages 1 & 5 Graeme Brown

Nokere Koerse, Graeme Brown
Overall Tour of Belgium, Lars Boom
Overall Giro d'Italia, Denis Menchov

Stages 5, 10 & 12, Denis Menchov

Stage 8 Critérium du Dauphiné Libéré, Stef Clement
Stage 20 Tour de France, Juan Manuel Gárate
Stage 15 Vuelta a España, Lars Boom
Overall Giro dell'Emilia, Robert Gesink

== 2010 – Rabobank ==
Trofeo Cala Millor, Óscar Freire
Stages 2 & 3 Vuelta a Andalucía, Óscar Freire
Prologue Paris–Nice, Lars Boom
Milan–San Remo, Óscar Freire
Stage 1 Delta Tour Zeeland, Jos van Emden
Stage 1 Ster Elektrotour, Jos van Emden
Stage 5 Tour of Austria, Nick Nuyens
Stage 7 Tour of Austria, Joost Posthuma
Stage 7 Tour of Austria, Graeme Brown
Grand Prix Cycliste de Montréal, Robert Gesink
Overall Giro dell'Emilia, Robert Gesink
Overall Paris–Tours, Óscar Freire

== 2011 – Rabobank ==
Stage 3 Tour Down Under, Michael Matthews
Prologue Tour of Qatar, Lars Boom
Overall Tour of Oman, Robert Gesink

Stages 1 & 3, Theo Bos
Stages 4 & 5, Robert Gesink

Stages 4 & 5 Vuelta a Andalucía, Óscar Freire
Omloop Het Nieuwsblad, Sebastian Langeveld
Stage 1 Vuelta a Murcia, Michael Matthews
Stage 1 Tirreno–Adriatico, Team Time Trial
Rund um Köln, Michael Matthews
Stage 5 Giro d'Italia, Pieter Weening
Prologue Critérium du Dauphiné, Lars Boom
Tour de Rijke, Theo Bos
Prologue Delta Tour Zeeland, Jos van Emden
Stage 6 Tour de Suisse, Steven Kruijswijk
Netherlands Time Trial Championships, Jos van Emden
Spain Time Trial Championships, Luis León Sánchez
Stage 9 Tour de France, Luis León Sánchez
Stage 6 Danmark Rundt, Theo Bos
Dutch Food Valley Classic, Theo Bos
Overall Tour of Britain, Lars Boom

Stages 3 & 6, Lars Boom

== 2012 – Rabobank ==
Spain Time Trial Championships, Luis León Sánchez
Clásica de Almería, Michael Matthews
Stage 6 Paris–Nice, Luis León Sánchez
Dwars door Drenthe, Theo Bos
Stage 2 Vuelta a Castilla y León, Luis León Sánchez
Stages 1 & 8 Tour of Turkey, Theo Bos
Stage 4 Tour of Turkey, Mark Renshaw
Stages 3 & 4 Tour de Romandie, Luis León Sánchez
Overall Tour of California, Robert Gesink

Stage 7, Robert Gesink

Stage 3 Ster ZLM Toer, Lars Boom
Stage 14 Tour de France, Luis León Sánchez
Stage 3 Vuelta a Burgos, Matti Breschel
Stage 4 Vuelta a Burgos, Paul Martens
Overall Eneco Tour, Lars Boom

Stage 3, Theo Bos

Stage 3 Tour of Utah, Michael Matthews
Clásica de San Sebastián, Luis León Sánchez
Dutch Food Valley Classic, Theo Bos
Stage 2 World Ports Classic, Theo Bos
Memorial Rik Van Steenbergen, Theo Bos

== 2013 – Blanco / Belkin ==
Overall Tour Down Under, Tom-Jelte Slagter

Stage 3, Tom-Jelte Slagter

Stage 2 (ITT) Tour Méditerranéen, Lars Boom
Stage 1 Volta ao Algarve, Paul Martens
Stage 2 Volta ao Algarve, Theo Bos
Stage 2 Tour du Haut Var, Lars Boom
Stages 1 & 2 Tour de Langkawi, Theo Bos
Clásica de Almería, Mark Renshaw
Stage 6 Tour de Langkawi, Tom Leezer
Stage 1 Critérium International, Theo Bos
Stage 3 Tour of Norway, Theo Bos
Stage 5 Tour of Belgium, Luis León Sánchez
Stage 2 Tour de Suisse, Bauke Mollema
Overall Ster ZLM Toer, Lars Boom

Stage 1 (ITT), Robert Wagner
Stage 2, Theo Bos
Stage 4, Lars Boom

Overall Tour de Luxembourg, Paul Martens
Overall Danmark Rundt, Wilco Kelderman

Stage 5 (ITT), Wilco Kelderman

Stage 3 Tour de l'Ain, Luis León Sánchez
Stage 1 Eneco Tour, Mark Renshaw
Stage 2 World Ports Classic, Maarten Tjallingii
Stage 17 Vuelta a España, Bauke Mollema
Grand Prix Cycliste de Québec, Robert Gesink
GP Impanis-Van Petegem, Sep Vanmarcke
Münsterland Giro, Jos van Emden
Overall Tour of Hainan, Moreno Hofland

Stages 1, 6 & 8, Moreno Hofland
Stages 2, 3, 4, 5, 7 & 9, Theo Bos

Norway National Cyclo-cross championships, Lars Petter Nordhaug

== 2014 – Belkin ==
Stage 4 Vuelta a Andalucía, Moreno Hofland
Stages 2, 7, 8 & 9 Tour de Langkawi, Theo Bos
Stage 2 Paris–Nice, Moreno Hofland
Stage 6 Volta a Catalunya, Stef Clement
Volta Limburg Classic, Moreno Hofland
Stage 3 Tour of Norway, Sep Vanmarcke
Stage 4 Tour of Norway, Bauke Mollema
Overall World Ports Classic, Theo Bos
Stage 5 Tour of Belgium, Paul Martens
Ronde van Zeeland Seaports, Theo Bos
Stage 5 Tour de France, Lars Boom
Stages 1 & 3 Tour of Utah, Moreno Hofland
Stage 3 Tour de Pologne, Theo Bos
Overall Arctic Race of Norway, Steven Kruijswijk

Stage 1, Lars Petter Nordhaug

Stage 3 Tour of Alberta, Sep Vanmarcke
Stage 4 Tour of Alberta, Theo Bos
Stage 3 Tour de l'Eurometropole, Theo Bos
Stage 1 Tour of Hainan, Moreno Hofland

== 2015 – LottoNL–Jumbo ==
Stage 2 Tour de Yorkshire, Moreno Hofland
Stage 3 Ster ZLM Toer, Moreno Hofland
Netherlands Time Trial Championship, Wilco Kelderman
Stage 4 (ITT) Eneco Tour, Jos van Emden
Prologue (ITT) Tour de l'Ain, Mike Teunissen
Stage 7 Vuelta a España, Bert-Jan Lindeman

== 2016 – LottoNL–Jumbo ==
Stage 3 Volta a la Comunitat Valenciana, Dylan Groenewegen
Stage 1 Driedaagse van West-Vlaanderen, Dylan Groenewegen
Stage 1 Tour de Yorkshire, Dylan Groenewegen
Stage 9 (ITT) Giro d'Italia, Primož Roglič
Heistse Pijl, Dylan Groenewegen
Slovenia National Time Trial Championships, Primož Roglič
Rund um Köln, Dylan Groenewegen
Overall Ster ZLM Toer, Sep Vanmarcke

Stage 1 (ITT), Jos van Emden
Stage 3, Dylan Groenewegen
Stage 4, Sep Vanmarcke

Belgium National Time Trial Championships, Victor Campenaerts
Netherlands National Road Race Championships, Dylan Groenewegen
Arnhem–Veenendaal Classic, Dylan Groenewegen
Stage 2 Tour du Poitou-Charentes, Tom Van Asbroeck
Stage 14 Vuelta a España, Robert Gesink
Stage 4 Tour of Britain, Dylan Groenewegen
Stage 1 Eneco Tour, Dylan Groenewegen

== 2017 – LottoNL–Jumbo ==
Stage 3 (ITT) Vuelta a Andalucía, Victor Campenaerts
Overall Volta ao Algarve, Primož Roglič
Dwars door West-Vlaanderen, Jos van Emden
Stages 4 & 6 (ITT) Tour of the Basque Country, Primož Roglič
Stage 1 Tour de Yorkshire, Dylan Groenewegen
Stage 5 (ITT) Tour de Romandie, Primož Roglič
Stages 2 & 4 Tour of Norway, Dylan Groenewegen
Overall Tour of California, George Bennett
Stage 2 Tour des Fjords, Timo Roosen
Stage 21 (ITT) Giro d'Italia, Jos van Emden
Stage 3 Critérium du Dauphiné, Koen Bouwman
Prologue Ster ZLM Toer, Primož Roglič
Stages 2 & 3 Ster ZLM Toer, Dylan Groenewegen
Stage 17 Tour de France, Primož Roglič
Stage 21 Tour de France, Dylan Groenewegen
Europe Time Trial Championships, Victor Campenaerts
Stage 1 Tour de l'Ain, Juan José Lobato
Stage 5 BinckBank Tour, Lars Boom

== 2018 – LottoNL–Jumbo ==
Stage 1 Volta a la Comunitat Valenciana, Danny van Poppel
Stage 1 Dubai Tour, Dylan Groenewegen
Stages 1 & 4 Volta ao Algarve, Dylan Groenewegen
Kuurne–Brussels–Kuurne, Dylan Groenewegen
Stage 2 Paris–Nice, Dylan Groenewegen
Stage 3 Tirreno–Adriatico, Primož Roglič
Stage 1a Settimana Internazionale di Coppi e Bartali, Pascal Eenkhoorn
Overall Tour of the Basque Country, Primož Roglič

Stage 4 (ITT), Primož Roglič

Overall Tour de Romandie, Primož Roglič
Stage 5 Giro d'Italia, Enrico Battaglin
Stages 1, 3 & 4 Tour of Norway, Dylan Groenewegen
Overall Tour of Slovenia, Primož Roglič

Stage 2, Dylan Groenewegen
Stages 4 & 5 (ITT), Primož Roglič

Halle–Ingooigem, Danny van Poppel
Stages 7 & 8 Tour de France, Dylan Groenewegen
Stages 19 Tour de France, Primož Roglič
Overall Tour of Utah, Sepp Kuss

Stages 2, 5 & 6, Sepp Kuss

Stage 3 Colorado Classic, Pascal Eenkhoorn
Arnhem–Veenendaal Classic, Dylan Groenewegen
Stage 5 (TTT) Tour of Britain (Note: The riders on the squad were Primož Roglič, Koen Bouwman, Pascal Eenkhoorn, Jos van Emden, Neilson Powless and Maarten Wynants)
Kampioenschap van Vlaanderen, Dylan Groenewegen
Binche–Chimay–Binche, Danny van Poppel
Stage 1 Tour of Guangxi, Dylan Groenewegen

== 2019 – Team Jumbo–Visma ==
Stage 5 Volta a la Comunitat Valenciana, Dylan Groenewegen
Stage 4 Volta ao Algarve, Dylan Groenewegen
Overall UAE Tour, Primož Roglič

Stage 1 (TTT) (Note: The winning riders were Primož Roglič, Koen Bouwman, Laurens De Plus, Tom Leezer, Paul Martens, Tony Martin and Jos van Emden)
Stage 6, Primož Roglič

Stages 1 & 2 Paris Nice, Dylan Groenewegen
Overall Tirreno–Adriatico, Primož Roglič
Three Days of Bruges–De Panne, Dylan Groenewegen
Overall Tour de Romandie, Primož Roglič

Stages 1, 4 & 5 (ITT), Primož Roglič

Stages 1 (ITT) & 9 (ITT) Giro d'Italia, Primož Roglič
Overall Four Days of Dunkirk, Mike Teunissen

Stages 1, 2 & 3, Dylan Groenewegen
Stage 5 & 6, Mike Teunissen

Overall Hammer Stavanger

Stage 1

Stages 4 & 5 (ITT) Critérium du Dauphiné, Wout van Aert
Stage 6 Tour de Suisse, Antwan Tolhoek
Overall ZLM Tour, Mike Teunissen

Prologue, Jos van Emden
Stages 1 & 2, Dylan Groenewegen
Stage 3, Amund Grøndahl Jansen

Netherlands National Time Trial Championships, Jos van Emden
Belgium National Time Trial Championships, Wout van Aert
Germany National Time Trial Championships, Tony Martin
Norway National Road Race Championships, Amund Grøndahl Jansen
Stage 1 Tour de France, Mike Teunissen
Stage 2 (TTT) (Note: The winning riders were Mike Teunissen, Dylan Groenewegen, Laurens De Plus, Amund Grøndahl Jansen, Tony Martin, George Bennett, Steven Kruijswijk and Wout van Aert) Tour de France
Stage 7 Tour de France, Dylan Groenewegen
Stage 10 Tour de France, Wout van Aert
Stage 6 Tour de Pologne, Jonas Vingegaard
Overall BinckBank Tour, Laurens De Plus
Stages 1, 3 & 5 Tour of Britain, Dylan Groenewegen
Overall Vuelta a España, Primož Roglič

Points classification, Primož Roglič
Stage 10 (ITT), Primož Roglič
Stage 15, Sepp Kuss

Giro dell'Emilia, Primož Roglič
Tre Valli Varesine, Primož Roglič
Tacx Pro Classic, Dylan Groenewegen
Chrono des Nations, Jos van Emden

== 2020 – Team Jumbo–Visma ==
Stages 1 & 3 Volta a la Comunitat Valenciana, Dylan Groenewegen
Stage 4 UAE Tour, Dylan Groenewegen
Slovenia National Road Race Championships, Primož Roglič
Strade Bianche, Wout van Aert
Milan–San Remo, Wout van Aert
Overall Tour de l'Ain, Primož Roglič

Stages 2 & 3, Primož Roglič

Giro del Piemonte, George Bennett
Stage 1 Critérium du Dauphiné, Wout van Aert
Stage 2 Critérium du Dauphiné, Primož Roglič
Stage 5 Critérium du Dauphiné, Sepp Kuss
Belgium National Time Trial Championships, Wout van Aert
Stage 4 Tour de France, Primož Roglič
Stages 5 & 7 Tour de France, Wout van Aert
Liège–Bastogne–Liège, Primož Roglič
Overall Vuelta a España, Primož Roglič

Points classification, Primož Roglič
Stages 1, 8, 10 & 13 (ITT), Primož Roglič

== 2021 – Team Jumbo–Visma ==
Belgium National Cyclo-cross Championships, Wout van Aert
New Zealand National Road Race Championships, George Bennett
Stage 5 UAE Tour, Jonas Vingegaard
Stages 4, 6 & 7 Paris–Nice, Primož Roglič
Stages 1 & 7 (ITT) Tirreno–Adriatico, Wout van Aert
Overall Settimana Internazionale di Coppi e Bartali, Jonas Vingegaard

Stages 2 & 4, Jonas Vingegaard

Gent–Wevelgem, Wout van Aert
Overall Tour of the Basque Country, Primož Roglič

Stage 1 (ITT), Primož Roglič

Amstel Gold Race, Wout van Aert
Netherlands National Time Trial Championships, Tom Dumoulin
Norway National Time Trial Championships, Tobias Foss
Germany National Time Trial Championships, Tony Martin
Netherlands National Road Race Championships, Timo Roosen
Norway National Road Race Championships, Tobias Foss
Belgium National Road Race Championships, Wout van Aert
Stages 11, 20 (ITT) & 21 Tour de France, Wout van Aert
Stage 15 Tour de France, Sepp Kuss
Stages 1 & 4 Tour de Wallonie, Dylan Groenewegen
Olympic Time Trial, Primož Roglič
Heistse Pijl, Pascal Eenkhoorn
Stage 1 Danmark Rundt, Dylan Groenewegen
Overall Vuelta a España, Primož Roglič

Stages 1 (ITT), 11, 17 & 21 (ITT) Primož Roglič

Overall Tour of Britain, Wout van Aert

Stages 1, 4, 6 & 8, Wout van Aert

Stages 2 & 4 CRO Race, Olav Kooij
Giro dell'Emilia, Primož Roglič
Stage 6 CRO Race, Tim van Dijke
Milano–Torino, Primož Roglič

== 2022 – Team Jumbo–Visma ==
Belgium National Cyclo-cross Championships, Wout van Aert
Australia National Time Trial Championships, Rohan Dennis
Omloop Het Nieuwsblad, Wout van Aert
La Drôme Classic, Jonas Vingegaard
Overall Paris–Nice, Primož Roglič

Stage 1, Christophe Laporte
Stage 4 (ITT), Wout van Aert
Stage 7, Primož Roglič

E3 Saxo Bank Classic, Wout van Aert
Stage 1 (ITT) Tour of the Basque Country, Primož Roglič
Overall Circuit de la Sarthe, Olav Kooij

Stages 2 & 4, Olav Kooij

Stage 1 Tour de Hongrie, Olav Kooij
Mountains classification Giro d'Italia, Koen Bouwman

Stages 7 & 19, Koen Bouwman

Overall Critérium du Dauphiné, Primož Roglič

Stages 1 & 5, Wout van Aert
Stage 8, Jonas Vingegaard

Overall Ster ZLM Toer, Olav Kooij

Stages 1, 2 & 5, Olav Kooij

Norway National Time Trial Championships, Tobias Foss
Netherlands National Road Race Championships, Pascal Eenkhoorn
Prologue Sibiu Cycling Tour, Tim van Dijke
Overall Tour de France, Jonas Vingegaard

Points classification, Wout van Aert
Mountains classification, Jonas Vingegaard
Stages 4, 8 & 20, Wout van Aert
Stages 11 & 18, Jonas Vingegaard
Stage 19, Christophe Laporte

Stage 1 Tour de Pologne, Olav Kooij
Stage 2 Vuelta a Burgos, Timo Roosen
Overall Danmark Rundt, Christophe Laporte

Stages 1 & 3, Olav Kooij
Stage 5, Christophe Laporte

Stage 1 (TTT) Vuelta a España (Note: The riders on the squad were Primož Roglič, Edoardo Affini, Rohan Dennis, Robert Gesink, Chris Harper, Sepp Kuss, Sam Oomen and Mike Teunissen)
Stage 4 Vuelta a España, Primož Roglič
Bretagne Classic, Wout van Aert
Stage 2 Okolo Slovenska, Archie Ryan
Stage 3 Okolo Slovenska, Koen Bouwman
World Time Trial Championships, Tobias Foss
Stages 3 & 5 CRO Race, Jonas Vingegaard
Münsterland Giro, Olav Kooij
Binche–Chimay–Binche, Christophe Laporte

== 2023 – Team Jumbo–Visma ==
Stage 2 Tour Down Under, Rohan Dennis
Overall O Gran Camiño, Jonas Vingegaard

Stages 2, 3 & 4 (ITT), Jonas Vingegaard

Omloop Het Nieuwsblad, Dylan van Baarle
Kuurne–Brussels–Kuurne, Tiesj Benoot
Stage 3 (TTT) Paris–Nice (Note: The riders on the squad were Jonas Vingegaard, Edoardo Affini, Rohan Dennis, Tobias Foss, Olav Kooij, Jan Tratnik and Nathan Van Hooydonck)
Stage 5 Paris–Nice, Olav Kooij
Overall Tirreno–Adriatico, Primož Roglič

Stages 4, 5 & 6, Primož Roglič

Ronde van Drenthe, Per Strand Hagenes
Overall Volta a Catalunya, Primož Roglič

Stages 1 & 5, Primož Roglič

E3 Saxo Classic, Wout van Aert
Gent–Wevelgem, Christophe Laporte
Dwars door Vlaanderen, Christophe Laporte
Overall Tour of the Basque Country, Jonas Vingegaard

Stages 3, 4 & 6, Jonas Vingegaard

Stages 1 & 4 Four Days of Dunkirk, Olav Kooij
Stage 5 Four Days of Dunkirk, Per Strand Hagenes
Overall Giro d'Italia, Primož Roglič

Stage 20, Primož Roglič

Heistse Pijl, Olav Kooij
Overall Critérium du Dauphiné, Jonas Vingegaard

Stages 1 & 3, Christophe Laporte
Stages 5 & 7, Jonas Vingegaard

Overall ZLM Tour, Olav Kooij

Stage 4, Olav Kooij

Netherlands National Time Trial Championships, Jos van Emden
Hungary National Time Trial Championships, Attila Valter
Belgium National Time Trial Championships, Wout van Aert
Hungary National Road Race Championships, Attila Valter
Netherlands National Road Race Championships, Dylan van Baarle
Overall Tour de France, Jonas Vingegaard

Stage 16, Jonas Vingegaard

Stage 3 Czech Tour, Johannes Staune-Mittet
Stage 4 Tour de Pologne, Olav Kooij
Overall Vuelta a Burgos, Primož Roglič

Stage 2 (TTT) (Note: The riders on the squad were Primož Roglič, Koen Bouwman, Jan Tratnik, Attila Valter, Robert Gesink, Edoardo Affini and Gijs Leemreize)
Stages 3 & 5, Primož Roglič

Overall Tour of Britain, Wout van Aert

Stages 1, 2, 3 & 4, Olav Kooij
Stage 5, Wout van Aert

Overall Vuelta a España, Sepp Kuss

Stage 6, Sepp Kuss
Stages 8 & 17, Primož Roglič
Stages 13 & 16, Jonas Vingegaard

Giro dell'Emilia, Primož Roglič
Coppa Bernocchi, Wout van Aert
Münsterland Giro, Per Strand Hagenes
Overall Tour of Guangxi, Milan Vader

Stages 3 & 6, Olav Kooij
Stage 4, Milan Vader

== 2024 – Visma–Lease a Bike ==
Clásica de Almería, Olav Kooij
Stage 3 Volta ao Algarve, Wout van Aert
Stage 5 UAE Tour, Olav Kooij
Overall O Gran Camiño, Jonas Vingegaard

Stages 2, 3 & 4, Jonas Vingegaard

Omloop Het Nieuwsblad, Jan Tratnik
Kuurne–Brussels–Kuurne, Wout van Aert
Overall Paris–Nice, Matteo Jorgenson

Stages 1 & 5, Olav Kooij

Overall Tirreno–Adriatico, Jonas Vingegaard

Stages 5 & 6, Jonas Vingegaard

Overall Settimana Internazionale di Coppi e Bartali, Koen Bouwman

Stage 3, Koen Bouwman

Dwars door Vlaanderen, Matteo Jorgenson
Stage 9 Giro d'Italia, Olav Kooij
Hungary National Road Race Championships, Attila Valter
Stage 11 Tour de France, Jonas Vingegaard
Stage 3 Czech Tour, Thomas Gloag
Overall Vuelta a Burgos, Sepp Kuss

Stage 3, Sepp Kuss

Overall Tour de Pologne, Jonas Vingegaard

Stages 4 & 7, Olav Kooij

Stages 3, 7 & 10 Vuelta a España, Wout van Aert
Hamburg Cyclassics, Olav Kooij
Paris–Tours, Christophe Laporte

== 2025 – Visma–Lease a Bike ==
Stages 1 & 4 Tour of Oman, Olav Kooij
Overall Volta ao Algarve, Jonas Vingegaard

Stage 5 (ITT), Jonas Vingegaard

Overall Paris–Nice, Matteo Jorgenson

Stage 3 (TTT) (Note: The riders in the squad were Matteo Jorgenson, Edoardo Affini, Victor Campenaerts, Per Strand Hagenes, Bart Lemmen, Jonas Vingegaard and Axel Zingle.)

Stage 4 Tirreno–Adriatico, Olav Kooij
Grand Prix de Denain, Matthew Brennan
Stages 1 & 5 Volta a Catalunya, Matthew Brennan
Overall Settimana Internazionale di Coppi e Bartali, Ben Tulett

Stage 4, Ben Tulett

Stage 1 Tour de Romandie, Matthew Brennan
Stage 1 Four Days of Dunkirk, Axel Zingle
Overall Giro d'Italia, Simon Yates

Stage 9, Wout van Aert
Stages 12 & 21, Olav Kooij

Overall Tour of Norway, Matthew Brennan

Stages 2 & 4, Matthew Brennan

Stage 10 Tour de France, Simon Yates
Stage 21 Tour de France, Wout van Aert
Stage 1 Tour de Pologne, Olav Kooij
Stage 5 Tour de Pologne, Matthew Brennan
Overall Tour de l'Ain, Cian Uijtdebroeks

Stage 3, Cian Uijtdebroeks

Stages 1 & 4 Deutschland Tour, Matthew Brennan
Stage 2 Renewi Tour, Olav Kooij
Overall Vuelta a España, Jonas Vingegaard

Stages 2, 9 & 20, Jonas Vingegaard

Stages 1, 2 & 6 Tour of Britain, Olav Kooij
Stage 3 Tour of Britain, Matthew Brennan
Grand Prix d'Isbergues, Olav Kooij
Overall Tour of Holland, Christophe Laporte

== 2026 – Visma–Lease a Bike ==
Stage 5 Tour Down Under, Matthew Brennan
Stage 1 Vuelta a Andalucía, Christophe Laporte
Kuurne–Brussels–Kuurne, Matthew Brennan
Overall Paris–Nice, Jonas Vingegaard

Stages 4 & 5, Jonas Vingegaard

Overall Volta a Catalunya, Jonas Vingegaard

Stages 5 & 6, Jonas Vingegaard

Paris–Roubaix, Wout van Aert
Overall Giro d'Italia, Jonas Vingegaard

Stages 7, 9, 14, 16 & 20, Jonas Vingegaard
Stage 19, Sepp Kuss

== Supplementary statistics ==
=== 1984 to 2004 ===
Grand Tours by highest finishing position
Race	1984	1985	1986	1987	1988	1989	1990	1991	1992	1993	1994	1995	1996	1997	1998	1999	2000	2001	2002	2003	2004
Giro d'Italia	–	–	–	–	–	–	–	–	–	–	–	–	–	–	–	–	68	–	17	–	–
Tour de France	30	12	24	49	89	99	64	26	17	27	36	18	21	13	5	56	24	10	12	28	9
Vuelta a España	–	–	–	–	–	–	–	9	10	–	–	25	–	65	27	20	–	31	–	7	48
Major week-long stage races by highest finishing position
Race	1984	1985	1986	1987	1988	1989	1990	1991	1992	1993	1994	1995	1996	1997	1998	1999	2000	2001	2002	2003	2004
Tour Down Under	Did not Exist															–	–	–	–	–	–
Paris–Nice	–	–	–	13	–	–	–	–	27	12	3	8	–	–	9	1	11	–	–	–	22
Tirreno–Adriatico	4	1	12	–	5	2	10	39	27	–	44	31	7	34	4	–	7	3	1	4	2
Volta a Catalunya	–	–	–	–	–	–	–	–	–	–	–	–	–	–	–	–	–	–	–	–	–
Tour of the Basque Country	–	–	–	2	30	14	2	38	10	11	18	14	34	11	4	7	9	7	4	7	5
Tour de Romandie	–	4	4	–	–	14	10	–	–	–	20	19	–	12	12	2	21	–	41	–	–
Critérium du Dauphiné	–	–	3	39	15	21	24	21	23	8	–	–	–	4	9	–	–	–	–	8	7
Tour de Suisse	–	–	56	–	–	–	–	96	–	17	–	20	15	11	2	11	8	4	26	–	17
Tour de Pologne	–	–	–	–	–	–	–	–	–	–	–	–	–	–	–	–	–	–	–	–	–
Ronde van Nederland	6	4	2	5	8	14	1	1	1	2	4	2	1	1	1	2	1	2	2	6	1
Monument races by highest finishing position
Monument	1984	1985	1986	1987	1988	1989	1990	1991	1992	1993	1994	1995	1996	1997	1998	1999	2000	2001	2002	2003	2004
Milan–San Remo	21	18	7	14	9	2	2	3	11	16	28	24	16	8	21	6	8	8	3	7	1
Tour of Flanders	11	15	1	9	22	1	15	1	3	2	9	8	9	1	18	6	7	2	25	9	5
Paris–Roubaix	7	9	3	5	19	3	3	17	12	6	20	8	8	6	4	6	7	28	20	4	31
Liège–Bastogne–Liège	9	29	2	28	–	66	11	9	2	32	45	17	9	18	5	2	8	8	13	3	2
Giro di Lombardia	2	2	–	–	18	8	24	18	23	32	26	36	33	39	2	6	4	3	6	4	2
Classics by highest finishing position
Classic	1984	1985	1986	1987	1988	1989	1990	1991	1992	1993	1994	1995	1996	1997	1998	1999	2000	2001	2002	2003	2004
Omloop Het Volk	3	2	NH	6	12	29	2	3	3	3	2	2	5	20	4	19	45	3	14	25	NH
Kuurne–Brussels–Kuurne	–	3	NH	1	3	1	2	8	8	NH	—	1	1	4	37	7	47	4	22	1	1
E3 Harelbeke	3	18	5	2	8	18	4	–	2	3	2	–	4	4	11	34	4	10	22	1	4
Gent–Wevelgem	5	8	2	9	4	42	4	4	5	2	16	15	5	23	17	10	18	36	71	10	37
Amstel Gold Race	1	7	2	1	1	39	3	1	9	12	19	25	16	10	2	1	2	1	3	2	2
La Flèche Wallonne	5	12	6	3	1	21	27	15	8	24	15	20	28	14	4	2	13	9	9	12	26
Clásica de San Sebastián	–	1	7	25	9	18	28	15	23	18	56	35	36	18	8	7	1	9	26	8	11
Paris–Tours	20	1	4	14	12	1	7	52	8	19	55	3	13	8	6	1	8	13	58	35	1

=== 2005 to 2022 ===
World Team Time Trial performance
World TTT Championships	2005	2006	2007	2008	2009	2010	2011	2012	2013	2014	2015	2016	2017	2018	2019	2020	2021	2022
Position	Did not Exist							5	12	14	6	5	7	13	Did not Exist			
Margin	Did not Exist							+ 1' 08"	+ 2' 49"	+ 2' 28"	+ 1' 17"	+ 55"	+ 1' 20"	+ 3' 28"	Did not Exist			
Grand Tours by highest finishing position
Race	2005	2006	2007	2008	2009	2010	2011	2012	2013	2014	2015	2016	2017	2018	2019	2020	2021	2022
Giro d'Italia	21	53	48	5	1	12	8	30	16	7	7	4	23	8	3	DNF (Note: The team pulled out on the second rest day after two positive coronavirus tests.)	9	20
Tour de France	7	5	34	3	52	4	32	28	6	9	6	32	38	4	3	2	2	1
Vuelta a España	2	24	1	7	6	41	3	6	52	14	37	10	9	4	1	1	1	30
Major week-long stage races by highest finishing position
Race	2005	2006	2007	2008	2009	2010	2011	2012	2013	2014	2015	2016	2017	2018	2019	2020	2021	2022
Tour Down Under	–	57	–	17	31	34	4	9	1	6	10	19	8	10	12	8	NH	
UAE Tour	Did not Exist														1	24	4	13
Paris–Nice	11	7	36	4	14	44	9	17	76	13	15	13	28	38	6	–	15	1
Tirreno–Adriatico	1	1	29	30	11	5	2	21	21	22	70	52	4	9	1	35	2	2
Volta a Catalunya	31	9	3	26	39	17	9	14	6	12	9	26	7	6	5	NH	12	10
Tour of the Basque Country	11	36	25	3	7	8	3	3	39	28	58	10	5	1	22	NH	1	6
Tour de Romandie	3	33	1	4	11	2	6	10	5	24	15	31	3	1	1	NH	14	7
Tour of California	NH	–	20	9	8	32	6	1	–	8	5	7	1	13	4	NH		
Critérium du Dauphiné	23	6	4	4	4	25	20	8	11	4	22	14	16	11	24	7	15	1
Tour de Suisse	38	24	36	10	29	5	3	4	2	3	9	8	3	8	33	NH	8	DNF (Note: The team did not start Stage 5 due to a positive Covid test.)
Tour de Pologne	2	5	2	13	4	3	33	30	25	8	21	22	32	4	13	8	10	60
BinckBank Tour	2	6	5	6	3	2	5	1	7	2	3	5	8	18	1	8	9	NH (Note: The race was cancelled due to an overcrowded calendar.)
Monument races by highest finishing position
Monument	2005	2006	2007	2008	2009	2010	2011	2012	2013	2014	2015	2016	2017	2018	2019	2020	2021	2022
Milan–San Remo	5	6	1	8	21	1	94	21	54	15	17	24	22	24	6	1	3	8
Tour of Flanders	11	12	35	3	15	22	5	9	11	3	53	3	58	14	14	2	6	9
Paris–Roubaix	19	4	2	12	5	31	3	6	2	4	11	4	33	16	7	NH	7	2
Liège–Bastogne–Liège	27	14	34	6	14	14	13	6	15	15	37	46	40	24	17	1	13	3
Il Lombardia	33	22	8	21	6	12	23	7	10	17	11	7	28	10	7	2	4	16
Classics by highest finishing position
Classic	2005	2006	2007	2008	2009	2010	2011	2012	2013	2014	2015	2016	2017	2018	2019	2020	2021	2022
Omloop Het Nieuwsblad	3	7	2	58	3	45	1	13	9	4	5	14	18	16	13	6	41	1
Kuurne–Brussels–Kuurne	6	21	20	2	5	2	48	15	NH	2	4	4	18	1	4	–	–	8
Strade Bianche	Did not Exist		–	–	–	–	–	–	18	–	4	22	24	13	3	1	4	31
E3 Harelbeke	7	18	12	55	7	5	5	11	49	5	5	8	43	80	2	NH	11	1
Gent–Wevelgem	14	–	3	1	4	12	9	3	23	4	6	2	18	38	5	8	1	2
Amstel Gold Race	10	17	8	5	3	11	6	10	10	7	27	23	11	16	21	NH	1	3
La Flèche Wallonne	5	24	9	4	57	14	10	7	9	4	10	13	15	20	15	31	2	11
Clásica de San Sebastián	18	14	12	6	11	7	12	1	9	2	24	15	21	8	25	NH	8	3
Paris–Tours	22	14	63	18	5	1	14	24	18	10	9	24	13	10	–	–	20	12

=== 2023 to present ===
Grand Tours by highest finishing position
Race	2023	2024	2025	2026
Giro d'Italia	1	22	1	1
Tour de France	1	2	2	13
Vuelta a España	1	14	1	
Major week-long stage races by highest finishing position
Race	2023	2024	2025	2026
Tour Down Under	25	5	8	14
UAE Tour	5	5	23	8
Paris–Nice	3	1	1	1
Tirreno–Adriatico	1	1	14	2
Volta a Catalunya	1	13	9	1
Tour of the Basque Country	1	41	17	29
Tour de Romandie	11	20	13	4
Critérium du Dauphiné	1	2	2	4
Tour de Suisse	4	9	20	10
Tour de Pologne	26	1	23	4
Benelux Tour	27	3	5	
Monument races by highest finishing position
Monument	2023	2024	2025	2026
Milan–San Remo	3	14	8	3
Tour of Flanders	4	15	4	4
Paris–Roubaix	3	16	4	1
Liège–Bastogne–Liège	7	12	12	13
Il Lombardia	3	21	10	
Classics by highest finishing position
Classic	2023	2024	2025	2026
Omloop Het Nieuwsblad	1	1	11	4
Kuurne–Brussels–Kuurne	1	1	2	1
Strade Bianche	3	10	22	8
E3 Harelbeke	1	3	9	2
Gent–Wevelgem	1	6	19	3
Amstel Gold Race	15	3	4	100
La Flèche Wallonne	7	9	12	3
Clásica de San Sebastián	10	34	4	3
Paris–Tours	6	1	2	

Legend
—	Did not compete
DNF	Did not finish
DNS	Did not start
NH	Not held
