= Tour of the Netherlands =

Dutch cycling race

- 2026 Tour of Holland

Race details
- Date: August
- Region: Netherlands
- Local name: Ronde van Nederland
- Discipline: Road
- Competition: UCI Europe Tour
- Type: Stage race

History
- First edition: 1948
- Editions: 46 (as of 2026)
- First winner: Emile Rogiers (BEL)
- Most wins: Gerrie Knetemann (NED) (4)
- Most recent: Victor Campenaerts (BEL)

The Tour of the Netherlands (Dutch: Ronde van Nederland) is a road bicycle racing stage-race in the Netherlands, founded in 1948.

It was an annual race since 1975. Because of the start of the UCI ProTour in 2005, it was replaced by the Eneco Tour.

The first edition started on April 24, from Dam Square, Amsterdam. The riders finished on May 1, nine days later, in the Olympisch Stadion.

The competition's roll of honor includes the successes of Rik Van Looy, Jan Janssen, Joop Zoetemelk and Laurent Fignon. The record of victories belongs to Gerrie Knetemann.

The race was not held from 2005 to 2024, before returning in 2025 as the Tour of Holland. It is part of the UCI Europe Tour calendar as a 2.1 category event.

From 2026, Eneco becomes the title sponsor, changing the name to Eneco Tour, and the race were integrated with the women's Simac Ladies Tour, sharing the same routes on the same dates.

== Winners ==
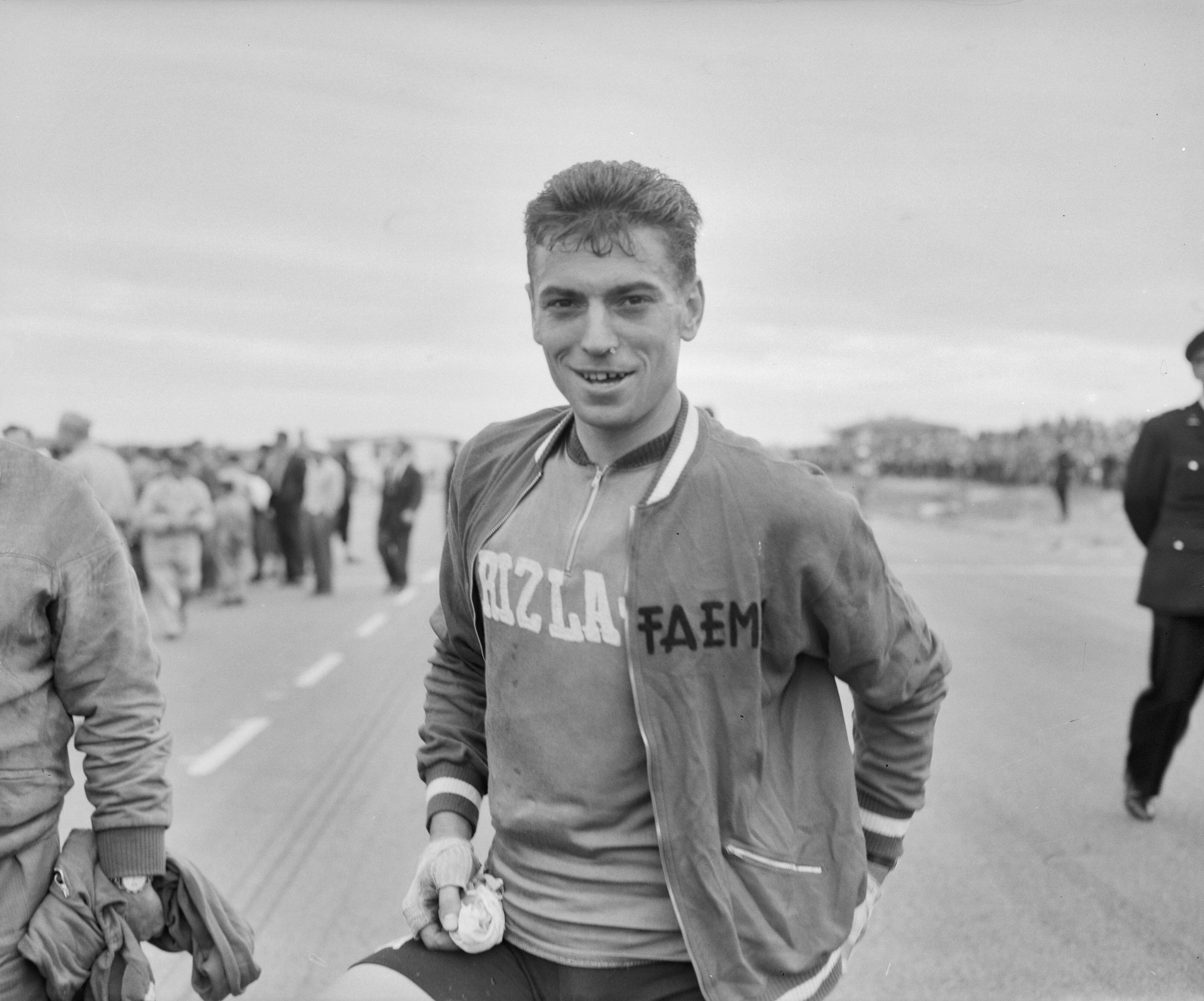
Rik Van Looy on the Zandvoort circuit after winning the 3rd stage of the 1956 Tour of the Netherlands

Year	Winner	Second	Third
1948	(Belgium) Emile Rogiers	(Luxembourg) Jean Goldschmit	(Netherlands) Arie Vooren
1949	(Netherlands) Gerrit Schulte	(Belgium) Désiré Keteleer	(Netherlands) Bouk Schelligerhoudt
1950	(Netherlands) Henk Lakeman	(Belgium) Jules Depoorter	(Belgium) Norbert Callens
1951	(Belgium) Jean Bogaerts	(Belgium) Joseph Van Stayen	(Belgium) Jos De Feyter
1952	(Netherlands) Wim van Est	(Netherlands) Wout Wagtmans	(Netherlands) Gerrit Voorting
1953	No race		
1954	(Netherlands) Wim van Est	(Netherlands) Gerrit Schulte	(Netherlands) Gerrit Voorting
1955	(Netherlands) Piet Haan	(Netherlands) Wim van Est	(Netherlands) Hein van Breenen
1956	(Belgium) Rik Van Looy	(Italy) Guido Carlesi	(Netherlands) Wim van Est
1957	(Belgium) Rik Van Looy	(Netherlands) Wim van Est	(Netherlands) Piet van den Brekel
1958	(Netherlands) Piet van Est	(Netherlands) Peter Post	(Netherlands) Léo van den Brand
1959	No race		
1960	(Netherlands) Peter Post	(Belgium) Roger Baens	(Netherlands) Coen Niesten
1961	(Netherlands) Dick Enthoven	(Netherlands) Huub Zilverberg	(Netherlands) Joop Captein
1962	No race		
1963	(Netherlands) Lex van Kreuningen	(Netherlands) Lambert van de Ven	(Belgium) Théo Nijs
1964	No race		
1965	(Netherlands) Jan Janssen	(Netherlands) Bastian Aliepaard	(Belgium) Jos Huysmans
1966-1974	No races		
1975	(Netherlands) Joop Zoetemelk	(Belgium) Frans Verbeeck	(Netherlands) Gerard Vianen
1976	(Netherlands) Gerrie Knetemann	(Belgium) Ludo Peeters	(Netherlands) Gerard Vianen
1977	(Netherlands) Bert Pronk	(Republic of Ireland) Sean Kelly	(Belgium) Rudy Pevenage
1978	(Netherlands) Johan van der Velde	(Belgium) Etienne Van der Helst	(Belgium) Rudy Pevenage
1979	(Netherlands) Jan Raas	(Netherlands) Gerrie Knetemann	(Belgium) Daniel Willems
1980	(Netherlands) Gerrie Knetemann	(Belgium) Ludo Delcroix	(Belgium) Géry Verlinden
1981	(Netherlands) Gerrie Knetemann	(Netherlands) Hennie Kuiper	(Belgium) René Martens
1982	(Netherlands) Bert Oosterbosch	(Netherlands) Jan Raas	(Netherlands) Gerrie Knetemann
1983	(Netherlands) Adri van Houwelingen	(Netherlands) Johnny Broers	(Belgium) Herman Frison
1984	(Netherlands) Johan Lammerts	(Netherlands) Jos Lammertink	(Netherlands) Gert-Jan Theunisse
1985	(Belgium) Eric Vanderaerden	(Netherlands) Theo De Rooy	(Netherlands) Adri van Houwelingen
1986	(Netherlands) Gerrie Knetemann	(Netherlands) Gerrit Solleveld	(Netherlands) Peter Pieters
1987	(Netherlands) Teun van Vliet	(Belgium) Marc Sergeant	(Netherlands) Adrie van der Poel
1988	(France) Thierry Marie	(Netherlands) Erik Breukink	(Netherlands) Peter Stevenhaagen
1989	(France) Laurent Fignon	(France) Thierry Marie	(Netherlands) Eddy Schurer
1990	(Netherlands) Jelle Nijdam	(Netherlands) Erik Breukink	(France) Thierry Marie
1991	(Netherlands) Frans Maassen	(Germany) Olaf Ludwig	(Netherlands) Eddy Schurer
1992	(Netherlands) Jelle Nijdam	(France) Thierry Marie	(France) Laurent Bezault
1993	(Netherlands) Erik Breukink	(Netherlands) Jelle Nijdam	(Germany) Olaf Ludwig
1994	(Denmark) Jesper Skibby	(Uzbekistan) Djamolidine Abdoujaparov	(Italy) Dario Bottaro
1995	(Netherlands) Jelle Nijdam	(Russia) Vjačeslav Ekimov	(Italy) Flavio Vanzella
1996	(Denmark) Rolf Sørensen	(United States) Lance Armstrong	(Russia) Vjačeslav Ekimov
1997	(Netherlands) Erik Dekker	(Denmark) Peter Meinert Nielsen	(Russia) Vjačeslav Ekimov
1998	(Denmark) Rolf Sørensen	(Russia) Vjačeslav Ekimov	(Belgium) Peter Van Petegem
1999	(Ukraine) Serhiy Honchar	(Netherlands) Erik Dekker	(United States) Dylan Casey
2000	(Netherlands) Erik Dekker	(South Africa) Robbie Hunter	(Netherlands) Servais Knaven
2001	(Netherlands) Léon van Bon	(Netherlands) Erik Dekker	(Ukraine) Serhiy Honchar
2002	(Luxembourg) Kim Kirchen	(Netherlands) Erik Dekker	(Colombia) Víctor Hugo Peña
2003	(Russia) Vjačeslav Ekimov	(Australia) Bradley McGee	(Ukraine) Serhiy Honchar
2004	(Netherlands) Erik Dekker	(Russia) Vjačeslav Ekimov	(Belgium) Marc Wauters
2025	(France) Christophe Laporte	(Slovakia) Lukáš Kubiš	(Sweden) Jakob Söderqvist
2026	(Belgium) Victor Campenaerts	(Netherlands) Wessel Mouris	(New Zealand) Finn Fisher-Black
