= Laurent Bezault =

French cyclist

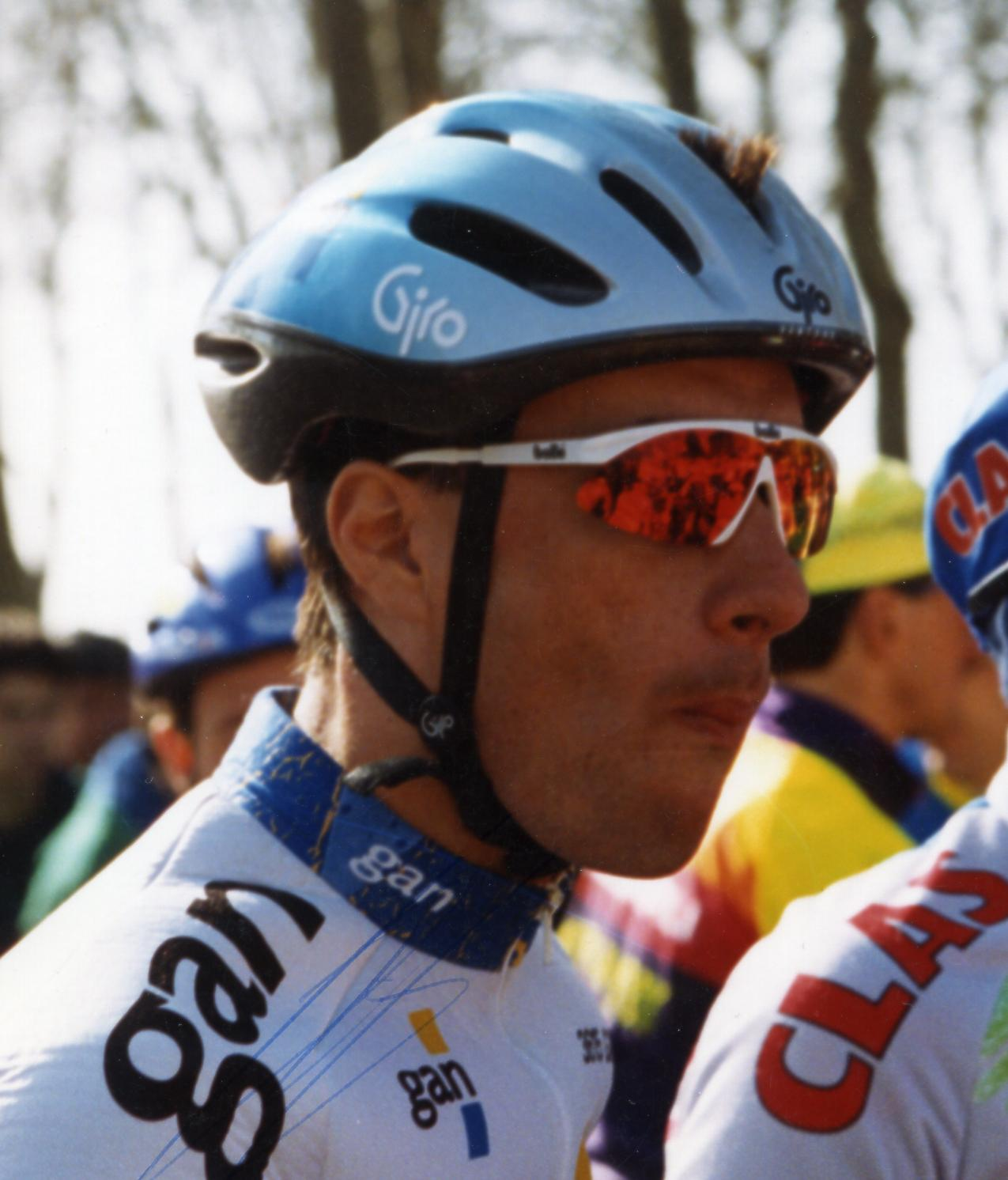
- Bezault at the 1993 Paris–Nice

Personal information
- Born: 8 March 1966 (age 60) Boulogne-Billancourt, France

Cycling career
- Sport: Cycling
- Current team: Retired
- Discipline: Road
- Role: Rider

Professional teams
- 1988–1991: Toshiba–Look
- 1992–1994: Z

Major wins
- One-Day Races and Classics Paris–Troyes (1988)

Laurent Bezault (born 8 March 1966) is a French former racing cyclist. He competed in two events at the 1988 Summer Olympics. He also rode in the 1989 Tour de France.

== Major results ==
1986
2nd Chrono des Herbiers
1987
2nd Overall Tour de la Communauté Européenne

1st Stage 7 (ITT)

9th Overall Circuit Cycliste Sarthe
1988
1st Overall Boucles de la Mayenne
1st Paris–Troyes
1st Paris–Roubaix Espoirs
2nd Coppa Sabatini
4th GP Ouest–France
1989
1st Tour de Vendée
2nd Overall Tour de la Communauté Européenne
5th Overall Critérium du Dauphiné Libéré
5th Overall La Méditerranéenne
5th Overall Critérium International
1991
1st Overall Cronostaffetta (TTT)
1992
2nd Overall Tour du Poitou Charentes et de la Vienne
3rd Overall Ronde van Nederland
3rd Overall Vuelta a Aragón
3rd Tour de Vendée
4th Milano–Torino
8th GP Eddy Merckx
1993
1st Stage 4 Tour du Limousin
2nd Overall Paris–Nice
2nd Overall Circuit Cycliste Sarthe
3rd Firenze–Pistoia
3rd Paris–Camembert
4th Trophée des Grimpeurs
