= Marco Lietti =

Italian cyclist

Personal information
- Full name: Marco Lietti
- Born: 20 April 1965 (age 61) Gravedona, Italy

Cycling career
- Sport: Cycling
- Discipline: Road
- Role: Rider

Professional teams
- 1988–1989: Malvor–Bottecchia–Sidi
- 1990–1992: Ariostea
- 1993–1994: Lampre–Polti
- 1995–1996: MG Maglificio–Technogym
- 1997: Refin–Mobilvetta

Major wins
- 1 stage 1991 Tour de France

Marco Lietti (born 20 April 1965, in Gravedona) is an Italian former road cyclist, who was a professional rider from 1988 to 1997. He only rode for Italian teams.

== Major results ==
1986
1st Coppa Collecchio
1988
3rd Gran Piemonte
9th Firenze–Pistoia
1990
1st Stage 6 Volta a Catalunya
2nd Giro di Toscana
2nd Giro dell'Appennino
4th Giro del Friuli
9th GP des Amériques
1991
1st Stage 16 Tour de France
3rd Overall Giro di Puglia
1992
2nd Trofeo Matteotti
2nd Giro del Friuli
3rd G.P. Camaiore
8th Overall Ronde van Nederland
1994
2nd Overall Tour de Pologne

1st Stage 1

5th Coppa Bernocchi
1995
1st Tour du Haut Var
1996
4th Overall Ronde van Nederland
7th GP Ouest-France
1997
3rd Coppa Bernocchi
