= 2001 Vuelta a Andalucía =

Race details
- Dates: 18–22 February 2001
- Stages: 5
- Distance: 857.1 km (532.6 mi)
- Winning time: 22h 09' 32"

Results
| | Winner | Erik Dekker (NED) |
| | Second | Marc Wauters (BEL) |
| | Third | Alexandr Shefer (KAZ) |

The 2001 Vuelta a Andalucía was the 47th edition of the Vuelta a Andalucía (Ruta del Sol) cycle race and was held on 18 February to 22 February 2001. The race started in Córdoba and finished in Granada. The race was won by Erik Dekker.

== Teams ==
Seventeen teams of up to eight riders started the race:

- ONCE–Eroski
- iBanesto.com
- Lotto–Adecco
- Euskaltel–Euskadi
- Mercury–Viatel
- Rabobank
- Team Telekom
- Domo–Farm Frites–Latexco
- Team Coast–Buffalo
- Colchon Relax–Fuenlabrada
- U.S. Postal Service
- Nürnberger
- Collstrop–Palmans
- Jazztel–Costa de Almería
- Festina
- Alessio
- Mapei–Quick-Step

== General classification ==
Final general classification

| Rank | Rider | Time |
|---|---|---|
| 1 | Erik Dekker (NED) | 22h 09' 32" |
| 2 | Marc Wauters (BEL) | + 6" |
| 3 | Alexandr Shefer (KAZ) | + 9" |
| 4 | Andrei Tchmil (BEL) | + 12" |
| 5 | Jan Schaffrath (GER) | + 21" |
| 6 | Gennady Mikhaylov (RUS) | + 1' 12" |
| 7 | Pietro Caucchioli (ITA) | + 2' 05" |
| 8 | Félix Manuel García (ESP) | + 2' 11" |
| 9 | Wilfried Peeters (BEL) | + 2' 18" |
| 10 | Johan Museeuw (BEL) | + 2' 23" |
