= Frank Corvers =

Belgian cyclist

Personal information
- Born: 12 November 1969 (age 56) Koersel, Beringen, Belgium

Cycling career
- Sport: Cycling
- Current team: Retired
- Discipline: Road
- Role: Rider

Amateur team
- 1989: TVM–Ragno

Professional teams
- 1992–1994: Collstrop–Garden Wood
- 1995–1996: Lotto–Isoglass
- 1997: Team Telekom
- 1998: Palmans–Ideal
- 1999: Spar–RDM
- 2000: Memory Card–Jack & Jones
- 2001–2002: Ville de Charleroi–New Systems

Frank Corvers (born 12 November 1969) is a Belgian former professional road cyclist.

== Major results ==
1992
1st Internationale Wielertrofee Jong Maar Moedig
1993
5th Grote Prijs Jef Scherens
1994
3rd Ronde van Limburg
10th Tour of Flanders
1995
1st Grand Prix d'Isbergues
1st Brussels–Ingooigem
2nd Grote Prijs Jef Scherens
2nd Paris–Brussels
1996
3rd Grand Prix de Wallonie
8th Overall 4 Jours de Dunkerque
1997
3rd Madsion, European Track Championships (with Etienne De Wilde)
3rd Flèche Ardennaise
1999
1st Grote 1-MeiPrijs
2000
3rd Six Days of Ghent (with Adriano Baffi)
