= Rik Reinerink =

Dutch cyclist

Personal information
- Born: 21 May 1973 (age 53) Harbrinkhoek, Netherlands

Cycling career
- Sport: Cycling
- Current team: Retired
- Discipline: Road
- Role: Rider

Amateur teams
- 1996: Giant–Löwik
- 1996: Rabobank (stagiaire)
- 1997: Topteam Tegeltoko

Professional teams
- 1999–2003: Batavus–Bankgiroloterij
- 2004: Chocolade Jacques–Wincor Nixdorf
- 2005–2006: Shimano–Memory Corp

Rik Reinerink (born 21 May 1973) is a Dutch former road cyclist, who competed as a professional from 1999 to 2006.

== Major results ==
1991
3rd Overall Giro della Lunigiana
3rd Trofeo Emilio Paganessi
4th Road race, UCI Junior Road World Championships
1992
1st Stage 1 Tour of Austria
1994
2nd Ronde van Drenthe
3rd Ronde van Limburg
1995
3rd Road race, National Under-23 Road Championships
1996
1st Round van Zuid-Holland
1st Stage 10 Olympia's Tour
1997
10th Overall Circuit Franco-Belge
1999
1st Ster van Zwolle
3rd Ronde van Overijssel
7th Prix d'Armor, Mi-Août en Bretagne
9th Overall Olympia's Tour

1st Stage 2

9th Ronde van Drenthe
2000
2nd Ster van Zwolle
2001
5th Brussels–Ingooigem
2002
1st Stage 6 Ster Elektrotoer
3rd GP Aarhus
4th Ronde van Drenthe
4th Le Samyn
2003
1st Stage 5 Ronde van Nederland
3rd Overall Ster Elektrotoer

1st Mountains classification

3rd GP Stad Vilvoorde
4th Overall Circuit Franco-Belge
4th Tour Beneden-Maas
6th Ronde van Noord-Holland
6th Omloop van de Vlaamse Scheldeboorden
9th GP Aarhus
2004
1st Noord-Nederland Tour (with 21 others)
5th Classic Haribo
7th Paris–Brussels
7th Omloop van het Waasland
9th Nationale Sluitingprijs
2005
3rd Tour de Rijke
5th Ronde van Midden-Zeeland
8th GP Stad Zottegem
10th Nationale Sluitingprijs
2006
2nd GP Herning
