= 1995 Tour du Haut Var =

Race details
- Dates: 18 February 1995
- Stages: 1
- Distance: 200 km (124.3 mi)
- Winning time: 5h 33' 46"

Results
	Winner	Marco Lietti (ITA)
	Second	Luca Scinto (ITA)
	Third	Giuseppe Guerini (ITA)

The 1995 Tour du Haut Var was the 27th edition of the Tour du Haut Var cycle race and was held on 18 February 1995. The race started and finished in Draguignan. The race was won by Marco Lietti.

== General classification ==
Final general classification

Rank	Rider	Time
1	Marco Lietti (ITA)	5h 33' 46"
2	Luca Scinto (ITA)	+ 0"
3	Giuseppe Guerini (ITA)	+ 58"
4	Yvon Ledanois (FRA)	+ 1' 22"
5	Jens Zemke (GER)	+ 1' 36"
6	Peter Van Petegem (BEL)	+ 3' 11"
7	Thierry Gouvenou (FRA)	+ 3' 11"
8	Richard Virenque (FRA)	+ 3' 11"
9	Luc Roosen (BEL)	+ 3' 11"
10	Fausto Dotti (ITA)	+ 3' 11"
