= 1995 Grote Prijs Jef Scherens =

Race details
- Dates: 3 September 1995
- Stages: 1
- Distance: 187 km (116.2 mi)
- Winning time: 4h 38' 00"

Results
	Winner	Erik Dekker (NED)
	Second	Frank Corvers (BEL)
	Third	Léon van Bon (NED)

The 1995 Grote Prijs Jef Scherens was the 29th edition of the Grote Prijs Jef Scherens cycle race and was held on 3 September 1995. The race started and finished in Leuven. The race was won by Erik Dekker.

== General classification ==
Final general classification

Rank	Rider	Time
1	Erik Dekker (NED)	4h 38' 00"
2	Frank Corvers (BEL)	+ 0"
3	Léon van Bon (NED)	+ 0"
4	Scott Sunderland (AUS)	+ 0"
5	Marc Wauters (BEL)	+ 6"
6	Nico Renders (BEL)	+ 11"
7	Johan Capiot (BEL)	+ 11"
8	Danny Daelman (BEL)	+ 11"
9	Jean-Pierre Heynderickx (BEL)	+ 11"
10	Tom Steels (BEL)	+ 11"
