= 1989 Ronde van Nederland =

Dutch cycling race

These are the results for the 29th edition of the Ronde van Nederland cycling race, which was held from August 14 to August 19, 1989. The race started in Nieuwegein (Utrecht) and finished 857 kilometres later in Gulpen (Limburg).

== Stages ==
=== 14-08-1989: Nieuwegein-Nieuwegein (Prologue), 5 km ===
RANK	NAME CYCLIST	TEAM	TIME
1.	Sean Yates (GBR)	7-Eleven	00:05:42
2.	Jelle Nijdam (NED)	Superconfex–Yoko–Opel–Colnago	+ 0.01
3.	Thierry Marie (FRA)	Super U–Raleigh–Fiat	+ 0.05

=== 15-08-1989: Nieuwegein-Dordrecht, 167 km ===
RANK	NAME CYCLIST	TEAM	TIME
1.	Jelle Nijdam (NED)	Superconfex–Yoko–Opel–Colnago	04:14:11
2.	Peter Pieters (NED)	TVM–Ragno	—
3.	Wiebren Veenstra (NED)	Hitachi	—

=== 16-08-1989: Dordrecht-Huizen, 92 km ===
RANK	NAME CYCLIST	TEAM	TIME
1.	Jean-Paul van Poppel (NED)	Panasonic–Isostar–Colnago–Agu	01:57:24
2.	Eric Vanderaerden (BEL)	Panasonic–Isostar–Colnago–Agu	—
3.	Mathieu Hermans (NED)	Paternina	—

=== 16-08-1989: Hilversum-Huizen (Time Trial), 15 km ===
RANK	NAME CYCLIST	TEAM	TIME
1.	Thierry Marie (FRA)	Super U–Raleigh–Fiat	00:20:25
2.	Sean Yates (GBR)	7-Eleven	+ 0.10
3.	Gerrit Solleveld (NED)	Superconfex–Yoko–Opel–Colnago	—

=== 17-08-1989: Huizen-Raalte, 204 km ===
RANK	NAME CYCLIST	TEAM	TIME
1.	Jean-Paul van Poppel (NED)	Panasonic–Isostar–Colnago–Agu	05:07:08
2.	Jelle Nijdam (NED)	Superconfex–Yoko–Opel–Colnago	—
3.	Eric Vanderaerden (BEL)	Panasonic–Isostar–Colnago–Agu	—

=== 18-08-1989: Raalte-Eindhoven, 196 km ===
RANK	NAME CYCLIST	TEAM	TIME
1.	Eric Vanderaerden (BEL)	Panasonic–Isostar–Colnago–Agu	05:12:40
2.	Jean-Paul van Poppel (NED)	Panasonic–Isostar–Colnago–Agu	—
3.	Jelle Nijdam (NED)	Superconfex–Yoko–Opel–Colnago	—

=== 19-08-1989: Geleen-Gulpen, 178 km ===
RANK	NAME CYCLIST	TEAM	TIME
1.	Theo de Rooij (NED)	Panasonic–Isostar–Colnago–Agu	04:14:24
2.	Laurent Fignon (FRA)	Super U–Raleigh–Fiat	—
3.	Maarten Ducrot (NED)	Domex–Weinmann	+ 0.13

== Final classification ==
RANK	NAME CYCLIST	TEAM	TIME
1.	Laurent Fignon (FRA)	Super U–Raleigh–Fiat	21:13:13
2.	Thierry Marie (FRA)	Super U–Raleigh–Fiat	+ 0.01
3.	Eddy Schurer (NED)	TVM–Ragno	+ 0.04
4.	Sean Kelly (IRL)	PDM–Ultima–Concorde	+ 0.11
5.	Maarten Ducrot (NED)	Domex–Weinmann	+ 0.25
6.	Theo de Rooij (NED)	Panasonic–Isostar–Colnago–Agu	+ 0.30
7.	Eric Vanderaerden (BEL)	Panasonic–Isostar–Colnago–Agu	+ 0.44
8.	René Beuker (NED)	Paternina	+ 1.01
9.	Teun van Vliet (NED)	Panasonic–Isostar–Colnago–Agu	+ 1.32
10.	Rudy Dhaenens (BEL)	PDM–Ultima–Concorde	+ 1.40
