= 2000 Ronde van Nederland =

Dutch cycling race

These are the results for the 40th edition of the Ronde van Nederland cycling race, which was held from August 21 to August 26, 2000. The race started in Den Bosch and finished in Landgraaf.

== Final classification ==
RANK	NAME CYCLIST	TEAM	TIME
1.	Erik Dekker (NED)	Rabobank	20:36:32
2.	Robert Hunter (RSA)	Lampre–Daikin	+ 0.13
3.	Servais Knaven (NED)	Farm Frites	+ 0.18
4.	Tyler Hamilton (USA)	U.S. Postal Service	+ 0.22
5.	Fabrizio Guidi (ITA)	Française des Jeux	+ 0.24
6.	Romāns Vainšteins (LAT)	Vini Caldirola–Sidermec	—
7.	Raivis Belohvoščiks (LAT)	Lampre–Daikin	+ 0.30
8.	Marc Wauters (BEL)	Rabobank	+ 0.32
9.	Marco Pinotti (ITA)	Lampre–Daikin	+ 0.43
10.	Peter Van Petegem (BEL)	Farm Frites	+ 0.54
