= 2003 Ronde van Nederland =

Le Tour De Holland 2003

These are the results for the 43rd edition of the Ronde van Nederland cycling race, which was held from August 19 to August 23, 2003. The race started in Middelburg and finished in Landgraaf.

== Stages ==
=== 19-08-2003: Middelburg-Rotterdam, 180 km ===
RANK	FIRST STAGE	TEAM	TIME
1.	Alessandro Petacchi (ITA)	Fassa Bortolo	04:09.41
2.	Erik Zabel (GER)	Team Telekom	—
3.	Robbie McEwen (AUS)	Lotto-Domo	—

=== 20-08-2003: Apeldoorn-Nijkerk, 190 km ===
RANK	SECOND STAGE	TEAM	TIME
1.	Alessandro Petacchi (ITA)	Fassa Bortolo	04:20.01
2.	Erik Zabel (GER)	Team Telekom	—
3.	Marco Zanotti (ITA)	Fassa Bortolo	—

=== 21-08-2003: Coevorden-Denekamp, 86 km ===
RANK	THIRD STAGE	TEAM	TIME
1.	Erik Zabel (GER)	Team Telekom	01:52:02
2.	Robbie McEwen (AUS)	Lotto-Domo	—
3.	Bradley McGee (AUS)	FDJeux.com	—

=== 21-08-2003: Nordhorn-Denekamp, 23 km ===
RANK	FOURTH STAGE - TIME TRIAL	TEAM	TIME
1.	Viatcheslav Ekimov (RUS)	US Postal Service	00:27:25
2.	Víctor Hugo Peña (COL)	US Postal Service	+ 0.08
3.	Fabian Cancellara (SUI)	Fassa Bortolo	+ 0.09

=== 22-08-2003: Kleve-Sittard, 195 km ===
RANK	FIFTH STAGE	TEAM	TIME
1.	Rik Reinerink (NED)	BankGiroloterij	04:33:10
2.	Alessandro Petacchi (ITA)	Fassa Bortolo	+ 0.11
3.	Erik Zabel (GER)	Team Telekom	—

=== 23-08-2003: Sittard/Geleen-Landgraaf, 215 km ===
RANK	SIXTH STAGE	TEAM	TIME
1.	Bradley McGee (AUS)	FDJeux.com	05:19:20
2.	Óscar Freire (ESP)	Rabobank	—
3.	Xavier Florencio (ESP)	O.N.C.E.-Eroski	—

== Final classification ==
RANK	NAME CYCLIST	TEAM	TIME
1.	Viatcheslav Ekimov (RUS)	US Postal Service	20:41:48
2.	Bradley McGee (AUS)	FDJeux.com	+ 0.25
3.	Sergei Honchar (UKR)	De Nardi-Colpack	+ 0.34
4.	Fabian Cancellara (SUI)	Fassa Bortolo	+ 0.37
5.	Xavier Florencio (ESP)	O.N.C.E.-Eroski	+ 0.44
6.	Marc Wauters (BEL)	Rabobank	+ 0.47
7.	Michael Boogerd (NED)	Rabobank	+ 1.03
8.	Óscar Freire (ESP)	Rabobank	+ 1.11
9.	Bart Voskamp (NED)	BankGiroloterij	+ 1.17
10.	Víctor Hugo Peña (COL)	US Postal Service	+ 1.23
