= Erik Dekker =

Dutch cyclist (born 1970)

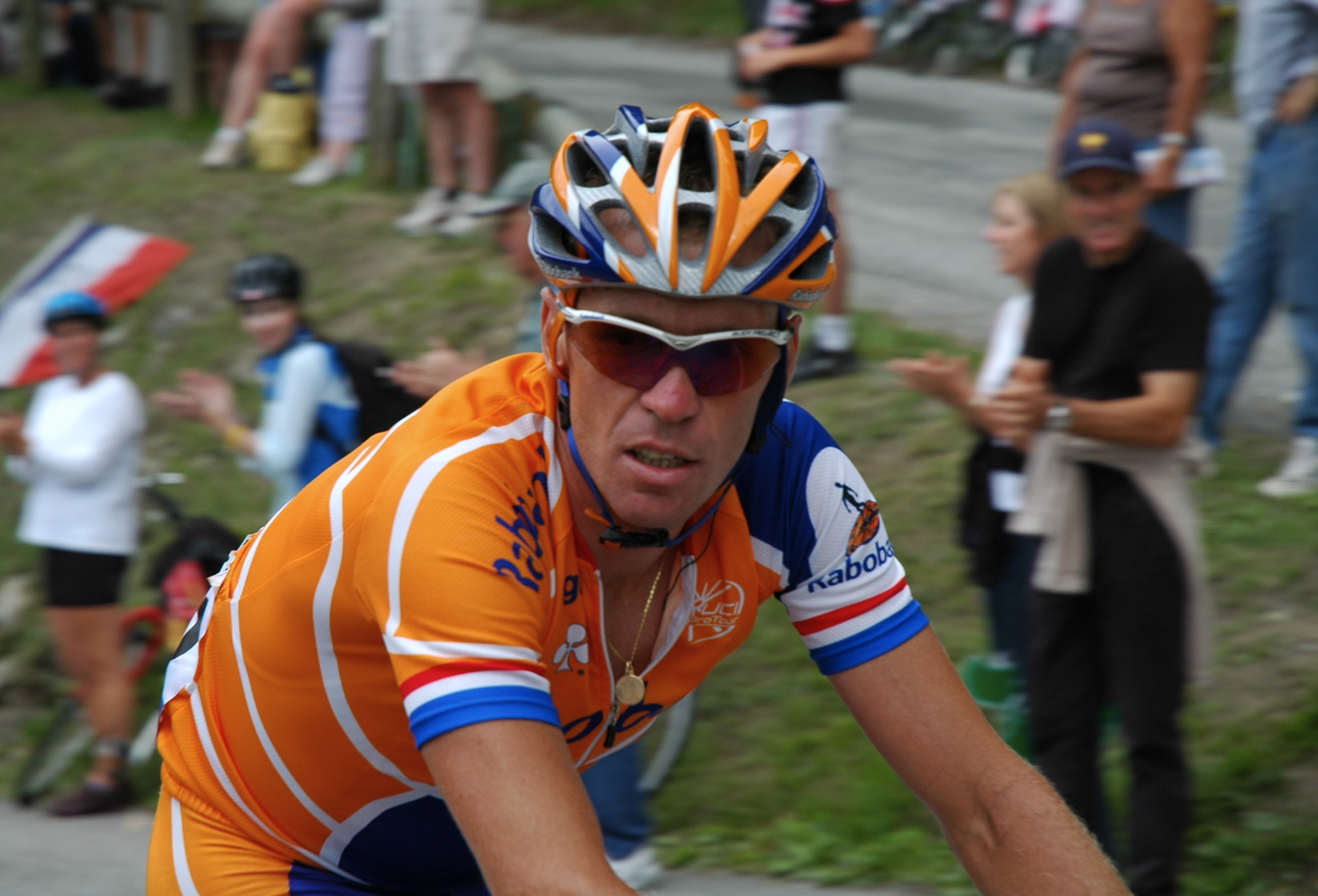
- Dekker at the 2005 Tour de France

Personal information
- Full name: Hendrik Dekker
- Born: 21 August 1970 (age 56) Hoogeveen, Drenthe, Netherlands
- Height: 1.82 m (5 ft 11 1/2 in)
- Weight: 66 kg (146 lb; 10 st 6 lb)

Cycling career
- Sport: Cycling
- Current team: Rabobank
- Discipline: Road
- Role: Directeur sportif
- Rider type: Classics specialist

Professional team
- 1992–2006: Buckler–Colnago–Decca

Managerial team
- 2007–2015: Rabobank

Major wins
- Grand Tours Tour de France 4 individual stages Stage Races Tirreno–Adriatico (2002) Ronde van Nederland (1997, 2000, 2004) Single-Day Races and Classics Dutch Road Race Championship (2004) Dutch Time Trial Championship (1996, 2000, 2002) Amstel Gold Race (2001) Clásica de San Sebastián (2000) Paris–Tours (2004) Other UCI Road World Cup (2001)
Medal record
Men's road bicycle racing
Representing the Netherlands
Olympic Games
Silver medal – second place	1992 Barcelona	Individual Road Race

Hendrik "Erik" Dekker (born 21 August 1970) is a retired Dutch professional road racing cyclist active from 1992 until 2006. He was a member of the Rabobank cycling team from 1992 till 2006. From 2007 to 2015 he was one of Rabobank's team managers.

== Cycling career ==
=== Amateur career ===
Dekker rode his first race at eight, and soon became successful. In 1985 he was invited to join the national selection for juniors. As an amateur, his most important results were second places at the youth world championships in Bergamo in 1987 and at the road race in the 1992 Summer Olympics. In that Olympic road race, Dekker got away at 30 km before the finish, together with Fabio Casartelli and Dainis Ozols. Dekker was outsprinted by Casartelli, but was so happy that he won a medal that he also finished with his arms in the air.

Directly after the Olympic Games, he became professional, and rode his first race a few weeks later in the Tour de l'Avenir.

=== Professional career ===
His first win as a professional was a stage of the Tour of the Basque Country of 1994, the year he rode his first Tour de France. In 1997 Dekker won the Ronde van Nederland, but a large part of 1998 was lost because of injuries.

The year 2000 was Dekker's best. He won three stages in the 2000 Tour de France, although neither a sprinter nor a favourite for the overall win, and was voted most combative cyclist. In the autumn of that year, Dekker won his first classic, the Clásica de San Sebastián.

In 2001 Dekker won the Amstel Gold Race and the UCI Road World Cup. In the 2001 Tour de France he took a stage, after having helped his teammate Marc Wauters to a stage win. At the end of the year he was named Dutch Sportsman of the year.

The years 2002 and 2003 were less successful because of injuries. He came back in 2004 in the spring classics and a victory in Paris–Tours. He had announced his retirement for the autumn of 2006, but he crashed heavily in the 2006 Tour de France and decided to stop.

=== Managing career ===
In 2007, Dekker started as team manager of the Rabobank team. At the end of the 2015 season, he left the team.

== Major results ==
1991
2nd Overall Olympia's Tour

1st Stage 5b (ITT)

3rd Ronde van Overijssel
7th Overall Tour of Sweden
1992
Tour de l'Avenir

1st Stages 8 & 10

2nd Road race, Olympic Games
3rd Overall GP Tell

1st Prologue

8th Milano–Torino
10th GP des Amériques
1994
1st Overall Tour of Sweden

1st Prologue & Stage 6b (ITT)

1st Stage 1 Tour of the Basque Country
7th Overall Tour de Luxembourg
1995
1st Overall Tour of Sweden

1st Prologue & Stage 3a (ITT)

1st Grote Prijs Jef Scherens
1st Rund um Köln
6th Overall Tour de Luxembourg
1996
National Road Championships

1st Time trial
3rd Road race

1st Seraing-Aachen-Seraing
5th Overall Ronde van Nederland
6th Overall Regio-Tour

1st Prologue

10th Grand Prix des Nations
1997
1st Overall Ronde van Nederland

1st Stage 3b (ITT)

2nd Time trial, National Road Championships
7th Overall Route du Sud
10th GP Rik Van Steenbergen
1998
2nd Overall Tour de Luxembourg
10th Time trial, UCI Road World Championships
1999
1st Grand Prix Eddy Merckx (with Marc Wauters)
2nd Overall Rheinland-Pfalz Rundfahrt

1st Stages 2b (ITT) & 6

2nd Overall Ronde van Nederland
2nd Time trial, National Road Championships
2nd Trofeo Calvià
3rd Veenendaal–Veenendaal
7th Overall KBC Driedaagse van De Panne-Koksijde
7th Clásica de San Sebastián
7th HEW Cyclassics
8th Time trial, UCI Road World Championships
9th Overall Vuelta a Andalucía
10th Coppa Sabatini
2000
1st Overall Ronde van Nederland

1st Prologue

Tour de France

1st Stages 8, 11 & 17
Combativity award Overall

1st Clásica de San Sebastián
1st Josef Voegeli Memorial
National Road Championships

1st Time trial
3rd Road race

2nd Overall Tour of Sweden

1st Prologue & Stage 3

3rd Grand Prix Eddy Merckx (with Marc Wauters)
4th Le Samyn
7th Clásica de Almería
2001
1st UCI Road World Cup
1st Amstel Gold Race
1st Grand Prix Eddy Merckx (with Marc Wauters)
1st Overall Guldensporentweedaagse

1st Stage 1

1st Overall Rheinland-Pfalz Rundfahrt

1st Stage 2

1st Overall Vuelta a Andalucía
1st Stage 8 Tour de France
2nd Tour of Flanders
2nd Overall Ronde van Nederland

1st Stage 6

2nd Overall KBC Driedaagse van De Panne-Koksijde
3rd HEW Cyclassics
4th Road race, UCI Road World Championships
5th Züri-Metzgete
5th Rund um Köln
8th Liège–Bastogne–Liège
9th Clásica de San Sebastián
2002
1st Overall Tirreno–Adriatico

1st Stage 4 (ITT)

1st Overall Guldensporentweedaagse

1st Stage 3

1st Time trial, National Road Championships
1st Trofeo Calvià
2nd Overall Ronde van Nederland
3rd Grand Prix Eddy Merckx (with Marc Wauters)
6th Overall Vuelta a Andalucía

1st Stage 5

6th Overall Volta a la Comunitat Valenciana
2003
1st Overall Grote Prijs Erik Breukink
2nd Tour Beneden-Maas
2004
1st Overall Ronde van Nederland

1st Stage 6

1st Road race, National Road Championships
1st Paris–Tours
1st Ronde van Drenthe
1st Noord-Nederland Tour
5th Tour of Flanders
5th Liège–Bastogne–Liège
7th Amstel Gold Race
8th Overall Vuelta a Andalucía
2005
2nd Overall Eneco Tour
2nd Time trial, National Road Championships
7th E3 Prijs Vlaanderen
2006
1st Stage 2 Ster Elektrotoer (ITT)
1st Egmond-pier-Egmond
2nd Overall Critérium International

1st Stage 1

National Road Championships

2nd Time trial
6th Road race

7th Overall Paris–Nice

== See also ==
- List of Dutch Olympic cyclists

Sporting positions
Preceded by Rolf Sørensen; Serhiy Honchar; Viatcheslav Ekimov	Winner of the Ronde van Nederland; 1997; 2000; 2004	Succeeded by Rolf Sørensen; Léon van Bon; Final winner
Preceded by Erik Zabel	Winner of the Amstel Gold Race; 2001	Succeeded by Michele Bartoli
Preceded by Rudie Kemna	Dutch National Road Race Champion; 2004	Succeeded by Léon van Bon
Awards
Preceded by Pieter van den Hoogenband	Dutch Sportsman of the Year; 2001	Succeeded by Jochem Uytdehaage
