= 1993 Paris–Nice =

Race details
- Dates: 7–14 March 1993
- Stages: 7 + Prologue
- Distance: 1,117.5 km (694.4 mi)
- Winning time: 29h 07' 45"

Results
Jersey awarded to the overall winner	Winner	Alex Zülle (SUI)	(ONCE)
	Second	Laurent Bezault (FRA)	(GAN)
	Third	Pascal Lance (FRA)	(GAN)

The 1993 Paris–Nice was the 51st edition of the Paris–Nice cycle race and was held from 7 March to 14 March 1993. The race started in Fontenay-sous-Bois and finished at the Col d'Èze. The race was won by Alex Zülle of the ONCE team.

== Route ==
Stage characteristics and winners
Stage	Date	Course	Distance	Type	Winner
1	7 March	Fontenay-sous-Bois	7.7 km (4.8 mi)	Individual time trial	Alex Zülle (SUI)
2	8 March	Meung-sur-Loire to Nevers	208.5 km (129.6 mi)		Mario Cipollini (ITA)
3	9 March	Roanne	33 km (21 mi)	Team time trial	ONCE
4	10 March	Roanne to Saint-Étienne	153 km (95 mi)		Johan Museeuw (BEL)
5	11 March	Saint-Étienne to Vaison-la-Romaine	210 km (130 mi)		Mario Cipollini (ITA)
6	12 March	Sarrians to Marseille	192 km (119 mi)		Mario Cipollini (ITA)
7	13 March	Marseille to Mandelieu-la-Napoule	196.5 km (122.1 mi)		Armand de Las Cuevas (FRA)
8a	14 March	Mandelieu-la-Napoule to Nice	104.3 km (64.8 mi)		Laurent Jalabert (FRA)
8b	14 March	Nice to Col d'Èze	12.5 km (7.8 mi)	Individual time trial	Alex Zülle (SUI)

== General classification ==
Final general classification

Rank	Rider	Team	Time
1	Alex Zülle (SUI)	ONCE	29h 07' 45"
2	Laurent Bezault (FRA)	GAN	+ 41"
3	Pascal Lance (FRA)	GAN	+ 1' 07"
4	Armand de Las Cuevas (FRA)	Banesto	+ 1' 44"
5	Erik Breukink (NED)	ONCE	+ 1' 55"
6	Laurent Brochard (FRA)	Castorama	+ 2' 25"
7	Andrew Hampsten (USA)	Motorola	+ 2' 27"
8	Tony Rominger (SUI)	CLAS–Cajastur	+ 2' 32"
9	Lance Armstrong (USA)	Motorola	+ 2' 45"
10	Stéphane Heulot (FRA)	Banesto	+ 2' 54"
