= Danny Daelman =

Belgian cyclist (born 1969)

Personal information
- Born: 23 October 1969 (age 56) Sint-Niklaas, Belgium

Cycling career
- Sport: Cycling
- Current team: Retired
- Discipline: Road
- Role: Rider

Professional teams
- 1991: Buckler–Colnago–Decca (stagiaire)
- 1992: Buckler–Colnago–Decca (stagiaire)
- 1993–1994: WordPerfect–Colnago–Decca
- 1995: Rotan Spiessens–Hot Dog Louis
- 1996–1999: Collstrop–Lystex
- 2000: Spar–OKI–Daewoo
- 2001: Zetelhallen–Aluplast
- 2001–2003: Collstrop–Palmans

Danny Daelman (born 23 October 1969) is a Belgian former racing cyclist, who competed as a professional from 1993 to 2003.

== Major results ==
1988
1st Omloop der Vlaamse Gewesten
1990
8th Overall Circuit Franco-Belge
1991
1st Stage 1 GP Tell
5th Schaal Sels
1992
1st Stage 6b Giro delle Regioni
2nd Schaal Sels
7th Kampioenschap van Vlaanderen
1993
1st Omloop van de Westhoek
1st Omloop van het Houtland
4th Overall Etoile de Bessèges
7th Milano–Torino
9th Kampioenschap van Vlaanderen
1994
5th GP Stad Zottegem
7th GP Rik Van Steenbergen
1995
4th Omloop van de Vlaamse Scheldeboorden
5th Le Samyn
8th Grote Prijs Jef Scherens
9th GP Stad Zottegem
1996
1st Grote Prijs Marcel Kint
3rd GP Rik Van Steenbergen
1997
4th Scheldeprijs
7th Trofeo Luis Puig
1998
5th Road race, National Road Championships
6th Kampioenschap van Vlaanderen
7th Grand Prix de la Ville de Lillers
9th Omloop van de Westhoek
1999
3rd Omloop van de Vlaamse Scheldeboorden
7th Halle–Ingooigem
8th Kampioenschap van Vlaanderen
9th Dwars door Gendringen
9th GP Rik Van Steenbergen
2000
1st Stage 3 Olympia's Tour
7th Omloop van het Waasland
2001
2nd Ster van Zwolle
2nd Grote 1-MeiPrijs
6th Halle–Ingooigem
2002
1st Halle–Ingooigem
6th ZLM Tour
8th Tour Beneden-Maas
9th Grote 1-MeiPrijs
2003
9th GP Rudy Dhaenens
10th Nokere Koerse
