= 2002 Ronde van Nederland =

Dutch cycling race

- Forty-second edition of the Ronde van Nederland

Details
- Dates: 20 - 24 August
- Location: Utrecht to Landgraaf
- Races: 6

Champions
- Individual champion: (Luxembourg) Kim Kirchen

These are the results for the 42nd edition of the Ronde van Nederland cycling race, which was held from 20 to 24 August 2002. The race started in Utrecht and finished in Landgraaf.

== Final classification ==
RANK	NAME CYCLIST	TEAM	TIME
1.	Kim Kirchen (LUX)	Fassa Bortolo	19:53:04
2.	Erik Dekker (NED)	Rabobank	+ 0.04
3.	Víctor Hugo Peña (COL)	US Postal Service	+ 0.14
4.	David Canada (ESP)	Mapei-Quick Step	+ 0.17
5.	Robert Bartko (GER)	Deutsche Telekom	+ 0.19
6.	Marc Wauters (BEL)	Rabobank	+ 0.20
7.	Serguei Ivanov (RUS)	Fassa Bortolo	—
8.	Kurt Asle Arvesen (NOR)	EDS-fakta	+ 0.30
9.	Dylan Casey (USA)	US Postal Service	+ 0.33
10.	Tyler Hamilton (USA)	CSC-Tiscali	+ 0.36
