= Grand Prix Eddy Merckx =

Belgian cycling race

Grand Prix/Grote Prijs Eddy Merckx
- Poster to the 1993 edition

Race details
- Date: Late-August
- Region: Brussels, Belgium
- English name: Grand Prize Eddy Merckx
- Local name(s): Grand Prix Eddy Merckx (in French), Grote Prijs Eddy Merckx (in Dutch)
- Discipline: Road race
- Type: Individual Time Trial; Team Time Trial

History
- First edition: 1980
- Editions: 25
- Final edition: 2004
- First winner: (Norway) Knut Knudsen
- Most wins: (Norway) Knut Knudsen (Belgium) Eric Vanderaerden (United Kingdom) Chris Boardman (Spain) Abraham Olano (Belgium) Marc Wauters (Netherlands) Erik Dekker (2 wins)
- Final winner: (Netherlands) Thomas Dekker (Netherlands) Koen de Kort

Grand Prix Eddy Merckx was a cycle race around Brussels, where Eddy Merckx was born. It was held between 1980 and 2004, disappearing after the creation of the UCI ProTour in 2005. The race was initially an individual time trial, becoming a Team time trial of two riders in 1998. It usually had a duration of 60-70 km, with the 2003 being the shortest at 26 km because of a nearby fire.

With the introduction of the UCI ProTour in 2005, there were plans to merge the race with Paris–Brussels. This merger was eventually never completed, by which the race disappeared from the calendar.

== Winners ==
Year	Country	Rider	Team
1980	Norway	Knut Knudsen	
1981	Norway	Knut Knudsen	
1982	Belgium	Daniel Willems	
1983	Belgium	Jean-Luc Vandenbroucke	
1984	Belgium	Claude Criquielion	
1985	Belgium	Eric Vanderaerden	
1986	France	Charly Mottet	
1987	Belgium	Eric Vanderaerden	
1988	Belgium	Edwig Van Hooydonck	
1989	Great Britain	Sean Yates	
1990	Netherlands	Frans Maassen	
1991	Netherlands	Erik Breukink	
1992	Netherlands	Jelle Nijdam	
1993	Great Britain	Chris Boardman	
1994	Switzerland	Tony Rominger	
1995	Belgium	Johan Museeuw	
1996	Great Britain	Chris Boardman	
1997	Spain	Abraham Olano	
1998	Spain	Abraham Olano (victory shared with José Vicente García)	
1998	Spain	José Vicente García (victory shared with Abraham Olano)	
1999	Belgium	Marc Wauters (victory shared with Erik Dekker)	
1999	Netherlands	Erik Dekker (victory shared with Marc Wauters)	
2000	United States	Lance Armstrong	
2000	Russia	Viatcheslav Ekimov	
2001	Belgium	Marc Wauters (victory shared with Erik Dekker)	
2001	Netherlands	Erik Dekker (victory shared with Marc Wauters)	
2002	Hungary	László Bodrogi (victory shared with Fabian Cancellara)	
2002	Switzerland	Fabian Cancellara (victory shared with László Bodrogi)	
2003	Germany	Michael Rich (victory shared with Uwe Peschel)	
2003	Germany	Uwe Peschel (victory shared with Michael Rich)	
2004	Netherlands	Thomas Dekker (victory shared with Koen de Kort)	
2004	Netherlands	Koen de Kort (victory shared with Thomas Dekker)	
