= 2001 Amstel Gold Race =

Dutch cycling race

The 2001 Amstel Gold Race was the 36th edition of the annual Amstel Gold Race road bicycle race, held on Saturday April 28, 2001 in the Limburg province, The Netherlands. The race stretched 257 kilometres, with the start and finish in Maastricht. There were a total of 190 competitors, with 37 finishing the race.

== Result ==
	Cyclist	Team	Time
1	Erik Dekker (NED)	Rabobank	6h 39' 13"
~~2~~	~~Lance Armstrong (USA)~~	U.S. Postal Service	s.t.
3	Serge Baguet (BEL)	Lotto–Adecco	+ 17"
4	Markus Zberg (SUI)	Rabobank	s.t.
5	Johan Museeuw (BEL)	Domo–Farm Frites–Latexco	s.t.
6	Peter Van Petegem (BEL)	Mercury–Viatel	+ 20"
7	Michele Bartoli (ITA)	Mapei–Quick-Step	s.t.
8	Davide Rebellin (ITA)	Liquigas–Pata	s.t.
9	Michael Boogerd (NED)	Rabobank	s.t.
10	Chris Peers (BEL)	Cofidis	s.t.
