= 1999 Ronde van Nederland =

Dutch cycling race

These are the results for the 39th edition of the Ronde van Nederland cycling race, which was held from August 24 to August 28, 1999. The race started in Gouda (South Holland) and finished in Landgraaf (Limburg).

== Final classification ==
RANK	NAME CYCLIST	TEAM	TIME
1.	Serhiy Honchar (UKR)	Vini Caldirola	21:02:32
2.	Erik Dekker (NED)	Rabobank	+ 0.07
3.	Dylan Casey (USA)	U.S. Postal Service	+ 0.17
4.	Johan Museeuw (BEL)	Mapei–Quick-Step	+ 0.19
5.	Enrico Cassani (ITA)	Team Polti	+ 0.23
6.	Peter Van Petegem (GER)	TVM–Farm Frites	+ 0.29
7.	Jan Ullrich (GER)	Team Telekom	+ 0.30
8.	Maarten den Bakker (NED)	Rabobank	+ 0.33
9.	Robbie McEwen (AUS)	Rabobank	+ 0.38
10.	Marco Serpellini (ITA)	Lampre–Daikin	+ 0.41
