= 1989 Gent–Wevelgem =

Race details
- Dates: 5 April 1989
- Stages: 1
- Distance: 276 km (171 mi)
- Winning time: 6h 29' 00"

Results
	Winner	Gerrit Solleveld (NED)	(Superconfex–Yoko–Opel–Colnago)
	Second	Sean Yates (GBR)	(7-Eleven)
	Third	Rolf Sørensen (DEN)	(Ariostea)

The 1989 Gent–Wevelgem was the 51st edition of the Belgian Gent–Wevelgem cycle race and was held on 5 April 1989. The race started in Ghent and finished in Wevelgem. The race was won by Gerrit Solleveld of the Superconfex team.

== General classification ==
Final general classification

Rank	Rider	Team	Time
1	Gerrit Solleveld (NED)	Superconfex–Yoko–Opel–Colnago	6h 29' 00"
2	Sean Yates (GBR)	7-Eleven	+ 0"
3	Rolf Sørensen (DEN)	Ariostea	+ 11"
4	Eric Vanderaerden (BEL)	Panasonic–Isostar–Colnago–Agu	+ 11"
5	Frank Pirard (NED)	Histor–Sigma	+ 11"
6	Dirk De Wolf (BEL)	Hitachi	+ 11"
7	Adriano Baffi (ITA)	Ariostea	+ 11"
8	Wilfried Peeters (BEL)	Histor–Sigma	+ 11"
9	Jan Van Camp (BEL)	Mini Flat–Isoglass	+ 11"
10	Jozef Lieckens (BEL)	Hitachi	+ 11"
