= 1999 Paris–Tours =

Race details
- Dates: 3 October 1999
- Stages: 1
- Distance: 254 km (157.8 mi)
- Winning time: 6h 09' 54"

Results
	Winner	Marc Wauters (BEL)	(Rabobank)
	Second	Gianni Faresin (ITA)	(Mapei–Quick-Step)
	Third	Jaan Kirsipuu (EST)	(Casino–Ag2r Prévoyance)

The 1999 Paris–Tours was the 93rd edition of the Paris–Tours cycle race and was held on 3 October 1999. The race started in Saint-Arnoult-en-Yvelines and finished in Tours. The race was won by Marc Wauters of the Rabobank team.

== General classification ==
Final general classification

Rank	Rider	Team	Time
1	Marc Wauters (BEL)	Rabobank	6h 09' 54"
2	Gianni Faresin (ITA)	Mapei–Quick-Step	+ 10"
3	Jaan Kirsipuu (EST)	Casino–Ag2r Prévoyance	+ 14"
4	Fabrizio Guidi (ITA)	Team Polti	+ 14"
5	Marco Serpellini (ITA)	Lampre–Daikin	+ 14"
6	Ludovic Capelle (BEL)	Home Market–Ville de Charleroi	+ 14"
7	Fabio Baldato (ITA)	Ballan–Alessio	+ 14"
8	Léon van Bon (NED)	Rabobank	+ 14"
9	Andrei Tchmil (BEL)	Lotto–Mobistar	+ 14"
10	Aart Vierhouten (NED)	Rabobank	+ 14"
