= 1996 Ronde van Nederland =

Dutch cycling race

The 36th Ronde van Nederland cycling race was held from August 27 to August 31, 1996. The race started in Gouda (South Holland) and finished after 880.2 kilometres in Landgraaf (Limburg).

== Stages ==
=== 27-08-1996: Gouda-Haarlem, 167 km ===
RANK	NAME CYCLIST	TEAM	TIME
1.	Federico Colonna (ITA)	Mapei-GB	03:43:05
2.	Robbie McEwen (AUS)	Rabobank	—
3.	Jans Koerts (NED)	Palmans	—

=== 28-08-1996: Haarlem-Almere, 195 km ===
RANK	NAME CYCLIST	TEAM	TIME
1.	Max van Heeswijk (NED)	Motorola	04:39:06
2.	Johan Capiot (BEL)	Collstrop–Garden	—
3.	Sven Teutenberg (GER)	U.S. Postal Service	—

=== 29-08-1996: Almere-Doetinchem, 125 km ===
RANK	NAME CYCLIST	TEAM	TIME
1.	Giovanni Lombardi (ITA)	Polti	02:35:29
2.	Rolf Sørensen (DEN)	Rabobank	—
3.	Lance Armstrong (USA)	Motorola	—

=== 29-08-1996: Doetinchem-Doetinchem (Time Trial), 19.6 km ===
RANK	NAME CYCLIST	TEAM	TIME
1.	Rolf Sørensen (DEN)	Rabobank	00:22:40
2.	Lance Armstrong (USA)	Motorola	+ 0.01
3.	Viatcheslav Ekimov (RUS)	Rabobank	+ 0.29

=== 30-08-1996: Zevenaar-Venray, 187 km ===
RANK	NAME CYCLIST	TEAM	TIME
1.	Erik Zabel (GER)	Telekom	04:28:30
2.	Jeroen Blijlevens (NED)	TVM-Farm Frites	—
3.	Federico Colonna (ITA)	Mapei-GB	—

=== 31-08-1996: Roermond-Landgraaf, 202 km ===
RANK	NAME CYCLIST	TEAM	TIME
1.	Olaf Ludwig (GER)	Telekom	04:48:02
2.	Giovanni Lombardi (ITA)	Polti	+ 0.05
3.	Tristan Hoffman (NED)	TVM-Farm Frites	—

== Final classification ==
RANK	NAME CYCLIST	TEAM	TIME
1.	Rolf Sørensen (DEN)	Rabobank	20:36:54
2.	Lance Armstrong (USA)	Motorola	+ 0.02
3.	Viatcheslav Ekimov (RUS)	Rabobank	+ 1.07
4.	Marco Lietti (ITA)	MG-Technogym	+ 1.16
5.	Erik Dekker (NED)	Rabobank	+ 1.23
6.	Olaf Ludwig (GER)	Telekom	+ 1.25
7.	Erik Breukink (NED)	Rabobank	—
8.	Maarten den Bakker (NED)	TVM-Farm Frites	+ 1.33
9.	Michael Andersson (SWE)	Telekom	+ 1.34
10.	Jesper Skibby (DEN)	TVM-Farm Frites	+ 1.45
