= 2004 Ronde van Nederland =

Dutch cycling race

- Forty-fourth edition of the Ronde van Nederland

Details
- Dates: August 24-28, 2004
- Location: Oudenbosch to Sittard-Geleen
- Races: 6

Champions
- Individual champion: (Netherlands) Erik Dekker

These are the results for the 44th edition of the Ronde van Nederland cycling race, which was held from August 24 to August 28, 2004. The race started in Oudenbosch and finished in Sittard-Geleen. It was won by Holland's Erik Dekker. It was the last edition of the event, which was renamed Eneco Tour for the UCI ProTour.

== Stages ==
=== 24-08-2004: Oudenbosch-Hoorn, 205 km ===
RANK	FIRST STAGE - TIME TRIAL	TEAM	TIME
1.	Max van Heeswijk (NED)	US Postal Service	04:34.50
2.	Francesco Chicchi (ITA)	Fassa Bortolo	—
3.	Aurélien Clerc (SUI)	Quick Step-Davitamon	—

=== 25-08-2004: Bolsward-Nijverdal, 182.5 km ===
RANK	SECOND STAGE	TEAM	TIME
1.	Max van Heeswijk (NED)	US Postal Service	04:11.36
2.	Alexandre Usov (BLR)	Phonak Hearing Systems	—
3.	Stefan van Dijk (NED)	Lotto-Domo	—

=== 26-08-2004: Kleve-Goch, 86.2 km ===
RANK	THIRD STAGE	TEAM	TIME
1.	Alessandro Petacchi (ITA)	Fassa Bortolo	01:58:53
2.	Lars Michaelsen (DEN)	Team CSC	—
3.	Luciano Pagliarini (BRA)	Lampre	—

=== 26-08-2004: Goch-Goch, 22.2 km ===
RANK	FOURTH STAGE - TIME TRIAL	TEAM	TIME
1.	Viatcheslav Ekimov (RUS)	US Postal Service	00:26:03
2.	Marc Wauters (BEL)	Rabobank	+ 0.09
3.	Floyd Landis (USA)	US Postal Service	—

=== 27-08-2004: Düsseldorf (Ger)-Sittard/Geleen, 221.9 km ===
RANK	FIFTH STAGE	TEAM	TIME
1.	Léon van Bon (NED)	Lotto-Domo	05:10:28
2.	Marc Streel (BEL)	Landbouwkrediet-Colnago	+ 1.06
3.	Manuel Quinziato (ITA)	Lampre	+ 1.43

=== 28-08-2004: Sittard/Geleen-Landgraaf, 197.7 km ===
RANK	SIXTH STAGE	TEAM	TIME
1.	Erik Dekker (NED)	Rabobank	04:58:16
2.	Marc Wauters (BEL)	Rabobank	—
3.	Fabrizio Guidi (ITA)	Team CSC	—

== Final classification ==
RANK	FIRST STAGE	TEAM	TIME
1.	Erik Dekker (NED)	Rabobank	21:21:52
2.	Viatcheslav Ekimov (RUS)	US Postal Service	+ 0.01
3.	Marc Wauters (BEL)	Rabobank	+ 0.04
4.	Bart Voskamp (NED)	Chocolade Jacques	+ 0.20
5.	Bobby Julich (USA)	Team CSC	+ 0.21
6.	Frank Høj (DEN)	Team CSC	+ 0.34
7.	Rolf Aldag (GER)	T-Mobile Team	+ 0.35
8.	Cyril Dessel (FRA)	Phonak Hearing Systems	+ 0.44
9.	László Bodrogi (HUN)	Quick Step-Davitamon	—
10.	Marco Pinotti (ITA)	Lampre	+ 0.49
