= 1992 Ronde van Nederland =

Dutch cycling race

Ronde van Nederland 1992 was a cycling race held in the Netherlands, and it was the 32nd such race held from 17 to 22 August 1992. The race started in Zoetermeer (South Holland) and finished in Gulpen (Limburg).

== Stages ==
- 17-08-1992: Zoetermeer-Zoetermeer (Prologue), 5.6 km
- 18-08-1992: Nijkerk-Veendam, 203.5 km
- 19-08-1992: Hardenberg-Haaksbergen, 93 km
- 19-08-1992: Haaksbergen-Haaksbergen (Time Trial), 31 km
- 20-08-1992: Arnhem-Tilburg, 163.5 km
- 21-08-1992: Tilburg-Heythuysen, 183 km
- 22-08-1992: Heythuysen-Gulpen, 176 km

== Final classification ==
RANK	NAME CYCLIST	TEAM	TIME
1.	Jelle Nijdam (NED)	Buckler–Colnago–Decca	20:36:31
2.	Thierry Marie (FRA)	Castorama	+ 0.43
3.	Laurent Bezault (FRA)	Z	+ 0.55
4.	Sean Yates (GBR)	Motorola	+ 1.17
5.	Rob Harmeling (NED)	TVM–Sanyo	+ 1.22
6.	Erik Breukink (NED)	PDM–Ultima–Concorde	+ 1.24
7.	Dimitri Zhdanov (RUS)	Panasonic–Sportlife	+ 1.39
8.	Marco Lietti (ITA)	Ariostea	+ 1.43
9.	Eddy Seigneur (FRA)	Z	+ 1.45
10.	Herman Frison (BEL)	Tulip Computers	+ 2.01
