= Marc Wauters =

Belgian cyclist

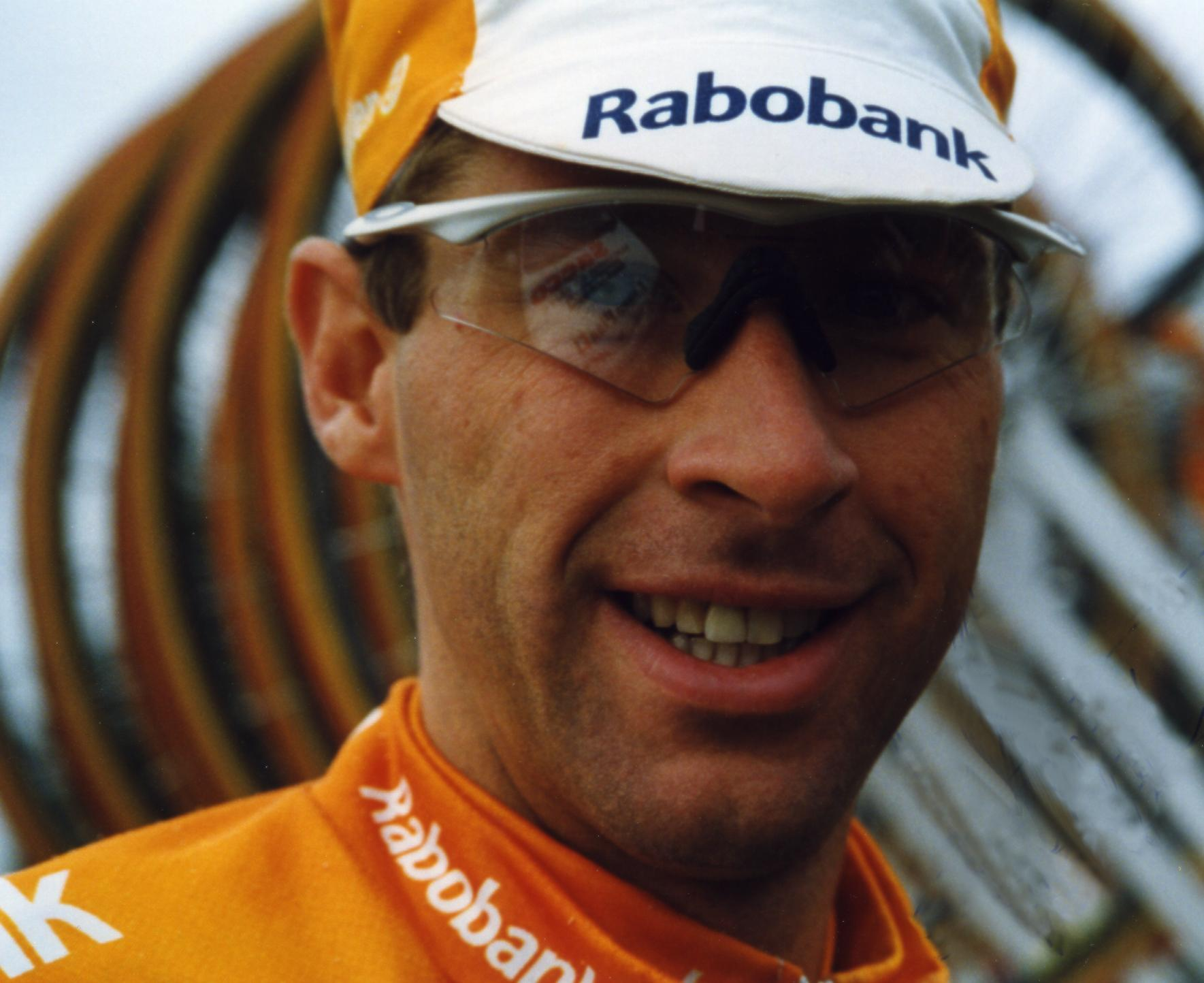

Personal information
- Full name: Marc Wauters
- Nickname: De Soldaat (The Soldier)
- Born: 23 February 1969 (age 57) Hasselt, Belgium
- Height: 1.85 m (6 ft 1 in)
- Weight: 73 kg (161 lb; 11 st 7 lb)

Cycling career
- Sport: Cycling
- Current team: Lotto–Intermarché
- Discipline: Road
- Role: Rider; Directeur sportif
- Rider type: Time triallist

Professional teams
- 1991–1993: Lotto
- 1994–1995: WordPerfect–Colnago–Decca
- 1996–1997: Lotto
- 1998–2006: Rabobank

Managerial team
- 2009–: Silence–Lotto

Major wins
- Grand Tours Tour de France 1 individual stage (2001) Stage races Paris–Tours (1999) Prudential Tour (1999) Tour de Luxembourg (1999) One-day races and Classics National Time Trial Championships (2002, 2003, 2005)

Marc Wauters (born 23 February 1969 in Hasselt, Belgium) is a Belgian former cyclist who was professional from 1991 until 2006. The 2004 Olympian, nicknamed The Soldier was a member of the Rabobank cycling team of the UCI ProTour since 1998 and had to end his career several weeks short because of a broken collarbone which he suffered during a training on 20 September 2006.

He currently works as a directeur sportif for UCI ProTeam Lotto–Intermarché.

Wauters participated at the 2000 Summer Olympics in Sydney and at the 2004 Summer Olympics in Athens where he took part in both the road race and the time trial without any success. In his early career, between 1991 and 1996 he won several of the smaller road races in The Netherlands and Belgium he was cycling in. The only exception to this was his win in the 5th stage of the 1995 Vuelta a Andalucía.

In 1997 and 1998 Wauters didn't win a single race, although he became 7th at the World Cycling Championships 1998, his highest position in this event during his career. From 1999 on after winning the Grand Prix Eddy Merckx he started achieving wins again. In this year he also won Paris–Tours, 2 stages in the Tour de Luxembourg plus the overall ranking and the overall classification in the Rheinland-Pfalz Rundfahrt. Trying to defend his title in Rheinland-Pfalz he won 3rd stage in 2000. At the end of the tour he had defended his title successively. He won the Grand Prix Eddy Merckx for the second time in his career in 2001. Wauters was known as a worker in the peloton and didn't win much, but helped his teammates achieving decent results. Meanwhile, he developed himself into one of Belgium's best time trial specialists, winning the Belgium championships in 2002, 2003 and 2005. At the 2004 World Championships he finished on a 7th position.

On 15 October 2006 a memorial race was held in Zolder, Belgium to wave Wauters officially goodbye from the sport.

== Major results ==
1986
3rd Time trial, National Junior Road Championships
1987
National Junior Road Championships

1st Time trial
2nd Road race

1989
3rd Overall Ruban Granitier Breton
1990
3rd Flèche Ardennaise
3rd Seraing–Aachen–Seraing
1991
1st Liedekerkse Pijl
3rd Grand Prix de la Ville de Rennes
8th Overall Tour de Luxembourg
1992
10th Rund um den Henninger Turm
1994
1st Ronde van Limburg
1st Ster van Zwolle
1st Grote Prijs Stad Zottegem
3rd Circuit des Frontières
7th Le Samyn
1995
4th Overall Vuelta a Andalucía

1st Stage 5

5th Grote Prijs Jef Scherens
1996
1st Sint-Truiden Criterium
1st Stage 6 Four Days of Dunkirk
4th GP Rik Van Steenbergen
8th Overall Tour Méditerranéen
1997
2nd Druivenkoers-Overijse
5th Brabantse Pijl
7th Paris–Roubaix
8th Overall Tour de la Region Wallonne
1998
5th Druivenkoers-Overijse
7th Road race, UCI Road World Championships
1999
1st Overall Prudential Tour
1st Overall Tour de Luxembourg

1st Stages 1 & 4 (ITT)

1st Overall Rheinland-Pfalz Rundfahrt

1st Stage 1

1st Grand Prix Eddy Merckx (with Erik Dekker)
1st Paris–Tours
4th Tour de Berne
5th Overall Paris–Nice
2000
1st Overall Rheinland-Pfalz Rundfahrt

1st Stage 3b (ITT)

1st Peer Criterium
1st Josef Voegeli Memorial
3rd Grand Prix Eddy Merckx (with Erik Dekker)
3rd EnBW Grand Prix (with Erik Dekker)
4th E3 Prijs Vlaanderen
7th Paris–Roubaix
7th Overall Tirreno–Adriatico
8th Overall Ronde van Nederland
2001
1st Grand Prix Eddy Merckx
1st Stage 2 Tour de France
2nd Overall Vuelta a Andalucía
4th GP Rik Van Steenbergen
4th Kuurne–Brussels–Kuurne
2002
1st Time trial, National Road Championships
3rd Grand Prix Eddy Merckx (with Erik Dekker)
4th Overall Tour de Luxembourg
6th Overall Ronde van Nederland
8th Overall Three Days of De Panne
2003
1st Time trial, National Road Championships
2nd Veenendaal–Veenendaal
4th Paris–Roubaix
6th Overall Ronde van Nederland
6th Overall Tour de Luxembourg
7th Time trial, UCI Road World Championships
2004
1st Kortrijk Criterium
2nd Time trial, National Road Championships
3rd Overall Ronde van Nederland
4th Grand Prix Eddy Merckx (with Erik Dekker)
5th Overall Three Days of De Panne
6th Paris–Brussels
7th Time trial, UCI Road World Championships
7th LuK Challenge
2005
1st Time trial, National Road Championships
3rd Overall Niedersachsen-Rundfahrt
5th LuK Challenge
8th Schaal Sels
2006
1st Peer Criterium
1st 's Gravenwezel Criterium
3rd Time trial, National Road Championships
3rd LuK Challenge

=== Tour de France results ===
Wauters started in a total of 10 Tour de France editions, finishing in Paris eight times. His highest final ranking was 43rd in 2000. The year after, during the 2001 Tour de France Wauters won the second stage, held from Calais to Antwerp. He was part of a breakaway containing 16 cyclists together with teammate Erik Dekker. Wauters got away from the group together with Arnaud Pretot who he beat in the final sprint. Because of his decent result in the prologue two days prior in Dunkerque he wore the yellow jersey for a day, before losing it to Stuart O'Grady.

- 1993 - 107th
- 1994 - 92nd
- 1996 - 124th
- 1999 - Did not finish
- 2000 - 43rd
- 2001 - Winner stage 2, Did not finish
- 2002 - 91st
- 2003 - 115th
- 2004 - 112th
- 2005 - 140th
