= Gerrit Solleveld =

Dutch cyclist

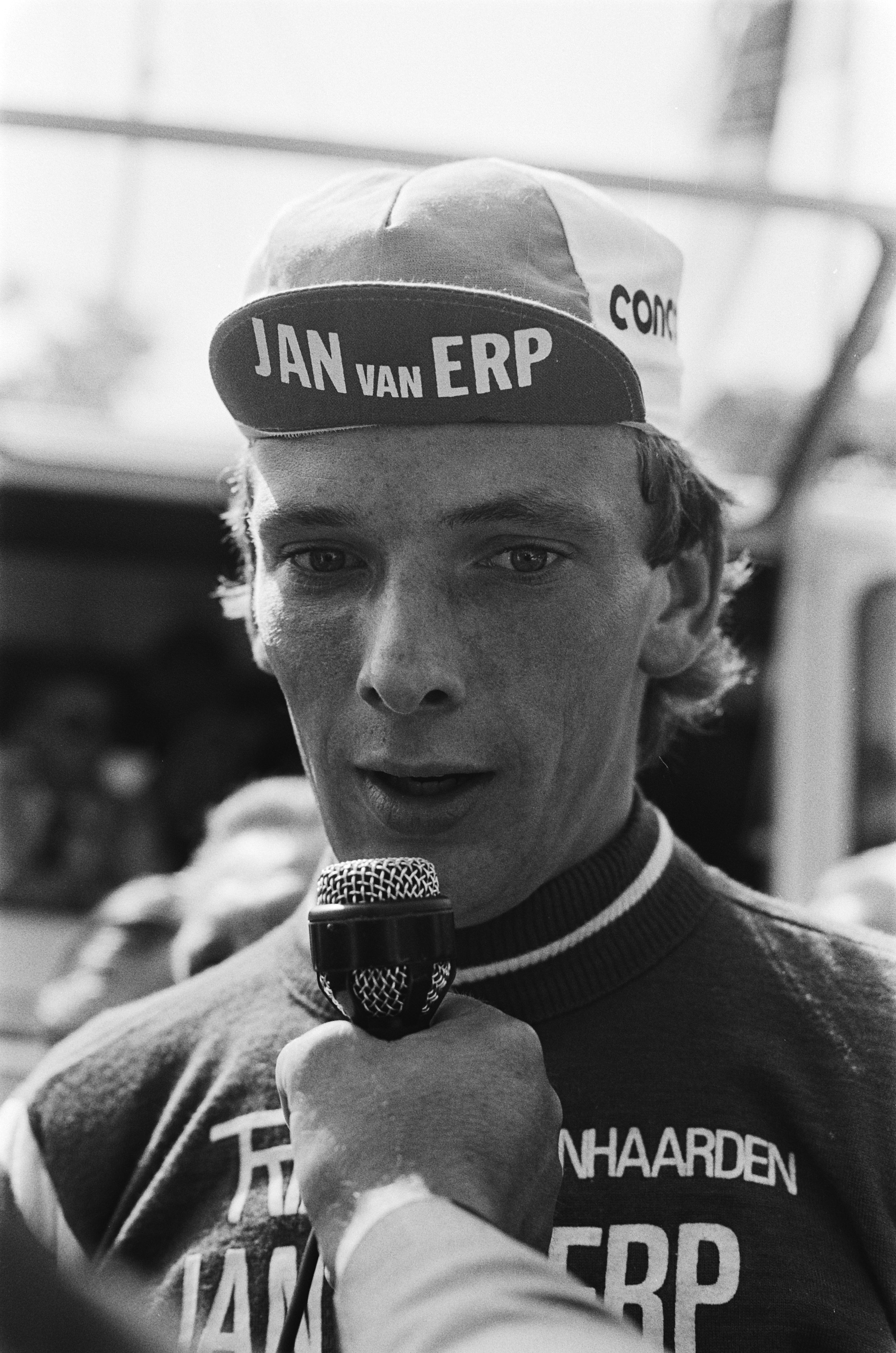

Personal information
- Full name: Gerrit Solleveld
- Born: 8 June 1961 (age 65) Vriezenveen, the Netherlands

Cycling career
- Sport: Cycling
- Discipline: Road
- Role: Rider

Major wins
- Grand Tours Tour de France Intermediate sprints classification (1986) 2 individual stages (1985, 1990) One-day races and Classics Gent–Wevelgem (1989)

Gerrit Solleveld (born 8 June 1961 in De Lier) is a former Dutch professional road bicycle racer, who won two stages in the Tour de France.

== Major results ==
1982
1st World Amateur 100km Team Time Trial Championship
1st Olympia's Tour
1983
Netherlands National Amateur Road Race Championship
1985
1st Stage 4 Tour de France
1st Profronde van Surhuisterveen
1986
1st Intermediate sprints classification Tour de France
1st Profronde van Pijnacker
1st Delta Profronde
1st Steenwijk
1987
1st Groot-Ammers
1st Tour Méditerranéen
1988
1st Profronde van Wateringen
1st GP Libération
1989
1st Gent–Wevelgem
1st Apeldoorn
1990
1st stage 5 Tour de France
1st Acht van Chaam
1st Delta Profronde
1991
1st Noordwijk-aan-zee
