= 2014 Vuelta a España =

69th edition of the cycling race

2014 UCI World Tour, race 22 of 29
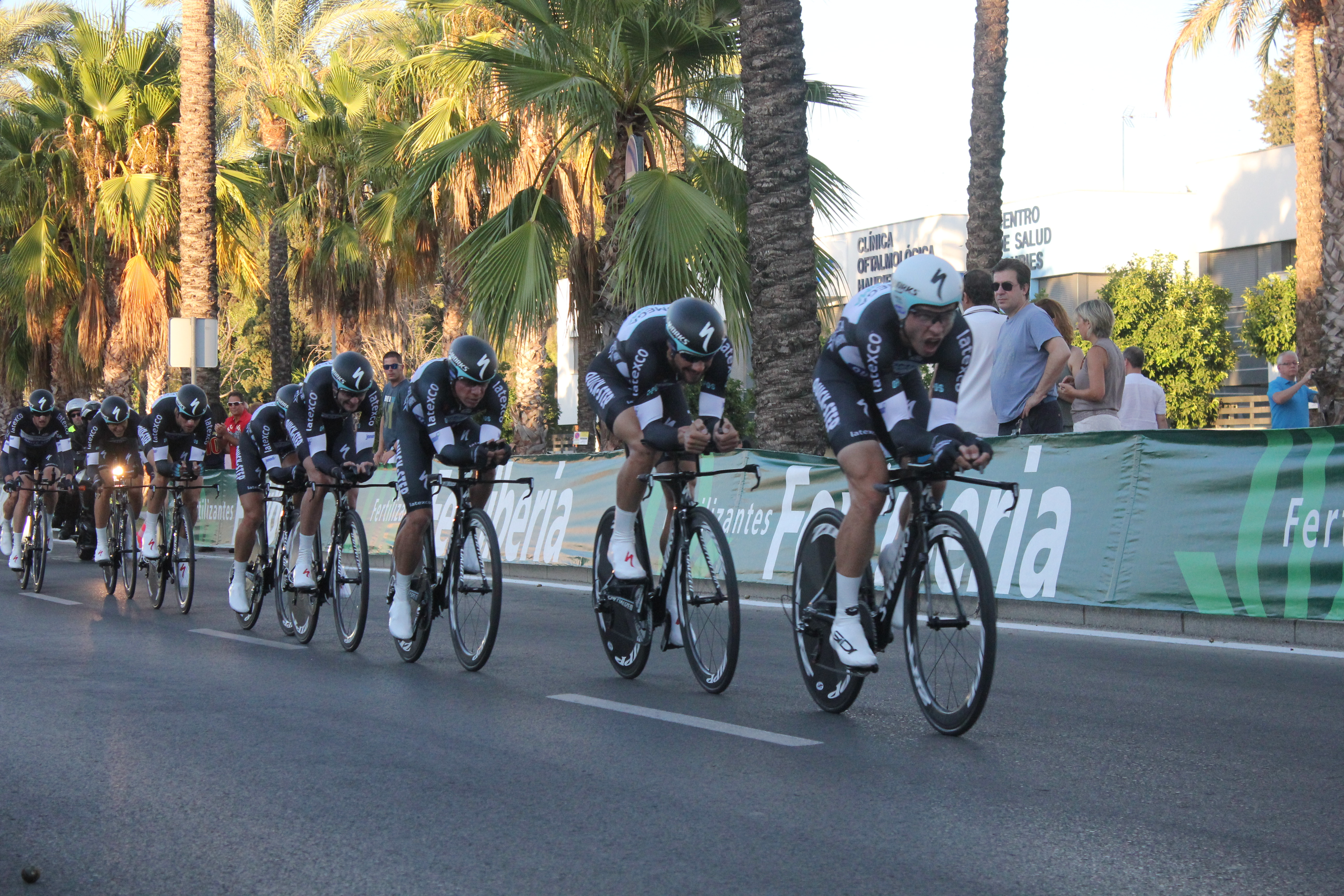

Race details
- Dates: 23 August – 14 September
- Stages: 21
- Distance: 3,181.5 km (1,977 mi)
- Winning time: 81h 25' 05"

Results
Jersey awarded to the overall winner	Winner	Alberto Contador (ESP)	(Tinkoff–Saxo)
	Second	Chris Froome (GBR)	(Team Sky)
	Third	Alejandro Valverde (ESP)	(Movistar Team)
Jersey awarded to the points classification winner	Points	John Degenkolb (GER)	(Giant–Shimano)
Jersey awarded to the mountains classification winner	Mountains	Luis León Sánchez (ESP)	(Caja Rural–Seguros RGA)
Jersey awarded to the combination classification winner	Combination	Alberto Contador (ESP)	(Tinkoff–Saxo)
	Team	(Russia) Team Katusha	

The 2014 Vuelta a España took place between 23 August and 14 September 2014 and was the 69th edition of the race. It featured eight mountain stages, five hill stages, five flat stages, and three time trials (one team and two individual), two of which appeared at the beginning and end of the race. Jerez de la Frontera, on the Spanish south coast, hosted the opening stage. The Vuelta then went counterclockwise, through the south-east and east of the country before crossing the north and finishing in Santiago de Compostela. This was the first time in 21 years that the race has finished outside Madrid.

The race was won for the third time by Spanish rider, Alberto Contador, of Tinkoff–Saxo. Contador went into the race uncertain of his form after crashing out of the Tour on the 10th stage, breaking his tibia. However, Contador found his form in the race earlier than expected, taking the red jersey on the 10th stage individual time trial and taking two key mountain stage wins on his way to victory. He won the race by 1' 10" over runner-up, Chris Froome of Team Sky. Like Contador, Froome also went into the race uncertain of his form after he crashed three times in two days during the Tour, leading to his withdrawal. However, Froome came to life during the third week, finishing second in three key mountain stages and taking time to move into second place overall. Spanish rider Alejandro Valverde of the Movistar Team completed the podium, finishing 40 seconds behind Froome and 1 minute and 50 seconds behind Contador. Valverde also took the sixth stage of the race going to La Zubia, the race's first mountain stage.

In the race's other classifications, John Degenkolb of Giant–Shimano won the green jersey for the points classification. Degenkolb took four stage wins, the most by any rider in the race. The blue polka-dot jersey for the mountains classification was taken by Spaniard Luis León Sánchez of Caja Rural–Seguros RGA. Aside from taking the red jersey, Contador also won the white jersey for the combination classification. He took the first place in the general classification, third place in the points classification and second place in the mountains classification. Team Katusha took the team classification for accumulating the lowest time from their three best cyclists.

== Teams ==
The 18 UCI World Tour teams were automatically entitled to start the race; four wildcard teams were also invited.

- Ag2r–La Mondiale
- Astana
- Belkin Pro Cycling
- BMC Racing Team
- Cannondale
- Caja Rural–Seguros RGA†
- Cofidis†
- FDJ.fr
- Giant–Shimano
- Garmin–Sharp
- IAM Cycling†
- Lampre–Merida
- Lotto–Belisol
- Movistar Team
- MTN–Qhubeka†
- Omega Pharma–Quick-Step
- Orica–GreenEDGE
- Team Europcar
- Team Katusha
- Team Sky
- Tinkoff–Saxo
- Trek Factory Racing

†: Invited UCI Pro Continental teams

== Pre-race favourites ==
Before the start of the race, defending champion, Chris Horner, 2014 Giro d'Italia champion Nairo Quintana, Joaquim Rodríguez and Alejandro Valverde were among the favourites for overall victory. After abandoning the Tour de France, Chris Froome and Alberto Contador announced they would compete in the Vuelta. Other possible contenders could emerge from Wilco Kelderman, Carlos Betancur, Fabio Aru, Thibaut Pinot, Ryder Hesjedal, Rigoberto Urán, Andrew Talansky and Dan Martin.

The day before the Vuelta began, Chris Horner was withdrawn from the race due to low levels of cortisol. This is because Lampre Merida (UAE Team Emirates XRG) are part of the Mouvement pour un cyclisme crédible (MPCC) which forbids cyclists from racing when cortisol concentrations drop below a specified threshold. On stage 11, Nairo Quintana withdrew from the race after crashing twice in two days.

== Route ==
Stage characteristics and winners
Stage	Date	Course	Distance	Type		Winner
1	23 August	Jerez de la Frontera	12.6 km (7.8 mi)	Team time trial	Team time trial	(Spain) Movistar Team
2	24 August	Algeciras to San Fernando	174.4 km (108.4 mi)		Flat stage	Nacer Bouhanni (FRA)
3	25 August	Cádiz to Arcos de la Frontera	197.8 km (122.9 mi)		Hilly stage	Michael Matthews (AUS)
4	26 August	Mairena del Alcor to Córdoba	164.7 km (102.3 mi)		Medium-mountain stage	John Degenkolb (GER)
5	27 August	Priego de Córdoba to Ronda	180 km (110 mi)		Flat stage	John Degenkolb (GER)
6	28 August	Benalmádena to Cumbres Verdes, La Zubia	167.1 km (103.8 mi)		Mountain stage	Alejandro Valverde (ESP)
7	29 August	Alhendín to Alcaudete	169 km (105 mi)		Hilly stage	Alessandro De Marchi (ITA)
8	30 August	Baeza to Albacete	207 km (129 mi)		Flat stage	Nacer Bouhanni (FRA)
9	31 August	Carboneras de Guadazaón to Aramón Valdelinares	185 km (115 mi)		Mountain stage	Winner Anacona (COL)
	1 September	Rest day				
10	2 September	Monasterio de Santa María de Veruela to Borja	36.7 km (22.8 mi)	Time trial	Individual time trial	Tony Martin (GER)
11	3 September	Pamplona to Santuario de San Miguel de Aralar	153.4 km (95.3 mi)		Mountain stage	Fabio Aru (ITA)
12	4 September	Logroño to Logroño	166.4 km (103.4 mi)		Flat stage	John Degenkolb (GER)
13	5 September	Belorado to Obregón, Parque de Cabárceno	188.7 km (117.3 mi)		Medium-mountain stage	Daniel Navarro (ESP)
14	6 September	Santander to La Camperona, Valle de Sábero	200.8 km (124.8 mi)		Mountain stage	Ryder Hesjedal (CAN)
15	7 September	Oviedo to Lagos de Covadonga	152.2 km (94.6 mi)		Mountain stage	Przemysław Niemiec (POL)
16	8 September	San Martín del Rey Aurelio to La Farrapona, Lagos de Somiedo	160.5 km (99.7 mi)		Mountain stage	Alberto Contador (ESP)
	9 September	Rest day				
17	10 September	Ortigueira to A Coruña	190.7 km (118.5 mi)		Flat stage	John Degenkolb (GER)
18	11 September	A Estrada to Mont Castrove, Meis	157 km (98 mi)		Medium-mountain stage	Fabio Aru (ITA)
19	12 September	Salvaterra de Miño to Cangas do Morrazo	180.5 km (112.2 mi)		Medium-mountain stage	Adam Hansen (AUS)
20	13 September	Santo Estevo de Ribas de Sil to Puerto de Ancares	185.7 km (115.4 mi)		Mountain stage	Alberto Contador (ESP)
21	14 September	Santiago de Compostela	9.7 km (6.0 mi)	Time trial	Individual time trial	Adriano Malori (ITA)
Total			3,181.5 km (1,976.9 mi)			

== Classification leadership table ==
There were four main classifications contested in the 2014 Vuelta a España, with the most important being the general classification. The general classification was calculated by adding each cyclist's finishing times on each stage. The cyclist with the least accumulated time was the race leader, identified by the red jersey; the winner of this classification was considered the winner of the Vuelta. In 2014, there were time bonuses given on mass-start stages; ten seconds were awarded to the stage winner, with six for second and four for third.

Additionally, there was a points classification, which awards a green jersey. In the points classification, cyclists get points for finishing among the best in a stage finish, or in intermediate sprints. The cyclist with the most points led the classification, and is identified with a green jersey. There was also a mountains classification. The organisation categorised some climbs as either Categoria Especial, first, second or third category; points for this classification were won by the first cyclists that reach the top of these climbs, with more points available for the higher-categorised climbs. The cyclist with the most points led the classification, and was identified with a blue polka dot jersey.

The fourth individual classification was the combination classification, marked by the white jersey. This classification is calculated by adding the numeral ranks of each cyclist in the general, points and mountains classifications – a rider must have a score in all classifications possible to qualify for the combination classification – with the lowest cumulative total signifying the winner of this competition.

For the team classification, the times of the best three cyclists per team on each stage were added; the leading team is the team with the lowest total time. For the combativity award, a jury gives points after each stage to the cyclists they considered most combative. The cyclist with the most votes in all stages leads the classification. For the daily combative winner, the rider in question donned a dossard with a red background, on the following stage.

Stage	Winner	General classification	Points classification	Mountains classification	Combination classification	Team classification	Combativity award
1	Movistar Team	Jonathan Castroviejo	not awarded	not awarded	not awarded	Movistar Team	not awarded
2	Nacer Bouhanni	Alejandro Valverde	Nacer Bouhanni	Nathan Haas	Valerio Conti	Movistar Team	Javier Aramendia
3	Michael Matthews	Michael Matthews	Nacer Bouhanni	Lluís Mas	Lluís Mas	Belkin Pro Cycling	Lluís Mas
4	John Degenkolb	Michael Matthews	Michael Matthews	Lluís Mas	Valerio Conti	Belkin Pro Cycling	Amets Txurruka
5	John Degenkolb	Michael Matthews	John Degenkolb	Lluís Mas	Sergio Pardilla	Belkin Pro Cycling	Pim Ligthart
6	Alejandro Valverde	Alejandro Valverde	John Degenkolb	Lluís Mas	Alejandro Valverde	Belkin Pro Cycling	Pim Ligthart
7	Alessandro De Marchi	Alejandro Valverde	John Degenkolb	Lluís Mas	Alejandro Valverde	Belkin Pro Cycling	Ryder Hesjedal
8	Nacer Bouhanni	Alejandro Valverde	John Degenkolb	Lluís Mas	Alejandro Valverde	Belkin Pro Cycling	Javier Aramendia
9	Winner Anacona	Nairo Quintana	John Degenkolb	Lluís Mas	Alejandro Valverde	Movistar Team	Lluís Mas
10	Tony Martin	Alberto Contador	John Degenkolb	Lluís Mas	Alejandro Valverde	Movistar Team	Tony Martin
11	Fabio Aru	Alberto Contador	John Degenkolb	Lluís Mas	Alejandro Valverde	Movistar Team	Vasil Kiryienka
12	John Degenkolb	Alberto Contador	John Degenkolb	Lluís Mas	Alejandro Valverde	Movistar Team	Matthias Krizek
13	Daniel Navarro	Alberto Contador	John Degenkolb	Lluís Mas	Alejandro Valverde	Movistar Team	Luis León Sánchez
14	Ryder Hesjedal	Alberto Contador	John Degenkolb	Luis León Sánchez	Alejandro Valverde	Movistar Team	Luis León Sánchez
15	Przemysław Niemiec	Alberto Contador	John Degenkolb	Alejandro Valverde	Alejandro Valverde	Team Katusha	Javier Aramendia
16	Alberto Contador	Alberto Contador	John Degenkolb	Luis León Sánchez	Alejandro Valverde	Team Katusha	Luis León Sánchez
17	John Degenkolb	Alberto Contador	John Degenkolb	Luis León Sánchez	Alejandro Valverde	Team Katusha	Bob Jungels
18	Fabio Aru	Alberto Contador	John Degenkolb	Luis León Sánchez	Alberto Contador	Team Katusha	Luis León Sánchez
19	Adam Hansen	Alberto Contador	John Degenkolb	Luis León Sánchez	Alberto Contador	Team Katusha	Pim Ligthart
20	Alberto Contador	Alberto Contador	John Degenkolb	Luis León Sánchez	Alberto Contador	Team Katusha	Jérôme Coppel
21	Adriano Malori	Alberto Contador	John Degenkolb	Luis León Sánchez	Alberto Contador	Team Katusha	Adriano Malori
Final		Alberto Contador	John Degenkolb	Luis León Sánchez	Alberto Contador	Team Katusha	Chris Froome

Notes

- In Stage 4 Danilo Wyss, who was second in the combination classification, wore the white jersey, because Lluís Mas (in first place) wore the blue polka-dot jersey as leader of the mountains classification during that stage.
- In Stage 5, John Degenkolb, who was second in the points classification, wore the green jersey, because Michael Matthews (in first place) wore the red jersey as leader of the general classification during that stage.
- In Stages 7–9, Chris Froome, who was second in the combination classification, wore the white jersey, because Alejandro Valverde (in first place) wore the red jersey as leader of the general classification during that stage.
- In Stage 16, Joaquim Rodríguez, who was third in the combination classification, wore the white jersey, because Alejandro Valverde (in first place) wore the blue polka-dot jersey as leader of the mountains classification during that stage, while Alberto Contador (in second place) wore the red jersey as leader of the general classification during that stage.
- In Stages 19–21, Alejandro Valverde, who was second in the combination classification, wore the white jersey, because Alberto Contador (in first place) wore the red jersey as leader of the general classification during that stage.

== Classification standings ==
Legend
Red jersey	Denotes the leader of the General classification	Blue polka dot jersey	Denotes the leader of the Mountains classification
Green jersey	Denotes the leader of the Points classification	White jersey	Denotes the leader of the Combination rider classification

=== General classification ===
	Rider	Team	Time
1	Alberto Contador (ESP)	Tinkoff–Saxo	81h 25' 05"
2	Chris Froome (GBR)	Team Sky	+ 1' 10"
3	Alejandro Valverde (ESP)	Movistar Team	+ 1' 50"
4	Joaquim Rodríguez (ESP)	Team Katusha	+ 3' 25"
5	Fabio Aru (ITA)	Astana	+ 4' 48"
6	Samuel Sánchez (ESP)	BMC Racing Team	+ 9' 30"
7	Dan Martin (IRL)	Garmin–Sharp	+ 10' 38"
8	Warren Barguil (FRA)	Giant–Shimano	+ 11' 50"
9	Damiano Caruso (ITA)	Cannondale	+ 12' 50"
10	Daniel Navarro (ESP)	Cofidis	+ 13' 02"

=== Points classification ===
	Rider	Team	Points
1	John Degenkolb (GER)	Giant–Shimano	169
2	Alejandro Valverde (ESP)	Movistar Team	146
3	Alberto Contador (ESP)	Tinkoff–Saxo	145
4	Chris Froome (GBR)	Team Sky	139
5	Joaquim Rodríguez (ESP)	Team Katusha	117
6	Michael Matthews (AUS)	Orica–GreenEDGE	105
7	Fabio Aru (ITA)	Astana	103
8	Dan Martin (IRL)	Garmin–Sharp	85
9	Jasper Stuyven (BEL)	Trek Factory Racing	71
10	Damiano Caruso (ITA)	Cannondale	61

=== King of the Mountains classification ===
	Rider	Team	Points
1	Luis León Sánchez (ESP)	Caja Rural–Seguros RGA	58
2	Alberto Contador (ESP)	Tinkoff–Saxo	45
3	Alejandro Valverde (ESP)	Movistar Team	40
4	Przemysław Niemiec (POL)	Lampre–Merida	33
5	Chris Froome (GBR)	Team Sky	33
6	Lluís Mas (ESP)	Caja Rural–Seguros RGA	20
7	Fabio Aru (ITA)	Astana	19
8	Joaquim Rodríguez (ESP)	Team Katusha	19
9	Winner Anacona (COL)	Lampre–Merida	18
10	Alessandro De Marchi (ITA)	Cannondale	18

=== Combination classification ===
	Rider	Team	Points
1	Alberto Contador (ESP)	Tinkoff–Saxo	6
2	Alejandro Valverde (ESP)	Movistar Team	8
3	Chris Froome (GBR)	Team Sky	11
4	Joaquim Rodríguez (ESP)	Team Katusha	17
5	Fabio Aru (ITA)	Astana	19
6	Ryder Hesjedal (CAN)	Garmin–Sharp	48
7	Przemysław Niemiec (POL)	Lampre–Merida	49
8	Winner Anacona (COL)	Lampre–Merida	62
9	Warren Barguil (FRA)	Giant–Shimano	63
10	Samuel Sánchez (ESP)	BMC Racing Team	64

=== Team classification ===
Pos.	Team	Time
1	(Russia) Team Katusha	244h 19' 36"
2	(Spain) Movistar Team	+ 38' 54"
3	(Russia) Tinkoff–Saxo	+ 40' 16"
4	(France) Cofidis	+ 52' 33"
5	(United Kingdom) Team Sky	+ 1h 06' 31"
6	(Kazakhstan) Astana	+ 1h 08' 09"
7	(United States) Garmin–Sharp	+ 1h 17' 06"
8	(United States) BMC Racing Team	+ 1h 17' 32"
9	(Netherlands) Belkin Pro Cycling	+ 2h 13' 06"
10	(Belgium) Lotto–Belisol	+ 2h 54' 48"
