= 2014 Vuelta a España, Stage 12 to Stage 21 =

Cycling race stages

The 2014 Vuelta a España began on 23 August, with Stage 21 scheduled for 14 September. The 2014 edition of the cycle race began with the only team time trial stage of the race, in Jerez de la Frontera.

Legend (Note: Jerseys appearing in the table on the left of the page indicate those worn by the cyclist during the particular stage, while those appearing in the table on the right of the page indicate those awarded to the cyclist after the stage.)
A red jersey	Denotes the leader of the General classification	A bluedotted jersey	Denotes the leader of the Mountains classification
A green jersey	Denotes the leader of the Points classification	A white jersey	Denotes the leader of the Combination classification
A jersey with a white rider number on a red background	Denotes the rider designated as the day's most combative		

== Stage 12 ==
4 September 2014 — Logroño to Logroño, 168 km (104.4 mi)

Stage 12 result

	Rider	Team	Time
1	John Degenkolb (GER)	Giant–Shimano	4h 11' 18"
2	Tom Boonen (BEL)	Omega Pharma–Quick-Step	+ 0"
3	Jacopo Guarnieri (ITA)	Astana	+ 0"
4	Peter Sagan (SVK)	Cannondale	+ 0"
5	Maximiliano Richeze (ARG)	Lampre–Merida	+ 0"
6	Yannick Martinez (FRA)	Team Europcar	+ 0"
7	Lloyd Mondory (FRA)	Ag2r–La Mondiale	+ 0"
8	Fabian Cancellara (SWI)	Trek Factory Racing	+ 0"
9	Jasper Stuyven (BEL)	Trek Factory Racing	+ 0"
10	Guillaume Boivin (CAN)	Cannondale	+ 0"

General classification after stage 12

	Rider	Team	Time
1	Alberto Contador (ESP)	Tinkoff–Saxo	44h 38' 14"
2	Alejandro Valverde (ESP)	Movistar Team	+ 20"
3	Rigoberto Urán (COL)	Omega Pharma–Quick-Step	+ 1' 08"
4	Chris Froome (GBR)	Team Sky	+ 1' 20"
5	Joaquim Rodríguez (ESP)	Team Katusha	+ 1' 35"
6	Samuel Sánchez (ESP)	BMC Racing Team	+ 1' 52"
7	Fabio Aru (ITA)	Astana	+ 2' 13"
8	Winner Anacona (COL)	Lampre–Merida	+ 2' 22"
9	Robert Gesink (NED)	Belkin Pro Cycling	+ 2' 55"
10	Damiano Caruso (ITA)	Cannondale	+ 3' 51"

== Stage 13 ==
5 September 2014 — Belorado to Obregón, Parque de Cabárceno, 182 km (113.1 mi)

Stage 13 result

	Rider	Team	Time
1	Daniel Navarro (ESP)	Cofidis	4h 21' 04"
2	Daniel Moreno (ESP)	Team Katusha	+ 2"
3	Wilco Kelderman (NED)	Belkin Pro Cycling	+ 2"
4	Alejandro Valverde (ESP)	Movistar Team	+ 5"
5	Nacer Bouhanni (FRA)	FDJ.fr	+ 5"
6	Damiano Caruso (ITA)	Cannondale	+ 5"
7	Alberto Contador (ESP)	Tinkoff–Saxo	+ 5"
8	Robert Gesink (NED)	Belkin Pro Cycling	+ 5"
9	Dan Martin (IRL)	Garmin–Sharp	+ 5"
10	Gianluca Brambilla (ITA)	Omega Pharma–Quick-Step	+ 5"

General classification after stage 13

	Rider	Team	Time
1	Alberto Contador (ESP)	Tinkoff–Saxo	48h 59' 23"
2	Alejandro Valverde (ESP)	Movistar Team	+ 20"
3	Rigoberto Urán (COL)	Omega Pharma–Quick-Step	+ 1' 08"
4	Chris Froome (GBR)	Team Sky	+ 1' 20"
5	Joaquim Rodríguez (ESP)	Team Katusha	+ 1' 35"
6	Samuel Sánchez (ESP)	BMC Racing Team	+ 1' 52"
7	Fabio Aru (ITA)	Astana	+ 2' 13"
8	Winner Anacona (COL)	Lampre–Merida	+ 2' 37"
9	Robert Gesink (NED)	Belkin Pro Cycling	+ 2' 55"
10	Damiano Caruso (ITA)	Cannondale	+ 3' 51"

== Stage 14 ==
6 September 2014 — Santander to La Camperona, Valle de Sábero, 199 km (123.7 mi)

Stage 14 result

	Rider	Team	Time
1	Ryder Hesjedal (CAN)	Garmin–Sharp	5h 18' 10"
2	Oliver Zaugg (SUI)	Tinkoff–Saxo	+ 10"
3	Imanol Erviti (ESP)	Movistar Team	+ 30"
4	Alexandr Kolobnev (RUS)	Team Katusha	+ 39"
5	Louis Meintjes (RSA)	MTN–Qhubeka	+ 42"
6	Bart De Clercq (BEL)	Lotto–Belisol	+ 52"
7	Romain Sicard (FRA)	Team Europcar	+ 1' 44"
8	David Arroyo (ESP)	Caja Rural–Seguros RGA	+ 2' 02"
9	Carlos Verona (ESP)	Omega Pharma–Quick-Step	+ 2' 15"
10	Chris Froome (GBR)	Team Sky	+ 2' 36"

General classification after stage 14

	Rider	Team	Time
1	Alberto Contador (ESP)	Tinkoff–Saxo	54h 20' 16"
2	Alejandro Valverde (ESP)	Movistar Team	+ 42"
3	Chris Froome (GBR)	Team Sky	+ 1' 13"
4	Joaquim Rodríguez (ESP)	Team Katusha	+ 1' 29"
5	Rigoberto Urán (COL)	Omega Pharma–Quick-Step	+ 2' 07"
6	Fabio Aru (ITA)	Astana	+ 2' 15"
7	Samuel Sánchez (ESP)	BMC Racing Team	+ 3' 26"
8	Robert Gesink (NED)	Belkin Pro Cycling	+ 4' 14"
9	Winner Anacona (COL)	Lampre–Merida	+ 4' 36"
10	Dan Martin (IRL)	Garmin–Sharp	+ 4' 37"

== Stage 15 ==
7 September 2014 — Oviedo to Lagos de Covadonga, 149 km (92.6 mi)

Stage 15 result

	Rider	Team	Time
1	Przemysław Niemiec (POL)	Lampre–Merida	4h 11' 09"
2	Alejandro Valverde (ESP)	Movistar Team	+ 5"
3	Joaquim Rodríguez (ESP)	Team Katusha	+ 5"
4	Alberto Contador (ESP)	Tinkoff–Saxo	+ 10"
5	Fabio Aru (ITA)	Astana	+ 17"
6	Chris Froome (GBR)	Team Sky	+ 17"
7	Dan Martin (IRL)	Garmin–Sharp	+ 28"
8	Warren Barguil (FRA)	Giant–Shimano	+ 44"
9	Rigoberto Urán (COL)	Omega Pharma–Quick-Step	+ 1' 00"
10	Giampaolo Caruso (ITA)	Team Katusha	+ 1' 00"

General classification after stage 15

	Rider	Team	Time
1	Alberto Contador (ESP)	Tinkoff–Saxo	58h 31' 35"
2	Alejandro Valverde (ESP)	Movistar Team	+ 31"
3	Chris Froome (GBR)	Team Sky	+ 1' 20"
4	Joaquim Rodríguez (ESP)	Team Katusha	+ 1' 20"
5	Fabio Aru (ITA)	Astana	+ 2' 22"
6	Rigoberto Urán (COL)	Omega Pharma–Quick-Step	+ 2' 57"
7	Dan Martin (IRL)	Garmin–Sharp	+ 4' 55"
8	Samuel Sánchez (ESP)	BMC Racing Team	+ 5' 02"
9	Robert Gesink (NED)	Belkin Pro Cycling	+ 5' 11"
10	Warren Barguil (FRA)	Giant–Shimano	+ 6' 36"

== Stage 16 ==
8 September 2014 — San Martín del Rey Aurelio to La Farrapona, Lago de Somiedo, 158.8 km (98.7 mi)

Stage 16 result

	Rider	Team	Time
1	Alberto Contador (ESP)	Tinkoff–Saxo	4h 53' 35"
2	Chris Froome (GBR)	Team Sky	+ 15"
3	Alessandro De Marchi (ITA)	Cannondale	+ 50"
4	Alejandro Valverde (ESP)	Movistar Team	+ 55"
5	Joaquim Rodríguez (ESP)	Team Katusha	+ 59"
6	Fabio Aru (ITA)	Astana	+ 1' 06"
7	Dan Martin (IRL)	Garmin–Sharp	+ 1' 12"
8	Robert Gesink (NED)	Belkin Pro Cycling	+ 1' 22"
9	Samuel Sánchez (ESP)	BMC Racing Team	+ 1' 43"
10	Ryder Hesjedal (CAN)	Garmin–Sharp	+ 1' 48"

General classification after stage 16

	Rider	Team	Time
1	Alberto Contador (ESP)	Tinkoff–Saxo	63h 25' 00"
2	Alejandro Valverde (ESP)	Movistar Team	+ 1' 36"
3	Chris Froome (GBR)	Team Sky	+ 1' 39"
4	Joaquim Rodríguez (ESP)	Team Katusha	+ 2' 29"
5	Fabio Aru (ITA)	Astana	+ 3' 38"
6	Dan Martin (IRL)	Garmin–Sharp	+ 6' 17"
7	Robert Gesink (NED)	Belkin Pro Cycling	+ 6' 43"
8	Samuel Sánchez (ESP)	BMC Racing Team	+ 6' 55"
9	Warren Barguil (FRA)	Giant–Shimano	+ 8' 37"
10	Damiano Caruso (ITA)	Cannondale	+ 9' 10"

== Stage 17 ==
10 September 2014 — Ortigueira to A Coruña, 174 km (108.1 mi)

Stage 17 result

	Rider	Team	Time
1	John Degenkolb (GER)	Giant–Shimano	4h 26' 07"
2	Michael Matthews (AUS)	Orica–GreenEDGE	+ 0"
3	Fabian Cancellara (SWI)	Trek Factory Racing	+ 0"
4	Jasper Stuyven (BEL)	Trek Factory Racing	+ 0"
5	Roberto Ferrari (ITA)	Lampre–Merida	+ 0"
6	Koldo Fernández (ESP)	Garmin–Sharp	+ 0"
7	Geoffrey Soupe (FRA)	FDJ.fr	+ 0"
8	Danilo Wyss (SWI)	BMC Racing Team	+ 0"
9	Damiano Caruso (ITA)	Cannondale	+ 0"
10	Vicente Reynés (ESP)	IAM Cycling	+ 0"

General classification after stage 17

	Rider	Team	Time
1	Alberto Contador (ESP)	Tinkoff–Saxo	67h 51' 07"
2	Alejandro Valverde (ESP)	Movistar Team	+ 1' 36"
3	Chris Froome (GBR)	Team Sky	+ 1' 39"
4	Joaquim Rodríguez (ESP)	Team Katusha	+ 2' 29"
5	Fabio Aru (ITA)	Astana	+ 3' 38"
6	Dan Martin (IRL)	Garmin–Sharp	+ 6' 17"
7	Robert Gesink (NED)	Belkin Pro Cycling	+ 6' 43"
8	Samuel Sánchez (ESP)	BMC Racing Team	+ 6' 55"
9	Warren Barguil (FRA)	Giant–Shimano	+ 8' 37"
10	Damiano Caruso (ITA)	Cannondale	+ 9' 10"

== Stage 18 ==
11 September 2014 — A Estrada to Mont Castrove, Meis, 173.5 km (107.8 mi)

Stage 18 result

	Rider	Team	Time
1	Fabio Aru (ITA)	Astana	3h 47' 17"
2	Chris Froome (GBR)	Team Sky	+ 1"
3	Alejandro Valverde (ESP)	Movistar Team	+ 13"
4	Joaquim Rodríguez (ESP)	Team Katusha	+ 13"
5	Alberto Contador (ESP)	Tinkoff–Saxo	+ 13"
6	Samuel Sánchez (ESP)	BMC Racing Team	+ 17"
7	Daniel Navarro (ESP)	Cofidis	+ 33"
8	Daniel Moreno (ESP)	Team Katusha	+ 48"
9	Damiano Caruso (ITA)	Cannondale	+ 48"
10	Warren Barguil (FRA)	Giant–Shimano	+ 48"

General classification after stage 18

	Rider	Team	Time
1	Alberto Contador (ESP)	Tinkoff–Saxo	71h 38' 37"
2	Chris Froome (GBR)	Team Sky	+ 1' 19"
3	Alejandro Valverde (ESP)	Movistar Team	+ 1' 32"
4	Joaquim Rodríguez (ESP)	Team Katusha	+ 2' 29"
5	Fabio Aru (ITA)	Astana	+ 3' 15"
6	Dan Martin (IRL)	Garmin–Sharp	+ 6' 52"
7	Samuel Sánchez (ESP)	BMC Racing Team	+ 6' 59"
8	Warren Barguil (FRA)	Giant–Shimano	+ 9' 12"
9	Daniel Navarro (ESP)	Cofidis	+ 9' 44"
10	Damiano Caruso (ITA)	Cannondale	+ 9' 45"

== Stage 19 ==
12 September 2014 — Salvaterra de Miño to Cangas do Morrazo, 176.5 km (109.7 mi)

Stage 19 result

	Rider	Team	Time
1	Adam Hansen (AUS)	Lotto–Belisol	4h 21' 58"
2	John Degenkolb (GER)	Giant–Shimano	+ 5"
3	Filippo Pozzato (ITA)	Lampre–Merida	+ 5"
4	Yannick Martinez (FRA)	Team Europcar	+ 5"
5	Michael Matthews (AUS)	Orica–GreenEDGE	+ 5"
6	Geoffrey Soupe (FRA)	FDJ.fr	+ 5"
7	Paul Martens (GER)	Belkin Pro Cycling	+ 5"
8	Jasper Stuyven (BEL)	Trek Factory Racing	+ 5"
9	Romain Hardy (FRA)	Cofidis	+ 5"
10	Damiano Caruso (ITA)	Cannondale	+ 5"

General classification after stage 19

	Rider	Team	Time
1	Alberto Contador (ESP)	Tinkoff–Saxo	76h 00' 40"
2	Chris Froome (GBR)	Team Sky	+ 1' 19"
3	Alejandro Valverde (ESP)	Movistar Team	+ 1' 32"
4	Joaquim Rodríguez (ESP)	Team Katusha	+ 2' 29"
5	Fabio Aru (ITA)	Astana	+ 3' 15"
6	Dan Martin (IRL)	Garmin–Sharp	+ 6' 52"
7	Samuel Sánchez (ESP)	BMC Racing Team	+ 6' 59"
8	Warren Barguil (FRA)	Giant–Shimano	+ 9' 12"
9	Daniel Navarro (ESP)	Cofidis	+ 9' 44"
10	Damiano Caruso (ITA)	Cannondale	+ 9' 45"

== Stage 20 ==
13 September 2014 — Santo Estevo de Ribas de Sil to Puerto de Ancares, 163.8 km (101.8 mi)

Stage 20 result

	Rider	Team	Time
1	Alberto Contador (ESP)	Tinkoff–Saxo	5h 11' 43"
2	Chris Froome (GBR)	Team Sky	+ 16"
3	Alejandro Valverde (ESP)	Movistar Team	+ 57"
4	Joaquim Rodríguez (ESP)	Team Katusha	+ 1' 18"
5	Fabio Aru (ITA)	Astana	+ 1' 21"
6	Warren Barguil (FRA)	Giant–Shimano	+ 2' 51"
7	Giampaolo Caruso (ITA)	Team Katusha	+ 2' 55"
8	Samuel Sánchez (ESP)	BMC Racing Team	+ 2' 58"
9	Daniel Navarro (ESP)	Cofidis	+ 3' 15"
10	Damiano Caruso (ITA)	Cannondale	+ 3' 20"

General classification after stage 20

	Rider	Team	Time
1	Alberto Contador (ESP)	Tinkoff–Saxo	81h 12' 13"
2	Chris Froome (GBR)	Team Sky	+ 1' 37"
3	Alejandro Valverde (ESP)	Movistar Team	+ 2' 35"
4	Joaquim Rodríguez (ESP)	Team Katusha	+ 3' 57"
5	Fabio Aru (ITA)	Astana	+ 4' 46"
6	Samuel Sánchez (ESP)	BMC Racing Team	+ 10' 07"
7	Dan Martin (IRL)	Garmin–Sharp	+ 10' 24"
8	Warren Barguil (FRA)	Giant–Shimano	+ 12' 13"
9	Daniel Navarro (ESP)	Cofidis	+ 13' 09"
10	Damiano Caruso (ITA)	Cannondale	+ 13' 15"

== Stage 21 ==
14 September 2014 — Santiago de Compostela to Santiago de Compostela, 10 km (6.2 mi), individual time trial (ITT)

Stage 21 result

	Rider	Team	Time
1	Adriano Malori (ITA)	Movistar Team	11' 12"
2	Jesse Sergent (NZL)	Trek Factory Racing	+ 8"
3	Rohan Dennis (AUS)	BMC Racing Team	+ 9"
4	Vasil Kiryienka (BLR)	Team Sky	+ 17"
5	Jimmy Engoulvent (FRA)	Team Europcar	+ 17"
6	Sergey Chernetskiy (RUS)	Team Katusha	+ 18"
7	Maciej Bodnar (POL)	Cannondale	+ 18"
8	Alexey Lutsenko (KAZ)	Astana	+ 18"
9	Jasper Stuyven (BEL)	Trek Factory Racing	+ 18"
10	Damien Gaudin (FRA)	Ag2r–La Mondiale	+ 18"

Final General Classification

	Rider	Team	Time
1	Alberto Contador (ESP)	Tinkoff–Saxo	81h 25' 05"
2	Chris Froome (GBR)	Team Sky	+ 1' 10"
3	Alejandro Valverde (ESP)	Movistar Team	+ 1' 50"
4	Joaquim Rodríguez (ESP)	Team Katusha	+ 3' 25"
5	Fabio Aru (ITA)	Astana	+ 4' 48"
6	Samuel Sánchez (ESP)	BMC Racing Team	+ 9' 30"
7	Dan Martin (IRL)	Garmin–Sharp	+ 10' 38"
8	Warren Barguil (FRA)	Giant–Shimano	+ 11' 50"
9	Damiano Caruso (ITA)	Cannondale	+ 12' 50"
10	Daniel Navarro (ESP)	Cofidis	+ 13' 02"
