= 1995 Vuelta a Andalucía =

Race details
- Dates: 13–17 February 1995
- Stages: 5
- Distance: 823.6 km (511.8 mi)
- Winning time: 19h 35' 51"

Results
	Winner	Stefano Della Santa (ITA)
	Second	Francisco Cabello (ESP)
	Third	Mariano Rojas (ESP)

The 1995 Vuelta a Andalucía was the 41st edition of the Vuelta a Andalucía cycle race and was held from 13 February to 17 February 1995. The race started in Seville and finished in Granada. The race was won by Stefano Della Santa.

== General classification ==
Final general classification

Rank	Rider	Time
1	Stefano Della Santa (ITA)	19h 35' 51"
2	Francisco Cabello (ESP)	+ 0"
3	Mariano Rojas (ESP)	+ 17"
4	Marc Wauters (BEL)	+ 17"
5	Adriano Baffi (ITA)	+ 22"
6	Andrei Tchmil (UKR)	+ 22"
7	Erik Zabel (GER)	+ 22"
8	José Luis Santamaría (ESP)	+ 22"
9	Alexander Gontchenkov (RUS)	+ 22"
10	Ángel Edo (ESP)	+ 22"
