= 2014 Vuelta a España, Stage 1 to Stage 11 =

Cycling race stages

The 2014 Vuelta a España began on 23 August, with Stage 21 scheduled for 14 September. The 2014 edition of the cycle race began with the only team time trial stage of the race, in Jerez de la Frontera.

Legend (Note: Jerseys appearing in the table on the left of the page indicate those worn by the cyclist during the particular stage, while those appearing in the table on the right of the page indicate those awarded to the cyclist after the stage.)
A red jersey	Denotes the leader of the General classification	A bluedotted jersey	Denotes the leader of the Mountains classification
A green jersey	Denotes the leader of the Points classification	A white jersey	Denotes the leader of the Combination classification
A jersey with a white rider number on a red background	Denotes the rider designated as the day's most combative		

== Stage 1 ==
23 August 2014 — Jerez de la Frontera to Jerez de la Frontera, 12.6 km (7.8 mi), team time trial (TTT)

Stage 1 result

	Team	Time
1	Movistar Team	14' 13"
2	Cannondale	+ 6"
3	Orica–GreenEDGE	+ 6"
4	Trek Factory Racing	+ 9"
5	Omega Pharma–Quick-Step	+ 11"
6	Giant–Shimano	+ 16"
7	Tinkoff–Saxo	+ 19"
8	Belkin Pro Cycling	+ 19"
9	BMC Racing Team	+ 21"
10	Lampre–Merida	+ 25"

General classification after stage 1

	Rider	Team	Time
1	Jonathan Castroviejo (ESP)	Movistar Team	14' 13"
2	Alejandro Valverde (ESP)	Movistar Team	+ 0"
3	Andrey Amador (CRC)	Movistar Team	+ 0"
4	Imanol Erviti (ESP)	Movistar Team	+ 0"
5	Javier Moreno (ESP)	Movistar Team	+ 0"
6	Nairo Quintana (COL)	Movistar Team	+ 0"
7	Gorka Izagirre (ESP)	Movistar Team	+ 0"
8	Adriano Malori (ITA)	Movistar Team	+ 4"
9	José Herrada (ESP)	Movistar Team	+ 6"
10	Damiano Caruso (ITA)	Cannondale	+ 6"

== Stage 2 ==
24 August 2014 — Algeciras to San Fernando, 174.4 km (108.4 mi)

Stage 2 result

	Rider	Team	Time
1	Nacer Bouhanni (FRA)	FDJ.fr	4h 01' 30"
2	John Degenkolb (GER)	Giant–Shimano	+ 0"
3	Roberto Ferrari (ITA)	Lampre–Merida	+ 0"
4	Jasper Stuyven (BEL)	Trek Factory Racing	+ 0"
5	Francesco Lasca (ITA)	Caja Rural–Seguros RGA	+ 0"
6	Oscar Gatto (ITA)	Cannondale	+ 0"
7	Yauheni Hutarovich (BLR)	Ag2r–La Mondiale	+ 0"
8	Tom Boonen (BEL)	Omega Pharma–Quick-Step	+ 0"
9	Moreno Hofland (NED)	Belkin Pro Cycling	+ 0"
10	Matteo Pelucchi (ITA)	IAM Cycling	+ 0"

General classification after stage 2

	Rider	Team	Time
1	Alejandro Valverde (ESP)	Movistar Team	4h 15' 43"
2	Nairo Quintana (COL)	Movistar Team	+ 0"
3	Andrey Amador (CRC)	Movistar Team	+ 0"
4	Jonathan Castroviejo (ESP)	Movistar Team	+ 0"
5	Imanol Erviti (ESP)	Movistar Team	+ 0"
6	Gorka Izagirre (ESP)	Movistar Team	+ 0"
7	Oscar Gatto (ITA)	Cannondale	+ 6"
8	Michael Matthews (AUS)	Orica–GreenEDGE	+ 6"
9	Damiano Caruso (ITA)	Cannondale	+ 6"
10	Maciej Bodnar (POL)	Cannondale	+ 6"

== Stage 3 ==
25 August 2014 — Cádiz to Arcos de la Frontera, 188 km (116.8 mi)

Stage 3 result

	Rider	Team	Time
1	Michael Matthews (AUS)	Orica–GreenEDGE	5h 12' 14"
2	Dan Martin (IRL)	Garmin–Sharp	+ 0"
3	Joaquim Rodríguez (ESP)	Team Katusha	+ 0"
4	Wilco Kelderman (NED)	Belkin Pro Cycling	+ 0"
5	Paul Martens (GER)	Belkin Pro Cycling	+ 0"
6	Cadel Evans (AUS)	BMC Racing Team	+ 0"
7	Lloyd Mondory (FRA)	Ag2r–La Mondiale	+ 0"
8	Nacer Bouhanni (FRA)	FDJ.fr	+ 0"
9	Daniel Moreno (ESP)	Team Katusha	+ 0"
10	Chris Froome (GBR)	Team Sky	+ 0"

General classification after stage 3

	Rider	Team	Time
1	Michael Matthews (AUS)	Orica–GreenEDGE	9h 27' 53"
2	Nairo Quintana (COL)	Movistar Team	+ 4"
3	Alejandro Valverde (ESP)	Movistar Team	+ 11"
4	Rigoberto Urán (COL)	Omega Pharma–Quick-Step	+ 15"
5	Damiano Caruso (ITA)	Cannondale	+ 17"
6	Esteban Chaves (COL)	Orica–GreenEDGE	+ 17"
7	George Bennett (NZL)	Cannondale	+ 20"
8	Julián Arredondo (COL)	Trek Factory Racing	+ 20"
9	Haimar Zubeldia (ESP)	Trek Factory Racing	+ 20"
10	Gianluca Brambilla (ITA)	Omega Pharma–Quick-Step	+ 22"

== Stage 4 ==
26 August 2014 — Mairena del Alcor to Córdoba, 172.6 km (107.2 mi)

Stage 4 result

	Rider	Team	Time
1	John Degenkolb (GER)	Giant–Shimano	4h 02' 55"
2	Vicente Reynés (ESP)	IAM Cycling	+ 0"
3	Michael Matthews (AUS)	Orica–GreenEDGE	+ 0"
4	Damiano Caruso (ITA)	Cannondale	+ 0"
5	Dan Martin (IRL)	Garmin–Sharp	+ 0"
6	Alexandr Kolobnev (RUS)	Team Katusha	+ 0"
7	Lloyd Mondory (FRA)	Ag2r–La Mondiale	+ 0"
8	Valerio Conti (ITA)	Lampre–Merida	+ 0"
9	Bob Jungels (LUX)	Trek Factory Racing	+ 0"
10	Fabio Aru (ITA)	Astana	+ 0"

General classification after stage 4

	Rider	Team	Time
1	Michael Matthews (AUS)	Orica–GreenEDGE	13h 30' 44"
2	Nairo Quintana (COL)	Movistar Team	+ 8"
3	Alejandro Valverde (ESP)	Movistar Team	+ 15"
4	Rigoberto Urán (COL)	Omega Pharma–Quick-Step	+ 19"
5	Damiano Caruso (ITA)	Cannondale	+ 21"
6	Esteban Chaves (COL)	Orica–GreenEDGE	+ 21"
7	George Bennett (NZL)	Cannondale	+ 24"
8	Haimar Zubeldia (ESP)	Trek Factory Racing	+ 24"
9	Alberto Contador (ESP)	Tinkoff–Saxo	+ 27"
10	Wilco Kelderman (NED)	Belkin Pro Cycling	+ 27"

== Stage 5 ==
27 August 2014 — Priego de Córdoba to Ronda, 182.3 km (113.3 mi)

Stage 5 result

	Rider	Team	Time
1	John Degenkolb (GER)	Giant–Shimano	4h 41' 47"
2	Nacer Bouhanni (FRA)	FDJ.fr	+ 0"
3	Moreno Hofland (NED)	Belkin Pro Cycling	+ 0"
4	Jasper Stuyven (BEL)	Trek Factory Racing	+ 0"
5	Paul Martens (GER)	Belkin Pro Cycling	+ 0"
6	Lloyd Mondory (FRA)	Ag2r–La Mondiale	+ 0"
7	Philippe Gilbert (BEL)	BMC Racing Team	+ 0"
8	Vicente Reynés (ESP)	IAM Cycling	+ 0"
9	Kristian Sbaragli (ITA)	MTN–Qhubeka	+ 0"
10	Roberto Ferrari (ITA)	Lampre–Merida	+ 0"

General classification after stage 5

	Rider	Team	Time
1	Michael Matthews (AUS)	Orica–GreenEDGE	18h 12' 31"
2	Nairo Quintana (COL)	Movistar Team	+ 13"
3	Alejandro Valverde (ESP)	Movistar Team	+ 20"
4	Rigoberto Urán (COL)	Omega Pharma–Quick-Step	+ 24"
5	Damiano Caruso (ITA)	Cannondale	+ 26"
6	Esteban Chaves (COL)	Orica–GreenEDGE	+ 26"
7	Haimar Zubeldia (ESP)	Trek Factory Racing	+ 29"
8	Wilco Kelderman (NED)	Belkin Pro Cycling	+ 32"
9	Alberto Contador (ESP)	Tinkoff–Saxo	+ 32"
10	Robert Gesink (NED)	Belkin Pro Cycling	+ 32"

== Stage 6 ==
28 August 2014 — Benalmádena to La Zubia, 157.7 km (98.0 mi)

Stage 6 result

	Rider	Team	Time
1	Alejandro Valverde (ESP)	Movistar Team	4h 35' 27"
2	Chris Froome (GBR)	Team Sky	+ 0"
3	Alberto Contador (ESP)	Tinkoff–Saxo	+ 0"
4	Joaquim Rodríguez (ESP)	Team Katusha	+ 8"
5	Nairo Quintana (COL)	Movistar Team	+ 12"
6	Fabio Aru (ITA)	Astana	+ 18"
7	Esteban Chaves (COL)	Orica–GreenEDGE	+ 25"
8	Daniel Navarro (ESP)	Cofidis	+ 25"
9	Mikel Nieve (ESP)	Team Sky	+ 32"
10	Robert Gesink (NED)	Belkin Pro Cycling	+ 33"

General classification after stage 6

	Rider	Team	Time
1	Alejandro Valverde (ESP)	Movistar Team	22h 48' 08"
2	Nairo Quintana (COL)	Movistar Team	+ 15"
3	Alberto Contador (ESP)	Tinkoff–Saxo	+ 18"
4	Chris Froome (GBR)	Team Sky	+ 22"
5	Esteban Chaves (COL)	Orica–GreenEDGE	+ 41"
6	Joaquim Rodríguez (ESP)	Team Katusha	+ 45"
7	Robert Gesink (NED)	Belkin Pro Cycling	+ 55"
8	Fabio Aru (ITA)	Astana	+ 58"
9	Warren Barguil (FRA)	Giant–Shimano	+ 1' 02"
10	Wilco Kelderman (NED)	Belkin Pro Cycling	+ 1' 06"

== Stage 7 ==
29 August 2014 — Alhendín to Alcaudete, 165.4 km (102.8 mi)

Stage 7 result

	Rider	Team	Time
1	Alessandro De Marchi (ITA)	Cannondale	4h 01' 52"
2	Ryder Hesjedal (CAN)	Garmin–Sharp	+ 1' 34"
3	Hubert Dupont (FRA)	Ag2r–La Mondiale	+ 1' 35"
4	Johann Tschopp (SUI)	IAM Cycling	+ 1' 35"
5	Philippe Gilbert (BEL)	BMC Racing Team	+ 2' 17"
6	Dan Martin (IRL)	Garmin–Sharp	+ 2' 17"
7	Chris Froome (GBR)	Team Sky	+ 2' 18"
8	Gianluca Brambilla (ITA)	Omega Pharma–Quick-Step	+ 2' 20"
9	Alejandro Valverde (ESP)	Movistar Team	+ 2' 20"
10	Alberto Contador (ESP)	Tinkoff–Saxo	+ 2' 20"

General classification after stage 7

	Rider	Team	Time
1	Alejandro Valverde (ESP)	Movistar Team	26h 52' 20"
2	Nairo Quintana (COL)	Movistar Team	+ 15"
3	Alberto Contador (ESP)	Tinkoff–Saxo	+ 18"
4	Chris Froome (GBR)	Team Sky	+ 20"
5	Esteban Chaves (COL)	Orica–GreenEDGE	+ 41"
6	Joaquim Rodríguez (ESP)	Team Katusha	+ 45"
7	Robert Gesink (NED)	Belkin Pro Cycling	+ 55"
8	Fabio Aru (ITA)	Astana	+ 58"
9	Warren Barguil (FRA)	Giant–Shimano	+ 1' 02"
10	Wilco Kelderman (NED)	Belkin Pro Cycling	+ 1' 06"

== Stage 8 ==
30 August 2014 — Baeza to Albacete, 207.4 km (128.9 mi)

Stage 8 result

	Rider	Team	Time
1	Nacer Bouhanni (FRA)	FDJ.fr	4h 29' 00"
2	Michael Matthews (AUS)	Orica–GreenEDGE	+ 0"
3	Peter Sagan (SVK)	Cannondale	+ 0"
4	John Degenkolb (GER)	Giant–Shimano	+ 0"
5	Greg Henderson (NZL)	Lotto–Belisol	+ 0"
6	Robert Wagner (GER)	Belkin Pro Cycling	+ 0"
7	Kristian Sbaragli (ITA)	MTN–Qhubeka	+ 0"
8	Roberto Ferrari (ITA)	Lampre–Merida	+ 0"
9	Tom Boonen (BEL)	Omega Pharma–Quick-Step	+ 0"
10	Jasper Stuyven (BEL)	Trek Factory Racing	+ 0"

General classification after stage 8

	Rider	Team	Time
1	Alejandro Valverde (ESP)	Movistar Team	31h 21' 20"
2	Nairo Quintana (COL)	Movistar Team	+ 15"
3	Alberto Contador (ESP)	Tinkoff–Saxo	+ 18"
4	Chris Froome (GBR)	Team Sky	+ 20"
5	Esteban Chaves (COL)	Orica–GreenEDGE	+ 41"
6	Joaquim Rodríguez (ESP)	Team Katusha	+ 45"
7	Robert Gesink (NED)	Belkin Pro Cycling	+ 55"
8	Fabio Aru (ITA)	Astana	+ 58"
9	Warren Barguil (FRA)	Giant–Shimano	+ 1' 02"
10	Wilco Kelderman (NED)	Belkin Pro Cycling	+ 1' 06"

== Stage 9 ==
31 August 2014 — Carboneras de Guadazaón to Aramón Valdelinares, 181 km (112.5 mi)

Stage 9 result

	Rider	Team	Time
1	Winner Anacona (COL)	Lampre–Merida	4h 34' 14"
2	Alexey Lutsenko (KAZ)	Astana	+ 45"
3	Damiano Cunego (ITA)	Lampre–Merida	+ 50"
4	Javier Moreno (ESP)	Movistar Team	+ 1 '04"
5	Pello Bilbao (ESP)	Caja Rural–Seguros RGA	+ 1 '12"
6	Jérôme Coppel (FRA)	Cofidis	+ 1' 21"
7	Ryder Hesjedal (CAN)	Garmin–Sharp	+ 1' 33"
8	Adam Hansen (AUS)	Lotto–Belisol	+ 1' 45"
9	Bob Jungels (LUX)	Trek Factory Racing	+ 1' 49"
10	Fabio Felline (ITA)	Trek Factory Racing	+ 2' 08"

General classification after stage 9

	Rider	Team	Time
1	Nairo Quintana (COL)	Movistar Team	35h 58' 05"
2	Alberto Contador (ESP)	Tinkoff–Saxo	+ 3"
3	Alejandro Valverde (ESP)	Movistar Team	+ 8"
4	Winner Anacona (COL)	Lampre–Merida	+ 9"
5	Chris Froome (GBR)	Team Sky	+ 28"
6	Joaquim Rodríguez (ESP)	Team Katusha	+ 30"
7	Fabio Aru (ITA)	Astana	+ 1' 06"
8	Robert Gesink (NED)	Belkin Pro Cycling	+ 1' 19"
9	Rigoberto Urán (COL)	Omega Pharma–Quick-Step	+ 1' 26"
10	Warren Barguil (FRA)	Giant–Shimano	+ 1' 26"

== Stage 10 ==
2 September 2014 — Real Monasterio de Santa María de Veruela to Borja, 34.5 km (21.4 mi), individual time trial (ITT)

Stage 10 result

	Rider	Team	Time
1	Tony Martin (GER)	Omega Pharma–Quick-Step	47' 02"
2	Rigoberto Urán (COL)	Omega Pharma–Quick-Step	+ 15"
3	Fabian Cancellara (SUI)	Trek Factory Racing	+ 18"
4	Alberto Contador (ESP)	Tinkoff–Saxo	+ 39"
5	Samuel Sánchez (ESP)	BMC Racing Team	+ 48"
6	Cadel Evans (AUS)	BMC Racing Team	+ 49"
7	Vasil Kiryienka (BLR)	Team Sky	+ 57"
8	Alejandro Valverde (ESP)	Movistar Team	+ 1' 00"
9	Jesse Sergent (NZL)	Trek Factory Racing	+ 1' 13"
10	Chris Froome (GBR)	Team Sky	+ 1' 32"

General classification after stage 10

	Rider	Team	Time
1	Alberto Contador (ESP)	Tinkoff–Saxo	36h 45' 49"
2	Alejandro Valverde (ESP)	Movistar Team	+ 27"
3	Rigoberto Urán (COL)	Omega Pharma–Quick-Step	+ 59"
4	Winner Anacona (COL)	Lampre–Merida	+ 1' 12"
5	Chris Froome (GBR)	Team Sky	+ 1' 18"
6	Joaquim Rodríguez (ESP)	Team Katusha	+ 1' 37"
7	Samuel Sánchez (ESP)	BMC Racing Team	+ 1' 41"
8	Fabio Aru (ITA)	Astana	+ 2' 27"
9	Robert Gesink (NED)	Belkin Pro Cycling	+ 2' 38"
10	Damiano Caruso (ITA)	Cannondale	+ 2' 59"

== Stage 11 ==
3 September 2014 — Pamplona to Santuario de San Miguel de Aralar, 151 km (93.8 mi)

Stage 11 result

	Rider	Team	Time
1	Fabio Aru (ITA)	Astana	3h 41' 03"
2	Alejandro Valverde (ESP)	Movistar Team	+ 6"
3	Joaquim Rodríguez (ESP)	Team Katusha	+ 6"
4	Alberto Contador (ESP)	Tinkoff–Saxo	+ 6"
5	Chris Froome (GBR)	Team Sky	+ 6"
6	Rigoberto Urán (COL)	Omega Pharma–Quick-Step	+ 13"
7	Samuel Sánchez (ESP)	BMC Racing Team	+ 15"
8	Dan Martin (IRL)	Garmin–Sharp	+ 15"
9	Daniel Navarro (ESP)	Cofidis	+ 16"
10	Robert Gesink (NED)	Belkin Pro Cycling	+ 21"

General classification after stage 11

	Rider	Team	Time
1	Alberto Contador (ESP)	Tinkoff–Saxo	40h 26' 56"
2	Alejandro Valverde (ESP)	Movistar Team	+ 20"
3	Rigoberto Urán (COL)	Omega Pharma–Quick-Step	+ 1' 08"
4	Chris Froome (GBR)	Team Sky	+ 1' 20"
5	Joaquim Rodríguez (ESP)	Team Katusha	+ 1' 35"
6	Samuel Sánchez (ESP)	BMC Racing Team	+ 1' 52"
7	Fabio Aru (ITA)	Astana	+ 2' 13"
8	Winner Anacona (COL)	Lampre–Merida	+ 2' 22"
9	Robert Gesink (NED)	Belkin Pro Cycling	+ 2' 55"
10	Damiano Caruso (ITA)	Cannondale	+ 3' 51"
