= 1994 Vuelta a Andalucía =

Race details
- Dates: 8–13 February 1994
- Stages: 6
- Distance: 859.4 km (534.0 mi)
- Winning time: 24h 31' 14"

Results
	Winner	Stefano Della Santa (ITA)
	Second	Luc Roosen (BEL)
	Third	Francisco Cabello (ESP)

The 1994 Vuelta a Andalucía was the 40th edition of the Vuelta a Andalucía cycle race and was held on 8 February to 13 February 1994. The race started in Chiclana and finished in Granada. The race was won by Stefano Della Santa.

== General classification ==
Final general classification

Rank	Rider	Time
1	Stefano Della Santa (ITA)	24h 31' 14"
2	Luc Roosen (BEL)	+ 1' 07"
3	Francisco Cabello (ESP)	+ 1' 17"
4	Bo Hamburger (DEN)	+ 1' 43"
5	Viatcheslav Ekimov (RUS)	+ 1' 50"
6	Antonio Sánchez García (ESP)	+ 3' 05"
7	Ángel Edo (ESP)	+ 3' 26"
8	Manuel Fernández Ginés (ESP)	+ 3' 58"
9	Maarten den Bakker (NED)	+ 4' 17"
10	Miguel Ángel Martínez Torres (ESP)	+ 4' 28"
