= Zaidín (Granada) =

Coordinates: 37.1636°N 3.5950°W

El Zaidín is a district located in the South of the city of Granada. It is also known by the name of Zaidín-Vergeles. It is the most populated neighborhood. In the north lie the neighborhoods of Cervantes and Mirasierra, to the west lies Figares neighborhood, to the south lies Armilla and to the east lies La Zubia.

It is formed by the old neighbourhoods of Casillas Bajas, Santa Adela, Vergeles, Madrigales, La Cruzada, Ciudad Jardín, Divina Infantita, Parque de las Infantas and Alminares and Cruz de Lagos, Palacio de Deportes and Campus de la Salud. On February 27, 1994 El Zaidín twinned with a small town in Huesca (Aragón, Spain).

Zaidins location

== History ==
El Zaidín is located between two rivers Genil and Monachil, it owes its name to the Arabic term "Saedin" which can translate to "water arm" or "land between rivers". Recent archaeological finds in the Vergeles zone revealed remains of Roman villas of the 1st century.

El Alcázar Genil, thirteenth century Moorish palace, a once very extensive summer residence of the mother of Boabdil, goes unnoticed amongst the buildings. The first houses, aimed at the humble population, were built in 1953 across the Genil, about three kilometers from the center, the result of the municipal policy of expansion towards the Vega.

In the 60's, the neighbourhood grew immensely and without basic facilities. Urban excess is one of the main characteristic of El Zaidín.

== Present time ==
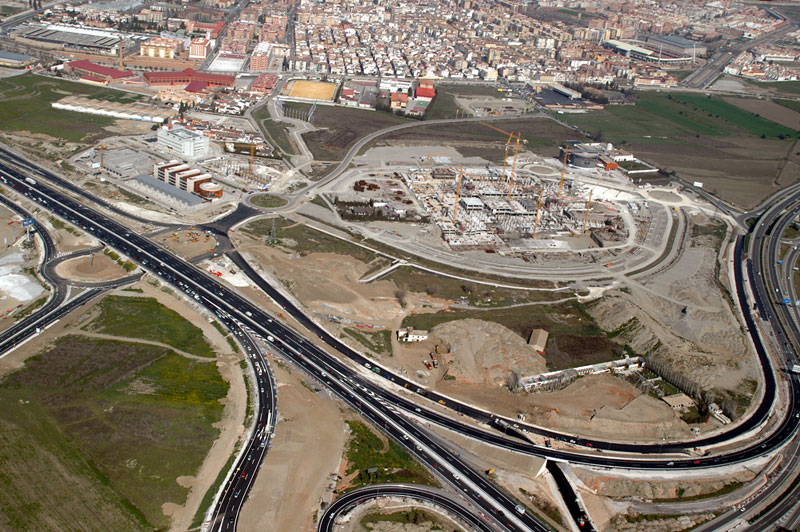
Health Campus

It is home to scientific centers such as the Astrophysics Institute of Andalusia and the Experimental Station of Zaidín, both under the Higher Council for Scientific Research (CSIC).

El Zaidín hosts the construction of buildings such as the New Los Carmenes Stadium, home to the Granada Football Club, 'Palacio de Deportes' - Granada Basketball Team, the Science Park, Palacio de Congresos and the Health Campus in Granada, located in the last acres of Vega in the city.

In 2026, the government of Granada invested €4.4 million for the rehabilitation of the Zaidin neighbourhood. The transformation will include the rehabilitation of 157 homes with improvements to energy efficiency, thermal insulation, roofing, accessibility, and the installation of solar panels. It also involves removing asbestos pipes, improving building ventilation, and upgrading the surrounding urban environment through new paving, expanded green areas, and better accessibility, aiming to create healthier, more sustainable, and energy-efficient homes.

== El Zaidín Rock ==
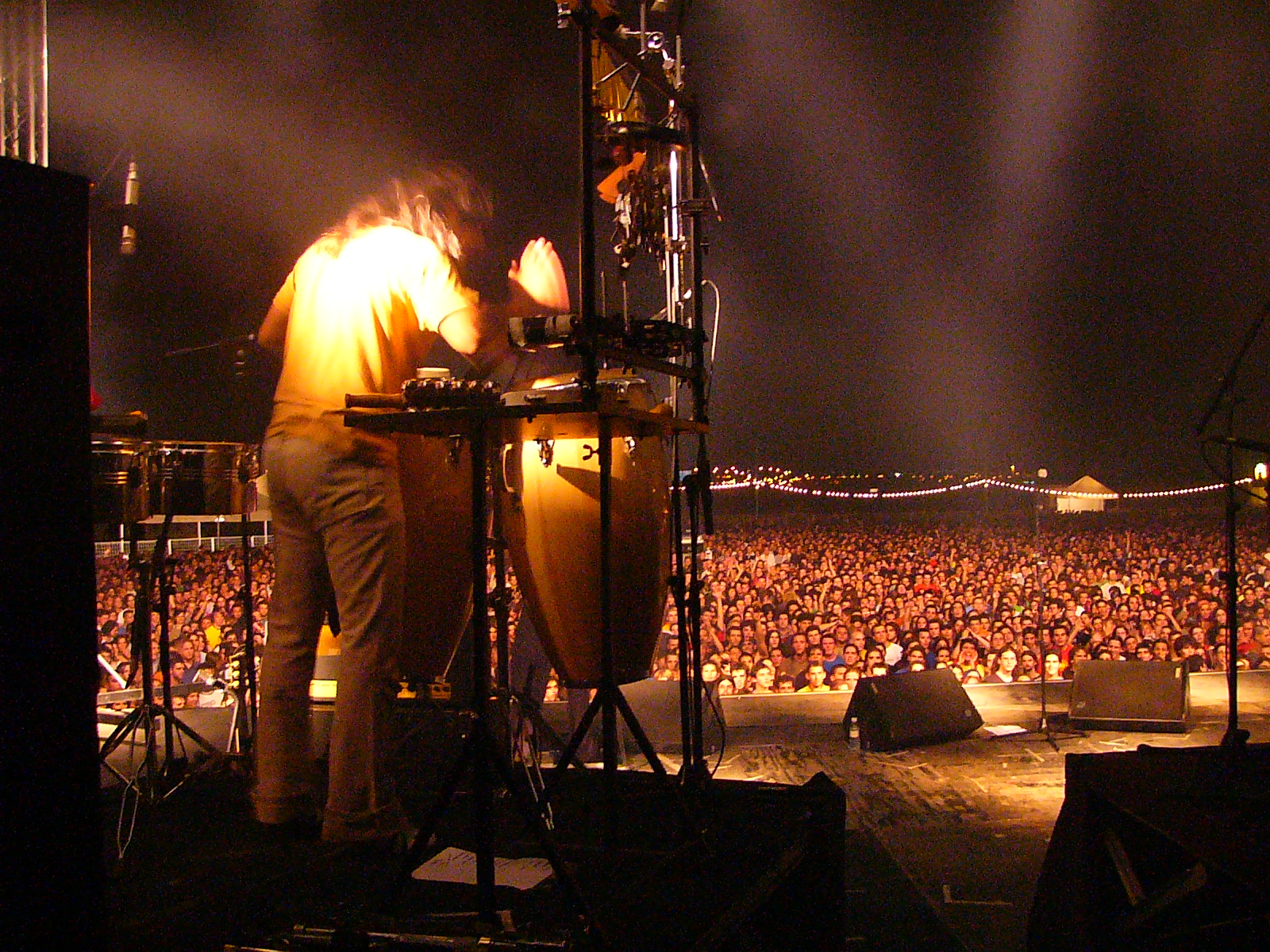
Zaidin Rock

Zaidin's Rock Festival or Zaidin Rock, is celebrated outdoors in different squares and streets of the neighbourhood and it marks the end of summer and the hosting of the university students. It was created in 1983 by the Asociación de Vecinos del Zaidín-Vergeles (Neighbourhood Association of Zaidín-Vergeles) and is organized by them since. Organising this gives them no profit. Since it is open to everyone and free it encourages the congregation of multitudes year after year. International and national Spanish performers have been on its stage.

== Places of interest ==
- Parish of Corpus Christi. Calle Garellano, nº3. Sede canónica de la Venerable Hermandad de caridad del Santísimo Cristo del Trabajo y Nuestra Señora de la luz.
- Parish of San Juan María Vianney. Calle Félix Rodríguez de la Fuente, 16.
- Nursing home of las Hermanitas de los Pobres. Calle Félix Rodríguez de la Fuente, 8.
- Parish of María Auxiliadora (Salesianos). Calle Félix Rodríguez de la Fuente, 2. Sede canónica de la Real Cofradía de penitencia y Hermandad Salesiana del Santísimo Cristo de la Redención y Nuestra Señora de la Salud.
- Parish of San Pío X. Calle San Pío X, 4.
- Parish of Nuestra Señora de los Dolores. Carretera de Armilla, 7B. Sede Canónica de la Venerable Hermandad de penitencia del Santísimo Cristo de la Lanzada y María Santísima de la Caridad.
- Parish of Santo Ángel Custodio. Calle Palencia, 30.
- Parish of San Miguel Arcángel. Calle Primavera, 27. Sede canónica de la venerable Hermandad de Nuestro Señor de la resurrección y Santa María del triunfo.
- Roundabout of Aviación Española (Also known as the helicopter roundabout), built to celebrate the centenary of the Spanish Air Force.
- Parque de las Ciencias. (Science Park)
