= 1997 Vuelta a Andalucía =

Race details
- Dates: 16–20 February 1997
- Stages: 5
- Distance: 721.2 km (448.1 mi)
- Winning time: 18h 30' 33"

Results
	Winner	Erik Zabel (GER)
	Second	Johan Museeuw (BEL)
	Third	David Etxebarria (ESP)

The 1997 Vuelta a Andalucía was the 43rd edition of the Vuelta a Andalucía (Ruta del Sol) cycle race and was held on 16 February to 20 February 1997. The race started in Seville and finished in Granada. The race was won by Erik Zabel.

== Teams ==
Seventeen teams started the race:

- ONCE
- Rabobank
- Mapei–GB
- Team Telekom
- Banesto
- U.S. Postal Service
- Lotto–Mobistar–Isoglass
- Foreldorado–Golff
- Kelme–Costa Blanca
- TVM–Farm Frites
- Palmans–Lystex
- Deportpublic–Cafés Toscaf
- Equipo Euskadi
- Cofidis
- Troiamarisco
- Saeco–Estro
- Ipso–Euroclean

== General classification ==
Final general classification

Rank	Rider	Time
1	Erik Zabel (GER)	18h 30' 33"
2	Johan Museeuw (BEL)	s.t.
3	David Etxebarria (ESP)	s.t.
4	Angelo Canzonieri (ITA)	s.t.
5	Bingen Fernández (ESP)	s.t.
6	Wilfried Peeters (BEL)	s.t.
7	Miguel Ángel Peña (ESP)	s.t.
8	Manuel Beltrán (ESP)	+ 17"
9	Santos González (ESP)	+ 41"
10	Viatcheslav Ekimov (RUS)	+ 47"
