= 1990 Vuelta a Andalucía =

Race details
- Dates: 6–11 February 1990
- Stages: 6
- Distance: 908 km (564.2 mi)
- Winning time: 23h 29' 39"

Results
	Winner	Eduardo Chozas (ESP)
	Second	Miguel Ángel Martínez Torres (ESP)
	Third	Pascal Lance (FRA)

The 1990 Vuelta a Andalucía was the 36th edition of the Vuelta a Andalucía cycle race and was held on 6 February to 11 February 1990. The race started in Marbella and finished in Granada. The race was won by Eduardo Chozas.

== General classification ==
Final general classification

Rank	Rider	Time
1	Eduardo Chozas (ESP)	23h 29' 39"
2	Miguel Ángel Martínez Torres (ESP)	+ 36"
3	Pascal Lance (FRA)	+ 36"
4	Robert Millar (GBR)	+ 1' 23"
5	Guy Nulens (BEL)	+ 1' 46"
6	Luc Roosen (BEL)	+ 1' 46"
7	Alex Pedersen (DEN)	+ 1' 46"
8	Francisco Espinosa (ESP)	+ 1' 46"
9	John Carlsen (DEN)	+ 1' 46"
10	Francisco San Roma Martin (ESP)	+ 1' 46"
