= Vuelta a Andalucía =

Spanish multi-day road cycling race

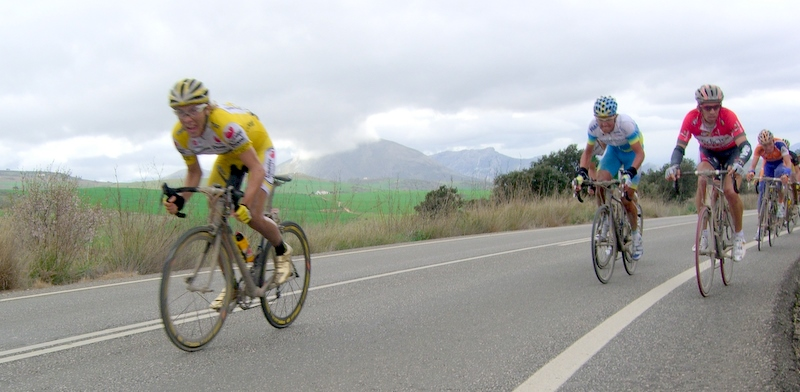
- Vuelta Andalucia

Race details
- Date: Mid-February
- Region: Andalucía
- English name: Tour of Andalusia
- Local name: Vuelta a Andalucía (in Spanish)
- Nickname(s): Ruta del Sol (in Spanish); Route of the Sun (in English)
- Discipline: Road
- Competition: UCI ProSeries 2.Pro
- Type: Stage-race (5 days)
- Web site: www.vueltaandalucia.es

History
- First edition: 1925
- Editions: 71 (as of 2025)
- First winner: Ricardo Montero (ESP)
- Most wins: Alejandro Valverde (ESP) (5 wins)
- Most recent: Pavel Sivakov (FRA)

History (women)
- First winner: Arlenis Sierra (CUB)
- Most wins: No repeat winners
- Most recent: Mavi García (ESP)

The Vuelta a Andalucía (Tour of Andalusia) or Ruta del Sol (Route of the Sun) is a regional Spanish road bicycle race first held in 1925. Since 2005, it has been a 2.1 category race on the UCI Europe Tour. The race became a part of the new UCI ProSeries in 2020. The nickname, Ruta del Sol, is in reference to the region's popular tourist coastline the Costa del Sol.

A women's edition of the race was established in 2022, as a category 2.1 UCI event.

== Winners ==
=== Men ===
Year	Country	Rider	Team
1925	Spain	Ricardo Montero	Real Unión Irun
1926– 1954	No race		
1955	Spain	José Gómez del Moral	individual
1956	Spain	Miguel Bover	Splendid–d'Alessandro
1957	Spain	Hortensio Vidaurreta	Real Unión-Palmera
1958	Spain	Gabriel Company	Faema–Guerra
1959	Spain	Miguel Pacheco	Faema–Guerra
1960	Spain	Gabriel Mas	Faema
1961	Spain	Angelino Soler	Faema
1962	Spain	José Antonio Momeñe	KAS
1963	Spain	Antonio Barrutia	KAS–Kaskol
1964	West Germany	Rudi Altig	Saint-Raphaël–Gitane–Dunlop
1965	Spain	José Segu	Tedi Montjuich
1966	Spain	Jesus Aranzabal	Fagor
1967	Spain	Ramón Mendiburu	Fagor
1968	Belgium	Antoon Houbrechts	Flandria–De Clerck
1969	Spain	Antonio Gómez del Moral	KAS–Kaskol
1970	Spain	José Gómez	KAS–Kaskol
1971	Belgium	Jean-Pierre Monseré	Flandria–Mars
1972	Netherlands	Jan Krekels	Goudsmit–Hoff
1973	Belgium	Georges Pintens	Rokado
1974	Belgium	Freddy Maertens	Carpenter–Confortluxe–Flandria
1975	Belgium	Freddy Maertens	Carpenter–Confortluxe–Flandria
1976	Netherlands	Gerrie Knetemann	TI–Raleigh
1977	West Germany	Dietrich Thurau	TI–Raleigh
1978	No race		
1979	West Germany	Dietrich Thurau	IJsboerke–Warncke
1980	Belgium	Daniel Willems	IJsboerke–Warncke
1981	Netherlands	Jos Schipper	HB Alarmsystemen
1982	Belgium	Marc Sergeant	Boule d'Or
1983	Spain	Eduardo Chozas	Zor–Gemeaz Cusin
1984	Spain	Julián Gorospe	Reynolds
1985	West Germany	Rolf Gölz	Del Tongo
1986	Netherlands	Steven Rooks	PDM–Ultima–Concorde
1987	West Germany	Rolf Gölz	Superconfex–Kwantum–Yoko–Colnago
1988	Belgium	Edwig Van Hooydonck	Superconfex–Yoko–Opel–Colnago
1989	Italy	Fabio Bordonali	Malvor–Sidi
1990	Spain	Eduardo Chozas	ONCE
1991	Spain	Roberto Lezaun	Banesto
1992	Spain	Miguel Martinez Torres	ONCE
1993	Spain	Julián Gorospe	Banesto
1994	Italy	Stefano Della Santa	Mapei–CLAS
1995	Italy	Stefano Della Santa	Mapei–GB–Latexco
1996	Australia	Neil Stephens	ONCE
1997	Germany	Erik Zabel	Team Telekom
1998	Spain	Marcelino García	ONCE
1999	Spain	Javier Pascual Rodríguez	Kelme
2000	Spain	Miguel Ángel Peña	ONCE–Deutsche Bank
2001	Netherlands	Erik Dekker	Rabobank
2002	Spain	Antonio Colom	Relax–Fuenlabrada
2003	Spain	Javier Pascual Llorente	Kelme–Costa Blanca
2004	Spain	Juan Carlos Domínguez	Saunier Duval–Prodir
2005	Spain	Francisco Cabello	Comunidad Valenciana-Elche
2006	Spain	Carlos García Quesada	Unibet.com
2007	Spain	Óscar Freire	Rabobank
2008	Spain	Pablo Lastras	Caisse d'Epargne
2009	Netherlands	Joost Posthuma	Rabobank
2010	Australia	Michael Rogers	Team HTC–Columbia
2011	Spain	Markel Irizar	Team RadioShack
2012	Spain	Alejandro Valverde	Movistar Team
2013	Spain	Alejandro Valverde	Movistar Team
2014	Spain	Alejandro Valverde	Movistar Team
2015	Great Britain	Chris Froome	Team Sky
2016	Spain	Alejandro Valverde	Movistar Team
2017	Spain	Alejandro Valverde	Movistar Team
2018	Belgium	Tim Wellens	Lotto–Soudal
2019	Denmark	Jakob Fuglsang	Astana
2020	Denmark	Jakob Fuglsang	Astana
2021	Colombia	Miguel Ángel López	Movistar Team
2022	Netherlands	Wout Poels	Team Bahrain Victorious
2023	Slovenia	Tadej Pogačar	UAE Team Emirates
2024		Not awarded	
2025	France	Pavel Sivakov	UAE Team Emirates XRG

==== Multiple winners ====
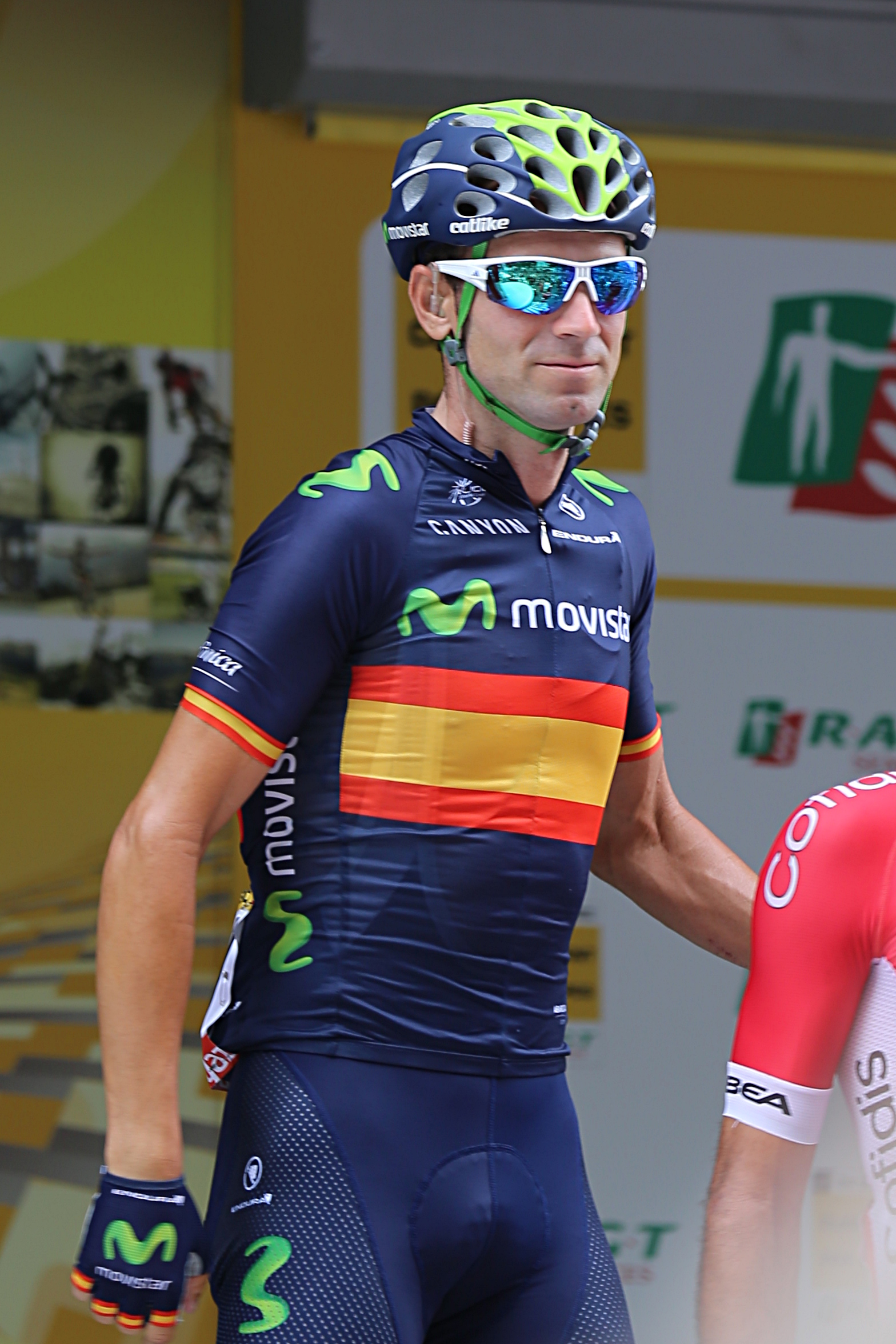
Alejandro Valverde (pictured at the 2015 Tour de France) has won the race five times.

Wins	Rider	Editions
5	Alejandro Valverde (ESP)	2012, 2013, 2014, 2016, 2017
2	Freddy Maertens (BEL)	1974, 1975
2	Dietrich Thurau (FRG)	1977, 1979
2	Rolf Gölz (FRG)	1985, 1987
2	Eduardo Chozas (ESP)	1983, 1990
2	Julián Gorospe (ESP)	1984, 1993
2	Stefano Della Santa (ITA)	1994, 1995
2	Jakob Fuglsang (DEN)	2019, 2020

==== Wins per country ====
Wins	Country
37	Spain
9	Belgium
7	Netherlands
6	Germany (including West Germany)
3	Italy
2	Australia; Denmark
1	Colombia; France; Great Britain; Slovenia

=== Women ===
Year	Country	Rider	Team
2022	Cuba	Arlenis Sierra	Movistar Team
2023	Norway	Katrine Aalerud	Movistar Team
2024	Spain	Mavi García	Liv AlUla Jayco
