= 1992 Vuelta a Andalucía =

Race details
- Dates: 2–9 February 1992
- Stages: 6
- Distance: 804 km (499.6 mi)
- Winning time: 21h 17' 30"

Results
	Winner	Miguel Ángel Martínez Torres (ESP)
	Second	Jesús Montoya (ESP)
	Third	Herminio Díaz Zabala (ESP)

The 1992 Vuelta a Andalucía was the 38th edition of the Vuelta a Andalucía cycle race and was held on 2 February to 9 February 1992. The race started in Chiclana and finished in Granada. The race was won by Miguel Ángel Martínez Torres.

== General classification ==
Final general classification

Rank	Rider	Time
1	Miguel Ángel Martínez Torres (ESP)	21h 17' 30"
2	Jesús Montoya (ESP)	+ 24"
3	Herminio Díaz Zabala (ESP)	+ 1' 28"
4	Viatcheslav Ekimov (RUS)	+ 1' 36"
5	Neil Stephens (AUS)	+ 1' 36"
6	Anselmo Fuerte (ESP)	+ 1' 36"
7	Jesús Blanco Villar (ESP)	+ 1' 40"
8	Peter Hilse (GER)	+ 1' 40"
9	Scott Sunderland (AUS)	+ 1' 40"
10	Bo Hamburger (DEN)	+ 1' 40"
