= 1991 Vuelta a Andalucía =

Race details
- Dates: 5–10 February 1991
- Stages: 6
- Distance: 1,040.3 km (646.4 mi)
- Winning time: 24h 21' 51"

Results
	Winner	Roberto Lezaun (ESP)
	Second	Jesper Skibby (DEN)
	Third	Adri van der Poel (NED)

The 1991 Vuelta a Andalucía was the 37th edition of the Vuelta a Andalucía cycle race and was held on 5 February to 10 February 1991. The race started in Chiclana and finished in Granada. The race was won by Roberto Lezaun.

== General classification ==
Final general classification

Rank	Rider	Time
1	Roberto Lezaun (ESP)	24h 21' 51"
2	Jesper Skibby (DEN)	+ 0"
3	Adri van der Poel (NED)	+ 3"
4	Andreas Kappes (GER)	+ 3"
5	Charly Mottet (FRA)	+ 3"
6	Marc Sergeant (BEL)	+ 3"
7	Per Pedersen (DEN)	+ 3"
8	Frankie Andreu (USA)	+ 3"
9	Federico Echave (ESP)	+ 3"
10	Julio César Cadena (COL)	+ 3"
