= 2000 Vuelta a Andalucía =

Race details
- Dates: 13–17 February 2000
- Stages: 5
- Distance: 794.5 km (493.7 mi)
- Winning time: 20h 58' 08"

Results
	Winner	Miguel Ángel Peña (ESP)
	Second	Francisco Cabello (ESP)
	Third	Aitor Garmendia (ESP)

The 2000 Vuelta a Andalucía was the 46th edition of the Vuelta a Andalucía (Ruta del Sol) cycle race and was held on 13 February to 17 February 2000. The race started in Almería and finished in Granada. The race was won by Miguel Ángel Peña.

== Teams ==
Nineteen teams of up to eight riders started the race:

- Kelme–Costa Blanca
- Vitalicio Seguros
- ONCE–Deutsche Bank
- Lotto–Adecco
- Euskaltel–Euskadi
- U.S. Postal Service
- Rabobank
- Team Telekom
- Farm Frites
- Mapei–Quick-Step
- Colchon Relax–Fuenlabrada
- Memory Card–Jack & Jones
- Mercatone Uno–Albacom
- Palmans–Ideal
- Banesto
- Nürnberger
- Festina
- Cofidis
- Costa de Almería

== General classification ==
Final general classification

Rank	Rider	Time
1	Miguel Ángel Peña (ESP)	20h 58' 08"
2	Francisco Cabello (ESP)	+ 22"
3	Aitor Garmendia (ESP)	+ 26"
4	Peter Farazijn (BEL)	+ 27"
5	José Luis Rebollo (ESP)	+ 33"
6	David Etxebarria (ESP)	+ 37"
7	Frank Vandenbroucke (BEL)	s.t.
8	Félix Manuel García (ESP)	+ 48"
9	Juan Miguel Mercado (ESP)	s.t.
10	Michele Coppolillo (ITA)	s.t.
