= Marcelino García (cyclist) =

Spanish cyclist

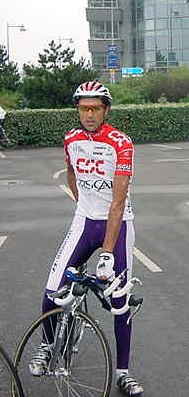
- CSC Team Post Card

Personal information
- Full name: Marcelino García Alonso
- Born: 27 February 1971 (age 55) Oviedo, Asturias, Spain

Cycling career
- Sport: Cycling
- Discipline: Road
- Role: Retired
- Rider type: Climber & Domestique

Professional teams
- 1993–2000: ONCE
- 2001–2002: CSC–Tiscali
- 2003: Labarca 2–Cafés Baqué

Major wins
- Critérium International (1997); Vuelta a Andalucía (1998)

Marcelino García Alonso (born 1971 in Oviedo, Asturias) is a Spanish former professional road cyclist. He rode for the Danish professional cycling team, CSC–Tiscali, which he joined coming from Spanish Team ONCE. He rode for the Danish team until 2002, where he went to another Spanish team, Labarca 2–Cafés Baqué. Since retiring, he works as a Tour Guide during the Grand Tours in the summer months throughout Europe.

== Major results ==
1995
8th Overall Vuelta a los Valles Mineros
1996
3rd Overall Euskal Bizikleta

1st Stage 3

3rd Overall GP Tell
3rd Overall Vuelta Asturias
7th Overall Volta a Catalunya
9th Overall Tour de l'Avenir
1997
1st Overall Critérium International

1st Stage 2

1998
1st Overall Vuelta a Andalucía

1st Stage 3

2000
5th Overall Vuelta Asturias
2001
1st Stage 3 Hessen Rundfahrt
