= 2003 Vuelta a Andalucía =

Race details
- Dates: 16–20 February 2003
- Stages: 5
- Distance: 863.2 km (536.4 mi)
- Winning time: 21h 58' 34"

Results
	Winner	Javier Pascual Llorente (ESP)
	Second	Davide Rebellin (ITA)
	Third	Alejandro Valverde (ESP)

The 2003 Vuelta a Andalucía was the 49th edition of the Vuelta a Andalucía (Ruta del Sol) cycle race and was held on 16 February to 20 February 2003. The race started in Córdoba and finished in Benalmádena. The race was won by Javier Pascual Llorente.

== Teams ==
Sixteen teams of eight riders started the race:

- Colchon Relax–Fuenlabrada
- iBanesto.com
- Team Telekom
- Rabobank
- Team Coast
- AG2R Prévoyance
- Labarca 2–Café Baqué
- Euskaltel–Euskadi
- ONCE–Eroski
- Kelme–Costa Blanca
- Paternina–Costa de Almería
- Alessio
- Phonak
- Quick-Step–Davitamon
- Lotto–Domo
- Gerolsteiner

== General classification ==
Final general classification

Rank	Rider	Time
1	Javier Pascual Llorente (ESP)	21h 58' 34"
2	Davide Rebellin (ITA)	+ 8"
3	Alejandro Valverde (ESP)	+ 9"
4	Giampaolo Caruso (ITA)	s.t.
5	Iván Gutiérrez (ESP)	+ 16"
6	Luca Paolini (ITA)	+ 18"
7	Francisco Cabello (ESP)	s.t.
8	Andrea Noè (ITA)	+ 21"
9	Mikel Zarrabeitia (ESP)	s.t.
10	Javier Rodríguez (ESP)	+ 27"
