= Javier Pascual Rodríguez =

Spanish cyclist

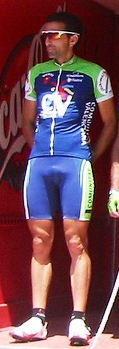

Personal information
- Full name: Javier Pascual Rodríguez
- Born: 14 November 1971 (age 54) La Virgen del Camino, Valverde de la Virgen, Spain

Cycling career
- Sport: Cycling
- Current team: Retired
- Discipline: Road
- Role: Rider

Professional teams
- 1995–1996: Santa Clara
- 1997–2000: Kelme–Costa Blanca
- 2000–2003: Banesto
- 2004–2006: Comunidad Valenciana–Kelme

Major wins
- Vuelta a Andalucía (1999); Stage Vuelta a España (2004)

Javier Pascual Rodríguez (born 14 November 1971) is a Spanish former cyclist.

== Major results ==
1998
1st Stage 5 Vuelta a Colombia
1999
1st Overall Vuelta a Andalucía
2nd Overall Vuelta a Murcia

1st Stage 2

3rd Overall Vuelta a la Comunidad Valenciana
2000
2nd Overall Setmana Catalana de Ciclisme
5th Overall Paris–Nice
2001
1st Stage 3 Vuelta a Castilla y León
2002
3rd Overall Vuelta a Andalucía

1st Stage 4

5th Klasika Primavera
5th Overall Vuelta a la Comunidad Valenciana
10th Trofeo Luis Puig
2003
6th Züri-Metzgete
7th Liège–Bastogne–Liège
10th Overall Vuelta a Andalucía
2004
1st Stage 18 Vuelta a España
3rd Circuito de Getxo
10th Overall Vuelta a Murcia
2005
1st Overall Vuelta a La Rioja

1st Stage 1

1st GP Miguel Indurain
3rd Gran Premio de Llodio
4th GP Villafranca de Ordizia

=== Grand Tour general classification results timeline ===
Grand Tour	1995	1996	1997	1998	1999	2000	2001	2002	2003	2004	2005
Giro d'Italia	—	—	—	—	—	—	—	—	—	—	—
Tour de France	—	—	37	—	33	—	41	95	—	—	—
Vuelta a España	96	48	—	—	—	—	—	—	—	53	42

Legend
DSQ	Disqualified
DNF	Did not finish
