= 1999 Vuelta a Andalucía =

Race details
- Dates: 14–18 February 1999
- Stages: 5
- Distance: 784.2 km (487.3 mi)
- Winning time: 20h 15' 34"

Results
| | Winner | Javier Pascual Rodríguez (ESP) |
| | Second | Santiago Botero (COL) |
| | Third | Santiago Blanco (ESP) |

The 1999 Vuelta a Andalucía was the 45th edition of the Vuelta a Andalucía (Ruta del Sol) cycle race and was held on 14 February to 18 February 1999. The race started in Almeria and finished in Granada. The race was won by Javier Pascual Rodríguez.

== Teams ==
Nineteen teams of up to eight riders started the race:

- ONCE–Deutsche Bank
- Vitalicio Seguros
- Kelme–Costa Blanca
- Lotto–Mobistar
- Euskaltel–Euskadi
- U.S. Postal Service
- Rabobank
- Team Telekom
- TVM–Farm Frites
- Mapei–Quick-Step
- Fuenlabrada
- Cofidis
- Nürnberger
- Palmans–Ideal
- Banesto
- Casino–Ag2r Prévoyance
- Festina–Lotus
- Team Cologne
- Amica Chips–Costa de Almeria

== General classification ==
Final general classification

| Rank | Rider | Time |
|---|---|---|
| 1 | Javier Pascual Rodríguez (ESP) | 20h 15' 34" |
| 2 | Santiago Botero (COL) | + 2" |
| 3 | Santiago Blanco (ESP) | + 1' 10" |
| 4 | Claus Michael Møller (DEN) | + 1' 12" |
| 5 | Francisco Mancebo (ESP) | s.t. |
| 6 | Steve De Wolf (BEL) | + 1' 20" |
| 7 | Jo Planckaert (BEL) | + 1' 21" |
| 8 | José Luis Rebollo (ESP) | s.t. |
| 9 | Erik Dekker (NED) | + 1' 23" |
| 10 | Unai Osa (ESP) | s.t. |
