= Vuelta a Mallorca =

Spanish road cycling race

Race details
- Date: Early February
- Region: Mallorca, Spain
- English name: Tour of Majorca
- Local name(s): Volta a Mallorca (in Catalan); Vuelta a Mallorca (in Spanish)
- Discipline: Road
- Competition: UCI Europe Tour
- Type: One-day
- Web site: vueltamallorca.com

History
- First edition: 1992
- Editions: 33 (as of 2024)
- First winner: Javier Murguialday (ESP)
- Most wins: Francisco Cabello (ESP) (3 wins)
- Most recent: Antonio Colom (ESP) (2009, no overall winner classification since)

The Challenge Vuelta Ciclista a Mallorca (English: Tour of Majorca, Catalan: Challenge Volta Ciclista a Mallorca) is a series of four (five until 2012) professional one day road bicycle races held on the Spanish island of Mallorca in late January or early February. The event is used as an early season preparatory event by many of the top teams in readiness for the bigger races later in the season. The five races are ranked 1.1 on the UCI Europe Tour.

Although the race styles itself as the "Tour of Majorca" it has never been allowed to be classed as a multi day stage race by the sports governing body the Union Cycliste Internationale (UCI) because the race rules allows riders not to participate on certain days. However, there is an unofficial overall classification winner taken on total time over five days. This laid back attitude by the race organisers makes the race popular with team managers who can bring a large squad (sometimes as many as 20 riders) and interchange them over the five days. Apart from the overall classification, there are the usual Mountains, Points and Sprints competitions associated with any stage race. There is also a competition for the top Mallorca-based rider; in the past this has been won by Vicente Reynès, Antonio Colóm and Antonio Tauler.

The first day of racing is the Trofeo Mallorca, a criterium around the streets of Palma. The second day is the Trofeo Cala Millor, sometimes called the Trofeo Alcúdia. These two opening days are run over a fairly flat course and result in a sprint finish. The Trofeo Pollença (day three) and Trofeo Sóller (day four) are contested over a more hilly course using the climbs of the Col de Sóller (501 metres) and the Col de Puig Major (850 metres) amongst others on the route. These two hilly days usually decide the outcome of the unofficial overall classification over the five days. The final days racing is the Trofeo Calvià which takes place on an undulating course over a series of small climbs.

Top class riders such as Laurent Jalabert, Alex Zülle and Alejandro Valverde have won the overall classification at the Vuelta a Mallorca; Spanish rider Francesco Cabello, who rode for the Kelme team throughout his career, holds the record for the most victories, taking three overall victories in Mallorca in 1996, 2000 and 2002. In 2004 Colóm became the first rider who was a native of the island of Mallorca to take the overall classification.

The Vuelta a Mallorca receives heavy sponsorship from Tourism section of the local Mallorcan government (Govern de la Illes Balears). The race was first held in 1992 and for the first three years was just open to Spanish teams, however in 1995 foreign squads were invited for the first time with teams such as Telekom and TVM attending. In 1998 Léon van Bon of the Dutch Rabobank squad became the first overall winner riding for a non Spanish team.

In 2026 the Challenge featured a team time trial for the first time in its 35-year history. The Trofeo Ses Salines run on Thursday 29 January was a 24 km squad test between Ses Salines and Colònia de Sant Jordi and was won by Red Bull–Bora–Hansgrohe.

== General classification winners ==
Year	Country	Rider	Team
1992	Spain	Javier Murguialday	Lotus–Festina
1993	France	Laurent Jalabert	ONCE
1994	Spain	David Garcia Marquina	Banesto
1995	Switzerland	Alex Zülle	ONCE
1996	Spain	Francisco Cabello	Kelme–Artiach
1997	France	Laurent Jalabert	ONCE
1998	Netherlands	Léon van Bon	Rabobank
1999	Spain	José Luis Rebollo	ONCE–Deutsche Bank
2000	Spain	Francisco Cabello	Kelme–Costa Blanca
2001	Australia	Mathew Hayman	Rabobank
2002	Spain	Francisco Cabello	Kelme–Costa Blanca
2003	Spain	Alejandro Valverde	Kelme–Costa Blanca
2004	Spain	Antonio Colom	Illes Balears–Banesto
2005	Spain	Alejandro Valverde	Illes Balears–Banesto
2006	Spain	David Bernabeu	Comunidad Valenciana
2007	Spain	Luis León Sánchez	Caisse d'Epargne
2008	Belgium	Philippe Gilbert	Française des Jeux
2009	Spain	Antonio Colom	Team Katusha

== Individual Race Winners ==
Year	Trofeo Palma de Mallorca	Trofeo Alcúdia	Trofeo Calvià	Trofeo Manacor	Trofeo Sóller
1992	Kenneth Weltz (DEN)	Alfonso Gutiérrez (ESP)	Neil Stephens (AUS)	Alfonso Gutiérrez (ESP)	Juan Carlos González (ESP)
1993	Asiat Saitov (RUS)	Alfonso Gutiérrez (ESP)	Federico Echave (ESP)	Laurent Jalabert (FRA)	Laurent Jalabert (FRA)
1994	Joan Llaneras (ESP)	Asier Guenetxea (ESP)	Alfonso Gutiérrez (ESP)	José Ramón Uriarte (ESP)	Ángel Edo (ESP)
1995	Adriano Baffi (ITA)	Jeroen Blijlevens (NED)	Beat Zberg (SUI)	Samuele Schiavina (ITA)	Laurent Jalabert (FRA)
1996	Jeroen Blijlevens (NED)	Goder De Leeuw (NED)	Francisco Cabello (ESP)	Federico Colonna (ITA)	Francisco Cabello (ESP)
1997	Erik Zabel (GER)	Peter Van Petegem (BEL)	Tom Steels (BEL)	Hendrik Van Dijck (BEL)	Laurent Jalabert (FRA)
1998	Erik Zabel (GER)	Jeremy Hunt (GBR)	Tom Steels (BEL)	Elio Aggiano (ITA)	Tom Steels (BEL)
1999	Jeroen Blijlevens (NED)	Claus Michael Møller (DEN)	Francisco Cabello (ESP)	Mario Cipollini (ITA)	Mario Cipollini (ITA)
2000	Óscar Freire (ESP)	Robbie McEwen (AUS)	Elio Aggiano (ITA)	Paolo Bettini (ITA)	Francisco Cabello (ESP)
2001	Erik Zabel (GER)	Michael Boogerd (NED)	Robbie McEwen (AUS)	Erik Zabel (GER)	Mathew Hayman (AUS)
2002	Isaac Gálvez (ESP)	Igor Flores (ESP)	Erik Dekker (NED)	Óscar Freire (ESP)	Óscar Freire (ESP)
2003	Isaac Gálvez (ESP)	Allan Davis (AUS)	Remmert Wielinga (NED)	Isaac Gálvez (ESP)	Alexandre Usov (BLR)
2004	Allan Davis (AUS)	Óscar Freire (ESP)	Unai Etxebarria (VEN)	Allan Davis (AUS)	Alejandro Valverde (ESP)
2005	Óscar Freire (ESP)	Óscar Freire (ESP)	Antonio Colom (ESP)	Alejandro Valverde (ESP)	Alejandro Valverde (ESP)
Year	Trofeo Palma de Mallorca	Trofeo Cala Millor	Trofeo Calvià	Trofeo Pollença	Trofeo Sóller
2006	Isaac Gálvez (ESP)	Isaac Gálvez (ESP)	David Kopp (GER)	David Bernabeu (ESP)	Paolo Bettini (ITA)
2007	Óscar Freire (ESP)	Vicente Reynès (ESP)	Unai Etxebarria (VEN)	Thomas Dekker (NED)	Antonio Colom (ESP)
2008	Philippe Gilbert (BEL)	Graeme Brown (AUS)	Gert Steegmans (BEL)	José Joaquín Rojas (ESP)	Philippe Gilbert (BEL)
Year	Trofeo Palma de Mallorca	Trofeo Cala Millor	Trofeo Calvià	Trofeo Pollença	Trofeo Inca
2009	Gert Steegmans (BEL)	Robbie McEwen (AUS)	Gerald Ciolek (GER)	Daniele Bennati (ITA)	Antonio Colom (ESP)
Year	Trofeo Palma de Mallorca	Trofeo Cala Millor	Trofeo Deià	Trofeo Magaluf-Palmanova	Trofeo Inca
2010	Robbie McEwen (AUS)	Óscar Freire (ESP)	Rui Costa (POR)	André Greipel (GER)	Linus Gerdemann (GER)
2011	No winner (Note: The race, won by Tyler Farrar, is not officially recognized by the UCI because of a large protest from riders.)	Tyler Farrar (USA)	José Joaquín Rojas (ESP)	Murilo Fischer (BRA)	Ben Hermans (BEL)
Year	Trofeo Palma de Mallorca	Trofeo Migjorn	Trofeo Deià	Trofeo Pollença	Trofeo Serra de Tramuntana
2012	Andrew Fenn (GBR)	Andrew Fenn (GBR)	Lars Petter Nordhaug (NOR)	Not raced (Note: Event reduced to 4 single-day races in 2012 due to financial problems.)	Cancelled (Note: Trofeo Serra de Tramuntana cancelled due to adverse weather conditions.)
Year	Trofeo Palma de Mallorca	Trofeo Campos	Trofeo Deià	Trofeo Platja de Muro	Trofeo Serra de Tramuntana
2013	Kenny Dehaes (BEL)	Leigh Howard (AUS)	Not raced	Leigh Howard (AUS)	Alejandro Valverde (ESP)
Year	Trofeo Palma	Trofeo Ses Salines	Trofeo Deià	Trofeo Muro-Port d'Alcúdia	Trofeo Serra de Tramuntana
2014	Sacha Modolo (ITA)	Sacha Modolo (ITA)	Not raced	Gianni Meersman (BEL)	Michał Kwiatkowski (POL)
Year	Trofeo Santanyi-Ses Salines-Campos	Trofeo Andratx – Mirador d'Es Colomer	Trofeo Serra de Tramuntana	Trofeo Playa de Palma	Not raced
2015	Matteo Pelucchi (ITA)	Steve Cummings (GBR)	Alejandro Valverde (ESP)	Matteo Pelucchi (ITA)	Not raced
Year	Trofeo Felanitx-Ses Salines-Campos-Porreres	Trofeo Pollenca-Port de Andratx	Trofeo Serra de Tramuntana	Trofeo Playa de Palma	Not raced
2016	André Greipel (GER)	Gianluca Brambilla (ITA)	Fabian Cancellara (SUI)	André Greipel (GER)	Not raced
Year	Trofeo Porreres-Felanitx-Ses Salines-Campos	Trofeo Andratx – Mirador d'Es Colomer	Trofeo Serra de Tramuntana	Trofeo Playa de Palma	Not raced
2017	André Greipel (GER)	Tim Wellens (BEL)	Tim Wellens (BEL)	Daniel McLay (GBR)	Not raced
Year	Trofeo Porreres-Felanitx-Ses Salines-Campos	Trofeo Andratx – Mirador d'Es Colomer	Trofeo Serra de Tramuntana	Trofeo Playa de Palma	Not raced
2018	John Degenkolb (GER)	Toms Skujiņš (LAT)	Tim Wellens (BEL)	John Degenkolb (GER)	Not raced
Year	Trofeo Ses Salines-Campos-Porreres-Felanitx	Trofeo Andratx Lloseta	Trofeo de Tramuntana Soller-Deia	Trofeo Palma	Not raced
2019	Jesús Herrada (ESP)	Emanuel Buchmann (GER)	Tim Wellens (BEL)	Marcel Kittel (GER)	Not raced
Year	Trofeo Felanitx-Ses Salines-Campos-Porreres	Trofeo Serra de Tramuntana	Trofeo Pollença – Port d'Andratx	Trofeo de Playa de Palma – Palma	Not raced
2020	Matteo Moschetti (ITA)	Emanuel Buchmann (GER)	Marc Soler (ESP)	Matteo Moschetti (ITA)	Not raced
Year	Trofeo Calvià	Trofeo Serra de Tramuntana	Trofeo Andratx – Mirador d'Es Colomer (Puerto Pollença)	Trofeo Alcúdia – Port d'Alcúdia	Not raced
2021	Ryan Gibbons (RSA)	Jesús Herrada (ESP)	Winner Anacona (COL)	André Greipel (GER)	Not raced
Year	Trofeo Calvià	Trofeo Alcúdia – Port d'Alcúdia	Trofeo Serra de Tramuntana	Trofeo Pollença – Port d'Andratx	Trofeo Playa de Palma
2022	Brandon McNulty (USA)	Biniam Girmay (ERI)	Tim Wellens (BEL)	Alejandro Valverde (ESP)	Arnaud de Lie (BEL)
Year	Trofeo Calvià	Trofeo Ses Salines - Alcúdia	Trofeo Andratx – Mirador d'Es Colomer (Puerto Pollença)	Trofeo Serra de Tramuntana	Trofeo Palma
2023	Rui Costa (POR)	Marijn van den Berg (NED)	Kobe Goossens (BEL)	Kobe Goossens (BEL)	Ethan Vernon (GBR)
Year	Trofeo Calvià	Trofeo Ses Salines-Felanitx	Trofeo Serra Tramuntana	Trofeo Pollença - Port d'Andratx	Trofeo Palma
2024	Simon Carr (GBR)	Paul Magnier (FRA)	Lennert Van Eetvelt (BEL)	Pelayo Sánchez (ESP)	Gerben Thijssen (BEL)
Year	Trofeo Calvià	Trofeo Ses Salines	Trofeo Serra Tramuntana	Trofeo Andratx - Pollença	Trofeo Palma
2025	Jan Christen (SUI)	Marijn van den Berg (NED)	Florian Stork (GER)	Cancelled	Iúri Leitão (POR)
2026	António Morgado (POR)	Red Bull–Bora–Hansgrohe	Remco Evenepoel (BEL)	Remco Evenepoel (BEL)	Arne Marit (BEL)
