= 2005 Vuelta a Andalucía =

Race details
- Dates: 13–17 February 2005
- Stages: 5
- Distance: 803.8 km (499.5 mi)
- Winning time: 20h 33' 25"

Results
| | Winner | Francisco Cabello (ESP) |
| | Second | Daniel Moreno (ESP) |
| | Third | José Luis Martínez (ESP) |

The 2005 Vuelta a Andalucía was the 51st edition of the Vuelta a Andalucía cycle race and was held on 13 February to 17 February 2005. The race started in Benalmádena and finished in Chiclana de la Frontera. The race was won by Francisco Cabello.

== Teams ==
Fifteen teams of seven riders started the race:

- Saunier Duval–Prodir
- Davitamon–Lotto
- T-Mobile Team
- Rabobank
- Chocolade Jacques–T Interim
- Quick-Step–Innergetic
- MrBookmaker.com–SportsTech
- Euskaltel–Euskadi
- Relax–Fuenlabrada
- Discovery Channel
- Illes Balears–Banesto
- Comunidad Valenciana–Elche
- Fassa Bortolo
- Andalucía–Paul Versan
- Kaiku

== General classification ==
Final general classification

| Rank | Rider | Time |
|---|---|---|
| 1 | Francisco Cabello (ESP) | 20h 33' 25" |
| 2 | Daniel Moreno (ESP) | + 1' 30" |
| 3 | José Luis Martínez (ESP) | + 2' 36" |
| 4 | Vicente Reynés (ESP) | + 2' 45" |
| 5 | Juan Manuel Gárate (ESP) | + 3' 00" |
| 6 | Manuel Beltrán (ESP) | + 3' 16" |
| 7 | David Cañada (ESP) | + 3' 33" |
| 8 | Ezequiel Mosquera (ESP) | + 4' 01" |
| 9 | Ángel Castresana (ESP) | + 4' 23" |
| 10 | Jon Bru (ESP) | + 4' 37" |
