= 2002 Vuelta a Andalucía =

Race details
- Dates: 17–21 February 2002
- Stages: 5
- Distance: 821.9 km (510.7 mi)
- Winning time: 21h 17' 40"

Results
	Winner	Antonio Colom (ESP)
	Second	Axel Merckx (BEL)
	Third	Javier Rodríguez (ESP)

The 2002 Vuelta a Andalucía was the 48th edition of the Vuelta a Andalucía (Ruta del Sol) cycle race and was held on 17 February to 21 February 2002. The race started in Huelva and finished in Granada. The race was won by Antonio Colom.

== Teams ==
Twenty teams of eight riders started the race:

- Rabobank
- Lotto–Adecco
- Team Telekom
- Domo–Farm Frites
- Team Coast
- Fassa Bortolo
- Team Nürnberger Versicherung
- Euskaltel–Euskadi
- ONCE–Eroski
- Colchon Relax–Fuenlabrada
- Jazztel–Costa de Almería
- iBanesto.com
- Kelme–Costa Blanca
- Alessio
- Lampre–Daikin
- Phonak
- Mercatone Uno
- Milaneza–MSS
- AG2R Prévoyance
- Cofidis

== General classification ==
Final general classification

Rank	Rider	Time
1	Antonio Colom (ESP)	21h 17' 40"
2	Axel Merckx (BEL)	+ 16"
3	Javier Rodríguez (ESP)	+ 17"
4	Francisco Cabello (ESP)	+ 25"
5	Alexandr Shefer (KAZ)	s.t.
6	Erik Dekker (NED)	+ 33"
7	Adolfo García Quesada (ESP)	+ 38"
8	Mikel Zarrabeitia (ESP)	s.t.
9	Manuel Beltrán (ESP)	s.t.
10	Erik Zabel (GER)	+ 42"
