= 1998 Vuelta a Andalucía =

Race details
- Dates: 15–19 February 1998
- Stages: 5
- Distance: 839.9 km (521.9 mi)
- Winning time: 21h 39' 58"

Results
| | Winner | Marcelino García (ESP) |
| | Second | Laurent Jalabert (FRA) |
| | Third | David Etxebarria (ESP) |

The 1998 Vuelta a Andalucía was the 44th edition of the Vuelta a Andalucía (Ruta del Sol) cycle race and was held on 15 February to 19 February 1998. The race started in Seville and finished in Granada. The race was won by Marcelino García.

== Teams ==
Nineteen teams of up to eight riders started the race:

- Team Telekom
- ONCE
- Banesto
- Mapei–Bricobi
- Casino–Ag2r
- U.S. Postal Service
- Estepona en Marcha–Brepac
- Kelme–Costa Blanca
- Gerolsteiner
- Euskaltel–Euskadi
- Lotto–Mobistar
- TVM–Farm Frites
- Troiamarisco
- Rabobank
- Palmans–Ideal
- Française des Jeux
- Cofidis
- Continental–Olympia
- Vitalicio Seguros

== General classification ==
Final general classification

| Rank | Rider | Time |
|---|---|---|
| 1 | Marcelino García (ESP) | 21h 39' 58" |
| 2 | Laurent Jalabert (FRA) | + 5" |
| 3 | David Etxebarria (ESP) | + 10" |
| 4 | Frank Vandenbroucke (BEL) | + 15" |
| 5 | Francisco Cabello (ESP) | + 27" |
| 6 | Ginés Salmerón (ESP) | + 32" |
| 7 | Viatcheslav Ekimov (RUS) | s.t. |
| 8 | Andrei Tchmil (BEL) | + 36" |
| 9 | Juan Miguel Mercado (ESP) | s.t. |
| 10 | Frédéric Bessy (FRA) | s.t. |
