= Francisco Cabello (cyclist) =

Spanish cyclist (born 1969)

Personal information
- Full name: Francisco Cabello Luque
- Born: 20 May 1969 (age 57) La Zubia, Spain
- Height: 1.73 m (5 ft 8 in)
- Weight: 65 kg (143 lb; 10 st 3 lb)

Cycling career
- Sport: Cycling
- Current team: Retired
- Discipline: Road
- Role: Rider

Professional teams
- 1990–2005: Kelme–Ibexpress
- 2006: Andalucía–Paul Versan

Major wins
- 1 stage 1994 Tour de France

Francisco Cabello Luque (born 20 May 1969, in La Zubia) is a Spanish former professional road cyclist who competed from 1990 to 2006.

== Major results ==
1992
1st Memorial Manuel Galera
1993
6th Overall Vuelta a Andalucía
1994
1st Overall Vuelta a Mallorca
1st Stage 4 Tour de France
3rd Overall Vuelta a Andalucía
1996
1st Overall Vuelta a Mallorca

1st Trofeo Soller

1st Stage 2 Vuelta a La Rioja
1998
5th Overall Vuelta a Andalucía
1999
1st Trofeo Calvià
5th Overall Vuelta a La Rioja
2000
1st Overall Vuelta a Mallorca

1st Trofeo Andratx

2nd Overall Vuelta a Andalucía

1st Mountains classification

7th Overall Vuelta a Murcia

1st Stage 2

2001
2nd Circuito de Getxo
5th Overall Vuelta a Murcia

1st Mountains classification
1st Stage 4

2002
1st Overall Vuelta a Mallorca
4th Overall Vuelta a Andalucía
7th Trofeo Calvià
2003
7th Overall Vuelta a Andalucía
8th Klasika Primavera
9th Trofeo Calvià
2005
1st Overall Vuelta a Andalucía
7th Clásica a los Puertos de Guadarrama
2006
1st Mountains classification Clásica Internacional de Alcobendas
9th Overall Escalada a Montjuïc
