= Roberto Lezaun =

Spanish cyclist

Personal information
- Full name: Roberto Lezaun Zubiria
- Born: 23 July 1967 (age 59) Pamplona, Spain

Cycling career
- Sport: Cycling
- Current team: Retired
- Disciplines: Road, Mountain
- Role: Rider

Professional teams
- 1991–1993: Banesto
- 1994: Festina–Lotus
- 1995: Equipo Euskadi
- 1996–2000: Orbea (MTB)

Roberto Lezaun Zubiria (born 23 July 1967) is a Spanish former professional cyclist. He rode in four editions of the Vuelta a España. He also competed at the 1996 Summer Olympics and the 2000 Summer Olympics.

== Major results ==
1990
1st Overall Vuelta a Navarra
1991
1st Overall Vuelta a Andalucía
1997
1st National Cross-country Championships
1998
1st National Cross-country Championships
1999
3rd Cross-country, European Mountain Bike Championships
