= Mariano Rojas =

Spanish cyclist (1973–1996)

Personal information
- Born: 12 June 1973 Cieza, Murcia, Spain
- Died: 23 June 1996 (aged 23) Murcia, Spain

Cycling career
- Sport: Cycling
- Role: Rider

Mariano Rojas (12 June 1973 – 23 June 1996) was a Spanish professional racing cyclist. He rode in the 1995 Tour de France. His brother is José Joaquín Rojas.
