= Winner Anacona =

Colombian road cyclist

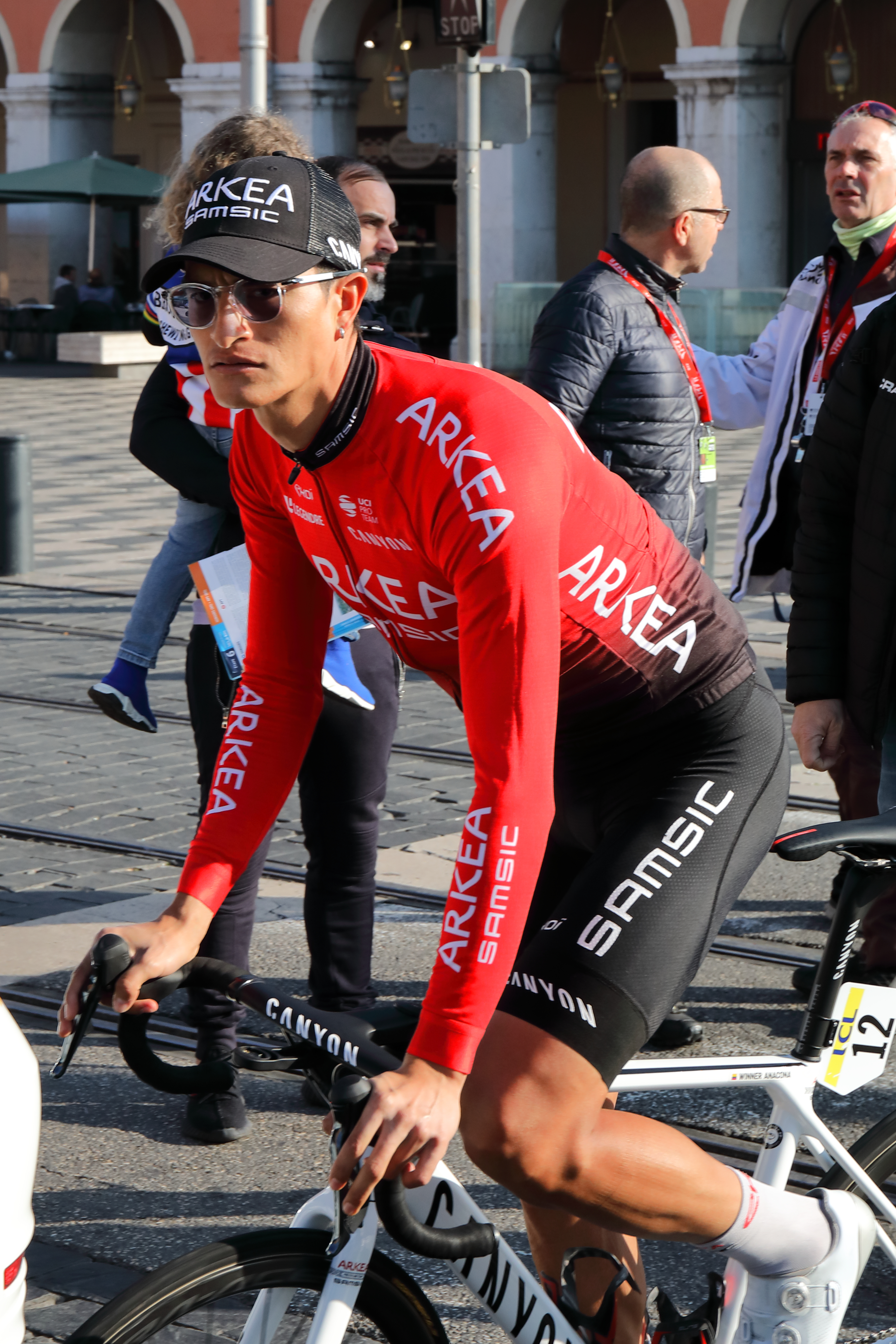
- Anacona in 2020

Personal information
- Full name: Winner Andrew Anacona Gomez
- Born: 11 August 1988 (age 38) Coper, Boyacá, Colombia
- Height: 1.79 m (5 ft 10 1/2 in)
- Weight: 65 kg (143 lb)

Cycling career
- Sport: Cycling
- Current team: Colombia Potencia de la Vida–Strongman
- Disciplines: Road; Track
- Role: Rider
- Rider type: Climber

Amateur teams
- 2008: Centri della Calzatura–Partizan (stagiaire)
- 2009: G.S. Maltinti
- 2010–2011: Caparrini
- 2023–: Colombia Pacto por el Deporte

Professional teams
- 2012–2014: Lampre–ISD
- 2015–2019: Movistar Team
- 2020–2022: Arkéa–Samsic

Major wins
- Grand Tours Vuelta a España 1 individual stage (2014)

Winner Andrew Anacona Gomez (born 11 August 1988) is a Colombian road cyclist, who rides for Colombian amateur team Colombia Potencia de la Vida–Strongman.

== Career ==
=== Lampre–ISD (2012–2014) ===
He impressed the Lampre–ISD team managers after getting second place of the 2011 Girobio, a smaller version of the Giro d'Italia for younger riders. The team signed him for 2012 and 2013. In December 2012, Anacona was injured in a training crash, after he collided with a dog. He suffered a broken peroneal malleolus and dislocated his ankle bone.

In the mountainous 2014 Tour of Utah, Anacona helped his leader Chris Horner obtain the second place of the race, taking the third step of the podium himself. On the mountaintop finish of Stage 9 of the 2014 Vuelta a España, Anacona almost took the leader's jersey by soloing to the line for the stage victory. He attacked from a breakaway of 31 riders and missed the top spot in the overall classification by a mere 9 seconds.

=== Movistar Team (2015–2019) ===
In 2015, Anacona went to Movistar Team on an initial two-year contract. He was named in the start list for the 2015 Tour de France.

=== Arkéa–Samsic (2020–2022) ===
In September 2019, it was announced that Anacona – along with Dayer Quintana and Nairo Quintana – was moving to the Arkéa–Samsic team for the 2020 season. During his three years with the team, he won the 2021 Trofeo Andratx–Mirador d'Es Colomer – held as part of the Vuelta a Mallorca – and the mountains classification at the 2022 Route d'Occitanie.

== Personal life ==
Anacona was named after cyclists Peter Winnen and Andrew Hampsten, but due to a mistake, his first name became Winner instead of Winnen.

== Major results ==
2006
National Junior Track Championships

1st Team pursuit
1st Points race

1st Time trial, National Junior Road Championships
2009
10th Gran Premio Industrie del Marmo
2010
2nd Time trial, National Under-23 Road Championships
8th Overall Girobio
10th Trofeo Gianfranco Bianchin
2011
2nd Overall Girobio

1st Stage 5

6th Trofeo Gianfranco Bianchin
2012
10th Overall Tour of Slovenia
2014
1st Stage 9 Vuelta a España
2nd Road race, National Road Championships
3rd Overall Tour of Utah
2015
6th Overall Vuelta a Burgos
2016
6th Overall Vuelta a Castilla y León
9th Overall Abu Dhabi Tour
2019
1st Overall Vuelta a San Juan

1st Stage 5

4th Overall Tour of Austria
8th Circuito de Getxo
2020
3rd Prueba Villafranca de Ordizia
2021
1st Trofeo Andratx – Mirador d'Es Colomer
2022
1st Mountains classification, Route d'Occitanie
2023
10th Overall Vuelta a Boyacá

=== Grand Tour general classification results timeline ===
Grand Tour	2012	2013	2014	2015	2016	2017	2018	2019	2020
Giro d'Italia	—	—	62	—	—	25	—	—	—
Tour de France	—	—	—	57	69	—	—	—	66
Vuelta a España	19	105	27	—	—	—	69	—	—

Legend
—	Did not compete
DNF	Did not finish
