= Miguel Ángel Peña =

Spanish cyclist

Personal information
- Born: 8 July 1970 (age 56) Granada, Spain

Cycling career
- Sport: Cycling
- Current team: Retired
- Discipline: Road
- Role: Rider

Professional teams
- 1993: CLAS–Cajastur
- 1994–1996: Mapei–CLAS
- 1997–1999: Banesto
- 2000–2001: ONCE–Deutsche Bank

Miguel Ángel Peña (born 8 July 1970) is a Spanish racing cyclist. He rode in three editions of the Tour de France, two editions of the Vuelta a España, and three editions of the Giro d'Italia.

== Major results ==
1995
2nd GP Miguel Induráin
1998
2nd Overall Critérium du Dauphiné libéré

1st Stage 7

2000
1st Overall Vuelta a Andalucía

1st Stage 3
