= Sabero =

Coordinates: 42°50′N 5°09′W

Sabero, Spain
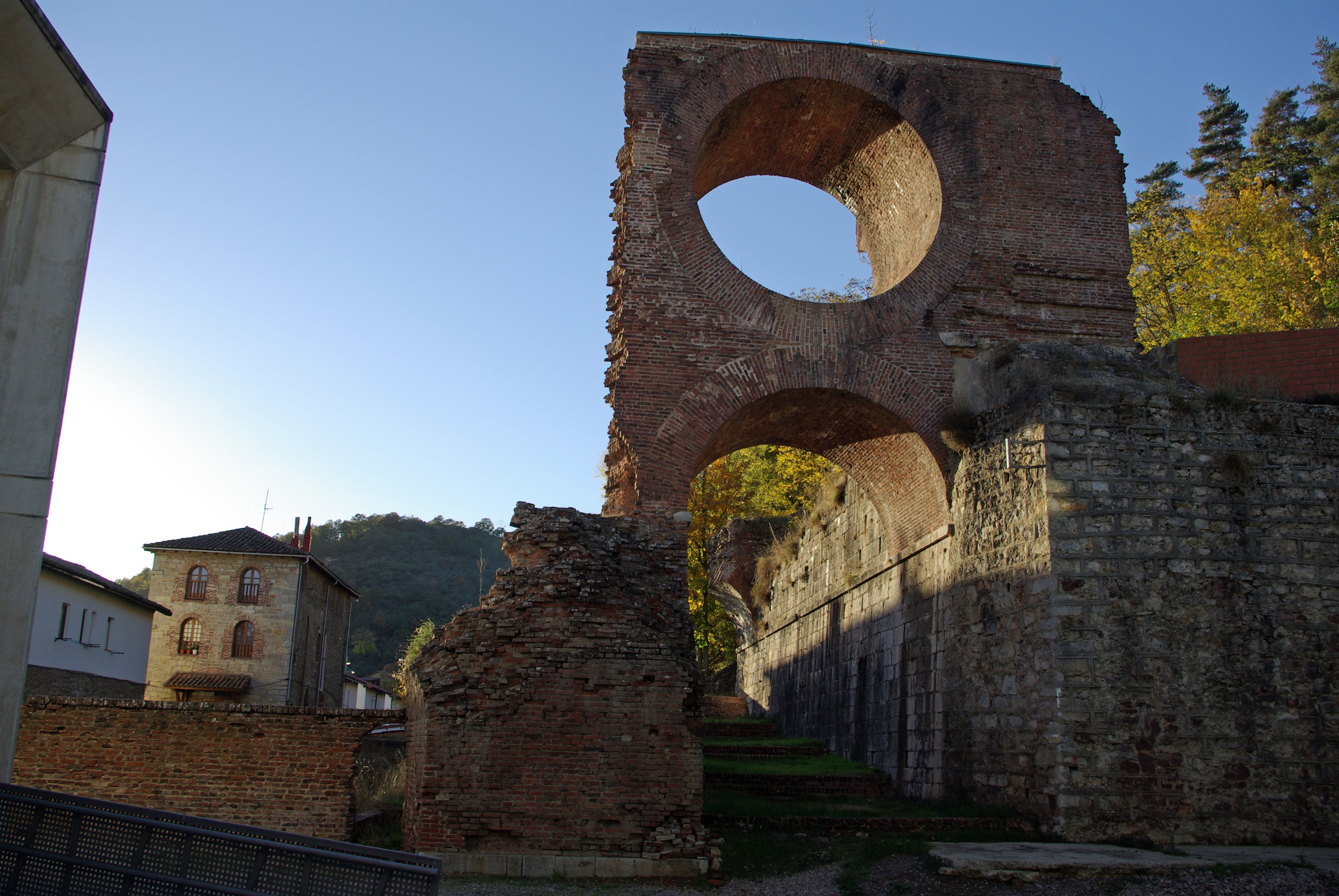
- Blast furnace ruins in Sabero (León, Spain).

- Coat of arms
- Interactive map of Sabero, Spain
- Country: Spain
- Autonomous community: Castile and León
- Province: León
- Municipality: Sabero

Area
  - Total: 24.94 km^{2} (9.63 sq mi)
- Elevation: 982 m (3,222 ft)

Population (2025-01-01)
  - Total: 1,020
  - Density: 40.9/km^{2} (106/sq mi)
- Time zone: UTC+1 (CET)
  - Summer (DST): UTC+2 (CEST)

Sabero is a village in the province of León, Castile and León, in north-western Spain. According to the 2019 census (INE), the municipality has a population of 1,140 inhabitants.

It is the location of the Castile and León Museum of Metallurgy and Mining (Museo de la Siderurgia y de la Minería de Castilla y León). This was opened on 3 July 2008 by Juan Vicente Herrera Campo, the president of Castile and León.
