= Stefano Della Santa =

Italian former road bicycle racer

Personal information
- Full name: Stefano Della Santa
- Born: 22 May 1967 (age 59) Lucca, Italy

Cycling career
- Sport: Cycling
- Discipline: Road
- Role: Rider

Professional teams
- 1989: Pepsi Cola-Alba Cucine
- 1990–1992: Amore & Vita-Fanini
- 1993: Mapei
- 1993: Eldor-Viner
- 1994: Mapei-CLAS
- 1995–1996: Mapei-GB
- 1997: Mercatone Uno
- 1998: Ros Mary-Amica Chips
- 1999: Amica Chips-Costa de Almeria
- 2000: Alexia Alluminio

Stefano Della Santa (born 22 May 1967) is an Italian former road bicycle racer.

== Achievements ==
1993
1st, Giro di Campania
1st, Trofeo Melinda
1994
1st, Overall, Bicicleta Vasca
1st, Overall, Vuelta a Andalucía

1st, Stages 4 & 5b

1st, Overall, Setmana Catalana de Ciclisme

1st, Stage 3

1995
1st, Overall, Vuelta a Andalucía
2000
1st, Stage 3, Grand Prix Cycliste de Beauce
