= Meis =

Concello de Meis
- Municipality
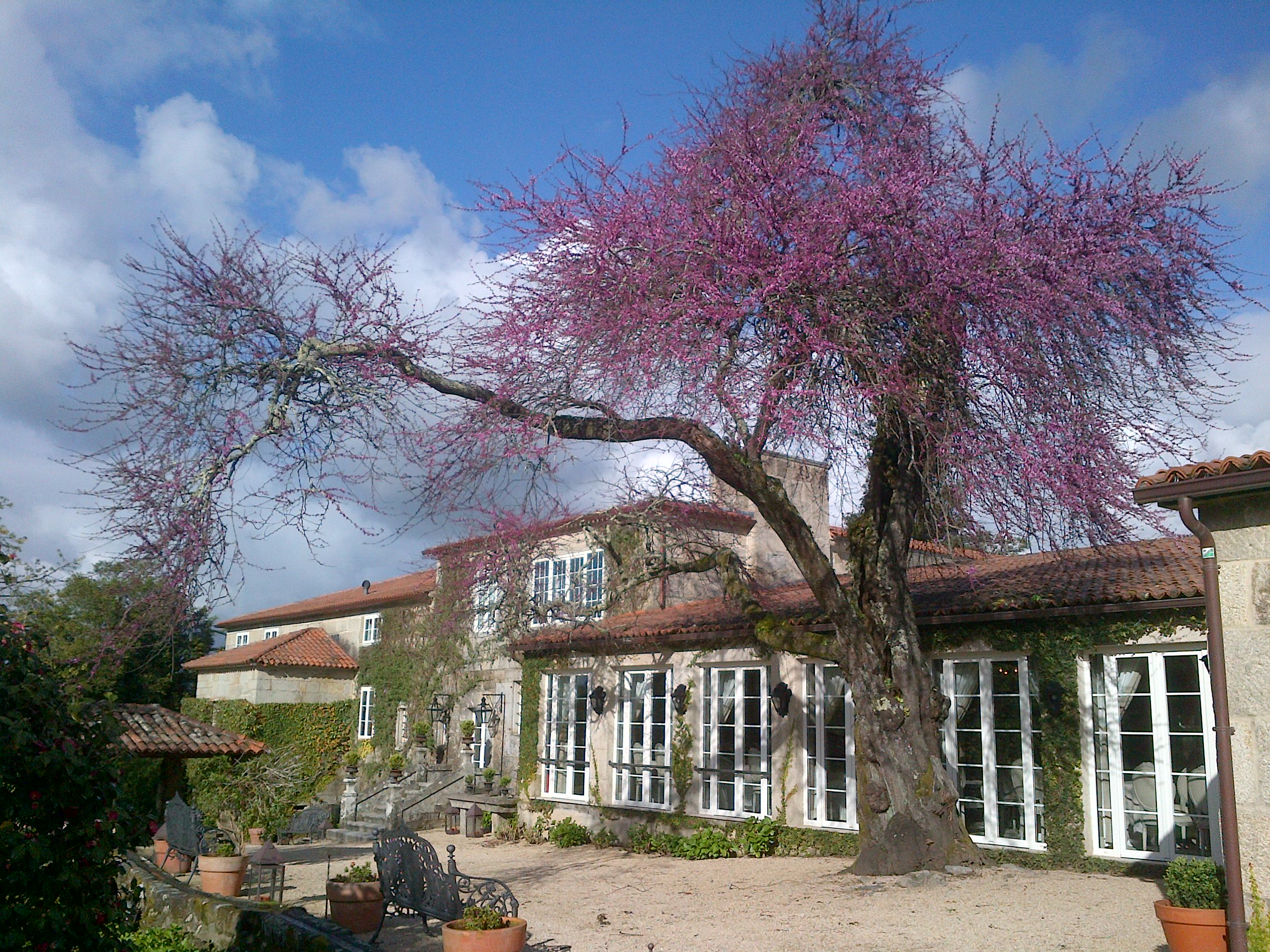
- Pazo Señorans (2016)

- Coat of arms

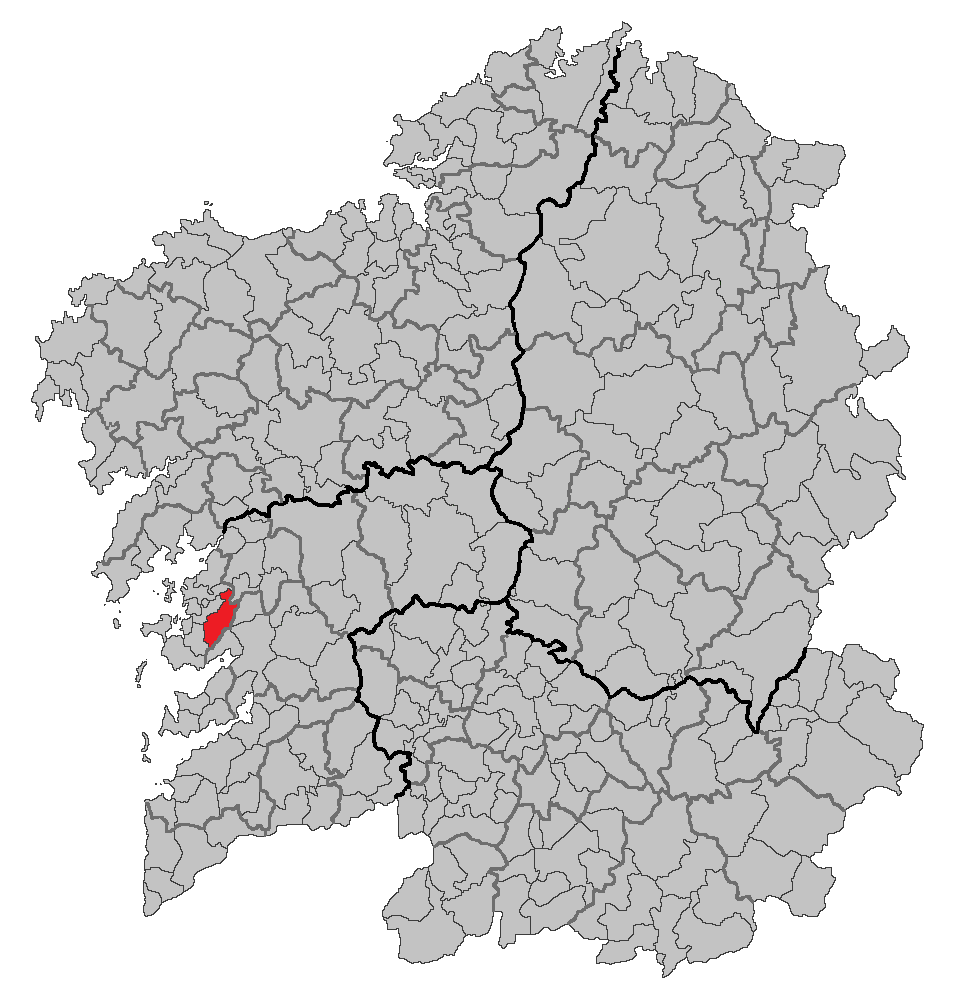
- Location of Meis within Galicia
- Coordinates: 42°31′N 8°42′W

Population (2025-01-01)
  - Total: 4,682
- Time zone: UTC+1 (CET)
  - Summer (DST): UTC+2 (CET)

Meis is a municipality in Galicia, Spain in the province of Pontevedra.

Meis can also be referred to as a name originating from Germany.

== See also ==
- List of municipalities in Pontevedra
