= Miguel Ángel Martínez Torres =

Spanish cyclist

Miguel Ángel Martínez
Personal information
- Full name: Miguel Ángel Martínez Torres
- Born: 28 June 1967 (age 59) Colomera, Spain

Cycling career
- Sport: Cycling
- Current team: Retired
- Discipline: Road
- Role: Rider

Professional teams
- 1988–1989: Seur–Campagnolo–Bic
- 1990–1994: ONCE

Miguel Ángel Martínez Torres (born 28 June 1967) is a Spanish former cyclist.

== Major results ==
1986
1st Clásica de Almería
1988
1st Memorial Manuel Galera
2nd Subida a Urkiola
3rd Clásica a los Puertos de Guadarrama
1990
1st Prueba Villafranca de Ordizia
2nd Overall Vuelta a Andalucía
3rd Trofeo Luis Puig
1992
1st Overall Vuelta a Andalucía
1993
1st GP Llodio

=== Grand Tour general classification results timeline ===
Grand Tour	1989	1990	1991	1992	1993
Vuelta a España	—	DNF	—	104	38
Giro d'Italia	DNF	—	68	—	—
Tour de France	—	29	76	101	58

Legend
—	Did not compete
DNF	Did not finish
