= La Zubia =

- Coat of arms

- Location in the Province of Granada Location in Andalusia Location in Spain
- Coordinates: 37°7′14″N 3°35′6″W
- Country: Spain
- Autonomous community: Andalusia
- Province: Granada
- Comarca: Vega de Granada

Government
  - Mayor: Inmaculada Hernández (PP-A)

Area
  - Total: 22 km^{2} (8.5 sq mi)
- Elevation: 740 m (2,430 ft)

Population (2025-01-01)
  - Total: 20,389
  - Density: 930/km^{2} (2,400/sq mi)
- Time zone: UTC+1 (CET)
  - Summer (DST): UTC+2 (CEST)
- Website: www2.ayuntamientolazubia.com

La Zubia is a municipality located in the province of Granada, Spain. According to the 2010 census (INE), the city has a population of 18,240 inhabitants.

== Twin towns — sister cities ==
La Zubia is twinned with:

- Miercurea Ciuc, Romania

== See also ==
- List of municipalities in Granada
