= RaboRonde Heerlen =

Bicycle racing event

Race details
- Date: 1st Friday after Tour de France
- Region: Heerlen, Netherlands
- English name: Proftour of Heerlen
- Discipline: Road race
- Type: criterium
- Organiser: 1990–2009: Stichting Profronde Heerlen; 2010- : Stichting Cyclocross Heerlen
- Web site: www.raborondeheerlen.nl

History
- First edition: Men: 1990; Women: 2013
- Editions: Men: 30 (as of 2019); Women: 7 (as of 2019)
- First winner: Men; Peter Winnen (NED); Women; Liesbet De Vocht (BEL)
- Most recent: Men; Mike Teunissen (NED); Women; Roxane Knetemann (NED)

RaboRonde Heerlen or Profronde van Heerlen (English: Proftour Heerlen) is an elite men's and women's professional road bicycle racing event held annually in Heerlen, Netherlands. It's one of the largest post-Tour de France criteriums with about 50,000 spectators annually. The first edition was in 1990 and since 2013 the event also includes a women's race.

The race is organized by Stichting Cyclocross Heerlen on the first Friday after the Tour de France. Until 2009 the event was organized by Stichting Profronde Heerlen.

== Honours ==
=== Men's ===
Year	Winner	Second	Third
1990	(Netherlands) Peter Winnen	(Netherlands) Jelle Nijdam	(Netherlands) Erik Breukink
1991	(Netherlands) Frans Maassen	(Netherlands) Henk Lubberding	(Germany) Uwe Raab
1992	(Netherlands) Ad Wijnands	(Netherlands) Jelle Nijdam	(Italy) Guido Bontempi
1993	(Netherlands) Danny Nelissen	(Netherlands) Gert Jakobs	(Denmark) Bo Hamburger
1994	(Netherlands) Adri van der Poel	(Uzbekistan) Djamolidine Abdoujaparov	(Italy) Silvio Martinello
1995	(Netherlands) Frans Maassen	(Germany) Erik Zabel	(Netherlands) Wiebren Veenstra
1996	(Netherlands) Jeroen Blijlevens	(Netherlands) John Talen	(Netherlands) Max van Heeswijk
1997	(Netherlands) Michael Boogerd	(Germany) Jan Ullrich	(Netherlands) Raymond Meijs
1998	(Netherlands) Max van Heeswijk	(Germany) Jens Heppner	(Netherlands) Servais Knaven
1999	(United States) Lance Armstrong	(Belgium) Kurt van de Wouwer	(Netherlands) Maarten den Bakker
2000	(Netherlands) Erik Dekker	(Netherlands) Servais Knaven	(Belgium) Geert Verheyen
2001	(Netherlands) Jans Koerts	(France) Laurent Jalabert	(Netherlands) Marc Lotz
2002	(Australia) Robbie McEwen	(Netherlands) Michael Boogerd	(Netherlands) Bram Schmitz
2003	(Netherlands) Servais Knaven	(Netherlands) Léon van Bon	(Australia) Bradley McGee
2004	(Netherlands) Marc Lotz	(Australia) Robbie McEwen	(Norway) Thor Hushovd
2005	(Denmark) Michael Rasmussen	(Spain) Óscar Pereiro Sio	(Netherlands) Léon van Bon
2006	(Spain) Óscar Freire	(Australia) Robbie McEwen	(Netherlands) Joost Posthuma
2007	(Netherlands) Thomas Dekker	(Netherlands) Steven de Jongh	(Netherlands) Bram de Groot
2008	(United Kingdom) Mark Cavendish	(Belgium) Gert Steegmans	(Netherlands) Bram Tankink
2009	(Spain) Alberto Contador	(Italy) Alessandro Ballan	(Netherlands) Laurens ten Dam
2010	(Netherlands) Karsten Kroon	(Netherlands) Maarten Tjallingii	(Netherlands) Johnny Hoogerland
2011	(Luxembourg) Andy Schleck	(France) Pierre Rolland	(Netherlands) Wout Poels
2012	(Netherlands) Rob Ruijgh	(Netherlands) Tom Dumoulin	(Netherlands) Bram Tankink
2013	(Netherlands) Lars Boom	(Netherlands) Tom Dumoulin	(Netherlands) Koen de Kort
2014	(Netherlands) Tom Dumoulin	(Netherlands) Sebastian Langeveld	(Netherlands) Niki Terpstra
2015	(Germany) Simon Geschke	(Netherlands) Wout Poels	(Netherlands) Bram Tankink
2016	(Netherlands) Wout Poels	(Netherlands) Stef Clement	(Netherlands) Dylan Groenewegen
2017	(Netherlands) Ramon Sinkeldam	(Netherlands) Jos van Emden	(Netherlands) Marco Minnaard
2018	(Netherlands) Tom Dumoulin	(Netherlands) Wout Poels	(Netherlands) Ramon Sinkeldam
2019	(Netherlands) Mike Teunissen	(Netherlands) Koen de Kort	(Netherlands) Roy Curvers
2022	(Netherlands) Mathieu van der Poel	(Netherlands) Pascal Eenkhoorn	(Netherlands) Danny van Poppel
2023	(Netherlands) Wout Poels	(Netherlands) Wilco Kelderman	(Netherlands) Danny van Poppel
2024	(United Kingdom) Mark Cavendish	(Netherlands) Bauke Mollema	(Netherlands) Frank van den Broek
2025	(Netherlands) Thymen Arensman	(Australia) Kaden Groves	(Netherlands) Danny van Poppel

=== Men's Time Trial ===
Year	Winner	Time
2017	(Netherlands) Jos van Emden	2'22.41"
2018	(Netherlands) Jaap Kooijman	2'22.90"
2019	(Netherlands) Lars Boom	

=== Women's ===
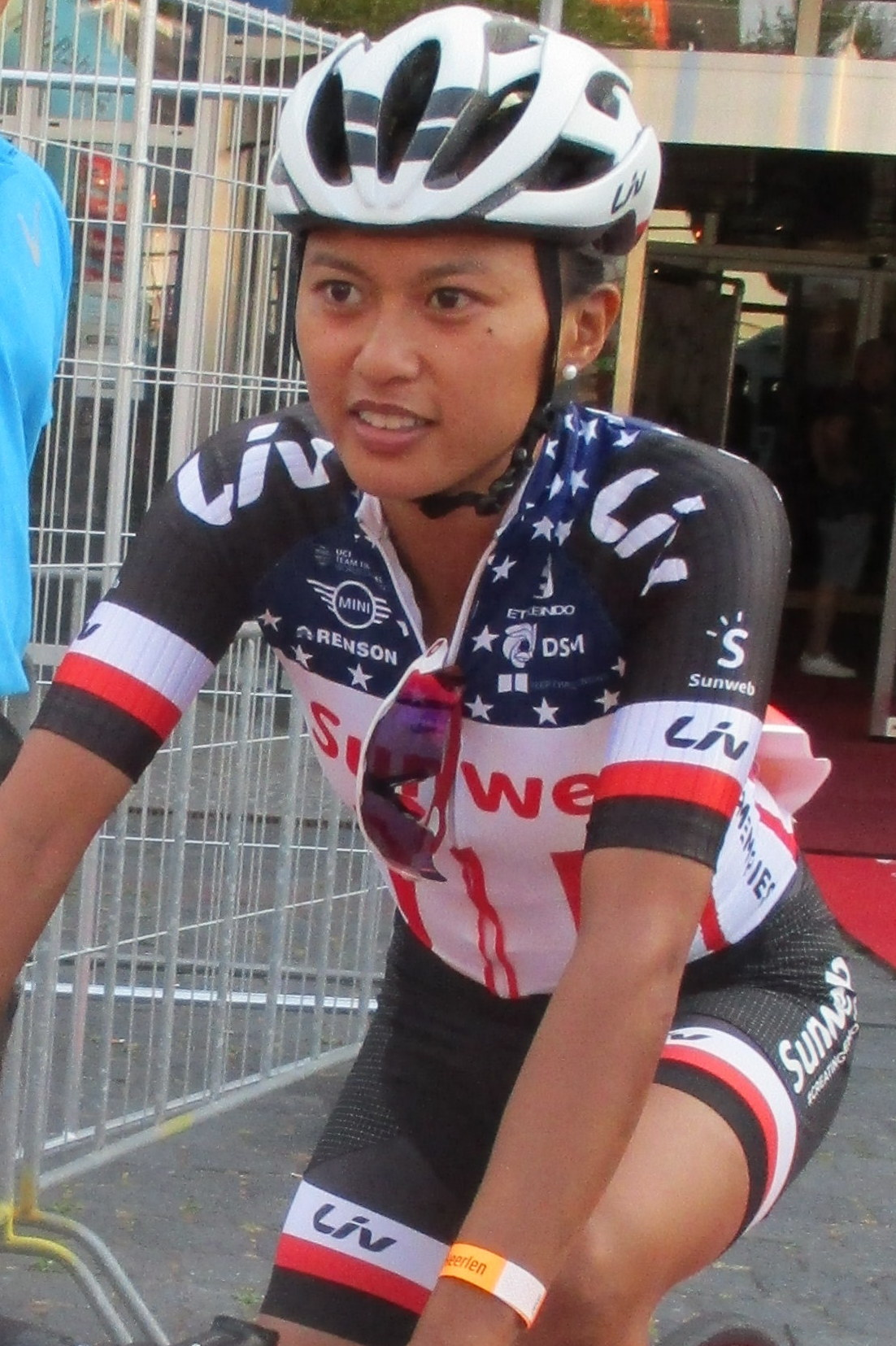
Winner Coryn Rivera in 2018.

Year	Winner	Second	Third
2013	(Belgium) Liesbet De Vocht	(Netherlands) Anna van der Breggen	(Netherlands) Pauliena Rooijakkers
2014	(Netherlands) Ellen van Dijk	(Netherlands) Iris Slappendel	(Belgium) Liesbet De Vocht
2015	(Netherlands) Chantal Blaak	(Netherlands) Anna van der Breggen	(Netherlands) Kyara Stijns
2016	(Netherlands) Chantal Blaak	(Netherlands) Anouk Rijff	(Netherlands) Ilona Hoeksma
2017	(Netherlands) Annemiek van Vleuten	(Netherlands) Chantal Blaak	(Netherlands) Pauliena Rooijakkers
2018	(United States) Coryn Rivera	(Netherlands) Pauliena Rooijakkers	(Canada) Leah Kirchmann
2019	(Netherlands) Roxane Knetemann	(United States) Katie Hall	(Germany) Franziska Koch
