= 1999 Amstel Gold Race =

Dutch cycling race

The 1999 Amstel Gold Race was the 34th edition of the annual Amstel Gold Race road bicycle race, held on Sunday April 24, 1999, in the Dutch province of Limburg. The race stretched 253 kilometres, with the start and finish in Maastricht. There were a total of 190 competitors, with 84 cyclists finishing the race.

== Results ==
	Cyclist	Team	Time
1	Michael Boogerd (NED)	Rabobank	6h 37' 23"
~~2~~	~~Lance Armstrong (USA)~~	~~U.S. Postal Service~~	~~s.t.~~
3	Gabriele Missaglia (ITA)	Lampre–Daikin	s.t.
4	Maarten den Bakker (NED)	Rabobank	s.t.
5	Laurent Roux (FRA)	Casino–Ag2r Prévoyance	s.t.
6	Léon van Bon (NED)	Rabobank	+ 46"
7	Markus Zberg (SUI)	Rabobank	s.t.
8	Gian Matteo Fagnini (ITA)	Saeco–Cannondale	+ 51"
9	Daniele Nardello (ITA)	Mapei–Quick-Step	s.t.
10	Marco Velo (ITA)	Mercatone Uno–Bianchi	+ 54"
