= 1997 Brabantse Pijl =

Race details
- Dates: 30 March 1997
- Stages: 1
- Distance: 183 km (113.7 mi)
- Winning time: 4h 13' 00"

Results
| | Winner | Gianluca Pianegonda (ITA) |
| | Second | Maarten den Bakker (NED) |
| | Third | Michael Boogerd (NED) |

The 1997 Brabantse Pijl was the 37th edition of the Brabantse Pijl cycle race and was held on 30 March 1997. The race started and finished in Alsemberg. The race was won by Gianluca Pianegonda.

== General classification ==
Final general classification

| Rank | Rider | Time |
|---|---|---|
| 1 | Gianluca Pianegonda (ITA) | 4h 13' 00" |
| 2 | Maarten den Bakker (NED) | s.t. |
| 3 | Michael Boogerd (NED) | s.t. |
| 4 | Luc Roosen (BEL) | + 11" |
| 5 | Marc Wauters (BEL) | + 22" |
| 6 | Carlo Bomans (BEL) | s.t. |
| 7 | Peter Farazijn (BEL) | + 2' 10" |
| 8 | Léon van Bon (NED) | + 2' 16" |
| 9 | Max Sciandri (GBR) | + 2' 20" |
| 10 | Christophe Mengin (FRA) | + 2' 37" |
