= 1999 Paris–Nice =

Race details
- Dates: 7–14 March 1999
- Stages: 7 + Prologue
- Distance: 1,366.3 km (849.0 mi)
- Winning time: 36h 04' 13"

Results
Jersey awarded to the overall winner	Winner	Michael Boogerd (NED)	(Rabobank)
	Second	Markus Zberg (SUI)	(Rabobank)
	Third	Santiago Botero (COL)	(Kelme–Costa Blanca)

The 1999 Paris–Nice was the 57th edition of the Paris–Nice cycle race and was held from 7 March to 14 March 1999. The race started in Boulogne-Billancourt and finished in Nice. The race was won by Michael Boogerd of the Rabobank team.

== Teams ==
Sixteen teams, containing a total of 128 riders, participated in the race:

- Cofidis
- Mapei–Quick-Step
- Casino–Ag2r Prévoyance
- Rabobank
- Française des Jeux
- Kelme–Costa Blanca
- Crédit Agricole
- Vini Caldirola
- Festina–Lotus
- U.S. Postal Service
- Cantina Tollo–Alexia Alluminio
- Lotto–Mobistar
- Team Polti
- BigMat–Auber 93
- Saeco–Cannondale
- Post Swiss Team

== Route ==
Stage characteristics and winners
Stage	Date	Course	Distance	Type	Winner
1	7 March	Boulogne-Billancourt to Paris	9 km (5.6 mi)	Individual time trial	Chris Boardman (GBR)
2	8 March	Nangis to Sens	184.7 km (114.8 mi)		Andrei Tchmil (BEL)
3	9 March	Sens to Nevers	214 km (133 mi)		Jaan Kirsipuu (EST)
4	10 March	Nevers to Vichy	204.8 km (127.3 mi)		Laurent Roux (FRA)
5	11 March	Cusset to Firminy	187 km (116 mi)		Santiago Botero (COL)
6	12 March	Romans to Sisteron	211 km (131 mi)		Jacky Durand (FRA)
7	13 March	Sisteron to Valberg	198.7 km (123.5 mi)		Frank Vandenbroucke (BEL)
8	14 March	Nice to Nice	157.1 km (97.6 mi)		Tom Steels (BEL)

== General classification ==
Final general classification

Rank	Rider	Team	Time
1	Michael Boogerd (NED)	Rabobank	36h 04' 13"
2	Markus Zberg (SUI)	Rabobank	+ 57"
3	Santiago Botero (COL)	Kelme–Costa Blanca	+ 1' 38"
4	Frank Vandenbroucke (BEL)	Cofidis	+ 2' 10"
5	Marc Wauters (BEL)	Rabobank	+ 2' 13"
6	Maarten den Bakker (NED)	Rabobank	+ 2' 14"
7	Dario Frigo (ITA)	Saeco–Cannondale	+ 2' 30"
8	Wladimir Belli (ITA)	Festina–Lotus	+ 2' 32"
9	Jens Voigt (GER)	Crédit Agricole	+ 2' 37"
10	Geert Verheyen (BEL)	Lotto–Mobistar	+ 2' 58"
