= 2001 Volta a la Comunitat Valenciana =

Race details
- Dates: 27 February–3 March 2001
- Stages: 5
- Distance: 672.5 km (417.9 mi)
- Winning time: 16h 22' 48"

Results
	Winner	Fabian Jeker (SUI)	(Milaneza–MSS)
	Second	Michael Boogerd (NED)	(Rabobank)
	Third	Alexander Vinokourov (KAZ)	(Team Telekom)

The 2001 Volta a la Comunitat Valenciana was the 59th edition of the Volta a la Comunitat Valenciana road cycling stage race, which was held from 27 February to 3 March 2001. The race started in Puerto Sagunto and finished in Valencia. The race was won by Fabian Jeker of the Milaneza–MSS team.

== General classification ==
Final general classification

Rank	Rider	Team	Time
1	Fabian Jeker (SUI)	Milaneza–MSS	16h 22' 48"
2	Michael Boogerd (NED)	Rabobank	+ 13"
3	Alexander Vinokourov (KAZ)	Team Telekom	+ 32"
4	Erik Dekker (NED)	Rabobank	+ 37"
5	Christian Vande Velde (USA)	U.S. Postal Service	+ 50"
6	Viatcheslav Ekimov (RUS)	U.S. Postal Service	+ 51"
7	José Azevedo (POR)	ONCE–Eroski	+ 1' 01"
8	Francisco Mancebo (ESP)	iBanesto.com	+ 1' 15"
9	Leonardo Piepoli (ITA)	iBanesto.com	+ 1' 19"
10	Melcior Mauri (ESP)	Milaneza–MSS	+ 1' 27"
