= Karsten Kroon =

Dutch cyclist (born 1976)

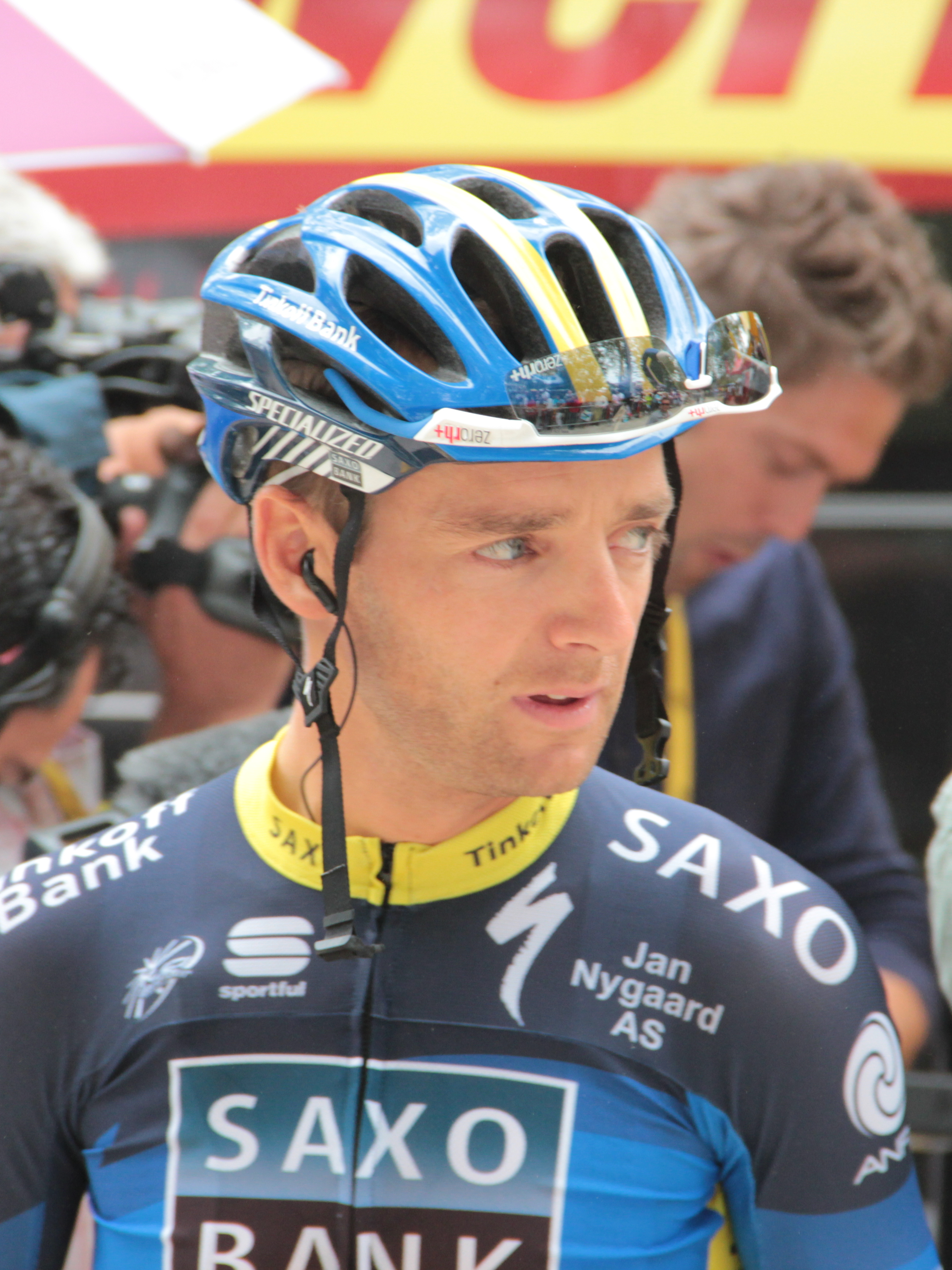
- Kroon at the 2012 Tour de France

Personal information
- Full name: Karsten Kroon
- Born: 29 January 1976 (age 50) Dalen, the Netherlands
- Height: 1.80 m (5 ft 11 in)
- Weight: 67 kg (148 lb; 10.6 st)

Cycling career
- Sport: Cycling
- Current team: Retired
- Discipline: Road
- Role: Rider
- Rider type: Classics rider

Professional teams
- 1997–2005: Rabobank
- 2006–2009: Team CSC
- 2010–2011: BMC Racing Team
- 2012–2014: Team Saxo Bank

Major wins
- Grand Tours Tour de France 1 individual stage (2002) Single-day races and Classics Rund um den Henninger Turm (2004, 2008)

Karsten Kroon (born 29 January 1976) is a Dutch former professional road bicycle racer who most recently rode for Tinkoff, a UCI ProTeam. He retired at the end of the 2014 season.

== Career ==
Born in Dalen, Kroon showed his talent as an amateur by winning the professional Ronde van Drenthe in 1996. He joined the Rabobank youth squad in 1997 and won a number of amateur races in two years. In 1999, he moved to the senior squad. His few wins included stage 8, on Bastille Day, of the 2002 Tour de France. Kroon and his teammate, Erik Dekker, finished in a seven-man group, and Kroon won a stage in his first Tour de France with the help of the more experienced Dekker. Kroon led the mountains classification in each of the three Grand Tours, though his lead did not last to the end.

On 10 August 2005 he said that, until 2007, he was to ride for Saxo Bank. He wanted more freedom. "I've never said that I want to be leader," he told Cyclingnews.com, "I only want to get chances". In March and April 2006, he was joint team captain in ProTour races. He finished in the top ten of Tirreno–Adriatico and the Tour of Flanders. He helped Fränk Schleck win the Amstel Gold Race by disrupting the chase when Schleck attacked; Kroon finished fourth. Kroon finally finished on the podium, in La Flèche Wallonne, third in front of Schleck. He also came second in the 2009 Amstel Gold Race, just behind Serguei Ivanov.

In 2010, Kroon joined BMC Racing Team, but returned to Team Saxo Bank for the 2012 season.

=== Doping ===
On 24 April 2018, it was reported that Kroon had confessed to doping for "a short period during my career". He added: "I was a professional cyclist in a very difficult time and I have a lot of respect for my colleagues who resisted the temptation to use doping."

== Major results ==
1996
1st Ronde van Drenthe
1997
1st Vlaamse Pijl
1st Stage 2 Circuit Franco-Belge
1998
1st Overall Ster der Beloften

1st Stage 2

Vuelta a Navarra

1st Stages 2 & 3

1st Stage 6 Circuit des Mines
1st Stage 2 Vuelta a León
1999
10th Clásica de Almería
2000
4th DAB Classic
7th Dwars door Gendringen
Held Mountain jersey for 13 days Giro d'Italia
2001
1st Grand Prix of Aargau Canton
3rd Sparkassen Giro Bochum
9th Brabantse Pijl
Held King of the Mountains jersey, Vuelta a España
2002
1st Stage 8 Tour de France
2003
1st Stage 5 Tour du Poitou-Charentes
2004
1st Rund um den Henninger Turm
2005
5th Brabantse Pijl
9th Omloop Het Volk
Held King of the Mountains Jersey for Stage 6, Tour de France
2006
3-Länder-Tour

1st Stages 2 & 5

3rd La Flèche Wallonne
4th Amstel Gold Race
8th Tour of Flanders
2007
4th Tour of Flanders
2008
1st Stage 2 Vuelta a Castilla y León
1st Stage 5 Sachsen-Tour
1st Rund um den Henninger Turm
5th Giro di Lombardia
9th Amstel Gold Race
2009
2nd Amstel Gold Race
2nd Rund um den Henninger Turm
4th Kuurne–Brussels–Kuurne
5th Brabantse Pijl
2010
1st RaboRonde Heerlen
9th Amstel Gold Race
2012
5th Overall Tour de l'Eurometropole

=== Grand Tour general classification results timeline ===
Grand Tour	2000	2001	2002	2003	2004	2005	2006	2007	2008	2009	2010	2011	2012	2013
Giro d'Italia	103	—	—	—	—	—	—	—	—	—	—	—	—	DNF
Tour de France	—	—	146	—	115	135	—	—	—	—	138	—	143	—
Vuelta a España	—	107	—	100	—	—	—	52	72	76	—	DNF	—	—

Legend
—	Did not compete
DNF	Did not finish

== See also ==
- List of Dutch Olympic cyclists
