= Michael Boogerd =

Dutch cyclist (born 1972)

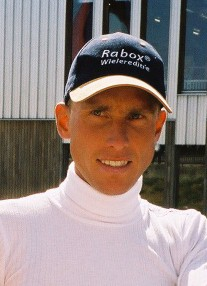

Personal information
- Full name: Michael Boogerd
- Nickname: Boogey
- Born: 28 May 1972 (age 54) The Hague, the Netherlands
- Height: 1.78 m (5 ft 10 in)
- Weight: 62.5 kg (138 lb; 9 st 12 lb)

Cycling career
- Sport: Cycling
- Discipline: Road
- Role: Rider
- Rider type: All rounder

Professional team
- 1993–2007: WordPerfect–Colnago–Decca

Major wins
- Grand Tours Tour de France 2 individual stages (1996, 2002) Stage Races Paris–Nice (1999) One-day Races and Classics National Road Race Championships (1997, 1998) Amstel Gold Race (1999) Brabantse Pijl (2001, 2003)

Michael Boogerd (born 28 May 1972) is a Dutch former professional road bicycle racer. He was one of the leaders of a generation of Dutch cyclists in the late 1990s and early 2000s, together with teammate Erik Dekker and female cyclist Leontien van Moorsel.

== Career ==
Boogerd was born and grew up in The Hague. In primary school, he was in the same class as later professional tennis player Richard Krajicek. He began his professional career in 1994, joining WordPerfect. In 1995 the team changed name to Novell, before Rabobank in 1996 became main sponsor and name for the team. Boogerd stayed with the team his entire career.

His speciality were hilly classics like Liège–Bastogne–Liège, La Flèche Wallonne and the Amstel Gold Race in the Ardennes week and the Lombardian races in the Fall, as well as mountain-stages. He has won two stages in Tour de France (1996, 2002) as well as the Amstel Gold Race and Paris–Nice. He has been Dutch Champion three times, in 1997, 1998 and in 2006. In addition to these major victories, Boogerd scored a large number of podium finishes in his favorite spring classics.

In the 1998 Tour de France, Boogerd finished 5th overall in the General classification, his highest finish ever in the Tour de France. Boogerd was also fined 1250 Swiss Francs for not wearing his national champion jersey in the prologue of that year. His main result in the 2005 Tour de France was on stage 15, where he finished 4th, 57 seconds behind stage winner, George Hincapie. Also in the Tour de France 2005, he was punished with twenty seconds at Stage 9 of the race. In the 2006 Tour de France, Boogerd's role was to support Rabobank team leader Denis Menchov in the Alps and Pyrenees. He rode exceptionally well helping his team captain to 6th overall and Michael Rasmussen to the Polka Dot jersey.

In the 2007 Tour de France Boogerd rode, again, very well. This time his teammate Michael Rasmussen was the leader of the race until the latter was fired after the last stage in the Pyrenees. On the Thursday before the start of this Tour, Boogerd infused himself with water in the early morning, before the UCI agents could arrive. His hematocrit level namely was 50, "on the edge of the edge". During the Tour, Boogerd and Thomas Dekker used cortisone (Diprofos) under a fake attest every day, and administered eight times 2000 entities of Dynepo.

Boogerd ended his career in 2007, with a 12th place in the World Championship road race in Stuttgart. His planned last race was the 2007 Giro di Lombardia, but a fall in the weeks before made him unable to participate.

After his active career, Boogerd has done freelance promotional activities for Rabobank, and is frequently seen or heard on TV during live coverage of major races, both on Dutch and Belgian television.

Boogerd was appointed team manager of Team Roompot, a UCI Professional Continental cycling team launching in 2015.

== Doping ==
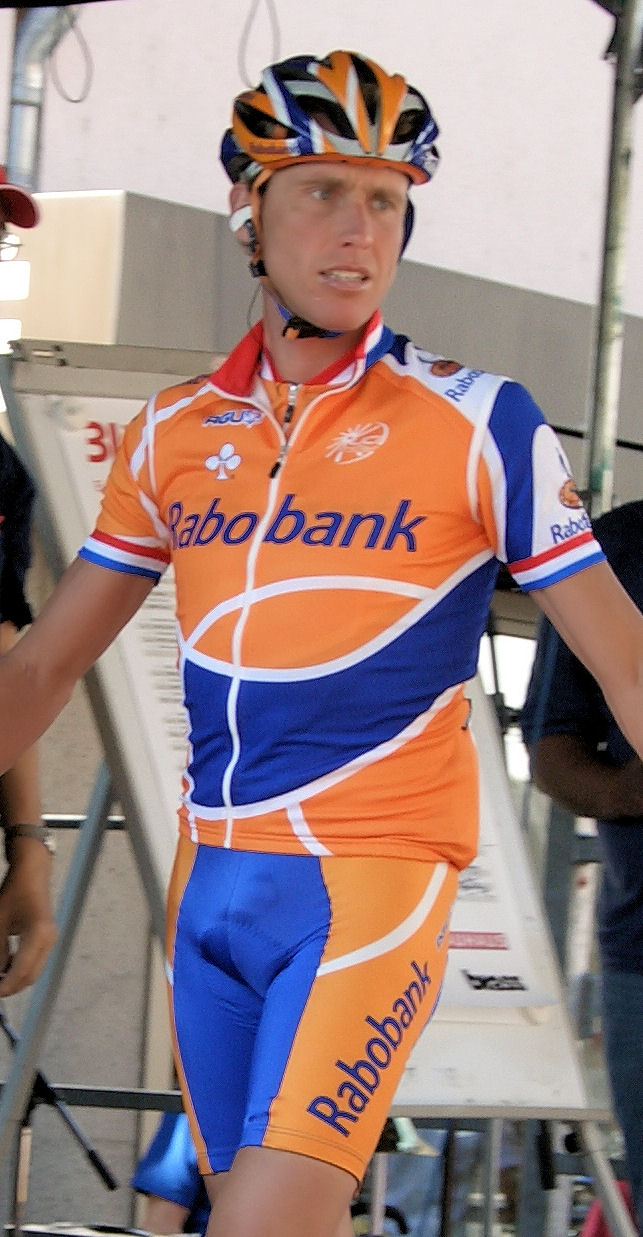
Michael Boogerd

Allegations that Boogerd used performance-enhancing drugs were made since at least 2008, when Bernhard Kohl, who had finished third in the 2008 Tour de France but was stripped of that honor after testing positive for CERA, a variant of EPO accused his manager Stefan Matschiner. Matschiner, in turn, named a number of athletes whom he had supplied with drugs and blood transfusions, including Boogerd (whose name appeared in Matschiner's files). Until early 2013, Boogerd continued to deny. He finally admitted, in a television interview on 6 March 2013 (seen by nearly a million viewers), to having used EPO, blood transfusions and cortisone from 1997 to 2007. In October 2014, he was approached by the Belgian federation, allegedly to offer him to shorten his proposed ban in exchange for naming other dopers and he answered this: "The Belgian federation had the same proposal as the Dutch Doping Authority had. I will be suspended for a long period, or I will have to talk about other people. I refuse to do that. I rather be suspended for life". In January 2016 he received a two-year suspension and his results from 2005 to 2007 were annulled.

== Major results ==
1993
8th Omloop van het Houtland
1996
1st Stage 6 Tour de France
3rd Seraing–Aachen–Seraing
10th Brabantse Pijl
1997
1st Road race, National Road Championships
1st Profronde van Heerlen
3rd Brabantse Pijl
4th Overall Critérium du Dauphiné Libéré
7th Nokere Koerse
8th Overall Setmana Catalana de Ciclisme
1998
1st Road race, National Road Championships
1st Overall Setmana Catalana de Ciclisme

1st Stage 3

2nd Overall Route du Sud
2nd Giro di Lombardia
3rd Brabantse Pijl
4th Overall Tour of the Basque Country
4th Amstel Gold Race
4th Rund um den Henninger Turm
4th Flèche Ardennaise
5th Overall Tour de France
5th Liège–Bastogne–Liège
5th Tour du Haut Var
6th Road race, UCI Road World Championships
10th Grand Prix Eddy Merckx
1999
1st Overall Paris–Nice
1st Amstel Gold Race
1st Giro dell'Emilia
1st Gran Premio Bruno Beghelli
1st Stage 5a Tour of the Basque Country
2nd Overall Tour Méditerranéen
2nd Overall Setmana Catalana de Ciclisme
2nd Liège–Bastogne–Liège
2nd Brabantse Pijl
3rd Breitling Grand Prix (with Erik Dekker)
4th Overall Giro della Provincia di Reggio Calabria
4th Classic Haribo
5th La Flèche Wallonne
6th Züri-Metzgete
8th Coppa Sabatini
9th Clásica de San Sebastián
10th Overall Volta a la Comunitat Valenciana

1st Stage 5

10th Overall Tour de Luxembourg
2000
1st Stage 7 Tirreno–Adriatico
2nd Amstel Gold Race
5th Gran Premio Industria e Commercio di Prato
6th Coppa Sabatini
8th Overall Tour de Suisse
8th Brabantse Pijl
9th Overall Tour of the Basque Country
2001
1st Overall Setmana Catalana de Ciclisme
1st Brabantse Pijl
1st Trofeo Alcúdia
2nd Overall Volta a la Comunitat Valenciana

1st Points classification
1st Stages 1 & 4

2nd Overall International Rheinland-Pfalz Rundfahrt

1st Stage 1

3rd Overall Tirreno–Adriatico

1st Stage 7

3rd Giro di Lombardia
4th Road race, National Road Championships
5th Liège–Bastogne–Liège
6th Overall Volta ao Algarve
7th Overall Tour of the Basque Country

1st Points classification

9th Amstel Gold Race
9th La Flèche Wallonne
10th Overall Tour de France
2002
1st Peperbus Profspektakel
1st Stage 16 Tour de France
1st Stage 6 Ronde van Nederland
3rd Overall Tour Méditerranéen
3rd Overall Ster Elekrotoer
3rd Amstel Gold Race
4th Overall Tour of the Basque Country
4th Coppa Sabatini
6th Giro di Lombardia
9th La Flèche Wallonne
9th Brabantse Pijl
2003
1st Brabantse Pijl
2nd Amstel Gold Race
3rd Liège–Bastogne–Liège
4th Overall Tirreno–Adriatico
4th Züri-Metzgete
6th Road race, UCI Road World Championships
6th Overall Tour Méditerranéen
7th Overall Ronde van Nederland
8th Clásica de San Sebastián
9th Overall Volta a la Comunitat Valenciana
9th Tour of Flanders
10th Giro di Lombardia
2004
2nd Liège–Bastogne–Liège
2nd Giro di Lombardia
2nd Amstel Gold Race
2nd Brabantse Pijl
3rd Coppa Sabatini
4th Overall Tour Méditerranéen
5th Overall Ster Elekrotoer
6th Overall Tirreno–Adriatico
7th Road race, UCI Road World Championships

Voided results from 1 January 2005 to 31 December 2007.

2005
~~2nd Amstel Gold Race~~
~~3rd Liège–Bastogne–Liège~~
~~6th Overall Tour de Pologne~~
~~7th Overall Tour of the Basque Country~~
2006
~~1st Road race, National Road Championships~~
~~1st Peperbus Profspektakel~~
~~3rd Amstel Gold Race~~
~~4th Züri–Metzgete~~
~~5th Overall Tirreno–Adriatico~~
~~5th Liège–Bastogne–Liège~~
~~8th Giro di Lombardia~~
2007
~~1st Peperbus Profspektakel~~
~~3rd Overall 3-Länder-Tour~~
~~4th Road race, National Road Championships~~
~~5th Amstel Gold Race~~
~~6th Liège–Bastogne–Liège~~
~~6th Brabantse Pijl~~
~~9th Tour of Flanders~~
~~10th Overall Tirreno–Adriatico~~

=== Grand Tour general classification results timeline ===
Grand Tour	1995	1996	1997	1998	1999	2000	2001	2002	2003	2004	2005	2006	2007
Giro d'Italia	—	—	—	—	—	—	—	17	—	—	—	—	—
Tour de France	—	31	16	5	56	DNF	10	12	32	74	~~24~~	~~12~~	~~12~~
Vuelta a España	42	—	—	49	—	—	—	—	—	—	—	~~DNF~~	—

Legend
—	Did not compete
DNF	Did not finish

== See also ==
- List of Dutch Olympic cyclists

Sporting positions
Preceded by Maarten den Bakker; Léon van Bon	Dutch National Road Race Champion; 1997–1998; 2006	Succeeded by Maarten den Bakker; Koos Moerenhout
Preceded by Juan Carlos Domínguez; Laurent Jalabert	Winner of the Catalan Week; 1998; 2001	Succeeded by Laurent Jalabert; Juan Miguel Mercado
Preceded by Frank Vandenbroucke	Winner of Paris–Nice; 1999	Succeeded by Andreas Klöden
Preceded by Rolf Järmann	Winner of the Amstel Gold Race; 1999	Succeeded by Erik Zabel
Preceded by Johan Museeuw; Fabien De Waele	Winner of the Brabantse Pijl; 2001; 2003	Succeeded by Fabien De Waele; Luca Paolini
