= Peperbus Profspektakel =

Dutch cycling race

The Peperbus Profspektakel is a cycling criterium held in Zwolle, the Netherlands. The course is held within closed roads of the city center. The first edition was held in 1999, and is held annually on the third Wednesday after the Tour de France. The ladies edition was first introduced in the year 2008.

== List of winners ==
Year	Winner	Ladies
1999	(Italy) Mario Cipollini	N/A
2000	(Netherlands) Léon van Bon	N/A
2001	(Netherlands) Jans Koerts	N/A
2002	(Netherlands) Michael Boogerd	N/A
2003	(Netherlands) Rudie Kemna	N/A
2004	(Italy) Ivan Basso	N/A
2005	(Netherlands) Max van Heeswijk	N/A
2006	(Netherlands) Michael Boogerd	N/A
2007	(Netherlands) Michael Boogerd	N/A
2008	(Austria) Bernhard Kohl	(Netherlands) Irene van de Broek
2009	(Netherlands) Kenny van Hummel	(Netherlands) Marianne Vos
