= Enrico Cassani =

Italian cyclist

Personal information
- Born: 15 February 1972 (age 54) Melzo, Italy

Cycling career
- Sport: Cycling
- Discipline: Road
- Role: Rider

Professional teams
- 1997–2000: Team Polti
- 2001–2002: Domo–Farm Frites–Latexco
- 2003: Alessio

Enrico Cassani (born 15 February 1972) is an Italian former professional racing cyclist. He rode in four editions of the Giro d'Italia and three editions of the Tour de France.

== Major results ==
1997
10th Classic Haribo
1998
4th Grand Prix de Denain
5th Overall Étoile de Bessèges
6th Kuurne–Brussels–Kuurne
1999
2nd Overall 4 Jours de Dunkerque
5th Overall Ronde van Nederland
8th Trofeo Matteotti
2000
1st Stage 12 Giro d'Italia
5th Overall Regio-Tour
2002
3rd Classic Haribo
3rd Kuurne–Brussels–Kuurne
7th Tour of Flanders
10th Paris–Roubaix
2003
2nd Trofeo Pantalica
6th E3 Prijs Vlaanderen
6th Brabantse Pijl
