= 2001 Brabantse Pijl =

Race details
- Dates: 1 April 2001
- Stages: 1
- Distance: 194 km (120.5 mi)
- Winning time: 4h 31' 10"

Results
	Winner	Michael Boogerd (NED)
	Second	Scott Sunderland (AUS)
	Third	Axel Merckx (BEL)

The 2001 Brabantse Pijl was the 41st edition of the Brabantse Pijl cycle race and was held on 1 April 2001. The race started in Zaventem and finished in Alsemberg. The race was won by Michael Boogerd.

== General classification ==
Final general classification

Rank	Rider	Time
1	Michael Boogerd (NED)	4h 31' 10"
2	Scott Sunderland (AUS)	s.t.
3	Axel Merckx (BEL)	s.t.
4	Dave Bruylandts (BEL)	+ 6"
5	Ludo Dierckxsens (BEL)	+ 15"
6	Marc Lotz (NED)	s.t.
7	Geert Verheyen (BEL)	+ 29"
8	Davide Casarotto (ITA)	+ 38"
9	Karsten Kroon (NED)	+ 1' 12"
10	Daniele Nardello (ITA)	+ 1' 16"
