= Geert Verheyen =

Belgian cyclist

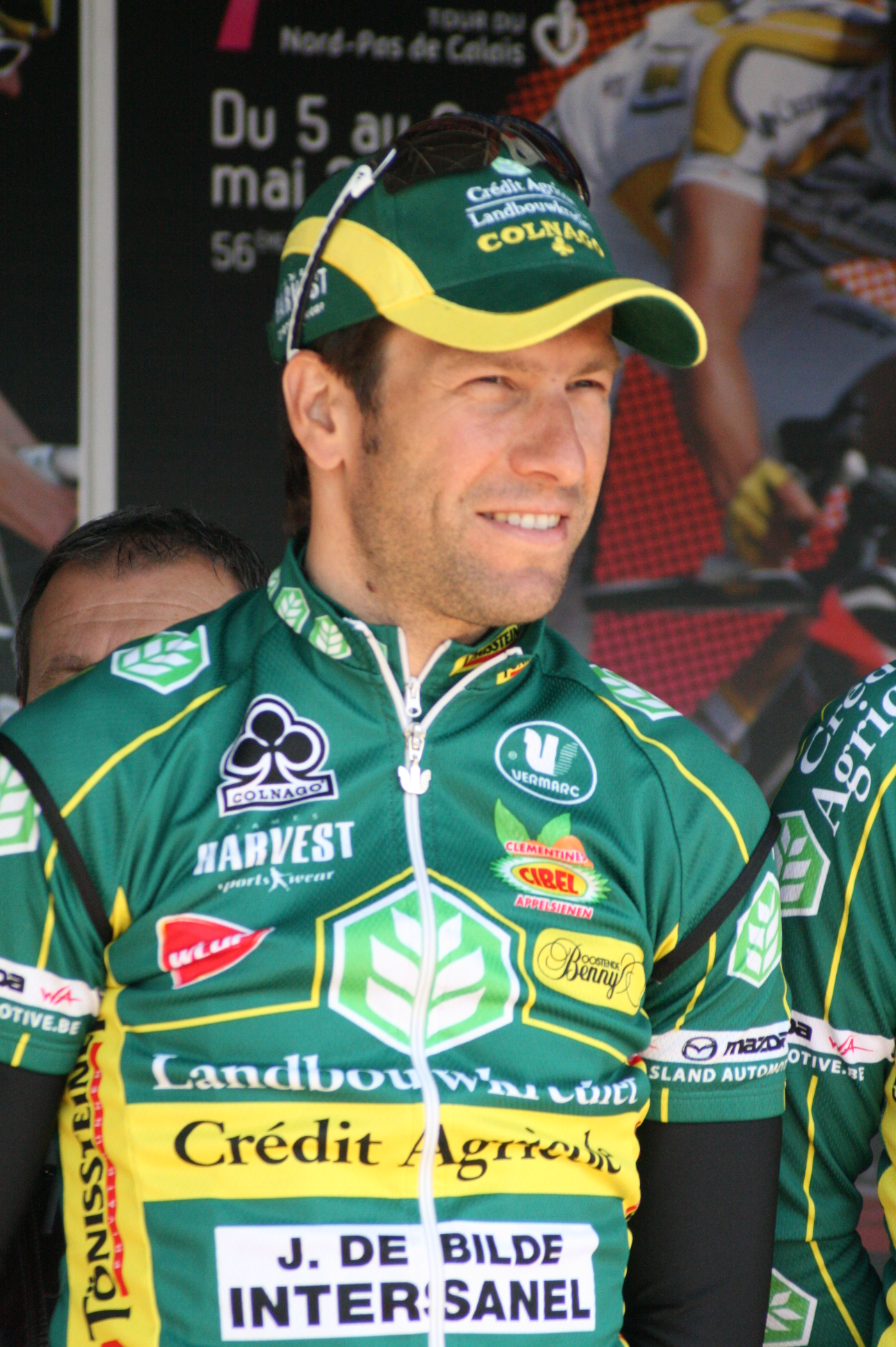

Personal information
- Full name: Geert Verheyen
- Born: 10 March 1973 (age 53) Diest, Belgium
- Height: 1.78 m (5 ft 10 in)
- Weight: 68 kg (150 lb)

Cycling career
- Sport: Cycling
- Current team: Retired
- Discipline: Road
- Role: Rider

Professional teams
- 1994–1997: Vlaanderen 2002–Eddy Merckx
- 1998–2000: Lotto–Mobistar
- 2001–2002: Rabobank
- 2003–2004: Marlux–Wincor Nixdorf
- 2005: Landbouwkrediet–Colnago
- 2006–2007: Quick-Step–Innergetic
- 2008: Mitsubishi–Jartazi
- 2009–2011: Landbouwkrediet–Colnago

Geert Verheyen (Dutch pronunciation: [ˈɣeːrt fərˈɦɛiə(n)]; (Note: In isolation, Verheyen is pronounced [vərˈɦɛiə(n)].) born 10 March 1973) is a former Belgian professional road racing cyclist who competed as a professional between 1994 and 2011. He was born in Diest, and is the cousin of cyclist David Verheyen.

He turned professional in 1994, racing for Vlaanderen 2002-Eddy Merckx. In 1998 he went on to race for the UCI Professional Continental team, Lotto, and later Rabobank, Marlux, Chocolade Jacques and Colnago. He competed in the 1998 Tour de France and the 2006 Volta a Catalunya.

== Major results ==
1993
3rd Circuit de Wallonie
1994
3rd Seraing-Aachen-Seraing
5th Nationale Sluitingprijs
7th Ronde van Limburg
1996
6th Overall Tour of Austria
7th Omloop van de Westhoek
10th Grand Prix Cerami
10th Omloop van het Waasland
1998
1st Grand Prix de la Ville de Lillers
5th Route Adélie
1999
2nd Grand Prix d'Isbergues
4th Overall Route du Sud

1st Stage 2

5th Clásica de Almería
7th Kampioenschap van Vlaanderen
10th Overall Paris–Nice
10th GP Ouest–France
2000
6th Le Samyn
10th Brabantse Pijl
2001
1st Luk-Cup Bühl
7th Brabantse Pijl
2002
10th Coppa Sabatini
10th Brabantse Pijl
2003
2nd Schaal Sels
4th Paris–Bourges
5th Dwars door Vlaanderen
6th Nationale Sluitingprijs
10th Overall Circuit Franco-Belge

1st Stage 4

10th GP Nobili Rubinetterie
2004
3rd Road race, National Road Championships
6th Grand Prix de Wallonie
2005
1st Flèche Hesbignonne
2006
4th Grand Prix Pino Cerami
2010
2nd Rund um den Finanzplatz Eschborn–Frankfurt
8th Grand Prix Pino Cerami

=== Grand Tour general classification results timeline ===
Grand Tour	1998	1999	2000	2001	2002	2003	2004	2005	2006	2007
Giro d'Italia	—	—	—	—	47	—	48	—	—	—
Tour de France	23	45	20	72	—	—	—	—	—	—
Vuelta a España	—	—	—	40	—	—	—	—	—	46

Legend
—	Did not compete
DNF	Did not finish
