= 2003 Brabantse Pijl =

Race details
- Dates: 30 March 2003
- Stages: 1
- Distance: 192.5 km (119.6 mi)
- Winning time: 4h 31' 00"

Results
| | Winner | Michael Boogerd (NED) |
| | Second | Óscar Freire (ESP) |
| | Third | Luca Paolini (ITA) |

The 2003 Brabantse Pijl was the 43rd edition of the Brabantse Pijl cycle race and was held on 30 March 2003. The race started in Zaventem and finished in Alsemberg. The race was won by Michael Boogerd.

== General classification ==
Final general classification

| Rank | Rider | Time |
|---|---|---|
| 1 | Michael Boogerd (NED) | 4h 31' 00" |
| 2 | Óscar Freire (ESP) | + 9" |
| 3 | Luca Paolini (ITA) | s.t. |
| 4 | Dave Bruylandts (BEL) | s.t. |
| 5 | Romāns Vainšteins (LAT) | + 2' 09" |
| 6 | Enrico Cassani (ITA) | + 2' 20" |
| 7 | Kurt Asle Arvesen (NOR) | s.t. |
| 8 | Kim Kirchen (LUX) | s.t. |
| 9 | Serge Baguet (BEL) | s.t. |
| 10 | Alberto Ongarato (ITA) | s.t. |
