= 2002 Brabantse Pijl =

Race details
- Dates: 27 March 2002
- Stages: 1
- Distance: 192.5 km (119.6 mi)
- Winning time: 4h 30' 10"

Results
	Winner	Fabien De Waele (BEL)
	Second	Erwin Thijs (BEL)
	Third	Chris Peers (BEL)

The 2002 Brabantse Pijl was the 42nd edition of the Brabantse Pijl cycle race and was held on 27 March 2002. The race started in Zaventem and finished in Alsemberg. The race was won by Fabien De Waele.

== General classification ==
Final general classification

Rank	Rider	Time
1	Fabien De Waele (BEL)	4h 30' 10"
2	Erwin Thijs (BEL)	s.t.
3	Chris Peers (BEL)	s.t.
4	Elio Aggiano (ITA)	+ 5"
5	Wim Vansevenant (BEL)	s.t.
6	Serge Baguet (BEL)	s.t.
7	Cristian Moreni (ITA)	s.t.
8	Dave Bruylandts (BEL)	+ 8"
9	Michael Boogerd (NED)	+ 9"
10	Geert Verheyen (BEL)	+ 23"
