= 2000 Brabantse Pijl =

Race details
- Dates: 26 March 2000
- Stages: 1
- Distance: 194 km (120.5 mi)
- Winning time: 4h 33' 43"

Results
	Winner	Johan Museeuw (BEL)
	Second	Nico Mattan (BEL)
	Third	Rolf Sørensen (DEN)

The 2000 Brabantse Pijl was the 40th edition of the Brabantse Pijl cycle race and was held on 26 March 2000. The race started in Zaventem and finished in Alsemberg. The race was won by Johan Museeuw.

== General classification ==
Final general classification

Rank	Rider	Time
1	Johan Museeuw (BEL)	4h 33' 43"
2	Nico Mattan (BEL)	+ 7"
3	Rolf Sørensen (DEN)	+ 10"
4	Ruggero Marzoli (ITA)	+ 1' 38"
5	Wilfried Peeters (BEL)	+ 1' 43"
6	Peter Farazijn (BEL)	s.t.
7	Jesper Skibby (DEN)	s.t.
8	Michael Boogerd (NED)	s.t.
9	Martin Hvastija (SLO)	s.t.
10	Geert Verheyen (BEL)	s.t.
