= David Verheyen =

Belgian cyclist

Personal information
- Full name: David Verheyen
- Born: 15 September 1981 (age 45) Diest, Belgium

Cycling career
- Sport: Cycling
- Discipline: Road
- Role: Rider

Professional teams
- Jan–31 Jul 2005: Profel Cycling Team
- 1 Aug 2005–2006: Landbouwkrediet–Colnago
- 2007: Landbouwkrediet–Tönissteiner

David Verheyen (born 15 September 1981) is a Belgian professional road racing cyclist who currently races for UCI Professional Continental team Mitsubishi–Jartazi. He was born in Diest, and is the cousin of cyclist Geert Verheyen. He turned professional in 2006 having ridden the 2005 season as a trainee.

== Palmarès ==
2004
3rd Stage 5, Tour de Namur, Florennes (BEL)
