= Maarten den Bakker =

Dutch cyclist

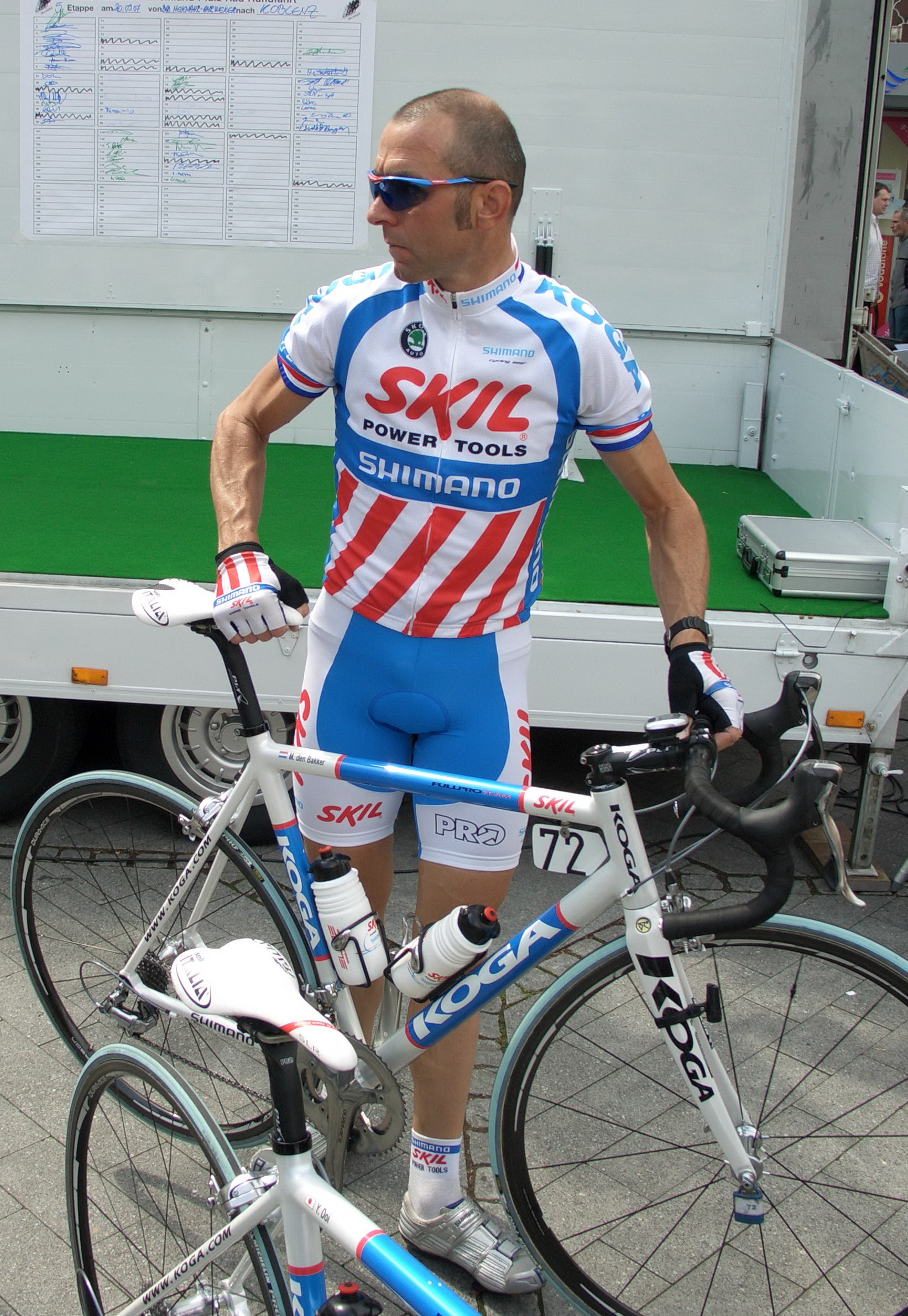

Personal information
- Full name: Maarten Jan den Bakker
- Born: 26 January 1969 (age 57) Abbenbroek, Netherlands
- Height: 1.81 m (5 ft 11 1/2 in)
- Weight: 71 kg (157 lb; 11 st 3 lb)

Cycling career
- Sport: Cycling
- Discipline: Road
- Role: Rider
- Rider type: All-rounder

Professional teams
- 1990–1992: PDM–Concorde–Ultima
- 1992–1997: TVM–Sanyo
- 1998–2005: Rabobank
- 2006: Team Milram
- 2007–2008: Skil–Shimano
- 2009: Van Vliet–EBH Elshof

Major wins
- National Road Race Championships (1996, 1999)

Maarten Jan den Bakker (born 26 January 1969) is a retired road bicycle racer from the Netherlands, who was a professional rider from 1990 to 2008. He won the Dutch National Road Race Championships twice and he participated in nine Tours de France, completing each of them. In 2008, Den Bakker ended his career. He also competed in the team time trial at the 1988 Summer Olympics.

== Career achievements ==
=== Major results ===
1989
2nd Overall Olympia's Tour
1990
5th Brussels–Ingooigem
1991
5th Overall Tirreno–Adriatico
1993
2nd Overall Tour de Luxembourg

1st Stage 4

2nd Veenendaal–Veenendaal
1994
1st Nationale Sluitingprijs
2nd Overall Tour de l'Avenir

1st Stage 3

2nd Brabantse Pijl
9th Overall Vuelta a Andalucía
10th Giro di Lombardia
1995
2nd Grand Prix de Wallonie
2nd Overall Tour of Galicia
3rd Road race, National Road Championships
5th Züri Metzgete
8th Overall Ronde van Nederland
10th Liège–Bastogne–Liège
10th Brabantse Pijl
1996
1st Road race, National Road Championships
1st Stage 5 Vuelta a Andalucía
4th Brabantse Pijl
8th Overall Ronde van Nederland
1997
2nd Brabantse Pijl
4th GP Rik Van Steenbergen
6th Overall Route du Sud
7th GP de Suisse
1998
3rd Paris–Bourges
2nd Amstel Gold Race
4th La Flèche Wallonne
7th Rund um den Henninger Turm
8th Overall GP Tell

1st Stage 2

9th Liège–Bastogne–Liège
10th Overall Ronde van Nederland
1999
1st Road race, National Road Championships
2nd La Flèche Wallonne
3rd Liège–Bastogne–Liège
4th Amstel Gold Race
6th Gran Premio Bruno Beghelli
6th Delta Profronde
6th Overall Paris–Nice
8th Overall Ronde van Nederland

1st Stage 5

8th Overall Three Days of Bruges–De Panne
9th Dwars door Vlaanderen
2000
3rd Time trial, National Road Championships
5th Overall Three Days of Bruges–De Panne
6th Rund um den Henninger Turm
7th GP Ouest-France
8th Liège–Bastogne–Liège
10th Overall Guldensporentweedaagse
2001
7th Omloop Het Volk
8th Overall Ronde van Nederland
10th Luk-Cup Bühl
2003
1st Time trial, National Road Championships
1st Stage 4 UNIQA Classic
5th Ronde van Midden-Zeeland
6th Overall Tour of Belgium
8th Tour Beneden-Maas
2004
8th Kuurne–Brussels–Kuurne
2005
4th Schaal Sels
2007
1st Profronde van Fryslan
3rd Road race, National Road Championships
7th Nationale Sluitingprijs
10th Overall Tour of Belgium
2008
1st Stage 1b (TTT) Brixia Tour

=== Grand Tour general classification results timeline ===
Year	Giro d'Italia	Tour de France	Vuelta a España
1992		92nd	
1993		91st	71st
1994			Not finished
1995		52nd	
1996		64th	40th
1997		64th	Not finished
1998		33rd	
1999		84th	
2000		49th	
2001		75th	
2004			84th

Sporting positions
Preceded by Servais Knaven; Michael Boogerd	Dutch National Road Race Champion; 1996; 1999	Succeeded by Michael Boogerd; Léon van Bon

== See also ==
- List of Dutch Olympic cyclists
