= Fabien De Waele =

Belgian cyclist

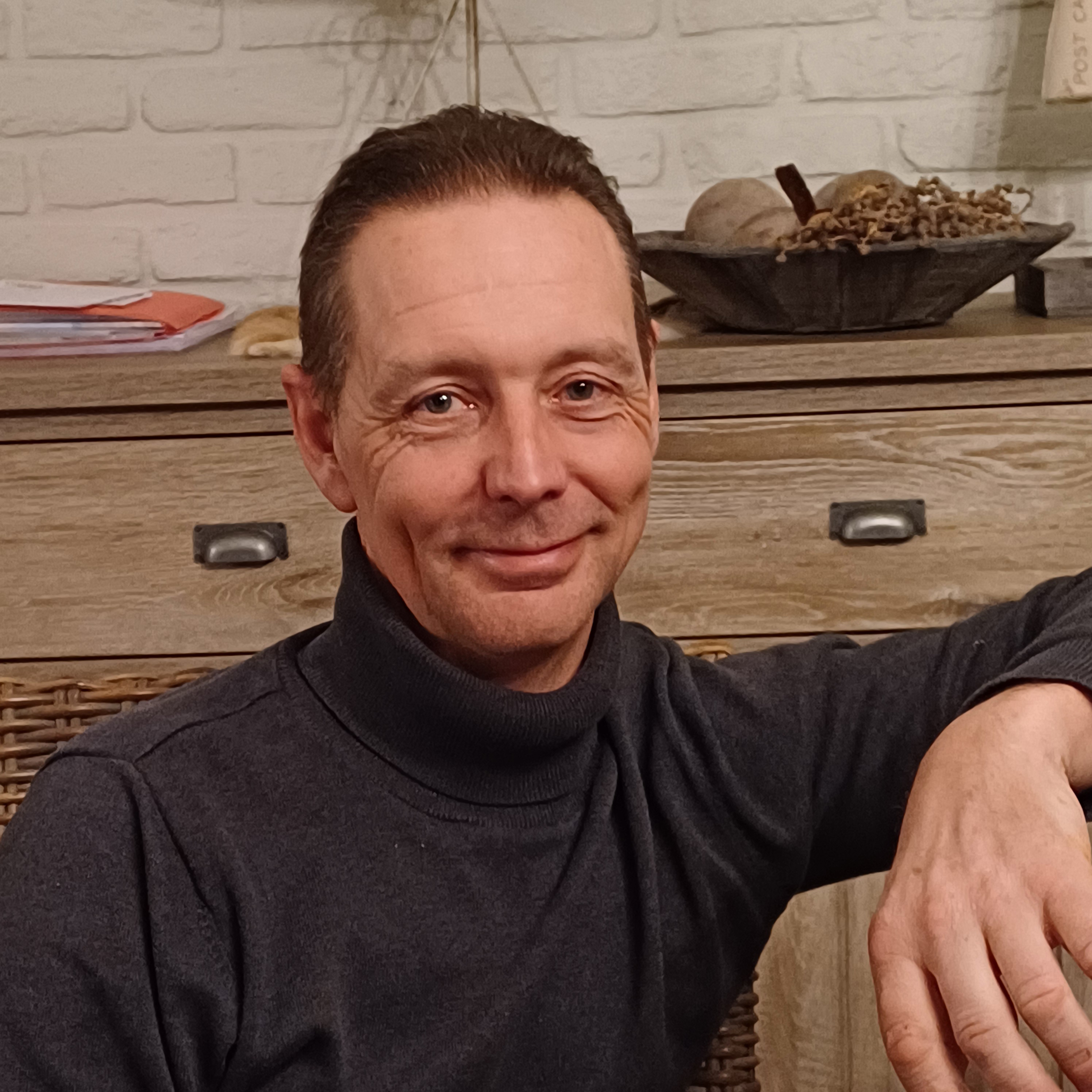

Personal information
- Born: 19 May 1975 (age 51) Oudenaarde, Belgium

Cycling career
- Sport: Cycling
- Discipline: Road
- Role: Rider
- Rider type: Hilly races

Professional teams
- 1996: Lotto-Isoglass
- 1997–1999: Lotto–Mobistar
- 2000–2001: Lotto–Adecco
- 2002: Mapei–Quick·Step
- 2003: Palmans–Collstrop

Major wins
- One-day races and Classics Brabantse Pijl (2002)

Fabien De Waele (born 19 May 1975 in Oudenaarde) is a Belgian former professional cyclist. He achieved his biggest victory in 2002 by winning the Brabantse Pijl.

== Major victories ==
1996
1st Vlaamse Pijl
1st Circuit de Wallonie
1997
10th Japan Cup
1998
1st Japan Cup
8th Nokere Koerse
9th Druivenkoers Overijse
1999
3rd Sparkassen Giro Bochum
5th Grand Prix d'Ouverture La Marseillaise
8th Cholet-Pays de Loire
9th Overall Étoile de Bessèges
2000
3rd Omloop van het Houtland Lichtervelde
9th Overall Étoile de Bessèges
2001
1st Stage 1 Paris–Nice
1st Stage 1 Critérium du Dauphiné Libéré
2nd Road race, National Road Championships
5th Omloop Het Volk
6th Tour du Haut Var
2002
1st Brabantse Pijl
2003
7th Vlaamse Havenpijl
