= Léon van Bon =

Dutch cyclist (born 1972)

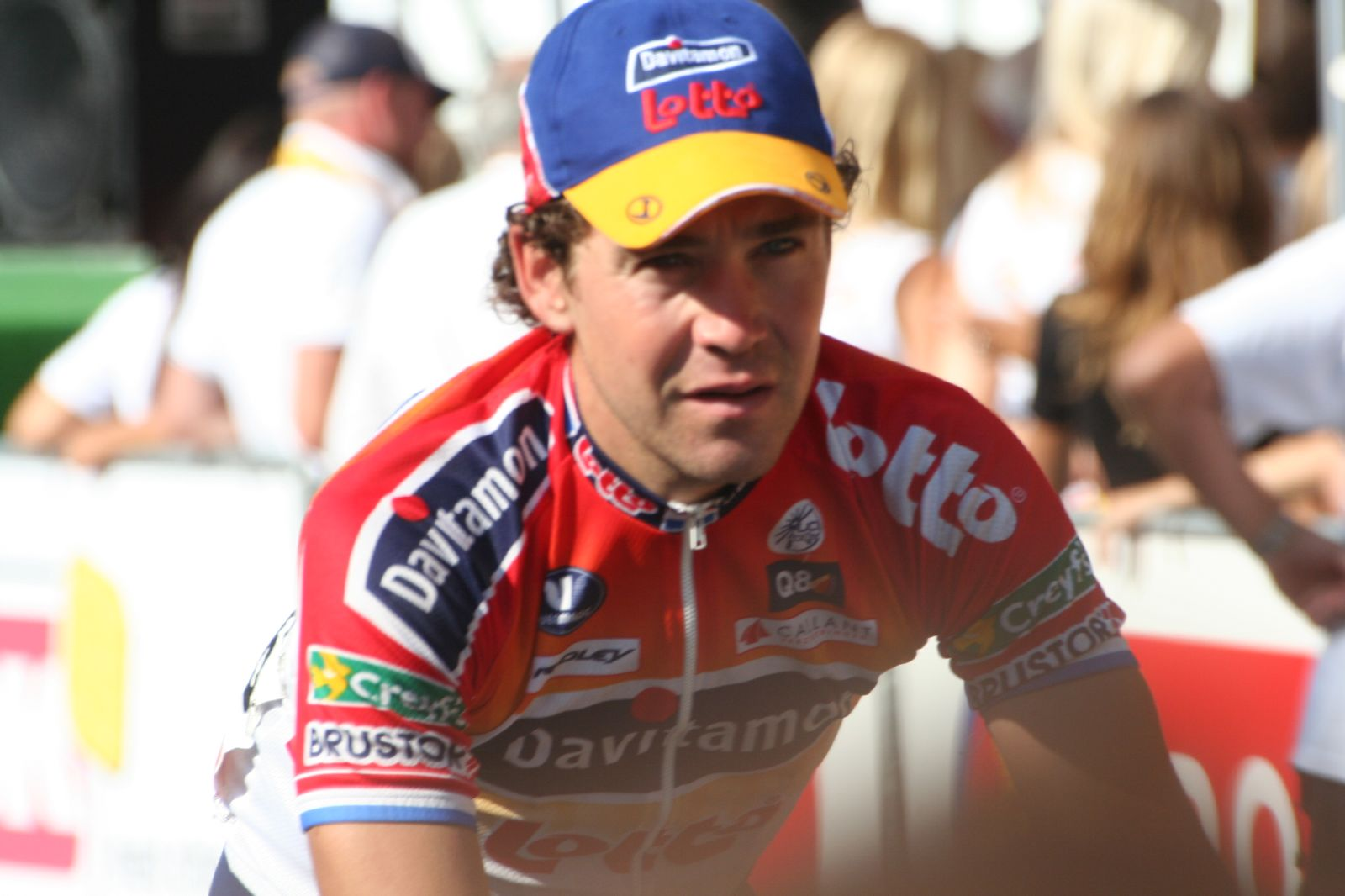

Personal information
- Full name: Léon Hendrik Jan van Bon
- Born: 28 January 1972 (age 54) Asperen, Gelderland, Netherlands
- Height: 1.76 m (5 ft 9 1/2 in)
- Weight: 70 kg (154 lb; 11 st 0 lb)

Cycling career
- Sport: Cycling
- Current team: Retired
- Discipline: Road
- Role: Rider

Professional teams
- 1994–2000: WordPerfect–Colnago–Decca
- 2001: Mercury
- 2002–2006: Lotto–Adecco
- 2007: Rabobank
- 2008–2013: Trek–Marco Polo

Major wins
- Tour de France, 2 stages Vuelta a España, 1 stage HEW Cyclassics (1998); Ronde van Nederland (2001)
Medal record
Men's track cycling
Representing the Netherlands
Olympic Games
Silver medal – second place	1992 Barcelona	Points race
Men's road bicycle racing
UCI Road World Championships
Bronze medal – third place	1997 San Sebastian	Elite men's road race

Léon Hendrik Jan van Bon (born 28 January 1972) is a retired road racing cyclist from the Netherlands, who won the silver medal in the men's points race at the 1992 Summer Olympics in Barcelona, Spain. He won his first major race at the professionals in 1998, winning the HEW Cyclassics. In 2001 he claimed the overall-victory in the Ronde van Nederland. Van Bon retired in 2013.

After the racing career he became a sports photographer, covering major road cycling events.

== Major results ==
1988
U17 Pursuit Champion
U17 Sprint Champion
1989
U19 Pursuit Champion
U19 Points Race Champion
U19 Sprint Champion
1990
U19 Points Race Champion
U19 Sprint Champion
(silver) World U19 Points Race Championship
1991
Amateur Points Race Champion
2nd, National Time Trial Championship
2nd, National Amateur Pursuit Championship
1992
Madison Champion
Amateur Points Race Champion
2nd, Olympic Games, Points Race
2nd, National Amateur Pursuit Championship
2nd, Overall, Olympia's Tour

Winner Prologue

1993
1st, Stages 1 & 7, Tour de l'Avenir
1994
1st, Tour de la Haute-Sambre
2nd, National Points Race Championship
1995
1st, Stage 7, DuPont Tour
3rd, Overall, PostGirot Open
1996
1st, Overall, Wien-Rabenstein-Gresten-Wien
1st, Stage 4, DuPont Tour
1st, Stage 1, Tirreno–Adriatico
1997
1st, Omloop der Vlaamse Ardennen
1st, Amsterdam RAI Derny Race
1st, Stage 18, Vuelta a España
(bronze) UCI Road World Championships, Road race
9th, Paris–Tours
1998
1st, HEW Cyclassics
1st, Stage 9, Tour de France
2nd, World Cup
3rd, National Road Race Championship
4th, Paris–Roubaix
8th, Clásica de San Sebastián
1999
1st, Stage 1, Prudential Tour
6th, Milan–San Remo
6th, Paris–Roubaix
6th, Amstel Gold Race
8th, Paris–Tours
2000
Dutch National Road Race Championship
1st, Ronde van Midden-Zeeland
1st, Stage 6, Tour de France
7th, Tour of Flanders
Peperbus Profspektakel
2001
1st, Overall, Ronde van Nederland
1st, First Union Invitational
2nd, Gent–Wevelgem
2002
1st, Stage 4, Tour de Suisse
2003
1st, Veenendaal–Veenendaal
1st, Stage 3, Deutschland Tour
2004
1st, Stage 3, Paris–Nice
1st, Stage 5, Ronde van Nederland
4th, Tour of Flanders
7th, Paris–Roubaix
10th, World Cup
2005
National Road Race Championships
6th, Paris–Roubaix
8th, Tour of Flanders
2007
1st, Nokere Koerse
2012
3rd National Track Championships, Madison (with Geert Jan Jonkman)

== See also ==
- List of Dutch Olympic cyclists

Sporting positions
Preceded by Maarten den Bakker; Erik Dekker	Dutch National Road Race Champion; 2000; 2005	Succeeded by Jans Koerts; Michael Boogerd
