= Visma–Lease a Bike (men's team) =

Dutch cycling team

Team information
- UCI code: TVL
- Registered: Netherlands
- Founded: 1984
- Discipline: Road
- Status: UCI WorldTeam
- Bicycles: Colnago (1984–2008); Giant (2009–2013); Bianchi (2014–2020); Cervélo (2021–)
- Components: SRAM Corporation
- Website: Team home page

Key personnel
- General manager: Richard Plugge

Team name history
1984–1986	Kwantum–Decosol
1987–1989	Superconfex–Yoko
1990–1992	Buckler–Colnago
1993–1994	WordPerfect
1995	Novell
1996–2012	Rabobank
2013	Blanco
2013–2014	Belkin
2015–2018	LottoNL–Jumbo
2019–2023	Jumbo–Visma
2024–	Visma–Lease a Bike

Visma–Lease a Bike is a Dutch professional bicycle racing team, successor of the former Rabobank. The team consists of four sections: ProTeam (the UCI WorldTeam team), Women's Team (the UCI Women's Team), Development Team (a UCI Continental team racing in the UCI Europe Tour), and cyclo-cross.

The cycling team was founded for the 1984 season under the name Kwantum–Decosol, anchored by Jan Raas, with mostly cyclists coming from the TI–Raleigh cycling team. With Raas as directeur sportif from 1985 onwards, the head sponsor was succeeded by Superconfex, Buckler, WordPerfect and Novell, respectively, before Raas signed a contract with Rabobank, a Dutch association of credit unions, in 1996. After Rabobank sponsorship ended in 2012, it was known as Blanco, Belkin, Lotto–Jumbo, Jumbo–Visma and now Visma–Lease a Bike.

Since 1984, the team has entered every Tour de France and since the introduction of divisions in 1998, the team has always been in the first division. A 2012 investigation by Dutch newspaper de Volkskrant concluded that doping was at least tolerated, from the team's 1996 beginnings as Rabobank until at least 2007.

Team Jumbo–Visma cyclist Jonas Vingegaard won the 2022 Tour de France, delivering the team its first Tour de France victory in the General Classification, as well as the King of the Mountains title while his team-mate Wout van Aert won the Points Classification title. In 2023, Vingegaard repeated his feat and Jumbo–Visma won the team classification for the first time. That year, fellow Jumbo–Visma riders Primož Roglič and Sepp Kuss also won the Giro d'Italia and the Vuelta a España respectively, making the team the first to win all three Grand Tours in a single calendar year.

== History ==
In road bicycle racing, teams usually take their names from their main sponsors. The team has had the following sponsors, and thus names.

=== Kwantum–Decosol–Yoko (1984–1986) ===
After the season of 1983, the TI–Raleigh team split up because of tension between former world champion Jan Raas and team leader Peter Post, with seven cyclists following Post to the new Panasonic-team and six cyclists joining Raas to the Kwantum team. The team captains of the Kwantum team were Guillaume Driessens, Jan Gisbers and Walter Godefroot. In their first year, the team managed to win the intermediate sprints classification and one stage in the 1984 Tour de France, the Amstel Gold Race and the Dutch national road championship.

After the 1984 season, Jan Raas stopped as an active cyclist and became team manager. In 1985 the Kwantum team had a successful year. Victories included two Tour de France stages, the Tour of Luxembourg, Paris–Tours, Paris–Brussels, the Tirreno–Adriatico, the Tour of Belgium, again the Dutch national road championship, and the World cycling championship (Joop Zoetemelk). 1986 was less successful; the most important victory was Tour of Belgium.

=== Superconfex–Yoko–Colnago (1987–1989) ===
For the 1987 season, the main sponsor became Superconfex. In that year, the team was officially known as Superconfex – Kwantum – Yoko – Colnago. Jan Raas remained the team leader. After a victory in Kuurne–Brussels–Kuurne for Ludo Peeters, the new sprinter Jean-Paul van Poppel, coming from the Skala cycling team, gave the team a great year, with five stage wins in the Tour de France (of which two for van Poppel) and the victory in the points classification in the Tour de France for Jean-Paul van Poppel. Joop Zoetemelk ended his career with a victory in the Amstel Gold Race.

From 1988 on, the team was known as Superconfex – Yoko – Opel – Colnago. 1988 was also a successful season for the team, with victories in Paris–Brussels, the Tour of Ireland, the Tour of Belgium, the Amstel Gold Race, and six stages in the Tour de France. In the 1989 season, Jean-Paul van Poppel changed to the Panasonic team. In 1989 his sprinting capacities were missed, and the number of victories was reduced. Still, Paris–Brussels, the Tour of Flanders and Paris–Tours were won, together with two stages in the 1989 Tour de France.

=== Buckler–Colnago–Decca (1990–1992) ===
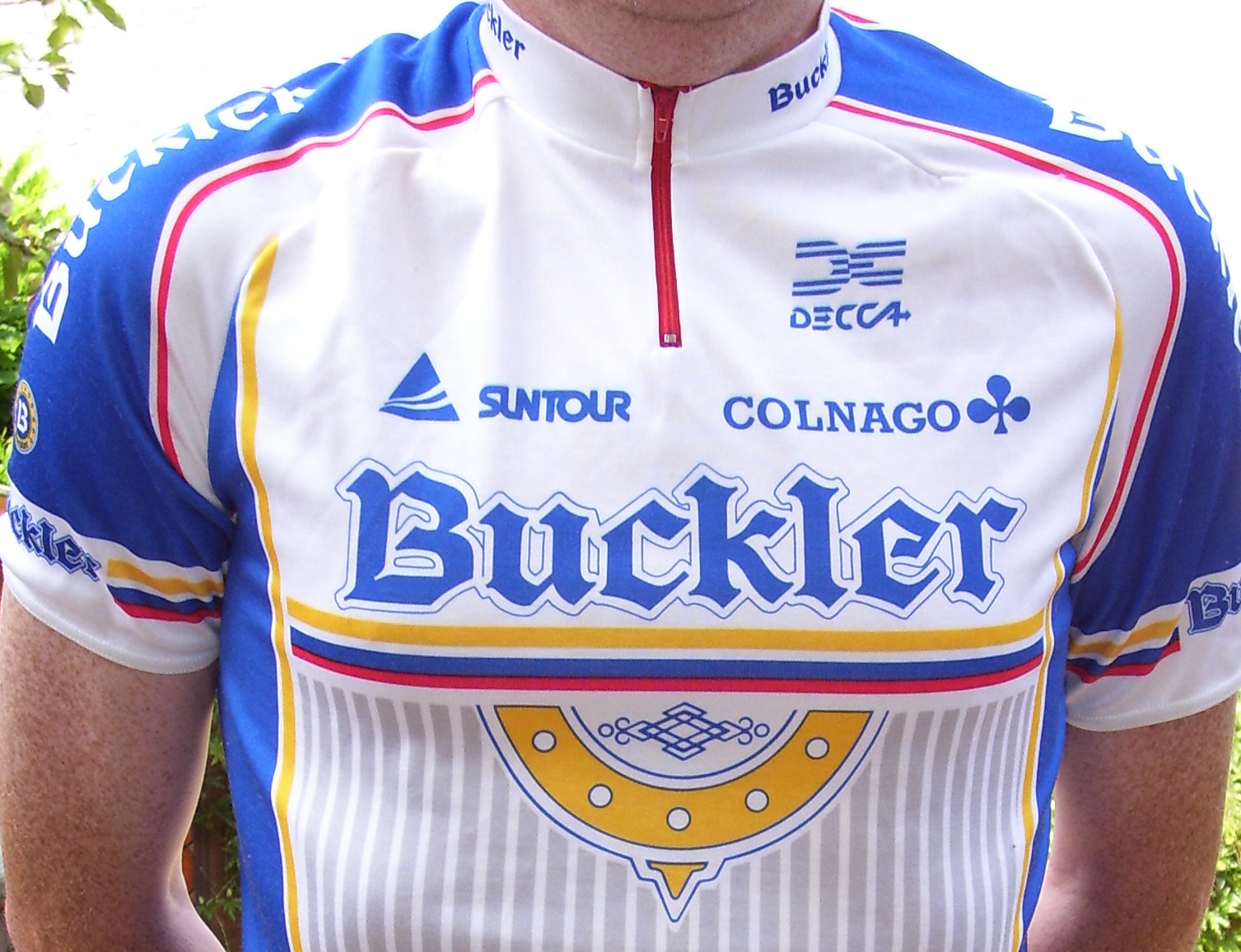
A Buckler jersey

After the 1989 season, the main sponsoring was taken over by Buckler. The Tour of Belgium was won again, and the Ronde van Nederland was won as well. That year, the team had the winner of the Dutch national road race championships again, as Peter Winnen won the race. In 1991, the team won the Amstel Gold Race, the Ronde van Nederland and Tour of Flanders. The team had taken over Steven Rooks from the Panasonic team, who immediately became the Dutch national road race champion.

The worst year in the team's history was 1992. Only 26 races were won in the season, compared to 64 victories in the successful 1988 season. 1992 also saw a young Erik Dekker entering the team. After that season, Buckler decided to stop sponsoring.

=== Wordperfect–Colnago–Decca (1993–1994) ===
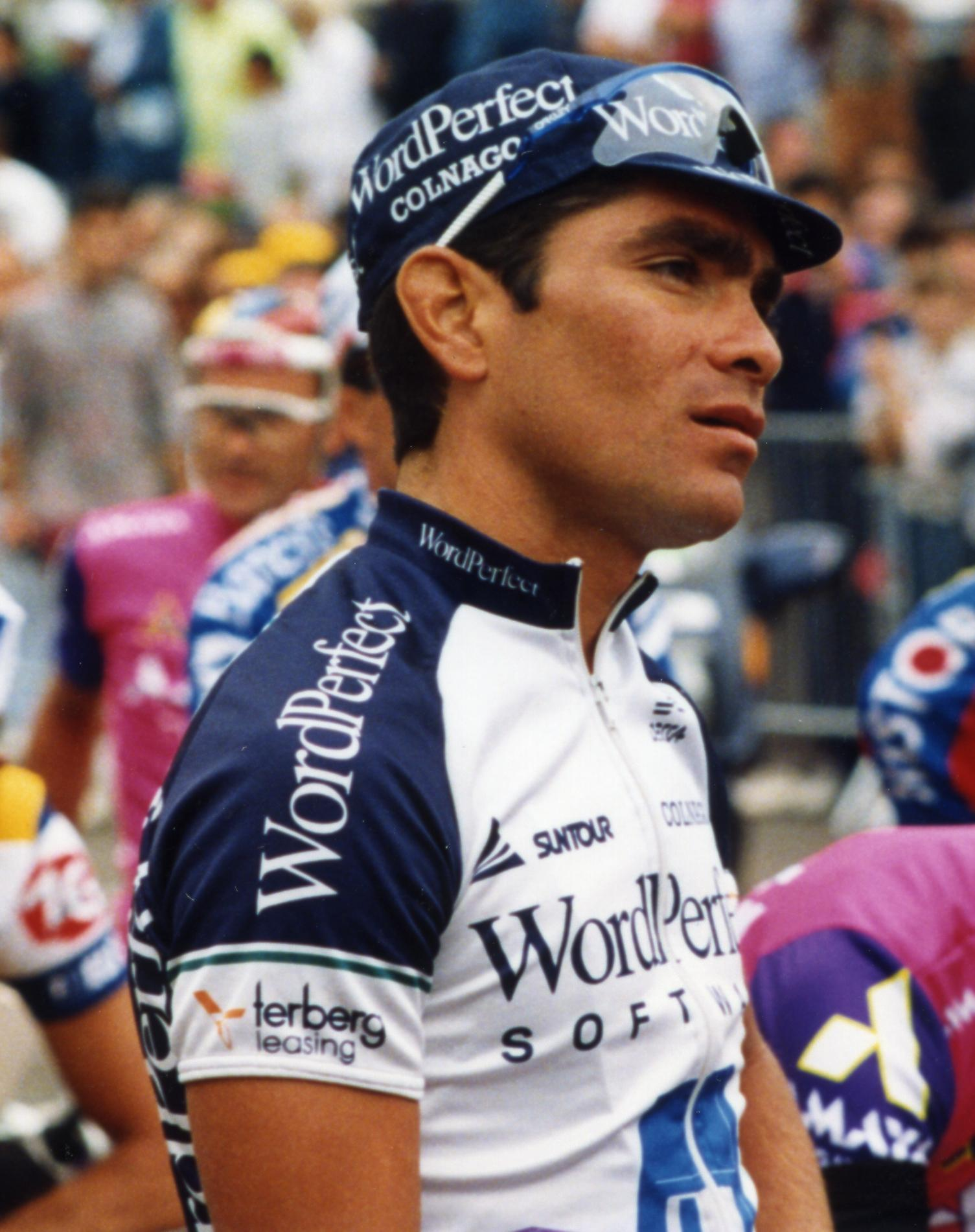
Raúl Alcalá with Wordperfect in 1993

A new sponsor was found in WordPerfect. Steven Rooks left the team, and Raúl Alcalá joined the team. Still, the 1993 season did not turn out well, with only 29 victories, the most important being Three Days of De Panne and the Tour DuPont. In 1993 and 1994, Michael Boogerd and Léon van Bon started their professional career in the team, and Viatcheslav Ekimov also came. The Tour DuPont was won again, together with the Tour de Luxembourg. The year still was disappointing with only 25 victories.

=== Novell–Decca (1995) ===
In 1995, the team was joined by Djamolidine Abdoujaparov, the winner of the points classification in the 1994 Tour de France. Abdoujaparov won one stage in the Tour de France, but other than that, the year was still not what the sponsors had hoped, so a new sponsor had to be found. The title sponsor of the previous two years, WordPerfect, was a product of Novell Software, which carried the team's name this one season.

=== Rabobank (1996–2012) ===
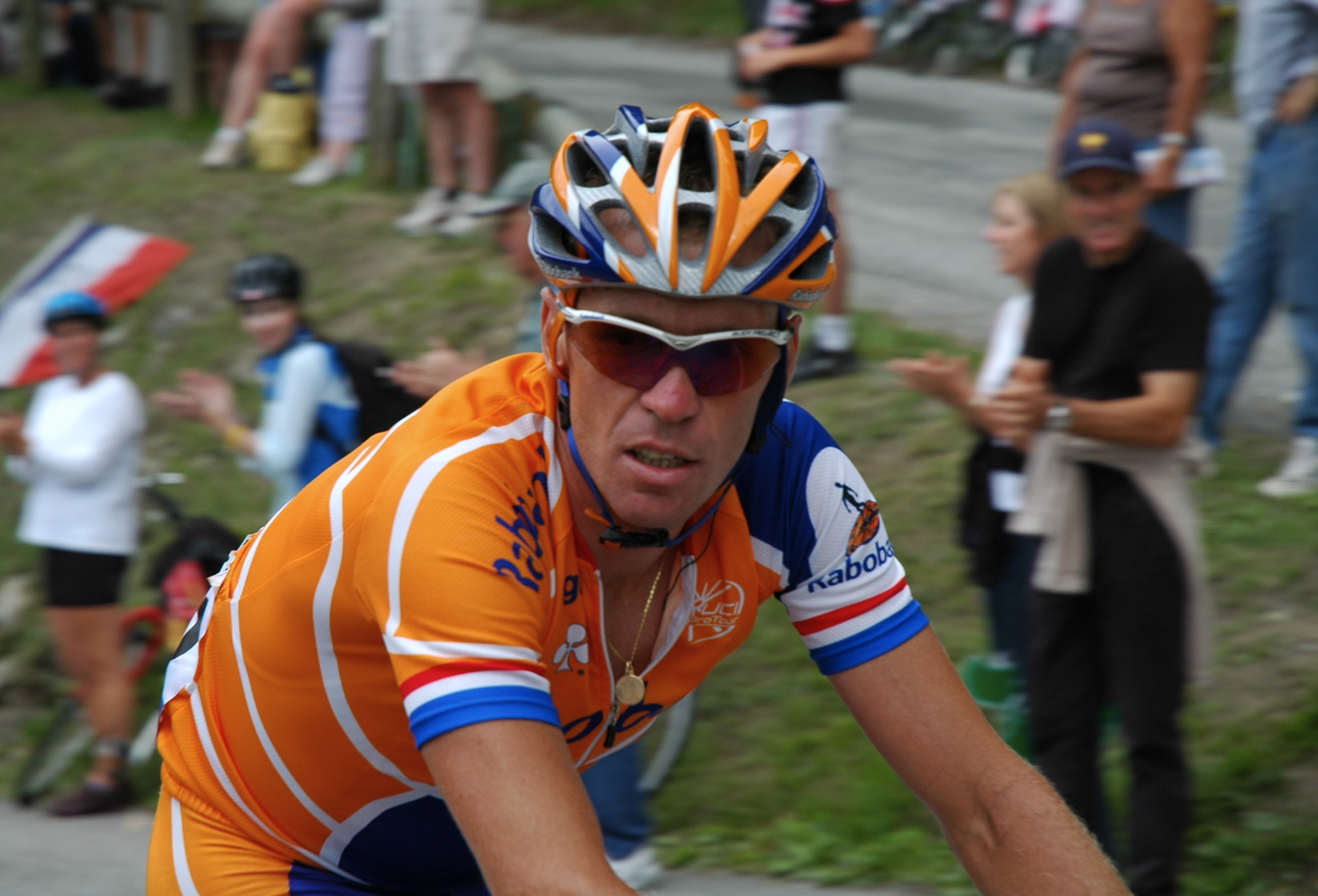
Erik Dekker at the 2005 Tour de France

Raas became the team manager of the Rabobank team while Theo de Rooy, Adrie van Houwelingen and Zoetemelk were directeur sportifs. As a Dutch cycling team, the team signed many of the prominent Dutch cyclists of the 1990s including Adri van der Poel, Richard Groenendaal and Erik Breukink as well as keeping the prominent Dutch cyclists from the Novell team that included Léon van Bon, Erik Dekker and Michael Boogerd. In addition, the team had many successful cyclists of other nationalities such as Edwig van Hooydonck, Rolf Sørensen, Johan Bruyneel and Robbie McEwen.

The Rabobank team dominated the Dutch national championships over several disciplines, and had world champions in both cyclo-cross (Adri van der Poel in 1996, Richard Groenendaal in 2000 and Sven Nys in 2004) and road racing (Óscar Freire in 2004).

In the 2000 cyclo-cross world championships there was a conflict between the commercial team interests and the national team interests. Groenendaal attacked during the first lap and was chased by defending cyclo-cross world champion Mario De Clercq who was followed by Groenendaal's Rabobank teammate Sven Nys. Team manager Jan Raas allegedly told Nys not to cooperate in the chase and De Clercq was unable to catch Groenendaal. Nys received much criticism from the Belgian team manager Erik De Vlaeminck as well as the Belgian public.

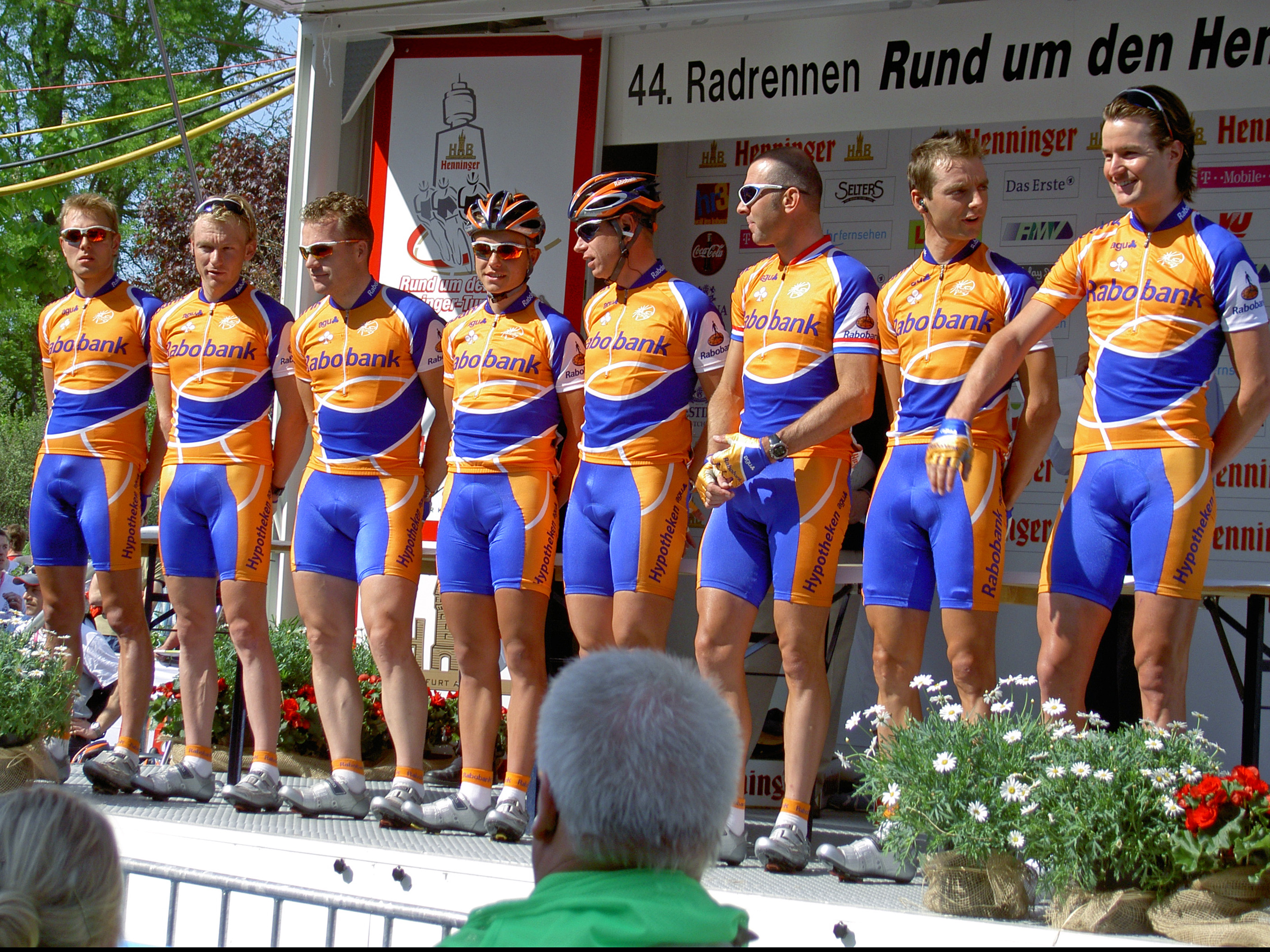
The Rabobank team during the 2005 Rund um den Henninger Turm race

Jan Raas was the team manager for the first eight years of the team's existence. In 2003 Raas was removed rather abruptly which surprised the other members of staff including Theo De Rooy, Erik Dekker and Michael Boogerd. De Rooy was promoted to team manager and a former Rabobank rider, who had been working as a PR man for Rabobank, Erik Breukink, was named as the new directeur sportif to replace De Rooy. In August 2007 in the aftermath of the affair in which Michael Rasmussen was removed during the 2007 Tour de France, De Rooy resigned from his position as team manager.

Following the United States Anti-Doping Agency (USADA) report on doping in professional cycling in October 2012, Rabobank announced it would end its sponsorship of professional cycling at the end of 2012. Rabobank said that doping was so rampant that it was "no longer convinced the international professional world of cycling can make this a clean and fair sport."

=== Blanco then Belkin (2013–2014) ===
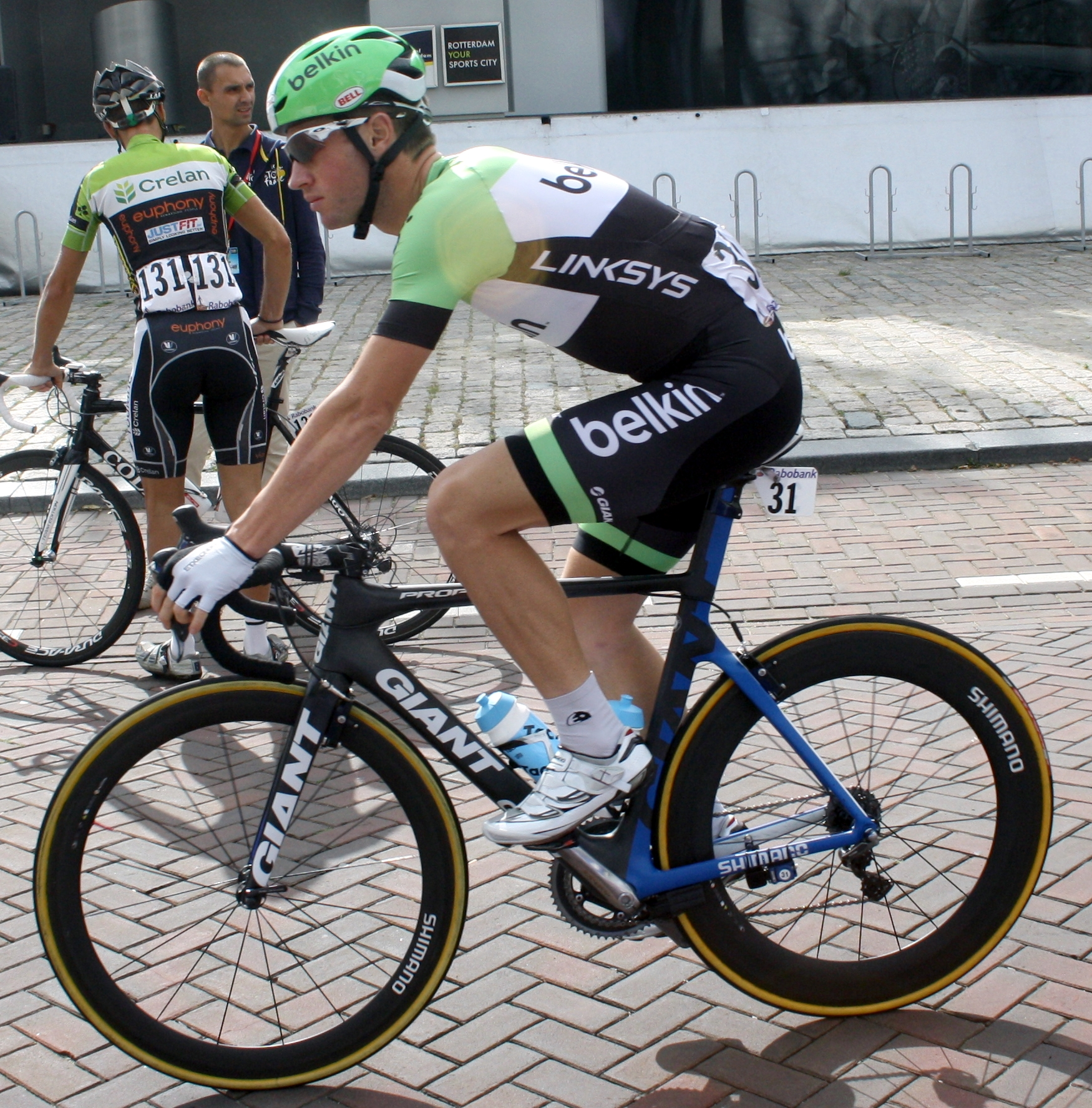
Mark Renshaw for Belkin in 2013

The team was able to continue, as Rabobank agreed to fund the team during 2013 until a new sponsor could be found. The deadline for finding new sponsorship was the end of the 2013 UCI World Tour. Racing under the name Blanco to refer to its formally unsponsored status, Tom-Jelte Slagter of the team won its first stage race, the 2013 Tour Down Under.

Belkin was announced as the team's new sponsor in June 2013 with a 2 1/2-year deal. In June 2014 they announced that they were exercising a clause in their contract to end their sponsorship of the team at the end of the 2014 season, forcing the team to find a new backer for the second time in 18 months. Subsequently, in July 2014 it was announced that the team had signed a formal declaration of intent with the Dutch lottery Lotto and marketing agency BrandLoyalty which would ensure their backing for two years, with an option for an additional two years. As part of the deal the cycling team would join forces with the BrandLoyalty speed skating team managed by Jac Orie and featuring Olympic and World Champions Sven Kramer and Stefan Groothuis.

=== LottoNL–Jumbo (2015–2018) ===
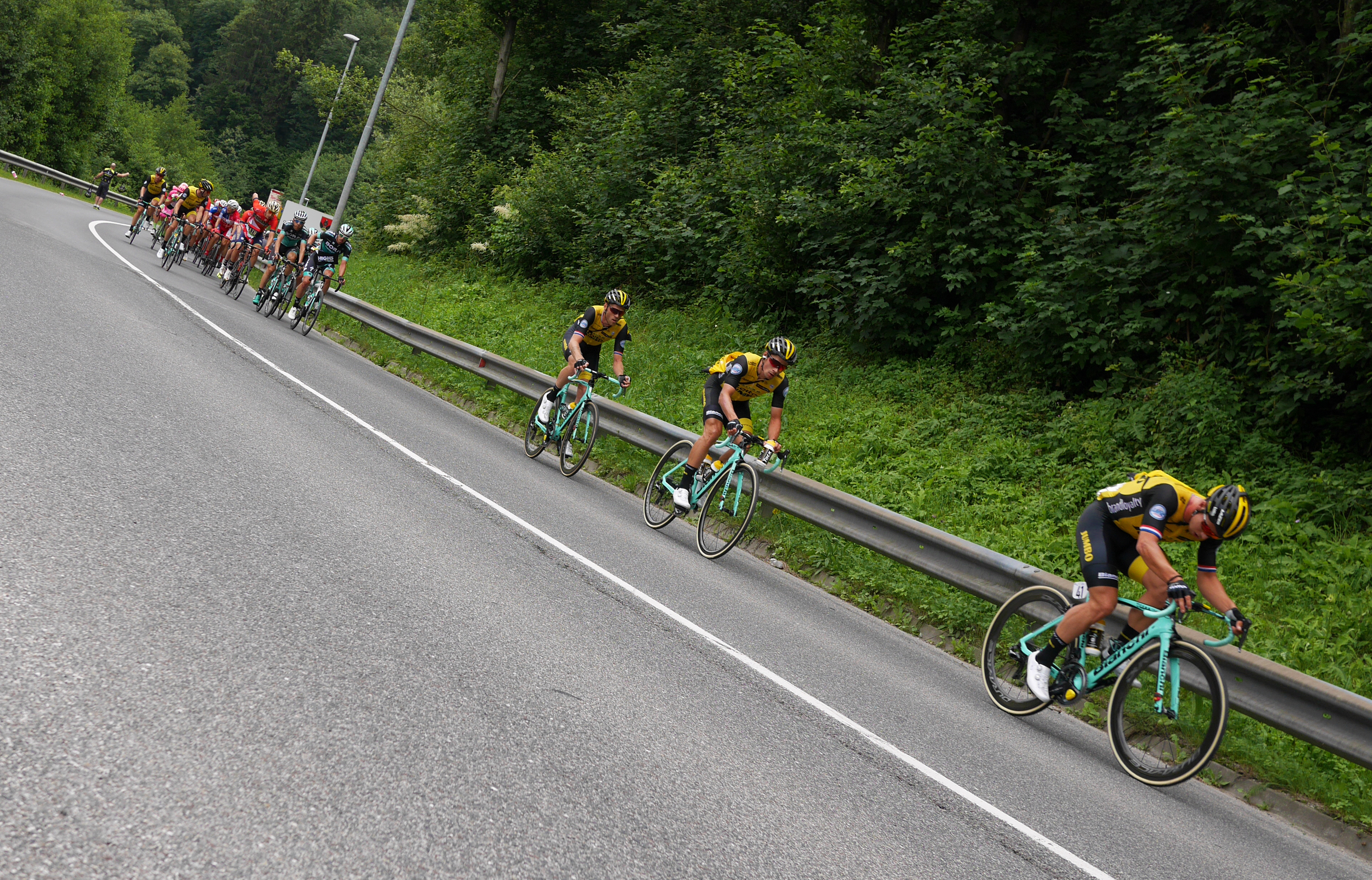
Team LottoNL-Jumbo leading the Peloton on the 3rd stage of Tour of Slovenia 2018, which was won by Primož Roglič (Team LottoNL-Jumbo)

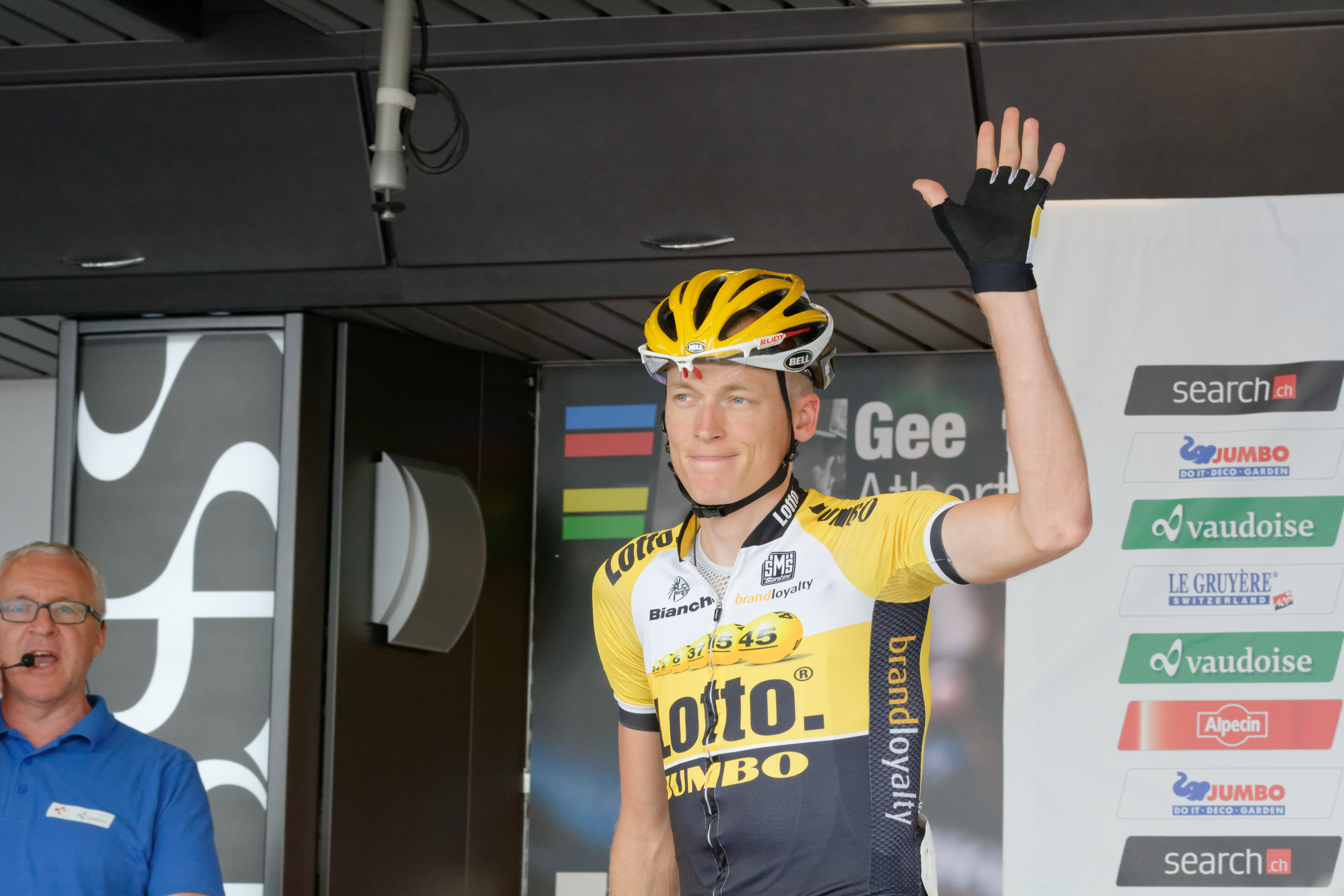
Robert Gesink for LottoNL at the 2015 Tour de Suisse

In June 2014 it was announced that Belkin would stop sponsoring the cycling team. On 20 July 2014, the team announced they had an agreement in place with the Brand Loyalty skating team. A day later, the team also released the news that the Dutch Lotto will also sponsor the team. On 29 September 2014, the contracts were signed between the two teams, meaning that the new name would be TEAMLottoNL, with the renaming taking effect from 1 January 2015.

On 23 October 2014, the team was unveiled in Utrecht as Team LottoNL–Jumbo showing their new black and yellow team kit. Lotto had previously been confirmed as the team's title sponsor, supermarket chain, Jumbo, was presented as the second sponsor of the WorldTour team. In September the team confirmed they would continue to ride on Bianchi bikes for the 2016 and 2017 seasons. On the first rest day of the 2016 Tour de France, the team announced LottoNL had agreed to extend their sponsorship of the team through to the end of the 2018 season.

=== Jumbo–Visma (2019–2023) ===
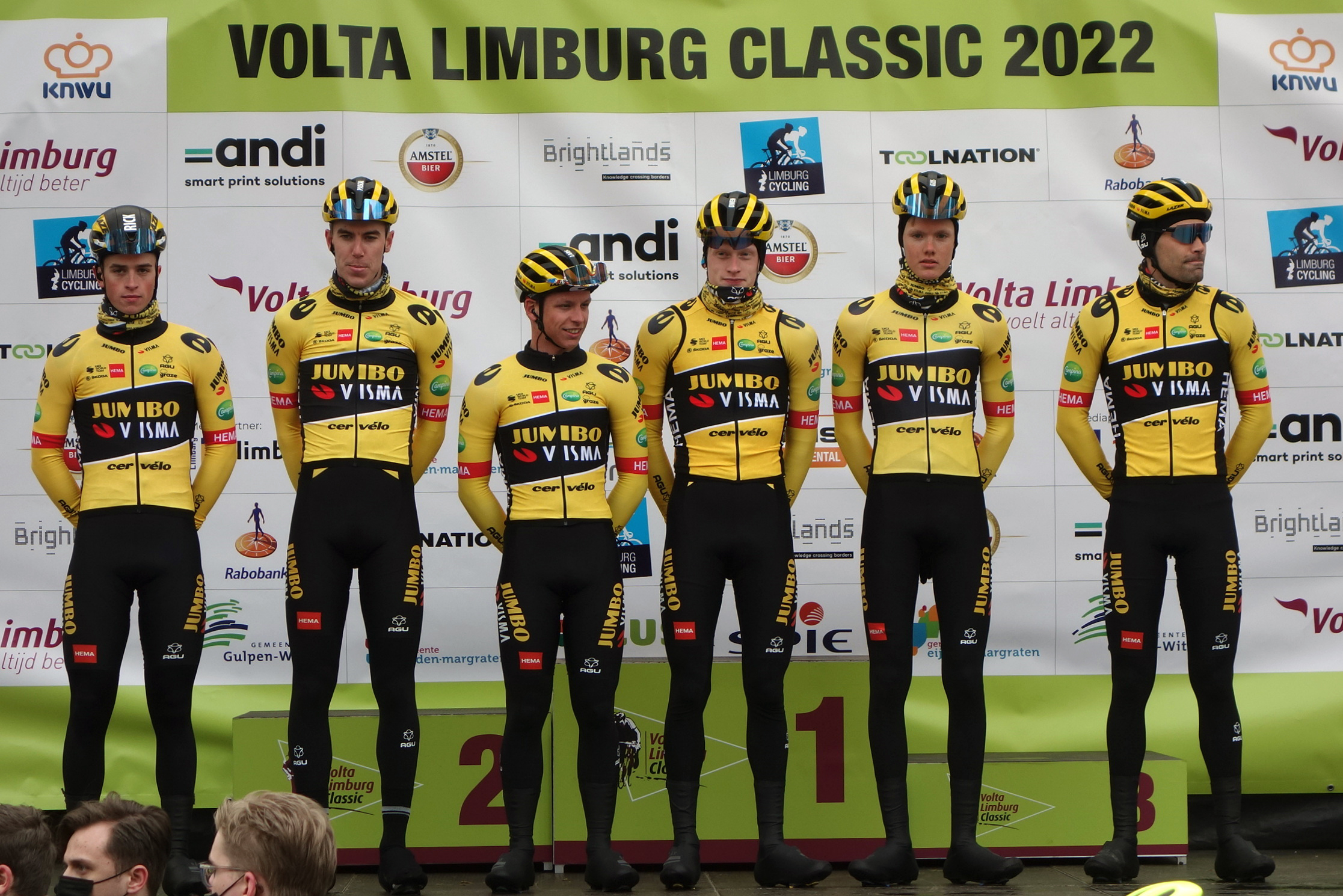
Team Jumbo-Visma 2022.

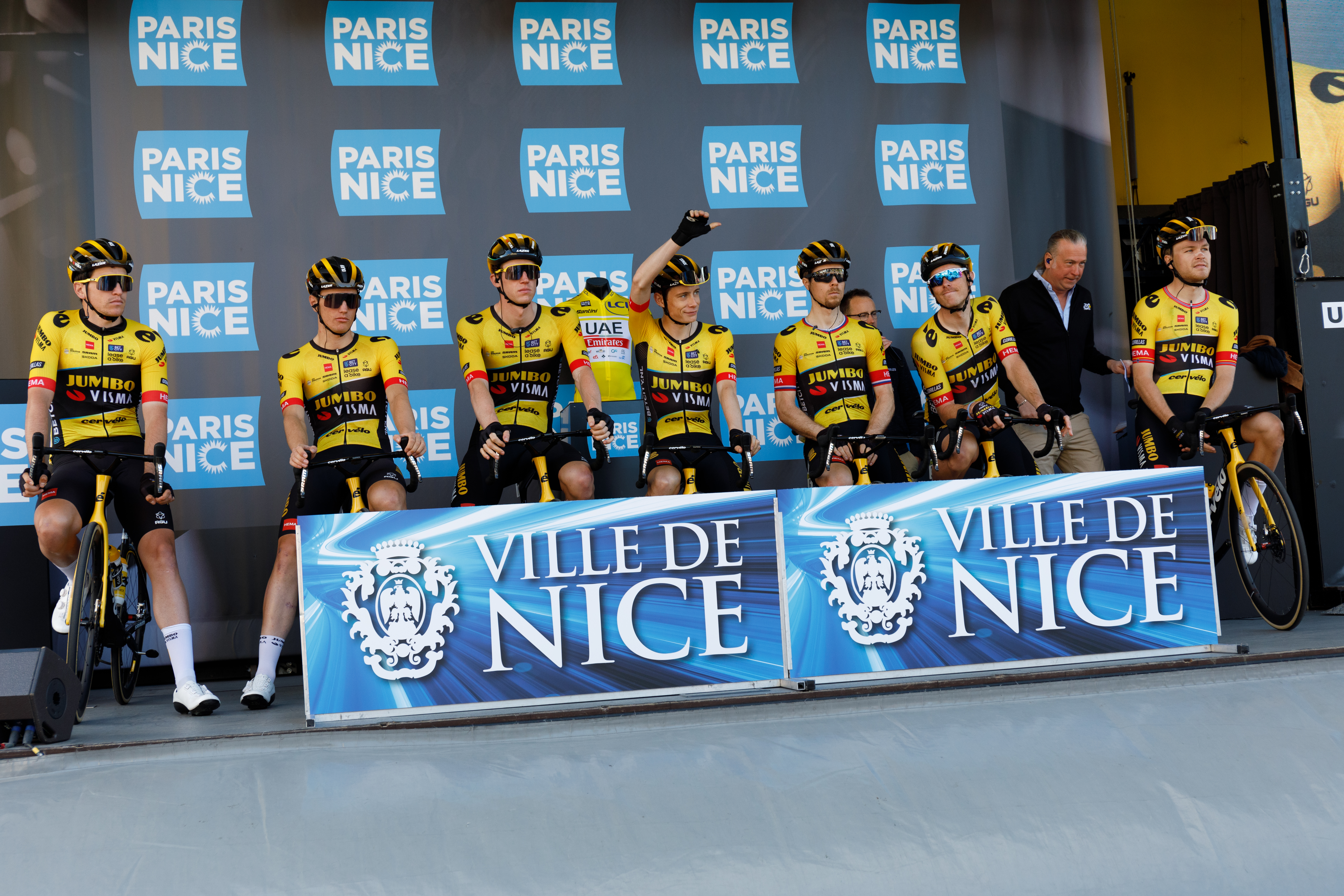
The team at the 2023 Paris–Nice.

After signing a new sponsorship deal with Visma, a Norwegian software company, the team was renamed to Team Jumbo–Visma on 1 January 2019. From the start of 2021, the team has a new bicycle sponsor, Cervélo, and the team is equipped with disc brakes instead of rim brakes.

=== Visma–Lease a Bike (2024–) ===
Jumbo, under new corporate leadership, planned to stop sponsoring professional sports by the end of 2024. It ended its sponsorship of the team at the end of 2023, and the team was renamed Visma–Lease A Bike, with Lease A Bike becoming a main sponsor after being a minor one in 2023.

== Road racing team ==
The road racing team has won several Classics such as the Tour of Flanders in 1997, Championship of Hamburg in 1998, the Amstel Gold Race in 1999 and 2001, Paris–Tours in 1999, 2004 and 2010, Clásica de San Sebastián in 2000 and Milan–San Remo in 2004, 2007 and 2010. Erik Dekker won the UCI World Cup in 2001 due to his Classic win and high placings in many of the classics.

=== Rabobank becoming a Grand Tour team ===
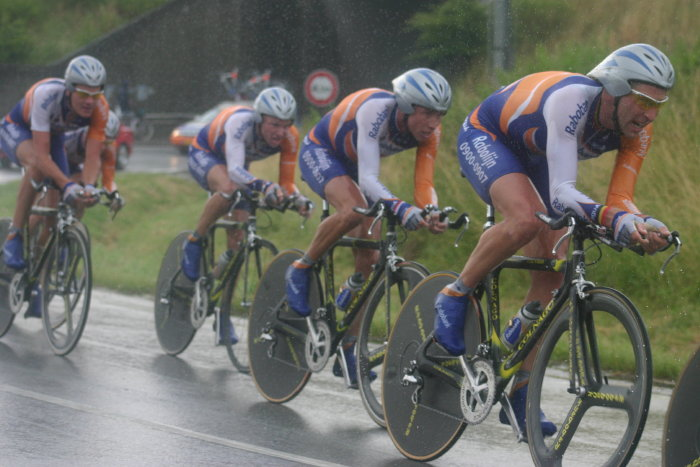
Rabobank team, 2004 Tour de France

The team signed American Levi Leipheimer in 2002 as a rider for the Tour de France. Leipheimer finished eighth in his first Tour but crashed out of the race on the first stage of the 2003 Tour de France. Leipheimer finished ninth overall the following year. The team became more of a Grand Tour team as could be seen by Michael Rasmussen's win in the Mountains Classification of the 2005 Tour de France. When Denis Menchov took the lead in the 2005 Vuelta a España, he was not expecting to be competing for the overall classification

The Rabobank team at that year's Vuelta were not seen as particularly strong or able to assist Menchov in the mountain stages. Menchov finished second to Roberto Heras which was the highest placing of a Rabobank team rider at a grand tour after Michael Boogerd's fifth place in the 1998 Tour de France. Heras was later disqualified for doping and Menchov was made the winner. In 1999 Menchov focused on the Tour de France where the team rode strongly with Menchov, Boogerd, and Rasmussen.

During the 2007 Tour de France, Rabobank fired Michael Rasmussen (2005 Tour de France, 2006 Tour de France K.O.M.) for code-violations while he was in the yellow jersey. The remaining riders of the Rabobank team were given the choice to start the 17th stage without Michael Rasmussen, or to withdraw. That evening they decided to withdraw, but the team changed its mind and announced the following morning that the riders would be starting the 17th stage. Although he started with the rest of the team, Denis Menchov (team leader on the road, who deferred to Rasmussen when the latter seemed to have a better chance at winning) abandoned the race in the middle of the stage.

The Rabobank team was invited for the 2008 Tour de France. Denis Menchov had decided to focus on the Tour de France. To do that, he did not defend his Vuelta a España-title, and rode the 2008 Giro d'Italia as preparation for the Tour de France. Menchov finished 4th place in the 2008 Tour de France, and Óscar Freire won the points classification. The team had to wait until 2009 for the first successes in the Giro d'Italia, when Denis Menchov won two stages; a mountain finish and a time trial. This second win earned him the pink leader jersey, which the team defended to the end of the race, earning Menchov, and Rabobank, their third Grand Tour GC win.

== Affiliated teams ==
- Women's road team: Team Visma–Lease a Bike (current); Rabo–Liv Women Cycling Team (former)
- Men's development team: Team Visma–Lease a Bike Development (current); Rabobank Development Team (former)

=== Cyclo-cross team ===
The Rabobank cyclo-cross team has dominated the sport in the past with Sven Nys and Richard Groenendaal winning the General Classification competitions such as the Superprestige, the World Cup and the Gazet van Antwerpen trophy over the last eight years. Groenendaal dominated the Dutch cyclo-cross championships for many years. Groenendaal left the team after the 2006–2007 season. He was at that time one of the few remaining Rabobank riders from the 1996 team. Lars Boom joined the team in 2002 as a junior cyclo-cross rider and has already achieved success in the Elite cyclo-cross championships as well as showing promise riding in the UCI Europe Tour with the Rabobank Continental team.

== Sponsorship ==
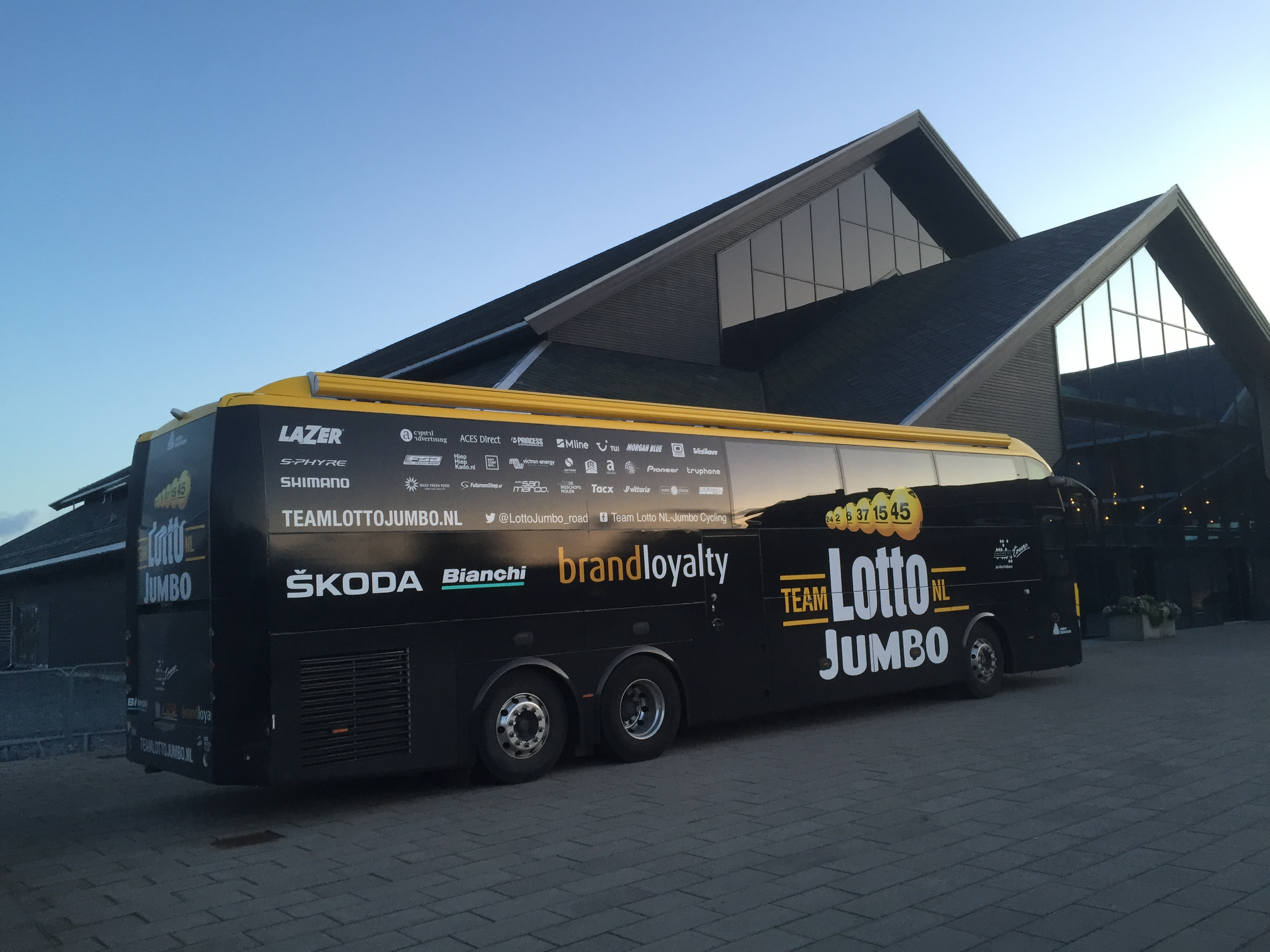
Team bus of LottoNL Jumbo during 2017 UCI Road World Championships in Bergen

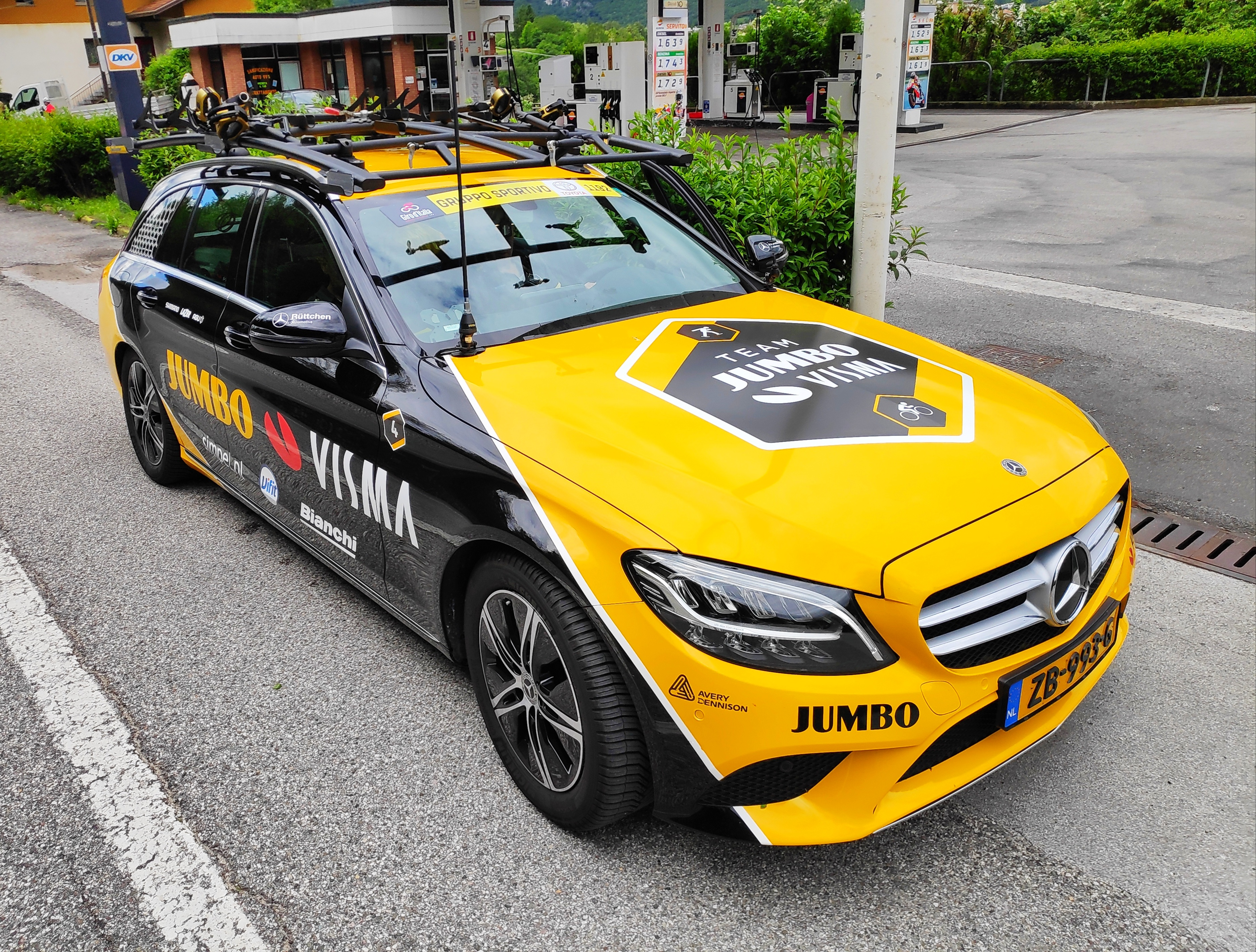
Mercedes – support car in 2019

Rabobank announced in October 2012 that it would end its sponsorship of professional cycling at the end of the year, with the team announcing its intention to continue as a ‘white label’ under a new foundation yet to be established. On 13 December 2012, the team announced it would participate in 2013 under the Blanco name and intended to either find a sponsor for 2014 or stop the team.

During the 2013 Giro d'Italia it emerged that the technology firm Belkin was a possible new sponsor. The deal was confirmed towards the end of May 2013, and the team's new identity was launched a week before the 2013 Tour de France.

The team formerly rode Colnago frames, but as of 1 January 2009 began a two-year contract riding Giant frames equipped with Shimano components. Starting in 2014, Bianchi supplies the team bicycles. The team began a two-year contract (2014–2016) wearing Santini SMS clothing.

The team struck a deal for consumer electronics company Belkin to sponsor the team from the 2013 Tour de France until the end of 2015. In 2015, Lotto, a Dutch lottery, agreed to sponsor the Team for four years. Between 2015 and 2023, the team was sponsored by a Dutch supermarket chain, Jumbo. The "NL" was added to the team's name to differentiate it from Lotto–Soudal, a ProTeam that is sponsored by the national lottery of Belgium.

In 2019, the team began a long-term contract with Norwegian business software provider Visma for at least five years, therefore becoming Team Jumbo–Visma. From 2021 team have had a bicycle partnership with Cervélo, ending their previous sponsorship with Bianchi, which lasted from 2014 to 2020. In 2024, the team became Visma–Lease a Bike, following sponsorship by German company Lease a Bike.

In February 2025, the team announced the return of former title partner Rabobank as ‘jersey sponsor’ for a minimum term of 3.5 years, commencing on 1st July 2025.

== Doping accusations ==
According to a 2012 investigation by de Volkskrant, doping was used by Rabobank riders since 1998 and condoned by the team, with team physicians actively monitoring the health of those riders. According to Stefan Matschiner, a key witness in the Humanplasma scandal, three (former) Rabobank riders were customers of the Swiss blood doping expert. Matschiner mentioned Michael Boogerd, the most successful Dutch Rabobank rider, and said one other team member was a customer. Theo de Rooij, Rabobank's manager since 2003 and responsible for pulling Michael Rasmussen from the 2007 Tour de France, did not deny doping was used by team riders but said that the use of doping was neither suggested nor paid for by the team.

A 2015 USADA report against Dr. Geert Leinders found that he and other team doctors supported and organized a blood doping program within the team for much of the 2000s, which included EPO, blood transfusions, HGH, and cortisones. Riders included in the report that doped during their Rabobank tenure include Denis Menchov, Michael Boogerd, Michael Rasmussen, and Levi Leipheimer.

== Team roster ==
As of 25 February 2026.

Rider	Date of birth
Edoardo Affini (ITA)	24 June 1996 (age 30)
Bruno Armirail (FRA)	11 April 1994 (age 32)
Louis Barré (FRA)	6 April 2000 (age 26)
Niklas Behrens (GER)	6 November 2003 (age 22)
Matthew Brennan (GBR)	6 August 2005 (age 21)
Victor Campenaerts (BEL)	28 October 1991 (age 34)
Owain Doull (GBR)	2 May 1993 (age 33)
Filippo Fiorelli (ITA)	19 November 1994 (age 31)
Tijmen Graat (NED)	10 January 2003 (age 23)
Per Strand Hagenes (NOR)	10 July 2003 (age 23)
Menno Huising (NED)	8 April 2004 (age 22)
Matteo Jorgenson (USA)	1 July 1999 (age 27)
Wilco Kelderman (NED)	25 March 1991 (age 35)
Timo Kielich (BEL)	5 August 1999 (age 27)

Rider	Date of birth
Steven Kruijswijk (NED)	7 June 1987 (age 39)
Sepp Kuss (USA)	13 September 1994 (age 31)
Christophe Laporte (FRA)	11 December 1992 (age 33)
Bart Lemmen (NED)	14 October 1995 (age 30)
Jørgen Nordhagen (NOR)	10 January 2005 (age 21)
Pietro Mattio (ITA)	27 June 2004 (age 22)
Davide Piganzoli (ITA)	8 July 2002 (age 24)
Tim Rex (BEL)	11 April 2004 (age 22)
Anton Schiffer (GER)	1 September 1999 (age 27)
Ben Tulett (GBR)	26 August 2001 (age 25)
Wout van Aert (BEL)	15 September 1994 (age 31)
Loe van Belle (NED)	24 January 2002 (age 24)
Jonas Vingegaard (DEN)	10 December 1996 (age 29)
Axel Zingle (FRA)	18 December 1998 (age 27)

== National, continental, world, and Olympic champions ==
1984
Netherlands Road Race, Jan Raas
1985
Netherlands Road Race, Jacques Hanegraaf
World Road Race, Joop Zoetemelk
1989
Netherlands Road Race, Frans Maassen
1990
Netherlands Road Race, Peter Winnen
1991
Netherlands Road Race, Steven Rooks
1996
World Cyclo-cross, Adri van der Poel
Netherlands Time Trial, Erik Dekker
1997
Netherlands Road Race, Michael Boogerd
Netherlands Time Trial, Erik Breukink
1998
U23 World Cyclo-cross, Sven Nys
Netherlands Road Race, Michael Boogerd
Netherlands Time Trial, Patrick Jonker
Switzerland Time Trial, Beat Zberg
Austria Time Trial, Peter Luttenberger
1999
Netherlands Road Race, Maarten den Bakker
2000
Belgium Cyclo-cross, Sven Nys
World Cyclo-cross, Richard Groenendaal
Netherlands Road Race, Léon van Bon
Switzerland Road Race, Markus Zberg
Netherlands Time Trial, Erik Dekker
2002
U23 World Cyclo-cross, Thijs Verhagen
Netherlands Time Trial, Erik Dekker
Belgium Time Trial, Marc Wauters
2003
Belgium Cyclo-cross, Sven Nys
Netherlands Time Trial, Maarten den Bakker
Belgium Time Trial, Marc Wauters
2004
Netherlands Road Race, Erik Dekker
Netherlands Time Trial, Thomas Dekker
Finland Time Trial, Jukka Vastaranta
World Road Race, Óscar Freire
2005
Belgium Cyclo-cross, Sven Nys
World Cyclo-cross, Sven Nys
Netherlands Time Trial, Thomas Dekker
Belgium Time Trial, Marc Wauters
2006
Belgium Cyclo-cross, Sven Nys
U23 World Cyclo-cross, Lars Boom
Netherlands Road Race, Michael Boogerd
2007
U23 World Time Trial, Lars Boom
Netherlands Road Race, Koos Moerenhout
2008
Belgium Cyclo-cross, Sven Nys
World Cyclo-cross, Lars Boom
Netherlands Road Race, Lars Boom
2009
Netherlands Cyclo-cross, Lars Boom
Netherlands Road Race, Koos Moerenhout
Netherlands Time Trial, Stef Clement
2010
Netherlands Cyclo-cross, Lars Boom
Netherlands Time Trial, Jos van Emden
2011
Netherlands Cyclo-cross, Lars Boom
Netherlands Time Trial, Stef Clement
Spain Time Trial, Luis León Sánchez
2012
Netherlands Cyclo-cross, Lars Boom
Spain Time Trial, Luis León Sánchez
2013
Norway Cyclo-cross, Lars Petter Nordhaug
2015
Netherlands Time Trial, Wilco Kelderman
2016
Slovenia Time Trial, Primož Roglič
Belgium Time Trial, Victor Campenaerts
Netherlands Road Race, Dylan Groenewegen
2017
European Time Trial, Victor Campenaerts
2019
Netherlands Time Trial, Jos van Emden
Belgium Time Trial, Wout van Aert
Germany Time Trial, Tony Martin
Norway Road Race, Amund Grøndahl Jansen
2020
Slovenia Road Race, Primož Roglič
Belgium Time Trial, Wout van Aert
2021
Belgium Cyclo-cross, Wout van Aert
New Zealand Road Race, George Bennett
Netherlands Time Trial, Tom Dumoulin
Norway Time Trial, Tobias Foss
Germany Time Trial, Tony Martin
Netherlands Road Race, Timo Roosen
Norway Road Race, Tobias Foss
Belgium Road Race, Wout van Aert
Olympic Time Trial, Primož Roglič
2022
Belgium Cyclo-cross, Wout van Aert
Australia Time Trial, Rohan Dennis
Norway Time Trial, Tobias Foss
Netherlands Road Race, Pascal Eenkhoorn
World Time Trial, Tobias Foss
2023
Netherlands Time Trial, Jos van Emden
Hungary Time Trial, Attila Valter
Belgium Time Trial, Wout van Aert
Netherlands Road Race, Dylan van Baarle
Hungary Road Race, Attila Valter
European Road Race, Christophe Laporte
