= 1998 Vuelta a España, Stage 12 to Stage 22 =

Cycling race stages

The 1998 Vuelta a España was the 53rd edition of the Vuelta a España, one of cycling's Grand Tours. The Vuelta began in Córdoba on 5 September, and Stage 12 occurred on 17 September with a stage from Benasque. The race finished in Madrid on 27 September.

== Stage 12 ==
17 September 1998 — Benasque to Jaca, 187 km (116 mi)

Stage 12 result

Rank	Rider	Team	Time
1	Gianni Bugno (ITA)	Mapei–Bricobi	4h 26' 03"
2	Santiago Blanco (ESP)	Vitalicio Seguros	+ 1' 48"
3	Roberto Sgambelluri (ITA)	Brescialat–Liquigas	+ 1' 50"
4	José Ramón Uriarte (ESP)	Festina–Lotus	+ 3' 22"
5	Alberto Leanizbarrutia (ESP)	ONCE	+ 5' 01"
6	Cristiano Frattini (ITA)	Brescialat–Liquigas	s.t.
7	Jon Odriozola (ESP)	Banesto	s.t.
8	Elio Aggiano (ITA)	Vitalicio Seguros	s.t.
9	Giancarlo Raimondi (ITA)	Brescialat–Liquigas	+ 7' 42"
10	Maurizio Frizzo (ITA)	Cantina Tollo–Alexia Alluminio	+ 7' 51"

General classification after Stage 12

Rank	Rider	Team	Time
1	Abraham Olano (ESP)	Banesto	52h 27' 30"
2	Laurent Jalabert (FRA)	ONCE	+ 35"
3	Fernando Escartín (ESP)	Kelme–Costa Blanca	+ 51"
4	José María Jiménez (ESP)	Banesto	+ 1' 17"
5	Daniel Clavero (ESP)	Vitalicio Seguros	+ 2' 01"
6	Álvaro González de Galdeano (ESP)	Euskaltel–Euskadi	+ 2' 09"
7	Alex Zülle (SUI)	Festina–Lotus	+ 2' 19"
8	Roberto Heras (ESP)	Kelme–Costa Blanca	+ 2' 24"
~~9~~	~~Lance Armstrong (USA)~~	~~U.S. Postal Service~~	~~+ 2' 44"~~
10	Oskar Camenzind (SUI)	Mapei–Bricobi	+ 2' 47"

== Stage 13 ==
18 September 1998 — Sabiñánigo to Sabiñánigo, 208.5 km (129.6 mi)

Stage 13 result

Rank	Rider	Team	Time
1	Andrei Zintchenko (RUS)	Vitalicio Seguros	5h 07' 12"
2	Ludo Dierckxsens (BEL)	Lotto–Mobistar	+ 2' 20"
3	Unai Etxebarria (VEN)	Euskaltel–Euskadi	s.t.
4	Marco Serpellini (ITA)	Brescialat–Liquigas	s.t.
5	Juan Carlos Domínguez (ESP)	Vitalicio Seguros	+ 2' 25"
6	Alexandre Moos (SUI)	Saeco–Cannondale	+ 3' 29"
7	Fabrizio Guidi (ITA)	Team Polti	+ 3' 39"
8	Bert Dietz (GER)	Team Telekom	s.t.
9	Peter Van Petegem (BEL)	TVM–Farm Frites	s.t.
10	Fabrice Gougot (FRA)	Casino–Ag2r	s.t.

General classification after Stage 13

Rank	Rider	Team	Time
1	Abraham Olano (ESP)	Banesto	57h 38' 21"
2	Laurent Jalabert (FRA)	ONCE	+ 35"
3	Fernando Escartín (ESP)	Kelme–Costa Blanca	+ 51"
4	José María Jiménez (ESP)	Banesto	+ 1' 17"
5	Daniel Clavero (ESP)	Vitalicio Seguros	+ 2' 01"
6	Álvaro González de Galdeano (ESP)	Euskaltel–Euskadi	+ 2' 09"
7	Alex Zülle (SUI)	Festina–Lotus	+ 2' 19"
8	Roberto Heras (ESP)	Kelme–Costa Blanca	+ 2' 24"
~~9~~	~~Lance Armstrong (USA)~~	~~U.S. Postal Service~~	~~+ 2' 44"~~
10	Oskar Camenzind (SUI)	Mapei–Bricobi	+ 2' 47"

== Stage 14 ==
19 September 1998 — Biescas to Zaragoza, 145.5 km (90.4 mi)

Stage 14 result

Rank	Rider	Team	Time
1	Marcel Wüst (GER)	Festina–Lotus	2h 50' 43"
2	Serguei Smetanine (RUS)	Vitalicio Seguros	s.t.
3	Fabrizio Guidi (ITA)	Team Polti	s.t.
4	Ángel Edo (ESP)	Kelme–Costa Blanca	s.t.
5	Peter Van Petegem (BEL)	TVM–Farm Frites	s.t.
6	Salvatore Commesso (ITA)	Saeco–Cannondale	s.t.
7	Kai Hundertmarck (GER)	Team Telekom	s.t.
8	Giancarlo Raimondi (ITA)	Brescialat–Liquigas	s.t.
9	Mario Aerts (BEL)	Lotto–Mobistar	s.t.
10	Sven Teutenberg (GER)	U.S. Postal Service	s.t.

General classification after Stage 14

Rank	Rider	Team	Time
1	Abraham Olano (ESP)	Banesto	60h 29' 04"
2	Laurent Jalabert (FRA)	ONCE	+ 35"
3	Fernando Escartín (ESP)	Kelme–Costa Blanca	+ 51"
4	José María Jiménez (ESP)	Banesto	+ 1' 17"
5	Daniel Clavero (ESP)	Vitalicio Seguros	+ 2' 01"
6	Álvaro González de Galdeano (ESP)	Euskaltel–Euskadi	+ 2' 09"
7	Alex Zülle (SUI)	Festina–Lotus	+ 2' 19"
8	Roberto Heras (ESP)	Kelme–Costa Blanca	+ 2' 24"
~~9~~	~~Lance Armstrong (USA)~~	~~U.S. Postal Service~~	~~+ 2' 44"~~
10	Oskar Camenzind (SUI)	Mapei–Bricobi	+ 2' 47"

== Stage 15 ==
20 September 1998 — Zaragoza to Soria, 178.7 km (111.0 mi)

Stage 15 result

Rank	Rider	Team	Time
1	Andrei Zintchenko (RUS)	Vitalicio Seguros	4h 06' 06"
2	David Plaza (ESP)	Cofidis	+ 3"
3	Fabrizio Guidi (ITA)	Team Polti	+ 56"
4	Markus Zberg (SUI)	Post Swiss Team	s.t.
5	Peter Van Petegem (BEL)	TVM–Farm Frites	s.t.
6	Serguei Smetanine (RUS)	Vitalicio Seguros	s.t.
7	Salvatore Commesso (ITA)	Saeco–Cannondale	s.t.
8	Laurent Brochard (FRA)	Festina–Lotus	s.t.
9	Martin Hvastija (SLO)	Cantina Tollo–Alexia Alluminio	s.t.
10	Oscar Camenzind (SUI)	Mapei–Bricobi	s.t.

General classification after Stage 15

Rank	Rider	Team	Time
1	Abraham Olano (ESP)	Banesto	64h 36' 06"
2	Laurent Jalabert (FRA)	ONCE	+ 35"
3	Fernando Escartín (ESP)	Kelme–Costa Blanca	+ 51"
4	José María Jiménez (ESP)	Banesto	+ 1' 17"
5	Daniel Clavero (ESP)	Vitalicio Seguros	+ 2' 01"
6	Álvaro González de Galdeano (ESP)	Euskaltel–Euskadi	+ 2' 09"
7	Alex Zülle (SUI)	Festina–Lotus	+ 2' 19"
8	Roberto Heras (ESP)	Kelme–Costa Blanca	+ 2' 24"
~~9~~	~~Lance Armstrong (USA)~~	~~U.S. Postal Service~~	~~+ 2' 44"~~
10	Oskar Camenzind (SUI)	Mapei–Bricobi	+ 2' 47"

== Stage 16 ==
21 September 1998 — Soria to Laguna Negra de Neila, 143.7 km (89.3 mi)

Stage 16 result

Rank	Rider	Team	Time
1	José María Jiménez (ESP)	Banesto	3h 28' 12"
2	Laurent Jalabert (FRA)	ONCE	+ 33"
3	Fernando Escartín (ESP)	Kelme–Costa Blanca	s.t.
4	Alex Zülle (SUI)	Festina–Lotus	+ 39"
5	Richard Virenque (FRA)	Festina–Lotus	s.t.
6	Manuel Beltrán (ESP)	Banesto	+ 46"
7	Abraham Olano (ESP)	Banesto	s.t.
8	José Castelblanco (COL)	Avianca-Telecom	+ 58"
9	Roberto Heras (ESP)	Kelme–Costa Blanca	s.t.
10	Daniel Clavero (ESP)	Vitalicio Seguros	+ 1' 02"

General classification after Stage 16

Rank	Rider	Team	Time
1	Abraham Olano (ESP)	Banesto	68h 05' 04"
2	Laurent Jalabert (FRA)	ONCE	+ 22"
3	José María Jiménez (ESP)	Banesto	+ 31"
4	Fernando Escartín (ESP)	Kelme–Costa Blanca	+ 38"
5	Alex Zülle (SUI)	Festina–Lotus	+ 2' 12"
6	Daniel Clavero (ESP)	Vitalicio Seguros	+ 2' 17"
7	Roberto Heras (ESP)	Kelme–Costa Blanca	+ 2' 36"
8	Manuel Beltrán (ESP)	Banesto	+ 2' 52"
9	Álvaro González de Galdeano (ESP)	Euskaltel–Euskadi	+ 3' 04"
~~10~~	~~Lance Armstrong (USA)~~	~~U.S. Postal Service~~	~~+ 3' 20"~~

== Stage 17 ==
22 September 1998 — Burgos to León, 188.5 km (117.1 mi)

Stage 17 result

Rank	Rider	Team	Time
1	Marcel Wüst (GER)	Festina–Lotus	4h 55' 33"
2	Ángel Edo (ESP)	Kelme–Costa Blanca	s.t.
3	Serguei Smetanine (RUS)	Vitalicio Seguros	s.t.
4	Sven Teutenberg (GER)	U.S. Postal Service	s.t.
5	Markus Zberg (SUI)	Post Swiss Team	s.t.
6	Peter Van Petegem (BEL)	TVM–Farm Frites	s.t.
7	Fabrizio Guidi (ITA)	Team Polti	s.t.
8	Nico Mattan (BEL)	Mapei–Bricobi	s.t.
9	Tristan Hoffman (NED)	TVM–Farm Frites	s.t.
10	Andrei Tchmil (UKR)	Lotto–Mobistar	s.t.

General classification after Stage 17

Rank	Rider	Team	Time
1	Abraham Olano (ESP)	Banesto	73h 00' 37"
2	Laurent Jalabert (FRA)	ONCE	+ 22"
3	José María Jiménez (ESP)	Banesto	+ 31"
4	Fernando Escartín (ESP)	Kelme–Costa Blanca	+ 38"
5	Alex Zülle (SUI)	Festina–Lotus	+ 2' 12"
6	Daniel Clavero (ESP)	Vitalicio Seguros	+ 2' 17"
7	Roberto Heras (ESP)	Kelme–Costa Blanca	+ 2' 36"
8	Manuel Beltrán (ESP)	Banesto	+ 2' 52"
9	Álvaro González de Galdeano (ESP)	Euskaltel–Euskadi	+ 3' 04"
~~10~~	~~Lance Armstrong (USA)~~	~~U.S. Postal Service~~	~~+ 3' 20"~~

== Stage 18 ==
23 September 1998 — León to Salamanca, 223 km (139 mi)

Stage 18 result

Rank	Rider	Team	Time
1	Fabrizio Guidi (ITA)	Team Polti	5h 59' 39"
2	Peter Van Petegem (BEL)	TVM–Farm Frites	s.t.
3	Markus Zberg (SUI)	Post Swiss Team	s.t.
4	Andrei Tchmil (UKR)	Lotto–Mobistar	s.t.
5	Ludo Dierckxsens (BEL)	Lotto–Mobistar	s.t.
6	Serguei Smetanine (RUS)	Vitalicio Seguros	s.t.
7	Ángel Edo (ESP)	Kelme–Costa Blanca	s.t.
8	Giancarlo Raimondi (ITA)	Brescialat–Liquigas	s.t.
9	Eleuterio Anguita (ESP)	Estepona en Marcha–Brepac	s.t.
10	Davide Bramati (ITA)	Mapei–Bricobi	s.t.

General classification after Stage 18

Rank	Rider	Team	Time
1	Abraham Olano (ESP)	Banesto	79h 00' 16"
2	Laurent Jalabert (FRA)	ONCE	+ 22"
3	José María Jiménez (ESP)	Banesto	+ 31"
4	Fernando Escartín (ESP)	Kelme–Costa Blanca	+ 38"
5	Alex Zülle (SUI)	Festina–Lotus	+ 2' 12"
6	Daniel Clavero (ESP)	Vitalicio Seguros	+ 2' 17"
7	Roberto Heras (ESP)	Kelme–Costa Blanca	+ 2' 36"
8	Álvaro González de Galdeano (ESP)	Euskaltel–Euskadi	+ 3' 04"
~~9~~	~~Lance Armstrong (USA)~~	~~U.S. Postal Service~~	~~+ 3' 20"~~
10	Oskar Camenzind (SUI)	Mapei–Bricobi	+ 4' 10"

== Stage 19 ==
24 September 1998 — Ávila to Segovia, 170.4 km (105.9 mi)

Stage 19 result

Rank	Rider	Team	Time
1	Roberto Heras (ESP)	Kelme–Costa Blanca	4h 13' 26"
2	Fernando Escartín (ESP)	Kelme–Costa Blanca	+ 30"
3	Álvaro González de Galdeano (ESP)	Euskaltel–Euskadi	s.t.
4	Laurent Jalabert (FRA)	ONCE	+ 31"
5	Gilberto Simoni (ITA)	Cantina Tollo–Alexia Alluminio	s.t.
6	Marco Serpellini (ITA)	Brescialat–Liquigas	s.t.
7	Abraham Olano (ESP)	Banesto	s.t.
8	Alex Zülle (SUI)	Festina–Lotus	s.t.
9	Daniel Clavero (ESP)	Vitalicio Seguros	s.t.
10	Andrei Zintchenko (RUS)	Vitalicio Seguros	s.t.

General classification after Stage 19

Rank	Rider	Team	Time
1	Abraham Olano (ESP)	Banesto	83h 14' 13"
2	Laurent Jalabert (FRA)	ONCE	+ 22"
3	José María Jiménez (ESP)	Banesto	+ 31"
4	Fernando Escartín (ESP)	Kelme–Costa Blanca	+ 37"
5	Roberto Heras (ESP)	Kelme–Costa Blanca	+ 2' 05"
6	Alex Zülle (SUI)	Festina–Lotus	+ 2' 12"
7	Daniel Clavero (ESP)	Vitalicio Seguros	+ 2' 17"
8	Álvaro González de Galdeano (ESP)	Euskaltel–Euskadi	+ 3' 03"
~~9~~	~~Lance Armstrong (USA)~~	~~U.S. Postal Service~~	~~+ 3' 20"~~
10	José Castelblanco (COL)	Avianca–Telecom	+ 4' 24"

== Stage 20 ==
25 September 1998 — Segovia to Alto de Navacerrada, 206 km (128 mi)

Stage 20 result

Rank	Rider	Team	Time
1	Andrei Zintchenko (RUS)	Vitalicio Seguros	5h 33' 33"
2	Roberto Heras (ESP)	Kelme–Costa Blanca	s.t.
3	José María Jiménez (ESP)	Banesto	s.t.
4	Fernando Escartín (ESP)	Kelme–Costa Blanca	s.t.
~~5~~	~~Lance Armstrong (USA)~~	~~U.S. Postal Service~~	~~s.t.~~
6	Marco Serpellini (ITA)	Brescialat–Liquigas	+ 1' 07"
7	Abraham Olano (ESP)	Banesto	+ 1' 09"
8	Marcos-Antonio Serrano (ESP)	Kelme–Costa Blanca	+ 1' 18"
9	Laurent Jalabert (FRA)	ONCE	+ 1' 49"
10	Álvaro González de Galdeano (ESP)	Euskaltel–Euskadi	+ 2' 01"

General classification after Stage 20

Rank	Rider	Team	Time
1	José María Jiménez (ESP)	Banesto	88h 48' 17"
2	Fernando Escartín (ESP)	Kelme–Costa Blanca	+ 6"
3	Abraham Olano (ESP)	Banesto	+ 38"
4	Roberto Heras (ESP)	Kelme–Costa Blanca	+ 1' 34"
5	Laurent Jalabert (FRA)	ONCE	+ 1' 40"
~~6~~	~~Lance Armstrong (USA)~~	~~U.S. Postal Service~~	~~+ 2' 49"~~
7	Álvaro González de Galdeano (ESP)	Euskaltel–Euskadi	+ 4' 33"
8	Alex Zülle (SUI)	Festina–Lotus	+ 6' 44"
9	Marco Serpellini (ITA)	Brescialat–Liquigas	+ 7' 28"
10	Marcos-Antonio Serrano (ESP)	Kelme–Costa Blanca	+ 7' 41"

== Stage 21 ==
26 September 1998 — Fuenlabrada to Fuenlabrada, 39 km (24 mi) (ITT)

Stage 21 result

Rank	Rider	Team	Time
1	Alex Zülle (SUI)	Festina–Lotus	46' 36"
2	Abraham Olano (ESP)	Banesto	+ 1"
~~3~~	~~Lance Armstrong (USA)~~	~~U.S. Postal Service~~	~~+ 8"~~
4	Richard Virenque (FRA)	Festina–Lotus	+ 1' 01"
5	José Luis Rubiera (ESP)	Kelme–Costa Blanca	+ 1' 11"
6	José Vicente García (ESP)	Banesto	+ 1' 12"
7	Melcior Mauri (ESP)	ONCE	+ 1' 21"
8	Peter Meinert Nielsen (DEN)	U.S. Postal Service	+ 1' 27"
9	Nico Mattan (BEL)	Mapei–Bricobi	+ 1' 32"
10	Marc Wauters (BEL)	Rabobank	s.t.

General classification after Stage 21

Rank	Rider	Team	Time
1	Abraham Olano (ESP)	Banesto	89h 35' 32"
2	Fernando Escartín (ESP)	Kelme–Costa Blanca	+ 1' 23"
3	José María Jiménez (ESP)	Banesto	+ 2' 12"
~~4~~	~~Lance Armstrong (USA)~~	~~U.S. Postal Service~~	~~+ 2' 18"~~
5	Laurent Jalabert (FRA)	ONCE	+ 2' 37"
6	Roberto Heras (ESP)	Kelme–Costa Blanca	+ 2' 58"
7	Álvaro González de Galdeano (ESP)	Euskaltel–Euskadi	+ 5' 51"
8	Alex Zülle (SUI)	Festina–Lotus	+ 6' 05"
9	Marco Serpellini (ITA)	Brescialat–Liquigas	+ 8' 58"
10	Marcos-Antonio Serrano (ESP)	Kelme–Costa Blanca	+ 10' 17"

== Stage 22 ==
27 September 1998 — Madrid to Madrid, 163 km (101 mi)

Stage 22 result

Rank	Rider	Team	Time
1	Markus Zberg (SUI)	Post Swiss Team	4h 08' 36"
2	Max van Heeswijk (NED)	Rabobank	s.t.
3	Giancarlo Raimondi (ITA)	Brescialat–Liquigas	s.t.
4	Salvatore Commesso (ITA)	Saeco–Cannondale	s.t.
5	Marcel Wüst (GER)	Festina–Lotus	s.t.
6	Guido Trenti (USA)	Cantina Tollo–Alexia Alluminio	s.t.
7	Richard Chassot (SUI)	Post Swiss Team	s.t.
8	Chris Peers (BEL)	Lotto–Mobistar	s.t.
9	Pascal Chanteur (FRA)	Casino–Ag2r	s.t.
10	Laurent Jalabert (FRA)	ONCE	s.t.

General classification after Stage 22

Rank	Rider	Team	Time
1	Abraham Olano (ESP)	Banesto	93h 44' 08"
2	Fernando Escartín (ESP)	Kelme–Costa Blanca	+ 1' 23"
3	José María Jiménez (ESP)	Banesto	+ 2' 12"
~~4~~	~~Lance Armstrong (USA)~~	~~U.S. Postal Service~~	~~+ 2' 18"~~
5	Laurent Jalabert (FRA)	ONCE	+ 2' 37"
6	Roberto Heras (ESP)	Kelme–Costa Blanca	+ 2' 58"
7	Álvaro González de Galdeano (ESP)	Euskaltel–Euskadi	+ 5' 51"
8	Alex Zülle (SUI)	Festina–Lotus	+ 6' 05"
9	Marco Serpellini (ITA)	Brescialat–Liquigas	+ 8' 58"
10	Marcos-Antonio Serrano (ESP)	Kelme–Costa Blanca	+ 10' 17"
