= List of teams and cyclists in the 1998 Giro d'Italia =

The 1998 Giro d'Italia was the 81st edition of the Giro d'Italia, one of cycling's Grand Tours. The field consisted of 162 riders, and 94 riders finished the race.

== By rider ==
Legend
No.	Starting number worn by the rider during the Giro
Pos.	Position in the general classification
DNF	Denotes a rider who did not finish

No.	Name	Nationality	Team	Pos.	Ref
1	Ivan Gotti	Italy	Saeco–Cannondale	DNF	
2	Mario Cipollini	Italy	Saeco–Cannondale	DNF	
3	Gian Matteo Fagnini	Italy	Saeco–Cannondale	77	
4	Giuseppe Calcaterra	Italy	Saeco–Cannondale	93	
5	Dario Frigo	Italy	Saeco–Cannondale	42	
6	Pavel Padrnos	Czech Republic	Saeco–Cannondale	36	
7	Leonardo Piepoli	Italy	Saeco–Cannondale	16	
8	Paolo Savoldelli	Italy	Saeco–Cannondale	9	
9	Mario Scirea	Italy	Saeco–Cannondale	61	
11	Glenn Magnusson	Sweden	Amore & Vita–ForzArcore	DNF	
12	Dario Andriotto	Italy	Amore & Vita–ForzArcore	DNF	
13	Sandro Giacomelli	Italy	Amore & Vita–ForzArcore	DNF	
14	Andrea Patuelli	Italy	Amore & Vita–ForzArcore	81	
15	Simone Zucchi	Italy	Amore & Vita–ForzArcore	DNF	
16	Matthew White	Australia	Amore & Vita–ForzArcore	DNF	
17	Maurizio De Pasquale	Italy	Amore & Vita–ForzArcore	74	
18	Simone Leporatti	Italy	Amore & Vita–ForzArcore	DNF	
19	Federico Profeti	Italy	Amore & Vita–ForzArcore	63	
21	Michele Bartoli	Italy	Asics–CGA	DNF	
22	Paolo Bettini	Italy	Asics–CGA	7	
23	Andrea Noè	Italy	Asics–CGA	15	
24	Alexandr Shefer	Kazakhstan	Asics–CGA	44	
25	Luca Scinto	Italy	Asics–CGA	DNF	
26	Federico Colonna	Italy	Asics–CGA	DNF	
27	Michele Coppolillo	Italy	Asics–CGA	75	
28	David Tani	Italy	Asics–CGA	89	
29	Carlo Marino Bianchi	Italy	Asics–CGA	DNF	
31	Stefano Cattai	Italy	Ballan	67	
32	Gabriele Colombo	Italy	Ballan	52	
33	Carlo Finco	Italy	Ballan	65	
34	Alexander Gontchenkov	Russia	Ballan	DNF	
35	Endrio Leoni	Italy	Ballan	DNF	
36	Nicola Loda	Italy	Ballan	46	
37	Angelo Canzonieri	Italy	Ballan	78	
38	Amilcare Tronca	Italy	Ballan	33	
39	Piotr Ugrumov	Russia	Ballan	40	
41	Enrico Zaina	Italy	Brescialat–Liquigas	DNF	
42	Roberto Sgambelluri	Italy	Brescialat–Liquigas	19	
43	Mariano Piccoli	Italy	Brescialat–Liquigas	35	
44	Marco Serpellini	Italy	Brescialat–Liquigas	70	
45	Marco Della Vedova	Italy	Brescialat–Liquigas	83	
46	Oscar Mason	Italy	Brescialat–Liquigas	DNF	
47	Ellis Rastelli	Italy	Brescialat–Liquigas	DNF	
48	Marzio Bruseghin	Italy	Brescialat–Liquigas	80	
49	Giancarlo Raimondi	Italy	Brescialat–Liquigas	DNF	
51	Alessandro Baronti	Italy	Cantina Tollo–Alexia Alluminio	DNF	
52	Marco Antonio Di Renzo	Italy	Cantina Tollo–Alexia Alluminio	94	
53	Gilberto Simoni	Italy	Cantina Tollo–Alexia Alluminio	58	
54	Serhiy Honchar	Ukraine	Cantina Tollo–Alexia Alluminio	10	
55	Martin Hvastija	Slovenia	Cantina Tollo–Alexia Alluminio	88	
56	Marco Magnani	Italy	Cantina Tollo–Alexia Alluminio	31	
57	Luca Mazzanti	Italy	Cantina Tollo–Alexia Alluminio	73	
58	Germano Pierdomenico	Italy	Cantina Tollo–Alexia Alluminio	DNF	
59	Massimo Strazzer	Italy	Cantina Tollo–Alexia Alluminio	91	
61	Pascal Richard	Switzerland	Casino–Ag2r	DNF	
62	Rolf Järmann	Switzerland	Casino–Ag2r	85	
63	Marco Saligari	Italy	Casino–Ag2r	92	
64	Marc Streel	Belgium	Casino–Ag2r	DNF	
65	Artūras Kasputis	Lithuania	Casino–Ag2r	DNF	
66	Frédéric Bessy	France	Casino–Ag2r	79	
67	Fabrice Gougot	France	Casino–Ag2r	26	
68	David Lefèvre	France	Casino–Ag2r	84	
69	Vincent Cali	France	Casino–Ag2r	DNF	
71	Wladimir Belli	Italy	Festina–Lotus	25	
72	Andrey Kivilev	Kazakhstan	Festina–Lotus	53	
73	Bruno Boscardin	Switzerland	Festina–Lotus	DNF	
74	Félix García Casas	Spain	Festina–Lotus	37	
75	Fabian Jeker	Switzerland	Festina–Lotus	49	
76	Armin Meier	Switzerland	Festina–Lotus	48	
77	Marcel Wüst	Germany	Festina–Lotus	DNF	
78	Alex Zülle	Switzerland	Festina–Lotus	14	
79	José Ramón Uriarte	Spain	Festina–Lotus	DNF	
81	José Luis Rubiera	Spain	Kelme–Costa Blanca	13	
82	José Jaime González	Colombia	Kelme–Costa Blanca	12	
83	Santiago Botero	Colombia	Kelme–Costa Blanca	54	
84	Arsenio González	Spain	Kelme–Costa Blanca	55	
85	Ángel Edo	Spain	Kelme–Costa Blanca	DNF	
86	Javier Otxoa	Spain	Kelme–Costa Blanca	DNF	
87	Miguel Ángel Martín Perdiguero	Spain	Kelme–Costa Blanca	DNF	
88	José Enrique Gutiérrez	Spain	Kelme–Costa Blanca	DNF	
89	Óscar Sevilla	Spain	Kelme–Costa Blanca	DNF	
91	Pavel Tonkov	Russia	Mapei–Bricobi	2	
92	Gianni Bugno	Italy	Mapei–Bricobi	50	
93	Davide Bramati	Italy	Mapei–Bricobi	68	
94	Oscar Camenzind	Switzerland	Mapei–Bricobi	4	
95	Massimo Codol	Italy	Mapei–Bricobi	32	
96	Gianni Faresin	Italy	Mapei–Bricobi	6	
97	Paolo Lanfranchi	Italy	Mapei–Bricobi	18	
98	Gabriele Missaglia	Italy	Mapei–Bricobi	41	
99	Zbigniew Spruch	Poland	Mapei–Bricobi	72	
101	Marco Pantani	Italy	Mercatone Uno–Bianchi	1	
102	Stefano Garzelli	Italy	Mercatone Uno–Bianchi	21	
103	Roberto Conti	Italy	Mercatone Uno–Bianchi	29	
104	Dimitri Konyshev	Russia	Mercatone Uno–Bianchi	51	
105	Massimo Podenzana	Italy	Mercatone Uno–Bianchi	11	
106	Fabiano Fontanelli	Italy	Mercatone Uno–Bianchi	DNF	
107	Riccardo Forconi	Italy	Mercatone Uno–Bianchi	DNF	
108	Marco Velo	Italy	Mercatone Uno–Bianchi	20	
109	Marcello Siboni	Italy	Mercatone Uno–Bianchi	43	
111	Nicola Minali	Italy	Riso Scotti–MG Maglificio	DNF	
112	Fabio Baldato	Italy	Riso Scotti–MG Maglificio	DNF	
113	Nicola Miceli	Italy	Riso Scotti–MG Maglificio	DNF	
114	Bruno Cenghialta	Italy	Riso Scotti–MG Maglificio	57	
115	Andrea Brognara	Italy	Riso Scotti–MG Maglificio	86	
116	Ermanno Brignoli	Italy	Riso Scotti–MG Maglificio	69	
117	Vladislav Bobrik	Russia	Riso Scotti–MG Maglificio	23	
118	Stefano Casagranda	Italy	Riso Scotti–MG Maglificio	DNF	
119	Giuseppe Palumbo	Italy	Riso Scotti–MG Maglificio	DNF	
121	Francesco Arazzi	Italy	Ros Mary–Amica Chips	DNF	
122	Claudio Chiappucci	Italy	Ros Mary–Amica Chips	60	
123	Daniele De Paoli	Italy	Ros Mary–Amica Chips	8	
124	Stefano Finesso	Italy	Ros Mary–Amica Chips	82	
125	Luca Gelfi	Italy	Ros Mary–Amica Chips	76	
126	Maurizio Molinari	Italy	Ros Mary–Amica Chips	DNF	
127	Felice Puttini	Switzerland	Ros Mary–Amica Chips	39	
128	Antonio Tauler	Spain	Ros Mary–Amica Chips	DNF	
129	José Manuel Uría	Spain	Ros Mary–Amica Chips	DNF	
131	Biagio Conte	Italy	Scrigno–Gaerne	DNF	
132	Davide Casarotto	Italy	Scrigno–Gaerne	DNF	
133	Mirko Rossato	Italy	Scrigno–Gaerne	DNF	
134	Alessandro Petacchi	Italy	Scrigno–Gaerne	DNF	
135	Filippo Casagrande	Italy	Scrigno–Gaerne	71	
136	Andrea Vatteroni	Italy	Scrigno–Gaerne	87	
137	Niklas Axelsson	Sweden	Scrigno–Gaerne	38	
138	Vladimir Duma	Ukraine	Scrigno–Gaerne	90	
139	Francesco Secchiari	Italy	Scrigno–Gaerne	24	
141	Giuseppe Guerini	Italy	Team Polti	3	
142	Enrico Cassani	Italy	Team Polti	DNF	
143	Gianluca Valoti	Italy	Team Polti	DNF	
144	Mirco Gualdi	Italy	Team Polti	66	
145	Fabrizio Guidi	Italy	Team Polti	DNF	
146	Luc Leblanc	France	Team Polti	34	
147	Silvio Martinello	Italy	Team Polti	DNF	
148	Davide Rebellin	Italy	Team Polti	30	
149	Cristian Salvato	Italy	Team Polti	DNF	
151	Michael Andersson	Sweden	TVM–Farm Frites	DNF	
152	Jeroen Blijlevens	Netherlands	TVM–Farm Frites	DNF	
153	Geert Van Bondt	Belgium	TVM–Farm Frites	DNF	
154	Tristan Hoffman	Netherlands	TVM–Farm Frites	DNF	
155	Michel Lafis	Sweden	TVM–Farm Frites	DNF	
156	Nicolaj Bo Larsen	Denmark	TVM–Farm Frites	DNF	
157	Claus Michael Møller	Denmark	TVM–Farm Frites	17	
158	Serguei Outschakov	Ukraine	TVM–Farm Frites	DNF	
159	Laurent Roux	France	TVM–Farm Frites	28	
161	Stefano Faustini	Italy	Vini Caldirola	22	
162	Giorgio Furlan	Italy	Vini Caldirola	62	
163	Massimo Apollonio	Italy	Vini Caldirola	DNF	
164	Leonardo Calzavara	Italy	Vini Caldirola	47	
165	Mauro Radaelli	Italy	Vini Caldirola	DNF	
166	Gianluca Sironi	Italy	Vini Caldirola	DNF	
167	Denis Zanette	Italy	Vini Caldirola	DNF	
168	Mauro Zanetti	Italy	Vini Caldirola	56	
169	Marco Zanotti	Italy	Vini Caldirola	DNF	
171	Daniel Clavero	Spain	Vitalicio Seguros	5	
172	Juan Carlos Domínguez	Spain	Vitalicio Seguros	45	
173	Vicente Aparicio	Spain	Vitalicio Seguros	59	
174	Elio Aggiano	Italy	Vitalicio Seguros	DNF	
175	Andrea Ferrigato	Italy	Vitalicio Seguros	64	
176	Pedro Horrillo	Spain	Vitalicio Seguros	DNF	
177	Hernán Buenahora	Colombia	Vitalicio Seguros	27	
178	Andrei Zintchenko	Russia	Vitalicio Seguros	DNF	
179	Serguei Smetanine	Russia	Vitalicio Seguros	DNF	
