= List of teams and cyclists in the 1999 Giro d'Italia =

The 1999 Giro d'Italia was the 82nd edition of the Giro d'Italia, one of cycling's Grand Tours. The field consisted of 162 riders, and 116 riders finished the race.

== By rider ==
Legend
No.	Starting number worn by the rider during the Giro
Pos.	Position in the general classification
DNF	Denotes a rider who did not finish

No.	Name	Nationality	Team	Pos.	Ref
1	Marco Pantani	Italy	Mercatone Uno–Bianchi	DNF	
2	Enrico Zaina	Italy	Mercatone Uno–Bianchi	DNF	
3	Stefano Garzelli	Italy	Mercatone Uno–Bianchi	DNF	
4	Riccardo Forconi	Italy	Mercatone Uno–Bianchi	DNF	
5	Simone Borgheresi	Italy	Mercatone Uno–Bianchi	DNF	
6	Ermanno Brignoli	Italy	Mercatone Uno–Bianchi	DNF	
7	Fabiano Fontanelli	Italy	Mercatone Uno–Bianchi	DNF	
8	Marco Velo	Italy	Mercatone Uno–Bianchi	DNF	
9	Massimo Podenzana	Italy	Mercatone Uno–Bianchi	DNF	
11	Evgeni Berzin	Russia	Amica Chips–Costa de Almería	52	
12	Daniele De Paoli	Italy	Amica Chips–Costa de Almería	8	
13	Viatcheslav Ekimov	Russia	Amica Chips–Costa de Almería	58	
14	Felice Puttini	Switzerland	Amica Chips–Costa de Almería	24	
15	Amilcare Tronca	Italy	Amica Chips–Costa de Almería	32	
16	Pietro Caucchioli	Italy	Amica Chips–Costa de Almería	46	
17	Simone Campagnari	Italy	Amica Chips–Costa de Almería	DNF	
18	Marco Gili	Italy	Amica Chips–Costa de Almería	88	
19	Francesco Arazzi	Italy	Amica Chips–Costa de Almería	112	
21	Fabio Baldato	Italy	Ballan–Alessio	103	
22	Filippo Baldo	Italy	Ballan–Alessio	DNF	
23	Andrea Ferrigato	Italy	Ballan–Alessio	DNF	
24	Alexander Gontchenkov	Russia	Ballan–Alessio	DNF	
25	Nicola Loda	Italy	Ballan–Alessio	DNF	
26	Martin Hvastija	Slovenia	Ballan–Alessio	75	
27	Gilberto Simoni	Italy	Ballan–Alessio	3	
28	Matteo Tosatto	Italy	Ballan–Alessio	43	
29	Piotr Ugrumov	Russia	Ballan–Alessio	DNF	
31	José Luis Arrieta	Spain	Banesto	34	
32	Marzio Bruseghin	Italy	Banesto	66	
33	José María Jiménez	Spain	Banesto	33	
34	Alex Zülle	Switzerland	Banesto	DNF	
35	David Navas Chica	Spain	Banesto	84	
36	Aitor Osa	Spain	Banesto	DNF	
37	Leonardo Piepoli	Italy	Banesto	DNF	
38	Miguel Ángel Peña	Spain	Banesto	41	
39	Orlando Rodrigues	Portugal	Banesto	51	
41	Nicola Minali	Italy	Cantina Tollo–Alexia Alluminio	113	
42	Andrea Brognara	Italy	Cantina Tollo–Alexia Alluminio	110	
43	Guido Trenti	Italy	Cantina Tollo–Alexia Alluminio	106	
44	Roberto Sgambelluri	Italy	Cantina Tollo–Alexia Alluminio	10	
45	Massimiliano Gentili	Italy	Cantina Tollo–Alexia Alluminio	50	
46	Cristian Gasperoni	Italy	Cantina Tollo–Alexia Alluminio	35	
47	Marco Magnani	Italy	Cantina Tollo–Alexia Alluminio	57	
48	Danilo Di Luca	Italy	Cantina Tollo–Alexia Alluminio	DNF	
49	Bo Hamburger	Denmark	Cantina Tollo–Alexia Alluminio	59	
51	José Luis Rubiera	Spain	Kelme–Costa Blanca	DNF	
52	Roberto Heras	Spain	Kelme–Costa Blanca	5	
53	Ángel Edo	Spain	Kelme–Costa Blanca	79	
54	José Jaime González	Colombia	Kelme–Costa Blanca	23	
55	Francisco Cabello	Spain	Kelme–Costa Blanca	68	
56	Óscar Sevilla	Spain	Kelme–Costa Blanca	13	
57	Eduardo Hernández Bailo	Spain	Kelme–Costa Blanca	94	
58	Javier Otxoa	Spain	Kelme–Costa Blanca	DNF	
59	José Manuel Uría	Spain	Kelme–Costa Blanca	DNF	
61	Oscar Camenzind	Switzerland	Lampre–Daikin	11	
62	Simone Bertoletti	Italy	Lampre–Daikin	83	
63	Massimo Codol	Italy	Lampre–Daikin	DNF	
64	Marco Della Vedova	Italy	Lampre–Daikin	42	
65	Matteo Frutti	Italy	Lampre–Daikin	95	
66	Gabriele Missaglia	Italy	Lampre–Daikin	16	
67	Pavel Padrnos	Czech Republic	Lampre–Daikin	18	
68	Mariano Piccoli	Italy	Lampre–Daikin	38	
69	Ján Svorada	Czech Republic	Lampre–Daikin	DNF	
71	Nicola Miceli	Italy	Liquigas	20	
72	Andrey Teteryuk	Kazakhstan	Liquigas	22	
73	Cristiano Frattini	Italy	Liquigas	61	
74	Endrio Leoni	Italy	Liquigas	DNF	
75	Biagio Conte	Italy	Liquigas	87	
76	Oscar Mason	Italy	Liquigas	25	
77	Rodolfo Ongarato	Italy	Liquigas	96	
78	Fausto Dotti	Italy	Liquigas	53	
79	Ruslan Ivanov	Moldova	Liquigas	77	
81	Paolo Bettini	Italy	Mapei–Quick-Step	44	
82	Giuseppe Di Grande	Italy	Mapei–Quick-Step	17	
83	Giuliano Figueras	Italy	Mapei–Quick-Step	36	
84	Paolo Fornaciari	Italy	Mapei–Quick-Step	100	
85	Dirk Müller	Germany	Mapei–Quick-Step	DNF	
86	Chann McRae	United States	Mapei–Quick-Step	48	
87	Andrea Noè	Italy	Mapei–Quick-Step	28	
88	Andrea Tafi	Italy	Mapei–Quick-Step	80	
89	Max van Heeswijk	Netherlands	Mapei–Quick-Step	DNF	
91	Pascal Richard	Switzerland	Mobilvetta Design–Northwave	55	
92	Alessandro Spezialetti	Italy	Mobilvetta Design–Northwave	37	
93	Gorazd Štangelj	Slovenia	Mobilvetta Design–Northwave	DNF	
94	Paolo Valoti	Italy	Mobilvetta Design–Northwave	65	
95	Ivan Quaranta	Italy	Mobilvetta Design–Northwave	DNF	
96	Massimo Strazzer	Italy	Mobilvetta Design–Northwave	108	
97	Stefano Faustini	Italy	Mobilvetta Design–Northwave	111	
98	Mirco Gualdi	Italy	Mobilvetta Design–Northwave	DNF	
99	Guido Trombetta	Italy	Mobilvetta Design–Northwave	DNF	
101	Niklas Axelsson	Sweden	Navigare–Gaerne	6	
102	Gabriele Balducci	Italy	Navigare–Gaerne	102	
103	Dario Pieri	Italy	Navigare–Gaerne	81	
104	Vladimir Duma	Ukraine	Navigare–Gaerne	40	
105	Luca Cei	Italy	Navigare–Gaerne	DNF	
106	Alessandro Petacchi	Italy	Navigare–Gaerne	70	
107	Gerrit Glomser	Austria	Navigare–Gaerne	26	
108	Stefano Panetta	Italy	Navigare–Gaerne	62	
109	Aldo Zanetti	Italy	Navigare–Gaerne	DNF	
111	David Cañada	Spain	ONCE–Deutsche Bank	89	
112	Íñigo Cuesta	Spain	ONCE–Deutsche Bank	72	
113	Santos González	Spain	ONCE–Deutsche Bank	85	
114	Laurent Jalabert	France	ONCE–Deutsche Bank	4	
115	Peter Luttenberger	Austria	ONCE–Deutsche Bank	19	
116	Miguel Ángel Martín Perdiguero	Spain	ONCE–Deutsche Bank	73	
117	Andrea Peron	Italy	ONCE–Deutsche Bank	56	
118	Carlos Sastre	Spain	ONCE–Deutsche Bank	101	
119	Mikel Zarrabeitia	Spain	ONCE–Deutsche Bank	29	
121	Carlo Marino Bianchi	Italy	Riso Scotti–Vinavil	105	
122	Diego Ferrari	Italy	Riso Scotti–Vinavil	82	
123	Ivan Basso	Italy	Riso Scotti–Vinavil	DNF	
124	Samuele Schiavina	Italy	Riso Scotti–Vinavil	99	
125	Alexandr Shefer	Kazakhstan	Riso Scotti–Vinavil	21	
126	Oscar Pozzi	Italy	Riso Scotti–Vinavil	49	
127	Filippo Simeoni	Italy	Riso Scotti–Vinavil	90	
128	Alain Turicchia	Italy	Riso Scotti–Vinavil	97	
129	Giuseppe Palumbo	Italy	Riso Scotti–Vinavil	DNF	
131	Mario Cipollini	Italy	Saeco–Cannondale	DNF	
132	Paolo Savoldelli	Italy	Saeco–Cannondale	2	
133	Giuseppe Calcaterra	Italy	Saeco–Cannondale	109	
134	Gian Matteo Fagnini	Italy	Saeco–Cannondale	86	
135	Dario Frigo	Italy	Saeco–Cannondale	DNF	
136	Alessio Galletti	Italy	Saeco–Cannondale	114	
137	Roberto Petito	Italy	Saeco–Cannondale	60	
138	Mario Scirea	Italy	Saeco–Cannondale	67	
139	Francesco Secchiari	Italy	Saeco–Cannondale	27	
141	Enrico Cassani	Italy	Team Polti	69	
142	Mirko Celestino	Italy	Team Polti	74	
143	Ivan Gotti	Italy	Team Polti	1	
144	Fabrizio Guidi	Italy	Team Polti	64	
145	Stéphane Goubert	France	Team Polti	DNF	
146	Oscar Pelliccioli	Italy	Team Polti	76	
147	Davide Rebellin	Italy	Team Polti	30	
148	Richard Virenque	France	Team Polti	14	
149	Denis Zanette	Italy	Team Polti	107	
151	Jeroen Blijlevens	Netherlands	TVM–Farm Frites	DNF	
152	Davide Casarotto	Italy	TVM–Farm Frites	DNF	
153	Hendrik Van Dijck	Belgium	TVM–Farm Frites	116	
154	Sergei Ivanov	Russia	TVM–Farm Frites	DNF	
155	Andreas Klier	Germany	TVM–Farm Frites	78	
156	Michel Lafis	Sweden	TVM–Farm Frites	91	
157	Olivier Asmaker	France	TVM–Farm Frites	DNF	
158	Pieter Vries	Netherlands	TVM–Farm Frites	DNF	
159	Miguel van Kessel	Netherlands	TVM–Farm Frites	115	
161	Massimo Apollonio	Italy	Vini Caldirola	98	
162	Andrej Hauptman	Slovenia	Vini Caldirola	DNF	
163	Filippo Casagrande	Italy	Vini Caldirola	54	
164	Massimo Donati	Italy	Vini Caldirola	47	
165	Serhiy Honchar	Ukraine	Vini Caldirola	7	
166	Gianluca Sironi	Italy	Vini Caldirola	71	
167	Mauro Radaelli	Italy	Vini Caldirola	104	
168	Romāns Vainšteins	Latvia	Vini Caldirola	DNF	
169	Mauro Zanetti	Italy	Vini Caldirola	31	
171	Daniel Clavero	Spain	Vitalicio Seguros	9	
172	Santiago Blanco	Spain	Vitalicio Seguros	DNF	
173	Hernán Buenahora	Colombia	Vitalicio Seguros	15	
174	Andrei Zintchenko	Russia	Vitalicio Seguros	12	
175	Serguei Smetanine	Russia	Vitalicio Seguros	92	
176	Prudencio Induráin	Spain	Vitalicio Seguros	45	
177	Francisco Cerezo	Spain	Vitalicio Seguros	39	
178	Víctor Hugo Peña	Colombia	Vitalicio Seguros	63	
179	Ginés Salmerón	Spain	Vitalicio Seguros	93	
