= 1998 Vuelta a España, Stage 1 to Stage 11 =

Cycling race stages

The 1998 Vuelta a España was the 53rd edition of the Vuelta a España, one of cycling's Grand Tours. The Vuelta began in Córdoba on 5 September, and Stage 11 occurred on 16 September with a stage to Cerler. The race finished in Madrid on 27 September.

== Stage 1 ==
5 September 1998 — Córdoba to Córdoba, 161.7 km (100.5 mi)

Stage 1 result

Rank	Rider	Team	Time
1	Markus Zberg (SUI)	Post Swiss Team	4h 11' 08"
2	Giuliano Figueras (ITA)	Mapei–Bricobi	s.t.
3	Laurent Jalabert (FRA)	ONCE	s.t.
4	Andrei Tchmil (UKR)	Lotto–Mobistar	s.t.
5	Martin Rittsel (SWE)	Cantina Tollo–Alexia Alluminio	s.t.
6	Elio Aggiano (ITA)	Vitalicio Seguros	s.t.
7	Peter Van Petegem (BEL)	TVM–Farm Frites	s.t.
8	Ángel Edo (ESP)	Kelme–Costa Blanca	s.t.
9	Nico Mattan (BEL)	Mapei–Bricobi	s.t.
10	Fabrizio Guidi (ITA)	Team Polti	s.t.

General classification after Stage 1

Rank	Rider	Team	Time
1	Markus Zberg (SUI)	Post Swiss Team	4h 10' 56"
2	Giuliano Figueras (ITA)	Mapei–Bricobi	+ 4"
3	Laurent Jalabert (FRA)	ONCE	s.t.
4	Fabrizio Guidi (ITA)	Team Polti	+ 9"
5	Unai Etxebarria (VEN)	Euskaltel–Euskadi	s.t.
6	Francisco Cerezo (ESP)	Estepona en Marcha–Brepac	+ 10"
7	Andrei Tchmil (UKR)	Lotto–Mobistar	+ 12"
8	Martin Rittsel (SWE)	Cantina Tollo–Alexia Alluminio	s.t.
9	Elio Aggiano (ITA)	Vitalicio Seguros	s.t.
10	Peter Van Petegem (BEL)	TVM–Farm Frites	s.t.

== Stage 2 ==
6 September 1998 — Córdoba to Cádiz, 234.6 km (145.8 mi)

Stage 2 result

Rank	Rider	Team	Time
1	Jeroen Blijlevens (NED)	TVM–Farm Frites	6h 30' 24"
2	Giovanni Lombardi (ITA)	Team Telekom	s.t.
3	Robbie McEwen (AUS)	Rabobank	s.t.
4	Ján Svorada (CZE)	Mapei–Bricobi	s.t.
5	Henk Vogels (AUS)	Crédit Agricole	s.t.
6	Elio Aggiano (ITA)	Vitalicio Seguros	s.t.
7	Sven Teutenberg (GER)	U.S. Postal Service	s.t.
8	Fabrizio Guidi (ITA)	Team Polti	s.t.
9	Andrei Tchmil (UKR)	Lotto–Mobistar	s.t.
10	Marcel Wüst (GER)	Festina–Lotus	s.t.

General classification after Stage 2

Rank	Rider	Team	Time
1	Markus Zberg (SUI)	Post Swiss Team	10h 41' 20"
2	Laurent Jalabert (FRA)	ONCE	+ 1"
3	Giuliano Figueras (ITA)	Mapei–Bricobi	+ 4"
4	Fabrizio Guidi (ITA)	Team Polti	+ 5"
5	Unai Etxebarria (VEN)	Euskaltel–Euskadi	+ 9"
6	Francisco Cerezo (ESP)	Estepona en Marcha–Brepac	+ 10"
7	Philippe Gaumont (FRA)	Cofidis	+ 11"
8	Elio Aggiano (ITA)	Vitalicio Seguros	+ 12"
9	Andrei Tchmil (UKR)	Lotto–Mobistar	s.t.
10	Ángel Edo (ESP)	Kelme–Costa Blanca	s.t.

== Stage 3 ==
7 September 1998 — Cádiz to Estepona, 192.6 km (119.7 mi)

Stage 3 result

Rank	Rider	Team	Time
1	Jaan Kirsipuu (EST)	Casino–Ag2r	4h 16' 24"
2	Marcel Wüst (GER)	Festina–Lotus	s.t.
3	Giovanni Lombardi (ITA)	Team Telekom	s.t.
4	Jeroen Blijlevens (NED)	TVM–Farm Frites	s.t.
5	Ivan Cerioli (ITA)	Estepona en Marcha–Brepac	s.t.
6	Guido Trenti (USA)	Cantina Tollo–Alexia Alluminio	s.t.
7	Martin Hvastija (SLO)	Cantina Tollo–Alexia Alluminio	s.t.
8	Robbie McEwen (AUS)	Rabobank	s.t.
9	Frédéric Moncassin (FRA)	Crédit Agricole	s.t.
10	Markus Zberg (SUI)	Post Swiss Team	s.t.

General classification after Stage 3

Rank	Rider	Team	Time
1	Laurent Jalabert (FRA)	ONCE	14h 57' 51"
2	Markus Zberg (SUI)	Post Swiss Team	+ 2"
3	Philippe Gaumont (FRA)	Cofidis	+ 6"
4	Giuliano Figueras (ITA)	Mapei–Bricobi	+ 7"
5	Fabrizio Guidi (ITA)	Team Polti	+ 8"
6	Unai Etxebarria (VEN)	Euskaltel–Euskadi	+ 12"
7	Ludo Dierckxsens (BEL)	Lotto–Mobistar	+ 13"
8	Álvaro González de Galdeano (ESP)	Euskaltel–Euskadi	+ 14"
9	Andrei Tchmil (UKR)	Lotto–Mobistar	+ 15"
10	Salvatore Commesso (ITA)	Saeco–Cannondale	s.t.

== Stage 4 ==
8 September 1998 — Málaga to Granada, 173.5 km (107.8 mi)

Stage 4 result

Rank	Rider	Team	Time
1	Fabrizio Guidi (ITA)	Team Polti	4h 27' 22"
2	Giovanni Lombardi (ITA)	Team Telekom	s.t.
3	Jeroen Blijlevens (NED)	TVM–Farm Frites	s.t.
4	Marcel Wüst (GER)	Festina–Lotus	s.t.
5	Ángel Edo (ESP)	Kelme–Costa Blanca	s.t.
6	Alessandro Bertolini (ITA)	Cofidis	s.t.
7	Cristian Moreni (ITA)	Brescialat–Liquigas	s.t.
8	Serguei Smetanine (RUS)	Vitalicio Seguros	s.t.
9	Laurent Jalabert (FRA)	ONCE	s.t.
10	Philippe Gaumont (FRA)	Cofidis	s.t.

General classification after Stage 4

Rank	Rider	Team	Time
1	Fabrizio Guidi (ITA)	Team Polti	19h 24' 57"
2	Laurent Jalabert (FRA)	ONCE	+ 2"
3	Markus Zberg (SUI)	Post Swiss Team	+ 5"
4	Philippe Gaumont (FRA)	Cofidis	+ 12"
5	Giuliano Figueras (ITA)	Mapei–Bricobi	+ 13"
6	Melcior Mauri (ESP)	ONCE	+ 18"
7	Unai Etxebarria (VEN)	Euskaltel–Euskadi	s.t.
8	José Vicente García (ESP)	Banesto	s.t.
9	Ludo Dierckxsens (BEL)	Lotto–Mobistar	+ 19"
10	David Etxebarria (ESP)	ONCE	s.t.

== Stage 5 ==
9 September 1998 — Olula del Río to Murcia, 165.5 km (102.8 mi)

Stage 5 result

Rank	Rider	Team	Time
1	Jeroen Blijlevens (NED)	TVM–Farm Frites	3h 41' 31"
2	Giovanni Lombardi (ITA)	Team Telekom	s.t.
3	Sven Teutenberg (GER)	U.S. Postal Service	s.t.
4	Ángel Edo (ESP)	Kelme–Costa Blanca	s.t.
5	Jaan Kirsipuu (EST)	Casino–Ag2r	s.t.
6	Martin Hvastija (SLO)	Cantina Tollo–Alexia Alluminio	s.t.
7	Fabrizio Guidi (ITA)	Team Polti	s.t.
8	Ivan Cerioli (ITA)	Estepona en Marcha–Brepac	s.t.
9	Giancarlo Raimondi (ITA)	Brescialat–Liquigas	s.t.
10	Marcel Wüst (GER)	Festina–Lotus	s.t.

General classification after Stage 5

Rank	Rider	Team	Time
1	Fabrizio Guidi (ITA)	Team Polti	23h 06' 28"
2	Laurent Jalabert (FRA)	ONCE	+ 2"
3	Markus Zberg (SUI)	Post Swiss Team	+ 5"
4	Philippe Gaumont (FRA)	Cofidis	+ 12"
5	Elio Aggiano (ITA)	Vitalicio Seguros	+ 13"
6	Giuliano Figueras (ITA)	Mapei–Bricobi	s.t.
7	José Luis Rubiera (ESP)	Kelme–Costa Blanca	+ 16"
8	Unai Etxebarria (VEN)	Euskaltel–Euskadi	+ 18"
9	Melcior Mauri (ESP)	ONCE	s.t.
10	José Vicente García (ESP)	Banesto	s.t.

== Stage 6 ==
10 September 1998 — Murcia to Xorret de Catí, 201.5 km (125.2 mi)

Stage 6 result

Rank	Rider	Team	Time
1	José María Jiménez (ESP)	Banesto	5h 17' 57"
2	Roberto Heras (ESP)	Kelme–Costa Blanca	+ 27"
3	Laurent Jalabert (FRA)	ONCE	+ 47"
~~4~~	~~Lance Armstrong (USA)~~	~~U.S. Postal Service~~	~~s.t.~~
5	Oscar Camenzind (SUI)	Mapei–Bricobi	s.t.
6	Abraham Olano (ESP)	Banesto	s.t.
7	Fernando Escartín (ESP)	Kelme–Costa Blanca	s.t.
8	Dario Frigo (ITA)	Saeco–Cannondale	s.t.
9	Manuel Beltrán (ESP)	Banesto	s.t.
10	Marcos-Antonio Serrano (ESP)	Kelme–Costa Blanca	s.t.

General classification after Stage 6

Rank	Rider	Team	Time
1	José María Jiménez (ESP)	Banesto	28h 24' 34"
2	Roberto Heras (ESP)	Kelme–Costa Blanca	+ 31"
3	Laurent Jalabert (FRA)	ONCE	+ 36"
4	Abraham Olano (ESP)	Banesto	+ 58"
5	Dario Frigo (ITA)	Saeco–Cannondale	+ 59"
6	Manuel Beltrán (ESP)	Banesto	s.t.
7	Fernando Escartín (ESP)	Kelme–Costa Blanca	s.t.
8	Oscar Camenzind (SUI)	Mapei–Bricobi	s.t.
9	Daniel Clavero (ESP)	Vitalicio Seguros	s.t.
10	Claus Michael Møller (DEN)	TVM–Farm Frites	s.t.

== Stage 7 ==
11 September 1998 — Alicante to Valencia, 185 km (115 mi)

Stage 7 result

Rank	Rider	Team	Time
1	Giovanni Lombardi (ITA)	Team Telekom	4h 03' 49"
2	Jeroen Blijlevens (NED)	TVM–Farm Frites	s.t.
3	Marcel Wüst (GER)	Festina–Lotus	s.t.
4	Lauri Aus (ESP)	Casino–Ag2r	s.t.
5	Ángel Edo (ESP)	Kelme–Costa Blanca	s.t.
6	Salvatore Commesso (ITA)	Saeco–Cannondale	s.t.
7	Fabrizio Guidi (ITA)	Team Polti	s.t.
8	Léon van Bon (NED)	Rabobank	s.t.
9	Eleuterio Anguita (ESP)	Estepona en Marcha–Brepac	s.t.
10	Serguei Smetanine (RUS)	Vitalicio Seguros	s.t.

General classification after Stage 7

Rank	Rider	Team	Time
1	José María Jiménez (ESP)	Banesto	32h 28' 23"
2	Roberto Heras (ESP)	Kelme–Costa Blanca	+ 31"
3	Laurent Jalabert (FRA)	ONCE	+ 34"
4	Abraham Olano (ESP)	Banesto	+ 58"
5	Manuel Beltrán (ESP)	Banesto	+ 59"
6	Dario Frigo (ITA)	Saeco–Cannondale	s.t.
7	Fernando Escartín (ESP)	Kelme–Costa Blanca	s.t.
8	Oscar Camenzind (SUI)	Mapei–Bricobi	s.t.
9	Daniel Clavero (ESP)	Vitalicio Seguros	s.t.
10	Claus Michael Møller (DEN)	TVM–Farm Frites	s.t.

== Stage 8 ==
12 September 1998 — Palma de Mallorca to Palma de Mallorca, 181.5 km (112.8 mi)

Stage 8 result

Rank	Rider	Team	Time
1	Fabrizio Guidi (ITA)	Team Polti	4h 16' 21"
2	Peter Van Petegem (BEL)	TVM–Farm Frites	s.t.
3	Andrei Tchmil (UKR)	Lotto–Mobistar	s.t.
4	Nico Mattan (BEL)	Mapei–Bricobi	s.t.
5	Markus Zberg (SUI)	Post Swiss Team	s.t.
6	Martin Hvastija (SLO)	Cantina Tollo–Alexia Alluminio	s.t.
7	Pascal Chanteur (FRA)	Casino–Ag2r	s.t.
8	Marco Serpellini (ITA)	Brescialat–Liquigas	s.t.
9	Laurent Jalabert (FRA)	ONCE	s.t.
10	Ángel Castresana (ESP)	Euskaltel–Euskadi	s.t.

General classification after Stage 8

Rank	Rider	Team	Time
1	José María Jiménez (ESP)	Banesto	36h 44' 44"
2	Roberto Heras (ESP)	Kelme–Costa Blanca	+ 31"
3	Laurent Jalabert (FRA)	ONCE	+ 33"
~~4~~	~~Lance Armstrong (USA)~~	~~U.S. Postal Service~~	~~+ 56"~~
5	Abraham Olano (ESP)	Banesto	+ 58"
6	Daniel Clavero (ESP)	Vitalicio Seguros	s.t.
7	Manuel Beltrán (ESP)	Banesto	+ 59"
8	Dario Frigo (ITA)	Saeco–Cannondale	s.t.
9	Fernando Escartín (ESP)	Kelme–Costa Blanca	s.t.
10	Oscar Camenzind (SUI)	Mapei–Bricobi	s.t.

== Stage 9 ==
13 September 1998 — Alcúdia to Alcúdia, 39.5 km (24.5 mi) (ITT)

Stage 9 result

Rank	Rider	Team	Time
1	Abraham Olano (ESP)	Banesto	47' 07"
2	Melcior Mauri (ESP)	ONCE	+ 41"
3	Uwe Peschel (GER)	Estepona en Marcha–Brepac	+ 1' 03"
4	Laurent Jalabert (FRA)	ONCE	+ 1' 06"
5	Serhiy Honchar (RUS)	Cantina Tollo–Alexia Alluminio	+ 1' 12"
~~6~~	~~Lance Armstrong (USA)~~	~~U.S. Postal Service~~	~~+ 1' 32"~~
7	Claus Michael Møller (DEN)	TVM–Farm Frites	+ 1' 47"
8	Álvaro González de Galdeano (ESP)	Euskaltel–Euskadi	+ 1' 51"
9	Servais Knaven (NED)	TVM–Farm Frites	+ 1' 53"
10	Víctor Hugo Peña (COL)	Avianca-Telecom	+ 1' 54"

General classification after Stage 9

Rank	Rider	Team	Time
1	Abraham Olano (ESP)	Banesto	37h 32' 49"
2	Laurent Jalabert (FRA)	ONCE	+ 41"
3	Melcior Mauri (ESP)	ONCE	+ 1' 08"
~~4~~	~~Lance Armstrong (USA)~~	~~U.S. Postal Service~~	~~+ 1' 30"~~
5	Claus Michael Møller (DEN)	TVM–Farm Frites	+ 1' 48"
6	Álvaro González de Galdeano (ESP)	Euskaltel–Euskadi	+ 2' 06"
7	Daniel Clavero (ESP)	Vitalicio Seguros	+ 2' 20"
8	Alex Zülle (SUI)	Festina–Lotus	+ 2' 25"
9	Fernando Escartín (ESP)	Kelme–Costa Blanca	s.t.
10	Marco Serpellini (ITA)	Brescialat–Liquigas	+ 2' 35"

== Rest day ==
14 September 1998 — Province of Barcelona

== Stage 10 ==
15 September 1998 — Vic to Estación de Pal, 199.3 km (123.8 mi)

Stage 10 result

Rank	Rider	Team	Time
1	José María Jiménez (ESP)	Banesto	5h 22' 39"
2	Fernando Escartín (ESP)	Kelme–Costa Blanca	+ 16"
3	Roberto Heras (ESP)	Kelme–Costa Blanca	+ 1' 26"
4	Oscar Camenzind (SUI)	Mapei–Bricobi	+ 1' 31"
5	Daniel Clavero (ESP)	Vitalicio Seguros	s.t.
6	Gilberto Simoni (ITA)	Cantina Tollo–Alexia Alluminio	s.t.
7	Laurent Jalabert (FRA)	ONCE	s.t.
8	Manuel Beltrán (ESP)	Banesto	s.t.
9	José Castelblanco (COL)	Avianca-Telecom	s.t.
10	Alex Zülle (SUI)	Festina–Lotus	s.t.

General classification after Stage 10

Rank	Rider	Team	Time
1	Abraham Olano (ESP)	Banesto	42h 56' 59"
2	Laurent Jalabert (FRA)	ONCE	+ 41"
3	Fernando Escartín (ESP)	Kelme–Costa Blanca	+ 1' 10"
4	José María Jiménez (ESP)	Banesto	+ 1' 36"
5	Álvaro González de Galdeano (ESP)	Euskaltel–Euskadi	+ 2' 06"
~~6~~	~~Lance Armstrong (USA)~~	~~U.S. Postal Service~~	~~+ 2' 18"~~
7	Daniel Clavero (ESP)	Vitalicio Seguros	+ 2' 20"
8	Alex Zülle (SUI)	Festina–Lotus	+ 2' 25"
9	Roberto Heras (ESP)	Kelme–Costa Blanca	+ 2' 43"
10	Oscar Camenzind (SUI)	Mapei–Bricobi	+ 2' 44"

== Stage 11 ==
16 September 1998 — Andorra la Vella to Cerler, 186 km (116 mi)

Stage 11 result

Rank	Rider	Team	Time
1	José María Jiménez (ESP)	Banesto	4h 55' 05"
2	Roberto Heras (ESP)	Kelme–Costa Blanca	s.t.
3	Fernando Escartín (ESP)	Kelme–Costa Blanca	s.t.
4	Daniel Clavero (ESP)	Vitalicio Seguros	s.t.
5	Alex Zülle (SUI)	Festina–Lotus	+ 13"
6	Laurent Jalabert (FRA)	ONCE	s.t.
7	Manuel Beltrán (ESP)	Banesto	s.t.
8	Abraham Olano (ESP)	Banesto	+ 19"
9	Marcos-Antonio Serrano (ESP)	Kelme–Costa Blanca	s.t.
10	Gianluca Valoti (ITA)	Team Polti	s.t.

General classification after Stage 11

Rank	Rider	Team	Time
1	Abraham Olano (ESP)	Banesto	47h 52' 23"
2	Laurent Jalabert (FRA)	ONCE	+ 35"
3	Fernando Escartín (ESP)	Kelme–Costa Blanca	+ 51"
4	José María Jiménez (ESP)	Banesto	+ 1' 17"
5	Daniel Clavero (ESP)	Vitalicio Seguros	+ 2' 01"
6	Álvaro González de Galdeano (ESP)	Euskaltel–Euskadi	+ 2' 09"
7	Alex Zülle (SUI)	Festina–Lotus	+ 2' 19"
8	Roberto Heras (ESP)	Kelme–Costa Blanca	+ 2' 24"
~~9~~	~~Lance Armstrong (USA)~~	~~U.S. Postal Service~~	~~+ 2' 44"~~
10	Oscar Camenzind (SUI)	Mapei–Bricobi	+ 2' 47"
