= 1998 Vuelta a España =

53rd edition of the Vuelta a España

Race details
- Dates: 6–27 September
- Stages: 22
- Distance: 3,774 km (2,345 mi)
- Winning time: 93h 44' 08"

Results
| Jersey awarded to the overall winner | Winner | Abraham Olano (ESP) | (Banesto) |
| | Second | Fernando Escartín (ESP) | (Kelme–Costa Blanca) |
| | Third | José María Jiménez (ESP) | (Banesto) |
| Jersey awarded to the points classification winner | Points | Fabrizio Guidi (ITA) | (Team Polti) |
| Jersey awarded to the mountains classification winner | Mountains | José María Jiménez (ESP) | (Banesto) |
| Jersey awarded to the sprints classification winner | Sprints | Giancarlo Raimondi (ITA) | (Brescialat–Liquigas) |
| | Team | Banesto | |

The 53rd edition of the Vuelta a España was held 5 to 27 September 1998 and began in Córdoba and ended in Madrid. The 1998 Vuelta had 22 stages over 3,774 km (2,345 mi) with the winning average speed of 40.262 km/h (25.018 mph). Spaniard Abraham Olano took the leader's jersey after the first individual time trial with 41 seconds over Frenchman Laurent Jalabert. Olano's lead in the mountains decreased each stage as teammate José María Jiménez marked Olano's rivals and took several stage wins in the process until Jiménez took the jersey from Olano on the final mountain stage to Alto de Navacerrada with Olano in third place at 38 seconds. On the following day's individual time trial, Olano took back the lead to win the only Grand Tour of his career.

The race also saw the astonishing comeback of Lance Armstrong after he was diagnosed with advanced testicular cancer in 1996. Armstrong's fourth-place finish was stripped by USADA in 2012 due to doping.

== Teams ==
A total of 22 teams were invited to participate in the 1998 Vuelta a España. Seventeen of the competing squads were Trade Team I teams, four teams were Trade Team II teams, while the other team was Trade Team III. Each team sent a squad of nine riders, so the Vuelta began with a peloton of 198 cyclists, a total of 108 riders made it to the finish in Madrid.

The 22 teams invited to the race were:

Trade Team I teams

- Banesto
- Cantina Tollo–Alexia Alluminio
- Casino–Ag2r
- Cofidis
- Festina–Lotus
- Kelme–Costa Blanca
- Lotto–Mobistar
- Mapei–Bricobi
- ONCE
- Rabobank
- Saeco–Cannondale
- Team Polti
- Team Telekom
- TVM–Farm Frites
- U.S. Postal Service
- Vitalicio Seguros
- Crédit Agricole

Trade Team II teams

- Brescialat–Liquigas
- Estepona en Marcha–Brepac
- Euskaltel–Euskadi
- Post Swiss Team

Trade Team III teams

- Avianca–Telecom

== Stages ==
Stage characteristics and winners
| Stage | Date | Course | Distance | Type | Winner |
|---|---|---|---|---|---|
| 1 | 5 September | Córdoba | 161.7 km (100 mi) | Hilly stage | Markus Zberg (SUI) |
| 2 | 6 September | Córdoba to Cádiz | 234.6 km (146 mi) | Flat stage | Jeroen Blijlevens (NED) |
| 3 | 7 September | Cádiz to Estepona | 192.6 km (120 mi) | Flat stage | Jaan Kirsipuu (EST) |
| 4 | 8 September | Málaga to Granada | 173.5 km (108 mi) | Hilly stage | Fabrizio Guidi (ITA) |
| 5 | 9 September | Olula del Río to Murcia | 165.5 km (103 mi) | Flat stage | Jeroen Blijlevens (NED) |
| 6 | 10 September | Murcia to Xorret de Catí | 201.5 km (125 mi) | Mountain stage | José María Jiménez (ESP) |
| 7 | 11 September | Alicante to Valencia | 185 km (115 mi) | Flat stage | Giovanni Lombardi (ITA) |
| 8 | 12 September | Palma de Mallorca | 181.5 km (113 mi) | Hilly stage | Fabrizio Guidi (ITA) |
| 9 | 13 September | Alcúdia | 39.5 km (25 mi) | Individual time trial | Abraham Olano (ESP) |
| | 14 September | Province of Barcelona | | Rest day | |
| 10 | 15 September | Vic to Estación de Pal (Andorra) | 199.3 km (124 mi) | Mountain stage | José María Jiménez (ESP) |
| 11 | 16 September | Andorra la Vella (Andorra) to Cerler | 186 km (116 mi) | Mountain stage | José María Jiménez (ESP) |
| 12 | 17 September | Benasque to Jaca, Canfranc International station | 187 km (116 mi) | Hilly stage | Gianni Bugno (ITA) |
| 13 | 18 September | Sabiñánigo | 208.5 km (130 mi) | Hilly stage | Andrei Zintchenko (RUS) |
| 14 | 19 September | Biescas to Zaragoza | 145.5 km (90 mi) | Flat stage | Marcel Wüst (GER) |
| 15 | 20 September | Zaragoza to Soria | 178.7 km (111 mi) | Flat stage | Andrei Zintchenko (RUS) |
| 16 | 21 September | Soria to Laguna Negra de Neila | 143.7 km (89 mi) | Mountain stage | José María Jiménez (ESP) |
| 17 | 22 September | Burgos to León | 188.5 km (117 mi) | Flat stage | Marcel Wüst (GER) |
| 18 | 23 September | León to Salamanca | 223 km (139 mi) | Flat stage | Fabrizio Guidi (ITA) |
| 19 | 24 September | Ávila to Segovia | 170.4 km (106 mi) | Mountain stage | Roberto Heras (ESP) |
| 20 | 25 September | Segovia to Alto de Navacerrada | 206 km (128 mi) | Mountain stage | Andrei Zintchenko (RUS) |
| 21 | 26 September | Fuenlabrada | 39 km (24 mi) | Individual time trial | Alex Zülle (SUI) |
| 22 | 27 September | Madrid | 163 km (101 mi) | Flat stage | Markus Zberg (SUI) |
| | Total | | 3,774 km (2,345 mi) | | |

== Classification leadership ==
Classification leadership by stage
| Stage | Winner | General classification | Points classification | Mountains classification | Sprints rider classification | Team classification |
|---|---|---|---|---|---|---|
| 1 | Markus Zberg | Markus Zberg | Markus Zberg | Francisco Cerezo | Giancarlo Raimondi | Mapei–Bricobi |
| 2 | Jeroen Blijlevens | Markus Zberg | Markus Zberg | Francisco Cerezo | Giancarlo Raimondi | Mapei–Bricobi |
| 3 | Jaan Kirsipuu | Laurent Jalabert | Jaan Kirsipuu | Francisco Cerezo | Laurent Jalabert | Mapei–Bricobi |
| 4 | Fabrizio Guidi | Fabrizio Guidi | Giovanni Lombardi | Francisco Cerezo | Laurent Jalabert | Mapei–Bricobi |
| 5 | Jeroen Blijlevens | Fabrizio Guidi | Jeroen Blijlevens | Francisco Cerezo | Laurent Jalabert | Lotto–Mobistar |
| 6 | José María Jiménez | José María Jiménez | Jeroen Blijlevens | Francisco Cerezo | Laurent Jalabert | Banesto |
| 7 | Giovanni Lombardi | José María Jiménez | Jeroen Blijlevens | Francisco Cerezo | Giancarlo Raimondi | Banesto |
| 8 | Fabrizio Guidi | José María Jiménez | Jeroen Blijlevens | Francisco Cerezo | Giancarlo Raimondi | Banesto |
| 9 | Abraham Olano | Abraham Olano | Jeroen Blijlevens | Laurent Jalabert | Giancarlo Raimondi | ONCE |
| 10 | José María Jiménez | Abraham Olano | Jeroen Blijlevens | José María Jiménez | Giancarlo Raimondi | Banesto |
| 11 | José María Jiménez | Abraham Olano | Jeroen Blijlevens | José María Jiménez | Giancarlo Raimondi | Banesto |
| 12 | Gianni Bugno | Abraham Olano | Jeroen Blijlevens | José María Jiménez | Giancarlo Raimondi | Banesto |
| 13 | Andrei Zintchenko | Abraham Olano | Fabrizio Guidi | José María Jiménez | Giancarlo Raimondi | Banesto |
| 14 | Marcel Wüst | Abraham Olano | Fabrizio Guidi | José María Jiménez | Giancarlo Raimondi | Banesto |
| 15 | Andrei Zintchenko | Abraham Olano | Fabrizio Guidi | José María Jiménez | Giancarlo Raimondi | Banesto |
| 16 | José María Jiménez | Abraham Olano | Fabrizio Guidi | José María Jiménez | Giancarlo Raimondi | Banesto |
| 17 | Marcel Wüst | Abraham Olano | Fabrizio Guidi | José María Jiménez | Giancarlo Raimondi | Banesto |
| 18 | Fabrizio Guidi | Abraham Olano | Fabrizio Guidi | José María Jiménez | Giancarlo Raimondi | Banesto |
| 19 | Roberto Heras | Abraham Olano | Fabrizio Guidi | José María Jiménez | Giancarlo Raimondi | Banesto |
| 20 | Andrei Zintchenko | José María Jiménez | Fabrizio Guidi | José María Jiménez | Giancarlo Raimondi | Banesto |
| 21 | Alex Zülle | Abraham Olano | Fabrizio Guidi | José María Jiménez | Giancarlo Raimondi | Banesto |
| 22 | Markus Zberg | Abraham Olano | Fabrizio Guidi | José María Jiménez | Giancarlo Raimondi | Banesto |
| Final | | Abraham Olano | Fabrizio Guidi | José María Jiménez | Giancarlo Raimondi | Banesto |

== Final standings ==
Legend
| General classification | Denotes the winner of the general classification | Mountains classification | Denotes the leader of the mountains classification |
| Points classification | Denotes the leader of the points classification | Mountains classification | Denotes the winner of the sprints classification |

=== General classification ===
Final general classification (1–10)
| Rank | Rider | Team | Time |
|---|---|---|---|
| 1 | Abraham Olano (ESP) | Banesto | 93h 44' 08" |
| 2 | Fernando Escartín (ESP) | Kelme–Costa Blanca | + 1' 23" |
| 3 | José María Jiménez (ESP) | Banesto | + 2' 12" |
| DSQ | ~~Lance Armstrong (USA)~~ | ~~U.S. Postal Service~~ | ~~+ 2' 18"~~ |
| 5 | Laurent Jalabert (FRA) | ONCE | + 2' 37" |
| 6 | Roberto Heras (ESP) | Kelme–Costa Blanca | + 2' 58" |
| 7 | Álvaro González de Galdeano (ESP) | Euskaltel–Euskadi | + 5' 51" |
| 8 | Alex Zülle (SUI) | Festina–Lotus | + 6' 05" |
| 9 | Marco Serpellini (ITA) | Brescialat–Liquigas | + 8' 58" |
| 10 | Marcos Serrano (ESP) | Kelme–Costa Blanca | + 10' 17" |

Final general classification (11–108)
| Rank | Rider | Team | Time |
|---|---|---|---|
| 11 | Richard Virenque (FRA) | Festina–Lotus | + 13' 33" |
| 108 | Germán Nieto (ESP) | Estepona en Marcha–Brepac | + 4h 09' 30" |

=== Points classification ===
Final points classification (1–10)
| Rank | Rider | Team | Points |
|---|---|---|---|
| 1 | Fabrizio Guidi (ITA) | Team Polti | 206 |
| 2 | Laurent Jalabert (FRA) | ONCE | 158 |
| 3 | José María Jiménez (ESP) | Banesto | 127 |
| 4 | Marcel Wüst (GER) | Festina–Lotus | 124 |
| 5 | Markus Zberg (SUI) | Post Swiss Team | 115 |
| 6 | Roberto Heras (ESP) | Kelme–Costa Blanca | 108 |
| 7 | Fernando Escartín (ESP) | Kelme–Costa Blanca | 102 |
| 8 | Giancarlo Raimondi (ITA) | Brescialat–Liquigas | 102 |
| 9 | Andrei Zintchenko (RUS) | Vitalicio Seguros | 101 |
| 10 | Abraham Olano (ESP) | Banesto | 96 |

=== Mountains classification ===
Final mountains classification (1–10)
| Rank | Rider | Team | Points |
|---|---|---|---|
| 1 | José María Jiménez (ESP) | Banesto | 184 |
| 2 | Laurent Jalabert (FRA) | ONCE | 93 |
| 3 | Fernando Escartín (ESP) | Kelme–Costa Blanca | 92 |
| 4 | Roberto Heras (ESP) | Kelme–Costa Blanca | 75 |
| 5 | Alex Zülle (SUI) | Festina–Lotus | 62 |
| 6 | Richard Virenque (FRA) | Festina–Lotus | 60 |
| 7 | José Luis Rubiera (ESP) | Kelme–Costa Blanca | 59 |
| 8 | Santiago Blanco (ESP) | Vitalicio Seguros | 56 |
| 9 | Oscar Camenzind (SUI) | Mapei–Bricobi | 54 |
| 10 | Juan Carlos Vicario (ESP) | Estepona en Marcha–Brepac | 48 |

=== Sprints classification ===
Final sprints classification (1–10)
| Rank | Rider | Team | Time |
|---|---|---|---|
| 1 | Giancarlo Raimondi (ITA) | Brescialat–Liquigas | 53 |
| 2 | Fabrizio Guidi (ITA) | Team Polti | 40 |
| 3 | José Luis Rubiera (ESP) | Kelme–Costa Blanca | 29 |
| 4 | Laurent Jalabert (FRA) | ONCE | 27 |
| 5 | Mirko Gualdi (ITA) | Team Polti | 14 |
| 6 | Andrei Zintchenko (RUS) | Vitalicio Seguros | 12 |
| 7 | Mariano Piccoli (ITA) | Brescialat–Liquigas | 11 |
| 8 | Roberto Sgambelluri (ITA) | Brescialat–Liquigas | 10 |
| 9 | Richard Virenque (FRA) | Festina–Lotus | 9 |
| 10 | Fabrice Gougot (FRA) | Casino–Ag2r | 9 |

=== Team classification ===
Final team classification (1–10)
| Rank | Team | Time |
|---|---|---|
| 1 | Banesto | 281h 14' 43" |
| 2 | Kelme–Costa Blanca | + 8' 58" |
| 3 | Festina–Lotus | + 28' 59" |
| 4 | Vitalicio Seguros | + 46' 10" |
| 5 | Euskaltel–Euskadi | + 1h 04' 17" |
| 6 | ONCE | + 1h 06' 36" |
| 7 | Avianca–Telecom | + 1h 41' 49" |
| 8 | Casino–Ag2r | + 2h 30' 29" |
| 9 | Brescialat–Liquigas | + 2h 48' 23" |
| 10 | Post Swiss Team | + 3h 07' 14" |
