= Valoti =

Valoti is a surname. Notable people with the surname include:

- Gianluca Valoti (born 1973), Italian racing cyclist
- Mattia Valoti (born 1993), Italian footballer
- Paolo Valoti (born 1971), Italian racing cyclist
