= 2001 La Flèche Wallonne =

Race details
- Dates: 18 April 2001
- Stages: 1
- Distance: 198 km (123.0 mi)
- Winning time: 4h 50' 03"

Results
	Winner	Rik Verbrugghe (BEL)	(Lotto–Adecco)
	Second	Ivan Basso (ITA)	(Fassa Bortolo)
	Third	Jörg Jaksche (GER)	(ONCE–Eroski)

The 2001 La Flèche Wallonne was the 65th edition of La Flèche Wallonne cycle race and was held on 18 April 2001. The race started in Charleroi and finished in Huy. The race was won by Rik Verbrugghe of the Lotto team.

== General classification ==
Final general classification

Rank	Rider	Team	Time
1	Rik Verbrugghe (BEL)	Lotto–Adecco	4h 50' 03"
2	Ivan Basso (ITA)	Fassa Bortolo	+ 5"
3	Jörg Jaksche (GER)	ONCE–Eroski	+ 12"
4	César Solaun (ESP)	iBanesto.com	+ 21"
5	David Etxebarria (ESP)	Euskaltel–Euskadi	+ 21"
6	Francesco Casagrande (ITA)	Fassa Bortolo	+ 21"
7	Dario Frigo (ITA)	Fassa Bortolo	+ 21"
8	Davide Rebellin (ITA)	Liquigas–Pata	+ 21"
9	Michael Boogerd (NED)	Rabobank	+ 21"
10	Peter Luttenberger (AUT)	Tacconi Sport–Vini Caldirola	+ 21"
