= 1998 Vuelta a Asturias =

Race details
- Dates: 12–17 May 1998
- Stages: 6
- Distance: 864.5 km (537.2 mi)
- Winning time: 22h 47' 02"

Results
Jersey awarded to the overall winner	Winner	Laurent Jalabert (FRA)	(ONCE)
	Second	José María Jiménez (ESP)	(Banesto)
	Third	Santiago Blanco (ESP)	(Vitalicio Seguros)

The 1998 Vuelta a Asturias was the 42nd edition of the Vuelta a Asturias road cycling stage race, which was held from 12 May to 17 May 1998. The race started in Gijón and finished in Oviedo. The race was won by Laurent Jalabert of the ONCE team.

== General classification ==
Final general classification

Rank	Rider	Team	Time
1	Laurent Jalabert (FRA)	ONCE	22h 47' 02"
2	José María Jiménez (ESP)	Banesto	+ 24"
3	Santiago Blanco (ESP)	Vitalicio Seguros	+ 30"
4	Rui Lavarinhas (POR)	Troiamarisco	+ 40"
5	Miguel Ángel Peña (ESP)	Banesto	+ 1' 08"
6	Roberto Heras (ESP)	Kelme–Costa Blanca	+ 1' 17"
7	Manuel Beltrán (ESP)	Banesto	+ 1' 18"
8	Ramón González Arrieta (ESP)	Euskaltel–Euskadi	+ 1' 19"
9	Fernando Escartín (ESP)	Kelme–Costa Blanca	+ 1' 29"
10	Timothy Jones (ZIM)	Amore & Vita–ForzArcore	+ 1' 51"
