= 1998 Three Days of De Panne =

Race details
- Dates: 31 March–2 April 1998
- Stages: 3
- Distance: 536.3 km (333.2 mi)
- Winning time: 12h 45' 45"

Results
	Winner	Michele Bartoli (ITA)
	Second	Emmanuel Magnien (FRA)
	Third	Viatcheslav Ekimov (RUS)

The 1998 Three Days of De Panne was the 22nd edition of the Three Days of De Panne cycle race and was held on 31 March to 2 April 1998. The race started in Harelbeke and finished in De Panne. The race was won by Michele Bartoli.

== General classification ==
Final general classification

Rank	Rider	Time
1	Michele Bartoli (ITA)	12h 45' 45"
2	Emmanuel Magnien (FRA)	+ 15"
3	Viatcheslav Ekimov (RUS)	+ 22"
4	Rolf Sørensen (DEN)	+ 24"
5	Fabrizio Guidi (ITA)	+ 31"
6	Nicolas Jalabert (FRA)	+ 38"
7	Davide Casarotto (ITA)	+ 42"
8	George Hincapie (USA)	+ 45"
9	Tristan Hoffman (NED)	+ 1' 01"
10	Marco Serpellini (ITA)	+ 1' 26"
