= 1998 Volta a Catalunya =

Race details
- Dates: 18–25 June 1998
- Stages: 8
- Distance: 1,228.4 km (763.3 mi)
- Winning time: 32h 59' 36"

Results
	Winner	Hernán Buenahora (COL)	(Vitalicio Seguros)
	Second	Georg Totschnig (AUT)	(Team Telekom)
	Third	Fernando Escartín (ESP)	(Kelme–Costa Blanca)
	Mountains	Alberto Elli (ITA)	(Casino–Ag2r)
	Sprints	Jacky Durand (FRA)	(Casino–Ag2r)
	Team	Avianca Telecom	

The 1998 Volta a Catalunya was the 78th edition of the Volta a Catalunya cycle race and was held from 18 June to 25 June 1998. The race started in Vila-seca and finished in Andorra la Vella. The race was won by Hernán Buenahora of the Vitalicio Seguros team.

== Teams ==
Sixteen teams of up to eight riders started the race:

- Casino–Ag2r
- Avianca Telecom
- Banesto
- Euskaltel–Euskadi
- GAN
- Kelme–Costa Blanca
- Lotto–Mobistar
- Mapei–Bricobi
- ONCE
- Estepona en Marcha–Brepac
- Saeco–Cannondale
- Team Telekom
- TVM–Farm Frites
- Mercatone Uno–Bianchi
- U.S. Postal Service
- Vitalicio Seguros

== Route ==
Stage characteristics and winners
Stage	Date	Course	Distance	Type	Winner
1a	18 June	Vila-seca to La Pineda	79.2 km (49.2 mi)		Mario Cipollini (ITA)
1b	18 June	Port Aventura to La Pineda	7.8 km (4.8 mi)	Individual time trial	Chris Boardman (GBR)
2	19 June	Port Aventura to El Vendrell	172.7 km (107.3 mi)		Mario Cipollini (ITA)
3	20 June	El Vendrell to Barcelona	151.3 km (94.0 mi)		Mario Cipollini (ITA)
4	21 June	La Piara to Manlleu	197.5 km (122.7 mi)		Mario Cipollini (ITA)
5	22 June	Girona to Girona	18 km (11.2 mi)	Individual time trial	Chris Boardman (GBR)
6	23 June	Tàrrega to Vall de Boí	180.4 km (112.1 mi)		Hernán Buenahora (COL)
7	24 June	Vall de Boí to Andorra	231.7 km (144.0 mi)		Hernán Buenahora (COL)
8	25 June	Andorra la Vella to Andorra la Vella	189.8 km (117.9 mi)		Fernando Escartín (ESP)

== General classification ==
Final general classification

Rank	Rider	Team	Time
1	Hernán Buenahora (COL)	Vitalicio Seguros	32h 59' 36"
2	Georg Totschnig (AUT)	Team Telekom	+ 8"
3	Fernando Escartín (ESP)	Kelme–Costa Blanca	+ 16"
4	Massimo Podenzana (ITA)	Mercatone Uno–Bianchi	+ 1' 05"
5	Alberto Elli (ITA)	Casino–Ag2r	+ 1' 37"
6	Abraham Olano (ESP)	Banesto	+ 1' 42"
7	José Castelblanco (COL)	Avianca Telecom	+ 2' 37"
8	Ángel Casero (ESP)	Vitalicio Seguros	+ 2' 47"
9	Jean-Cyril Robin (FRA)	U.S. Postal Service	+ 3' 01"
10	Víctor Hugo Peña (COL)	Avianca Telecom	+ 3' 15"
