= Vedova =

Vedova may refer to:

== People ==
- Emilio Vedova (1919–2006), Italian painter.
- Benedetto Della Vedova (born 1962), Italian politician
- Marco Della Vedova (born 1972), Italian cyclist

== Other uses ==
- La vedova scaltra, Italian opera-buffa
