= 1997 Vuelta a Asturias =

Race details
- Dates: 13–18 May 1997
- Stages: 6
- Distance: 867.8 km (539.2 mi)
- Winning time: 21h 56' 17"

Results
Jersey awarded to the overall winner	Winner	Manuel Fernández Ginés (ESP)	(Banesto)
	Second	Abraham Olano (ESP)	(Banesto)
	Third	Fernando Escartín (ESP)	(Kelme–Costa Blanca)

The 1997 Vuelta a Asturias was the 41st edition of the Vuelta a Asturias road cycling stage race, which was held from 13 May to 18 May 1997. The race started in Avilés and finished in Oviedo. The race was won by Manuel Fernández Ginés of the Banesto team.

== General classification ==
Final general classification

Rank	Rider	Team	Time
1	Manuel Fernández Ginés (ESP)	Banesto	21h 56' 17"
2	Abraham Olano (ESP)	Banesto	+ 13"
3	Fernando Escartín (ESP)	Kelme–Costa Blanca	+ 19"
4	Daniel Clavero (ESP)	Estepona en Marcha–Cafés Toscaf	+ 34"
5	José María Jiménez (ESP)	Banesto	+ 38"
6	Luis Pérez Rodríguez (ESP)	ONCE	+ 59"
7	José Manuel Uría (ESP)	Estepona en Marcha–Cafés Toscaf	+ 1' 09"
8	Ramon Garcia (ESP)	Estepona en Marcha–Cafés Toscaf	+ 1' 41"
9	César Solaun (ESP)	Equipo Euskadi	+ 1' 49"
10	Dirk Müller (GER)	Bayer–Worringen	+ 1' 52"
