= 1997 Vuelta a Burgos =

Race details
- Dates: 18–22 August 1997
- Stages: 5
- Distance: 637.1 km (395.9 mi)
- Winning time: 15h 45' 07"

Results
	Winner	Laurent Jalabert (FRA)	(ONCE)
	Second	Abraham Olano (ESP)	(Banesto)
	Third	Fernando Escartín (ESP)	(Kelme–Costa Blanca)

The 1997 Vuelta a Burgos was the 19th edition of the Vuelta a Burgos road cycling stage race, which was held from 18 August to 22 August 1997. The race started and finished in Burgos. The race was won by Laurent Jalabert of the ONCE team.

== General classification ==
Final general classification

Rank	Rider	Team	Time
1	Laurent Jalabert (FRA)	ONCE	15h 45' 07"
2	Abraham Olano (ESP)	Banesto	s.t.
3	Fernando Escartín (ESP)	Kelme–Costa Blanca	+ 1' 30"
4	Íñigo Cuesta (ESP)	ONCE	+ 2' 21"
5	Félix García Casas (ESP)	Festina–Lotus	+ 2' 39"
6	Laurent Dufaux (SUI)	Festina–Lotus	+ 2' 49"
7	Richard Virenque (FRA)	Festina–Lotus	+ 2' 55"
8	Francisco Javier Mauleón (ESP)	ONCE	s.t.
9	Enrico Zaina (ITA)	Asics–CGA	+ 3' 22"
10	Andrey Teteryuk (KAZ)	Lotto–Mobistar–Isoglass	+ 4' 04"
