= César Solaun =

Spanish cyclist

Personal information
- Full name: César Solaun Solana
- Born: December 29, 1970 (age 55) Bilbao, Spain

Cycling career
- Sport: Cycling
- Current team: Retired
- Discipline: Road
- Role: Rider

Professional teams
- 1994–1997: Euskadi–Petronor
- 1998–2001: Banesto
- 2002: Euskaltel–Euskadi

César Solaun Solana (born December 29, 1970, in Bilbao) is a Spanish former professional cyclist.

== Major results ==
1995
1st Stage 2 Vuelta a los Valles Mineros
1996
4th Road race, National Road Championships
5th Overall Volta ao Alentejo
5th Subida al Naranco
1997
2nd Road race, National Road Championships
3rd Clásica de Sabiñánigo
5th Overall Vuelta a los Valles Mineros
5th GP Villafranca de Ordizia
8th Overall Volta a Catalunya
9th Overall Vuelta a Asturias
10th Overall Vuelta a La Rioja
1998
3rd Overall Volta ao Alentejo

1st Stage 3

8th Overall Tour of Galicia
2001
1st Overall Vuelta a La Rioja

1st Stage 2

4th La Flèche Wallonne
8th GP Llodio
2002
4th Clásica a los Puertos

=== Grand Tour general classification results timeline ===
Grand Tour	1994	1995	1996	1997	1998	1999	2000	2001
Giro d'Italia	—	—	—	—	—	—	—	28
Tour de France	—	—	—	—	DNF	39	—	—
Vuelta a España	69	—	38	DNF	—	66	—	—
