= Markus Zberg =

Swiss cyclist

Personal information
- Full name: Markus Zberg
- Born: June 27, 1974 (age 52) Switzerland
- Height: 1.79 m (5 ft 10 1/2 in)
- Weight: 69 kg (152 lb; 10 st 12 lb)

Cycling career
- Sport: Cycling
- Discipline: Road
- Role: Retired
- Rider type: Sprinter

Professional teams
- 1996: Carrera Jeans–Tassoni
- 1997: Mercatone Uno
- 1998: Post Swiss Team
- 1999–2002: Rabobank
- 2003–2008: Gerolsteiner
- 2009: BMC Racing Team

Major wins
- Grand Tours Vuelta a España 2 individual stages (1998) One-day races and Classics National Road Race Championships (2000, 2008) Rund um den Henninger Turm (2001) Milano–Torino (1999)
Medal record
Representing Switzerland
Men's road bicycle racing
World Championships
Silver medal – second place	1999 Verona	Elite Men's Road Race

Markus Zberg (born June 27, 1974, in Altdorf, Uri) is a retired Swiss professional road bicycle racer; he is the younger brother of Beat Zberg. Zberg retired after a severe fall in the Tour de l'Ain. He was the Swiss National Road Race champion in 2000 and 2008.

== Career ==
Zberg became a professional bicycle racer in 1996. After one season each with the Italian teams Carrera and Mercatone Uno–Scanavino and the Post Swiss Team, Zberg joined the Rabobank team in 1999. He took second place at the Road World Championships in Verona in 1999. A year later, he won the title at the Swiss Road Championships. He also won two stages of the 1998 Tour of Spain as well as the one-day races Milan-Turin 1998 and Rund um den Henninger-Turm 2001, stages of the Tour de Suisse, at Tirreno-Adriatico and the Tour of Austria.

== Major results ==
1996
1st Stage 5 Grand Prix Guillaume Tell
1997
1st Stage 7 Tour de Pologne
1998
Vuelta a España

1st Stages 1 & 22

1st Stausee-Rundfahrt Klingnau
1st Stage 3 Tour de Suisse
1st Stage 6 Settimana Ciclistica Lombarda
1999
1st Milano–Torino
2nd Road race, UCI Road World Championships
2nd Overall Paris–Nice
2nd GP Ouest–France
2000
1st Road race, National Road Championships
3rd Amstel Gold Race
2001
1st Rund um den Henninger Turm
1st Stage 3 Tirreno–Adriatico
4th Amstel Gold Race
2002
3rd Milan–San Remo
2003
3rd Tre Valli Varesine
2004
2nd Grand Prix of Aargau Canton
2005
3rd Rund um den Henninger Turm
2006
1st Stage 7 Paris–Nice
2008
1st Road race, National Road Championships
