= José María Jiménez =

Spanish cyclist

Jose María Jiménez
Personal information
- Full name: José María Jiménez Sastre
- Nickname: El Chava (The Guy)
- Born: 6 February 1971 El Barraco, Spain
- Died: 6 December 2003 (aged 32) Madrid, Spain
- Height: 1.83 m (6 ft 0 in)
- Weight: 70 kg (154 lb; 11 st 0 lb)

Cycling career
- Sport: Cycling
- Discipline: Road
- Role: Rider
- Rider type: Climbing specialist

Professional team
- 1993–2002: Banesto

Major wins
- Grand Tours Vuelta a España Points classification (2001) Mountains classification (1997, 1998, 1999, 2001) 9 individual stages (1997, 1998, 1999, 2001) Stage races Volta a Catalunya (2000) One-day races and Classics National Road Race Championships (1997)

Jose María Jiménez Sastre (6 February 1971 – 6 December 2003) was a Spanish professional road bicycle racer. During his career he excelled as a climber, winning numerous mountain stages. His nickname was El Chava.

== Career ==
After a four month spell as a stagiaire (trainee), Jiménez turned professional at the beginning of the 1993 season with the Spanish team Banesto which he would be a part of for the rest of his career. In his first year, his teammates included Tour de France champions Pedro Delgado and Miguel Induráin. Even at an early point in his career, Jiménez was considered a potential successor of Induráin.

=== Vuelta a España ===
Jiménez was particularly successful in the Vuelta a España, winning nine stages in total, the points classification in 2001 and the mountains classification in 1997, 1998, 1999 and 2001. His four triumphs in the mountains classification of the Vuelta places him behind only José Luis Laguía as the rider with the most wins in the competition in the history of the race.

His best year in the Vuelta was 1998. Here, he took the overall lead for the first time in his career after winning stage 6. However, he acknowledged that the individual time trial on stage 9 would inevitably cost him the lead, as this was a weakness of his. As expected, Jiménez found himself just over three minutes down on his Banesto teammate Abraham Olano after the time trial. But Jiménez then won stages 10, 11 and 16, before finally taking back the overall lead from Olano with just two stages remaining. However, the following stage was another time trial in which he lost 2.50 to Olano and consequently the overall victory. Kelme rider Fernando Escartín also bested Jiménez by enough to knock him down into 3rd place overall, his final placing. Jiménez would never again lead the Vuelta. His second best overall performance was in 1999, in which he was 5th. Prior to that he was 12th in 1996 and 21st in 1997. He concluded his Vuelta career with three stage wins on his way to 17th place overall in 2001.

=== Other races ===
Of other noteworthy results, Jiménez won the Spanish National Road Race Championships in 1997 and secured overall victories in the 2000 Volta a Catalunya and in the Vuelta a La Rioja in both 1994 and 1997. He also competed in both of the other Grand Tours, the Tour de France and the Giro d'Italia. After a modest Giro d'Italia debut with 26th place in 1995, he was appointed leader of his Banesto team for the 1999 race and started off well by finishing 2nd after Marco Pantani on stage 8. However, a time trial and then a disastrous stage 14 followed, during which he lost over 20 minutes, making him drop to 38th overall. He eventually finished 33rd overall, never to return to the race.

He had more luck in his Tour de France starts, finishing 8th overall in 1997 after a consistent performance which included four top 10 results on individual stages. He also challenged for stage wins in the 2000 edition, managing 3rd on the mountainous stage 10 and 2nd on stage 15, only beaten by Marco Pantani. Nonetheless, he finished 23rd overall, some 52 minutes down on winner Lance Armstrong.

=== Style ===
Both on and off the bike, Jiménez was, with only a few exceptions, too erratic to ride consistently in stage races.

"He was a rider in the old style. When things went well, they went very well. When things didn't go well, they didn't go at all. He lost a lot due to reasons beyond his work, leaving cycling like that... all of the sudden."

— Miguel Induráin

He often attacked without considering the consequences, which however sometimes resulted in spectacular wins in the toughest mountain stages. A particularly memorable instance of this occurred during stage eight of the 1999 Vuelta a España. Jiménez attacked the 23% gradient of the Angliru in rain and fog to catch Pavel Tonkov's long solo break at the line and take the stage in a two-man sprint. As he crossed the line, he did not have the energy for the victory pose. It was the first time in the history of the race that the Angliru was used. However, he would subsequently pay for his attacking style in the next stage, where he would often lose by 10 or more minutes.

== Death ==
Jiménez received psychological treatment for depression, and retired from professional cycling in 2002, at which point he got married. He died of a heart attack in a psychiatric hospital in Madrid at the age of 32, in December 2003.

Spanish cyclist Carlos Sastre is Jiménez's brother-in-law. He dedicated his victory in the 2008 Tour de France to Jiménez.

== Career achievements ==
=== Major results ===
1992
1st Overall Circuito Montañés
1993
3rd Subida al Naranco
5th Subida a Urkiola
1994
1st Overall Vuelta a La Rioja

1st Stage 2a

1st Subida a Urkiola
3rd Prueba Villafranca de Ordizia
10th Subida al Naranco
1995
1st Overall Colorado Classic

1st Stages 1 & 3

2nd Overall Vuelta a La Rioja
2nd Road race, National Road Championships
9th Subida al Naranco
10th Overall Tour of the Basque Country
10th Overall Volta a Catalunya

1st Stage 4

1996
1st Subida a Urkiola
1st Mountains classification Vuelta a Burgos
9th Overall Setmana Catalana de Ciclisme
1997
1st National Road Race Championship
1st Overall Vuelta a La Rioja

1st Stage 2

Vuelta a España

1st Mountains classification
1st Stage 19

2nd Subida al Naranco
2nd Subida a Urkiola
3rd Classique des Alpes
5th Overall Vuelta a Asturias
8th Overall Tour de France
1998
2nd Overall Vuelta a Asturias

1st Stage 5

3rd Overall Vuelta a España

1st Mountains classification
1st Stages 6, 10, 11 & 16

5th Overall Critérium du Dauphiné Libéré

1st Mountains classification
1st Combination classification
1st Stage 3

7th Overall Vuelta a Burgos

1st Mountains classification

9th Overall Route d'Occitanie
1999
2nd Overall Vuelta a Aragón
3rd Overall Volta a Catalunya
3rd Subida a Urkiola
5th Overall Vuelta a España

1st Mountains classification
1st Stage 8

8th Overall Vuelta a Burgos
2000
1st Overall Volta a Catalunya

1st Stages 7 & 8 (ITT)

1st Classique des Alpes
2001
Vuelta a España

1st Points classification
1st Mountains classification
1st Stages 8, 11 & 12 (ITT)

2nd Subida a Urkiola
3rd Overall Vuelta a La Rioja

=== Grand Tour general classification results timeline ===
Grand Tour	1995	1996	1997	1998	1999	2000	2001
Giro d'Italia	26	—	—	—	33	—	—
Tour de France	51	57	8	DNF	—	23	—
Vuelta a España	—	12	21	3	5	DNF	17

Legend
—	Did not compete
DNF	Did not finish
