= Andrea Brognara =

Italian cyclist

Personal information
- Born: 26 May 1971 (age 55) Isola della Scala, Italy

Cycling career
- Sport: Cycling
- Discipline: Road
- Role: Rider

Professional teams
- 1996–1997: Gewiss Playbus
- 1998: Riso Scotti–MG Maglificio
- 1999: Cantina Tollo–Alexia Alluminio
- 2000–2001: Alexia Alluminio
- 2002–2003: Alessio

Andrea Brognara (born 26 May 1971) is an Italian cyclist, who competed as a professional from 1996 to 2003.

== Major results ==
2001
7th Giro di Campania
2002
5th Trofeo Città di Castelfidardo

=== Grand Tour general classification results timeline ===
| Grand Tour | 1996 | 1997 | 1998 | 1999 | 2000 | 2001 | 2002 | 2003 |
|---|---|---|---|---|---|---|---|---|
| Giro d'Italia | 93 | DNF | 86 | 110 | — | 131 | — | — |
| Tour de France | — | DNF | — | — | — | — | 119 | — |
| Vuelta a España | 110 | — | — | — | — | — | DNF | DNF |

Legend
| — | Did not compete |
| DNF | Did not finish |
