= Giancarlo Raimondi =

Italian cyclist

Personal information
- Born: 28 November 1972 (age 53) Milan, Italy

Cycling career
- Sport: Cycling
- Current team: Retired
- Discipline: Road
- Role: Rider

Professional team
- 1997–2001: Brescialat–Oyster

Giancarlo Raimondi (born 28 November 1972 in Milan) is an Italian former cyclist. He rode in one Giro d'Italia and four editions of the Vuelta a España.

== Major results ==
1997
1st Stage 3 Vuelta a Asturias
1998
1st Stage 1 Volta a Portugal
3rd Giro del Friuli
1st Sprints Classification Vuelta a España
1999
1st Coppa Bernocchi
2000
1st Stage 2 Volta a Portugal
1st Stage 4 Four Days of Dunkirk
