= Carlo Marino Bianchi =

Italian cyclist

Personal information
- Born: 12 June 1970 (age 56)

Cycling career
- Sport: Cycling
- Role: Rider

Carlo Marino Bianchi (born 12 June 1970) is an Italian racing cyclist. He rode in the 1998 Tour de France.
