= Gianluca Valoti =

Italian cyclist

Personal information
- Born: 16 February 1973 (age 53) Alzano Lombardo, Italy
- Height: 1.70 m (5 ft 7 in)
- Weight: 54 kg (119 lb; 8 st 7 lb)

Cycling career
- Sport: Cycling
- Current team: MBH Bank CSB Telecom Fort
- Discipline: Road
- Role: Rider (retired); Directeur sportif

Amateur teams
- 1995: Polti–Granarolo–Santini (stagiaire)
- 1996: Team Polti (stagiaire)

Professional teams
- 1997–1999: Team Polti
- 2000: Team Colpack
- 2001–2002: Alexia Alluminio

Managerial team
- 2011–: Team Colpack

Gianluca Valoti (born 16 February 1973) is an Italian former professional road racing cyclist, who currently works as a directeur sportif for UCI Continental team MBH Bank CSB Telecom Fort.

== Major results ==
1996
1st GP Capodarco
2nd GP Industria Artigianato e Commercio Carnaghese
2nd Giro d'Oro
5th Coppa Placci
10th Giro dell'Emilia
1997
5th Trofeo dello Scalatore
1998
9th Trofeo dello Scalatore
1999
4th Subida a Urkiola
8th Gran Premio Città di Camaiore
2000
7th Tre Valli Varesine
9th Trofeo dello Scalatore
2001
10th Giro dell'Emilia
10th Gran Premio Città di Camaiore
2002
3rd Overall Brixia Tour

=== Grand Tour general classification results timeline ===
| Grand Tour | 1997 | 1998 | 1999 | 2000 | 2001 |
|---|---|---|---|---|---|
| Giro d'Italia | — | DNF | — | — | 51 |
| Tour de France | 86 | — | — | — | — |
| Vuelta a España | — | 46 | — | — | — |

Legend
| — | Did not compete |
| DNF | Did not finish |
