= 1999 Giro d'Italia =

Race details
- Dates: 15 May — 6 June 1999
- Stages: 22
- Distance: 3,757 km (2,334 mi)
- Winning time: 99h 55' 56"

Results
Jersey awarded to the overall winner	Winner	Ivan Gotti (ITA)	(Team Polti)
	Second	Paolo Savoldelli (ITA)	(Saeco–Cannondale)
	Third	Gilberto Simoni (ITA)	(Ballan–Alessio)
Jersey awarded to the points classification winner	Points	Laurent Jalabert (FRA)	(ONCE–Deutsche Bank)
Jersey awarded to the mountains classification winner	Mountains	Chepe González (COL)	(Team Polti)
Jersey awarded to the intergiro classification winner	Intergiro	Fabrizio Guidi (ITA)	(Team Polti)
	Team	Vitalicio Seguros	
	Team points	Team Polti	

The 1999 Giro d'Italia was the 82nd edition of the Giro. It began on 15 May with a mass-start stage that stretched from Agrigento to Modica. The race came to a close on 6 June with a mass-start stage that ended in the Italian city of Milan. Eighteen teams entered the race that was won by the Italian Ivan Gotti (sub judice)of the Team Polti team. Second and third were the Italians riders Paolo Savoldelli and Gilberto Simoni. Marco Pantani is credited with four high mountain stage victories.

Late in the race Marco Pantani was accused of using EPO and was expelled either as the result of a failed doping control, or due to a conspiracy involving drug tests being manipulated.

In the race's other classifications, Kelme–Costa Blanca rider Chepe González won the mountains classification, Laurent Jalabert of the ONCE–Deutsche Bank team won the points classification, and Team Polti rider Fabrizio Guidi won the intergiro classification. Vitalicio Seguros finished as the winners of the Trofeo Fast Team classification, ranking each of the eighteen teams contesting the race by lowest cumulative time. The other team classification, the Trofeo Super Team classification, where the teams' riders are awarded points for placing within the top twenty in each stage and the points are then totaled for each team was won by Team Polti.

== Teams ==
A total of 18 teams were invited to participate in the 1999 Giro d'Italia. Each team sent a squad of nine riders, so the Giro began with a peloton of 162 cyclists. Out of the 162 riders that started this edition of the Giro d'Italia, a total of 116 riders made it to the finish in Milan.

The 18 teams that took part in the race were:

- Amica Chips–Costa de Almería
- Ballan–Alessio
- Banesto
- Cantina Tollo–Alexia Alluminio
- Kelme–Costa Blanca
- Lampre–Daikin
- Liquigas–Pata
- Mapei–Quick-Step
- Mercatone Uno–Bianchi
- Mobilvetta Design–Northwave
- Navigare–Gaerne
- ONCE–Deutsche Bank
- Riso Scotti–Vinavil
- Saeco–Cannondale
- Team Polti
- TVM–Farm Frites
- Vini Caldirola
- Vitalicio Seguros

== Route and stages ==
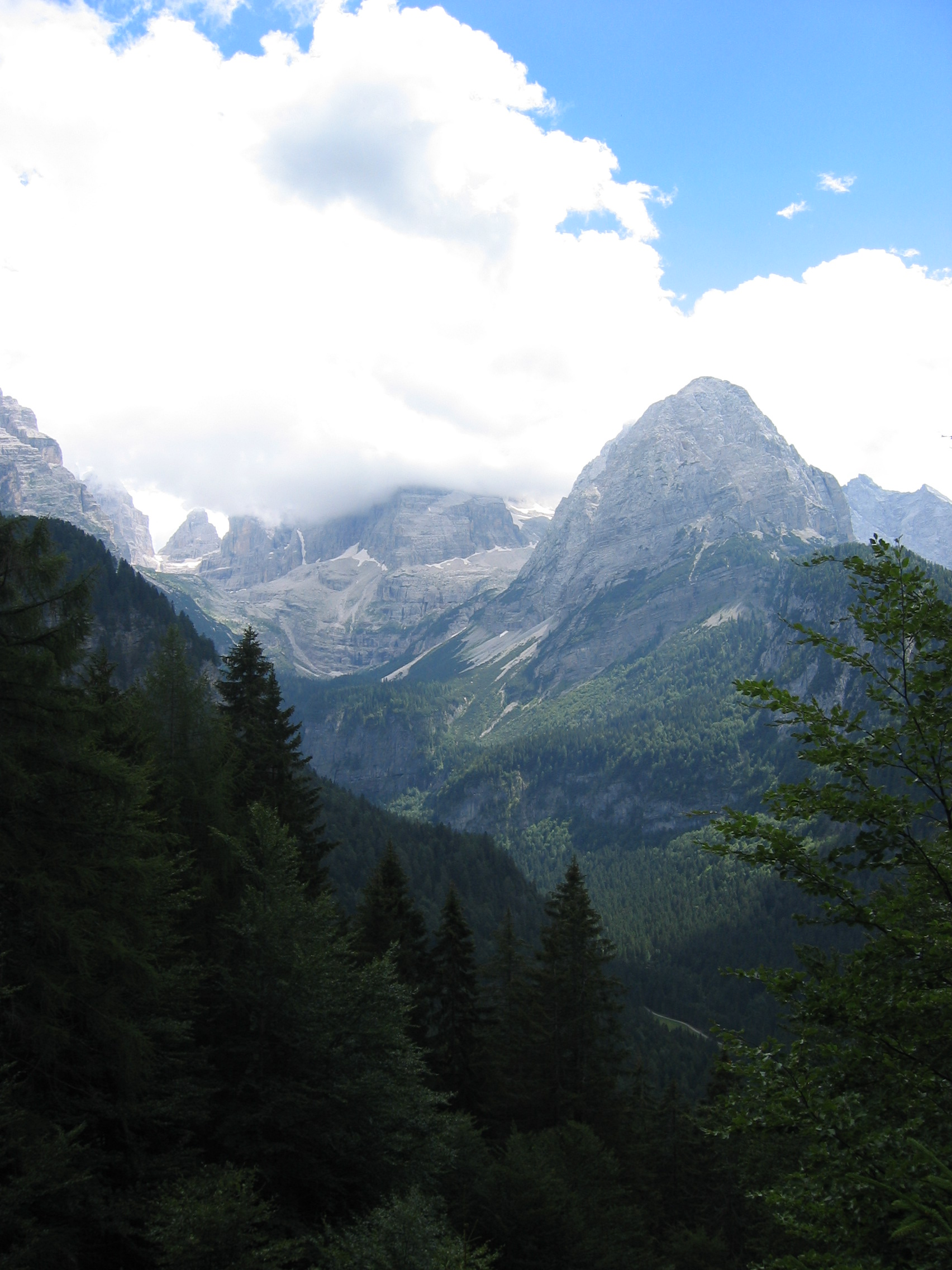
Madonna di Campiglio hosted the finish of the 175 km (109 mi) twentieth stage.

The route for the 1999 Giro d'Italia was unveiled by race director Carmine Castellano on 14 November 1998 in Milan. It contained four time trial events, there of which were individual and one a team event. There were eleven stages containing high mountains, of which five had summit finishes: stage 5, to Massiccio del Sirino; stage 8, to Gran Sasso d'Italia; stage 15, to Santuario di Oropa; stage 19, to Alpe di Pampeago; and stage 20, to Madonna di Campiglio. The organizers chose to include one rest day. When compared to the previous year's race, the race was 73 km (45 mi) shorter, contained the one more rest day, as well as one more time trial event.

Stage characteristics and winners
Stage	Date	Course	Distance	Type	Winner
1	15 May	Agrigento to Modica	175 km (109 mi)	Plain stage	Ivan Quaranta (ITA)
2	16 May	Noto to Catania	133 km (83 mi)	Plain stage	Mario Cipollini (ITA)
3	17 May	Catania to Messina	176 km (109 mi)	Plain stage	Jeroen Blijlevens (NED)
4	18 May	Vibo Valentia to Terme Luigiane	186 km (116 mi)	Stage with mountain(s)	Laurent Jalabert (FRA)
5	19 May	Terme Luigiane to Massiccio del Sirino	144 km (89 mi)	Stage with mountain(s)	José Jaime González (COL)
6	20 May	Lauria to Foggia	257 km (160 mi)	Plain stage	Romāns Vainšteins (LAT)
7	21 May	Foggia to Lanciano	153 km (95 mi)	Plain stage	Jeroen Blijlevens (NED)
8	22 May	Pescara to Gran Sasso d'Italia	253 km (157 mi)	Stage with mountain(s)	Marco Pantani (ITA)
9	23 May	Ancona to Ancona	32 km (20 mi)	Individual time trial	Laurent Jalabert (FRA)
10	24 May	Ancona to Sansepolcro	189 km (117 mi)	Stage with mountain(s)	Mario Cipollini (ITA)
11	25 May	Sansepolcro to Cesenatico	125 km (78 mi)	Plain stage	Ivan Quaranta (ITA)
12	26 May	Cesenatico to Sassuolo	168 km (104 mi)	Plain stage	Mario Cipollini (ITA)
13	27 May	Sassuolo to Rapallo	243 km (151 mi)	Stage with mountain(s)	Richard Virenque (FRA)
	28 May	Rest day			
14	29 May	Bra to Borgo San Dalmazzo	187 km (116 mi)	Stage with mountain(s)	Paolo Savoldelli (ITA)
15	30 May	Racconigi to Santuario di Oropa	160 km (99 mi)	Stage with mountain(s)	Marco Pantani (ITA)
16	31 May	Biella to Lumezzane	232 km (144 mi)	Plain stage	Laurent Jalabert (FRA)
17	1 June	Lumezzane to Castelfranco Veneto	215 km (134 mi)	Plain stage	Mario Cipollini (ITA)
18	2 June	Treviso to Treviso	45 km (28 mi)	Individual time trial	Serhiy Honchar (UKR)
19	3 June	Castelfranco Veneto to Alpe di Pampeago	166 km (103 mi)	Stage with mountain(s)	Marco Pantani (ITA)
20	4 June	Predazzo to Madonna di Campiglio	175 km (109 mi)	Stage with mountain(s)	Marco Pantani (ITA)
21	5 June	Madonna di Campiglio to Aprica	190 km (118 mi)	Stage with mountain(s)	Roberto Heras (ESP)
22	6 June	Darfo Boario Terme to Milan	170 km (106 mi)	Plain stage	Fabrizio Guidi (ITA)
	Total		3,757 km (2,334 mi)		

== Race overview ==
Defending champion Marco Pantani, leading the general classification in Madonna di Campiglio (20th stage), was disqualified for an excessive hematocrit level before stage 21. The entire Mercatone Uno–Bianchi (Pantani's team) withdrew from the Giro. This left the race open for Gotti to capture his second overall title and wear the final pink jersey as Giro Champion for the 2nd time in three years.

== Classification leadership ==
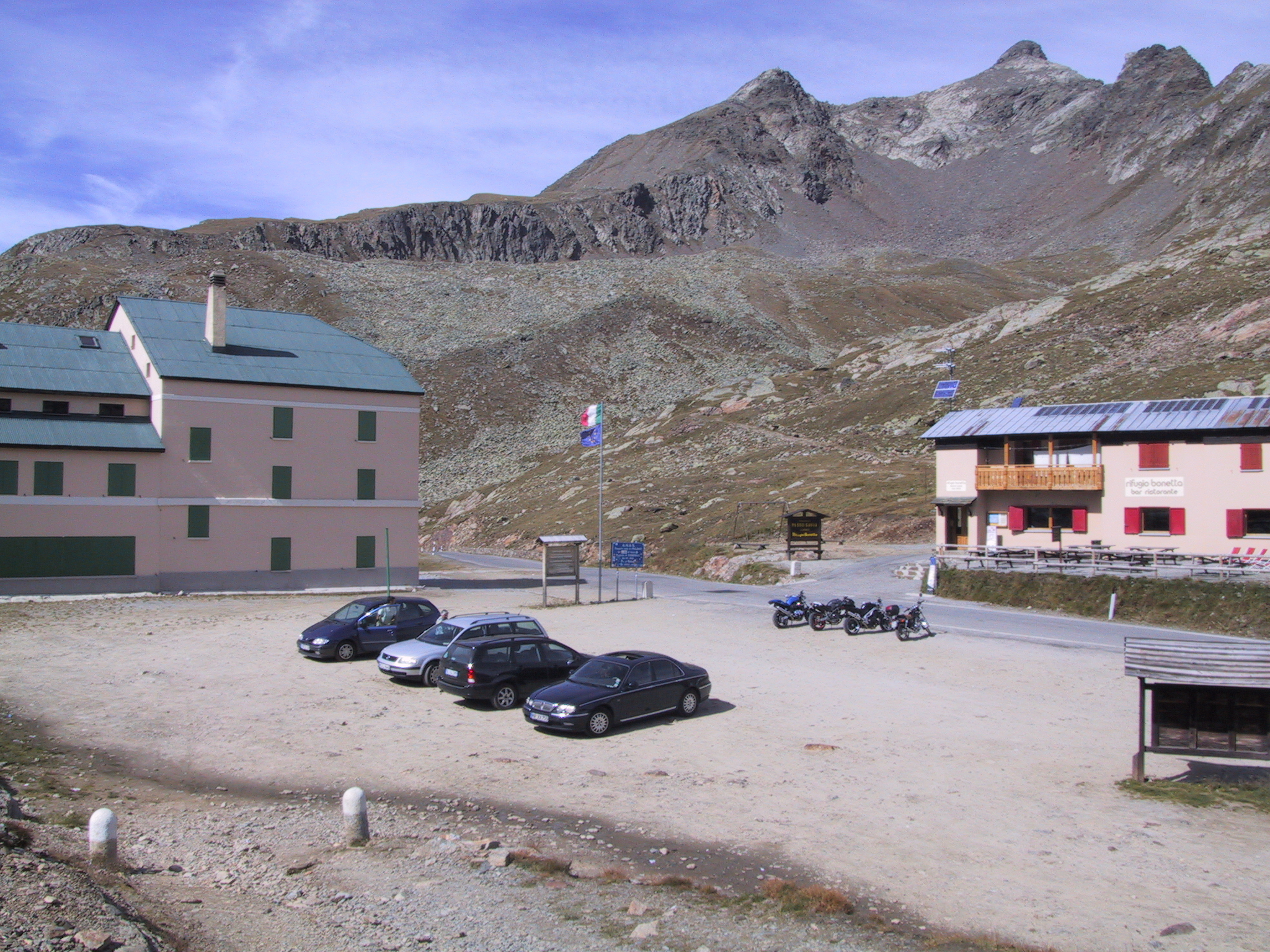
The Passo di Gavia was the Cima Coppi for the 1999 edition of the Giro.

Four different jerseys were worn during the 1999 Giro d'Italia. The leader of the general classification – calculated by adding the stage finish times of each rider, and allowing time bonuses for the first three finishers on mass-start stages – wore a pink jersey. This classification is the most important of the race, and its winner is considered as the winner of the Giro.

For the points classification, which awarded a purple (or cyclamen) jersey to its leader, cyclists were given points for finishing a stage in the top 15; additional points could also be won in intermediate sprints. The green jersey was awarded to the mountains classification leader. In this ranking, points were won by reaching the summit of a climb ahead of other cyclists. Each climb was ranked as either first, second or third category, with more points available for higher category climbs. The Cima Coppi, the race's highest point of elevation, awarded more points than the other first category climbs. The intergiro classification was marked by a blue jersey. The calculation for the intergiro is similar to that of the general classification, in each stage there is a midway point that the riders pass through a point and where their time is stopped. As the race goes on, their times compiled and the person with the lowest time is the leader of the intergiro classification and wears the blue jersey. Although no jersey was awarded, there was also one classification for the teams, in which the stage finish times of the best three cyclists per team were added; the leading team was the one with the lowest total time.

The rows in the following table correspond to the jerseys awarded after that stage was run.

Stage	Winner	General classification	Points classification	Mountains classification	Intergiro classification	Trofeo Fast Team
1	Ivan Quaranta	Ivan Quaranta	Ivan Quaranta	Paolo Bettini	?	Mercatone Uno–Bianchi
2	Mario Cipollini	Mario Cipollini	Ivan Quaranta	Paolo Bettini	?	Saeco–Cannondale
3	Jeroen Blijlevens	Jeroen Blijlevens	Ivan Quaranta	Paolo Bettini	?	Navigare–Gaerne
4	Laurent Jalabert	Jeroen Blijlevens	Ivan Quaranta	Paolo Bettini	?	Saeco–Cannondale
5	José Jaime González	Laurent Jalabert	Ivan Quaranta	Paolo Bettini	?	Saeco–Cannondale
6	Romāns Vainšteins	Laurent Jalabert	Ivan Quaranta	Paolo Bettini	?	Team Polti
7	Jeroen Blijlevens	Laurent Jalabert	Ivan Quaranta	Paolo Bettini	?	Team Polti
8	Marco Pantani	Marco Pantani	Ivan Quaranta	Paolo Bettini	?	Banesto
9	Laurent Jalabert	Laurent Jalabert	Ivan Quaranta	Paolo Bettini	?	Banesto
10	Mario Cipollini	Laurent Jalabert	Ivan Quaranta	Paolo Bettini	?	Banesto
11	Ivan Quaranta	Laurent Jalabert	Ivan Quaranta	Paolo Bettini	?	Banesto
12	Mario Cipollini	Laurent Jalabert	Ivan Quaranta	Paolo Bettini	?	Banesto
13	Richard Virenque	Laurent Jalabert	Ivan Quaranta	Chepe González	?	Banesto
14	Paolo Savoldelli	Marco Pantani	Ivan Quaranta	Chepe González	?	Banesto
15	Marco Pantani	Marco Pantani	Ivan Quaranta	Marco Pantani	?	Vitalicio Seguros
16	Laurent Jalabert	Marco Pantani	Ivan Quaranta	Marco Pantani	?	Vitalicio Seguros
17	Mario Cipollini	Marco Pantani	Ivan Quaranta	Marco Pantani	?	Vitalicio Seguros
18	Serhiy Honchar	Marco Pantani	Ivan Quaranta	Marco Pantani	?	Vitalicio Seguros
19	Marco Pantani	Marco Pantani	Marco Pantani	Marco Pantani	?	Vitalicio Seguros
20	Marco Pantani	Marco Pantani	Marco Pantani	Marco Pantani	?	Vitalicio Seguros
21	Roberto Heras	Ivan Gotti	Laurent Jalabert	Marco Pantani	?	Vitalicio Seguros
22	Fabrizio Guidi	Ivan Gotti	Laurent Jalabert	Chepe González	?	Vitalicio Seguros
Final		Ivan Gotti	Laurent Jalabert	Chepe González	Fabrizio Guidi	Vitalicio Seguros

== Final standings ==
Legend
Pink jersey	Denotes the winner of the General classification	Green jersey	Denotes the winner of the Mountains classification
Purple jersey	Denotes the winner of the Points classification	Blue jersey	Denotes the winner of the Intergiro classification

=== General classification ===
	Rider	Team	Time
1	Ivan Gotti (ITA)	Team Polti	99h 55' 56"
2	Paolo Savoldelli (ITA)	Saeco–Cannondale	+ 3' 35"
3	Gilberto Simoni (ITA)	Ballan–Alessio	+ 3' 36"
4	Laurent Jalabert (FRA)	ONCE–Deutsche Bank	+ 5' 16"
5	Roberto Heras (ESP)	Kelme–Costa Blanca	+ 7' 47"
6	Niklas Axelsson (SWE)	Navigare–Gaerne	+ 9' 38"
7	Serhiy Honchar (UKR)	Vini Caldirola	+ 12' 07"
8	Daniele De Paoli (ITA)	Amica Chips–Costa de Almería	+ 14' 20"
9	Daniel Clavero (ESP)	Vitalicio Seguros	+ 15' 53"
10	Roberto Sgambelluri (ITA)	Cantina Tollo-Alexia Alluminio Italia	+ 17' 31"

=== Points classification ===
	Rider	Team	Points
1	Laurent Jalabert (FRA)	ONCE–Deutsche Bank	175
2	Fabrizio Guidi (ITA)	Team Polti	170
3	Massimo Strazzer (ITA)	Mobilvetta Design–Northwave	126
4	Paolo Savoldelli (ITA)	Saeco–Cannondale	117
5	Ivan Gotti (ITA)	Team Polti	110
6	Gian Matteo Fagnini (ITA)	Saeco–Cannondale	96
7	Gilberto Simoni (ITA)	Ballan–Alessio	94
8	Matteo Tosatto (ITA)	Ballan–Alessio	88
9	Serhiy Honchar (UKR)	Vini Caldirola	87
10	Oscar Camenzind (SUI)	Lampre–Daikin	82

=== Mountains classification ===
	Rider	Team	Points
1	Chepe González (COL)	Team Polti	61
2	Mariano Piccoli (ITA)	Lampre–Daikin	45
3	Paolo Bettini (ITA)	Mapei–Quick-Step	44
4	Ivan Gotti (ITA)	Team Polti	33
5	Gilberto Simoni (ITA)	Ballan–Alessio	33
6	Roberto Heras (ESP)	Kelme–Costa Blanca	26
7	Laurent Jalabert (FRA)	ONCE–Deutsche Bank	25
8	Hernán Buenahora (COL)	Vitalicio Seguros	18
9	Gabriele Missaglia (ITA)	Lampre–Daikin	14
10	Richard Virenque (FRA)	Team Polti	13

=== Intergiro classification ===
	Rider	Team	Time
1	Fabrizio Guidi (ITA)	Team Polti	58h 47' 30"
2	Massimo Strazzer (ITA)	Mobilvetta Design–Northwave	+ 2"
3	Gian Matteo Fagnini (ITA)	Saeco–Cannondale	+ 24"
4	Biagio Conte (ITA)	Liquigas	2' 02"
5	Matteo Tosatto (ITA)	Ballan–Alessio	+ 2' 13"

=== Trofeo Fast Team classification ===
	Team	Time
1	Vitalicio Seguros	300h 39' 35"
2	Kelme–Costa Blanca	+ 22' 11"
3	Team Polti	+ 22' 45"
4	Lampre–Daikin	+ 29' 16"
5	ONCE–Deutsche Bank	+ 58' 57"
6	Amica Chips–Costa de Almería	+ 1h 15' 16"
7	Liquigas–Pata	+ 1h 15' 18"
8	Navigare–Gaerne	+ 1h 47' 23"
9	Cantina Tollo-Alexia Alluminio Italia	+ 1h 56' 17"
10	Saeco–Cannondale	+ 1h 59' 41"

=== Trofeo Super Team classification ===
	Team	Points
1	Team Polti	1243
2	Saeco–Cannondale	1136
3	ONCE–Deutsche Bank	1034
4	Ballan–Alessio	676
5	Kelme–Costa Blanca	663
