= Cristiano Frattini =

Italian cyclist

Personal information
- Born: 17 April 1973 (age 53)

Cycling career
- Sport: Cycling
- Role: Rider

Cristiano Frattini (born 17 April 1973) is an Italian racing cyclist. He rode in the 1996 Tour de France.
