= Fernando Escartín =

Spanish cyclist

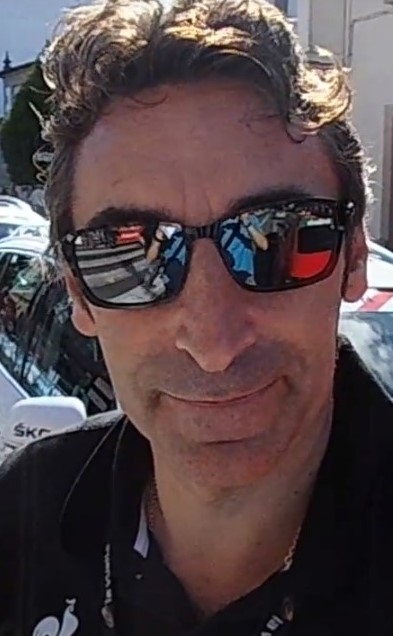
- Escartín in 2014

Personal information
- Full name: Fernando Escartín Coti
- Born: 24 January 1968 (age 58) Biescas, Spain
- Height: 1.74 m (5 ft 9 in)
- Weight: 64 kg (141 lb)

Cycling career
- Sport: Cycling
- Discipline: Road
- Role: Rider

Professional teams
- 1990–1993: CLAS–Cajastur
- 1994–1995: Mapei–CLAS
- 1996–2000: Kelme–Artiach
- 2001–2002: Team Coast–Buffalo

Major wins
- Grand Tours Tour de France 1 individual stage (1999) Stage races Volta a Catalunya (1997)

Fernando Escartín Coti (born 24 January 1968) is a Spanish former road racing cyclist. Between 1995 and 2000 he came in the top 10 of the Tour de France five times and in that same time period finished on the podium in 2nd place at the Vuelta a España, twice.

== Biography ==
Escartín was born in Biescas, Aragon.

=== Tour de France ===
Escartín placed fifth in the 1997 Tour de France, riding as the leader of the Kelme team. He had been lying fourth prior to a long time trial on the penultimate day in Disneyland, finishing the stage five minutes behind stage winner and compatriot Abraham Olano, who overtook him in the overall standings as the top-finishing Spaniard.

Escartín won a stage and finished third overall in the 1999 Tour de France. Of the cyclists who finished on the podium in the era in which Lance Armstrong won the Tour de France seven times (1999–2005), Escartín is the sole rider not to be implicated in a doping scandal. In response to the Armstrong doping scandal, Escartín stated, "Lance Armstrong remains the 1999 Tour winner, second Zulle and third, me... It's 13 years now since this all happened. It seems completely illogical and unreal. I don't want to even think about it."

Escartín was, however, one of the names involved with the Giardini Margherita Raid where prescriptions for banned substances were found, handwritten by sports doctors.

=== Retirement ===
Escartín rode his last race at a criterium in Llobregat on 4 November 2002, before retiring from professional cycling.

He has worked as a race co-designer for the Vuelta a España since retirement.

== Career achievements ==
=== Major results ===
1993
1st Gran Premio de Náquera
1st Stage 5 Tour of Galicia
2nd Trofeo Luis Ocaña
3rd Overall Tour de Suisse
3rd Road race, National Road Championships
3rd Klasika Primavera
9th Overall Critérium International
10th Overall Vuelta a España
1994
1st Clásica a los Puertos de Guadarrama
2nd Overall Volta a Catalunya
7th Subida al Naranco
8th Overall Tour of the Basque Country
9th Overall Vuelta a España
1995
1st Overall Vuelta a Aragón

1st Stage 3

1st Overall Vuelta a los Valles Mineros

1st Stage 1

1st Clásica de Sabiñánigo
2nd Subida al Naranco
3rd Klasika Primavera
6th Overall Tour of the Basque Country
6th Overall Critérium International
7th Overall Tour de France
10th Overall Tour de Suisse
1996
1st Clásica a los Puertos de Guadarrama
2nd Overall Vuelta a Asturias
3rd Road race, National Road Championships
6th Overall Critérium du Dauphiné Libéré
6th Overall Euskal Bizikleta
7th Subida al Naranco
8th Overall Tour de France
10th Overall Vuelta a España
1997
1st Overall Volta a Catalunya

1st Stage 6

2nd Overall Vuelta a España
3rd Overall Vuelta a Asturias

1st Stage 2

3rd Overall Vuelta a Burgos
5th Overall Tour de France
6th Overall Vuelta a Aragón
9th Overall Escalada a Montjuïc
10th Grand Prix Navarre
1998
1st Stage 1 Vuelta a Aragón
2nd Overall Vuelta a España
3rd Overall Volta a Catalunya

1st Stage 8

4th Overall Vuelta a Burgos
5th Overall Vuelta a Castilla y León
8th Overall Euskal Bizikleta
9th Overall Vuelta a Asturias
1999
3rd Overall Tour de France

1st Stage 15

3rd Overall Vuelta a Asturias

1st Stages 4 & 5

4th Overall Euskal Bizikleta

1st Stages 3 & 5

7th Overall Volta a Catalunya
2000
2nd Clásica a los Puertos de Guadarrama
4th Overall Tour of Galicia
7th Overall Vuelta a España
10th Overall Vuelta a Burgos
7th Overall Volta a Catalunya
8th Overall Tour de France
9th Overall Vuelta a Aragón
10th Overall Euskal Bizikleta
2001
3rd Overall Volta a Catalunya
3rd Züri-Metzgete
10th Overall Vuelta a España
2002
4th GP Miguel Induráin
5th Overall Volta a Catalunya
8th Overall Giro d'Italia

=== Grand Tour general classification results timeline ===
Grand Tour	1992	1993	1994	1995	1996	1997	1998	1999	2000	2001	2002
Giro d'Italia	—	—	—	—	—	—	—	—	—	—	8
Tour de France	45	30	12	7	8	5	DNF	3	8	—	—
Vuelta a España	—	10	9	—	10	2	2	DNF	7	10	DNF

DNF=Did not finish
