= Marco Della Vedova =

Italian cyclist

Personal information
- Born: 27 June 1972 (age 54) Premosello-Chiovenda

Cycling career
- Sport: Cycling
- Role: Rider

Marco Della Vedova (born 27 June 1972) is an Italian racing cyclist. He rode in the 1996 Tour de France.
