= Fabrice Gougot =

French cyclist

Personal information
- Born: 31 August 1971 (age 55)

Cycling career
- Sport: Cycling
- Role: Rider

Fabrice Gougot (born 31 August 1971) is a French racing cyclist. He rode in the 1999 Tour de France.
