= Post Swiss Team =

Team information
- UCI code: POS
- Registered: Switzerland
- Founded: 1996
- Disbanded: 2001
- Discipline: Road
- Status: GSII

Key personnel
- Team managers: Jacques Michaud; Serge Demierre; Jean-Jacques Loup

Team name history
- 1996 1997–2001: PMU Romand–Bepsa; Post Swiss Team

Post Swiss Team (UCI team code: POS) was a Swiss cycling team that existed from 1996 to 2001. The team was known as PMU Romand–Bepsa in 1996.
