= Andrei Zintchenko =

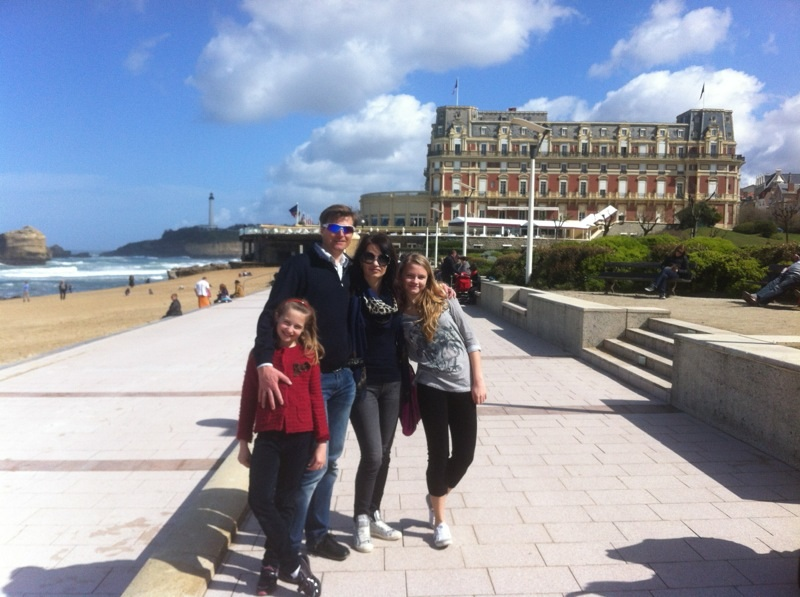

Personal information
- Full name: Andrei Zintchenko; Андрей Зинченко
- Born: 5 January 1972 (age 54) Samara, Soviet Union

Cycling career
- Sport: Cycling
- Discipline: Road
- Role: Rider

Professional teams
- 1994–1996: Porcelana Santa Clara
- 1997: Estepona en Marcha
- 1998–1999: Vitalicio Seguros-Grupo Generali
- 2000–2003: LA-Pecol
- 2004–2005: Milaneza Maia
- 2006: Riberalves-Alcobaça

Major wins
- 4 stages, Vuelta a España

Andrei Zintchenko (Russian: Андрей Зинченко; born 5 January 1972 in Samara) is a Russian former professional road bicycle racer active between the years 1994 and 2006. In his career, he won four stages in the Vuelta a España.

== Palmarès ==
1995
2nd, Russia National Road Championships, Road Race
1998
Vuelta a España

1st, Stage 13
1st, Stage 15
1st, Stage 20

1999
1st, Escalada a Montjuïc
2000
1st, Stage 14, Vuelta a España
3rd, Overall, Volta ao Algarve
3rd, Overall, Volta a Portugal
2001
3rd, Russia National Road Championships, Individual Time Trial
3rd, Overall, Volta ao Alentejo
2nd, Overall, Volta a Portugal

1st, Stage 6

2002
1st, Stage 2, Vuelta a Asturias
2003
1st, Overall, Volta ao Alentejo

1st, Stage 2

2006
1st, Stage 4b, Vuelta Internacional a Extremadura
