= Fabrizio Guidi =

Italian cyclist

Personal information
- Full name: Fabrizio Guidi
- Born: 13 April 1972 (age 54) Pontedera, Italy
- Height: 1.87 m (6 ft 2 in)
- Weight: 73 kg (161 lb)

Cycling career
- Sport: Cycling
- Current team: UAE Team Emirates XRG
- Discipline: Road
- Role: Rider; Directeur sportif
- Rider type: Sprinter

Amateur team
- 1994: US Magniarredo

Professional teams
- 1995–1997: Navigare–Blue Storm
- 1998–1999: Team Polti
- 2000: Française des Jeux
- 2001: Mercury–Viatel
- 2002–2003: Team Coast
- 2004–2005: Team CSC
- 2005–2006: Phonak
- 2007: Barloworld

Managerial teams
- 2008: Nippo–Endeka
- 2011–2014: Saxo Bank–SunGard
- 2015–2020: Cannondale–Garmin
- 2021–: UAE Team Emirates

Major wins
- Grand Tours Giro d'Italia Points classification (1996) Intergiro classification (1996, 1999, 2000) 2 stages (1999, 2000) Vuelta a España Points classification (1998) 3 stages (1998) Stage races Danmark Rundt (1996) Tour de Wallonie (2006) One-day races and Classics Tre Valli Varesine (1996)

Fabrizio Guidi (born 13 April 1972 in Pontedera, Province of Pisa) is an Italian former road bicycle racer. Guidi won over 40 races since he turned professional in 1995, including two stages in Giro d'Italia and three stages of 1998 Vuelta a España. He also won the Intergiro competition of Giro d'Italia in 1996, 1999 and 2000. He retired at the end of 2007 season, riding for the British team Barloworld. He now works as a directeur sportif for UCI WorldTeam UAE Team Emirates XRG.

== Major results ==
1995
1st Overall Tour du Vaucluse
1st Stage 8 Volta a Portugal
2nd Overall Tour de Pologne
9th Firenze–Pistoia
10th Overall Hofbrau Cup
1996
Giro d'Italia

1st Points classification
1st Intergiro classification

1st Overall Danmark Rundt

1st Points classification
1st Stage 3

1st Overall Giro di Puglia

1st Stage 2

1st Overall Tour du Vaucluse

1st Stages 1, 3 & 5

1st Gran Premio della Costa Etruschi
1st Grand Prix of Aargau Canton
1st Tre Valli Varesine
1st Giro delle Valli Aretine
1st Gran Premio Città di Rio Saliceto e Correggio
4th Coppa Bernocchi
4th Giro dell'Etna
6th Giro del Lazio
6th Gran Premio della Liberazione
6th Trofeo Pantalica
9th Giro del Veneto
1997
1st Giro delle Valli Aretine
1st Stages 2 & 4 Volta a Portugal
1st Stage 4a Euskal Bizikleta
2nd Giro d'Oro
3rd Gran Premio della Costa Etruschi
4th Classic Haribo
8th Gent–Wevelgem
8th Trofeo Laigueglia
9th Overall Three Days of De Panne

1st Stage 3a

1998
Vuelta a España

1st Points classification
1st Stages 4, 8 & 18

1st Stage 6 Four Days of Dunkirk
5th Overall Rheinland-Pfalz Rundfahrt
5th Overall Three Days of De Panne
7th Trofeo Matteotti
1999
Giro d'Italia

1st Stage 22
1st Intergiro classification

1st Grand Prix Pino Cerami
4th Paris–Tours
4th Coppa Bernocchi
8th Overall Giro della Provincia di Lucca
10th Dwars door Gendringen
2000
1st Brussel–Izegem
Giro d'Italia

1st Stage 16
1st Intergiro classification

1st Stage 4 Giro della Provincia di Lucca
2nd Gran Premio Città di Rio Saliceto e Correggio
5th Overall Ronde van Nederland

1st Stage 1

5th Grand Prix d'Ouverture La Marseillaise
9th Overall Tour de la Région Wallonne
9th Tour de Vendée
10th Gran Premio Bruno Beghelli
2001
1st Stage 1 Tour de Romandie
1st Stage 7 Paris–Nice
1st Stage 1 Tour de la Région Wallonne
4th HEW Cyclassics
4th Philadelphia International Cycling Classic
4th Paris–Camembert
8th Classic Haribo
2002
1st Firenze–Pistoia
1st Stage 1 Brixia Tour
7th Milano–Torino
2003
2nd Trofeo Manacor
2004
1st Stage 2 Tour de la Région Wallonne
1st Stage 2 Danmark Rundt
8th HEW Cyclassics
2005
1st Stage 6 Tour of Austria
3rd Overall Tirreno–Adriatico
3rd Overall Tour of Qatar
5th Rund um die Hainleite
10th Giro della Provincia di Lucca
2006
1st Overall Tour de la Région Wallonne

1st Points classification
1st Stages 2 & 4

1st Stage 7 Tour of Austria
1st Stage 3 Tour de Pologne
5th Overall Tour of Qatar
5th Giro della Provincia di Lucca
2007
4th Overall Tour de Picardie
7th Coppa Bernocchi

== See also ==
- List of doping cases in cycling
