= Marco Serpellini =

Italian cyclist

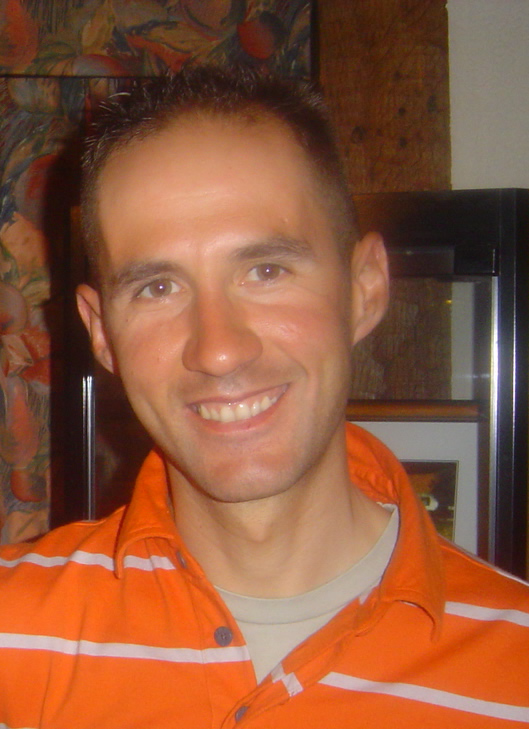

Personal information
- Full name: Marco Serpellini
- Born: 4 August 1972 (age 54) Lovere, Italy
- Height: 1.88 m (6 ft 2 in)
- Weight: 75 kg (165 lb)

Cycling career
- Sport: Cycling
- Discipline: Road
- Role: Rider

Professional team
- 1994–1996: Lampre–Panaria
- 1997–1998: Brescialat–Oyster
- 1999–2003: Lampre–Daikin
- 2004–2005: Gerolsteiner
- 2006: Unibet.com

Marco Serpellini (born 4 August 1972) is an Italian former road bicycle racer.

== Major results ==
1989
3rd Overall Grand Prix Rüebliland

1st Stage 4

1990
1st Road race, UCI Junior Road World Championships
1st Trofeo Emilio Paganessi
1992
1st Giro del Canavese
1994
3rd Overall Hofbrau Cup
1995
4th Chrono des Herbiers
10th Gent–Wevelgem
10th Trofeo Laigueglia
10th Overall Tour Méditerranéen
10th Firenze–Pistoia
1996
1st Grand Prix Pino Cerami
4th Overall Driedaagse van De Panne-Koksijde
10th Overall Tirreno–Adriatico
10th Overall Vuelta a Murcia
1997
3rd Tre Valli Varesine
8th Trofeo dello Scalatore
1998
1st Overall Volta a Portugal

1st Stage 4

1st Giro del Piemonte
1st Grand Prix Pino Cerami
2nd GP d'Europe (with Marco Velo)
3rd Milano–Torino
4th Firenze–Pistoia
5th De Brabantse Pijl
5th GP de la Ville de Rennes
6th Giro del Veneto
7th Giro di Lombardia
9th Overall Vuelta a España
10th Overall Driedaagse van De Panne-Koksijde
1999
2nd Giro del Piemonte
2nd Coppa Sabatini
4th Breitling Grand Prix
5th Paris–Tours
5th GP Rik Van Steenbergen
6th Luk-Cup Bühl
7th Giro di Lombardia
7th Giro del Lazio
8th Paris–Brussels
9th Firenze–Pistoia
10th Overall Ronde van Nederland
10th Giro dell'Emilia
2000
1st Gran Premio Bruno Beghelli
1st Stage 3 Bicicleta Vasca
3rd Japan Cup Cycle Road Race
5th Overall Tirreno–Adriatico
7th Coppa Bernocchi
8th Overall Giro della Provincia di Lucca
8th Kuurne–Brussels–Kuurne
9th Giro del Lazio
9th Overall Driedaagse van De Panne-Koksijde
9th Trofeo Pantalica
2001
4th Japan Cup Cycle Road Race
7th Züri-Metzgete
8th Giro della Provincia di Siracusa
9th Trofeo Pantalica
2002
4th Giro di Lombardia
5th Milano–Torino
5th Giro del Lazio
6th Giro di Romagna
2003
1st Gran Premio Città di Camaiore
1st Mountains classification International Tour of Rhodes
2004
4th Giro del Lazio
2006
6th Overall Ster Elektrotoer
8th Overall Course de la Paix

1st Stage 4

=== Grand Tour general classification results timeline ===
Grand Tour	1994	1995	1996	1997	1998	1999	2000	2001	2002	2003	2004
Giro d'Italia	—	—	68	—	70	—	—	—	—	—	70
Tour de France	DNF	111	—	—	—	55	—	125	74	—	—
Vuelta a España	—	—	—	16	9	—	—	—	—	—	—
