= Vitalicio Seguros =

Team information
- UCI code: VIT
- Registered: Spain
- Founded: 1998
- Disbanded: 2000
- Discipline: Road

Key personnel
- General manager: Javier Minguez

Team name history
- 1998 — Div. I 1999 — Div. I 2000 — Div. I: Vitalicio Seguros (VIT); Vitalicio Seguros- Grupo Generali (VIT); Vitalicio Seguros- Grupo Generali (VIT)
Jersey

Vitalicio Seguros (UCI team code: VIT) was a Spanish professional road bicycle racing cycling team active between 1998 and 2000. It helped launch the careers of triple world champion Óscar Freire, 2001 Vuelta a España winner Ángel Casero and Tour de France yellow jersey wearer Igor González de Galdeano.

The team was started by manager in 1998 with funding from Assicurazioni Generali, who wished to promote their Catalan brand and made a three-year commitment.

== Major wins ==
1998
Stage 3 Vuelta a Aragón, Serguei Smetanine
Stages 1 & 2 Vuelta Ciclista a La Rioja, Serguei Smetanine
Stage 3 Vuelta Ciclista a La Rioja, Juan Carlos Domínguez
Stage 4 Vuelta Asturias, Santiago Blanco
Spain Road Race Championships, Ángel Luis Casero
Stage 1 Vuelta a Castilla y León, Óscar Freire
Overall Volta Ciclista a Catalunya, Hernán Buenahora

Stages 6 & 7

Stage 1 Tour of Galicia, Serguei Smetanine
Stages 13, 15 & 20 Vuelta a España, Andrei Zintchenko
Trofeo Manacor, Elio Aggiano
1999
Stage 5 Tirreno–Adriatico, Igor González de Galdeano
Overall Vuelta a Aragón, Juan Carlos Domínguez

Stage 3

Overall Vuelta Ciclista a La Rioja, Juan Carlos Domínguez

Stage 1, Serguei Smetanine
Stage 3, Juan Carlos Domínguez

Overall Vuelta Asturias

Stage 1, Álvaro González

Spain Road Race Championships, Ángel Luis Casero
Prologue & Stage 3 Volta Ciclista a Catalunya, Ángel Luis Casero
Stage 3 Vuelta a Castilla y León, Elio Aggiano
Stage 3 Vuelta a Burgos, Serguei Smetanine
Prologue & Stage 12 Vuelta a España, Igor González de Galdeano
Subida al Naranco, Santiago Blanco
Overall Escalada a Montjuïc, Andrei Zintchenko

Stage 1a

World Road Race championships, Óscar Freire
2000
Stage 4 Vuelta a Andalucia Ruta Ciclista del Sol, Santiago Blanco
Overall Vuelta Ciclista a la Rioja, Miguel Ángel Martín Perdiguero

Stage 4

Prologue Giro d'Italia, Jan Hruška
Stage 11 Giro d'Italia, Víctor Hugo Peña
Stage 17 Giro d'Italia, Álvaro González
Stage 20 Giro d'Italia, Jan Hruška
Spain Road Race Championships, Álvaro González de Galdeano
Stage 9 Volta a Portugal, Pedro Horrillo
Stage 5 Tour of Galicia, Iván Ramiro Parra
Stage 14 Vuelta a España, Álvaro González
