= Liquigas–Pata =

Cycling team

Team information
- UCI code: BRE (1994–1997)
- Registered: Italy
- Founded: 1994; 32 years ago
- Disbanded: 2001; 25 years ago
- Discipline: Road
- Status: Division II (1999); Division I (2000–2001)
- Bicycles: Wilier Triestina (1995, 1998–2001); Pinarello (1996–1997)

Team name history
- 1994 1995 1996 1997 1998 1999 2000–2001: Brescialat–Refin; Brescialat–Fago; Brescialat–Verynet; Brescialat–Oyster; Liquigas–Brescialat; Liquigas; Liquigas–Pata

Liquigas–Pata was an Italian UCI Professional Continental cycling team active from 1994 to 2001.

== Notable riders ==
- Wladimir Belli (ITA) (1997)
- Fabrizio Bontempi (ITA) (1994–1997)
- Marzio Bruseghin (ITA) (1997–1998)
- Serhiy Honchar (UKR) (2000–2001)
- Zenon Jaskuła (POL) (1996)
- Bruno Leali (ITA) (1994)
- Marco Milesi (ITA) (1994–1999)
- Cristian Moreni (ITA) (1998–2000)
- Mariano Piccoli (ITA) (1995–1998)
- Davide Rebellin (ITA) (2000–2001)
- Fabio Roscioli (ITA) (1994)
- Marco Serpellini (ITA) (1997–1998)
- Gorazd Štangelj (SLO) (2000–2001)
- Eric Vanderaerden (BEL) (1994–1995)
- Marco Velo (ITA) (1996–1997)
- Marco Villa (ITA) (1996–1997)
