= List of teams and cyclists in the 2000 Vuelta a España =

For the 2000 Vuelta a España, the field consisted of 179 riders; 124 finished the race.

== By rider ==
Legend
No.	Starting number worn by the rider during the Vuelta
Pos.	Position in the general classification
DNF	Denotes a rider who did not finish

No.	Name	Nationality	Team	Pos.	Ref
1	Jan Ullrich	Germany	Team Telekom	DNF	
2	Rolf Aldag	Germany	Team Telekom	52	
3	Danilo Hondo	Germany	Team Telekom	DNF	
4	Kai Hundertmarck	Germany	Team Telekom	61	
5	Andreas Klöden	Germany	Team Telekom	DNF	
6	Giovanni Lombardi	Italy	Team Telekom	84	
7	Ralf Grabsch	Germany	Team Telekom	89	
8	Matthias Kessler	Germany	Team Telekom	102	
9	Alexander Vinokourov	Kazakhstan	Team Telekom	28	
11	Alessandro Bertolini	Italy	Alessio	110	
12	Stefano Casagranda	Italy	Alessio	116	
13	Martin Hvastija	Slovenia	Alessio	114	
14	Endrio Leoni	Italy	Alessio	DNF	
15	Marco Magnani	Italy	Alessio	23	
16	Nicola Miceli	Italy	Alessio	DNF	
17	Carlo Finco	Italy	Alessio	81	
18	Leonardo Guidi	Italy	Alessio	112	
19	Alexandr Shefer	Kazakhstan	Alessio	101	
21	Alex Zülle	Switzerland	Banesto	49	
22	José María Jiménez	Spain	Banesto	DNF	
23	Tomasz Brożyna	Poland	Banesto	53	
24	José Vicente García Acosta	Spain	Banesto	63	
25	José Luis Arrieta	Spain	Banesto	103	
26	Jon Odriozola	Spain	Banesto	26	
27	Aitor Osa	Spain	Banesto	51	
28	Unai Osa	Spain	Banesto	56	
29	Eladio Jiménez Sánchez	Spain	Banesto	24	
31	Danilo Di Luca	Italy	Cantina Tollo–Regain	DNF	
32	Paolo Bossoni	Italy	Cantina Tollo–Regain	88	
33	Gabriele Colombo	Italy	Cantina Tollo–Regain	DNF	
34	Massimiliano Gentili	Italy	Cantina Tollo–Regain	9	
35	Federico Giabbecucci	Italy	Cantina Tollo–Regain	DNF	
36	Rodolfo Massi	Italy	Cantina Tollo–Regain	34	
37	Federico Colonna	Italy	Cantina Tollo–Regain	121	
38	Roberto Sgambelluri	Italy	Cantina Tollo–Regain	37	
39	Guido Trenti	United States	Cantina Tollo–Regain	91	
41	Txema del Olmo	Spain	Euskaltel–Euskadi	15	
42	Íñigo Chaurreau	Spain	Euskaltel–Euskadi	DNF	
43	Unai Etxebarria	Venezuela	Euskaltel–Euskadi	DNF	
44	Gorka Gerrikagoitia	Spain	Euskaltel–Euskadi	66	
45	Ramón González Arrieta	Spain	Euskaltel–Euskadi	DNF	
46	Roberto Laiseka	Spain	Euskaltel–Euskadi	6	
47	Alberto López de Munain	Spain	Euskaltel–Euskadi	30	
48	José Alberto Martínez Trinidad	Spain	Euskaltel–Euskadi	DNF	
49	Haimar Zubeldia	Spain	Euskaltel–Euskadi	10	
51	Steven Kleynen	Belgium	Farm Frites	54	
52	Jans Koerts	Netherlands	Farm Frites	DNF	
53	Glenn Magnusson	Sweden	Farm Frites	DNF	
54	Gennady Mikhaylov	Russia	Farm Frites	39	
55	Dirk Ronellenfitsch	Germany	Farm Frites	123	
56	Miguel van Kessel	Netherlands	Farm Frites	60	
57	Gerben Löwik	Netherlands	Farm Frites	117	
58	Geert Van Bondt	Belgium	Farm Frites	DNF	
59	Remco van der Ven	Netherlands	Farm Frites	100	
61	Wladimir Belli	Italy	Fassa Bortolo	12	
62	Fabio Baldato	Italy	Fassa Bortolo	98	
63	Gabriele Balducci	Italy	Fassa Bortolo	DNF	
64	Alessandro Petacchi	Italy	Fassa Bortolo	77	
65	Volodymir Hustov	Ukraine	Fassa Bortolo	44	
66	Nicola Loda	Italy	Fassa Bortolo	97	
67	Andrea Peron	Italy	Fassa Bortolo	58	
68	Raimondas Rumšas	Lithuania	Fassa Bortolo	5	
69	Paolo Tiralongo	Italy	Fassa Bortolo	96	
71	Florent Brard	France	Festina	DNF	
72	Ángel Casero	Spain	Festina	2	
73	Rafael Casero	Spain	Festina	119	
74	David Clinger	United States	Festina	71	
75	Giuseppe Di Grande	Italy	Festina	DNF	
76	Félix García Casas	Spain	Festina	21	
77	Jaime Hernández Bertrán	Spain	Festina	80	
78	Fabian Jeker	Switzerland	Festina	25	
79	Rolf Huser	Switzerland	Festina	64	
81	Eleuterio Anguita	Spain	Jazztel–Costa de Almería	41	
82	César Pérez Padrón	Spain	Jazztel–Costa de Almería	106	
83	Diego Prior	Spain	Jazztel–Costa de Almería	111	
84	Ricardo Valdés	Spain	Jazztel–Costa de Almería	79	
85	Carlos Golbano	Spain	Jazztel–Costa de Almería	86	
86	Fabio Roscioli	Italy	Jazztel–Costa de Almería	85	
87	Ginés Salmerón	Spain	Jazztel–Costa de Almería	DNF	
88	Pablo Soler	Spain	Jazztel–Costa de Almería	92	
89	Mario Traversoni	Italy	Jazztel–Costa de Almería	DNF	
91	Christophe Bassons	France	Jean Delatour	DNF	
92	Frédéric Bessy	France	Jean Delatour	DNF	
93	Gilles Bouvard	France	Jean Delatour	DNF	
94	Laurent Brochard	France	Jean Delatour	32	
95	Patrice Halgand	France	Jean Delatour	48	
96	Christophe Oriol	France	Jean Delatour	DNF	
97	Eddy Seigneur	France	Jean Delatour	DNF	
98	Cyril Dessel	France	Jean Delatour	99	
99	Bruno Thibout	France	Jean Delatour	DNF	
101	Roberto Heras	Spain	Kelme–Costa Blanca	1	
102	Fernando Escartín	Spain	Kelme–Costa Blanca	7	
103	Santiago Botero	Colombia	Kelme–Costa Blanca	72	
104	Francisco Cabello	Spain	Kelme–Costa Blanca	83	
105	Félix Cárdenas	Colombia	Kelme–Costa Blanca	31	
106	José Enrique Gutiérrez	Spain	Kelme–Costa Blanca	36	
107	José Luis Rubiera	Spain	Kelme–Costa Blanca	11	
108	Óscar Sevilla	Spain	Kelme–Costa Blanca	14	
109	José Ángel Vidal	Spain	Kelme–Costa Blanca	93	
111	Oscar Camenzind	Switzerland	Lampre–Daikin	22	
112	Simone Bertoletti	Italy	Lampre–Daikin	73	
113	Massimo Codol	Italy	Lampre–Daikin	40	
114	Marco Della Vedova	Italy	Lampre–Daikin	46	
115	Matteo Frutti	Italy	Lampre–Daikin	DNF	
116	Juan Manuel Gárate	Spain	Lampre–Daikin	62	
117	Mariano Piccoli	Italy	Lampre–Daikin	50	
118	Gilberto Simoni	Italy	Lampre–Daikin	29	
119	Ján Svorada	Czech Republic	Lampre–Daikin	DNF	
121	Andrei Zintchenko	Russia	LA Aluminios-Pecol	27	
122	Bruno Castanheira	Portugal	LA Aluminios-Pecol	DNF	
123	Antonio De La Torre	Spain	LA Aluminios-Pecol	DNF	
124	Pedro Lopes Goncalves	Portugal	LA Aluminios-Pecol	DNF	
125	Fernando Mota	Portugal	LA Aluminios-Pecol	109	
126	José Rosa Ribeiro	Portugal	LA Aluminios-Pecol	67	
127	Saulius Šarkauskas	Lithuania	LA Aluminios-Pecol	69	
128	Youri Sourkov	Kazakhstan	LA Aluminios-Pecol	95	
129	Rubén Oarbeascoa	Spain	LA Aluminios-Pecol	105	
131	Serhiy Honchar	Ukraine	Liquigas–Pata	57	
132	Daniele Contrini	Italy	Liquigas–Pata	DNF	
133	Mirko Marini	Italy	Liquigas–Pata	DNF	
134	Cristian Moreni	Italy	Liquigas–Pata	65	
135	Giancarlo Raimondi	Italy	Liquigas–Pata	DNF	
136	Ellis Rastelli	Italy	Liquigas–Pata	DNF	
137	Alessandro Spezialetti	Italy	Liquigas–Pata	DNF	
138	Andrey Teteryuk	Kazakhstan	Liquigas–Pata	43	
139	Marco Zanotti	Italy	Liquigas–Pata	DNF	
141	Pavel Tonkov	Russia	Mapei–Quick-Step	3	
142	Manuel Beltrán	Spain	Mapei–Quick-Step	DNF	
143	Davide Bramati	Italy	Mapei–Quick-Step	82	
144	Gianni Faresin	Italy	Mapei–Quick-Step	20	
145	Paolo Fornaciari	Italy	Mapei–Quick-Step	94	
146	Óscar Freire	Spain	Mapei–Quick-Step	DNF	
147	Paolo Lanfranchi	Italy	Mapei–Quick-Step	38	
148	Andrea Tafi	Italy	Mapei–Quick-Step	74	
149	Dario Cioni	Italy	Mapei–Quick-Step	90	
151	Abraham Olano	Spain	ONCE–Deutsche Bank	19	
152	Íñigo Cuesta	Spain	ONCE–Deutsche Bank	DNF	
153	Rafael Díaz Justo	Spain	ONCE–Deutsche Bank	33	
154	David Etxebarria	Spain	ONCE–Deutsche Bank	DNF	
155	Marcelino García Alonso	Spain	ONCE–Deutsche Bank	70	
156	Santos González Capilla	Spain	ONCE–Deutsche Bank	4	
157	Peter Luttenberger	Austria	ONCE–Deutsche Bank	DNF	
158	Carlos Sastre	Spain	ONCE–Deutsche Bank	8	
159	Mikel Zarrabeitia	Spain	ONCE–Deutsche Bank	DNF	
161	Richard Virenque	France	Team Polti	16	
162	Michele Colleoni	Italy	Team Polti	107	
163	Daniel Clavero	Spain	Team Polti	68	
164	Mirko Crepaldi	Italy	Team Polti	DNF	
165	Ivan Gotti	Italy	Team Polti	DNF	
166	Pascal Hervé	France	Team Polti	17	
167	Oscar Pelliccioli	Italy	Team Polti	108	
168	Rafael Mateos Pérez	Spain	Team Polti	DNF	
169	José Manuel Uría	Spain	Team Polti	47	
171	Andrés Bermejo	Spain	Colchon Relax–Fuenlabrada	124	
172	Nácor Burgos	Spain	Colchon Relax–Fuenlabrada	78	
173	Juan Antonio Flecha	Spain	Colchon Relax–Fuenlabrada	113	
174	César García Calvo	Spain	Colchon Relax–Fuenlabrada	DNF	
175	Eduardo Hernández Bailo	Spain	Colchon Relax–Fuenlabrada	118	
176	Pedro Díaz Lobato	Spain	Colchon Relax–Fuenlabrada	76	
177	Martín Garrido	Argentina	Colchon Relax–Fuenlabrada	87	
178	Germán Nieto	Spain	Colchon Relax–Fuenlabrada	120	
179	José Vázquez	Spain	Colchon Relax–Fuenlabrada	115	
181	Laurent Dufaux	Switzerland	Saeco–Valli & Valli	DNF	
182	Jörg Ludewig	Germany	Saeco–Valli & Valli	DNF	
183	Giuseppe Calcaterra	Italy	Saeco–Valli & Valli	DNF	
184	Mario Cipollini	Italy	Saeco–Valli & Valli	DNF	
185	Biagio Conte	Italy	Saeco–Valli & Valli	122	
186	Alessio Galletti	Italy	Saeco–Valli & Valli	DNF	
187	Armin Meier	Switzerland	Saeco–Valli & Valli	104	
188	Igor Pugaci	Moldova	Saeco–Valli & Valli	42	
189	Francesco Secchiari	Italy	Saeco–Valli & Valli	DNF	
191	Igor González de Galdeano	Spain	Vitalicio Seguros	DNF	
192	Santiago Blanco	Spain	Vitalicio Seguros	13	
193	Francisco Cerezo	Spain	Vitalicio Seguros	55	
194	Francisco García Rodríguez	Spain	Vitalicio Seguros	18	
195	Álvaro González de Galdeano	Spain	Vitalicio Seguros	DNF	
196	Jan Hruška	Czech Republic	Vitalicio Seguros	75	
197	Iván Parra	Colombia	Vitalicio Seguros	59	
198	Víctor Hugo Peña	Colombia	Vitalicio Seguros	45	
199	Juan Carlos Vicario	Spain	Vitalicio Seguros	35	
