= 2000 Vuelta a España, Stage 1 to Stage 11 =

Cycling race stages

The 2000 Vuelta a España was the 55th edition of the Vuelta a España, one of cycling's Grand Tours. The Vuelta began in Málaga, with an individual time trial on 26 August, and Stage 11 occurred on 5 September with a stage to Arcalis. The race finished in Madrid on 17 September.

== Stage 1 ==
26 August 2000 — Málaga to Málaga, 13.3 km (8.3 mi) (ITT)

Stage 1 result and general classification after stage 1

Rank	Rider	Team	Time
1	Alex Zülle (SUI)	Banesto	17' 08"
2	Abraham Olano (ESP)	ONCE–Deutsche Bank	+ 2"
3	Jan Hruška (CZE)	Vitalicio Seguros	+ 4"
4	Víctor Hugo Peña (COL)	Vitalicio Seguros	+ 15"
5	Íñigo Cuesta (ESP)	ONCE–Deutsche Bank	+ 21"
6	Igor González de Galdeano (ESP)	Vitalicio Seguros	+ 28"
7	Andrey Teteryuk (KAZ)	Liquigas–Pata	+ 30"
8	Félix García Casas (ESP)	Festina	+ 32"
9	Ángel Casero (ESP)	Festina	+ 33"
10	Álvaro González de Galdeano (ESP)	Vitalicio Seguros	+ 34"

== Stage 2 ==
27 August 2000 — Málaga to Córdoba, 167.5 km (104.1 mi)

Stage 2 result

Rank	Rider	Team	Time
1	Óscar Freire (ESP)	Mapei–Quick-Step	4h 01' 23"
2	Jans Koerts (NED)	Farm Frites	s.t.
3	Marco Zanotti (ITA)	Liquigas–Pata	s.t.
4	Martín Garrido (ARG)	Colchon Relax–Fuenlabrada	s.t.
5	Giovanni Lombardi (ITA)	Team Telekom	s.t.
6	Endrio Leoni (ITA)	Alessio	s.t.
7	Mario Traversoni (ITA)	Jazztel–Costa de Almería	s.t.
8	Mario Cipollini (ITA)	Saeco–Valli & Valli	s.t.
9	Danilo Hondo (GER)	Team Telekom	s.t.
10	Fabio Baldato (ITA)	Fassa Bortolo	s.t.

General classification after stage 2

Rank	Rider	Team	Time
1	Alex Zülle (SUI)	Banesto	4h 18' 31"
2	Abraham Olano (ESP)	ONCE–Deutsche Bank	+ 2"
3	Jan Hruška (CZE)	Vitalicio Seguros	+ 4"
4	Víctor Hugo Peña (COL)	Vitalicio Seguros	+ 15"
5	Íñigo Cuesta (ESP)	ONCE–Deutsche Bank	+ 21"
6	Igor González de Galdeano (ESP)	Vitalicio Seguros	+ 28"
7	Andrey Teteryuk (KAZ)	Liquigas–Pata	+ 30"
8	Félix García Casas (ESP)	Festina	+ 32"
9	Ángel Casero (ESP)	Festina	+ 33"
10	Álvaro González de Galdeano (ESP)	Vitalicio Seguros	+ 34"

== Stage 3 ==
28 August 2000 — Montoro to Valdepeñas, 198.4 km (123.3 mi)

Stage 3 result

Rank	Rider	Team	Time
1	Jans Koerts (NED)	Farm Frites	5h 08' 27"
2	Alessandro Petacchi (ITA)	Fassa Bortolo	s.t.
3	Ján Svorada (CZE)	Lampre–Daikin	s.t.
4	Giancarlo Raimondi (ITA)	Liquigas–Pata	s.t.
5	Mario Traversoni (ITA)	Jazztel–Costa de Almería	s.t.
6	Nicola Loda (ITA)	Fassa Bortolo	s.t.
7	Danilo Hondo (GER)	Team Telekom	s.t.
8	Federico Colonna (ITA)	Cantina Tollo–Regain	s.t.
9	Matteo Frutti (ITA)	Lampre–Daikin	s.t.
10	Óscar Freire (ESP)	Mapei–Quick-Step	s.t.

General classification after stage 3

Rank	Rider	Team	Time
1	Alex Zülle (SUI)	Banesto	9h 26' 58"
2	Abraham Olano (ESP)	ONCE–Deutsche Bank	+ 2"
3	Jan Hruška (CZE)	Vitalicio Seguros	+ 4"
4	Víctor Hugo Peña (COL)	Vitalicio Seguros	+ 15"
5	Íñigo Cuesta (ESP)	ONCE–Deutsche Bank	+ 21"
6	Igor González de Galdeano (ESP)	Vitalicio Seguros	+ 28"
7	Andrey Teteryuk (KAZ)	Liquigas–Pata	+ 30"
8	Félix García Casas (ESP)	Festina	+ 32"
9	Ángel Casero (ESP)	Festina	+ 33"
10	Álvaro González de Galdeano (ESP)	Vitalicio Seguros	+ 34"

== Stage 4 ==
29 August 2000 — Valdepeñas to Albacete, 159 km (99 mi)

Stage 4 result

Rank	Rider	Team	Time
1	Óscar Freire (ESP)	Mapei–Quick-Step	3h 46' 29"
2	Giovanni Lombardi (ITA)	Team Telekom	s.t.
3	Cristian Moreni (ITA)	Liquigas–Pata	s.t.
4	Endrio Leoni (ITA)	Alessio	s.t.
5	Ján Svorada (CZE)	Lampre–Daikin	s.t.
6	Alessandro Petacchi (ITA)	Fassa Bortolo	s.t.
7	Patrice Halgand (FRA)	Jean Delatour	s.t.
8	Mario Cipollini (ITA)	Saeco–Valli & Valli	s.t.
9	Andrea Peron (ITA)	Fassa Bortolo	s.t.
10	Rolf Huser (SUI)	Festina	s.t.

General classification after stage 4

Rank	Rider	Team	Time
1	Alex Zülle (SUI)	Banesto	13h 13' 27"
2	Abraham Olano (ESP)	ONCE–Deutsche Bank	+ 2"
3	Íñigo Cuesta (ESP)	ONCE–Deutsche Bank	+ 21"
4	Igor González de Galdeano (ESP)	Vitalicio Seguros	+ 28"
5	Andrey Teteryuk (KAZ)	Liquigas–Pata	+ 30"
6	Ángel Casero (ESP)	Festina	+ 33"
7	Santos González (ESP)	ONCE–Deutsche Bank	+ 40"
8	Gianni Faresin (ITA)	Mapei–Quick-Step	+ 41"
9	Jan Ullrich (GER)	Team Telekom	+ 43"
10	Raimondas Rumšas (LTU)	Fassa Bortolo	+ 49"

== Stage 5 ==
30 August 2000 — Albacete to Xorret de Catí, 152.3 km (94.6 mi)

Stage 5 result

Rank	Rider	Team	Time
1	Eladio Jiménez (ESP)	Banesto	3h 54' 59"
2	Roberto Heras (ESP)	Kelme–Costa Blanca	+ 3"
3	Alex Zülle (SUI)	Banesto	+ 9"
4	Ivan Gotti (ITA)	Team Polti	s.t.
5	Pascal Hervé (FRA)	Team Polti	+ 32"
6	Raimondas Rumšas (LTU)	Fassa Bortolo	s.t.
7	José Luis Rubiera (ESP)	Kelme–Costa Blanca	+ 41"
8	Jan Ullrich (GER)	Team Telekom	s.t.
9	Igor González de Galdeano (ESP)	Vitalicio Seguros	s.t.
10	Haimar Zubeldia (ESP)	Euskaltel–Euskadi	s.t.

General classification after stage 5

Rank	Rider	Team	Time
1	Alex Zülle (SUI)	Banesto	17h 08' 25"
2	Abraham Olano (ESP)	ONCE–Deutsche Bank	+ 1' 09"
3	Igor González de Galdeano (ESP)	Vitalicio Seguros	+ 1' 10"
4	Ángel Casero (ESP)	Festina	+ 1' 15"
5	Raimondas Rumšas (LTU)	Fassa Bortolo	+ 1' 22"
6	Jan Ullrich (GER)	Team Telekom	+ 1' 23"
7	Pavel Tonkov (RUS)	Mapei–Quick-Step	+ 1' 40"
8	Santos González (ESP)	ONCE–Deutsche Bank	+ 1' 52"
9	Roberto Heras (ESP)	Kelme–Costa Blanca	+ 1' 56"
10	Íñigo Cuesta (ESP)	ONCE–Deutsche Bank	+ 2' 03"

== Stage 6 ==
31 August 2000 — Benidorm to Valencia, 155.5 km (96.6 mi)

Stage 6 result

Rank	Rider	Team	Time
1	Paolo Bossoni (ITA)	Cantina Tollo–Regain	3h 54' 59"
2	Giovanni Lombardi (ITA)	Team Telekom	s.t.
3	Óscar Freire (ESP)	Mapei–Quick-Step	s.t.
4	Endrio Leoni (ITA)	Alessio	s.t.
5	Massimiliano Gentili (ITA)	Cantina Tollo–Regain	s.t.
6	Wladimir Belli (ITA)	Fassa Bortolo	s.t.
7	Fabio Roscioli (ITA)	Jazztel–Costa de Almería	s.t.
8	Jon Odriozola (ESP)	Banesto	s.t.
9	Mikel Zarrabeitia (ESP)	ONCE–Deutsche Bank	s.t.
10	Ángel Casero (ESP)	Festina	s.t.

General classification after stage 6

Rank	Rider	Team	Time
1	Alex Zülle (SUI)	Banesto	20h 35' 41"
2	Abraham Olano (ESP)	ONCE–Deutsche Bank	+ 1' 09"
3	Igor González de Galdeano (ESP)	Vitalicio Seguros	+ 1' 10"
4	Ángel Casero (ESP)	Festina	+ 1' 15"
5	Jan Ullrich (GER)	Team Telekom	+ 1' 23"
6	Roberto Heras (ESP)	Kelme–Costa Blanca	+ 1' 56"
7	Raimondas Rumšas (LTU)	Fassa Bortolo	+ 2' 06"
8	Pavel Tonkov (RUS)	Mapei–Quick-Step	+ 2' 24"
9	Óscar Freire (ESP)	Mapei–Quick-Step	+ 2' 27"
10	Wladimir Belli (ITA)	Fassa Bortolo	+ 2' 35"

== Stage 7 ==
1 September 2000 — Valencia to Morella, 175 km (109 mi)

Stage 7 result

Rank	Rider	Team	Time
1	Roberto Heras (ESP)	Kelme–Costa Blanca	3h 55' 20"
2	Patrice Halgand (FRA)	Jean Delatour	+ 2"
3	Jan Ullrich (GER)	Team Telekom	+ 3"
4	Óscar Freire (ESP)	Mapei–Quick-Step	s.t.
5	Laurent Dufaux (SUI)	Saeco–Valli & Valli	s.t.
6	Alex Zülle (SUI)	Banesto	s.t.
7	Mikel Zarrabeitia (ESP)	ONCE–Deutsche Bank	s.t.
8	Ángel Casero (ESP)	Festina	s.t.
9	David Etxebarria (ESP)	ONCE–Deutsche Bank	s.t.
10	Pascal Hervé (FRA)	Team Polti	s.t.

General classification after stage 7

Rank	Rider	Team	Time
1	Alex Zülle (SUI)	Banesto	24h 31' 04"
2	Abraham Olano (ESP)	ONCE–Deutsche Bank	+ 1' 09"
3	Igor González de Galdeano (ESP)	Vitalicio Seguros	+ 1' 10"
4	Jan Ullrich (GER)	Team Telekom	+ 1' 13"
5	Ángel Casero (ESP)	Festina	+ 1' 15"
6	Roberto Heras (ESP)	Kelme–Costa Blanca	+ 1' 33"
7	Raimondas Rumšas (LTU)	Fassa Bortolo	+ 2' 06"
8	Pavel Tonkov (RUS)	Mapei–Quick-Step	+ 2' 24"
9	Óscar Freire (ESP)	Mapei–Quick-Step	+ 2' 27"
10	Wladimir Belli (ITA)	Fassa Bortolo	+ 2' 35"

== Stage 8 ==
2 September 2000 — Vinaròs to Port Aventura, 168.5 km (104.7 mi)

Stage 8 result

Rank	Rider	Team	Time
1	Alessandro Petacchi (ITA)	Fassa Bortolo	3h 52' 10"
2	Giovanni Lombardi (ITA)	Team Telekom	s.t.
3	Endrio Leoni (ITA)	Alessio	s.t.
4	Martín Garrido (ARG)	Colchon Relax–Fuenlabrada	s.t.
5	Federico Colonna (ITA)	Cantina Tollo–Regain	s.t.
6	Saulius Šarkauskas (LTU)	LA Alumínios–Pecol–Calbrita	s.t.
7	Marco Zanotti (ITA)	Liquigas–Pata	s.t.
8	Massimiliano Gentili (ITA)	Cantina Tollo–Regain	s.t.
9	Mariano Piccoli (ITA)	Lampre–Daikin	s.t.
10	David Clinger (USA)	Festina	s.t.

General classification after stage 8

Rank	Rider	Team	Time
1	Alex Zülle (SUI)	Banesto	28h 23' 14"
2	Abraham Olano (ESP)	ONCE–Deutsche Bank	+ 1' 09"
3	Igor González de Galdeano (ESP)	Vitalicio Seguros	+ 1' 10"
4	Jan Ullrich (GER)	Team Telekom	+ 1' 13"
5	Ángel Casero (ESP)	Festina	+ 1' 15"
6	Roberto Heras (ESP)	Kelme–Costa Blanca	+ 1' 33"
7	Raimondas Rumšas (LTU)	Fassa Bortolo	+ 2' 06"
8	Pavel Tonkov (RUS)	Mapei–Quick-Step	+ 2' 24"
9	Wladimir Belli (ITA)	Fassa Bortolo	+ 2' 35"
10	Santos González (ESP)	ONCE–Deutsche Bank	+ 2' 36"

== Stage 9 ==
3 September 2000 — Tarragona to Tarragona, 37.6 km (23.4 mi) (ITT)

Stage 9 result

Rank	Rider	Team	Time
1	Abraham Olano (ESP)	ONCE–Deutsche Bank	45' 02"
2	Santos González (ESP)	ONCE–Deutsche Bank	+ 13"
3	Ángel Casero (ESP)	Festina	+ 15"
4	Jan Hruška (CZE)	Vitalicio Seguros	+ 43"
5	Víctor Hugo Peña (COL)	Vitalicio Seguros	+ 55"
6	Jan Ullrich (GER)	Team Telekom	+ 1' 01"
7	Andrey Teteryuk (KAZ)	Liquigas–Pata	+ 1' 36"
8	José Luis Rubiera (ESP)	Kelme–Costa Blanca	+ 1' 46"
9	Mikel Zarrabeitia (ESP)	ONCE–Deutsche Bank	s.t.
10	Serhiy Honchar (UKR)	Liquigas–Pata	+ 1' 49"

General classification after stage 9

Rank	Rider	Team	Time
1	Abraham Olano (ESP)	ONCE–Deutsche Bank	29h 09' 25"
2	Ángel Casero (ESP)	Festina	+ 21"
3	Alex Zülle (SUI)	Banesto	+ 55"
4	Jan Ullrich (GER)	Team Telekom	+ 1' 05"
5	Santos González (ESP)	ONCE–Deutsche Bank	+ 1' 40"
6	Igor González de Galdeano (ESP)	Vitalicio Seguros	+ 2' 01"
7	Roberto Heras (ESP)	Kelme–Costa Blanca	+ 2' 41"
8	Pavel Tonkov (RUS)	Mapei–Quick-Step	+ 3' 17"
9	Mikel Zarrabeitia (ESP)	ONCE–Deutsche Bank	+ 3' 18"
10	Raimondas Rumšas (LTU)	Fassa Bortolo	+ 3' 32"

== Stage 10 ==
4 September 2000 — Sabadell to Supermolina, 165.8 km (103.0 mi)

Stage 10 result

Rank	Rider	Team	Time
1	Félix Cárdenas (COL)	Kelme–Costa Blanca	4h 34' 10"
2	Jon Odriozola (ESP)	Banesto	s.t.
3	Víctor Hugo Peña (COL)	Vitalicio Seguros	+ 2"
4	Oscar Camenzind (SUI)	Lampre–Daikin	+ 15"
5	Santos González (ESP)	ONCE–Deutsche Bank	s.t.
6	Txema del Olmo (ESP)	Euskaltel–Euskadi	+ 17"
7	Volodymir Hustov (UKR)	Fassa Bortolo	+ 40"
8	Gianni Faresin (ITA)	Mapei–Quick-Step	+ 57"
9	Rodolfo Massi (ITA)	Cantina Tollo–Regain	+ 1' 41"
10	Félix García Casas (ESP)	Festina	+ 2' 07"

General classification after stage 10

Rank	Rider	Team	Time
1	Santos González (ESP)	ONCE–Deutsche Bank	33h 45' 30"
2	Abraham Olano (ESP)	ONCE–Deutsche Bank	+ 52"
3	Ángel Casero (ESP)	Festina	+ 59"
4	Jan Ullrich (GER)	Team Telekom	+ 2' 00"
5	Igor González de Galdeano (ESP)	Vitalicio Seguros	+ 2' 41"
6	Roberto Heras (ESP)	Kelme–Costa Blanca	+ 3' 21"
7	Mikel Zarrabeitia (ESP)	ONCE–Deutsche Bank	+ 3' 58"
8	Pavel Tonkov (RUS)	Mapei–Quick-Step	+ 4' 01"
9	Raimondas Rumšas (LTU)	Fassa Bortolo	+ 4' 16"
10	Wladimir Belli (ITA)	Fassa Bortolo	+ 4' 32"

== Stage 11 ==
5 September 2000 — Alp to Arcalis, 136.5 km (84.8 mi)

Stage 11 result

Rank	Rider	Team	Time
1	Roberto Laiseka (ESP)	Euskaltel–Euskadi	3h 43' 25"
2	Carlos Sastre (ESP)	ONCE–Deutsche Bank	+ 50"
3	Santiago Blanco (ESP)	Vitalicio Seguros	+ 1' 04"
4	Roberto Heras (ESP)	Kelme–Costa Blanca	+ 1' 50"
5	Manuel Beltrán (ESP)	Mapei–Quick-Step	s.t.
6	Fernando Escartín (ESP)	Kelme–Costa Blanca	+ 2' 00"
7	José Luis Rubiera (ESP)	Kelme–Costa Blanca	+ 2' 37"
8	Óscar Sevilla (ESP)	Kelme–Costa Blanca	+ 2' 40"
9	Pavel Tonkov (RUS)	Mapei–Quick-Step	+ 2' 42"
10	Richard Virenque (FRA)	Team Polti	+ 2' 57"

General classification after stage 11

Rank	Rider	Team	Time
1	Ángel Casero (ESP)	Festina	37h 32' 51"
2	Roberto Heras (ESP)	Kelme–Costa Blanca	+ 1' 15"
3	Igor González de Galdeano (ESP)	Vitalicio Seguros	+ 1' 42"
4	Jan Ullrich (GER)	Team Telekom	+ 2' 21"
5	Santos González (ESP)	ONCE–Deutsche Bank	+ 2' 44"
6	Pavel Tonkov (RUS)	Mapei–Quick-Step	+ 2' 47"
7	Manuel Beltrán (ESP)	Mapei–Quick-Step	s.t.
8	Wladimir Belli (ITA)	Fassa Bortolo	+ 3' 35"
9	Abraham Olano (ESP)	ONCE–Deutsche Bank	+ 3' 39"
10	Raimondas Rumšas (LTU)	Fassa Bortolo	+ 3' 46"
