= 2000 Vuelta a España, Stage 12 to Stage 21 =

Cycling race stages

The 2000 Vuelta a España was the 55th edition of the Vuelta a España, one of cycling's Grand Tours. The Vuelta began in Málaga, with an individual time trial on 26 August, and Stage 12 occurred on 7 September with a stage from Zaragoza. The race finished in Madrid on 17 September.

== Stage 12 ==
7 September 2000 — Zaragoza to Zaragoza, 131.5 km (81.7 mi)

Stage 12 result

Rank	Rider	Team	Time
1	Alessandro Petacchi (ITA)	Fassa Bortolo	2h 44' 36"
2	Giovanni Lombardi (ITA)	Team Telekom	s.t.
3	Stefano Casagranda (ITA)	Alessio	s.t.
4	Martín Garrido (ARG)	Colchon Relax–Fuenlabrada	s.t.
5	Massimiliano Gentili (ITA)	Cantina Tollo–Regain	s.t.
6	Leonardo Guidi (ITA)	Alessio	s.t.
7	Remco van der Ven (NED)	Farm Frites	s.t.
8	Ángel Casero (ESP)	Festina	s.t.
9	José Enrique Gutiérrez (ESP)	Kelme–Costa Blanca	s.t.
10	César Pérez Padrón (ESP)	Jazztel–Costa de Almería	s.t.

General classification after stage 12

Rank	Rider	Team	Time
1	Ángel Casero (ESP)	Festina	40h 17' 27"
2	Roberto Heras (ESP)	Kelme–Costa Blanca	+ 1' 15"
3	Igor González de Galdeano (ESP)	Vitalicio Seguros	+ 1' 48"
4	Jan Ullrich (GER)	Team Telekom	+ 2' 33"
5	Santos González (ESP)	ONCE–Deutsche Bank	+ 2' 44"
6	Pavel Tonkov (RUS)	Mapei–Quick-Step	+ 3' 21"
7	Manuel Beltrán (ESP)	Mapei–Quick-Step	s.t.
8	Wladimir Belli (ITA)	Fassa Bortolo	+ 3' 35"
9	Abraham Olano (ESP)	ONCE–Deutsche Bank	+ 3' 39"
10	Raimondas Rumšas (LTU)	Fassa Bortolo	+ 4' 20"

== Stage 13 ==
9 September 2000 — Santander to Santander, 143.3 km (89.0 mi)

Stage 13 result

Rank	Rider	Team	Time
1	Mariano Piccoli (ITA)	Lampre–Daikin	3h 15' 44"
2	Patrice Halgand (FRA)	Jean Delatour	+ 23"
3	Francisco Cabello (ESP)	Kelme–Costa Blanca	s.t.
4	Paolo Bossoni (ITA)	Cantina Tollo–Regain	s.t.
5	Gianni Faresin (ITA)	Mapei–Quick-Step	s.t.
6	Andrei Zintchenko (RUS)	LA Alumínios–Pecol–Calbrita	+ 2' 12"
7	Víctor Hugo Peña (COL)	Vitalicio Seguros	s.t.
8	Biagio Conte (ITA)	Saeco–Valli & Valli	+ 2' 20"
9	Gennady Mikhaylov (RUS)	Farm Frites	s.t.
10	Alessandro Bertolini (ITA)	Alessio	s.t.

General classification after stage 13

Rank	Rider	Team	Time
1	Ángel Casero (ESP)	Festina	43h 35' 31"
2	Roberto Heras (ESP)	Kelme–Costa Blanca	+ 1' 15"
3	Igor González de Galdeano (ESP)	Vitalicio Seguros	+ 1' 48"
4	Santos González (ESP)	ONCE–Deutsche Bank	+ 2' 44"
5	Pavel Tonkov (RUS)	Mapei–Quick-Step	+ 3' 21"
6	Manuel Beltrán (ESP)	Mapei–Quick-Step	s.t.
7	Wladimir Belli (ITA)	Fassa Bortolo	+ 3' 35"
8	Abraham Olano (ESP)	ONCE–Deutsche Bank	+ 3' 39"
9	Raimondas Rumšas (LTU)	Fassa Bortolo	+ 4' 20"
10	José Luis Rubiera (ESP)	Kelme–Costa Blanca	+ 4' 29"

== Stage 14 ==
10 September 2000 — Santander to Lakes of Covadonga, 146.5 km (91.0 mi)

Stage 14 result

Rank	Rider	Team	Time
1	Andrei Zintchenko (RUS)	LA Alumínios–Pecol–Calbrita	3h 38' 08"
2	Igor Pugaci (MDA)	Saeco–Valli & Valli	+ 57"
3	Roberto Heras (ESP)	Kelme–Costa Blanca	+ 1' 00"
4	Félix Cárdenas (COL)	Kelme–Costa Blanca	+ 1' 26"
5	Carlos Sastre (ESP)	ONCE–Deutsche Bank	+ 1' 35"
6	Pascal Hervé (FRA)	Team Polti	+ 1' 37"
7	Paolo Lanfranchi (ITA)	Mapei–Quick-Step	+ 1' 58"
8	Óscar Sevilla (ESP)	Kelme–Costa Blanca	s.t.
9	Santos González (ESP)	ONCE–Deutsche Bank	+ 2' 00"
10	Roberto Laiseka (ESP)	Euskaltel–Euskadi	+ 2' 02"

General classification after stage 14

Rank	Rider	Team	Time
1	Roberto Heras (ESP)	Kelme–Costa Blanca	47h 15' 54"
2	Ángel Casero (ESP)	Festina	s.t.
3	Igor González de Galdeano (ESP)	Vitalicio Seguros	+ 1' 48"
4	Santos González (ESP)	ONCE–Deutsche Bank	+ 2' 29"
5	Pavel Tonkov (RUS)	Mapei–Quick-Step	+ 3' 21"
6	Raimondas Rumšas (LTU)	Fassa Bortolo	+ 4' 19"
7	Carlos Sastre (ESP)	ONCE–Deutsche Bank	+ 4' 57"
8	Wladimir Belli (ITA)	Fassa Bortolo	+ 4' 58"
9	Manuel Beltrán (ESP)	Mapei–Quick-Step	+ 5' 15"
10	José Luis Rubiera (ESP)	Kelme–Costa Blanca	+ 5' 52"

== Stage 15 ==
11 September 2000 — Cangas de Onís to Gijón, 164.2 km (102.0 mi)

Stage 15 result

Rank	Rider	Team	Time
1	Álvaro González de Galdeano (ESP)	Vitalicio Seguros	3h 48' 11"
2	Pascal Hervé (FRA)	Team Polti	s.t.
3	Jon Odriozola (ESP)	Banesto	s.t.
4	Massimiliano Gentili (ITA)	Cantina Tollo–Regain	s.t.
5	Gianni Faresin (ITA)	Mapei–Quick-Step	s.t.
6	Alberto López de Munain (ESP)	Euskaltel–Euskadi	+ 16"
7	Ján Svorada (CZE)	Lampre–Daikin	+ 5' 16"
8	Alessandro Petacchi (ITA)	Fassa Bortolo	s.t.
9	Giovanni Lombardi (ITA)	Team Telekom	s.t.
10	Leonardo Guidi (ITA)	Alessio	s.t.

General classification after stage 15

Rank	Rider	Team	Time
1	Roberto Heras (ESP)	Kelme–Costa Blanca	51h 09' 21"
2	Ángel Casero (ESP)	Festina	s.t.
3	Igor González de Galdeano (ESP)	Vitalicio Seguros	+ 1' 48"
4	Santos González (ESP)	ONCE–Deutsche Bank	+ 2' 29"
5	Pavel Tonkov (RUS)	Mapei–Quick-Step	+ 3' 21"
6	Raimondas Rumšas (LTU)	Fassa Bortolo	+ 4' 19"
7	Carlos Sastre (ESP)	ONCE–Deutsche Bank	+ 4' 57"
8	Wladimir Belli (ITA)	Fassa Bortolo	+ 4' 58"
9	Manuel Beltrán (ESP)	Mapei–Quick-Step	+ 5' 15"
10	José Luis Rubiera (ESP)	Kelme–Costa Blanca	+ 5' 52"

== Stage 16 ==
12 September 2000 — Oviedo to Alto de l'Angliru, 168 km (104 mi)

Stage 16 result

Rank	Rider	Team	Time
1	Gilberto Simoni (ITA)	Lampre–Daikin	4h 37' 34"
2	Jan Hruška (CZE)	Vitalicio Seguros	+ 2' 19"
3	Roberto Heras (ESP)	Kelme–Costa Blanca	+ 2' 58"
4	Tomasz Brożyna (POL)	Banesto	+ 3' 11"
5	Pavel Tonkov (RUS)	Mapei–Quick-Step	+ 4' 27"
6	Roberto Laiseka (ESP)	Euskaltel–Euskadi	s.t.
7	Laurent Brochard (FRA)	Jean Delatour	+ 4' 44"
8	Raimondas Rumšas (LTU)	Fassa Bortolo	+ 5' 16"
9	Gorka Gerrikagoitia (ESP)	Euskaltel–Euskadi	s.t.
10	Fernando Escartín (ESP)	Kelme–Costa Blanca	+ 5' 46"

General classification after stage 16

Rank	Rider	Team	Time
1	Roberto Heras (ESP)	Kelme–Costa Blanca	55h 49' 53"
2	Ángel Casero (ESP)	Festina	+ 3' 41"
3	Pavel Tonkov (RUS)	Mapei–Quick-Step	+ 4' 50"
4	Raimondas Rumšas (LTU)	Fassa Bortolo	+ 6' 37"
5	Santos González (ESP)	ONCE–Deutsche Bank	+ 7' 03"
6	Manuel Beltrán (ESP)	Mapei–Quick-Step	+ 9' 09"
7	Fernando Escartín (ESP)	Kelme–Costa Blanca	+ 9' 16"
8	Carlos Sastre (ESP)	ONCE–Deutsche Bank	+ 9' 23"
9	Massimiliano Gentili (ITA)	Cantina Tollo–Regain	+ 10' 36"
10	Wladimir Belli (ITA)	Fassa Bortolo	+ 10' 39"

== Stage 17 ==
13 September 2000 — Benavente to Salamanca, 155.5 km (96.6 mi)

Stage 17 result

Rank	Rider	Team	Time
1	Davide Bramati (ITA)	Mapei–Quick-Step	3h 24' 33"
2	Biagio Conte (ITA)	Saeco–Valli & Valli	+ 9"
3	Fabio Baldato (ITA)	Fassa Bortolo	s.t.
4	Marco Zanotti (ITA)	Liquigas–Pata	s.t.
5	Pedro Díaz Lobato (ESP)	Colchon Relax–Fuenlabrada	s.t.
6	Alessandro Petacchi (ITA)	Fassa Bortolo	+ 57"
7	Mariano Piccoli (ITA)	Lampre–Daikin	s.t.
8	Leonardo Guidi (ITA)	Alessio	s.t.
9	Gerben Löwik (NED)	Farm Frites	s.t.
10	Jon Odriozola (ESP)	Banesto	s.t.

General classification after stage 17

Rank	Rider	Team	Time
1	Roberto Heras (ESP)	Kelme–Costa Blanca	59h 15' 23"
2	Ángel Casero (ESP)	Festina	+ 3' 41"
3	Pavel Tonkov (RUS)	Mapei–Quick-Step	+ 4' 50"
4	Raimondas Rumšas (LTU)	Fassa Bortolo	+ 6' 37"
5	Santos González (ESP)	ONCE–Deutsche Bank	+ 7' 03"
6	Manuel Beltrán (ESP)	Mapei–Quick-Step	+ 9' 09"
7	Fernando Escartín (ESP)	Kelme–Costa Blanca	+ 9' 16"
8	Carlos Sastre (ESP)	ONCE–Deutsche Bank	+ 9' 23"
9	Massimiliano Gentili (ITA)	Cantina Tollo–Regain	+ 10' 36"
10	Wladimir Belli (ITA)	Fassa Bortolo	+ 10' 39"

== Stage 18 ==
14 September 2000 — Béjar to Ciudad Rodrigo, 159 km (99 mi)

Stage 18 result

Rank	Rider	Team	Time
1	Alexander Vinokourov (KAZ)	Team Telekom	3h 52' 54"
2	Roberto Laiseka (ESP)	Euskaltel–Euskadi	s.t.
3	José Vicente García (ESP)	Banesto	s.t.
4	Cristian Moreni (ITA)	Liquigas–Pata	+ 1' 01"
5	Massimiliano Gentili (ITA)	Cantina Tollo–Regain	s.t.
6	Raimondas Rumšas (LTU)	Fassa Bortolo	s.t.
7	Jon Odriozola (ESP)	Banesto	s.t.
8	Wladimir Belli (ITA)	Fassa Bortolo	s.t.
9	Andrei Zintchenko (RUS)	LA Alumínios–Pecol–Calbrita	s.t.
10	Álvaro González de Galdeano (ESP)	Vitalicio Seguros	s.t.

General classification after stage 18

Rank	Rider	Team	Time
1	Roberto Heras (ESP)	Kelme–Costa Blanca	63h 09' 18"
2	Ángel Casero (ESP)	Festina	+ 3' 41"
3	Pavel Tonkov (RUS)	Mapei–Quick-Step	+ 4' 50"
4	Raimondas Rumšas (LTU)	Fassa Bortolo	+ 6' 37"
5	Santos González (ESP)	ONCE–Deutsche Bank	+ 7' 03"
6	Manuel Beltrán (ESP)	Mapei–Quick-Step	+ 9' 09"
7	Fernando Escartín (ESP)	Kelme–Costa Blanca	+ 9' 16"
8	Carlos Sastre (ESP)	ONCE–Deutsche Bank	+ 9' 23"
9	Roberto Laiseka (ESP)	Euskaltel–Euskadi	+ 9' 58"
10	Massimiliano Gentili (ITA)	Cantina Tollo–Regain	+ 10' 36"

== Stage 19 ==
15 September 2000 — Salamanca to Ávila, 130 km (81 mi)

Stage 19 result

Rank	Rider	Team	Time
1	Mariano Piccoli (ITA)	Lampre–Daikin	3h 12' 49"
2	Saulius Šarkauskas (LTU)	LA Alumínios–Pecol–Calbrita	s.t.
3	Laurent Brochard (FRA)	Jean Delatour	s.t.
4	Alessandro Petacchi (ITA)	Fassa Bortolo	s.t.
5	Jon Odriozola (ESP)	Banesto	s.t.
6	Massimiliano Gentili (ITA)	Cantina Tollo–Regain	s.t.
7	Raimondas Rumšas (LTU)	Fassa Bortolo	s.t.
8	Carlos Sastre (ESP)	ONCE–Deutsche Bank	s.t.
9	Félix Cárdenas (COL)	Kelme–Costa Blanca	s.t.
10	Santos González (ESP)	ONCE–Deutsche Bank	s.t.

General classification after stage 19

Rank	Rider	Team	Time
1	Roberto Heras (ESP)	Kelme–Costa Blanca	66h 22' 07"
2	Ángel Casero (ESP)	Festina	+ 3' 41"
3	Pavel Tonkov (RUS)	Mapei–Quick-Step	+ 4' 50"
4	Raimondas Rumšas (LTU)	Fassa Bortolo	+ 6' 37"
5	Santos González (ESP)	ONCE–Deutsche Bank	+ 7' 03"
6	Manuel Beltrán (ESP)	Mapei–Quick-Step	+ 9' 09"
7	Carlos Sastre (ESP)	ONCE–Deutsche Bank	+ 9' 23"
8	Fernando Escartín (ESP)	Kelme–Costa Blanca	+ 9' 27"
9	Roberto Laiseka (ESP)	Euskaltel–Euskadi	+ 10' 09"
10	Massimiliano Gentili (ITA)	Cantina Tollo–Regain	+ 10' 36"

== Stage 20 ==
16 September 2000 — Ávila to Alto de Abantos, 128.2 km (79.7 mi)

Stage 20 result

Rank	Rider	Team	Time
1	Roberto Heras (ESP)	Kelme–Costa Blanca	3h 16' 42"
2	Gilberto Simoni (ITA)	Lampre–Daikin	s.t.
3	Roberto Laiseka (ESP)	Euskaltel–Euskadi	+ 3"
4	José Luis Rubiera (ESP)	Kelme–Costa Blanca	+ 45"
5	Fernando Escartín (ESP)	Kelme–Costa Blanca	s.t.
6	Ángel Casero (ESP)	Festina	s.t.
7	Pavel Tonkov (RUS)	Mapei–Quick-Step	s.t.
8	Raimondas Rumšas (LTU)	Fassa Bortolo	+ 47"
9	Massimiliano Gentili (ITA)	Cantina Tollo–Regain	+ 48"
10	Txema del Olmo (ESP)	Euskaltel–Euskadi	s.t.

General classification after stage 20

Rank	Rider	Team	Time
1	Roberto Heras (ESP)	Kelme–Costa Blanca	69h 38' 49"
2	Ángel Casero (ESP)	Festina	+ 4' 26"
3	Pavel Tonkov (RUS)	Mapei–Quick-Step	+ 5' 35"
4	Raimondas Rumšas (LTU)	Fassa Bortolo	+ 7' 24"
5	Santos González (ESP)	ONCE–Deutsche Bank	+ 7' 51"
6	Roberto Laiseka (ESP)	Euskaltel–Euskadi	+ 10' 12"
7	Fernando Escartín (ESP)	Kelme–Costa Blanca	s.t.
8	Carlos Sastre (ESP)	ONCE–Deutsche Bank	+ 10' 52"
9	Massimiliano Gentili (ITA)	Cantina Tollo–Regain	+ 11' 24"
10	Wladimir Belli (ITA)	Fassa Bortolo	+ 12' 17"

== Stage 21 ==
17 September 2000 — Madrid to Madrid, 38 km (24 mi) (ITT)

Stage 21 result

Rank	Rider	Team	Time
1	Santos González (ESP)	ONCE–Deutsche Bank	45' 26"
2	Ángel Casero (ESP)	Festina	+ 6"
3	Abraham Olano (ESP)	ONCE–Deutsche Bank	+ 1' 01"
4	Serhiy Honchar (UKR)	Liquigas–Pata	+ 1' 05"
5	Pavel Tonkov (RUS)	Mapei–Quick-Step	+ 1' 19"
6	Rafael Díaz Justo (ESP)	ONCE–Deutsche Bank	+ 1' 28"
7	José Enrique Gutiérrez (ESP)	Kelme–Costa Blanca	+ 1' 50"
8	Martin Hvastija (SLO)	Alessio	+ 1' 59"
9	Roberto Heras (ESP)	Kelme–Costa Blanca	s.t.
10	Roberto Laiseka (ESP)	Euskaltel–Euskadi	+ 2' 03"

General classification after stage 21

Rank	Rider	Team	Time
1	Roberto Heras (ESP)	Kelme–Costa Blanca	70h 26' 14"
2	Ángel Casero (ESP)	Festina	+ 2' 33"
3	Pavel Tonkov (RUS)	Mapei–Quick-Step	+ 4' 55"
4	Santos González (ESP)	ONCE–Deutsche Bank	+ 5' 52"
5	Raimondas Rumšas (LTU)	Fassa Bortolo	+ 7' 38"
6	Roberto Laiseka (ESP)	Euskaltel–Euskadi	+ 10' 16"
7	Fernando Escartín (ESP)	Kelme–Costa Blanca	+ 11' 17"
8	Carlos Sastre (ESP)	ONCE–Deutsche Bank	+ 12' 16"
9	Massimiliano Gentili (ITA)	Cantina Tollo–Regain	+ 13' 10"
10	Haimar Zubeldia (ESP)	Euskaltel–Euskadi	+ 13' 14"
