= List of teams and cyclists in the 2001 Tour de France =

List of cyclists

For the 2001 Tour de France, the organisers felt that the previous edition did not include not enough French teams and consequently changed the selection procedure as follows. U.S. Postal Service was selected because it included the winner (prior to disqualification) of the previous edition, Lance Armstrong. Team Telekom was selected because it included the winner of the 2000 UCI Road World Cup (Erik Zabel). Mapei–Quick-Step was selected because it won the team classifications in the 2000 Giro d'Italia Kelme–Costa Blanca was selected because it won the team classifications in both the 2000 Tour de France and 2000 Vuelta a España. This was extended to 16 teams based on the UCI ranking in the highest UCI division at the end of 2001, after compensating for transfers. Although initially it was announced that four wildcards would be given, the tour organisation decided to add five teams:

In total, 21 teams participated, each with 9 cyclists, giving a total of 189 cyclists.

== Teams ==
Qualified teams

- U.S. Postal Service
- Team Telekom
- Mapei–Quick-Step
- Kelme–Costa Blanca
- Domo–Farm Frites–Latexco
- iBanesto.com
- ONCE–Eroski
- AG2R Prévoyance
- Bonjour
- Cofidis
- Crédit Agricole
- Festina
- Jean Delatour
- Fassa Bortolo
- Lampre–Daikin
- Rabobank

Invited teams

- Lotto–Adecco
- CSC–Tiscali
- Euskaltel–Euskadi
- Française des Jeux
- BigMat–Auber 93

== Cyclists ==
=== By starting number ===
Legend
No.	Starting number worn by the rider during the Tour
Pos.	Position in the general classification
DNF	Denotes a rider who did not finish

No.	Name	Nationality	Team	Pos.	Ref
~~1~~	~~Lance Armstrong~~	~~United States~~	~~U.S. Postal Service~~	~~1~~	
2	Roberto Heras	Spain	U.S. Postal Service	15	
3	Viatcheslav Ekimov	Russia	U.S. Postal Service	82	
4	Tyler Hamilton	United States	U.S. Postal Service	94	
5	George Hincapie	United States	U.S. Postal Service	71	
6	Steffen Kjærgaard	Norway	U.S. Postal Service	101	
7	Víctor Hugo Peña	Colombia	U.S. Postal Service	79	
8	José Luis Rubiera	Spain	U.S. Postal Service	38	
9	Christian Vande Velde	United States	U.S. Postal Service	DNF	
11	Jan Ullrich	Germany	Team Telekom	2	
12	Udo Bölts	Germany	Team Telekom	51	
13	Giuseppe Guerini	Italy	Team Telekom	39	
14	Jens Heppner	Germany	Team Telekom	DNF	
15	Andreas Klöden	Germany	Team Telekom	26	
16	Kevin Livingston	United States	Team Telekom	43	
17	Alexander Vinokourov	Kazakhstan	Team Telekom	16	
18	Steffen Wesemann	Germany	Team Telekom	DNF	
19	Erik Zabel	Germany	Team Telekom	96	
21	Joseba Beloki	Spain	ONCE–Eroski	3	
22	Santos González	Spain	ONCE–Eroski	DNF	
23	Álvaro González de Galdeano	Spain	ONCE–Eroski	DNF	
24	Igor González de Galdeano	Spain	ONCE–Eroski	5	
25	Iván Gutiérrez	Spain	ONCE–Eroski	64	
26	Jörg Jaksche	Germany	ONCE–Eroski	29	
27	Mikel Pradera	Spain	ONCE–Eroski	62	
28	Carlos Sastre	Spain	ONCE–Eroski	20	
29	Marcos-Antonio Serrano	Spain	ONCE–Eroski	9	
31	Christophe Moreau	France	Festina	DNF	
32	Florent Brard	France	Festina	100	
33	Ángel Casero	Spain	Festina	DNF	
34	Pascal Chanteur	France	Festina	114	
35	Félix García Casas	Spain	Festina	37	
36	Pascal Lino	France	Festina	87	
37	Luis Pérez Rodríguez	Spain	Festina	32	
38	Arnaud Prétot	France	Festina	DNF	
39	Sven Teutenberg	Germany	Festina	80	
41	Francesco Casagrande	Italy	Fassa Bortolo	DNF	
42	Fabio Baldato	Italy	Fassa Bortolo	81	
43	Ivan Basso	Italy	Fassa Bortolo	DNF	
44	Wladimir Belli	Italy	Fassa Bortolo	24	
45	Sergei Ivanov	Russia	Fassa Bortolo	DNF	
46	Nicola Loda	Italy	Fassa Bortolo	99	
47	Alessandro Petacchi	Italy	Fassa Bortolo	97	
48	Oscar Pozzi	Italy	Fassa Bortolo	DNF	
49	Matteo Tosatto	Italy	Fassa Bortolo	60	
51	Michael Boogerd	Netherlands	Rabobank	10	
52	Bram de Groot	Netherlands	Rabobank	DNF	
53	Steven de Jongh	Netherlands	Rabobank	DNF	
54	Erik Dekker	Netherlands	Rabobank	91	
55	Maarten den Bakker	Netherlands	Rabobank	75	
56	Marc Lotz	Netherlands	Rabobank	93	
57	Grischa Niermann	Germany	Rabobank	DNF	
58	Geert Verheyen	Belgium	Rabobank	72	
59	Marc Wauters	Belgium	Rabobank	DNF	
61	Rik Verbrugghe	Belgium	Lotto–Adecco	112	
62	Mario Aerts	Belgium	Lotto–Adecco	27	
63	Serge Baguet	Belgium	Lotto–Adecco	85	
64	Jeroen Blijlevens	Netherlands	Lotto–Adecco	DNF	
65	Fabien De Waele	Belgium	Lotto–Adecco	DNF	
66	Gennady Mikhaylov	Russia	Lotto–Adecco	59	
67	Kurt Van De Wouwer	Belgium	Lotto–Adecco	DNF	
68	Paul Van Hyfte	Belgium	Lotto–Adecco	92	
69	Stive Vermaut	Belgium	Lotto–Adecco	36	
71	David Millar	Great Britain	Cofidis	DNF	
72	Daniel Atienza	Spain	Cofidis	30	
73	Íñigo Cuesta	Spain	Cofidis	63	
74	Andrey Kivilev	Kazakhstan	Cofidis	4	
75	Massimiliano Lelli	Italy	Cofidis	67	
76	Nico Mattan	Belgium	Cofidis	98	
77	David Moncoutié	France	Cofidis	48	
78	Christophe Rinero	France	Cofidis	DNF	
79	Guido Trentin	Italy	Cofidis	45	
81	Daniele Nardello	Italy	Mapei–Quick-Step	57	
82	Michele Bartoli	Italy	Mapei–Quick-Step	33	
83	Paolo Bettini	Italy	Mapei–Quick-Step	70	
84	Davide Bramati	Italy	Mapei–Quick-Step	142	
85	Paolo Fornaciari	Italy	Mapei–Quick-Step	DNF	
86	Stefano Garzelli	Italy	Mapei–Quick-Step	14	
87	Bart Leysen	Belgium	Mapei–Quick-Step	DNF	
88	Tom Steels	Belgium	Mapei–Quick-Step	DNF	
89	Stefano Zanini	Italy	Mapei–Quick-Step	DNF	
91	Francisco Mancebo	Spain	iBanesto.com	13	
92	Santiago Blanco	Spain	iBanesto.com	DNF	
93	Tomasz Brożyna	Poland	iBanesto.com	21	
94	José Vicente García	Spain	iBanesto.com	DNF	
95	Eladio Jiménez	Spain	iBanesto.com	105	
96	Denis Menchov	Russia	iBanesto.com	47	
97	Jon Odriozola	Spain	iBanesto.com	69	
98	Javier Pascual Rodríguez	Spain	iBanesto.com	41	
99	Leonardo Piepoli	Italy	iBanesto.com	44	
101	Bobby Julich	United States	Crédit Agricole	18	
102	Frédéric Bessy	France	Crédit Agricole	119	
103	Sébastien Hinault	France	Crédit Agricole	137	
104	Thor Hushovd	Norway	Crédit Agricole	DNF	
105	Christopher Jenner	New Zealand	Crédit Agricole	139	
106	Anthony Morin	France	Crédit Agricole	107	
107	Stuart O'Grady	Australia	Crédit Agricole	54	
108	Jonathan Vaughters	United States	Crédit Agricole	DNF	
109	Jens Voigt	Germany	Crédit Agricole	46	
111	David Etxebarria	Spain	Euskaltel–Euskadi	34	
112	Ángel Castresana	Spain	Euskaltel–Euskadi	103	
113	Iñigo Chaurreau	Spain	Euskaltel–Euskadi	12	
114	Txema del Olmo	Spain	Euskaltel–Euskadi	DNF	
115	Unai Etxebarria	Venezuela	Euskaltel–Euskadi	88	
116	Iker Flores	Spain	Euskaltel–Euskadi	DNF	
117	Roberto Laiseka	Spain	Euskaltel–Euskadi	28	
118	Alberto López de Munain	Spain	Euskaltel–Euskadi	77	
119	Haimar Zubeldia	Spain	Euskaltel–Euskadi	73	
121	Benoît Salmon	France	AG2R Prévoyance	35	
122	Christophe Agnolutto	France	AG2R Prévoyance	120	
123	Stéphane Bergès	France	AG2R Prévoyance	135	
124	Alexander Bocharov	Russia	AG2R Prévoyance	17	
125	Ludovic Capelle	Belgium	AG2R Prévoyance	DNF	
126	Sébastien Demarbaix	Belgium	AG2R Prévoyance	108	
127	Jaan Kirsipuu	Estonia	AG2R Prévoyance	DNF	
128	Gilles Maignan	France	AG2R Prévoyance	121	
129	Ludovic Turpin	France	AG2R Prévoyance	78	
131	Laurent Jalabert	France	CSC–Tiscali	19	
132	Michael Blaudzun	Denmark	CSC–Tiscali	84	
133	Francisco Cerezo	Spain	CSC–Tiscali	118	
134	Marcelino García	Spain	CSC–Tiscali	122	
135	Nicolas Jalabert	France	CSC–Tiscali	115	
136	Nicolaj Bo Larsen	Denmark	CSC–Tiscali	DNF	
137	Jakob Piil	Denmark	CSC–Tiscali	117	
138	Nicki Sørensen	Denmark	CSC–Tiscali	49	
139	Rolf Sørensen	Denmark	CSC–Tiscali	141	
141	Laurent Brochard	France	Jean Delatour	23	
142	Jérôme Bernard	France	Jean Delatour	106	
143	Gilles Bouvard	France	Jean Delatour	53	
144	Stéphane Goubert	France	Jean Delatour	31	
145	Patrice Halgand	France	Jean Delatour	55	
146	Christophe Oriol	France	Jean Delatour	111	
147	Laurent Roux	France	Jean Delatour	50	
148	Eddy Seigneur	France	Jean Delatour	95	
149	Olivier Trastour	France	Jean Delatour	DNF	
151	Santiago Botero	Colombia	Kelme–Costa Blanca	8	
152	Félix Cárdenas	Colombia	Kelme–Costa Blanca	61	
153	Laurent Desbiens	France	Kelme–Costa Blanca	DNF	
154	Aitor González	Spain	Kelme–Costa Blanca	DNF	
155	José Enrique Gutiérrez	Spain	Kelme–Costa Blanca	25	
156	Javier Pascual Llorente	Spain	Kelme–Costa Blanca	58	
157	Óscar Sevilla	Spain	Kelme–Costa Blanca	7	
158	Antonio Tauler	Spain	Kelme–Costa Blanca	76	
159	José Ángel Vidal	Spain	Kelme–Costa Blanca	86	
161	Didier Rous	France	Bonjour	11	
162	Walter Bénéteau	France	Bonjour	42	
163	Franck Bouyer	France	Bonjour	74	
164	Sylvain Chavanel	France	Bonjour	65	
165	Damien Nazon	France	Bonjour	109	
166	Olivier Perraudeau	France	Bonjour	138	
167	Franck Rénier	France	Bonjour	116	
168	Jean-Cyril Robin	France	Bonjour	56	
169	François Simon	France	Bonjour	6	
171	Marco Serpellini	Italy	Lampre–Daikin	125	
172	Raivis Belohvoščiks	Latvia	Lampre–Daikin	110	
173	Rubens Bertogliati	Switzerland	Lampre–Daikin	140	
174	Ludo Dierckxsens	Belgium	Lampre–Daikin	DNF	
175	Matteo Frutti	Italy	Lampre–Daikin	128	
176	Robert Hunter	South Africa	Lampre–Daikin	DNF	
177	Marco Pinotti	Italy	Lampre–Daikin	52	
178	Ján Svorada	Czech Republic	Lampre–Daikin	129	
179	Johan Verstrepen	Belgium	Lampre–Daikin	130	
181	Sven Montgomery	Switzerland	Française des Jeux	DNF	
182	Jimmy Casper	France	Française des Jeux	144	
183	Jacky Durand	France	Française des Jeux	127	
184	Frédéric Guesdon	France	Française des Jeux	124	
185	Emmanuel Magnien	France	Française des Jeux	113	
186	Bradley McGee	Australia	Française des Jeux	83	
187	Christophe Mengin	France	Française des Jeux	102	
188	Daniel Schnider	Switzerland	Française des Jeux	66	
189	Nicolas Vogondy	France	Française des Jeux	89	
191	Romāns Vainšteins	Latvia	Domo–Farm Frites–Latexco	132	
192	Enrico Cassani	Italy	Domo–Farm Frites–Latexco	143	
193	Servais Knaven	Netherlands	Domo–Farm Frites–Latexco	90	
194	Axel Merckx	Belgium	Domo–Farm Frites–Latexco	22	
195	Marco Milesi	Italy	Domo–Farm Frites–Latexco	DNF	
196	Johan Museeuw	Belgium	Domo–Farm Frites–Latexco	DNF	
197	Fred Rodriguez	United States	Domo–Farm Frites–Latexco	DNF	
198	Max van Heeswijk	Netherlands	Domo–Farm Frites–Latexco	134	
199	Piotr Wadecki	Poland	Domo–Farm Frites–Latexco	68	
201	Stéphane Heulot	France	BigMat–Auber 93	40	
202	Guillaume Auger	France	BigMat–Auber 93	136	
203	Ludovic Auger	France	BigMat–Auber 93	133	
204	Christophe Capelle	France	BigMat–Auber 93	123	
205	Thierry Gouvenou	France	BigMat–Auber 93	131	
206	Xavier Jan	France	BigMat–Auber 93	DNF	
207	Loïc Lamouller	France	BigMat–Auber 93	DNF	
208	Alexei Sivakov	Russia	BigMat–Auber 93	104	
209	Sébastien Talabardon	France	BigMat–Auber 93	126	

=== By team ===
U.S. Postal Service
No.	Rider	Pos.
~~1~~	~~Lance Armstrong (USA)~~	~~1~~
2	Roberto Heras (ESP)	15
3	Viatcheslav Ekimov (RUS)	82
4	Tyler Hamilton (USA)	94
5	George Hincapie (USA)	71
6	Steffen Kjærgaard (NOR)	101
7	Víctor Hugo Peña (COL)	79
8	José Luis Rubiera (ESP)	38
9	Christian Vande Velde (USA)	DNF

Team Telekom
No.	Rider	Pos.
11	Jan Ullrich (GER)	2
12	Udo Bölts (GER)	51
13	Giuseppe Guerini (ITA)	39
14	Jens Heppner (GER)	DNF
15	Andreas Klöden (GER)	26
16	Kevin Livingston (USA)	43
17	Alexander Vinokourov (KAZ)	16
18	Steffen Wesemann (GER)	DNF
19	Erik Zabel (GER)	96

ONCE–Eroski
No.	Rider	Pos.
21	Joseba Beloki (ESP)	3
22	Santos González (ESP)	DNF
23	Álvaro González de Galdeano (ESP)	DNF
24	Igor González de Galdeano (ESP)	5
25	Iván Gutiérrez (ESP)	64
26	Jörg Jaksche (GER)	29
27	Mikel Pradera (ESP)	62
28	Carlos Sastre (ESP)	20
29	Marcos-Antonio Serrano (ESP)	9

Festina
No.	Rider	Pos.
31	Christophe Moreau (FRA)	DNF
32	Florent Brard (FRA)	100
33	Ángel Casero (ESP)	DNF
34	Pascal Chanteur (FRA)	114
35	Félix García Casas (ESP)	37
36	Pascal Lino (FRA)	87
37	Luis Pérez Rodríguez (ESP)	32
38	Arnaud Prétot (FRA)	DNF
39	Sven Teutenberg (GER)	80

Fassa Bortolo
No.	Rider	Pos.
41	Francesco Casagrande (ITA)	DNF
42	Fabio Baldato (ITA)	81
43	Ivan Basso (ITA)	DNF
44	Wladimir Belli (ITA)	24
45	Sergei Ivanov (RUS)	DNF
46	Nicola Loda (ITA)	99
47	Alessandro Petacchi (ITA)	97
48	Oscar Pozzi (ITA)	DNF
49	Matteo Tosatto (ITA)	60

Rabobank
No.	Rider	Pos.
51	Michael Boogerd (NED)	10
52	Bram de Groot (NED)	DNF
53	Steven de Jongh (NED)	DNF
54	Erik Dekker (NED)	91
55	Maarten den Bakker (NED)	75
56	Marc Lotz (NED)	93
57	Grischa Niermann (GER)	DNF
58	Geert Verheyen (BEL)	72
59	Marc Wauters (BEL)	DNF

Lotto–Adecco
No.	Rider	Pos.
61	Rik Verbrugghe (BEL)	112
62	Mario Aerts (BEL)	27
63	Serge Baguet (BEL)	85
64	Jeroen Blijlevens (NED)	DNF
65	Fabien De Waele (BEL)	DNF
66	Gennady Mikhaylov (RUS)	59
67	Kurt Van De Wouwer (BEL)	DNF
68	Paul Van Hyfte (BEL)	92
69	Stive Vermaut (BEL)	36

Cofidis
No.	Rider	Pos.
71	David Millar (GBR)	DNF
72	Daniel Atienza (ESP)	30
73	Íñigo Cuesta (ESP)	63
74	Andrey Kivilev (KAZ)	4
75	Massimiliano Lelli (ITA)	67
76	Nico Mattan (BEL)	98
77	David Moncoutié (FRA)	48
78	Christophe Rinero (FRA)	DNF
79	Guido Trentin (ITA)	45

Mapei–Quick-Step
No.	Rider	Pos.
81	Daniele Nardello (ITA)	57
82	Michele Bartoli (ITA)	33
83	Paolo Bettini (ITA)	70
84	Davide Bramati (ITA)	142
85	Paolo Fornaciari (ITA)	DNF
86	Stefano Garzelli (ITA)	14
87	Bart Leysen (BEL)	DNF
88	Tom Steels (BEL)	DNF
89	Stefano Zanini (ITA)	DNF

iBanesto.com
No.	Rider	Pos.
91	Francisco Mancebo (ESP)	13
92	Santiago Blanco (ESP)	DNF
93	Tomasz Brozyna (POL)	21
94	José Vicente García (ESP)	DNF
95	Eladio Jiménez (ESP)	105
96	Denis Menchov (RUS)	47
97	Jon Odriozola (ESP)	69
98	Javier Pascual Rodríguez (ESP)	41
99	Leonardo Piepoli (ITA)	44

Crédit Agricole
No.	Rider	Pos.
101	Bobby Julich (USA)	18
102	Frédéric Bessy (FRA)	119
103	Sébastien Hinault (FRA)	137
104	Thor Hushovd (NOR)	DNF
105	Christopher Jenner (FRA)	139
106	Anthony Morin (FRA)	107
107	Stuart O'Grady (AUS)	54
108	Jonathan Vaughters (USA)	DNF
109	Jens Voigt (GER)	46

Euskaltel–Euskadi
No.	Rider	Pos.
111	David Etxebarria (ESP)	34
112	Ángel Castresana (ESP)	103
113	Iñigo Chaurreau (ESP)	12
114	Txema del Olmo (ESP)	DNF
115	Unai Etxebarria (VEN)	88
116	Iker Flores (ESP)	DNF
117	Roberto Laiseka (ESP)	28
118	Alberto López de Munain (ESP)	77
119	Haimar Zubeldia (ESP)	73

AG2R Prévoyance
No.	Rider	Pos.
121	Benoît Salmon (FRA)	35
122	Christophe Agnolutto (FRA)	120
123	Stéphane Bergès (FRA)	135
124	Alexander Bocharov (RUS)	17
125	Ludovic Capelle (BEL)	DNF
126	Sébastien Demarbaix (BEL)	108
127	Jaan Kirsipuu (EST)	DNF
128	Gilles Maignan (FRA)	121
129	Ludovic Turpin (FRA)	78

CSC–Tiscali
No.	Rider	Pos.
131	Laurent Jalabert (FRA)	19
132	Michael Blaudzun (DEN)	84
133	Francisco Cerezo (ESP)	118
134	Marcelino García (ESP)	122
135	Nicolas Jalabert (FRA)	115
136	Nicolaj Bo Larsen (DEN)	DNF
137	Jakob Piil (DEN)	117
138	Nicki Sørensen (DEN)	49
139	Rolf Sørensen (DEN)	141

Jean Delatour
No.	Rider	Pos.
141	Laurent Brochard (FRA)	23
142	Jérôme Bernard (FRA)	106
143	Gilles Bouvard (FRA)	53
144	Stéphane Goubert (FRA)	31
145	Patrice Halgand (FRA)	55
146	Christophe Oriol (FRA)	111
147	Laurent Roux (FRA)	50
148	Eddy Seigneur (FRA)	95
149	Olivier Trastour (FRA)	DNF

Kelme–Costa Blanca
No.	Rider	Pos.
151	Santiago Botero (COL)	8
152	Félix Cárdenas (COL)	61
153	Laurent Desbiens (FRA)	DNF
154	Aitor González (ESP)	DNF
155	José Enrique Gutiérrez (ESP)	25
156	Javier Pascual Llorente (ESP)	58
157	Óscar Sevilla (ESP)	7
158	Antonio Tauler (ESP)	76
159	José Ángel Vidal (ESP)	86

Bonjour
No.	Rider	Pos.
161	Didier Rous (FRA)	11
162	Walter Bénéteau (FRA)	42
163	Franck Bouyer (FRA)	74
164	Sylvain Chavanel (FRA)	65
165	Damien Nazon (FRA)	109
166	Olivier Perraudeau (FRA)	138
167	Franck Rénier (FRA)	116
168	Jean-Cyril Robin (FRA)	56
169	François Simon (FRA)	6

Lampre–Daikin
No.	Rider	Pos.
171	Marco Serpellini (ITA)	125
172	Raivis Belohvošciks (LAT)	110
173	Rubens Bertogliati (SUI)	140
174	Ludo Dierckxsens (BEL)	DNF
175	Matteo Frutti (ITA)	128
176	Robert Hunter (RSA)	DNF
177	Marco Pinotti (ITA)	52
178	Ján Svorada (CZE)	129
179	Johan Verstrepen (BEL)	130

Française des Jeux
No.	Rider	Pos.
181	Sven Montgomery (SUI)	DNF
182	Jimmy Casper (FRA)	144
183	Jacky Durand (FRA)	127
184	Frédéric Guesdon (FRA)	124
185	Emmanuel Magnien (FRA)	113
186	Bradley McGee (AUS)	83
187	Christophe Mengin (FRA)	102
188	Daniel Schnider (SUI)	66
189	Nicolas Vogondy (FRA)	89

Domo–Farm Frites–Latexco
No.	Rider	Pos.
191	Romans Vainšteins (LAT)	132
192	Enrico Cassani (ITA)	143
193	Servais Knaven (NED)	90
194	Axel Merckx (BEL)	22
195	Marco Milesi (ITA)	DNF
196	Johan Museeuw (BEL)	DNF
197	Fred Rodriguez (USA)	DNF
198	Max van Heeswijk (NED)	134
199	Piotr Wadecki (POL)	68

BigMat–Auber 93
No.	Rider	Pos.
201	Stéphane Heulot (FRA)	40
202	Guillaume Auger (FRA)	136
203	Ludovic Auger (FRA)	133
204	Christophe Capelle (FRA)	123
205	Thierry Gouvenou (FRA)	131
206	Xavier Jan (FRA)	DNF
207	Loïc Lamouller (FRA)	DNF
208	Alexei Sivakov (RUS)	104
209	Sébastien Talabardon (FRA)	126
