= List of teams and cyclists in the 1997 Vuelta a España =

For the 1997 Vuelta a España, the field consisted of 198 riders; 125 finished the race.

== By rider ==
Legend
No.	Starting number worn by the rider during the Vuelta
Pos.	Position in the general classification
Time	Deficit to the winner of the general classification
DNF	Denotes a rider who did not finish

No.	Name	Nationality	Team	Pos.	Time	Ref
1	Alex Zülle	Switzerland	ONCE	1	91h 15' 55"	
2	Íñigo Cuesta	Spain	ONCE	60	+ 1h 45' 50"	
3	Herminio Díaz Zabala	Spain	ONCE	68	+ 1h 59' 50"	
4	Aitor Garmendia	Spain	ONCE	121	+ 3h 29' 10"	
5	Laurent Jalabert	France	ONCE	7	+ 10' 03"	
6	Alberto Leanizbarrutia	Spain	ONCE	37	+ 57' 04"	
7	Francisco Javier Mauleón	Spain	ONCE	67	+ 1h 59' 49"	
8	Melcior Mauri	Spain	ONCE	22	+ 35' 42"	
9	Mikel Zarrabeitia	Spain	ONCE	40	+ 1h 02' 04"	
11	Serhiy Honchar	Ukraine	Aki–Safi	56	+ 1h 39' 25"	
12	Oscar Dalla Costa	Italy	Aki–Safi	114	+ 3h 09' 47"	
13	Gianluca Gorini	Italy	Aki–Safi	66	+ 1h 57' 04"	
14	Endrio Leoni	Italy	Aki–Safi	DNF	—	
15	Nicola Miceli	Italy	Aki–Safi	DNF	—	
16	Luca Pavanello	Italy	Aki–Safi	DNF	—	
17	Marco Zanotti	Italy	Aki–Safi	DNF	—	
18	Mauro Radaelli	Italy	Aki–Safi	99	+ 2h 52' 25"	
19	Mauro Zanetti	Italy	Aki–Safi	104	+ 2h 57' 06"	
21	Claudio Chiappucci	Italy	Asics–CGA	11	+ 16' 22"	
22	Federico Colonna	Italy	Asics–CGA	DNF	—	
23	Diego Ferrari	Italy	Asics–CGA	101	+ 2h 56' 38"	
24	Andrea Noè	Italy	Asics–CGA	52	+ 1h 24' 33"	
25	Fabio Roscioli	Italy	Asics–CGA	107	+ 2h 59' 49"	
26	Samuele Schiavina	Italy	Asics–CGA	102	+ 2h 57' 01"	
27	Alexandr Shefer	Kazakhstan	Asics–CGA	DNF	—	
28	Filippo Simeoni	Italy	Asics–CGA	69	+ 2h 03' 23"	
29	Enrico Zaina	Italy	Asics–CGA	4	+ 7' 24"	
31	Abraham Olano	Spain	Banesto	DNF	—	
32	Marino Alonso	Spain	Banesto	35	+ 56' 31"	
33	Ángel Casero	Spain	Banesto	DNF	—	
34	Armand de Las Cuevas	France	Banesto	DNF	—	
35	José Vicente García	Spain	Banesto	62	+ 1h 47' 09"	
36	Prudencio Induráin	Spain	Banesto	44	+ 1h 04' 17"	
37	José María Jiménez	Spain	Banesto	21	+ 34' 08"	
38	Aitor Osa	Spain	Banesto	46	+ 1h 10' 53"	
39	Orlando Rodrigues	Portugal	Banesto	DNF	—	
41	Wladimir Belli	Italy	Brescialat–Oyster	DNF	—	
42	Claudio Camin	Italy	Brescialat–Oyster	90	+ 2h 44' 27"	
43	Marco Della Vedova	Italy	Brescialat–Oyster	DNF	—	
44	Luca Gelfi	Italy	Brescialat–Oyster	87	+ 2h 35' 29"	
45	Marco Milesi	Italy	Brescialat–Oyster	79	+ 2h 20' 48"	
46	Mariano Piccoli	Italy	Brescialat–Oyster	48	+ 1h 13' 58"	
47	Giancarlo Raimondi	Italy	Brescialat–Oyster	DNF	—	
48	Marco Serpellini	Italy	Brescialat–Oyster	16	+ 22' 11"	
49	Roberto Sgambelluri	Italy	Brescialat–Oyster	DNF	—	
51	Massimiliano Gentili	Italy	Cantina Tollo–Carrier–Starplast	29	+ 46' 09"	
52	Stefano Cembali	Italy	Cantina Tollo–Carrier–Starplast	125	+ 3h 59' 05"	
53	Stefano Dante	Italy	Cantina Tollo–Carrier–Starplast	DNF	—	
54	Marco Antonio Di Renzo	Italy	Cantina Tollo–Carrier–Starplast	DNF	—	
55	Andrea Dolci	Italy	Cantina Tollo–Carrier–Starplast	DNF	—	
56	Martin Hvastija	Slovenia	Cantina Tollo–Carrier–Starplast	110	+ 3h 02' 02"	
57	Nicola Ramacciotti	Italy	Cantina Tollo–Carrier–Starplast	117	+ 3h 14' 34"	
58	Andrea Paluan	Italy	Cantina Tollo–Carrier–Starplast	100	+ 2h 54' 41"	
59	Maurizio Frizzo	Italy	Cantina Tollo–Carrier–Starplast	122	+ 3h 31' 35"	
61	Pascal Richard	Switzerland	Casino	34	+ 55' 34"	
62	Stéphane Barthe	France	Casino	DNF	—	
63	Frédéric Bessy	France	Casino	70	+ 2h 03' 51"	
64	Philippe Bordenave	France	Casino	12	+ 18' 21"	
65	Jacky Durand	France	Casino	116	+ 3h 14' 34"	
66	Fabrice Gougot	France	Casino	DNF	—	
67	Pascal Chanteur	France	Casino	DNF	—	
68	Rodolfo Massi	Italy	Casino	20	+ 31' 59"	
69	Frédéric Pontier	France	Casino	DNF	—	
71	Tony Rominger	Switzerland	Cofidis	38	+ 59' 41"	
72	Frankie Andreu	United States	Cofidis	DNF	—	
73	Laurent Desbiens	France	Cofidis	DNF	—	
74	Maurizio Fondriest	Italy	Cofidis	49	+ 1h 14' 35"	
75	Philippe Gaumont	France	Cofidis	DNF	—	
76	Francis Moreau	France	Cofidis	91	+ 2h 44' 54"	
77	David Plaza	Spain	Cofidis	36	+ 56' 35"	
78	Christophe Rinero	France	Cofidis	DNF	—	
79	Bruno Thibout	France	Cofidis	30	+ 48' 18"	
81	Daniel Clavero	Spain	Estepona en Marcha–Cafés Toscaf	6	+ 10' 02"	
82	Eleuterio Anguita	Spain	Estepona en Marcha–Cafés Toscaf	DNF	—	
83	Francisco Cerezo	Spain	Estepona en Marcha–Cafés Toscaf	32	+ 52' 20"	
84	Andrei Zintchenko	Russia	Estepona en Marcha–Cafés Toscaf	119	+ 3h 18' 33"	
85	Claus Michael Møller	Denmark	Estepona en Marcha–Cafés Toscaf	DNF	—	
86	Victor Moratilla Solera	Spain	Estepona en Marcha–Cafés Toscaf	74	+ 2h 11' 41"	
87	Serguei Smetanine	Russia	Estepona en Marcha–Cafés Toscaf	DNF	—	
88	José Manuel Uría	Spain	Estepona en Marcha–Cafés Toscaf	14	+ 19' 42"	
89	Juan Carlos Vicario Barberá	Spain	Estepona en Marcha–Cafés Toscaf	80	+ 2h 21' 05"	
91	César Solaun	Spain	Equipo Euskadi	DNF	—	
92	Iñaki Ayarzaguena Urkidi	Spain	Equipo Euskadi	31	+ 48' 34"	
93	Ibon Ajuria	Spain	Equipo Euskadi	27	+ 41' 24"	
94	David García Marquina	Spain	Equipo Euskadi	63	+ 1h 49' 21"	
95	Iñigo González de Heredia	Spain	Equipo Euskadi	DNF	—	
96	Álvaro González de Galdeano	Spain	Equipo Euskadi	DNF	—	
97	Igor González de Galdeano	Spain	Equipo Euskadi	42	+ 1h 03' 01"	
98	Roberto Laiseka	Spain	Equipo Euskadi	54	+ 1h 29' 19"	
99	Óscar López Uriarte	Spain	Equipo Euskadi	50	+ 1h 19' 01"	
101	Chris Boardman	Great Britain	GAN	DNF	—	
102	Emmanuel Hubert	France	GAN	DNF	—	
103	Yvon Ledanois	France	GAN	10	+ 15' 40"	
104	Frédéric Moncassin	France	GAN	DNF	—	
105	Eros Poli	Italy	GAN	DNF	—	
106	Gérard Rué	France	GAN	88	+ 2h 38' 20"	
107	François Simon	France	GAN	DNF	—	
108	Francisque Teyssier	France	GAN	23	+ 36' 06"	
109	Cédric Vasseur	France	GAN	45	+ 1h 08' 01"	
111	Fernando Escartín	Spain	Kelme–Costa Blanca	2	+ 5' 07"	
112	Santiago Botero	Colombia	Kelme–Costa Blanca	98	+ 2h 50' 40"	
113	Juan Carlos Domínguez	Spain	Kelme–Costa Blanca	18	+ 31' 23"	
114	Ángel Edo	Spain	Kelme–Costa Blanca	DNF	—	
115	Arsenio González	Spain	Kelme–Costa Blanca	47	+ 1h 11' 41"	
116	Roberto Heras	Spain	Kelme–Costa Blanca	5	+ 8' 04"	
117	José Rodríguez	Spain	Kelme–Costa Blanca	58	+ 1h 42' 50"	
118	Santos González	Spain	Kelme–Costa Blanca	DNF	—	
119	Marcos-Antonio Serrano	Spain	Kelme–Costa Blanca	8	+ 10' 40"	
121	Laurent Dufaux	Switzerland	Festina–Lotus	3	+ 6' 11"	
122	Laurent Brochard	France	Festina–Lotus	19	+ 31' 51"	
123	Félix García Casas	Spain	Festina–Lotus	13	+ 18' 47"	
124	Pascal Hervé	France	Festina–Lotus	43	+ 1h 03' 10"	
125	Fabian Jeker	Switzerland	Festina–Lotus	25	+ 38' 03"	
126	Valerio Tebaldi	Italy	Festina–Lotus	85	+ 2h 34' 02"	
127	Didier Rous	France	Festina–Lotus	DNF	—	
128	Neil Stephens	Australia	Festina–Lotus	55	+ 1h 34' 44"	
129	Marcel Wüst	Germany	Festina–Lotus	109	+ 3h 01' 01"	
131	Cândido Barbosa	Portugal	Maia-CIN	DNF	—	
132	Joaquim Andrade	Portugal	Maia-CIN	DNF	—	
133	José Azevedo	Portugal	Maia-CIN	DNF	—	
134	Paulo Barroso	Portugal	Maia-CIN	DNF	—	
135	José Luis Sánchez	Spain	Maia-CIN	DNF	—	
136	Paulo Ferreira	Portugal	Maia-CIN	DNF	—	
137	José Francisco Jarque	Spain	Maia-CIN	DNF	—	
138	Joaquim Sampaio	Portugal	Maia-CIN	DNF	—	
139	João Silva	Portugal	Maia-CIN	DNF	—	
141	Pavel Tonkov	Russia	Mapei–GB	DNF	—	
142	Franco Ballerini	Italy	Mapei–GB	97	+ 2h 50' 29"	
143	Davide Bramati	Italy	Mapei–GB	105	+ 2h 58' 31"	
144	Gianni Bugno	Italy	Mapei–GB	95	+ 2h 47' 00"	
145	Gianni Faresin	Italy	Mapei–GB	9	+ 13' 53"	
146	Paolo Lanfranchi	Italy	Mapei–GB	17	+ 30' 35"	
147	Daniele Nardello	Italy	Mapei–GB	DNF	—	
148	Ján Svorada	Czech Republic	Mapei–GB	120	+ 3h 20' 14"	
149	Stefano Zanini	Italy	Mapei–GB	DNF	—	
151	Peter Luttenberger	Austria	Rabobank	DNF	—	
152	Danny Jonasson	Denmark	Rabobank	112	+ 3h 09' 18"	
153	Patrick Jonker	Australia	Rabobank	73	+ 2h 06' 45"	
154	Jans Koerts	Netherlands	Rabobank	DNF	—	
155	Koos Moerenhout	Netherlands	Rabobank	65	+ 1h 53' 01"	
156	Danny Nelissen	Netherlands	Rabobank	94	+ 2h 46' 45"	
157	Léon van Bon	Netherlands	Rabobank	77	+ 2h 19' 27"	
158	Max van Heeswijk	Netherlands	Rabobank	83	+ 2h 25' 42"	
159	Aart Vierhouten	Netherlands	Rabobank	89	+ 2h 42' 30"	
161	Stefano Colagè	Italy	Refin–Mobilvetta	53	+ 1h 28' 38"	
162	Elio Aggiano	Italy	Refin–Mobilvetta	123	+ 3h 34' 13"	
163	Gabriele Balducci	Italy	Refin–Mobilvetta	DNF	—	
164	Mauro Bettin	Italy	Refin–Mobilvetta	59	+ 1h 43' 05"	
165	Marco Lietti	Italy	Refin–Mobilvetta	93	+ 2h 46' 15"	
166	Leonardo Piepoli	Italy	Refin–Mobilvetta	26	+ 40' 12"	
167	Sergei Uslamin	Russia	Refin–Mobilvetta	86	+ 2h 35' 09"	
168	Cristian Salvato	Italy	Refin–Mobilvetta	76	+ 2h 16' 20"	
169	Jürgen Werner	Germany	Refin–Mobilvetta	103	+ 2h 57' 01"	
171	José Castelblanco	Colombia	Flavia-Telecom	41	+ 1h 02' 56"	
172	Julio César Aguirre	Colombia	Flavia-Telecom	28	+ 43' 01"	
173	Carlos Contreras Caño	Colombia	Flavia-Telecom	15	+ 20' 46"	
174	Jairo Hernández	Colombia	Flavia-Telecom	51	+ 1h 22' 30"	
175	Carlos Andrés Osorio	Colombia	Flavia-Telecom	82	+ 2h 25' 28"	
176	Federico Muñoz	Colombia	Flavia-Telecom	39	+ 59' 42"	
177	Héctor Palacio	Colombia	Flavia-Telecom	DNF	—	
178	Juan Diego Ramírez	Colombia	Flavia-Telecom	75	+ 2h 12' 08"	
179	Efraím Rico	Colombia	Flavia-Telecom	57	+ 1h 39' 27"	
181	Michael Andersson	Sweden	TVM–Farm Frites	DNF	—	
182	Stéphane Pétilleau	France	TVM–Farm Frites	DNF	—	
183	Servais Knaven	Netherlands	TVM–Farm Frites	DNF	—	
184	Bo Hamburger	Denmark	TVM–Farm Frites	33	+ 54' 21"	
185	Sergei Ivanov	Russia	TVM–Farm Frites	24	+ 37' 59"	
186	Lars Michaelsen	Denmark	TVM–Farm Frites	71	+ 2h 04' 12"	
187	Bart Voskamp	Netherlands	TVM–Farm Frites	96	+ 2h 47' 56"	
188	Jesper Skibby	Denmark	TVM–Farm Frites	DNF	—	
189	Tristan Hoffman	Netherlands	TVM–Farm Frites	DNF	—	
191	Mario Cipollini	Italy	Saeco–Estro	DNF	—	
192	Giuseppe Calcaterra	Italy	Saeco–Estro	115	+ 3h 14' 13"	
193	Angelo Canzonieri	Italy	Saeco–Estro	92	+ 2h 45' 35"	
194	Alessio Di Basco	Italy	Saeco–Estro	81	+ 2h 21' 13"	
195	Giorgio Furlan	Italy	Saeco–Estro	78	+ 2h 19' 29"	
196	Eddy Mazzoleni	Italy	Saeco–Estro	DNF	—	
197	Roberto Petito	Italy	Saeco–Estro	DNF	—	
198	Ginés Salmerón	Spain	Saeco–Estro	DNF	—	
199	Mario Scirea	Italy	Saeco–Estro	113	+ 3h 09' 18"	
201	Fabrizio Guidi	Italy	Scrigno–Gaerne	84	+ 2h 29' 10"	
202	Massimo Apollonio	Italy	Scrigno–Gaerne	106	+ 2h 59' 38"	
203	Davide Casarotto	Italy	Scrigno–Gaerne	108	+ 3h 00' 33"	
204	Biagio Conte	Italy	Scrigno–Gaerne	118	+ 3h 15' 40"	
205	Alessandro Petacchi	Italy	Scrigno–Gaerne	DNF	—	
206	Dario Pieri	Italy	Scrigno–Gaerne	DNF	—	
207	Mirko Rossato	Italy	Scrigno–Gaerne	DNF	—	
208	Amilcare Tronca	Italy	Scrigno–Gaerne	61	+ 1h 45' 56"	
209	Andrea Vatteroni	Italy	Scrigno–Gaerne	DNF	—	
211	Viatcheslav Ekimov	Russia	U.S. Postal Service	64	+ 1h 49' 39"	
212	Darren Baker	United States	U.S. Postal Service	72	+ 2h 06' 38"	
213	Anton Villatoro	Guatemala	U.S. Postal Service	DNF	—	
214	Eddy Gragus	United States	U.S. Postal Service	DNF	—	
215	Remigijus Lupeikis	Lithuania	U.S. Postal Service	124	+ 3h 40' 53"	
216	Scott Mercier	United States	U.S. Postal Service	DNF	—	
217	Peter Meinert Nielsen	Denmark	U.S. Postal Service	DNF	—	
218	Jean-Cyril Robin	France	U.S. Postal Service	DNF	—	
219	Sven Teutenberg	Germany	U.S. Postal Service	111	+ 3h 06' 01"	
