= 1998 Volta a la Comunitat Valenciana =

Race details
- Dates: 24–28 February 1998
- Stages: 5
- Distance: 853 km (530.0 mi)
- Winning time: 21h 50' 19"

Results
	Winner	Pascal Chanteur (FRA)	(Casino–Ag2r)
	Second	Bo Hamburger (DEN)	(Casino–Ag2r)
	Third	Santos González (ESP)	(Kelme–Costa Blanca)

The 1998 Volta a la Comunitat Valenciana was the 56th edition of the Volta a la Comunitat Valenciana road cycling stage race, which was held from 24 February to 28 February 1998. The race started in Calpe and finished in Valencia. The race was won by Pascal Chanteur of the Casino–Ag2r team.

== General classification ==
Final general classification

Rank	Rider	Team	Time
1	Pascal Chanteur (FRA)	Casino–Ag2r	21h 50' 19"
2	Bo Hamburger (DEN)	Casino–Ag2r	s.t.
3	Santos González (ESP)	Kelme–Costa Blanca	s.t.
4	Herminio Díaz Zabala (ESP)	ONCE	s.t.
5	Mikel Zarrabeitia (ESP)	ONCE	s.t.
6	José Luis Arrieta (ESP)	Banesto	+ 13"
7	Wladimir Belli (ITA)	Festina–Lotus	+ 20"
8	Peter Luttenberger (AUT)	Rabobank	+ 21"
9	François Simon (FRA)	GAN	+ 26"
10	Massimiliano Gentili (ITA)	Cantina Tollo–Alexia Alluminio	s.t.
