= 1996 Vuelta a Asturias =

Race details
- Dates: 14–19 May 1996
- Stages: 5
- Distance: 852.8 km (529.9 mi)
- Winning time: 22h 26' 25"

Results
Jersey awarded to the overall winner	Winner	Miguel Induráin (ESP)	(Banesto)
	Second	Fernando Escartín (ESP)	(Kelme–Artiach)
	Third	Marcelino Garcia (ESP)	(ONCE)

The 1996 Vuelta a Asturias was the 40th edition of the Vuelta a Asturias road cycling stage race, which was held from 14 May to 19 May 1996. The race started and finished in Oviedo. The race was won by Miguel Induráin of the Banesto team.

== General classification ==
Final general classification

Rank	Rider	Team	Time
1	Miguel Induráin (ESP)	Banesto	22h 26' 25"
2	Fernando Escartín (ESP)	Kelme–Artiach	+ 13"
3	Marcelino Garcia (ESP)	ONCE	+ 35"
4	Massimiliano Gentili (ITA)	Cantina Tollo–Co.Bo.	+ 52"
5	Mikel Zarrabeitia (ESP)	ONCE	+ 2' 08"
6	Santiago Blanco (ESP)	Banesto	+ 3' 38"
7	Marcos-Antonio Serrano (ESP)	Kelme–Artiach	+ 3' 45"
8	César Solaun (ESP)	Equipo Euskadi	+ 4' 34"
9	José Luis Arrieta (ESP)	Banesto	+ 5' 30"
10	David Etxebarria (ESP)	ONCE	+ 7' 01"
