= Magnano (disambiguation) =

Magnano is a comune (municipality) in the Province of Biella, Italy

Magnano may also refer to:

- Magnano in Riviera, a comune (municipality) in the Province of Udine
- Magnano (surname)
