= Magnano (surname) =

Magnano is an Italian-language occupational surname, literally meaning locksmith. Notable people with the surname include:

- Rubén Magnano (born 1954), Argentine-Italian professional basketball coach
- Solange Magnano (1971–2009), Argentine model and beauty queen

== See also ==
- Magnani
