= Magnani =

Magnani is an Italian-language occupational surname derived from the occupation of locksmith.

The surname Magnani was first found in Bologna (Latin: Bononia), the largest city and the capital of Emilia-Romagna Region. The early record shows that a bearer of Magnani was a government magistrate in 1223. In those ancient times only persons of rank, the podesta, clergy, city officials, army officers, artists, landowners were entered into the records. To be recorded at this time was in itself a family honor.

The Magnani family distinguished itself among the high-society of 1800' Florence and was listed in the "Golden books of Florentine nobility" commissioned initially by Ferdinando I de' Medici.

Important Palazzos in both Florence and Bologna among others still carry the name of the family.

Notable people with the surname include:

- Anna Magnani (1908–1973), Italian actress and Academy Award winner for best actress 1956
- Aurélio Magnani (1856–1921), Italian clarinetist
- Dante Magnani (1917–1985), American football player
- Giovanni Battista Magnani (1571–1653), Italian architect
- Giulio Magnani (1505–1565), Italian Minister General of the Friars Minor Conventual and bishop of Calvi
- Cesare Ricotti-Magnani (1822–1917), Italian general and minister of War of the Kingdom of Italy
- Franco Magnani (born 1938), Italian racing cyclist
- Giangiacomo Magnani (born 1995), Italian footballer
- Giovanni Magnani (fl. 1913), Romanian-Italian entrepreneur
- José Magnani (1913–1966), Brazilian cyclist
- Lorenzo Magnani (born 1952), Italian philosopher
- Marciano Magnani (1936–1983), Italian wrestler
- Marco Magnani (born 1969), Italian economist
- Margherita Magnani (born 1987), Italian middle-distance runner
- Massimo Magnani (born 1951), Italian marathon runner
- Miguel Alemán Magnani, president and CEO of Mexican airline Interjet
- Primo Magnani (1892–1967), Italian cyclist, Olympic gold medalist
- Roberto Magnani (born 1977), Italian footballer
- Suzane Magnani Muniz (born 1983), Brazilian murderer

== See also ==
- Palazzo Magnani, Bologna
- Palazzo Magnani Feroni
- Palazzo Magnani, Reggio Emilia
- Magnano
