= Ginés Salmerón =

Spanish cyclist

Personal information
- Born: 15 November 1972 (age 53)

Cycling career
- Sport: Cycling
- Current team: Retired
- Discipline: Road
- Role: Rider

Professional teams
- 1996–1997: Saeco–AS Juvenes San Marino
- 1998–1999: Vitalicio Seguros
- 2000: Costa de Almería

Ginés Salmerón (born 15 November 1972) is a Spanish racing cyclist. He rode in the 1999 Tour de France.

== Major results ==
1997
1st Stage 3 Vuelta a Andalucía
1998
3rd Clásica de Sabiñánigo
6th Overall Vuelta a Andalucía
1999
6th Overall Étoile de Bessèges
9th Overall Vuelta a Murcia
9th Gran Premio Miguel Induráin

=== Grand Tour general classification results timeline ===
| Grand Tour | 1997 | 1998 | 1999 | 2000 |
|---|---|---|---|---|
| Vuelta a España | DNF | — | — | DNF |
| Giro d'Italia | — | — | 93 | — |
| Tour de France | — | — | DNF | — |

Legend
| — | Did not compete |
| DNF | Did not finish |
