= 2000 Vuelta a España =

55th edition of the Vuelta a España

Race details
- Dates: 26 August - 17 September
- Stages: 21
- Distance: 2,893.6 km (1,798.0 mi)
- Winning time: 70h 26' 14"

Results
Jersey awarded to the overall winner	Winner	Roberto Heras (ESP)	(Kelme–Costa Blanca)
	Second	Ángel Casero (ESP)	(Festina)
	Third	Pavel Tonkov (RUS)	(Mapei–Quick-Step)
Jersey awarded to the points classification winner	Points	Roberto Heras (ESP)	(Kelme–Costa Blanca)
Jersey awarded to the mountains classification winner	Mountains	Carlos Sastre (ESP)	(ONCE–Deutsche Bank)
Jersey awarded to the sprints classification winner	Sprints	Gianni Faresin (ITA)	(Mapei–Quick-Step)
	Team	Kelme–Costa Blanca	

The 55th edition of the Vuelta a España ("Tour of Spain"), a long-distance bicycle stage race and one of the three grand tours, was held from 26 August to 17 September 2000. It consisted of 21 stages covering a total of 2,904 km (1,804 mi), and was won by Roberto Heras of the Kelme–Costa Blanca cycling team. The defending champion, Jan Ullrich, withdrew after the 12th stage while sitting in fourth place to prepare for the Olympic Road Race.

== Route ==
List of stages
Stage	Date	Course	Distance	Type	Winner
1	26 August	Málaga to Málaga	13.3 km (8 mi)	Individual time trial	Alex Zülle (SUI)
2	27 August	Málaga to Córdoba	167.5 km (104 mi)		Óscar Freire (ESP)
3	28 August	Montoro to Valdepeñas	198.4 km (123 mi)		Jans Koerts (NED)
4	29 August	Valdepeñas to Albacete	159 km (99 mi)		Óscar Freire (ESP)
5	30 August	Albacete to Xorret de Catí	152.3 km (95 mi)		Eladio Jiménez (ESP)
6	31 August	Benidorm to Valencia	155.5 km (97 mi)		Paolo Bossoni (ITA)
7	1 September	Valencia to Morella	175 km (109 mi)		Roberto Heras (ESP)
8	2 September	Vinaròs to Port Aventura	168.5 km (105 mi)		Alessandro Petacchi (ITA)
9	3 September	Tarragona to Tarragona	37.6 km (23 mi)	Individual time trial	Abraham Olano (ESP)
10	4 September	Sabadell to Supermolina	165.8 km (103 mi)		Félix Cárdenas (COL)
11	5 September	Alp to Arcalis (Andorra)	136.5 km (85 mi)		Roberto Laiseka (ESP)
	6 September			Rest day	
12	7 September	Zaragoza to Zaragoza	131.5 km (82 mi)		Alessandro Petacchi (ITA)
	8 September			Rest day	
13	9 September	Santander to Santander	143.3 km (89 mi)		Mariano Piccoli (ITA)
14	10 September	Santander to Lakes of Covadonga	146.5 km (91 mi)		Andrei Zintchenko (RUS)
15	11 September	Cangas de Onís to Gijón	164.2 km (102 mi)		Álvaro González de Galdeano (ESP)
16	12 September	Oviedo to Alto de l'Angliru	168 km (104 mi)		Gilberto Simoni (ITA)
17	13 September	Benavente to Salamanca	155.5 km (97 mi)		Davide Bramati (ITA)
18	14 September	Béjar to Ciudad Rodrigo	159 km (99 mi)		Alexander Vinokourov (KAZ)
19	15 September	Salamanca to Ávila	130 km (81 mi)		Mariano Piccoli (ITA)
20	16 September	Ávila to Alto de Abantos	128.2 km (80 mi)		Roberto Heras (ESP)
21	17 September	Madrid to Madrid	38 km (24 mi)	Individual time trial	Santos González (ESP)
	Total		2,904 km (1,804 mi)		

== Jersey progress ==
Stage	Winner	General classification	Points Classification	Mountains Classification	Team Classification
1 (ITT)	Alex Zülle	Alex Zülle	Alex Zülle	Carlos Sastre	Vitalicio Seguros
2	Oscar Freire	Alex Zülle	Alex Zülle	Eladio Jiménez	Vitalicio Seguros
3	Jans Koerts	Alex Zülle	Jans Koerts	Eladio Jiménez	Vitalicio Seguros
4	Oscar Freire	Alex Zülle	Oscar Freire	Eladio Jiménez	Vitalicio Seguros
5	Eladio Jiménez	Alex Zülle	Oscar Freire	Eladio Jiménez	Kelme–Costa Blanca
6	Paolo Bossoni	Alex Zülle	Oscar Freire	Eladio Jiménez	ONCE–Deutsche Bank
7	Roberto Heras	Alex Zülle	Oscar Freire	Eladio Jiménez	ONCE–Deutsche Bank
8	Alessandro Petacchi	Alex Zülle	Giovanni Lombardi	Eladio Jiménez	ONCE–Deutsche Bank
9 (ITT)	Abraham Olano	Abraham Olano	Giovanni Lombardi	Eladio Jiménez	ONCE–Deutsche Bank
10	Felix Cardenas	Santos González	Giovanni Lombardi	Felix Cardenas	ONCE–Deutsche Bank
11	Roberto Laiseka	Angel Casero	Giovanni Lombardi	Carlos Sastre	Vitalicio Seguros
12	Alessandro Petacchi	Angel Casero	Giovanni Lombardi	Carlos Sastre	Vitalicio Seguros
13	Mariano Piccoli	Angel Casero	Giovanni Lombardi	Carlos Sastre	Vitalicio Seguros
14	Andrei Zintchenko	Roberto Heras	Giovanni Lombardi	Carlos Sastre	Kelme–Costa Blanca
15	Alvaro Gonzalez de Galdeano	Roberto Heras	Giovanni Lombardi	Carlos Sastre	Vitalicio Seguros
16	Gilberto Simoni	Roberto Heras	Giovanni Lombardi	Carlos Sastre	Vitalicio Seguros
17	Davide Bramati	Roberto Heras	Giovanni Lombardi	Carlos Sastre	Vitalicio Seguros
18	Alexander Vinokourov	Roberto Heras	Giovanni Lombardi	Carlos Sastre	Vitalicio Seguros
19	Mariano Piccoli	Roberto Heras	Giovanni Lombardi	Carlos Sastre	Vitalicio Seguros
20	Roberto Heras	Roberto Heras	Roberto Heras	Carlos Sastre	Kelme–Costa Blanca
21 (ITT)	Santos González	Roberto Heras	Roberto Heras	Carlos Sastre	Kelme–Costa Blanca
Stage	Winner	Roberto Heras	Roberto Heras	Carlos Sastre	Kelme–Costa Blanca

== Final standings ==
Rank	Rider	Team	Time
1	(Spain) Roberto Heras	Kelme–Costa Blanca	70:26:14
2	(Spain) Ángel Casero	Festina	2:33
3	(Russia) Pavel Tonkov	Mapei–Quick-Step	4:55
4	(Spain) Santos González	ONCE–Deutsche Bank	5:52
5	(Lithuania) Raimondas Rumšas	Fassa Bortolo	7:38
6	(Spain) Roberto Laiseka	Euskaltel–Euskadi	10:16
7	(Spain) Fernando Escartín	Kelme–Costa Blanca	11:17
8	(Spain) Carlos Sastre	ONCE–Deutsche Bank	12:16
9	(Italy) Massimiliano Gentili	Cantina Tollo–Regain	13:10
10	(Spain) Haimar Zubeldia	Euskaltel–Euskadi	13:14
11	(Spain) José Luis Rubiera	Kelme–Costa Blanca	13:16
12	(Italy) Wladimir Belli	Fassa Bortolo	13:44
13	(Spain) Santiago Blanco	Vitalicio Seguros	15:41
14	(Spain) Óscar Sevilla	Kelme–Costa Blanca	16:37
15	(Spain) Txema del Olmo	Euskaltel–Euskadi	19:24
16	(France) Richard Virenque	Team Polti	20:28
17	(France) Pascal Hervé	Team Polti	23:43
18	(Spain) Francisco García Rodríguez	Vitalicio Seguros	24:51
19	(Spain) Abraham Olano	ONCE–Deutsche Bank	25:19
20	(Italy) Gianni Faresin	Mapei–Quick-Step	25:36
21	(Spain) Félix García Casas	Festina	26:25
22	(Switzerland) Oscar Camenzind	Lampre–Daikin	29:01
23	(Italy) Marco Magnani	Alessio	30:03
24	(Spain) Eladio Jiménez	Banesto	31:47
25	(Switzerland) Fabian Jeker	Festina	39:32
