= Matteo Frutti =

Italian cyclist

Personal information
- Born: 29 January 1975 (age 51) Trescore Balneario, Italy

Cycling career
- Sport: Cycling
- Current team: Retired
- Discipline: Road
- Role: Rider

Amateur team
- 1995: Polti–Granarolo–Santini (stagiaire)

Professional teams
- 1998: Mapei–Bricobi
- 1999–2002: Lampre–Daikin

Matteo Frutti (born 29 January 1975) is an Italian former professional road racing cyclist.

== Major results ==
1993
1st Stage 3 Grand Prix Rüebliland
1995
3rd Circuito del Porto
1997
1st Coppa San Geo
1st Stage 2 Giro della Valle d'Aosta
1st Stage 8 Girobio
2nd Trofeo Franco Balestra
2001
3rd Tour Beneden-Maas
10th Paris–Bruxelles

=== Grand Tour general classification results timeline ===
Grand Tour	1999	2000	2001
Giro d'Italia	95	—	—
Tour de France	—	—	128
Vuelta a España	—	DNF	—

Legend
—	Did not compete
DNF	Did not finish
