= Leonardo Guidi =

Italian cyclist

Personal information
- Born: 20 March 1974 (age 52)

Cycling career
- Sport: Cycling
- Role: Rider

Leonardo Guidi (born 20 March 1974) is an Italian racing cyclist. He rode in the 1998 Tour de France.
