= Paolo Bossoni =

Italian cyclist

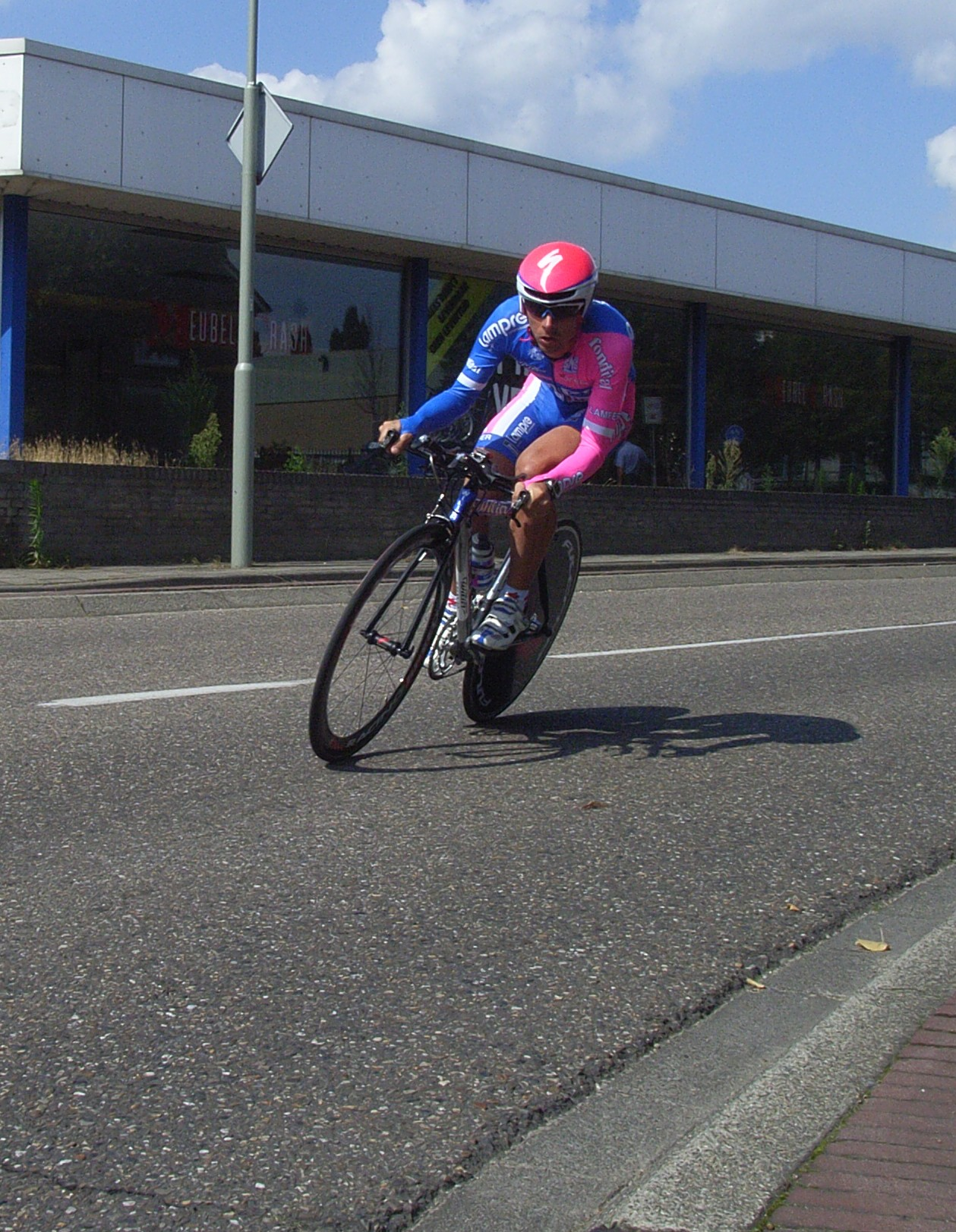

Personal information
- Full name: Paolo Bossoni
- Nickname: Boss
- Born: 2 July 1976 (age 50) San Secondo Parmense, Italy
- Height: 1.73 m (5 ft 8 in)
- Weight: 62 kg (137 lb)

Cycling career
- Sport: Cycling
- Discipline: Road
- Role: Rider

Professional teams
- 1999–2000: Cantina Tollo–Alexia Alluminio
- 2001–2003: Tacconi Sport–Vini Caldirola
- 2004: Lampre
- 2005: Fassa Bortolo
- 2006: Tenax
- 2007–2008: Lampre–Fondital

Major wins
- Vuelta a España, 1 stage

Paolo Bossoni (born 2 July 1976 in San Secondo Parmense) is an Italian professional road bicycle racer.

== Doping ==
Bossoni tested positive for EPO at the 2008 Italian cycling championships and was subsequently handed a two-year ban from sport.

== Major results ==
- 2nd, National Road Race Championship (2007)
  - 3rd (2004)
- Trofeo Citta' di Castelfidardo (2006)
- Coppa Sabatini (2003)
- Gran Premio Industria e Commercio Artigianato Carnaghese (2002)
- Giro del Lago Maggiore (2001)
- Brixia Tour – 1 stage (2001)
- 2000 Vuelta a España – 1 stage
