= Marco Magnani =

Italian economist

- Born: 1969 (age 56–57)

Academic background
- Education: University of Rome La Sapienza and Columbia University

Marco Magnani (born 1969) is an Italian economist.

== Biography ==
=== Education and career ===
At 16 he was an AFS scholar, lived for a year in the United States and gained a US High School diploma.

He has a degree in economics from the University of Rome La Sapienza and the College of Cavalieri del Lavoro in Rome. He is a Jona scholar and gained a Master in Business Administration and Finance at Columbia University.

He also completed executives programs in leadership and public policies at the Harvard Kennedy School, at the Jackson Institute for Global Affairs of Yale University and at the Lee Kuan Yew School of Public Policy of Singapore

He has 20 years of professional experience, primarily in investment banking in New York City with JP Morgan and in Milan with Mediobanca. He is a member of the Global Agenda Council on Banking and Capital Markets.

Since 2011 he has led the research project Italy 2030 at the John F. Kennedy School of Government at Harvard University, as a Senior Research Fellow in political economy. He is affiliated with the School of Advanced International Studies of the Johns Hopkins University in Washington, DC.

He currently teaches International Economics at University LUISS Guido Carli in Rome and at Università Cattolica del Sacro Cuore in Milan. He also teaches executive courses at LUISS Business School, Luiss School of Government, Graduate School of Manament del Politecnico di Milano, ASP-Alta Scuola Politecnica (top 1% students of Politecnico of Milano and Torino).

In 2010 he was appointed Young Global Leader of the World Economic Forum of Davos. In 2011 he was elected Chairman of Intercultura, the Italian partner of American Field Service. He is an elected member of the Board of Trustees of American Field Service International Programs. He is a member of the Board of Directors of the Center for American Studies, of the Scientific Committee of Fondazione Unipolis, of the advisory board of WelfareIndexPMI (initiative of Generali and Confindustria), of the Advisory Committee of Confindustria Piccola Industria, of the Stakeholder Advisory Board of Edison, and several Board of Directors as an independent director.

He is a member of several think-tanks: Aspen Institute, Chatham House, IAI - International Affairs Institute, Young Leaders of the Council on Relations for the US and Italy, The Economic Club of New York

== Publications ==
- The Great Disconnect. Hopes and fears after the excess of globalization, Bocconi University Press
- Il Grande Scollamento. Timori e speranze dopo gli eccessi della globalizzazione, Bocconi University Press
- Making the Global Economy Work for Everyone, Palgrave Macmillan https://www.amazon.it/Making-Global-Economy-Work-Everyone/dp/3030920836
- Fatti non foste a viver come robot
- Terre e Buoi dei Paesi Tuoi – UTET.
- Sette Anni di Vacche Sobrie – UTET.
- Creating Economic Growth – Palgrave Macmillan.

Magnani has a column (Letters from Cambridge, Massachusetts) on Italian financial newspaper IlSole24Ore and writes for AffarInternazionali and other newspapers, magazines and websites.
