= Rolf Huser =

Swiss cyclist (born 1971)

Personal information
- Born: 5 June 1971 (age 55)

Cycling career
- Sport: Cycling
- Role: Rider

Professional teams
- 1996–1998: PMU Romand–Bepsa
- 1999–2000: Festina–Lotus
- 2001–2002: Team Coast

Rolf Huser (born 5 June 1971) is a Swiss racing cyclist. He rode in the 1999 Tour de France.

== Major results ==
1996
10th Overall Tour de l'Avenir
1998
5th Overall Tour of Austria
6th Rund um den Henninger Turm
7th Tour de Berne
8th Overall Tour de Luxembourg
1999
7th Overall Deutschland Tour
9th Giro del Piemonte
2000
7th Paris–Bourges
2002
7th Stausee-Rundfahrt Klingnau
