= Eladio Jiménez =

Spanish cyclist

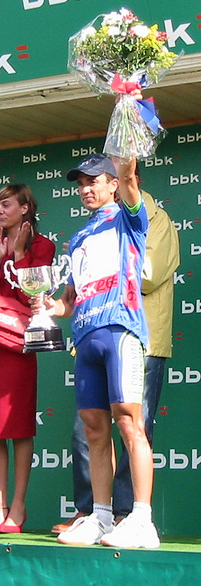

Personal information
- Full name: Eladio Jiménez Sánchez
- Born: 10 March 1976 (age 50) Ciudad Rodrigo, Province of Salamanca, Spain

Cycling career
- Sport: Cycling
- Current team: retired
- Discipline: Road
- Role: Rider

Professional teams
- 1998–2003: Banesto
- 2004–2006: Comunidad Valenciana-Kelme
- 2007: Karpin-Galicia
- 2008: Fercase-Rota dos Moveis
- 2009: Centro Ciclismo de Loule - Louletano

Major wins
- Vuelta a España, 3 stages

Eladio Jiménez Sánchez (born 10 March 1976 in Ciudad Rodrigo, Province of Salamanca) is a retired Spanish professional road bicycle racer. On 7 December 2009 the Union Cycliste Internationale (UCI) announced that Jiménez had tested positive for erythropoietin (EPO) after winning stage 6 of the 2009 Volta a Portugal. Three days later he announced his retirement. He was suspended until 11 August 2011.

== Palmarès ==
1994
1st, Spanish National Road Championships, Junior road race
3rd, UCI Road World Championships, Junior road race, Quito

2000
Vuelta a España

1st, Stage 5, Xorret de Catí

2001
1st, Stage 3, GP CTT Correios de Portugal, Matosinhos

2004
Vuelta a España

1st, Stage 10, Xorret de Catí

2005
1st, Overall, Euskal Bizikleta

1st, Stage 2, Tolosa

Vuelta a España

1st, Stage 14, Lagos de Covadonga
2nd, Mountains classification

2006
1st, Stage 5, Troféu Joaquim Agostinho, Torres Vedras

2007
3rd, Spanish National Road Championships, Elite road race, Cuenca
2nd, Overall, Troféu Joaquim Agostinho

1st, Stage 2, Alto Montejunto

Volta a Portugal

2nd, Stage 4, Santo Tirso
1st, Stage 6, Sra. da Graça
1st, Stage 9, Torre

2008
1st, Stage 3, Circuit de Lorraine, Gerardmer
1st, Stage 2, GP CTT Correios de Portugal, Seia

2009
~~1st, Stage 6, Volta a Portugal, 6th overall~~ (annulled after testing positive for EPO)
