= Massimiliano Gentili =

Italian cyclist

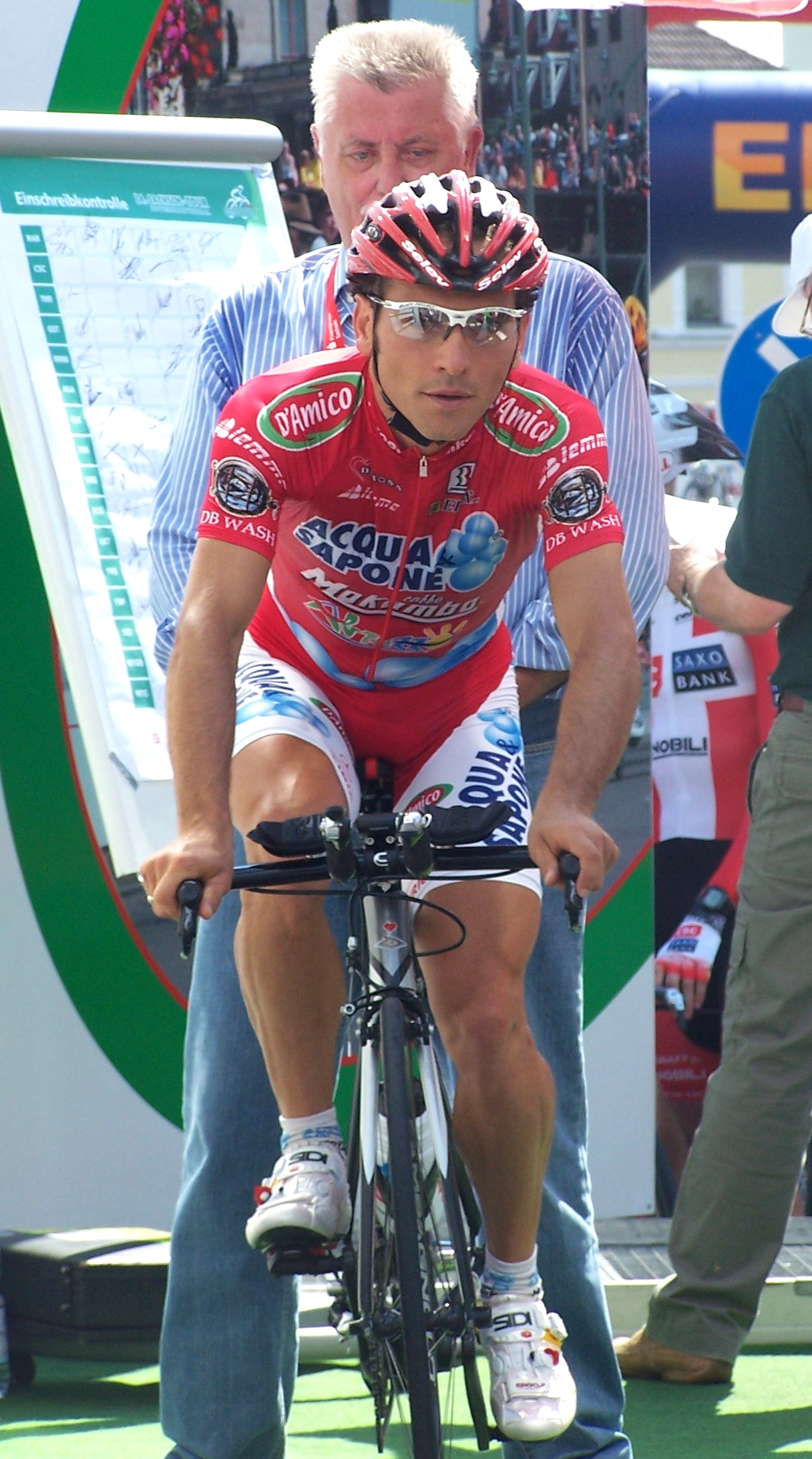

Personal information
- Born: 16 September 1971 (age 55) Foligno, Italy

Cycling career
- Sport: Cycling
- Current team: Retired
- Discipline: Road
- Role: Rider

Professional teams
- 1996–2007: Cantina Tollo–Co.Bo.
- 2008: Acqua & Sapone–Caffè Mokambo
- 2009–2010: Ceramica Flaminia–Bossini Docce

Massimiliano Gentili (born 16 September 1971 in Foligno) is an Italian former road cyclist.

== Major results ==
1992
2nd Coppa della Pace
1994
5th GP Capodarco
1995
1st Giro del Casentino
1st Gran Premio Inda
4th Gran Premio della Liberazione
5th Overall Tour de Slovénie
1996
1st Stage 5 Vuelta a Asturias
1st Stage 11 Volta a Portugal
4th Overall Volta a Catalunya
8th Giro dell'Appennino
9th Overall Giro del Trentino
1997
4th Overall Tirreno–Adriatico
1998
5th Coppa Agostoni
6th Züri-Metzgete
10th Overall Volta a la Comunitat Valenciana
1999
10th GP Industria & Artigianato
2000
4th Trofeo dello Scalatore
8th GP Industria & Commercio di Prato
9th Overall Vuelta a España
2001
8th Giro del Veneto
8th GP Industria & Artigianato
2002
4th Züri-Metzgete
5th Subida al Naranco
6th GP Città di Camaiore
8th Giro del Veneto
10th Overall Tour de l'Ain
2003
5th Giro del Veneto
2004
3rd Overall Brixia Tour
4th Overall Bayern-Rundfahrt

1st Stage 4

7th Coppa Agostoni
7th Giro di Toscana
8th GP Industria & Artigianato
8th GP Città di Camaiore
9th Trofeo Laigueglia
10th Züri-Metzgete
2005
5th Trofeo Matteotti
8th GP Fred Mengoni
9th Giro di Lombardia
9th Stausee-Rundfahrt Klingnau
10th Overall Euskal Bizikleta

1st Stage 6

2006
8th GP Fred Mengoni
10th Overall Brixia Tour
2008
6th Overall Giro della Provincia di reggio Calabria
7th Overall Euskal Bizikleta
2009
8th Overall Settimana Ciclistica Lombarda
8th Overall Route du Sud
9th Trofeo Melinda
2010
7th GP Industria & Artigianato

=== Grand Tour general classification results timeline ===
| Grand Tour | 1996 | 1997 | 1998 | 1999 | 2000 | 2001 |
|---|---|---|---|---|---|---|
| Giro d'Italia | — | 23 | — | 50 | — | 22 |
| Tour de France | — | — | — | — | — | — |
| Vuelta a España | DNF | 29 | DNF | — | 9 | DNF |
