= Saulius Šarkauskas =

Lithuanian cyclist (born 1970)

Personal information
- Born: 25 April 1970 (age 56) Klaipėda, Lithuanian SSR, Soviet Union

Cycling career
- Sport: Cycling

Saulius Šarkauskas (born 25 April 1970) is a Lithuanian former cyclist. He competed at the 1992 Summer Olympics and the 2000 Summer Olympics.
