= Jon Odriozola =

Spanish bicycle racer

Personal information
- Full name: Jon Odriozola Mugarza
- Born: 26 December 1970 (age 55) Oñati, Spain
- Height: 1.81 m (5 ft 11 1/2 in)
- Weight: 73 kg (161 lb; 11 st 7 lb)

Cycling career
- Sport: Cycling
- Discipline: Road
- Role: Rider (retired); Team manager

Amateur team
- 1992–1994: Iberdrola

Professional teams
- 1995–1997: Gewiss–Ballan
- 1998–2003: Banesto
- 2004: Comunidad Valenciana–Kelme

Managerial teams
- 2005–2006: Orbea (team manager)
- 2007–2008: Euskaltel–Euskadi (team manager)
- 2015–2019: Murias Taldea

Jon Odriozola Mugarza (born 26 December 1970) is a Spanish former cyclist who rode professionally between 1995 and 2004 for the Batik–Del Monte, iBanesto.com and Comunidad Valenciana–Kelme teams. Odriozola most recently worked as the general manager for UCI Professional Continental team Euskadi–Murias.

== Career achievements ==
=== Major results ===
1997
3rd Subida a Urkiola
3rd GP Llodio
2001
1st Subida a Urkiola

=== Grand Tour general classification results timeline ===
| Grand Tour | 1995 | 1996 | 1997 | 1998 | 1999 | 2000 | 2001 | 2002 |
|---|---|---|---|---|---|---|---|---|
| Giro d'Italia | — | — | — | — | — | — | 59 | — |
| Tour de France | — | — | 65 | — | 54 | 47 | 69 | — |
| Vuelta a España | DNF | 75 | — | 12 | 27 | 26 | 83 | DNF |

Legend
| — | Did not compete |
| DNF | Did not finish |
