= Davide Bramati =

Italian cyclist

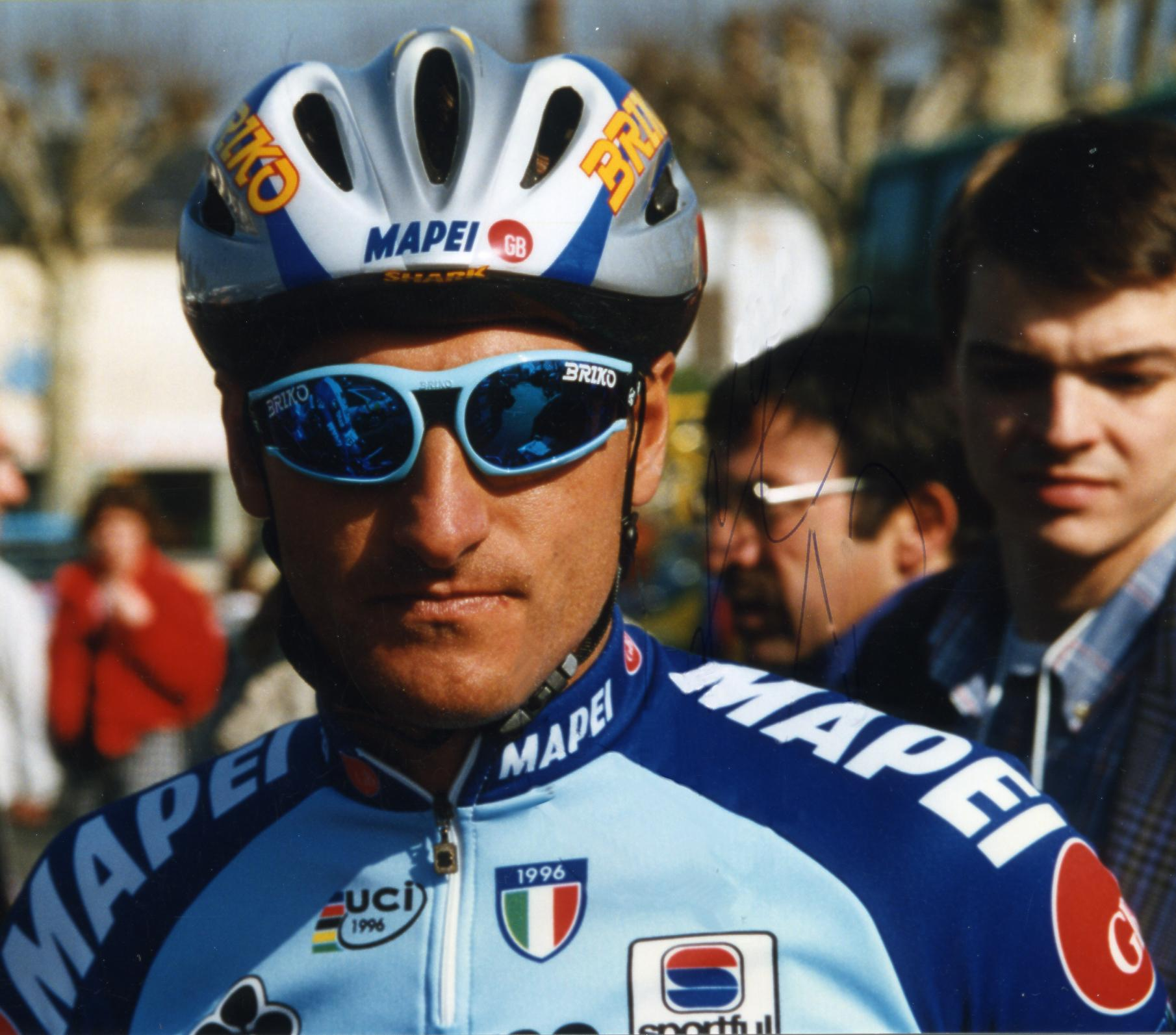

Personal information
- Full name: Davide Bramati
- Born: 28 June 1968 (age 58) Vaprio d'Adda, Italy

Cycling career
- Sport: Cycling
- Discipline: Road
- Role: Rider

Professional teams
- 1990: Diana–Colnago
- 1991: Colnago–Lampre
- 1992–1995: Lampre–Colnago
- 1996: Ceramiche Panaria–Vinavil
- 1997–2002: Mapei–GB
- 2003–2006: Quick-Step–Davitamon

Major wins
- Grand Tours Vuelta a España 1 individual stage (2000)

Davide Bramati (born 28 June 1968, in Vaprio d'Adda) is a former Italian professional road bicycle racer who last rode at the UCI ProTeam level with the Quick-Step–Innergetic team, which he joined in 2003 debuting for them at the Tour Down Under in Australia.

He retired as a professional cyclist in 2006, when he transitioned to team manager. In 2015, he was Etixx–Quick-Step's sports director.

== Major results ==
1992
1st Stage 13 Volta a Portugal
1997
1st Stage 3 Giro del Trentino
1999
1st Stage 1 Vuelta a Murcia
2000
1st Stage 17 Vuelta a España
2002
1st Stage 4 Vuelta a Aragón
