= Santos González =

Spanish cyclist

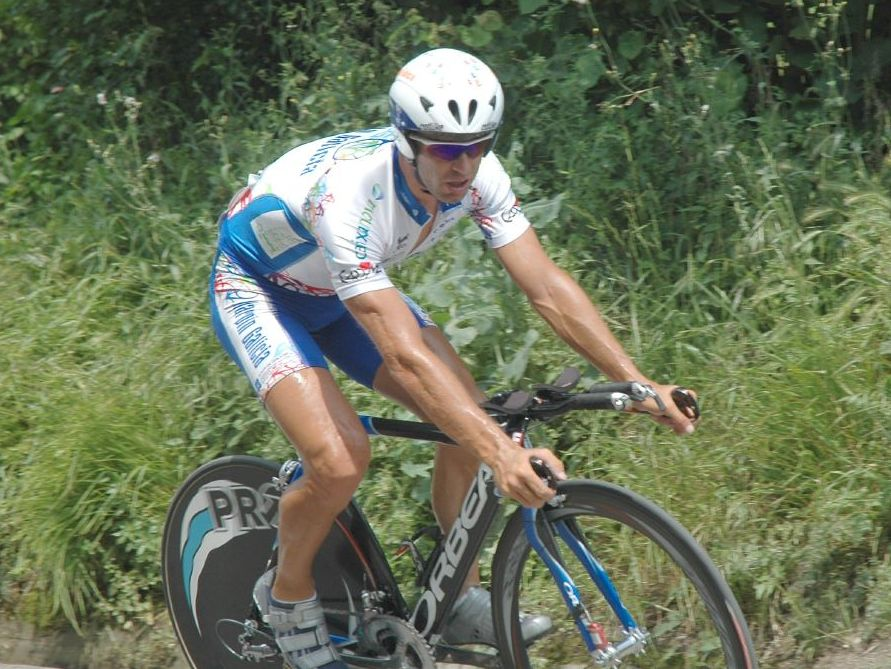
- González at the 2007 Euskal Bizikleta

Personal information
- Full name: Santos González Capilla
- Born: 17 December 1973 (age 52) Crevillent, Spain

Cycling career
- Sport: Cycling
- Discipline: Road
- Role: Time trialist

Professional teams
- 1995–1998: Kelme
- 1999–2001: ONCE
- 2002: Acqua & Sapone
- 2003: Domina Vacanze
- 2004–2005: Phonak
- 2006: 3 Molinos Resort
- 2007: Karpin-Galicia

Major wins
- Grand Tours Vuelta a España 1 individual stage (2000) Stage races Vuelta a Murcia (2006) One-day races and Classics National Time Trial Championships (1999, 2001)

Santos González Capilla (born 17 December 1973) is a Spanish professional road bicycle racer. Being a time trial specialist, he won the Spanish National Time Trial Championship in 1999 and 2001. In 2000 he won a stage in Vuelta a España, where he finished fourth. He also rode at the 1992 Summer Olympics and the 2000 Summer Olympics.

== Major results ==
1994
1st Prologue Tour de Normandie
1996
5th Overall Vuelta a Murcia
1997
1st Stage 9 Ruta Mexico
3rd Overall Vuelta a Murcia
9th Overall Vuelta a Andalucía
1998
3rd Overall Volta a la Comunitat Valenciana
1999
National Road Championships

1st Time trial
6th Road race

2000
1st Stage 1 (ITT) Vuelta a Castilla y León
1st Stage 1 (TTT) Volta a Catalunya
4th Overall Vuelta a España

1st Stage 21 (ITT)
Held after Stage 10

4th Gran Premio de Llodio
8th Time trial, Olympic Games
2001
1st Time trial, National Road Championships
1st Stage 1 (TTT) Volta a Catalunya
7th Time trial, UCI Road World Championships
8th Memorial Manuel Galera
2002
5th Overall Rothaus Regio-Tour
2005
1st Stage 1 (TTT) Volta a Catalunya
2nd Time trial, National Road Championships
2006
1st Overall Vuelta a Murcia
10th Overall Volta a la Comunitat Valenciana
2007
8th Overall Volta ao Distrito de Santarém

=== Grand Tour general classification results timeline ===
| Grand Tour | 1996 | 1997 | 1998 | 1999 | 2000 | 2001 | 2002 | 2003 | 2004 | 2005 | 2006 | 2007 |
|---|---|---|---|---|---|---|---|---|---|---|---|---|
| Giro d'Italia | — | — | — | 85 | — | — | — | — | — | — | — | — |
| Tour de France | — | — | DNF | 61 | — | — | — | — | 31 | — | — | — |
| / Vuelta a España | 51 | DNF | — | — | 4 | 66 | 59 | 11 | DNF | DNF | — | 105 |

Legend
| — | Did not compete |
| DNF | Did not finish |
