= Álvaro González de Galdeano =

Spanish cyclist

Personal information
- Full name: Álvaro González de Galdeano Aranzábal
- Born: 3 January 1970 (age 56) Vitoria

Cycling career
- Sport: Cycling
- Current team: Retired
- Discipline: Road
- Role: Rider

Professional teams
- 1992–1994: Artiach–Royal
- 1995–1998: Equipo Euskadi
- 1999–2000: Vitalicio Seguros
- 2000–2004: ONCE–Deutsche Bank

Managerial teams
- 2007–2009: Orbea–Oreka SDA
- 2010–2013: Euskaltel–Euskadi

Major wins
- 2 stages Vuelta a España (1998, 2000), stage Giro d'Italia (2000), Spanish National Road Race Championships (2000)

Álvaro González de Galdeano Aranzábal (born 3 January 1970) is a Spanish former professional cyclist. He was the manager of the cycling team Euskaltel–Euskadi until it disbanded in 2013. He is the brother of Igor González de Galdeano.

== Career ==
Galdeano began his career as a professional cyclist in 1992 with the Spanish team Artiach–Royal. He competed in the team time trial at the 1992 Summer Olympics.

In 1995, he joined Equipo Euskadi with his brother Igor. The two brothers then stayed together and went to teams Vitalicio Seguros and ONCE–Deutsche Bank.

He had his best season in 2000, when he won the Spanish National Road Race Championships, and a stage of the Vuelta a España and Giro d'Italia. He was to a suspended for three months when he was caught doping.

After putting an end to his cycling career, he became manager of the Basque team Orbea–Oreka SDA.

== Major results ==
1994
1st Stage 6 Vuelta a México
1996
1st Stage 4 Vuelta a Asturias
2nd Time trial, National Road Championships
1998
1st Stage 2 Grand Prix Jornal de Noticias
5th Overall Grand Prix du Midi Libre
7th Overall Vuelta a España
1999
1st Stage 1 Vuelta a Asturias
3rd Time trial, National Road Championships
2000
National Road Championships

1st Road race
3rd Time trial

1st Stage 17 Giro d'Italia
1st Stage 15 Vuelta a España
2002
1st Stage 4 (TTT) Tour de France
2nd Overall Grand Prix du Midi Libre
3rd Time trial, National Road Championships

=== Grand Tour general classification results timeline ===
Grand Tour	1993	1994	1995	1996	1997	1998	1999	2000	2001	2002	2003
Giro d'Italia	—	—	—	—	—	—	—	49	70	—	—
Tour de France	—	—	—	—	—	—	24	—	DNF	DNF	122
Vuelta a España	DNF	94	72	62	DNF	7	56	DNF	—	—	—

Legend
—	Did not compete
DNF	Did not finish
