= Roberto Laiseka =

Spanish cyclist

Personal information
- Full name: Roberto Laiseka Jaio
- Born: June 17, 1969 (age 57) Guernica, Spain

Cycling career
- Sport: Cycling
- Current team: Retired
- Discipline: Road
- Role: Rider
- Rider type: Climbing specialist

Professional team
- 1994–2006: Euskadi–Petronor

Major wins
- Grand Tours Tour de France 1 individual stage (2001) Vuelta a España 3 individual stages (1999, 2000 & 2005)

Roberto Laiseka Jaio (born 17 June 1969) is a Spanish former professional road bicycle racer. He retired in 2006, after 13 seasons as a professional with the Euskaltel–Euskadi team, after he could not recover from a knee injury suffered in the 2006 Giro d'Italia. Over his 13-year career Laiseka only achieved five professional victories, four of them in Grand Tours.

== Career ==
Laiseka started riding for the Amateur Euskatel team in 1989 before the team became professional in 1994.

Laiseka only rode for one team over his career the Euskaltel–Euskadi team. He was a founding rider of the team and the last of the original team to retire.

In 2001 his team, Euskaltel–Euskadi, was invited to their first Tour de France. He won stage 14 of the Tour de France.

His final professional win came in 2005 at the Vuelta a España, he jumped away with 3 km to go in Stage 11 to win by fifteen seconds ahead of the favorites group.

Having not raced since he crashed out of the 2006 Giro d'Italia, Laiseka underwent a second surgery in October to remove bone remnants remaining from the crash.

== Major results ==
1993
3rd Subida a Gorla-Bergara
1995
10th Overall Troféu Joaquim Agostinho
1997
6th Overall Vuelta a los Valles Mineros
7th Subida al Naranco
1998
4th Overall Grande Prémio Internacional de Ciclismo MR Cortez-Mitsubishi
1999
1st Subida al Txitxarro
1st Stage 18 Vuelta a España
3rd Subida al Naranco
6th Overall Volta a Catalunya
6th Overall Euskal Bizikleta
2000
6th Overall Vuelta a España

1st Stage 11

9th Subida al Naranco
2001
1st Stage 14 Tour de France
5th Overall Escalada a Montjuïc
9th Overall Clásica Internacional de Alcobendas
9th Overall Euskal Bizikleta
2003
5th Overall Euskal Bizikleta
9th Overall Tour de Romandie
9th Overall Escalada a Montjuïc
2004
2nd Overall Euskal Bizikleta

1st Stage 5

3rd Overall Volta a Catalunya
9th Overall Clasica a Alcobendas
2005
1st Stage 11 Vuelta a España
1st Mountain classification Tour de Suisse
