= Txema del Olmo =

Spanish cyclist

Personal information
- Full name: Txema del Olmo Zendegi
- Born: 26 April 1973 (age 53) Bilbao, Spain

Cycling career
- Sport: Cycling
- Current team: Retired
- Discipline: Road
- Role: Rider

Amateur team
- 1997: Equipo Euskadi (stagiaire)

Professional teams
- 1998–2001: Euskaltel–Euskadi
- 2002–2005: Milaneza–MSS

Txema del Olmo Zendegi (born 26 April 1973 in Bilbao) is a Spanish former professional cyclist. He rode in 4 grand tours, including 3 editions of the Vuelta a España and 1 Tour de France.

== Major results ==
1997
3rd Memorial Manuel Galera
3rd Clásica Memorial Txuma
1998
2nd Overall Tour de l'Avenir

1st Stage 8

2000
10th Overall Tour of the Basque Country
