= Aurum Hotels =

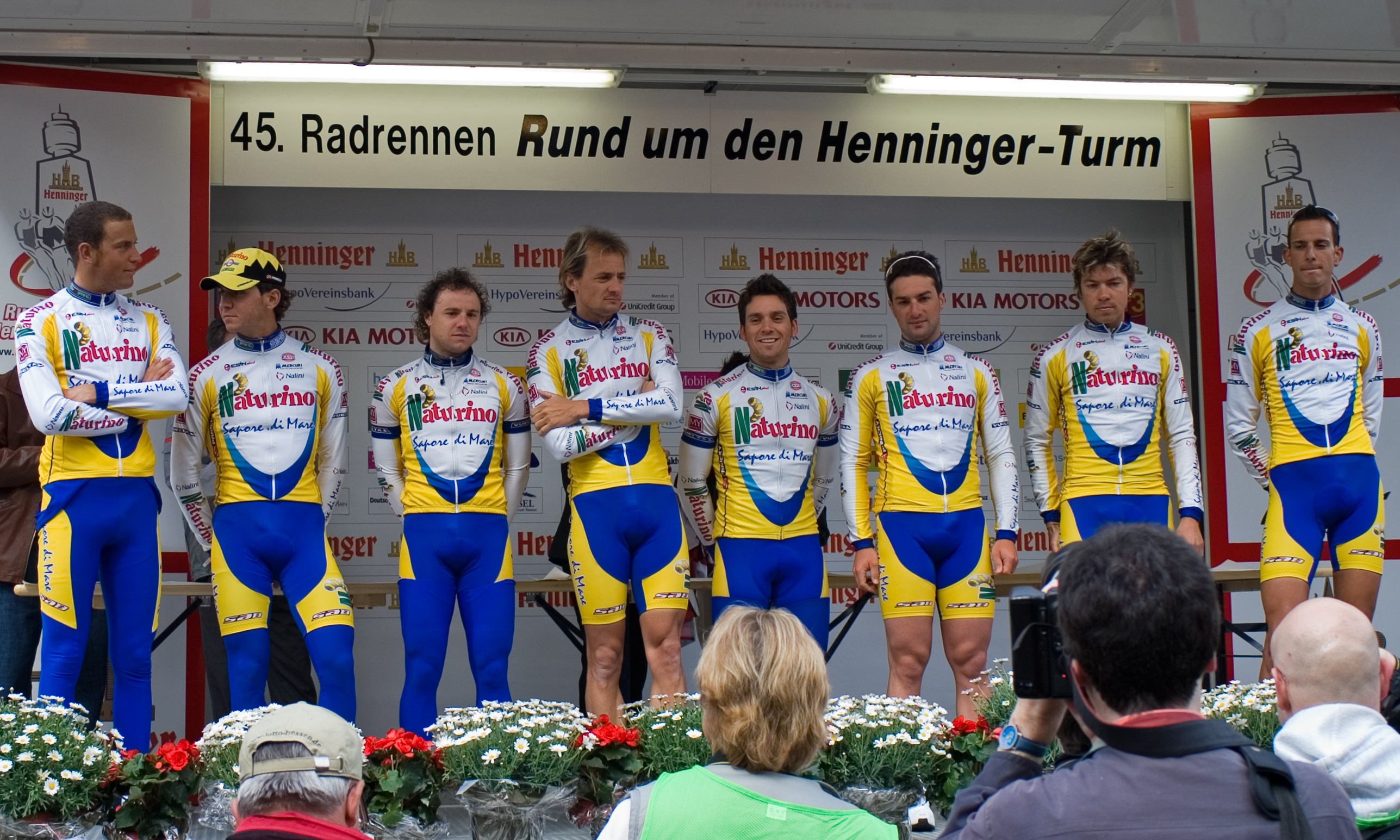
- The team in 2006

Team information
- Registered: Slovenia (1996); Italy (1997–2004); Switzerland (2005); Italy (2006–2007)
- Founded: 1996
- Disbanded: 2007
- Discipline: Road
- Status: UCI Professional Continental (2005–2006); UCI Continental (2007)

Team name history
- 1996 1997 1998–1999 2000 2001 2002 2003 2004 2005–2006 2007: Cantina Tollo–Co.Bo. Cantina Tollo–Carrier–Starplast; Cantina Tollo–Alexia Alluminio; Cantina Tollo–Regain; Cantina Tollo–Acqua & Sapone; Acqua & Sapone–Cantina Tollo; Domina Vacanze–Elitron; Domina Vacanze; Naturino–Sapore di Mare; Aurum Hotels

Aurum Hotels was an Italian professional cycling team founded in 1996 and disbanded in 2007. Over the years the team included several stars such as Danilo Di Luca and Mario Cipollini.

Two of their sponsors later sponsored other teams: Acqua & Sapone ran from 2004 until 2012, while Domina Vacanze left the team in 2004 to sponsor the former De Nardi for the 2005 season. The team became Aurum Hotels in 2007.

== History ==
In 2004 they rode Specialized bikes. Mario Cipollini left the team in 2004 taking many teammates with him forcing the team to start-anew in 2005. In 2005 at the Subida al Naranco, Alessio Galletti had a heart-attack which led to cardiac arrest and he died.

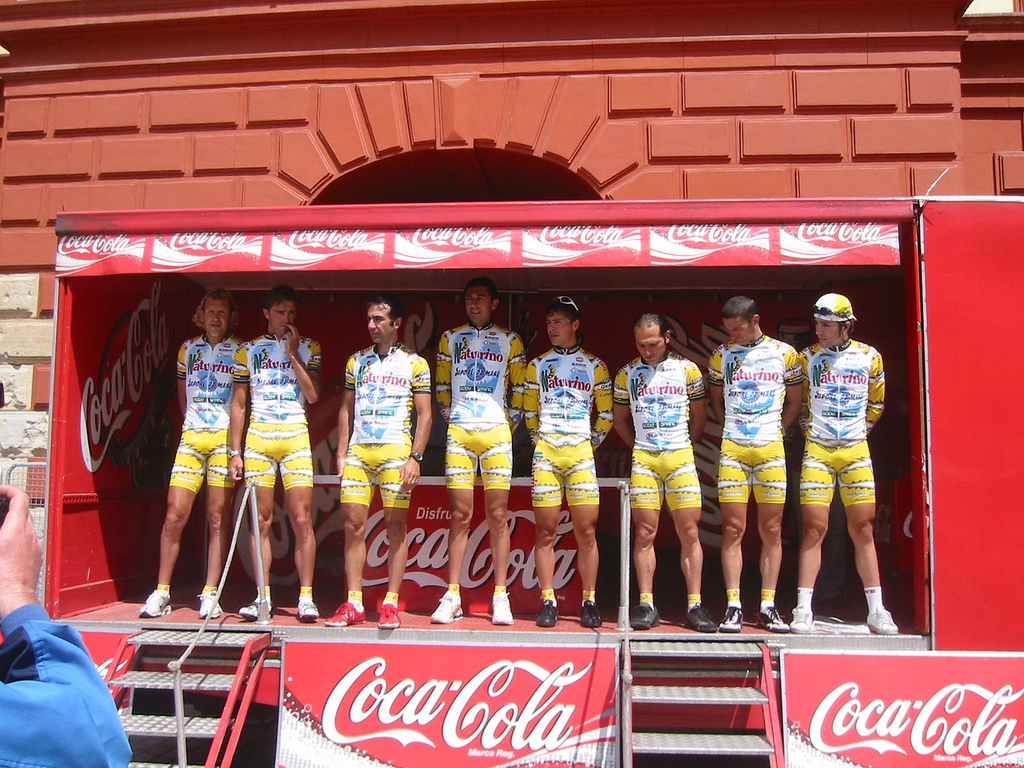
The team in 2005
