= List of teams and cyclists in the 1999 Vuelta a España =

For the 1999 Vuelta a España, the field consisted of 189 riders; 115 finished the race.

== By rider ==
Legend
No.	Starting number worn by the rider during the Vuelta
Pos.	Position in the general classification
DNF	Denotes a rider who did not finish

No.	Name	Nationality	Team	Pos.	Ref
1	Abraham Olano	Spain	ONCE–Deutsche Bank	DNF	
2	Íñigo Cuesta	Spain	ONCE–Deutsche Bank	45	
3	Rafael Díaz Justo	Spain	ONCE–Deutsche Bank	57	
4	Laurent Jalabert	France	ONCE–Deutsche Bank	DNF	
5	Peter Luttenberger	Austria	ONCE–Deutsche Bank	DNF	
6	Miguel Ángel Martín Perdiguero	Spain	ONCE–Deutsche Bank	61	
7	Luis Perez	Spain	ONCE–Deutsche Bank	67	
8	Marcos Serrano	Spain	ONCE–Deutsche Bank	34	
9	Mikel Zarrabeitia	Spain	ONCE–Deutsche Bank	11	
11	Alex Zülle	Switzerland	Banesto	37	
12	Manuel Beltrán	Spain	Banesto	7	
13	José Vicente García Acosta	Spain	Banesto	53	
14	Orlando Rodrigues	Portugal	Banesto	DNF	
15	José María Jiménez	Spain	Banesto	5	
16	Jon Odriozola	Spain	Banesto	27	
17	Aitor Osa	Spain	Banesto	15	
18	Leonardo Piepoli	Italy	Banesto	8	
19	César Solaun	Spain	Banesto	66	
21	Frank Vandenbroucke	Belgium	Cofidis	12	
22	Grzegorz Gwiazdowski	Poland	Cofidis	DNF	
23	Nicolas Jalabert	France	Cofidis	DNF	
24	Bobby Julich	United States	Cofidis	DNF	
25	Massimiliano Lelli	Italy	Cofidis	49	
26	Nico Mattan	Belgium	Cofidis	DNF	
27	Roland Meier	Switzerland	Cofidis	DNF	
28	Anthony Rokia	France	Cofidis	DNF	
29	Christophe Rinero	France	Cofidis	DNF	
31	Francesco Arazzi	Italy	Amica Chips–Costa de Almeria	DNF	
32	Stefano Casagranda	Italy	Amica Chips–Costa de Almeria	108	
33	Daniele De Paoli	Italy	Amica Chips–Costa de Almeria	DNF	
34	Viatcheslav Ekimov	Russia	Amica Chips–Costa de Almeria	55	
35	Daniele Galli	Italy	Amica Chips–Costa de Almeria	DNF	
36	Marco Gili	Italy	Amica Chips–Costa de Almeria	111	
37	Carlos Golbano	Spain	Amica Chips–Costa de Almeria	105	
38	Alessandro Pozzi	Italy	Amica Chips–Costa de Almeria	109	
39	Fabio Roscioli	Italy	Amica Chips–Costa de Almeria	78	
41	Jan Ullrich	Germany	Team Telekom	1	
42	Rolf Aldag	Germany	Team Telekom	38	
43	Dirk Baldinger	Germany	Team Telekom	102	
44	Ralf Grabsch	Germany	Team Telekom	87	
45	Giuseppe Guerini	Italy	Team Telekom	DNF	
46	Jörg Jaksche	Germany	Team Telekom	35	
47	Danilo Hondo	Germany	Team Telekom	90	
48	Andreas Klöden	Germany	Team Telekom	62	
49	Giovanni Lombardi	Italy	Team Telekom	85	
51	Joseba Beloki	Spain	Euskaltel–Euskadi	DNF	
52	Ángel Castresana	Spain	Euskaltel–Euskadi	59	
53	Íñigo Chaurreau	Spain	Euskaltel–Euskadi	14	
54	Txema del Olmo	Spain	Euskaltel–Euskadi	16	
55	Unai Etxebarria	Venezuela	Euskaltel–Euskadi	98	
56	Igor Flores	Spain	Euskaltel–Euskadi	75	
57	Ramón González Arrieta	Spain	Euskaltel–Euskadi	52	
58	Roberto Laiseka	Spain	Euskaltel–Euskadi	18	
59	Alberto López de Munain	Spain	Euskaltel–Euskadi	71	
61	Eleuterio Anguita	Spain	Fuenlabrada	79	
62	Andrés Bermejo	Spain	Fuenlabrada	96	
63	Matías Cagigas	Spain	Fuenlabrada	92	
64	Pedro Díaz Lobato	Spain	Fuenlabrada	44	
65	César García	Spain	Fuenlabrada	DNF	
66	Germán Nieto	Spain	Fuenlabrada	104	
67	César Pérez	Spain	Fuenlabrada	110	
68	Stefano Verziagi	Italy	Fuenlabrada	84	
69	Juan Carlos Vicario	Spain	Fuenlabrada	28	
71	Fernando Escartín	Spain	Kelme–Costa Blanca	DNF	
72	José Ángel Vidal	Spain	Kelme–Costa Blanca	DNF	
73	Francisco Cabello	Spain	Kelme–Costa Blanca	81	
74	Ángel Edo	Spain	Kelme–Costa Blanca	95	
75	Roberto Heras	Spain	Kelme–Costa Blanca	3	
76	José Luis Rubiera	Spain	Kelme–Costa Blanca	6	
77	Antonio Tauler	Spain	Kelme–Costa Blanca	47	
78	José Manuel Uría	Spain	Kelme–Costa Blanca	13	
79	José Castelblanco	Colombia	Kelme–Costa Blanca	DNF	
81	Oscar Camenzind	Switzerland	Lampre–Daikin	48	
82	Simone Bertoletti	Italy	Lampre–Daikin	DNF	
83	Massimo Codol	Italy	Lampre–Daikin	22	
84	Marco Della Vedova	Italy	Lampre–Daikin	DNF	
85	Robert Hunter	South Africa	Lampre–Daikin	72	
86	Gabriele Missaglia	Italy	Lampre–Daikin	DNF	
87	Mariano Piccoli	Italy	Lampre–Daikin	58	
88	Zbigniew Spruch	Poland	Lampre–Daikin	DNF	
89	Ján Svorada	Czech Republic	Lampre–Daikin	DNF	
91	Andrey Teteryuk	Kazakhstan	Liquigas	50	
92	Daniele Contrini	Italy	Liquigas	DNF	
93	Endrio Leoni	Italy	Liquigas	DNF	
94	Ruslan Ivanov	Moldova	Liquigas	DNF	
95	Rodolfo Massi	Italy	Liquigas	DNF	
96	Nicola Miceli	Italy	Liquigas	36	
97	Marco Milesi	Italy	Liquigas	DNF	
98	Cristian Moreni	Italy	Liquigas	54	
99	Giancarlo Raimondi	Italy	Liquigas	103	
101	Andrei Tchmil	Belgium	Lotto–Mobistar	DNF	
102	Rik Verbrugghe	Belgium	Lotto–Mobistar	DNF	
103	Christophe Detilloux	Belgium	Lotto–Mobistar	DNF	
104	Jacky Durand	France	Lotto–Mobistar	DNF	
105	Chris Peers	Belgium	Lotto–Mobistar	DNF	
106	Jo Planckaert	Belgium	Lotto–Mobistar	DNF	
107	Kurt Van De Wouwer	Belgium	Lotto–Mobistar	31	
108	Paul Van Hyfte	Belgium	Lotto–Mobistar	76	
109	Koen Beeckman	Belgium	Lotto–Mobistar	106	
111	Wladimir Belli	Italy	Festina–Lotus	DNF	
112	Laurent Brochard	France	Festina–Lotus	43	
113	Félix García Casas	Spain	Festina–Lotus	17	
114	Jaime Hernández	Spain	Festina–Lotus	77	
115	Pascal Hervé	France	Festina–Lotus	80	
116	Fabian Jeker	Switzerland	Festina–Lotus	DNF	
117	Andrey Kivilev	Kazakhstan	Festina–Lotus	DNF	
118	José Ramón Uriarte	Spain	Festina–Lotus	65	
119	Marcel Wüst	Germany	Festina–Lotus	DNF	
121	Pavel Tonkov	Russia	Mapei–Quick-Step	4	
122	Paolo Bettini	Italy	Mapei–Quick-Step	32	
123	Gianni Faresin	Italy	Mapei–Quick-Step	25	
124	Manuel Fernández Ginés	Spain	Mapei–Quick-Step	DNF	
125	Chann McRae	United States	Mapei–Quick-Step	19	
126	Daniele Nardello	Italy	Mapei–Quick-Step	23	
127	Andrea Noè	Italy	Mapei–Quick-Step	41	
128	Andrea Tafi	Italy	Mapei–Quick-Step	29	
129	Stefano Zanini	Italy	Mapei–Quick-Step	DNF	
131	Davide Rebellin	Italy	Team Polti	DNF	
132	Daniel Atienza	Spain	Team Polti	DNF	
133	Enrico Cassani	Italy	Team Polti	DNF	
134	Stefano Cattai	Italy	Team Polti	51	
135	Fabrizio Guidi	Italy	Team Polti	DNF	
136	Leonardo Guidi	Italy	Team Polti	DNF	
137	Cristian Salvato	Italy	Team Polti	107	
138	Rossano Brasi	Italy	Team Polti	86	
139	Simone Zucchi	Italy	Team Polti	DNF	
141	Markus Zberg	Switzerland	Rabobank	30	
142	Niki Aebersold	Switzerland	Rabobank	20	
143	Jan Boven	Netherlands	Rabobank	63	
144	Bram de Groot	Netherlands	Rabobank	69	
145	Robbie McEwen	Australia	Rabobank	DNF	
146	Koos Moerenhout	Netherlands	Rabobank	DNF	
147	Grischa Niermann	Germany	Rabobank	33	
148	Rolf Sørensen	Denmark	Rabobank	DNF	
149	Aart Vierhouten	Netherlands	Rabobank	82	
151	Alessio Bongioni	Italy	Riso Scotti–Vinavil	DNF	
152	Kurt Asle Arvesen	Norway	Riso Scotti–Vinavil	DNF	
153	Oscar Pozzi	Italy	Riso Scotti–Vinavil	73	
154	Giuseppe Palumbo	Italy	Riso Scotti–Vinavil	93	
155	Arnoldas Saprykinas	Lithuania	Riso Scotti–Vinavil	89	
156	Samuele Schiavina	Italy	Riso Scotti–Vinavil	DNF	
157	Alexandr Shefer	Kazakhstan	Riso Scotti–Vinavil	46	
158	Filippo Simeoni	Italy	Riso Scotti–Vinavil	DNF	
159	Alain Turicchia	Italy	Riso Scotti–Vinavil	DNF	
161	Laurent Dufaux	Switzerland	Saeco–Cannondale	DNF	
162	Dario Andriotto	Italy	Saeco–Cannondale	DNF	
163	Igor Pugaci	Moldova	Saeco–Cannondale	115	
164	Salvatore Commesso	Italy	Saeco–Cannondale	68	
165	Dario Frigo	Italy	Saeco–Cannondale	DNF	
166	Eddy Mazzoleni	Italy	Saeco–Cannondale	60	
167	Armin Meier	Switzerland	Saeco–Cannondale	DNF	
168	Massimiliano Mori	Italy	Saeco–Cannondale	DNF	
169	Mario Traversoni	Italy	Saeco–Cannondale	100	
171	Melcior Mauri	Spain	Sport Lisboa e Benfica	26	
172	David Plaza	Spain	Sport Lisboa e Benfica	DNF	
173	Daniel Bayes	Spain	Sport Lisboa e Benfica	113	
174	José Antonio Garrido	Spain	Sport Lisboa e Benfica	101	
175	Joona Laukka	Finland	Sport Lisboa e Benfica	42	
176	Óscar López Uriarte	Spain	Sport Lisboa e Benfica	40	
177	Quintino Fernandes	Portugal	Sport Lisboa e Benfica	70	
178	Jorge Manuel Santos Silva	Portugal	Sport Lisboa e Benfica	DNF	
179	Luís Miguel Sarreira	Portugal	Sport Lisboa e Benfica	DNF	
181	Jeroen Blijlevens	Netherlands	TVM–Farm Frites	114	
182	Remco van der Ven	Netherlands	TVM–Farm Frites	99	
183	Sergei Ivanov	Russia	TVM–Farm Frites	DNF	
184	Andreas Klier	Germany	TVM–Farm Frites	74	
185	Servais Knaven	Netherlands	TVM–Farm Frites	94	
186	Michel Lafis	Sweden	TVM–Farm Frites	21	
187	Serguei Outschakov	Ukraine	TVM–Farm Frites	DNF	
188	Geert Van Bondt	Belgium	TVM–Farm Frites	83	
189	Peter Van Petegem	Belgium	TVM–Farm Frites	DNF	
191	Tyler Hamilton	United States	U.S. Postal Service	DNF	
192	Frankie Andreu	United States	U.S. Postal Service	88	
193	Julian Dean	New Zealand	U.S. Postal Service	112	
194	Frank Høj	Denmark	U.S. Postal Service	97	
195	Marty Jemison	United States	U.S. Postal Service	DNF	
196	Benoît Joachim	Luxembourg	U.S. Postal Service	DNF	
197	David George	South Africa	U.S. Postal Service	DNF	
198	Glenn Magnusson	Sweden	U.S. Postal Service	91	
199	Dylan Casey	United States	U.S. Postal Service	DNF	
201	Ángel Casero	Spain	Vitalicio Seguros	DNF	
202	Santiago Blanco	Spain	Vitalicio Seguros	10	
203	David García Marquina	Spain	Vitalicio Seguros	39	
204	Álvaro González de Galdeano	Spain	Vitalicio Seguros	56	
205	Igor González de Galdeano	Spain	Vitalicio Seguros	2	
206	Iván Parra	Colombia	Vitalicio Seguros	9	
207	Víctor Hugo Peña	Colombia	Vitalicio Seguros	DNF	
208	Serguei Smetanine	Russia	Vitalicio Seguros	64	
209	Andrei Zintchenko	Russia	Vitalicio Seguros	24	
