= 1999 Vuelta a España, Prologue to Stage 10 =

Cycling race stages

The 1999 Vuelta a España was the 54th edition of the Vuelta a España, one of cycling's Grand Tours. The Vuelta began in Murcia, with a prologue individual time trial on 4 September, and Stage 10 occurred on 15 September with a stage to Zaragoza. The race finished in Madrid on 26 September.

== Prologue ==
4 September 1999 — Murcia to Murcia, 6.1 km (3.8 mi) (ITT)

Prologue result

Rank	Rider	Team	Time
1	Igor González de Galdeano (ESP)	Vitalicio Seguros	6' 58.5"
2	Abraham Olano (ESP)	ONCE–Deutsche Bank	+ 1.064"
3	Miguel Ángel Martín Perdiguero (ESP)	ONCE–Deutsche Bank	+ 2.815"
4	Frank Høj (DEN)	U.S. Postal Service	+ 4.456"
5	Grischa Niermann (GER)	Rabobank	+ 4.487"
6	Jorge Manuel Santos Silva (POR)	Sport Lisboa e Benfica	+ 4.739"
7	Antonio Tauler (ESP)	Kelme–Costa Blanca	+ 5.252"
8	Íñigo Cuesta (ESP)	ONCE–Deutsche Bank	+ 5.527"
9	Víctor Hugo Peña (COL)	Festina–Lotus	+ 5.651"
10	Chann McRae (USA)	Mapei–Quick-Step	+ 5.975"

== Stage 1 ==
5 September 1999 — Murcia to Benidorm, 179 km (111 mi)

Stage 1 result

Rank	Rider	Team	Time
1	Robert Hunter (RSA)	Lampre–Daikin	4h 38' 11"
2	Serguei Outschakov (UKR)	TVM–Farm Frites	s.t.
3	Robbie McEwen (AUS)	Rabobank	s.t.
4	Mario Traversoni (ITA)	Saeco–Cannondale	s.t.
5	Daniele Galli (ITA)	Amica Chips–Costa de Almeria	s.t.
6	Jo Planckaert (BEL)	Lotto–Mobistar	s.t.
7	Miguel Ángel Martín Perdiguero (ESP)	ONCE–Deutsche Bank	s.t.
8	Andreas Klöden (GER)	Team Telekom	s.t.
9	Alain Turicchia (ITA)	Riso Scotti–MG Maglificio	s.t.
10	Andrey Kivilev (KAZ)	Festina–Lotus	s.t.

General classification after Stage 1

Rank	Rider	Team	Time
1	Jacky Durand (FRA)	Lotto–Mobistar	4h 45' 09"
2	Igor González de Galdeano (ESP)	Vitalicio Seguros	+ 2"
3	Abraham Olano (ESP)	ONCE–Deutsche Bank	+ 3"
4	Robert Hunter (RSA)	Lampre–Daikin	s.t.
5	Robbie McEwen (AUS)	Rabobank	+ 4"
6	Miguel Ángel Martín Perdiguero (ESP)	ONCE–Deutsche Bank	+ 5"
7	Frank Høj (DEN)	U.S. Postal Service	+ 6"
8	Grischa Niermann (GER)	Rabobank	s.t.
9	Jorge Manuel Santos Silva (POR)	Sport Lisboa e Benfica	+ 7"
10	Antonio Tauler (ESP)	Kelme–Costa Blanca	s.t.

== Stage 2 ==
6 September 1999 — Alicante to Albacete, 206 km (128 mi)

Stage 2 result

Rank	Rider	Team	Time
1	Marcel Wüst (GER)	Festina–Lotus	4h 46' 05"
2	Stefano Zanini (ITA)	Mapei–Quick-Step	s.t.
3	Giovanni Lombardi (ITA)	Team Telekom	s.t.
4	Robbie McEwen (AUS)	Rabobank	s.t.
5	Jeroen Blijlevens (NED)	TVM–Farm Frites	s.t.
6	Robert Hunter (RSA)	Lampre–Daikin	s.t.
7	Mario Traversoni (ITA)	Saeco–Cannondale	s.t.
8	Alain Turicchia (ITA)	Riso Scotti–MG Maglificio	s.t.
9	Julian Dean (NZL)	U.S. Postal Service	s.t.
10	Jo Planckaert (BEL)	Lotto–Mobistar	s.t.

General classification after Stage 2

Rank	Rider	Team	Time
1	Jacky Durand (FRA)	Lotto–Mobistar	9h 31' 14"
2	Igor González de Galdeano (ESP)	Vitalicio Seguros	+ 2"
3	Abraham Olano (ESP)	ONCE–Deutsche Bank	+ 3"
4	Robert Hunter (RSA)	Lampre–Daikin	s.t.
5	Íñigo Cuesta (ESP)	ONCE–Deutsche Bank	+ 4"
6	Michel Lafis (SWE)	TVM–Farm Frites	s.t.
7	Robbie McEwen (AUS)	Rabobank	s.t.
8	Grischa Niermann (GER)	Rabobank	s.t.
9	Miguel Ángel Martín Perdiguero (ESP)	ONCE–Deutsche Bank	+ 5"
10	Frank Høj (DEN)	U.S. Postal Service	+ 6"

== Stage 3 ==
7 September 1999 — La Roda to Fuenlabrada, 229.5 km (142.6 mi)

Stage 3 result

Rank	Rider	Team	Time
1	Marcel Wüst (GER)	Festina–Lotus	6h 02' 50"
2	Giovanni Lombardi (ITA)	Team Telekom	s.t.
3	Serguei Smetanine (RUS)	Vitalicio Seguros	s.t.
4	Servais Knaven (NED)	TVM–Farm Frites	s.t.
5	Ján Svorada (CZE)	Lampre–Daikin	s.t.
6	Fabrizio Guidi (ITA)	Team Polti	s.t.
7	Giancarlo Raimondi (ITA)	Liquigas	s.t.
8	Julian Dean (NZL)	U.S. Postal Service	s.t.
9	Cristian Moreni (ITA)	Liquigas	s.t.
10	Ángel Edo (ESP)	Kelme–Costa Blanca	s.t.

General classification after Stage 3

Rank	Rider	Team	Time
1	Marcel Wüst (GER)	Festina–Lotus	15h 33' 51"
2	Robbie McEwen (AUS)	Rabobank	+ 9"
3	Robert Hunter (RSA)	Lampre–Daikin	+ 10"
4	Igor González de Galdeano (ESP)	Vitalicio Seguros	+ 15"
5	Abraham Olano (ESP)	ONCE–Deutsche Bank	+ 16"
6	Íñigo Cuesta (ESP)	ONCE–Deutsche Bank	+ 17"
7	Michel Lafis (SWE)	TVM–Farm Frites	s.t.
8	Grischa Niermann (GER)	Rabobank	s.t.
9	Miguel Ángel Martín Perdiguero (ESP)	ONCE–Deutsche Bank	+ 18"
10	Frank Høj (DEN)	U.S. Postal Service	+ 19"

== Stage 4 ==
8 September 1999 — Las Rozas to Salamanca, 185.6 km (115.3 mi)

Stage 4 result

Rank	Rider	Team	Time
1	Marcel Wüst (GER)	Festina–Lotus	4h 21' 42"
2	Giovanni Lombardi (ITA)	Team Telekom	s.t.
3	Sergei Ivanov (RUS)	TVM–Farm Frites	s.t.
4	Stefano Zanini (ITA)	Mapei–Quick-Step	s.t.
5	Miguel Ángel Martín Perdiguero (ESP)	ONCE–Deutsche Bank	s.t.
6	Fabrizio Guidi (ITA)	Team Polti	s.t.
7	Robert Hunter (RSA)	Lampre–Daikin	s.t.
8	Glenn Magnusson (SWE)	U.S. Postal Service	s.t.
9	Frank Vandenbroucke (BEL)	Cofidis	s.t.
10	Mario Traversoni (ITA)	Saeco–Cannondale	s.t.

General classification after Stage 4

Rank	Rider	Team	Time
1	Marcel Wüst (GER)	Festina–Lotus	19h 55' 09"
2	Robbie McEwen (AUS)	Rabobank	+ 29"
3	Robert Hunter (RSA)	Lampre–Daikin	+ 34"
4	Igor González de Galdeano (ESP)	Vitalicio Seguros	+ 39"
5	Abraham Olano (ESP)	ONCE–Deutsche Bank	+ 40"
6	Íñigo Cuesta (ESP)	ONCE–Deutsche Bank	+ 41"
7	Michel Lafis (SWE)	TVM–Farm Frites	s.t.
8	Grischa Niermann (GER)	Rabobank	s.t.
9	Miguel Ángel Martín Perdiguero (ESP)	ONCE–Deutsche Bank	+ 42"
10	Serguei Smetanine (RUS)	Vitalicio Seguros	+ 44"

== Stage 5 ==
9 September 1999 — Béjar to Ciudad Rodrigo, 160 km (99 mi)

Stage 5 result

Rank	Rider	Team	Time
1	Jan Ullrich (GER)	Team Telekom	3h 52' 56"
2	Abraham Olano (ESP)	ONCE–Deutsche Bank	s.t.
3	Frank Vandenbroucke (BEL)	Cofidis	s.t.
4	Davide Rebellin (ITA)	Team Polti	s.t.
5	Ángel Casero (ESP)	Vitalicio Seguros	s.t.
6	Roberto Heras (ESP)	Kelme–Costa Blanca	s.t.
7	Igor González de Galdeano (ESP)	Vitalicio Seguros	s.t.
8	Kurt Van De Wouwer (BEL)	Lotto–Mobistar	s.t.
9	Fernando Escartín (ESP)	Kelme–Costa Blanca	s.t.
10	Manuel Beltrán (ESP)	Banesto	s.t.

General classification after Stage 5

Rank	Rider	Team	Time
1	Abraham Olano (ESP)	ONCE–Deutsche Bank	23h 48' 25"
2	Jan Ullrich (GER)	Team Telekom	+ 10"
3	Igor González de Galdeano (ESP)	Vitalicio Seguros	+ 15"
4	Íñigo Cuesta (ESP)	ONCE–Deutsche Bank	+ 19"
5	Frank Vandenbroucke (BEL)	Cofidis	+ 29"
6	Davide Rebellin (ITA)	Team Polti	+ 36"
7	Iván Parra (COL)	Vitalicio Seguros	s.t.
8	Ángel Casero (ESP)	Vitalicio Seguros	+ 37"
9	Roberto Laiseka (ESP)	Euskaltel–Euskadi	+ 39"
10	Kurt Van De Wouwer (BEL)	Lotto–Mobistar	+ 44"

== Stage 6 ==
10 September 1999 — Salamanca to Salamanca, 46.4 km (28.8 mi) (ITT)

Stage 6 result

Rank	Rider	Team	Time
1	Abraham Olano (ESP)	ONCE–Deutsche Bank	53' 32"
2	Jan Ullrich (GER)	Team Telekom	+ 57"
3	Ángel Casero (ESP)	Vitalicio Seguros	+ 2' 17"
4	Igor González de Galdeano (ESP)	Vitalicio Seguros	+ 2' 18"
5	Chann McRae (USA)	Mapei–Quick-Step	+ 2' 40"
6	Melcior Mauri (ESP)	Sport Lisboa e Benfica	+ 2' 57"
7	Íñigo Cuesta (ESP)	ONCE–Deutsche Bank	+ 2' 58"
8	Tyler Hamilton (USA)	U.S. Postal Service	+ 3' 11"
9	Iván Parra (COL)	Vitalicio Seguros	+ 3' 17"
10	Dylan Casey (USA)	U.S. Postal Service	+ 3' 27"

General classification after Stage 6

Rank	Rider	Team	Time
1	Abraham Olano (ESP)	ONCE–Deutsche Bank	24h 41' 57"
2	Jan Ullrich (GER)	Team Telekom	+ 1' 07"
3	Ángel Casero (ESP)	Vitalicio Seguros	+ 2' 33"
4	Igor González de Galdeano (ESP)	Vitalicio Seguros	+ 2' 54"
5	Chann McRae (USA)	Mapei–Quick-Step	+ 3' 17"
6	Melcior Mauri (ESP)	Sport Lisboa e Benfica	+ 3' 53"
7	Íñigo Cuesta (ESP)	ONCE–Deutsche Bank	+ 4' 42"
8	Tyler Hamilton (USA)	U.S. Postal Service	+ 4' 49"
9	Iván Parra (COL)	Vitalicio Seguros	+ 4' 56"
10	Dylan Casey (USA)	U.S. Postal Service	+ 5' 07"

== Stage 7 ==
11 September 1999 — Salamanca to León, 217 km (135 mi)

Stage 7 result

Rank	Rider	Team	Time
1	Marcel Wüst (GER)	Festina–Lotus	4h 39' 35"
2	Robbie McEwen (AUS)	Rabobank	s.t.
3	Mario Traversoni (ITA)	Saeco–Cannondale	s.t.
4	Glenn Magnusson (SWE)	U.S. Postal Service	s.t.
5	Danilo Hondo (GER)	Team Telekom	s.t.
6	Aart Vierhouten (NED)	Rabobank	s.t.
7	Pedro Díaz Lobato (ESP)	Fuenlabrada	s.t.
8	Giancarlo Raimondi (ITA)	Liquigas	s.t.
9	Alain Turicchia (ITA)	Riso Scotti–MG Maglificio	s.t.
10	Koen Beeckman (BEL)	Lotto–Mobistar	s.t.

General classification after Stage 7

Rank	Rider	Team	Time
1	Abraham Olano (ESP)	ONCE–Deutsche Bank	29h 21' 32"
2	Jan Ullrich (GER)	Team Telekom	+ 1' 07"
3	Igor González de Galdeano (ESP)	Vitalicio Seguros	+ 2' 33"
4	Ángel Casero (ESP)	Vitalicio Seguros	+ 2' 54"
5	Íñigo Cuesta (ESP)	ONCE–Deutsche Bank	+ 3' 17"
6	Iván Parra (COL)	Vitalicio Seguros	+ 3' 53"
7	Pavel Tonkov (RUS)	Mapei–Quick-Step	+ 4' 42"
8	Kurt Van De Wouwer (BEL)	Lotto–Mobistar	+ 4' 49"
9	Frank Vandenbroucke (BEL)	Cofidis	+ 4' 56"
10	Roberto Heras (ESP)	Kelme–Costa Blanca	+ 5' 07"

== Stage 8 ==
12 September 1999 — León to Alto de l'Angliru, 175.6 km (109.1 mi)

Stage 8 result

Rank	Rider	Team	Time
1	José María Jiménez (ESP)	Banesto	4h 52' 04"
2	Pavel Tonkov (RUS)	Mapei–Quick-Step	s.t.
3	Roberto Heras (ESP)	Kelme–Costa Blanca	+ 1' 01"
4	Manuel Beltrán (ESP)	Banesto	+ 1' 13"
5	Abraham Olano (ESP)	ONCE–Deutsche Bank	+ 1' 44"
6	Leonardo Piepoli (ITA)	Banesto	+ 2' 03"
7	Jan Ullrich (GER)	Team Telekom	+ 2' 45"
8	José Luis Rubiera (ESP)	Kelme–Costa Blanca	s.t.
9	Davide Rebellin (ITA)	Team Polti	+ 3' 00"
10	Igor González de Galdeano (ESP)	Vitalicio Seguros	+ 3' 09"

General classification after Stage 8

Rank	Rider	Team	Time
1	Abraham Olano (ESP)	ONCE–Deutsche Bank	34h 15' 20"
2	Jan Ullrich (GER)	Team Telekom	+ 2' 08"
3	Pavel Tonkov (RUS)	Mapei–Quick-Step	+ 2' 58"
4	Igor González de Galdeano (ESP)	Vitalicio Seguros	+ 3' 58"
5	Roberto Heras (ESP)	Kelme–Costa Blanca	+ 4' 24"
6	Ángel Casero (ESP)	Vitalicio Seguros	+ 4' 44"
7	José María Jiménez (ESP)	Banesto	+ 5' 29"
8	Manuel Beltrán (ESP)	Banesto	+ 6' 25"
9	Davide Rebellin (ITA)	Team Polti	+ 6' 53"
10	Leonardo Piepoli (ITA)	Banesto	+ 7' 19"

== Stage 9 ==
13 September 1999 — Gijón to Los Corrales de Buelna, 185.8 km (115.5 mi)

Stage 9 result

Rank	Rider	Team	Time
1	Laurent Brochard (FRA)	Festina–Lotus	4h 33' 04"
2	Oscar Camenzind (SUI)	Lampre–Daikin	+ 3"
3	Nicola Miceli (ITA)	Liquigas	s.t.
4	Andrei Zintchenko (RUS)	Vitalicio Seguros	s.t.
5	Rolf Sørensen (DEN)	Rabobank	s.t.
6	José Luis Rubiera (ESP)	Kelme–Costa Blanca	+ 8"
7	Stefano Zanini (ITA)	Mapei–Quick-Step	+ 54"
8	Serguei Outschakov (UKR)	TVM–Farm Frites	+ 1' 10"
9	Ralf Grabsch (GER)	Team Telekom	s.t.
10	Eddy Mazzoleni (ITA)	Saeco–Cannondale	+ 1' 16"

General classification after Stage 9

Rank	Rider	Team	Time
1	Abraham Olano (ESP)	ONCE–Deutsche Bank	38h 52' 14"
2	Jan Ullrich (GER)	Team Telekom	+ 2' 08"
3	Pavel Tonkov (RUS)	Mapei–Quick-Step	+ 2' 58"
4	Igor González de Galdeano (ESP)	Vitalicio Seguros	+ 3' 58"
5	Roberto Heras (ESP)	Kelme–Costa Blanca	+ 5' 05"
6	Ángel Casero (ESP)	Vitalicio Seguros	+ 5' 56"
7	José María Jiménez (ESP)	Banesto	+ 6' 10"
8	José Luis Rubiera (ESP)	Kelme–Costa Blanca	+ 6' 15"
9	Davide Rebellin (ITA)	Team Polti	+ 6' 53"
10	Manuel Beltrán (ESP)	Banesto	+ 7' 06"

== Rest day ==
14 September 1999

== Stage 10 ==
15 September 1999 — Zaragoza to Zaragoza, 183.2 km (113.8 mi)

Stage 10 result

Rank	Rider	Team	Time
1	Serguei Outschakov (UKR)	TVM–Farm Frites	4h 23' 57"
2	Fabio Roscioli (ITA)	Amica Chips–Costa de Almeria	s.t.
3	Jacky Durand (FRA)	Lotto–Mobistar	+ 13"
4	Eleuterio Anguita (ESP)	Fuenlabrada	s.t.
5	Stefano Casagranda (ITA)	Amica Chips–Costa de Almeria	+ 17"
6	Fabrizio Guidi (ITA)	Team Polti	+ 28"
7	Mario Traversoni (ITA)	Saeco–Cannondale	s.t.
8	Andreas Klier (GER)	TVM–Farm Frites	s.t.
9	Robert Hunter (RSA)	Lampre–Daikin	s.t.
10	Paolo Bettini (ITA)	Mapei–Quick-Step	s.t.

General classification after Stage 10

Rank	Rider	Team	Time
1	Abraham Olano (ESP)	ONCE–Deutsche Bank	43h 16' 39"
2	Jan Ullrich (GER)	Team Telekom	+ 2' 08"
3	Pavel Tonkov (RUS)	Mapei–Quick-Step	+ 2' 58"
4	Igor González de Galdeano (ESP)	Vitalicio Seguros	+ 3' 58"
5	Roberto Heras (ESP)	Kelme–Costa Blanca	+ 5' 05"
6	Ángel Casero (ESP)	Vitalicio Seguros	+ 5' 56"
7	José María Jiménez (ESP)	Banesto	+ 6' 10"
8	José Luis Rubiera (ESP)	Kelme–Costa Blanca	+ 6' 15"
9	Davide Rebellin (ITA)	Team Polti	+ 6' 53"
10	Manuel Beltrán (ESP)	Banesto	+ 7' 06"
