= 1999 Vuelta a España, Stage 11 to Stage 21 =

Cycling race

The 1999 Vuelta a España was the 54th edition of the Vuelta a España, one of cycling's Grand Tours. The Vuelta began in Murcia, with a prologue individual time trial on 4 September, and Stage 11 occurred on 16 September with a stage from Huesca. The race finished in Madrid on 26 September.

== Stage 11 ==
16 September 1999 — Huesca to Val d'Aran/Pla de Beret, 201 km (125 mi)

Stage 11 result

Rank	Rider	Team	Time
1	Daniele Nardello (ITA)	Mapei–Quick-Step	5h 01' 37"
2	Víctor Hugo Peña (COL)	Vitalicio Seguros	s.t.
3	Félix García Casas (ESP)	Festina–Lotus	s.t.
4	José Manuel Uría (ESP)	Kelme–Costa Blanca	s.t.
5	José Vicente García Acosta (ESP)	Banesto	+ 6"
6	Jon Odriozola (ESP)	Banesto	+ 31"
7	Ruslan Ivanov (MDA)	Liquigas	+ 1' 30"
8	David García Marquina (ESP)	Vitalicio Seguros	s.t.
9	Melcior Mauri (ESP)	Sport Lisboa e Benfica	s.t.
10	Massimo Codol (ITA)	Lampre–Daikin	+ 1' 42"

General classification after Stage 11

Rank	Rider	Team	Time
1	Abraham Olano (ESP)	ONCE–Deutsche Bank	48h 25' 44"
2	Jan Ullrich (GER)	Team Telekom	+ 1' 39"
3	Pavel Tonkov (RUS)	Mapei–Quick-Step	+ 2' 29"
4	Igor González de Galdeano (ESP)	Vitalicio Seguros	+ 3' 17"
5	Roberto Heras (ESP)	Kelme–Costa Blanca	+ 4' 36"
6	Ángel Casero (ESP)	Vitalicio Seguros	+ 5' 27"
7	José María Jiménez (ESP)	Banesto	+ 5' 41"
8	José Luis Rubiera (ESP)	Kelme–Costa Blanca	+ 5' 55"
9	Davide Rebellin (ITA)	Team Polti	+ 6' 33"
10	Manuel Beltrán (ESP)	Banesto	+ 6' 37"

== Stage 12 ==
17 September 1999 — Sort to Arcalis, 147.4 km (91.6 mi)

Stage 12 result

Rank	Rider	Team	Time
1	Igor González de Galdeano (ESP)	Vitalicio Seguros	4h 18' 41"
2	Roberto Heras (ESP)	Kelme–Costa Blanca	+ 40"
3	José María Jiménez (ESP)	Banesto	+ 41"
4	Leonardo Piepoli (ITA)	Banesto	s.t.
5	José Luis Rubiera (ESP)	Kelme–Costa Blanca	+ 1' 00"
6	Manuel Beltrán (ESP)	Banesto	s.t.
7	Pavel Tonkov (RUS)	Mapei–Quick-Step	s.t.
8	Ángel Casero (ESP)	Vitalicio Seguros	s.t.
9	Iván Parra (COL)	Vitalicio Seguros	+ 1' 02"
10	Jan Ullrich (GER)	Team Telekom	s.t.

General classification after Stage 12

Rank	Rider	Team	Time
1	Jan Ullrich (GER)	Team Telekom	52h 47' 06"
2	Igor González de Galdeano (ESP)	Vitalicio Seguros	+ 36"
3	Pavel Tonkov (RUS)	Mapei–Quick-Step	+ 48"
4	Roberto Heras (ESP)	Kelme–Costa Blanca	+ 2' 35"
5	José María Jiménez (ESP)	Banesto	+ 3' 41"
6	Ángel Casero (ESP)	Vitalicio Seguros	+ 3' 46"
7	José Luis Rubiera (ESP)	Kelme–Costa Blanca	+ 4' 14"
8	Manuel Beltrán (ESP)	Banesto	+ 4' 56"
9	Abraham Olano (ESP)	ONCE–Deutsche Bank	+ 5' 43"
10	Leonardo Piepoli (ITA)	Banesto	+ 6' 02"

== Stage 13 ==
18 September 1999 — Andorra la Vella to Castellar del Riu, 149 km (93 mi)

Stage 13 result

Rank	Rider	Team	Time
1	Alex Zülle (SUI)	Banesto	3h 54' 34"
2	Nicola Miceli (ITA)	Liquigas	+ 14"
3	José María Jiménez (ESP)	Banesto	+ 32"
4	Leonardo Piepoli (ITA)	Banesto	+ 36"
5	Jan Ullrich (GER)	Team Telekom	+ 38"
6	Roberto Heras (ESP)	Kelme–Costa Blanca	s.t.
7	José Manuel Uría (ESP)	Kelme–Costa Blanca	+ 47"
8	Manuel Beltrán (ESP)	Banesto	s.t.
9	José Luis Rubiera (ESP)	Kelme–Costa Blanca	s.t.
10	Igor González de Galdeano (ESP)	Vitalicio Seguros	+ 51"

General classification after Stage 13

Rank	Rider	Team	Time
1	Jan Ullrich (GER)	Team Telekom	56h 42' 18"
2	Igor González de Galdeano (ESP)	Vitalicio Seguros	+ 49"
3	Roberto Heras (ESP)	Kelme–Costa Blanca	+ 2' 35"
4	José María Jiménez (ESP)	Banesto	+ 3' 35"
5	Pavel Tonkov (RUS)	Mapei–Quick-Step	+ 3' 45"
6	José Luis Rubiera (ESP)	Kelme–Costa Blanca	+ 4' 23"
7	Manuel Beltrán (ESP)	Banesto	+ 5' 05"
8	Ángel Casero (ESP)	Vitalicio Seguros	+ 5' 19"
9	Leonardo Piepoli (ITA)	Banesto	+ 6' 00"
10	Iván Parra (COL)	Vitalicio Seguros	+ 8' 08"

== Stage 14 ==
19 September 1999 — Barcelona to Barcelona, 94.4 km (58.7 mi)

Stage 14 result

Rank	Rider	Team	Time
1	Fabio Roscioli (ITA)	Amica Chips–Costa de Almeria	2h 34' 41"
2	Massimiliano Lelli (ITA)	Cofidis	s.t.
3	Glenn Magnusson (SWE)	U.S. Postal Service	+ 1' 52"
4	Frank Høj (DEN)	U.S. Postal Service	s.t.
5	Andrei Zintchenko (RUS)	Vitalicio Seguros	s.t.
6	Marcel Wüst (GER)	Festina–Lotus	s.t.
7	Andrea Tafi (ITA)	Mapei–Quick-Step	s.t.
8	Simone Zucchi (ITA)	Team Polti	s.t.
9	Pedro Díaz Lobato (ESP)	Fuenlabrada	s.t.
10	Giuseppe Palumbo (ITA)	Riso Scotti–Vinavil	s.t.

General classification after Stage 14

Rank	Rider	Team	Time
1	Jan Ullrich (GER)	Team Telekom	59h 18' 51"
2	Igor González de Galdeano (ESP)	Vitalicio Seguros	+ 49"
3	Roberto Heras (ESP)	Kelme–Costa Blanca	+ 2' 35"
4	José María Jiménez (ESP)	Banesto	+ 3' 35"
5	Pavel Tonkov (RUS)	Mapei–Quick-Step	+ 3' 45"
6	José Luis Rubiera (ESP)	Kelme–Costa Blanca	+ 4' 23"
7	Manuel Beltrán (ESP)	Banesto	+ 5' 05"
8	Ángel Casero (ESP)	Vitalicio Seguros	+ 5' 19"
9	Leonardo Piepoli (ITA)	Banesto	+ 6' 00"
10	Iván Parra (COL)	Vitalicio Seguros	+ 8' 08"

== Stage 15 ==
20 September 1999 — La Sénia to Valencia, 193.4 km (120.2 mi)

Stage 15 result

Rank	Rider	Team	Time
1	Viatcheslav Ekimov (RUS)	Amica Chips–Costa de Almeria	4h 31' 44"
2	Frankie Andreu (USA)	U.S. Postal Service	s.t.
3	Paolo Bettini (ITA)	Mapei–Quick-Step	s.t.
4	Eddy Mazzoleni (ITA)	Saeco–Cannondale	s.t.
5	Pascal Hervé (FRA)	Festina–Lotus	s.t.
6	Cristian Moreni (ITA)	Liquigas	s.t.
7	Mariano Piccoli (ITA)	Lampre–Daikin	s.t.
8	Igor Flores (ESP)	Euskaltel–Euskadi	s.t.
9	Antonio Tauler (ESP)	Kelme–Costa Blanca	+ 9"
10	Miguel Ángel Martín Perdiguero (ESP)	ONCE–Deutsche Bank	+ 12' 46"

General classification after Stage 15

Rank	Rider	Team	Time
1	Jan Ullrich (GER)	Team Telekom	64h 03' 21"
2	Igor González de Galdeano (ESP)	Vitalicio Seguros	+ 49"
3	Roberto Heras (ESP)	Kelme–Costa Blanca	+ 2' 35"
4	José María Jiménez (ESP)	Banesto	+ 3' 35"
5	Pavel Tonkov (RUS)	Mapei–Quick-Step	+ 3' 45"
6	José Luis Rubiera (ESP)	Kelme–Costa Blanca	+ 4' 23"
7	Manuel Beltrán (ESP)	Banesto	+ 5' 05"
8	Ángel Casero (ESP)	Vitalicio Seguros	+ 5' 19"
9	Leonardo Piepoli (ITA)	Banesto	+ 6' 00"
10	Iván Parra (COL)	Vitalicio Seguros	+ 8' 08"

== Stage 16 ==
21 September 1999 — Valencia to Teruel, 200.4 km (124.5 mi)

Stage 16 result

Rank	Rider	Team	Time
1	Frank Vandenbroucke (BEL)	Cofidis	5h 20' 41"
2	Jon Odriozola (ESP)	Banesto	+ 3"
3	Francisco Cabello (ESP)	Kelme–Costa Blanca	+ 4' 44"
4	Andrei Zintchenko (RUS)	Vitalicio Seguros	s.t.
5	Oscar Camenzind (SUI)	Lampre–Daikin	s.t.
6	Michel Lafis (SWE)	TVM–Farm Frites	s.t.
7	Gianni Faresin (ITA)	Mapei–Quick-Step	+ 4' 46"
8	Aitor Osa (ESP)	Banesto	s.t.
9	Juan Carlos Vicario (ESP)	Fuenlabrada	+ 4' 49"
10	David García Marquina (ESP)	Vitalicio Seguros	+ 4' 58"

General classification after Stage 16

Rank	Rider	Team	Time
1	Jan Ullrich (GER)	Team Telekom	69h 36' 41"
2	Igor González de Galdeano (ESP)	Vitalicio Seguros	+ 49"
3	Roberto Heras (ESP)	Kelme–Costa Blanca	+ 2' 35"
4	José María Jiménez (ESP)	Banesto	+ 3' 35"
5	Pavel Tonkov (RUS)	Mapei–Quick-Step	+ 3' 45"
6	José Luis Rubiera (ESP)	Kelme–Costa Blanca	+ 4' 23"
7	Manuel Beltrán (ESP)	Banesto	+ 5' 05"
8	Ángel Casero (ESP)	Vitalicio Seguros	+ 5' 19"
9	Leonardo Piepoli (ITA)	Banesto	+ 6' 00"
10	Iván Parra (COL)	Vitalicio Seguros	+ 8' 08"

== Stage 17 ==
22 September 1999 — Bronchales to Guadalajara, 225 km (140 mi)

Stage 17 result

Rank	Rider	Team	Time
1	Cristian Moreni (ITA)	Liquigas	5h 33' 13"
2	José Vicente García Acosta (ESP)	Banesto	+ 2"
3	Mikel Zarrabeitia (ESP)	ONCE–Deutsche Bank	s.t.
4	Mariano Piccoli (ITA)	Lampre–Daikin	+ 5"
5	Antonio Tauler (ESP)	Kelme–Costa Blanca	s.t.
6	Davide Rebellin (ITA)	Team Polti	+ 7"
7	Andrea Tafi (ITA)	Mapei–Quick-Step	s.t.
8	Jaime Hernández (ESP)	Festina–Lotus	s.t.
9	Íñigo Chaurreau (ESP)	Euskaltel–Euskadi	+ 16"
10	Ramón González Arrieta (ESP)	Euskaltel–Euskadi	+ 28"

General classification after Stage 17

Rank	Rider	Team	Time
1	Jan Ullrich (GER)	Team Telekom	75h 26' 28"
2	Igor González de Galdeano (ESP)	Vitalicio Seguros	+ 49"
3	Roberto Heras (ESP)	Kelme–Costa Blanca	+ 2' 35"
4	José María Jiménez (ESP)	Banesto	+ 3' 35"
5	Pavel Tonkov (RUS)	Mapei–Quick-Step	+ 3' 45"
6	José Luis Rubiera (ESP)	Kelme–Costa Blanca	+ 4' 23"
7	Manuel Beltrán (ESP)	Banesto	+ 5' 05"
8	Leonardo Piepoli (ITA)	Banesto	+ 6' 00"
9	Iván Parra (COL)	Vitalicio Seguros	+ 8' 23"
10	Santiago Blanco (ESP)	Vitalicio Seguros	+ 9' 24"

== Stage 18 ==
23 September 1999 — Guadalajara to Alto de Abantos, 166.3 km (103.3 mi)

Stage 18 result

Rank	Rider	Team	Time
1	Roberto Laiseka (ESP)	Euskaltel–Euskadi	4h 18' 39"
2	Frank Vandenbroucke (BEL)	Cofidis	+ 17"
3	José María Jiménez (ESP)	Banesto	+ 21"
4	Roberto Heras (ESP)	Kelme–Costa Blanca	+ 36"
5	Igor González de Galdeano (ESP)	Vitalicio Seguros	+ 37"
6	Pavel Tonkov (RUS)	Mapei–Quick-Step	+ 52"
7	Manuel Beltrán (ESP)	Banesto	s.t.
8	Jan Ullrich (GER)	Team Telekom	+ 55"
9	Íñigo Cuesta (ESP)	ONCE–Deutsche Bank	s.t.
10	José Luis Rubiera (ESP)	Kelme–Costa Blanca	+ 1' 14"

General classification after Stage 18

Rank	Rider	Team	Time
1	Jan Ullrich (GER)	Team Telekom	79h 46' 02"
2	Igor González de Galdeano (ESP)	Vitalicio Seguros	+ 31"
3	Roberto Heras (ESP)	Kelme–Costa Blanca	+ 2' 16"
4	José María Jiménez (ESP)	Banesto	+ 3' 01"
5	Pavel Tonkov (RUS)	Mapei–Quick-Step	+ 3' 42"
6	José Luis Rubiera (ESP)	Kelme–Costa Blanca	+ 4' 42"
7	Manuel Beltrán (ESP)	Banesto	+ 5' 02"
8	Leonardo Piepoli (ITA)	Banesto	+ 6' 19"
9	Iván Parra (COL)	Vitalicio Seguros	+ 9' 09"
10	Santiago Blanco (ESP)	Vitalicio Seguros	+ 9' 45"

== Stage 19 ==
24 September 1999 — San Lorenzo de El Escorial to Ávila, 184.6 km (114.7 mi)

Stage 19 result

Rank	Rider	Team	Time
1	Frank Vandenbroucke (BEL)	Cofidis	4h 54' 18"
2	Mikel Zarrabeitia (ESP)	ONCE–Deutsche Bank	+ 13"
3	Roberto Heras (ESP)	Kelme–Costa Blanca	+ 20"
4	Pavel Tonkov (RUS)	Mapei–Quick-Step	s.t.
5	José María Jiménez (ESP)	Banesto	s.t.
6	Jan Ullrich (GER)	Team Telekom	s.t.
7	Igor González de Galdeano (ESP)	Vitalicio Seguros	s.t.
8	Leonardo Piepoli (ITA)	Banesto	+ 24"
9	Chann McRae (USA)	Mapei–Quick-Step	+ 1' 55"
10	José Luis Rubiera (ESP)	Kelme–Costa Blanca	s.t.

General classification after Stage 19

Rank	Rider	Team	Time
1	Jan Ullrich (GER)	Team Telekom	84h 40' 40"
2	Igor González de Galdeano (ESP)	Vitalicio Seguros	+ 31"
3	Roberto Heras (ESP)	Kelme–Costa Blanca	+ 2' 16"
4	José María Jiménez (ESP)	Banesto	+ 3' 01"
5	Pavel Tonkov (RUS)	Mapei–Quick-Step	+ 3' 42"
6	José Luis Rubiera (ESP)	Kelme–Costa Blanca	+ 6' 17"
7	Leonardo Piepoli (ITA)	Banesto	+ 6' 23"
8	Manuel Beltrán (ESP)	Banesto	+ 6' 37"
9	Iván Parra (COL)	Vitalicio Seguros	+ 10' 44"
10	Santiago Blanco (ESP)	Vitalicio Seguros	+ 11' 20"

== Stage 20 ==
25 September 1999 — El Tiemblo to Ávila, 46.5 km (28.9 mi) (ITT)

Stage 20 result

Rank	Rider	Team	Time
1	Jan Ullrich (GER)	Team Telekom	1h 04' 57"
2	Alex Zülle (SUI)	Banesto	+ 2' 50"
3	Frank Vandenbroucke (BEL)	Cofidis	+ 2' 57"
4	Melcior Mauri (ESP)	Sport Lisboa e Benfica	+ 3' 11"
5	Íñigo Cuesta (ESP)	ONCE–Deutsche Bank	+ 3' 38"
6	Roberto Heras (ESP)	Kelme–Costa Blanca	+ 3' 41"
7	Igor González de Galdeano (ESP)	Vitalicio Seguros	+ 3' 44"
8	José Luis Rubiera (ESP)	Kelme–Costa Blanca	+ 3' 56"
9	Pavel Tonkov (RUS)	Mapei–Quick-Step	+ 4' 10"
10	Andrei Zintchenko (RUS)	Vitalicio Seguros	+ 4' 15"

General classification after Stage 20

Rank	Rider	Team	Time
1	Jan Ullrich (GER)	Team Telekom	85h 45' 37"
2	Igor González de Galdeano (ESP)	Vitalicio Seguros	+ 4' 15"
3	Roberto Heras (ESP)	Kelme–Costa Blanca	+ 5' 57"
4	Pavel Tonkov (RUS)	Mapei–Quick-Step	+ 7' 53"
5	José María Jiménez (ESP)	Banesto	+ 9' 24"
6	José Luis Rubiera (ESP)	Kelme–Costa Blanca	+ 10' 13"
7	Manuel Beltrán (ESP)	Banesto	+ 11' 20"
8	Leonardo Piepoli (ITA)	Banesto	+ 13' 13"
9	Iván Parra (COL)	Vitalicio Seguros	+ 16' 20"
10	Santiago Blanco (ESP)	Vitalicio Seguros	+ 18' 15"

== Stage 21 ==
26 September 1999 — Madrid to Madrid, 163 km (101 mi)

Stage 21 result

Rank	Rider	Team	Time
1	Jeroen Blijlevens (NED)	TVM–Farm Frites	4h 06' 26"
2	Julian Dean (NZL)	U.S. Postal Service	s.t.
3	Paolo Bettini (ITA)	Mapei–Quick-Step	s.t.
4	Glenn Magnusson (SWE)	U.S. Postal Service	s.t.
5	Giancarlo Raimondi (ITA)	Liquigas	s.t.
6	Markus Zberg (SUI)	Rabobank	s.t.
7	Ángel Edo (ESP)	Kelme–Costa Blanca	s.t.
8	Serguei Smetanine (RUS)	Vitalicio Seguros	s.t.
9	Robert Hunter (RSA)	Lampre–Daikin	s.t.
10	Giovanni Lombardi (ITA)	Team Telekom	s.t.

General classification after Stage 21

Rank	Rider	Team	Time
1	Jan Ullrich (GER)	Team Telekom	89h 52' 03"
2	Igor González de Galdeano (ESP)	Vitalicio Seguros	+ 4' 15"
3	Roberto Heras (ESP)	Kelme–Costa Blanca	+ 5' 57"
4	Pavel Tonkov (RUS)	Mapei–Quick-Step	+ 7' 53"
5	José María Jiménez (ESP)	Banesto	+ 9' 24"
6	José Luis Rubiera (ESP)	Kelme–Costa Blanca	+ 10' 13"
7	Manuel Beltrán (ESP)	Banesto	+ 11' 20"
8	Leonardo Piepoli (ITA)	Banesto	+ 13' 13"
9	Iván Parra (COL)	Vitalicio Seguros	+ 16' 20"
10	Santiago Blanco (ESP)	Vitalicio Seguros	+ 18' 15"
