= 1999 Vuelta a España =

54th edition of the Vuelta a España

Race details
- Dates: 4–26 September
- Stages: 22
- Distance: 3,576 km (2,222 mi)
- Winning time: 89h 52' 03"

Results
Jersey awarded to the overall winner	Winner	Jan Ullrich (GER)	(Team Telekom)
	Second	Igor González de Galdeano (ESP)	(Vitalicio Seguros)
	Third	Roberto Heras (ESP)	(Kelme–Costa Blanca)
Jersey awarded to the points classification winner	Points	Frank Vandenbroucke (BEL)	(Cofidis)
Jersey awarded to the mountains classification winner	Mountains	José María Jiménez (ESP)	(Banesto)
Jersey awarded to the sprints classification winner	Sprints	Robert Hunter (RSA)	(Lampre–Daikin)
	Team	Banesto	

The 1999 Vuelta a España was the 54th edition of the Vuelta a España, taking place from 4 September starting in Murcia and finishing in Madrid on 26 September 1999. It consisted of 21 stages over 3,576 km (2,222 mi), ridden at an average speed of 39.449 km/h (24.512 mph). The favourites were Laurent Jalabert, Alex Zülle, Jan Ullrich and defending champion Abraham Olano. In the end, Ullrich won the race.

== Route ==
List of stages
Stage	Date	Course	Distance	Type	Winner
P	4 September	Murcia to Murcia	6.1 km (4 mi)	Individual time trial	Igor González de Galdeano (ESP)
1	5 September	Murcia to Benidorm	179 km (111 mi)		Robbie Hunter (RSA)
2	6 September	Alicante to Albacete	206 km (128 mi)		Marcel Wüst (GER)
3	7 September	La Roda to Fuenlabrada	229.5 km (143 mi)		Marcel Wüst (GER)
4	8 September	Las Rozas to Salamanca	185.6 km (115 mi)		Marcel Wüst (GER)
5	9 September	Béjar to Ciudad Rodrigo	160 km (99 mi)		Jan Ullrich (GER)
6	10 September	Salamanca to Salamanca	46.4 km (29 mi)	Individual time trial	Abraham Olano (ESP)
7	11 September	Salamanca to León	217 km (135 mi)		Marcel Wüst (GER)
8	12 September	León to Alto de l'Angliru	175.6 km (109 mi)		José María Jiménez (ESP)
9	13 September	Gijón to Los Corrales de Buelna	185.8 km (115 mi)		Laurent Brochard (FRA)
	14 September	Rest day			
10	15 September	Zaragoza to Zaragoza	183.2 km (114 mi)		Serhiy Ushakov (UKR)
11	16 September	Huesca to Val d'Aran/Pla de Beret	201 km (125 mi)		Daniele Nardello (ITA)
12	17 September	Sort to Arcalis (Andorra)	147.4 km (92 mi)		Igor González Galdeano (ESP)
13	18 September	Andorra la Vella (Andorra) to Castellar del Riu (Rasos de Peguera)	149 km (93 mi)		Alex Zülle (SUI)
14	19 September	Barcelona to Barcelona	94.4 km (59 mi)		Fabio Roscioli (ITA)
15	20 September	La Sénia to Valencia	193.4 km (120 mi)		Viatcheslav Ekimov (RUS)
16	21 September	Valencia to Teruel	200.4 km (125 mi)		Frank Vandenbroucke (BEL)
17	22 September	Bronchales to Guadalajara	225 km (140 mi)		Cristian Moreni (ITA)
18	23 September	Guadalajara to Alto de Abantos	166.3 km (103 mi)		Roberto Laiseka (ESP)
19	24 September	San Lorenzo de El Escorial to Ávila	184.6 km (115 mi)		Frank Vandenbroucke (BEL)
20	25 September	El Tiemblo to Ávila	46.5 km (29 mi)	Individual time trial	Jan Ullrich (GER)
21	26 September	Madrid to Madrid	163 km (101 mi)		Jeroen Blijlevens (NED)
	Total		3,576 km (2,222 mi)		

== Jersey progress ==
Stage	Winner	General classification	Points Classification	Mountains Classification	Intermediate Sprint Classification	Team Classification
Prol. (ITT)	Igor González de Galdeano	Igor González de Galdeano	N/A	N/A	N/A	N/A
1	Robert Hunter	Jacky Durand	Robert Hunter	Serguei Outschakov	Robert Hunter	ONCE–Deutsche Bank
2	Marcel Wüst	Jacky Durand	Robert Hunter	Pascal Hervé	César García	ONCE–Deutsche Bank
3	Marcel Wüst	Marcel Wüst	Marcel Wüst	Pascal Hervé	German Nieto	ONCE–Deutsche Bank
4	Marcel Wüst	Marcel Wüst	Marcel Wüst	Pascal Hervé	German Nieto	ONCE–Deutsche Bank
5	Jan Ullrich	Abraham Olano	Marcel Wüst	Laurent Brochard	German Nieto	ONCE–Deutsche Bank
6 (ITT)	Abraham Olano	Abraham Olano	Marcel Wüst	Laurent Brochard	German Nieto	ONCE–Deutsche Bank
7	Marcel Wüst	Abraham Olano	Marcel Wüst	Laurent Brochard	German Nieto	ONCE–Deutsche Bank
8	José María Jiménez	Abraham Olano	Marcel Wüst	José María Jiménez	German Nieto	Vitalicio Seguros
9	Laurent Brochard	Abraham Olano	Marcel Wüst	Laurent Brochard	Robert Hunter	Vitalicio Seguros
10	Serguei Outschakov	Abraham Olano	Marcel Wüst	Laurent Brochard	Robert Hunter	Vitalicio Seguros
11	Daniele Nardello	Abraham Olano	Marcel Wüst	Laurent Brochard	Robert Hunter	Vitalicio Seguros
12	Igor González de Galdeano	Jan Ullrich	Marcel Wüst	José María Jiménez	Robert Hunter	Vitalicio Seguros
13	Alex Zülle	Jan Ullrich	Marcel Wüst	José María Jiménez	Robert Hunter	Vitalicio Seguros
14	Fabio Roscioli	Jan Ullrich	Marcel Wüst	José María Jiménez	Robert Hunter	Vitalicio Seguros
15	Viatcheslav Ekimov	Jan Ullrich	Marcel Wüst	José María Jiménez	Robert Hunter	Vitalicio Seguros
16	Frank Vandenbroucke	Jan Ullrich	Marcel Wüst	José María Jiménez	Robert Hunter	Vitalicio Seguros
17	Cristian Moreni	Jan Ullrich	Robert Hunter	José María Jiménez	Robert Hunter	Vitalicio Seguros
18	Roberto Laiseka	Jan Ullrich	Igor González de Galdeano	José María Jiménez	Robert Hunter	Banesto
19	Frank Vandenbroucke	Jan Ullrich	Igor González de Galdeano	José María Jiménez	Robert Hunter	Banesto
20 (ITT)	Jan Ullrich	Jan Ullrich	Igor González de Galdeano	José María Jiménez	Robert Hunter	Banesto
21	Jeroen Blijlevens	Jan Ullrich	Frank Vandenbroucke	José María Jiménez	Robert Hunter	Banesto
Stage	Winner	Jan Ullrich	Frank Vandenbroucke	José María Jiménez	Robert Hunter	Banesto

== Results ==
=== Final General Classification ===
Rank	Rider	Team	Time
1	(Germany) Jan Ullrich	Team Telekom	89:52:03
2	(Spain) Igor González de Galdeano	Vitalicio Seguros	4:15
3	(Spain) Roberto Heras	Kelme–Costa Blanca	5:57
4	(Russia) Pavel Tonkov	Mapei–Quick-Step	7:53
5	(Spain) José María Jiménez	Banesto	9:24
6	(Spain) José Luis Rubiera	Kelme–Costa Blanca	10:13
7	(Spain) Manuel Beltrán	Banesto	11:20
8	(Italy) Leonardo Piepoli	Banesto	13:13
9	(Colombia) Iván Parra	Vitalicio Seguros	16:20
10	(Spain) Santiago Blanco	Vitalicio Seguros	18:15
11	(Spain) Mikel Zarrabeitia Uranga	ONCE-Deutsche Bank	22:06
12	(Belgium) Frank Vandenbroucke	Cofidis	23:39
13	(Spain) José Uria Gonzalez	Kelme–Costa Blanca	27:28
14	(Spain) Iñigo Chaurreau	Euskaltel–Euskadi	29:42
15	(Spain) Aitor Osa	Banesto	31:06
16	(Spain) Txema Del Olmo Zendegi	Euskaltel–Euskadi	31:49
17	(Spain) Félix García Casas	Festina–Lotus	36:34
18	(Spain) Roberto Laiseka	Euskaltel–Euskadi	40:14
19	(United States) Chann McRae	Mapei–Quick-Step	44:29
20	(Switzerland) Niki Aebersold	Rabobank	59:04
21	(Sweden) Michel Lafis	TVM–Farm Frites	59:43
22	(Italy) Massimo Codol	Lampre–Daikin	1:02:49
23	(Italy) Daniele Nardello	Mapei–Quick-Step	1:02:58
24	(Russia) Andrei Zintchenko	Vitalicio Seguros	1:04:08
25	(Italy) Gianni Faresin	Mapei–Quick-Step	1:06:26
26	(Spain) Melcior Mauri	Sport Lisboa Benfica	1:06:33
27	(Spain) Jon Odriozola	Banesto	1:11:15
28	(Spain) Juan Carlos Vicario Barberá	Fuenlabrada	1:11:25
29	(Italy) Andrea Tafi	Mapei–Quick-Step	1:14:08
30	(Switzerland) Markus Zberg	Rabobank	1:14:14
31	(Belgium) Kurt van de Wouwer	Lotto–Mobistar	1:14:20
32	(Italy) Paolo Bettini	Mapei–Quick-Step	1:15:09
33	(Germany) Grischa Niermann	Rabobank	1:15:10
34	(Spain) Marcos A. Serrano Rodríguez	ONCE-Deutsche Bank	1:20:53
35	(Germany) Jörg Jaksche	Team Telekom	1:23:29
36	(Italy) Nicola Miceli	Liquigas	1:25:36
37	(Switzerland) Alex Zülle	Banesto	1:30:18
38	(Germany) Rolf Aldag	Team Telekom	1:31:03
39	(Spain) David García Marquina	Vitalicio Seguros	1:31:32
40	(Spain) Oscar Lopez Uriarte	Sport Lisboa Benfica	1:33:16
41	(Italy) Andrea Noè	Mapei–Quick-Step	1:34:26
42	(Finland) Joona Laukka	Sport Lisboa Benfica	1:37:38
43	(France) Laurent Brochard	Lotus–Festina	1:38:39
44	(Spain) Pedro Díaz Lobato	Fuenlabrada	1:44:53
45	(Spain) Íñigo Cuesta	ONCE-Deutsche Bank	1:46:24
46	(Kazakhstan) Alexandr Shefer	Riso Scotti–Vinavil	1:46:41
47	(Spain) Toni Tauler	Kelme–Costa Blanca	1:47:32
48	(Switzerland) Oscar Camenzind	Lampre–Daikin	1:48:39
49	(Italy) Massimiliano Lelli	Cofidis	1:50:55
50	(Kazakhstan) Andrei Teteriouk	Liquigas	1:51:40
51	(Italy) Stefano Cattai	Team Polti	1:57:24
52	(Spain) Ramón González Arrieta	Euskaltel–Euskadi	1:58:12
53	(Spain) José Vincente Garcia	Banesto	2:00:15
54	(Italy) Cristian Moreni	Liquigas	2:01:29
55	(Russia) Viatcheslav Ekimov	Costa Almería–Amica Chips	2:02:26
56	(Spain) Álvaro González de Galdeano	Vitalicio Seguros	2:06:02
57	(Spain) Rafael Diaz Justo	ONCE-Deutsche Bank	2:08:22
58	(Italy) Mariano Piccoli	Lampre–Daikin	2:08:57
59	(Spain) Ángel Castresana	Euskaltel–Euskadi	2:12:15
60	(Italy) Eddy Mazzoleni	Saeco–Cannondale	2:14:27
61	(Spain) Miguel Ángel Martín Perdiguero	ONCE-Deutsche Bank	2:24:52
62	(Germany) Andreas Klöden	Team Telekom	2:29:06
63	(Netherlands) Jan Boven	Rabobank	2:31:31
64	(Russia) Serguei Smetanine	Vitalicio Seguros	2:36:30
65	(Spain) José Ramón Uriarte	Festina–Lotus	2:36:46
66	(Spain) César Solaun	Banesto	2:37:14
67	(Spain) Luis Pérez (cyclist)	ONCE-Deutsche Bank	2:37:22
68	(Italy) Salvatore Commesso	Saeco–Cannondale	2:38:36
69	(Netherlands) Bram de Groot	Rabobank	2:39:10
70	(Portugal) Quintino Fernandez Rodrigues	Sport Lisboa Benfica	2:41:39
71	(Spain) Alberto Lopez de Munain	Euskaltel–Euskadi	2:49:12
72	(South Africa) Robert Hunter	Lampre–Daikin	2:50:05
73	(Italy) Oscar Pozzi	Riso Scotti–Vinavil	2:51:02
74	(Germany) Andreas Klier	TVM–Farm Frites	2:52:38
75	(Spain) Iker Flores Galarza	Euskaltel–Euskadi	2:53:23
76	(Belgium) Paul Van Hyfte	Lotto–Mobistar	2:53:55
77	(Spain) Jaime Hernández	Festina–Lotus	2:55:50
78	(Italy) Fabio Roscioli	Costa Almería–Amica Chips	2:56:21
79	(Spain) Eleuterio Anguita	Fuenlabrada	2:57:00
80	(France) Pascal Hervé	Festina–Lotus	2:59:45
81	(Spain) Francisco Cabello Luque	Kelme–Costa Blanca	3:02:06
82	(Netherlands) Aart Vierhouten	Rabobank	3:02:30
83	(Belgium) Geert Van Bondt	TVM–Farm Frites	3:03:33
84	(Italy) Stefano Verziagi	Fuenlabrada	3:04:48
85	(Italy) Giovanni Lombardi	Team Telekom	3:05:26
86	(Italy) Rossano Brasi	Team Polti	3:08:49
87	(Germany) Ralf Grabsch	Team Telekom	3:09:35
88	(United States) Frankie Andreu	U.S. Postal Service	3:12:04
89	(Lithuania) Arnoldas Saprykinas	Riso Scotti–Vinavil	3:12:14
90	(Germany) Danilo Hondo	Team Telekom	3:12:33
91	(Sweden) Glenn Magnusson	U.S. Postal Service	3:13:59
92	(Spain) Matías Cagigas Amedo	Fuenlabrada	3:16:28
93	(Italy) Giuseppe Palumbo	Riso Scotti–Vinavil	3:18:21
94	(Netherlands) Servais Knaven	TVM–Farm Frites	3:20:34
95	(Spain) Ángel Edo	Kelme–Costa Blanca	3:21:16
96	(Spain) Andrés Bermejo Siller	Fuenlabrada	3:21:18
97	(Denmark) Frank Høj	U.S. Postal Service	3:22:28
98	(Venezuela) Unai Etxebarria	Euskaltel–Euskadi	3:22:29
99	(Netherlands) Remco van der Ven	TVM–Farm Frites	3:23:26
100	(Italy) Mario Traversoni	Saeco–Cannondale	3:23:42
101	(Spain) José Antonio Garrido	Sport Lisboa Benfica	3:24:31
102	(Germany) Dirk Baldinger	Team Telekom	3:24:33
103	(Italy) Giancarlo Raimondi	Liquigas	3:26:34
104	(Spain) Nieto Fernandez	Fuenlabrada	3:29:31
105	(Spain) Carlos Golbano	Costa Almería–Amica Chips	3:32:38
106	(Belgium) Koen Beeckman	Lotto–Mobistar	3:38:27
107	(Italy) Cristian Salvato	Team Polti	3:40:00
108	(Italy) Stefano Casagranda	Costa Almería–Amica Chips	3:43:54
109	(Italy) Alessandro Pozzi	Costa Almería–Amica Chips	3:44:40
110	(Spain) César Pérez Padrón	Fuenlabrada	3:45:32
111	(Italy) Marco Gili	Costa Almería–Amica Chips	3:49:00
112	(New Zealand) Julian Dean	U.S. Postal Service	3:53:13
113	(Spain) Daniel Bayes	Sport Lisboa Benfica	3:56:28
114	(Netherlands) Jeroen Blijlevens	TVM–Farm Frites	4:06:40
115	(Moldova) Igor Pugaci	Saeco–Cannondale	4:14:44

=== KOM Classification ===
	Cyclist	Team	Points
1	(Spain) José María Jiménez	BAN	133
2	(Belgium) Frank Vandenbroucke	Cofidis	90
3	(Spain) Roberto Heras	Kelme–Costa Blanca	89

=== Points Classification ===
	Cyclist	Team	Points
1	(Belgium) Frank Vandenbroucke	Cofidis	129
2	(South Africa) Robert Hunter	LAM	123
3	(Spain) Igor González Galdeano	Vitalicio Seguros	122

=== Team classification ===
	Team	Country	Time
1	Banesto	Spain	269.08.49
2	Kelme–Costa Blanca	Spain	15.04
3	Vitalicio Seguros	Spain	23.45
