= 2000 Vuelta a Asturias =

Road cycling stage race

Race details
- Dates: 9–14 May 2000
- Stages: 6
- Distance: 836.3 km (519.7 mi)
- Winning time: 21h 46' 33"

Results
Jersey awarded to the overall winner	Winner	Joseba Beloki (ESP)	(Festina)
	Second	Alberto López (ESP)	(Euskaltel–Euskadi)
	Third	Igor González de Galdeano (ESP)	(Vitalicio Seguros)
Jersey awarded to the points classification winner	Points	Ángel Edo (ESP)	(União Ciclista da Maia–MSS)
Jersey awarded to the mountains classification winner	Mountains	Andrei Zintchenko (RUS)	(LA Pecol)
Jersey awarded to the sprints classification winner	Sprints	Germán Nieto (ESP)	(Colchon Relax–Fuenlabrada)

The 2000 Vuelta a Asturias was the 44th edition of the Vuelta a Asturias road cycling stage race, which was held from 9 May to 14 May 2000. The race started and finished in Oviedo. The race was won by Joseba Beloki of the Festina team.

== General classification ==
Final general classification

Rank	Rider	Team	Time
1	Joseba Beloki (ESP)	Festina	21h 46' 33"
2	Alberto López (ESP)	Euskaltel–Euskadi	+ 21"
3	Igor González de Galdeano (ESP)	Vitalicio Seguros	+ 29"
4	José Azevedo (POR)	União Ciclista da Maia–MSS	+ 43"
5	Marcelino García (ESP)	ONCE–Deutsche Bank	+ 1' 05"
6	Roberto Heras (ESP)	Kelme–Costa Blanca	+ 1' 12"
7	Aitor Garmendia (ESP)	Banesto	+ 1' 13"
8	Íñigo Chaurreau (ESP)	Euskaltel–Euskadi	+ 1' 40"
9	Claus Michael Møller (DEN)	União Ciclista da Maia–MSS	+ 1' 48"
10	Nicola Miceli (ITA)	Alessio	+ 1' 49"
