= Castresana =

Castresana is a surname. Notable people with the surname include:

- Ángel Castresana (born 1972), Spanish cyclist
- Clara Pinedo Castresana (born 2003), Spanish footballer
