= 2000 Critérium du Dauphiné Libéré =

Race details
- Dates: 4–11 June 2000
- Stages: 7 + Prologue
- Distance: 1,163.3 km (722.8 mi)
- Winning time: 30h 22' 07"

Results
Jersey awarded to the overall winner	Winner	Tyler Hamilton (USA)	(U.S. Postal Service)
	Second	Haimar Zubeldia (ESP)	(Euskaltel–Euskadi)
	Third	~~Lance Armstrong~~	(~~U.S. Postal Service~~)
Jersey awarded to the points classification winner	Points	Tyler Hamilton (USA)	(U.S. Postal Service)
Jersey awarded to the mountains classification winner	Mountains	Íñigo Cuesta (ESP)	(ONCE–Deutsche Bank)

The 2000 Critérium du Dauphiné Libéré was the 52nd edition of the cycle race and was held from 4 June to 11 June 2000. The race started in Grenoble and finished in Sallanches. The race was won by Tyler Hamilton of the U.S. Postal Service team.

== Teams ==
Fourteen teams, containing a total of 112 riders, participated in the race:

- ONCE–Deutsche Bank
- U.S. Postal Service
- Festina
- Euskaltel–Euskadi
- Française des Jeux
- Banesto
- Crédit Agricole
- Lotto–Adecco
- BigMat–Auber 93
- Cofidis
- AG2R Prévoyance
- Bonjour
- Jean Delatour
- Kelme–Costa Blanca

== Route ==
Stage characteristics and winners
Stage	Date	Course	Distance	Type	Winner
P	4 June	Grenoble	3.6 km (2.2 mi)	Individual time trial	Alberto López de Munain (ESP)
1	5 June	Grenoble to Lyon	189 km (117 mi)		Frédéric Guesdon (FRA)
2	6 June	Châtillon-sur-Chalaronne to Saint-Étienne	210 km (130 mi)		Fabrice Gougot (FRA)
3	7 June	Saint-Étienne to Saint-Chamond	35.7 km (22.2 mi)	Individual time trial	~~Lance Armstrong (USA)~~ (Note: In 2012, Lance Armstrong was disqualified from his position in the race. He was also stripped of all results after 1 August 1998, as a result of a massive doping scheme.)
4	8 June	Romans-sur-Isère to Mont Ventoux	159 km (99 mi)		Tyler Hamilton (USA)
5	9 June	Beaumes-de-Venise to Digne-les-Bains	201 km (125 mi)		Tyler Hamilton (USA)
6	10 June	Digne-les-Bains to Briançon	218 km (135 mi)		Íñigo Cuesta (ESP)
7	11 June	Saint-Jean-de-Maurienne to Sallanches	147 km (91 mi)		Laurent Jalabert (FRA)

== General classification ==
Final general classification

Rank	Rider	Team	Time
1	Tyler Hamilton (USA)	U.S. Postal Service	30h 22' 07"
2	Haimar Zubeldia (ESP)	Euskaltel–Euskadi	+ 31"
~~3~~	~~Lance Armstrong (USA)~~	~~U.S. Postal Service~~	~~+ 36"~~
4	Alex Zülle (SUI)	Banesto	+ 1' 42"
5	Jonathan Vaughters (USA)	Crédit Agricole	+ 2' 56"
6	Christophe Moreau (FRA)	Festina	+ 3' 36"
7	Mikel Pradera (ESP)	Euskaltel–Euskadi	+ 3' 56"
8	Peter Luttenberger (AUT)	ONCE–Deutsche Bank	+ 4' 44"
9	Andrey Kivilev (KAZ)	AG2R Prévoyance	+ 5' 07"
10	Ramón González Arrieta (ESP)	Euskaltel–Euskadi	+ 5' 21"
