= 2001 Ronde van Nederland =

Dutch cycling race

These are the results for the 41st edition of the Ronde van Nederland cycling race, which was held from August 28 to September 1, 2001. The race started in Rotterdam and finished in Landgraaf.

== Final classification ==
RANK	NAME CYCLIST	TEAM	TIME
1.	Léon van Bon (NED)	Mercury	21:47:31
2.	Erik Dekker (NED)	Rabobank	+ 0.06
3.	Sergei Gontchar (UKR)	Liquigas-Pata	+ 0.27
4.	Paul Van Hyfte (BEL)	Lotto-Adecco	+ 0.42
5.	Bart Voskamp (NED)	Bankgiroloterij-Batavus	+ 0.53
6.	Jan van Velzen (NED)	Bankgiroloterij-Batavus	+ 1.03
7.	Vjatceslav Ekimov (RUS)	US Postal Service	+ 1.06
8.	Maarten den Bakker (NED)	Rabobank	+ 1.11
9.	Robert Hunter (RSA)	Lampre-Daikin	+ 1.16
10.	Frank Høj (DEN)	Team Coast	+ 1.37
