= 2001 Critérium du Dauphiné Libéré =

Race details
- Dates: 10–17 June 2001
- Stages: 7 + Prologue
- Distance: 1,097 km (682 mi)
- Winning time: 28h 24' 10"

Results
Jersey awarded to the overall winner	Winner	Christophe Moreau (FRA)	(Festina)
	Second	Pavel Tonkov (RUS)	(Mercury–Viatel)
	Third	Benoît Salmon (FRA)	(AG2R Prévoyance)
Jersey awarded to the points classification winner	Points	Glenn Magnusson (SWE)	(U.S. Postal Service)
Jersey awarded to the mountains classification winner	Mountains	Sven Montgomery (SUI)	(Française des Jeux)
	Combination	Pavel Tonkov (RUS)	(Mercury–Viatel)

The 2001 Critérium du Dauphiné Libéré was the 53rd edition of the cycle race and was held from 10 June to 17 June 2001. The race started in Morzine and finished in Chambéry. The race was won by Christophe Moreau of the Festina team.

== Teams ==
Thirteen teams, containing a total of 104 riders, participated in the race:

- Euskaltel–Euskadi
- iBanesto.com
- Crédit Agricole
- Festina
- AG2R Prévoyance
- Lotto–Adecco
- Bonjour
- Jean Delatour
- Cofidis
- Domo–Farm Frites–Latexco
- Française des Jeux
- Mercury–Viatel
- BigMat–Auber 93

== Route ==
Stage characteristics and winners
Stage	Date	Course	Distance	Type	Winner
P	10 June	Morzine to Avoriaz	4 km (2.5 mi)	Individual time trial	Didier Rous (FRA)
1	11 June	Morzine to Bron	227 km (141 mi)		Fabien De Waele (BEL)
2	12 June	Bron to Firminy	170 km (110 mi)		Laurent Roux (FRA)
3	13 June	Guilherand-Granges to Carpentras	184 km (114 mi)		Unai Etxebarria (VEN)
4	14 June	Beaumes-de-Venise to Valréas	43 km (27 mi)	Individual time trial	Jonathan Vaughters (USA)
5	15 June	Romans-sur-Isère to Grenoble	151 km (94 mi)		Andrey Kivilev (KAZ)
6	16 June	Pontcharra to Briançon	193 km (120 mi)		Iban Mayo (ESP)
7	17 June	Vizille to Chambéry	125 km (78 mi)		Jens Voigt (GER)

== General classification ==
Final general classification

Rank	Rider	Team	Time
1	Christophe Moreau (FRA)	Festina	28h 24' 10"
2	Pavel Tonkov (RUS)	Mercury–Viatel	+ 1"
3	Benoît Salmon (FRA)	AG2R Prévoyance	+ 2' 01"
4	Sven Montgomery (SUI)	Française des Jeux	+ 2' 51"
5	Andrey Kivilev (KAZ)	Cofidis	+ 3' 57"
6	Unai Etxebarria (VEN)	Euskaltel–Euskadi	+ 4' 26"
7	Denis Menchov (RUS)	iBanesto.com	+ 5' 18"
8	Íñigo Chaurreau (ESP)	Euskaltel–Euskadi	+ 6' 30"
9	Ramon González (ESP)	Euskaltel–Euskadi	+ 6' 44"
10	Leonardo Piepoli (ITA)	iBanesto.com	+ 7' 14"
