= Tour de Mumbai =

Defunct Cycling Event

Race details
- Date: February
- Region: Maharashtra, India
- English name: Tour of Mumbai
- Discipline: Road
- Competition: UCI Asia Tour 1.1
- Type: Classic one-day race

History
- First edition: 2010
- Editions: 2 (as of 2022)
- Final edition: 2011
- First winner: Juan José Haedo (ARG)
- Final winner: I: Elia Viviani (ITA); II: Robert Hunter (RSA)

The Tour de Mumbai (also known as Mumbai Cyclothon) was an annual professional road bicycle racing classic one-day race held in Maharashtra, India, named after Mumbai. It is classified by the International Cycling Union (UCI) as a 1.1 category race as part of the UCI Asia Tour.

== Past winners ==
=== Mumbai Cyclothon ===
- 2010: Juan José Haedo (ARG)

=== Mumbai Cyclothon I ===
- 2011: Elia Viviani (ITA)

=== Mumbai Cyclothon II ===
- 2011: Robert Hunter (RSA)
