= Pavel Tonkov =

Russian cyclist

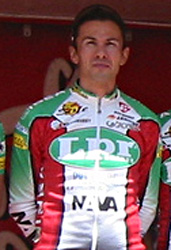
- Tonkov in 2005

Personal information
- Full name: Pavel Sergeyevich Tonkov
- Nickname: The Tsar
- Born: 9 February 1969 (age 57) Izhevsk, Soviet Union

Cycling career
- Sport: Cycling
- Current team: Retired
- Discipline: Road
- Role: Rider
- Rider type: All-rounder

Professional teams
- 1992: Russ
- 1992–1995: Lampre
- 1996: Ceramiche Panaria–Vinavil
- 1997–2000: Mapei
- 2001: Mercury–Viatel
- 2002: Lampre–Daikin
- 2003: CCC-Polsat
- 2004: Vini Caldirola-Nobili Rubinetterie
- 2005: Team LPR

Major wins
- Grand Tours Giro d'Italia General classification (1996) Young rider classification (1992, 1993) 7 individual stages (1996, 1997, 1998, 2002, 2004) Vuelta a España 2 individual stages (1997) Stage Races Tour de Suisse (1995) Tour de Romandie (1997)

Pavel Sergeyevich Tonkov (Павел Сергеевич Тонков; born 9 February 1969) is a former professional road racing cyclist from Russia. His talents were first showcased when winning the world junior title as part of the Soviet Union team in 1987. This alerted the world to his talents, and he turned pro in 1992 with the RUSS-Baïkal team.

== Professional career ==
His biggest success was the overall win in the 1996 Giro d'Italia. He went on to place 2nd in the following two editions of the Italian race and all total he placed in the top 5 of the Giro on seven occasions. He also had two top 5 performances in the Vuelta and while he entered the Tour de France on three occasions he never completed one.

He won the 1995 Tour de Suisse and the 1997 Tour de Romandie. He placed 3rd overall in the 2000 Vuelta a España.

Throughout much of his career, he was a client of the controversial Michele Ferrari.

He retired in 2005.

== Personal life ==
He lives in Córdoba, Spain, where he manages a hotel.

== Career achievements ==
=== Major results ===
1987
1st Road race, UCI Junior Road World Championships
1989
1st Overall Tour du Poitou-Charentes et de la Vienne

1st Stage 2 (ITT)

1st Overall Okolo Slovenska

1st Stage 7

1990
1st Stage 7a Peace Race
1992
7th Overall Giro d'Italia

1st Young rider classification

10th Giro dell'Emilia
1993
5th Overall Giro d'Italia

1st Young rider classification

5th Overall Tour de Suisse

1st Stage 4

9th Overall Tour de Romandie
1994
2nd Overall Grand Prix du Midi Libre

1st Stage 1

4th Overall Giro d'Italia
8th Overall Tour de Romandie
9th Overall Vuelta a Murcia
10th Trofeo Pantalica
1995
1st Overall Tour de Suisse

1st Combination classification
1st Stage 7

4th Overall Giro del Trentino
6th Overall Giro d'Italia
6th Chrono des Nations
9th Overall Tour de Romandie
1996
1st Overall Giro d'Italia

1st Stage 13

1st Stage 1 Tour de Romandie
2nd Giro dell'Appennino
9th Overall Escalada a Montjuïc
1997
1st Overall Tour de Romandie

1st Stage 4

1st Giro dell'Appennino
Vuelta a España

1st Stages 13 & 15

2nd Overall Giro d'Italia

1st Stages 3 (ITT), 5 & 21

2nd Overall Giro del Trentino
5th Overall Volta a Catalunya
7th Trofeo dello Scalatore
8th Overall Tour of Galicia
1998
1st Giro dell'Appennino
2nd Overall Giro d'Italia

1st Stage 18

9th Overall Tour de Romandie
1999
1st Luk-Cup Bühl
2nd Giro dell'Appennino
4th Overall Vuelta a España
9th Tre Valli Varesine
10th Overall Tour de Romandie
2000
2nd Road race, National Road Championships
3rd Overall Vuelta a España
5th Overall Giro d'Italia
6th Luk-Cup Bühl
9th Overall Tour of Galicia
10th Overall Volta a Catalunya
2001
1st Mountains classification, Tour of the Basque Country
2nd Overall Critérium du Dauphiné

1st Combination classification

3rd Classique des Alpes
5th Overall Euskal Bizikleta
2002
5th Overall Giro d'Italia

1st Stage 17

6th Overall Tour de Suisse
2003
3rd Giro dell'Appennino
2004
1st Stage 17 Giro d'Italia
5th Overall Giro del Trentino
8th Giro dell'Appennino
2005
1st Overall Clasica Alcobendas

1st Mountains classification
1st Stage 1

8th Subida al Naranco
9th Giro dell'Appennino

=== Grand Tour general classification results timeline ===
Grand Tour	1992	1993	1994	1995	1996	1997	1998	1999	2000	2001	2002	2003	2004
Giro d'Italia	7	5	4	6	1	2	2	—	5	—	5	DNF	13
Tour de France	—	—	DNF	DNF	—	—	—	DNF (Note: Tonkov did not start Stage 17 due to a death in his family.)	—	—	—	—	—
Vuelta a España	—	—	—	—	—	DNF	—	4	3	—	67	—	DNF

Legend
—	Did not compete
DNF	Did not finish
