= Koen Beeckman =

Belgian cyclist

Personal information
- Born: 2 September 1973 (age 53) Wetteren, Belgium

Cycling career
- Sport: Cycling
- Current team: Retired
- Discipline: Road
- Role: Rider

Professional teams
- 1996–1998: Ipso–Asfra
- 1999–2000: Lotto–Mobistar
- 2001: CSC–Tiscali

Koen Beeckman (born 2 September 1973) is a Belgian former professional road cyclist. He rode for the teams Ipso–Asfra, Lotto–Mobistar, and CSC–Tiscali. He rode in the 1999 Vuelta a España, and finished 106th overall.

== Major results ==
1997
4th Le Samyn
1998
1st Stadsprijs Geraardsbergen
2nd Overall Circuit Franco-Belge
3rd Omloop van het Waasland
8th Grand Prix de Denain
1999
3rd Nationale Sluitingprijs
10th GP de la Ville de Villers
2001
7th Overall Étoile de Bessèges
