= Ángel Castresana =

Spanish cyclist

Personal information
- Full name: Ángel Castresana del Val
- Born: 29 February 1972 (age 54) Medina de Pomar, Spain

Cycling career
- Sport: Cycling
- Current team: Retired
- Discipline: Road
- Role: Rider

Professional teams
- 1994: Cafe La Brasileña
- 1997: Estepona en Marcha
- 1998–2001: Euskaltel–Euskadi
- 2002–2003: ONCE–Eroski
- 2004–2006: Mr. Bookmaker–Palmans–Collstrop

Ángel Castresana del Val (born 29 February 1972) a Spanish former cyclist.

== Major results ==
2001
1st Stage 4 Vuelta al Pais Vasco
2002
5th Prueba Villafranca de Ordizia
2003
8th La Flèche Wallonne
2005
4th Polynormande

=== Grand Tour general classification results timeline ===
| Grand Tour | 1998 | 1999 | 2000 | 2001 |
|---|---|---|---|---|
| Giro d'Italia | — | — | — | — |
| Tour de France | — | — | — | 103 |
| Vuelta a España | 24 | 59 | — | — |

Legend
| — | Did not compete |
| DNF | Did not finish |
