= Oscar Pozzi =

Italian cyclist

Personal information
- Born: December 27, 1971 (age 54) Lecco, Italy

Cycling career
- Sport: Cycling
- Current team: Retired
- Discipline: Road
- Role: Rider

Professional teams
- 1997–1998: Asics–CGA
- 1999: Riso Scotti
- 2000: Amica Chips–Tacconi Sport
- 2001–2002: Fassa Bortolo
- 2003–2004: Tenax

Oscar Pozzi (born 27 December 1971 in Lecco) is a former Italian racing cyclist. He rode in 9 Grand Tours.

== Major results ==
1992
3rd Giro del Canavese
1994
2nd Giro d'Abruzzo
1995
3rd Gran Premio Capodarco
1996
1st Gran Premio Industria e Commercio Artigianato Carnaghese
2nd Giro d'Abruzzo

1st stage 4

1998
10th Grand Prix de Plouay
1999
2nd Gran Premio Industria e Commercio Artigianato Carnaghese
2000
4th Coppa Ugo Agostoni
