= Serguei Outschakov =

Ukrainian cyclist

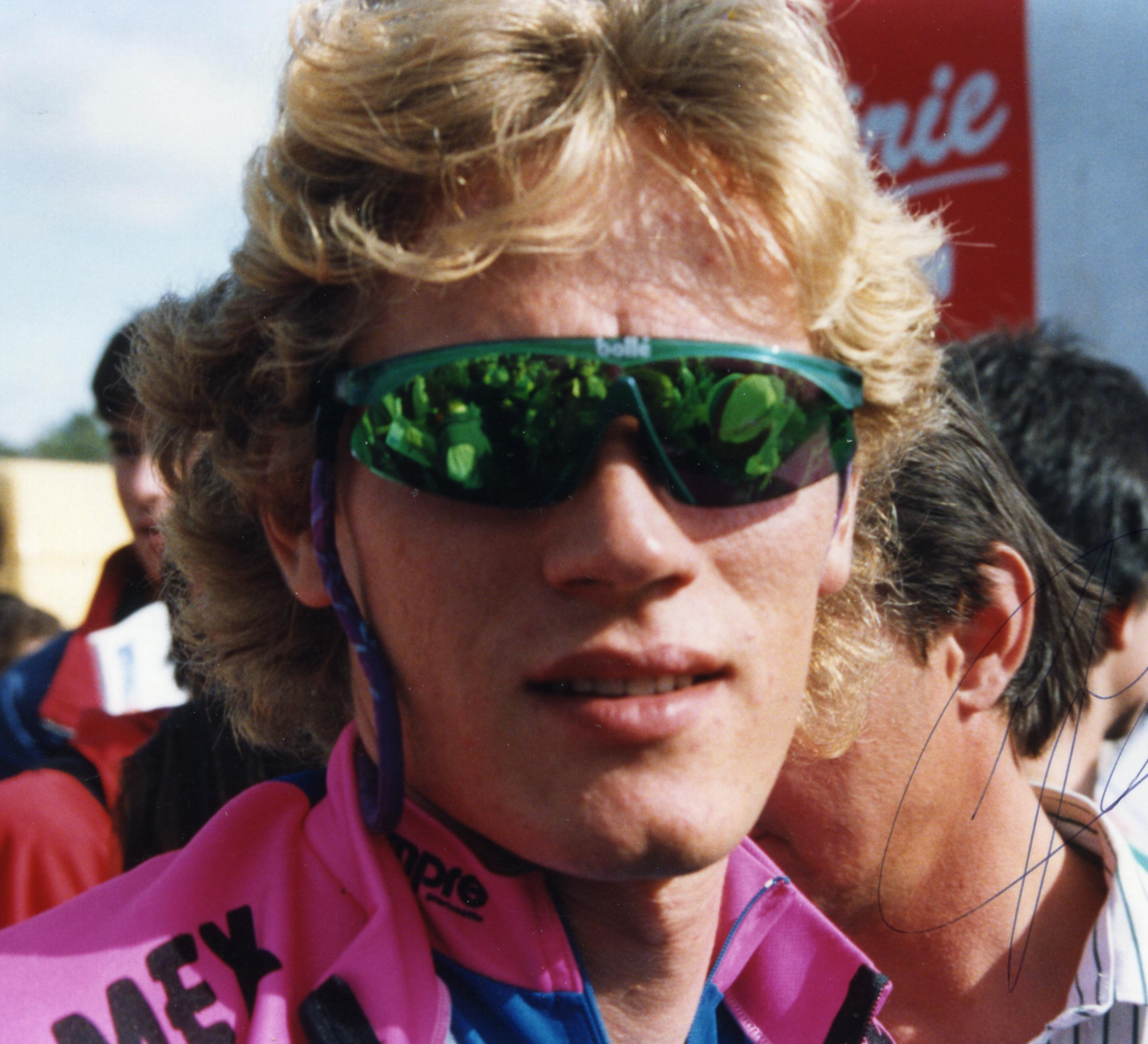

Personal information
- Full name: Serguei Outschakov
- Born: 11 May 1968 (age 58) Arkhangelsk, Soviet Union
- Height: 1.79 m (5 ft 10 in)
- Weight: 73 kg (161 lb; 11 st 7 lb)

Cycling career
- Sport: Cycling
- Current team: Retired
- Discipline: Road
- Role: Rider

Professional teams
- 1993: Lampre–Polti
- 1994–1997: Team Polti
- 1998–1999: TVM–Farm Frites
- 2000: Alessio
- 2000–2001: Alexia Alluminio
- 2002: CCC–Polsat

Major wins
- Grand Tours Tour de France 1 individual stage (1995) Giro d'Italia 2 individual stages (1995, 1996) Vuelta a España 2 individual stages (1993, 1999)

Serguei Outschakov (born 11 May 1968 in Arkhangelsk) is a Ukrainian former road bicycle racer.

== Biography ==
He won stages in all three Grand Tours. In 1997 Tour de France he finished first in the 11th stage but was relegated to third place for not holding his line in the final sprint. His Tour de France stage victory came in 1995 when he and Lance Armstrong broke away and Outschakov won in the sprint. According to the ESPN “30 for 30” documentary, “Lance”, the loss to Outschakov was the impetus for Armstrong’s decision to start taking erythropoietin.

== Major results ==
1988
1st Stage 9 Olympia's Tour
1990
1st Stage 5b (ITT) Giro delle Regioni
1992
1st Giro del Mendrisiotto
1993
1st Stage 18 Vuelta a España
1994
1st Acht van Chaam
1995
1st Stage 13 Tour de France
1st Stage 20 Giro d'Italia
1st Overall Étoile de Bessèges

1st Stages 2 & 4 (ITT)

1st Profronde van Surhuisterveen
8th Overall Volta a la Comunitat Valenciana
10th Overall Paris–Nice
1996
1st Stage 22 Giro d'Italia
6th Veenendaal–Veenendaal
1997
1st GP Chiasso
1st Stages 3 & 8 Volta a Catalunya
1st Stage 6 Vuelta y Ruta de Mexico
2nd Châteauroux Classic
4th Gent–Wevelgem
7th Milan–San Remo
1999
1st Stage 10 Vuelta a España
1st Stage 4 Sachsen Tour
2002
1st Stage 2 Euskal Bizikleta

=== Grand Tour general classification results timeline ===
Grand Tour	1993	1994	1995	1996	1997	1998	1999
Giro d'Italia	—	21	73	77	94	DNF	—
Tour de France	97	63	74	DNF	113	DNF	—
/ Vuelta a España	50	—	DNF	DNF	—	DNF	DNF
