= Paul Van Hyfte =

Belgian cyclist

Personal information
- Born: 19 January 1972 (age 54) Eeklo, Belgium

Cycling career
- Sport: Cycling
- Current team: Retired
- Discipline: Road
- Role: Rider

Professional teams
- 1994: Vlaanderen 2002–Eddy Merckx
- 1995–2001: Lotto–Isoglass
- 2002–2003: CSC–Tiscali
- 2004: Vlaanderen–T Interim

Paul van Hyfte (born 19 January 1972) is a Belgian former professional road bicycle racer. He is a former rider at the Danish professional cycling team, CSC–Tiscali from 2002 to 2003. He left the team after 2003 and joined a Belgian team, Vlaanderen-T Interim for his final season in 2004.

In the 2015 Tour of Flanders, van Hyfte was named as driving a Shimano neutral service vehicle which rear-ended the FDJ team car as it slowed to attend to Sylvain Chavanel.

== Major results ==
1989
3rd Time trial, National Junior Road Championships
1990
National Junior Road Championships

1st Road race
2nd Time trial

1995
8th Grand Prix Cerami
1996
9th Grand Prix de Wallonie
1997
6th GP Stad Zottegem
6th Overall Tour de Wallonie
9th Overall Route du Sud
1998
1st GP Stad Zottegem
2nd Route Adélie
10th HEW Cyclassics
1999
8th Druivenkoers Overijse
2000
5th Henk Vos Memorial
6th Classic Haribo
7th Overall Étoile de Bessèges
9th Grand Prix d'Isbergues
2001
1st Kampioenschap van Vlaanderen
1st Schaal Sels
3rd Classic Haribo
4th Overall Circuit Franco-Belge
4th Overall Ronde van Nederland
8th Omloop Het Volk
9th Grand Prix d'Isbergues
2002
6th Overall Tour Down Under
9th Grand Prix d'Ouverture La Marseillaise
2003
8th Overall Sachsen-Tour
2004
2nd Overall Ster Elektrotoer
5th Overall Tour de Wallonie
8th Classic Loire Atlantique
