= Lampre =

Italian-based steel production company

- Company type: Private
- Industry: Steel industry
- Founded: 1975; 51 years ago
- Founder: Romeo Mario Galbusera
- Headquarters: Usmate Velate, Italy
- Products: Pre-coated sheet metal
- Website: www.lampre.com

Lampre is an Italian company based in Lombardy, founded in 1975, specializing in pre-coated steel production. The company's name is a contraction of Lamiere prerivestite (pre-coated sheet metal), its flagship product.

The Lampre Group operates four production facilities in Italy through its subsidiaries Lampre Srl, Lamital, and Lamifer, primarily located in Lombardy. Outside Italy, it has factories in Portugal, Belgium and Poland, along with service center in Turkey and commercial subsidiaries in the United States and India.

== Lampre as a sponsor of cycling ==
Lampre was the former leading sponsor of a professional Italian cycling team with the same name. Lampre appeared on the cycling jersey of a professional team for the first time in 1991. In 1993, the team won the Milan–San Remo with Maurizio Fondriest, and the overall UCI Road World Cup. In 1999, in partnership with Daikin, Oscar Camenzind wore the World Champion jersey. In 2001, Gilberto Simoni won the Giro d'Italia for Lampre–Daikin. After two seasons in which Lampre was main sponsor of the team driven by Giuseppe Saronni, the Galbusera family decided to amalgamate with other sponsors in order to follow the UCI ProTour project: from the union between the Lampre group and the Saeco group was born team Lampre–Caffita, with champions such as Damiano Cunego and Gilberto Simoni. In 2006 a new partnership started: Fondital became the new main partner of Lampre. Fondital heads a European Group that designs and produces aluminium radiators.

=== Early 1990s ===
Lampre first entered cycling in 1991, co-sponsoring the Colnago–Lampre team. They took over the lead name in 1992, until the end of 1995. In 1996, they stopped sponsoring the team, although it continued to race under the name Ceramica Panaria–Vinavil.

=== Lampre–Daikin ===
Lampre re-entered cycling in 1999, sponsoring the Italian-based Lampre-Daikin team. Daikin remained a co-sponsor until the end of 2002 at the height of Lance Armstrong's zenith, when Raimondas Rumšas's wife was caught during the Tour de France with performance-enhancing drugs in the front seat of her car.

=== Lampre in the UCI ProTour ===
At the end of 2004, Lampre merged with Saeco to form a new cycling team ready for the UCI ProTour. Lampre merged with Saeco at the end of the 2004 season to create a new team ready for the UCI ProTour.
