= Alberto López de Munain =

Spanish cyclist

Personal information
- Full name: Alberto López de Munain Ruiz de Gauna
- Born: 5 December 1972 (age 53) Vitoria-Gasteiz, Spain

Cycling career
- Sport: Cycling
- Current team: Retired
- Discipline: Road
- Role: Rider

Professional team
- 1996–2005: Equipo Euskadi

Alberto López de Munain Ruiz de Gauna (born 5 December 1972) is a Spanish former professional road bicycle racer. He became professional in 1996 and ended his professional career in 2005. He rode his entire career for the Euskaltel–Euskadi team.

During the 2005 Giro d'Italia, he suffered a terrible crash on stage two, and was diagnosed with a hydropneumothorax caused by nine broken ribs, a broken left clavicle, a broken shoulder blade and damage to his left shoulder. He did not race professionally afterwards.

== Major results ==
1997
8th Overall Euskal Bizikleta
1999
6th Subida al Naranco
2000
1st Prologue Critérium du Dauphiné Libéré
2nd Overall Vuelta a Asturias

1st Stage 1

2001
1st Stage 5 Vuelta a Asturias
1st Stage 2 Clásica de Alcobendas
2003
3rd Subida al Naranco
3rd Subida a Urkiola
10th Overall Critérium du Dauphiné Libéré
2004
7th Overall Volta a Catalunya

=== Grand Tour general classification results timeline ===
Grand Tour	1999	2000	2001	2002	2003	2004	2005
Giro d'Italia	—	—	—	—	—	—	DNF
Tour de France	—	—	77	—	98	—	—
Vuelta a España	71	30	129	65	—	91	—

Legend
—	Did not compete
DNF	Did not finish
