= Dylan Casey =

American cyclist (born 1971)

Personal information
- Full name: Dylan Casey
- Born: April 13, 1971 (age 55) Walnut Creek, California, U.S.

Cycling career
- Sport: Cycling
- Discipline: Road
- Role: Rider

Professional teams
- 1996: Higher Gear Spinery
- 1997: Plymouth-Elsworth
- 1998: Shaklee
- 1999 - 2002: US Postal Service

Dylan Casey (born April 13, 1971, in Walnut Creek, California) is an American retired professional cyclist, who rode for U.S. Postal Service alongside Lance Armstrong. His career began in 1990 and ended in 2003. Over that time, Casey won 12 major races with a team or on his own. He also competed in the Sydney Olympics and won a gold medal at the 1999 Pan American Games. He is a 2 time Professional National Time Trial Champion and in 1999 won National Championships for both the Time Trial and Individual Pursuit; one of only 3 Americans to ever do so. Casey served as a Product Manager at Google, (2003-2011) during which time he helped design their social offering Google+ as well as their famous black bar. Casey left Google for Path in early December 2011. He joined Yahoo! as a Senior Director of Consumer Platforms in May, 2013.

In 2000, Casey became an Olympian when he went to the Olympic Games in Sydney, Australia. Unfortunately, an injury kept him out of actually competing. The year before he won a gold medal in individual pursuit at the 1999 Pan Am Games.

Casey has stage wins from the 1997 Tour of Ohio and 89er Stage Race and the 1998 Tour of Tucson, which he also won overall. In 1999, Casey came in third overall at the Tour of the Netherlands, sixth at the First Union Invitational and competed at the Tour of Spain. Stage wins in 2000 included one each at the Redlands Classic, the Tour of Luxembourg, and the Four Days of Dunkerque.

Born and raised in California, Casey graduated from Las Lomas High School in Walnut Creek, CA in 1989. He then went on graduate from the University of California, Santa Barbara with a B.S. in communications information systems in 1994

== Major results ==
2000
Olympic Games (Sydney): USA team member
1st - World Cup #2 (Cali, Colombia - track): individual pursuit; 3rd, team pursuit
1st - Stage Four Days of Dunkirk
1st - Stage Tour of Luxembourg
1st - Stage of Redlands Bicycle Classic
5th - Stage Three Days of Panne
5th - U.S. Olympic Team Trials for Road Cycling (Jackson, Miss.) road race
9th - Four Days of Dunkirk (France- op U.S. rider)
12th -Mercury Sea Otter Classic (Monterey, Calif.)
UCI World Track Cup rankings: sixth, individual pursuit

1999
1st - Pan American Games (Winnipeg, Canada): individual pursuit (track)
4th - Pan American Games (Winnipeg, Canada): individual time trial
2nd - Redlands (Calif.) Bicycle Classic
2nd - Stage of Tour of the Netherlands
3rd - Tour of the Netherlands (top.U.S. rider)
6th - First Union Invitational
11th - Redlands (Calif.) Bicycle Classic

1998
1st - USCF National Road Cycling Championships (Cincinnati, OH): individual time trial
1st - EDS National Track Cycling Championships (Frisco, TX): individual pursuit;
3rd - EDS National Track Cycling Championships (Frisco, TX): team pursuit
1st - Tour of Tucson
1st - Berkeley (Calif.) Road Race
1st - EDS Track Cup #1 (Carson, CA): individual pursuit
3rd - EDS Track Cup #1 (Carson, CA): points race
5th - Nevada City (Calif.) Cycle Classic
8th - World Track Cycling Championships (Bordeaux, France), individual pursuit
11th - Tour de ‘Toona (PA)
46th - World Road Cycling Championship (Valkenburg, The Netherlands)

1997
1st - USPRO Criterium sprint
1st - Tour de Town
1st - Tour of Ohio
3rd - First Union Grand Prix
Two stage wins - 89er Stage Race (OK)

1996
1st - Cat’s Hill Criterium

1995
4th - National Amateur Points Series

1993
1st - National Collegiate Road Cycling Championships (Boston): team time trial
