= Kurt Van De Wouwer =

Belgian cyclist

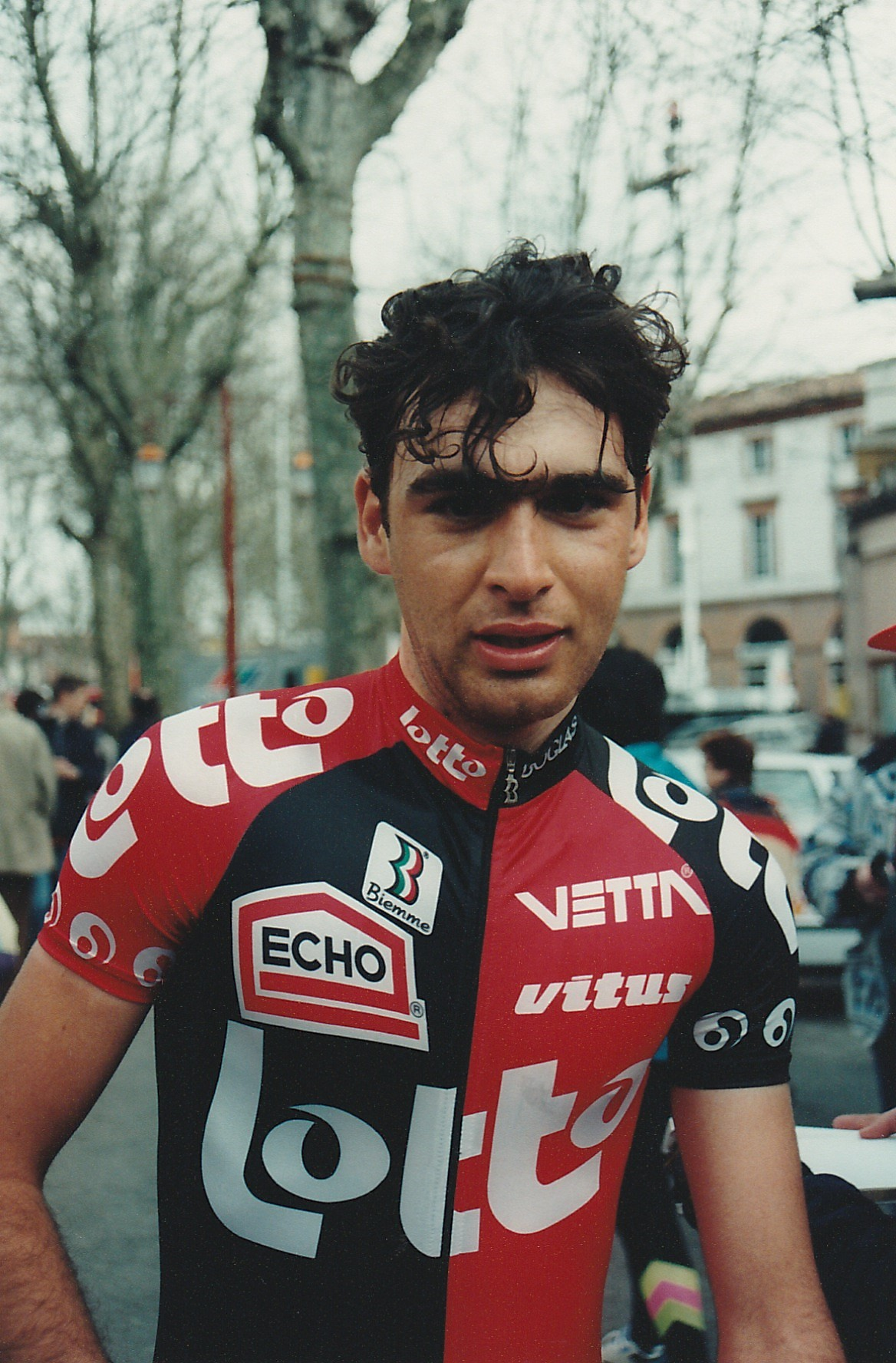
- Van De Wouwer in 1994

Personal information
- Full name: Kurt Van De Wouwer
- Born: 24 September 1971 (age 55) Herentals, Belgium

Cycling career
- Sport: Cycling
- Current team: Lotto–Intermarché Ladies
- Discipline: Road
- Role: Rider

Professional teams
- 1993–1996: Lotto
- 1997: Vlaanderen 2002–Eddy Merckx
- 1998–2002: Lotto–Mobistar
- 2003: Quick-Step–Davitamon
- 2004–2005: Mr. Bookmaker
- 2006: Unibet.com

Managerial team
- 2021–: Lotto–Soudal Ladies

Major wins
- 1997 Circuito Montañés

Kurt Van De Wouwer (born 24 September 1971 in Herentals) is a Belgian former professional road bicycle racer who raced between 1993 and 2006. He now works as a directeur sportif for UCI Women's Continental Team Lotto–Intermarché Ladies.

== Major results ==
1988
1st Road race, National Novice Road Championships
1997
1st Overall Circuito Montañés
Hofbrau Cup

1st Prologue & Stage 3

3rd Road race, National Road Championships
2000
3rd Grand Prix de Wallonie

=== Grand Tour general classification results timeline ===
Grand Tour	1998	1999	2000	2001	2002	2003
Giro d'Italia	—	—	—	—	26	—
Tour de France	16	11	17	DNF	—	62
Vuelta a España	—	31	—	—	—	66

Legend
—	Did not compete
DNF	Did not finish
