= Ramón González Arrieta =

Spanish cyclist

Ramón Gonzalez
Personal information
- Full name: José Ramón Gonzalez Arrieta
- Born: 12 May 1967 (age 59) Bilbao, Spain

Cycling career
- Sport: Cycling
- Current team: Retired
- Discipline: Road
- Role: Rider

Professional teams
- 1990–1993: Lotus–Festina
- 1994–1997: Banesto
- 1998–2001: Euskaltel–Euskadi

Major wins
- Classique des Alpes (1995)

José Ramón Gonzalez Arrieta (born 12 May 1967 in Bilbao) is a Spanish former road bicycle racer. He is the husband of former road bicycle racer Joane Somarriba Arrola.

== Major results ==
1990
6th Overall Tour of Galicia
8th Overall Vuelta a Cantabria
1993
9th La Flèche Wallonne
1994
3rd Subida a Urkiola
1995
1st Classique des Alpes
7th Overall Route du Sud
1996
2nd Subida al Naranco
1998
8th Overall Vuelta a Asturias
2000
5th Overall Route du Sud
5th Classique des Alpes
10th Overall Critérium du Dauphiné Libéré
2001
9th Overall Critérium du Dauphiné Libéré
