= Iván Parra =

Colombian road bicycle racer

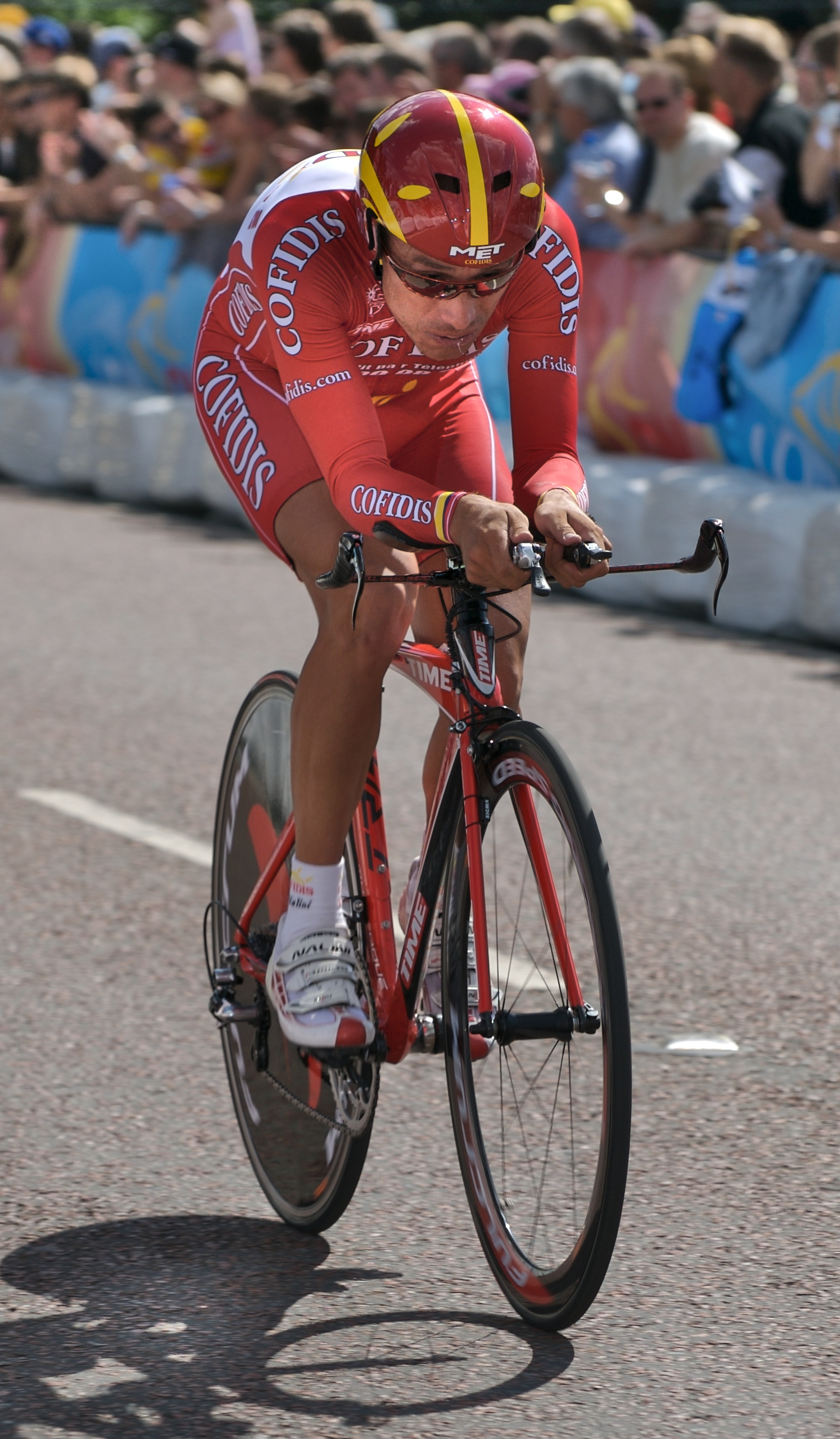

Personal information
- Full name: Iván Ramiro Parra Pinto
- Born: 14 October 1975 (age 51) Sogamoso, Colombia
- Height: 1.74 m (5 ft 9 in)
- Weight: 62 kg (137 lb)

Cycling career
- Sport: Cycling
- Current team: Retired
- Disciplines: Mountain biking; Road
- Role: Rider
- Rider type: Climbing specialist

Amateur teams
- 2009: Lotería de Boyacá
- 2010: GW–Shimano
- 2013–2015: Formesán–Bogotá Humana

Professional teams
- 1998: Petróleos de Colombia
- 1999–2000: Vitalicio Seguros
- 2001–2002: ONCE–Eroski
- 2003–2004: Kelme–Costa Blanca
- 2004: Cafes Baque
- 2005: Colombia–Selle Italia
- 2006–2007: Cofidis
- 2008: Colombia es Pasión–Coldeportes
- 2011–2012: EPM–UNE

Major wins
- Grand Tours Giro d'Italia 2 individual stages (2005) One-day races and Classics National Time Trial Championships (2005)

Iván Ramiro Parra Pinto (born 14 October 1975 in Sogamoso) is a Colombian former road bicycle racer, who competed professionally for Petróleos de Colombia, Vitalicio Seguros, ONCE–Eroski, Comunidad Valenciana–Kelme, Cafes Baque, Colombia–Selle Italia, Cofidis, Colombia es Pasión–Coldeportes and EPM–UNE. Parra comes from a Colombian cycling family. His father, Humberto was a successful in the Vuelta a Colombia, his eldest brother was the Colombian climber Fabio Parra who won stages in the Tour de France and the Vuelta a España in the 1980s. His other brother (named after his father) Humberto was also a professional cyclist for several years.

Parra started cycling as a mountain bike rider and was the Colombian national MTB champion in 1994. He represented Colombia internationally as a mountain biker but changed to road racing. In 1998 he came second in the Vuelta a Colombia. In 1999 he came to ride in the European peloton. In 2005 while riding for the UCI Professional Continental team Colombia–Selle Italia, Parra won two back-to-back stages of the Giro d'Italia.

== Career highlights ==
=== Major results ===
1998
2nd Overall Vuelta a Colombia
1999
9th Overall Vuelta a España
2000
1st Stage 5 Volta a Galega
2004
6th Overall Volta a Catalunya
10th Overall Vuelta Ciclista de Chile
2005
1st Time trial, National Road Championships
Giro d'Italia

1st Stages 13 & 14

2006
1st Mountains classification Tour de Romandie
2008
8th Overall Vuelta a Colombia
2013
4th Overall Vuelta a Colombia

=== Grand Tour general classification results timeline ===
Grand Tour	1999	2000	2001	2002	2003	2004	2005	2006	2007
Giro d'Italia	—	DNF	—	—	—	—	20	16	13
Tour de France	—	—	—	—	46	—	—	42	DNF
Vuelta a España	9	59	—	—	—	34	—	—	—

Legend
DSQ	Disqualified
DNF	Did not finish
