= Frank Høj =

Danish cyclist (born 1973)

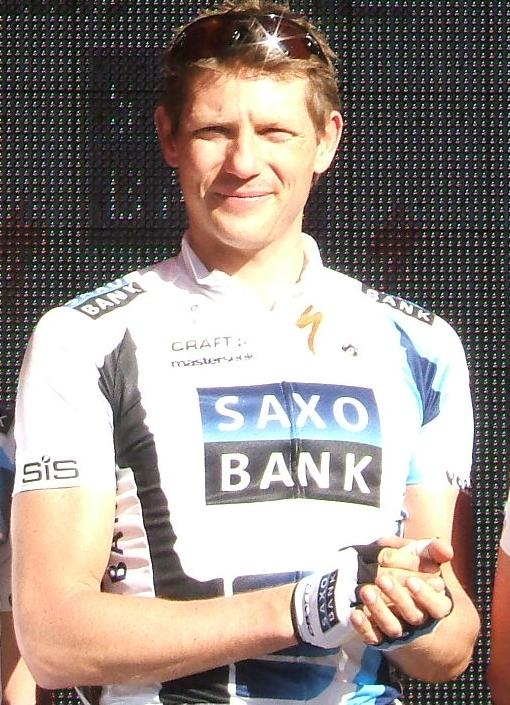

Personal information
- Full name: Frank Høj
- Born: 4 January 1973 (age 53) Holte, Denmark
- Height: 1.86 m (6 ft 1 in)
- Weight: 80 kg (176 lb)

Cycling career
- Sport: Cycling
- Discipline: Road
- Role: Rider

Amateur team
- 1994: Zetelhallen–Vosschemie (stagiaire)

Professional teams
- 1995–1997: Collstrop–Lystex
- 1998: Palmans–Ideal
- 1999: U.S. Postal Service
- 2000: Française des Jeux
- 2001–2002: Team Coast
- 2003: Team Fakta
- 2004: Team CSC
- 2005–2006: Gerolsteiner
- 2007–2008: Cofidis
- 2009–2010: Team Saxo Bank

Major wins
- Veenendaal–Veenendaal (1998); Circuit Franco-Belge (1998)

Frank Høj (born 4 January 1973) is a Danish retired professional road bicycle racer. Høj started as a stagiaire for the Zetelhallen–Vosschemie team in 1994, and became professional in 1995 for Collstrop–Lystex. His first win as a professional came the year after. In a live interview with Danish media station TV2 during the coverage of Tour de France 2015, Høj admitted to have used EPO in the early periods of his career, namely 1995–1998. He also competed at the 2000 Summer Olympics and the 2004 Summer Olympics.

== Career achievements ==
=== Major results ===
1993
1st Stage 1 Milk Race
1994
1st Zellik–Galmaarden
1st Omloop van de Westhoek
1st Stage 3 Circuit Franco-Belge
5th Kampioenschap van Vlaanderen
1995
1st Stage 5 Tour de l'Avenir
1st Stage 3 Tour de Slovénie
2nd Driedaagse van West-Vlaanderen
5th Overall Danmark Rundt
5th GP Stad Zottegem
1996
1st Metas Volantes Competition, Vuelta a Andalucía
3rd Overall Circuit Franco-Belge
6th Le Samyn
10th Kampioenschap van Vlaanderen
1997
1st Omloop van de Westkust
1st Grote Prijs Stad Zottegem
2nd GP Aarhus
3rd Grand Prix Herning
5th Grand Prix d'Isbergues
6th Druivenkoers Overijse
1998
1st Road race, National Road Championships
1st Overall Circuit Franco-Belge
1st Veenendaal–Veenendaal
2nd Grand Prix d'Isbergues
3rd Brussels–Ingooigem
4th Kampioenschap van Vlaanderen
1999
4th Overall Danmark Rundt
2000
1st Grand Prix Fayt-Le-Franc
2nd Paris–Brussels
6th Road race, Summer Olympics
6th Ronde van Midden-Zeeland
8th Overall Driedaagse van De Panne-Koksijde
9th Grand Prix de Wallonie
2001
6th Overall Danmark Rundt

1st Combativity competition

8th Overall Sachsen-Tour
10th Overall Ronde van Nederland
10th Kuurne–Brussels–Kuurne
2002
2nd Omloop Het Volk
10th Overall Danmark Rundt
2003
1st GP S.A.T.S.
2nd Overall Sachsen Tour
5th GP de Fourmies
6th Grote Prijs Jef Scherens
7th Overall Danmark Rundt
9th Scheldeprijs
2004
1st GP S.A.T.S.
2nd Time trial, National Road Championships
5th Overall Driedaagse van West-Vlaanderen
5th Overall Tour of Qatar
6th Overall Ronde van Nederland
8th Road race, Summer Olympics
8th Tour of Flanders
10th Paris–Roubaix
2005
4th Overall Circuit Franco-Belge

1st Stage 3

2006
4th Overall Sachsen-Tour
7th Paris–Tours
2008
2nd Time trial, National Road Championships
2009
3rd Road race, National Road Championships

=== Grand Tour general classification results timeline ===
Grand Tour	1999	2000	2001	2002	2003	2004	2005
Giro d'Italia	—	—	—	107	DNF	—	152
Tour de France	—	100	—	—	—	—	—
Vuelta a España	97	—	128	—	—	112	—

Legend
DSQ	Disqualified
DNF	Did not finish
