= Íñigo Chaurreau =

Spanish cyclist

Iñigo Chaurreau
Personal information
- Full name: Iñigo Chaurreau Bernárdez
- Born: April 14, 1973 (age 53) Pasaia, Spain
- Height: 1.72 m (5 ft 7 1/2 in)
- Weight: 60 kg (132 lb; 9 st 6 lb)

Cycling career
- Sport: Cycling
- Current team: Retired
- Discipline: Road
- Role: Rider

Professional teams
- 1995–1997: Polti–Granarolo–Santini
- 1998–2001: Euskaltel–Euskadi
- 2002–2006: AG2R Prévoyance

Major wins
- Spanish National Road Race Championships (2003)

Íñigo Chaurreau Bernárdez (born April 14, 1973 in Pasaia) is a Spanish former professional cyclist. His cousin Mikel Astarloza also competed professionally.

== Major results ==
1994
3rd Overall Circuito Montañés
1995
10th Clasica de Sabiñánigo
1999
5th Subida al Naranco
8th Overall Volta ao Alentejo
9th Overall Grande Prémio Jornal de Notícias
2000
1st Mountains classification Vuelta a La Rioja
5th Overall Euskal Bizikleta
8th Overall Vuelta a Asturias
2001
8th Overall Criterium du Dauphiné Libére
9th Overall Route du Sud
2003
1st Time trial, National Road Championships
6th Overall Critérium du Dauphiné Libéré
6th Classique des Alpes
10th Overall Tour de Romandie
10th Subida al Naranco
2005
4th Overall Criterium des Espoirs
8th Overall Rheinland-Pfalz-Rundfahrt

=== Grand Tour general classification results timeline ===
Grand Tour	1995	1996	1997	1998	1999	2000	2001	2002	2003	2004	2005	2006
Giro d'Italia	—	—	—	—	—	—	—	—	—	—	—	54
Tour de France	—	—	92	—	—	—	12	41	30	—	—	—
Vuelta a España	84	29	—	28	14	DNF	—	DNF	—	55	—	26
