= Pedro Díaz (cyclist) =

Spanish cyclist

Personal information
- Full name: Pedro Díaz Lobato
- Born: 1 May 1973 (age 53) Madrid, Spain

Cycling career
- Sport: Cycling
- Current team: Retired
- Discipline: Road
- Role: Rider

Amateur team
- 1995: ONCE (stagiaire)

Professional teams
- 1999–2000: Fuenlabrada
- 2001–2004: Jazztel–Costa de Almería

Pedro Díaz Lobato (born 31 May 1973) is a Spanish former road racing cyclist. Professional from 1999 to 2004, he notably won a stage of the 2003 Vuelta a España.

== Major results ==
1999
1st Stage 9 Vuelta a la Argentina
2001
1st Stage 1 Vuelta a Andalucía
2003
1st Stage 18 Vuelta a España
1st Memorial Manuel Galera

=== Grand Tour general classification results timeline ===
Grand Tour	1999	2000	2001	2002	2003
Giro d'Italia	—	—	—	—	—
Tour de France	—	—	—	—	—
Vuelta a España	44	46	122	—	117

Legend
—	Did not compete
DNF	Did not finish
