= Igor González de Galdeano =

Spanish cyclist

Personal information
- Full name: Igor González de Galdeano Aranzábal
- Nickname: Speedy González
- Born: 1 November 1973 (age 53) Vitoria-Gasteiz, Spain

Cycling career
- Sport: Cycling
- Current team: Retired
- Discipline: Road
- Role: Rider (retired); Team manager
- Rider type: Time trialist Climber

Professional teams
- 1995–1998: Equipo Euskadi
- 1999–2000: Vitalicio Seguros
- 2001–2005: ONCE–Eroski

Managerial teams
- 2006–2011: Euskaltel–Euskadi
- 2013: Euskaltel–Euskadi

Major wins
- Grand Tours Tour de France 1 TTT stage (2002) Vuelta a España 3 individual stages (1999, 2001) 2 TTT stages (2002, 2003) One-day races and Classics National Time Trial Championships (2002)
Medal record
Representing Spain
Men's road bicycle racing
World Championships
Bronze medal – third place	2002 Zolder	Time trial

Igor González de Galdeano Aranzábal (born 1 November 1973) is a Spanish former professional road bicycle racer and most recently, the team manager of UCI ProTeam Euskaltel–Euskadi. Following a promising start to his career at Vitalicio Seguros, where he finished the 1999 Vuelta a España in second place, González de Galdeano became a key rival of Lance Armstrong in the middle of his Tour de France supremacy. In the 2002 Tour de France, González de Galdeano wore the yellow jersey for seven days and in the 2003 Vuelta a España wore the gold jersey for one day. At an average speed of 55.17 km/h, González de Galdeano also holds the record for the fastest stage win in the Vuelta a España, a feat which earned him the nickname Speedy González.

== Early racing career ==
González de Galdeano turned professional in 1995 with the Basque team Equipo Euskadi, which at the time was only in its second year of racing and suffering from financial hardship. During his three seasons at Euskadi, González de Galdeano achieved two stage victories and a number of sprints and mountains classifications. For the 1999 season, González de Galdeano moved on to the Spanish Vitalicio Seguros team, and it was in this season that González de Galdeano made a name for himself on the domestic racing scene. Early in the season, González de Galdeano won stage five and finished fifth in the general classification of the Tirreno–Adriatico and adding three more top ten placings in regional Spanish stage races through the season.

Yet, González de Galdeano saved his best for the Vuelta a España in September. González de Galdeano won two stages – a 6 km prologue around Murcia and a mountain stage which finished in Arcalis, Andorra. Despite his excellent time-trialling skills, González de Galdeano eventually missed out on claiming the overall victory of the race when he lost nearly four minutes to the eventual race winner Jan Ullrich on the penultimate stage, a time-trial, and so finished second. González de Galdeano also missed out on the points classification on the final stage when, having taken a lead into the final day, Frank Vandenbroucke was able to breakaway from the peloton and claim the points in intermediate sprints.

== ONCE and the Armstrong rivalry ==
Following a lacklustre 2000 season and the demise of the Vitalicio Seguros squad, González de Galdeano moved to one of the top Spanish teams in ONCE–Eroski, run by Manolo Saiz. ONCE targeted the Tour de France as well as the Vuelta a España, so González de Galdeano was able to start his first Tour in 2001. ONCE had a fresh look in this 88th edition of the Tour: Laurent Jalabert and Abraham Olano were gone and the new team leader was Joseba Beloki, who had finished third the previous year for Festina. It was in this Tour that González de Galdeano first demonstrated his excellent time-trialling skills to the world beyond Spain, placing second in both the short prologue around Dunkirk and also the 61 km test from Montlucon to Saint Amand Montrond. González de Galdeano ultimately finished fifth in the Tour and helped Beloki to a second consecutive third place. González de Galdeano also had another good Vuelta, placing fourth in the first stage time-trial and winning a road stage into Zaragoza, breaking clear in the final kilometre to win the fastest ever stage in the Vuelta a España at 55.176 km/h and hence coining his nickname, Speedy González.

In 2002, with an increasing reputation as a time-triallist who was competent in the mountains, González de Galdeano formed a small rivalry with Lance Armstrong, the 1993 World Cycling Champion and already three-time winner of the Tour. In the GP Midi Libre, González de Galdeano beat Armstrong in the time-trial and, following an intense ride by Armstrong in the mountains, eventually finished second in the general classification to him. Battle was resumed at the Tour de France, when in the team time trial ONCE-Eroski beat Armstrong's U.S. Postal Service squad by 16 seconds to be clear of the American by 7 seconds. González de Galdeano was able to retain the yellow jersey of race leader for seven stages. Although Armstrong did overhaul González de Galdeano and Beloki to claim his fourth Tour, ONCE improved their performance over the previous year: Beloki moved up a step on the podium to second and was clearly Armstrong's principal threat, González de Galdeano once again finished fifth, and with strong riding from team mate José Azevedo, who finished sixth, ONCE was able to claim the team competition. González de Galdeano also added the Spanish national time trial and the overall classification in the Deutschland Tour to his record, along with a bronze medal in the world time trial championships in Zolder.

A doping ban prevented González de Galdeano from taking part in the 2003 Tour de France. González de Galdeano was adjudicated by the French authorities to have doped, for his use of the asthma drug salbutamol. However, the UCI did not count this as a positive test so no sanction was applied. However, the French authorities took a more stringent line and prevented him for racing on French soil for six months, over the period of the Tour. Also, González de Galdeano had a good showing at the Deutschland Tour, finishing second on the fifth stage. However, on the penultimate stage, he crashed and broke his collarbone. As such, the planned appeal against the French ban became academic and González de Galdeano had to wait for the Vuelta. The 2003 Vuelta proved to be González de Galdeano's last Grand Tour as a leading protagonist. González de Galdeano went into the Vuelta as ONCE team leader, however, young team mate Isidro Nozal rode well throughout, until the penultimate stage, a time trial in which he lost over two minutes to Roberto Heras, the eventual race winner. González de Galdeano finished fourth overall.

== Retirement and post-racing career ==
By the time the 2004 Vuelta had started, González de Galdeano had fallen to the role of domestique for new team leader Heras and his lieutenant Nozal. González de Galdeano retired on his 32nd birthday, on 1 November 2005. He stated that he decided to retire at this relatively young age as "I realized in the last Tour de France that I lost my motivation."

As of 2006, González de Galdeano combined studying at Basque Institute of Physical Education (IVEF) with being a technical secretary at the Euskaltel-Euskadi team, where he had started his professional career in 1995. At Euskaltel, González de Galdeano's brief was to manage the team's training and to schedule the team's itineraries through the season.

== Major results ==
1994
6th Time trial, UCI World Junior Championships
1995
6th Overall Tour de l'Avenir
1996
7th Overall Vuelta a La Rioja
1997
1st Stage 4 Vuelta a los Valles Mineros
9th Overall Vuelta a La Rioja

1st Stage 1b

10th Subida al Naranco
1998
1st Clásica de Sabiñánigo
1st Stage 5 Tour of Galicia
4th Overall Vuelta a Murcia
1999
2nd Overall Vuelta a España

1st Prologue & Stage 12
Held after Prologue
Held after Stages 18–20

3rd Overall Vuelta a La Rioja
4th Overall Volta a Galega
5th Overall Tirreno–Adriatico

1st Stage 5

5th Overall Vuelta a Aragon
6th Overall Vuelta a Burgos
8th Trofeo Sóller
10th GP Miguel Induráin
2000
2nd Overall Euskal Bizikleta
3rd Overall Vuelta a Asturias
4th Overall Vuelta a Aragon
5th Overall Vuelta a Burgos
7th Overall Vuelta a Castilla y León
7th Gran Premio de Llodio
8th Subida a Urkiola
9th Overall Giro del Trentino
2001
1st Overall Gran Premio Mosqueteros-Ruta del Marqués

1st Stage 4

1st Stage 9 Vuelta a España
1st Stage 3 Vuelta a Asturias
2nd Overall Volta a Catalunya

1st Stage 1 (TTT)

3rd Overall Euskal Bizikleta
5th Overall Tour de France
2002
1st Time trial, National Road Championships
1st Overall Deutschland Tour
1st Stage 1 (TTT) Vuelta a España
2nd Overall Grand Prix du Midi Libre

1st Stage 3 (ITT)

3rd Time trial, UCI Road World Championships
3rd Karlsruher Versicherungs Grand Prix (with Joseba Beloki)
5th Overall Tour de France

1st Stage 4 (TTT)
Held after Stages 4–10

7th Overall Escalada a Montjuïc
2003
4th Overall Vuelta a España

1st Stage 1 (TTT)
Held, & after Stage 1

6th Overall Escalada a Montjuïc
2004
3rd Time trial, National Road Championships
4th Overall Deutschland Tour
6th Overall Vuelta a Castilla y León
8th Time trial, Olympic Games

=== Grand Tours general classification results timeline ===
Grand Tour	1995	1996	1997	1998	1999	2000	2001	2002	2003	2004	2005
Giro d'Italia	Did not contest during career										
Tour de France	—	—	—	—	—	—	5	5	—	44	DNF
/ Vuelta a España	—	106	42	DNF	2	DNF	DNF	DNF	4	96	90

Legend
—	Did not compete
DNF	Did not finish

== See also ==
- List of doping cases in cycling
- List of sportspeople sanctioned for doping offences
