= Robbie Hunter (cyclist) =

South African cyclist (born 1977)

Robert Hunter
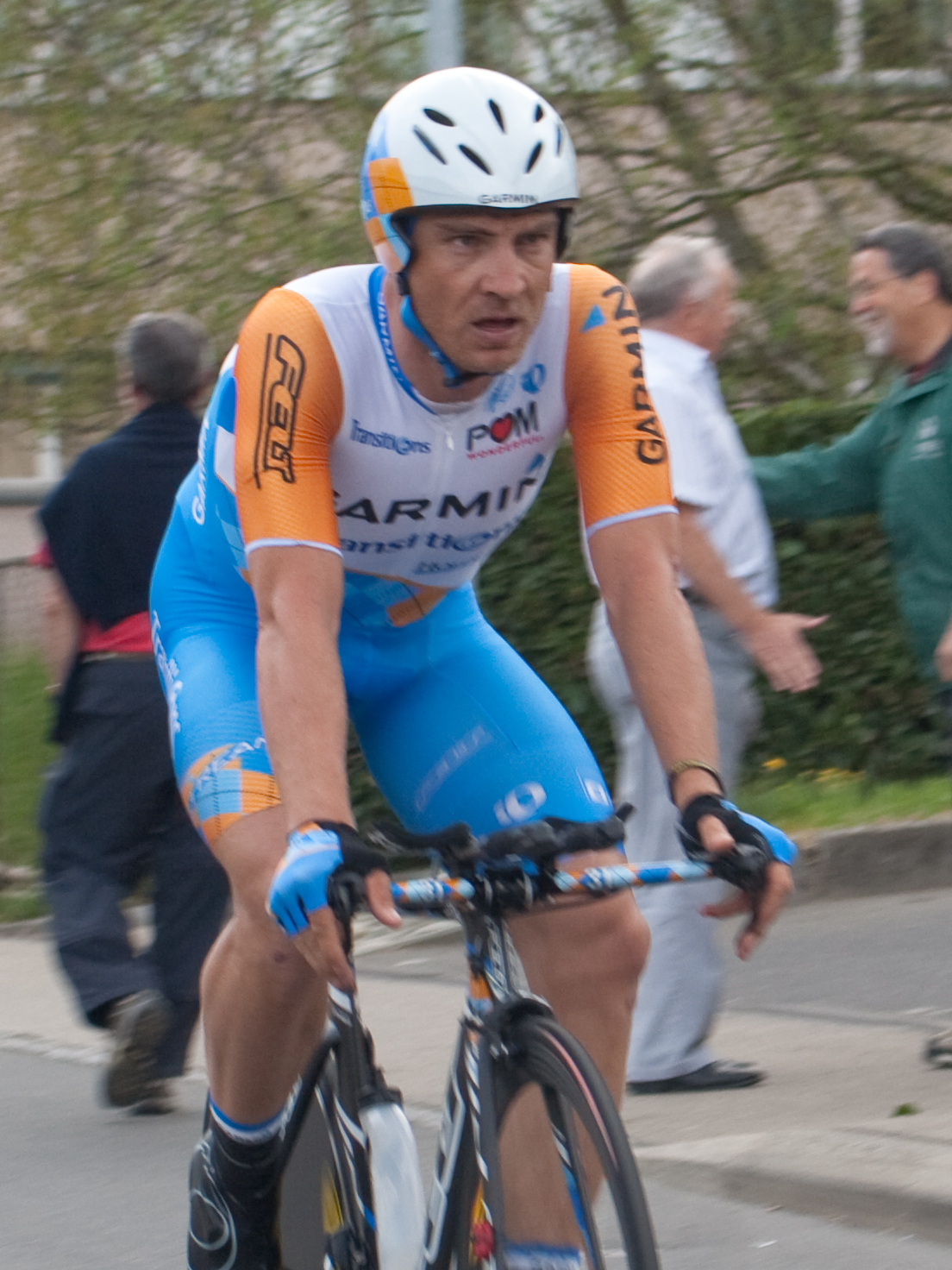
- Hunter at the 2010 Tour de Romandie

Personal information
- Full name: Robert Hunter
- Nickname: Robbie
- Born: 22 April 1977 (age 49) Johannesburg, Gauteng, South Africa
- Height: 1.78 m (5 ft 10 in)
- Weight: 72 kg (159 lb)

Cycling career
- Sport: Cycling
- Current team: EF Education–EasyPost
- Discipline: Road
- Role: Rider (retired); Directeur sportif
- Rider type: Sprinter

Professional teams
- 1999–2001: Lampre–Daikin
- 2002: Mapei–Quick-Step
- 2003–2004: Rabobank
- 2005–2006: Phonak
- 2007–2009: Barloworld
- 2010: Garmin–Transitions
- 2011: Team RadioShack
- 2012–2013: Garmin–Barracuda

Managerial team
- 2014–2015: Garmin–Sharp

Major wins
- Grand Tours Tour de France 1 individual stage (2007) Giro d'Italia 1 TTT stage (2012) Vuelta a España 2 individual stages (1999, 2001) One-Day races and Classics African Time Trial Championships (2006) National Time Trial Championships (2000) National Road Race Championships (2012)
Medal record
Men's road cycling
Representing South Africa
African Road Championships
Gold medal – first place	2006 Port Louis	Time trial
Bronze medal – third place	2006 Port Louis	Road race

Robert "Robbie" Owen Hunter (born 22 April 1977) is a retired South African professional road racing cyclist who competed professionally between 1999 and 2013. Hunter competed with UCI ProTeam Garmin–Sharp during his final professional season.

== Career ==
Hunter became the first South African to compete in the Tour de France, when he did so in 2001. In 2006, Hunter rode for Phonak in the UCI ProTour, but after their disbandment he signed for UCI Continental Circuits team Barloworld for 2007. His achievements include winning stages at the 1999 and 2001 Vuelta a Españas, the 2007 Tour de France, and the overall title at the 2004 Tour of Qatar, as well as the points classification at the 2004 Tour de Suisse.

In 2007, Hunter returned to the Tour de France as team captain of Barloworld. Hunter won sprint stage 11, the first stage won by an African.

Following the 2013 season, Hunter retired from professional cycling. Hunter was a directeur sportif for Garmin–Sharp in 2014 and 2015. In November 2015 he announced that he was leaving the team in order to spend more time with his family and concentrate on his role as a rider agent for a number of African cyclists, including Louis Meintjes.

Hunter worked as the video assistant commissaire at the 2018 Tour de France.

== Personal life ==
Hunter resides in Arth, Schwyz, Switzerland.

== Career achievements ==
=== Major results ===
1999
Vuelta a España

1st Sprints classification
1st Stage 1

2000
1st Time trial, National Road Championships
2nd Overall Ronde van Nederland

1st Points classification
1st Young rider classification
1st Stages 2 & 3

2nd EnBW Grand Prix (with Oscar Camenzind)
3rd Overall Four Days of Dunkirk
3rd Memorial Rik Van Steenbergen
2001
1st Tour de Rijke
1st Stage 17 Vuelta a España
9th Overall Ronde van Nederland

1st Young rider classification

2002
1st Stage 1 Tour de Pologne
2nd Overall Tour de Langkawi

1st Points classification
1st Stages 1 (ITT), 2 & 5

2nd Grote Prijs Jef Scherens
5th Overall Three Days of De Panne
6th Gent–Wevelgem
7th Road race, Commonwealth Games
2003
4th Tour de Picardie
10th Trofeo Cala Millor
2004
1st Overall Tour of Qatar

1st Stages 3 & 5

Tour de Suisse

1st Stages 3 & 5

Uniqa Classic

1st Points classification
1st Stages 1 & 3

1st Stage 4b Sachsen-Tour
5th International Grand Prix Doha
2005
1st International Grand Prix Doha
1st Stage 1 (TTT) Volta a Catalunya
1st Stage 1 Tour de Georgia
1st Stage 4 Setmana Catalana
1st Stage 5 Tour Méditerranéen
8th Trofeo Luis Puig
2006
African Road Championships

1st Time trial
3rd Road race

4th Overall Tour of Qatar
2007
1st Overall Volta ao Distrito de Santarém

1st Stage 2

1st Overall Tour de Picardie

1st Stage 1

1st Stage 11 Tour de France
1st Stage 2 Clasica Alcobendas
1st Stage 5 Giro del Capo
3rd Coppa Bernocchi
4th Gran Premio della Costa Etruschi
10th Milan–San Remo
10th Grand Prix Pino Cerami
2008
1st Stage 4 GP CTT Correios de Portugal
1st Cape Argus Cycle Tour
4th Memorial Viviana Manservisi
8th Overall Giro della Provincia di Grosseto
2009
1st Stage 3 Giro del Trentino
1st Stage 4 Tour Méditerranéen
3rd Gran Premio della Costa Etruschi
9th Overall Delta Tour Zeeland
2010
Vuelta a Murcia

1st Stages 1 & 2

9th Overall Tour Down Under
2011
1st Mumbai Cyclothon II
1st Stage 1 Tour of Austria
4th Mumbai Cyclothon I
7th Grand Prix de Denain
2012
National Road Championships

1st Road race
4th Time trial

1st Stage 4 (TTT) Giro d'Italia
1st Stage 2 (TTT) Tour of Qatar
2013
1st Overall Mzansi Tour

1st Points classification
1st Stage 2

8th Trofeo Platja de Muro

=== Grand Tour general classification results timeline ===
Grand Tour	1999	2000	2001	2002	2003	2004	2005	2006	2007	2008	2009	2010	2011	2012	2013
Giro d'Italia	—	—	—	—	—	—	—	—	—	—	154	—	DNF	DNF	141
Tour de France	—	—	DNF	97	DNF	—	DNF	DNF	118	106	—	DNF	—	DNF	—
Vuelta a España	72	—	—	118	—	DNF	—	—	—	—	—	—	—	—	—

Legend
—	Did not compete
DNF	Did not finish
