= Chann McRae =

American cyclist (born 1971)

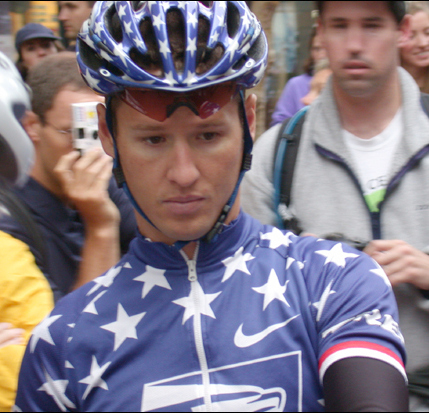
- McRae in 2002

Personal information
- Full name: William Chann McRae
- Born: October 11, 1971 (age 55) Albany, Georgia, United States of America

Cycling career
- Sport: Cycling
- Current team: Retired
- Discipline: Road
- Role: Rider
- Rider type: All-rounder

Professional teams
- 1996: Porcelana Santa Clara – Samara
- 1997: Die Continentale – Olympia
- 1998: Saturn
- 1999–2000: Mapei – QuickStep
- 2001: Mercury – Viatel
- 2001–2002: US Postal Service

Major wins
- National Road Championships (2002)

William Chann McRae (born October 11, 1971) is an American professional road bicycle racer from Albany, Georgia. He was a professional from 1996 to 2003. He raced in the Tour de France and grew up with Lance Armstrong.

== Major results ==
1990
3rd in General Classification Ruban Granitiers Bretons (FRA)
1992
1st in United States National Road Race Championships, Amateurs
1994
3rd in United States National Road Race Championships, Amateurs (USA)
1997
1st in Lancaster Classic (USA)
1st in First Union Invitational (USA)
3rd in Stage 5 Regio Tour International (GER)
3rd in Stage 6 Závod Míru, Żywiec (CZE)
2nd in Köln – Schuld – Frechen (GER)
1998
2nd in Stage 4 Závod Míru, Jested (CZE)
1st in Stage 1 Niedersachsen Rundfahrt, Wolfsburg (GER)
2nd in General Classification Niedersachsen Rundfahrt (GER)
1999
5th. World Championships road race
3rd in Firenze – Pistoia (ITA)
2000
1st in Erembodegem-Terjoden (BEL)
3rd in GP Beghelli (ITA)
8th. World Championships road race
17th in General Classification Giro d'Italia (ITA)

2001
2nd in Austin (USA)

2002
2nd in USPro Ch'ship (USA)
1st in United States National Championship, Road, Elite, Philadelphia (USA)
1st in Stage 1 Volta Ciclista a Catalunya, TTT, Deltebre (ESP)

alongside Tom Boonen, George Hincapie, Roberto Heras, Christian Vande Velde, Michael Barry, David Clinger, and Matthew White

2003
3rd in Stage 2 Pomona Valley Stage Race, KB Home (USA)
