= Toni Tauler =

Spanish cyclist

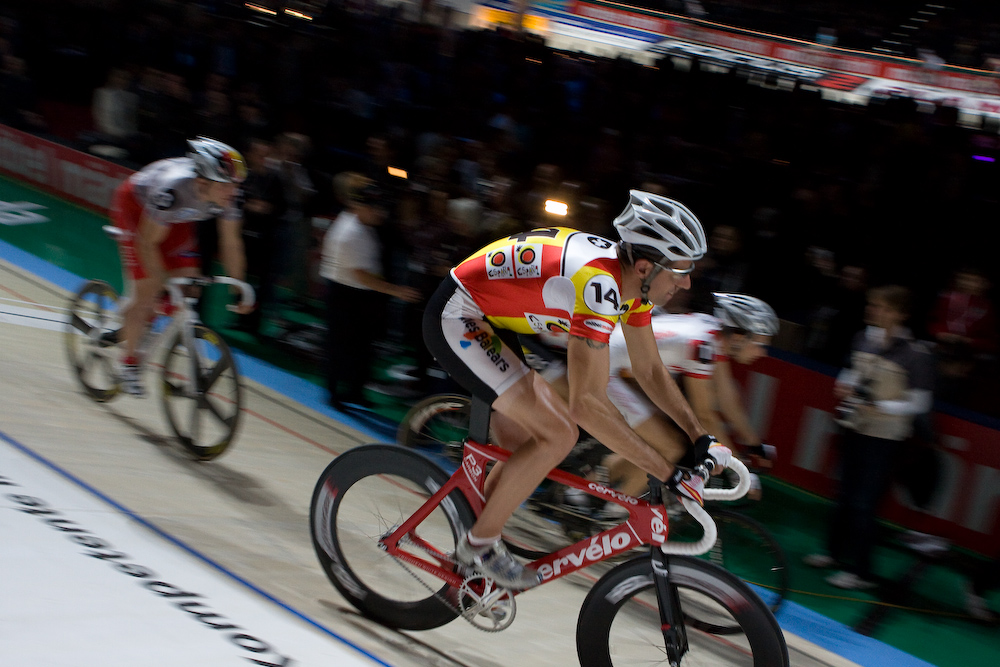

Personal information
- Full name: Antonio Tauler Llull
- Born: 11 April 1974 (age 52) Santa Margalida, Spain

Cycling career
- Sport: Cycling
- Disciplines: Road, track
- Role: Rider

Professional teams
- 1998: Ros Mary - Amica Chips
- 1999–2003: Kelme-Costa Blanca
- 2004–2005: Illes Balears-Caisse d'Epargne
- 2006: 3 Molinos Resort
Medal record
Men's track cycling
Olympic Games
Silver medal – second place	2008 Beijing	Madison

Antonio Tauler Llull (born 11 April 1974) is a Spanish professional racing cyclist from Santa Margalida.

== Major results ==
1996
1st, Vuelta a Cartagena
1998
2nd, Stage 5, Vuelta a Murcia
1998 World Cup

3rd, Pursuit, Berlin

1999
1st, Stage 5, Vuelta a Murcia
2000
3rd, Stage 1, Volta a la Comunitat Valenciana
2001
2nd, Individual time trial, National Road Championships
2002
2nd, Individual time trial, National Road Championships
3rd, Memorial Manuel Galera
2003
2nd, Individual time trial, National Road Championships
2006
2nd, Pursuit, National Track Championships
1st, Individual time trial, National Road Championships
2007
National Track Championships

2nd, Pursuit
3rd, Team Pursuit
3rd, Madison

2007–2008 World Cup

2nd, Points race, Sydney

Sporting positions
Preceded by Iván Gutiérrez	Spanish National Time Trial Champion; 2006	Succeeded by Iván Gutiérrez
