= 1997 Vuelta a España, Stage 1 to Stage 11 =

Cycling race stages

The 1997 Vuelta a España was the 52nd edition of the Grand Vuelta a España, one of cycling's Grand Tours. The Vuelta began in Lisbon on 6 September, and Stage 11 occurred on 16 September with a stage to Plasencia. The race finished in Madrid on 27 September.

== Stage 1 ==
6 September 1997 — Lisbon to Estoril, 155.7 km (96.7 mi)

Stage 1 result

Rank	Rider	Team	Time
1	Lars Michaelsen (DEN)	TVM–Farm Frites	4h 01' 32"
2	Claudio Chiappucci (ITA)	Asics–CGA	s.t.
3	Laurent Jalabert (FRA)	ONCE	s.t.
4	Fabrizio Guidi (ITA)	Scrigno–Gaerne	s.t.
5	Mauro Bettin (ITA)	Refin–Mobilvetta	s.t.
6	Roberto Petito (ITA)	Saeco–Estro	s.t.
7	Maurizio Fondriest (ITA)	Cofidis	s.t.
8	Eddy Mazzoleni (ITA)	Saeco–Estro	s.t.
9	Massimiliano Gentili (ITA)	Cantina Tollo–Carrier–Starplast	s.t.
10	Abraham Olano (ESP)	Banesto	s.t.

General classification after Stage 1

Rank	Rider	Team	Time
1	Lars Michaelsen (DEN)	TVM–Farm Frites	4h 01' 20"
2	Claudio Chiappucci (ITA)	Asics–CGA	+ 4"
3	Angelo Canzonieri (ITA)	Saeco–Estro	+ 6"
4	Laurent Jalabert (FRA)	ONCE	+ 8"
5	Francisco Cerezo (ESP)	Estepona en Marcha–Cafés Toscaf	s.t.
6	Eleuterio Anguita (ESP)	Estepona en Marcha–Cafés Toscaf	+ 11"
7	Andrea Vatteroni (ITA)	Scrigno–Gaerne	s.t.
8	Fabrizio Guidi (ITA)	Scrigno–Gaerne	+ 12"
9	Mauro Bettin (ITA)	Refin–Mobilvetta	s.t.
10	Roberto Petito (ITA)	Saeco–Estro	s.t.

== Stage 2 ==
7 September 1997 — Évora to Vilamoura, 225.3 km (140.0 mi)

Stage 2 result

Rank	Rider	Team	Time
1	Marcel Wüst (GER)	Festina–Lotus	5h 42' 13"
2	Ján Svorada (CZE)	Mapei–GB	s.t.
3	Fabrizio Guidi (ITA)	Scrigno–Gaerne	s.t.
4	Endrio Leoni (ITA)	Aki–Safi	s.t.
5	Alessio Di Basco (ITA)	Saeco–Estro	s.t.
6	Alessandro Petacchi (ITA)	Scrigno–Gaerne	s.t.
7	Giancarlo Raimondi (ITA)	Brescialat–Oyster	s.t.
8	Federico Colonna (ITA)	Asics–CGA	s.t.
9	Aart Vierhouten (NED)	Rabobank	s.t.
10	Jans Koerts (NED)	Rabobank	s.t.

General classification after Stage 2

Rank	Rider	Team	Time
1	Lars Michaelsen (DEN)	TVM–Farm Frites	9h 43' 31"
2	Claudio Chiappucci (ITA)	Asics–CGA	+ 6"
3	Laurent Jalabert (FRA)	ONCE	+ 7"
4	Angelo Canzonieri (ITA)	Saeco–Estro	s.t.
5	Fabrizio Guidi (ITA)	Scrigno–Gaerne	+ 10"
6	Francisco Cerezo (ESP)	Estepona en Marcha–Cafés Toscaf	s.t.
7	Eleuterio Anguita (ESP)	Estepona en Marcha–Cafés Toscaf	+ 13"
8	Andrea Vatteroni (ITA)	Scrigno–Gaerne	s.t.
9	Roberto Petito (ITA)	Saeco–Estro	+ 14"
10	Abraham Olano (ESP)	Banesto	s.t.

== Stage 3 ==
8 September 1997 — Loulé to Huelva, 173.3 km (107.7 mi)

Stage 3 result

Rank	Rider	Team	Time
1	Marcel Wüst (GER)	Festina–Lotus	4h 28' 07"
2	Fabrizio Guidi (ITA)	Scrigno–Gaerne	s.t.
3	Sven Teutenberg (GER)	U.S. Postal Service	s.t.
4	Marco Zanotti (ITA)	Aki–Safi	s.t.
5	Léon van Bon (NED)	Rabobank	s.t.
6	Stéphane Barthe (FRA)	Casino	s.t.
7	Lars Michaelsen (DEN)	TVM–Farm Frites	s.t.
8	Orlando Rodrigues (POR)	Banesto	s.t.
9	Endrio Leoni (ITA)	Aki–Safi	s.t.
10	Laurent Jalabert (FRA)	ONCE	s.t.

General classification after Stage 3

Rank	Rider	Team	Time
1	Lars Michaelsen (DEN)	TVM–Farm Frites	14h 11' 36"
2	Fabrizio Guidi (ITA)	Scrigno–Gaerne	+ 1"
3	Claudio Chiappucci (ITA)	Asics–CGA	+ 7"
4	Laurent Jalabert (FRA)	ONCE	+ 9"
5	Angelo Canzonieri (ITA)	Saeco–Estro	s.t.
6	Mauro Bettin (ITA)	Refin–Mobilvetta	+ 11"
7	Francisco Cerezo (ESP)	Estepona en Marcha–Cafés Toscaf	+ 12"
8	Eleuterio Anguita (ESP)	Estepona en Marcha–Cafés Toscaf	+ 15"
9	Andrea Vatteroni (ITA)	Scrigno–Gaerne	s.t.
10	Abraham Olano (ESP)	Banesto	+ 16"

== Stage 4 ==
9 September 1997 — Huelva to Jerez de la Frontera, 192.5 km (119.6 mi)

Stage 4 result

Rank	Rider	Team	Time
1	Eleuterio Anguita (ESP)	Estepona en Marcha–Cafés Toscaf	4h 17' 38"
2	Claudio Camin (ITA)	Brescialat–Oyster	s.t.
3	Ján Svorada (CZE)	Mapei–GB	s.t.
4	Marco Zanotti (ITA)	Aki–Safi	s.t.
5	Mirko Rossato (ITA)	Scrigno–Gaerne	s.t.
6	Aart Vierhouten (NED)	Rabobank	s.t.
7	Gianluca Gorini (ITA)	Aki–Safi	s.t.
8	Laurent Jalabert (FRA)	ONCE	s.t.
9	Orlando Rodrigues (POR)	Banesto	s.t.
10	Federico Colonna (ITA)	Asics–CGA	s.t.

General classification after Stage 4

Rank	Rider	Team	Time
1	Fabrizio Guidi (ITA)	Scrigno–Gaerne	18h 29' 12"
2	Lars Michaelsen (DEN)	TVM–Farm Frites	s.t
3	Eleuterio Anguita (ESP)	Estepona en Marcha–Cafés Toscaf	+ 5"
4	Claudio Chiappucci (ITA)	Asics–CGA	+ 8"
5	Laurent Jalabert (FRA)	ONCE	+ 11"
6	Angelo Canzonieri (ITA)	Saeco–Estro	s.t.
7	Mauro Bettin (ITA)	Refin–Mobilvetta	+ 13"
8	Francisco Cerezo (ESP)	Estepona en Marcha–Cafés Toscaf	+ 14"
9	Claus Michael Møller (DEN)	Estepona en Marcha–Cafés Toscaf	s.t.
10	Santiago Botero (COL)	Kelme–Costa Blanca	s.t.

== Stage 5 ==
10 September 1997 — Jerez de la Frontera to Málaga, 230.8 km (143.4 mi)

Stage 5 result

Rank	Rider	Team	Time
1	Marcel Wüst (GER)	Festina–Lotus	5h 43' 27"
2	Giancarlo Raimondi (ITA)	Brescialat–Oyster	s.t.
3	Ángel Edo (ESP)	Kelme–Costa Blanca	s.t.
4	Alessio Di Basco (ITA)	Saeco–Estro	s.t.
5	Laurent Jalabert (FRA)	ONCE	s.t.
6	Jürgen Werner (GER)	Refin–Mobilvetta	s.t.
7	Sven Teutenberg (GER)	U.S. Postal Service	s.t.
8	Samuele Schiavina (ITA)	Asics–CGA	s.t.
9	Max van Heeswijk (NED)	Rabobank	s.t.
10	Lars Michaelsen (DEN)	TVM–Farm Frites	s.t.

General classification after Stage 5

Rank	Rider	Team	Time
1	Lars Michaelsen (DEN)	TVM–Farm Frites	24h 12' 36"
2	Fabrizio Guidi (ITA)	Scrigno–Gaerne	+ 2"
3	Eleuterio Anguita (ESP)	Estepona en Marcha–Cafés Toscaf	+ 8"
4	Laurent Jalabert (FRA)	ONCE	+ 11"
5	Claudio Chiappucci (ITA)	Asics–CGA	s.t.
6	Angelo Canzonieri (ITA)	Saeco–Estro	+ 14"
7	Mauro Bettin (ITA)	Refin–Mobilvetta	+ 16"
8	Francisco Cerezo (ESP)	Estepona en Marcha–Cafés Toscaf	+ 17"
9	Claus Michael Møller (DEN)	Estepona en Marcha–Cafés Toscaf	s.t.
10	Santiago Botero (COL)	Kelme–Costa Blanca	s.t.

== Stage 6 ==
11 September 1997 — Málaga to Granada, 147 km (91 mi)

Stage 6 result

Rank	Rider	Team	Time
1	Laurent Jalabert (FRA)	ONCE	3h 36' 03"
2	Laurent Dufaux (SUI)	Festina–Lotus	s.t.
3	Fernando Escartín (ESP)	Kelme–Costa Blanca	s.t.
4	Alex Zülle (SUI)	ONCE	s.t.
5	Sergei Ivanov (RUS)	TVM–Farm Frites	+ 1' 57"
6	Bo Hamburger (DEN)	TVM–Farm Frites	s.t.
7	David García Dapena (ESP)	Equipo Euskadi	s.t.
8	Claudio Chiappucci (ITA)	Asics–CGA	s.t.
9	Claus Michael Møller (DEN)	Estepona en Marcha–Cafés Toscaf	s.t.
10	Tony Rominger (SUI)	Cofidis	s.t.

General classification after Stage 6

Rank	Rider	Team	Time
1	Laurent Jalabert (FRA)	ONCE	27h 48' 34"
2	Laurent Dufaux (SUI)	Festina–Lotus	+ 16"
3	Fernando Escartín (ESP)	Kelme–Costa Blanca	+ 21"
4	Alex Zülle (SUI)	ONCE	+ 26"
5	Claudio Chiappucci (ITA)	Asics–CGA	+ 2' 13"
6	Francisco Cerezo (ESP)	Estepona en Marcha–Cafés Toscaf	+ 2' 19"
7	Claus Michael Møller (DEN)	Estepona en Marcha–Cafés Toscaf	s.t.
8	Yvon Ledanois (FRA)	GAN	+ 2' 23"
9	Abraham Olano (ESP)	Banesto	s.t.
10	Ibon Ajuria (ESP)	Equipo Euskadi	s.t.

== Stage 7 ==
12 September 1997 — Guadix to Sierra Nevada, 219.2 km (136.2 mi)

Stage 7 result

Rank	Rider	Team	Time
1	Yvon Ledanois (FRA)	GAN	6h 15' 06"
2	Laurent Dufaux (SUI)	Festina–Lotus	+ 42"
3	Alex Zülle (SUI)	ONCE	s.t.
4	José María Jiménez (ESP)	Banesto	s.t.
5	Fernando Escartín (ESP)	Kelme–Costa Blanca	s.t.
6	Claus Michael Møller (DEN)	Estepona en Marcha–Cafés Toscaf	+ 47"
7	Peter Luttenberger (AUT)	Rabobank	+ 51"
8	Enrico Zaina (ITA)	Asics–CGA	s.t.
9	Armand de Las Cuevas (FRA)	Banesto	+ 1' 00"
10	Philippe Bordenave (FRA)	Casino	+ 1' 03"

General classification after Stage 7

Rank	Rider	Team	Time
1	Laurent Dufaux (SUI)	Festina–Lotus	34h 04' 30"
2	Fernando Escartín (ESP)	Kelme–Costa Blanca	+ 13"
3	Alex Zülle (SUI)	ONCE	+ 14"
4	Yvon Ledanois (FRA)	GAN	+ 1' 21"
5	Claus Michael Møller (DEN)	Estepona en Marcha–Cafés Toscaf	+ 2' 16"
6	Enrico Zaina (ITA)	Asics–CGA	+ 2' 24"
7	Peter Luttenberger (AUT)	Rabobank	s.t.
8	Armand de Las Cuevas (FRA)	Banesto	+ 2' 33"
9	Marcos-Antonio Serrano (ESP)	Kelme–Costa Blanca	+ 2' 36"
10	Daniel Clavero (ESP)	Estepona en Marcha–Cafés Toscaf	s.t.

== Stage 8 ==
13 September 1997 — Granada to Córdoba, 175.8 km (109.2 mi)

Stage 8 result

Rank	Rider	Team	Time
1	Bart Voskamp (NED)	TVM–Farm Frites	3h 55' 00"
2	Mariano Piccoli (ITA)	Brescialat–Oyster	+ 2"
3	Léon van Bon (NED)	Rabobank	+ 7"
4	Mauro Radaelli (ITA)	Aki–Safi	s.t.
5	Angelo Canzonieri (ITA)	Saeco–Estro	s.t.
6	Fabrizio Guidi (ITA)	Scrigno–Gaerne	s.t.
7	Davide Bramati (ITA)	Mapei–GB	s.t.
8	Neil Stephens (AUS)	Festina–Lotus	s.t.
9	Óscar López Uriarte (ESP)	Equipo Euskadi	+ 13"
10	Marco Lietti (ITA)	Refin–Mobilvetta	+ 20"

General classification after Stage 8

Rank	Rider	Team	Time
1	Laurent Dufaux (SUI)	Festina–Lotus	38h 00' 07"
2	Fernando Escartín (ESP)	Kelme–Costa Blanca	+ 13"
3	Alex Zülle (SUI)	ONCE	+ 14"
4	Yvon Ledanois (FRA)	GAN	+ 1' 21"
5	Claus Michael Møller (DEN)	Estepona en Marcha–Cafés Toscaf	+ 2' 16"
6	Enrico Zaina (ITA)	Asics–CGA	+ 2' 24"
7	Peter Luttenberger (AUT)	Rabobank	s.t.
8	Armand de Las Cuevas (FRA)	Banesto	+ 2' 33"
9	Marcos-Antonio Serrano (ESP)	Kelme–Costa Blanca	+ 2' 36"
10	Daniel Clavero (ESP)	Estepona en Marcha–Cafés Toscaf	s.t.

== Stage 9 ==
14 September 1997 — Córdoba to Córdoba, 35 km (22 mi) (ITT)

Stage 9 result

Rank	Rider	Team	Time
1	Melcior Mauri (ESP)	ONCE	41' 11"
2	Serhiy Honchar (UKR)	Aki–Safi	+ 21"
3	Laurent Jalabert (FRA)	ONCE	+ 22"
4	Alex Zülle (SUI)	ONCE	+ 38"
5	Mikel Zarrabeitia (ESP)	ONCE	+ 49"
6	Juan Carlos Domínguez (ESP)	Kelme–Costa Blanca	+ 58"
7	Gianni Faresin (ITA)	Mapei–GB	+ 1' 14"
8	Claus Michael Møller (DEN)	Estepona en Marcha–Cafés Toscaf	+ 1' 16"
9	Tony Rominger (SUI)	Cofidis	s.t.
10	Francisque Teyssier (FRA)	GAN	+ 1' 17"

General classification after Stage 9

Rank	Rider	Team	Time
1	Alex Zülle (SUI)	ONCE	38h 42' 10"
2	Laurent Dufaux (SUI)	Festina–Lotus	+ 32"
3	Fernando Escartín (ESP)	Kelme–Costa Blanca	+ 2' 14"
4	Claus Michael Møller (DEN)	Estepona en Marcha–Cafés Toscaf	+ 2' 40"
5	Yvon Ledanois (FRA)	GAN	+ 3' 15"
6	Daniel Clavero (ESP)	Estepona en Marcha–Cafés Toscaf	+ 3' 50"
7	Marcos-Antonio Serrano (ESP)	Kelme–Costa Blanca	s.t.
8	Enrico Zaina (ITA)	Asics–CGA	+ 3' 56"
9	Armand de Las Cuevas (FRA)	Banesto	+ 4' 27"
10	Igor González de Galdeano (ESP)	Equipo Euskadi	+ 5' 33"

== Stage 10 ==
15 September 1997 — Córdoba to Almendralejo, 224.5 km (139.5 mi)

Stage 10 result

Rank	Rider	Team	Time
1	Mariano Piccoli (ITA)	Brescialat–Oyster	4h 56' 22"
2	Juan Carlos Vicario (ESP)	Estepona en Marcha–Cafés Toscaf	s.t.
3	Ján Svorada (CZE)	Mapei–GB	+ 25"
4	Biagio Conte (ITA)	Scrigno–Gaerne	s.t.
5	Claudio Camin (ITA)	Brescialat–Oyster	s.t.
6	Mauro Bettin (ITA)	Refin–Mobilvetta	s.t.
7	Frédéric Pontier (FRA)	Casino	s.t.
8	Claudio Chiappucci (ITA)	Asics–CGA	s.t.
9	Alessio Di Basco (ITA)	Saeco–Estro	s.t.
10	Samuele Schiavina (ITA)	Asics–CGA	s.t.

General classification after Stage 10

Rank	Rider	Team	Time
1	Alex Zülle (SUI)	ONCE	43h 38' 57"
2	Laurent Dufaux (SUI)	Festina–Lotus	+ 32"
3	Fernando Escartín (ESP)	Kelme–Costa Blanca	+ 2' 14"
4	Claus Michael Møller (DEN)	Estepona en Marcha–Cafés Toscaf	+ 2' 40"
5	Yvon Ledanois (FRA)	GAN	+ 3' 15"
6	Daniel Clavero (ESP)	Estepona en Marcha–Cafés Toscaf	+ 3' 50"
7	Marcos-Antonio Serrano (ESP)	Kelme–Costa Blanca	s.t.
8	Enrico Zaina (ITA)	Asics–CGA	+ 3' 56"
9	Armand de Las Cuevas (FRA)	Banesto	+ 4' 27"
10	Igor González de Galdeano (ESP)	Equipo Euskadi	+ 5' 33"

== Stage 11 ==
16 September 1997 — Almendralejo to Plasencia, 194.5 km (120.9 mi)

Stage 11 result

Rank	Rider	Team	Time
1	Ján Svorada (CZE)	Mapei–GB	4h 21' 33"
2	Maurizio Fondriest (ITA)	Cofidis	s.t.
3	Laurent Jalabert (FRA)	ONCE	s.t.
4	Sergei Ivanov (RUS)	TVM–Farm Frites	s.t.
5	Massimiliano Gentili (ITA)	Cantina Tollo–Carrier–Starplast	s.t.
6	Claudio Camin (ITA)	Brescialat–Oyster	s.t.
7	Angelo Canzonieri (ITA)	Saeco–Estro	s.t.
8	Laurent Brochard (FRA)	Festina–Lotus	s.t.
9	Laurent Dufaux (SUI)	Festina–Lotus	s.t.
10	Fabrizio Guidi (ITA)	Scrigno–Gaerne	s.t.

General classification after Stage 11

Rank	Rider	Team	Time
1	Alex Zülle (SUI)	ONCE	48h 00' 30"
2	Laurent Dufaux (SUI)	Festina–Lotus	+ 32"
3	Fernando Escartín (ESP)	Kelme–Costa Blanca	+ 2' 14"
4	Claus Michael Møller (DEN)	Estepona en Marcha–Cafés Toscaf	+ 2' 40"
5	Yvon Ledanois (FRA)	GAN	+ 3' 15"
6	Daniel Clavero (ESP)	Estepona en Marcha–Cafés Toscaf	+ 3' 50"
7	Marcos-Antonio Serrano (ESP)	Kelme–Costa Blanca	s.t.
8	Enrico Zaina (ITA)	Asics–CGA	+ 3' 56"
9	Igor González de Galdeano (ESP)	Equipo Euskadi	+ 5' 33"
10	Bo Hamburger (DEN)	TVM–Farm Frites	+ 5' 57"
