= 1997 Vuelta a España, Stage 12 to Stage 22 =

Cycling race stages

The 1997 Vuelta a España was the 52nd edition of the Vuelta a España, one of cycling's Grand Tours. The Vuelta began in Lisbon on 6 September, and Stage 12 occurred on 17 September with a stage from León. The race finished in Madrid on 27 September.

== Stage 12 ==
17 September 1997 — León to Alto del Morredero, 147 km (91 mi)

Stage 12 result

Rank	Rider	Team	Time
1	Roberto Heras (ESP)	Kelme–Costa Blanca	3h 23' 25"
2	José María Jiménez (ESP)	Banesto	+ 29"
3	Pascal Richard (SUI)	Casino	+ 35"
4	Pavel Tonkov (RUS)	Mapei–GB	+ 40"
5	Alex Zülle (SUI)	ONCE	+ 1' 36"
6	Fernando Escartín (ESP)	Kelme–Costa Blanca	+ 1' 39"
7	Enrico Zaina (ITA)	Asics–CGA	+ 1' 42"
8	Laurent Dufaux (SUI)	Festina–Lotus	s.t.
9	Marcos-Antonio Serrano (ESP)	Kelme–Costa Blanca	+ 1' 48"
10	Daniel Clavero (ESP)	Estepona en Marcha–Cafés Toscaf	s.t.

General classification after Stage 12

Rank	Rider	Team	Time
1	Alex Zülle (SUI)	ONCE	51h 25' 31"
2	Laurent Dufaux (SUI)	Festina–Lotus	+ 36"
3	Fernando Escartín (ESP)	Kelme–Costa Blanca	+ 2' 17"
4	Yvon Ledanois (FRA)	GAN	+ 3' 27"
5	Marcos-Antonio Serrano (ESP)	Kelme–Costa Blanca	+ 4' 02"
6	Enrico Zaina (ITA)	Asics–CGA	s.t.
7	Daniel Clavero (ESP)	Estepona en Marcha–Cafés Toscaf	+ 4' 22"
8	Roberto Heras (ESP)	Kelme–Costa Blanca	+ 4' 53"
9	Claus Michael Møller (DEN)	Estepona en Marcha–Cafés Toscaf	+ 5' 21"
10	Pascal Richard (SUI)	Casino	+ 6' 02"

== Stage 13 ==
18 September 1997 — Ponferrada to Estación Valgrande-Pajares, 196 km (122 mi)

Stage 13 result

Rank	Rider	Team	Time
1	Pavel Tonkov (RUS)	Mapei–GB	5h 10' 02"
2	José María Jiménez (ESP)	Banesto	+ 32"
3	Laurent Dufaux (SUI)	Festina–Lotus	+ 53"
4	Yvon Ledanois (FRA)	GAN	s.t.
5	Fernando Escartín (ESP)	Kelme–Costa Blanca	s.t.
6	Alex Zülle (SUI)	ONCE	s.t.
7	José Manuel Uría (ESP)	Estepona en Marcha–Cafés Toscaf	s.t.
8	Enrico Zaina (ITA)	Asics–CGA	s.t.
9	Carlos Contreras Caño (COL)	Flavia-Telecom	s.t.
10	Roberto Heras (ESP)	Kelme–Costa Blanca	+ 1' 02"

General classification after Stage 13

Rank	Rider	Team	Time
1	Alex Zülle (SUI)	ONCE	56h 36' 26"
2	Laurent Dufaux (SUI)	Festina–Lotus	+ 32"
3	Fernando Escartín (ESP)	Kelme–Costa Blanca	+ 2' 17"
4	Yvon Ledanois (FRA)	GAN	+ 3' 27"
5	Enrico Zaina (ITA)	Asics–CGA	+ 4' 02"
6	Marcos-Antonio Serrano (ESP)	Kelme–Costa Blanca	+ 4' 52"
7	Roberto Heras (ESP)	Kelme–Costa Blanca	+ 5' 02"
8	Daniel Clavero (ESP)	Estepona en Marcha–Cafés Toscaf	+ 6' 26"
9	Gianni Faresin (ITA)	Mapei–GB	+ 8' 03"
10	Philippe Bordenave (FRA)	Casino	+ 9' 07"

== Stage 14 ==
19 September 1997 — Oviedo to Alto del Naranco, 169.5 km (105.3 mi)

Stage 14 result

Rank	Rider	Team	Time
1	José Vicente García (ESP)	Banesto	4h 07' 10"
2	Mariano Piccoli (ITA)	Brescialat–Oyster	+ 1' 18"
3	Bruno Thibout (FRA)	Cofidis	+ 1' 33"
4	Martin Hvastija (SLO)	Cantina Tollo–Carrier–Starplast	+ 1' 51"
5	Danny Nelissen (NED)	Rabobank	+ 2' 34"
6	Alex Zülle (SUI)	ONCE	+ 10' 14"
7	Daniel Clavero (ESP)	Estepona en Marcha–Cafés Toscaf	+ 10' 23"
8	Enrico Zaina (ITA)	Asics–CGA	+ 10' 25"
9	Fernando Escartín (ESP)	Kelme–Costa Blanca	s.t.
10	Fabian Jeker (SUI)	Festina–Lotus	+ 10' 35"

General classification after Stage 14

Rank	Rider	Team	Time
1	Alex Zülle (SUI)	ONCE	60h 53' 50"
2	Laurent Dufaux (SUI)	Festina–Lotus	+ 1' 13"
3	Fernando Escartín (ESP)	Kelme–Costa Blanca	+ 2' 28"
4	Yvon Ledanois (FRA)	GAN	+ 3' 57"
5	Enrico Zaina (ITA)	Asics–CGA	+ 4' 13"
6	Marcos-Antonio Serrano (ESP)	Kelme–Costa Blanca	+ 5' 13"
7	Roberto Heras (ESP)	Kelme–Costa Blanca	+ 5' 23"
8	Daniel Clavero (ESP)	Estepona en Marcha–Cafés Toscaf	+ 6' 35"
9	Gianni Faresin (ITA)	Mapei–GB	+ 8' 44"
10	Laurent Jalabert (FRA)	ONCE	+ 9' 33"

== Stage 15 ==
20 September 1997 — Oviedo to Lagos de Covadonga, 159.8 km (99.3 mi)

Stage 15 result

Rank	Rider	Team	Time
1	Pavel Tonkov (RUS)	Mapei–GB	4h 03' 55"
2	Alex Zülle (SUI)	ONCE	+ 18"
3	José María Jiménez (ESP)	Banesto	+ 24"
4	Fernando Escartín (ESP)	Kelme–Costa Blanca	+ 28"
5	Laurent Jalabert (FRA)	ONCE	+ 35"
6	Daniel Clavero (ESP)	Estepona en Marcha–Cafés Toscaf	+ 1' 04"
7	Roberto Heras (ESP)	Kelme–Costa Blanca	s.t.
8	Enrico Zaina (ITA)	Asics–CGA	s.t.
9	Leonardo Piepoli (ITA)	Refin–Mobilvetta	+ 1' 53"
10	Philippe Bordenave (FRA)	Casino	s.t.

General classification after Stage 15

Rank	Rider	Team	Time
1	Alex Zülle (SUI)	ONCE	64h 57' 55"
2	Fernando Escartín (ESP)	Kelme–Costa Blanca	+ 2' 46"
3	Laurent Dufaux (SUI)	Festina–Lotus	+ 3' 39"
4	Enrico Zaina (ITA)	Asics–CGA	+ 5' 07"
5	Roberto Heras (ESP)	Kelme–Costa Blanca	+ 6' 17"
6	Marcos-Antonio Serrano (ESP)	Kelme–Costa Blanca	+ 7' 10"
7	Daniel Clavero (ESP)	Estepona en Marcha–Cafés Toscaf	+ 7' 29"
8	Laurent Jalabert (FRA)	ONCE	+ 9' 56"
9	Gianni Faresin (ITA)	Mapei–GB	+ 11' 10"
10	Yvon Ledanois (FRA)	GAN	+ 11' 22"

== Stage 16 ==
21 September 1997 — Cangas de Onís to Santander, 170 km (110 mi)

Stage 16 result

Rank	Rider	Team	Time
1	Ján Svorada (CZE)	Mapei–GB	3h 54' 07"
2	Marcel Wüst (GER)	Festina–Lotus	s.t.
3	Alessio Di Basco (ITA)	Saeco–Estro	s.t.
4	Lars Michaelsen (DEN)	TVM–Farm Frites	s.t.
5	Aart Vierhouten (NED)	Rabobank	s.t.
6	Stefano Colagè (ITA)	Refin–Mobilvetta	s.t.
7	Sven Teutenberg (GER)	U.S. Postal Service	s.t.
8	Claudio Camin (ITA)	Brescialat–Oyster	s.t.
9	Gianluca Gorini (ITA)	Aki–Safi	s.t.
10	Ángel Edo (ESP)	Kelme–Costa Blanca	s.t.

General classification after Stage 16

Rank	Rider	Team	Time
1	Alex Zülle (SUI)	ONCE	68h 52' 02"
2	Fernando Escartín (ESP)	Kelme–Costa Blanca	+ 2' 46"
3	Laurent Dufaux (SUI)	Festina–Lotus	+ 3' 39"
4	Enrico Zaina (ITA)	Asics–CGA	+ 5' 07"
5	Roberto Heras (ESP)	Kelme–Costa Blanca	+ 6' 17"
6	Marcos-Antonio Serrano (ESP)	Kelme–Costa Blanca	+ 7' 10"
7	Daniel Clavero (ESP)	Estepona en Marcha–Cafés Toscaf	+ 7' 29"
8	Laurent Jalabert (FRA)	ONCE	+ 9' 56"
9	Gianni Faresin (ITA)	Mapei–GB	+ 11' 10"
10	Yvon Ledanois (FRA)	GAN	+ 11' 22"

== Stage 17 ==
22 September 1997 — Santander to Burgos, 165.7 km (103.0 mi)

Stage 17 result

Rank	Rider	Team	Time
1	Ján Svorada (CZE)	Mapei–GB	4h 16' 02"
2	Marcel Wüst (GER)	Festina–Lotus	s.t.
3	Sven Teutenberg (GER)	U.S. Postal Service	s.t.
4	Fabrizio Guidi (ITA)	Scrigno–Gaerne	s.t.
5	Léon van Bon (NED)	Rabobank	s.t.
6	Alessio Di Basco (ITA)	Saeco–Estro	s.t.
7	Lars Michaelsen (DEN)	TVM–Farm Frites	s.t.
8	Claudio Camin (ITA)	Brescialat–Oyster	s.t.
9	Mauro Bettin (ITA)	Refin–Mobilvetta	s.t.
10	Jürgen Werner (GER)	Refin–Mobilvetta	s.t.

General classification after Stage 17

Rank	Rider	Team	Time
1	Alex Zülle (SUI)	ONCE	73h 08' 04"
2	Fernando Escartín (ESP)	Kelme–Costa Blanca	+ 2' 46"
3	Laurent Dufaux (SUI)	Festina–Lotus	+ 3' 39"
4	Enrico Zaina (ITA)	Asics–CGA	+ 5' 07"
5	Roberto Heras (ESP)	Kelme–Costa Blanca	+ 6' 17"
6	Marcos-Antonio Serrano (ESP)	Kelme–Costa Blanca	+ 7' 10"
7	Daniel Clavero (ESP)	Estepona en Marcha–Cafés Toscaf	+ 7' 29"
8	Laurent Jalabert (FRA)	ONCE	+ 9' 51"
9	Gianni Faresin (ITA)	Mapei–GB	+ 11' 10"
10	Yvon Ledanois (FRA)	GAN	+ 11' 22"

== Stage 18 ==
23 September 1997 — Burgos to Valladolid, 183.7 km (114.1 mi)

Stage 18 result

Rank	Rider	Team	Time
1	Léon van Bon (NED)	Rabobank	3h 52' 30"
2	Laurent Brochard (FRA)	Festina–Lotus	s.t.
3	Stefano Colagè (ITA)	Refin–Mobilvetta	s.t.
4	Mariano Piccoli (ITA)	Brescialat–Oyster	s.t.
5	Claudio Chiappucci (ITA)	Asics–CGA	s.t.
6	José Vicente García (ESP)	Banesto	s.t.
7	Viatcheslav Ekimov (RUS)	U.S. Postal Service	s.t.
8	Igor González de Galdeano (ESP)	Equipo Euskadi	s.t.
9	Sergei Uslamin (RUS)	Refin–Mobilvetta	+ 37"
10	Dario Pieri (ITA)	Scrigno–Gaerne	+ 4' 25"

General classification after Stage 18

Rank	Rider	Team	Time
1	Alex Zülle (SUI)	ONCE	77h 04' 59"
2	Fernando Escartín (ESP)	Kelme–Costa Blanca	+ 2' 46"
3	Laurent Dufaux (SUI)	Festina–Lotus	+ 3' 39"
4	Enrico Zaina (ITA)	Asics–CGA	+ 5' 07"
5	Roberto Heras (ESP)	Kelme–Costa Blanca	+ 6' 17"
6	Marcos-Antonio Serrano (ESP)	Kelme–Costa Blanca	+ 7' 10"
7	Daniel Clavero (ESP)	Estepona en Marcha–Cafés Toscaf	+ 7' 29"
8	Laurent Jalabert (FRA)	ONCE	+ 9' 51"
9	Gianni Faresin (ITA)	Mapei–GB	+ 11' 10"
10	Yvon Ledanois (FRA)	GAN	+ 11' 22"

== Stage 19 ==
24 September 1997 — Valladolid to Los Ángeles de San Rafael, 193.3 km (120.1 mi)

Stage 19 result

Rank	Rider	Team	Time
1	José María Jiménez (ESP)	Banesto	4h 31' 38"
2	Daniel Clavero (ESP)	Estepona en Marcha–Cafés Toscaf	+ 1"
3	Roberto Heras (ESP)	Kelme–Costa Blanca	s.t.
4	Pascal Richard (SUI)	Casino	+ 18"
5	Laurent Jalabert (FRA)	ONCE	+ 31"
6	Sergei Ivanov (RUS)	TVM–Farm Frites	s.t.
7	Laurent Brochard (FRA)	Festina–Lotus	s.t.
8	Gianni Faresin (ITA)	Mapei–GB	s.t.
9	Philippe Bordenave (FRA)	Casino	s.t.
10	Félix García Casas (ESP)	Festina–Lotus	s.t.

General classification after Stage 19

Rank	Rider	Team	Time
1	Alex Zülle (SUI)	ONCE	81h 37' 27"
2	Fernando Escartín (ESP)	Kelme–Costa Blanca	+ 2' 46"
3	Laurent Dufaux (SUI)	Festina–Lotus	+ 3' 39"
4	Enrico Zaina (ITA)	Asics–CGA	+ 5' 07"
5	Roberto Heras (ESP)	Kelme–Costa Blanca	+ 5' 24"
6	Daniel Clavero (ESP)	Estepona en Marcha–Cafés Toscaf	+ 6' 32"
7	Marcos-Antonio Serrano (ESP)	Kelme–Costa Blanca	+ 6' 59"
8	Laurent Jalabert (FRA)	ONCE	+ 9' 29"
9	Gianni Faresin (ITA)	Mapei–GB	+ 10' 51"
10	Yvon Ledanois (FRA)	GAN	+ 11' 22"

== Stage 20 ==
25 September 1997 — Los Ángeles de San Rafael to Ávila, 199.4 km (123.9 mi)

Stage 20 result

Rank	Rider	Team	Time
1	Laurent Jalabert (FRA)	ONCE	5h 17' 09"
2	Sergei Ivanov (RUS)	TVM–Farm Frites	+ 1"
3	Laurent Dufaux (SUI)	Festina–Lotus	s.t.
4	Enrico Zaina (ITA)	Asics–CGA	+ 2"
5	José María Jiménez (ESP)	Banesto	s.t.
6	Alex Zülle (SUI)	ONCE	s.t.
7	Fernando Escartín (ESP)	Kelme–Costa Blanca	s.t.
8	Pascal Richard (SUI)	Casino	s.t.
9	Laurent Brochard (FRA)	Festina–Lotus	s.t.
10	Roberto Heras (ESP)	Kelme–Costa Blanca	+ 7"

General classification after Stage 20

Rank	Rider	Team	Time
1	Alex Zülle (SUI)	ONCE	86h 54' 38"
2	Fernando Escartín (ESP)	Kelme–Costa Blanca	+ 2' 46"
3	Laurent Dufaux (SUI)	Festina–Lotus	+ 3' 33"
4	Enrico Zaina (ITA)	Asics–CGA	+ 5' 05"
5	Roberto Heras (ESP)	Kelme–Costa Blanca	+ 5' 29"
6	Daniel Clavero (ESP)	Estepona en Marcha–Cafés Toscaf	+ 6' 37"
7	Marcos-Antonio Serrano (ESP)	Kelme–Costa Blanca	+ 7' 04"
8	Laurent Jalabert (FRA)	ONCE	+ 9' 12"
9	Gianni Faresin (ITA)	Mapei–GB	+ 10' 56"
10	Yvon Ledanois (FRA)	GAN	+ 11' 27"

== Stage 21 ==
26 September 1997 — Alcobendas to Alcobendas, 43.7 km (27.2 mi) (ITT)

Stage 21 result

Rank	Rider	Team	Time
1	Alex Zülle (SUI)	ONCE	51' 35"
2	Serhiy Honchar (UKR)	Aki–Safi	+ 31"
3	Alberto Leanizbarrutia (ESP)	ONCE	+ 40"
4	Laurent Jalabert (FRA)	ONCE	+ 51"
5	Melcior Mauri (ESP)	ONCE	+ 56"
6	Tony Rominger (SUI)	Cofidis	+ 1' 26"
7	Juan Carlos Domínguez (ESP)	Kelme–Costa Blanca	+ 1' 30"
8	Cristian Salvato (ITA)	Refin–Mobilvetta	+ 2' 13"
9	Enrico Zaina (ITA)	Asics–CGA	+ 2' 19"
10	Fernando Escartín (ESP)	Kelme–Costa Blanca	+ 2' 21"

General classification after Stage 21

Rank	Rider	Team	Time
1	Alex Zülle (SUI)	ONCE	87h 46' 13"
2	Fernando Escartín (ESP)	Kelme–Costa Blanca	+ 5' 07"
3	Laurent Dufaux (SUI)	Festina–Lotus	+ 6' 11"
4	Enrico Zaina (ITA)	Asics–CGA	+ 7' 24"
5	Roberto Heras (ESP)	Kelme–Costa Blanca	+ 8' 04"
6	Daniel Clavero (ESP)	Estepona en Marcha–Cafés Toscaf	+ 10' 02"
7	Laurent Jalabert (FRA)	ONCE	+ 10' 03"
8	Marcos-Antonio Serrano (ESP)	Kelme–Costa Blanca	+ 10' 40"
9	Gianni Faresin (ITA)	Mapei–GB	+ 13' 53"
10	Yvon Ledanois (FRA)	GAN	+ 15' 40"

== Stage 22 ==
27 September 1997 — Madrid to Madrid, 154.6 km (96.1 mi)

Stage 22 result

Rank	Rider	Team	Time
1	Max van Heeswijk (NED)	Rabobank	3h 29' 42"
2	Ján Svorada (CZE)	Mapei–GB	s.t.
3	Marcel Wüst (GER)	Festina–Lotus	s.t.
4	Claudio Camin (ITA)	Brescialat–Oyster	s.t.
5	Lars Michaelsen (DEN)	TVM–Farm Frites	s.t.
6	Fabrizio Guidi (ITA)	Scrigno–Gaerne	s.t.
7	Aart Vierhouten (NED)	Rabobank	s.t.
8	Alessio Di Basco (ITA)	Saeco–Estro	s.t.
9	Biagio Conte (ITA)	Scrigno–Gaerne	s.t.
10	Gianluca Gorini (ITA)	Aki–Safi	s.t.

General classification after Stage 22

Rank	Rider	Team	Time
1	Alex Zülle (SUI)	ONCE	91h 15' 55"
2	Fernando Escartín (ESP)	Kelme–Costa Blanca	+ 5' 07"
3	Laurent Dufaux (SUI)	Festina–Lotus	+ 6' 11"
4	Enrico Zaina (ITA)	Asics–CGA	+ 7' 24"
5	Roberto Heras (ESP)	Kelme–Costa Blanca	+ 8' 04"
6	Daniel Clavero (ESP)	Estepona en Marcha–Cafés Toscaf	+ 10' 02"
7	Laurent Jalabert (FRA)	ONCE	+ 10' 03"
8	Marcos-Antonio Serrano (ESP)	Kelme–Costa Blanca	+ 10' 40"
9	Gianni Faresin (ITA)	Mapei–GB	+ 13' 53"
10	Yvon Ledanois (FRA)	GAN	+ 15' 40"
