= List of teams and cyclists in the 2000 Giro d'Italia =

The 2000 Giro d'Italia was the 83rd edition of the Giro d'Italia, one of cycling's Grand Tours. The field consisted of 180 riders, and 127 riders finished the race.

== By rider ==
Legend
No.	Starting number worn by the rider during the Giro
Pos.	Position in the general classification
DNF	Denotes a rider who did not finish

No.	Name	Nationality	Team	Pos.	Ref
1	Ivan Gotti	Italy	Team Polti	19	
2	Jeroen Blijlevens	Netherlands	Team Polti	98	
3	Enrico Cassani	Italy	Team Polti	76	
4	Daniel Clavero	Spain	Team Polti	DNF	
5	Silvio Martinello	Italy	Team Polti	105	
6	Eddy Mazzoleni	Italy	Team Polti	55	
7	Oscar Pelliccioli	Italy	Team Polti	35	
8	José Manuel Uría	Spain	Team Polti	43	
9	Bart Voskamp	Netherlands	Team Polti	123	
11	Mauro Gerosa	Italy	Amica Chips–Tacconi Sport	97	
12	Ivan Basso	Italy	Amica Chips–Tacconi Sport	52	
13	Pietro Caucchioli	Italy	Amica Chips–Tacconi Sport	85	
14	Diego Ferrari	Italy	Amica Chips–Tacconi Sport	115	
15	Vitali Kokorin	Russia	Amica Chips–Tacconi Sport	51	
16	Giuseppe Palumbo	Italy	Amica Chips–Tacconi Sport	124	
17	Filippo Simeoni	Italy	Amica Chips–Tacconi Sport	104	
18	Ruslan Ivanov	Moldova	Amica Chips–Tacconi Sport	DNF	
19	Oscar Pozzi	Italy	Amica Chips–Tacconi Sport	61	
21	Dariusz Baranowski	Poland	Banesto	22	
22	Cândido Barbosa	Portugal	Banesto	89	
23	Tomasz Brożyna	Poland	Banesto	39	
24	Marzio Bruseghin	Italy	Banesto	69	
25	Eladio Jiménez	Spain	Banesto	46	
26	Francisco Mancebo	Spain	Banesto	20	
27	Unai Osa	Spain	Banesto	DNF	
28	Orlando Rodrigues	Portugal	Banesto	66	
29	Leonardo Piepoli	Italy	Banesto	10	
31	Danilo Di Luca	Italy	Cantina Tollo–Regain	DNF	
32	Cristian Gasperoni	Italy	Cantina Tollo–Regain	83	
33	Moreno Di Biase	Italy	Cantina Tollo–Regain	119	
34	Massimo Giunti	Italy	Cantina Tollo–Regain	63	
35	Gianpaolo Mondini	Italy	Cantina Tollo–Regain	109	
36	Roberto Sgambelluri	Italy	Cantina Tollo–Regain	33	
37	Andrea Tonti	Italy	Cantina Tollo–Regain	23	
38	Guido Trenti	United States	Cantina Tollo–Regain	99	
39	Marco Vergnani	Italy	Cantina Tollo–Regain	54	
41	Niklas Axelsson	Sweden	Ceramica Panaria–Gaerne	DNF	
42	Vladimir Duma	Ukraine	Ceramica Panaria–Gaerne	38	
43	Tom Leaper	United States	Ceramica Panaria–Gaerne	DNF	
44	Enrico Degano	Italy	Ceramica Panaria–Gaerne	DNF	
45	Domenico Romano	Italy	Ceramica Panaria–Gaerne	DNF	
46	Julio Alberto Pérez	Mexico	Ceramica Panaria–Gaerne	DNF	
47	Luca Cei	Italy	Ceramica Panaria–Gaerne	DNF	
48	Antonio Varriale	Italy	Ceramica Panaria–Gaerne	DNF	
49	Jauhen Senjuškin	Belarus	Ceramica Panaria–Gaerne	DNF	
51	Miguel van Kessel	Netherlands	Farm Frites	DNF	
52	Servais Knaven	Netherlands	Farm Frites	DNF	
53	Michel Lafis	Sweden	Farm Frites	70	
54	Robbie McEwen	Australia	Farm Frites	DNF	
55	Koos Moerenhout	Netherlands	Farm Frites	DNF	
56	Wim Vansevenant	Belgium	Farm Frites	DNF	
57	Martin van Steen	Netherlands	Farm Frites	DNF	
58	Justin Spinelli	United States	Farm Frites	DNF	
59	Pieter Vries	Netherlands	Farm Frites	108	
61	Fabio Baldato	Italy	Fassa Bortolo	DNF	
62	Wladimir Belli	Italy	Fassa Bortolo	7	
63	Andrea Ferrigato	Italy	Fassa Bortolo	95	
64	Marco Fincato	Italy	Fassa Bortolo	21	
65	Dario Frigo	Italy	Fassa Bortolo	13	
66	Dimitri Konyshev	Russia	Fassa Bortolo	57	
67	Andrea Peron	Italy	Fassa Bortolo	74	
68	Alessandro Petacchi	Italy	Fassa Bortolo	92	
69	Matteo Tosatto	Italy	Fassa Bortolo	DNF	
71	José Luis Rubiera	Spain	Kelme–Costa Blanca	8	
72	Óscar Sevilla	Spain	Kelme–Costa Blanca	16	
73	José Castelblanco	Colombia	Kelme–Costa Blanca	18	
74	Félix Cárdenas	Colombia	Kelme–Costa Blanca	DNF	
75	José Enrique Gutiérrez	Spain	Kelme–Costa Blanca	DNF	
76	Juan José de los Ángeles	Spain	Kelme–Costa Blanca	50	
77	Ricardo Otxoa	Spain	Kelme–Costa Blanca	42	
78	José Javier Gómez	Spain	Kelme–Costa Blanca	30	
79	Ángel Vicioso	Spain	Kelme–Costa Blanca	72	
81	Fabrizio Guidi	Italy	Française des Jeux	94	
82	Grzegorz Gwiazdowski	Poland	Française des Jeux	58	
83	Yvon Ledanois	France	Française des Jeux	DNF	
84	Bradley McGee	Australia	Française des Jeux	127	
85	Franck Perque	France	Française des Jeux	DNF	
86	Nicolas Vogondy	France	Française des Jeux	84	
87	Daniel Schnider	Switzerland	Française des Jeux	91	
88	Jean-Michel Tessier	France	Française des Jeux	DNF	
89	Jimmy Casper	France	Française des Jeux	DNF	
91	Gilberto Simoni	Italy	Lampre–Daikin	3	
92	Sergio Barbero	Italy	Lampre–Daikin	73	
93	Massimo Codol	Italy	Lampre–Daikin	47	
94	Ludo Dierckxsens	Belgium	Lampre–Daikin	DNF	
95	Simone Bertoletti	Italy	Lampre–Daikin	87	
96	Marco Della Vedova	Italy	Lampre–Daikin	48	
97	Gabriele Missaglia	Italy	Lampre–Daikin	45	
98	Mariano Piccoli	Italy	Lampre–Daikin	34	
99	Ján Svorada	Czech Republic	Lampre–Daikin	102	
101	Max Sciandri	Great Britain	Linda McCartney Racing Team	67	
102	Pascal Richard	Switzerland	Linda McCartney Racing Team	DNF	
103	Tayeb Braikia	Denmark	Linda McCartney Racing Team	114	
104	Bjørnar Vestøl	Norway	Linda McCartney Racing Team	125	
105	Ciarán Power	Ireland	Linda McCartney Racing Team	122	
106	Maurizio De Pasquale	Italy	Linda McCartney Racing Team	111	
107	David McKenzie	Australia	Linda McCartney Racing Team	113	
108	Matthew Stephens	Great Britain	Linda McCartney Racing Team	DNF	
109	Benjamin Brooks	Australia	Linda McCartney Racing Team	DNF	
111	Stefano Cattai	Italy	Liquigas–Pata	41	
112	Daniele Contrini	Italy	Liquigas–Pata	106	
113	Cristiano Frattini	Italy	Liquigas–Pata	DNF	
114	Serhiy Honchar	Ukraine	Liquigas–Pata	9	
115	Cristian Moreni	Italy	Liquigas–Pata	DNF	
116	Davide Rebellin	Italy	Liquigas–Pata	29	
117	Alessandro Spezialetti	Italy	Liquigas–Pata	DNF	
118	Denis Zanette	Italy	Liquigas–Pata	DNF	
119	Marco Zanotti	Italy	Liquigas–Pata	116	
121	Davide Bramati	Italy	Mapei–Quick-Step	75	
122	Rinaldo Nocentini	Italy	Mapei–Quick-Step	64	
123	Giuliano Figueras	Italy	Mapei–Quick-Step	DNF	
124	Paolo Fornaciari	Italy	Mapei–Quick-Step	79	
125	Paolo Lanfranchi	Italy	Mapei–Quick-Step	12	
126	Chann McRae	United States	Mapei–Quick-Step	17	
127	Andrea Noè	Italy	Mapei–Quick-Step	4	
128	Pavel Tonkov	Russia	Mapei–Quick-Step	5	
129	Axel Merckx	Belgium	Mapei–Quick-Step	25	
131	Stefano Garzelli	Italy	Mercatone Uno–Albacom	1	
132	Daniele De Paoli	Italy	Mercatone Uno–Albacom	36	
133	Marco Velo	Italy	Mercatone Uno–Albacom	DNF	
134	Enrico Zaina	Italy	Mercatone Uno–Albacom	DNF	
135	Ermanno Brignoli	Italy	Mercatone Uno–Albacom	82	
136	Simone Borgheresi	Italy	Mercatone Uno–Albacom	112	
137	Riccardo Forconi	Italy	Mercatone Uno–Albacom	27	
138	Fabiano Fontanelli	Italy	Mercatone Uno–Albacom	93	
139	Marco Pantani	Italy	Mercatone Uno–Albacom	28	
141	Evgeni Berzin	Russia	Mobilvetta Design–Rossin	DNF	
142	Filippo Baldo	Italy	Mobilvetta Design–Rossin	32	
143	Ivan Quaranta	Italy	Mobilvetta Design–Rossin	DNF	
144	Mirco Gualdi	Italy	Mobilvetta Design–Rossin	40	
145	Mario Manzoni	Italy	Mobilvetta Design–Rossin	86	
146	Milan Kadlec	Czech Republic	Mobilvetta Design–Rossin	100	
147	Graziano Recinella	Italy	Mobilvetta Design–Rossin	DNF	
148	Paolo Valoti	Italy	Mobilvetta Design–Rossin	DNF	
149	Alberto Ongarato	Italy	Mobilvetta Design–Rossin	90	
151	José Jaime González	Colombia	Aguardiente Néctar–Selle Italia	31	
152	Hernán Buenahora	Colombia	Aguardiente Néctar–Selle Italia	6	
153	Raúl Montaña	Colombia	Aguardiente Néctar–Selle Italia	65	
154	Fredy González	Colombia	Aguardiente Néctar–Selle Italia	DNF	
155	Ruber Marín	Colombia	Aguardiente Néctar–Selle Italia	77	
156	Andris Naudužs	Latvia	Aguardiente Néctar–Selle Italia	DNF	
157	Fortunato Baliani	Italy	Aguardiente Néctar–Selle Italia	71	
158	Alessio Girelli	Italy	Aguardiente Néctar–Selle Italia	DNF	
159	Leonardo Scarselli	Italy	Aguardiente Néctar–Selle Italia	107	
161	Niki Aebersold	Switzerland	Rabobank	68	
162	Erik Dekker	Netherlands	Rabobank	121	
163	Coen Boerman	Netherlands	Rabobank	DNF	
164	Steven de Jongh	Netherlands	Rabobank	126	
165	Addy Engels	Netherlands	Rabobank	80	
166	Karsten Kroon	Netherlands	Rabobank	103	
167	Matthé Pronk	Netherlands	Rabobank	110	
168	Aart Vierhouten	Netherlands	Rabobank	DNF	
169	Marcel Duijn	Netherlands	Rabobank	DNF	
171	Mario Cipollini	Italy	Saeco–Valli & Valli	DNF	
172	Paolo Savoldelli	Italy	Saeco–Valli & Valli	24	
173	Giuseppe Calcaterra	Italy	Saeco–Valli & Valli	118	
174	Alessio Galletti	Italy	Saeco–Valli & Valli	120	
175	Pavel Padrnos	Czech Republic	Saeco–Valli & Valli	26	
176	Dario Pieri	Italy	Saeco–Valli & Valli	DNF	
177	Biagio Conte	Italy	Saeco–Valli & Valli	78	
178	Mario Scirea	Italy	Saeco–Valli & Valli	56	
179	Francesco Secchiari	Italy	Saeco–Valli & Valli	59	
181	Francesco Casagrande	Italy	Vini Caldirola–Sidermec	2	
182	Massimo Donati	Italy	Vini Caldirola–Sidermec	53	
183	Roberto Conti	Italy	Vini Caldirola–Sidermec	44	
184	Mauro Zanetti	Italy	Vini Caldirola–Sidermec	62	
185	Marco Milesi	Italy	Vini Caldirola–Sidermec	117	
186	Gianluca Bortolami	Italy	Vini Caldirola–Sidermec	96	
187	Matthew White	Australia	Vini Caldirola–Sidermec	101	
188	Filippo Casagrande	Italy	Vini Caldirola–Sidermec	60	
189	Ruggero Borghi	Italy	Vini Caldirola–Sidermec	DNF	
191	Elio Aggiano	Italy	Vitalicio Seguros	81	
192	Santiago Blanco	Spain	Vitalicio Seguros	11	
193	Luis Orán Castañeda	Colombia	Vitalicio Seguros	88	
194	Juan Carlos Domínguez	Spain	Vitalicio Seguros	DNF	
195	Jan Hruška	Czech Republic	Vitalicio Seguros	14	
196	Álvaro González de Galdeano	Spain	Vitalicio Seguros	49	
197	Miguel Ángel Martín Perdiguero	Spain	Vitalicio Seguros	37	
198	Iván Parra	Colombia	Vitalicio Seguros	DNF	
199	Víctor Hugo Peña	Colombia	Vitalicio Seguros	15	
