= List of teams and cyclists in the 1992 Giro d'Italia =

The 1992 Giro d'Italia was the 75th edition of the Giro d'Italia, one of cycling's Grand Tours. The field consisted of 180 riders, and 148 riders finished the race.

== By rider ==
Legend
No.	Starting number worn by the rider during the Giro
Pos.	Position in the general classification
DNF	Denotes a rider who did not finish

No.	Name	Nationality	Team	Ref
1	Franco Chioccioli	Italy	GB–MG Maglificio	
2	Franco Vona	Italy	GB–MG Maglificio	
3	Roberto Gusmeroli	Italy	GB–MG Maglificio	
4	Francesco Cesarini	Italy	GB–MG Maglificio	
5	Eros Poli	Italy	GB–MG Maglificio	
6	Luca Gelfi	Italy	GB–MG Maglificio	
7	Zenon Jaskuła	Poland	GB–MG Maglificio	
8	Mario Cipollini	Italy	GB–MG Maglificio	
9	Flavio Vanzella	Italy	GB–MG Maglificio	
11	Gianluigi Barsotelli	Italy	Amore & Vita–Fanini	
12	Giuseppe Calcaterra	Italy	Amore & Vita–Fanini	
13	Fabrizio Convalle	Italy	Amore & Vita–Fanini	
14	Stefano Della Santa	Italy	Amore & Vita–Fanini	
15	Alessio Di Basco	Italy	Amore & Vita–Fanini	
16	Stefano Giraldi	Italy	Amore & Vita–Fanini	
17	Maurizio Molinari	Italy	Amore & Vita–Fanini	
18	Bruno Risi	Switzerland	Amore & Vita–Fanini	
19	Jesper Worre	Denmark	Amore & Vita–Fanini	
21	Fabrice Philipot	France	Banesto	
22	Armand de Las Cuevas	France	Banesto	
23	Fabian Fuchs	Switzerland	Banesto	
24	Rubén Gorospe	Spain	Banesto	
25	Miguel Induráin	Spain	Banesto	
26	Prudencio Induráin	Spain	Banesto	
27	Luis Javier Lukin	Spain	Banesto	
28	José Luis Santamaría	Spain	Banesto	
29	José Ramón Uriarte	Spain	Banesto	
31	Claudio Chiappucci	Italy	Carrera Jeans–Vagabond	
32	Djamolidine Abdoujaparov	Uzbekistan	Carrera Jeans–Vagabond	
33	Vladimir Poulnikov	Ukraine	Carrera Jeans–Vagabond	
34	Alessandro Giannelli	Italy	Carrera Jeans–Vagabond	
35	Massimo Ghirotto	Italy	Carrera Jeans–Vagabond	
36	Henry Cárdenas	Colombia	Carrera Jeans–Vagabond	
37	Fabio Roscioli	Italy	Carrera Jeans–Vagabond	
38	Giancarlo Perini	Italy	Carrera Jeans–Vagabond	
39	Guido Bontempi	Italy	Carrera Jeans–Vagabond	
41	Gérard Rué	France	Castorama	
42	Dominique Arnould	France	Castorama	
43	Thierry Marie	France	Castorama	
44	Philippe Bouvatier	France	Castorama	
45	Jacky Durand	France	Castorama	
46	Hans Kindberg	Sweden	Castorama	
47	Yvon Ledanois	France	Castorama	
48	Thomas Davy	France	Castorama	
49	François Simon	France	Castorama	
51	Adriano Baffi	Italy	Ariostea	
52	Davide Cassani	Italy	Ariostea	
53	Marco Saligari	Italy	Ariostea	
54	Roberto Conti	Italy	Ariostea	
55	Andrea Ferrigato	Italy	Ariostea	
56	Giorgio Furlan	Italy	Ariostea	
57	Massimiliano Lelli	Italy	Ariostea	
58	Marco Lietti	Italy	Ariostea	
59	Bjarne Riis	Denmark	Ariostea	
61	Sean Kelly	Ireland	Lotus–Festina	
62	Mauro Gianetti	Switzerland	Lotus–Festina	
63	Pascal Richard	Switzerland	Lotus–Festina	
64	Romes Gainetdinov	Russia	Lotus–Festina	
65	Ramón González Arrieta	Spain	Lotus–Festina	
66	Juan Tomás Martínez	Spain	Lotus–Festina	
67	Juan Valbuena	Spain	Lotus–Festina	
68	Roberto Pagnin	Italy	Lotus–Festina	
69	Acácio da Silva	Portugal	Lotus–Festina	
71	Laurent Fignon	France	Gatorade–Chateau d'Ax	
72	Marco Giovannetti	Italy	Gatorade–Chateau d'Ax	
73	Dirk De Wolf	Belgium	Gatorade–Chateau d'Ax	
74	Abelardo Rondón	Colombia	Gatorade–Chateau d'Ax	
75	Giovanni Fidanza	Italy	Gatorade–Chateau d'Ax	
76	Ivan Gotti	Italy	Gatorade–Chateau d'Ax	
77	Stefano Zanatta	Italy	Gatorade–Chateau d'Ax	
78	Mauro-Antonio Santaromita	Italy	Gatorade–Chateau d'Ax	
79	Alberto Volpi	Italy	Gatorade–Chateau d'Ax	
81	Stefano Allocchio	Italy	Italbonifica–Navigare	
82	Michele Coppolillo	Italy	Italbonifica–Navigare	
83	Fabiano Fontanelli	Italy	Italbonifica–Navigare	
84	Massimo Podenzana	Italy	Italbonifica–Navigare	
85	Michele Moro	Italy	Italbonifica–Navigare	
86	Fabrizio Settembrini	Italy	Italbonifica–Navigare	
87	Stefano Zanini	Italy	Italbonifica–Navigare	
88	Luboš Lom	Czechoslovakia	Italbonifica–Navigare	
89	Raimondo Vairetti	Italy	Italbonifica–Navigare	
91	Paolo Botarelli	Italy	Jolly Componibili–Club 88	
92	Stefano Cattai	Italy	Jolly Componibili–Club 88	
93	Salvatore Criscione	Italy	Jolly Componibili–Club 88	
94	Endrio Leoni	Italy	Jolly Componibili–Club 88	
95	Dario Mariuzzo	Italy	Jolly Componibili–Club 88	
96	Rodolfo Massi	Italy	Jolly Componibili–Club 88	
97	Marcello Siboni	Italy	Jolly Componibili–Club 88	
98	Daniel Steiger	Switzerland	Jolly Componibili–Club 88	
99	Massimo Strazzer	Italy	Jolly Componibili–Club 88	
101	Gianluca Bortolami	Italy	Lampre–Colnago	
102	Fabrizio Bontempi	Italy	Lampre–Colnago	
103	Davide Bramati	Italy	Lampre–Colnago	
104	Dario Nicoletti	Italy	Lampre–Colnago	
105	Maurizio Piovani	Italy	Lampre–Colnago	
106	Ján Svorada	Czechoslovakia	Lampre–Colnago	
107	Zbigniew Spruch	Poland	Lampre–Colnago	
108	Marek Szerszyński	Poland	Lampre–Colnago	
109	Pavel Tonkov	Russia	Lampre–Colnago	
111	Flavio Giupponi	Italy	Mercatone Uno–Medeghini–Zucchini	
112	Enrico Zaina	Italy	Mercatone Uno–Medeghini–Zucchini	
113	Giuseppe Petito	Italy	Mercatone Uno–Medeghini–Zucchini	
114	Silvio Martinello	Italy	Mercatone Uno–Medeghini–Zucchini	
115	Bruno Leali	Italy	Mercatone Uno–Medeghini–Zucchini	
116	Fabio Bordonali	Italy	Mercatone Uno–Medeghini–Zucchini	
117	Nico Emonds	Belgium	Mercatone Uno–Medeghini–Zucchini	
118	Angelo Canzonieri	Italy	Mercatone Uno–Medeghini–Zucchini	
119	Angelo Pierdomenico	Italy	Mercatone Uno–Medeghini–Zucchini	
121	Andrew Hampsten	United States	Motorola	
122	Norman Alvis	United States	Motorola	
123	Steve Bauer	Canada	Motorola	
124	Michel Dernies	Belgium	Motorola	
125	Jan Schur	Germany	Motorola	
126	Max Sciandri	Italy	Motorola	
127	Brian Walton	Canada	Motorola	
128	Sean Yates	Great Britain	Motorola	
129	Urs Zimmermann	Switzerland	Motorola	
131	Xabier Aldanondo	Spain	ONCE	
132	Luis María Díaz De Otazu	Spain	ONCE	
133	Pedro Díaz Zabala	Spain	ONCE	
134	Anselmo Fuerte	Spain	ONCE	
135	Laurent Jalabert	France	ONCE	
136	Joan Llaneras	Spain	ONCE	
137	Neil Stephens	Australia	ONCE	
138	José Luis Villanueva	Spain	ONCE	
139	Johnny Weltz	Denmark	ONCE	
141	Luis Herrera	Colombia	Postobón–Manzana–Ryalcao	
142	Ruber Marín	Colombia	Postobón–Manzana–Ryalcao	
143	Luis Espinosa	Colombia	Postobón–Manzana–Ryalcao	
144	Raúl Acosta	Colombia	Postobón–Manzana–Ryalcao	
145	Jonas Romanovas	Lithuania	Postobón–Manzana–Ryalcao	
146	Remigijus Lupeikis	Lithuania	Postobón–Manzana–Ryalcao	
147	Julio César Ortegón	Colombia	Postobón–Manzana–Ryalcao	
148	Gerardo Moncada	Colombia	Postobón–Manzana–Ryalcao	
149	Efraín Rico	Colombia	Postobón–Manzana–Ryalcao	
151	José Urea	Spain	Seur	
152	Piotr Ugrumov	Latvia	Seur	
153	Malcolm Elliott	Great Britain	Seur	
154	Viktor Klimov	Ukraine	Seur	
155	José Rodríguez	Spain	Seur	
156	Peter Hilse	Germany	Seur	
157	Viktor Rjaksinski	Ukraine	Seur	
158	Pablo Moreno	Spain	Seur	
159	Iván Alemany	Spain	Seur	
161	Uwe Ampler	Germany	Team Telekom	
162	Udo Bölts	Germany	Team Telekom	
163	Peter Farazijn	Belgium	Team Telekom	
164	Bernd Gröne	Germany	Team Telekom	
165	Josef Holzmann	Germany	Team Telekom	
166	Christian Henn	Germany	Team Telekom	
167	Jens Heppner	Germany	Team Telekom	
168	Andreas Kappes	Germany	Team Telekom	
169	Markus Schiecher	Germany	Team Telekom	
171	Luc Roosen	Belgium	Tulip Computers	
172	Allan Peiper	Australia	Tulip Computers	
173	Harry Lodge	Great Britain	Tulip Computers	
174	Rudy Rogiers	Belgium	Tulip Computers	
175	Johnny Dauwe	Belgium	Tulip Computers	
176	Olaf Jentzsch	Germany	Tulip Computers	
177	Brian Holm	Denmark	Tulip Computers	
178	Søren Lilholt	Denmark	Tulip Computers	
179	Raymond Meijs	Netherlands	Tulip Computers	
181	Kim Andersen	Denmark	Z	
182	Laurent Bezault	France	Z	
183	Christophe Capelle	France	Z	
184	Philippe Casado	France	Z	
185	Bruno Cornillet	France	Z	
186	Thierry Gouvenou	France	Z	
187	Pascal Lance	France	Z	
188	Johan Lammerts	Netherlands	Z	
189	Eddy Seigneur	France	Z	
191	Leonardo Sierra	Venezuela	ZG Mobili–Selle Italia	
192	Gianni Faresin	Italy	ZG Mobili–Selle Italia	
193	Stefano Colagè	Italy	ZG Mobili–Selle Italia	
194	Nelson Rodríguez Serna	Colombia	ZG Mobili–Selle Italia	
195	Mario Mantovan	Italy	ZG Mobili–Selle Italia	
196	Felice Puttini	Switzerland	ZG Mobili–Selle Italia	
197	Diego Trepin	Italy	ZG Mobili–Selle Italia	
198	Davide Perona	Italy	ZG Mobili–Selle Italia	
199	Giovanni Strazzer	Italy	ZG Mobili–Selle Italia	
