= 1992 Giro d'Italia, Stage 1 to Stage 11 =

Cycling race stages

The 1992 Giro d'Italia was the 75th edition of the Giro d'Italia, one of cycling's Grand Tours. The Giro began in Genoa, with an individual time trial on 24 May, and Stage 11 occurred on 3 June with a stage to Imola. The race finished in Milan on 14 June.

== Stage 1 ==
24 May 1992 — Genoa, 8 km (5.0 mi) (ITT)

Stage 1 result and general classification after Stage 1

Rank	Rider	Team	Time
1	Thierry Marie (FRA)	Castorama	9' 59"
2	Miguel Induráin (ESP)	Banesto	+ 3"
3	Julio César Ortegón (COL)	Postobón–Manzana–Ryalcao	+ 10"
4	Joan Llaneras (ESP)	ONCE	s.t.
5	Laurent Bezault (FRA)	Z	+ 13"
6	Jacky Durand (FRA)	Castorama	+ 14"
7	Yvon Ledanois (FRA)	Castorama	s.t.
8	Adriano Baffi (ITA)	Ariostea	+ 15"
9	Guido Bontempi (ITA)	Carrera Jeans–Vagabond	s.t.
10	Franco Chioccioli (ITA)	GB–MG Maglificio	s.t.

== Stage 2 ==
25 May 1992 — Genoa to Uliveto Terme, 198 km (123 mi)

Stage 2 result

Rank	Rider	Team	Time
1	Endrio Leoni (ITA)	Jolly Componibili–Club 88	4h 48' 13"
2	Mario Cipollini (ITA)	GB–MG Maglificio	s.t.
3	Fabiano Fontanelli (ITA)	Italbonifica–Navigare	s.t.
4	Max Sciandri (ITA)	Motorola	s.t.
5	Silvio Martinello (ITA)	Mercatone Uno–Medeghini–Zucchini	s.t.
6	Djamolidine Abdoujaparov (UZB)	Carrera Jeans–Vagabond	s.t.
7	François Simon (FRA)	Castorama	s.t.
8	Massimo Strazzer (ITA)	Jolly Componibili–Club 88	s.t.
9	Bruno Risi (ITA)	Amore & Vita–Fanini	s.t.
10	Christian Henn (GER)	Team Telekom	s.t.

General classification after Stage 2

Rank	Rider	Team	Time
1	Thierry Marie (FRA)	Castorama	4h 58' 12"
2	Miguel Induráin (ESP)	Banesto	+ 3"
3	Julio César Ortegón (COL)	Postobón–Manzana–Ryalcao	+ 10"
4	Joan Llaneras (ESP)	ONCE	s.t.
5	Laurent Bezault (FRA)	Z	+ 13"
6	Jacky Durand (FRA)	Castorama	+ 14"
7	Yvon Ledanois (FRA)	Castorama	s.t.
8	Adriano Baffi (ITA)	Ariostea	+ 15"
9	Guido Bontempi (ITA)	Carrera Jeans–Vagabond	s.t.
10	Franco Chioccioli (ITA)	GB–MG Maglificio	s.t.

== Stage 3 ==
26 May 1992 — Uliveto Terme to Arezzo, 174 km (108 mi)

Stage 3 result

Rank	Rider	Team	Time
1	Max Sciandri (ITA)	Motorola	4h 29' 50"
2	Massimiliano Lelli (ITA)	Ariostea	s.t.
3	Yvon Ledanois (FRA)	Castorama	s.t.
4	Claudio Chiappucci (ITA)	Carrera Jeans–Vagabond	s.t.
5	Giorgio Furlan (ITA)	Ariostea	s.t.
6	Laurent Fignon (FRA)	Gatorade–Chateau d'Ax	s.t.
7	Nico Emonds (BEL)	Mercatone Uno–Medeghini–Zucchini	s.t.
8	Neil Stephens (AUS)	ONCE	s.t.
9	Armand de Las Cuevas (FRA)	Banesto	s.t.
10	Alberto Volpi (ITA)	Gatorade–Chateau d'Ax	s.t.

General classification after Stage 3

Rank	Rider	Team	Time
1	Miguel Induráin (ESP)	Banesto	9h 28' 05"
2	Yvon Ledanois (FRA)	Castorama	+ 7"
3	Laurent Bezault (FRA)	Z	+ 10"
4	Franco Chioccioli (ITA)	GB–MG Maglificio	+ 12"
5	Daniel Steiger (SUI)	Jolly Componibili–Club 88	+ 14"
6	Armand de Las Cuevas (FRA)	Banesto	+ 16"
7	Massimiliano Lelli (ITA)	Ariostea	s.t.
8	Max Sciandri (ITA)	Motorola	+ 18"
9	Claudio Chiappucci (ITA)	Carrera Jeans–Vagabond	+ 19"
10	Paolo Botarelli (ITA)	Jolly Componibili–Club 88	s.t.

== Stage 4 ==
27 May 1992 — Arezzo to Sansepolcro, 38 km (24 mi) (ITT)

Stage 4 result

Rank	Rider	Team	Time
1	Miguel Induráin (ESP)	Banesto	49' 32"
2	Armand de Las Cuevas (FRA)	Banesto	+ 32"
3	Laurent Bezault (FRA)	Z	+ 34"
4	Claudio Chiappucci (ITA)	Carrera Jeans–Vagabond	+ 1' 09"
5	Julio César Ortegón (COL)	Postobón–Manzana–Ryalcao	+ 1' 21"
6	Marco Giovannetti (ITA)	Gatorade–Chateau d'Ax	+ 1' 46"
7	Neil Stephens (AUS)	ONCE	+ 1' 55"
8	Zenon Jaskuła (POL)	GB–MG Maglificio	s.t.
9	Daniel Steiger (SUI)	Jolly Componibili–Club 88	+ 2' 03"
10	Stefano Della Santa (ITA)	Amore & Vita–Fanini	+ 2' 10"

General classification after Stage 4

Rank	Rider	Team	Time
1	Miguel Induráin (ESP)	Banesto	10h 17' 37"
2	Laurent Bezault (FRA)	Z	+ 44"
3	Armand de Las Cuevas (FRA)	Banesto	+ 48"
4	Claudio Chiappucci (ITA)	Carrera Jeans–Vagabond	+ 1' 28"
5	Marco Giovannetti (ITA)	Gatorade–Chateau d'Ax	+ 2' 07"
6	Julio César Ortegón (COL)	Postobón–Manzana–Ryalcao	s.t.
7	Daniel Steiger (SUI)	Jolly Componibili–Club 88	+ 2' 17"
8	Neil Stephens (AUS)	ONCE	+ 2' 20"
9	Franco Chioccioli (ITA)	GB–MG Maglificio	+ 2' 28"
10	Nico Emonds (BEL)	Mercatone Uno–Medeghini–Zucchini	+ 2' 43"

== Stage 5 ==
28 May 1992 — Sansepolcro to Porto Sant'Elpidio, 198 km (123 mi)

Stage 5 result

Rank	Rider	Team	Time
1	Mario Cipollini (ITA)	GB–MG Maglificio	5h 04' 29"
2	Adriano Baffi (ITA)	Ariostea	s.t.
3	Massimo Strazzer (ITA)	Jolly Componibili–Club 88	s.t.
4	Max Sciandri (ITA)	Motorola	s.t.
5	Stefano Allocchio (ITA)	Italbonifica–Navigare	s.t.
6	Massimo Strazzer (ITA)	Jolly Componibili–Club 88	s.t.
7	François Simon (FRA)	Castorama	s.t.
8	Hans Kindberg (SWE)	Castorama	s.t.
9	Remigijus Lupeikis (LTU)	Postobón–Manzana–Ryalcao	s.t.
10	Fabio Roscioli (ITA)	Carrera Jeans–Vagabond	s.t.

General classification after Stage 5

Rank	Rider	Team	Time
1	Miguel Induráin (ESP)	Banesto	15h 22' 06"
2	Laurent Bezault (FRA)	Z	+ 44"
3	Armand de Las Cuevas (FRA)	Banesto	+ 48"
4	Claudio Chiappucci (ITA)	Carrera Jeans–Vagabond	+ 1' 28"
5	Marco Giovannetti (ITA)	Gatorade–Chateau d'Ax	+ 2' 07"
6	Julio César Ortegón (COL)	Postobón–Manzana–Ryalcao	s.t.
7	Daniel Steiger (SUI)	Jolly Componibili–Club 88	+ 2' 17"
8	Neil Stephens (AUS)	ONCE	+ 2' 20"
9	Franco Chioccioli (ITA)	GB–MG Maglificio	+ 2' 28"
10	Nico Emonds (BEL)	Mercatone Uno–Medeghini–Zucchini	+ 2' 43"

== Stage 6 ==
29 May 1992 — Porto Sant'Elpidio to Sulmona, 223 km (139 mi)

Stage 6 result

Rank	Rider	Team	Time
1	Franco Vona (ITA)	GB–MG Maglificio	6h 23' 09"
2	Roberto Conti (ITA)	Ariostea	s.t.
3	Giorgio Furlan (ITA)	Ariostea	+ 8"
4	Gianni Faresin (ITA)	ZG Mobili–Selle Italia	+ 11"
5	Luis Herrera (COL)	Postobón–Manzana–Ryalcao	s.t.
6	Armand de Las Cuevas (FRA)	Banesto	+ 2' 33"
7	Claudio Chiappucci (ITA)	Carrera Jeans–Vagabond	s.t.
8	Dominique Arnould (FRA)	Castorama	s.t.
9	Miguel Induráin (ESP)	Banesto	s.t.
10	Zenon Jaskuła (POL)	GB–MG Maglificio	s.t.

General classification after Stage 6

Rank	Rider	Team	Time
1	Miguel Induráin (ESP)	Banesto	21h 47' 48"
2	Giorgio Furlan (ITA)	Ariostea	+ 30"
3	Armand de Las Cuevas (FRA)	Banesto	+ 48"
4	Roberto Conti (ITA)	Ariostea	+ 59"
5	Claudio Chiappucci (ITA)	Carrera Jeans–Vagabond	+ 1' 28"
6	Marco Giovannetti (ITA)	Gatorade–Chateau d'Ax	+ 2' 07"
7	Luis Herrera (COL)	Postobón–Manzana–Ryalcao	+ 2' 17"
8	Franco Chioccioli (ITA)	GB–MG Maglificio	+ 2' 28"
9	Franco Vona (ITA)	GB–MG Maglificio	+ 2' 31"
10	Zenon Jaskuła (POL)	GB–MG Maglificio	+ 2' 45"

== Stage 7 ==
30 May 1992 — Roccaraso to Melfi, 232 km (144 mi)

Stage 7 result

Rank	Rider	Team	Time
1	Guido Bontempi (ITA)	Carrera Jeans–Vagabond	6h 33' 26"
2	Giuseppe Petito (ITA)	Mercatone Uno–Medeghini–Zucchini	+ 3"
3	Angelo Pierdomenico (ITA)	Mercatone Uno–Medeghini–Zucchini	+ 56"
4	Franco Chioccioli (ITA)	GB–MG Maglificio	s.t.
5	Paolo Botarelli (ITA)	Jolly Componibili–Club 88	s.t.
6	Max Sciandri (ITA)	Motorola	s.t.
7	Fabio Bordonali (ITA)	Mercatone Uno–Medeghini–Zucchini	s.t.
8	Claudio Chiappucci (ITA)	Carrera Jeans–Vagabond	s.t.
9	Enrico Zaina (ITA)	Mercatone Uno–Medeghini–Zucchini	s.t.
10	Nico Emonds (BEL)	Mercatone Uno–Medeghini–Zucchini	s.t.

General classification after Stage 7

Rank	Rider	Team	Time
1	Miguel Induráin (ESP)	Banesto	28h 22' 10"
2	Giorgio Furlan (ITA)	Ariostea	+ 30"
3	Roberto Conti (ITA)	Ariostea	+ 59"
4	Armand de Las Cuevas (FRA)	Banesto	+ 1' 26"
5	Claudio Chiappucci (ITA)	Carrera Jeans–Vagabond	+ 1' 28"
6	Marco Giovannetti (ITA)	Gatorade–Chateau d'Ax	+ 2' 07"
7	Luis Herrera (COL)	Postobón–Manzana–Ryalcao	+ 2' 17"
8	Franco Chioccioli (ITA)	GB–MG Maglificio	+ 2' 28"
9	Franco Vona (ITA)	GB–MG Maglificio	+ 2' 31"
10	Zenon Jaskuła (POL)	GB–MG Maglificio	+ 2' 45"

== Stage 8 ==
31 May 1992 — Melfi to Aversa, 184 km (114 mi)

Stage 8 result

Rank	Rider	Team	Time
1	Mario Cipollini (ITA)	GB–MG Maglificio	5h 11' 59"
2	Endrio Leoni (ITA)	Jolly Componibili–Club 88	s.t.
3	Djamolidine Abdoujaparov (UZB)	Carrera Jeans–Vagabond	s.t.
4	Adriano Baffi (ITA)	Ariostea	s.t.
5	Giovanni Fidanza (ITA)	Gatorade–Chateau d'Ax	s.t.
6	Max Sciandri (ITA)	Motorola	s.t.
7	Dominique Arnould (FRA)	Castorama	s.t.
8	Stefano Allocchio (ITA)	Italbonifica–Navigare	s.t.
9	Alessio Di Basco (ITA)	Amore & Vita–Fanini	s.t.
10	Roberto Pagnin (ITA)	Lotus–Festina	s.t.

General classification after Stage 8

Rank	Rider	Team	Time
1	Miguel Induráin (ESP)	Banesto	33h 34' 09"
2	Giorgio Furlan (ITA)	Ariostea	+ 30"
3	Roberto Conti (ITA)	Ariostea	+ 59"
4	Armand de Las Cuevas (FRA)	Banesto	+ 1' 26"
5	Claudio Chiappucci (ITA)	Carrera Jeans–Vagabond	+ 1' 28"
6	Marco Giovannetti (ITA)	Gatorade–Chateau d'Ax	+ 2' 07"
7	Luis Herrera (COL)	Postobón–Manzana–Ryalcao	+ 2' 17"
8	Franco Chioccioli (ITA)	GB–MG Maglificio	+ 2' 28"
9	Franco Vona (ITA)	GB–MG Maglificio	+ 2' 31"
10	Zenon Jaskuła (POL)	GB–MG Maglificio	+ 2' 45"

== Stage 9 ==
1 June 1992 — Aversa to Latina, 165 km (103 mi)

Stage 9 result

Rank	Rider	Team	Time
1	Guido Bontempi (ITA)	Carrera Jeans–Vagabond	3h 48' 00"
2	Giovanni Fidanza (ITA)	Gatorade–Chateau d'Ax	s.t.
3	Bernd Gröne (GER)	Team Telekom	s.t.
4	Jens Heppner (GER)	Team Telekom	s.t.
5	Thierry Marie (FRA)	Castorama	s.t.
6	Davide Perona (ITA)	ZG Mobili–Selle Italia	s.t.
7	Brian Holm (DEN)	Tulip Computers	s.t.
8	Zenon Jaskuła (POL)	GB–MG Maglificio	s.t.
9	Eddy Seigneur (FRA)	Z	s.t.
10	Luc Roosen (BEL)	Tulip Computers	s.t.

General classification after Stage 9

Rank	Rider	Team	Time
1	Miguel Induráin (ESP)	Banesto	37h 21' 19"
2	Giorgio Furlan (ITA)	Ariostea	+ 30"
3	Roberto Conti (ITA)	Ariostea	+ 59"
4	Armand de Las Cuevas (FRA)	Banesto	+ 1' 26"
5	Claudio Chiappucci (ITA)	Carrera Jeans–Vagabond	+ 1' 28"
6	Marco Giovannetti (ITA)	Gatorade–Chateau d'Ax	+ 2' 07"
7	Luis Herrera (COL)	Postobón–Manzana–Ryalcao	+ 2' 17"
8	Franco Chioccioli (ITA)	GB–MG Maglificio	+ 2' 28"
9	Franco Vona (ITA)	GB–MG Maglificio	+ 2' 31"
10	Zenon Jaskuła (POL)	GB–MG Maglificio	+ 2' 45"

== Stage 10 ==
2 June 1992 — Latina to Monte Terminillo, 196 km (122 mi)

Stage 10 result

Rank	Rider	Team	Time
1	Luis Herrera (COL)	Postobón–Manzana–Ryalcao	5h 49' 46"
2	Flavio Giupponi (ITA)	Mercatone Uno–Medeghini–Zucchini	+ 2"
3	Andrew Hampsten (USA)	Motorola	s.t.
4	Marco Giovannetti (ITA)	Gatorade–Chateau d'Ax	s.t.
5	Miguel Induráin (ESP)	Banesto	s.t.
6	Roberto Conti (ITA)	Ariostea	s.t.
7	Claudio Chiappucci (ITA)	Carrera Jeans–Vagabond	+ 30"
8	Gianni Faresin (ITA)	ZG Mobili–Selle Italia	s.t.
9	Franco Vona (ITA)	GB–MG Maglificio	s.t.
10	Laurent Fignon (FRA)	Gatorade–Chateau d'Ax	+ 35"

General classification after Stage 10

Rank	Rider	Team	Time
1	Miguel Induráin (ESP)	Banesto	43h 11' 07"
2	Roberto Conti (ITA)	Ariostea	+ 59"
3	Claudio Chiappucci (ITA)	Carrera Jeans–Vagabond	+ 1' 56"
4	Luis Herrera (COL)	Postobón–Manzana–Ryalcao	+ 2' 03"
5	Marco Giovannetti (ITA)	Gatorade–Chateau d'Ax	+ 2' 07"
6	Andrew Hampsten (USA)	Motorola	+ 2' 42"
7	Zenon Jaskuła (POL)	GB–MG Maglificio	+ 2' 58"
8	Franco Vona (ITA)	GB–MG Maglificio	+ 2' 59"
9	Gianni Faresin (ITA)	ZG Mobili–Selle Italia	+ 4' 01"
10	Massimiliano Lelli (ITA)	Ariostea	+ 4' 27"

== Stage 11 ==
3 June 1992 — Montepulciano to Imola, 233 km (145 mi)

Stage 11 result

Rank	Rider	Team	Time
1	Roberto Pagnin (ITA)	Lotus–Festina	5h 59' 19"
2	Marco Lietti (ITA)	Ariostea	s.t.
3	Franco Chioccioli (ITA)	GB–MG Maglificio	s.t.
4	Sean Yates (GBR)	Motorola	+ 2' 06"
5	Romes Gainetdinov (RUS)	Lotus–Festina	s.t.
6	Massimiliano Lelli (ITA)	Ariostea	+ 2' 24"
7	Max Sciandri (ITA)	Motorola	s.t.
8	Enrico Zaina (ITA)	Mercatone Uno–Medeghini–Zucchini	s.t.
9	Zenon Jaskuła (POL)	GB–MG Maglificio	s.t.
10	Fabio Bordonali (ITA)	Mercatone Uno–Medeghini–Zucchini	s.t.

General classification after Stage 11

Rank	Rider	Team	Time
1	Miguel Induráin (ESP)	Banesto	49h 12' 50"
2	Roberto Conti (ITA)	Ariostea	+ 59"
3	Claudio Chiappucci (ITA)	Carrera Jeans–Vagabond	+ 1' 56"
4	Luis Herrera (COL)	Postobón–Manzana–Ryalcao	+ 2' 03"
5	Marco Giovannetti (ITA)	Gatorade–Chateau d'Ax	+ 2' 07"
6	Andrew Hampsten (USA)	Motorola	+ 2' 42"
7	Zenon Jaskuła (POL)	GB–MG Maglificio	+ 2' 58"
8	Franco Vona (ITA)	GB–MG Maglificio	+ 2' 59"
9	Franco Chioccioli (ITA)	GB–MG Maglificio	+ 3' 26"
10	Gianni Faresin (ITA)	ZG Mobili–Selle Italia	+ 4' 01"
