= 1997 Paris–Tours =

Race details
- Dates: 5 October 1997
- Stages: 1
- Distance: 256 km (159.1 mi)
- Winning time: 5h 23' 44"

Results
	Winner	Andrei Tchmil (UKR)	(Lotto–Mobistar–Isoglass)
	Second	Max Sciandri (GBR)	(Française des Jeux)
	Third	Henk Vogels (AUS)	(GAN)

The 1997 Paris–Tours was the 91st edition of the Paris–Tours cycle race and was held on 5 October 1997. The race started in Paris and finished in Tours. The race was won by Andrei Tchmil of the Lotto team.

== General classification ==
Final general classification

Rank	Rider	Team	Time
1	Andrei Tchmil (UKR)	Lotto–Mobistar–Isoglass	5h 23' 44"
2	Max Sciandri (GBR)	Française des Jeux	+ 1"
3	Henk Vogels (AUS)	GAN	+ 3"
4	Claudio Camin (ITA)	Brescialat–Oyster	+ 3"
5	Ján Svorada (CZE)	Mapei–GB	+ 3"
6	Mirko Rossato (ITA)	Scrigno–Gaerne	+ 3"
7	Biagio Conte (ITA)	Scrigno–Gaerne	+ 3"
8	Aart Vierhouten (NED)	Rabobank	+ 3"
9	Léon van Bon (NED)	Rabobank	+ 3"
10	Luca Gelfi (ITA)	Brescialat–Oyster	+ 3"
