= 1997 Volta a Catalunya =

Race details
- Dates: 19–26 June 1997
- Stages: 8
- Distance: 1,167.5 km (725.5 mi)
- Winning time: 31h 13' 49"

Results
	Winner	Fernando Escartín (ESP)	(Kelme–Costa Blanca)
	Second	Ángel Casero (ESP)	(Banesto)
	Third	Mikel Zarrabeitia (ESP)	(ONCE)
	Mountains	Héctor Palacio (COL)	(Flavia–Telecom)
	Sprints	Eleuterio Anguita (ESP)	(Estepona en Marcha–Cafés Toscaf)
	Team	Banesto	

The 1997 Volta a Catalunya was the 77th edition of the Volta a Catalunya cycle race and was held from 19 June to 26 June 1997. The race started in Vila-seca and finished in Andorra la Vella. The race was won by Fernando Escartín of the Kelme team.

== Teams ==
Thirteen teams started the race:

- ONCE
- Banesto
- Kelme–Costa Blanca
- Equipo Euskadi
- Estepona en Marcha–Cafés Toscaf
- Petroleo de Colombia
- Flavia–Telecom
- Asics–CGA
- Mapei–GB
- Team Polti
- TVM–Farm Frites
- Lotto–Mobistar–Isoglass
- GAN

== Route ==
Stage characteristics and winners
Stage	Date	Course	Distance	Type	Winner
1a	19 June	Vila-seca to La Pineda	71.9 km (44.7 mi)		Ján Svorada (CZE)
1b	19 June	Port Aventura to La Pineda	7.8 km (4.8 mi)	Individual time trial	Chris Boardman (GBR)
2	20 June	Port Aventura to Lerida	163 km (101.3 mi)		Ján Svorada (CZE)
3	21 June	Les Borges Blanques to Manresa	186.7 km (116.0 mi)		Serguei Outschakov (UKR)
4	22 June	Sant Joan Despí to Barcelona	129.7 km (80.6 mi)		Ján Svorada (CZE)
5	23 June	Vic to Vic	22.1 km (13.7 mi)	Individual time trial	Chris Boardman (GBR)
6	24 June	Vic Casa Tarradellas to Platja d'Aro	160.7 km (99.9 mi)		Fernando Escartín (ESP)
7	25 June	Gerona to Pal ski station	237 km (147.3 mi)		Bo Hamburger (DEN)
7	26 June	Andorra to Andorra	188.6 km (117.2 mi)		Serguei Outschakov (UKR)

== General classification ==
Final general classification

Rank	Rider	Team	Time
1	Fernando Escartín (ESP)	Kelme–Costa Blanca	31h 13' 49"
2	Ángel Casero (ESP)	Banesto	+ 2"
3	Mikel Zarrabeitia (ESP)	ONCE	+ 26"
4	Daniel Clavero (ESP)	Estepona en Marcha–Cafés Toscaf	+ 53"
5	Pavel Tonkov (RUS)	Mapei–GB	+ 1' 04"
6	Armand de Las Cuevas (FRA)	Banesto	+ 1' 19"
7	Bo Hamburger (DEN)	TVM–Farm Frites	+ 1' 30"
8	César Solaun (ESP)	Equipo Euskadi	+ 2' 07"
9	Marino Alonso (ESP)	Banesto	+ 2' 35"
10	Orlando Rodrigues (POR)	Banesto	+ 2' 52"
