= Vierhouten =

Vierhouten may refer to:

- Vierhouten, village in Nunspeet, Netherlands
- Aart Vierhouten (born 1970), Dutch cyclist
