= Francisco Cerezo =

Spanish cyclist

Personal information
- Full name: Francisco Javier Cerezo Perales
- Born: 6 January 1971 (age 55)

Cycling career
- Sport: Cycling
- Current team: Retired
- Discipline: Road
- Role: Rider

Professional teams
- 1992: Seur
- 1993–1998: Deportpublic - Otero
- 1999–2000: Vitalicio Seguros
- 2001–2002: CSC–Tiscali
- 2003: Cafés Baqué

Francisco Javier Cerezo Perales (born 1971), known as Francisco Cerezo for short, is a Spanish former professional road bicycle racer.

== Career ==
He rode at the Danish professional cycling team of CSC-Tiscali, which he joined in 2001 from the Spanish team Vitalicio Seguros. He left the team in 2002 to join the Spanish team Cafés Baqué. In the 2000 Vuelta a España he was involved in a heated argument, which turned violent, with Mario Cipollini resulting in Cipollini being kicked from the race and Cerezo needing three stitches in his face.

== Major results ==
1989
3rd Junior Time trial Championships
1992
4th Subida al Naranco
1993
1st Stage 1 Volta ao Alentejo
1994
1st Overall Grande Prémio Jornal de Notícias
1998
2nd Trofeo Luis Ocana
1999
2nd National Road race Championships
6th Memorial Manuel Galera

=== Grand Tour general classification results timeline ===
Grand Tour	1994	1995	1996	1997	1998	1999	2000	2001	2002	2003
Giro d'Italia	–	119	98	–	–	39	–	–	59	–
Tour de France	–	–	–	–	–	47	–	118	–	–
Vuelta a España	84	53	39	32	DNF	–	55	–	–	96
