= Ibon Ajuria =

Spanish cyclist (born 1971)

Personal information
- Full name: Ibon Ajuria Gordón
- Born: 9 August 1971 (age 55) Izurtza, Spain

Cycling career
- Sport: Cycling
- Current team: Retired
- Discipline: Road
- Role: Rider

Professional team
- 1994–1999: Euskadi–Petronor

Ibon Ajuria Gordón (born 9 August 1971) is a Spanish former professional racing cyclist.

He rode in the 1997 Vuelta a España, finishing 27th overall. He also finished 6th overall in the 1996 Tour de l'Avenir.
