= 2001 Vuelta a Castilla y León =

Race details
- Dates: 5–9 August 2001
- Stages: 5
- Distance: 709.7 km (441.0 mi)
- Winning time: 18h 13' 11"

Results
| | Winner | Marcos-Antonio Serrano (ESP) |
| | Second | ~~Levi Leipheimer~~ (USA) |
| | Third | Manuel Beltrán (ESP) |

The 2001 Vuelta a Castilla y León was the 16th edition of the Vuelta a Castilla y León cycle race and was held on 5 August to 9 August 2001. The race started in Segovia and finished at the Alto de Redondal. The race was won by Marcos-Antonio Serrano.

== Teams ==
Seventeen teams of up to eight riders started the race:

- iBanesto.com
- Team Telekom
- ONCE–Eroski
- Mercatone Uno–Stream TV
- Kelme–Costa Blanca
- Mapei–Quick-Step
- Euskaltel–Euskadi
- U.S. Postal Service
- Colchon Relax–Fuenlabrada
- Rabobank
- Jazztel–Costa de Almería
- Team Coast–Buffalo
- Collstrop–Palmans
- Alessio
- Nürnberger
- Team Fakta
- Bankgiroloterij–Batavus

== General classification ==
Final general classification

| Rank | Rider | Time |
|---|---|---|
| 1 | Marcos-Antonio Serrano (ESP) | 18h 13' 11" |
| ~~2~~ | ~~Levi Leipheimer (USA)~~ | ~~+ 1' 04"~~ |
| 3 | Manuel Beltrán (ESP) | + 1' 10" |
| 4 | José María Jiménez (ESP) | s.t. |
| 5 | Juan Antonio Flecha (ESP) | + 1' 13" |
| 6 | Alberto López de Munain (ESP) | + 1' 50" |
| 7 | Paolo Lanfranchi (ITA) | + 1' 58" |
| 8 | Cristian Moreni (ITA) | + 2' 13" |
| 9 | Gerhard Trampusch (AUT) | + 2' 22" |
| 10 | Mauro Zanetti (ITA) | + 2' 52" |
