= Claudio Camin =

Italian cyclist

Personal information
- Born: 4 March 1970 (age 56) Bolzano, Italy

Cycling career
- Sport: Cycling
- Current team: Retired
- Discipline: Road
- Role: Rider

Amateur teams
- 1990: Caneva Record Cucine
- 1993: Caneva Record Cucine
- 1994–1995: Zalf Euromobil Fior

Professional teams
- 1996–1998: Brescialat
- 1999: Vini Caldirola

Claudio Camin (born 4 March 1970) is an Italian former racing cyclist. He rode in the 1996 Tour de France and the 1997 Vuelta a España.

== Major results ==
1987
2nd Trofeo Guido Dorigo
1990
2nd Trofeo Papà Cervi
1991
1st Circuito del Porto
1994
3rd Trofeo Zsšdi
1995
1st Stage 4 Girobio
3rd Gran Premio della Liberazione
1996
3rd GP Citta di Rio Saliceto e Correggio
1997
4th Paris–Tours
7th Overall Giro di Puglia
