= 1997 Vuelta a España =

52nd edition of the Vuelta a España

Race details
- Dates: 6–28 September
- Stages: 22
- Distance: 3,773 km (2,344 mi)
- Winning time: 91h 15' 55"

Results
Jersey awarded to the overall winner	Winner	Alex Zülle (SUI)	(ONCE)
	Second	Fernando Escartín (ESP)	(Kelme–Costa Blanca)
	Third	Laurent Dufaux (SUI)	(Festina–Lotus)
Jersey awarded to the points classification winner	Points	Laurent Jalabert (FRA)	(ONCE)
Jersey awarded to the mountains classification winner	Mountains	José María Jiménez (ESP)	(Banesto)
Jersey awarded to the sprints classification winner	Sprints	Mauro Radaelli (ITA)	(Brescialat–Oyster)
	Team	Kelme–Costa Blanca	

The 52nd edition of the Vuelta a España (Tour of Spain), a long-distance bicycle stage race and one of the three grand tours, was held from 6 September to 28 September 1997. It consisted of 22 stages covering a total of 3,773 km (2,344 mi), and was won by Alex Zülle of the ONCE cycling team.

== Route ==
List of stages
Stage	Date	Course	Distance	Type	Winner
1	6 September	Lisbon to Estoril	155 km (96 mi)		Lars Michaelsen (DEN)
2	7 September	Évora to Vilamoura	225 km (140 mi)		Marcel Wüst (GER)
3	8 September	Loulé to Huelva	173 km (107 mi)		Marcel Wüst (GER)
4	9 September	Huelva to Jerez de la Frontera	192 km (119 mi)		Eleuterio Anguita (ESP)
5	10 September	Jerez de la Frontera to Málaga	230 km (143 mi)		Marcel Wüst (GER)
6	11 September	Málaga to Granada	147 km (91 mi)	Mountain stage	Laurent Jalabert (FRA)
7	12 September	Guadix to Sierra Nevada	219 km (136 mi)	Mountain stage	Yvon Ledanois (FRA)
8	13 September	Granada to Córdoba	176 km (109 mi)		Bart Voskamp (NED)
9	14 September	Córdoba	35 km (22 mi)	Individual time trial	Melcior Mauri (ESP)
10	15 September	Córdoba to Almendralejo	224 km (139 mi)		Mariano Piccoli (ITA)
11	16 September	Almendralejo to Plasencia	194 km (121 mi)		Ján Svorada (CZE)
12	17 September	León to Alto del Morredero	147 km (91 mi)	Mountain stage	Roberto Heras (ESP)
13	18 September	Ponferrada to Estación Valgrande-Pajares	196 km (122 mi)	Mountain stage	Pavel Tonkov (RUS)
14	19 September	Oviedo to Alto del Naranco	169 km (105 mi)	Mountain stage	José Vicente García Acosta (ESP)
15	20 September	Oviedo to Lagos de Covadonga	160 km (99 mi)	Mountain stage	Pavel Tonkov (RUS)
16	21 September	Cangas de Onís to Santander	170 km (106 mi)		Ján Svorada (CZE)
17	22 September	Santander to Burgos	183 km (114 mi)		Ján Svorada (CZE)
18	23 September	Burgos to Valladolid	184 km (114 mi)		Léon van Bon (NED)
19	24 September	Valladolid to Los Ángeles de San Rafael	193 km (120 mi)	Mountain stage	José María Jiménez (ESP)
20	25 September	Los Ángeles de San Rafael to Ávila	199 km (124 mi)	Mountain stage	Laurent Jalabert (FRA)
21	26 September	Alcobendas	43 km (27 mi)	Individual time trial	Alex Zülle (SUI)
22	27 September	Madrid	154 km (96 mi)		Max van Heeswijk (NED)
	Total		3,773 km (2,344 mi)		

== Final General Classification Standings ==
Rank	Rider	Team	Time
1	(Switzerland) Alex Zülle	ONCE	91h 15' 55s
2	(Spain) Fernando Escartín	Kelme–Costa Blanca	+ 5' 07s
3	(Switzerland) Laurent Dufaux	Festina–Lotus	+ 6' 11s
4	(Italy) Enrico Zaina	Asics–CGA	+ 7' 24s
5	(Spain) Roberto Heras	Kelme–Costa Blanca	+ 8' 04s
6	(Spain) Daniel Clavero	Estepona–Toscaf	+ 10' 02s
7	(France) Laurent Jalabert	ONCE	+ 10' 03s
8	(Spain) Marcos Serrano	Kelme–Costa Blanca	+ 10' 40s
9	(Italy) Gianni Faresin	Mapei–GB	+ 13' 53s
10	(France) Yvon Ledanois	GAN	+ 15' 40s
11	(Italy) Claudio Chiappucci	Asics–CGA	
12	(France) Philippe Bordenave	Casino	
13	(Spain) Felix Garcia	Festina–Lotus	
14	(Spain) José Ramón Uriarte	Banesto	
15	(Colombia) Carlos Alberto Contreras	Kelme–Costa Blanca	
16	(Italy) Marco Serpellini	Brescialat–Oyster	
17	(Italy) Paolo Lanfranchi	Mapei–GB	
18	(Spain) Juan Carlos Domínguez Domínguez	Kelme–Costa Blanca	
19	(France) Laurent Brochard	Festina–Lotus	
20	(Italy) Rodolfo Massi	Festina–Lotus	
21	(Spain) José María Jiménez	Banesto	
22	(Spain) Melcior Mauri	ONCE	
23	(France) Francisque Teyssier	GAN	
24	(Russia) Sergei Ivanov	TVM–Farm Frites	
25	(Switzerland) Fabian Jeker	Festina–Lotus	
