= Cristian Moreni =

Italian cyclist (born 1972)

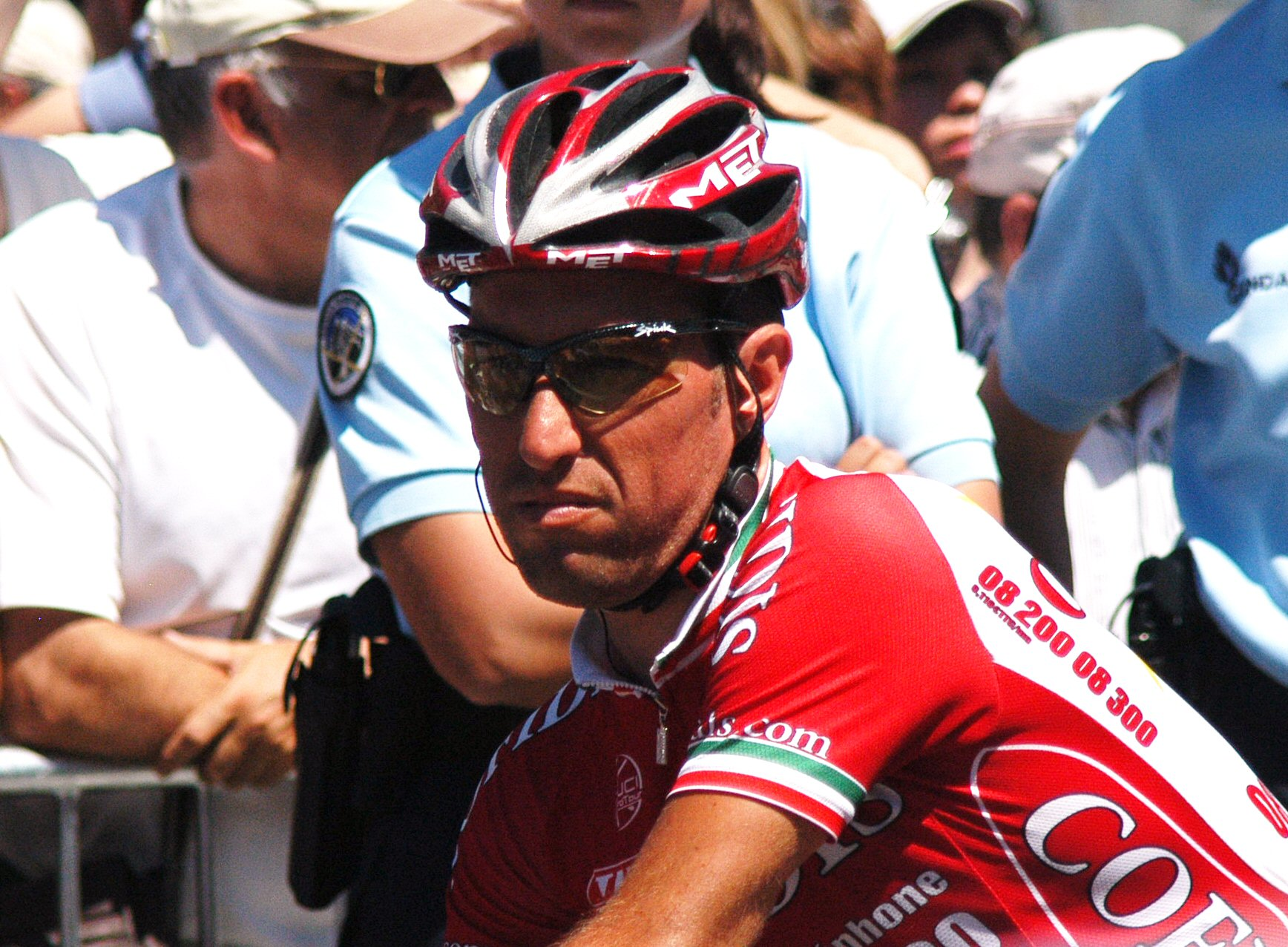
- Moreni at the 2007 Tour de France

Personal information
- Full name: Cristian Moreni
- Born: 21 November 1972 (age 53) Asola, Italy
- Height: 1.75 m (5 ft 9 in)
- Weight: 65 kg (143 lb)

Cycling career
- Sport: Cycling
- Discipline: Road
- Role: Rider

Professional teams
- 1998–2000: Brescialat–Liquigas
- 2001: Mercatone Uno–Stream TV
- 2002–2004: Alessio
- 2005: Quick-Step–Innergetic
- 2006–2007: Cofidis

Major wins
- Grand Tours Giro d'Italia 1 individual stage (2000 Vuelta a España 1 individual stage (1999) Single-day races and Classics National Road Race Championships (2004)

Cristian Moreni (born 21 November 1972 in Asola) is an Italian former road racing cyclist who competed as a professional from 1998 to 2007. He took eight wins in his career, including stages of the Giro d'Italia and Vuelta a España, the Italian National Road Race Championships and the Giro del Veneto. he also competed in the road race at the 2004 Summer Olympics.

== Doping ==
Moreni tested positive for testosterone at the end of the 11th stage of the 2007 Tour de France, on 25 July 2007 (stage 16). He was arrested after stage 16 by French gendarmes. He pleaded guilty, and did not request that a second sample be tested. Subsequently, to his arrest, Cofidis withdrew from the Tour. Moreni was suspended for two years following the scandal.

In 2009, when his suspension ended, Moreni became the first cyclist to pay a fine of one year's salary to the UCI. Moreni wanted to return as a professional cyclist.

== Major results ==
1994
4th Gran Premio della Liberazione
1996
1st Stage 9 Vuelta al Táchira
4th Gran Premio della Liberazione
1999 (1)
1st Stage 17 Vuelta a España
3rd GP de la Ville de Rennes
7th GP Industria Artigianato e Commercio Carnaghese
2000 (1)
1st Stage 2 Giro d'Italia
2001 (1)
1st Stage 2 Vuelta a Castilla y León
6th Züri-Metzgete
6th Tre Valli Varesine
2002
5th Omloop van de Vlaamse Scheldeboorden
7th HEW Cyclassics
7th Brabantse Pijl
2003 (2)
1st Giro del Veneto
2nd Coppa Agostoni
3rd Overall Regio-Tour

1st Stage 1

7th La Flèche Wallonne
2004 (2)
1st Road race, National Road Championships
1st Stage 1 Route du Sud
3rd Gran Premio Fred Mengoni
2005 (1)
3rd Japan Cup
7th GP Ouest-France
9th Gran Premio Bruno Beghelli
10th Overall Tour de l'Ain

1st Stage 1

2006
4th Giro di Lombardia
6th Züri-Metzgete
6th GP Miguel Induráin
7th Overall Tour de Pologne
8th Giro del Piemonte
2007
6th Milano–Torino

=== Tour de France participations ===
- 2002 - 66th overall
- 2006 - 44th overall; 8th points; 2nd, Stage 18
- 2007 - Disqualified, use of Testosterone

== See also ==
- List of doping cases in cycling
- List of sportspeople sanctioned for doping offences
