= Lars Michaelsen =

Danish cyclist (born 1969)

Personal information
- Full name: Lars Michaelsen
- Born: 13 March 1969 (age 57) Copenhagen, Denmark
- Height: 1.85 m (6 ft 1 in)
- Weight: 79 kg (174 lb; 12.4 st)

Cycling career
- Sport: Cycling
- Discipline: Road
- Role: Rider

Professional teams
- 1994: Catavana–AS Corbeil–Essonnes–Cedico
- 1995–1996: Festina
- 1997–1998: TVM
- 1999–2000: Française des Jeux
- 2001–2002: Team Coast
- 2003–2007: Team CSC

Managerial teams
- 2008–2010: Team CSC
- 2011: Leopard Trek
- 2012–2016: Saxo Bank–Tinkoff Bank
- 2017–: Astana

Major wins
- Grand Tours Vuelta a España 1 individual stage (1997) Stage races Tour of Qatar (2005) One-day races and Classics Gent–Wevelgem (1995)

Lars Michaelsen (born 13 March 1969) is a Danish former professional road bicycle racer who last rode for Team CSC. He got his break through in his second year as a professional, when he won the 1995 edition of Gent–Wevelgem. In the 1997 Vuelta a España he won stage 1 and wore the leader's jersey for three days (stage 2, 3 and 5). In 2002 he finished fifth in Paris–Roubaix, a result he would duplicate in 2005. In the 2006 Paris–Roubaix he was once again in the group of favourites, but he helped teammate Fabian Cancellara win the race and finished 19th himself. In his last race, the 2007 Paris–Roubaix, he finished 11th after a strong race, where only a mechanical failure prevented him from following the favorites. Again a teammate, Stuart O'Grady, won the race. Michaelsen rode at four Olympic Games.

After retiring he became a directeur sportif, continuing with his final team until 2011 when he joined Leopard Trek. He subsequently returned to Team Saxo Bank in 2013. Following the end of the then-Tinkoff team in 2016, he joined the Astana Proteam in 2017.

At the 2018 Tour de Yorkshire, Michaelsen was driving the Astana team car when it crashed through a traffic island manned by a race volunteer. Consequently, he was given a period of suspension of 50 days and a fine of CHF 5,000 by the UCI.

== Major results ==
1994
Paris–Bourges
Grand Prix Denain
1995
Gent–Wevelgem
1997
Stage 1, Vuelta a España
Stage 1, Vuelta a Burgos
1999
Stage 1 and Stage 5, Trans Canada
116th, 1999 Tour de France
2000
Stage 2, Danmark Rundt
Grand Prix Van Steenbergen
2003
Stage 2, Four Days of Dunkirk
Stage 2, Hessen Rundfahrt
2004
1st Clarendon Cup
2005
1st Overall, Tour of Qatar

1st Stage 3

2006
Stage 1, Tour de Georgia
