= Gianluca Gorini =

Italian cyclist

Personal information
- Born: 18 October 1970 (age 55) Gorizia, Italy

Cycling career
- Sport: Cycling
- Role: Rider

Gianluca Gorini (born 18 October 1970) is an Italian former professional racing cyclist. He rode in the 1995 Tour de France.
