= Philippe Bordenave =

French cyclist

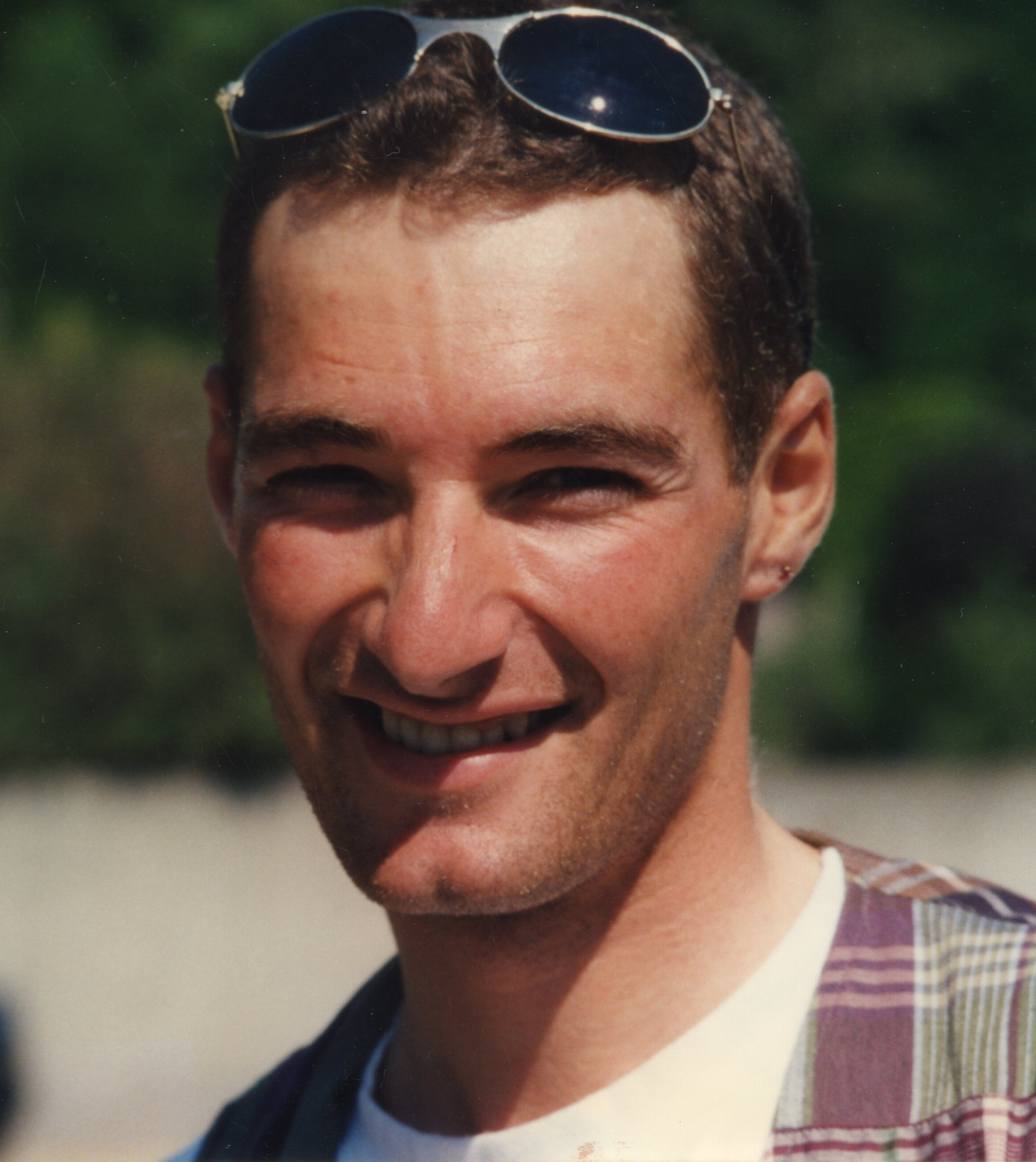
- Philippe Bordenave in 1996

Personal information
- Born: 4 March 1969 (age 57) Orthez, France

Cycling career
- Sport: Cycling
- Current team: Retired
- Discipline: Road
- Role: Rider

Professional teams
- 1996–1997: Casino
- 1998–1999: BigMat–Auber 93
- 2000–2001: Ag2r Prévoyance

Philippe Bordenave (born 4 March 1969) is a French former professional cyclist.

== Career achievements ==
=== Major results ===
1997
1st stage 7 Tour de l'Ain
1998
1st stage 4 Tour du Limousin

=== Grand Tour general classification results timeline ===
Grand Tour	1997	1998
Giro d'Italia	—	—
Tour de France	—	30
Vuelta a España	12	—
