= Julio César Ortegon =

Colombian cyclist

Personal information
- Born: 1 December 1968 (age 57)

Cycling career
- Sport: Cycling
- Role: Rider

Julio César Ortegon (born 1 December 1968) is a Colombian racing cyclist. He rode in the 1992 Tour de France.
