= Eleuterio Anguita =

Spanish cyclist (born 1969)

Personal information
- Born: 31 March 1969 (age 57) Madrid, Spain

Cycling career
- Sport: Cycling
- Current team: Retired
- Discipline: Road
- Role: Rider

Professional teams
- 1991–1992: Seur
- 1993–1994: Deportpublic
- 1995: Castellblanch
- 1996: MX Onda
- 1997–1998: Estepona en Marcha
- 1999: Fuenlabrada
- 2000–2002: Jazztel – Costa de Almería

Eleuterio Anguita Hinojosa (born 31 March 1969 in Madrid) is a former Spanish cyclist. He rode in 10 editions of the Vuelta a España and 2 editions of the Giro d'Italia.

In September 2026, Anguita was working as the Spanish junior men's team's road director at the 2026 UCI Road World Championships. It was reported that that the team car he was driving hit a pedestrian crossing and briefly lifted into the air; he was fined 1000 CHF and excluded from the championship.

== Palmares ==
1991
1st Stage 4 Troféu Joaquim Agostinho
1993
1st Stage 4 Vuelta a Galicia
1995
1st Stage 7 Volta ao Alentejo
1997
1st Stage 4 Vuelta a España
1998
1st Stage 2 Vuelta a Burgos
2nd Clásica a los Puertos de Guadarrama
2001
2nd Clásica de Sabiñánigo
9th Clásica de Almería
