= Marcos Serrano =

Spanish cyclist

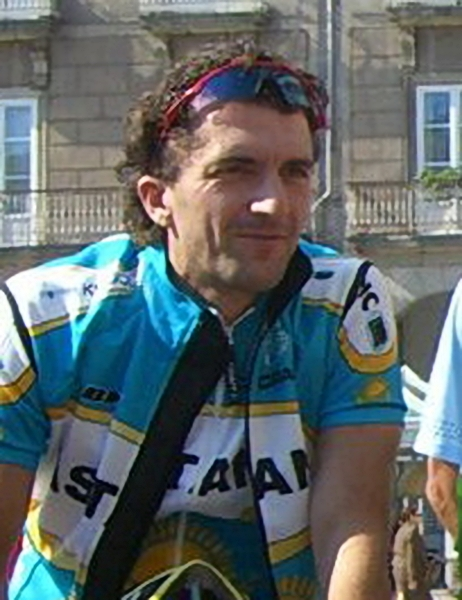
- Serrano at the 2005 Tour de France

Personal information
- Full name: Marcos Antonio Serrano Rodríguez
- Born: 8 September 1972 (age 54) Redondela, Province of Pontevedra, Spain
- Height: 1.74 m (5 ft 9 in)
- Weight: 63 kg (139 lb)

Cycling career
- Sport: Cycling
- Current team: Retired
- Discipline: Road
- Role: Rider
- Rider type: Climber/Breakaway specialist

Professional teams
- 1994–1998: Kelme–Avianca–Gios
- 1999–2006: ONCE–Deutsche Bank
- 2007: Karpin–Galicia

Major wins
- Grand Tours Tour de France 1 individual stage (2005) Vuelta a España 1 TTT stage (2003) One-day races and Classics Milano–Torino (2004)

Marcos Antonio Serrano Rodríguez (born 8 September 1972) is a former professional cyclist from Galicia, Spain. Turning professional in 1994, he joined the Kelme–Xacobeo team and then in 1999 the lottery-sponsored ONCE–Deutsche Bank. He remained part of the same team when in 2004 sponsorship and name passed to Liberty Seguros-Würth and in 2006, as the Astana-Würth Team.

His most notable wins were the 2004 Milano–Torino and the 18th stage of the 2005 Tour de France. His best overall classification in the Tour de France was a ninth-place finish in 2001.

His name was on the list of doping tests published by the French Senate on 24 July 2013 that were collected during the 1998 Tour de France and found positive for EPO when retested in 2004.

== Major results ==
1989
1st Overall Vuelta al Besaya
1995
2nd Clásica a los Puertos de Guadarrama
5th Subida al Naranco
9th Overall Vuelta a los Valles Mineros
1996
3rd Subida al Naranco
7th Overall Vuelta a Asturias
10th Overall Escalada a Montjuich
1997
3rd Overall Vuelta a La Rioja
4th Road race, National Road Championships
8th Overall Giro d'Italia
8th Overall Vuelta a España
1998 (1 pro win)
1st Clásica a los Puertos de Guadarrama
3rd Overall Tour of Galicia
10th Overall Vuelta a España
1999 (2)
1st Overall Tour of Galicia

1st Stage 5

2000
1st Stage 1 (TTT) Volta a Catalunya
2001 (1)
1st Overall Vuelta a Castilla y León
1st Stage 1 (TTT) Volta a Catalunya
3rd Overall Tour of the Basque Country
6th Overall Setmana Catalana de Ciclisme
7th Liège–Bastogne–Liège
9th Overall Tour de France
2002
1st Stage 4 (TTT) Tour de France
2nd GP Miguel Induráin
4th Overall Euskal Bizikleta
5th Overall Grand Prix du Midi Libre
2003 (1)
1st Stage 1 (TTT) Vuelta a España
2nd Clásica a los Puertos de Guadarrama
9th Overall Setmana Catalana de Ciclisme
2004 (1)
1st Milano–Torino
4th Overall Vuelta a Burgos
4th Subida a Urkiola
4th Clásica de San Sebastián
8th La Flèche Wallonne
2005
1st Stage 18 Tour de France
7th Overall Escalada a Montjuich
2007
6th Subida al Naranco
8th Overall Volta a Catalunya

=== Grand Tour general classification results timeline ===
Grand Tour	1994	1995	1996	1997	1998	1999	2000	2001	2002	2003	2004	2005	2006
Giro d'Italia	—	—	—	8	—	—	—	—	—	—	—	—	DNF
Tour de France	—	—	—	—	DNF	25	DNF	9	33	68	54	40	—
Vuelta a España	41	11	11	8	10	34	DNF	—	38	14	12	19	—

Legend
—	Did not compete
DNF	Did not finish
