= Daniel Clavero =

Spanish cyclist (born 1968)

Personal information
- Born: 9 August 1968 (age 58) Madrid, Spain

Cycling career
- Sport: Cycling
- Current team: Retired
- Discipline: Road
- Role: Rider

Professional teams
- 1992–1995: Artiach–Royal
- 1996–1997: MX Onda
- 1998–1999: Vitalicio Seguros
- 2000: Team Polti
- 2001–2003: Mercatone Uno–Stream TV

Daniel Clavero (born 9 August 1968) is a Spanish former professional racing cyclist. He rode in seven editions of the Giro d'Italia and six editions of the Vuelta a España.

== Major results ==
1995
8th Overall Vuelta a España
1996
3rd Escalada a Montjuïc
1997
2nd Overall GP Jornal de Noticias

1st Stage 5

3rd Overall Euskal Bizikleta
3rd Subida al Naranco
3rd Escalada a Montjuïc
4th Overall Volta a Catalunya
6th Overall Vuelta a España
1998
2nd Overall Vuelta a Aragón
3rd Klasika Primavera
5th Overall Giro d'Italia
1999
9th Overall Giro d'Italia

=== Grand Tour general classification results timeline ===
Grand Tour	1993	1994	1995	1996	1997	1998	1999	2000	2001	2002	2003
Vuelta a España	—	—	8	14	6	DNF	—	68	46	DNF	43
Giro d'Italia	DNF	—	—	—	—	5	9	DNF	26	—	—
Tour de France	Did not contest during his career										

Legend
DSQ	Disqualified
DNF	Did not finish
