= Ján Svorada =

Czech cyclist

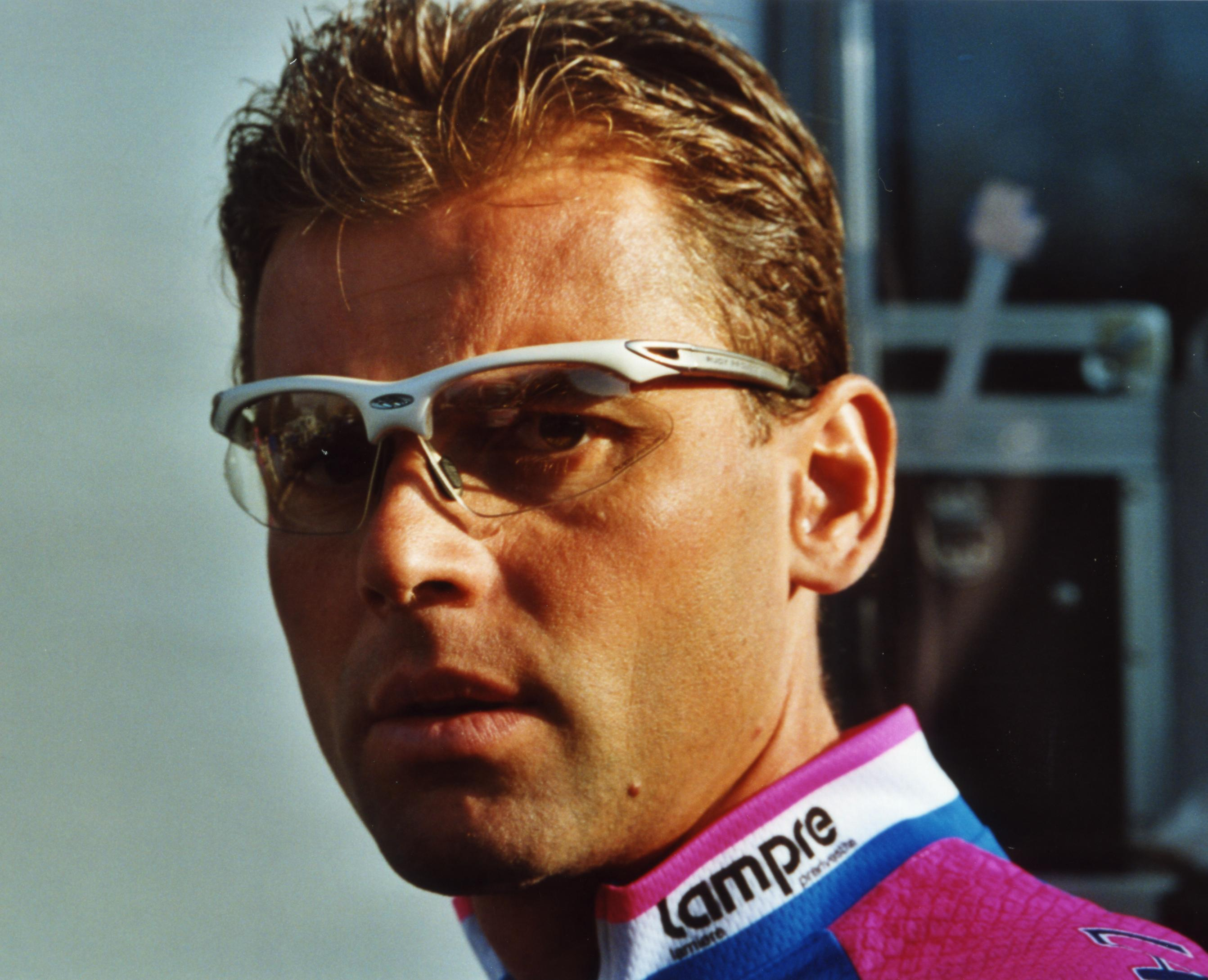

Personal information
- Born: 28 August 1968 (age 58) Trenčín, Czechoslovakia

Cycling career
- Sport: Cycling
- Current team: Retired
- Discipline: Road
- Role: Rider
- Rider type: Sprinter

Professional teams
- 1991–1995: Lampre
- 1996: Ceramiche Panaria
- 1997–1998: Mapei
- 1999–2004: Lampre-Daikin
- 2005: Ed' System ZVVZ

Major wins
- Grand Tours Tour de France 3 individual stages (1994, 1998, 2001) Giro d'Italia 5 individual stages (1994, 1995, 2000) Vuelta a España 3 individual stages (1997)

Ján Svorada (born 28 August 1968) is a Slovak and Czech retired road racing cyclist.

He was born in Czechoslovakia; when that country split up in 1993, he raced for Slovakia until 1996, when he started racing for the Czech Republic.

When Svorada won Stage 2 of the 1998 Tour de France he became a rarity in professional cycling because at that point he became a Tour de France stage winner who won at least one stage with two different nationalities. His first stage win at the Tour de France (Stage 7 in 1994) was obtained as a Slovak cyclist, and later he won also a stage in 1998 as a Czech rider.

He competed for the Czech Republic at the 1996 Summer Olympics, the 2000 Summer Olympics, and the 2004 Summer Olympics.

== Major results ==
1988
1st Stage 5 Olympia's Tour
1990
1st Overall Peace Race

1st Active rider classification
1st Sprints classification
1st Combination classification
1st Stages 1, 2 & 9b

1st Stage 2 GP Tell
1992
1st Stage 1 Tour de Romandie
2nd Overall GP du Midi-Libre

1st Stage 1

1993
1st Intergiro classification Giro d'Italia
7th Overall KBC Driedaagse van De Panne-Koksijde
1994
1st Overall GP du Midi-Libre
Giro d'Italia

1st Stages 9, 11 & 17

1st Stage 5a Vuelta a Andalucía
1st Stage 4 Tour de Romandie
1st Stage 7 Tour de France
1st Stage 5 Tour of Britain
1995
1st Stage 8 Tirreno–Adriatico
1st Stage 12 Giro d'Italia
1996
1st Overall Étoile de Bessèges

1st Stages 4 & 5

1st Road race, National Road Championships
1st Stage 1 Giro di Sardegna
1st Stage 2 Tour de Suisse
1st Grand Prix de Denain
2nd Grand Prix d'Ouverture La Marseillaise
4th Overall Tour Méditerranéen

1st Stage 1

4th Scheldeprijs
Tirreno–Adriatico

1st Stages 5a & 8

1997
Vuelta a España

1st Stages 11, 16 & 17

Volta a Catalunya

1st Stages 1a, 2 & 4

Tour of Galicia

1st Stages 1 & 3a

1st Stage 4 Giro di Sardegna
1st Stage 3 Volta a Portugal
3rd Grand Prix d'Ouverture La Marseillaise
5th Paris–Tours
7th Overall Étoile de Bessèges

1st Stages 2, 3 & 5

7th CoreStates Classic
1998
1st Road race, National Road Championships
1st Stage 3 Tirreno–Adriatico
1st Stage 4 4 Jours de Dunkerque
1st Stage 2 Tour de France
1st First Union Classic
1st Memorial Rik Van Steenbergen
3rd Giro della Provincia di Siracusa
Volta a Portugal

1st Stages 1 & 3

1999
1st Stage 3 Vuelta a Murcia
1st Stage 8 Tirreno–Adriatico
1st Clásica de Almería
2000
1st Stage 2 Tirreno–Adriatico
1st Stage 1a Giro del Trentino
1st Stage 3 Giro d'Italia
2nd Clásica de Almería
2001
1st Stage 3 4 Jours de Dunkerque
1st Stage 2 GP du Midi-Libre
1st Stage 20 Tour de France (Champs-Élysées)
1st Profronde van Pijnacker
3rd Overall Étoile de Bessèges
2002
Tour of Belgium

1st Stages 1 & 4

1st Stage 1 Vuelta a Murcia
1st Wiener Radfest
1st Linz
6th Scheldeprijs
8th Milan–San Remo
2003
1st Stage 1 International Tour of Rhodes
1st Stage 1 Vuelta a Murcia
1st Stage 1 Settimana Internazionale Coppi e Bartali
3rd Overall Tour of Qatar
8th Milan–San Remo
2004
1st Stage 4 Giro del Trentino
1st Stage 1 Tour de Romandie
1st Rokycany
7th Grand Prix d'Ouverture La Marseillaise
2005
1st Road race, National Road Championships
1st Stage 1 Bayern Rundfahrt
1st Stage 3 Rothaus Regio-Tour
3rd Stausee Rundfahrt
2006
5th Road race, National Road Championships
6th GP Hydraulika Mikolasek
