= Aart Vierhouten =

Dutch cyclist (born 1970)

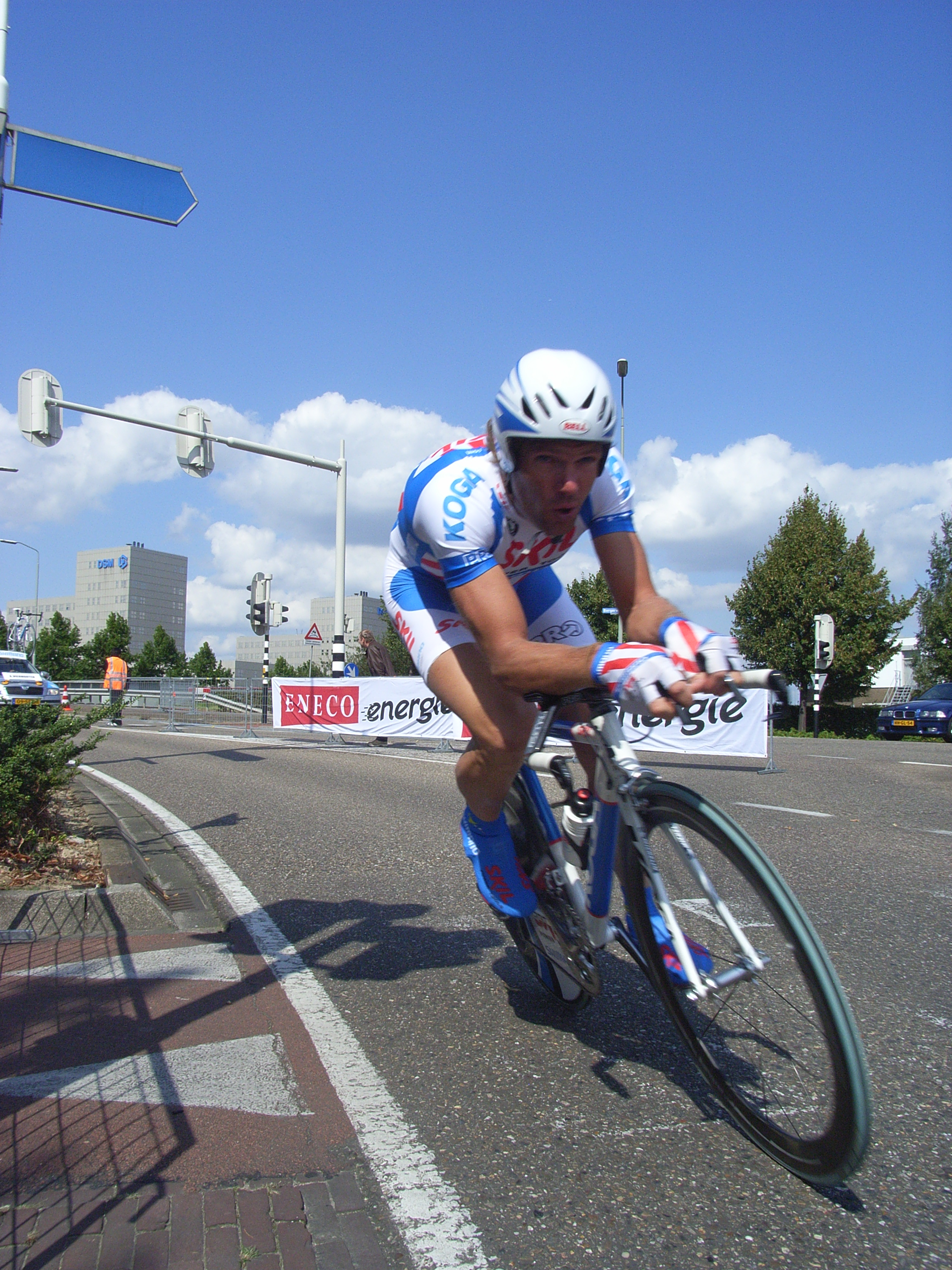

Personal information
- Born: 19 March 1970 (age 56) Ermelo, the Netherlands

Cycling career
- Sport: Cycling
- Disciplines: Road and track
- Role: Rider

Professional teams
- 1996–2001: Rabobank
- 2002–2005: Lotto–Adecco
- 2006–2007: Skil–Shimano
- 2008: P3 Transfer-Batavus
- 2009: Vacansoleil

Aart Vierhouten (born 19 March 1970 in Ermelo, Gelderland) is a Dutch former professional racing cyclist, who last rode for Vacansoleil. He competed in the men's individual road race at the 1996 Summer Olympics.

More recently, Vierhouten has become a team leader at Team Bahrain Victorious.

== Major results ==
1993
1st, Overall, Tour de Liège
1st, Drielandenomloop
1st, Internatie Reningelst
1st, Stage 2, Tour du Hainaut (amateurs)
1994
1st, Stages 1 & 9, Tour de Wallonie
1996
1st, Rund um Rhede
1st, Stage 7, Teleflex Tour
1997
1st, Stage 2, Rheinland-Pfalz Rundfahrt
8th, Paris–Tours
15th, World Road Race Championship
1998
1st, Aalsmeer
1999
10th, Paris–Tours
2000
1st, Groningen - Münster
2003
3rd, National Derny Championship
2004
1st, Profronde van Maastricht
3rd, Stage 20, Giro d'Italia
2006
1st, Stage 1, Ster Elektrotoer
1st, Profronde van Fryslan
3rd, E3 Prijs Vlaanderen
3rd, Madison, 2006 Dutch National Track Championships (together with Kenny van Hummel)
2007
1st, Zandvoort
2008
1st, Ronde van Zuid-Friesland

== See also ==
- List of Dutch Olympic cyclists
