= Gianni Faresin =

Italian cyclist

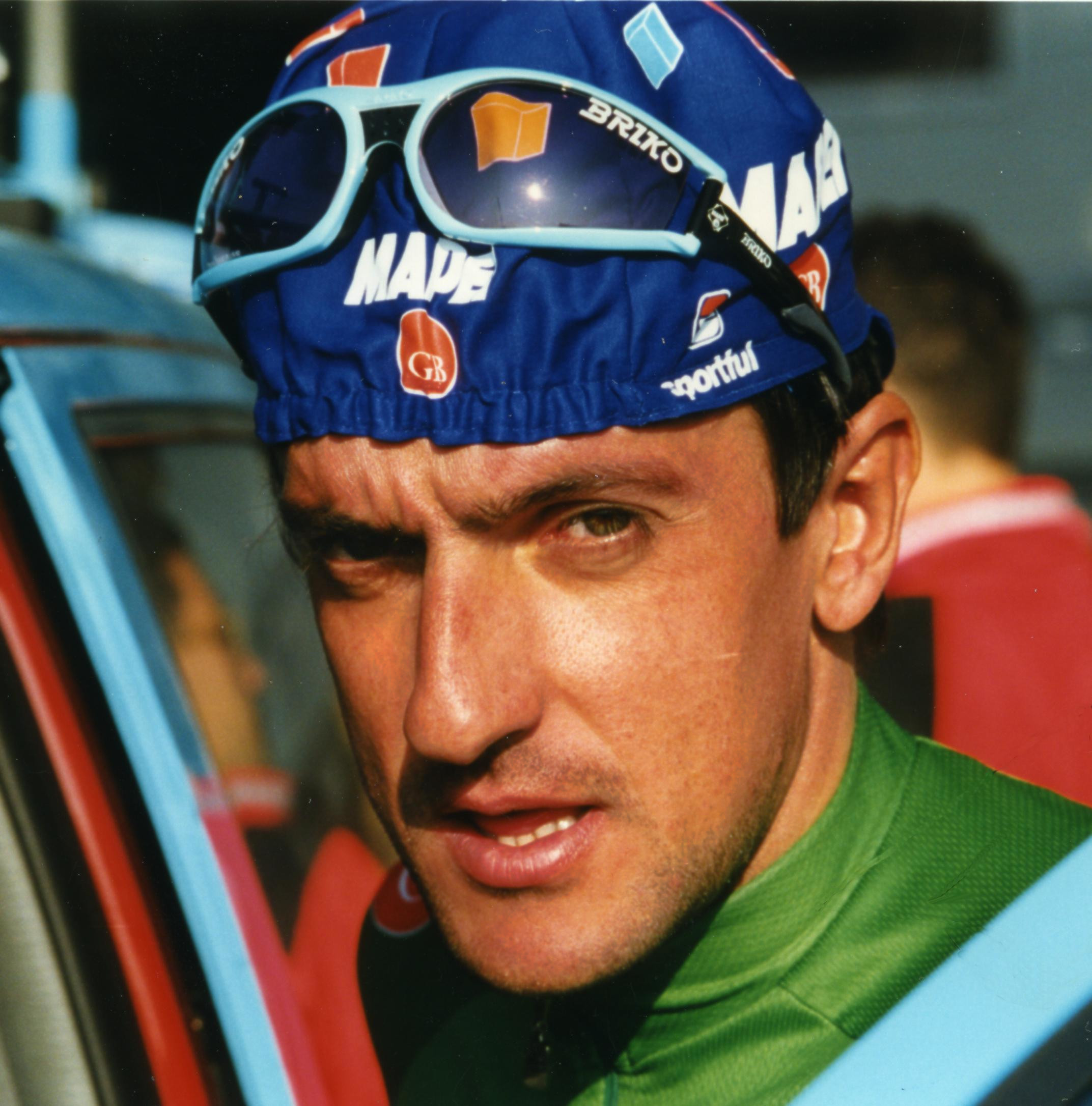
- Faresin at the 1997 Paris–Tours

Personal information
- Full name: Gianni Faresin
- Born: 16 July 1965 (age 61) Marostica, Italy

Cycling career
- Sport: Cycling
- Current team: Zalf Euromobil Fior
- Discipline: Road
- Role: Rider (retired); Directeur sportif

Professional teams
- 1988–1990: Malvor–Bottecchia–Sidi
- 1991–1993: ZG Mobili–Bottecchia
- 1994–1996: Lampre–Panaria
- 1997–2000: Mapei–GB
- 2001: Liquigas–Pata
- 2002–2004: Gerolsteiner

Managerial teams
- 2016–2019: Zalf–Euromobil–Désirée–Fior
- 2020: Casillo–Petroli Firenze–Hopplà
- 2021–: Zalf Euromobil Fior

Major wins
- Giro di Lombardia (1995)

Gianni Faresin (born 16 July 1965) is an Italian former road bicycle racer, who competed professionally from 1988 to 2004. He currently works as a directeur sportif for UCI Continental team Zalf Euromobil Fior, for whom his son Edoardo rides. Faresin was born in Marostica.

== Major results ==
1991
1st GP Industria & Artigianato di Larciano
1st Gran Premio Città di Camaiore
1992
1st GP Industria & Artigianato di Larciano
1994
1st Gran Premio Città Di Cordignano
1st Stage 3 Giro del Trentino
1995
1st Overall Hofbrau Cup

1st Stage 3

1st Giro di Lombardia
1996
1st Stage 3 Giro del Trentino
1997
1st Road race, National Road Championships
1st GP Industria & Artigianato di Larciano
2000
1st Intermediate Sprints Classification 2000 Vuelta a España
1st LUK-Cup Bühl
2001
1st Trofeo Matteotti
