= Yvon Ledanois =

French cyclist

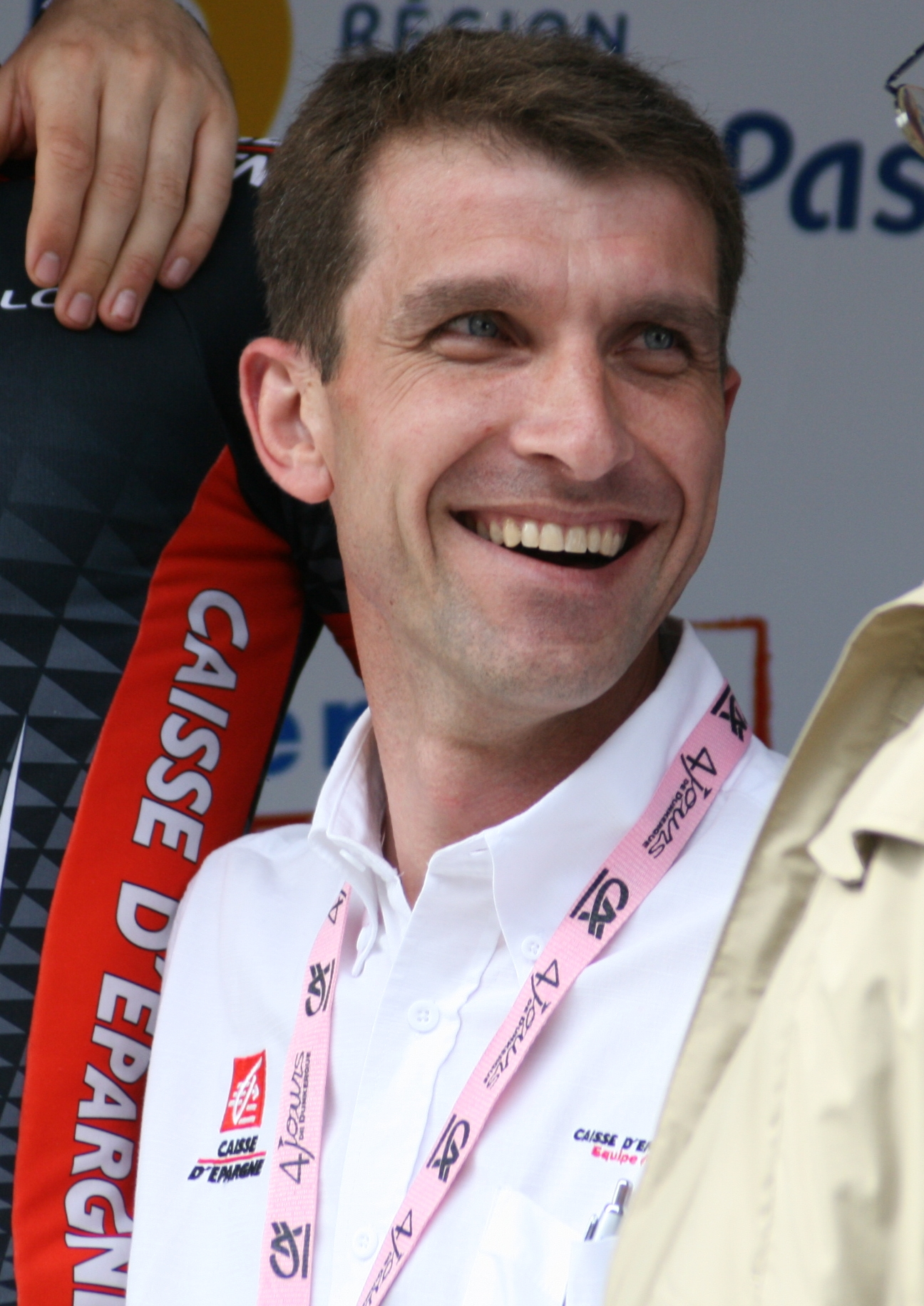

Personal information
- Born: 5 July 1969 (age 57) Montreuil-sous-Bois, France

Cycling career
- Sport: Cycling
- Current team: Arkéa–B&B Hotels
- Discipline: Road
- Role: Rider, sports director

Professional teams
- 1989: Super U–Raleigh–Fiat
- 1990–1992: Castorama
- 1993–1994: WordPerfect–Colnago–Decca
- 1995–1997: GAN
- 1998–2001: Française des Jeux

Managerial teams
- 2008–2012: Caisse d'Epargne
- 2013–2017: BMC Racing Team
- 2018–: Fortuneo–Samsic

Major wins
- 1 stage Vuelta a España (1997)

Yvon Ledanois (born 5 July 1969 in Montreuil-sous-Bois) is a French former professional road cyclist. After retiring from racing he embarked on a career in team management, joining Caisse d'Epargne as a directeur sportif in 2008 and staying there for five seasons before joining the BMC Racing Team. He subsequently took up a DS role at Fortuneo–Samsic ahead of the 2018 season. He is the father of fellow racing cyclist Kévin Ledanois.

== Major results ==
1989
3rd Overall Ronde de l'Isard
1990
1st Châteauroux–Limoges
10th GP de Denain
1992
8th Overall Tour de l'Oise
1993
6th Overall Tour de l'Avenir
8th Overall Tour Méditerranéen
1994
4th GP du canton d'Argovie
8th Tour de Berne
10th Overall Tour de l'Oise
1995
4th Tour du Haut Var
5th Trofeo Laigueglia
9th Overall Paris–Nice
9th Overall Étoile de Bessèges
1997
3rd Overall Tour de l'Ain

1st Stage 2

6th Grand Prix d'Ouverture La Marseillaise
9th Züri-Metzgete
10th Overall Vuelta a España

1st Stage 7

1999
8th Route Adélie
2000
4th Paris–Camembert
6th GP du canton d'Argovie

=== Grand Tour general classification results timeline ===
Grand Tour	1992	1993	1994	1995	1996	1997	1998	1999	2000
Vuelta a España	—	—	—	—	—	10	—	—	—
Giro d'Italia	DNF	—	—	—	—	—	—	—	DNF
Tour de France	42	DNF	—	30	—	—	—	—	—

Legend
—	Did not compete
DNF	Did not finish
