= Enrico Zaina =

Italian cyclist

Personal information
- Full name: Enrico Zaina
- Born: 27 September 1967 (age 59) Brescia, Italy

Cycling career
- Sport: Cycling
- Discipline: Road
- Role: Rider
- Rider type: Climber

Professional teams
- 1989–1991: Carrera
- 1992–1993: Mercatone Uno
- 1994: Gewiss-Ballan
- 1995–1996: Carrera
- 1997: Asics-C.G.A.
- 1998: Brescialat-Liquigas
- 1999–2000: Mercatone Uno

Major wins
- Giro d'Italia, 3 stages Vuelta a España, 1 stage

Enrico Zaina (born 27 September 1967 in Brescia) is an Italian former road bicycle racer. Zaina turned professional in 1989. He won a stage of the 1995 Giro d'Italia and two stages of the 1996 Giro d'Italia, where he finished second overall behind Pavel Tonkov. He also won a stage of the 1992 Vuelta a España.

== Major achievements ==
1992
1st, Stage 17, Vuelta a España
1993
1st, Overall, Settimana Bergamasca
1995
1st, Stage 11, Giro d'Italia
1996
2nd, Overall, Giro d'Italia

1st, Stage 9 & 20

1999
1st, Stage 3, Settimana Ciclistica Lombarda
