= 1997 Giro d'Italia, Stage 12 to Stage 22 =

Cycling race stages

The 1997 Giro d'Italia was the 80th edition of the Giro d'Italia, one of cycling's Grand Tours. The Giro began in Venice, with a flat stage on 17 May, and Stage 12 occurred on 29 May with a stage from La Spezia. The race finished in Milan on 8 June.

== Stage 12 ==
29 May 1997 — La Spezia to Varazze, 214 km (133 mi)

Stage 12 result

| Rank | Rider | Team | Time |
|---|---|---|---|
| 1 | Giuseppe Di Grande (ITA) | Mapei–GB | 5h 47' 14" |
| 2 | Marcos Serrano (ESP) | Kelme–Costa Blanca | s.t. |
| 3 | Alexandr Shefer (KAZ) | Asics–CGA | s.t. |
| 4 | Axel Merckx (BEL) | Team Polti | s.t. |
| 5 | Leonardo Piepoli (ITA) | Refin–Mobilvetta | s.t. |
| 6 | Wladimir Belli (ITA) | Brescialat–Oyster | + 12" |
| 7 | Giuseppe Guerini (ITA) | Team Polti | s.t. |
| 8 | Luc Leblanc (FRA) | Team Polti | s.t. |
| 9 | Ivan Gotti (ITA) | Saeco–Estro | s.t. |
| 10 | Pavel Tonkov (RUS) | Mapei–GB | s.t. |

General classification after Stage 12

| Rank | Rider | Team | Time |
|---|---|---|---|
| 1 | Pavel Tonkov (RUS) | Mapei–GB | 55h 22' 06" |
| 2 | Luc Leblanc (FRA) | Team Polti | + 41" |
| 3 | Ivan Gotti (ITA) | Saeco–Estro | + 1' 07" |
| 4 | Andrea Noè (ITA) | Asics–CGA | + 1' 49" |
| 5 | Leonardo Piepoli (ITA) | Refin–Mobilvetta | + 2' 37" |
| 6 | Alexandr Shefer (KAZ) | Asics–CGA | + 2' 49" |
| 7 | Paolo Savoldelli (ITA) | Roslotto–ZG Mobili | + 2' 51" |
| 8 | Giuseppe Di Grande (ITA) | Mapei–GB | + 3' 38" |
| 9 | Giuseppe Guerini (ITA) | Team Polti | + 3' 58" |

== Stage 13 ==
30 May 1997 — Varazze to Cuneo, 150 km (93 mi)

Stage 13 result

| Rank | Rider | Team | Time |
|---|---|---|---|
| 1 | Glenn Magnusson (SWE) | Amore & Vita–ForzArcore | 3h 25' 04" |
| 2 | Mirko Rossato{{main other| (ITA) | Scrigno–Gaerne | + 1" |
| 3 | Mario Cipollini (ITA) | Saeco–Estro | s.t. |
| 4 | Mario Traversoni (ITA) | Mercatone Uno | s.t. |
| 5 | Fabio Baldato (ITA) | MG Maglificio–Technogym | s.t. |
| 6 | Mariano Piccoli (ITA) | Brescialat–Oyster | s.t. |
| 7 | Nicola Loda (ITA) | MG Maglificio–Technogym | s.t. |
| 8 | Endrio Leoni (ITA) | Aki–Safi | s.t. |
| 9 | Manuele Scopsi (ITA) | Ros Mary–Minotti | s.t. |
| 10 | Enrico Cassani (ITA) | Team Polti | s.t. |

General classification after Stage 13

| Rank | Rider | Team | Time |
|---|---|---|---|
| 1 | Pavel Tonkov (RUS) | Mapei–GB | 58h 47' 11" |
| 2 | Luc Leblanc (FRA) | Team Polti | + 41" |
| 3 | Ivan Gotti (ITA) | Saeco–Estro | + 1' 07" |
| 4 | Andrea Noè (ITA) | Asics–CGA | + 1' 49" |
| 5 | Leonardo Piepoli (ITA) | Refin–Mobilvetta | + 2' 37" |
| 6 | Alexandr Shefer (KAZ) | Asics–CGA | + 2' 49" |
| 7 | Paolo Savoldelli (ITA) | Roslotto–ZG Mobili | + 2' 51" |
| 8 | Giuseppe Di Grande (ITA) | Mapei–GB | + 3' 38" |
| 9 | Giuseppe Guerini (ITA) | Team Polti | + 3' 58" |
| 10 | Nicola Miceli (ITA) | Aki–Safi | + 4' 09" |

== Stage 14 ==
31 May 1997 — Racconigi to Breuil-Cervinia, 240 km (150 mi)

Stage 14 result

| Rank | Rider | Team | Time |
|---|---|---|---|
| 1 | Ivan Gotti (ITA) | Saeco–Estro | 7h 06' 32" |
| 2 | Nicola Miceli (ITA) | Aki–Safi | + 39" |
| 3 | Stefano Garzelli (ITA) | Mercatone Uno | + 1' 20" |
| 4 | José Jaime González (COL) | Kelme–Costa Blanca | + 1' 46" |
| 5 | Pavel Tonkov (RUS) | Mapei–GB | s.t. |
| 6 | Leonardo Piepoli (ITA) | Refin–Mobilvetta | s.t. |
| 7 | Alexandr Shefer (KAZ) | Asics–CGA | s.t. |
| 8 | Axel Merckx (BEL) | Team Polti | + 1' 50" |
| 9 | Daniele De Paoli (ITA) | Ros Mary–Minotti | + 3' 12" |
| 10 | Giuseppe Guerini (ITA) | Team Polti | + 3' 14" |

General classification after Stage 14

| Rank | Rider | Team | Time |
|---|---|---|---|
| 1 | Ivan Gotti (ITA) | Saeco–Estro | 65h 54' 38" |
| 2 | Pavel Tonkov (RUS) | Mapei–GB | + 51" |
| 3 | Luc Leblanc (FRA) | Team Polti | + 3' 02" |
| 4 | Leonardo Piepoli (ITA) | Refin–Mobilvetta | + 3' 28" |
| 5 | Alexandr Shefer (KAZ) | Asics–CGA | + 3' 40" |
| 6 | Nicola Miceli (ITA) | Aki–Safi | + 3' 45" |
| 7 | Axel Merckx (BEL) | Team Polti | + 5' 52" |
| 8 | Giuseppe Guerini (ITA) | Team Polti | + 6' 17" |
| 9 | Marcos Serrano (ESP) | Kelme–Costa Blanca | + 7' 41" |
| 10 | Giuseppe Di Grande (ITA) | Mapei–GB | + 7' 56" |

== Stage 15 ==
1 June 1997 — Verrès to Borgomanero, 173 km (107 mi)

Stage 15 result

| Rank | Rider | Team | Time |
|---|---|---|---|
| 1 | Alessandro Baronti (ITA) | Asics–CGA | 4h 29' 23" |
| 2 | Filippo Casagrande (ITA) | Scrigno–Gaerne | s.t. |
| 3 | Paolo Savoldelli (ITA) | Roslotto–ZG Mobili | s.t. |
| 4 | Riccardo Forconi (ITA) | Amore & Vita–ForzArcore | + 3" |
| 5 | Andrea Noè (ITA) | Asics–CGA | + 50" |
| 6 | Paolo Bettini (ITA) | MG Maglificio–Technogym | s.t. |
| 7 | Giuseppe Di Grande (ITA) | Mapei–GB | s.t. |
| 8 | Daniele De Paoli (ITA) | Ros Mary–Minotti | s.t. |
| 9 | Wladimir Belli (ITA) | Brescialat–Oyster | s.t. |
| 10 | Luc Leblanc (FRA) | Team Polti | s.t. |

General classification after Stage 15

| Rank | Rider | Team | Time |
|---|---|---|---|
| 1 | Ivan Gotti (ITA) | Saeco–Estro | 70h 24' 51" |
| 2 | Pavel Tonkov (RUS) | Mapei–GB | + 51" |
| 3 | Luc Leblanc (FRA) | Team Polti | + 3' 02" |
| 4 | Alexandr Shefer (KAZ) | Asics–CGA | + 3' 40" |
| 5 | Nicola Miceli (ITA) | Aki–Safi | + 4' 07" |
| 6 | Giuseppe Guerini (ITA) | Team Polti | + 6' 17" |
| 7 | Giuseppe Di Grande (ITA) | Mapei–GB | + 7' 56" |
| 8 | Wladimir Belli (ITA) | Brescialat–Oyster | + 8' 17" |
| 9 | Axel Merckx (BEL) | Team Polti | + 9' 42" |
| 10 | Serhiy Honchar (UKR) | Aki–Safi | + 10' 26" |

== Stage 16 ==
2 June 1997 — Borgomanero to Dalmine, 158 km (98 mi)

Stage 16 result

| Rank | Rider | Team | Time |
|---|---|---|---|
| 1 | Fabiano Fontanelli (ITA) | MG Maglificio–Technogym | 3h 29' 05" |
| 2 | Fabio Roscioli (ITA) | Asics–CGA | s.t. |
| 3 | Angelo Lecchi (ITA) | MG Maglificio–Technogym | s.t. |
| 4 | Alberto Volpi (ITA) | Batik–Del Monte | s.t. |
| 5 | Glenn Magnusson (SWE) | Amore & Vita–ForzArcore | s.t. |
| 6 | Mirko Rossato{{main other| (ITA) | Scrigno–Gaerne | s.t. |
| 7 | Mario Cipollini (ITA) | Saeco–Estro | s.t. |
| 8 | Marcel Wüst (GER) | Festina–Lotus | s.t. |
| 9 | Andrea Vatteroni{{main other| (ITA) | Scrigno–Gaerne | s.t. |
| 10 | Mario Manzoni (ITA) | Roslotto–ZG Mobili | s.t. |

General classification after Stage 16

| Rank | Rider | Team | Time |
|---|---|---|---|
| 1 | Ivan Gotti (ITA) | Saeco–Estro | 73h 53' 56" |
| 2 | Pavel Tonkov (RUS) | Mapei–GB | + 51" |
| 3 | Luc Leblanc (FRA) | Team Polti | + 3' 02" |
| 4 | Alexandr Shefer (KAZ) | Asics–CGA | + 3' 40" |
| 5 | Nicola Miceli (ITA) | Aki–Safi | + 4' 07" |
| 6 | Giuseppe Guerini (ITA) | Team Polti | + 6' 17" |
| 7 | Giuseppe Di Grande (ITA) | Mapei–GB | + 7' 56" |
| 8 | Wladimir Belli (ITA) | Brescialat–Oyster | + 8' 17" |
| 9 | Axel Merckx (BEL) | Team Polti | + 9' 42" |
| 10 | Serhiy Honchar (UKR) | Aki–Safi | + 10' 26" |

== Stage 17 ==
3 June 1997 — Dalmine to Verona, 200 km (120 mi)

Stage 17 result

| Rank | Rider | Team | Time |
|---|---|---|---|
| 1 | Mirco Gualdi (ITA) | Team Polti | 4h 27' 41" |
| 2 | Alessandro Pozzi (ITA) | Cantina Tollo–Carrier–Starplast | s.t. |
| 3 | José Jaime González (COL) | Kelme–Costa Blanca | s.t. |
| 4 | Mariano Piccoli (ITA) | Brescialat–Oyster | + 31" |
| 5 | Marco Vergnani{{main other| (ITA) | Amore & Vita–ForzArcore | s.t. |
| 6 | Cristian Gasperoni (ITA) | Scrigno–Gaerne | s.t. |
| 7 | Andrea Brognara (ITA) | Batik–Del Monte | s.t. |
| 8 | Gianni Faresin (ITA) | Mapei–GB | s.t. |
| 9 | Stefano Finesso (ITA) | Ros Mary–Minotti | + 40" |
| 10 | Viatcheslav Djavanian (RUS) | Roslotto–ZG Mobili | + 1' 31" |

General classification after Stage 17

| Rank | Rider | Team | Time |
|---|---|---|---|
| 1 | Ivan Gotti (ITA) | Saeco–Estro | 78h 27' 23" |
| 2 | Pavel Tonkov (RUS) | Mapei–GB | + 51" |
| 3 | Luc Leblanc (FRA) | Team Polti | + 3' 02" |
| 4 | Alexandr Shefer (KAZ) | Asics–CGA | + 3' 40" |
| 5 | Nicola Miceli (ITA) | Aki–Safi | + 4' 07" |
| 6 | Giuseppe Guerini (ITA) | Team Polti | + 6' 17" |
| 7 | Giuseppe Di Grande (ITA) | Mapei–GB | + 7' 56" |
| 8 | Wladimir Belli (ITA) | Brescialat–Oyster | + 8' 17" |
| 9 | Axel Merckx (BEL) | Team Polti | + 9' 42" |
| 10 | Serhiy Honchar (UKR) | Aki–Safi | + 10' 26" |

== Stage 18 ==
4 June 1997 — Baselga di Pinè to Cavalese, 40 km (25 mi) (ITT)

Stage 18 result

| Rank | Rider | Team | Time |
|---|---|---|---|
| 1 | Serhiy Honchar (UKR) | Aki–Safi | 47' 18" |
| 2 | Evgeni Berzin (RUS) | Batik–Del Monte | + 1' 08" |
| 3 | Bruno Boscardin (ITA) | Festina–Lotus | + 1' 31" |
| 4 | Pavel Padrnos (CZE) | Roslotto–ZG Mobili | + 1' 54" |
| 5 | José Luis Rubiera (ESP) | Kelme–Costa Blanca | + 2' 06" |
| 6 | Denis Zanette (ITA) | Aki–Safi | + 2' 27" |
| 7 | Pavel Tonkov (RUS) | Mapei–GB | + 2' 30" |
| 8 | Paolo Savoldelli (ITA) | Roslotto–ZG Mobili | + 2' 33" |
| 9 | Giuseppe Guerini (ITA) | Team Polti | s.t. |
| 10 | Germano Pierdomenico (ITA) | Cantina Tollo–Carrier–Starplast | + 2' 36" |

General classification after Stage 18

| Rank | Rider | Team | Time |
|---|---|---|---|
| 1 | Ivan Gotti (ITA) | Saeco–Estro | 79h 17' 25" |
| 2 | Pavel Tonkov (RUS) | Mapei–GB | + 37" |
| 3 | Luc Leblanc (FRA) | Team Polti | + 4' 06" |
| 4 | Alexandr Shefer (KAZ) | Asics–CGA | + 5' 19" |
| 5 | Nicola Miceli (ITA) | Aki–Safi | + 5' 48" |
| 6 | Giuseppe Guerini (ITA) | Team Polti | + 6' 06" |
| 7 | Serhiy Honchar (UKR) | Aki–Safi | + 7' 42" |
| 8 | Giuseppe Di Grande (ITA) | Mapei–GB | + 8' 19" |
| 9 | Wladimir Belli (ITA) | Brescialat–Oyster | + 10' 30" |
| 10 | Axel Merckx (BEL) | Team Polti | + 11' 14" |

== Stage 19 ==
5 June 1997 — Predazzo to Pfalzen, 222 km (138 mi)

Stage 19 result

| Rank | Rider | Team | Time |
|---|---|---|---|
| 1 | José Luis Rubiera (ESP) | Kelme–Costa Blanca | 7h 00' 02" |
| 2 | Roberto Conti (ITA) | Mercatone Uno | + 3' 06" |
| 3 | Giuseppe Guerini (ITA) | Team Polti | s.t. |
| 4 | Ivan Gotti (ITA) | Saeco–Estro | + 3' 08" |
| 5 | José Jaime González (COL) | Kelme–Costa Blanca | s.t. |
| 6 | Andrea Noè (ITA) | Asics–CGA | + 3' 33" |
| 7 | Stefano Garzelli (ITA) | Mercatone Uno | + 4' 01" |
| 8 | Pavel Tonkov (RUS) | Mapei–GB | + 4' 03" |
| 9 | Roberto Petito (ITA) | Saeco–Estro | s.t. |
| 10 | Dario Frigo (ITA) | Saeco–Estro | s.t. |

General classification after Stage 19

| Rank | Rider | Team | Time |
|---|---|---|---|
| 1 | Ivan Gotti (ITA) | Saeco–Estro | 86h 20' 35" |
| 2 | Pavel Tonkov (RUS) | Mapei–GB | + 1' 32" |
| 3 | Giuseppe Guerini (ITA) | Team Polti | + 6' 00" |
| 4 | Nicola Miceli (ITA) | Aki–Safi | + 8' 33" |
| 5 | Serhiy Honchar (UKR) | Aki–Safi | + 10' 27" |
| 6 | Giuseppe Di Grande (ITA) | Mapei–GB | + 11' 04" |
| 7 | Wladimir Belli (ITA) | Brescialat–Oyster | + 12' 44" |
| 8 | Marcos Serrano (ESP) | Kelme–Costa Blanca | + 14' 00" |
| 9 | Stefano Garzelli (ITA) | Mercatone Uno | + 14' 42" |
| 10 | José Luis Rubiera (ESP) | Kelme–Costa Blanca | + 15' 09" |

== Stage 20 ==
6 June 1997 — Brunico to Passo del Tonale, 176 km (109 mi)

Stage 20 result

| Rank | Rider | Team | Time |
|---|---|---|---|
| 1 | José Jaime González (COL) | Kelme–Costa Blanca | 4h 45' 03" |
| 2 | Massimo Podenzana (ITA) | Mercatone Uno | + 1' 43" |
| 3 | Felice Puttini (SUI) | Refin–Mobilvetta | + 2' 10" |
| 4 | Gabriele Missaglia (ITA) | Mapei–GB | + 3' 02" |
| 5 | Fausto Dotti (ITA) | Ros Mary–Minotti | s.t. |
| 6 | Germano Pierdomenico (ITA) | Cantina Tollo–Carrier–Starplast | + 4' 02" |
| 7 | Bruno Boscardin (ITA) | Festina–Lotus | + 4' 50" |
| 8 | Evgeni Berzin (RUS) | Batik–Del Monte | + 5' 34" |
| 9 | Alessandro Baronti (ITA) | Asics–CGA | + 7' 41" |
| 10 | Andrea Noè (ITA) | Asics–CGA | + 10' 10" |

General classification after Stage 20

| Rank | Rider | Team | Time |
|---|---|---|---|
| 1 | Ivan Gotti (ITA) | Saeco–Estro | 91h 15' 48" |
| 2 | Pavel Tonkov (RUS) | Mapei–GB | + 1' 32" |
| 3 | Giuseppe Guerini (ITA) | Team Polti | + 6' 00" |
| 4 | Serhiy Honchar (UKR) | Aki–Safi | + 10' 27" |
| 5 | Nicola Miceli (ITA) | Aki–Safi | + 10' 40" |
| 6 | Giuseppe Di Grande (ITA) | Mapei–GB | + 11' 04" |
| 7 | Wladimir Belli (ITA) | Brescialat–Oyster | + 12' 44" |
| 8 | Marcos Serrano (ESP) | Kelme–Costa Blanca | + 14' 00" |
| 9 | Stefano Garzelli (ITA) | Mercatone Uno | + 14' 42" |
| 10 | José Luis Rubiera (ESP) | Kelme–Costa Blanca | + 17' 16" |

== Stage 21 ==
7 June 1997 — Malè to Edolo, 238 km (148 mi)

Stage 21 result

| Rank | Rider | Team | Time |
|---|---|---|---|
| 1 | Pavel Tonkov (RUS) | Mapei–GB | 7h 13' 36" |
| 2 | Ivan Gotti (ITA) | Saeco–Estro | + 1" |
| 3 | Wladimir Belli (ITA) | Brescialat–Oyster | s.t. |
| 4 | José Luis Rubiera (ESP) | Kelme–Costa Blanca | + 1' 33" |
| 5 | Andrea Noè (ITA) | Asics–CGA | s.t. |
| 6 | Nicola Miceli (ITA) | Aki–Safi | s.t. |
| 7 | Giuseppe Guerini (ITA) | Team Polti | s.t. |
| 8 | Giuseppe Di Grande (ITA) | Mapei–GB | s.t. |
| 9 | Daniele De Paoli (ITA) | Ros Mary–Minotti | + 2' 00" |
| 10 | Serhiy Honchar (UKR) | Aki–Safi | s.t. |

General classification after Stage 21

| Rank | Rider | Team | Time |
|---|---|---|---|
| 1 | Ivan Gotti (ITA) | Saeco–Estro | 98h 29' 17" |
| 2 | Pavel Tonkov (RUS) | Mapei–GB | + 1' 27" |
| 3 | Giuseppe Guerini (ITA) | Team Polti | + 7' 40" |
| 4 | Nicola Miceli (ITA) | Aki–Safi | + 12' 20" |
| 5 | Serhiy Honchar (UKR) | Aki–Safi | + 12' 44" |
| 6 | Wladimir Belli (ITA) | Brescialat–Oyster | + 12' 48" |
| 7 | Giuseppe Di Grande (ITA) | Mapei–GB | + 12' 54" |
| 8 | Marcos Serrano (ESP) | Kelme–Costa Blanca | + 16' 07" |
| 9 | Stefano Garzelli (ITA) | Mercatone Uno | + 18' 08" |
| 10 | José Luis Rubiera (ESP) | Kelme–Costa Blanca | + 18' 56" |

== Stage 22 ==
8 June 1997 — Boario Terme to Milan, 165 km (103 mi)

Stage 22 result

| Rank | Rider | Team | Time |
|---|---|---|---|
| 1 | Mario Cipollini (ITA) | Saeco–Estro | 4h 24' 41" |
| 2 | Glenn Magnusson (SWE) | Amore & Vita–ForzArcore | s.t. |
| 3 | Luca Mazzanti (ITA) | Refin–Mobilvetta | s.t. |
| 4 | Nicola Loda (ITA) | MG Maglificio–Technogym | s.t. |
| 5 | Marcel Wüst (GER) | Festina–Lotus | s.t. |
| 6 | Mariano Piccoli (ITA) | Brescialat–Oyster | s.t. |
| 7 | Denis Zanette (ITA) | Aki–Safi | s.t. |
| 8 | Zbigniew Spruch (POL) | Mapei–GB | s.t. |
| 9 | Alexei Sivakov (RUS) | Roslotto–ZG Mobili | s.t. |
| 10 | Martin Hvastija (SLO) | Cantina Tollo–Carrier–Starplast | s.t. |

General classification after Stage 22

| Rank | Rider | Team | Time |
|---|---|---|---|
| 1 | Ivan Gotti (ITA) | Saeco–Estro | 102h 53' 58" |
| 2 | Pavel Tonkov (RUS) | Mapei–GB | + 1' 27" |
| 3 | Giuseppe Guerini (ITA) | Team Polti | + 7' 40" |
| 4 | Nicola Miceli (ITA) | Aki–Safi | + 12' 18" |
| 5 | Serhiy Honchar (UKR) | Aki–Safi | + 12' 44" |
| 6 | Wladimir Belli (ITA) | Brescialat–Oyster | + 12' 48" |
| 7 | Giuseppe Di Grande (ITA) | Mapei–GB | + 12' 54" |
| 8 | Marcos Serrano (ESP) | Kelme–Costa Blanca | + 16' 07" |
| 9 | Stefano Garzelli (ITA) | Mercatone Uno | + 18' 08" |
| 10 | José Luis Rubiera (ESP) | Kelme–Costa Blanca | + 18' 56" |
