= 1998 Giro d'Italia, Stage 12 to Stage 22 =

Cycling race stages

The 1998 Giro d'Italia was the 81st edition of the Giro d'Italia, one of cycling's Grand Tours. The Giro began in Nice, France, with a Prologue individual time trial on 16 May, and Stage 12 occurred on 28 May with a stage from San Marino. The race finished in Milan on 7 June.

== Stage 12 ==
28 May 1998 — San Marino to Carpi, 202 km (126 mi)

Stage 12 result

Rank	Rider	Team	Time
1	Laurent Roux (FRA)	TVM–Farm Frites	4h 37' 08"
2	Serguei Smetanine (RUS)	Vitalicio Seguros	s.t.
3	Germano Pierdomenico (ITA)	Cantina Tollo–Alexia Alluminio	+ 2"
4	Martin Hvastija (SLO)	Cantina Tollo–Alexia Alluminio	+ 6"
5	Paolo Lanfranchi (ITA)	Mapei–Bricobi	s.t.
6	Fabrizio Guidi (ITA)	Team Polti	s.t.
7	Andrei Zintchenko (RUS)	Vitalicio Seguros	s.t.
8	Rolf Järmann (SUI)	Casino–Ag2r	s.t.
9	José Luis Rubiera (ESP)	Kelme–Costa Blanca	s.t.
10	Miguel Ángel Martín Perdiguero (ESP)	Kelme–Costa Blanca	+ 42"

General classification after Stage 12

Rank	Rider	Team	Time
1	Laurent Roux (FRA)	TVM–Farm Frites	58h 39' 50"
2	Andrea Noè (ITA)	Asics–CGA	+ 19"
3	Alex Zülle (SUI)	Festina–Lotus	+ 35"
4	Michele Bartoli (ITA)	Asics–CGA	+ 40"
5	Andrei Zintchenko (RUS)	Vitalicio Seguros	+ 42"
6	Oscar Camenzind (SUI)	Mapei–Bricobi	+ 43"
7	José Luis Rubiera (ESP)	Kelme–Costa Blanca	+ 49"
8	Paolo Lanfranchi (ITA)	Mapei–Bricobi	+ 1' 11"
9	Luc Leblanc (FRA)	Team Polti	+ 1' 25"
10	Marco Pantani (ITA)	Mercatone Uno–Bianchi	+ 1' 26"

== Stage 13 ==
29 May 1998 — Carpi to Schio, 168 km (104 mi)

Stage 13 result

Rank	Rider	Team	Time
1	Michele Bartoli (ITA)	Asics–CGA	3h 58' 02"
2	Giuseppe Guerini (ITA)	Team Polti	s.t.
3	Paolo Bettini (ITA)	Asics–CGA	s.t.
4	Andrea Noè (ITA)	Asics–CGA	+ 3"
5	Davide Rebellin (ITA)	Team Polti	+ 16"
6	José Luis Rubiera (ESP)	Kelme–Costa Blanca	s.t.
7	Nicola Miceli (ITA)	Riso Scotti–MG Maglificio	s.t.
8	Juan Carlos Domínguez (ESP)	Vitalicio Seguros	s.t.
9	Oscar Camenzind (SUI)	Mapei–Bricobi	s.t.
10	Luc Leblanc (FRA)	Team Polti	s.t.

General classification after Stage 13

Rank	Rider	Team	Time
1	Andrea Noè (ITA)	Asics–CGA	62h 38' 14"
2	Michele Bartoli (ITA)	Asics–CGA	+ 6"
3	Alex Zülle (SUI)	Festina–Lotus	+ 37"
4	Oscar Camenzind (SUI)	Mapei–Bricobi	s.t.
5	José Luis Rubiera (ESP)	Kelme–Costa Blanca	+ 43"
6	Laurent Roux (FRA)	TVM–Farm Frites	+ 49"
7	Giuseppe Guerini (ITA)	Team Polti	+ 1' 15"
8	Luc Leblanc (FRA)	Team Polti	+ 1' 19"
9	Marco Pantani (ITA)	Mercatone Uno–Bianchi	+ 1' 20"
10	Pavel Tonkov (RUS)	Mapei–Bricobi	+ 1' 21"

== Stage 14 ==
30 May 1998 — Schio to Piancavallo, 165 km (103 mi)

Stage 14 result

Rank	Rider	Team	Time
1	Marco Pantani (ITA)	Mercatone Uno–Bianchi	4h 22' 11"
2	Pavel Tonkov (RUS)	Mapei–Bricobi	+ 13"
3	Alex Zülle (SUI)	Festina–Lotus	s.t.
4	Giuseppe Guerini (ITA)	Team Polti	+ 28"
5	Andrea Noè (ITA)	Asics–CGA	+ 1' 51"
6	Juan Carlos Domínguez (ESP)	Vitalicio Seguros	+ 2' 02"
7	Marco Velo (ITA)	Mercatone Uno–Bianchi	s.t.
8	Daniele De Paoli (ITA)	Ros Mary–Amica Chips	s.t.
9	Daniel Clavero (ESP)	Vitalicio Seguros	s.t.
10	Riccardo Forconi (ITA)	Mercatone Uno–Bianchi	s.t.

General classification after Stage 14

Rank	Rider	Team	Time
1	Alex Zülle (SUI)	Festina–Lotus	67h 01' 11"
2	Marco Pantani (ITA)	Mercatone Uno–Bianchi	+ 22"
3	Pavel Tonkov (RUS)	Mapei–Bricobi	+ 40"
4	Giuseppe Guerini (ITA)	Team Polti	+ 57"
5	Andrea Noè (ITA)	Asics–CGA	+ 1' 05"
6	Michele Bartoli (ITA)	Asics–CGA	+ 2' 41"
7	Oscar Camenzind (SUI)	Mapei–Bricobi	+ 2' 49"
8	Laurent Roux (FRA)	TVM–Farm Frites	+ 3' 01"
9	Wladimir Belli (ITA)	Festina–Lotus	+ 3' 22"
10	Luc Leblanc (FRA)	Team Polti	+ 3' 31"

== Stage 15 ==
31 May 1998 — Trieste to Trieste, 40 km (25 mi) (ITT)

Stage 15 result

Rank	Rider	Team	Time
1	Alex Zülle (SUI)	Festina–Lotus	44' 38"
2	Serhiy Honchar (UKR)	Cantina Tollo–Alexia Alluminio	+ 53"
3	Pavel Tonkov (RUS)	Mapei–Bricobi	+ 1' 22"
4	Juan Carlos Domínguez (ESP)	Vitalicio Seguros	+ 2' 00"
5	Michele Bartoli (ITA)	Asics–CGA	+ 2' 11"
6	Bruno Boscardin (SUI)	Festina–Lotus	+ 2' 13"
7	Riccardo Forconi (ITA)	Mercatone Uno–Bianchi	+ 2' 16"
8	Oscar Camenzind (SUI)	Mapei–Bricobi	+ 2' 32"
9	Paolo Savoldelli (ITA)	Saeco–Cannondale	+ 2' 33"
10	Artūras Kasputis (LTU)	Casino–Ag2r	+ 2' 44"

General classification after Stage 15

Rank	Rider	Team	Time
1	Alex Zülle (SUI)	Festina–Lotus	67h 45' 49"
2	Pavel Tonkov (RUS)	Mapei–Bricobi	+ 2' 02"
3	Marco Pantani (ITA)	Mercatone Uno–Bianchi	+ 3' 48"
4	Giuseppe Guerini (ITA)	Team Polti	+ 4' 21"
5	Andrea Noè (ITA)	Asics–CGA	+ 4' 34"
6	Michele Bartoli (ITA)	Asics–CGA	+ 4' 52"
7	Oscar Camenzind (SUI)	Mapei–Bricobi	+ 5' 21"
8	Serhiy Honchar (UKR)	Cantina Tollo–Alexia Alluminio	+ 5' 48"
9	Juan Carlos Domínguez (ESP)	Vitalicio Seguros	+ 5' 50"
10	Riccardo Forconi (ITA)	Mercatone Uno–Bianchi	+ 6' 15"

== Stage 16 ==
1 June 1998 — Udine to Asiago, 236 km (147 mi)

Stage 16 result

Rank	Rider	Team	Time
1	Fabiano Fontanelli (ITA)	Mercatone Uno–Bianchi	5h 53' 53"
2	Paolo Bettini (ITA)	Asics–CGA	s.t.
3	Mario Scirea (ITA)	Saeco–Cannondale	s.t.
4	Mariano Piccoli (ITA)	Brescialat–Liquigas	+ 7"
5	Andrea Ferrigato (ITA)	Vitalicio Seguros	s.t.
6	Nicola Loda (ITA)	Ballan	s.t.
7	Enrico Cassani (ITA)	Team Polti	s.t.
8	Javier Otxoa (ESP)	Kelme–Costa Blanca	s.t.
9	Claus Michael Møller (DEN)	TVM–Farm Frites	+ 13"
10	Fabrizio Guidi (ITA)	Team Polti	+ 3' 11"

General classification after Stage 16

Rank	Rider	Team	Time
1	Alex Zülle (SUI)	Festina–Lotus	73h 51' 28"
2	Pavel Tonkov (RUS)	Mapei–Bricobi	+ 2' 02"
3	Paolo Bettini (ITA)	Asics–CGA	+ 3' 20"
4	Marco Pantani (ITA)	Mercatone Uno–Bianchi	+ 3' 48"
5	Giuseppe Guerini (ITA)	Team Polti	+ 4' 21"
6	Andrea Noè (ITA)	Asics–CGA	+ 4' 34"
7	Michele Bartoli (ITA)	Asics–CGA	+ 4' 52"
8	Oscar Camenzind (SUI)	Mapei–Bricobi	+ 5' 31"
9	Serhiy Honchar (UKR)	Cantina Tollo–Alexia Alluminio	+ 5' 48"
10	Juan Carlos Domínguez (ESP)	Vitalicio Seguros	+ 5' 50"

== Stage 17 ==
2 June 1998 — Asiago to Sëlva, 215 km (134 mi)

Stage 17 result

Rank	Rider	Team	Time
1	Giuseppe Guerini (ITA)	Team Polti	6h 16' 58"
2	Marco Pantani (ITA)	Mercatone Uno–Bianchi	s.t.
3	José Jaime González (COL)	Kelme–Costa Blanca	+ 2' 04"
4	Pavel Tonkov (RUS)	Mapei–Bricobi	s.t.
5	Oscar Camenzind (SUI)	Mapei–Bricobi	+ 2' 18"
6	Nicola Miceli (ITA)	Riso Scotti–MG Maglificio	+ 3' 03"
7	Daniele De Paoli (ITA)	Ros Mary–Amica Chips	+ 3' 25"
8	Stefano Garzelli (ITA)	Mercatone Uno–Bianchi	+ 4' 37"
9	Alex Zülle (SUI)	Festina–Lotus	s.t.
10	Daniel Clavero (ESP)	Vitalicio Seguros	s.t.

General classification after Stage 17

Rank	Rider	Team	Time
1	Marco Pantani (ITA)	Mercatone Uno–Bianchi	80h 12' 02"
2	Pavel Tonkov (RUS)	Mapei–Bricobi	+ 30"
3	Giuseppe Guerini (ITA)	Team Polti	+ 31"
4	Alex Zülle (SUI)	Festina–Lotus	+ 1' 01"
5	Oscar Camenzind (SUI)	Mapei–Bricobi	+ 4' 13"
6	Nicola Miceli (ITA)	Riso Scotti–MG Maglificio	+ 7' 18"
7	Riccardo Forconi (ITA)	Mercatone Uno–Bianchi	+ 9' 02"
8	Daniel Clavero (ESP)	Vitalicio Seguros	+ 9' 35"
9	Serhiy Honchar (UKR)	Cantina Tollo–Alexia Alluminio	+ 9' 36"
10	Wladimir Belli (ITA)	Festina–Lotus	+ 10' 22"

== Stage 18 ==
3 June 1998 — Sëlva to Passo di Pampeago, 115 km (71 mi)

Stage 18 result

Rank	Rider	Team	Time
1	Pavel Tonkov (RUS)	Mapei–Bricobi	3h 36' 53"
2	Marco Pantani (ITA)	Mercatone Uno–Bianchi	+ 1"
3	Nicola Miceli (ITA)	Riso Scotti–MG Maglificio	+ 44"
4	Alex Zülle (SUI)	Festina–Lotus	+ 58"
5	Giuseppe Guerini (ITA)	Team Polti	+ 1' 07"
6	Oscar Camenzind (SUI)	Mapei–Bricobi	+ 1' 15"
7	Paolo Bettini (ITA)	Asics–CGA	+ 2' 00"
8	Daniel Clavero (ESP)	Vitalicio Seguros	+ 2' 15"
9	Andrea Noè (ITA)	Asics–CGA	s.t.
10	Francesco Secchiari (ITA)	Scrigno–Gaerne	+ 2' 21"

General classification after Stage 18

Rank	Rider	Team	Time
1	Marco Pantani (ITA)	Mercatone Uno–Bianchi	83h 48' 46"
2	Pavel Tonkov (RUS)	Mapei–Bricobi	+ 27"
3	Giuseppe Guerini (ITA)	Team Polti	+ 1' 47"
4	Alex Zülle (SUI)	Festina–Lotus	+ 2' 08"
5	Oscar Camenzind (SUI)	Mapei–Bricobi	+ 5' 37"
6	Nicola Miceli (ITA)	Riso Scotti–MG Maglificio	+ 8' 07"
7	Daniel Clavero (ESP)	Vitalicio Seguros	+ 11' 59"
8	Paolo Bettini (ITA)	Asics–CGA	+ 13' 10"
9	José Luis Rubiera (ESP)	Kelme–Costa Blanca	+ 13' 23"
10	Serhiy Honchar (UKR)	Cantina Tollo–Alexia Alluminio	+ 15' 28"

== Stage 19 ==
4 June 1998 — Cavalese to Plan di Montecampione, 243 km (151 mi)

Stage 19 result

Rank	Rider	Team	Time
1	Marco Pantani (ITA)	Mercatone Uno–Bianchi	7h 42' 52"
2	Pavel Tonkov (RUS)	Mapei–Bricobi	+ 57"
3	Giuseppe Guerini (ITA)	Team Polti	+ 3' 16"
4	Francesco Secchiari (ITA)	Scrigno–Gaerne	+ 4' 04"
5	Daniel Clavero (ESP)	Vitalicio Seguros	s.t.
6	Daniele De Paoli (ITA)	Ros Mary–Amica Chips	+ 4' 16"
7	Oscar Camenzind (SUI)	Mapei–Bricobi	+ 5' 43"
8	Nicola Miceli (ITA)	Riso Scotti–MG Maglificio	+ 5' 44"
9	José Jaime González (COL)	Kelme–Costa Blanca	+ 5' 46"
10	Paolo Bettini (ITA)	Asics–CGA	+ 5' 48"

General classification after Stage 19

Rank	Rider	Team	Time
1	Marco Pantani (ITA)	Mercatone Uno–Bianchi	91h 31' 28"
2	Pavel Tonkov (RUS)	Mapei–Bricobi	+ 1' 28"
3	Giuseppe Guerini (ITA)	Team Polti	+ 5' 11"
4	Oscar Camenzind (SUI)	Mapei–Bricobi	+ 11' 32"
5	Nicola Miceli (ITA)	Riso Scotti–MG Maglificio	+ 14' 23"
6	Daniel Clavero (ESP)	Vitalicio Seguros	+ 16' 15"
7	Paolo Bettini (ITA)	Asics–CGA	+ 19' 10"
8	Gianni Faresin (ITA)	Mapei–Bricobi	+ 24' 17"
9	Daniele De Paoli (ITA)	Ros Mary–Amica Chips	+ 26' 01"
10	Serhiy Honchar (UKR)	Cantina Tollo–Alexia Alluminio	+ 26' 28"

== Stage 20 ==
5 June 1998 — Darfo Boario Terme to Mendrisio, 143 km (89 mi)

Stage 20 result

Rank	Rider	Team	Time
1	Gian Matteo Fagnini (ITA)	Saeco–Cannondale	3h 31' 33"
2	Mariano Piccoli (ITA)	Brescialat–Liquigas	s.t.
3	Wladimir Belli (ITA)	Festina–Lotus	s.t.
4	Gabriele Colombo (ITA)	Ballan	s.t.
5	Davide Rebellin (ITA)	Team Polti	s.t.
6	Alexandr Shefer (KAZ)	Asics–CGA	s.t.
7	Felice Puttini (SUI)	Ros Mary–Amica Chips	s.t.
8	Federico Profeti (ITA)	Amore & Vita–ForzArcore	s.t.
9	Paolo Lanfranchi (ITA)	Mapei–Bricobi	s.t.
10	Daniele De Paoli (ITA)	Ros Mary–Amica Chips	s.t.

General classification after Stage 20

Rank	Rider	Team	Time
1	Marco Pantani (ITA)	Mercatone Uno–Bianchi	95h 10' 15"
2	Pavel Tonkov (RUS)	Mapei–Bricobi	+ 1' 28"
3	Giuseppe Guerini (ITA)	Team Polti	+ 5' 11"
4	Oscar Camenzind (SUI)	Mapei–Bricobi	+ 11' 32"
5	Nicola Miceli (ITA)	Riso Scotti–MG Maglificio	+ 14' 23"
6	Daniel Clavero (ESP)	Vitalicio Seguros	+ 16' 15"
7	Gianni Faresin (ITA)	Mapei–Bricobi	+ 16' 57"
8	Daniele De Paoli (ITA)	Ros Mary–Amica Chips	+ 18' 41"
9	Paolo Bettini (ITA)	Asics–CGA	+ 19' 10"
10	Paolo Savoldelli (ITA)	Saeco–Cannondale	+ 25' 09"

== Stage 21 ==
6 June 1998 — Mendrisio to Lugano, 34 km (21 mi) (ITT)

Stage 21 result

Rank	Rider	Team	Time
1	Serhiy Honchar (UKR)	Cantina Tollo–Alexia Alluminio	39' 54"
2	Massimo Podenzana (ITA)	Mercatone Uno–Bianchi	+ 29"
3	Marco Pantani (ITA)	Mercatone Uno–Bianchi	+ 30"
4	Marco Velo (ITA)	Mercatone Uno–Bianchi	+ 31"
5	Pavel Tonkov (RUS)	Mapei–Bricobi	+ 35"
6	Marco Serpellini (ITA)	Brescialat–Liquigas	+ 1' 01"
7	Oscar Camenzind (SUI)	Mapei–Bricobi	+ 1' 14"
8	Paolo Savoldelli (ITA)	Saeco–Cannondale	+ 1' 15"
9	Alex Zülle (SUI)	Festina–Lotus	+ 1' 32"
10	Claus Michael Møller (DEN)	TVM–Farm Frites	+ 1' 40"

General classification after Stage 21

Rank	Rider	Team	Time
1	Marco Pantani (ITA)	Mercatone Uno–Bianchi	95h 50' 39"
2	Pavel Tonkov (RUS)	Mapei–Bricobi	+ 1' 33"
3	Giuseppe Guerini (ITA)	Team Polti	+ 6' 51"
4	Oscar Camenzind (SUI)	Mapei–Bricobi	+ 12' 16"
5	Daniel Clavero (ESP)	Vitalicio Seguros	+ 18' 04"
6	Gianni Faresin (ITA)	Mapei–Bricobi	+ 18' 31"
7	Paolo Bettini (ITA)	Asics–CGA	+ 21' 03"
8	Daniele De Paoli (ITA)	Ros Mary–Amica Chips	+ 21' 35"
9	Paolo Savoldelli (ITA)	Saeco–Cannondale	+ 25' 54"
10	Serhiy Honchar (UKR)	Cantina Tollo–Alexia Alluminio	+ 25' 58"

== Stage 22 ==
7 June 1998 — Lugano to Milan, 102 km (63 mi)

Stage 22 result

Rank	Rider	Team	Time
1	Gian Matteo Fagnini (ITA)	Saeco–Cannondale	2h 57' 53"
2	Massimo Strazzer (ITA)	Cantina Tollo–Alexia Alluminio	s.t.
3	Zbigniew Spruch (POL)	Mapei–Bricobi	s.t.
4	José Luis Rubiera (ESP)	Kelme–Costa Blanca	s.t.
5	Mariano Piccoli (ITA)	Brescialat–Liquigas	s.t.
6	Mirco Gualdi (ITA)	Team Polti	s.t.
7	Nicola Loda (ITA)	Ballan	s.t.
8	Luca Mazzanti (ITA)	Cantina Tollo–Alexia Alluminio	s.t.
9	Martin Hvastija (SLO)	Cantina Tollo–Alexia Alluminio	s.t.
10	Marco Serpellini (ITA)	Brescialat–Liquigas	s.t.

General classification after Stage 22

Rank	Rider	Team	Time
1	Marco Pantani (ITA)	Mercatone Uno–Bianchi	98h 48' 32"
2	Pavel Tonkov (RUS)	Mapei–Bricobi	+ 1' 33"
3	Giuseppe Guerini (ITA)	Team Polti	+ 6' 51"
4	Oscar Camenzind (SUI)	Mapei–Bricobi	+ 12' 16"
5	Daniel Clavero (ESP)	Vitalicio Seguros	+ 18' 04"
6	Gianni Faresin (ITA)	Mapei–Bricobi	+ 18' 31"
7	Paolo Bettini (ITA)	Asics–CGA	+ 21' 03"
8	Daniele De Paoli (ITA)	Ros Mary–Amica Chips	+ 21' 35"
9	Paolo Savoldelli (ITA)	Saeco–Cannondale	+ 25' 54"
10	Serhiy Honchar (UKR)	Cantina Tollo–Alexia Alluminio	+ 25' 58"
