= 1998 Giro d'Italia, Prologue to Stage 11 =

Cycling race stages

The 1998 Giro d'Italia was the 81st edition of the Giro d'Italia, one of cycling's Grand Tours. The Giro began in Nice, France, with a Prologue individual time trial on 16 May, and Stage 11 occurred on 27 May with a stage to San Marino. The race finished in Milan on 7 June.

== Prologue ==
16 May 1998 — Nice to Nice, 7 km (4.3 mi) (ITT)

Prologue result and general classification after Prologue

| Rank | Rider | Team | Time |
|---|---|---|---|
| 1 | Alex Zülle (SUI) | Festina–Lotus | 7' 55" |
| 2 | Serhiy Honchar (UKR) | Cantina Tollo–Alexia Alluminio | + 1" |
| 3 | Artūras Kasputis (LTU) | Casino–Ag2r | + 10" |
| 4 | Marco Velo (ITA) | Mercatone Uno–Bianchi | + 13" |
| 5 | Antonio Tauler (ESP) | Ros Mary–Amica Chips | + 14" |
| 6 | Massimo Podenzana (ITA) | Mercatone Uno–Bianchi | + 16" |
| 7 | Fabiano Fontanelli (ITA) | Mercatone Uno–Bianchi | + 17" |
| 8 | Juan Carlos Domínguez (ESP) | Vitalicio Seguros | s.t. |
| 9 | Carlo Finco (ITA) | Ballan | + 18" |
| 10 | Gabriele Colombo (ITA) | Ballan | s.t. |

== Stage 1 ==
17 May 1998 — Nice to Cuneo, 162 km (101 mi)

Stage 1 result

| Rank | Rider | Team | Time |
|---|---|---|---|
| 1 | Mariano Piccoli (ITA) | Brescialat–Liquigas | 3h 55' 39" |
| 2 | Michele Bartoli (ITA) | Asics–CGA | s.t. |
| 3 | Fabrizio Guidi (ITA) | Team Polti | s.t. |
| 4 | Ángel Edo (ESP) | Kelme–Costa Blanca | s.t. |
| 5 | Nicola Minali (ITA) | Riso Scotti–MG Maglificio | s.t. |
| 6 | Mario Cipollini (ITA) | Saeco–Cannondale | s.t. |
| 7 | Endrio Leoni (ITA) | Ballan | s.t. |
| 8 | Francesco Arazzi (ITA) | Ros Mary–Amica Chips | s.t. |
| 9 | Fabio Baldato (ITA) | Riso Scotti–MG Maglificio | s.t. |
| 10 | Fabiano Fontanelli (ITA) | Mercatone Uno–Bianchi | s.t. |

General classification after Stage 1

| Rank | Rider | Team | Time |
|---|---|---|---|
| 1 | Alex Zülle (SUI) | Festina–Lotus | 4h 03' 34" |
| 2 | Serhiy Honchar (UKR) | Cantina Tollo–Alexia Alluminio | + 1" |
| 3 | Artūras Kasputis (LTU) | Casino–Ag2r | + 10" |
| 4 | Michele Bartoli (ITA) | Asics–CGA | + 12" |
| 5 | Marco Velo (ITA) | Mercatone Uno–Bianchi | + 13" |
| 6 | Antonio Tauler (ESP) | Ros Mary–Amica Chips | + 14" |
| 7 | Massimo Podenzana (ITA) | Mercatone Uno–Bianchi | + 16" |
| 8 | Fabiano Fontanelli (ITA) | Mercatone Uno–Bianchi | + 17" |
| 9 | Juan Carlos Domínguez (ESP) | Vitalicio Seguros | s.t. |
| 10 | Carlo Finco (ITA) | Ballan | + 18" |

== Stage 2 ==
18 May 1998 — Alba to Imperia, 160 km (99 mi)

Stage 2 result

| Rank | Rider | Team | Time |
|---|---|---|---|
| 1 | Ángel Edo (ESP) | Kelme–Costa Blanca | 3h 53' 23" |
| 2 | Mariano Piccoli (ITA) | Brescialat–Liquigas | s.t. |
| 3 | Nicola Loda (ITA) | Ballan | s.t. |
| 4 | Michele Bartoli (ITA) | Asics–CGA | s.t. |
| 5 | Gian Matteo Fagnini (ITA) | Saeco–Cannondale | s.t. |
| 6 | Wladimir Belli (ITA) | Festina–Lotus | s.t. |
| 7 | Fabio Baldato (ITA) | Riso Scotti–MG Maglificio | s.t. |
| 8 | Gabriele Missaglia (ITA) | Mapei–Bricobi | s.t. |
| 9 | Davide Rebellin (ITA) | Team Polti | s.t. |
| 10 | Glenn Magnusson (SWE) | Amore & Vita–ForzArcore | s.t. |

General classification after Stage 2

| Rank | Rider | Team | Time |
|---|---|---|---|
| 1 | Alex Zülle (SUI) | Festina–Lotus | 7h 56' 57" |
| 2 | Serhiy Honchar (UKR) | Cantina Tollo–Alexia Alluminio | + 1" |
| 3 | Michele Bartoli (ITA) | Asics–CGA | + 10" |
| 4 | Mariano Piccoli (ITA) | Brescialat–Liquigas | + 13" |
| 5 | Marco Velo (ITA) | Mercatone Uno–Bianchi | s.t. |
| 6 | Massimo Podenzana (ITA) | Mercatone Uno–Bianchi | + 16" |
| 7 | Juan Carlos Domínguez (ESP) | Vitalicio Seguros | + 17" |
| 8 | Gabriele Colombo (ITA) | Ballan | + 18" |
| 9 | José Enrique Gutiérrez (ESP) | Kelme–Costa Blanca | s.t. |
| 10 | Riccardo Forconi (ITA) | Mercatone Uno–Bianchi | + 19" |

== Stage 3 ==
19 May 1998 — Rapallo to Forte dei Marmi, 196 km (122 mi)

Stage 3 result

| Rank | Rider | Team | Time |
|---|---|---|---|
| 1 | Nicola Minali (ITA) | Riso Scotti–MG Maglificio | 4h 44' 34" |
| 2 | Massimo Strazzer (ITA) | Cantina Tollo–Alexia Alluminio | s.t. |
| 3 | Francesco Arazzi (ITA) | Ros Mary–Amica Chips | s.t. |
| 4 | Alessandro Petacchi (ITA) | Scrigno–Gaerne | s.t. |
| 5 | Giancarlo Raimondi (ITA) | Brescialat–Liquigas | s.t. |
| 6 | Silvio Martinello (ITA) | Team Polti | s.t. |
| 7 | Federico Colonna (ITA) | Asics–CGA | s.t. |
| 8 | Glenn Magnusson (SWE) | Amore & Vita–ForzArcore | s.t. |
| 9 | Jeroen Blijlevens (NED) | TVM–Farm Frites | s.t. |
| 10 | Zbigniew Spruch (POL) | Mapei–Bricobi | s.t. |

General classification after Stage 3

| Rank | Rider | Team | Time |
|---|---|---|---|
| 1 | Serhiy Honchar (UKR) | Cantina Tollo–Alexia Alluminio | 12h 41' 32" |
| 2 | Michele Bartoli (ITA) | Asics–CGA | + 9" |
| 3 | Mariano Piccoli (ITA) | Brescialat–Liquigas | + 12" |
| 4 | Marco Velo (ITA) | Mercatone Uno–Bianchi | s.t. |
| 5 | Alex Zülle (SUI) | Festina–Lotus | s.t. |
| 6 | Juan Carlos Domínguez (ESP) | Vitalicio Seguros | + 16" |
| 7 | José Enrique Gutiérrez (ESP) | Kelme–Costa Blanca | s.t. |
| 8 | Riccardo Forconi (ITA) | Mercatone Uno–Bianchi | + 18" |
| 9 | Oscar Camenzind (SUI) | Mapei–Bricobi | + 20" |
| 10 | Pavel Tonkov (RUS) | Mapei–Bricobi | + 22" |

== Stage 4 ==
20 May 1998 — Viareggio to Monte Argentario, 239 km (149 mi)

Stage 4 result

| Rank | Rider | Team | Time |
|---|---|---|---|
| 1 | Nicola Miceli (ITA) | Riso Scotti–MG Maglificio | 6h 15' 29" |
| 2 | Michele Bartoli (ITA) | Asics–CGA | + 3" |
| 3 | Mariano Piccoli (ITA) | Brescialat–Liquigas | s.t. |
| 4 | Ángel Edo (ESP) | Kelme–Costa Blanca | s.t. |
| 5 | Fabio Baldato (ITA) | Riso Scotti–MG Maglificio | s.t. |
| 6 | Davide Rebellin (ITA) | Team Polti | s.t. |
| 7 | Luca Mazzanti (ITA) | Cantina Tollo–Alexia Alluminio | s.t. |
| 8 | Alessandro Petacchi (ITA) | Scrigno–Gaerne | s.t. |
| 9 | Endrio Leoni (ITA) | Ballan | s.t. |
| 10 | Bruno Cenghialta (ITA) | Riso Scotti–MG Maglificio | s.t. |

General classification after Stage 4

| Rank | Rider | Team | Time |
|---|---|---|---|
| 1 | Serhiy Honchar (UKR) | Cantina Tollo–Alexia Alluminio | 18h 57' 04" |
| 2 | Michele Bartoli (ITA) | Asics–CGA | + 1" |
| 3 | Mariano Piccoli (ITA) | Brescialat–Liquigas | + 8" |
| 4 | Marco Velo (ITA) | Mercatone Uno–Bianchi | + 12" |
| 5 | Alex Zülle (SUI) | Festina–Lotus | s.t. |
| 6 | Juan Carlos Domínguez (ESP) | Vitalicio Seguros | + 16" |
| 7 | José Enrique Gutiérrez (ESP) | Kelme–Costa Blanca | + 17" |
| 8 | Riccardo Forconi (ITA) | Mercatone Uno–Bianchi | + 18" |
| 9 | Oscar Camenzind (SUI) | Mapei–Bricobi | + 20" |
| 10 | Pavel Tonkov (RUS) | Mapei–Bricobi | + 22" |

== Stage 5 ==
21 May 1998 — Orbetello to Frascati, 206 km (128 mi)

Stage 5 result

| Rank | Rider | Team | Time |
|---|---|---|---|
| 1 | Mario Cipollini (ITA) | Saeco–Cannondale | 4h 44' 25" |
| 2 | Silvio Martinello (ITA) | Team Polti | s.t. |
| 3 | Serguei Smetanine (RUS) | Vitalicio Seguros | s.t. |
| 4 | Fabio Baldato (ITA) | Riso Scotti–MG Maglificio | s.t. |
| 5 | Michele Bartoli (ITA) | Asics–CGA | s.t. |
| 6 | Luca Mazzanti (ITA) | Cantina Tollo–Alexia Alluminio | s.t. |
| 7 | Nicola Loda (ITA) | Ballan | s.t. |
| 8 | Ángel Edo (ESP) | Kelme–Costa Blanca | s.t. |
| 9 | Gabriele Missaglia (ITA) | Mapei–Bricobi | s.t. |
| 10 | Zbigniew Spruch (POL) | Mapei–Bricobi | s.t. |

General classification after Stage 5

| Rank | Rider | Team | Time |
|---|---|---|---|
| 1 | Michele Bartoli (ITA) | Asics–CGA | 23h 41' 26" |
| 2 | Serhiy Honchar (UKR) | Cantina Tollo–Alexia Alluminio | + 3" |
| 3 | Mariano Piccoli (ITA) | Brescialat–Liquigas | + 11" |
| 4 | Marco Velo (ITA) | Mercatone Uno–Bianchi | + 15" |
| 5 | Alex Zülle (SUI) | Festina–Lotus | s.t. |
| 6 | Juan Carlos Domínguez (ESP) | Vitalicio Seguros | + 19" |
| 7 | José Enrique Gutiérrez (ESP) | Kelme–Costa Blanca | + 20" |
| 8 | Riccardo Forconi (ITA) | Mercatone Uno–Bianchi | + 21" |
| 9 | Oscar Camenzind (SUI) | Mapei–Bricobi | + 23" |
| 10 | Pavel Tonkov (RUS) | Mapei–Bricobi | + 25" |

== Stage 6 ==
22 May 1998 — Maddaloni to Lago Laceno, 160 km (99 mi)

Stage 6 result

| Rank | Rider | Team | Time |
|---|---|---|---|
| 1 | Alex Zülle (SUI) | Festina–Lotus | 4h 21' 43" |
| 2 | Michele Bartoli (ITA) | Asics–CGA | + 24" |
| 3 | Luc Leblanc (FRA) | Team Polti | s.t. |
| 4 | Marco Pantani (ITA) | Mercatone Uno–Bianchi | s.t. |
| 5 | Davide Rebellin (ITA) | Team Polti | + 34" |
| 6 | Wladimir Belli (ITA) | Festina–Lotus | s.t. |
| 7 | Nicola Miceli (ITA) | Riso Scotti–MG Maglificio | s.t. |
| 8 | Giuseppe Guerini (ITA) | Team Polti | s.t. |
| 9 | Enrico Zaina (ITA) | Brescialat–Liquigas | s.t. |
| 10 | Dario Frigo (ITA) | Saeco–Cannondale | s.t. |

General classification after Stage 6

| Rank | Rider | Team | Time |
|---|---|---|---|
| 1 | Alex Zülle (SUI) | Festina–Lotus | 28h 03' 12" |
| 2 | Michele Bartoli (ITA) | Asics–CGA | + 13" |
| 3 | Luc Leblanc (FRA) | Team Polti | + 50" |
| 4 | Pavel Tonkov (RUS) | Mapei–Bricobi | + 56" |
| 5 | Paolo Savoldelli (ITA) | Saeco–Cannondale | + 57" |
| 6 | Marco Pantani (ITA) | Mercatone Uno–Bianchi | + 1' 02" |
| 7 | Nicola Miceli (ITA) | Riso Scotti–MG Maglificio | + 1' 03" |
| 8 | Dario Frigo (ITA) | Saeco–Cannondale | + 1' 04" |
| 9 | Ivan Gotti (ITA) | Saeco–Cannondale | s.t. |
| 10 | Enrico Zaina (ITA) | Brescialat–Liquigas | + 1' 08" |

== Stage 7 ==
23 May 1998 — Montella to Matera, 235 km (146 mi)

Stage 7 result

| Rank | Rider | Team | Time |
|---|---|---|---|
| 1 | Mario Cipollini (ITA) | Saeco–Cannondale | 6h 30' 00" |
| 2 | Fabio Baldato (ITA) | Riso Scotti–MG Maglificio | s.t. |
| 3 | Ángel Edo (ESP) | Kelme–Costa Blanca | s.t. |
| 4 | Glenn Magnusson (SWE) | Amore & Vita–ForzArcore | s.t. |
| 5 | Michele Bartoli (ITA) | Asics–CGA | s.t. |
| 6 | Endrio Leoni (ITA) | Ballan | s.t. |
| 7 | Enrico Cassani (ITA) | Team Polti | s.t. |
| 8 | Serguei Smetanine (RUS) | Vitalicio Seguros | s.t. |
| 9 | Andrey Kivilev (KAZ) | Festina–Lotus | s.t. |
| 10 | Mariano Piccoli (ITA) | Brescialat–Liquigas | s.t. |

General classification after Stage 7

| Rank | Rider | Team | Time |
|---|---|---|---|
| 1 | Alex Zülle (SUI) | Festina–Lotus | 34h 33' 12" |
| 2 | Michele Bartoli (ITA) | Asics–CGA | + 11" |
| 3 | Luc Leblanc (FRA) | Team Polti | + 50" |
| 4 | Pavel Tonkov (RUS) | Mapei–Bricobi | + 56" |
| 5 | Paolo Savoldelli (ITA) | Saeco–Cannondale | + 57" |
| 6 | Marco Pantani (ITA) | Mercatone Uno–Bianchi | + 1' 02" |
| 7 | Nicola Miceli (ITA) | Riso Scotti–MG Maglificio | + 1' 03" |
| 8 | Dario Frigo (ITA) | Saeco–Cannondale | + 1' 04" |
| 9 | Ivan Gotti (ITA) | Saeco–Cannondale | s.t. |
| 10 | Enrico Zaina (ITA) | Brescialat–Liquigas | + 1' 08" |

== Stage 8 ==
24 May 1998 — Matera to Lecce, 191 km (119 mi)

Stage 8 result

| Rank | Rider | Team | Time |
|---|---|---|---|
| 1 | Mario Cipollini (ITA) | Saeco–Cannondale | 5h 08' 47" |
| 2 | Silvio Martinello (ITA) | Team Polti | s.t. |
| 3 | Endrio Leoni (ITA) | Ballan | s.t. |
| 4 | Francesco Arazzi (ITA) | Ros Mary–Amica Chips | s.t. |
| 5 | Alessandro Petacchi (ITA) | Scrigno–Gaerne | s.t. |
| 6 | Massimo Strazzer (ITA) | Cantina Tollo–Alexia Alluminio | s.t. |
| 7 | Nicola Loda (ITA) | Ballan | s.t. |
| 8 | Ángel Edo (ESP) | Kelme–Costa Blanca | s.t. |
| 9 | Federico Colonna (ITA) | Asics–CGA | s.t. |
| 10 | Marco Zanotti (ITA) | Vini Caldirola | s.t. |

General classification after Stage 8

| Rank | Rider | Team | Time |
|---|---|---|---|
| 1 | Alex Zülle (SUI) | Festina–Lotus | 39h 41' 59" |
| 2 | Michele Bartoli (ITA) | Asics–CGA | + 5" |
| 3 | Luc Leblanc (FRA) | Team Polti | + 50" |
| 4 | Pavel Tonkov (RUS) | Mapei–Bricobi | + 56" |
| 5 | Paolo Savoldelli (ITA) | Saeco–Cannondale | + 57" |
| 6 | Marco Pantani (ITA) | Mercatone Uno–Bianchi | + 1' 02" |
| 7 | Nicola Miceli (ITA) | Riso Scotti–MG Maglificio | + 1' 03" |
| 8 | Ivan Gotti (ITA) | Saeco–Cannondale | + 1' 04" |
| 9 | Dario Frigo (ITA) | Saeco–Cannondale | s.t. |
| 10 | Enrico Zaina (ITA) | Brescialat–Liquigas | + 1' 08" |

== Stage 9 ==
25 May 1998 — Foggia to Vasto, 169 km (105 mi)

Stage 9 result

| Rank | Rider | Team | Time |
|---|---|---|---|
| 1 | Glenn Magnusson (SWE) | Amore & Vita–ForzArcore | 3h 55' 43" |
| 2 | Silvio Martinello (ITA) | Team Polti | s.t. |
| 3 | Mario Cipollini (ITA) | Saeco–Cannondale | s.t. |
| 4 | Zbigniew Spruch (POL) | Mapei–Bricobi | s.t. |
| 5 | Fabiano Fontanelli (ITA) | Mercatone Uno–Bianchi | s.t. |
| 6 | Endrio Leoni (ITA) | Ballan | s.t. |
| 7 | Geert Van Bondt (BEL) | TVM–Farm Frites | s.t. |
| 8 | Michele Bartoli (ITA) | Asics–CGA | s.t. |
| 9 | Alessandro Petacchi (ITA) | Scrigno–Gaerne | s.t. |
| 10 | Mariano Piccoli (ITA) | Brescialat–Liquigas | s.t. |

General classification after Stage 9

| Rank | Rider | Team | Time |
|---|---|---|---|
| 1 | Alex Zülle (SUI) | Festina–Lotus | 43h 37' 42" |
| 2 | Michele Bartoli (ITA) | Asics–CGA | + 5" |
| 3 | Luc Leblanc (FRA) | Team Polti | + 50" |
| 4 | Pavel Tonkov (RUS) | Mapei–Bricobi | + 56" |
| 5 | Paolo Savoldelli (ITA) | Saeco–Cannondale | + 57" |
| 6 | Marco Pantani (ITA) | Mercatone Uno–Bianchi | + 1' 02" |
| 7 | Nicola Miceli (ITA) | Riso Scotti–MG Maglificio | + 1' 03" |
| 8 | Ivan Gotti (ITA) | Saeco–Cannondale | + 1' 04" |
| 9 | Dario Frigo (ITA) | Saeco–Cannondale | s.t. |
| 10 | Enrico Zaina (ITA) | Brescialat–Liquigas | + 1' 08" |

== Stage 10 ==
26 May 1998 — Vasto to Macerata, 212 km (132 mi)

Stage 10 result

| Rank | Rider | Team | Time |
|---|---|---|---|
| 1 | Mario Cipollini (ITA) | Saeco–Cannondale | 5h 10' 43" |
| 2 | Silvio Martinello (ITA) | Team Polti | s.t. |
| 3 | Endrio Leoni (ITA) | Ballan | s.t. |
| 4 | Francesco Arazzi (ITA) | Ros Mary–Amica Chips | s.t. |
| 5 | Fabio Baldato (ITA) | Riso Scotti–MG Maglificio | s.t. |
| 6 | Alessandro Petacchi (ITA) | Scrigno–Gaerne | s.t. |
| 7 | Federico Colonna (ITA) | Asics–CGA | s.t. |
| 8 | Biagio Conte (ITA) | Scrigno–Gaerne | s.t. |
| 9 | Fabiano Fontanelli (ITA) | Mercatone Uno–Bianchi | s.t. |
| 10 | Ángel Edo (ESP) | Kelme–Costa Blanca | s.t. |

General classification after Stage 10

| Rank | Rider | Team | Time |
|---|---|---|---|
| 1 | Alex Zülle (SUI) | Festina–Lotus | 48h 48' 25" |
| 2 | Michele Bartoli (ITA) | Asics–CGA | + 5" |
| 3 | Luc Leblanc (FRA) | Team Polti | + 50" |
| 4 | Pavel Tonkov (RUS) | Mapei–Bricobi | + 56" |
| 5 | Paolo Savoldelli (ITA) | Saeco–Cannondale | + 57" |
| 6 | Marco Pantani (ITA) | Mercatone Uno–Bianchi | + 1' 02" |
| 7 | Nicola Miceli (ITA) | Riso Scotti–MG Maglificio | + 1' 03" |
| 8 | Ivan Gotti (ITA) | Saeco–Cannondale | + 1' 04" |
| 9 | Dario Frigo (ITA) | Saeco–Cannondale | s.t. |
| 10 | Enrico Zaina (ITA) | Brescialat–Liquigas | + 1' 08" |

== Stage 11 ==
27 May 1998 — Macerata to San Marino, 214 km (133 mi)

Stage 11 result

| Rank | Rider | Team | Time |
|---|---|---|---|
| 1 | Andrea Noè (ITA) | Asics–CGA | 5h 12' 20" |
| 2 | Marco Pantani (ITA) | Mercatone Uno–Bianchi | + 7" |
| 3 | Pavel Tonkov (RUS) | Mapei–Bricobi | + 10" |
| 4 | Davide Rebellin (ITA) | Team Polti | s.t. |
| 5 | Ivan Gotti (ITA) | Saeco–Cannondale | s.t. |
| 6 | Michele Bartoli (ITA) | Asics–CGA | s.t. |
| 7 | Alex Zülle (SUI) | Festina–Lotus | s.t. |
| 8 | Luc Leblanc (FRA) | Team Polti | s.t. |
| 9 | Laurent Roux (FRA) | TVM–Farm Frites | s.t. |
| 10 | Giuseppe Guerini (ITA) | Team Polti | s.t. |

General classification after Stage 11

| Rank | Rider | Team | Time |
|---|---|---|---|
| 1 | Alex Zülle (SUI) | Festina–Lotus | 54h 00' 55" |
| 2 | Michele Bartoli (ITA) | Asics–CGA | + 5" |
| 3 | Luc Leblanc (FRA) | Team Polti | + 50" |
| 4 | Marco Pantani (ITA) | Mercatone Uno–Bianchi | + 51" |
| 5 | Pavel Tonkov (RUS) | Mapei–Bricobi | + 52" |
| 6 | Nicola Miceli (ITA) | Riso Scotti–MG Maglificio | + 1' 03" |
| 7 | Ivan Gotti (ITA) | Saeco–Cannondale | + 1' 04" |
| 8 | Dario Frigo (ITA) | Saeco–Cannondale | s.t. |
| 9 | Enrico Zaina (ITA) | Brescialat–Liquigas | + 1' 08" |
| 10 | Giuseppe Guerini (ITA) | Team Polti | + 1' 10" |
