= 1998 Giro d'Italia =

Race details
- Dates: 16 May - 7 June 1998
- Stages: 22 + prologue
- Distance: 3,830 km (2,380 mi)
- Winning time: 98h 48' 32"

Results
Jersey awarded to the overall winner	Winner	Marco Pantani (ITA)	(Mercatone Uno–Bianchi)
	Second	Pavel Tonkov (RUS)	(Mapei–Bricobi)
	Third	Giuseppe Guerini (ITA)	(Team Polti)
Jersey awarded to the points classification winner	Points	Mariano Piccoli (ITA)	(Brescialat–Liquigas)
Jersey awarded to the mountains classification winner	Mountains	Marco Pantani (ITA)	(Mercatone Uno–Bianchi)
Jersey awarded to the intergiro classification winner	Intergiro	Gian Matteo Fagnini (ITA)	(Saeco–Cannondale)
	Team	Mapei–Bricobi	
	Team points	Team Polti	

The 1998 Giro d'Italia was the 81st edition of the Giro. It began on 16 May with a brief 8 km (5 mi) prologue that navigated through the streets of the French city Nice. The race came to a close on 7 June with a mass-start stage that ended in the Italian city of Milan. Eighteen teams entered the race that was won by the Italian Marco Pantani of the Mercatone Uno–Bianchi team. Second and third were the Russian rider Pavel Tonkov and Italian Giuseppe Guerini.

In the race's other classifications, overall winner Marco Pantani also won the mountains classification, Mariano Piccoli of the Brescialat-Liquigas team won the points classification, and Saeco–Cannondale rider Gian Matteo Fagnini won the intergiro classification. Mapei–Bricobi finished as the winners of the Trofeo Fast Team classification, ranking each of the eighteen teams contesting the race by lowest cumulative time. The other team classification, the Trofeo Super Team classification, where the teams' riders are awarded points for placing within the top twenty in each stage and the points are then totaled for each team was won by Team Polti.

== Teams ==
A total of 18 teams were invited to participate in the 1998 Giro d'Italia. Each team sent a squad of nine riders, so the Giro began with a peloton of 162 cyclists. The presentation of the teams – where each team's roster and manager were introduced in front the media and local dignitaries – took place on the Apollon Concert Hall. Out of the 162 riders that started this edition of the Giro d'Italia, a total of 94 riders made it to the finish in Milan.

The 18 teams that took part in the race were:

- Amore & Vita–ForzArcore
- Asics–CGA
- Ballan
- Brescialat–Liquigas
- Cantina Tollo–Alexia Alluminio
- Casino–Ag2r
- Festina–Lotus
- Kelme–Costa Blanca
- Mapei–Bricobi
- Mercatone Uno–Bianchi
- Riso Scotti–MG Maglificio
- Ros Mary–Amica Chips
- Saeco–Cannondale
- Scrigno–Gaerne
- Team Polti
- TVM–Farm Frites
- Vini Caldirola
- Vitalicio Seguros

== Pre-race favourites ==
Several riders were considered to be potential contenders for the victory before the race began. These included the winners of the previous two editions, Ivan Gotti (Saeco–Cannondale) and Pavel Tonkov (Mapei–Bricobi). Alex Zülle (Festina–Lotus), who had won the Vuelta a España in both 1996 and 1997, was also considered a strong challenger. Marco Pantani (Mercatone Uno–Bianchi) had come back to the Giro the previous year from injury, only to retire after a crash which occurred when a cat ran into the peloton. He went on to win two stages of the 1997 Tour de France and was therefore also a challenger at the 1998 Giro.

== Route and stages ==
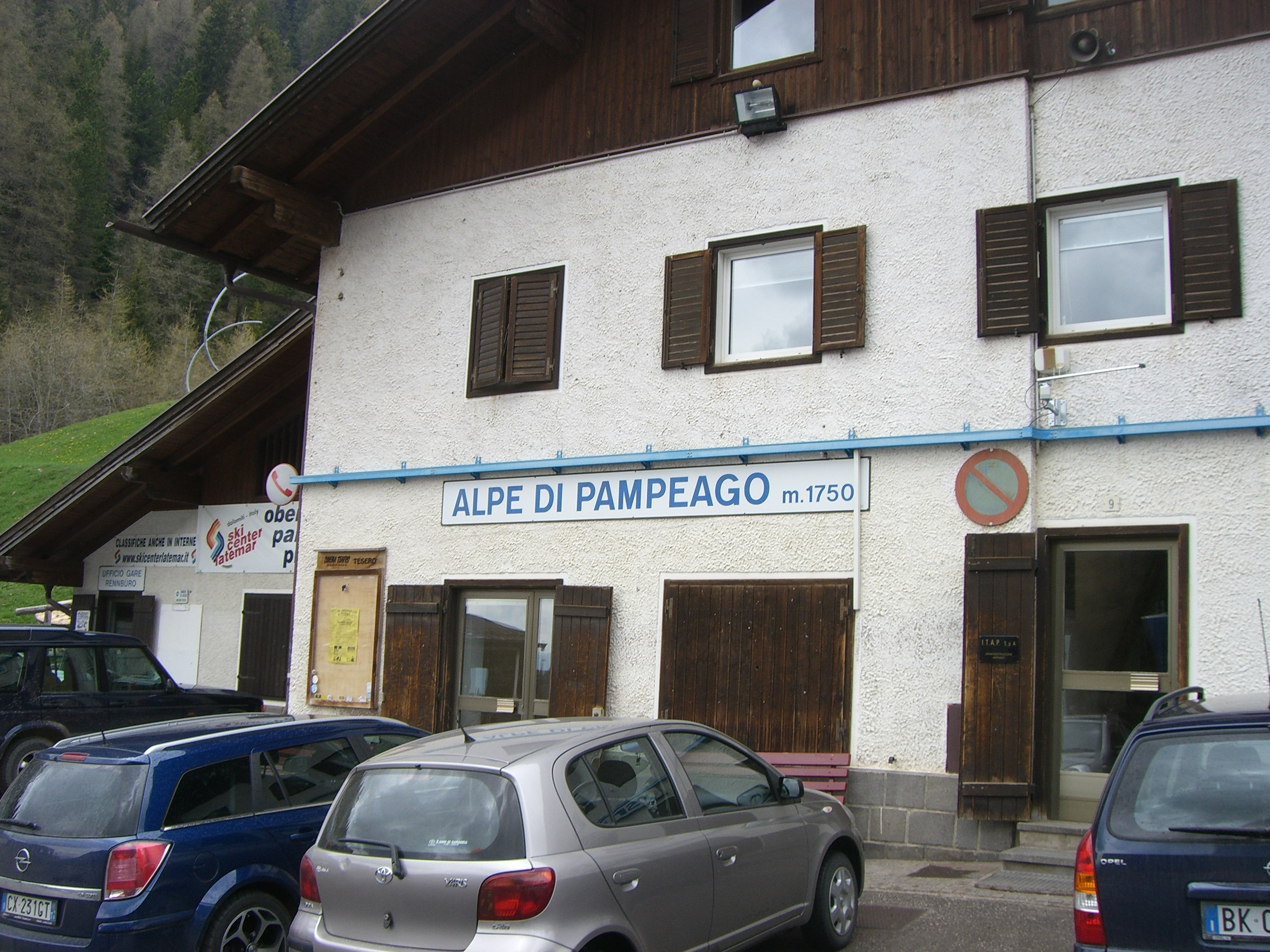
Passo di Pampeago hosted the end of the 115 km (71 mi) eighteenth stage.

The route for the 1998 Giro d'Italia was unveiled by race director Carmine Castellano on 22 November 1997 in Milan. It contained three time trial events, all of which were individual. There were eleven stages containing high mountains, of which four had summit finishes: stage 11, to San Marino; stage 14, to Piancavallo; stage 18, to Passo di Pampeago; and stage 19, to Plan di Montecampione. The organizers chose to include no rest days. When compared to the previous year's race, the race was 82 km (51 mi) shorter, contained the one less rest day, as well as one more individual time trial. After a five-year absence, RAI broadcast the event, replacing Reti Televisive Italiane (RTI) who had shown the race since 1993.

There were a total of seven stages that started outside Italy. The 1998 Giro d'Italia began with a prologue around the French city of Nice, which also served as the start for the race's first stage. Stage 11 finished in San Marino and the twelfth stage began there as well. The Giro's twentieth stage ended in Mendrisio. Stage 21 began in Mendrisio ended in Lugano, which also served as the start for stage 22.

Stage characteristics and winners
Stage	Date	Course	Distance	Type	Winner
P	16 May	Nice (France)	8 km (5 mi)	Individual time trial	Alex Zülle (SUI)
1	17 May	Nice (France) to Cuneo	159 km (99 mi)	Stage with mountain(s)	Mariano Piccoli (ITA)
2	18 May	Alba to Imperia	160 km (99 mi)	Stage with mountain(s)	Ángel Edo (ESP)
3	19 May	Rapallo to Forte dei Marmi	196 km (122 mi)	Plain stage	Nicola Minali (ITA)
4	20 May	Viareggio to Monte Argentario	239 km (149 mi)	Stage with mountain(s)	Nicola Miceli (ITA)
5	21 May	Orbetello to Frascati	206 km (128 mi)	Plain stage	Mario Cipollini (ITA)
6	22 May	Maddaloni to Lago Laceno	158 km (98 mi)	Stage with mountain(s)	Alex Zülle (SUI)
7	23 May	Montella to Matera	238 km (148 mi)	Stage with mountain(s)	Mario Cipollini (ITA)
8	24 May	Matera to Lecce	191 km (119 mi)	Plain stage	Mario Cipollini (ITA)
9	25 May	Foggia to Vasto	167 km (104 mi)	Plain stage	Glenn Magnusson (SWE)
10	26 May	Vasto to Macerata	212 km (132 mi)	Plain stage	Mario Cipollini (ITA)
11	27 May	Macerata to San Marino (San Marino)	220 km (137 mi)	Stage with mountain(s)	Andrea Noè (ITA)
12	28 May	San Marino (San Marino) to Carpi	202 km (126 mi)	Plain stage	Laurent Roux (FRA)
13	29 May	Carpi to Schio	166 km (103 mi)	Stage with mountain(s)	Michele Bartoli (ITA)
14	30 May	Schio to Piancavallo	165 km (103 mi)	Plain stage	Marco Pantani (ITA)
15	31 May	Trieste	40 km (25 mi)	Individual time trial	Alex Zülle (SUI)
16	1 June	Udine to Asiago	227 km (141 mi)	Stage with mountain(s)	Fabiano Fontanelli (ITA)
17	2 June	Asiago to Sëlva	217 km (135 mi)	Stage with mountain(s)	Giuseppe Guerini (ITA)
18	3 June	Sëlva to Passo di Pampeago	115 km (71 mi)	Stage with mountain(s)	Pavel Tonkov (RUS)
19	4 June	Cavalese to Plan di Montecampione	239 km (149 mi)	Stage with mountain(s)	Marco Pantani (ITA)
20	5 June	Darfo Boario Terme to Mendrisio (Switzerland)	137 km (85 mi)	Plain stage	Gian Matteo Fagnini (ITA)
21	6 June	Mendrisio (Switzerland) to Lugano (Switzerland)	34 km (21 mi)	Individual time trial	Serhiy Honchar (UKR)
22	7 June	Lugano (Switzerland) to Milan	173 km (107 mi)	Plain stage	Gian Matteo Fagnini (ITA)
	Total		3,830 km (2,380 mi)		

== Race overview ==
The race started in the French city of Nice with a prologue time trial, which was won by Zülle, who established an early lead over his general classification rivals. Pantani was aggressive from the early stages on, including an attack at the Capo Berta climb during stage 2. However, the first road stages saw race victories by sprinters, before Zülle took another victory on stage 7, at the ski resort of Laceno.

On stage 14 to Piancavallo, Pantani was victorious, but only took out 13 seconds on Zülle and Tonkov. On the next day, a long time trial in Trieste, Zülle caught Pantani on the road and finished 3:26 minutes faster, gaining a stronger grip on the race leader's jersey.

Pantani however still remained convinced that he could win the race, considering that three stages in high mountains lay ahead, a terrain that favoured him. On stage 17 into Sëlva, Pantani attacked with Giuseppe Guerini (Team Polti) on the climb of the Marmolada. Zülle cracked and lost four minutes, while Pantani, who gave the stage win to Guerini, took the leader's pink jersey. Tonkov hit back by winning the following stage at Alpe di Pampeago and now was just 27 seconds behind Pantani. Stage 19 to Montecampione saw Pantani and Tonkov engage in a fight for the victory on the final climb, while Zülle lost more than thirty minutes on both riders. Pantani was eventually able to leave Tonkov behind, winning the stage and exceeding his advantage to 1:27 minutes. The race had to be decided during the final time trial from Mendrisio to Lugano. Originally considered the weaker time trialist, Pantani managed to pull out another five seconds on Tonkov and sealed his victory in the Giro d'Italia. Serhiy Honchar won the stage, thirty seconds ahead of Pantani in third. Two months later, he also won the Tour de France, becoming only the seventh rider to win both races in the same year.

== Classification leadership ==
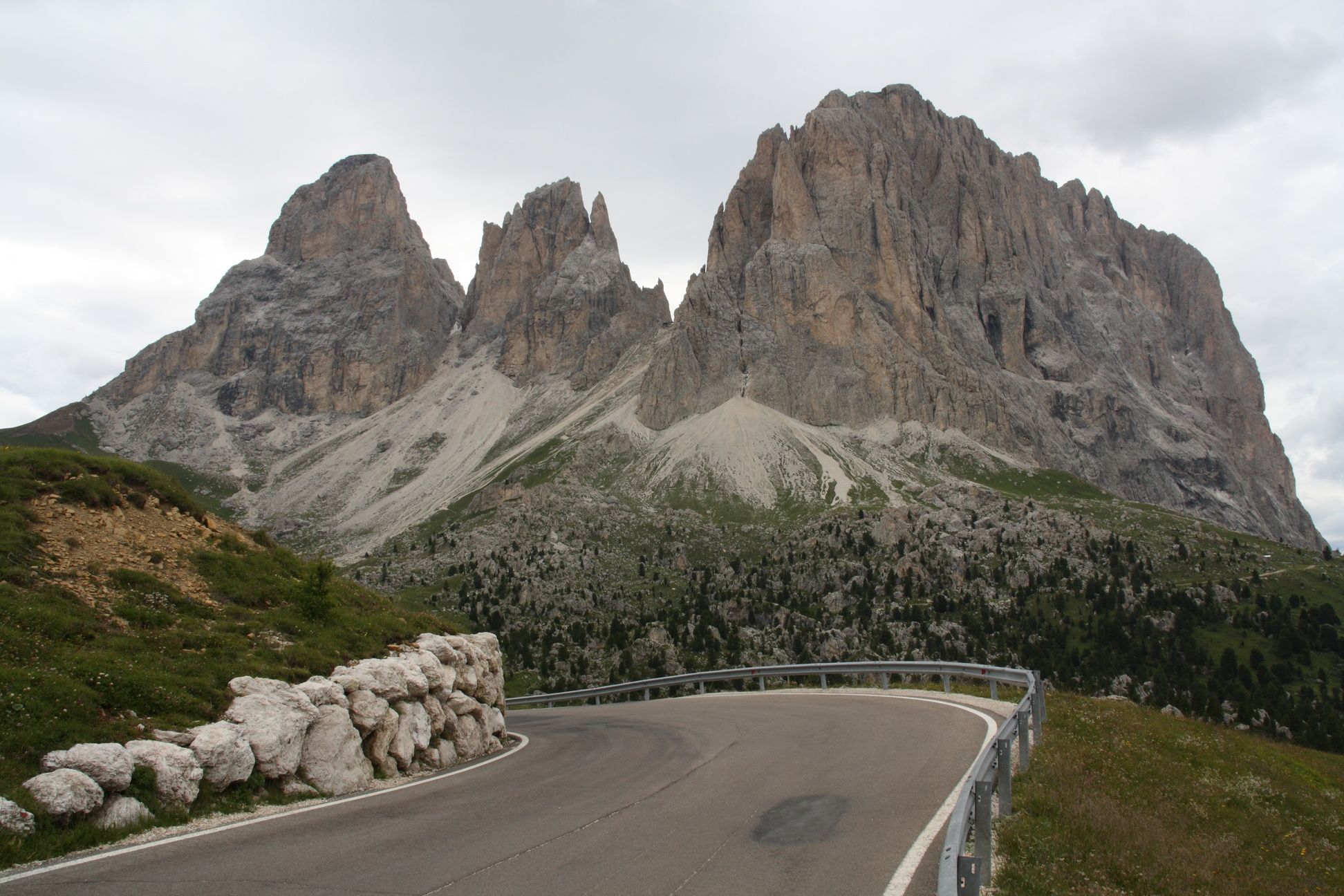
The Passo Sella was the Cima Coppi for the 1998 edition of the Giro.

Four different jerseys were worn during the 1998 Giro d'Italia. The leader of the general classification – calculated by adding the stage finish times of each rider, and allowing time bonuses for the first three finishers on mass-start stages – wore a pink jersey. This classification is the most important of the race, and its winner is considered as the winner of the Giro.

For the points classification, which awarded a purple (or cyclamen) jersey to its leader, cyclists were given points for finishing a stage in the top 15; additional points could also be won in intermediate sprints. The green jersey was awarded to the mountains classification leader. In this ranking, points were won by reaching the summit of a climb ahead of other cyclists. Each climb was ranked as either first, second or third category, with more points available for higher category climbs. The Cima Coppi, the race's highest point of elevation, awarded more points than the other first category climbs. The Cima Coppi for this Giro was the Passo Sella and was first climbed by the Italian Marco Pantani. The intergiro classification was marked by a blue jersey. The calculation for the intergiro is similar to that of the general classification, in each stage there is a midway point that the riders pass through a point and where their time is stopped. As the race goes on, their times compiled and the person with the lowest time is the leader of the intergiro classification and wears the blue jersey. Although no jersey was awarded, there was also one classification for the teams, in which the stage finish times of the best three cyclists per team were added; the leading team was the one with the lowest total time.

The rows in the following table correspond to the jerseys awarded after that stage was run.

Stage	Winner	General classification	Points classification	Mountains classification	Intergiro classification	Trofeo Fast Team
P	Alex Zülle	Alex Zülle	no award	no award	no award	Mapei–Bricobi
1	Mariano Piccoli	Alex Zülle	Mariano Piccoli	Marzio Bruseghin	?	Mapei–Bricobi
2	Ángel Edo	Alex Zülle	Mariano Piccoli	Marzio Bruseghin	?	Mapei–Bricobi
3	Nicola Minali	Serhiy Honchar	Mariano Piccoli	Paolo Bettini	?	Mapei–Bricobi
4	Nicola Miceli	Serhiy Honchar	Mariano Piccoli	Paolo Bettini	Fabrizio Guidi	Mapei–Bricobi
5	Mario Cipollini	Michele Bartoli	Michele Bartoli	Paolo Bettini	?	Mapei–Bricobi
6	Alex Zülle	Alex Zülle	Michele Bartoli	Alex Zülle	Gian Matteo Fagnini	Team Polti
7	Mario Cipollini	Alex Zülle	Michele Bartoli	Paolo Bettini	Gian Matteo Fagnini	Team Polti
8	Mario Cipollini	Alex Zülle	Michele Bartoli	Paolo Bettini	Gian Matteo Fagnini	Team Polti
9	Glenn Magnusson	Alex Zülle	Michele Bartoli	Paolo Bettini	Gian Matteo Fagnini	Team Polti
10	Mario Cipollini	Alex Zülle	Michele Bartoli	Paolo Bettini	Gian Matteo Fagnini	Team Polti
11	Andrea Noè	Alex Zülle	Michele Bartoli	Paolo Bettini	Gian Matteo Fagnini	Team Polti
12	Laurent Roux	Laurent Roux	Michele Bartoli	Paolo Bettini	Gian Matteo Fagnini	Team Polti
13	Michele Bartoli	Andrea Noè	Michele Bartoli	Paolo Bettini	Gian Matteo Fagnini	Team Polti
14	Marco Pantani	Alex Zülle	Michele Bartoli	Marco Pantani	Gian Matteo Fagnini	Team Polti
15	Alex Zülle	Alex Zülle	Michele Bartoli	Marco Pantani	Gian Matteo Fagnini	Mapei–Bricobi
16	Fabiano Fontanelli	Alex Zülle	Michele Bartoli	Marco Pantani	Gian Matteo Fagnini	Team Polti
17	Giuseppe Guerini	Marco Pantani	Mariano Piccoli	Marco Pantani	Gian Matteo Fagnini	Mercatone Uno–Bianchi
18	Pavel Tonkov	Marco Pantani	Mariano Piccoli	Marco Pantani	Gian Matteo Fagnini	Mercatone Uno–Bianchi
19	Marco Pantani	Marco Pantani	Mariano Piccoli	Marco Pantani	Gian Matteo Fagnini	Mapei–Bricobi
20	Gian Matteo Fagnini	Marco Pantani	Mariano Piccoli	Marco Pantani	Gian Matteo Fagnini	Mapei–Bricobi
21	Serhiy Honchar	Marco Pantani	Mariano Piccoli	Marco Pantani	Gian Matteo Fagnini	Mapei–Bricobi
22	Gian Matteo Fagnini	Marco Pantani	Mariano Piccoli	Marco Pantani	Gian Matteo Fagnini	Mapei–Bricobi
Final		Marco Pantani	Mariano Piccoli	Marco Pantani	Gian Matteo Fagnini	Mapei–Bricobi

== Final standings ==
Legend
Pink jersey	Denotes the winner of the General classification	Green jersey	Denotes the winner of the Mountains classification
Purple jersey	Denotes the winner of the Points classification	Blue jersey	Denotes the winner of the Intergiro classification

=== General classification ===
	Rider	Team	Time
1	Marco Pantani (ITA)	Mercatone Uno–Bianchi	98h 48' 32"
2	Pavel Tonkov (RUS)	Mapei–Bricobi	+ 1' 33"
3	Giuseppe Guerini (ITA)	Team Polti	+ 6' 51"
4	Oscar Camenzind (SUI)	Mapei–Bricobi	+ 12' 16"
5	Daniel Clavero (ESP)	Vitalicio Seguros	+ 18' 04"
6	Gianni Faresin (ITA)	Mapei–Bricobi	+ 18' 31"
7	Paolo Bettini (ITA)	Asics-C.G.A.	+ 21' 03"
8	Daniele De Paoli (ITA)	Ros Mary-Amica Chips	+ 21' 35"
9	Paolo Savoldelli (ITA)	Saeco–Cannondale	+ 25' 54"
10	Serhiy Honchar (UKR)	Cantina Tollo-Alexia Alluminio	+ 25' 58"

=== Points classification ===
	Rider	Team	Points
1	Mariano Piccoli (ITA)	Brescialat-Liquigas	194
2	Marco Pantani (ITA)	Mercatone Uno–Bianchi	158
3	Gian Matteo Fagnini (ITA)	Saeco–Cannondale	156
4	Pavel Tonkov (RUS)	Mapei–Bricobi	140
5	Alex Zülle (SUI)	Festina–Lotus	117
6	Giuseppe Guerini (ITA)	Team Polti	107
7	Nicola Loda (ITA)	Ballan	90
8	Massimo Strazzer (ITA)	Cantina Tollo-Alexia Alluminio	76
9	Davide Rebellin (ITA)	Team Polti	72
10	Oscar Camenzind (SUI)	Mapei–Bricobi	70

=== Mountains classification ===
	Rider	Team	Points
1	Marco Pantani (ITA)	Mercatone Uno–Bianchi	89
2	Chepe González (COL)	Kelme–Costa Blanca	62
3	Pavel Tonkov (RUS)	Mapei–Bricobi	49
4	Alex Zülle (SUI)	Festina–Lotus	37
5	Paolo Bettini (ITA)	Asics-C.G.A.	30
6	Giuseppe Guerini (ITA)	Team Polti	23
7	Mariano Piccoli (ITA)	Brescialat-Liquigas	22
8	Andrea Noé (ITA)	Asics-C.G.A.	17
9	Leonardo Calzavara (ITA)	Vini Caldirola	15
10	Herman Buenahora (COL)	Vitalicio Seguros	10

=== Intergiro classification ===
	Rider	Team	Time
1	Gian Matteo Fagnini (ITA)	Saeco–Cannondale	62h 32' 12"
2	Mariano Piccoli (ITA)	Brescialat-Liquigas	+ 55"
3	Nicola Loda (ITA)	Ballan	+ 2' 29"

=== Trofeo Fast Team classification ===
	Team	Time
1	Mapei–Bricobi	296h 17' 54"
2	Mercatone Uno–Bianchi	+ 17' 11"
3	Saeco–Cannondale	+ 50' 22"
4	Team Polti	+ 1h 05' 41"
5	Vitalicio Seguros	+ 1h 10' 45"
6	Kelme–Costa Blanca	+ 1h 16' 45"
7	Asics-C.G.A.	+ 1h 29' 36"
8	Riso Scotti-MG Maglificio	+ 1h 48' 29"
9	Festina–Lotus	+ 1h 59' 48"
10	Cantina Tollo-Alexia Alluminio	+ 2h 04' 19"

=== Trofeo Super Team classification ===
	Team	Points
1	Team Polti	479
2	Mapei–Bricobi	469
3	Mercatone Uno–Bianchi	384
4	Asics-C.G.A.	373
5	Saeco–Cannondale	325
6	Vitalicio Seguros	290
7	Kelme–Costa Blanca	284
8	Riso Scotti-MG Maglificio	274
9	Cantina Tollo-Alexia Alluminio	268
10	Brescialat-Liquigas	253
