= 1998 Clásica de San Sebastián =

Race details
- Dates: 8 August 1998
- Stages: 1
- Distance: 232 km (144.2 mi)
- Winning time: 5h 43' 45"

Results
	Winner	Francesco Casagrande (ITA)	(Cofidis)
	Second	Axel Merckx (BEL)	(Team Polti)
	Third	Leonardo Piepoli (ITA)	(Saeco–Cannondale)

The 1998 Clásica de San Sebastián was the 18th edition of the Clásica de San Sebastián cycle race and was held on 8 August 1998. The race started and finished in San Sebastián. The race was won by Francesco Casagrande of the Cofidis team.

== General classification ==
Final general classification

Rank	Rider	Team	Time
1	Francesco Casagrande (ITA)	Cofidis	5h 43' 45"
2	Axel Merckx (BEL)	Team Polti	+ 0"
3	Leonardo Piepoli (ITA)	Saeco–Cannondale	+ 2"
4	Andrea Tafi (ITA)	Mapei–Bricobi	+ 1' 15"
5	Daniele Nardello (ITA)	Mapei–Bricobi	+ 1' 15"
6	Max Sciandri (GBR)	Française des Jeux	+ 1' 20"
7	Ángel Casero (ESP)	Vitalicio Seguros	+ 1' 20"
8	Léon van Bon (NED)	Rabobank	+ 1' 43"
9	Udo Bölts (GER)	Team Telekom	+ 1' 43"
10	Giuseppe Di Grande (ITA)	Mapei–Bricobi	+ 1' 43"
