= 1998 Paris–Tours =

Race details
- Dates: 4 October 1998
- Stages: 1
- Distance: 254 km (157.8 mi)
- Winning time: 5h 45' 14"

Results
| | Winner | Jacky Durand (FRA) | (Casino–Ag2r) |
| | Second | Mirco Gualdi (ITA) | (Team Polti) |
| | Third | Jaan Kirsipuu (EST) | (Casino–Ag2r) |

The 1998 Paris–Tours was the 92nd edition of the Paris–Tours cycle race and was held on 4 October 1998. The race started in Saint-Arnoult-en-Yvelines and finished in Tours. The race was won by Jacky Durand of the Casino team.

== General classification ==
Final general classification

| Rank | Rider | Team | Time |
|---|---|---|---|
| 1 | Jacky Durand (FRA) | Casino–Ag2r | 5h 45' 14" |
| 2 | Mirco Gualdi (ITA) | Team Polti | + 2" |
| 3 | Jaan Kirsipuu (EST) | Casino–Ag2r | + 31" |
| 4 | Stefano Zanini (ITA) | Mapei–Bricobi | + 31" |
| 5 | Nicola Minali (ITA) | Riso Scotti–MG Maglificio | + 31" |
| 6 | Max van Heeswijk (NED) | Rabobank | + 31" |
| 7 | Alessandro Bertolini (ITA) | Cofidis | + 31" |
| 8 | Jo Planckaert (BEL) | Lotto–Mobistar | + 31" |
| 9 | André Korff (GER) | Festina–Lotus | + 31" |
| 10 | Jean-Patrick Nazon (FRA) | Française des Jeux | + 32" |
