= Daniele De Paoli =

Italian cyclist

Daniele de Paoli
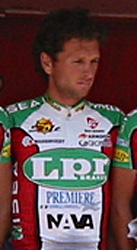
- De Paoli at the 2005 Euskal Bizikleta

Personal information
- Born: 8 December 1973 (age 52) Pavia, Italy

Cycling career
- Sport: Cycling
- Discipline: Road
- Role: Rider

Professional teams
- 1997–1999: Ros Mary–Minotti Italia–Ideal
- 2000–2001: Mercatone Uno–Albacom
- 2002: Alessio
- 2005–2006: LPR–Piacenza

Daniele de Paoli (born 8 December 1973) is an Italian former professional racing cyclist. He rode in six editions of the Giro d'Italia.

== Major results ==
1996
2nd Overall Tour de Liège

1st Stages 2 & 7

3rd Gran Premio Industria e Commercio Artigianato Carnaghese
3rd Ruota d'Oro
1998
7th Giro dell'Appennino
8th Overall Giro d'Italia
1999
3rd Giro dell'Appennino
8th Overall Giro d'Italia
2000
1st Giro d'Abruzzo
3rd Tre Valli Varesine
8th Klasika Primavera
9th Züri-Metzgete
2001
1st Stage 7 Volta a Catalunya
3rd Road race, National Road Championships
3rd Trofeo Matteotti
5th Subida a Urkiola
2006
1st Giro del Mendrisiotto

=== Grand Tour general classification results timeline ===
Grand Tour	1997	1998	1999	2000	2001	2002
Giro d'Italia	29	8	8	36	21	32
Tour de France	—	—	—	—	—	—
Vuelta a España	—	—	DNF	—	DNF	—
