= Germano Pierdomenico =

Italian cyclist

Personal information
- Born: 12 June 1967 (age 59) Torrevecchia Teatina, Italy

Cycling career
- Sport: Cycling
- Current team: Retired
- Discipline: Road
- Role: Rider

Professional teams
- 1990–1991: Gis Gelati–Benotto
- 1992–1994: Mercatone Uno–Medeghini–Zucchini
- 1995: Amore & Vita–Galatron
- 1996–2000: Cantina Tollo–Co.Bo.

Germano Pierdomenico (born 12 June 1967) is an Italian former professional racing cyclist.

== Major results ==
1989
1st Coppa Fiera di Mercatale
1991
3rd Giro della Provincia di Reggio Calabria
1992
1st Stage 1 Grand Prix Guillaume Tell
1995
1st Stage 13 Herald Sun Tour
1996
6th GP Ouest–France
1997
3rd Route Adélie
9th Overall Giro di Sardegna
1998
2nd Brabantse Pijl
2nd Giro di Romagna
3rd GP Chiasso
6th Amstel Gold Race
6th Overall Tirreno–Adriatico
9th Paris–Bruxelles

=== Grand Tour general classification results timeline ===
Grand Tour	1991	1992	1993	1994	1995	1996	1997	1998
Giro d'Italia	39	68	—	—	—	—	36	DNF
Tour de France	—	—	—	—	—	—	—	—
Vuelta a España	—	—	DNF	—	—	DNF	—	—

Legend
—	Did not compete
DNF	Did not finish
