= Giuseppe Di Grande =

Italian cyclist

Personal information
- Full name: Giuseppe Di Grande
- Born: 7 September 1973 (age 53) Syracuse, Sicily

Cycling career
- Sport: Cycling
- Current team: Retired
- Discipline: Road
- Role: Rider

Amateur team
- 1995: Mapei–GB–Latexco (stagiaire)

Professional teams
- 1996–1999: Mapei–GB
- 2000: Festina
- 2001: Tacconi Sport–Vini Caldirola
- 2002: Index–Alexia Alluminio
- 2004: Formaggi Pinzolo Fiavè
- 2005: Universal Caffé–Styloffice
- 2006–2007: Miche

Major wins
- Grand Tours Giro d'Italia 1 individual stage (1997)

Giuseppe Di Grande (born 7 September 1973) is an Italian former professional road cyclist.

In the 2001 Giro d'Italia, Di Grande was caught doping. He was also suspended in 2006 for six months. In 2003, he did not race because of a depression.

== Major results ==
1994
6th Overall Giro Ciclistico d'Italia
1995
1st Overall Giro Ciclistico d'Italia
1997
Settimana Ciclistica Lombarda

1st Stages 5 & 7

1st Stage 1 Tour de Romandie
3rd Tour de Berne
5th Rund um den Henninger Turm
7th Overall Giro d'Italia

1st Stage 12

1998
2nd Tre Valli Varesine
9th Overall Tour de France
10th Clásica de San Sebastián
2000
3rd Overall Setmana Catalana de Ciclisme
2001
4th Giro dell'Appennino
9th Overall Settimana Ciclistica Internazionale Coppi-Bartali
2002
7th Tre Valli Varesine
8th Overall Tour de Suisse
2004
9th Overall Giro del Trentino
2005
8th Overall Vuelta a Asturias
10th Trofeo Città di Castelfidardo
2006
3rd Giro dell'Emilia

=== Grand Tour general classification results timeline ===
| Grand Tour | 1996 | 1997 | 1998 | 1999 | 2000 | 2001 | 2002 | 2003 | 2004 |
|---|---|---|---|---|---|---|---|---|---|
| / Vuelta a España | — | — | DNF | — | DNF | — | DNF | — | — |
| Giro d'Italia | 26 | 7 | — | 17 | — | DNF | — | — | 20 |
| Tour de France | — | — | 9 | — | — | — | — | — | — |

Legend
| — | Did not compete |
| DNF | Did not finish |
