= Bruno Boscardin =

Swiss cyclist

Personal information
- Born: 2 February 1970 (age 56) Le Grand-Saconnex, Switzerland

Cycling career
- Sport: Cycling
- Current team: Retired
- Discipline: Road
- Role: Rider

Amateur team
- 1992: Carrera Jeans (stagiaire)

Professional teams
- 1993–1994: Gatorade
- 1995–1998: Festina–Lotus
- 1999–2000: Post Swiss Team

Bruno Boscardin (born 2 February 1970 in Le Grand-Saconnex) is a former Swiss racing cyclist. He held an Italian citizenship, and was naturalized as Swiss in 1997.

== Major results ==
1994
1st stage 1 Hofbrau Cup
1996
1st Tour du Haut Var
1st stage 7 Paris–Nice
1997
1st stage 4 Tour du Limousin
1999
1st Tour du Lac Léman
1st stage 3 Setmana Catalana de Ciclisme
