= 1997 Giro d'Italia =

Race details
- Dates: 17 May — 8 June 1997
- Stages: 22
- Distance: 3,912 km (2,431 mi)
- Winning time: 102h 53' 58"

Results
Jersey awarded to the overall winner	Winner	Ivan Gotti (ITA)	(Saeco–Estro)
	Second	Pavel Tonkov (RUS)	(Mapei–GB)
	Third	Giuseppe Guerini (ITA)	(Team Polti)
Jersey awarded to the points classification winner	Points	Mario Cipollini (ITA)	(Saeco–Estro)
Jersey awarded to the mountains classification winner	Mountains	Chepe González (COL)	(Kelme–Costa Blanca)
Jersey awarded to the intergiro classification winner	Intergiro	Dimitri Konyshev (RUS)	(Roslotto–ZG Mobili)
	Team	Kelme–Costa Blanca	
	Team points	Saeco–Estro	

The 1997 Giro d'Italia was the 80th edition of the Giro. It began on 17 May with a mass-start stage that began and ended in Venice. The race came to a close on 8 June with a mass-start stage that ended in the Italian city of Milan. Eighteen teams entered the race that was won by the Italian Ivan Gotti of the Saeco–Estro team. Second and third were the Russian rider Pavel Tonkov and Italian Giuseppe Guerini.

In the race's other classifications, Kelme–Costa Blanca rider Chepe González won the mountains classification, Mario Cipollini of the Saeco team won the points classification, and Roslotto–ZG Mobili rider Dimitri Konyshev won the intergiro classification. Kelme – Costa Blanca finished as the winners of the Trofeo Fast Team classification, ranking each of the eighteen teams contesting the race by lowest cumulative time. The other team classification, the Trofeo Super Team classification, where the teams' riders are awarded points for placing within the top twenty in each stage and the points are then totaled for each team was won by Saeco.

== Teams ==
Eighteen teams were invited by the race organizers to participate in the 1997 edition of the Giro d'Italia. Each team sent a squad of ten riders, which meant that the race started with a peloton of 180 cyclists. From the riders that began the race, 110 made it to the finish in Milan.

The eighteen teams that took part in the race were:

- Aki–Safi
- Amore & Vita–ForzArcore
- Asics–CGA
- Batik–Del Monte
- Brescialat–Oyster
- Cantina Tollo–Carrier–Starplast
- Festina–Lotus
- Kelme–Costa Blanca
- Kross–Montanari–Selle Italia
- Mapei–GB
- Mercatone Uno
- MG Maglificio–Technogym
- Refin–Mobilvetta
- Roslotto–ZG Mobili
- Ros Mary–Minotti Italia–Ideal
- Saeco–Estro
- Scrigno–Gaerne
- Team Polti

== Route and stages ==
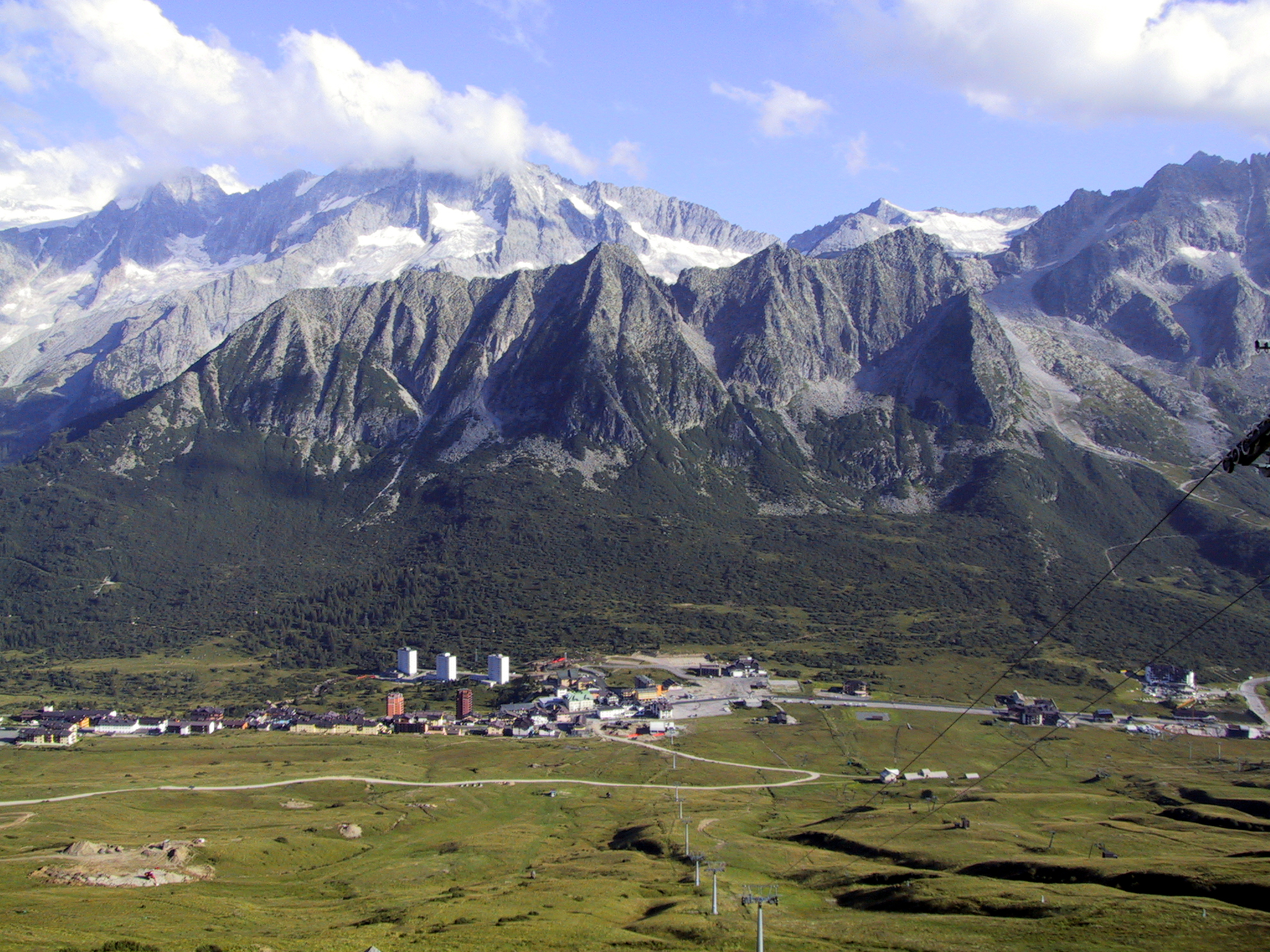
The Passo del Tonale (pictured) was the finish for the 176 km (109 mi) stage 20.

The route for the 1997 Giro d'Italia was unveiled by race director Carmine Castellano on 9 November 1996 in Milan. It contained two time trial events, all of which were individual. There were ten stages containing high mountains, of which three had summit finishes: stage 5, to Monte Terminillo; stage 14, to Breuil-Cervinia; and stage 20, to Passo del Tonale. The organizers chose to include one rest day. When compared to the previous year's race, the race was 78 km (48 mi) shorter, contained the same amount of rest days and stages, as well as one more individual time trial.

List of stages
Stage	Date	Course	Distance	Type	Winner
1	17 May	Venezia to Venezia	128 km (80 mi)	Plain stage	Mario Cipollini (ITA)
2	18 May	Mestre to Cervia	211 km (131 mi)	Plain stage	Mario Cipollini (ITA)
3	19 May	Santarcangelo di Romagna to San Marino (San Marino)	18 km (11 mi)	Individual time trial	Pavel Tonkov (RUS)
4	20 May	San Marino (San Marino) to Arezzo	156 km (97 mi)	Plain stage	Mario Cipollini (ITA)
5	21 May	Arezzo to Monte Terminillo	215 km (134 mi)	Stage with mountain(s)	Pavel Tonkov (RUS)
6	22 May	Rieti to Lanciano	210 km (130 mi)	Stage with mountain(s)	Roberto Sgambelluri (ITA)
7	23 May	Lanciano to Mondragone	210 km (130 mi)	Stage with mountain(s)	Marcel Wüst (GER)
8	24 May	Mondragone to Cava de' Tirreni	212 km (132 mi)	Plain stage	Mario Manzoni (ITA)
9	25 May	Cava de' Tirreni to Castrovillari	232 km (144 mi)	Stage with mountain(s)	Dimitri Konyshev (RUS)
10	26 May	Castrovillari to Taranto	195 km (121 mi)	Plain stage	Mario Cipollini (ITA)
	27 May	Rest day			
11	28 May	Lido di Camaiore to Lido di Camaiore	155 km (96 mi)	Plain stage	Gabriele Missaglia (ITA)
12	29 May	La Spezia to Varazze	214 km (133 mi)	Stage with mountain(s)	Giuseppe Di Grande (ITA)
13	30 May	Varazze to Cuneo	150 km (93 mi)	Plain stage	Glenn Magnusson (SWE)
14	31 May	Racconigi to Breuil-Cervinia	240 km (149 mi)	Stage with mountain(s)	Ivan Gotti (ITA)
15	1 June	Verrès to Borgomanero	173 km (107 mi)	Stage with mountain(s)	Alessandro Baronti (ITA)
16	2 June	Borgomanero to Dalmine	158 km (98 mi)	Plain stage	Fabiano Fontanelli (ITA)
17	3 June	Dalmine to Verona	200 km (124 mi)	Plain stage	Mirco Gualdi (ITA)
18	4 June	Baselga di Pinè to Cavalese	40 km (25 mi)	Individual time trial	Serhiy Honchar (UKR)
19	5 June	Predazzo to Pfalzen	222 km (138 mi)	Stage with mountain(s)	José Luis Rubiera (ESP)
20	6 June	Bruneck to Passo del Tonale	176 km (109 mi)	Stage with mountain(s)	José Jaime González (COL)
21	7 June	Malè to Edolo	238 km (148 mi)	Stage with mountain(s)	Pavel Tonkov (RUS)
22	8 June	Boario Terme to Milan	165 km (103 mi)	Plain stage	Mario Cipollini (ITA)
	Total		3,889 km (2,417 mi)		

== Classification leadership ==
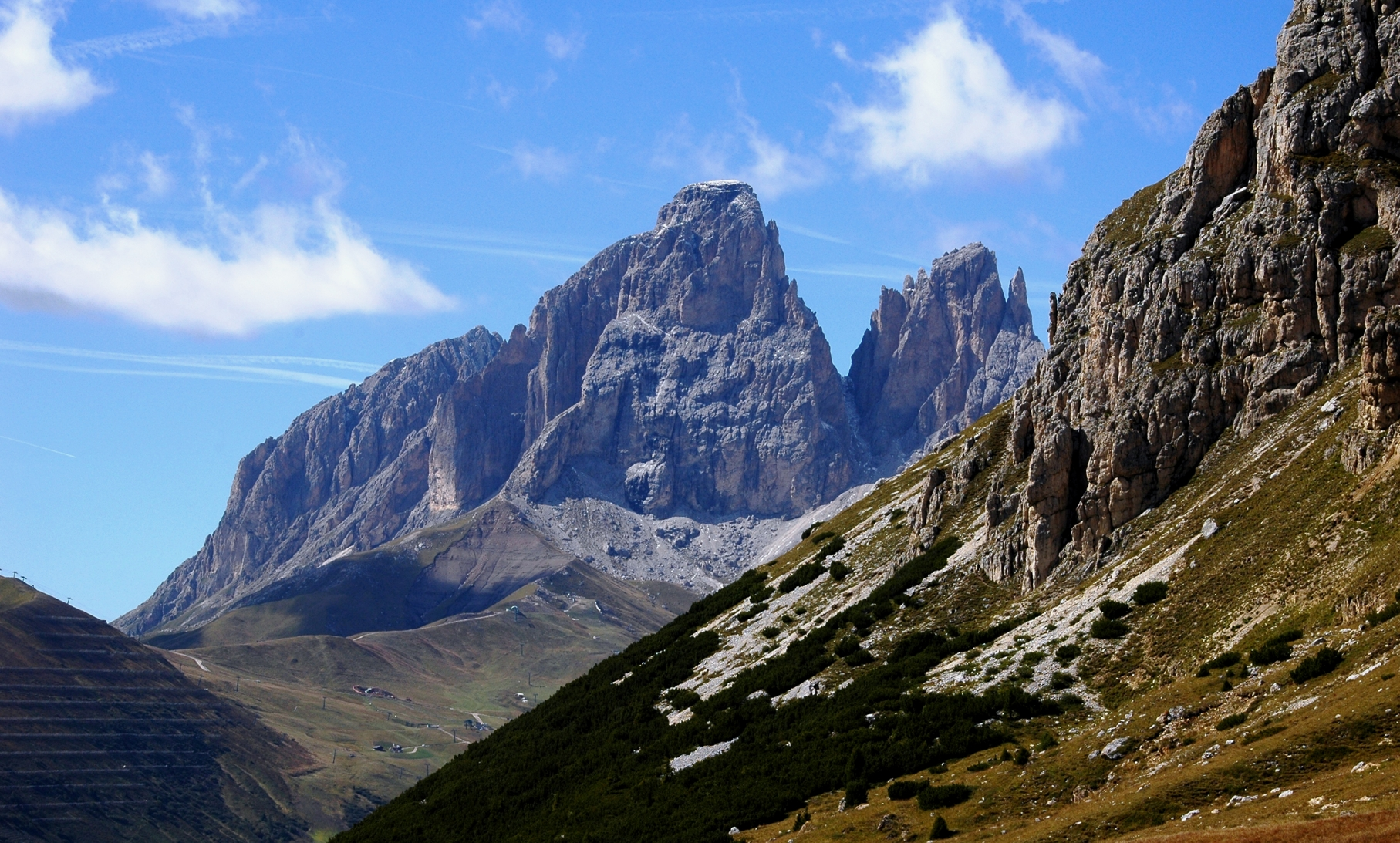
The Pordoi Pass was the Cima Coppi for the 1997 running of the Giro d'Italia.

Four different jerseys were worn during the 1997 Giro d'Italia. The leader of the general classification – calculated by adding the stage finish times of each rider, and allowing time bonuses for the first three finishers on mass-start stages – wore a pink jersey. This classification is the most important of the race, and its winner is considered as the winner of the Giro.

For the points classification, which awarded a purple (or cyclamen) jersey to its leader, cyclists were given points for finishing a stage in the top 15; additional points could also be won in intermediate sprints. The green jersey was awarded to the mountains classification leader. In this ranking, points were won by reaching the summit of a climb ahead of other cyclists. Each climb was ranked as either first, second or third category, with more points available for higher category climbs. The Cima Coppi, the race's highest point of elevation, awarded more points than the other first category climbs. The Cima Coppi for this Giro was the Pordoi Pass and was first climbed by the Colombian José Jaime González. The intergiro classification was marked by a blue jersey. The calculation for the intergiro is similar to that of the general classification, in each stage there is a midway point that the riders pass through a point and where their time is stopped. As the race goes on, their times compiled and the person with the lowest time is the leader of the intergiro classification and wears the blue jersey. Although no jersey was awarded, there was also one classification for the teams, in which the stage finish times of the best three cyclists per team were added; the leading team was the one with the lowest total time.

The rows in the following table correspond to the jerseys awarded after that stage was run.

Classification leadership by stage
Stage	Winner	General classification	Points classification	Mountains classification	Intergiro classification	Trofeo Fast Team
1	Mario Cipollini	Mario Cipollini	Mario Cipollini	not awarded	Dimitri Konyshev	Saeco–Estro
2	Mario Cipollini	Mario Cipollini	Mario Cipollini	not awarded	Dimitri Konyshev	Saeco–Estro
3	Pavel Tonkov	Pavel Tonkov	Mario Cipollini	Pavel Tonkov	Dimitri Konyshev	Mapei–GB
4	Mario Cipollini	Pavel Tonkov	Mario Cipollini	Pavel Tonkov	Dimitri Konyshev	Mapei–GB
5	Pavel Tonkov	Pavel Tonkov	Mario Cipollini	Pavel Tonkov	Dimitri Konyshev	Saeco–Estro
6	Roberto Sgambelluri	Pavel Tonkov	Mario Cipollini	Pavel Tonkov	Dimitri Konyshev	Saeco–Estro
7	Marcel Wüst	Pavel Tonkov	Mario Cipollini	Pavel Tonkov	Dimitri Konyshev	Saeco–Estro
8	Mario Manzoni	Pavel Tonkov	Mario Cipollini	Mariano Piccoli	Dimitri Konyshev	Asics-C.G.A.
9	Dimitri Konyshev	Pavel Tonkov	Mario Cipollini	Mariano Piccoli	Dimitri Konyshev	Asics-C.G.A.
10	Mario Cipollini	Pavel Tonkov	Mario Cipollini	Mariano Piccoli	Dimitri Konyshev	Asics-C.G.A.
11	Gabriele Missaglia	Pavel Tonkov	Mario Cipollini	Mariano Piccoli	Dimitri Konyshev	Asics-C.G.A.
12	Giuseppe Di Grande	Pavel Tonkov	Mario Cipollini	Mariano Piccoli	Dimitri Konyshev	Asics-C.G.A.
13	Glenn Magnusson	Pavel Tonkov	Mario Cipollini	Mariano Piccoli	Dimitri Konyshev	Asics-C.G.A.
14	Ivan Gotti	Ivan Gotti	Mario Cipollini	José Jaime González	Dimitri Konyshev	Team Polti
15	Alessandro Baronti	Ivan Gotti	Mario Cipollini	José Jaime González	Dimitri Konyshev	Asics-C.G.A.
16	Fabiano Fontanelli	Ivan Gotti	Mario Cipollini	José Jaime González	Dimitri Konyshev	Asics-C.G.A.
17	Mirco Gualdi	Ivan Gotti	Mario Cipollini	José Jaime González	Dimitri Konyshev	Team Polti
18	Serhij Hončar	Ivan Gotti	Mario Cipollini	José Jaime González	Dimitri Konyshev	Team Polti
19	José Luis Rubiera	Ivan Gotti	Mario Cipollini	José Jaime González	Dimitri Konyshev	Kelme–Costa Blanca
20	José Jaime González	Ivan Gotti	Mario Cipollini	José Jaime González	Dimitri Konyshev	Kelme–Costa Blanca
21	Pavel Tonkov	Ivan Gotti	Mario Cipollini	José Jaime González	Dimitri Konyshev	Kelme–Costa Blanca
22	Mario Cipollini	Ivan Gotti	Mario Cipollini	José Jaime González	Dimitri Konyshev	Kelme–Costa Blanca
Final		Ivan Gotti	Mario Cipollini	José Jaime González	Dimitri Konyshev	Kelme–Costa Blanca

== Final standings ==
Legend
Pink jersey	Denotes the winner of the General classification	Green jersey	Denotes the winner of the Mountains classification
Purple jersey	Denotes the winner of the Points classification	Blue jersey	Denotes the winner of the Intergiro classification

=== General classification ===
	Rider	Team	Time
1	Ivan Gotti (ITA)	Saeco–Estro	102h 53' 58"
2	Pavel Tonkov (RUS)	Mapei–GB	+ 1' 27"
3	Giuseppe Guerini (ITA)	Team Polti	+ 7' 40"
4	Nicola Miceli (ITA)	Aki–Safi	+ 12' 20"
5	Serhiy Honchar (UKR)	Aki–Safi	+ 12' 44"
6	Wladimir Belli (ITA)	Brescialat–Oyster	+ 12' 48"
7	Giuseppe Di Grande (ITA)	Mapei–GB	+ 12' 54"
8	Marcos-Antonio Serrano (ESP)	Kelme–Costa Blanca	+ 16' 07"
9	Stefano Garzelli (ITA)	Mercatone Uno	+ 18' 08"
10	José Luis Rubiera (ESP)	Kelme–Costa Blanca	+ 18' 56"

=== Points classification ===
	Rider	Team	Points
1	Mario Cipollini (ITA)	Saeco–Estro	202
2	Dimitri Konyshev (RUS)	Roslotto–ZG Mobili	146
3	Glenn Magnusson (SWE)	Amore & Vita–ForzArcore	145
4	Pavel Tonkov (RUS)	Mapei–GB	121
5	Ivan Gotti (ITA)	Saeco–Estro	102
6	Mariano Piccoli (ITA)	Brescialat–Oyster	93
7	Marcel Wüst (GER)	Festina–Lotus	92
8	Chepe González (COL)	Kelme–Costa Blanca	81
9	Gabriele Missaglia (ITA)	Kelme–Costa Blanca	81
10	Evgeni Berzin (RUS)	Batik–Del Monte	74

=== Mountains classification ===
	Rider	Team	Points
1	Chepe González (COL)	Kelme–Costa Blanca	99
2	Mariano Piccoli (ITA)	Brescialat–Oyster	35
3	Roberto Conti (ITA)	Mercatone Uno	28
4	Pavel Tonkov (RUS)	Mapei–GB	24
5	Ivan Gotti (ITA)	Saeco–Estro	23
6	Dimitri Konyshev (RUS)	Roslotto–ZG Mobili	16
7	José Luis Rubiera (ESP)	Kelme–Costa Blanca	16
8	Andrea Noè (ITA)	Asics–CGA	15
9	Martin Hvastija (SLO)	Cantina Tollo–Carrier–Starplast	15
10	Paolo Savoldelli (ITA)	Roslotto–ZG Mobili	14

=== Intergiro classification ===
	Rider	Team	Time
1	Dimitri Konyshev (RUS)	Roslotto–ZG Mobili	52h 48' 18"
2	Mario Cipollini (ITA)	Saeco–Estro	+ 3' 01"
3	Glenn Magnusson (SWE)	Amore & Vita–ForzArcore	+ 3' 15"
4	Serhiy Honchar (UKR)	Aki–Safi	+ 3' 22"
5	Evgeni Berzin (RUS)	Batik–Del Monte	+ 3' 41"

=== Trofeo Fast Team classification ===
	Team	Time
1	Kelme–Costa Blanca	309h 26' 09"
2	Mapei–GB	+ 14' 07"
3	Saeco–Estro	+ 33' 18"
4	Mercatone Uno	+ 36' 21"
5	Aki–Safi	+ 40' 12"
6	Team Polti	+ 45' 39"
7	Asics–CGA	+ 1h 01' 25"
8	Roslotto–ZG Mobili	+ 1h 09' 24"
9	Brescialat–Oyster	+ 1h 19' 39"
10	Festina–Lotus	+ 1h 57' 47"

=== Trofeo Super Team classification ===
	Team	Points
1	Saeco–Estro	399
2	Mapei–GB	391
3	Team Polti	367
4	Roslotto–ZG Mobili	365
5	Aki–Safi	306
6	Kelme–Costa Blanca	304
7	MG Maglificio–Technogym	284
8	Brescialat–Oyster	283
9	Asics–CGA	280
10	Amore & Vita–ForzArcore	244
