= Glenn Magnusson =

Swedish cyclist

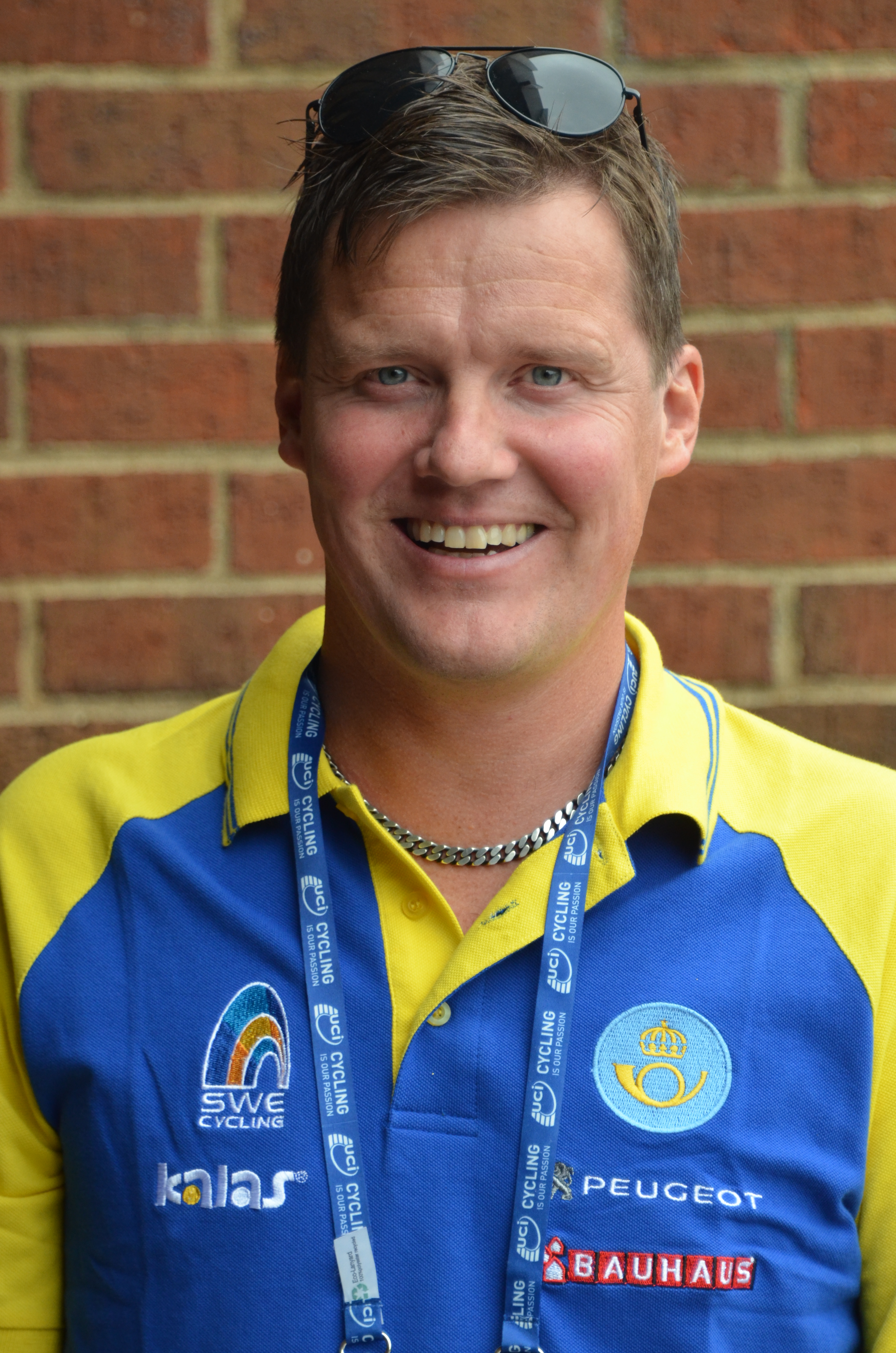
- Glenn Magnusson in 2015

Personal information
- Born: 5 July 1969 (age 57) Oskarshamn, Sweden

Cycling career
- Sport: Cycling
- Current team: Retired
- Discipline: Road
- Role: Rider

Professional teams
- 1996–1998: Amore & Vita–ForzArcore
- 1999: U.S. Postal Service
- 2000–2001: Farm Frites

Major wins
- Grand Tours Giro d'Italia 3 individual stages (1996, 1997, 1998) One-day races and Classics National Road Race Championships (1995)

Glenn Magnusson (born 5 July 1969) is a Swedish former professional road cyclist. He is most known for winning 3 stages of the Giro d'Italia. He also represented Sweden at the Olympics three times (1992, 1996, 2000).

== Major results ==
1987
1st Road race, National Junior Road Championships
1992
2nd Duo Normand (with Jan Karlsson)
9th Overall Tour of Sweden
1993
1st Prologue Tour of Sweden
Scandinavian road champion
3rd Overall Tour de Berlin
3rd Berliner Etappenfahrt
1995
1st Road race, National Road Championships
1996
1st Stage 2 Giro d'Italia
5th Overall Tour of Sweden
10th Overall Tour de l'Ain

1st Stage 2

1997
1st Overall Tour de Normandie

1st Stage 4

1st Stage 13 Giro d'Italia
1st Points classification Tour of Sweden

1st Stage 4a

2nd Road race, National Road Championships
2nd Gran Premio Bruno Beghelli
3rd Overall Giro di Puglia
9th Road race, World Road Championships
1998
1st Overall Giro di Puglia

1st Stage 4

1st Tour du Lac Léman
1st Stage 9 Giro d'Italia
1st Stage 2 Niedersachsen-Rundfahrt
1st Stages 3 & 6 Giro d'Abruzzo
3rd Time trial, National Road Championships
9th Overall Tour of Sweden
9th Tour de Berne
2001
1st Points classification, Critérium du Dauphiné Libéré

=== Grand Tour general classification results timeline ===
Grand Tour	1996	1997	1998	1999	2000	2001
Giro d'Italia	DNF	85	DNF	—	—	—
Tour de France	—	—	—	—	91	—
Vuelta a España	—	—	—	91	DNF	DNF

Legend
—	Did not compete
DNF	Did not finish
