= Giuseppe Guerini =

Italian cyclist

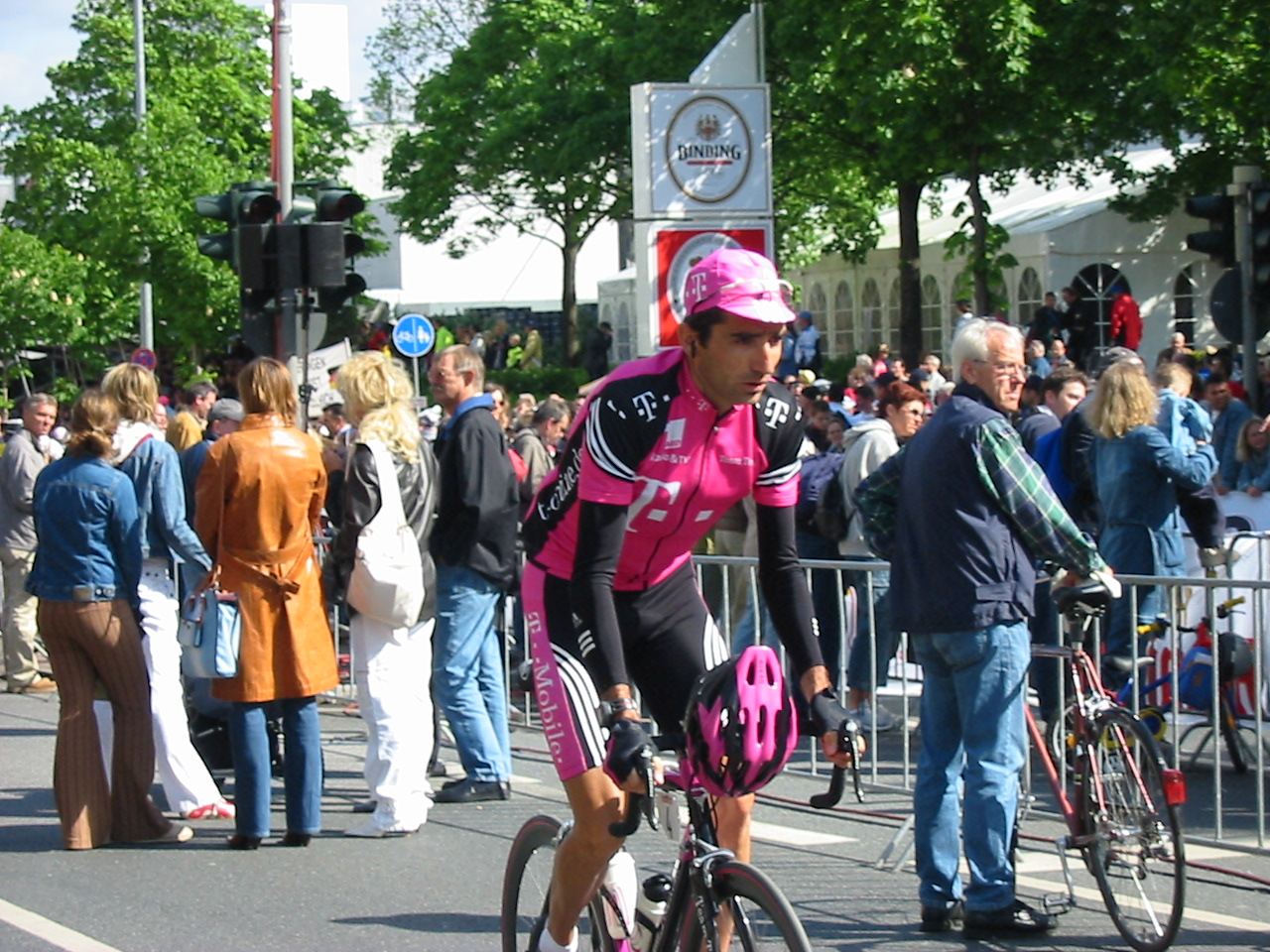
- Guerini at Rund um den Henninger-Turm 2003

Personal information
- Full name: Giuseppe Guerini
- Nickname: Turbo
- Born: 14 February 1970 (age 56) Gazzaniga, Italy
- Height: 1.78 m (5 ft 10 in)
- Weight: 65 kg (143 lb; 10 st 3 lb)

Cycling career
- Sport: Cycling
- Discipline: Road
- Role: Rider
- Rider type: Climber

Professional teams
- 1993-1995: Navigare
- 1996-1998: Polti
- 1999-2007: Deutsche Telekom/T-Mobile

Major wins
- Grand Tours Tour de France 2 individual stages (1999, 2005) Giro d'Italia 1 individual stage (1998)

Giuseppe Guerini (born 14 February 1970) is a retired Italian professional road bicycle racer. He was known throughout his career as a climbing specialist and had pronounced success in cycling's Grand Tour events. He completed six editions of the Tour de France, five Vuelta a Españas and four Giros, managing two third-place finishes in the 1997 and 1998 Giro d'Italia.

He began his professional career in 1993 with Navigare and subsequently joined Team Polti in 1996. It was during his tenure with team Polti that he achieved two podium finishes at the Giro d'Italia. He then switched to the German T-Mobile Team from 1999 to 2007. He retired from cycling at the end of 2007.

Further career highlights include a stage win in the 1998 Route du Sud, a stage win in the 1998 Volta a Portugal, a stage win in the 1999 Tour de France and again in the 2005 Tour de France, a stage win in the 2002 Catalan Week, and second place in the 2003 Tour de Suisse.

He is also remembered for an incident during the difficult Alpe d'Huez stage of the 1999 Tour de France. Guerini was leading the field and only a few hundred meters from the finish line when a cycling fan knocked him off his bicycle while attempting to take a photograph. Guerini was able to remount his bicycle and finish 21 seconds ahead of Pavel Tonkov.

Guerini is a native of Gazzaniga, Lombardy.

== Career achievements ==
=== Major results ===
1988
1st Overall Giro della Lunigiana
1991
3rd Overall Giro Ciclistico d'Italia
1994
1st Stage 9 Volta a Portugal
6th Overall Settimana Internazionale di Coppi e Bartali
1995
3rd Tour du Haut Var
3rd Gran Premio di Lugano
1996
2nd Overall Route du Sud

1st Stage 3

3rd Overall Tour de Romandie
1997
3rd Overall Giro d'Italia
5th Overall Tour de Romandie
1998
3rd Overall Giro d'Italia

1st Stage 17

5th Giro dell'Appennino
9th Overall Giro del Trentino
1999
1st Stage 10 Tour de France
3rd Overall Vuelta a Castilla y León
8th Overall Tour de Suisse
2000
1st Stage 1 (TTT) Tour de Suisse
8th Luk-Cup Bühl
2001
7th Luk-Cup Bühl
2002
2nd Overall Setmana Catalana de Ciclisme

1st Stage 3

2003
2nd Overall Tour de Suisse
8th Overall Euskal Bizikleta
2004
8th Overall Tour de Suisse
2005
1st Stage 19 Tour de France

=== Grand Tour overall classification results timeline ===
Grand Tour	1993	1994	1995	1996	1997	1998	1999	2000	2001	2002	2003	2004	2005	2006	2007
Giro d'Italia	—	32	31	19	3	3	—	—	44	—	—	—	—	—	—
Tour de France	—	—	—	29	53	—	22	26	39	80	35	24	20	26	—
/ Vuelta a España	DNF	—	—	—	—	DNF	DNF	—	—	—	—	—	—	—	DNF

Legend
—	Did not compete
DNF	Did not finish
