= Mirco Gualdi =

Italian cyclist (born 1968)

Personal information
- Born: 7 July 1968 (age 58) Alzano Lombardo, Italy

Cycling career
- Sport: Cycling
- Role: Rider

Mirco Gualdi (born 7 July 1968) is an Italian former professional racing cyclist. He rode in five editions of the Giro d'Italia. He also competed in the men's road race at the 1992 Summer Olympics.

== Major results ==
1985
2nd Time trial, National Junior Road Championships
1989
5th Gran Premio della Liberazione
1990
1st Trofeo Alcide De Gasperi
1st GP Industria e Commercio – Tr. Città di San Vendemiano
1991
1st Gran Premio Industria e Commercio Artigianato Carnaghese
1992
1st GP Industria e Commercio – Tr. Città di San Vendemiano
1993
1st Stage 4 Tour de Pologne
1997
1st Stage 17 Giro d'Italia
1st Stage 7 Ruta de Mexico
10th Veenendaal–Veenendaal
1998
2nd Paris–Tours
3rd Time trial, National Road Championships
