= Riccardo Forconi =

Italian cyclist (born 1970)

Personal information
- Born: 13 June 1970 (age 56) Empoli, Italy

Cycling career
- Sport: Cycling
- Current team: Retired
- Discipline: Road
- Role: Rider

Professional teams
- 1993–1997: Amore & Vita
- 1998–2002: Mercatone Uno

Riccardo Forconi (born 13 June 1970, in Empoli) is a former Italian racing cyclist. He rode in 10 editions of the Giro d'Italia, 3 of the Tour de France and 1 of the Vuelta a España.

== Major results ==
1995
2nd Giro della Provincia di Reggio Calabria
1996
2nd Trophée des Grimpeurs
5th Tour de Suisse
1998
3rd Giro di Toscana
1999
1st Stage 2 Giro del Trentino
