= Nicola Loda =

Italian cyclist

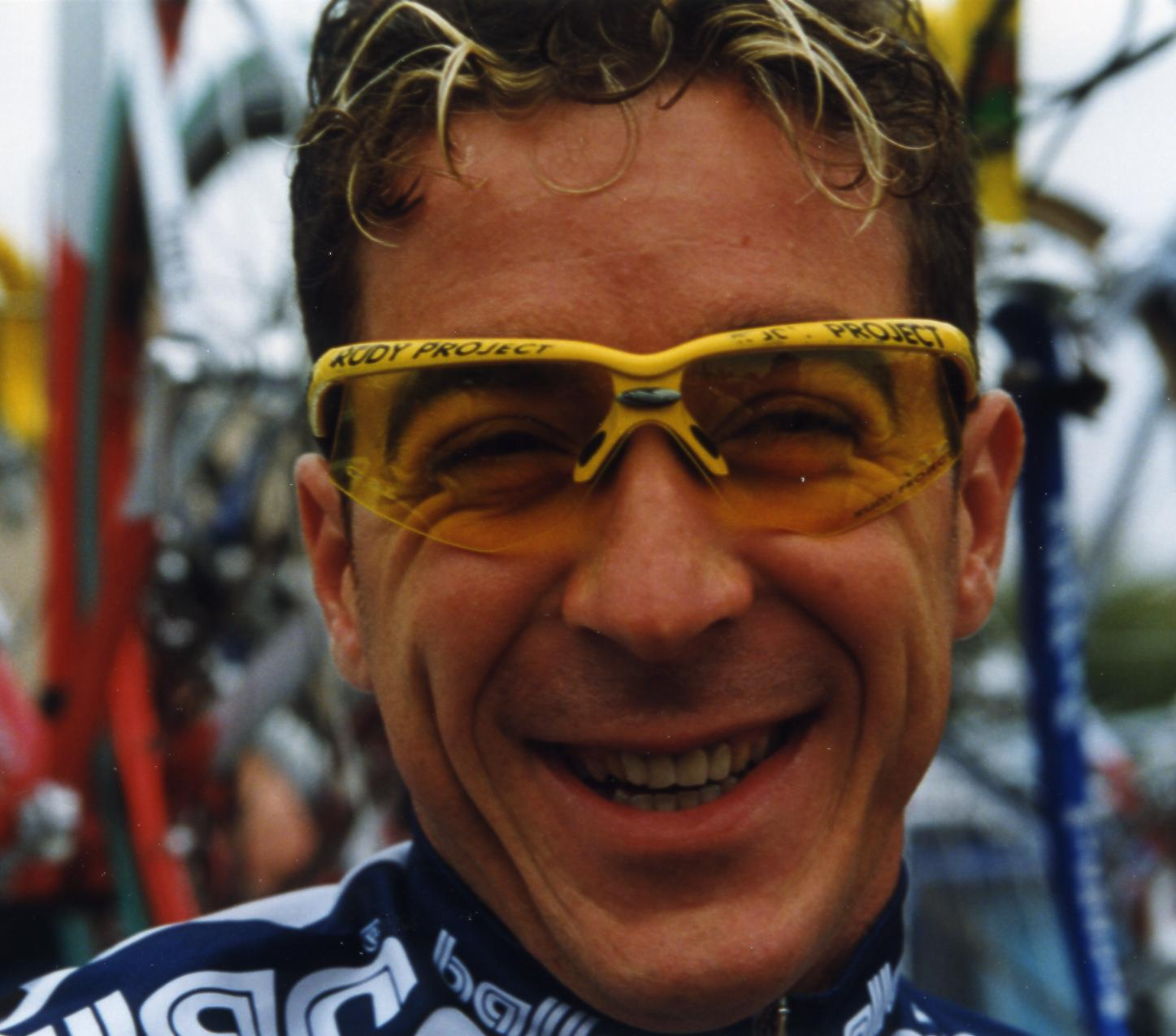

Personal information
- Full name: Nicola Loda
- Born: 21 July 1971 (age 55) Brescia, Italy
- Height: 1.83 m (6 ft 0 in)
- Weight: 73 kg (161 lb; 11 st 7 lb)

Cycling career
- Sport: Cycling
- Discipline: Road
- Role: Rider

Professional teams
- 1994–1997: GB–MG Maglificio
- 1998–1999: Ballan
- 2000–2003: Fassa Bortolo
- 2004: Tenax
- 2005–2006: Liquigas–Bianchi

Major wins
- Dekra Open (2000)

Nicola Loda (born 27 July 1971) is an Italian former racing cyclist.

== Major results ==
1989
2nd Overall Tour du Pays de Vaud
1993
1st Trofeo Città di Castelfidardo
3rd GP Industria Artigianato e Commercio Carnaghese
1996
8th GP Ouest-France
1997
3rd Luk-Cup Bühl
5th Overall Tour de Langkawi
7th Coppa Bernocchi
1998
7th Overall Tirreno–Adriatico
8th Luk-Cup Bühl
1999
3rd Overall Regio-Tour
5th Coppa Bernocchi
5th Tour de Berne
7th Overall 4 Jours de Dunkerque
8th Overall Danmark Rundt

1st Stage 3

2000
1st Dekra Open
1st Stage 2 GP du Midi-Libre
3rd Overall Tour de Luxembourg

1st Stage 2

5th Coppa Bernocchi
2002
1st Stage 1 Giro della Liguria
2003
1st Stage 2 Tour de Luxembourg
2004
10th G.P. Costa degli Etruschi
