= Nicola Miceli =

Italian cyclist

Personal information
- Born: 28 May 1971 (age 55) Desio, Italy

Cycling career
- Sport: Cycling
- Role: Rider

Nicola Miceli (born 28 May 1971) is an Italian former professional racing cyclist. He rode in five editions of the Giro d'Italia.
