= Amica Chips–Tacconi Sport =

Italian cycling team

Team information
- Registered: Italy
- Founded: 1996
- Disbanded: 2000
- Discipline: Road

Key personnel
- General manager: Marino Basso (1996–1999); Davide Boifava (2000)
- Team managers: Mario Chiesa; Bruno Cenghialta

Team name history
- 1996 1997 1998 1999 2000: Ideal–Aster Lichy; Ros Mary–Minotti Italia–Ideal; Ros Mary–Amica Chips; Amica Chips–Costa de Almeria; Amica Chips–Tacconi Sport

Amica Chips–Tacconi Sport was an Italian professional cycling team that existed from 1996 to 2000.

In 2000, the team split, creating new team Costa de Almería, and Amica Chips–Tacconi Sport. The following season, the team merged with Vini Caldirola to form Tacconi Sport–Vini Caldirola.

== Famous riders ==
- Claudio Chiappucci (1998–1999)
- Viacheslav Ekimov (1999)
- Evgeni Berzin (1999)
- Pietro Caucchioli (1999–2000)
- Ivan Basso (2000)
