= Team Polti =

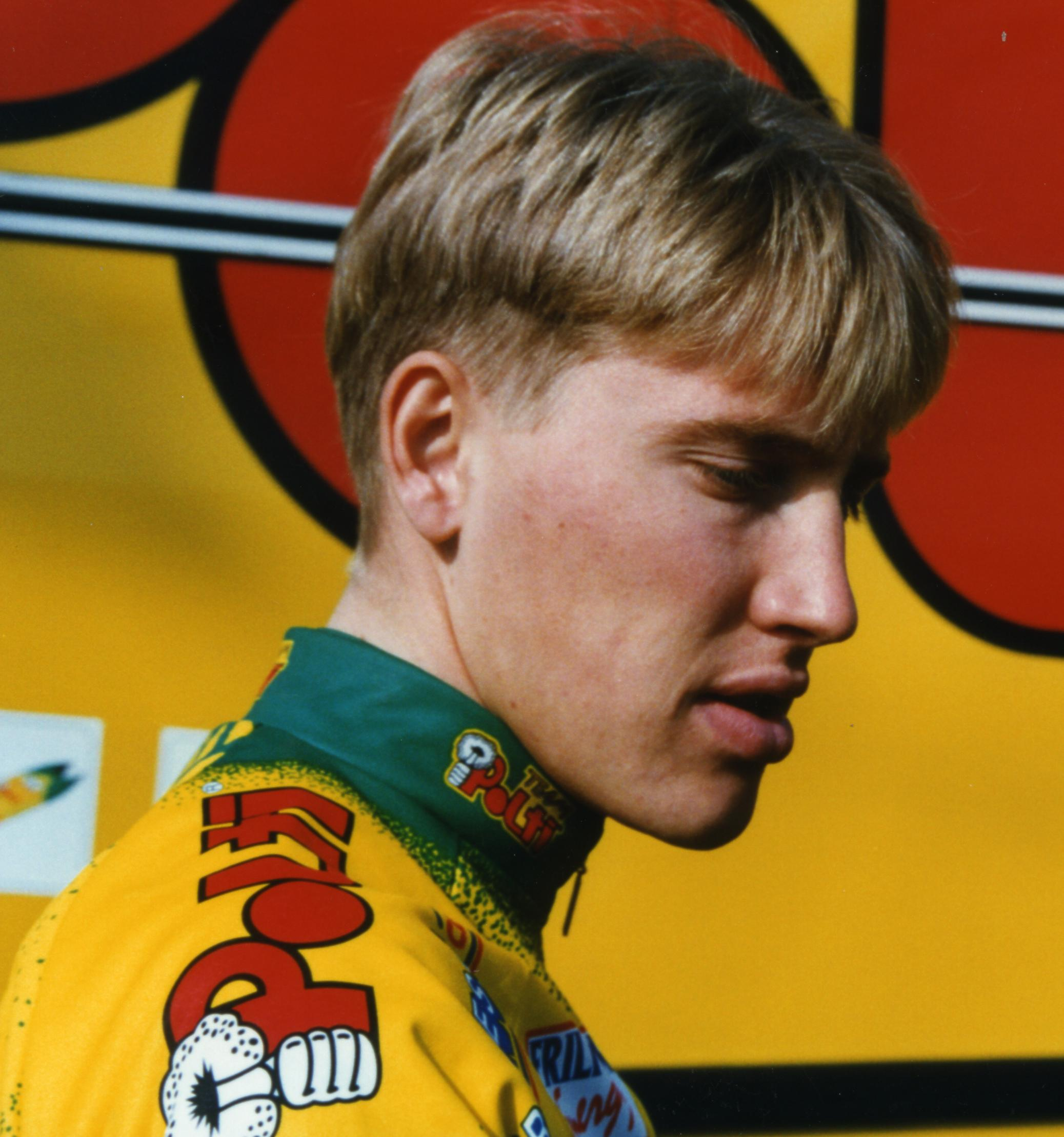
- Axel Merckx in 1997

Team information
- Registered: Italy
- Founded: 1994
- Disbanded: 2000
- Discipline: Road

Team name history
- 1994 1995 1996–2000: Polti–Granarolo; Polti–Granarolo–Santini; Polti

Team Polti was an Italian professional cycling team. It became an independent team in 1994, after the separation of Lampre-Polti, and was active until 2000. Team Polti began in 1994 with Gianluigi Stanga as directeur sportif and Vittorio Algeri and Claudio Corti as managers. The team used Fausto Coppi bikes. Other directeur sportifs included Giosuè Zenoni, Antonio Bevilacqua and Giovanni Fidanza. Team Polti gave Richard Virenque a chance after he was ejected from the 1998 Tour de France and while maintaining his innocence, his former teammates at Festina admitted taking EPO. Virenque joined Team Polti for the 1999 and 2000 seasons where he won the Mountains classification at the 1999 and 2000 Tour de France. In July 2007, Former Team Polti rider Jörg Jaksche admitted use of performance-enhancing products and alleged that this began when he was competing with Team Polti in 1997. Jaksche alleged that directeur sportif Gianluigi Stanga introduced him to EPO during the Tour de Suisse in 1997. Stanga immediately denied the accusations. Throughout its seven-year history, the team rode Fausto Coppi branded bikes and Santini provided the team with their striking cycling kit.

== Major wins ==
- Stage 1, 20 and Points classification 1994 Tour de France Abdoujaparov
- Stage 9 1995 Tour de France Outschakov
- Stage 16 2000 Tour de France Richard Virenque
- Stage 10, Points and sprint classification 1994 Giro d'Italia Abdoujaparov
- Stage 13 1999 Giro d'Italia Richard Virenque
- Stage 12 2000 Giro d'Italia Enrico Cassani
- Germany 1994 road race champion Dirk Baldinger
- Austria 1996 Time trial champion Georg Totschnig
- 1997 Military road race champion Jörg Jaksche
- 1997 Military Time trial champion Romāns Vainšteins
- 1994 Tour of Flanders Gianni Bugno
- 1995 Scheldeprijs Rossano Brasi
- 1995 Amstel Gold Race Mauro Gianetti
- 1995 Liège–Bastogne–Liège Mauro Gianetti
- HEW Cyclassics 1996 and 1999 Rossano Brasi and Mirko Celestino
- 1999 Giro di Lombardia Mirko Celestino
