= 2001 Giro d'Italia, Prologue to Stage 10 =

Cycling race stages

The 2001 Giro d'Italia was the 84th edition of the Giro d'Italia, one of cycling's Grand Tours. The Giro began in Montesilvano, with a Prologue individual time trial on 19 May, and Stage 10 occurred on 29 May with a stage to Ljubljana, Slovenia. The race finished in Milan on 10 June.

== Prologue ==
19 May 2001 — Montesilvano to Pescara, 7.6 km (4.7 mi) (ITT)

Prologue result and general classification after Prologue

Rank	Rider	Team	Time
1	Rik Verbrugghe (BEL)	Lotto–Adecco	7' 44"
2	Dario Frigo (ITA)	Fassa Bortolo	+ 9"
3	René Andrle (CZE)	ONCE–Eroski	+ 11"
4	Jan Hruška (CZE)	ONCE–Eroski	+ 13"
5	Andrea Peron (ITA)	Fassa Bortolo	s.t.
6	Andrea Noè (ITA)	Mapei–Quick-Step	+ 14"
7	Ruslan Ivanov (MDA)	Alessio	+ 16"
8	Isidro Nozal (ESP)	ONCE–Eroski	+ 18"
9	Marco Velo (ITA)	Mercatone Uno–Stream TV	s.t.
10	Abraham Olano (ESP)	ONCE–Eroski	+ 19"

== Stage 1 ==
20 May 2001 — Giulianova to Francavilla al Mare, 202 km (126 mi)

Stage 1 result

Rank	Rider	Team	Time
1	Ellis Rastelli (ITA)	Liquigas–Pata	5h 15' 06"
2	Vladimir Duma (UKR)	Ceramiche Panaria–Fiordo	s.t.
3	Gabriele Colombo (ITA)	Cantina Tollo–Acqua & Sapone	s.t.
4	Abraham Olano (ESP)	ONCE–Eroski	s.t.
5	Rik Verbrugghe (BEL)	Lotto–Adecco	s.t.
6	José Luis Arrieta (ESP)	iBanesto.com	s.t.
7	Mariano Piccoli (ITA)	Lampre–Daikin	s.t.
8	Giuseppe Di Grande (ITA)	Tacconi Sport–Vini Caldirola	s.t.
9	Marco Pantani (ITA)	Mercatone Uno–Stream TV	s.t.
10	Jan Hruška (CZE)	ONCE–Eroski	s.t.

General classification after Stage 1

Rank	Rider	Team	Time
1	Rik Verbrugghe (BEL)	Lotto–Adecco	5h 22' 50"
2	Dario Frigo (ITA)	Fassa Bortolo	+ 9"
3	Jan Hruška (CZE)	ONCE–Eroski	+ 13"
4	Abraham Olano (ESP)	ONCE–Eroski	+ 15"
5	Gabriele Colombo (ITA)	Cantina Tollo–Acqua & Sapone	+ 18"
6	Mariano Piccoli (ITA)	Lampre–Daikin	s.t.
7	Wladimir Belli (ITA)	Fassa Bortolo	+ 26"
8	José Azevedo (POR)	ONCE–Eroski	+ 28"
9	Vladimir Duma (UKR)	Ceramiche Panaria–Fiordo	+ 29"
10	Ellis Rastelli (ITA)	Liquigas–Pata	+ 30"

== Stage 2 ==
21 May 2001 — Fossacesia to Lucera, 167 km (104 mi)

Stage 2 result

Rank	Rider	Team	Time
1	Danilo Hondo (GER)	Team Telekom	3h 39' 35"
2	Rafael Mateos (ESP)	Team Colpack–Astro	s.t.
3	Gabriele Missaglia (ITA)	Lampre–Daikin	s.t.
4	Wladimir Belli (ITA)	Fassa Bortolo	s.t.
5	Massimo Strazzer (ITA)	Mobilvetta Design–Formaggi Trentini	s.t.
6	Gabriele Colombo (ITA)	Cantina Tollo–Acqua & Sapone	s.t.
7	Stefano Garzelli (ITA)	Mapei–Quick-Step	s.t.
8	Massimiliano Gentili (ITA)	Cantina Tollo–Acqua & Sapone	s.t.
9	Fredy González (COL)	Selle Italia–Pacific	s.t.
10	Ivan Gotti (ITA)	Alessio	s.t.

General classification after Stage 2

Rank	Rider	Team	Time
1	Rik Verbrugghe (BEL)	Lotto–Adecco	9h 02' 25"
2	Dario Frigo (ITA)	Fassa Bortolo	+ 9"
3	Jan Hruška (CZE)	ONCE–Eroski	+ 13"
4	Abraham Olano (ESP)	ONCE–Eroski	+ 15"
5	Gabriele Colombo (ITA)	Cantina Tollo–Acqua & Sapone	+ 18"
6	Mariano Piccoli (ITA)	Lampre–Daikin	+ 20"
7	Wladimir Belli (ITA)	Fassa Bortolo	+ 26"
8	José Azevedo (POR)	ONCE–Eroski	+ 28"
9	Vladimir Duma (UKR)	Ceramiche Panaria–Fiordo	+ 29"
10	Ellis Rastelli (ITA)	Liquigas–Pata	+ 30"

== Stage 3 ==
22 May 2001 — Lucera to Potenza, 149 km (93 mi)

Stage 3 result

Rank	Rider	Team	Time
1	Danilo Hondo (GER)	Team Telekom	3h 44' 30"
2	Endrio Leoni (ITA)	Alessio	s.t.
3	Andrej Hauptman (SLO)	Tacconi Sport–Vini Caldirola	s.t.
4	Massimo Strazzer (ITA)	Mobilvetta Design–Formaggi Trentini	s.t.
5	Davide Rebellin (ITA)	Liquigas–Pata	s.t.
6	Stefano Garzelli (ITA)	Mapei–Quick-Step	s.t.
7	Mario Manzoni (ITA)	Alexia Alluminio	s.t.
8	Mariano Piccoli (ITA)	Lampre–Daikin	s.t.
9	Gabriele Missaglia (ITA)	Lampre–Daikin	s.t.
10	Giuseppe Di Grande (ITA)	Tacconi Sport–Vini Caldirola	s.t.

General classification after Stage 3

Rank	Rider	Team	Time
1	Rik Verbrugghe (BEL)	Lotto–Adecco	12h 46' 55"
2	Dario Frigo (ITA)	Fassa Bortolo	+ 9"
3	Jan Hruška (CZE)	ONCE–Eroski	+ 13"
4	Abraham Olano (ESP)	ONCE–Eroski	+ 15"
5	Gabriele Colombo (ITA)	Cantina Tollo–Acqua & Sapone	+ 18"
6	Mariano Piccoli (ITA)	Lampre–Daikin	+ 20"
7	Wladimir Belli (ITA)	Fassa Bortolo	+ 26"
8	José Azevedo (POR)	ONCE–Eroski	+ 28"
9	Vladimir Duma (UKR)	Ceramiche Panaria–Fiordo	+ 29"
10	Ellis Rastelli (ITA)	Liquigas–Pata	+ 30"

== Stage 4 ==
23 May 2001 — Potenza to Mercogliano, 169 km (105 mi)

Stage 4 result

Rank	Rider	Team	Time
1	Danilo Di Luca (ITA)	Cantina Tollo–Acqua & Sapone	4h 34' 12"
2	Gilberto Simoni (ITA)	Lampre–Daikin	s.t.
3	Stefano Garzelli (ITA)	Mapei–Quick-Step	s.t.
4	Giuliano Figueras (ITA)	Ceramiche Panaria–Fiordo	s.t.
5	Davide Rebellin (ITA)	Liquigas–Pata	s.t.
6	Serhiy Honchar (UKR)	Liquigas–Pata	+ 3"
7	Dario Frigo (ITA)	Fassa Bortolo	s.t.
8	José Azevedo (POR)	ONCE–Eroski	s.t.
9	Ivan Gotti (ITA)	Alessio	s.t.
10	Giuseppe Di Grande (ITA)	Tacconi Sport–Vini Caldirola	s.t.

General classification after Stage 4

Rank	Rider	Team	Time
1	Dario Frigo (ITA)	Fassa Bortolo	17h 21' 19"
2	Abraham Olano (ESP)	ONCE–Eroski	+ 12"
3	Gilberto Simoni (ITA)	Lampre–Daikin	+ 13"
4	Wladimir Belli (ITA)	Fassa Bortolo	+ 17"
5	José Azevedo (POR)	ONCE–Eroski	+ 19"
6	Giuseppe Di Grande (ITA)	Tacconi Sport–Vini Caldirola	+ 25"
7	Jan Hruška (CZE)	ONCE–Eroski	+ 28"
8	Vladimir Duma (UKR)	Ceramiche Panaria–Fiordo	+ 33"
9	Oscar Camenzind (SUI)	Lampre–Daikin	+ 35"
10	Andrea Noè (ITA)	Mapei–Quick-Step	+ 42"

== Stage 5 ==
24 May 2001 — Avellino to Nettuno, 229 km (142 mi)

Stage 5 result

Rank	Rider	Team	Time
1	Ivan Quaranta (ITA)	Alexia Alluminio	5h 29' 16"
2	Mario Cipollini (ITA)	Saeco	s.t.
3	Moreno Di Biase (ITA)	Mobilvetta Design–Formaggi Trentini	s.t.
4	Jeroen Blijlevens (NED)	Lotto–Adecco	s.t.
5	Zoran Klemenčič (SLO)	Tacconi Sport–Vini Caldirola	s.t.
6	Marco Zanotti (ITA)	Liquigas–Pata	s.t.
7	Damien Nazon (FRA)	Bonjour	s.t.
8	Endrio Leoni (ITA)	Alessio	s.t.
9	Enrico Degano (ITA)	Ceramiche Panaria–Fiordo	s.t.
10	Massimo Strazzer (ITA)	Mobilvetta Design–Formaggi Trentini	s.t.

General classification after Stage 5

Rank	Rider	Team	Time
1	Dario Frigo (ITA)	Fassa Bortolo	22h 50' 36"
2	Abraham Olano (ESP)	ONCE–Eroski	+ 12"
3	Gilberto Simoni (ITA)	Lampre–Daikin	+ 13"
4	Wladimir Belli (ITA)	Fassa Bortolo	+ 17"
5	José Azevedo (POR)	ONCE–Eroski	+ 19"
6	Giuseppe Di Grande (ITA)	Tacconi Sport–Vini Caldirola	+ 25"
7	Jan Hruška (CZE)	ONCE–Eroski	+ 28"
8	Vladimir Duma (UKR)	Ceramiche Panaria–Fiordo	+ 33"
9	Oscar Camenzind (SUI)	Lampre–Daikin	+ 35"
10	Gabriele Colombo (ITA)	Cantina Tollo–Acqua & Sapone	s.t.

== Stage 6 ==
25 May 2001 — Nettuno to Rieti, 150 km (93 mi)

Stage 6 result

Rank	Rider	Team	Time
1	Mario Cipollini (ITA)	Saeco	4h 13' 23"
2	Danilo Hondo (GER)	Team Telekom	s.t.
3	Massimo Strazzer (ITA)	Mobilvetta Design–Formaggi Trentini	s.t.
4	Mauro Gerosa (ITA)	Tacconi Sport–Vini Caldirola	s.t.
5	Jeroen Blijlevens (NED)	Lotto–Adecco	s.t.
6	Endrio Leoni (ITA)	Alessio	s.t.
7	Marco Zanotti (ITA)	Liquigas–Pata	s.t.
8	Alexis Rodríguez (ESP)	Kelme–Costa Blanca	s.t.
9	Gabriele Missaglia (ITA)	Lampre–Daikin	s.t.
10	Giuliano Figueras (ITA)	Ceramiche Panaria–Fiordo	s.t.

General classification after Stage 6

Rank	Rider	Team	Time
1	Dario Frigo (ITA)	Fassa Bortolo	27h 03' 58"
2	Abraham Olano (ESP)	ONCE–Eroski	+ 12"
3	Gilberto Simoni (ITA)	Lampre–Daikin	+ 13"
4	Wladimir Belli (ITA)	Fassa Bortolo	+ 17"
5	José Azevedo (POR)	ONCE–Eroski	+ 19"
6	Giuseppe Di Grande (ITA)	Tacconi Sport–Vini Caldirola	+ 25"
7	Jan Hruška (CZE)	ONCE–Eroski	+ 28"
8	Vladimir Duma (UKR)	Ceramiche Panaria–Fiordo	+ 33"
9	Oscar Camenzind (SUI)	Lampre–Daikin	+ 35"
10	Gabriele Colombo (ITA)	Cantina Tollo–Acqua & Sapone	+ 38"

== Stage 7 ==
26 May 2001 — Rieti to Montevarchi, 239 km (149 mi)

Stage 7 result

Rank	Rider	Team	Time
1	Stefano Zanini (ITA)	Mapei–Quick-Step	6h 48' 02"
2	Gabriele Missaglia (ITA)	Lampre–Daikin	s.t.
3	Jan Ullrich (GER)	Team Telekom	s.t.
4	Matthias Kessler (GER)	Team Telekom	s.t.
5	Wladimir Belli (ITA)	Fassa Bortolo	s.t.
6	Mickaël Pichon (FRA)	Bonjour	s.t.
7	José Luis Arrieta (ESP)	iBanesto.com	s.t.
8	Paolo Savoldelli (ITA)	Saeco	s.t.
9	Davide Rebellin (ITA)	Liquigas–Pata	s.t.
10	Rinaldo Nocentini (ITA)	Mapei–Quick-Step	s.t.

General classification after Stage 7

Rank	Rider	Team	Time
1	Dario Frigo (ITA)	Fassa Bortolo	35h 52' 00"
2	Abraham Olano (ESP)	ONCE–Eroski	+ 12"
3	Gilberto Simoni (ITA)	Lampre–Daikin	+ 13"
4	Wladimir Belli (ITA)	Fassa Bortolo	+ 17"
5	José Azevedo (POR)	ONCE–Eroski	+ 19"
6	Jan Hruška (CZE)	ONCE–Eroski	+ 28"
7	Oscar Camenzind (SUI)	Lampre–Daikin	+ 35"
8	Andrea Noè (ITA)	Mapei–Quick-Step	+ 42"
9	Danilo Di Luca (ITA)	Cantina Tollo–Acqua & Sapone	+ 48"
10	Stefano Garzelli (ITA)	Mapei–Quick-Step	+ 57"

== Stage 8 ==
27 May 2001 — Montecatini Terme to Reggio Emilia, 185 km (115 mi)

Stage 8 result

Rank	Rider	Team	Time
1	Pietro Caucchioli (ITA)	Alessio	4h 54' 23"
2	Davide Rebellin (ITA)	Liquigas–Pata	+ 33"
3	Fredy González (COL)	Selle Italia–Pacific	s.t.
4	Giuliano Figueras (ITA)	Ceramiche Panaria–Fiordo	s.t.
5	Unai Osa (ESP)	iBanesto.com	s.t.
6	José Luis Arrieta (ESP)	iBanesto.com	s.t.
7	José Azevedo (POR)	ONCE–Eroski	+ 35"
8	Hernán Buenahora (COL)	Selle Italia–Pacific	s.t.
9	Julio Alberto Pérez (MEX)	Ceramiche Panaria–Fiordo	+ 38"
10	Danilo Di Luca (ITA)	Cantina Tollo–Acqua & Sapone	+ 51"

General classification after Stage 8

Rank	Rider	Team	Time
1	Dario Frigo (ITA)	Fassa Bortolo	38h 47' 14"
2	José Azevedo (POR)	ONCE–Eroski	+ 3"
3	Abraham Olano (ESP)	ONCE–Eroski	+ 14"
4	Gilberto Simoni (ITA)	Lampre–Daikin	+ 15"
5	Wladimir Belli (ITA)	Fassa Bortolo	+ 19"
6	Jan Hruška (CZE)	ONCE–Eroski	+ 30"
7	Oscar Camenzind (SUI)	Lampre–Daikin	+ 37"
8	Andrea Noè (ITA)	Mapei–Quick-Step	+ 44"
9	Giuliano Figueras (ITA)	Ceramiche Panaria–Fiordo	+ 45"
10	Unai Osa (ESP)	iBanesto.com	+ 48"

== Stage 9 ==
28 May 2001 — Reggio Emilia to Rovigo, 142 km (88 mi)

Stage 9 result

Rank	Rider	Team	Time
1	Mario Cipollini (ITA)	Saeco	3h 27' 41"
2	Danilo Hondo (GER)	Team Telekom	s.t.
3	Andrej Hauptman (SLO)	Tacconi Sport–Vini Caldirola	s.t.
4	Alberto Ongarato (ITA)	Mobilvetta Design–Formaggi Trentini	s.t.
5	Guido Trenti (USA)	Cantina Tollo–Acqua & Sapone	s.t.
6	Zoran Klemenčič (SLO)	Tacconi Sport–Vini Caldirola	s.t.
7	Ivan Quaranta (ITA)	Alexia Alluminio	s.t.
8	Dimitri Konyshev (RUS)	Fassa Bortolo	s.t.
9	Massimo Strazzer (ITA)	Mobilvetta Design–Formaggi Trentini	s.t.
10	Matteo Tosatto (ITA)	Fassa Bortolo	s.t.

General classification after Stage 9

Rank	Rider	Team	Time
1	Dario Frigo (ITA)	Fassa Bortolo	42h 14' 55"
2	José Azevedo (POR)	ONCE–Eroski	+ 3"
3	Abraham Olano (ESP)	ONCE–Eroski	+ 14"
4	Gilberto Simoni (ITA)	Lampre–Daikin	+ 15"
5	Wladimir Belli (ITA)	Fassa Bortolo	+ 19"
6	Jan Hruška (CZE)	ONCE–Eroski	+ 30"
7	Oscar Camenzind (SUI)	Lampre–Daikin	+ 37"
8	Andrea Noè (ITA)	Mapei–Quick-Step	+ 44"
9	Giuliano Figueras (ITA)	Ceramiche Panaria–Fiordo	+ 45"
10	Unai Osa (ESP)	iBanesto.com	+ 48"

== Stage 10 ==
29 May 2001 — Lido di Jesolo to Ljubljana, 212 km (132 mi)

Stage 10 result

Rank	Rider	Team	Time
1	Denis Zanette (ITA)	Liquigas–Pata	5h 16' 21"
2	Mario Manzoni (ITA)	Alexia Alluminio	+ 3"
3	Isidro Nozal (ESP)	ONCE–Eroski	s.t.
4	Fabio Sacchi (ITA)	Saeco	+ 15"
5	Andrej Hauptman (SLO)	Tacconi Sport–Vini Caldirola	s.t.
6	Davide Casarotto (ITA)	Alessio	s.t.
7	Eddy Serri (ITA)	Alexia Alluminio	s.t.
8	Michele Gobbi (ITA)	Mobilvetta Design–Formaggi Trentini	s.t.
9	David Navas (ESP)	iBanesto.com	s.t.
10	Renzo Mazzoleni (ITA)	Team Colpack–Astro	+ 5' 17"

General classification after Stage 10

Rank	Rider	Team	Time
1	Dario Frigo (ITA)	Fassa Bortolo	47h 41' 21"
2	José Azevedo (POR)	ONCE–Eroski	+ 3"
3	Abraham Olano (ESP)	ONCE–Eroski	+ 14"
4	Gilberto Simoni (ITA)	Lampre–Daikin	+ 15"
5	Wladimir Belli (ITA)	Fassa Bortolo	+ 19"
6	Jan Hruška (CZE)	ONCE–Eroski	+ 30"
7	Andrea Noè (ITA)	Mapei–Quick-Step	+ 44"
8	Giuliano Figueras (ITA)	Ceramiche Panaria–Fiordo	+ 45"
9	Unai Osa (ESP)	iBanesto.com	+ 48"
10	Danilo Di Luca (ITA)	Cantina Tollo–Acqua & Sapone	s.t.
