= 2001 Giro d'Italia, Stage 11 to Stage 21 =

2001 cycling tournament

The 2001 Giro d'Italia was the 84th edition of the Giro d'Italia, one of cycling's Grand Tours. The Giro began in Montesilvano, with a Prologue individual time trial on 19 May, and Stage 11 occurred on 30 May with a stage from Bled, Slovenia. The race finished in Milan on 10 June.

== Stage 11 ==
30 May 2001 — Bled to Gorizia, 187 km (116 mi)

Stage 11 result

Rank	Rider	Team	Time
1	Pablo Lastras (ESP)	iBanesto.com	4h 38' 31"
2	Giovanni Lombardi (ITA)	Team Telekom	+ 10"
3	Massimiliano Mori (ITA)	Saeco	s.t.
4	Uroš Murn (SLO)	Mobilvetta Design–Formaggi Trentini	s.t.
5	Alexis Rodríguez (ESP)	Kelme–Costa Blanca	s.t.
6	Giuseppe Di Grande (ITA)	Tacconi Sport–Vini Caldirola	s.t.
7	Antonio Varriale (ITA)	Ceramiche Panaria–Fiordo	s.t.
8	Fortunato Baliani (ITA)	Selle Italia–Pacific	s.t.
9	Joaquín López (ESP)	Kelme–Costa Blanca	s.t.
10	Alberto Elli (ITA)	Team Telekom	+ 14"

General classification after Stage 11

Rank	Rider	Team	Time
1	Dario Frigo (ITA)	Fassa Bortolo	52h 25' 07"
2	José Azevedo (POR)	ONCE–Eroski	+ 3"
3	Abraham Olano (ESP)	ONCE–Eroski	+ 14"
4	Gilberto Simoni (ITA)	Lampre–Daikin	+ 15"
5	Wladimir Belli (ITA)	Fassa Bortolo	+ 19"
6	Jan Hruška (CZE)	ONCE–Eroski	+ 30"
7	Andrea Noè (ITA)	Mapei–Quick-Step	+ 44"
8	Giuliano Figueras (ITA)	Ceramiche Panaria–Fiordo	+ 45"
9	Unai Osa (ESP)	iBanesto.com	+ 48"
10	Danilo Di Luca (ITA)	Cantina Tollo–Acqua & Sapone	s.t.

== Stage 12 ==
31 May 2001 — Gradisca d'Isonzo to Montebelluna, 139 km (86 mi)

Stage 12 result

Rank	Rider	Team	Time
1	Matteo Tosatto (ITA)	Fassa Bortolo	3h 33' 17"
2	Zoran Klemenčič (SLO)	Tacconi Sport–Vini Caldirola	s.t.
3	Gilberto Simoni (ITA)	Lampre–Daikin	s.t.
4	Massimo Strazzer (ITA)	Mobilvetta Design–Formaggi Trentini	+ 10"
5	Marco Zanotti (ITA)	Liquigas–Pata	s.t.
6	Ivan Quaranta (ITA)	Alexia Alluminio	s.t.
7	Giovanni Lombardi (ITA)	Team Telekom	s.t.
8	Endrio Leoni (ITA)	Alessio	s.t.
9	Davide Rebellin (ITA)	Liquigas–Pata	s.t.
10	Giuseppe Di Grande (ITA)	Tacconi Sport–Vini Caldirola	s.t.

General classification after Stage 12

Rank	Rider	Team	Time
1	Dario Frigo (ITA)	Fassa Bortolo	55h 58' 34"
2	Gilberto Simoni (ITA)	Lampre–Daikin	+ 1"
3	José Azevedo (POR)	ONCE–Eroski	+ 3"
4	Abraham Olano (ESP)	ONCE–Eroski	+ 14"
5	Wladimir Belli (ITA)	Fassa Bortolo	+ 19"
6	Jan Hruška (CZE)	ONCE–Eroski	+ 30"
7	Andrea Noè (ITA)	Mapei–Quick-Step	+ 44"
8	Giuliano Figueras (ITA)	Ceramiche Panaria–Fiordo	+ 45"
9	Unai Osa (ESP)	iBanesto.com	+ 48"
10	Danilo Di Luca (ITA)	Cantina Tollo–Acqua & Sapone	+ 57"

== Stage 13 ==
1 June 2001 — Montebelluna to Passo Pordoi, 255 km (158 mi)

Stage 13 result

Rank	Rider	Team	Time
1	Julio Alberto Pérez (MEX)	Ceramiche Panaria–Fiordo	7h 24' 48"
2	Gilberto Simoni (ITA)	Lampre–Daikin	s.t.
3	Dario Frigo (ITA)	Fassa Bortolo	+ 45"
4	Hernán Buenahora (COL)	Selle Italia–Pacific	+ 48"
5	Carlos Alberto Contreras (COL)	Selle Italia–Pacific	+ 49"
6	Unai Osa (ESP)	iBanesto.com	+ 57"
7	Wladimir Belli (ITA)	Fassa Bortolo	+ 1' 01"
8	Ivan Gotti (ITA)	Alessio	+ 1' 03"
9	José Castelblanco (COL)	Selle Italia–Pacific	+ 2' 16"
10	Abraham Olano (ESP)	ONCE–Eroski	+ 3' 02"

General classification after Stage 13

Rank	Rider	Team	Time
1	Gilberto Simoni (ITA)	Lampre–Daikin	63h 13' 15"
2	Dario Frigo (ITA)	Fassa Bortolo	+ 48"
3	Wladimir Belli (ITA)	Fassa Bortolo	+ 1' 27"
4	Unai Osa (ESP)	iBanesto.com	+ 1' 52"
5	Ivan Gotti (ITA)	Alessio	+ 2' 14"
6	Hernán Buenahora (COL)	Selle Italia–Pacific	+ 2' 19"
7	Carlos Alberto Contreras (COL)	Selle Italia–Pacific	+ 2' 36"
8	Abraham Olano (ESP)	ONCE–Eroski	+ 3' 23"
9	Andrea Noè (ITA)	Mapei–Quick-Step	+ 3' 53"
10	José Azevedo (POR)	ONCE–Eroski	+ 4' 56"

== Stage 14 ==
2 June 2001 — Cavalese to Arco, 163 km (101 mi)

Stage 14 result

Rank	Rider	Team	Time
1	Carlos Alberto Contreras (COL)	Selle Italia–Pacific	5h 13' 30"
2	Wladimir Belli (ITA)	Fassa Bortolo	s.t.
3	Unai Osa (ESP)	iBanesto.com	s.t.
4	Dario Frigo (ITA)	Fassa Bortolo	s.t.
5	Gilberto Simoni (ITA)	Lampre–Daikin	s.t.
6	Hernán Buenahora (COL)	Selle Italia–Pacific	s.t.
7	Serhiy Honchar (UKR)	Liquigas–Pata	+ 4"
8	Paolo Savoldelli (ITA)	Saeco	s.t.
9	Peter Luttenberger (AUT)	Tacconi Sport–Vini Caldirola	+ 22"
10	Andrea Noè (ITA)	Mapei–Quick-Step	s.t.

General classification after Stage 14

Rank	Rider	Team	Time
1	Gilberto Simoni (ITA)	Lampre–Daikin	68h 36' 45"
2	Dario Frigo (ITA)	Fassa Bortolo	+ 44"
3	Unai Osa (ESP)	iBanesto.com	+ 1' 44"
4	Hernán Buenahora (COL)	Selle Italia–Pacific	+ 2' 19"
5	Carlos Alberto Contreras (COL)	Selle Italia–Pacific	+ 2' 24"
6	Ivan Gotti (ITA)	Alessio	+ 2' 36"
7	Abraham Olano (ESP)	ONCE–Eroski	+ 3' 45"
8	Andrea Noè (ITA)	Mapei–Quick-Step	+ 4' 15"
9	Serhiy Honchar (UKR)	Liquigas–Pata	+ 5' 07"
10	José Azevedo (POR)	ONCE–Eroski	+ 5' 18"

== Stage 15 ==
3 June 2001 — Sirmione to Salò, 55.5 km (34.5 mi) (ITT)

Stage 15 result

Rank	Rider	Team	Time
1	Dario Frigo (ITA)	Fassa Bortolo	1h 11' 35"
2	Gilberto Simoni (ITA)	Lampre–Daikin	+ 29"
3	Abraham Olano (ESP)	ONCE–Eroski	+ 1' 16"
4	Serhiy Honchar (UKR)	Liquigas–Pata	+ 1' 31"
5	José Azevedo (POR)	ONCE–Eroski	+ 2' 24"
6	Marco Velo (ITA)	Mercatone Uno–Stream TV	+ 2' 44"
7	Andrea Peron (ITA)	Fassa Bortolo	+ 2' 50"
8	Rik Verbrugghe (BEL)	Lotto–Adecco	+ 3' 39"
9	Laurent Desbiens (FRA)	Kelme–Costa Blanca	+ 3' 43"
10	Andrea Noè (ITA)	Mapei–Quick-Step	+ 3' 48"

General classification after Stage 15

Rank	Rider	Team	Time
1	Gilberto Simoni (ITA)	Lampre–Daikin	69h 48' 49"
2	Dario Frigo (ITA)	Fassa Bortolo	+ 15"
3	Abraham Olano (ESP)	ONCE–Eroski	+ 4' 32"
4	Unai Osa (ESP)	iBanesto.com	+ 5' 22"
5	Serhiy Honchar (UKR)	Liquigas–Pata	+ 6' 10"
6	José Azevedo (POR)	ONCE–Eroski	+ 7' 14"
7	Andrea Noè (ITA)	Mapei–Quick-Step	+ 7' 35"
8	Ivan Gotti (ITA)	Alessio	+ 7' 39"
9	Hernán Buenahora (COL)	Selle Italia–Pacific	+ 7' 40"
10	Carlos Alberto Contreras (COL)	Selle Italia–Pacific	+ 8' 20"

== Stage 16 ==
4 June 2001 — Erbusco to Parma, 142 km (88 mi)

Stage 16 result

Rank	Rider	Team	Time
1	Ivan Quaranta (ITA)	Alexia Alluminio	3h 52' 55"
2	Endrio Leoni (ITA)	Alessio	s.t.
3	Mario Cipollini (ITA)	Saeco	s.t.
4	Danilo Hondo (GER)	Team Telekom	s.t.
5	Marco Zanotti (ITA)	Liquigas–Pata	s.t.
6	Massimo Strazzer (ITA)	Mobilvetta Design–Formaggi Trentini	s.t.
7	Stefano Zanini (ITA)	Mapei–Quick-Step	s.t.
8	Andrej Hauptman (SLO)	Tacconi Sport–Vini Caldirola	s.t.
9	Mauro Gerosa (ITA)	Tacconi Sport–Vini Caldirola	s.t.
10	Guido Trenti (USA)	Cantina Tollo–Acqua & Sapone	s.t.

General classification after Stage 16

Rank	Rider	Team	Time
1	Gilberto Simoni (ITA)	Lampre–Daikin	73h 41' 44"
2	Dario Frigo (ITA)	Fassa Bortolo	+ 15"
3	Abraham Olano (ESP)	ONCE–Eroski	+ 4' 32"
4	Unai Osa (ESP)	iBanesto.com	+ 5' 22"
5	Serhiy Honchar (UKR)	Liquigas–Pata	+ 6' 10"
6	José Azevedo (POR)	ONCE–Eroski	+ 7' 14"
7	Andrea Noè (ITA)	Mapei–Quick-Step	+ 7' 35"
8	Ivan Gotti (ITA)	Alessio	+ 7' 39"
9	Hernán Buenahora (COL)	Selle Italia–Pacific	+ 7' 40"
10	Carlos Alberto Contreras (COL)	Selle Italia–Pacific	+ 8' 20"

== Rest day ==
5 June 2001

== Stage 17 ==
6 June 2001 — Sanremo to Sanremo, 119 km (74 mi)

Stage 17 result

Rank	Rider	Team	Time
1	Pietro Caucchioli (ITA)	Alessio	3h 36' 52"
2	José Azevedo (POR)	ONCE–Eroski	+ 2"
3	Jan Ullrich (GER)	Team Telekom	+ 27"
4	Gianni Faresin (ITA)	Liquigas–Pata	s.t.
5	Matthias Kessler (GER)	Team Telekom	+ 36"
6	Giuliano Figueras (ITA)	Ceramiche Panaria–Fiordo	+ 39"
7	Mauro Zanetti (ITA)	Alessio	s.t.
8	Matteo Tosatto (ITA)	Fassa Bortolo	s.t.
9	Marco Velo (ITA)	Mercatone Uno–Stream TV	s.t.
10	Unai Osa (ESP)	iBanesto.com	s.t.

General classification after Stage 17

Rank	Rider	Team	Time
1	Gilberto Simoni (ITA)	Lampre–Daikin	77h 19' 15"
2	Dario Frigo (ITA)	Fassa Bortolo	+ 15"
3	Abraham Olano (ESP)	ONCE–Eroski	+ 4' 28"
4	Unai Osa (ESP)	iBanesto.com	+ 5' 22"
5	Serhiy Honchar (UKR)	Liquigas–Pata	+ 6' 10"
6	José Azevedo (POR)	ONCE–Eroski	+ 6' 29"
7	Andrea Noè (ITA)	Mapei–Quick-Step	+ 7' 35"
8	Ivan Gotti (ITA)	Alessio	+ 7' 39"
9	Hernán Buenahora (COL)	Selle Italia–Pacific	+ 7' 40"
10	Carlos Alberto Contreras (COL)	Selle Italia–Pacific	+ 8' 20"

== Stage 18 ==
7 June 2001 — ~~Imperia to Sant'Anna di Vinadio~~

The stage was cancelled, after a police raid uncovered widespread doping in the peloton.

== Stage 19 ==
8 June 2001 — Alba to Busto Arsizio, 163 km (101 mi)

Stage 19 result

Rank	Rider	Team	Time
1	Mario Cipollini (ITA)	Saeco	3h 35' 04"
2	Marco Zanotti (ITA)	Liquigas–Pata	s.t.
3	Danilo Hondo (GER)	Team Telekom	s.t.
4	Massimo Strazzer (ITA)	Mobilvetta Design–Formaggi Trentini	s.t.
5	Dimitri Konyshev (RUS)	Fassa Bortolo	s.t.
6	Andrej Hauptman (SLO)	Tacconi Sport–Vini Caldirola	s.t.
7	Fabio Baldato (ITA)	Fassa Bortolo	s.t.
8	Ivan Quaranta (ITA)	Alexia Alluminio	s.t.
9	Mauro Gerosa (ITA)	Tacconi Sport–Vini Caldirola	s.t.
10	Giovanni Lombardi (ITA)	Team Telekom	s.t.

General classification after Stage 19

Rank	Rider	Team	Time
1	Gilberto Simoni (ITA)	Lampre–Daikin	80h 54' 31"
2	Abraham Olano (ESP)	ONCE–Eroski	+ 4' 16"
3	Unai Osa (ESP)	iBanesto.com	+ 5' 22"
4	Serhiy Honchar (UKR)	Liquigas–Pata	+ 6' 10"
5	José Azevedo (POR)	ONCE–Eroski	+ 6' 29"
6	Andrea Noè (ITA)	Mapei–Quick-Step	+ 7' 35"
7	Ivan Gotti (ITA)	Alessio	+ 7' 39"
8	Hernán Buenahora (COL)	Selle Italia–Pacific	+ 7' 49"
9	Carlos Alberto Contreras (COL)	Selle Italia–Pacific	+ 8' 20"
10	Pietro Caucchioli (ITA)	Alessio	+ 10' 10"

== Stage 20 ==
9 June 2001 — Busto Arsizio to Arona, 181 km (112 mi)

Stage 20 result

Rank	Rider	Team	Time
1	Gilberto Simoni (ITA)	Lampre–Daikin	5h 03' 38"
2	Paolo Savoldelli (ITA)	Saeco	+ 2' 25"
3	Giuliano Figueras (ITA)	Ceramiche Panaria–Fiordo	+ 2' 43"
4	Daniele De Paoli (ITA)	Mercatone Uno–Stream TV	s.t.
5	Matteo Tosatto (ITA)	Fassa Bortolo	+ 3' 03"
6	Marco Velo (ITA)	Mercatone Uno–Stream TV	s.t.
7	Serhiy Honchar (UKR)	Liquigas–Pata	s.t.
8	Vladimir Duma (UKR)	Ceramiche Panaria–Fiordo	s.t.
9	Unai Osa (ESP)	iBanesto.com	s.t.
10	Andrea Noè (ITA)	Mapei–Quick-Step	s.t.

General classification after Stage 20

Rank	Rider	Team	Time
1	Gilberto Simoni (ITA)	Lampre–Daikin	85h 57' 57"
2	Abraham Olano (ESP)	ONCE–Eroski	+ 7' 31"
3	Unai Osa (ESP)	iBanesto.com	+ 8' 37"
4	Serhiy Honchar (UKR)	Liquigas–Pata	+ 9' 25"
5	José Azevedo (POR)	ONCE–Eroski	+ 9' 44"
6	Andrea Noè (ITA)	Mapei–Quick-Step	+ 10' 50"
7	Ivan Gotti (ITA)	Alessio	+ 10' 54"
8	Carlos Alberto Contreras (COL)	Selle Italia–Pacific	+ 11' 35"
9	Pietro Caucchioli (ITA)	Alessio	+ 13' 25"
10	Giuliano Figueras (ITA)	Ceramiche Panaria–Fiordo	+ 14' 08"

== Stage 21 ==
10 June 2001 — Arona to Milan, 121 km (75 mi)

Stage 21 result

Rank	Rider	Team	Time
1	Mario Cipollini (ITA)	Saeco	3h 05' 01"
2	Danilo Hondo (GER)	Team Telekom	s.t.
3	Marco Zanotti (ITA)	Liquigas–Pata	s.t.
4	Mauro Gerosa (ITA)	Tacconi Sport–Vini Caldirola	s.t.
5	Ivan Quaranta (ITA)	Alexia Alluminio	s.t.
6	Francesco Casagrande (ITA)	Fassa Bortolo	s.t.
7	Andrej Hauptman (SLO)	Tacconi Sport–Vini Caldirola	s.t.
8	Stefano Zanini (ITA)	Mapei–Quick-Step	s.t.
9	Guido Trenti (USA)	Cantina Tollo–Acqua & Sapone	s.t.
10	Paolo Bossoni (ITA)	Tacconi Sport–Vini Caldirola	s.t.

General classification after Stage 21

Rank	Rider	Team	Time
1	Gilberto Simoni (ITA)	Lampre–Daikin	89h 02' 58"
2	Abraham Olano (ESP)	ONCE–Eroski	+ 7' 31"
3	Unai Osa (ESP)	iBanesto.com	+ 8' 37"
4	Serhiy Honchar (UKR)	Liquigas–Pata	+ 9' 25"
5	José Azevedo (POR)	ONCE–Eroski	+ 9' 44"
6	Andrea Noè (ITA)	Mapei–Quick-Step	+ 10' 50"
7	Ivan Gotti (ITA)	Alessio	+ 10' 54"
8	Carlos Alberto Contreras (COL)	Selle Italia–Pacific	+ 11' 44"
9	Pietro Caucchioli (ITA)	Alessio	+ 13' 34"
10	Giuliano Figueras (ITA)	Ceramiche Panaria–Fiordo	+ 14' 08"
