= 2000 Giro d'Italia, Prologue to Stage 10 =

Cycling race stages

The 2000 Giro d'Italia was the 83rd edition of the Giro d'Italia, one of cycling's Grand Tours. The Giro began in Rome, with a Prologue individual time trial on 13 May, and Stage 10 occurred on 23 May with a stage to Padua. The race finished in Milan on 4 June.

== Prologue ==
13 May 2000 — Rome, 4.6 km (2.9 mi) (ITT)

Prologue result and general classification after Prologue

Rank	Rider	Team	Time
1	Jan Hruška (CZE)	Vitalicio Seguros	5' 38"
2	Paolo Savoldelli (ITA)	Saeco–Valli & Valli	s.t.
3	Bradley McGee (AUS)	Française des Jeux	+ 4"
4	Mario Cipollini (ITA)	Saeco–Valli & Valli	s.t.
5	José Luis Rubiera (ESP)	Kelme–Costa Blanca	+ 6"
6	José Enrique Gutiérrez (ESP)	Kelme–Costa Blanca	s.t.
7	Gabriele Missaglia (ITA)	Lampre–Daikin	s.t.
8	Mirco Gualdi (ITA)	Mobilvetta Design–Rossin	s.t.
9	Juan Carlos Domínguez (ESP)	Vitalicio Seguros	s.t.
10	Servais Knaven (NED)	Farm Frites	+ 8"

== Stage 1 ==
14 May 2000 — Rome to Terracina, 125 km (78 mi)

Stage 1 result

Rank	Rider	Team	Time
1	Ivan Quaranta (ITA)	Mobilvetta Design–Rossin	2h 46' 46"
2	Marco Zanotti (ITA)	Liquigas–Pata	s.t.
3	Steven de Jongh (NED)	Rabobank	s.t.
4	Silvio Martinello (ITA)	Team Polti	s.t.
5	Mario Cipollini (ITA)	Saeco–Valli & Valli	s.t.
6	Robbie McEwen (AUS)	Farm Frites	s.t.
7	Jeroen Blijlevens (NED)	Team Polti	s.t.
8	Tayeb Braikia (DEN)	Linda McCartney Racing Team	s.t.
9	Moreno Di Biase (ITA)	Cantina Tollo–Regain	s.t.
10	Luca Cei (ITA)	Ceramica Panaria–Gaerne	s.t.

General classification after Stage 1

Rank	Rider	Team	Time
1	Mario Cipollini (ITA)	Saeco–Valli & Valli	2h 52' 22"
2	Jan Hruška (CZE)	Vitalicio Seguros	+ 2"
3	Paolo Savoldelli (ITA)	Saeco–Valli & Valli	s.t.
4	Bradley McGee (AUS)	Française des Jeux	+ 6"
5	José Luis Rubiera (ESP)	Kelme–Costa Blanca	s.t.
6	José Enrique Gutiérrez (ESP)	Kelme–Costa Blanca	s.t.
7	Gabriele Missaglia (ITA)	Lampre–Daikin	+ 9"
8	Mirco Gualdi (ITA)	Mobilvetta Design–Rossin	s.t.
9	Juan Carlos Domínguez (ESP)	Vitalicio Seguros	s.t.
10	Servais Knaven (NED)	Farm Frites	+ 10"

== Stage 2 ==
15 May 2000 — Terracina to Maddaloni, 225 km (140 mi)

Stage 2 result

Rank	Rider	Team	Time
1	Cristian Moreni (ITA)	Liquigas–Pata	6h 15' 18"
2	Matteo Tosatto (ITA)	Fassa Bortolo	+ 5"
3	Karsten Kroon (NED)	Rabobank	s.t.
4	José Enrique Gutiérrez (ESP)	Kelme–Costa Blanca	+ 6"
5	Elio Aggiano (ITA)	Vitalicio Seguros	s.t.
6	Hernán Buenahora (COL)	Aguardiente Néctar–Selle Italia	+ 7"
7	Andrea Noè (ITA)	Mapei–Quick-Step	s.t.
8	Matthew White (AUS)	Vini Caldirola–Sidermec	+ 25"
9	Mariano Piccoli (ITA)	Lampre–Daikin	+ 29"
10	Jeroen Blijlevens (NED)	Team Polti	s.t.

General classification after Stage 2

Rank	Rider	Team	Time
1	Cristian Moreni (ITA)	Liquigas–Pata	9h 07' 43"
2	Matteo Tosatto (ITA)	Fassa Bortolo	+ 3"
3	José Enrique Gutiérrez (ESP)	Kelme–Costa Blanca	+ 11"
4	Karsten Kroon (NED)	Rabobank	+ 13"
5	Andrea Noè (ITA)	Mapei–Quick-Step	+ 22"
6	Mario Cipollini (ITA)	Saeco–Valli & Valli	+ 26"
7	Jan Hruška (CZE)	Vitalicio Seguros	+ 28"
8	Paolo Savoldelli (ITA)	Saeco–Valli & Valli	s.t.
9	Elio Aggiano (ITA)	Vitalicio Seguros	s.t.
10	Hernán Buenahora (COL)	Aguardiente Néctar–Selle Italia	s.t.

== Stage 3 ==
16 May 2000 — Paestum to Scalea, 177 km (110 mi)

Stage 3 result

Rank	Rider	Team	Time
1	Ján Svorada (CZE)	Lampre–Daikin	4h 44' 36"
2	Guido Trenti (USA)	Cantina Tollo–Regain	s.t.
3	Miguel Ángel Martín Perdiguero (ESP)	Vitalicio Seguros	s.t.
4	Matteo Tosatto (ITA)	Fassa Bortolo	s.t.
5	Ciarán Power (IRL)	Linda McCartney Racing Team	s.t.
6	Mario Manzoni (ITA)	Mobilvetta Design–Rossin	s.t.
7	Mauro Gerosa (ITA)	Amica Chips–Tacconi Sport	s.t.
8	Cristian Moreni (ITA)	Liquigas–Pata	s.t.
9	Biagio Conte (ITA)	Saeco–Valli & Valli	s.t.
10	Ángel Vicioso (ESP)	Kelme–Costa Blanca	s.t.

General classification after Stage 3

Rank	Rider	Team	Time
1	Cristian Moreni (ITA)	Liquigas–Pata	13h 52' 19"
2	Matteo Tosatto (ITA)	Fassa Bortolo	+ 1"
3	José Enrique Gutiérrez (ESP)	Kelme–Costa Blanca	+ 11"
4	Karsten Kroon (NED)	Rabobank	+ 13"
5	Andrea Noè (ITA)	Mapei–Quick-Step	+ 22"
6	Mario Cipollini (ITA)	Saeco–Valli & Valli	+ 26"
7	Jan Hruška (CZE)	Vitalicio Seguros	+ 28"
8	Paolo Savoldelli (ITA)	Saeco–Valli & Valli	s.t.
9	Hernán Buenahora (COL)	Aguardiente Néctar–Selle Italia	s.t.
10	José Luis Rubiera (ESP)	Kelme–Costa Blanca	+ 34"

== Stage 4 ==
17 May 2000 — Scalea to Matera, 233 km (145 mi)

Stage 4 result

Rank	Rider	Team	Time
1	Mario Cipollini (ITA)	Saeco–Valli & Valli	6h 16' 58"
2	Dimitri Konyshev (RUS)	Fassa Bortolo	s.t.
3	Silvio Martinello (ITA)	Team Polti	s.t.
4	Miguel Ángel Martín Perdiguero (ESP)	Vitalicio Seguros	s.t.
5	José Enrique Gutiérrez (ESP)	Kelme–Costa Blanca	s.t.
6	Alberto Ongarato (ITA)	Mobilvetta Design–Rossin	s.t.
7	Davide Rebellin (ITA)	Liquigas–Pata	s.t.
8	Ruber Marín (COL)	Aguardiente Néctar–Selle Italia	s.t.
9	Tayeb Braikia (DEN)	Linda McCartney Racing Team	s.t.
10	Yvon Ledanois (FRA)	Française des Jeux	s.t.

General classification after Stage 4

Rank	Rider	Team	Time
1	Cristian Moreni (ITA)	Liquigas–Pata	20h 09' 17"
2	Matteo Tosatto (ITA)	Fassa Bortolo	+ 1"
3	José Enrique Gutiérrez (ESP)	Kelme–Costa Blanca	+ 11"
4	Mario Cipollini (ITA)	Saeco–Valli & Valli	+ 14"
5	Andrea Noè (ITA)	Mapei–Quick-Step	+ 22"
6	Jan Hruška (CZE)	Vitalicio Seguros	+ 28"
7	Paolo Savoldelli (ITA)	Saeco–Valli & Valli	s.t.
8	Hernán Buenahora (COL)	Aguardiente Néctar–Selle Italia	s.t.
9	José Luis Rubiera (ESP)	Kelme–Costa Blanca	+ 34"
10	Mirco Gualdi (ITA)	Mobilvetta Design–Rossin	+ 35"

== Stage 5 ==
18 May 2000 — Matera to Peschici, 232 km (144 mi)

Stage 5 result

Rank	Rider	Team	Time
1	Danilo Di Luca (ITA)	Cantina Tollo–Regain	5h 19' 18"
2	Wladimir Belli (ITA)	Fassa Bortolo	s.t.
3	Paolo Lanfranchi (ITA)	Mapei–Quick-Step	s.t.
4	Francesco Casagrande (ITA)	Vini Caldirola–Sidermec	s.t.
5	Axel Merckx (BEL)	Mapei–Quick-Step	s.t.
6	Eddy Mazzoleni (ITA)	Team Polti	+ 2"
7	Massimo Giunti (ITA)	Cantina Tollo–Regain	s.t.
8	Mirco Gualdi (ITA)	Mobilvetta Design–Rossin	s.t.
9	Stefano Garzelli (ITA)	Mercatone Uno–Albacom	s.t.
10	Tomasz Brożyna (POL)	Banesto	s.t.

General classification after Stage 5

Rank	Rider	Team	Time
1	Matteo Tosatto (ITA)	Fassa Bortolo	25h 28' 34"
2	Cristian Moreni (ITA)	Liquigas–Pata	+ 3"
3	José Enrique Gutiérrez (ESP)	Kelme–Costa Blanca	+ 14"
4	Andrea Noè (ITA)	Mapei–Quick-Step	+ 25"
5	Danilo Di Luca (ITA)	Cantina Tollo–Regain	+ 31"
6	Jan Hruška (CZE)	Vitalicio Seguros	s.t.
7	Paolo Savoldelli (ITA)	Saeco–Valli & Valli	s.t.
8	Hernán Buenahora (COL)	Aguardiente Néctar–Selle Italia	s.t.
9	Wladimir Belli (ITA)	Fassa Bortolo	+ 35"
10	José Luis Rubiera (ESP)	Kelme–Costa Blanca	+ 37"

== Stage 6 ==
19 May 2000 — Peschici to Vasto, 170 km (110 mi)

Stage 6 result

Rank	Rider	Team	Time
1	Dimitri Konyshev (RUS)	Fassa Bortolo	4h 42' 49"
2	Jeroen Blijlevens (NED)	Team Polti	s.t.
3	Gabriele Missaglia (ITA)	Lampre–Daikin	s.t.
4	Fabiano Fontanelli (ITA)	Mercatone Uno–Albacom	s.t.
5	Moreno Di Biase (ITA)	Cantina Tollo–Regain	s.t.
6	Bradley McGee (AUS)	Française des Jeux	+ 2"
7	Ján Svorada (CZE)	Lampre–Daikin	s.t.
8	Vladimir Duma (UKR)	Ceramica Panaria–Gaerne	s.t.
9	Steven de Jongh (NED)	Rabobank	s.t.
10	Aart Vierhouten (NED)	Rabobank	s.t.

General classification after Stage 6

Rank	Rider	Team	Time
1	Matteo Tosatto (ITA)	Fassa Bortolo	30h 11' 23"
2	Cristian Moreni (ITA)	Liquigas–Pata	+ 3"
3	José Enrique Gutiérrez (ESP)	Kelme–Costa Blanca	+ 14"
4	Andrea Noè (ITA)	Mapei–Quick-Step	+ 25"
5	Danilo Di Luca (ITA)	Cantina Tollo–Regain	+ 31"
6	Jan Hruška (CZE)	Vitalicio Seguros	s.t.
7	Paolo Savoldelli (ITA)	Saeco–Valli & Valli	s.t.
8	Hernán Buenahora (COL)	Aguardiente Néctar–Selle Italia	s.t.
9	Wladimir Belli (ITA)	Fassa Bortolo	+ 35"
10	José Luis Rubiera (ESP)	Kelme–Costa Blanca	+ 37"

== Stage 7 ==
20 May 2000 — Vasto to Teramo, 182 km (113 mi)

Stage 7 result

Rank	Rider	Team	Time
1	David McKenzie (AUS)	Linda McCartney Racing Team	4h 38' 29"
2	Vladimir Duma (UKR)	Ceramica Panaria–Gaerne	+ 51"
3	Dimitri Konyshev (RUS)	Fassa Bortolo	s.t.
4	Silvio Martinello (ITA)	Team Polti	s.t.
5	Guido Trenti (USA)	Cantina Tollo–Regain	s.t.
6	Ivan Quaranta (ITA)	Mobilvetta Design–Rossin	s.t.
7	Miguel Ángel Martín Perdiguero (ESP)	Vitalicio Seguros	s.t.
8	Marco Zanotti (ITA)	Liquigas–Pata	s.t.
9	Ivan Basso (ITA)	Amica Chips–Tacconi Sport	s.t.
10	Mauro Gerosa (ITA)	Amica Chips–Tacconi Sport	s.t.

General classification after Stage 7

Rank	Rider	Team	Time
1	Matteo Tosatto (ITA)	Fassa Bortolo	34h 50' 43"
2	Cristian Moreni (ITA)	Liquigas–Pata	+ 3"
3	José Enrique Gutiérrez (ESP)	Kelme–Costa Blanca	+ 14"
4	Andrea Noè (ITA)	Mapei–Quick-Step	+ 25"
5	Danilo Di Luca (ITA)	Cantina Tollo–Regain	+ 31"
6	Jan Hruška (CZE)	Vitalicio Seguros	s.t.
7	Paolo Savoldelli (ITA)	Saeco–Valli & Valli	s.t.
8	Hernán Buenahora (COL)	Aguardiente Néctar–Selle Italia	s.t.
9	Wladimir Belli (ITA)	Fassa Bortolo	+ 35"
10	José Luis Rubiera (ESP)	Kelme–Costa Blanca	+ 37"

== Stage 8 ==
21 May 2000 — Corinaldo to Prato, 255 km (158 mi)

Stage 8 result

Rank	Rider	Team	Time
1	Axel Merckx (BEL)	Mapei–Quick-Step	7h 50' 25"
2	Max Sciandri (GBR)	Linda McCartney Racing Team	+ 6"
3	Filippo Casagrande (ITA)	Vini Caldirola–Sidermec	s.t.
4	Paolo Lanfranchi (ITA)	Mapei–Quick-Step	s.t.
5	José Enrique Gutiérrez (ESP)	Kelme–Costa Blanca	s.t.
6	Danilo Di Luca (ITA)	Cantina Tollo–Regain	s.t.
7	Iván Parra (COL)	Vitalicio Seguros	+ 8"
8	José Castelblanco (ESP)	Kelme–Costa Blanca	s.t.
9	Biagio Conte (ITA)	Saeco–Valli & Valli	+ 49"
10	Vladimir Duma (UKR)	Ceramica Panaria–Gaerne	s.t.

General classification after Stage 8

Rank	Rider	Team	Time
1	José Enrique Gutiérrez (ESP)	Kelme–Costa Blanca	42h 41' 28"
2	Axel Merckx (BEL)	Mapei–Quick-Step	+ 12"
3	Danilo Di Luca (ITA)	Cantina Tollo–Regain	+ 17"
4	Matteo Tosatto (ITA)	Fassa Bortolo	+ 29"
5	Cristian Moreni (ITA)	Liquigas–Pata	+ 32"
6	Francesco Casagrande (ITA)	Vini Caldirola–Sidermec	+ 40"
7	Iván Parra (COL)	Vitalicio Seguros	+ 45"
8	Andrea Noè (ITA)	Mapei–Quick-Step	+ 54"
9	José Castelblanco (ESP)	Kelme–Costa Blanca	+ 1' 00"
10	Jan Hruška (CZE)	Vitalicio Seguros	s.t.

== Stage 9 ==
22 May 2000 — Prato to Abetone, 140 km (87 mi)

Stage 9 result

Rank	Rider	Team	Time
1	Francesco Casagrande (ITA)	Vini Caldirola–Sidermec	4h 22' 58"
2	Stefano Garzelli (ITA)	Mercatone Uno–Albacom	+ 1' 39"
3	Dario Frigo (ITA)	Fassa Bortolo	s.t.
4	Gilberto Simoni (ITA)	Lampre–Daikin	s.t.
5	Danilo Di Luca (ITA)	Cantina Tollo–Regain	s.t.
6	Ivan Gotti (ITA)	Team Polti	s.t.
7	Pavel Tonkov (RUS)	Mapei–Quick-Step	+ 1' 41"
8	Wladimir Belli (ITA)	Fassa Bortolo	s.t.
9	Andrea Noè (ITA)	Mapei–Quick-Step	+ 1' 50"
10	Leonardo Piepoli (ITA)	Banesto	+ 1' 53"

General classification after Stage 9

Rank	Rider	Team	Time
1	Francesco Casagrande (ITA)	Vini Caldirola–Sidermec	47h 05' 31"
2	Danilo Di Luca (ITA)	Cantina Tollo–Regain	+ 51"
3	Andrea Noè (ITA)	Mapei–Quick-Step	+ 1' 39"
4	Stefano Garzelli (ITA)	Mercatone Uno–Albacom	s.t.
5	Dario Frigo (ITA)	Fassa Bortolo	+ 1' 40"
6	Wladimir Belli (ITA)	Fassa Bortolo	s.t.
7	Pavel Tonkov (RUS)	Mapei–Quick-Step	+ 1' 47"
8	Gilberto Simoni (ITA)	Lampre–Daikin	+ 1' 53"
9	Ivan Gotti (ITA)	Team Polti	+ 1' 55"
10	Leonardo Piepoli (ITA)	Banesto	+ 2' 21"

== Stage 10 ==
23 May 2000 — San Marcello Pistoiese to Padua, 257 km (160 mi)

Stage 10 result

Rank	Rider	Team	Time
1	Ivan Quaranta (ITA)	Mobilvetta Design–Rossin	6h 48' 07"
2	Ján Svorada (CZE)	Lampre–Daikin	s.t.
3	Mario Cipollini (ITA)	Saeco–Valli & Valli	s.t.
4	Marco Zanotti (ITA)	Liquigas–Pata	s.t.
5	Jeroen Blijlevens (NED)	Team Polti	s.t.
6	Luca Cei (ITA)	Ceramica Panaria–Gaerne	s.t.
7	Dimitri Konyshev (RUS)	Fassa Bortolo	s.t.
8	Fabrizio Guidi (ITA)	Française des Jeux	s.t.
9	Guido Trenti (USA)	Cantina Tollo–Regain	s.t.
10	Andrea Ferrigato (ITA)	Fassa Bortolo	s.t.

General classification after Stage 10

Rank	Rider	Team	Time
1	Francesco Casagrande (ITA)	Vini Caldirola–Sidermec	53h 53' 38"
2	Danilo Di Luca (ITA)	Cantina Tollo–Regain	+ 51"
3	Andrea Noè (ITA)	Mapei–Quick-Step	+ 1' 39"
4	Stefano Garzelli (ITA)	Mercatone Uno–Albacom	s.t.
5	Dario Frigo (ITA)	Fassa Bortolo	+ 1' 40"
6	Wladimir Belli (ITA)	Fassa Bortolo	s.t.
7	Pavel Tonkov (RUS)	Mapei–Quick-Step	+ 1' 47"
8	Gilberto Simoni (ITA)	Lampre–Daikin	+ 1' 53"
9	Ivan Gotti (ITA)	Team Polti	+ 1' 55"
10	Leonardo Piepoli (ITA)	Banesto	+ 2' 21"
