= 1999 Giro d'Italia, Stage 1 to Stage 11 =

Cycling race stages

The 1999 Giro d'Italia was the 82nd edition of the Giro d'Italia, one of cycling's Grand Tours. The Giro began in Agrigento, with a flat stage on 15 May, and Stage 11 occurred on 25 May with a stage to Cesenatico. The race finished in Milan on 6 June.

== Stage 1 ==
15 May 1999 — Agrigento to Modica, 175 km (109 mi)

Stage 1 result and general classification after Stage 1

Rank	Rider	Team	Time
1	Ivan Quaranta (ITA)	Mobilvetta Design–Northwave	4h 38' 51"
2	Jeroen Blijlevens (NED)	TVM–Farm Frites	s.t.
3	Mario Cipollini (ITA)	Saeco–Cannondale	s.t.
4	Guido Trenti (ITA)	Cantina Tollo–Alexia Alluminio	s.t.
5	Romāns Vainšteins (LAT)	Vini Caldirola	s.t.
6	Gabriele Missaglia (ITA)	Lampre–Daikin	s.t.
7	Fabrizio Guidi (ITA)	Team Polti	s.t.
8	Fabiano Fontanelli (ITA)	Mercatone Uno–Bianchi	s.t.
9	Ángel Edo (ESP)	Kelme–Costa Blanca	s.t.
10	Endrio Leoni (ITA)	Liquigas	s.t.

== Stage 2 ==
16 May 1999 — Noto to Catania, 133 km (83 mi)

Stage 2 result

Rank	Rider	Team	Time
1	Mario Cipollini (ITA)	Saeco–Cannondale	3h 18' 12"
2	Jeroen Blijlevens (NED)	TVM–Farm Frites	s.t.
3	Dario Pieri (ITA)	Navigare–Gaerne	s.t.
4	Gabriele Missaglia (ITA)	Lampre–Daikin	s.t.
5	Ivan Quaranta (ITA)	Mobilvetta Design–Northwave	s.t.
6	Massimiliano Gentili (ITA)	Cantina Tollo–Alexia Alluminio	s.t.
7	Fabrizio Guidi (ITA)	Team Polti	s.t.
8	Gian Matteo Fagnini (ITA)	Saeco–Cannondale	s.t.
9	Gabriele Balducci (ITA)	Navigare–Gaerne	s.t.
10	Andrea Noè (ITA)	Mapei–Quick-Step	s.t.

General classification after Stage 2

Rank	Rider	Team	Time
1	Mario Cipollini (ITA)	Saeco–Cannondale	7h 56' 43"
2	Jeroen Blijlevens (NED)	TVM–Farm Frites	+ 4"
3	Ivan Quaranta (ITA)	Mobilvetta Design–Northwave	+ 8"
4	Massimo Apollonio (ITA)	Vini Caldirola	+ 14"
5	Dario Pieri (ITA)	Navigare–Gaerne	+ 16"
6	Paolo Valoti (ITA)	Mobilvetta Design–Northwave	s.t.
7	Gian Matteo Fagnini (ITA)	Saeco–Cannondale	+ 18"
8	Gabriele Missaglia (ITA)	Lampre–Daikin	+ 20"
9	Fabrizio Guidi (ITA)	Team Polti	s.t.
10	Ángel Edo (ESP)	Kelme–Costa Blanca	s.t.

== Stage 3 ==
17 May 1999 — Catania to Messina, 176 km (109 mi)

Stage 3 result

Rank	Rider	Team	Time
1	Jeroen Blijlevens (NED)	TVM–Farm Frites	4h 53' 49"
2	Ján Svorada (CZE)	Lampre–Daikin	s.t.
3	Massimo Strazzer (ITA)	Mobilvetta Design–Northwave	s.t.
4	Nicola Minali (ITA)	Cantina Tollo–Alexia Alluminio	s.t.
5	Endrio Leoni (ITA)	Liquigas	s.t.
6	Miguel Ángel Martín Perdiguero (ESP)	ONCE–Deutsche Bank	s.t.
7	Gabriele Balducci (ITA)	Navigare–Gaerne	s.t.
8	Fabrizio Guidi (ITA)	Team Polti	s.t.
9	Alexander Gontchenkov (RUS)	Ballan–Alessio	s.t.
10	Alain Turicchia (ITA)	Riso Scotti–Vinavil	s.t.

General classification after Stage 3

Rank	Rider	Team	Time
1	Jeroen Blijlevens (NED)	TVM–Farm Frites	12h 50' 24"
2	Mario Cipollini (ITA)	Saeco–Cannondale	+ 8"
3	Ivan Quaranta (ITA)	Mobilvetta Design–Northwave	+ 16"
4	Matteo Tosatto (ITA)	Ballan–Alessio	+ 22"
5	Massimo Apollonio (ITA)	Vini Caldirola	s.t.
6	Dario Pieri (ITA)	Navigare–Gaerne	+ 24"
7	Mariano Piccoli (ITA)	Lampre–Daikin	s.t.
8	Paolo Valoti (ITA)	Mobilvetta Design–Northwave	s.t.
9	Gian Matteo Fagnini (ITA)	Saeco–Cannondale	+ 26"
10	Fabrizio Guidi (ITA)	Team Polti	+ 28"

== Stage 4 ==
18 May 1999 — Vibo Valentia to Terme Luigiane, 186 km (116 mi)

Stage 4 result

Rank	Rider	Team	Time
1	Laurent Jalabert (FRA)	ONCE–Deutsche Bank	4h 23' 49"
2	Gian Matteo Fagnini (ITA)	Saeco–Cannondale	s.t.
3	Davide Rebellin (ITA)	Team Polti	s.t.
4	Oscar Camenzind (SUI)	Lampre–Daikin	s.t.
5	Alexander Gontchenkov (RUS)	Ballan–Alessio	s.t.
6	Romāns Vainšteins (LAT)	Vini Caldirola	s.t.
7	Paolo Savoldelli (ITA)	Saeco–Cannondale	s.t.
8	Viatcheslav Ekimov (RUS)	Amica Chips–Costa de Almeria	s.t.
9	Alain Turicchia (ITA)	Riso Scotti–Vinavil	s.t.
10	Enrico Zaina (ITA)	Mercatone Uno–Bianchi	s.t.

General classification after Stage 4

Rank	Rider	Team	Time
1	Jeroen Blijlevens (NED)	TVM–Farm Frites	17h 14' 11"
2	Laurent Jalabert (FRA)	ONCE–Deutsche Bank	+ 18"
3	Gian Matteo Fagnini (ITA)	Saeco–Cannondale	+ 20"
4	Matteo Tosatto (ITA)	Ballan–Alessio	+ 24"
5	Fabrizio Guidi (ITA)	Team Polti	+ 26"
6	Mariano Piccoli (ITA)	Lampre–Daikin	s.t.
7	Davide Rebellin (ITA)	Team Polti	s.t.
8	Romāns Vainšteins (LAT)	Vini Caldirola	+ 30"
9	Ángel Edo (ESP)	Kelme–Costa Blanca	s.t.
10	Oscar Camenzind (SUI)	Lampre–Daikin	s.t.

== Stage 5 ==
19 May 1999 — Terme Luigiane to Massiccio del Sirino, 147 km (91 mi)

Stage 5 result

Rank	Rider	Team	Time
1	José Jaime González (ESP)	Kelme–Costa Blanca	4h 11' 47"
2	Danilo Di Luca (ITA)	Cantina Tollo–Alexia Alluminio	+ 5"
3	Laurent Jalabert (FRA)	ONCE–Deutsche Bank	+ 6"
4	Marco Pantani (ITA)	Mercatone Uno–Bianchi	s.t.
5	Ivan Gotti (ITA)	Team Polti	s.t.
6	Paolo Savoldelli (ITA)	Saeco–Cannondale	s.t.
7	Dario Frigo (ITA)	Saeco–Cannondale	s.t.
8	Davide Rebellin (ITA)	Team Polti	+ 8"
9	Gilberto Simoni (ITA)	Ballan–Alessio	+ 9"
10	Oscar Camenzind (SUI)	Lampre–Daikin	+ 16"

General classification after Stage 5

Rank	Rider	Team	Time
1	Laurent Jalabert (FRA)	ONCE–Deutsche Bank	21h 26' 18"
2	Danilo Di Luca (ITA)	Cantina Tollo–Alexia Alluminio	+ 7"
3	Davide Rebellin (ITA)	Team Polti	+ 14"
4	Paolo Savoldelli (ITA)	Saeco–Cannondale	+ 16"
5	Marco Pantani (ITA)	Mercatone Uno–Bianchi	s.t.
6	Dario Frigo (ITA)	Saeco–Cannondale	s.t.
7	Ivan Gotti (ITA)	Team Polti	s.t.
8	Gilberto Simoni (ITA)	Ballan–Alessio	+ 19"
9	Oscar Camenzind (SUI)	Lampre–Daikin	+ 26"
10	Niklas Axelsson (SWE)	Navigare–Gaerne	s.t.

== Stage 6 ==
20 May 1999 — Lauria to Foggia, 257 km (160 mi)

Stage 6 result

Rank	Rider	Team	Time
1	Romāns Vainšteins (LAT)	Vini Caldirola	5h 55' 43"
2	Fabrizio Guidi (ITA)	Team Polti	s.t.
3	Gabriele Missaglia (ITA)	Lampre–Daikin	s.t.
4	Matteo Tosatto (ITA)	Ballan–Alessio	s.t.
5	Paolo Bettini (ITA)	Mapei–Quick-Step	s.t.
6	Guido Trenti (ITA)	Cantina Tollo–Alexia Alluminio	s.t.
7	Marco Magnani (ITA)	Cantina Tollo–Alexia Alluminio	s.t.
8	Alessandro Petacchi (ITA)	Navigare–Gaerne	s.t.
9	Jeroen Blijlevens (NED)	TVM–Farm Frites	s.t.
10	Giuliano Figueras (ITA)	Mapei–Quick-Step	s.t.

General classification after Stage 6

Rank	Rider	Team	Time
1	Laurent Jalabert (FRA)	ONCE–Deutsche Bank	27h 22' 01"
2	Danilo Di Luca (ITA)	Cantina Tollo–Alexia Alluminio	+ 7"
3	Davide Rebellin (ITA)	Team Polti	+ 14"
4	Paolo Savoldelli (ITA)	Saeco–Cannondale	+ 16"
5	Marco Pantani (ITA)	Mercatone Uno–Bianchi	s.t.
6	Dario Frigo (ITA)	Saeco–Cannondale	s.t.
7	Ivan Gotti (ITA)	Team Polti	s.t.
8	Gilberto Simoni (ITA)	Ballan–Alessio	+ 19"
9	Oscar Camenzind (SUI)	Lampre–Daikin	+ 26"
10	Niklas Axelsson (SWE)	Navigare–Gaerne	s.t.

== Stage 7 ==
21 May 1999 — Foggia to Lanciano, 153 km (95 mi)

Stage 7 result

Rank	Rider	Team	Time
1	Jeroen Blijlevens (NED)	TVM–Farm Frites	4h 12' 06"
2	Romāns Vainšteins (LAT)	Vini Caldirola	s.t.
3	Fabrizio Guidi (ITA)	Team Polti	s.t.
4	Paolo Bettini (ITA)	Mapei–Quick-Step	s.t.
5	Mariano Piccoli (ITA)	Lampre–Daikin	s.t.
6	Alessandro Petacchi (ITA)	Navigare–Gaerne	s.t.
7	Gabriele Balducci (ITA)	Navigare–Gaerne	s.t.
8	Gabriele Missaglia (ITA)	Lampre–Daikin	s.t.
9	Ángel Edo (ESP)	Kelme–Costa Blanca	s.t.
10	Gian Matteo Fagnini (ITA)	Saeco–Cannondale	s.t.

General classification after Stage 7

Rank	Rider	Team	Time
1	Laurent Jalabert (FRA)	ONCE–Deutsche Bank	31h 34' 07"
2	Danilo Di Luca (ITA)	Cantina Tollo–Alexia Alluminio	+ 7"
3	Paolo Savoldelli (ITA)	Saeco–Cannondale	+ 16"
4	Davide Rebellin (ITA)	Team Polti	+ 20"
5	Marco Pantani (ITA)	Mercatone Uno–Bianchi	+ 22"
6	Dario Frigo (ITA)	Saeco–Cannondale	s.t.
7	Ivan Gotti (ITA)	Team Polti	s.t.
8	Gilberto Simoni (ITA)	Ballan–Alessio	+ 25"
9	Sergei Ivanov (RUS)	TVM–Farm Frites	+ 31"
10	Oscar Camenzind (SUI)	Lampre–Daikin	+ 32"

== Stage 8 ==
22 May 1999 — Pescara to Gran Sasso d'Italia, 253 km (157 mi)

Stage 8 result

Rank	Rider	Team	Time
1	Marco Pantani (ITA)	Mercatone Uno–Bianchi	7h 09' 00"
2	José María Jiménez (ESP)	Banesto	+ 23"
3	Alex Zülle (SUI)	Banesto	+ 26"
4	Ivan Gotti (ITA)	Team Polti	+ 33"
5	Andrea Noè (ITA)	Mapei–Quick-Step	+ 42"
6	Daniel Clavero (ESP)	Vitalicio Seguros	s.t.
7	Dario Frigo (ITA)	Saeco–Cannondale	s.t.
8	Serhiy Honchar (UKR)	Vini Caldirola	+ 58"
9	Massimo Codol (ITA)	Lampre–Daikin	+ 1' 00"
10	Oscar Camenzind (SUI)	Lampre–Daikin	s.t.

General classification after Stage 8

Rank	Rider	Team	Time
1	Marco Pantani (ITA)	Mercatone Uno–Bianchi	38h 43' 17"
2	José María Jiménez (ESP)	Banesto	+ 38"
3	Ivan Gotti (ITA)	Team Polti	+ 45"
4	Dario Frigo (ITA)	Saeco–Cannondale	+ 54"
5	Laurent Jalabert (FRA)	ONCE–Deutsche Bank	+ 55"
6	Andrea Noè (ITA)	Mapei–Quick-Step	+ 1' 05"
7	Daniel Clavero (ESP)	Vitalicio Seguros	s.t.
8	Oscar Camenzind (SUI)	Lampre–Daikin	+ 1' 22"
9	Niklas Axelsson (SWE)	Navigare–Gaerne	s.t.
10	Danilo Di Luca (ITA)	Cantina Tollo–Alexia Alluminio	+ 1' 30"

== Stage 9 ==
23 May 1999 — Ancona to Ancona, 32 km (20 mi) (ITT)

Stage 9 result

Rank	Rider	Team	Time
1	Laurent Jalabert (FRA)	ONCE–Deutsche Bank	40' 36"
2	Serhiy Honchar (UKR)	Vini Caldirola	+ 25"
3	Marco Pantani (ITA)	Mercatone Uno–Bianchi	+ 55"
4	Oscar Camenzind (SUI)	Lampre–Daikin	+ 57"
5	Dario Frigo (ITA)	Saeco–Cannondale	+ 59"
6	Daniel Clavero (ESP)	Vitalicio Seguros	+ 1' 00"
7	Alex Zülle (SUI)	Banesto	+ 1' 15"
8	Ivan Gotti (ITA)	Team Polti	+ 1' 23"
9	Niklas Axelsson (SWE)	Navigare–Gaerne	+ 1' 38"
10	Andrei Zintchenko (RUS)	Vitalicio Seguros	+ 2' 00"

General classification after Stage 9

Rank	Rider	Team	Time
1	Laurent Jalabert (FRA)	ONCE–Deutsche Bank	39h 24' 49"
2	Marco Pantani (ITA)	Mercatone Uno–Bianchi	s.t.
3	Dario Frigo (ITA)	Saeco–Cannondale	+ 58"
4	Serhiy Honchar (UKR)	Vini Caldirola	+ 1' 09"
5	Ivan Gotti (ITA)	Team Polti	+ 1' 13"
6	Daniel Clavero (ESP)	Vitalicio Seguros	+ 1' 18"
7	Oscar Camenzind (SUI)	Lampre–Daikin	+ 1' 24"
8	Alex Zülle (SUI)	Banesto	+ 2' 04"
9	Niklas Axelsson (SWE)	Navigare–Gaerne	+ 2' 05"
10	Andrea Noè (ITA)	Mapei–Quick-Step	+ 2' 19"

== Stage 10 ==
24 May 1999 — Ancona to Sansepolcro, 189 km (117 mi)

Stage 10 result

Rank	Rider	Team	Time
1	Mario Cipollini (ITA)	Saeco–Cannondale	4h 28' 24"
2	Ivan Quaranta (ITA)	Mobilvetta Design–Northwave	s.t.
3	Massimo Strazzer (ITA)	Mobilvetta Design–Northwave	s.t.
4	Francesco Arazzi (ITA)	Amica Chips–Costa de Almeria	s.t.
5	Endrio Leoni (ITA)	Liquigas	s.t.
6	Serguei Smetanine (RUS)	Vitalicio Seguros	s.t.
7	Gabriele Balducci (ITA)	Navigare–Gaerne	s.t.
8	Jeroen Blijlevens (NED)	TVM–Farm Frites	s.t.
9	Fabrizio Guidi (ITA)	Team Polti	s.t.
10	Alessandro Petacchi (ITA)	Navigare–Gaerne	s.t.

General classification after Stage 10

Rank	Rider	Team	Time
1	Laurent Jalabert (FRA)	ONCE–Deutsche Bank	43h 53' 12"
2	Marco Pantani (ITA)	Mercatone Uno–Bianchi	s.t.
3	Dario Frigo (ITA)	Saeco–Cannondale	+ 58"
4	Serhiy Honchar (UKR)	Vini Caldirola	+ 1' 09"
5	Ivan Gotti (ITA)	Team Polti	+ 1' 13"
6	Daniel Clavero (ESP)	Vitalicio Seguros	+ 1' 18"
7	Oscar Camenzind (SUI)	Lampre–Daikin	+ 1' 24"
8	Alex Zülle (SUI)	Banesto	+ 2' 04"
9	Niklas Axelsson (SWE)	Navigare–Gaerne	+ 2' 05"
10	Andrea Noè (ITA)	Mapei–Quick-Step	+ 2' 19"

== Stage 11 ==
25 May 1999 — Sansepolcro to Cesenatico, 125 km (78 mi)

Stage 11 result

Rank	Rider	Team	Time
1	Ivan Quaranta (ITA)	Mobilvetta Design–Northwave	2h 53' 41"
2	Mario Cipollini (ITA)	Saeco–Cannondale	s.t.
3	Ján Svorada (CZE)	Lampre–Daikin	s.t.
4	Jeroen Blijlevens (NED)	TVM–Farm Frites	s.t.
5	Endrio Leoni (ITA)	Liquigas	s.t.
6	Matteo Tosatto (ITA)	Ballan–Alessio	s.t.
7	Dario Pieri (ITA)	Navigare–Gaerne	s.t.
8	Massimo Strazzer (ITA)	Mobilvetta Design–Northwave	s.t.
9	Luca Cei (ITA)	Navigare–Gaerne	s.t.
10	Marco Gili (ITA)	Amica Chips–Costa de Almeria	s.t.

General classification after Stage 11

Rank	Rider	Team	Time
1	Laurent Jalabert (FRA)	ONCE–Deutsche Bank	46h 46' 49"
2	Marco Pantani (ITA)	Mercatone Uno–Bianchi	+ 4"
3	Dario Frigo (ITA)	Saeco–Cannondale	+ 1' 02"
4	Serhiy Honchar (UKR)	Vini Caldirola	+ 1' 13"
5	Ivan Gotti (ITA)	Team Polti	+ 1' 17"
6	Daniel Clavero (ESP)	Vitalicio Seguros	+ 1' 22"
7	Oscar Camenzind (SUI)	Lampre–Daikin	+ 1' 28"
8	Alex Zülle (SUI)	Banesto	+ 2' 08"
9	Niklas Axelsson (SWE)	Navigare–Gaerne	+ 2' 09"
10	Andrea Noè (ITA)	Mapei–Quick-Step	+ 2' 23"
