= 1995 Giro del Trentino =

Race details
- Dates: 27–29 April 1995
- Stages: 3
- Distance: 524 km (325.6 mi)
- Winning time: 13h 43' 49"

Results
	Winner	Heinz Imboden (SUI)
	Second	Mariano Piccoli (ITA)
	Third	Francesco Frattini (ITA)

The 1995 Giro del Trentino was the 19th edition of the Tour of the Alps cycle race and was held on 27 April to 29 April 1995. The race started in Riva del Garda and finished in Arco. The race was won by Heinz Imboden.

== General classification ==
Final general classification

Rank	Rider	Time
1	Heinz Imboden (SUI)	13h 43' 49"
2	Mariano Piccoli (ITA)	+ 1' 06"
3	Francesco Frattini (ITA)	+ 1' 21"
4	Pavel Tonkov (RUS)	+ 1' 37"
5	Ivan Gotti (ITA)	+ 3' 02"
6	Massimo Podenzana (ITA)	+ 3' 02"
7	Enrico Zaina (ITA)	+ 3' 30"
8	Stefano Cattai (ITA)	+ 3' 30"
9	Davide Rebellin (ITA)	+ 4' 17"
10	Evgeni Berzin (RUS)	+ 4' 21"
