= Ellis Rastelli =

Italian cyclist

Personal information
- Born: 18 January 1975 (age 51) Cortemaggiore, Italy

Cycling career
- Sport: Cycling
- Role: Rider

Ellis Rastelli (born 18 January 1975) is an Italian former professional racing cyclist. He rode in four editions of the Giro d'Italia.

== Major results ==
1998
1st Stage 5 Regio-Tour
1999
1st Stage 2 Euskal Bizikleta
7th Overall GP Kranj
2001
1st Stage 1 Giro d'Italia
3rd Giro del Friuli
2004
8th Overall Post Danmark Rundt
