= Mauro Gerosa =

Italian cyclist

Personal information
- Born: October 9, 1974 (age 52) Oggiono

Cycling career
- Sport: Cycling
- Current team: Retired
- Discipline: Road
- Role: Rider

Amateur team
- 1999: Mapei

Professional teams
- 2000: Amica Chips
- 2001–2004: Vini Caldirola
- 2005: Liquigas–Bianchi
- 2006: Miche

Mauro Gerosa (born October 9, 1974, in Oggiono) is a former Italian racing cyclist.

== Major results ==
2003
6th Firenze–Pistoia
2004
3rd Road race, National Road Championships
6th Grand Prix of Aargau Canton
10th Coppa Ugo Agostoni

== Grand Tour results ==
=== Tour de France ===
- 2005: 137

=== Vuelta a España ===
- 2004: 95
- 2005: 103

=== Giro d'Italia ===
- 2000: 97
- 2001: 77
- 2002: 102
- 2003: 79
- 2004: 62
