= José Azevedo =

Portuguese cyclist (born 1973)

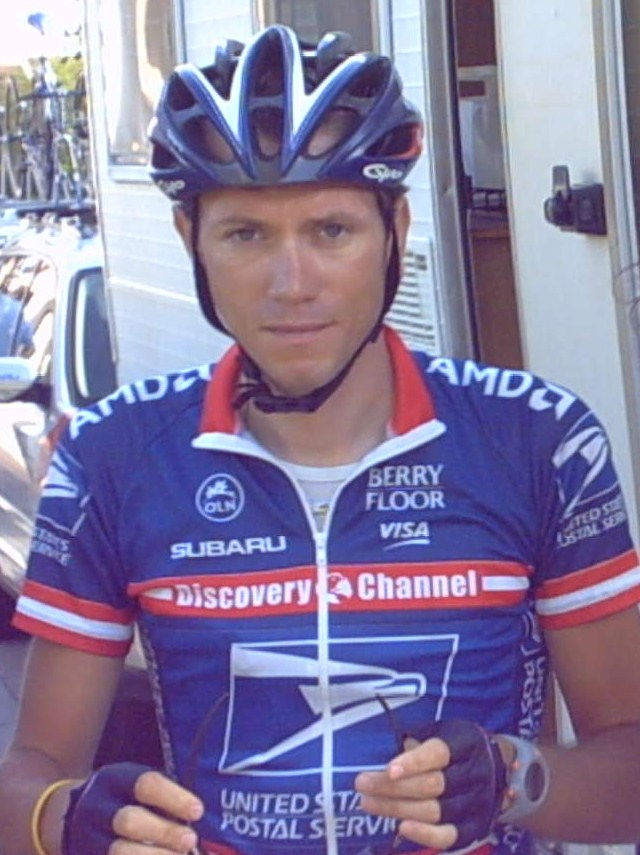
- Azevedo in 2004

Personal information
- Full name: José Bento Azevedo Carvalho
- Nickname: The Ace
- Born: 19 September 1973 (age 53) Vila do Conde, Portugal
- Height: 1.70 m (5 ft 7 in)
- Weight: 61 kg (134 lb; 9.6 st)

Cycling career
- Sport: Cycling
- Discipline: Road
- Role: Rider (retired); Team manager
- Rider type: Climbing specialist

Professional teams
- 1994–1995: Recer–Boavista
- 1996–2000: Maia–Jumbo–CIN
- 2001–2003: ONCE–Eroski
- 2004–2006: U.S. Postal Service
- 2007–2008: Benfica

Managerial teams
- 2010–2011: Team RadioShack
- 2012–2013: RadioShack–Nissan
- 2014–2019: Team Katusha

Major wins
- Grand Tours Tour de France 2 TTT stages (2004, 2005) Vuelta a España 1 TTT stages (2002) Deutschland Tour, 1 stage One-day races and Classics National Time Trial Championships (1996, 1997, 2001)

José Bento Azevedo Carvalho (born 19 September 1973) is a Portuguese retired road racing cyclist, and most recently, general manager of UCI WorldTeam Team Katusha–Alpecin. During his racing career, Azevedo rode for ONCE–Eroski between 2001 and 2003 and for U.S. Postal Service between 2004 and 2006.

== Career ==
Born in Vila do Conde, Azevedo's principal career successes were fifth overall at the 2001 Giro d'Italia, sixth overall at the 2002 Tour de France and fifth overall at the 2004 Tour de France. He also made a second place in the Germany Tour, just behind Michael Rogers. He won the queen-stage of the German competition.

Until 2005 he was a renowned domestique; his primary role was to serve as Lance Armstrong's lieutenant in mountain stages, specifically stages in the Pyrenees Mountains. Lance Armstrong described him as the best lieutenant he has ever had. Nicknamed "The Ace", he moved to US Postal (which became the now-defunct Discovery Channel Pro Cycling Team) from Team ONCE (also defunct) in 2004.

In 2006 Azevedo wore the #1 background during the Tour de France and he claimed the highest finish in the general classification amongst his Discovery Channel teammates. Azevedo finished 18th overall, 37 minutes and 11 seconds behind race winner Óscar Pereiro, following the disqualification of apparent winner Floyd Landis.

To be able to spend more time with his family, Azevedo opted for a home team. He became the leader of the Benfica cycling team and aimed to win the Tour of Portugal. Azevedo finished his career at the end of the Tour of Portugal 2008.

In 2013 he was the directeur sportif for Chris Horner when he won the Vuelta.

== Career achievements ==
=== Major results ===
1994
6th Overall Volta ao Algarve
1995
1st Prologue Grande Prémio Jornal de Notícias
4th Overall Volta ao Algarve
8th Overall Volta a Portugal
1996
1st Time trial, National Road Championships
1st Overall Grande Prémio Internacional Costa Azul
5th Overall Volta a Portugal
1997
1st Time trial, National Road Championships
1st Stage 11 (ITT) Volta a Portugal
6th Overall Volta ao Alentejo
1998
1st Overall Troféu Joaquim Agostinho

1st Stages 3 & 5

1st Stage 5 (ITT) Volta a Portugal
4th Overall Volta ao Algarve
7th Overall Volta ao Alentejo
1999
1st Stage 4 Troféu Joaquim Agostinho
3rd Time trial, National Road Championships
4th Overall Grande Prémio Jornal de Notícias
5th Overall Volta ao Alentejo
8th Overall Volta a Portugal
9th Subida al Naranco
10th Overall Volta ao Algarve
2000
1st Overall G.P. Portugal Telecom
1st Prologue GP Sport Noticias
2nd Overall Volta ao Algarve

1st Stage 5

2nd Overall Grande Prémio Jornal de Notícias
4th Overall Volta a Portugal
4th Overall Vuelta a Asturias

1st Stage 4

2001
1st Time trial, National Road Championships
2nd Overall Volta ao Algarve

1st Stage 3

5th Overall Paris–Nice
5th Overall Giro d'Italia
8th Overall Tour of the Basque Country
2002
1st Stage 1 (TTT) Vuelta a España
3rd Overall Euskal Bizikleta
3rd Overall Grand Prix du Midi Libre
5th La Flèche Wallonne
6th Overall Tour de France
8th Klasika Primavera
2003
2nd Overall Deutschland Tour

1st Stage 5

2004
1st Stage 4 (TTT) Tour de France
5th Overall Tour de France
10th Overall Paris–Nice
2005
1st Stage 4 (TTT) Tour de France
10th Overall Tour de Georgia
2006
4th Overall Critérium du Dauphiné Libéré
5th Overall Vuelta a Castilla y León
6th Overall Paris–Nice
10th Overall Tour of the Basque Country
2007
1st Stage 4 GP CTT Correios de Portugal
2nd Time trial, National Road Championships
6th Overall Tour de Luxembourg
6th Overall Volta a Portugal
2008
6th Overall GP CTT Correios de Portugal
9th Overall Vuelta a Asturias

=== Grand Tour general classification results timeline ===
Grand Tour	1996	1997	1998	1999	2000	2001	2002	2003	2004	2005	2006
Giro d'Italia	—	—	—	—	—	5	—	—	—	—	—
Tour de France	—	—	—	—	—	—	6	26	5	30	17
Vuelta a España	DNF	DNF	—	—	—	—	34	DNF	—	DNF	—
