= Jeroen Blijlevens =

Dutch road bicycle racer

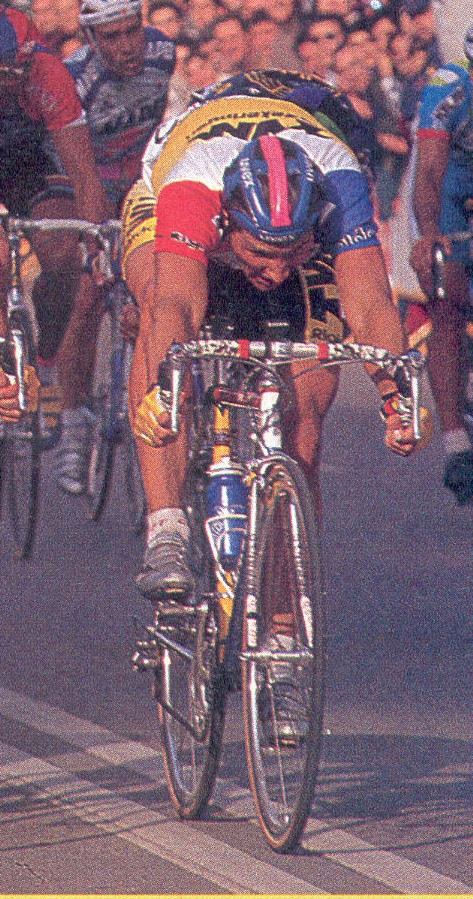

Personal information
- Full name: Jeroen Johannes Hendrikus Blijlevens
- Nickname: Jerommeke
- Born: 29 December 1971 (age 54) Gilze en Rijen, the Netherlands
- Height: 1.72 m (5 ft 8 in)
- Weight: 70 kg (154 lb; 11 st 0 lb)

Cycling career
- Sport: Cycling
- Discipline: Road
- Role: Rider (retired); Directeur sportif
- Rider type: Sprinter

Professional teams
- 1994–1999: TVM–Farm Frites
- 2000: Team Polti
- 2001: Lotto–Adecco
- 2002: Domo–Farm Frites
- 2003–2004: BankGiroLoterij–Batavus

Managerial teams
- 2005–2007: Eurogifts.com
- 2010–2012: Nederland bloeit
- 2013: Blanco Pro Cycling
- 2017–2020: CCC - Liv

Major wins
- Grand Tours Tour de France 4 individual stages (1995, 1996, 1997, 1998) Giro d'Italia 2 individual stages (1999) Vuelta a España 5 individual stages (1995, 1996, 1998, 1999)

Jeroen Johannes Hendrikus Blijlevens (born 29 December 1971) is a retired road bicycle racer from the Netherlands, who was a professional rider from 1994 to 2004. He most recently worked as a directeur sportif for UCI Women's WorldTeam CCC - Liv, and has also worked as a cycling co-commentator at Eurosport Netherlands.

Nicknamed Jerommeke, he was one of Holland's leading sprinters in the 1990s, claiming a total of 11 stage victories across the three Grand Tours (Tour de France, Vuelta a España and Giro d'Italia). He won a total number of 74 races in his professional career.

== Biography ==
Blijlevens was born in Gilze en Rijen, North Brabant in 1971, as a son of a shoe sales man. In 1990, he won his first race as an amateur. He scored nineteen victories as an amateur, and at the end of 1993 was signed by Cees Priem for TVM–Bison Kit. Blijlevens showed good results in his first years, and in 1995 was selected to ride the Tour de France, where he won the fifth stage. Blijlevens, not a good climber, left the race before the Alps.

In 1996, Blijlevens again won a stage in the Tour de France. In 1997, he finished second to Erik Zabel in the sixth stage of the Tour de France, but when the jury disqualified Zabel for irregular sprinting, the victory was given to Blijlevens. In 1998 Blijlevens won the fourth stage of the Tour. That Tour was full of doping allegations, also towards the TVM team, and as soon as the race had passed the French-Swiss border, Blijlevens left the race, as a protest against the treatments by the French police.

In 1999, Blijlevens wore the pink jersey as leader of the general classification in the Giro d'Italia, after winning the third stage. After the events of 1998, the TVM team was excluded from the 1999 Tour de France. The cyclists of TVM started a legal procedure to force the Tour organisers to invite them, but failed. At the end of that year, Blijlevens left TVM for Team Polti.

In 2000, Blijlevens invested in his climbing-abilities, but this did not work out as planned, and Blijlevens was not as successful as before. He failed to win a stage in the Tour de France, and was even disqualified after finishing the last stage for seeking out and assaulting Bobby Julich. When Polti stopped as a sponsor at the end of the year, Blijlevens signed for Lotto–Adecco for 2001.

In 2001, Blijlevens rode the Giro d'Italia, where the Italian police raided his team's hotel, but no forbidden products were found. As a protest against this treatment, the cyclists refused to start the eighteenth stage.

At the end of 2001, Blijlevens could not find a new team, and made plans to ride as an amateur again, but finally he signed a contract for one year at Domo–Farm Frites. Blijlevens rode for a low base salary, with bonuses for victories. After a year full of injuries, Blijlevens was not given a contract for 2003, and switched to the BankGiroLoterij–Batavus team.

After his retirement at the end of 2004, Blijlevens made plans to break the speed record on a bicycle, but failed to do so.

=== Doping ===
In June 2013 he became sports director of the new Blanco Pro Cycling team, and as part of a Dutch nationwide doping inquiry signed a statement saying he had never used doping. In July he was named in a French Senate report as one of many cyclists who had tested positive for EPO during retesting of samples from the 1998 Tour de France, Blijlevens then confessed that he had used EPO since 1997, and that he had lied in the investigation because he wanted to keep his job.

== Major results ==
1992
1st PWZ Zuidenveld Tour
1993
1st GP de Lillers
1995
1st Draai van de Kaai
1st Profronde van Pijnacker
1st Ronde van Midden-Zeeland
1st Trofeo Alcudia
1st Stage 5 Tour de France
1st Stage 10 Vuelta a España
1996
1st Draai van de Kaai
1st Trofeo Mallorca
1st Profronde van Heerlen
1st Stage 5 Tour de France
1st Stage 5 Vuelta a España
1997
1st Hengelo
1st Veenendaal–Veenendaal
1st Profronde van Wateringen
1st Profronde van Surhuisterveen
1st Stage 6 Tour de France
1998
1st Woerden
1st Stage 4 Tour de France
Vuelta a España

1st Stages 2 & 5

1999
1st Grand Prix de Denain
1st Profronde van Pijnacker
1st Trofeo Mallorca
1st Nokere Koerse
1st Scheldeprijs
1st Profronde van Stiphout
1st Dwars door Gendringen
1st Stage 21 Vuelta a España
Giro d'Italia

1st Stages 3 & 7

2000
1st Mijl van Mares
2003
1st Ruddervoorde
