= Ivan Quaranta =

Italian cyclist

Personal information
- Full name: Ivan Quaranta
- Nickname: The Cheetah (Italian: il Ghepardo)
- Born: 14 December 1974 (age 51) Crema, Italy

Cycling career
- Sport: Cycling
- Current team: MBH Bank CSB Telecom Fort
- Discipline: Road
- Role: Rider (retired); Directeur sportif
- Rider type: Sprinter

Professional teams
- 1996–1997: Team Polti
- 1998: KRKA–Telekom Slovenije
- 1999–2000: Mobilvetta Design–Northwave
- 2001–2002: Alexia Alluminio
- 2003: Saeco
- 2004: Formaggi Pinzolo Fiavè
- 2005: Domina Vacanze
- 2006: CB Immobiliare–Universal Caffè
- 2007–2008: Amore & Vita–McDonald's

Managerial team
- 2017–: Team Colpack

Major wins
- Giro d'Italia, 6 stages

Ivan Quaranta (born 14 December 1974) is an Italian former professional road bicycle racer, who currently works as a directeur sportif for UCI Continental team MBH Bank CSB Telecom Fort. During his career, he won six stages at the Giro d'Italia, between 1999 and 2001.

== Career ==
Born in Crema, Lombardy, Quaranta's most successful year was 1999, when he was riding for the Mobilvetta Design–Northwave team; he already had five wins to his credit leading up to the Giro d'Italia. He then won the first stage in a sprint finish, ahead of Mario Cipollini, significantly boosting his profile.

In 2003, Quaranta was hired by Saeco to replace Cipollini as the team's protected sprinter; he won sprints in lesser races such as the Brixia Tour and the Tour of Qatar. Saeco dropped Quaranta after a single season, subsequent to which he had negligible success. His final win was in the 2007 Settimana Ciclistica Lombarda.

Quaranta retired from professional cycling after the 2008 season.

== Major results ==
1997
3rd Rund um die Nürnberger Altstadt
10th Overall Giro di Puglia
1998
1st Stage 1 Tour de Normandie
1st Stage 4 Olympia's Tour
Tour de Serbie

1st Stages 1 & 7

1999
Giro d'Italia

1st Stages 1 & 11

1st Stage 2 Three Days of De Panne
1st Stage 1 Settimana Ciclistica Lombarda
1st Stage 3 Giro d'Abruzzo
7th Grand Prix Pino Cerami
2000
Giro d'Italia

1st Stages 1 & 10

Tour de Langkawi

1st Stages 7, 8 & 11

1st Stage 3 Settimana Ciclistica Lombarda
2nd Memorial Fabio Casartelli
2001
Giro d'Italia

1st Stages 5 & 16

1st Stage 7 Tour de Langkawi
1st Stage 1 Settimana Internazionale di Coppi e Bartali
1st Stage 3 Tour of the Netherlands
2002
1st Dwars door Gendringen
1st Stage 1 Tour of Qatar
1st Stage 5 Tour of Sweden
1st Stage 2a Regio-Tour
2nd Gran Premio Nobili Rubinetterie
2003
1st Stage 4 Tour of Qatar
1st Stage 3 Settimana Internazionale di Coppi e Bartali
1st Stage 4 Deutschland Tour
1st Stage 1 Brixia Tour
2004
1st Stage 6 Tour de Langkawi
1st Stage 3 Settimana Ciclistica Lombarda
9th Giro della Provincia di Reggio Calabria
2007
1st Stage 4 Settimana Ciclistica Lombarda

=== Grand Tour general classification results timeline ===
Grand Tour	1999	2000	2001	2002	2003	2004	2005
Giro d'Italia	DNF	DNF	129	DNF	—	DNF	DNF
Tour de France	Did not contest during career						
Vuelta a España	—	—	—	DNF	DNF	—	—

Legend
—	Did not compete
DNF	Did not finish
