= 2001 Giro d'Italia =

Race details
- Dates: 19 May – 10 June 2001
- Stages: 21 + prologue
- Distance: 3,356 km (2,085 mi)
- Winning time: 89h 02' 58"

Results
Jersey awarded to the overall winner	Winner	Gilberto Simoni (ITA)	(Lampre–Daikin)
	Second	Abraham Olano (ESP)	(ONCE–Eroski)
	Third	Unai Osa (ESP)	(iBanesto.com)
Jersey awarded to the points classification winner	Points	Massimo Strazzer (ITA)	(Mobilvetta Design–Formaggi Trentini)
Jersey awarded to the mountains classification winner	Mountains	Fredy González (COL)	(Selle Italia–Pacific)
	Combativity	Massimo Strazzer (ITA)	(Mobilvetta Design–Formaggi Trentini)
Jersey awarded to the intergiro classification winner	Intergiro	Massimo Strazzer (ITA)	(Mobilvetta Design–Formaggi Trentini)
	Team	Alessio	
	Team points	Fassa Bortolo	

The 2001 Giro d'Italia was the 84th edition of the Giro. It began with a 7 km (4 mi) prologue that went from Montesilvano to Pescara. The race came to a close on 10 June with a mass-start stage that ended in the Italian city of Milan. Twenty teams entered the race that was won by the Italian Gilberto Simoni of the Lampre–Daikin team. Second and third were the Spanish riders Abraham Olano and Unai Osa.

In the race's other classifications, Selle Italia–Pacific rider Fredy González won the mountains classification, Massimo Strazzer of the Mobilvetta Design–Formaggi Trentini team won the intergiro classification and the points classification. Alessio finished as the winners of the Trofeo Fast Team classification, ranking each of the twenty teams contesting the race by lowest cumulative time. The other team classification, the Trofeo Super Team classification, where the teams' riders are awarded points for placing within the top twenty in each stage and the points are then totaled for each team was also won by Fassa Bortolo.

== Teams ==
A total of 20 teams were invited to participate in the 2001 Giro d'Italia. Each team sent a squad of nine riders, so the Giro began with a peloton of 180 cyclists. Out of the 180 riders that started this edition of the Giro d'Italia, a total of 136 riders made it to the finish in Milan.

The 20 teams that took part in the race were:

- Alessio
- Alexia Alluminio
- Bonjour
- Cantina Tollo
- Ceramiche Panaria–Fiordo
- Fassa Bortolo
- iBanesto.com
- Kelme–Costa Blanca
- Lampre–Daikin
- Liquigas
- Lotto–Adecco
- Mapei–Quick-Step
- Mercatone Uno–Stream TV
- Mobilvetta Design–Formaggi Trentini
- ONCE–Eroski
- Saeco
- Selle Italia–Pacific
- Tacconi Sport–Vini Caldirola
- Team Colpack-Astro
- Team Telekom

== Route and stages ==
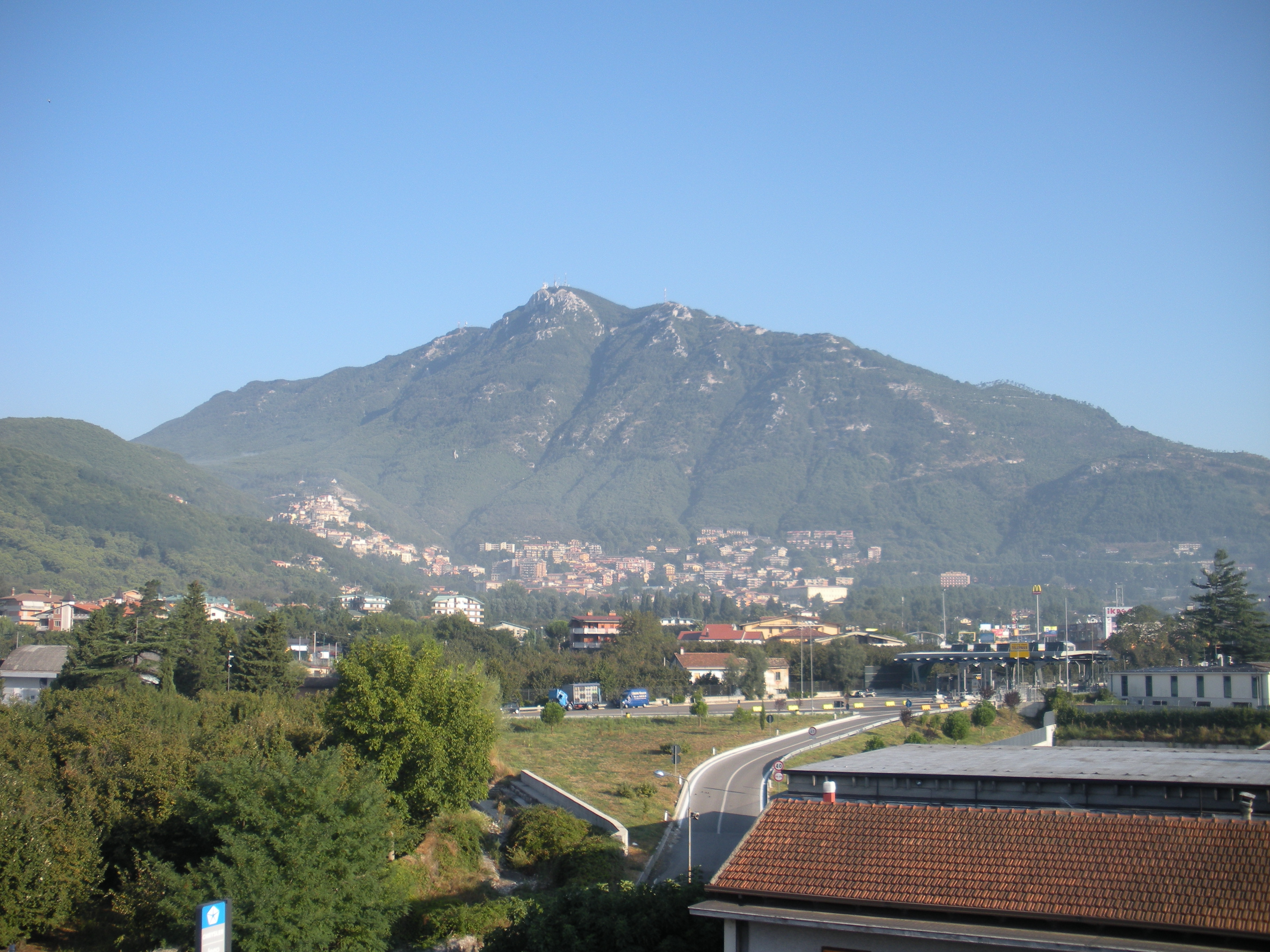
Mercogliano hosted the end of the 169 km (105 mi) fourth stage.

The route for the 2001 Giro d'Italia was unveiled by race director Carmine Castellano and organizers RCS Sport on 11 November 2000 in Milan at the Verdi theatre. It contained two time trial events, both of which were individual. In the stages containing categorized climbs, four had summit finishes: stage 4, to Mercogliano; stage 13, to Passo Pordoi; and stage 18, to Santuario. The organizers chose to include one rest day. When compared to the previous year's race, the race was 320 km (199 mi) shorter, contained the same amount of rest days, and one less individual time trial. In addition, this race had an opening prologue like the year before. It was the longest Grand Tour of the season.

The race will only leave Italy once during its twenty-two racing days as it enters Slovenia where the day finishes in Ljubljana. The lone rest day came after sixteen racing days, on 5 June.

A Cycling News writer felt there were two very tough stages in the race, stages 13 and stage 18. In particular the writer felt the two passes of the Passo Pordoi and the climbs of Passo Rolle and Passo Fedaia made stage 13 particularly difficult. The eighteenth stage contained the Cima Coppi Colle Fauniera which was an 14.5 km (9 mi) climb with an average gradient of 9.5%. The previous year's winner Garzelli described the route to be a "hard Giro, but not the hardest." Pantani said it was an "uncertain Giro" and that the limited time trial distances and fewer climbing kilometers would help Jan Ullrich. Former winner Three-time winner Felice Gimondi agreed with Pantani regarding Ullrich and the route, stating that "it should make certain the presence of Ullrich." Cipollini commented that it's a "Giro with something for everyone."

Stage characteristics and winners
Stage	Date	Course	Distance	Type	Winner
P	19 May	Montesilvano to Pescara	7 km (4 mi)	Individual time trial	Rik Verbrugghe (BEL)
1	20 May	Giulianova to Francavilla al Mare	205 km (127 mi)	Medium mountain stage	Ellis Rastelli (ITA)
2	21 May	Fossacesia to Lucera	163 km (101 mi)	Flat stage	Danilo Hondo (GER)
3	22 May	Lucera to Potenza	149 km (93 mi)	Flat stage	Danilo Hondo (GER)
4	23 May	Potenza to Mercogliano	169 km (105 mi)	Mountain stage	Danilo Di Luca (ITA)
5	24 May	Avellino to Nettuno	229 km (142 mi)	Flat stage	Ivan Quaranta (ITA)
6	25 May	Nettuno to Rieti	152 km (94 mi)	Flat stage	Mario Cipollini (ITA)
7	26 May	Rieti to Montevarchi	239 km (149 mi)	Medium mountain stage	Stefano Zanini (ITA)
8	27 May	Montecatini Terme to Reggio Emilia	185 km (115 mi)	Medium mountain stage	Pietro Caucchioli (ITA)
9	28 May	Reggio Emilia to Rovigo	140 km (87 mi)	Flat stage	Mario Cipollini (ITA)
10	29 May	Lido di Jesolo to Ljubljana (Slovenia)	212 km (132 mi)	Flat stage	Denis Zanette (ITA)
11	30 May	Bled (Slovenia) to Gorizia	187 km (116 mi)	Flat stage	Pablo Lastras (ESP)
12	31 May	Gradisca d'Isonzo to Montebelluna	139 km (86 mi)	Flat stage	Matteo Tosatto (ITA)
13	1 June	Montebelluna to Passo Pordoi	225 km (140 mi)	Medium mountain stage	Julio Alberto Pérez (MEX)
14	2 June	Cavalese to Arco	166 km (103 mi)	Mountain stage	Carlos Alberto Contreras (COL)
15	3 June	Sirmione to Salò	55 km (34 mi)	Individual time trial	Dario Frigo (ITA)
16	4 June	Erbusco to Parma	142 km (88 mi)	Flat stage	Ivan Quaranta (ITA)
	5 June	Rest day			
17	6 June	Sanremo to Sanremo	123 km (76 mi)	Medium mountain stage	Pietro Caucchioli (ITA)
18	7 June	Imperia to Sant'Anna di Vinadio	~~230 km (143 mi)~~	Mountain stage	Stage Cancelled
19	8 June	Alba to Busto Arsizio	163 km (101 mi)	Flat stage	Mario Cipollini (ITA)
20	9 June	Busto Arsizio to Arona	181 km (112 mi)	Mountain stage	Gilberto Simoni (ITA)
21	10 June	Arona to Milan	125 km (78 mi)	Flat stage	Mario Cipollini (ITA)
	Total		3,356 km (2,085 mi)		

== Classification Leadership ==
In the 2001 Giro d'Italia, five different jerseys were awarded. For the general classification, calculated by adding each cyclist's finishing times on each stage, and allowing time bonuses for the first three finishers on mass-start stages, the leader received a pink jersey. This classification is considered the most important of the Giro d'Italia, and the winner is considered the winner of the Giro.

Additionally, there was a points classification, which awarded a mauve jersey. In the points classification, cyclists got points for finishing in the top 15 in a stage. The stage win awarded 25 points, second place awarded 20 points, third 16, fourth 14, fifth 12, sixth 10, and one point fewer per place down the line, to a single point for 15th. In addition, points could be won in intermediate sprints.

There was also a mountains classification, which awarded a green jersey. In the mountains classifications, points were won by reaching the top of a mountain before other cyclists. Each climb was categorized as either first, second, or third category, with more points available for the higher-categorized climbs. The highest point in the Giro (called the Cima Coppi), which in 2001 was the Colle Fauniera, afforded more points than the other first-category climbs.

The fourth jersey represented the intergiro classification, marked by a blue jersey. The calculation for the intergiro is similar to that of the general classification, in each stage there is a midway point that the riders pass through a point and where their time is stopped. As the race goes on, their times compiled and the person with the lowest time is the leader of the intergiro classification and wears the blue jersey.

There were also two classifications for teams. The first was the Trofeo Fast Team. In this classification, the times of the best three cyclists per team on each stage were added; the leading team was the team with the lowest total time. The Trofeo Super Team was a team points classification, with the top 20 placed riders on each stage earning points (20 for first place, 19 for second place and so on, down to a single point for 20th) for their team.

The rows in the following table correspond to the jerseys awarded after that stage was run.

Classification leadership by stage
Stage	Winner	General classification	Points classification	Mountains classification	Intergiro classification	Trofeo Fast Team	Trofeo Super Team
P	Rik Verbrugghe	Rik Verbrugghe	not awarded	not awarded	not awarded	ONCE–Eroski	not awarded
1	Ellis Rastelli	Rik Verbrugghe	Ellis Rastelli	Domenico Gualdi	Unai Osa	Lampre–Daikin	ONCE–Eroski
2	Danilo Hondo	Rik Verbrugghe	Gabriele Colombo	Domenico Gualdi	Pietro Caucchioli	Lampre–Daikin	Cantina Tollo
3	Danilo Hondo	Rik Verbrugghe	Danilo Hondo	Domenico Gualdi	Mariano Piccoli	Lampre–Daikin	Lampre–Daikin
4	Danilo Di Luca	Dario Frigo	Danilo Hondo	Danilo Di Luca	Ivan Quaranta	ONCE–Eroski	Lampre–Daikin
5	Ivan Quaranta	Dario Frigo	Danilo Hondo	Danilo Di Luca	Massimo Strazzer	ONCE–Eroski	Lampre–Daikin
6	Mario Cipollini	Dario Frigo	Danilo Hondo	Danilo Di Luca	Massimo Strazzer	ONCE–Eroski	Lampre–Daikin
7	Stefano Zanini	Dario Frigo	Danilo Hondo	Danilo Di Luca	Massimo Strazzer	ONCE–Eroski	Lampre–Daikin
8	Pietro Caucchioli	Dario Frigo	Danilo Hondo	Fredy González	Massimo Strazzer	ONCE–Eroski	Liquigas
9	Mario Cipollini	Dario Frigo	Danilo Hondo	Fredy González	Massimo Strazzer	ONCE–Eroski	Lampre–Daikin
10	Denis Zanette	Dario Frigo	Danilo Hondo	Fredy González	Massimo Strazzer	ONCE–Eroski	Tacconi Sport–Vini Caldirola
11	Pablo Lastras	Dario Frigo	Danilo Hondo	Fredy González	Massimo Strazzer	iBanesto.com	Tacconi Sport–Vini Caldirola
12	Matteo Tosatto	Dario Frigo	Massimo Strazzer	Fredy González	Massimo Strazzer	iBanesto.com	Tacconi Sport–Vini Caldirola
13	Julio Alberto Pérez	Gilberto Simoni	Massimo Strazzer	Fredy González	Massimo Strazzer	iBanesto.com	Fassa Bortolo
14	Carlos Contreras	Gilberto Simoni	Massimo Strazzer	Fredy González	Massimo Strazzer	Selle Italia–Pacific	Fassa Bortolo
15	Dario Frigo	Gilberto Simoni	Massimo Strazzer	Fredy González	Massimo Strazzer	Alessio	Fassa Bortolo
16	Ivan Quaranta	Gilberto Simoni	Massimo Strazzer	Fredy González	Massimo Strazzer	Alessio	Fassa Bortolo
17	Pietro Caucchioli	Gilberto Simoni	Massimo Strazzer	Fredy González	Massimo Strazzer	Alessio	Fassa Bortolo
18	Stage Cancelled	Gilberto Simoni	Massimo Strazzer	Fredy González	Massimo Strazzer	Alessio	Fassa Bortolo
19	Mario Cipollini	Gilberto Simoni	Massimo Strazzer	Fredy González	Massimo Strazzer	Alessio	Fassa Bortolo
20	Gilberto Simoni	Gilberto Simoni	Massimo Strazzer	Fredy González	Massimo Strazzer	Alessio	Fassa Bortolo
21	Mario Cipollini	Gilberto Simoni	Massimo Strazzer	Fredy González	Massimo Strazzer	Alessio	Fassa Bortolo
Final		Gilberto Simoni	Massimo Strazzer	Fredy González	Massimo Strazzer	Alessio	Alessio

== Final standings ==
Legend
Pink jersey	Denotes the winner of the General classification	Green jersey	Denotes the winner of the Mountains classification
Purple jersey	Denotes the winner of the Points classification	Blue jersey	Denotes the winner of the Intergiro classification

=== General classification ===
	Rider	Team	Time
1	Gilberto Simoni (ITA)	Lampre–Daikin	89h 02' 58"
2	Abraham Olano (ESP)	ONCE–Eroski	+ 7' 31"
3	Unai Osa (ESP)	iBanesto.com	+ 8' 37"
4	Serhiy Honchar (UKR)	Liquigas	+ 9' 25"
5	José Azevedo (POR)	ONCE–Eroski	+ 9' 44"
6	Andrea Noè (ITA)	Mapei–Quick-Step	+ 10' 50"
7	Ivan Gotti (ITA)	Alessio	+ 10' 54"
8	Carlos Alberto Contreras (COL)	Selle Italia–Pacific	+ 11' 44"
9	Pietro Caucchioli (ITA)	Alessio	+ 13' 34"
10	Giuliano Figueras (ITA)	Selle Italia–Pacific	+ 14' 08"

=== Points classification ===
	Rider	Team	Points
1	Massimo Strazzer (ITA)	Mobilvetta Design–Formaggi Trentini	177
2	Danilo Hondo (GER)	Team Telekom	158
3	Mario Cipollini (ITA)	Saeco	136
4	Gilberto Simoni (ITA)	Lampre–Daikin	129
5	Ivan Quaranta (ITA)	Alexia Alluminio	105
6	Marco Zanotti (ITA)	Liquigas	85
7	Andrej Hauptman (SLO)	Tacconi Sport–Vini Caldirola	78
8	Unai Osa (ESP)	iBanesto.com	75
9	Abraham Olano (ESP)	ONCE–Eroski	73
10	Giuliano Figueras (ITA)	Ceramiche Panaria–Fiordo	73

=== Mountains classification ===
	Rider	Team	Points
1	Fredy González (COL)	Selle Italia–Pacific	73
2	Gilberto Simoni (ITA)	Lampre–Daikin	42
3	Fortunato Baliani (ITA)	Selle Italia–Pacific	33
4	Pietro Caucchioli (ITA)	Alessio	32
5	Julio Alberto Pérez (MEX)	Ceramiche Panaria–Fiordo	28
6	Danilo Di Luca (ITA)	Cantina Tollo	21
7	Unai Osa (ESP)	iBanesto.com	16
8	Carlos Alberto Contreras (COL)	Selle Italia–Pacific	14
9	Hernán Buenahora (COL)	Selle Italia–Pacific	14
10	Marzio Bruseghin (ITA)	iBanesto.com	10

=== Intergiro classification ===
	Rider	Team	Time
1	Massimo Strazzer (ITA)	Mobilvetta Design–Formaggi Trentini	51h 27' 14"
2	Stefano Zanini (ITA)	Mapei–Quick-Step	+ 2' 49"
3	Moreno Di Biase (ITA)	Mobilvetta Design–Formaggi Trentini	s.t.
4	Abraham Olano (ESP)	ONCE–Eroski	+ 3' 15"
5	Mariano Piccoli (ITA)	Lampre–Daikin	+ 3' 21"
6	Gilberto Simoni (ITA)	Lampre–Daikin	+ 3' 26"
7	Fortunato Baliani (ITA)	Selle Italia–Pacific	+ 3' 31"
8	Ivan Quaranta (ITA)	Alexia Alluminio	+ 3' 49"
9	Danilo Hondo (GER)	Team Telekom	s.t.
10	Pietro Caucchioli (ITA)	Alessio	+ 3' 51"

=== Trofeo Fast Team classification ===
	Team	Time
1	Alessio	267h 13' 45"
2	iBanesto.com	+ 9' 51"
3	Selle Italia–Pacific	+ 13' 42"
4	ONCE–Eroski	+ 18' 25"
5	Lampre–Daikin	+ 39' 26"
6	Fassa Bortolo	+ 41' 03"
7	Mercatone Uno–Stream TV	+ 46' 03"
8	Liquigas	+ 57' 09"
9	Tacconi Sport–Vini Caldirola	+ 59' 07"
10	Saeco	+ 1h 19' 58"

=== Trofeo Super Team classification ===
	Team	Points
1	Fassa Bortolo	370
2	Tacconi Sport–Vini Caldirola	356
3	Liquigas	322
4	Alessio	313
5	Team Telekom	280
6	Lampre–Daikin	268
7	Mobilvetta Design–Formaggi Trentini	245
8	Ceramiche Panaria–Fiordo	234
9	ONCE–Eroski	233
10	iBanesto.com	231

=== Minor classifications ===
Other less well-known classifications, whose leaders did not receive a special jersey, were awarded during the Giro. Other awards included the Combativity classification, which was a compilation of points gained for position on crossing intermediate sprints, mountain passes and stage finishes. Italian Massimo Strazzer won the Most Combative classification. The Azzurri d'Italia classification was based on finishing order, but points were awarded only to the top three finishers in each stage. Mario Cipollini won the Azzurri d'Italia classification. Paolo Savoldelli won the combination classification.

== Doping cases ==
During the Giro, test for EPO performed on Sergio Barbero in the 2001 Tour of Romandie came back positive. For this reason, Barbero did not start the twelfth stage, pending confirmation of his penalty.

Riccardo Forconi and Pascal Hervé tested positive for EPO, and were not allowed to start stage 17. After stage 17, the Italian police held a doping raid in the cyclists' hotels. Doping was found in Dario Frigo's room, and he was removed from the race, and banned for 6 months. Noan Lelarge tested positive for a banned steroid, and was consequently fired by his team Bonjour.
