= Ivan Gotti =

Italian cyclist

Personal information
- Full name: Ivan Gotti
- Born: 28 March 1969 (age 57) San Pellegrino Terme, Italy
- Height: 1.73 m (5 ft 8 in)
- Weight: 65 kg (143 lb; 10 st 3 lb)

Cycling career
- Sport: Cycling
- Discipline: Road
- Role: Rider
- Rider type: Climber

Professional teams
- 1991–1993: Chateau d'Ax–Gatorade
- 1994: Team Polti–Vaporetto
- 1995–1996: Gewiss–Ballan
- 1997–1998: Saeco–Estro
- 1999–2000: Team Polti
- 2001–2002: Alessio

Major wins
- Grand Tours Giro d'Italia General classification (1997, 1999) 2 individual stages (1996, 1997)

Ivan Gotti (born 28 March 1969) is an Italian former professional road racing cyclist.

Gotti first came to prominence by finishing fifth overall in the 1995 Tour de France. He won his first Giro d'Italia in 1997, taking the race lead from defending champion Pavel Tonkov after winning the mountainous stage to Breuil-Cervinia, and then defending the pink jersey against Tonkov's attacks on the Mortirolo Pass. He won the race again in 1999. After race leader Marco Pantani was removed before stage 21 because his haematocrit exceeded the permitted threshold, Gotti dropped Paolo Savoldelli on the Mortirolo and secured his second overall victory.

== Major results ==
1989
1st Overall Giro della Valle d'Aosta

1st Stages 1 & 4

1st Coppa Città di San Daniele
4th GP Capodarco
10th Overall Giro Ciclistico d'Italia
1990
1st Overall Giro della Valle d'Aosta

1st Stages 2 & 3

1st Giro del Belvedere
2nd Overall Giro Ciclistico d'Italia

1st Stage 8

2nd GP Capodarco
1991
2nd Giro dell'Emilia
2nd Coppa Placci
3rd Gran Premio Città di Camaiore
9th Trofeo Matteotti
1992
3rd Subida a Urkiola
3rd Trofeo dello Scalatore
5th Road race, National Road Championships
6th Overall Vuelta a Burgos
1993
5th Giro dell'Emilia
6th Coppa Sabatini
6th Coppa Placci
9th GP Industria & Artigianato di Larciano
1994
10th Overall Tour de Romandie
10th Milano–Vignola
1995
3rd Coppa Sabatini
5th Overall Tour de France

1st Stage 3 (TTT)
Held after Stages 4 & 5

5th Overall Giro del Trentino
5th Coppa Sabatini
6th Overall Tour de Suisse
6th Coppa Agostoni
9th Coppa Bernocchi
9th Gran Premio Città di Camaiore
1996
5th Overall Giro d'Italia

1st Stage 21

1997
1st Overall Giro d'Italia

1st Stage 14

4th Overall Giro del Trentino
10th Breitling Grand Prix (with Gian Matteo Fagnini)
1998
8th Overall Tour de Romandie
1999
1st Overall Giro d'Italia
1st Gran Premio Nobili Rubinetterie
6th Overall Giro del Trentino
10th À travers Lausanne
2000
5th Tre Valli Varesine
8th Coppa Agostoni
10th Giro dell'Emilia
2001
1st Stage 6 Volta a Catalunya
7th Overall Giro d'Italia
2002
8th Overall Giro Riviera Ligure Ponente

=== Grand Tour general classification results timeline ===
Grand Tour	1992	1993	1994	1995	1996	1997	1998	1999	2000	2001	2002
Giro d'Italia	23	—	16	—	5	1	DNF	1	19	7	13
Tour de France	—	—	—	5	DNF	DNF	—	DNF	—	—	23
Vuelta a España	—	—	—	—	—	—	—	—	DNF	DNF	—

Legend
—	Did not compete
DNF	Did not finish
