= Giuliano Figueras =

Italian cyclist

Personal information
- Full name: Giuliano Figueras
- Born: 24 January 1976 (age 50) Naples, Italy

Cycling career
- Sport: Cycling
- Current team: Retired
- Discipline: Road
- Role: Rider

Amateur team
- 1995–1997: Zalf–Euromobil–Fior

Professional teams
- 1998–2000: Mapei–Bricobi
- 2001–2004: Ceramiche Panaria–Fiordo
- 2005–2007: Lampre–Caffita

Giuliano Figueras (born 24 January 1976 in Naples) is an Italian former professional road bicycle racer. He turned professional in 1998 with Mapei team and won a stage of the Tour de Langkawi that year. In 1999 and 2000 Figueras had 7 wins including a stage of the Giro di Romandia. He rode for the Panaria–Fiordo team for 4 years and had one win each year. In 2005 Figueras switched to the new Lampre–Caffita team. Figueras has in total 14 professional wins.

== Major results ==
1995
2nd Gran Premio di Poggiana
1996
1st Road race, UCI Road World Under-23 Championships
1st Overall Giro delle Regioni

1st Prologue (TTT)

1st Trofeo Zsšdi
1st Coppa Caivano
3rd Trofeo Piva
1997
1st Trofeo Gianfranco Bianchin
1st Stage 2 Girobio
1st Stage 2b Giro della Valle d'Aosta
9th Overall GP Tell

1st Stage 5

9th Gran Premio della Liberazione
1998
2nd Overall Tour de Langkawi

1st Stage 11

7th Giro del Veneto
10th Overall Tour of Galicia
10th Tour de Berne
1999
1st Stage 1 Tour de Romandie
1st GP Rik Van Steenbergen
3rd Clásica de San Sebastián
3rd Trofeo Pantalica
5th Trofeo Laigueglia
5th Coppa Placci
7th Overall Setmana Catalana de Ciclisme

1st Stage 4

7th Paris–Brussels
7th Giro della Provincia di Siracusa
9th Overall Tour de la Region Wallonne

1st Stages 2 & 5

2000
1st Gran Premio di Chiasso
5th Overall Tour Méditerranéen
8th Overall Settimana Internazionale di Coppi e Bartali
2001
1st Giro del Veneto
2nd Giro di Lombardia
4th GP Industria & Artigianato di Larciano
5th Overall Settimana Internazionale di Coppi e Bartali
5th Giro dell'Appennino
5th Trofeo Matteotti
6th Giro di Campania
7th Road race, UCI Road World Championships
7th Trofeo Pantalica
10th Overall Giro d'Italia
10th Overall Giro del Trentino
2002
1st Giro dell'Appennino
2nd GP Industria & Artigianato di Larciano
3rd Trofeo Pantalica
7th Overall Giro della Liguria
7th Trofeo Laigueglia
2003
1st Gran Premio di Chiasso
3rd Trofeo Pantalica
2004
1st Overall Settimana Internazionale di Coppi e Bartali
2nd Giro dell'Appennino
4th Overall Giro del Trentino
7th Overall Tour Down Under
8th Overall Tirreno–Adriatico
8th Giro di Toscana
2005
2nd Trofeo Città di Castelfidardo
2nd Gran Premio di Chiasso
10th Tour du Haut Var
2006
1st Giro del Lazio
1st Stage 3 Brixia Tour
2nd Giro di Toscana
4th Tre Valli Varesine
5th GP Fred Mengoni
7th Memorial Marco Pantani
8th Vattenfall Cyclassics
8th Trofeo Laigueglia
9th Overall Vuelta a Murcia

=== Grand Tour general classification results timeline ===
Grand Tour	1998	1999	2000	2001	2002	2003	2004	2005
Giro d'Italia	—	36	DNF	10	—	27	DNF	—
Tour de France	—	—	—	—	—	—	—	—
Vuelta a España	56	—	—	29	—	—	—	DNF

Legend
—	Did not compete
DNF	Did not finish
