= Vladimir Duma =

Ukrainian cyclist

Personal information
- Born: 2 March 1972 (age 54) Khust, Ukrainian SSR, Soviet Union

Cycling career
- Sport: Cycling
- Discipline: Road
- Role: Rider

Professional teams
- 1998–2002: Scrigno–Gaerne
- 2003–2004: Landbouwkrediet–Colnago
- 2005–2006: Universal Caffè-Styloffice
- 2007–2009: Ceramica Flaminia
- 2010: Romet Weltour Dębica

Vladimir Duma (Ukrainian: Володимир Дума, born 2 March 1972 in Khust) is a former Ukrainian racing cyclist. He rode in 6 Grand Tours.

== Palmares ==
1993
1st Stage 7 Peace Race
1996
1st Stage 2 Giro d'Abruzzo
1997
1st Coppa Colli Briantei Internazionale
1st Gran Premio Città di Felino
3rd Piccolo Giro di Lombardia
1998
National Road Race Champion
1st Stage 6 Tour de Suisse
1999
1st Stage 5 Giro d'Abruzzo
2000
2nd Giro d'Abruzzo

1st Stage 2

2001
3rd Gran Premio della Costa Etruschi
2002
1st Gran Premio Industria e Commercio di Prato
2003
1st Stage 4 Regio-Tour
2004
2nd National Road Race Championships
3rd Tre Valli Varesine
2006
1st Tour of Japan

1st Stage 2

3rd Giro di Toscana
2007
3rd Circuit de la Sarthe
2010
1st Bałtyk–Karkonosze Tour
3rd Pomerania Tour
