= Matteo Tosatto =

Italian cyclist (born 1974)

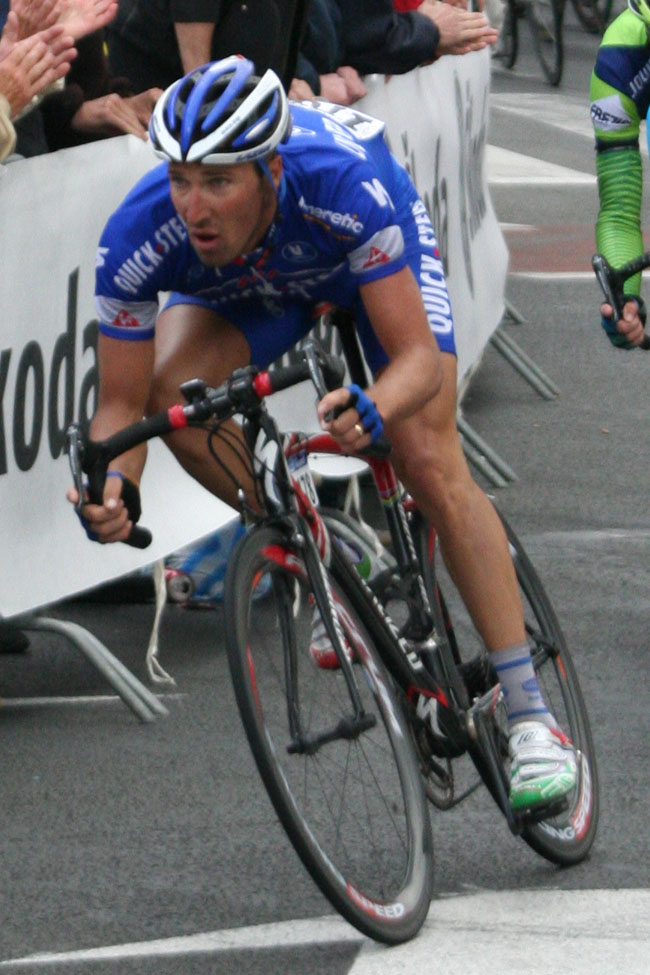

Personal information
- Full name: Matteo Tosatto
- Born: 14 May 1974 (age 52) Castelfranco Veneto, Italy
- Height: 1.81 m (5 ft 11 1/2 in)
- Weight: 74 kg (163 lb; 11 st 9 lb)

Cycling career
- Sport: Cycling
- Current team: Tudor Pro Cycling Team
- Discipline: Road
- Role: Rider (retired); Directeur sportif
- Rider type: Classics specialist

Professional teams
- 1997: MG Maglificio–Technogym
- 1998–1999: Ballan
- 2000–2005: Fassa Bortolo
- 2006–2010: Quick-Step–Innergetic
- 2011–2016: Saxo Bank–SunGard

Managerial teams
- 2017–2023: Team Sky
- 2024–: Tudor Pro Cycling Team

Major wins
- Grand Tours Tour de France 1 individual stage (2006) Giro d'Italia 1 individual stage (2001)

Matteo Tosatto (born 14 May 1974) is an Italian former road racing cyclist. He rode as a professional between 1997 and 2016, with his biggest personal victories coming in stages of the Giro d'Italia and the Tour de France. He contested 34 Grand Tours during his career, making him the rider with most participations and finishing 28 of them.

Following his retirement, Tosatto became a directeur sportif with Team Sky, beginning midway through the 2017 cycling season. He left the team following the 2023 season, and joined UCI ProTeam Tudor Pro Cycling Team in the same role for the 2024 season – ahead of their Grand Tour début at the 2024 Giro d'Italia.

== Major results ==
1996
1st Stage 9 Girobio
1997
7th Rund um Köln
1998
1st Giro del Medio Brenta
3rd Overall Tour of Austria
5th Veenendaal–Veenendaal
5th GP Rik Van Steenbergen
1999
4th Grand Prix Pino Cerami
7th Brabantse Pijl
9th Clásica de Almería
2000
1st Stage 4 Paris–Nice
2nd Rund um den Henninger Turm
3rd Giro della Romagna
6th Gran Premio della Costa Etruschi
2001
1st Stage 12 Giro d'Italia
2002
1st Coppa Placci
3rd Trofeo Matteotti
3rd Coppa Bernocchi
4th Criterium d'Abruzzo
5th Gran Premio Bruno Beghelli
6th Trofeo Melinda
10th Giro della Romagna
2003
5th Giro del Piemonte
2004
1st Giro di Toscana
1st GP Kanton Aargau Gippingen
1st Stage 1b (TTT) Settimana Internazionale di Coppi e Bartali
2nd Giro del Veneto
2nd Giro della Romagna
3rd Overall Giro della Provincia di Lucca
4th Coppa Bernocchi
7th Gran Premio della Costa Etruschi
2006
1st Stage 18 Tour de France
7th Gran Premio Città di Camaiore
2007
1st Stage 1 (TTT) Tour of Qatar
2008
1st Stage 1 (TTT) Tour of Qatar
4th Giro del Lazio
2009
9th Memorial Cimurri
2011
8th Giro del Friuli
2012
7th Paris–Roubaix

=== Grand Tour general classification results timeline ===
Grand Tour	1997	1998	1999	2000	2001	2002	2003	2004	2005	2006	2007	2008	2009	2010	2011	2012	2013	2014	2015	2016
Giro d'Italia	—	—	43	DNF	50	63	DNF	107	122	—	94	—	—	56	136	104	—	—	112	107
Tour de France	132	—	—	—	60	—	—	110	—	125	108	96	114	—	123	—	92	119	132	145
Vuelta a España	—	—	—	—	—	—	134	—	DNF	DNF	—	DNF	DNF	67	—	135	115	120	—	—

Legend
—	Did not compete
DNF	Did not finish
