= Andrea Noè =

Italian cyclist

Personal information
- Full name: Andrea Noè
- Born: 15 January 1969 (age 57) Magenta, Italy
- Height: 1.78 m (5 ft 10 in)
- Weight: 65 kg (143 lb)

Cycling career
- Sport: Cycling
- Discipline: Road
- Role: Rider
- Rider type: Climber

Amateur team
- 1991–1992: Mecair–Rossin

Professional teams
- 1993: Eldor
- 1994–1996: Mapei–CLAS
- 1997–1998: Asics–CGA
- 1999–2002: Mapei–Quick-Step
- 2003–2004: Alessio
- 2005–2009: Liquigas–Bianchi
- 2010: Ceramica Flaminia
- 2011: Farnese Vini–Neri Sottoli

Major wins
- Grand Tours Giro d'Italia 1 individual stage (1998) 1 TTT stage (2007)

Andrea Noè (born 15 January 1969) is an Italian former professional road bicycle racer, who competed as a professional between 1993 and 2011, always racing with Italian teams. One of his greatest achievements was winning stage 11 in the 1998 Giro d'Italia.

In the 2007 Giro d'Italia, Noè, aged 38 at the time, took the leaders pink jersey on the extremely long stage 10 after outclimbing his breakaway companions of two days earlier. He finished 1:08 ahead of the second placed rider Marzio Bruseghin and 2:58 of his Liquigas team captain and 2005 UCI ProTour Champion, Danilo Di Luca. He held onto the jersey for a second day before relinquishing it to Di Luca.

== Major results ==
1992
3rd Overall Girobio
3rd Giro d'Oro
1994
4th Overall Vuelta a Murcia
4th Overall Tour Méditerranéen
1995
7th Overall Tour Méditerranéen
9th Giro di Toscana
10th Gran Premio Industria e Commercio di Prato
1996
3rd Overall Tour de Pologne
5th Giro dell'Appennino
8th Overall Setmana Catalana de Ciclisme
9th Overall Tour de Romandie
9th Overall Critérium International
1997
5th Overall Escalada a Montjuïc
7th La Flèche Wallonne
7th Milano–Torino
8th Overall Critérium International
9th Trofeo dello Scalatore
10th Milan–San Remo
1998
Giro d'Italia

1st Stage 11
Held after Stage 13

9th Overall Setmana Catalana de Ciclisme
1999
5th Milano–Torino
6th Overall Tour de Romandie
8th Paris–Bourges
2000
4th Overall Giro d'Italia
4th Overall Tour de Romandie

1st Stage 4

4th Giro dell'Appennino
5th Overall Giro del Trentino
8th Coppa Bernocchi
9th Overall Tour of Sweden
2001
6th Overall Giro d'Italia
8th Overall Settimana Internazionale Coppi e Bartali
8th Giro dell'Appennino
9th Overall Giro del Trentino
2002
4th La Flèche Wallonne
6th Overall Tour de Romandie
8th Overall Tour of the Basque Country
8th Tour du Haut Var
2003
2nd Overall Tour de Pologne
4th Overall Giro d'Italia
5th Clásica de San Sebastián
6th Giro dell'Emilia
8th Overall Vuelta a Andalucía
10th Overall Tirreno–Adriatico
2004
5th Overall Settimana Internazionale Coppi e Bartali
7th Overall Route du Sud
9th Giro del Lazio
10th Giro del Veneto
2005
5th GP Industria Artigianato e Commercio Carnaghese
7th Milano–Torino
8th Giro dell'Appennino
10th Gran Premio di Chiasso
2007
Giro d'Italia

1st Stage 1 (TTT)
Held after Stages 10 & 11

3rd Overall Tour de Slovénie
7th Overall Giro del Trentino
9th Tre Valli Varesine
10th GP Lugano
2008
7th Tre Valli Varesine
8th Overall Deutschland Tour
8th Tre Valli Varesine
10th Overall Settimana Internazionale Coppi e Bartali
2010
4th Overall Tour de Slovénie
7th GP Lugano

=== Grand Tour general classification results timeline ===
Grand Tour	1993	1994	1995	1996	1997	1998	1999	2000	2001	2002	2003	2004	2005	2006	2007	2008	2009	2010	2011
Giro d'Italia	—	DNF	36	37	11	15	28	4	6	20	4	17	45	38	35	39	—	—	DNF
Tour de France	—	—	—	—	—	—	—	—	—	—	74	99	—	—	—	—	—	—	—
// Vuelta a España	68	—	—	—	52	—	41	—	DNF	DNF	—	—	—	—	—	—	—	—	—

Legend
—	Did not compete
DNF	Did not finish
