= Mariano Piccoli =

Italian cyclist

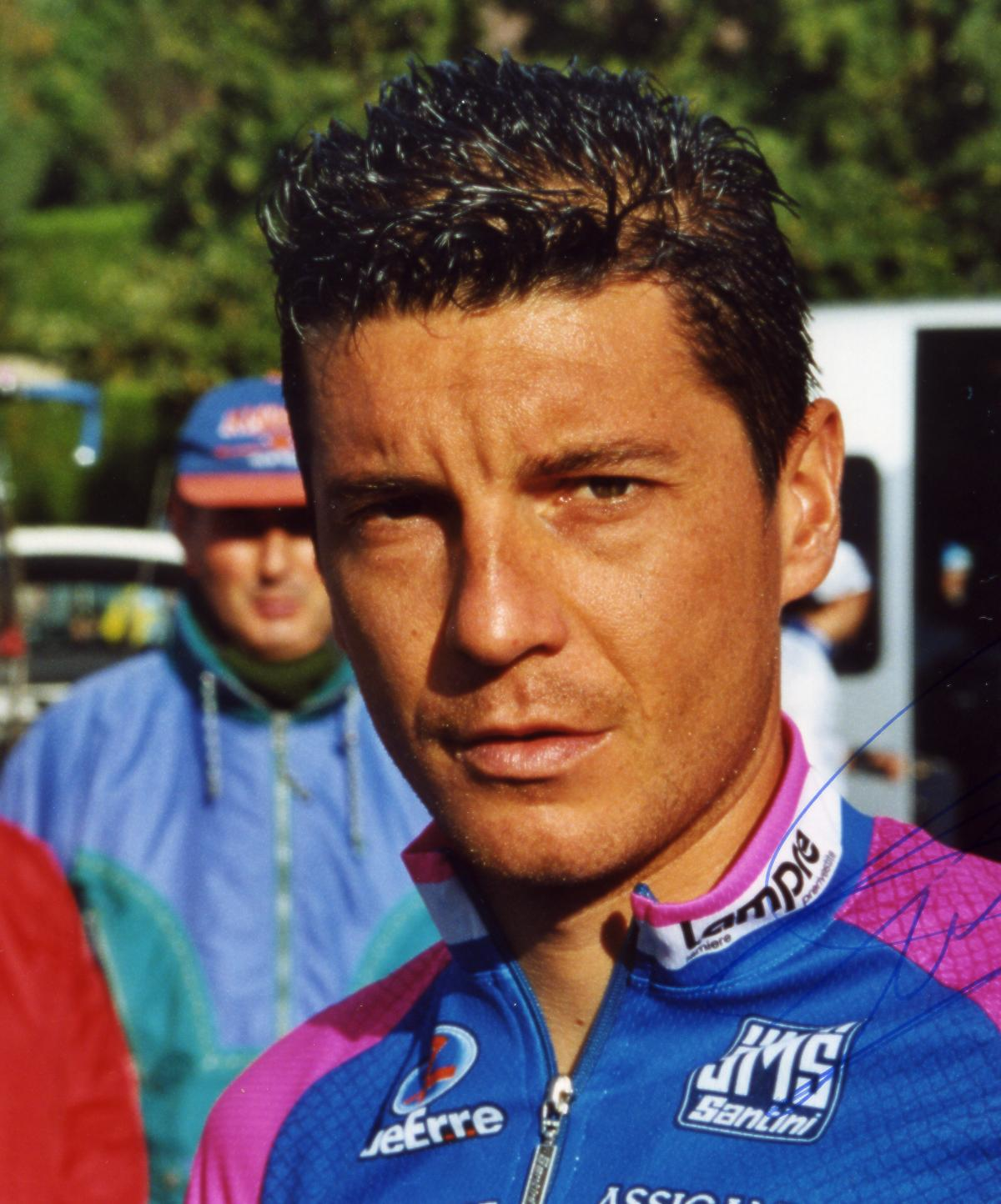

Personal information
- Full name: Mariano Piccoli
- Nickname: El Pistolero (The Gunman)
- Born: 11 September 1970 (age 56) Trento, Italy

Cycling career
- Sport: Cycling
- Discipline: Road
- Role: Rider

Professional teams
- 1992–1994: Mercatone Uno–Medeghini–Zucchini
- 1995–1998: Brescialat–Fago
- 1999–2004: Lampre–Daikin

Major wins
- Grand Tours Giro d'Italia Points classification (1998) Mountains classification (1995, 1996) 3 individual stages (1995, 1996, 2000) Vuelta a España 3 individual stages (1997, 2000)

Mariano Piccoli (born 11 September 1970) is an Italian former road bicycle racer. Professional between 1992 and 2005, his major victories were 3 individual stages in both Giro d'Italia and Vuelta a España. He also won Points Classification once and Mountains Classification twice in Giro.

== Major results ==
1991
1st Gran Premio Palio del Recioto
1995
Giro d'Italia

1st Mountains classification
1st Stage 15

Tour of Poland

1st Stage 7 & 9

1st Stage 4a Euskal Bizikleta
2nd Overall Giro del Trentino
7th Tre Valli Varesine
9th GP Industria & Artigianato di Larciano
1996
1st Mountains classification Giro d'Italia
1997
1st Gran Premio Industria e Commercio di Prato
1st Stage 10 Vuelta a España
1998
Giro d'Italia

1st Points classification
1st Stage 1

2nd Overall Rheinland-Pfalz Rundfahrt

1st Stage 1

4th Giro della Provincia di Siracusa
1999
10th Giro dell'Appennino
2000
Vuelta a España

1st Stages 12 & 18

1st Stage 21 Giro d'Italia
8th Grand Prix of Aargau Canton
2001
1st Points classification Tour de Romandie
8th Giro della Provincia di Siracusa
2003
1st Stage 1b (TTT) Settimana Internazionale di Coppi e Bartali
