= Mobilvetta Design =

Team information
- UCI code: MDN (1998–2002), FPF (2003–2004)
- Founded: 1998
- Disbanded: 2004
- Discipline: Road
- Status: Retired

Team name history
- 1996-1997 1998-1999 2000 2001-2002 2003-2004: Ceramich Refin - Mobilitetta; Mobilvetta Design - Northwave; Mobilvetta Design - Rossin; Mobilvetta Design - Formaggi Trentini; Formaggi Pinzolo Fiavé

Mobilvetta Design was a cycling team from 1996 to 2004, based in Italy.

== History ==
At the end of the 1997 season, Refin–Mobilvetta disbanded when the main sponsor, Refin, withdrew. The subsponsor, Mobilvetta, then created a new team with new cyclists, new team leaders, and new bicycles. Rossin Bikes was a 2000 co-sponsor and supplier of bicycles in 1999 and 2000.

The team competed in the 1999, 2000, 2001, 2002, 2003, and 2004 Giro d'Italia.
