= Paolo Savoldelli =

Italian cyclist

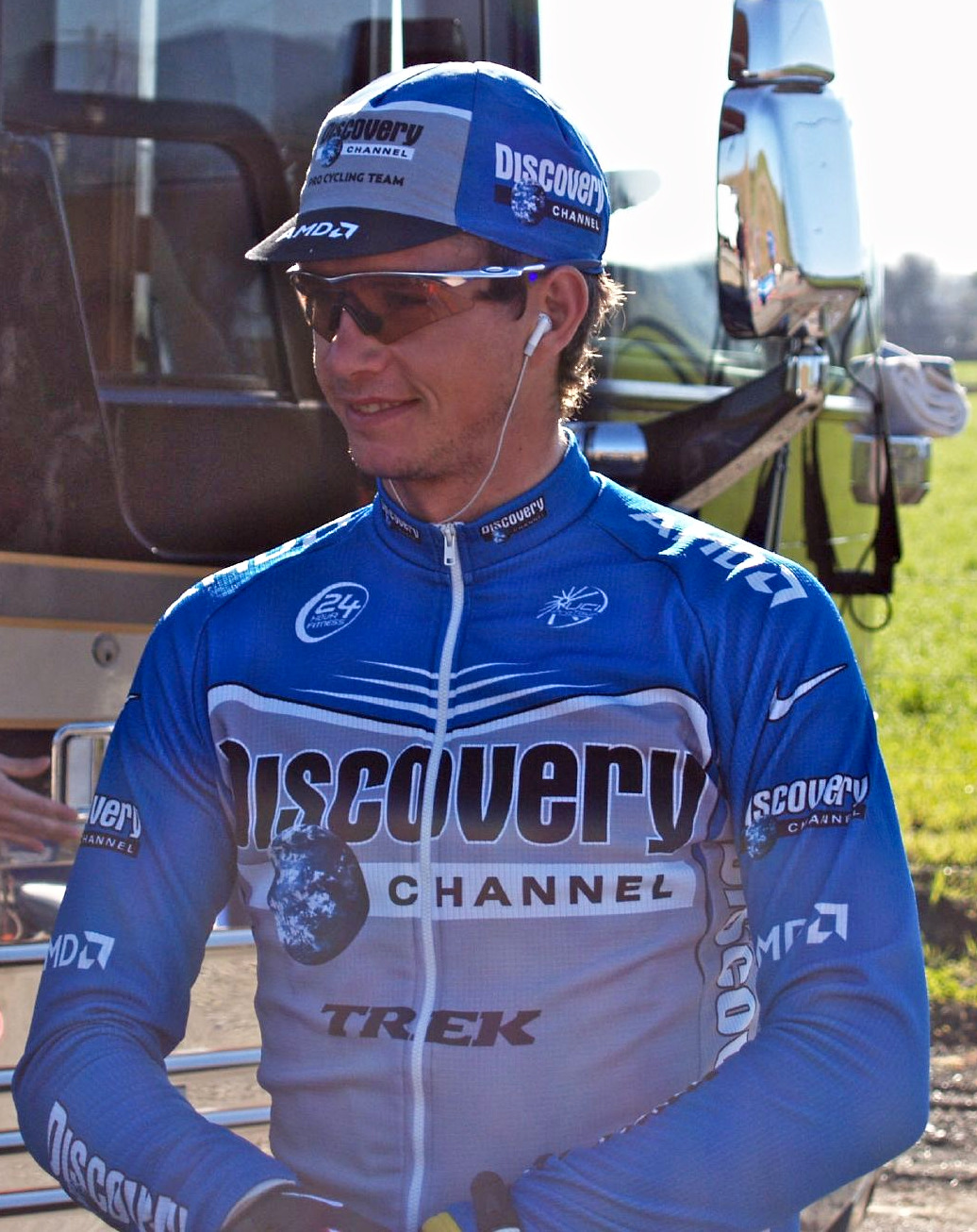
- Savoldelli at 2006 Tour of California

Personal information
- Full name: Paolo Savoldelli
- Nickname: Il Falco ("The Falcon")
- Born: 7 May 1973 (age 53) Clusone, Italy
- Height: 1.80 m (5 ft 11 in)
- Weight: 70 kg (154 lb; 11 st 0 lb)

Cycling career
- Sport: Cycling
- Discipline: Road
- Role: Rider
- Rider type: All-rounder

Professional teams
- 1996–1997: Roslotto–ZG Mobili
- 1998–2001: Saeco
- 2002: Index-Alexia Alluminio
- 2003–2004: Team Telekom
- 2005–2006: Discovery Channel
- 2007: Astana
- 2008: LPR Brakes–Ballan

Major wins
- Grand Tours Tour de France 1 individual stage (2005) Giro d'Italia General classification (2002, 2005) Combination classification (2006) 4 individual stages (1999, 2005, 2006, 2007) Stage races Tour de Romandie (2000) Giro del Trentino (1998, 1999)

Paolo Savoldelli (born 7 May 1973) is an Italian former road racing cyclist, winner of the 2002 and 2005 Giro d'Italia.

Savoldelli was a climber but known for his fast downhill riding. He is nicknamed Il Falco ("the falcon"). His downhill skills won him the 2005 Giro. His descent of the Colle delle Finestre before the final ascent to Sestriere in the penultimate stage, closed a gap to Gilberto Simoni, preserving his lead and giving him the win.

On 20 July 2005, Savoldelli won the 17th stage of the Tour de France. He led Astana in the 2007 Giro d'Italia, but worked for teammate Eddy Mazzoleni.

Savoldelli retired from competitive professional cycling at the end of the 2008 season. He did not leave the cycling world however, as he embarked on a career covering the sport in the media.

As of 2012, Savoldelli worked for the Italian television channel RAI, providing viewers with commentary on cycling races. He comments from a motorbike, offering insights from a first-hand point of view. He concludes each of his interventions with an emphatic "A Voi!" (Italian for "Back to you!"), which became his trademark.

Despite having already retired, in May 2014 Savoldelli was banned from bicycle racing for six months for being a client of the infamous doping doctor, Michele Ferrari. Later his name was tied to evidence in the 2012 USADA Report as "Rider 1," and he is said to have set up and used EPO doping in the 2006 Giro d'Italia.

== Career achievements ==
=== Major results ===
1996
10th Overall Volta a Catalunya
1997
1st Stage 4 Hofbrau Cup
1998
1st Overall Giro del Trentino

1st Stage 2

9th Overall Giro d'Italia
10th Overall Tour de Romandie
1999
1st Overall Giro del Trentino

1st Stage 1

1st Trofeo Laigueglia
2nd Overall Giro d'Italia

1st Stage 14

4th Overall Tour de Romandie
2000
1st Overall Tour de Romandie

1st Prologue

3rd Overall Giro del Trentino

1st Stage 3

2001
Tour de Romandie

1st Prologue & Stage 2

4th Overall Tirreno–Adriatico
2002
1st Overall Giro d'Italia
7th Overall Tirreno–Adriatico
2004
6th Overall Tour of Britain
9th Tre Valli Varesine
2005
1st Overall Giro d'Italia

1st Stage 11

1st Stage 17 Tour de France
9th Klasika Primavera
2006
1st Prologue Tour de Romandie
4th Overall Tirreno–Adriatico
5th Overall Giro d'Italia

1st Combination classification
1st Prologue

2007
1st Stage 20 Giro d'Italia
2nd Overall Tour de Romandie

1st Prologue

2008
2nd Overall Settimana Ciclistica Lombarda

=== Grand Tour general classification results timeline ===
Grand Tour	1996	1997	1998	1999	2000	2001	2002	2003	2004	2005	2006	2007	2008
Giro d'Italia	—	13	9	2	24	14	1	—	—	1	5	12	15
Tour de France	33	—	—	DNF	41	—	—	—	—	25	DNF	—	—
/ Vuelta a España	—	—	DNF	—	—	DNF	DNF	—	—	—	—	—	—

Legend
—	Did not compete
DNF	Did not finish

DNF = Did not finish
