= List of teams and cyclists in the 2002 Tour de France =

List of cyclists

For the 2002 Tour de France, the selection was done as follows: U.S. Postal Service was selected because it included the winner (prior to disqualification) of the previous edition, Lance Armstrong. Rabobank was selected because it included the winner of the 2001 UCI Road World Cup (Erik Dekker). Alessio, Kelme–Costa Blanca and iBanesto.com were selected because they won the team classifications in respectively the 2001 Giro d'Italia, 2001 Tour de France and 2001 Vuelta a España. This was extended to 16 teams based on the UCI ranking in the highest UCI division at the end of 2001, after compensating for transfers. The teams selected in this way were: Five more teams were given wildcards by the organisation. After the wildcards were given, it was announced that Saeco's main rider Gilberto Simoni had tested positive for cocaine on two occasions. In response, the wildcard for Saeco was withdrawn and given to Jean Delatour.

In total, 21 teams participated, each with 9 cyclists, for a total of 189 cyclists.

== Teams ==
Qualified teams

- U.S. Postal Service
- Rabobank
- Alessio
- Kelme–Costa Blanca
- iBanesto.com
- Fassa Bortolo
- Team Telekom
- Mapei–Quick-Step
- Lotto–Adecco
- Cofidis
- ONCE–Eroski
- Domo–Farm Frites
- Lampre–Daikin
- CSC–Tiscali
- Euskaltel–Euskadi
- Tacconi Sport

Invited teams

- Crédit Agricole
- Bonjour
- AG2R Prévoyance
- Française des Jeux
- Saeco–Longoni Sport

== Cyclists ==
=== By starting number ===
Legend
No.	Starting number worn by the rider during the Tour
Pos.	Position in the general classification
DNF	Denotes a rider who did not finish

No.	Name	Nationality	Team	Pos.	Ref
~~1~~	~~Lance Armstrong~~	~~United States~~	~~U.S. Postal Service~~	~~1~~	
2	Viatcheslav Ekimov	Russia	U.S. Postal Service	58	
3	Roberto Heras	Spain	U.S. Postal Service	9	
4	George Hincapie	United States	U.S. Postal Service	59	
5	Benoît Joachim	Luxembourg	U.S. Postal Service	89	
6	Floyd Landis	United States	U.S. Postal Service	61	
7	Pavel Padrnos	Czech Republic	U.S. Postal Service	69	
8	Víctor Hugo Peña	Colombia	U.S. Postal Service	73	
9	José Luis Rubiera	Spain	U.S. Postal Service	22	
11	Erik Zabel	Germany	Team Telekom	82	
12	Rolf Aldag	Germany	Team Telekom	72	
13	Udo Bölts	Germany	Team Telekom	48	
14	Gian Matteo Fagnini	Italy	Team Telekom	101	
15	Giuseppe Guerini	Italy	Team Telekom	80	
16	Danilo Hondo	Germany	Team Telekom	104	
17	Bobby Julich	United States	Team Telekom	37	
18	Kevin Livingston	United States	Team Telekom	56	
19	Steffen Wesemann	Germany	Team Telekom	99	
21	Joseba Beloki	Spain	ONCE–Eroski	2	
22	José Azevedo	Portugal	ONCE–Eroski	6	
23	Álvaro González de Galdeano	Spain	ONCE–Eroski	DNF	
24	Igor González de Galdeano	Spain	ONCE–Eroski	5	
25	Jörg Jaksche	Germany	ONCE–Eroski	31	
26	Isidro Nozal	Spain	ONCE–Eroski	38	
27	Abraham Olano	Spain	ONCE–Eroski	78	
28	Mikel Pradera	Spain	ONCE–Eroski	76	
29	Marcos-Antonio Serrano	Spain	ONCE–Eroski	33	
31	Óscar Sevilla	Spain	Kelme–Costa Blanca	DNF	
32	Santiago Botero	Colombia	Kelme–Costa Blanca	4	
33	Francisco Cabello	Spain	Kelme–Costa Blanca	111	
34	José Javier Gomez	Spain	Kelme–Costa Blanca	DNF	
35	José Enrique Gutiérrez	Spain	Kelme–Costa Blanca	29	
36	Santiago Pérez	Spain	Kelme–Costa Blanca	DNF	
37	Antonio Tauler	Spain	Kelme–Costa Blanca	DNF	
38	José Ángel Vidal	Spain	Kelme–Costa Blanca	134	
39	Constantino Zaballa	Spain	Kelme–Costa Blanca	116	
41	Andrey Kivilev	Kazakhstan	Cofidis	21	
42	Daniel Atienza	Spain	Cofidis	DNF	
43	Íñigo Cuesta	Spain	Cofidis	49	
44	Bingen Fernández	Spain	Cofidis	79	
45	Massimiliano Lelli	Italy	Cofidis	14	
46	Nico Mattan	Belgium	Cofidis	123	
47	David Millar	Great Britain	Cofidis	68	
48	David Moncoutié	France	Cofidis	13	
49	Cédric Vasseur	France	Cofidis	55	
51	Laurent Jalabert	France	CSC–Tiscali	42	
52	Tyler Hamilton	United States	CSC–Tiscali	15	
53	Andrea Peron	Italy	CSC–Tiscali	53	
54	Jakob Piil	Denmark	CSC–Tiscali	125	
55	Arvis Piziks	Latvia	CSC–Tiscali	152	
56	Michael Sandstød	Denmark	CSC–Tiscali	DNF	
57	Carlos Sastre	Spain	CSC–Tiscali	10	
58	Nicki Sørensen	Denmark	CSC–Tiscali	20	
59	Paul Van Hyfte	Belgium	CSC–Tiscali	120	
61	Christophe Moreau	France	Crédit Agricole	DNF	
62	Frédéric Bessy	France	Crédit Agricole	67	
63	Sébastien Hinault	France	Crédit Agricole	147	
64	Thor Hushovd	Norway	Crédit Agricole	112	
65	Anthony Langella	France	Crédit Agricole	148	
66	Anthony Morin	France	Crédit Agricole	90	
67	Stuart O'Grady	Australia	Crédit Agricole	77	
68	Jonathan Vaughters	United States	Crédit Agricole	DNF	
69	Jens Voigt	Germany	Crédit Agricole	110	
71	Richard Virenque	France	Domo–Farm Frites	16	
72	Dave Bruylandts	Belgium	Domo–Farm Frites	DNF	
73	Enrico Cassani	Italy	Domo–Farm Frites	124	
74	Servais Knaven	Netherlands	Domo–Farm Frites	137	
75	Tomáš Konečný	Czech Republic	Domo–Farm Frites	65	
76	Axel Merckx	Belgium	Domo–Farm Frites	28	
77	Fred Rodriguez	United States	Domo–Farm Frites	DNF	
78	Léon van Bon	Netherlands	Domo–Farm Frites	129	
79	Piotr Wadecki	Poland	Domo–Farm Frites	43	
81	Ivan Basso	Italy	Fassa Bortolo	11	
82	Fabio Baldato	Italy	Fassa Bortolo	132	
83	Wladimir Belli	Italy	Fassa Bortolo	45	
84	Volodymir Hustov	Ukraine	Fassa Bortolo	40	
85	Serhiy Honchar	Ukraine	Fassa Bortolo	64	
86	Sergei Ivanov	Russia	Fassa Bortolo	81	
87	Nicola Loda	Italy	Fassa Bortolo	121	
88	Oscar Pozzi	Italy	Fassa Bortolo	DNF	
89	Marco Velo	Italy	Fassa Bortolo	54	
91	Nicolas Vogondy	France	Française des Jeux	19	
92	Sandy Casar	France	Française des Jeux	83	
93	Jimmy Casper	France	Française des Jeux	DNF	
94	Baden Cooke	Australia	Française des Jeux	127	
95	Jacky Durand	France	Française des Jeux	DNF	
96	Frédéric Guesdon	France	Française des Jeux	DNF	
97	Bradley McGee	Australia	Française des Jeux	109	
98	Christophe Mengin	France	Française des Jeux	86	
99	Jean-Cyril Robin	France	Française des Jeux	32	
101	Levi Leipheimer	United States	Rabobank	8	
102	Michael Boogerd	Netherlands	Rabobank	12	
103	Bram de Groot	Netherlands	Rabobank	133	
104	Erik Dekker	Netherlands	Rabobank	136	
105	Addy Engels	Netherlands	Rabobank	94	
106	Karsten Kroon	Netherlands	Rabobank	146	
107	Grischa Niermann	Germany	Rabobank	51	
108	Marc Wauters	Belgium	Rabobank	91	
109	Beat Zberg	Switzerland	Rabobank	27	
111	Didier Rous	France	Bonjour	DNF	
112	Walter Bénéteau	France	Bonjour	117	
113	Franck Bouyer	France	Bonjour	114	
114	Sylvain Chavanel	France	Bonjour	36	
115	Emmanuel Magnien	France	Bonjour	96	
116	Damien Nazon	France	Bonjour	151	
117	Jérôme Pineau	France	Bonjour	87	
118	Franck Rénier	France	Bonjour	85	
119	François Simon	France	Bonjour	DNF	
121	Óscar Freire	Spain	Mapei–Quick-Step	DNF	
122	László Bodrogi	Hungary	Mapei–Quick-Step	62	
123	Fabien De Waele	Belgium	Mapei–Quick-Step	DNF	
124	Pedro Horrillo	Spain	Mapei–Quick-Step	107	
125	Robert Hunter	South Africa	Mapei–Quick-Step	97	
126	Miguel Martinez	France	Mapei–Quick-Step	44	
127	Tom Steels	Belgium	Mapei–Quick-Step	DNF	
128	Andrea Tafi	Italy	Mapei–Quick-Step	106	
129	Gerhard Trampusch	Austria	Mapei–Quick-Step	63	
131	Denis Menchov	Russia	iBanesto.com	93	
132	Dariusz Baranowski	Poland	iBanesto.com	24	
133	Santiago Blanco	Spain	iBanesto.com	57	
134	Marzio Bruseghin	Italy	iBanesto.com	47	
135	José Vicente García	Spain	iBanesto.com	122	
136	David Latasa	Spain	iBanesto.com	84	
137	Francisco Mancebo	Spain	iBanesto.com	7	
138	Unai Osa	Spain	iBanesto.com	18	
139	Javier Pascual Rodríguez	Spain	iBanesto.com	95	
141	Rik Verbrugghe	Belgium	Lotto–Adecco	DNF	
142	Mario Aerts	Belgium	Lotto–Adecco	50	
143	Serge Baguet	Belgium	Lotto–Adecco	105	
144	Christophe Brandt	Belgium	Lotto–Adecco	35	
145	Hans De Clercq	Belgium	Lotto–Adecco	145	
146	Thierry Marichal	Belgium	Lotto–Adecco	126	
147	Robbie McEwen	Australia	Lotto–Adecco	130	
148	Gennady Mikhaylov	Russia	Lotto–Adecco	92	
149	Aart Vierhouten	Netherlands	Lotto–Adecco	DNF	
151	Marco Serpellini	Italy	Lampre–Daikin	74	
152	Raivis Belohvoščiks	Latvia	Lampre–Daikin	118	
153	Rubens Bertogliati	Switzerland	Lampre–Daikin	138	
154	Alessandro Cortinovis	Italy	Lampre–Daikin	140	
155	Ludo Dierckxsens	Belgium	Lampre–Daikin	108	
156	Luciano Pagliarini	Brazil	Lampre–Daikin	DNF	
157	Marco Pinotti	Italy	Lampre–Daikin	DNF	
158	Raimondas Rumšas	Lithuania	Lampre–Daikin	3	
159	Ján Svorada	Czech Republic	Lampre–Daikin	131	
161	David Etxebarria	Spain	Euskaltel–Euskadi	60	
162	Gorka Arrizabalaga	Spain	Euskaltel–Euskadi	142	
163	Unai Etxebarria	Venezuela	Euskaltel–Euskadi	141	
164	Igor Flores	Spain	Euskaltel–Euskadi	153	
165	Gorka González	Spain	Euskaltel–Euskadi	DNF	
166	Roberto Laiseka	Spain	Euskaltel–Euskadi	46	
167	Iban Mayo	Spain	Euskaltel–Euskadi	88	
168	Samuel Sánchez	Spain	Euskaltel–Euskadi	DNF	
169	Haimar Zubeldia	Spain	Euskaltel–Euskadi	39	
171	Dario Frigo	Italy	Tacconi Sport	25	
172	Massimo Apollonio	Italy	Tacconi Sport	139	
173	Gianluca Bortolami	Italy	Tacconi Sport	75	
174	Paolo Bossoni	Italy	Tacconi Sport	DNF	
175	Massimo Donati	Italy	Tacconi Sport	DNF	
176	Andrej Hauptman	Slovenia	Tacconi Sport	DNF	
177	Peter Luttenberger	Austria	Tacconi Sport	DNF	
178	Eddy Mazzoleni	Italy	Tacconi Sport	70	
179	Mauro Radaelli	Italy	Tacconi Sport	135	
181	Alexander Bocharov	Russia	AG2R Prévoyance	30	
182	Christophe Agnolutto	France	AG2R Prévoyance	144	
183	Stéphane Bergès	France	AG2R Prévoyance	150	
184	Íñigo Chaurreau	Spain	AG2R Prévoyance	41	
185	Andy Flickinger	France	AG2R Prévoyance	103	
186	Jaan Kirsipuu	Estonia	AG2R Prévoyance	DNF	
187	Thierry Loder	France	AG2R Prévoyance	98	
188	Christophe Oriol	France	AG2R Prévoyance	DNF	
189	Ludovic Turpin	France	AG2R Prévoyance	71	
191	Laurent Dufaux	Switzerland	Alessio	DNF	
192	Andrea Brognara	Italy	Alessio	119	
193	Stefano Casagranda	Italy	Alessio	DNF	
194	Davide Casarotto	Italy	Alessio	149	
195	Ivan Gotti	Italy	Alessio	23	
196	Martin Hvastija	Slovenia	Alessio	128	
197	Ruslan Ivanov	Moldova	Alessio	DNF	
198	Cristian Moreni	Italy	Alessio	66	
199	Alexandr Shefer	Kazakhstan	Alessio	DNF	
201	Patrice Halgand	France	Jean Delatour	52	
202	Stéphane Augé	France	Jean Delatour	115	
203	Jérôme Bernard	France	Jean Delatour	102	
204	Laurent Brochard	France	Jean Delatour	26	
205	Cyril Dessel	France	Jean Delatour	113	
206	Christophe Edaleine	France	Jean Delatour	100	
207	Stéphane Goubert	France	Jean Delatour	17	
208	Laurent Lefèvre	France	Jean Delatour	34	
209	Eddy Seigneur	France	Jean Delatour	143	

=== By team ===
U.S. Postal Service
No.	Rider	Pos.
~~1~~	~~Lance Armstrong (USA)~~	~~1~~
2	Viatcheslav Ekimov (RUS)	58
3	Roberto Heras (ESP)	9
4	George Hincapie (USA)	59
5	Benoît Joachim (LUX)	89
6	Floyd Landis (USA)	61
7	Pavel Padrnos (CZE)	69
8	Víctor Hugo Peña (COL)	73
9	José Luis Rubiera (ESP)	22

Team Telekom
No.	Rider	Pos.
11	Erik Zabel (GER)	82
12	Rolf Aldag (GER)	72
13	Udo Bölts (GER)	48
14	Gian Matteo Fagnini (ITA)	101
15	Giuseppe Guerini (ITA)	80
16	Danilo Hondo (GER)	104
17	Bobby Julich (USA)	37
18	Kevin Livingston (USA)	56
19	Steffen Wesemann (GER)	99

ONCE–Eroski
No.	Rider	Pos.
21	Joseba Beloki (ESP)	2
22	José Azevedo (POR)	6
23	Álvaro González de Galdeano (ESP)	DNF
24	Igor González de Galdeano (ESP)	5
25	Jörg Jaksche (GER)	31
26	Isidro Nozal (ESP)	38
27	Abraham Olano (ESP)	78
28	Mikel Pradera (ESP)	76
29	Marcos-Antonio Serrano (ESP)	33

Kelme–Costa Blanca
No.	Rider	Pos.
31	Óscar Sevilla (ESP)	DNF
32	Santiago Botero (COL)	4
33	Francisco Cabello (ESP)	111
34	José Javier Gomez (ESP)	DNF
35	José Enrique Gutiérrez (ESP)	29
36	Santiago Pérez (ESP)	DNF
37	Antonio Tauler (ESP)	DNF
38	José Ángel Vidal (ESP)	134
39	Constantino Zaballa (ESP)	116

Cofidis
No.	Rider	Pos.
41	Andrey Kivilev (KAZ)	21
42	Daniel Atienza (ESP)	DNF
43	Íñigo Cuesta (ESP)	49
44	Bingen Fernández (ESP)	79
45	Massimiliano Lelli (ITA)	14
46	Nico Mattan (BEL)	123
47	David Millar (GBR)	68
48	David Moncoutié (FRA)	13
49	Cédric Vasseur (FRA)	55

CSC–Tiscali
No.	Rider	Pos.
51	Laurent Jalabert (FRA)	42
52	Tyler Hamilton (USA)	15
53	Andrea Peron (ITA)	53
54	Jakob Piil (DEN)	125
55	Arvis Piziks (LAT)	152
56	Michael Sandstød (DEN)	DNF
57	Carlos Sastre (ESP)	10
58	Nicki Sørensen (DEN)	20
59	Paul Van Hyfte (BEL)	120

Crédit Agricole
No.	Rider	Pos.
61	Christophe Moreau (FRA)	DNF
62	Frédéric Bessy (FRA)	67
63	Sébastien Hinault (FRA)	147
64	Thor Hushovd (NOR)	112
65	Anthony Langella (FRA)	148
66	Anthony Morin (FRA)	90
67	Stuart O'Grady (AUS)	77
68	Jonathan Vaughters (USA)	DNF
69	Jens Voigt (GER)	110

Domo–Farm Frites
No.	Rider	Pos.
71	Richard Virenque (FRA)	16
72	Dave Bruylandts (BEL)	DNF
73	Enrico Cassani (ITA)	124
74	Servais Knaven (NED)	137
75	Tomáš Konecný (CZE)	65
76	Axel Merckx (BEL)	28
77	Fred Rodriguez (USA)	DNF
78	Léon van Bon (NED)	129
79	Piotr Wadecki (POL)	43

Fassa Bortolo
No.	Rider	Pos.
81	Ivan Basso (ITA)	11
82	Fabio Baldato (ITA)	132
83	Wladimir Belli (ITA)	45
84	Volodymir Hustov (UKR)	40
85	Serhiy Honchar (UKR)	64
86	Sergei Ivanov (RUS)	81
87	Nicola Loda (ITA)	121
88	Oscar Pozzi (ITA)	DNF
89	Marco Velo (ITA)	54

Française des Jeux
No.	Rider	Pos.
91	Nicolas Vogondy (FRA)	19
92	Sandy Casar (FRA)	83
93	Jimmy Casper (FRA)	DNF
94	Baden Cooke (AUS)	127
95	Jacky Durand (FRA)	DNF
96	Frédéric Guesdon (FRA)	DNF
97	Bradley McGee (AUS)	109
98	Christophe Mengin (FRA)	86
99	Jean-Cyril Robin (FRA)	32

Rabobank
No.	Rider	Pos.
101	Levi Leipheimer (USA)	8
102	Michael Boogerd (NED)	12
103	Bram de Groot (NED)	133
104	Erik Dekker (NED)	136
105	Addy Engels (NED)	94
106	Karsten Kroon (NED)	146
107	Grischa Niermann (GER)	51
108	Marc Wauters (BEL)	91
109	Beat Zberg (SUI)	27

Bonjour
No.	Rider	Pos.
111	Didier Rous (FRA)	DNF
112	Walter Bénéteau (FRA)	117
113	Franck Bouyer (FRA)	114
114	Sylvain Chavanel (FRA)	36
115	Emmanuel Magnien (FRA)	96
116	Damien Nazon (FRA)	151
117	Jérôme Pineau (FRA)	87
118	Franck Rénier (FRA)	85
119	François Simon (FRA)	DNF

Mapei–Quick-Step
No.	Rider	Pos.
121	Óscar Freire (ESP)	DNF
122	László Bodrogi (HUN)	62
123	Fabien De Waele (BEL)	DNF
124	Pedro Horrillo (ESP)	107
125	Robert Hunter (RSA)	97
126	Miguel Martinez (FRA)	44
127	Tom Steels (BEL)	DNF
128	Andrea Tafi (ITA)	106
129	Gerhard Trampusch (AUT)	63

iBanesto.com
No.	Rider	Pos.
131	Denis Menchov (RUS)	93
132	Dariusz Baranowski (POL)	24
133	Santiago Blanco (ESP)	57
134	Marzio Bruseghin (ITA)	47
135	José Vicente García (ESP)	122
136	David Latasa (ESP)	84
137	Francisco Mancebo (ESP)	7
138	Unai Osa (ESP)	18
139	Javier Pascual Rodríguez (ESP)	95

Lotto–Adecco
No.	Rider	Pos.
141	Rik Verbrugghe (BEL)	DNF
142	Mario Aerts (BEL)	50
143	Serge Baguet (BEL)	105
144	Christophe Brandt (BEL)	35
145	Hans De Clercq (BEL)	145
146	Thierry Marichal (BEL)	126
147	Robbie McEwen (AUS)	130
148	Gennady Mikhaylov (RUS)	92
149	Aart Vierhouten (NED)	DNF

Lampre–Daikin
No.	Rider	Pos.
151	Marco Serpellini (ITA)	74
152	Raivis Belohvošciks (LAT)	118
153	Rubens Bertogliati (SUI)	138
154	Alessandro Cortinovis (ITA)	140
155	Ludo Dierckxsens (BEL)	108
156	Luciano Pagliarini (BRA)	DNF
157	Marco Pinotti (ITA)	DNF
158	Raimondas Rumšas (LTU)	3
159	Ján Svorada (CZE)	131

Euskaltel–Euskadi
No.	Rider	Pos.
161	David Etxebarria (ESP)	60
162	Gorka Arrizabalaga (ESP)	142
163	Unai Etxebarria (VEN)	141
164	Igor Flores (ESP)	153
165	Gorka González (ESP)	DNF
166	Roberto Laiseka (ESP)	46
167	Iban Mayo (ESP)	88
168	Samuel Sánchez (ESP)	DNF
169	Haimar Zubeldia (ESP)	39

Tacconi Sport
No.	Rider	Pos.
171	Dario Frigo (ITA)	25
172	Massimo Apollonio (ITA)	139
173	Gianluca Bortolami (ITA)	75
174	Paolo Bossoni (ITA)	DNF
175	Massimo Donati (ITA)	DNF
176	Andrej Hauptman (SLO)	DNF
177	Peter Luttenberger (AUT)	DNF
178	Eddy Mazzoleni (ITA)	70
179	Mauro Radaelli (ITA)	135

AG2R Prévoyance
No.	Rider	Pos.
181	Alexander Bocharov (RUS)	30
182	Christophe Agnolutto (FRA)	144
183	Stéphane Bergès (FRA)	150
184	Íñigo Chaurreau (ESP)	41
185	Andy Flickinger (FRA)	103
186	Jaan Kirsipuu (EST)	DNF
187	Thierry Loder (FRA)	98
188	Christophe Oriol (FRA)	DNF
189	Ludovic Turpin (FRA)	71

Alessio
No.	Rider	Pos.
191	Laurent Dufaux (SUI)	DNF
192	Andrea Brognara (ITA)	119
193	Stefano Casagranda (ITA)	DNF
194	Davide Casarotto (ITA)	149
195	Ivan Gotti (ITA)	23
196	Martin Hvastija (SLO)	128
197	Ruslan Ivanov (MDA)	DNF
198	Cristian Moreni (ITA)	66
199	Alexandr Shefer (KAZ)	DNF

Jean Delatour
No.	Rider	Pos.
201	Patrice Halgand (FRA)	52
202	Stéphane Augé (FRA)	115
203	Jérôme Bernard (FRA)	102
204	Laurent Brochard (FRA)	26
205	Cyril Dessel (FRA)	113
206	Christophe Edaleine (FRA)	100
207	Stéphane Goubert (FRA)	17
208	Laurent Lefèvre (FRA)	34
209	Eddy Seigneur (FRA)	143
