= 1999 Tour de France, Stage 11 to Stage 20 =

Cycling race stages

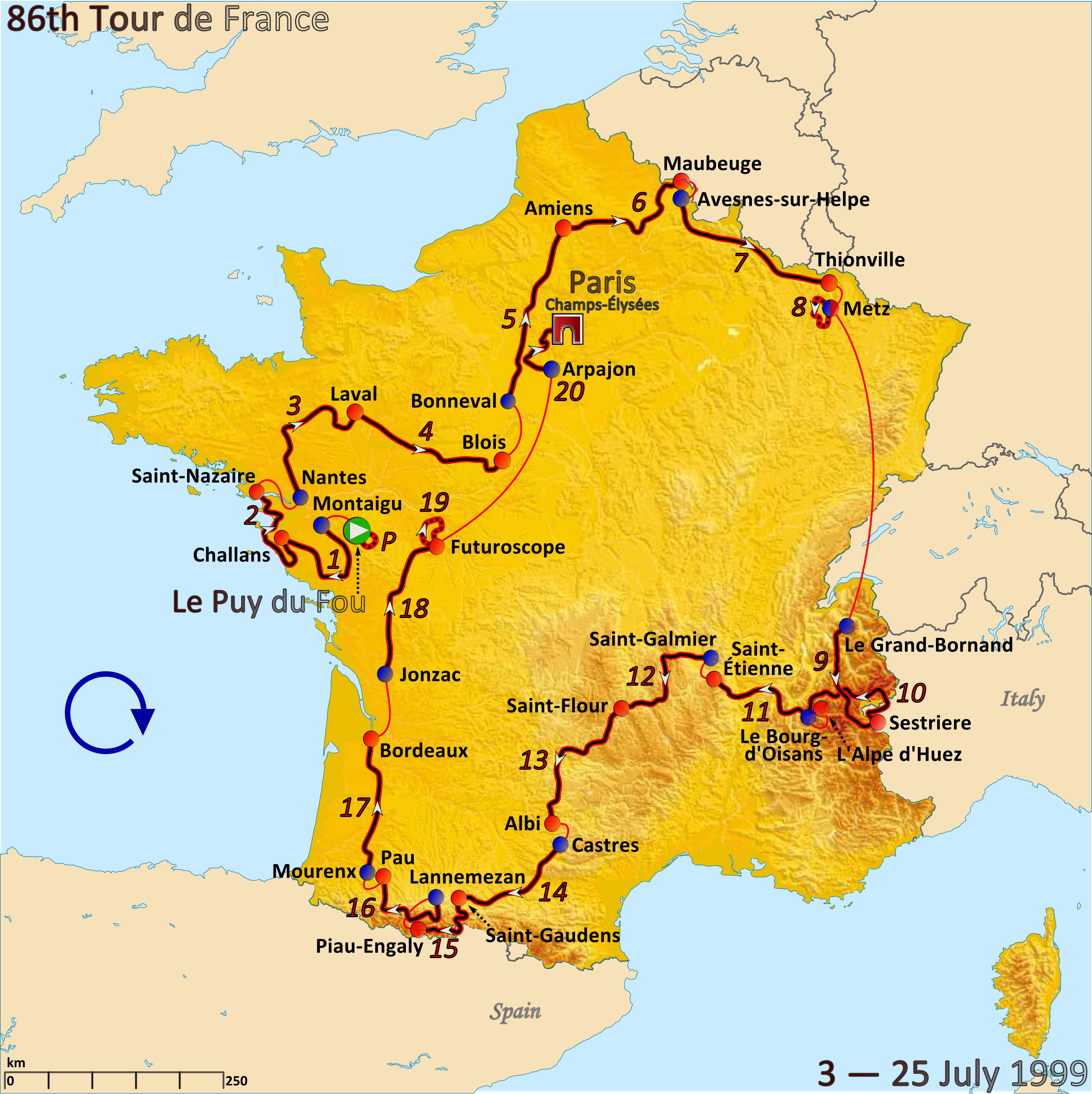
Route of the 1999 Tour de France

The 1999 Tour de France was the 86th edition of Tour de France, one of cycling's Grand Tours. The Tour began in Le Puy du Fou with a prologue individual time trial on 3 July and Stage 11 occurred on 15 July with a hilly stage from Le Bourg-d'Oisans. The race finished on the Champs-Élysées in Paris on 25 July.

== Stage 11 ==
15 July 1999 — Le Bourg-d'Oisans to Saint-Étienne, 198.5 km (123.3 mi)

Stage 11 result

Rank	Rider	Team	Time
1	Ludo Dierckxsens (BEL)	Lampre–Daikin	4h 34' 03"
2	Dimitri Konyshev (RUS)	Mercatone Uno–Bianchi	+ 1' 26"
3	Alexander Vinokourov (KAZ)	Casino–Ag2r Prévoyance	s.t.
4	Wladimir Belli (ITA)	Festina–Lotus	+ 1' 28"
5	Rik Verbrugghe (BEL)	Lotto–Mobistar	+ 1' 33"
6	Laurent Lefèvre (FRA)	Festina–Lotus	+ 3' 53"
7	Riccardo Forconi (ITA)	Mercatone Uno–Bianchi	+ 5' 07"
8	Erik Zabel (GER)	Team Telekom	+ 22' 18"
9	Robbie McEwen (AUS)	Rabobank	s.t.
10	Giampaolo Mondini (ITA)	Cantina Tollo–Alexia Alluminio	s.t.

General classification after stage 11

Rank	Rider	Team	Time
~~1~~	~~Lance Armstrong (USA)~~	~~U.S. Postal Service~~	~~51h 10' 28"~~
2	Abraham Olano (ESP)	ONCE–Deutsche Bank	+ 7' 42"
3	Alex Zülle (SUI)	Banesto	+ 7' 47"
4	Laurent Dufaux (SUI)	Saeco–Cannondale	+ 8' 07"
5	Fernando Escartín (ESP)	Kelme–Costa Blanca	+ 8' 53"
6	Richard Virenque (FRA)	Team Polti	+ 10' 01"
7	Pavel Tonkov (RUS)	Mapei–Quick-Step	+ 10' 18"
8	Daniele Nardello (ITA)	Mapei–Quick-Step	+ 10' 56"
9	Giuseppe Guerini (ITA)	Team Telekom	+ 10' 57"
10	Ángel Casero (ESP)	Vitalicio Seguros	+ 11' 11"

== Stage 12 ==
16 July 1999 — Saint-Galmier to Saint-Flour, 201.5 km (125.2 mi)

Stage 12 result

Rank	Rider	Team	Time
1	David Etxebarria (ESP)	ONCE–Deutsche Bank	4h 53' 50"
2	François Simon (FRA)	Crédit Agricole	+ 25"
3	Alberto Elli (ITA)	Team Telekom	+ 33"
4	Steve De Wolf (BEL)	Cofidis	+ 40"
5	José Castelblanco (COL)	Kelme–Costa Blanca	+ 1' 11"
6	Massimiliano Lelli (ITA)	Cofidis	+ 1' 18"
7	Frédéric Bessy (FRA)	Casino–Ag2r Prévoyance	+ 1' 24"
8	Marc Lotz (NED)	Rabobank	+ 1' 32"
9	Stéphane Heulot (FRA)	Française des Jeux	+ 1' 34"
10	Didier Rous (FRA)	Festina–Lotus	+ 1' 50"

General classification after stage 12

Rank	Rider	Team	Time
~~1~~	~~Lance Armstrong (USA)~~	~~U.S. Postal Service~~	~~56h 16' 53"~~
2	Abraham Olano (ESP)	ONCE–Deutsche Bank	+ 7' 44"
3	Alex Zülle (SUI)	Banesto	+ 7' 47"
4	Laurent Dufaux (SUI)	Saeco–Cannondale	+ 8' 07"
5	Fernando Escartín (ESP)	Kelme–Costa Blanca	+ 8' 53"
6	Stéphane Heulot (FRA)	Française des Jeux	+ 9' 10"
7	Richard Virenque (FRA)	Team Polti	+ 10' 03"
8	Pavel Tonkov (RUS)	Mapei–Quick-Step	+ 10' 18"
9	Daniele Nardello (ITA)	Mapei–Quick-Step	+ 10' 58"
10	Giuseppe Guerini (ITA)	Team Telekom	+ 10' 59"

== Stage 13 ==
17 July 1999 — Saint-Flour to Albi, 236.5 km (147.0 mi)

Stage 13 result

Rank	Rider	Team	Time
1	Salvatore Commesso (ITA)	Saeco–Cannondale	5h 52' 45"
2	Marco Serpellini (ITA)	Lampre–Daikin	+ 2"
3	Mariano Piccoli (ITA)	Lampre–Daikin	+ 2' 07"
4	Paolo Lanfranchi (ITA)	Mapei–Quick-Step	s.t.
5	Roland Meier (SUI)	Cofidis	s.t.
6	Christophe Mengin (FRA)	Française des Jeux	s.t.
7	Miguel Ángel Peña (ESP)	Banesto	s.t.
8	Javier Pascual Rodríguez (ESP)	Kelme–Costa Blanca	s.t.
9	Lylian Lebreton (FRA)	BigMat–Auber 93	+ 2' 12"
10	Francisco Cerezo (ESP)	Vitalicio Seguros	s.t.

General classification after stage 13

Rank	Rider	Team	Time
~~1~~	~~Lance Armstrong (USA)~~	~~U.S. Postal Service~~	~~62h 32' 02"~~
2	Abraham Olano (ESP)	ONCE–Deutsche Bank	+ 7' 44"
3	Alex Zülle (SUI)	Banesto	+ 7' 47"
4	Laurent Dufaux (SUI)	Saeco–Cannondale	+ 8' 07"
5	Fernando Escartín (ESP)	Kelme–Costa Blanca	+ 8' 53"
6	Stéphane Heulot (FRA)	Française des Jeux	+ 9' 10"
7	Richard Virenque (FRA)	Team Polti	+ 10' 03"
8	Pavel Tonkov (RUS)	Mapei–Quick-Step	+ 10' 18"
9	Daniele Nardello (ITA)	Mapei–Quick-Step	+ 10' 58"
10	Giuseppe Guerini (ITA)	Team Telekom	+ 11' 07"

== Stage 14 ==
18 July 1999 — Castres to Saint-Gaudens, 199 km (124 mi)

Stage 14 result

Rank	Rider	Team	Time
1	Dimitri Konyshev (RUS)	Mercatone Uno–Bianchi	4h 37' 59"
2	Gianni Faresin (ITA)	Mapei–Quick-Step	s.t.
3	Massimiliano Lelli (ITA)	Cofidis	+ 4"
4	Steffen Wesemann (GER)	Team Telekom	+ 51"
5	Jacky Durand (FRA)	Lotto–Mobistar	s.t.
6	Wladimir Belli (ITA)	Festina–Lotus	s.t.
7	Erik Zabel (GER)	Team Telekom	+ 13' 27"
8	Stuart O'Grady (AUS)	Crédit Agricole	s.t.
9	Christophe Capelle (FRA)	BigMat–Auber 93	s.t.
10	Gianpaolo Mondini (ITA)	Cantina Tollo–Alexia Alluminio	s.t.

General classification after stage 14

Rank	Rider	Team	Time
~~1~~	~~Lance Armstrong (USA)~~	~~U.S. Postal Service~~	~~67h 23' 28"~~
2	Abraham Olano (ESP)	ONCE–Deutsche Bank	+ 7' 44"
3	Alex Zülle (SUI)	Banesto	+ 7' 47"
4	Laurent Dufaux (SUI)	Saeco–Cannondale	+ 8' 07"
5	Fernando Escartín (ESP)	Kelme–Costa Blanca	+ 8' 53"
6	Stéphane Heulot (FRA)	Française des Jeux	+ 9' 10"
7	Richard Virenque (FRA)	Team Polti	+ 10' 03"
8	Pavel Tonkov (RUS)	Mapei–Quick-Step	+ 10' 18"
9	Daniele Nardello (ITA)	Mapei–Quick-Step	+ 10' 58"
10	Giuseppe Guerini (ITA)	Team Telekom	+ 11' 07"

== Stage 15 ==
20 July 1999 — Saint-Gaudens to Piau-Engaly, 173 km (107 mi)

Stage 15 result

Rank	Rider	Team	Time
1	Fernando Escartín (ESP)	Kelme–Costa Blanca	5h 19' 49"
2	Alex Zülle (SUI)	Banesto	+ 2' 01"
3	Richard Virenque (FRA)	Team Polti	s.t.
~~4~~	~~Lance Armstrong (USA)~~	~~U.S. Postal Service~~	~~+ 2' 10"~~
5	Kurt Van De Wouwer (BEL)	Lotto–Mobistar	+ 2' 37"
6	Ángel Casero (ESP)	Vitalicio Seguros	s.t.
7	Daniele Nardello (ITA)	Mapei–Quick-Step	+ 2' 45"
8	Laurent Dufaux (SUI)	Saeco–Cannondale	s.t.
9	Francisco Tomás García (ESP)	Vitalicio Seguros	+ 3' 39"
10	Wladimir Belli (ITA)	Festina–Lotus	+ 4' 00"

General classification after stage 15

Rank	Rider	Team	Time
~~1~~	~~Lance Armstrong (USA)~~	~~U.S. Postal Service~~	~~72h 45' 27"~~
2	Fernando Escartín (ESP)	Kelme–Costa Blanca	+ 6' 19"
3	Alex Zülle (SUI)	Banesto	+ 7' 26"
4	Laurent Dufaux (SUI)	Saeco–Cannondale	+ 8' 36"
5	Richard Virenque (FRA)	Team Polti	+ 9' 46"
6	Daniele Nardello (ITA)	Mapei–Quick-Step	+ 11' 33"
7	Ángel Casero (ESP)	Vitalicio Seguros	+ 11' 40"
8	Abraham Olano (ESP)	ONCE–Deutsche Bank	+ 12' 35"
9	Wladimir Belli (ITA)	Festina–Lotus	+ 15' 16"
10	Kurt Van De Wouwer (BEL)	Lotto–Mobistar	+ 16' 41"

== Stage 16 ==
21 July 1999 — Lannemezan to Pau, 192 km (119 mi)

Stage 16 result

Rank	Rider	Team	Time
1	David Etxebarria (ESP)	ONCE–Deutsche Bank	5h 17' 07"
2	Carlos Contreras (COL)	Kelme–Costa Blanca	s.t.
3	Alberto Elli (ITA)	Team Telekom	s.t.
4	Alexander Vinokourov (KAZ)	Casino–Ag2r Prévoyance	s.t.
5	José Luis Arrieta (ESP)	Banesto	s.t.
6	Marcos-Antonio Serrano (ESP)	ONCE–Deutsche Bank	+ 5"
7	Wladimir Belli (ITA)	Festina–Lotus	+ 21"
8	Pavel Tonkov (RUS)	Mapei–Quick-Step	s.t.
9	Francisco Tomás García (ESP)	Vitalicio Seguros	s.t.
10	Alex Zülle (SUI)	Banesto	s.t.

General classification after stage 16

Rank	Rider	Team	Time
~~1~~	~~Lance Armstrong (USA)~~	~~U.S. Postal Service~~	~~78h 02' 53"~~
2	Fernando Escartín (ESP)	Kelme–Costa Blanca	+ 6' 15"
3	Alex Zülle (SUI)	Banesto	+ 7' 28"
4	Laurent Dufaux (SUI)	Saeco–Cannondale	+ 10' 30"
5	Richard Virenque (FRA)	Team Polti	+ 11' 40"
6	Daniele Nardello (ITA)	Mapei–Quick-Step	+ 13' 27"
7	Ángel Casero (ESP)	Vitalicio Seguros	+ 13' 34"
8	Abraham Olano (ESP)	ONCE–Deutsche Bank	+ 14' 29"
9	Wladimir Belli (ITA)	Festina–Lotus	+ 15' 14"
10	Kurt Van De Wouwer (BEL)	Lotto–Mobistar	+ 18' 35"

== Stage 17 ==
22 July 1999 — Mourenx to Bordeaux, 200 km (120 mi)

Stage 17 result

Rank	Rider	Team	Time
1	Tom Steels (BEL)	Mapei–Quick-Step	4h 22' 29"
2	Robbie McEwen (AUS)	Rabobank	s.t.
3	Erik Zabel (GER)	Team Telekom	s.t.
4	George Hincapie (USA)	U.S. Postal Service	s.t.
5	Silvio Martinello (ITA)	Team Polti	s.t.
6	Lars Michaelsen (DEN)	Française des Jeux	s.t.
7	Pascal Chanteur (FRA)	Casino–Ag2r Prévoyance	s.t.
8	Gianpaolo Mondini (ITA)	Cantina Tollo–Alexia Alluminio	s.t.
9	Christophe Capelle (ESP)	BigMat–Auber 93	s.t.
10	Alexander Vinokourov (KAZ)	Casino–Ag2r Prévoyance	s.t.

General classification after stage 17

Rank	Rider	Team	Time
~~1~~	~~Lance Armstrong (USA)~~	~~U.S. Postal Service~~	~~82h 25' 30"~~
2	Fernando Escartín (ESP)	Kelme–Costa Blanca	+ 6' 15"
3	Alex Zülle (SUI)	Banesto	+ 7' 28"
4	Laurent Dufaux (SUI)	Saeco–Cannondale	+ 10' 30"
5	Richard Virenque (FRA)	Team Polti	+ 11' 40"
6	Daniele Nardello (ITA)	Mapei–Quick-Step	+ 13' 19"
7	Ángel Casero (ESP)	Vitalicio Seguros	+ 13' 34"
8	Abraham Olano (ESP)	ONCE–Deutsche Bank	+ 14' 29"
9	Wladimir Belli (ITA)	Festina–Lotus	+ 15' 14"
10	Kurt Van De Wouwer (BEL)	Lotto–Mobistar	+ 18' 27"

== Stage 18 ==
23 July 1999 — Jonzac to Futuroscope, 187 km (116 mi)

Stage 18 result

Rank	Rider	Team	Time
1	Gianpaolo Mondini (ITA)	Cantina Tollo–Alexia Alluminio	4h 17' 43"
2	Jean-Cyril Robin (FRA)	Française des Jeux	+ 3"
3	Alexander Vinokourov (KAZ)	Casino–Ag2r Prévoyance	s.t.
4	Mariano Piccoli (ITA)	Lampre–Daikin	s.t.
5	Claude Lamour (FRA)	Cofidis	s.t.
6	François Simon (FRA)	Crédit Agricole	s.t.
7	Stefano Garzelli (ITA)	Mercatone Uno–Bianchi	s.t.
8	Jörg Jaksche (GER)	Team Telekom	s.t.
9	Elio Aggiano (ITA)	Vitalicio Seguros	s.t.
10	Thierry Bourguignon (FRA)	BigMat–Auber 93	s.t.

General classification after stage 18

Rank	Rider	Team	Time
~~1~~	~~Lance Armstrong (USA)~~	~~U.S. Postal Service~~	~~86h 46' 20"~~
2	Fernando Escartín (ESP)	Kelme–Costa Blanca	+ 6' 15"
3	Alex Zülle (SUI)	Banesto	+ 7' 28"
4	Laurent Dufaux (SUI)	Saeco–Cannondale	+ 10' 30"
5	Richard Virenque (FRA)	Team Polti	+ 11' 40"
6	Daniele Nardello (ITA)	Mapei–Quick-Step	+ 13' 19"
7	Ángel Casero (ESP)	Vitalicio Seguros	+ 13' 34"
8	Abraham Olano (ESP)	ONCE–Deutsche Bank	+ 14' 29"
9	Wladimir Belli (ITA)	Festina–Lotus	+ 15' 14"
10	Kurt Van De Wouwer (BEL)	Lotto–Mobistar	+ 18' 27"

== Stage 19 ==
24 July 1999 — Futuroscope, 57 km (35 mi) (ITT)

Stage 19 result

Rank	Rider	Team	Time
~~1~~	~~Lance Armstrong (USA)~~	~~U.S. Postal Service~~	~~1h 08' 17"~~
2	Alex Zülle (SUI)	Banesto	+ 9"
3	Tyler Hamilton (USA)	U.S. Postal Service	+ 1' 34"
4	Ángel Casero (ESP)	Vitalicio Seguros	+ 1' 36"
5	Rik Verbrugghe (BEL)	Lotto–Mobistar	+ 2' 02"
6	Abraham Olano (ESP)	ONCE–Deutsche Bank	+ 2' 18"
7	Wladimir Belli (ITA)	Festina–Lotus	+ 2' 22"
8	Álvaro González de Galdeano (ESP)	Vitalicio Seguros	+ 2' 28"
9	Jens Voigt (GER)	Crédit Agricole	+ 2' 45"
10	Stuart O'Grady (AUS)	Crédit Agricole	+ 2' 47"

General classification after stage 19

Rank	Rider	Team	Time
~~1~~	~~Lance Armstrong (USA)~~	~~U.S. Postal Service~~	~~87h 54' 37"~~
2	Alex Zülle (SUI)	Banesto	+ 7' 37"
3	Fernando Escartín (ESP)	Kelme–Costa Blanca	+ 10' 26"
4	Laurent Dufaux (SUI)	Saeco–Cannondale	+ 14' 43"
5	Ángel Casero (ESP)	Vitalicio Seguros	+ 15' 11"
6	Abraham Olano (ESP)	ONCE–Deutsche Bank	+ 16' 47"
7	Daniele Nardello (ITA)	Mapei–Quick-Step	+ 17' 02"
8	Richard Virenque (FRA)	Team Polti	+ 17' 28"
9	Wladimir Belli (ITA)	Festina–Lotus	+ 17' 37"
10	Andrea Peron (ITA)	ONCE–Deutsche Bank	+ 23' 10"

== Stage 20 ==
25 July 1999 — Arpajon to Paris Champs-Élysées, 160 km (99 mi)

Stage 20 result

Rank	Rider	Team	Time
1	Robbie McEwen (AUS)	Rabobank	3h 37' 39"
2	Erik Zabel (GER)	Team Telekom	s.t.
3	Silvio Martinello (ITA)	Team Polti	s.t.
4	Stuart O'Grady (AUS)	Crédit Agricole	s.t.
5	Carlos Da Cruz (FRA)	BigMat–Auber 93	s.t.
6	Lars Michaelsen (DEN)	Française des Jeux	s.t.
7	Salvatore Commesso (ITA)	Saeco–Cannondale	s.t.
8	Tom Steels (BEL)	Mapei–Quick-Step	s.t.
9	Steffen Wesemann (GER)	Team Telekom	s.t.
10	Gianpaolo Mondini (ITA)	Cantina Tollo–Alexia Alluminio	s.t.

General classification after stage 20

Rank	Rider	Team	Time
~~1~~	~~Lance Armstrong (USA)~~	~~U.S. Postal Service~~	~~91h 32' 16"~~
2	Alex Zülle (SUI)	Banesto	+ 7' 37"
3	Fernando Escartín (ESP)	Kelme–Costa Blanca	+ 10' 26"
4	Laurent Dufaux (SUI)	Saeco–Cannondale	+ 14' 43"
5	Ángel Casero (ESP)	Vitalicio Seguros	+ 15' 11"
6	Abraham Olano (ESP)	ONCE–Deutsche Bank	+ 16' 47"
7	Daniele Nardello (ITA)	Mapei–Quick-Step	+ 17' 02"
8	Richard Virenque (FRA)	Team Polti	+ 17' 28"
9	Wladimir Belli (ITA)	Festina–Lotus	+ 17' 37"
10	Andrea Peron (ITA)	ONCE–Deutsche Bank	+ 23' 10"
