= 1999 Tour de France =

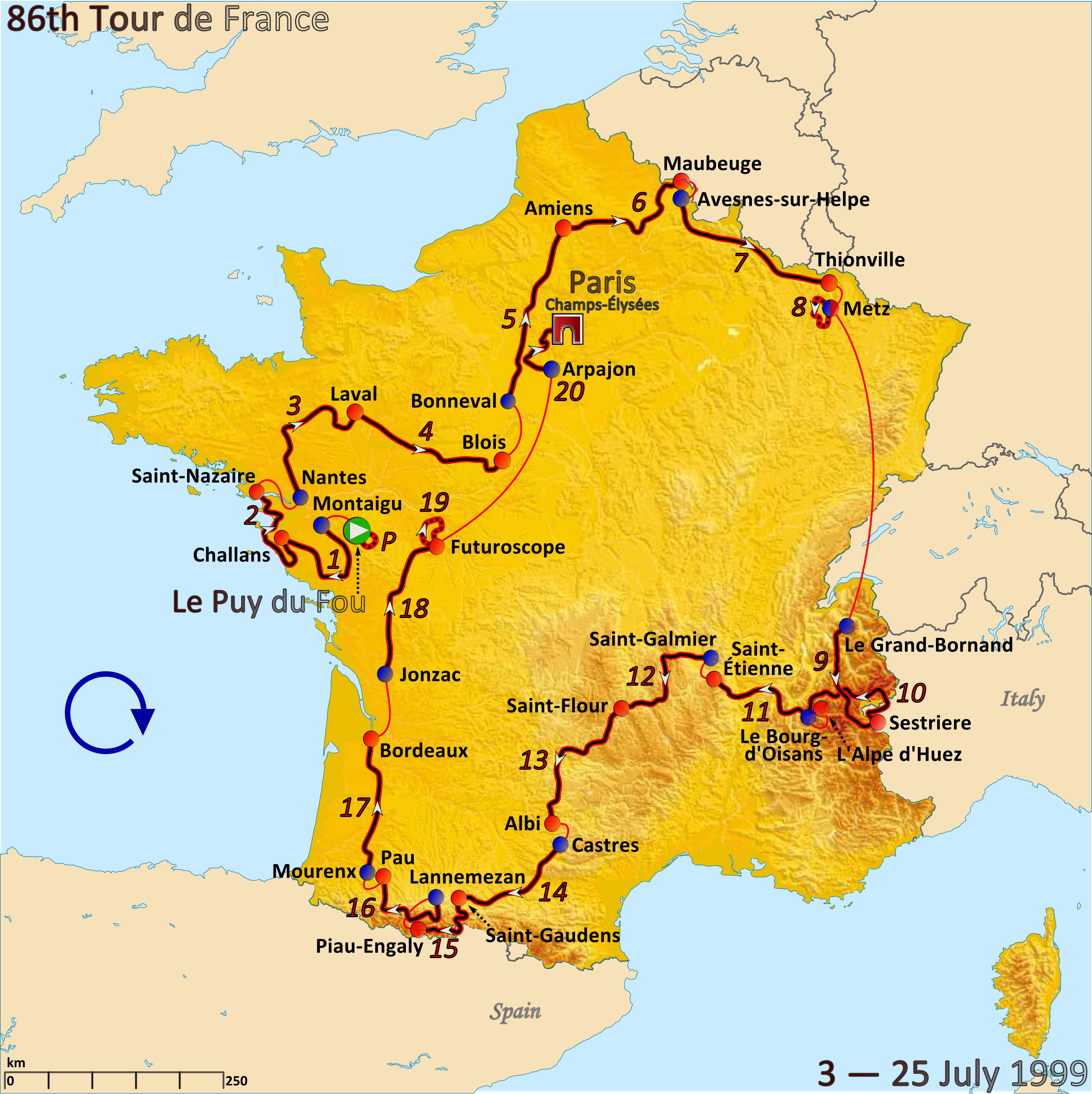
- Route of the 1999 Tour de France

Race details
- Dates: 3–25 July 1999
- Stages: 20 + Prologue
- Distance: 3,870 km (2,400 mi)
- Winning time: 91h 32' 16"

Results
	Winner	~~Lance Armstrong~~ none (Note: On 24 August 2012, the United States Anti-Doping Agency announced that they had disqualified Armstrong from all his results since 1998, including his victory in the 1999 Tour de France. The Union Cycliste Internationale, responsible for the international cycling, confirmed this verdict on 22 October 2012.)	
	Second	Alex Zülle (SUI)	(Banesto)
	Third	Fernando Escartín (ESP)	(Kelme–Costa Blanca)
Jersey awarded to the points classification winner	Points	Erik Zabel (GER)	(Team Telekom)
Jersey awarded to the mountains classification winner	Mountains	Richard Virenque (FRA)	(Polti)
	Young rider	Benoît Salmon (FRA)	(Casino–Ag2r Prévoyance)
Jersey awarded to the combativity classification winner	Combativity	Jacky Durand (FRA)	(Lotto–Mobistar)
	Team	Banesto	

The 1999 Tour de France was a multiple stage bicycle race held from 3 to 25 July, and the 86th edition of the Tour de France. It has no overall winner—although American cyclist Lance Armstrong originally won the event, the United States Anti-Doping Agency announced in August 2012 that they had disqualified Armstrong from all his results since 1998, including his seven consecutive Tour de France wins from 1999 to 2005 (which were, originally, the most wins in the event's history); the Union Cycliste Internationale confirmed the result.

There were no French stage winners for the first time since the 1926 Tour de France. Additionally, Mario Cipollini won four stages in a row, setting the post-World War II record for consecutive stage wins (breaking the record of three, set by Gino Bartali in 1948). Stage 4 set a record for the fastest mass-start stage on the Tour de France which stood until 2026, with an average speed of 50.4 km/h (31.3 mph) thanks to a strong tailwind.

== Teams ==
After the doping controversies in the 1998 Tour de France, the Tour organisation banned some riders from the race, including Richard Virenque, Laurent Roux and Philippe Gaumont, manager Manolo Saiz and the entire TVM–Farm Frites team. Virenque's team Polti then appealed at the UCI against this decision, and the UCI then forced the organisers of the Tour, Amaury Sport Organisation (ASO), to allow Virenque and Saiz entry in the Tour. Initially, the Vini Caldirola team had been selected, but after their team leader Serhiy Honchar failed a blood test in the 1999 Tour de Suisse, the ASO removed Vini Caldirola from the starting list, and replaced them by Cantina Tollo–Alexia Alluminio, the first reserve team. Each team was allowed to field nine cyclists.

The teams entering the race were:

Qualified teams

- Banesto
- Casino–Ag2r Prévoyance
- Cantina Tollo–Alexia Alluminio
- Cofidis
- Crédit Agricole
- Festina–Lotus
- Française des Jeux
- Kelme–Costa Blanca
- Lotto–Mobistar
- Mapei–Quick-Step
- Mercatone Uno–Bianchi
- ONCE–Deutsche Bank
- Team Polti
- Rabobank
- Saeco–Cannondale
- Team Telekom
- Vitalicio Seguros

Invited teams

- BigMat–Auber 93
- Lampre–Daikin
- U.S. Postal Service

== Pre-race favourites ==
Bookmaker William Hill listed Olano at 3-1 odds, followed by Boogerd at 4–1, Tonkov: 5-1, Armstrong: 6-1, Virenque: 8-1 and Dufaux: 10–1.

== Route and stages ==
The highest point of elevation in the race was 2,642 m (8,668 ft) at the summit of the Col du Galibier mountain pass on stage 9.

Stage characteristics and winners
Stage	Date	Course	Distance	Type	Winner
P	3 July	Le Puy du Fou	6.8 km (4.2 mi)	Individual time trial	~~Lance Armstrong~~ (USA)
1	4 July	Montaigu to Challans	208.0 km (129.2 mi)	Plain stage	Jaan Kirsipuu (EST)
2	5 July	Challans to Saint-Nazaire	176.0 km (109.4 mi)	Plain stage	Tom Steels (BEL)
3	6 July	Nantes to Laval	194.5 km (120.9 mi)	Plain stage	Tom Steels (BEL)
4	7 July	Laval to Blois	194.5 km (120.9 mi)	Plain stage	Mario Cipollini (ITA)
5	8 July	Bonneval to Amiens	233.5 km (145.1 mi)	Plain stage	Mario Cipollini (ITA)
6	9 July	Amiens to Maubeuge	171.5 km (106.6 mi)	Plain stage	Mario Cipollini (ITA)
7	10 July	Avesnes-sur-Helpe to Thionville	227.0 km (141.1 mi)	Plain stage	Mario Cipollini (ITA)
8	11 July	Metz	56.5 km (35.1 mi)	Individual time trial	~~Lance Armstrong~~ (USA)
	12 July	Le Grand-Bornand		Rest day	
9	13 July	Le Grand-Bornand to Sestrières	213.5 km (132.7 mi)	Stage with mountain(s)	~~Lance Armstrong~~ (USA)
10	14 July	Sestrières to Alpe d'Huez	220.5 km (137.0 mi)	Stage with mountain(s)	Giuseppe Guerini (ITA)
11	15 July	Le Bourg-d'Oisans to Saint-Étienne	198.5 km (123.3 mi)	Hilly stage	Ludo Dierckxsens (BEL)
12	16 July	Saint-Galmier to Saint-Flour	201.5 km (125.2 mi)	Hilly stage	David Etxebarria (ESP)
13	17 July	Saint-Flour to Albi	236.5 km (147.0 mi)	Hilly stage	Salvatore Commesso (ITA)
14	18 July	Castres to Saint-Gaudens	199.0 km (123.7 mi)	Plain stage	Dmitri Konychev (RUS)
	19 July	Saint-Gaudens		Rest day	
15	20 July	Saint-Gaudens to Piau-Engaly	173.0 km (107.5 mi)	Stage with mountain(s)	Fernando Escartín (ESP)
16	21 July	Lannemezan to Pau	192.0 km (119.3 mi)	Stage with mountain(s)	David Etxebarria (ESP)
17	22 July	Mourenx to Bordeaux	200.0 km (124.3 mi)	Plain stage	Tom Steels (BEL)
18	23 July	Jonzac to Futuroscope	187.5 km (116.5 mi)	Plain stage	Gianpaolo Mondini (ITA)
19	24 July	Futuroscope	57.0 km (35.4 mi)	Individual time trial	~~Lance Armstrong~~ (USA)
20	25 July	Arpajon to Paris (Champs-Élysées)	143.5 km (89.2 mi)	Plain stage	Robbie McEwen (AUS)
	Total		3,870 km (2,405 mi)		

== Race overview ==
Following the Festina Affair of the previous year the 1999 edition was billed as the "Tour of Renewal" from the very beginning.

Stage 4 from Laval to Blois over a distance of 194.5 km (120.9 mi) set a new record for the fastest massed-start stage on the Tour de France, with the stage won by Mario Cipollini at an average of 50.4 km/h (31.3 mph) with the help of a tailwind. The record stood until stage 11 of the 2026 race.

=== Doping ===
This tour also saw the mistreatment of Christophe Bassons by his fellow riders of the peloton (notably Armstrong) for speaking out against doping. The 1998 tour had been marred by the Festina doping scandal. Bassons later told Bicycling, "The 1999 Tour was supposed to be the "Tour of Renewal", but I was certain that doping had not disappeared." He quit the tour without finishing after "cracking" mentally due to his treatment by the peloton, especially in stage 10.

Subsequent to Armstrong's statement to withdraw his fight against United States Anti-Doping Agency's (USADA) charges, on 24 August 2012, the USADA said it would ban Armstrong for life and stripped him of his record seven Tour de France titles. Later that day it was confirmed in a USADA statement that Armstrong was banned for life and would be disqualified from any and all competitive results obtained on and subsequent to 1 August 1998, including forfeiture of any medals, titles, winnings, finishes, points and prizes. On 22 October 2012, the Union Cycliste Internationale endorsed the USADA sanctions, and decided not to award victories to any other rider or upgrade other placings in any of the affected events.

=== Other incidents ===
The 1999 edition of Tour de France had two bizarre moments. The first was on stage 2 when a 25-rider pile-up occurred at Passage du Gois. The Passage du Gois is a two-mile causeway which depending on the tide can be under water. A rider came down in the middle of the field during the passage, leading to the crash that cost pre-race favourites Alex Zülle, Christophe Rinero and Michael Boogerd more than five minutes to the lead group. The second bizarre incident was on stage 10, one kilometre from the summit of Alpe d'Huez. Leading Italian rider Giuseppe Guerini was confronted by a spectator holding a camera in the middle of the road. Guerini hit the spectator but recovered and went on to win the stage.

== Classification leadership and minor prizes ==
There were several classifications in the 1999 Tour de France. The most important was the general classification, calculated by adding each cyclist's finishing times on each stage. The cyclist with the least accumulated time was the race leader, identified by the yellow jersey; the winner of this classification is considered the winner of the Tour.

Additionally, there was a points classification, which awarded a green jersey. In the points classification, cyclists got points for finishing among the best in a stage finish, or in intermediate sprints. The cyclist with the most points led the classification, and was identified with a green jersey.

There was also a mountains classification. The organisation had categorised some climbs as either hors catégorie, first, second, third, or fourth-category; points for this classification were won by the first cyclists that reached the top of these climbs first, with more points available for the higher-categorised climbs. The cyclist with the most points lead the classification, and wore a white jersey with red polka dots.

The fourth individual classification was the young rider classification, which was not marked by a jersey. This was decided the same way as the general classification, but only riders under 26 years were eligible.

For the team classification, the times of the best three cyclists per team on each stage were added; the leading team was the team with the lowest total time.

In addition, there was a combativity award given after each mass-start stage to the cyclist considered most combative, who wore a red number bib the next stage. The decision was made by a jury composed of journalists who gave points. The cyclist with the most points from votes in all stages led the combativity classification. Jacky Durand won this classification, and was given overall the super-combativity award. The Souvenir Henri Desgrange was given in honour of Tour founder Henri Desgrange to the first rider to pass the summit of the Col du Galibier on stage 9. This prize was won by José Luis Arrieta.

Classification leadership by stage
Stage	Winner	General classification	Points classification	Mountains classification	Young rider classification (Note: A white jersey was not awarded to the leader of the young rider classification between 1989 and 1999.)	Team classification	Combativity	
Stage	Winner	General classification	Points classification	Mountains classification	Young rider classification	Team classification	Award	Classification
P	~~Lance Armstrong~~	~~Lance Armstrong~~	~~Lance Armstrong~~	Mariano Piccoli	Rik Verbrugghe	U.S. Postal Service	no award	
1	Jaan Kirsipuu	~~Lance Armstrong~~	Jaan Kirsipuu	Mariano Piccoli	Rik Verbrugghe	U.S. Postal Service	Thierry Gouvenou	Thierry Gouvenou
2	Tom Steels	Jaan Kirsipuu	Jaan Kirsipuu	Mariano Piccoli	Christian Vande Velde	U.S. Postal Service	Jacky Durand	Thierry Gouvenou
3	Tom Steels	Jaan Kirsipuu	Jaan Kirsipuu	Mariano Piccoli	Christian Vande Velde	U.S. Postal Service	Frédéric Guesdon	Thierry Gouvenou
4	Mario Cipollini	Jaan Kirsipuu	Jaan Kirsipuu	Mariano Piccoli	Christian Vande Velde	U.S. Postal Service	Gianpaolo Mondini	Thierry Gouvenou
5	Mario Cipollini	Jaan Kirsipuu	Jaan Kirsipuu	Mariano Piccoli	Christian Vande Velde	U.S. Postal Service	Mariano Piccoli	Thierry Gouvenou
6	Mario Cipollini	Jaan Kirsipuu	Jaan Kirsipuu	Mariano Piccoli	Christian Vande Velde	U.S. Postal Service	François Simon	Thierry Gouvenou
7	Mario Cipollini	Jaan Kirsipuu	Jaan Kirsipuu	Mariano Piccoli	Christian Vande Velde	U.S. Postal Service	Lylian Lebreton	Thierry Gouvenou
8	~~Lance Armstrong~~	~~Lance Armstrong~~	Jaan Kirsipuu	Mariano Piccoli	Magnus Bäckstedt	U.S. Postal Service	no award	Thierry Gouvenou
9	~~Lance Armstrong~~	~~Lance Armstrong~~	Stuart O'Grady	Richard Virenque	Benoît Salmon	U.S. Postal Service	José Luis Arrieta	Thierry Gouvenou
10	Giuseppe Guerini	~~Lance Armstrong~~	Stuart O'Grady	Richard Virenque	Benoît Salmon	ONCE–Deutsche Bank	Stéphane Heulot	Thierry Gouvenou
11	Ludo Dierckxsens	~~Lance Armstrong~~	Stuart O'Grady	Richard Virenque	Benoît Salmon	Festina–Lotus	Rik Verbrugghe	Thierry Gouvenou
12	David Etxebarria	~~Lance Armstrong~~	Erik Zabel	Richard Virenque	Benoît Salmon	Festina–Lotus	Massimiliano Lelli	Thierry Gouvenou
13	Salvatore Commesso	~~Lance Armstrong~~	Erik Zabel	Richard Virenque	Benoît Salmon	ONCE–Deutsche Bank	Roland Meier	Thierry Gouvenou
14	Dimitri Konishev	~~Lance Armstrong~~	Erik Zabel	Richard Virenque	Benoît Salmon	Festina–Lotus	Jacky Durand	Jacky Durand
15	Fernando Escartín	~~Lance Armstrong~~	Erik Zabel	Richard Virenque	Benoît Salmon	Banesto	Fernando Escartín	Jacky Durand
16	David Etxebarria	~~Lance Armstrong~~	Erik Zabel	Richard Virenque	Benoît Salmon	Banesto	Pavel Tonkov	Jacky Durand
17	Tom Steels	~~Lance Armstrong~~	Erik Zabel	Richard Virenque	Benoît Salmon	Banesto	Carlos Da Cruz	Jacky Durand
18	Gianpaolo Mondini	~~Lance Armstrong~~	Erik Zabel	Richard Virenque	Benoît Salmon	Banesto	Frédéric Bessy	Jacky Durand
19	~~Lance Armstrong~~	~~Lance Armstrong~~	Erik Zabel	Richard Virenque	Benoît Salmon	Banesto	no award	Jacky Durand
20	Robbie McEwen	~~Lance Armstrong~~	Erik Zabel	Richard Virenque	Benoît Salmon	Banesto	Anthony Morin	Jacky Durand
Final		~~Lance Armstrong~~	Erik Zabel	Richard Virenque	Benoît Salmon	Banesto	Jacky Durand	

- In stage 1, Alex Zülle wore the green jersey.
- In stages 3 through 6, Tom Steels wore the green jersey.
- In stage 7, Erik Zabel wore the green jersey.
- In stage 8, Mario Cipollini wore the green jersey.

== Final standings ==
Legend
Green jersey	Denotes the leader of the points classification	Polka dot jersey	Denotes the leader of the mountains classification
A white jersey with a red number bib.	Denotes the winner of the super-combativity award		

=== General classification ===
Final general classification (1–10)
Rank	Rider	Team	Time
1	~~Lance Armstrong (USA)~~	~~U.S. Postal Service~~	~~91h 32' 16"~~
2	Alex Zülle (SUI)	Banesto	+ 7' 37"
3	Fernando Escartín (ESP)	Kelme–Costa Blanca	+ 10' 26"
4	Laurent Dufaux (SUI)	Saeco–Cannondale	+ 14' 43"
5	Ángel Casero (ESP)	Vitalicio Seguros	+ 15' 11"
6	Abraham Olano (ESP)	ONCE–Deutsche Bank	+ 16' 47"
7	Daniele Nardello (ITA)	Mapei–Quick-Step	+ 17' 02"
8	Richard Virenque (FRA)	Team Polti	+ 17' 28"
9	Wladimir Belli (ITA)	Festina–Lotus	+ 17' 37"
10	Andrea Peron (ITA)	ONCE–Deutsche Bank	+ 23' 10"

Final general classification (11–141)
Rank	Rider	Team	Time
11	Kurt Van De Wouwer (BEL)	Lotto–Mobistar	+ 23' 32"
12	David Etxebarria (ESP)	ONCE–Deutsche Bank	+ 26' 41"
13	Tyler Hamilton (USA)	U.S. Postal Service	+ 26' 53"
14	Stéphane Heulot (FRA)	Française des Jeux	+ 27' 58"
15	Roland Meier (SUI)	Cofidis	+ 28' 44"
16	Benoit Salmon (FRA)	Casino–Ag2r Prévoyance	+ 28' 59"
17	Alberto Elli (ITA)	Team Telekom	+ 33' 39"
18	Paolo Lanfranchi (ITA)	Mapei–Quick-Step	+ 34' 14"
19	Carlos Contreras (COL)	Kelme–Costa Blanca	+ 34' 53"
20	Georg Totschnig (AUT)	Team Telekom	+ 37' 10"
21	Mario Aerts (BEL)	Lotto–Mobistar	+ 39' 21"
22	Giuseppe Guerini (ITA)	Team Telekom	+ 39' 29"
23	Gianni Faresin (ITA)	Mapei–Quick-Step	+ 40' 28"
24	Álvaro González de Galdeano (ESP)	Vitalicio Seguros	+ 43' 39"
25	Marcos Antonio Serrano (ESP)	ONCE–Deutsche Bank	+ 45' 03"
26	Francisco Tomas García (ESP)	Vitalicio Seguros	+ 45' 31"
27	Christophe Moreau (FRA)	Festina–Lotus	+ 45' 34"
28	Francisco Mancebo (ESP)	Banesto	+ 50' 31"
29	Luis Perez (ESP)	ONCE–Deutsche Bank	+ 52' 53"
30	François Simon (FRA)	Crédit Agricole	+ 53' 21"
31	Armin Meier (SUI)	Saeco–Cannondale	+ 1h 00' 10"
32	Stefano Garzelli (ITA)	Mercatone Uno–Bianchi	+ 1h 00' 45"
33	Javier Pascual Rodríguez (ESP)	Kelme–Costa Blanca	+ 1h 01' 20"
34	Massimiliano Lelli (ITA)	Cofidis	+ 1h 01' 27"
35	Alexander Vinokourov (KAZ)	Casino–Ag2r Prévoyance	+ 1h 02' 23"
36	Kevin Livingston (USA)	U.S. Postal Service	+ 1h 06' 10"
37	José Castelblanco (COL)	Kelme–Costa Blanca	+ 1h 08' 05"
38	Salvatore Commesso (ITA)	Saeco–Cannondale	+ 1h 09' 15"
39	César Solaun (ESP)	Banesto	+ 1h 10' 01"
40	Udo Bölts (GER)	Team Telekom	+ 1h 11' 51"
41	Steve De Wolf (BEL)	Cofidis	+ 1h 11' 54"
42	Frédérick Bessy (FRA)	Casino–Ag2r Prévoyance	+ 1h 15' 26"
43	Miguel Ángel Peña (ESP)	Banesto	+ 1h 19' 26"
44	Laurent Madouas (FRA)	Festina–Lotus	+ 1h 20' 42"
45	Geert Verheyen (BEL)	Lotto–Mobistar	+ 1h 23' 24"
46	José Luis Arrieta (ESP)	Banesto	+ 1h 24' 29"
47	Francisco Javier Cerezo (ESP)	Vitalicio Seguros	+ 1h 26' 50"
48	Thierry Bourguignon (FRA)	BigMat–Auber 93	+ 1h 27' 43"
49	Manuel Fernández (ESP)	Mapei–Quick-Step	+ 1h 30' 20"
50	Mariano Piccoli (ITA)	Lampre–Daikin	+ 1h 31' 21"
51	Lylian Lebreton (FRA)	BigMat–Auber 93	+ 1h 32' 51"
52	Jean-Cyril Robin (FRA)	Française des Jeux	+ 1h 33' 14"
53	Marco Fincato (ITA)	Mercatone Uno–Bianchi	+ 1h 36' 57"
54	Jon Odriozola (ESP)	Banesto	+ 1h 41' 55"
55	Marco Serpellini (ITA)	Lampre–Daikin	+ 1h 42' 04"
56	Michael Boogerd (NED)	Rabobank	+ 1h 42' 22"
57	Fabian Jeker (SUI)	Festina–Lotus	+ 1h 42' 25"
58	Rafael Díaz Justo (ESP)	ONCE–Deutsche Bank	+ 1h 43' 36"
59	José Javier Gomez (ESP)	Kelme–Costa Blanca	+ 1h 45' 50"
60	Jens Voigt (GER)	Crédit Agricole	+ 1h 47' 47"
61	Santos González (ESP)	ONCE–Deutsche Bank	+ 1h 48' 21"
62	Dmitri Konychev (RUS)	Mercatone Uno–Bianchi	+ 1h 49' 10"
63	Peter Farazijn (BEL)	Cofidis	+ 1h 55' 01"
64	Hernán Buenahora (COL)	Vitalicio Seguros	+ 1h 55' 33"
65	Frankie Andreu (USA)	U.S. Postal Service	+ 1h 59' 01"
66	Stefano Cattai (ITA)	Team Polti	+ 1h 59' 49"
67	Christophe Oriol (FRA)	Casino–Ag2r Prévoyance	+ 2h 01' 06"
68	José Vicente Garcia (ESP)	Banesto	+ 2h 01' 46"
69	Fabrice Gougot (FRA)	Casino–Ag2r Prévoyance	+ 2h 02' 05"
70	Christophe Mengin (FRA)	Française des Jeux	+ 2h 04' 03"
71	Rik Verbrugghe (BEL)	Lotto–Mobistar	+ 2h 04' 31"
72	Marc Lotz (NED)	Rabobank	+ 2h 08' 08"
73	Steffen Wesemann (GER)	Team Telekom	+ 2h 09' 22"
74	Stéphane Goubert (FRA)	Team Polti	+ 2h 10' 58"
75	José Luis Rebollo (ESP)	ONCE–Deutsche Bank	+ 2h 12' 57"
76	Prudencio Induráin (ESP)	Vitalicio Seguros	+ 2h 14' 15"
77	Laurent Brochard (FRA)	Festina–Lotus	+ 2h 14' 42"
78	George Hincapie (USA)	U.S. Postal Service	+ 2h 16' 35"
79	Christophe Rinero (FRA)	Cofidis	+ 2h 16' 35"
80	Jörg Jaksche (GER)	Team Telekom	+ 2h 16' 44"
81	Giampaolo Mondini (ITA)	Cantina Tollo–Alexia Alluminio	+ 2h 17' 34"
82	Gilles Maignan (FRA)	Casino–Ag2r Prévoyance	+ 2h 18' 02"
83	Cédric Vasseur (FRA)	Crédit Agricole	+ 2h 18' 23"
84	Maarten den Bakker (NED)	Rabobank	+ 2h 19' 03"
85	Christian Vande Velde (USA)	U.S. Postal Service	+ 2h 23' 58"
86	Javier Otxoa (ESP)	Kelme–Costa Blanca	+ 2h 24' 14"
87	Riccardo Forconi (ITA)	Mercatone Uno–Bianchi	+ 2h 25' 02"
88	Laurent Lefèvre (FRA)	Festina–Lotus	+ 2h 25' 08"
89	Erik Zabel (GER)	Team Telekom	+ 2h 26' 01"
90	Dominique Rault (FRA)	BigMat–Auber 93	+ 2h 27' 17"
91	Pascal Chanteur (FRA)	Casino–Ag2r Prévoyance	+ 2h 28' 00"
92	Elio Aggiano (ITA)	Vitalicio Seguros	+ 2h 28' 33"
93	Alexei Sivakov (RUS)	BigMat–Auber 93	+ 2h 29' 40"
94	Stuart O'Grady (AUS)	Crédit Agricole	+ 2h 30' 07"
95	Massimo Giunti (ITA)	Cantina Tollo–Alexia Alluminio	+ 2h 30' 25"
96	Thierry Gouvenou (FRA)	BigMat–Auber 93	+ 2h 32' 11"
97	Patrick Jonker (AUS)	Rabobank	+ 2h 32' 20"
98	David Navas (ESP)	Banesto	+ 2h 33' 31"
99	Fabio Sacchi (ITA)	Team Polti	+ 2h 33' 39"
100	Laurent Desbiens (FRA)	Cofidis	+ 2h 34' 01"
101	José Angel Vidal (ESP)	Kelme–Costa Blanca	+ 2h 34' 22"
102	Jaime Hernández (ESP)	Festina–Lotus	+ 2h 36' 04"
103	Davide Bramati (ITA)	Mapei–Quick-Step	+ 2h 36' 15"
104	Tom Steels (BEL)	Mapei–Quick-Step	+ 2h 36' 28"
105	Anthony Morin (FRA)	Française des Jeux	+ 2h 36' 37"
106	Frédérick Guesdon (FRA)	Française des Jeux	+ 2h 37' 27"
107	Erik Dekker (NED)	Rabobank	+ 2h 38' 05"
108	Fabien De Waele (BEL)	Lotto–Mobistar	+ 2h 39' 21"
109	Beat Zberg (SUI)	Rabobank	+ 2h 39' 29"
110	Kai Hundertmarck (GER)	Team Telekom	+ 2h 39' 32"
111	Ludovic Auger (FRA)	BigMat–Auber 93	+ 2h 39' 38"
112	Peter Wuyts (BEL)	Lotto–Mobistar	+ 2h 39' 50"
113	Marco Pinotti (ITA)	Lampre–Daikin	+ 2h 40' 00"
114	Silvio Martinello (ITA)	Team Polti	+ 2h 43' 14"
115	Christophe Capelle (FRA)	BigMat–Auber 93	+ 2h 45' 17"
116	Lars Michaelsen (DEN)	Française des Jeux	+ 2h 46' 20"
117	Claude Lamour (FRA)	Cofidis	+ 2h 46' 26"
118	Rolf Huser (SUI)	Festina–Lotus	+ 2h 47' 27"
119	Chris Boardman (GBR)	Crédit Agricole	+ 2h 47' 48"
120	Mirko Crepaldi (ITA)	Team Polti	+ 2h 49' 14"
121	Henk Vogels jr (AUS)	Crédit Agricole	+ 2h 49' 17"
122	Robbie McEwen (AUS)	Rabobank	+ 2h 49' 23"
123	Sébastien Hinault (FRA)	Crédit Agricole	+ 2h 51' 03"
124	Sergio Barbero (ITA)	Mercatone Uno–Bianchi	+ 2h 51' 09"
125	Gabriele Colombo (ITA)	Cantina Tollo–Alexia Alluminio	+ 2h 51' 43"
126	Carlos De La Cruz (FRA)	BigMat–Auber 93	+ 2h 51' 48"
127	Rossano Brasi (ITA)	Team Polti	+ 2h 52' 01"
128	Thierry Marichal (BEL)	Lotto–Mobistar	+ 2h 54' 06"
129	Juan José de los Ángeles (ESP)	Kelme–Costa Blanca	+ 2h 54' 40"
130	Sebastien Demarbaix (BEL)	Lotto–Mobistar	+ 2h 58' 32"
131	Marcus Ljungqvist (SWE)	Cantina Tollo–Alexia Alluminio	+ 3h 00' 09"
132	Anthony Langella (FRA)	Crédit Agricole	+ 3h 02' 20"
133	Bart Leysen (BEL)	Mapei–Quick-Step	+ 3h 03' 11"
134	Massimiliano Napolitano (ITA)	Mercatone Uno–Bianchi	+ 3h 05' 09"
135	Pedro Horrillo (ESP)	Vitalicio Seguros	+ 3h 05' 31"
136	Jan Schaffrath (GER)	Team Telekom	+ 3h 05' 41"
137	Luca Mazzanti (ITA)	Cantina Tollo–Alexia Alluminio	+ 3h 06' 28"
138	Alessandro Baronti (ITA)	Cantina Tollo–Alexia Alluminio	+ 3h 07' 07"
139	Thierry Loder (FRA)	Cofidis	+ 3h 11' 55"
140	Pascal Deramé (FRA)	U.S. Postal Service	+ 3h 14' 19"
141	Jacky Durand (FRA)	Lotto–Mobistar	+ 3h 19' 09"

=== Points classification ===
Final points classification (1–10)
Rank	Rider	Team	Points
1	Erik Zabel (GER)	Team Telekom	323
2	Stuart O'Grady (AUS)	Crédit Agricole	275
3	Christophe Capelle (FRA)	BigMat–Auber 93	196
4	Tom Steels (BEL)	Mapei–Quick-Step	188
5	François Simon (FRA)	Crédit Agricole	186
6	George Hincapie (USA)	U.S. Postal Service	166
7	Robbie McEwen (AUS)	Rabobank	166
8	Giampaolo Mondini (ITA)	Cantina Tollo–Alexia Alluminio	141
9	Christophe Moreau (FRA)	Festina–Lotus	140
10	Silvio Martinello (ITA)	Team Polti	130

=== Mountains classification ===
Final mountains classification (1–10)
Rank	Rider	Team	Points
1	Richard Virenque (FRA)	Team Polti	279
2	Alberto Elli (ITA)	Team Telekom	226
3	Mariano Piccoli (ITA)	Lampre–Daikin	205
4	Fernando Escartín (ESP)	Kelme–Costa Blanca	194
~~5~~	~~Lance Armstrong~~ (USA)	~~U.S. Postal Service~~	~~193~~
6	Alex Zülle (SUI)	Banesto	152
7	José Luis Arrieta (ESP)	Banesto	141
8	Laurent Dufaux (SUI)	Saeco–Cannondale	141
9	Andrea Peron (ITA)	ONCE–Deutsche Bank	138
10	Kurt Van De Wouwer (BEL)	Lotto–Mobistar	117

=== Young rider classification ===
Final young rider classification (1–10)
Rank	Rider	Team	Time
1	Benoit Salmon (FRA)	Casino–Ag2r Prévoyance	92h 01' 15"
2	Mario Aerts (BEL)	Lotto–Mobistar	+ 10' 22"
3	Francisco Tomas García (ESP)	Vitalicio Seguros	+ 16' 32"
4	Francisco Mancebo (ESP)	Banesto	+ 21' 32"
5	Luis Perez (ESP)	ONCE–Deutsche Bank	+ 23' 54"
6	Salvatore Commesso (ITA)	Saeco–Cannondale	+ 40' 16"
7	Steve De Wolf (BEL)	Cofidis	+ 42' 55"
8	José Javier Gomez (ESP)	Kelme–Costa Blanca	+ 1h 16' 51"
9	Rik Verbrugghe (BEL)	Lotto–Mobistar	+ 1h 35' 32"
10	Jörg Jaksche (GER)	Team Telekom	+ 1h 47' 45"

=== Team classification ===
Final team classification (1–10)
Rank	Team	Time
1	Banesto	275h 05' 21"
2	ONCE–Deutsche Bank	+ 8' 16"
3	Festina–Lotus	+ 16' 13"
4	Kelme–Costa Blanca	+ 23' 48"
5	Mapei–Quick-Step	+ 24' 13"
6	Team Telekom	+ 41' 00"
7	Vitalicio Seguros	+ 42' 44"
8	U.S. Postal Service	+ 57' 13"
9	Cofidis	+ 58' 02"
10	Lotto–Mobistar	+ 1h 09' 02"

=== Combativity classification ===
Final combativity classification (1–10)
Rank	Rider	Team	Points
1	Jacky Durand (FRA)	Lotto–Mobistar	61
2	Stéphane Heulot (FRA)	Française des Jeux	55
3	Thierry Gouvenou (FRA)	BigMat–Auber 93	51
4	Anthony Morin (FRA)	Française des Jeux	46
5	François Simon (FRA)	Crédit Agricole	42
6	Fernando Escartín (ESP)	Kelme–Costa Blanca	40
7	Lylian Lebreton (FRA)	BigMat–Auber 93	40
8	Frédéric Guesdon (FRA)	Française des Jeux	40
9	Alberto Elli (ITA)	Team Telekom	39
10	Mariano Piccoli (ITA)	Lampre–Daikin	36

== Bibliography ==
- Augendre, Jacques (2016). "Guide historique" [Historical guide] (PDF). Tour de France (in French). Paris: Amaury Sport Organisation. Archived (PDF) from the original on 17 August 2016.
- Nauright, John; Parrish, Charles (2012). Sports Around the World: History, Culture, and Practice. Vol. 2. Santa Barbara, California: ABC-CLIO. ISBN 978-1-59884-300-2.
- "Race regulations" (PDF). Tour de France. Paris: Amaury Sport Organisation. 1999. Archived from the original (PDF) on 13 July 2003.
- van den Akker, Pieter (2018). Tour de France Rules and Statistics: 1903–2018. Self-published. ISBN 978-1-79398-080-9.
