= 1999 Tour de France, Prologue to Stage 10 =

Stages of cycle race

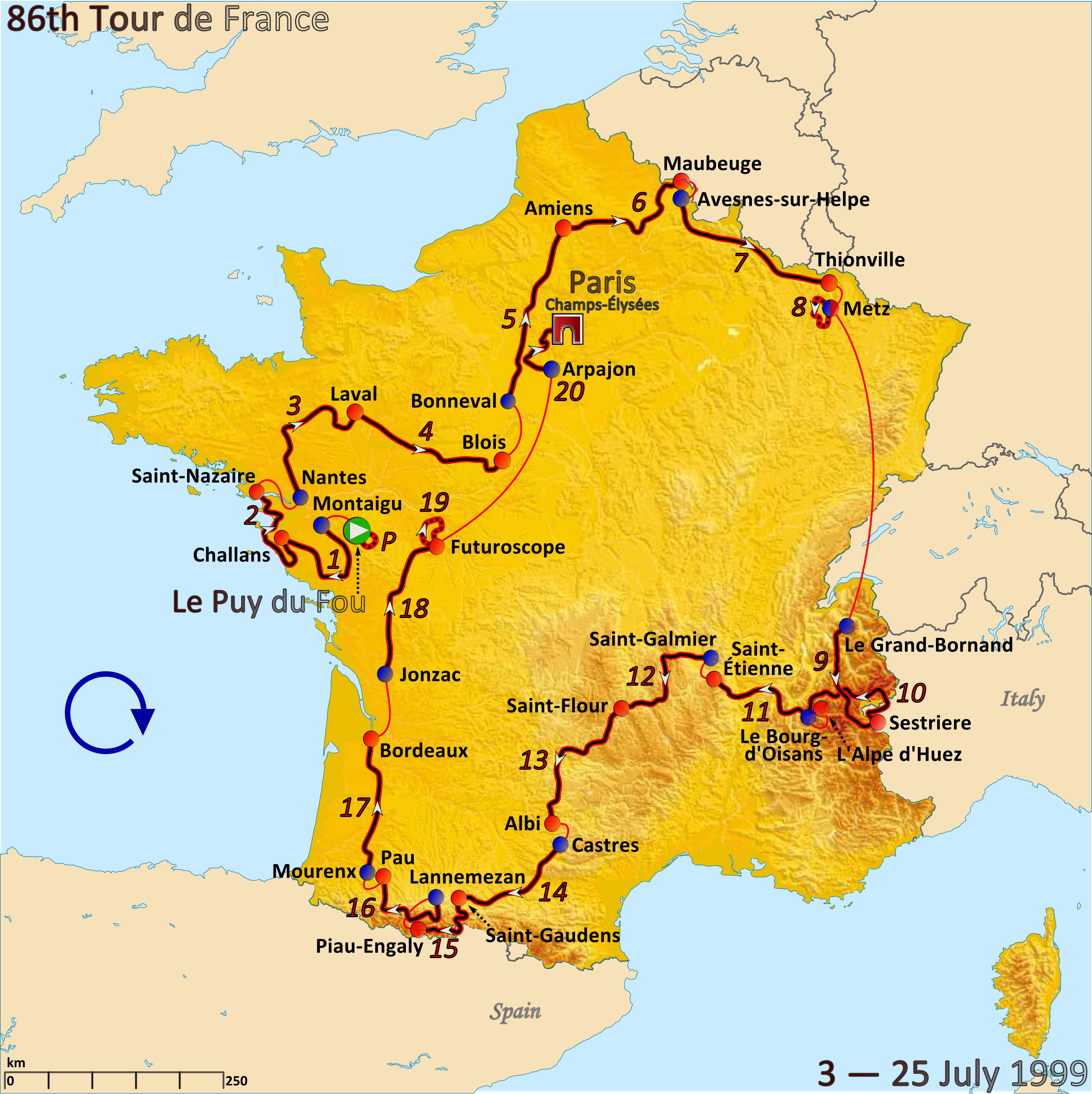
Route of the 1999 Tour de France

The 1999 Tour de France was the 86th edition of Tour de France, one of cycling's Grand Tours. The Tour began in Le Puy du Fou with a prologue individual time trial on 3 July and Stage 10 occurred on 14 July with a mountainous stage to Alpe d'Huez. The race finished on the Champs-Élysées in Paris on 25 July.

== Prologue ==
3 July 1999 — Le Puy du Fou, 6.8 km (4.2 mi) (individual time trial)

Prologue result and general classification after prologue

Rank	Cyclist	Team	Time
~~1~~	~~Lance Armstrong (USA)~~	~~U.S. Postal Service~~	~~8' 02"~~
2	Alex Zülle (SUI)	Banesto	+ 7"
3	Abraham Olano (ESP)	ONCE–Deutsche Bank	+ 11"
4	Christophe Moreau (FRA)	Festina–Lotus	+ 15"
5	Chris Boardman (GBR)	Crédit Agricole	+ 16"
6	Rik Verbrugghe (BEL)	Lotto–Mobistar	+ 18"
7	Alexander Vinokourov (KAZ)	Casino–Ag2r Prévoyance	+ 21"
8	Santos González (ESP)	ONCE–Deutsche Bank	+ 21"
9	Laurent Brochard (FRA)	Festina–Lotus	s.t.
10	Gilles Maignan (FRA)	Casino–Ag2r Prévoyance	+ 23"

== Stage 1 ==
4 July 1999 — Montaigu to Challans, 208 km (129.2 mi)

Stage 1 result

Rank	Cyclist	Team	Time
1	Jaan Kirsipuu (EST)	Casino–Ag2r Prévoyance	4:56:18"
2	Tom Steels (BEL)	Mapei–Quick-Step	s.t.
3	Erik Zabel (GER)	Team Telekom	s.t.
4	Stuart O'Grady (AUS)	Crédit Agricole	s.t.
5	Silvio Martinello (ITA)	Team Polti	s.t.
6	Jimmy Casper (FRA)	Française des Jeux	s.t.
7	Nicola Minali (ITA)	Cantina Tollo–Alexia Alluminio	s.t.
8	George Hincapie (USA)	U.S. Postal Service	s.t.
9	François Simon (FRA)	Crédit Agricole	s.t.
10	Christophe Moreau (FRA)	Festina–Lotus	s.t.

General classification after stage 1

Rank	Cyclist	Team	Time
~~1~~	~~Lance Armstrong (USA)~~	~~U.S. Postal Service~~	~~5:04:20"~~
2	Alex Zülle (SUI)	Banesto	+ 7"
3	Abraham Olano (ESP)	ONCE–Deutsche Bank	+ 11"
4	Christophe Moreau (FRA)	Festina–Lotus	+ 15"
5	Chris Boardman (GBR)	Crédit Agricole	+ 16"
6	Jaan Kirsipuu (EST)	Casino–Ag2r Prévoyance	s.t.
7	Rik Verbrugghe (BEL)	Lotto–Mobistar	+ 18"
8	Stuart O'Grady (AUS)	Crédit Agricole	+ 20"
9	Alexander Vinokourov (KAZ)	Casino–Ag2r Prévoyance	+ 21"
10	Santos González (ESP)	ONCE–Deutsche Bank	s.t.

== Stage 2 ==
5 July 1999 — Challans to Saint-Nazaire, 176 km (109.4 mi)

Stage 2 result

Rank	Cyclist	Team	Time
1	Tom Steels (BEL)	Mapei–Quick-Step	3:45:32"
2	Jaan Kirsipuu (EST)	Casino–Ag2r Prévoyance	s.t.
3	Mario Cipollini (ITA)	Saeco–Cannondale	s.t.
4	Erik Zabel (GER)	Team Telekom	s.t.
5	Jimmy Casper (FRA)	Française des Jeux	s.t.
6	George Hincapie (USA)	U.S. Postal Service	s.t.
7	Ján Svorada (CZE)	Lampre–Daikin	s.t.
8	Silvio Martinello (ITA)	Team Polti	s.t.
9	Stuart O'Grady (AUS)	Crédit Agricole	s.t.
10	François Simon (FRA)	Crédit Agricole	s.t.

General classification after stage 2

Rank	Cyclist	Team	Time
1	Jaan Kirsipuu (EST)	Casino–Ag2r Prévoyance	8:49:38"
~~2~~	~~Lance Armstrong (USA)~~	~~U.S. Postal Service~~	~~+ 14"~~
3	Stuart O'Grady (AUS)	Crédit Agricole	+ 22"
4	Abraham Olano (ESP)	ONCE–Deutsche Bank	+ 25"
5	Christophe Moreau (FRA)	Festina–Lotus	+ 29"
6	Tom Steels (BEL)	Mapei–Quick-Step	+ 31"
7	George Hincapie (USA)	U.S. Postal Service	+ 32"
8	Alexander Vinokourov (KAZ)	Casino–Ag2r Prévoyance	+ 35"
9	Santos González (ESP)	ONCE–Deutsche Bank	+ 35"
10	Andrea Peron (ITA)	ONCE–Deutsche Bank	+ 37"

== Stage 3 ==
6 July 1999 — Nantes to Laval, 194.5 km (120.9 mi)

Stage 3 result

Rank	Cyclist	Team	Time
1	Tom Steels (BEL)	Mapei–Quick-Step	4:29:27"
2	Erik Zabel (GER)	Team Telekom	s.t.
3	Stuart O'Grady (AUS)	Crédit Agricole	s.t.
4	Nicola Minali (ITA)	Cantina Tollo–Alexia Alluminio	s.t.
5	George Hincapie (USA)	U.S. Postal Service	s.t.
6	Jimmy Casper (FRA)	Française des Jeux	s.t.
7	Robbie McEwen (AUS)	Rabobank	s.t.
8	Silvio Martinello (ITA)	Team Polti	s.t.
9	Elio Aggiano (ITA)	Vitalicio Seguros	s.t.
10	Mario Cipollini (ITA)	Saeco–Cannondale	s.t.

General classification after stage 3

Rank	Cyclist	Team	Time
1	Jaan Kirsipuu (EST)	Casino–Ag2r Prévoyance	13:18:59"
2	Tom Steels (BEL)	Mapei–Quick-Step	+ 17"
3	Stuart O'Grady (AUS)	Crédit Agricole	+ 20"
~~4~~	~~Lance Armstrong (USA)~~	~~U.S. Postal Service~~	~~s.t.~~
5	Abraham Olano (ESP)	ONCE–Deutsche Bank	+ 31"
6	George Hincapie (USA)	U.S. Postal Service	+ 34"
7	Christophe Moreau (FRA)	Festina–Lotus	+ 35"
8	Erik Zabel (GER)	Team Telekom	+ 40"
9	Alexander Vinokourov (KAZ)	Casino–Ag2r Prévoyance	+ 41"
10	Santos González (ESP)	ONCE–Deutsche Bank	s.t.

== Stage 4 ==
7 July 1999 — Laval to Blois, 194.5 km (120.9 mi)

Stage 4 set a record for the fastest ever massed-start stage on the Tour de France which stood until 2026, with the stage won by Mario Cipollini at an average of 50.4 km/h (31.3 mph) with the help of a tailwind.

Stage 4 result

Rank	Cyclist	Team	Time
1	Mario Cipollini (ITA)	Saeco–Cannondale	3:51:45"
2	Erik Zabel (GER)	Team Telekom	s.t.
3	Stuart O'Grady (AUS)	Crédit Agricole	s.t.
4	Tom Steels (BEL)	Mapei–Quick-Step	s.t.
5	Jaan Kirsipuu (EST)	Casino–Ag2r Prévoyance	s.t.
6	Nicola Minali (ITA)	Cantina Tollo–Alexia Alluminio	s.t.
7	Christophe Capelle (FRA)	BigMat–Auber 93	s.t.
8	Damien Nazon (FRA)	Française des Jeux	s.t.
9	George Hincapie (USA)	U.S. Postal Service	s.t.
10	Jay Sweet (AUS)	BigMat–Auber 93	s.t.

General classification after stage 4

Rank	Cyclist	Team	Time
1	Jaan Kirsipuu (EST)	Casino–Ag2r Prévoyance	17:10:40"
2	Stuart O'Grady (AUS)	Crédit Agricole	+ 16"
3	Tom Steels (BEL)	Mapei–Quick-Step	+ 21"
~~4~~	~~Lance Armstrong (USA)~~	~~U.S. Postal Service~~	~~+ 24"~~
5	Erik Zabel (GER)	Team Telekom	+ 32"
6	Abraham Olano (ESP)	ONCE–Deutsche Bank	+ 35"
7	George Hincapie (USA)	U.S. Postal Service	+ 38"
8	Christophe Moreau (FRA)	Festina–Lotus	+ 39"
9	Mario Cipollini (ITA)	Saeco–Cannondale	+ 44"
10	Alexander Vinokourov (KAZ)	Casino–Ag2r Prévoyance	+ 45"

== Stage 5 ==
8 July 1999 — Bonneval to Amiens, 233.5 km (145.1 mi)

Stage 5 result

Rank	Cyclist	Team	Time
1	Mario Cipollini (ITA)	Saeco–Cannondale	5h 36' 28"
2	Tom Steels (BEL)	Mapei–Quick-Step	s.t.
3	Jaan Kirsipuu (EST)	Casino–Ag2r Prévoyance	s.t.
4	Robbie McEwen (AUS)	Rabobank	s.t.
5	Erik Zabel (GER)	Team Telekom	s.t.
6	Stuart O'Grady (AUS)	Crédit Agricole	s.t.
7	Nicola Minali (ITA)	Cantina Tollo–Alexia Alluminio	s.t.
8	Christophe Capelle (FRA)	BigMat–Auber 93	s.t.
9	Damien Nazon (FRA)	Française des Jeux	s.t.
10	Ján Svorada (CZE)	Lampre–Daikin	s.t.

General classification after stage 5

Rank	Cyclist	Team	Time
1	Jaan Kirsipuu (EST)	Casino–Ag2r Prévoyance	22:47:00"
2	Tom Steels (BEL)	Mapei–Quick-Step	+ 17"
3	Stuart O'Grady (AUS)	Crédit Agricole	+ 24"
~~4~~	~~Lance Armstrong (USA)~~	~~U.S. Postal Service~~	~~+ 32"~~
5	Mario Cipollini (ITA)	Saeco–Cannondale	s.t.
6	Erik Zabel (GER)	Team Telekom	+ 40"
7	Abraham Olano (ESP)	ONCE–Deutsche Bank	+ 43"
8	George Hincapie (USA)	U.S. Postal Service	+ 46"
9	Christophe Moreau (FRA)	Festina–Lotus	+ 47"
10	Alexander Vinokourov (KAZ)	Casino–Ag2r Prévoyance	+ 53"

== Stage 6 ==
9 July 1999 — Amiens to Maubeuge, 171.5 km (106.6 mi)

Stage 6 result

Rank	Rider	Team	Time
1	Mario Cipollini (ITA)	Saeco–Cannondale	4h 11' 09"
2	Erik Zabel (GER)	Team Telekom	s.t.
3	Jaan Kirsipuu (EST)	Casino–Ag2r Prévoyance	s.t.
4	Ján Svorada (CZE)	Lampre–Daikin	s.t.
5	Damien Nazon (FRA)	Française des Jeux	s.t.
6	George Hincapie (USA)	U.S. Postal Service	s.t.
7	Silvio Martinello (ITA)	Team Polti	s.t.
8	Stuart O'Grady (AUS)	Crédit Agricole	s.t.
9	Nicola Minali (ITA)	Cantina Tollo–Alexia Alluminio	s.t.
10	Lars Michaelsen (DEN)	Française des Jeux	s.t.

General classification after stage 6

Rank	Rider	Team	Time
1	Jaan Kirsipuu (EST)	Casino–Ag2r Prévoyance	26h 57' 55"
2	Mario Cipollini (ITA)	Saeco–Cannondale	+ 26"
3	Tom Steels (BEL)	Mapei–Quick-Step	+ 31"
4	Stuart O'Grady (AUS)	Crédit Agricole	+ 38"
5	Erik Zabel (GER)	Team Telekom	s.t.
~~6~~	~~Lance Armstrong (USA)~~	~~U.S. Postal Service~~	~~+ 46"~~
7	Abraham Olano (ESP)	ONCE–Deutsche Bank	+ 57"
8	George Hincapie (USA)	U.S. Postal Service	+ 58"
9	Christophe Moreau (FRA)	Festina–Lotus	+ 1' 01"
10	François Simon (FRA)	Crédit Agricole	+ 1' 04"

== Stage 7 ==
10 July 1999 — Avesnes-sur-Helpe to Thionville, 227.0 km (141.1 mi)

Stage 7 result

Rank	Rider	Team	Time
1	Mario Cipollini (ITA)	Saeco–Cannondale	5h 26' 59"
2	Stuart O'Grady (AUS)	Crédit Agricole	s.t.
3	Jaan Kirsipuu (EST)	Casino–Ag2r Prévoyance	s.t.
4	Henk Vogels (AUS)	Crédit Agricole	s.t.
5	Ján Svorada (CZE)	Lampre–Daikin	s.t.
6	Damien Nazon (FRA)	Française des Jeux	s.t.
7	Christophe Capelle (FRA)	BigMat–Auber 93	s.t.
8	Jimmy Casper (FRA)	Française des Jeux	s.t.
9	George Hincapie (USA)	U.S. Postal Service	s.t.
10	François Simon (FRA)	Crédit Agricole	s.t.

General classification after stage 7

Rank	Rider	Team	Time
1	Jaan Kirsipuu (EST)	Casino–Ag2r Prévoyance	32h 24' 46"
2	Mario Cipollini (ITA)	Saeco–Cannondale	+ 14"
3	Stuart O'Grady (AUS)	Crédit Agricole	+ 34"
4	Erik Zabel (GER)	Team Telekom	+ 44"
~~5~~	~~Lance Armstrong (USA)~~	~~U.S. Postal Service~~	~~+ 54"~~
6	Abraham Olano (ESP)	ONCE–Deutsche Bank	+ 1' 05"
7	George Hincapie (USA)	U.S. Postal Service	+ 1' 06"
8	Tom Steels (BEL)	Mapei–Quick-Step	+ 1' 09"
9	Christophe Moreau (FRA)	Festina–Lotus	s.t.
10	François Simon (FRA)	Crédit Agricole	+ 1' 12"

== Stage 8 ==
11 July 1999 — Metz, 56.5 km (35.1 mi) (individual time trial)

Stage 8 result

Rank	Cyclist	Team	Time
~~1~~	~~Lance Armstrong (USA)~~	~~U.S. Postal Service~~	~~1:08:36"~~
2	Alex Zülle (SUI)	Banesto	+ 57"
3	Christophe Moreau (FRA)	Festina–Lotus	+ 2' 04"
4	Abraham Olano (ESP)	ONCE–Deutsche Bank	+ 2' 21"
5	Tyler Hamilton (USA)	U.S. Postal Service	+ 3' 30"
6	Chris Boardman (GBR)	Crédit Agricole	+ 3' 31"
7	Álvaro González de Galdeano (ESP)	Vitalicio Seguros	+ 3' 40"
8	Jens Voigt (GER)	Crédit Agricole	+ 3' 41"
9	Stuart O'Grady (AUS)	Crédit Agricole	+ 3' 45"
10	Laurent Dufaux (SUI)	Saeco–Cannondale	+ 3' 55"

General classification after stage 8

Rank	Cyclist	Team	Time
~~1~~	~~Lance Armstrong (USA)~~	~~U.S. Postal Service~~	~~33:34:16"~~
2	Christophe Moreau (FRA)	Festina–Lotus	+ 2' 20"
3	Abraham Olano (ESP)	ONCE–Deutsche Bank	+ 2' 33"
4	Stuart O'Grady (AUS)	Crédit Agricole	+ 3' 25"
5	Álvaro González de Galdeano (ESP)	Vitalicio Seguros	+ 4' 10"
6	Jens Voigt (GER)	Crédit Agricole	s.t.
7	Laurent Dufaux (SUI)	Saeco–Cannondale	+ 4' 19"
8	Andrea Peron (ITA)	ONCE–Deutsche Bank	+ 4' 22"
9	Santos González (ESP)	ONCE–Deutsche Bank	+ 4' 37"
10	Daniele Nardello (ITA)	Mapei–Quick-Step	+ 4' 46"

== Stage 9 ==
13 July 1999 — Le Grand-Bornand to Sestrières, 213.5 km (132.7 mi)

Stage 9 result

Rank	Cyclist	Team	Time
~~1~~	~~Lance Armstrong (USA)~~	~~U.S. Postal Service~~	~~5:57:11"~~
2	Alex Zülle (SUI)	Banesto	+ 31"
3	Fernando Escartín (ESP)	Kelme–Costa Blanca	+ 1' 26"
4	Ivan Gotti (ITA)	Team Polti	s.t.
5	Manuel Beltrán (ESP)	Banesto	+ 2' 27"
6	Richard Virenque (FRA)	Team Polti	s.t.
7	Carlos Contreras (COL)	Kelme–Costa Blanca	+ 2' 29"
8	Kurt Van De Wouwer (BEL)	Lotto–Mobistar	+ 3' 10"
9	Abraham Olano (ESP)	ONCE–Deutsche Bank	s.t.
10	Laurent Dufaux (SUI)	Saeco–Cannondale	+ 3' 30"

General classification after stage 9

Rank	Cyclist	Team	Time
~~1~~	~~Lance Armstrong (USA)~~	~~U.S. Postal Service~~	~~39:31:07"~~
2	Abraham Olano (ESP)	ONCE–Deutsche Bank	+ 6' 03"
3	Christophe Moreau (FRA)	Festina–Lotus	+ 7' 44"
4	Alex Zülle (SUI)	Banesto	+ 7' 47"
5	Laurent Dufaux (SUI)	Saeco–Cannondale	+ 8' 07"
6	Daniele Nardello (ITA)	Mapei–Quick-Step	+ 8' 39"
7	Ángel Casero (ESP)	Vitalicio Seguros	+ 8' 54"
8	Fernando Escartín (ESP)	Kelme–Costa Blanca	+ 9' 01"
9	Richard Virenque (FRA)	Team Polti	+ 10' 02"
10	Pavel Tonkov (RUS)	Mapei–Quick-Step	+ 10' 34"

== Stage 10 ==
14 July 1999 — Sestrières to Alpe d'Huez, 220.5 km (137.0 mi)

Stage 10 result

Rank	Cyclist	Team	Time
1	Giuseppe Guerini (ITA)	Team Telekom	6:42:31"
2	Pavel Tonkov (RUS)	Mapei–Quick-Step	+ 21"
3	Fernando Escartín (ESP)	Kelme–Costa Blanca	+ 25"
4	Alex Zülle (SUI)	Banesto	s.t.
~~5~~	~~Lance Armstrong (USA)~~	~~U.S. Postal Service~~	~~s.t.~~
6	Richard Virenque (FRA)	Team Polti	s.t.
7	Laurent Dufaux (SUI)	Saeco–Cannondale	s.t.
8	Kurt Van De Wouwer (BEL)	Lotto–Mobistar	s.t.
9	Manuel Beltrán (ESP)	Banesto	+ 32"
10	Carlos Contreras (COL)	Kelme–Costa Blanca	+ 49"

General classification after stage 10

Rank	Cyclist	Team	Time
~~1~~	~~Lance Armstrong (USA)~~	~~U.S. Postal Service~~	~~46:14:03"~~
2	Abraham Olano (ESP)	ONCE–Deutsche Bank	+ 7' 42"
3	Alex Zülle (SUI)	Banesto	+ 7' 47"
4	Laurent Dufaux (SUI)	Saeco–Cannondale	+ 8' 07"
5	Fernando Escartín (ESP)	Kelme–Costa Blanca	+ 8' 53"
6	Richard Virenque (FRA)	Team Polti	+ 10' 02"
7	Pavel Tonkov (RUS)	Mapei–Quick-Step	+ 10' 18"
8	Daniele Nardello (ITA)	Mapei–Quick-Step	+ 10' 56"
9	Giuseppe Guerini (ITA)	Team Telekom	+ 10' 57"
10	Ángel Casero (ESP)	Vitalicio Seguros	+ 11' 11"
