= Arrizabalaga =

Arrizabalaga is a Basque surname. Notable people with the surname include:

- Ainhoa Larrañaga (born 2000), Spanish actress and singer
- Gorka Arrizabalaga (born 1977), Spanish cyclist
- Kepa Arrizabalaga (born 1994), Spanish football player
- Raul Fernández Arrizabalaga (born 1972), Spanish cyclist and judoka
