= Benoît Salmon =

French cyclist

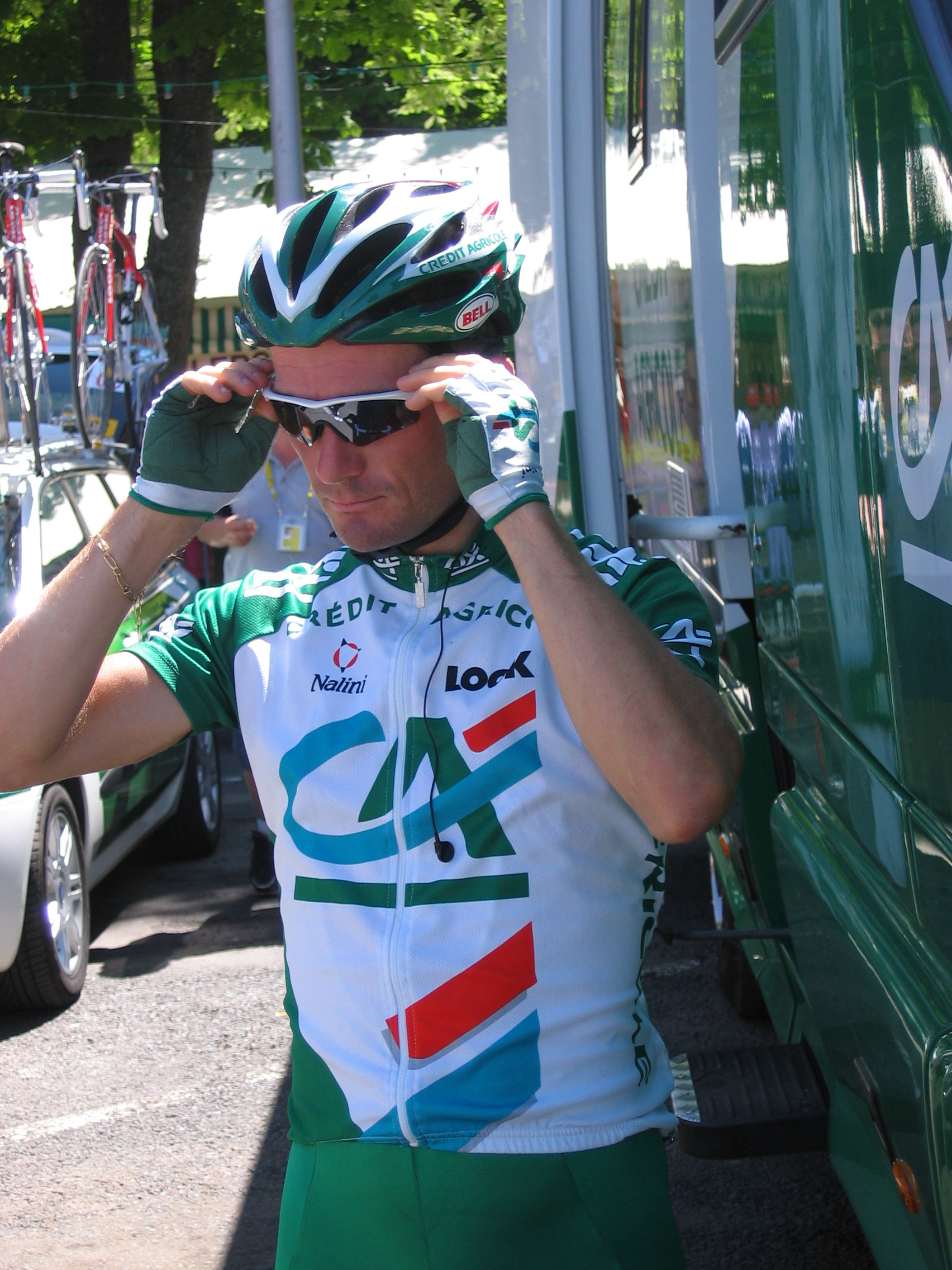
- Salmon during the 2004 Tour de France

Personal information
- Born: 9 May 1974 (age 52) Dinan, France
- Height: 1.69 m (5 ft 7 in)
- Weight: 60 kg (132 lb)

Cycling career
- Sport: Cycling
- Current team: Retired
- Discipline: Road
- Role: Rider

Amateur teams
- 1986: CC Plancoët
- 1993–1994: CC Louison Bobet
- 1994: Castorama (stagiaire)

Professional teams
- 1995: Castorama
- 1996: Collstrop–Lystex
- 1997: Lotto–Mobistar–Isoglass
- 1998–2001: Casino–Ag2r
- 2002–2003: Phonak
- 2004: Crédit Agricole
- 2005–2008: Agritubel–Loudun

Benoît Salmon (born 9 May 1974 is a French former professional road racing cyclist. In 1999, Salmon won the young rider classification in the Tour de France and the overall title of the Grand Prix du Midi Libre.

== Major results ==
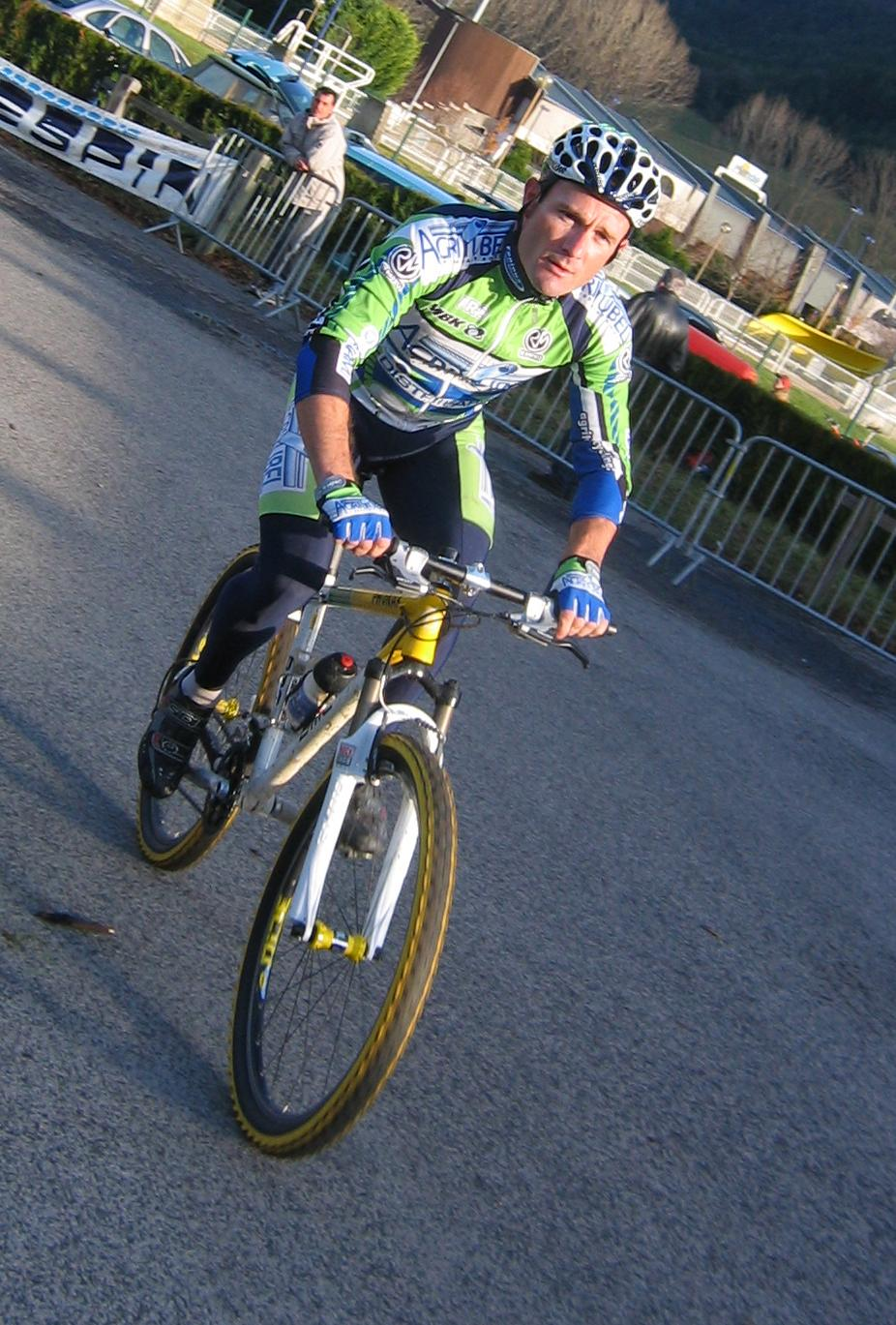
In November 2006 during the third cyclo-cross of Mende

1992
1st Road race, National Junior Road Championships
1996
1st Flèche Ardennaise
8th Overall Tour de l'Avenir
1997
5th GP de Cholet-Pays de Loire
8th Route Adélie
9th La Flèche Wallonne
1998
1st Overall Tour du Vaucluse

1st Stage 4

3rd Classique des Alpes
6th Overall Grand Prix du Midi Libre
1999
1st Overall Grand Prix du Midi Libre

1st Stage 4

1st Young rider classification, Tour de France
2nd Classique des Alpes
6th Tour du Haut Var
2000
6th Paris–Camembert
6th Classique des Alpes
2001
2nd Overall Grand Prix du Midi Libre

1st Stage 6

2nd Tour de Vendée
3rd Overall Critérium du Dauphiné Libéré
5th Classique des Alpes
8th GP Ouest-France
8th Trophée des Grimpeurs
2003
2nd Classique des Alpes
4th Road race, National Road Championships
2004
3rd Road race, National Road Championships
10th Overall Route du Sud
2005
3rd Overall Route du Sud
6th Overall Tour de l'Ain
9th Tour du Doubs
2006
4th Grand Prix de Wallonie
7th Trofeo Melinda
9th Overall Rhône-Alpes Isère Tour

=== Grand Tour general classification results timeline ===
Grand Tour	1997	1998	1999	2000	2001	2002	2003	2004	2005	2006	2007
Giro d'Italia	—	—	—	—	—	—	—	—	—	—	—
Tour de France	DNF	28	16	107	35	—	—	83	—	38	125
Vuelta a España	—	—	—	—	—	83	—	—	—	—	—

Legend
—	Did not compete
DNF	Did not finish
