= 1998 Paris–Nice =

Race details
- Dates: 8–15 March 1998
- Stages: 8
- Distance: 1,295 km (804.7 mi)
- Winning time: 31h 45' 03"

Results
Jersey awarded to the overall winner	Winner	Frank Vandenbroucke (BEL)	(Mapei–Bricobi)
	Second	Laurent Jalabert (FRA)	(ONCE)
	Third	Marcelino García (ESP)	(ONCE)

The 1998 Paris–Nice was the 56th edition of the Paris–Nice cycle race and was held from 8 March to 15 March 1998. The race started in Suresnes and finished in Nice. The race was won by Frank Vandenbroucke of the Mapei team.

The race saw the professional comeback of Lance Armstrong after receiving treatment for testicular cancer. He finished 23rd in the prologue, but pulled out the next day, with his return to racing in jeopardy. He would later win seven consecutive Tour de France titles, only to be stripped of all results following a lengthy investigation into his doping practices.

== Teams ==
Eighteen teams, containing a total of 144 riders, participated in the race:

- ONCE
- Saeco–Cannondale
- Festina–Lotus
- U.S. Postal Service
- Mapei–Bricobi
- Casino–Ag2r
- GAN
- Rabobank
- Team Telekom
- Team Polti
- Française des Jeux
- Cofidis
- Banesto
- Lotto–Mobistar
- Kelme–Costa Blanca
- Riso Scotti–MG Maglificio
- BigMat–Auber 93
- Mutuelle de Seine-et-Marne

== Route ==
Stage characteristics and winners
Stage	Date	Course	Distance	Type	Winner
1	8 March	Suresnes to Paris	10.2 km (6.3 mi)	Individual time trial	Frank Vandenbroucke (BEL)
2	9 March	Montereau to Sens	170.2 km (105.8 mi)		David Etxebarria (ESP)
3	10 March	Sens to Nevers	195.8 km (121.7 mi)		Tom Steels (BEL)
4	11 March	Nevers to Vichy	194.5 km (120.9 mi)		Tom Steels (BEL)
5	12 March	Cusset to Col de la République	113 km (70 mi) (Note: Stage shortened from 151.5 km (94.1 mi) due to snow.)		Frank Vandenbroucke (BEL)
6	13 March	Montélimar to Sisteron	189 km (117 mi)		Andrei Tchmil (BEL)
7	14 March	Sisteron to Cannes	223 km (139 mi)		Andrei Tchmil (BEL)
8	15 March	Nice to Nice	161.4 km (100.3 mi)		Christophe Capelle (FRA)

== General classification ==
Final general classification

Rank	Rider	Team	Time
1	Frank Vandenbroucke (BEL)	Mapei–Bricobi	31h 45' 03"
2	Laurent Jalabert (FRA)	ONCE	+ 40"
3	Marcelino García (ESP)	ONCE	+ 48"
4	Alex Zülle (SUI)	Festina–Lotus	+ 59"
5	Rodolfo Massi (ITA)	Casino–Ag2r	+ 1' 11"
6	Christophe Moreau (FRA)	Festina–Lotus	+ 1' 14"
7	Mikel Zarrabeitia (ESP)	ONCE	+ 1' 25"
8	Laurent Dufaux (SUI)	Festina–Lotus	+ 1' 29"
9	Peter Luttenberger (AUT)	Rabobank	+ 1' 29"
10	Roberto Heras (ESP)	Kelme–Costa Blanca	+ 1' 45"
