= Gianpaolo Mondini =

Italian cyclist

Personal information
- Full name: Gianpaolo Mondini
- Born: 15 July 1972 (age 54) Faenza, Italy

Cycling career
- Sport: Cycling
- Discipline: Road
- Role: Rider

Professional teams
- 1996–1997: Amore & Vita–ForzArcore
- 1998: Kross–Selle Italia
- 1999–2000: Cantina Tollo–Alexia Alluminio
- 2001: Mercatone Uno–Stream TV
- 2002: U.S. Postal Service
- 2003: Domina Vacanze–Elitron

Major wins
- Grand Tours Tour de France 1 individual stage (1999) Single-day races and Classics National Time Trial Championships (2003)

Gianpaolo Mondini (born 15 July 1972 in Faenza) is an Italian former road bicycle racer. He won the 18th stage in the 1999 Tour de France and the 2003 Italian National Time Trial Championship.

== Doping ==
In 2002 Mondini was sacked from US Postal after police found EPO and growth hormones in his hotel room during 2001 Giro d'Italia. He admitted using illegal substances.

== Major results ==
1996
1st Stage 7 Tour de Pologne
2nd Overall Hofbrau Cup
1997
1st Overall Tour of Sweden

1st Stage 1

1st Stage 5 Circuit de Lorraine
10th Giro dell'Emilia
1998
1st GP Industria Artigianato e Commercio Carnaghese
3rd Giro d'Oro
1999
1st Stage 18 Tour de France
1st Stage 1 Tour de Pologne
1st Stage 5 Tour of Japan
8th LuK Challenge
2000
1st Omloop van de Vlaamse Scheldeboorden
8th E3 Prijs Vlaanderen
2003
1st Time trial, National Road Championships
9th Firenze–Pistoia

=== Grand Tour general classification results timeline ===
Grand Tour	1997	1998	1999	2000	2001	2002	2003
Giro d'Italia	67	—	—	109	74	—	DNF
Tour de France	—	—	81	—	—	—	—
Vuelta a España	—	—	—	—	—	—	131

Legend
—	Did not compete
DNF	Did not finish

== See also ==
- List of doping cases in cycling
