= Thierry Loder =

Swiss-French cyclist

Personal information
- Born: 15 December 1975 (age 50) Geneva, Switzerland

Cycling career
- Sport: Cycling
- Current team: Retired
- Discipline: Road
- Role: Rider

Amateur team
- 1998: Cofidis (stagiaire)

Professional teams
- 1999–2000: Cofidis
- 2001–2003: AG2R Prévoyance

Thierry Loder (born 15 December 1975 in Geneva) is a Swiss-born French former cyclist.

== Major results ==
1995
1st Tour du Lac Léman
1998
3rd Overall Tour de l'Avenir
2000
2nd Overall Tour de l'Ain
9th Overall Tour de l'Avenir
2001
5th Overall Giro della Provincia di Lucca
2004
2nd Overall Tour des Pyrénées

1st Points classification

10th Tour du Lac Léman

=== Grand Tour general classification results timeline ===
Grand Tour	1999	2000	2001	2002
Giro d'Italia	—	—	—	—
Tour de France	139	—	—	98
Vuelta a España	—	—	—	DNF
