= Francisco Tomás García =

Spanish cyclist

Personal information
- Full name: Francisco Tomás García Rodríguez
- Born: 5 November 1975 (age 50) Madrid, Spain

Cycling career
- Sport: Cycling
- Current team: Retired
- Discipline: Road
- Role: Rider

Professional teams
- 1998–2000: Vitalicio Seguros
- 2001: ONCE–Eroski
- 2002: Acqua & Sapone–Cantina Tollo
- 2003: Antarte–Rota dos Móveis
- 2004: Cafés Baqué
- 2005–2006: Paredes Rota dos Móveis–Beira Tâmega

Francisco Tomás García Rodríguez (born 5 November 1975) is a Spanish former professional cyclist.

== Major results ==
1997
1st Stage 5 Troféu Joaquim Agostinho
2nd Circuito Montañés
1999
1st Stage 4 Clásico RCN
2005
1st Gran Premio Área Metropolitana de Vigo

=== Grand Tour general classification results timeline ===
Grand Tour	1998	1999	2000	2001	2002	2003	2004
Giro d'Italia	—	—	—	DNF	—	—	—
Tour de France	DNF	26	—	—	—	—	—
Vuelta a España	—	—	18	—	—	—	41

Legend
—	Did not compete
DNF	Did not finish
