= Lylian Lebreton =

French cyclist

Personal information
- Born: 6 January 1972 (age 54) Nantes, France

Cycling career
- Sport: Cycling
- Discipline: Road
- Role: Rider

Professional teams
- 1994–1995: Aubervilliers 93–Peugeot
- 1996–1997: Festina–Lotus
- 1998–2002: BigMat–Auber 93

Lylian Lebreton (born 6 January 1972) is a French former cyclist.

== Career achievements ==
=== Major results ===
1992
1st Trois jours de Cherbourg
1994
1st Tour de l'Ain

1st stage 1

3rd Tour du Limousin
1995
3rd Tour du Vaucluse
1997
1st stage 11 Vuelta Ciclista de Chile
3rd Polymultipliée Lyonnaise
3rd Tour de l'Avenir
2001
2nd Mi-Août Bretonne

=== Grand Tour general classification results timeline ===
Grand Tour	1996	1997	1998	1999
Giro d'Italia	DNF	68	—	—
Tour de France	—	—	41	51
Vuelta a España	DNF	—	—	—
