= José Javier Gómez =

Spanish cyclist

Personal information
- Born: 18 March 1974 (age 52) Cuéllar, Spain

Cycling career
- Sport: Cycling
- Current team: Retired
- Discipline: Road
- Role: Rider

Professional teams
- 1996–2001: Kelme–Artiach
- 2002: Labarca-2–Café Baqué

José Javier Gómez (born 18 March 1974) is a Spanish racing cyclist. He rode in three editions of the Tour de France, two editions of the Giro d'Italia, and to editions of the Vuelta a España.

== Major results ==
1997
10th Clásica de Almería
2000
4th Overall Tour du Limousin
6th Overall Route du Sud
2001
6th Subida al Naranco
6th Subida a Urkiola
2004
5th Overall Vuelta a Asturias
2007
5th Overall Clásica Internacional de Alcobendas

=== Grand Tour general classification results timeline ===
Grand Tour	1997	1998	1999	2000	2001	2002	2003
Giro d'Italia	22	—	—	30	—	—	—
Tour de France	—	DNF	59	—	—	DNF	—
Vuelta a España	—	—	—	—	26	—	DNF

Legend
—	Did not compete
DNF	Did not finish
