= David Etxebarria =

Spanish cyclist

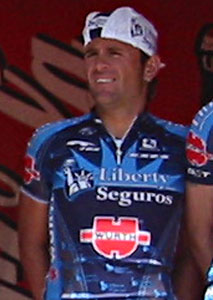
- Etxebarria in 2005

Personal information
- Full name: David Etxebarria Alkorta
- Born: 23 July 1973 (age 53) Abadiño, Spain
- Height: 1.64 m (5 ft 5 in)
- Weight: 55 kg (121 lb)

Cycling career
- Sport: Cycling
- Current team: Retired
- Discipline: Road
- Role: Rider

Professional teams
- 1994–2000: ONCE
- 2001–2004: Euskaltel–Euskadi
- 2005–2006: Liberty Seguros–Würth

Major wins
- Grand Tours Tour de France 2 individual stages (1999)

David Etxebarria Alkorta (born 23 July 1973 in Abadiño, Basque Country) is a Spanish former professional road racing cyclist.

== Major results ==
1996
1st Overall Tour de l'Avenir
1st GP Llodio
1998
1st Stage 2 Paris–Nice
1999
1st Overall Euskal Bizikleta
Tour de France

1st Stages 12 & 16

2001
1st Stage 3 Volta a la Comunitat Valenciana
2002
Tour of the Basque Country

1st Stages 5a & 5b

1st Stage 4a Euskal Bizikleta
2003
1st Stage 1 Euskal Bizikleta
2005
1st Klasika Primavera

=== Grand Tour general classification results timeline ===
Grand Tour	1997	1998	1999	2000	2001	2002	2003	2004
Giro d'Italia	Did not contest during his career							
Tour de France	DNF	—	12	DNF	34	60	DNF	77
Vuelta a España	—	30	—	DNF	45	DNF	29	—

Legend
—	Did not compete
DNF	Did not finish
