= Anthony Morin =

French cyclist

Personal information
- Born: 27 June 1974 (age 52) Saint-Brieuc, France

Cycling career
- Sport: Cycling
- Current team: Retired
- Discipline: Road
- Role: Rider

Amateur team
- 1995: Aubervilliers 93 (stagiaire)

Professional teams
- 1996: Force Sud
- 1996–1997: Aubervilliers 93
- 1998–1999: Française des Jeux
- 2000–2003: Crédit Agricole

Anthony Morin (born 27 June 1974 in Saint-Brieuc) is a French former racing cyclist.

== Major results ==
1995
2nd Tour du Finistère
1996
3rd Grand Prix de la Ville de Lillers
1997
1st Stage 5 Tour de l'Avenir
1st Stage 4 Circuito Montañés
2000
2nd Overall Tour de Normandie
3rd National Road Race Championships
2001
1st Stage 5 Tour de France (TTT)
2nd Circuit de la Sarthe
2004
1st Stage 3 Tour de Guadeloupe
