= Gorka Arrizabalaga =

Spanish cyclist (born 1977)

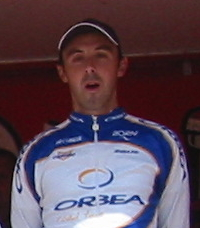
- Arrizabalaga in 2005

Personal information
- Full name: Gorka Arrizabalaga Aguirre
- Born: 14 April 1977 (age 49) Mallabia, Biscay, Spanish Basque Country, Kingdom of Spain

Cycling career
- Sport: Cycling
- Discipline: Road
- Role: Rider

Professional teams
- 2000–2004: Euskaltel–Euskadi
- 2005: Orbea

Gorka Arrizabalaga Aguirre (born 14 April 1977) is a former professional cyclist from the Spanish Basque Country.
