= Steve De Wolf =

Belgian cyclist

Personal information
- Born: 31 August 1975 (age 51) Ninove, Belgium

Cycling career
- Sport: Cycling
- Current team: Retired
- Discipline: Road
- Role: Rider

Professional teams
- 1997–1998: Lotto-Mobistar
- 1999–2000: Cofidis
- 2001–2002: Domo-Farm Frites
- 2003: Palmans-Collstrop

Steve De Wolf (born 31 August 1975 in Ninove) is a former Belgian cyclist.

== Major results ==
1995
1st Internationale Wielertrofee Jong Maar Moedig
1996
3rd Circuit de Wallonie
1997
3rd Tour de Vendée
