= Tom Steels =

Belgian cyclist

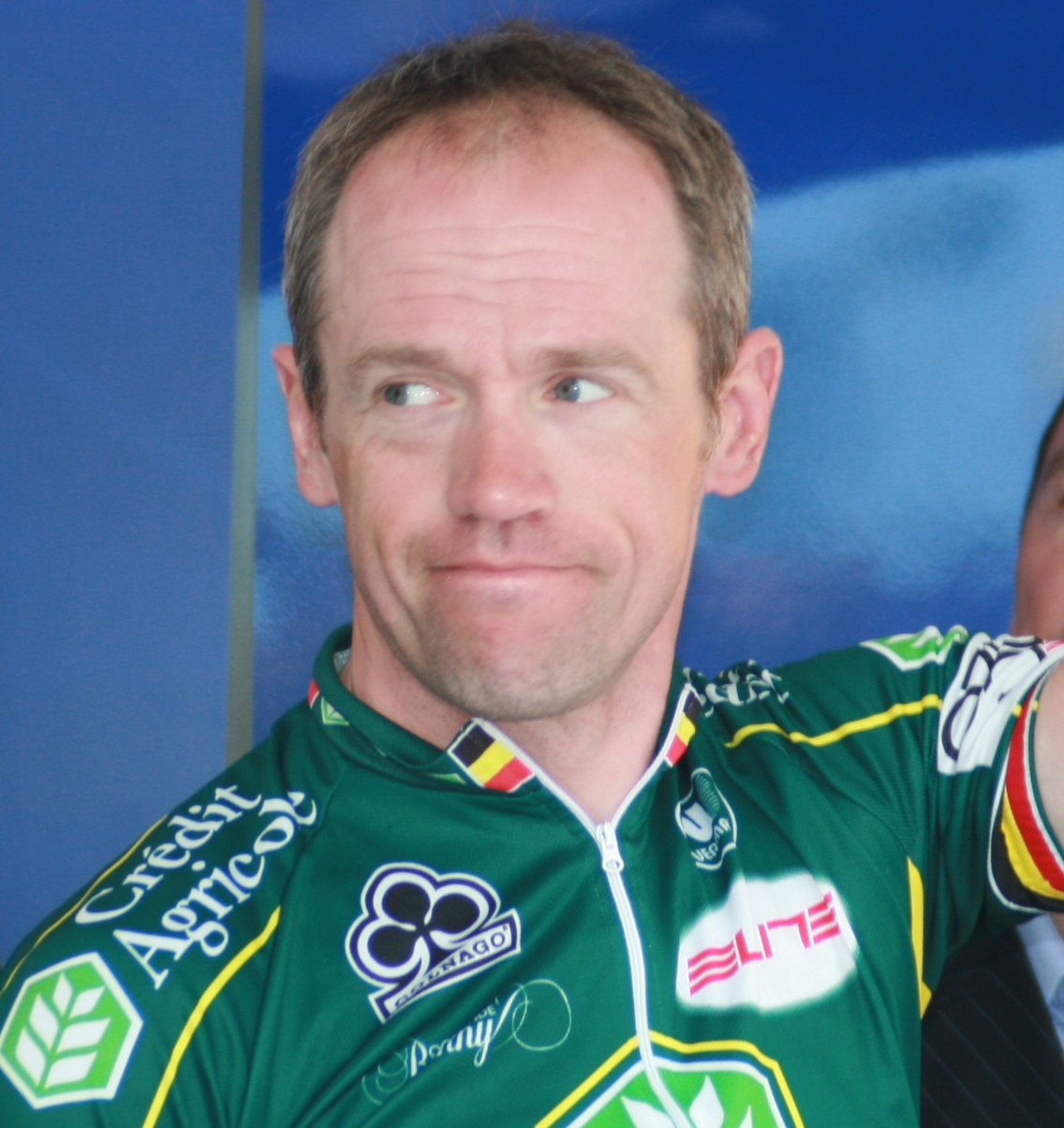
- Steels in 2008

Personal information
- Full name: Tom Steels
- Nickname: Tom Bidon
- Born: 2 September 1971 (age 55) Sint-Gillis-Waas, Belgium
- Height: 1.79 m (5 ft 10 1/2 in)
- Weight: 73 kg (161 lb; 11 st 7 lb)

Cycling career
- Sport: Cycling
- Discipline: Road
- Role: Rider (retired)
- Rider type: Sprinter

Professional teams
- 1994–1995: Vlaanderen 2002
- 1996–2002: Mapei
- 2003–2004: Landbouwkrediet–Colnago
- 2005–2007: Davitamon–Lotto
- 2008: Landbouwkrediet–Tönissteiner

Major wins
- Grand Tours Tour de France 9 individual stages (1998–2000) Vuelta a España 2 individual stages (1996) One-day races and Classics National Road Race Championships (1997, 1998, 2002, 2004) Gent–Wevelgem (1996, 1999) Dwars door België (1998) Omloop Het Volk (1996) Nationale Sluitingsprijs (1995)

Tom Steels (born 2 September 1971) is a Belgian former professional road bicycle racer, specialising in sprint finishes and one-day races. He was one of the top sprinters in the peloton.

Steels competed at the 1992 Summer Olympics in Barcelona, in the Men's 1000 metres Time Trial, finishing 19th.

Steels began his professional cycling career in 1994 with the Vlaanderen 2002 team, winning eight times in his first two seasons. His breakthrough was after he signed with Mapei in 1996. That year he won Omloop Het Volk, and Gent–Wevelgem. In 1997, he rode in his first Tour de France, and looked capable of a stage win after coming second on Stage 2. However, during the sprint for the finish for the sixth stage he found himself blocked and boxed in by other sprinters and in frustration threw his water bottle at another rider, an offence for which he was disqualified from that year's Tour. As a result, he earned the nickname "Tom Bidon".

His best season was 1998 when he won the national championship for the second time and returned to the Tour de France to win four stages. The points jersey would also have been his, as the people in front of him all admitted to doping. Steels won five more stages in the 1999 and 2000 Tour de France. He was also national champion in 2002 and 2004 which made him the record holder of Belgian road championships. 2006 was his first year as a professional that he failed to win a race.

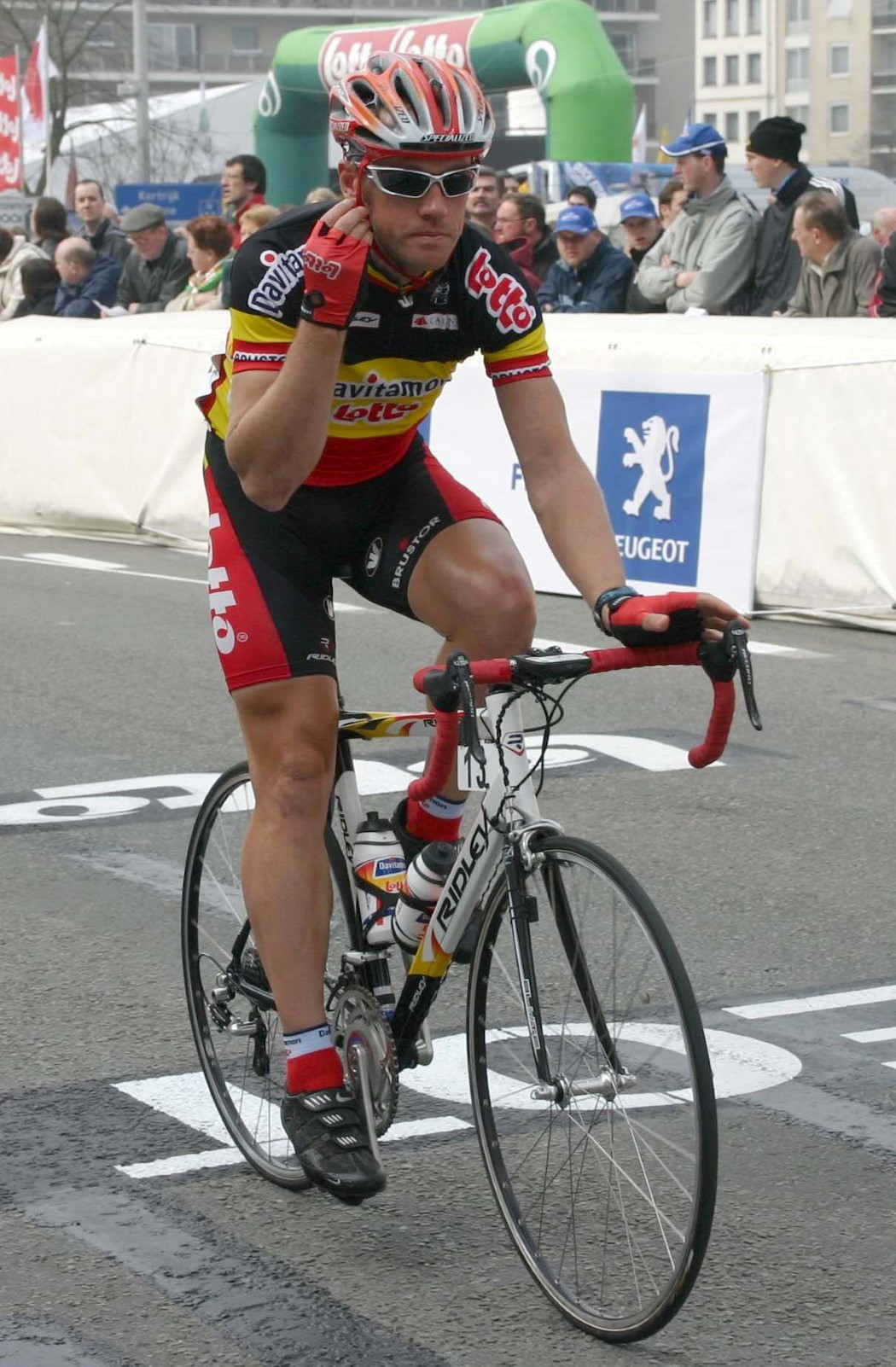
Steels during the 2005 E3 Harelbeke

Steels retired from racing at the end of the 2008 season, during which he raced for Landbouwkrediet – Tönissteiner. In October 2010 he started as a coach for Quick Step, a Protour team, during 2011.

He is the uncle of fellow racing cyclist Stijn Steels.

== Major results ==
1994
1st Stage 10 Tour de l'Avenir

- GP Zele

3rd Grand Prix Rik Van Steenbergen
1995
1st Grote 1-MeiPrijs
1st Grand Prix Rik Van Steenbergen
1st Nationale Sluitingsprijs
1st Dwars door ’t Pajottenland
1st Stage 6 K-Mart West-Virginia Mountain Classic
1st Stage 5 Tour of the Netherlands
2nd Dwars door België
2nd Belgian National Road Race Championships
5th Kuurne–Brussels–Kuurne
6th Lancaster Classic
8th Le Samyn
9th Overall Tour de l'Oise
10th Reading Classic
10th Grote Prijs Jef Scherens
1996
1st Omloop Het Volk
1st Gent–Wevelgem
1st De Kustpijl
Vuelta a España

1st Stages 4 & 22

1st Stage 2 Tour Méditerranéen
1st Stage 5 Volta a Galicia
1st Criterium Aalst
2nd Scheldeprijs
2nd Rund um Köln
2nd Paris–Tours
3rd Binche-Tournai-Binche
5th Belgian National Road Race Championships
9th Grand Prix Cholet-Pays de la Loire
1997
1st Belgian National Road Race Championships
1st Trofeo Calvià
1st Schaal Sels
Paris–Nice

1st Points classification
1st Stages 1, 2, 4 & 7

Tour de Wallonie

1st Stages 4 & 5

1st Stage 2 Tour de Luxembourg
1st Stage 7 Tour de Suisse
2nd Kampioenschap van Vlaanderen
3rd Trofeo Manacor
6th Trofeo Alcúdia
10th Grote Prijs Stad Zottegem
1998
1st Belgian National Road Race Championships
1st Trofeo Sóller
1st Trofeo Calvià
1st Dwars door België
Vuelta a Andalucía

1st Points classification
1st Stages 2 & 5

Paris–Nice

1st Points classification
1st Stages 3 & 4

Tour de France

1st Stages 1, 12, 18 & 21

3rd Omloop van de Vlaamse Scheldeboorden
6th Omloop Mandel
7th Trofeo Manacor
10th Kampioenschap van Vlaanderen
1999
1st Gent–Wevelgem
Vuelta a Andalucía

1st Stages 1 & 5

Tour de France

1st Stages 2, 3 & 17

1st Stage 8 Paris–Nice
1st Stage 1 Driedaagse van de Panne
2nd Trofeo Palma de Mallorca
3rd Trofeo Alcúdia
3rd Omloop Het Volk
3rd Paris–Roubaix
4th Dwars door België
4th Omloop Mandel
5th E3 Prijs Vlaanderen
6th Trofeo Luis Puig
6th Grand Prix Eddy Merckx (with Leif Hoste)
2000
Tour de France

1st Stages 2 & 3

Tour de Wallonie

1st Stages 2 & 6

1st Stage 4 Tour Méditerranéen
1st Stage 8 Paris–Nice
1st Stage 2 Driedaagse van de Panne
4th Belgian National Road Race Championships
6th Omloop Het Volk
9th Scheldeprijs
2001
Tour of Sweden

1st Stages 2 & 3

1st Stage 1 Deutschland Tour
3rd Trofeo Palma de Mallorca
7th Kuurne–Brussels–Kuurne
2002
1st Belgian National Road Race Championships
1st Stage 6 Four Days of Dunkirk
1st Stage 6 Volta a Catalunya
2nd Trofeo Alcúdia
2nd Scheldeprijs
4th Trofeo Cala Millor
6th Trofeo Palma de Mallorca
8th Schaal Sels
2003
Tour of Belgium

1st Points classification
1st Stage 1

1st Stage 3 Étoile de Bessèges
1st Stage 7 Tour of Austria
1st Heusden criterium
9th Nokere Koerse
2004
1st Belgian National Road Race Championships
Tour of Austria

1st Points classification
1st Stages 1 & 3

1st Stage 1 Étoile de Bessèges
1st Stage 2 Tour de Luxembourg
1st St Niklaas criterium
6th Memorial Rik Van Steenbergen
9th Châteauroux Classic
2005
Étoile de Bessèges

1st Stages 2 & 4

1st Stage 2 Volta ao Algarve
1st Stage 3a Driedaagse van de Panne
2nd St Niklaas criterium
7th Gent–Wevelgem
2006
9th Paris–Tours
9th Nationale Sluitingsprijs
2007
9th Eindhoven Team Time Trial
2008
2nd St Niklaas criterium
