= Frédéric Bessy =

French cyclist

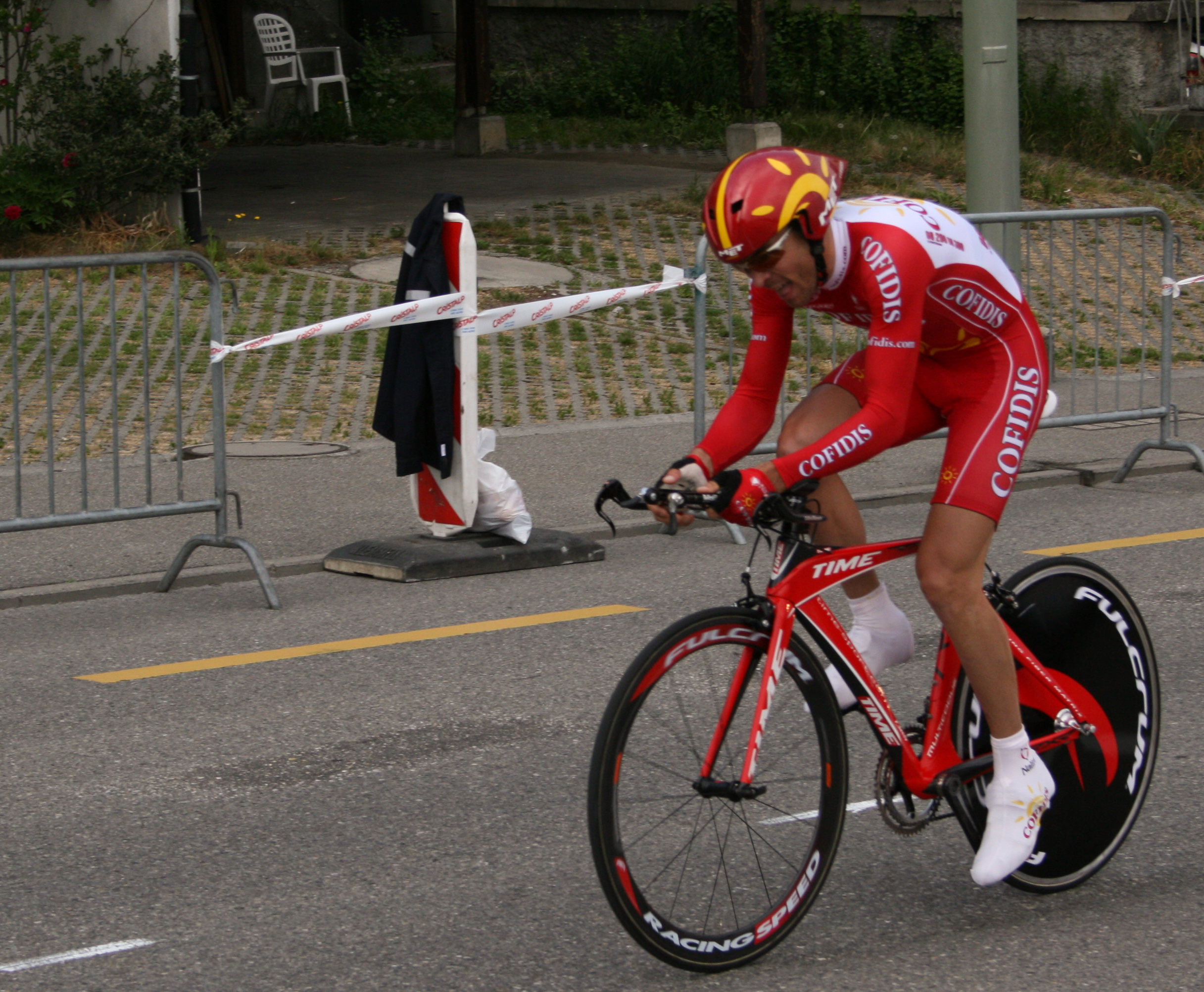
- Bessy in the 2007 Tour de Romandie

Personal information
- Full name: Frédéric Bessy
- Born: 9 January 1972 (age 54) Villefranche-sur-Saône, France
- Height: 1.76 m (5 ft 9 in)
- Weight: 65 kg (143 lb)

Cycling career
- Sport: Cycling
- Discipline: Road
- Role: Rider

Professional teams
- 1992–1999: Casino
- 2000: Jean Delatour
- 2001–2002: Crédit Agricole
- 2003–2007: Cofidis

Major wins
- GP Lugano (2004)

Frédéric Bessy (born 9 January 1972 in Villefranche-sur-Saône) is a French former professional road bicycle racer, last riding for UCI ProTeam Cofidis.

== Major results ==
- Prix des Blés d'Or (1998)
- 1st Stage 5 TTT 2001 Tour de France
- GP Lugano (2004)
