= 2003 UCI Road World Cup =

- Fifteenth edition of the UCI Road World Cup

Details
- Dates: March 22 – October 18
- Location: Europe
- Races: 10

Champions
- Individual champion: Paolo Bettini (ITA) (Quick-Step–Davitamon)
- Teams' champion: Saeco

The 2003 UCI Road World Cup was the fifteenth edition of the UCI Road World Cup. It had the same calendar of the 2000 edition.

The previous year winner, Paolo Bettini, was the big favourite of the competition and he begins with the win in the Milan-Sanremo with a great attack along Mirko Celestino and teammate Luca Paolini escaping from the main group with the race's favourite, previous year winner and world champion, Mario Cipollini. However, an injury in the Gent–Wevelgem (not in the World Cup, between Tour of Flanders and Paris-Roubaix) forced Bettini to miss all the other spring races.

Peter Van Petegem with an historic double Tour of Flanders - Paris-Roubaix, took the lead of the competition.

In the summer races, Bettini came back strong with a back-to back wins in the HEW Cyclassics, preceding the Tour de France runner-up Jan Ullrich, and in the Clásica de San Sebastián, with an all-Italian top five. Bettini was almost sure of his second World Cup with the third place in Züri-Metzgete.

The autumn races saw Bettini, Van Petegem e Boogerd, the top three in the classification after Zurich, taking low positions in Paris-Tours and in Giro di Lombardia. The final podium saw Bettini with a high margin over Boogerd and Van Petegem, divided by only a single point.

== Races ==
Date	Race	Country	Winner	Team	World Cup Leader	Leader's Team	Report
March 22	Milan–San Remo	Italy	Paolo Bettini (ITA)	Quick-Step–Davitamon	Paolo Bettini (ITA)	Quick-Step–Davitamon	Report
April 6	Tour of Flanders	Belgium	Peter Van Petegem (BEL)	Lotto–Domo	Peter Van Petegem (BEL)	Lotto–Domo	Report
April 13	Paris–Roubaix	France	Peter Van Petegem (BEL)	Lotto–Domo	Peter Van Petegem (BEL)	Lotto–Domo	Report
April 20	Amstel Gold Race	Netherlands	Alexander Vinokourov (KAZ)	Team Telekom	Peter Van Petegem (BEL)	Lotto–Domo	Report
April 27	Liège–Bastogne–Liège	Belgium	Tyler Hamilton (USA)	Team CSC	Peter Van Petegem (BEL)	Lotto–Domo	Report
August 3	HEW Cyclassics	Germany	Paolo Bettini (ITA)	Quick-Step–Davitamon	Peter Van Petegem (BEL)	Lotto–Domo	Report
August 9	Clásica de San Sebastián	Spain	Paolo Bettini (ITA)	Quick-Step–Davitamon	Paolo Bettini (ITA)	Quick-Step–Davitamon	Report
August 17	Züri-Metzgete	Switzerland	Daniele Nardello (ITA)	Team Telekom	Paolo Bettini (ITA)	Quick-Step–Davitamon	Report
October 5	Paris–Tours	France	Erik Zabel (GER)	Team Telekom	Paolo Bettini (ITA)	Quick-Step–Davitamon	Report
October 18	Giro di Lombardia	Italy	Michele Bartoli (ITA)	Fassa Bortolo	Paolo Bettini (ITA)	Quick-Step–Davitamon	Report

== Single races details ==
worldcupjersey	Denotes the Classification Leader

In the race results the leader jersey identify the rider who wore the jersey in the race (the leader at the start of the race).

In the general classification table the jersey identify the leader after the race.

22 March 2003 — Milan–San Remo 297 km (184.5 mi)

	Rider	Team	Time
1	Paolo Bettini (ITA)	Quick-Step–Davitamon	6h 44' 43"
2	Mirko Celestino (ITA)	Saeco	s.t.
3	Luca Paolini (ITA)	Quick-Step–Davitamon	+2"
4	Mario Cipollini (ITA)	Domina Vacanze–Elitron	+11"
5	Dario Pieri (ITA)	Saeco	s.t.
6	Erik Zabel (GER)	Team Telekom	s.t.
7	Óscar Freire (ESP)	Rabobank	s.t.
8	Ján Svorada (CZE)	Lampre	s.t.
9	Serguei Ivanov (RUS)	Fassa Bortolo	s.t.
10	Guido Trenti (USA)	Fassa Bortolo	s.t.

General classification after Milan–San Remo

	Rider	Team	Points
1	Paolo Bettini (ITA)	Quick-Step–Davitamon	100
2	Mirko Celestino (ITA)	Saeco	70
3	Luca Paolini (ITA)	Quick-Step–Davitamon	50
4	Mario Cipollini (ITA)	Domina Vacanze–Elitron	40
5	Dario Pieri (ITA)	Saeco	36
6	Erik Zabel (GER)	Team Telekom	32
7	Óscar Freire (ESP)	Rabobank	28
8	Ján Svorada (CZE)	Lampre	24
9	Serguei Ivanov (RUS)	Fassa Bortolo	20
10	Guido Trenti (USA)	Fassa Bortolo	16

6 April 2003 — Tour of Flanders 254 km (157.8 mi)

	Rider	Team	Time
1	Peter Van Petegem (BEL)	Lotto–Domo	6h 18' 48"
2	Frank Vandenbroucke (BEL)	Quick-Step–Davitamon	+ 2"
3	Stuart O'Grady (AUS)	Crédit Agricole	+ 19"
4	Fabio Baldato (ITA)	Alessio	s.t.
5	Nico Mattan (BEL)	Cofidis	s.t.
6	Frédéric Guesdon (FRA)	FDJeux.com	s.t.
7	Sergei Ivanov (RUS)	Fassa Bortolo	s.t.
8	Viatcheslav Ekimov (RUS)	U.S. Postal Service	s.t.
9	Michael Boogerd (NED)	Rabobank	s.t.
10	Dave Bruylandts (BEL)	Marlux–Wincor Nixdorf	s.t.

General classification after Tour of Flanders

	Rider	Team	Points
1	Peter Van Petegem (BEL)	Lotto–Domo	100
2	Paolo Bettini (ITA)	Quick-Step–Davitamon	100
3	Mirko Celestino (ITA)	Saeco	85
4	Frank Vandenbroucke (BEL)	Quick-Step–Davitamon	70
5	Stuart O'Grady (AUS)	Crédit Agricole	55
6	Luca Paolini (ITA)	Quick-Step–Davitamon	50
7	Sergei Ivanov (RUS)	Fassa Bortolo	48
8	Dario Pieri (ITA)	Saeco	47
9	Fabio Baldato (ITA)	Alessio	40
10	Mario Cipollini (ITA)	Domina Vacanze–Elitron	40

13 April 2003 — Paris–Roubaix 261 km (162.2 mi)

	Rider	Team	Time
1	Peter Van Petegem (BEL)	Lotto–Domo	6h 11'35"
2	Dario Pieri (ITA)	Saeco	s.t.
3	Viatcheslav Ekimov (RUS)	U.S. Postal Service	s.t.
4	Marc Wauters (BEL)	Rabobank	+ 15"
5	Andrea Tafi (ITA)	Team CSC	+ 36"
6	Romāns Vainšteins (LAT)	Vini Caldirola–So.di	s.t.
7	Servais Knaven (NED)	Quick-Step–Davitamon	s.t.
8	Daniele Nardello (ITA)	Team Telekom	s.t.
9	Rolf Aldag (GER)	Team Telekom	s.t.
10	Serguei Ivanov (RUS)	Fassa Bortolo	+ 1' 08"

General classification after Paris–Roubaix

	Rider	Team	Points
1	Peter Van Petegem (BEL)	Lotto–Domo	200
2	Dario Pieri (ITA)	Saeco	117
3	Paolo Bettini (ITA)	Quick-Step–Davitamon	100
4	Mirko Celestino (ITA)	Saeco	85
5	Viatcheslav Ekimov (RUS)	U.S. Postal Service	74
6	Frank Vandenbroucke (BEL)	Quick-Step–Davitamon	70
7	Sergei Ivanov (RUS)	Fassa Bortolo	64
8	Stuart O'Grady (AUS)	Crédit Agricole	63
9	Fabio Baldato (ITA)	Alessio	55
10	Luca Paolini (ITA)	Quick-Step–Davitamon	50

20 April 2003 — Amstel Gold Race 250.7 km (155.8 mi)

	Rider	Team	Time
1	Alexander Vinokourov (KAZ)	Team Telekom	6h 01' 03"
2	Michael Boogerd (NED)	Rabobank	+ 4"
3	Danilo Di Luca (ITA)	Saeco	s.t.
4	Davide Rebellin (ITA)	Gerolsteiner	s.t.
5	Matthias Kessler (GER)	Team Telekom	s.t.
6	Francesco Casagrande (ITA)	Lampre	+ 6"
7	Michele Scarponi (ITA)	Domina Vacanze–Elitron	s.t.
~~8~~	~~Lance Armstrong (USA)~~	U.S. Postal Service	+ 8"
9	Ángel Vicioso (ESP)	ONCE–Eroski	+ 12"
10	Igor Astarloa (ESP)	Saeco	+ 20"

General classification after Amstel Gold Race

	Rider	Team	Points
1	Peter Van Petegem (BEL)	Lotto–Domo	200
2	Dario Pieri (ITA)	Saeco	117
3	Alexander Vinokourov (KAZ)	Team Telekom	100
4	Paolo Bettini (ITA)	Quick-Step–Davitamon	100
5	Michael Boogerd (NED)	Rabobank	90
6	Mirko Celestino (ITA)	Saeco	86
7	Serguei Ivanov (RUS)	Fassa Bortolo	79
8	Frank Vandenbroucke (BEL)	Quick-Step–Davitamon	77
9	Viatcheslav Ekimov (RUS)	U.S. Postal Service	74
10	Stuart O'Grady (AUS)	Crédit Agricole	63

27 April 2003 — Liège–Bastogne–Liège 258.5 km (160.6 mi)

	Rider	Team	Time
1	Tyler Hamilton (USA)	Team CSC	6h 28' 50"
2	Iban Mayo (ESP)	Euskaltel–Euskadi	+ 12"
3	Michael Boogerd (NED)	Rabobank	+ 14"
4	Michele Scarponi (ITA)	Domina Vacanze–Elitron	+ 21"
5	Francesco Casagrande (ITA)	Lampre	+ 29"
6	Samuel Sánchez (ESP)	Euskaltel–Euskadi	s.t.
7	Javier Pascual Rodríguez (ESP)	iBanesto.com	s.t.
8	Danilo Di Luca (ITA)	Saeco	s.t.
9	Eddy Mazzoleni (ITA)	Vini Caldirola–So.di	s.t.
10	Ivan Basso (ITA)	Fassa Bortolo	s.t.

General classification after Liège–Bastogne–Liège

	Rider	Team	Points
1	Peter Van Petegem (BEL)	Lotto–Domo	200
2	Michael Boogerd (NED)	Rabobank	140
3	Dario Pieri (ITA)	Saeco	117
4	Tyler Hamilton (USA)	Team CSC	100
5	Alexander Vinokourov (KAZ)	Team Telekom	100
6	Paolo Bettini (ITA)	Quick-Step–Davitamon	100
7	Frank Vandenbroucke (BEL)	Quick-Step–Davitamon	92
8	Mirko Celestino (ITA)	Saeco	91
9	Serguei Ivanov (RUS)	Fassa Bortolo	79
10	Danilo Di Luca (ITA)	Saeco	74

2 August 2003 — HEW Cyclassics 250.3 km (155.5 mi)

	Rider	Team	Time
1	Paolo Bettini (ITA)	Quick-Step–Davitamon	5h 58' 20"
2	Davide Rebellin (ITA)	Gerolsteiner	s.t.
3	Jan Ullrich (GER)	Team Bianchi	s.t.
4	Igor Astarloa (ESP)	Saeco	s.t.
5	Mirko Celestino (ITA)	Saeco	s.t.
6	Erik Zabel (GER)	Team Telekom	+ 3"
7	Fabio Baldato (ITA)	Alessio	s.t.
8	Giovanni Lombardi (ITA)	Domina Vacanze–Elitron	s.t.
9	Stefano Zanini (ITA)	Saeco	s.t.
10	Andrea Ferrigato (ITA)	Alessio	s.t.

General classification after HEW Cyclassics

	Rider	Team	Points
1	Peter Van Petegem (BEL)	Lotto–Domo	203
2	Paolo Bettini (ITA)	Quick-Step–Davitamon	200
3	Michael Boogerd (NED)	Rabobank	140
4	Mirko Celestino (ITA)	Saeco	127
5	Davide Rebellin (ITA)	Gerolsteiner	123
6	Dario Pieri (ITA)	Saeco	117
7	Alexander Vinokourov (KAZ)	Team Telekom	100
8	Frank Vandenbroucke (BEL)	Quick-Step–Davitamon	92
9	Erik Zabel (GER)	Team Telekom	86
10	Fabio Baldato (ITA)	Alessio	83

9 August 2003 — Clásica de San Sebastián 227 km (141.1 mi)

	Rider	Team	Time
1	Paolo Bettini (ITA)	Quick-Step–Davitamon	5h 44' 42"
2	Ivan Basso (ITA)	Fassa Bortolo	s.t.
3	Danilo Di Luca (ITA)	Saeco	+ 20"
4	Francesco Casagrande (ITA)	Lampre	s.t.
5	Andrea Noè (ITA)	Alessio	+ 23"
6	Gorka Gerrikagoitia (ESP)	Euskaltel–Euskadi	+ 33"
7	Davide Rebellin (ITA)	Gerolsteiner	s.t.
8	Michael Boogerd (NED)	Rabobank	+ 34"
9	Michael Rasmussen (DEN)	Rabobank	+ 37"
10	Paolo Valoti (ITA)	De Nardi–Colpack	+ 1' 53"

General classification after Clásica de San Sebastián

	Rider	Team	Points
1	Paolo Bettini (ITA)	Quick-Step–Davitamon	300
2	Peter Van Petegem (BEL)	Lotto–Domo	203
3	Michael Boogerd (NED)	Rabobank	164
4	Davide Rebellin (ITA)	Gerolsteiner	151
5	Mirko Celestino (ITA)	Saeco	139
6	Danilo Di Luca (ITA)	Saeco	124
7	Dario Pieri (ITA)	Saeco	117
8	Francesco Casagrande (ITA)	Lampre	108
9	Alexander Vinokourov (KAZ)	Team Telekom	100
10	Frank Vandenbroucke (BEL)	Quick-Step–Davitamon	92

17 August 2003 — Züri-Metzgete 236.6 km (147.0 mi)

	Rider	Team	Time
1	Daniele Nardello (ITA)	Team Telekom	5h 55' 30"
2	Jan Ullrich (GER)	Team Bianchi	+ 6"
3	Paolo Bettini (ITA)	Quick-Step–Davitamon	+ 11"
4	Michael Boogerd (NED)	Rabobank	s.t.
5	Davide Rebellin (ITA)	Gerolsteiner	s.t.
6	Javier Pascual Rodríguez (ESP)	iBanesto.com	s.t.
7	Oscar Camenzind (SUI)	Phonak	s.t.
8	David Moncoutié (FRA)	Cofidis	s.t.
9	Michele Scarponi (ITA)	Domina Vacanze–Elitron	s.t.
10	Cristian Moreni (ITA)	Alessio	s.t.

General classification after Züri-Metzgete

	Rider	Team	Points
1	Paolo Bettini (ITA)	Quick-Step–Davitamon	350
2	Michael Boogerd (NED)	Rabobank	204
3	Peter Van Petegem (BEL)	Lotto–Domo	203
4	Davide Rebellin (ITA)	Gerolsteiner	187
5	Mirko Celestino (ITA)	Saeco	139
6	Danilo Di Luca (ITA)	Saeco	136
7	Daniele Nardello (ITA)	Team Telekom	124
8	Francesco Casagrande (ITA)	Lampre	123
9	Dario Pieri (ITA)	Saeco	117
10	Alexander Vinokourov (KAZ)	Team Telekom	100

5 October 2003 — Paris–Tours 257 km (159.7 mi)

	Rider	Team	Time
1	Erik Zabel (GER)	Team Telekom	5h 24' 55"
2	Alessandro Petacchi (ITA)	Fassa Bortolo	s.t.
3	Stuart O'Grady (AUS)	Crédit Agricole	s.t.
4	Baden Cooke (AUS)	FDJeux.com	s.t.
5	Franck Rénier (FRA)	Brioches La Boulangère	s.t.
6	Julian Dean (NZL)	Team CSC	s.t.
7	Stefano Zanini (ITA)	Saeco	s.t.
8	Luca Paolini (ITA)	Quick-Step–Davitamon	s.t.
9	Fred Rodriguez (USA)	Vini Caldirola–So.di	s.t.
10	Peter Van Petegem (BEL)	Lotto–Domo	s.t.

General classification after Paris–Tours

	Rider	Team	Points
1	Paolo Bettini (ITA)	Quick-Step–Davitamon	365
2	Peter Van Petegem (BEL)	Lotto–Domo	219
3	Michael Boogerd (NED)	Rabobank	204
4	Davide Rebellin (ITA)	Gerolsteiner	187
5	Erik Zabel (GER)	Team Telekom	186
6	Danilo Di Luca (ITA)	Saeco	140
7	Mirko Celestino (ITA)	Saeco	139
8	Daniele Nardello (ITA)	Team Telekom	124
9	Stuart O'Grady (AUS)	Crédit Agricole	124
10	Francesco Casagrande (ITA)	Lampre	123

18 October 2003 — Giro di Lombardia 249 km (154.7 mi)

	Rider	Team	Time
1	Michele Bartoli (ITA)	Fassa Bortolo	6h 29' 41"
2	Angelo Lopeboselli (ITA)	Cofidis	+ 2"
3	Dario Frigo (ITA)	Fassa Bortolo	+ 1' 31"
4	Beat Zberg (SUI)	Rabobank	+ 1' 47"
5	Miguel Ángel Martín Perdiguero (ESP)	Domina Vacanze–Elitron	s.t.
6	Cédric Vasseur (FRA)	Cofidis	s.t.
7	Serhiy Honchar (UKR)	De Nardi–Colpack	s.t.
8	Patrik Sinkewitz (GER)	Quick-Step–Davitamon	s.t.
9	Guido Trentin (ITA)	Cofidis	s.t.
10	Michael Boogerd (NED)	Rabobank	s.t.

General classification after Giro di Lombardia

	Rider	Team	Points
1	Paolo Bettini (ITA)	Quick-Step–Davitamon	365
2	Michael Boogerd (NED)	Rabobank	220
3	Peter Van Petegem (BEL)	Lotto–Domo	219
4	Davide Rebellin (ITA)	Gerolsteiner	187
5	Erik Zabel (GER)	Team Telekom	186
6	Danilo Di Luca (ITA)	Saeco	140
7	Mirko Celestino (ITA)	Saeco	139
8	Daniele Nardello (ITA)	Team Telekom	124
9	Michele Bartoli (ITA)	Fassa Bortolo	124
10	Francesco Casagrande (ITA)	Lampre	123

== Final standings ==
=== Individual ===
Points are awarded to the top 25 classified riders. Riders must start at least 6 races to be classified.

The points are awarded for every race using the following system:

Position	1st	2nd	3rd	4th	5th	6th	7th	8th	9th	10th	11th	12th	13th	14th	15th	16th	17th	18th	19th	20th	21st	22nd	23rd	24th	25th
Points	100	70	50	40	36	32	28	24	20	16	15	14	13	12	11	10	9	8	7	6	5	4	3	2	1

Pos.	Rider	Team	MSR	ToF	ROU	AGR	LBL	HEW	CSS	ZUR	TOU	LOM	Pts.
1	Paolo Bettini (ITA)	Quick-Step–Davitamon	100	0	DNS	DNS	DNS	100	100	50	15	0	365
2	Michael Boogerd (NED)	Rabobank	DNS	20	DNS	70	50	0	24	40	DNS	16	220
3	Peter Van Petegem (BEL)	Lotto–Domo	DNS	100	100	0	0	3	0	0	16	DNS	219
4	Davide Rebellin (ITA)	Gerolsteiner	0	DNS	DNS	40	13	70	28	36	0	0	187
5	Erik Zabel (GER)	Team Telekom	32	0	11	11	DNS	32	DNS	DNS	100	DNS	186
6	Danilo Di Luca (ITA)	Saeco	0	DNS	DNS	50	24	0	50	12	4	0	140
7	Mirko Celestino (ITA)	Saeco	70	15	DNS	1	5	36	12	0	DNS	0	139
8	Michele Bartoli (ITA)	Fassa Bortolo	0	10	DNS	10	4	0	0	0	0	100	124
9	Daniele Nardello (ITA)	Team Telekom	DNS	0	24	0	0	DNS	0	100	0	DNS	124
10	Francesco Casagrande (ITA)	Lampre	DNS	DNS	DNS	32	36	0	40	15	DNS	0	123
11	Luca Paolini (ITA)	Quick-Step–Davitamon	50	0	DNS	9	0	13	10	0	24	0	106
12	Frank Vandenbroucke (BEL)	Quick-Step–Davitamon	0	70	0	7	15	DNS	DNS	0	DNS	DNS	92
13	Michele Scarponi (ITA)	Domina Vacanze–Elitron	DNS	DNS	DNS	28	40	DNS	0	20	0	0	88
14	Sergei Ivanov (RUS)	Fassa Bortolo	20	28	16	15	0	0	DNS	0	0	DNS	79
15	Viatcheslav Ekimov (RUS)	U.S. Postal Service	0	24	50	0	DNS	0	0	0	0	DNS	74
16	Igor Astarloa (ESP)	Saeco	0	DNS	DNS	16	0	40	15	0	0	0	71
17	Javier Pascual Rodríguez (ESP)	iBanesto.com	0	DNS	DNS	8	28	0	DNS	32	0	DNS	68
18	Beat Zberg (SUI)	Rabobank	7	DNS	DNS	0	0	DNS	8	7	DNS	40	62
19	Matthias Kessler (GER)	Team Telekom	0	DNS	DNS	36	8	0	0	0	0	11	55
20	Stefano Zanini (ITA)	Saeco	0	6	0	0	0	20	DNS	0	28	0	54
Race winners not eligible for general classification
Pos.	Rider	Team	MSR	ToF	ROU	AGR	LBL	HEW	CSS	ZUR	TOU	LOM	Pts.
-	Tyler Hamilton (USA)	Team CSC	DNS	DNS	DNS	DNS	100	DNS	DNS	0	DNS	DNS	100
-	Alexander Vinokourov (KAZ)	Team Telekom	0	DNS	DNS	100	0	DNS	0	0	DNS	DNS	100

Key
Colour	Result
Gold	Winner
Silver	2nd place
Bronze	3rd place
Green	Top ten position
Blue	Other points position
Purple	Out of points, retired
Red	Did not start (DNS)

=== Teams ===
Points are awarded to the top 10 teams. Teams must start at least 8 races to be classified. The first 18 teams in world ranking must start in all races.

The points are awarded for every race using the following system:

Position	1st	2nd	3rd	4th	5th	6th	7th	8th	9th	10th
Points	12	9	8	7	6	5	4	3	2	1

Pos.	Team	MSR	ToF	ROU	AGR	LBL	HEW	CSS	ZUR	TOU	LOM	Pts.
1	Saeco	12	12	0	9	8	12	12	3	8	3	79
2	Quick-Step–Davitamon	6	6	9	5	9	7	9	12	9	0	72
3	Alessio	4	8	0	4	6	9	2	7	7	0	47
4	Rabobank	7	3	0	7	2	3	8	9	0	8	47
5	Fassa Bortolo	9	9	0	6	7	0	0	0	5	9	45
