= 2000 UCI Road World Cup =

- Twelfth edition of the UCI Road World Cup

Details
- Dates: 18 March – 21 October
- Location: Europe
- Races: 10

Champions
- Individual champion: Erik Zabel (GER) (Team Telekom)
- Teams' champion: Mapei–Quick-Step

The 2000 UCI Road World Cup was the twelfth edition of the UCI Road World Cup. It was won by Erik Zabel. Zabel led the classification after all the single races, the only time this feat happened in World Cup history.

== Races ==
Date	Race	Country	Winner	Team	World Cup Leader	Leader's Team	Report
18 March	Milan–San Remo	Italy	Erik Zabel (GER)	Team Telekom	Erik Zabel (GER)	Team Telekom	Report
2 April	Tour of Flanders	Belgium	Andrei Tchmil (BEL)	Lotto–Adecco	Erik Zabel (GER)	Team Telekom	Report
9 April	Paris–Roubaix	France	Johan Museeuw (ITA)	Mapei–Quick-Step	Erik Zabel (GER)	Team Telekom	Report
16 April	Liège–Bastogne–Liège	Belgium	Paolo Bettini (ITA)	Mapei–Quick-Step	Erik Zabel (GER)	Team Telekom	Report
22 April	Amstel Gold Race	Netherlands	Erik Zabel (GER)	Team Telekom	Erik Zabel (GER)	Team Telekom	Report
6 August	HEW Cyclassics	Germany	Gabriele Missaglia (ITA)	Lampre–Daikin	Erik Zabel (GER)	Team Telekom	Report
12 August	Clásica de San Sebastián	Spain	Erik Dekker (NED)	Rabobank	Erik Zabel (GER)	Team Telekom	Report
20 August	Züri-Metzgete	Switzerland	Laurent Dufaux (SUI)	Saeco–Valli & Valli	Erik Zabel (GER)	Team Telekom	Report
8 October	Paris–Tours	France	Andrea Tafi (ITA)	Mapei–Quick-Step	Erik Zabel (GER)	Team Telekom	Report
21 October	Giro di Lombardia	Italy	Raimondas Rumšas (LTU)	Fassa Bortolo	Erik Zabel (GER)	Team Telekom	Report

== Single races details ==
worldcupjersey	Denotes the Classification Leader

In the race results the leader jersey identify the rider who wore the jersey in the race (the leader at the start of the race).

In the general classification table the jersey identify the leader after the race.

18 March 2000 — Milan–San Remo 294 km (182.7 mi)

	Rider	Team	Time
1	Erik Zabel (GER)	Team Telekom	7h 11' 29"
2	Fabio Baldato (ITA)	Fassa Bortolo	s.t.
3	Óscar Freire (ESP)	Mapei–Quick-Step	s.t.
4	Zbigniew Spruch (POL)	Lampre–Daikin	s.t.
5	Sergei Ivanov (RUS)	Farm Frites	s.t.
6	Jo Planckaert (BEL)	Cofidis	s.t.
7	Stefano Garzelli (ITA)	Mercatone Uno–Albacom	s.t.
8	Rolf Sørensen (DEN)	Rabobank	s.t.
9	Romāns Vainšteins (LAT)	Vini Caldirola–Sidermec	s.t.
10	Bo Hamburger (DEN)	Memory Card–Jack & Jones	s.t.

General classification after Milan–San Remo

	Rider	Team	Points
1	Erik Zabel (GER)	Team Telekom	100
2	Fabio Baldato (ITA)	Fassa Bortolo	70
3	Óscar Freire (ESP)	Mapei–Quick-Step	50
4	Zbigniew Spruch (POL)	Lampre–Daikin	40
5	Sergei Ivanov (RUS)	Farm Frites	36
6	Jo Planckaert (BEL)	Cofidis	32
7	Stefano Garzelli (ITA)	Mercatone Uno–Albacom	28
8	Rolf Sørensen (DEN)	Rabobank	24
9	Romāns Vainšteins (LAT)	Vini Caldirola–Sidermec	20
10	Bo Hamburger (DEN)	Memory Card–Jack & Jones	16

2 April 2000 — Tour of Flanders 269 km (167.1 mi)

	Rider	Team	Time
1	Andrei Tchmil (BEL)	Lotto–Adecco	6h 48' 17"
2	Dario Pieri (ITA)	Saeco–Valli & Valli	+ 4"
3	Romāns Vainšteins (LAT)	Vini Caldirola–Sidermec	s.t.
4	Erik Zabel (GER)	Team Telekom	s.t.
5	Tristan Hoffman (NED)	Memory Card–Jack & Jones	s.t.
6	Fabio Sacchi (ITA)	Team Polti	s.t.
7	Léon van Bon (NED)	Rabobank	s.t.
8	Peter Van Petegem (BEL)	Farm Frites	s.t.
9	Zbigniew Spruch (POL)	Lampre–Daikin	s.t.
10	Markus Zberg (SUI)	Rabobank	s.t.

General classification after Tour of Flanders

	Rider	Team	Points
1	Erik Zabel (GER)	Team Telekom	140
2	Andrei Tchmil (BEL)	Lotto–Adecco	108
3	Fabio Baldato (ITA)	Fassa Bortolo	84
4	Dario Pieri (ITA)	Saeco–Valli & Valli	70
5	Romāns Vainšteins (LAT)	Vini Caldirola–Sidermec	70
6	Zbigniew Spruch (POL)	Lampre–Daikin	60
7	Óscar Freire (ESP)	Mapei–Quick-Step	50
8	Tristan Hoffman (NED)	Memory Card–Jack & Jones	36
9	Sergei Ivanov (RUS)	Farm Frites	36
10	Rolf Sørensen (DEN)	Rabobank	36

9 April 2000 — Paris–Roubaix 272 km (169.0 mi)

	Rider	Team	Time
1	Johan Museeuw (BEL)	Mapei–Quick-Step	6h 47' 00"
2	Peter Van Petegem (BEL)	Farm Frites	+ 15"
3	Erik Zabel (GER)	Team Telekom	s.t.
4	Tristan Hoffman (NED)	Memory Card–Jack & Jones	s.t.
5	Stefano Zanini (ITA)	Mapei–Quick-Step	s.t.
6	George Hincapie (USA)	U.S. Postal Service	s.t.
7	Marc Wauters (BEL)	Rabobank	s.t.
8	Franco Ballerini (ITA)	Lampre–Daikin	s.t.
9	Steffen Wesemann (GER)	Team Telekom	+ 21"
10	Andrea Tafi (ITA)	Mapei–Quick-Step	+ 1' 18"

General classification after Paris–Roubaix

	Rider	Team	Points
1	Erik Zabel (GER)	Team Telekom	190
2	Johan Museeuw (BEL)	Mapei–Quick-Step	111
3	Andrei Tchmil (BEL)	Lotto–Adecco	110
4	Peter Van Petegem (BEL)	Farm Frites	94
5	Fabio Baldato (ITA)	Fassa Bortolo	84
6	Romāns Vainšteins (LAT)	Vini Caldirola–Sidermec	82
7	Tristan Hoffman (NED)	Memory Card–Jack & Jones	76
8	Zbigniew Spruch (POL)	Lampre–Daikin	71
9	Dario Pieri (ITA)	Saeco–Valli & Valli	70
10	Óscar Freire (ESP)	Mapei–Quick-Step	50

16 April 2000 — Liège–Bastogne–Liège 264 km (164.0 mi)

	Rider	Team	Time
1	Paolo Bettini (ITA)	Mapei–Quick-Step	6h 28' 32"
2	David Etxebarria (ESP)	ONCE–Deutsche Bank	s.t.
3	Davide Rebellin (ITA)	Liquigas–Pata	s.t.
4	Wladimir Belli (ITA)	Fassa Bortolo	+ 10"
5	Axel Merckx (BEL)	Mapei–Quick-Step	+ 12"
6	Mauro Gianetti (SUI)	Vini Caldirola–Sidermec	+ 30"
7	Alexander Vinokourov (KAZ)	Team Telekom	+ 33"
8	Maarten den Bakker (NED)	Rabobank	+ 40"
9	Francesco Casagrande (ITA)	Vini Caldirola–Sidermec	+ 44"
10	Laurent Jalabert (FRA)	ONCE–Deutsche Bank	+ 48"

General classification after Liège–Bastogne–Liège

	Rider	Team	Points
1	Erik Zabel (GER)	Team Telekom	190
2	Johan Museeuw (BEL)	Mapei–Quick-Step	111
3	Andrei Tchmil (BEL)	Lotto–Adecco	110
4	Paolo Bettini (ITA)	Mapei–Quick-Step	100
5	Peter Van Petegem (BEL)	Farm Frites	94
6	Fabio Baldato (ITA)	Fassa Bortolo	84
7	Romāns Vainšteins (LAT)	Vini Caldirola–Sidermec	82
8	Zbigniew Spruch (POL)	Lampre–Daikin	82
9	Tristan Hoffman (NED)	Memory Card–Jack & Jones	76
10	David Etxebarria (ESP)	ONCE–Deutsche Bank	70

22 April 2000 — Amstel Gold Race 257 km (159.7 mi)

	Rider	Team	Time
1	Erik Zabel (GER)	Team Telekom	6h 13' 37"
2	Michael Boogerd (NED)	Rabobank	s.t.
3	Markus Zberg (SUI)	Rabobank	s.t.
4	Romāns Vainšteins (LAT)	Vini Caldirola–Sidermec	s.t.
5	Hendrik Van Dyck (BEL)	Palmans–Ideal	s.t.
6	Laurent Dufaux (SUI)	Saeco–Valli & Valli	s.t.
7	Peter Van Petegem (BEL)	Farm Frites	s.t.
8	Zbigniew Spruch (POL)	Lampre–Daikin	s.t.
9	Óscar Freire (ESP)	Mapei–Quick-Step	s.t.
10	Francesco Casagrande (ITA)	Vini Caldirola–Sidermec	s.t.

General classification after Amstel Gold Race

	Rider	Team	Points
1	Erik Zabel (GER)	Team Telekom	290
2	Andrei Tchmil (BEL)	Lotto–Adecco	125
3	Peter Van Petegem (BEL)	Farm Frites	122
4	Romāns Vainšteins (LAT)	Vini Caldirola–Sidermec	122
5	Paolo Bettini (ITA)	Mapei–Quick-Step	112
6	Johan Museeuw (BEL)	Mapei–Quick-Step	111
7	Zbigniew Spruch (POL)	Lampre–Daikin	106
8	Markus Zberg (SUI)	Rabobank	90
9	Fabio Baldato (ITA)	Fassa Bortolo	84
10	Michael Boogerd (NED)	Rabobank	79

6 August 2000 — HEW Cyclassics 250.8 km (155.8 mi)

	Rider	Team	Time
1	Gabriele Missaglia (ITA)	Lampre–Daikin	6h 17' 22"
2	Francesco Casagrande (ITA)	Vini Caldirola–Sidermec	s.t.
3	Fabio Baldato (ITA)	Fassa Bortolo	+ 2"
4	Erik Zabel (GER)	Team Telekom	s.t.
5	Thor Hushovd (NOR)	Crédit Agricole	s.t.
6	Gabriele Balducci (ITA)	Fassa Bortolo	s.t.
7	Marco Zanotti (ITA)	Liquigas–Pata	s.t.
8	Massimiliano Mori (ITA)	Saeco–Valli & Valli	s.t.
9	Magnus Bäckstedt (SWE)	Crédit Agricole	s.t.
10	Romāns Vainšteins (LAT)	Vini Caldirola–Sidermec	s.t.

General classification after HEW Cyclassics

	Rider	Team	Points
1	Erik Zabel (GER)	Team Telekom	330
2	Romāns Vainšteins (LAT)	Vini Caldirola–Sidermec	138
3	Andrei Tchmil (BEL)	Lotto–Adecco	136
4	Fabio Baldato (ITA)	Fassa Bortolo	134
5	Peter Van Petegem (BEL)	Farm Frites	122
6	Paolo Bettini (ITA)	Mapei–Quick-Step	120
7	Zbigniew Spruch (POL)	Lampre–Daikin	116
8	Johan Museeuw (BEL)	Mapei–Quick-Step	111
9	Francesco Casagrande (ITA)	Vini Caldirola–Sidermec	106
10	Gabriele Missaglia (ITA)	Lampre–Daikin	102

12 August 2000 — Clásica de San Sebastián 232 km (144.2 mi)

	Rider	Team	Time
1	Erik Dekker (NED)	Rabobank	5h 16' 01"
2	Andrei Tchmil (BEL)	Lotto–Adecco	+ 4"
3	Romāns Vainšteins (LAT)	Vini Caldirola–Sidermec	s.t.
4	Paolo Bettini (ITA)	Mapei–Quick-Step	s.t.
5	Óscar Freire (ESP)	Mapei–Quick-Step	s.t.
6	David Cañada (ESP)	ONCE–Deutsche Bank	s.t.
7	Davide Rebellin (ITA)	Liquigas–Pata	s.t.
8	Andrey Kivilev (KAZ)	AG2R Prévoyance	s.t.
9	Miguel Ángel Martín Perdiguero (ESP)	Vitalicio Seguros	s.t.
10	Peter Farazijn (BEL)	Cofidis	s.t.

General classification after Clásica de San Sebastián

	Rider	Team	Points
1	Erik Zabel (GER)	Team Telekom	330
2	Andrei Tchmil (BEL)	Lotto–Adecco	206
3	Romāns Vainšteins (LAT)	Vini Caldirola–Sidermec	188
4	Paolo Bettini (ITA)	Mapei–Quick-Step	160
5	Fabio Baldato (ITA)	Fassa Bortolo	134
6	Peter Van Petegem (BEL)	Farm Frites	122
7	Óscar Freire (ESP)	Mapei–Quick-Step	119
8	Zbigniew Spruch (POL)	Lampre–Daikin	116
9	Gabriele Missaglia (ITA)	Lampre–Daikin	112
10	Johan Museeuw (BEL)	Mapei–Quick-Step	111

20 August 2000 — Züri-Metzgete 248.4 km (154.3 mi)

	Rider	Team	Time
1	Laurent Dufaux (SUI)	Saeco–Valli & Valli	6h 07' 21"
2	Jan Ullrich (GER)	Team Telekom	s.t.
3	Francesco Casagrande (ITA)	Vini Caldirola–Sidermec	s.t.
4	Davide Rebellin (ITA)	Liquigas–Pata	+ 1' 03"
~~5~~	~~Lance Armstrong (USA)~~	U.S. Postal Service	s.t.
6	Óscar Freire (ESP)	Mapei–Quick-Step	+ 1' 19"
7	Oscar Camenzind (SUI)	Lampre–Daikin	s.t.
8	Andrey Kivilev (KAZ)	AG2R Prévoyance	+ 4' 28"
9	(Italy) Daniele De Paoli	Lotto–Adecco	+ 4' 51"
10	Romāns Vainšteins (LAT)	Vini Caldirola–Sidermec	+ 4' 58"

General classification after Züri-Metzgete

	Rider	Team	Points
1	Erik Zabel (GER)	Team Telekom	332
2	Andrei Tchmil (BEL)	Lotto–Adecco	206
3	Romāns Vainšteins (LAT)	Vini Caldirola–Sidermec	204
4	Paolo Bettini (ITA)	Mapei–Quick-Step	161
5	Francesco Casagrande (ITA)	Vini Caldirola–Sidermec	160
6	Óscar Freire (ESP)	Mapei–Quick-Step	151
7	Laurent Dufaux (SUI)	Saeco–Valli & Valli	137
8	Fabio Baldato (ITA)	Fassa Bortolo	134
9	Davide Rebellin (ITA)	Liquigas–Pata	132
10	Peter Van Petegem (BEL)	Farm Frites	122

8 October 2000 — Paris–Tours 254 km (157.8 mi)

	Rider	Team	Time
1	Andrea Tafi (ITA)	Mapei–Quick-Step	6h 38' 14"
2	Andrei Tchmil (BEL)	Lotto–Adecco	+ 39"
3	Daniele Nardello (ITA)	Mapei–Quick-Step	s.t.
4	Paolo Bettini (ITA)	Mapei–Quick-Step	+ 1' 36"
5	Gorazd Štangelj (SLO)	Liquigas–Pata	+ 1' 39"
6	Rik Verbrugghe (BEL)	Lotto–Adecco	s.t.
7	Zbigniew Spruch (POL)	Lampre–Daikin	s.t.
8	Rolf Sørensen (DEN)	Rabobank	+ 2' 00"
9	Jaan Kirsipuu (EST)	AG2R Prévoyance	+ 2' 05"
10	Alessandro Petacchi (ITA)	Fassa Bortolo	s.t.

General classification after Paris–Tours

	Rider	Team	Points
1	Erik Zabel (GER)	Team Telekom	347
2	Andrei Tchmil (BEL)	Lotto–Adecco	276
3	Romāns Vainšteins (LAT)	Vini Caldirola–Sidermec	204
4	Paolo Bettini (ITA)	Mapei–Quick-Step	201
5	Francesco Casagrande (ITA)	Vini Caldirola–Sidermec	160
6	Óscar Freire (ESP)	Mapei–Quick-Step	151
7	Fabio Baldato (ITA)	Fassa Bortolo	145
8	Zbigniew Spruch (POL)	Lampre–Daikin	144
9	Peter Van Petegem (BEL)	Farm Frites	135
10	Davide Rebellin (ITA)	Liquigas–Pata	132

20 October 2001 — Giro di Lombardia 256 km (159.1 mi)

	Rider	Team	Time
1	Raimondas Rumšas (LTU)	Fassa Bortolo	6h 18' 36"
2	Francesco Casagrande (ITA)	Vini Caldirola–Sidermec	+ 0"
3	Niklas Axelsson (SWE)	Ceramica Panaria–Gaerne	+ 4"
4	Beat Zberg (SUI)	Rabobank	+ 7"
5	Michele Bartoli (ITA)	Mapei–Quick-Step	+ 7"
6	Davide Rebellin (ITA)	Liquigas–Pata	+ 7"
7	Wladimir Belli (ITA)	Fassa Bortolo	+ 22"
8	Massimo Codol (ITA)	Lampre–Daikin	+ 2' 11"
9	Gorazd Štangelj (SLO)	Liquigas–Pata	+ 2' 57"
10	Paolo Bettini (ITA)	Mapei–Quick-Step	+ 3' 35"

General classification after Giro di Lombardia

	Rider	Team	Points
1	Erik Zabel (GER)	Team Telekom	347
2	Andrei Tchmil (BEL)	Lotto–Adecco	285
3	Francesco Casagrande (ITA)	Vini Caldirola–Sidermec	230
4	Paolo Bettini (ITA)	Mapei–Quick-Step	217
5	Romāns Vainšteins (LAT)	Vini Caldirola–Sidermec	204
6	Davide Rebellin (ITA)	Liquigas–Pata	164
7	Óscar Freire (ESP)	Mapei–Quick-Step	164
8	Fabio Baldato (ITA)	Fassa Bortolo	145
9	Zbigniew Spruch (POL)	Lampre–Daikin	144
10	Peter Van Petegem (BEL)	Farm Frites	135

== Final standings ==
=== Individual ===
Points are awarded to the top 25 classified riders. Riders must start at least 6 races to be classified.

The points are awarded for every race using the following system:

Position	1st	2nd	3rd	4th	5th	6th	7th	8th	9th	10th	11th	12th	13th	14th	15th	16th	17th	18th	19th	20th	21st	22nd	23rd	24th	25th
Points	100	70	50	40	36	32	28	24	20	16	15	14	13	12	11	10	9	8	7	6	5	4	3	2	1

Pos.	Rider	Team	MSR	ToF	ROU	LBL	AGR	HEW	CSS	ZUR	TOU	LOM	Pts.
1	Erik Zabel (GER)	Team Telekom	100	40	50	0	100	40	0	2	15	0	347
2	Andrei Tchmil (BEL)	Lotto–Adecco	8	100	2	0	15	11	70	0	70	9	285
3	Francesco Casagrande (ITA)	Vini Caldirola–Sidermec	0	DNS	DNS	20	16	70	4	50	DNS	70	230
4	Paolo Bettini (ITA)	Mapei–Quick-Step	0	DNS	DNS	100	12	8	40	1	40	16	217
5	Romāns Vainšteins (LAT)	Vini Caldirola–Sidermec	20	50	12	DNS	40	16	50	16	0	0	204
6	Davide Rebellin (ITA)	Liquigas–Pata	0	DNS	DNS	50	14	0	28	40	DNS	32	164
7	Óscar Freire (ESP)	Mapei–Quick-Step	50	DNS	DNS	DNS	20	13	36	32	0	13	164
8	Fabio Baldato (ITA)	Fassa Bortolo	70	14	0	DNS	0	50	DNS	0	11	DNS	145
9	Zbigniew Spruch (POL)	Lampre–Daikin	40	20	11	11	24	10	DNS	0	28	0	144
10	Peter Van Petegem (BEL)	Farm Frites	0	24	70	0	28	0	0	0	13	DNS	135
11	Andrea Tafi (ITA)	Mapei–Quick-Step	0	4	16	0	0	0	DNS	DNS	100	1	121
12	Gabriele Missaglia (ITA)	Lampre–Daikin	0	2	DNS	0	0	100	10	0	0	0	112
13	Johan Museeuw (BEL)	Mapei–Quick-Step	11	0	100	0	0	0	DNS	DNS	DNS	DNS	111
14	Markus Zberg (SUI)	Rabobank	12	16	DNS	12	50	0	0	0	3	0	93
15	Michael Boogerd (NED)	Rabobank	DNS	DNS	DNS	9	70	DNS	0	0	0	10	89
16	Oscar Camenzind (SUI)	Lampre–Daikin	0	15	DNS	13	DNS	2	12	28	0	11	81
17	Tristan Hoffman (NED)	Memory Card–Jack & Jones	0	36	40	DNS	0	1	DNS	DNS	0	DNS	77
18	Rolf Sørensen (DEN)	Rabobank	24	12	0	DNS	0	7	DNS	0	24	DNS	67
19	Michele Bartoli (ITA)	Mapei–Quick-Step	0	0	DNS	DNS	DNS	0	0	15	DNS	36	51
20	Léon van Bon (NED)	Rabobank	0	28	3	DNS	0	9	0	DNS	10	DNS	50
Race winners not eligible for general classification
Pos.	Rider	Team	MSR	ToF	ROU	LBL	AGR	HEW	CSS	ZUR	TOU	LOM	Pts.
-	Laurent Dufaux (SUI)	Saeco–Valli & Valli	DNS	DNS	DNS	5	32	DNS	0	100	DNS	DNS	137
-	Raimondas Rumšas (LTU)	Fassa Bortolo	DNS	0	DNS	0	DNS	DNS	5	DNS	0	100	105
-	Erik Dekker (NED)	Rabobank	DNS	DNS	DNS	DNS	DNS	0	100	0	DNS	DNS	100

Key
Colour	Result
Gold	Winner
Silver	2nd place
Bronze	3rd place
Green	Top ten position
Blue	Other points position
Purple	Out of points, retired
Red	Did not start (DNS)

=== Teams ===
Points are awarded to the top 10 teams. Teams must start at least 8 races to be classified. The first 18 teams in world ranking must start in all races.

The points are awarded for every race using the following system:

Position	1st	2nd	3rd	4th	5th	6th	7th	8th	9th	10th
Points	12	9	8	7	6	5	4	3	2	1

Pos.	Team	MSR	ToF	ROU	LBL	AGR	HEW	CSS	ZUR	TOU	LOM	Pts.
1	Mapei–Quick-Step	7	6	12	12	7	7	12	9	12	12	96
2	Rabobank	9	12	4	9	12	6	0	4	7	8	71
3	Fassa Bortolo	12	7	0	8	0	12	6	0	8	7	60
4	Lampre–Daikin	3	9	9	1	3	9	8	5	2	9	58
5	Vini Caldirola–Sidermec	4	1	2	2	8	8	1	12	0	6	44
