= 1999 Giro d'Italia, Stage 12 to Stage 22 =

Cycling race stages

The 1999 Giro d'Italia was the 82nd edition of the Giro d'Italia, one of cycling's Grand Tours. The Giro began in Agrigento, with a flat stage on 15 May, and Stage 12 occurred on 26 May with a stage from Cesenatico. The race finished in Milan on 6 June.

== Stage 12 ==
26 May 1999 — Cesenatico to Sassuolo, 168 km (104 mi)

Stage 12 result

Rank	Rider	Team	Time
1	Mario Cipollini (ITA)	Saeco–Cannondale	4h 07' 07"
2	Ivan Quaranta (ITA)	Mobilvetta Design–Northwave	s.t.
3	Jeroen Blijlevens (NED)	TVM–Farm Frites	s.t.
4	Luca Cei (ITA)	Navigare–Gaerne	s.t.
5	Matteo Tosatto (ITA)	Ballan–Alessio	s.t.
6	Nicola Minali (ITA)	Cantina Tollo–Alexia Alluminio	s.t.
7	Serguei Smetanine (RUS)	Vitalicio Seguros	s.t.
8	Ján Svorada (CZE)	Lampre–Daikin	s.t.
9	Endrio Leoni (ITA)	Liquigas	s.t.
10	Vladimir Duma (UKR)	Navigare–Gaerne	s.t.

Stage 12 result

Rank	Rider	Team	Time
1	Laurent Jalabert (FRA)	ONCE–Deutsche Bank	50h 53' 56"
2	Marco Pantani (ITA)	Mercatone Uno–Bianchi	+ 4"
3	Dario Frigo (ITA)	Saeco–Cannondale	+ 1' 02"
4	Serhiy Honchar (UKR)	Vini Caldirola	+ 1' 13"
5	Ivan Gotti (ITA)	Team Polti	+ 1' 17"
6	Daniel Clavero (ESP)	Vitalicio Seguros	+ 1' 22"
7	Oscar Camenzind (SUI)	Lampre–Daikin	+ 1' 28"
8	Alex Zülle (SUI)	Banesto	+ 2' 08"
9	Niklas Axelsson (SWE)	Navigare–Gaerne	+ 2' 09"
10	Andrea Noè (ITA)	Mapei–Quick-Step	+ 2' 23"

== Stage 13 ==
27 May 1999 — Sassuolo to Rapallo, 243 km (151 mi)

Stage 13 result

Rank	Rider	Team	Time
1	Richard Virenque (FRA)	Team Polti	6h 55' 34"
2	Santiago Blanco (ESP)	Vitalicio Seguros	s.t.
3	Davide Rebellin (ITA)	Team Polti	+ 21"
4	Roberto Sgambelluri (ITA)	Cantina Tollo–Alexia Alluminio	+ 22"
5	Andrey Teteryuk (KAZ)	Liquigas	+ 34"
6	Andrei Zintchenko (RUS)	Vitalicio Seguros	s.t.
7	Gerrit Glomser (AUT)	Navigare–Gaerne	s.t.
8	Giuliano Figueras (ITA)	Mapei–Quick-Step	s.t.
9	Enrico Zaina (ITA)	Mercatone Uno–Bianchi	s.t.
10	Oscar Camenzind (SUI)	Lampre–Daikin	s.t.

Stage 13 result

Rank	Rider	Team	Time
1	Laurent Jalabert (FRA)	ONCE–Deutsche Bank	57h 50' 04"
2	Marco Pantani (ITA)	Mercatone Uno–Bianchi	+ 4"
3	Serhiy Honchar (UKR)	Vini Caldirola	+ 1' 13"
4	Ivan Gotti (ITA)	Team Polti	+ 1' 17"
5	Daniel Clavero (ESP)	Vitalicio Seguros	+ 1' 22"
6	Oscar Camenzind (SUI)	Lampre–Daikin	+ 1' 28"
7	Alex Zülle (SUI)	Banesto	+ 2' 08"
8	Niklas Axelsson (SWE)	Navigare–Gaerne	+ 2' 09"
9	Andrea Noè (ITA)	Mapei–Quick-Step	+ 2' 23"
10	José María Jiménez (ESP)	Banesto	+ 2' 43"

== Rest day ==
28 May 1999

== Stage 14 ==
29 May 1999 — Bra to Borgo San Dalmazzo, 187 km (116 mi)

Stage 14 result

Rank	Rider	Team	Time
1	Paolo Savoldelli (ITA)	Saeco–Cannondale	5h 22' 13"
2	Marco Pantani (ITA)	Mercatone Uno–Bianchi	+ 1' 47"
3	Daniel Clavero (ESP)	Vitalicio Seguros	s.t.
4	Ivan Gotti (ITA)	Team Polti	s.t.
5	Richard Virenque (FRA)	Team Polti	+ 3' 28"
6	Andrei Zintchenko (RUS)	Vitalicio Seguros	s.t.
7	Pietro Caucchioli (ITA)	Amica Chips–Costa de Almeria	s.t.
8	Hernán Buenahora (COL)	Vitalicio Seguros	s.t.
9	Cristiano Frattini (ITA)	Liquigas	s.t.
10	Roberto Heras (ESP)	Kelme–Costa Blanca	s.t.

Stage 14 result

Rank	Rider	Team	Time
1	Marco Pantani (ITA)	Mercatone Uno–Bianchi	63h 14' 00"
2	Paolo Savoldelli (ITA)	Saeco–Cannondale	+ 53"
3	Ivan Gotti (ITA)	Team Polti	+ 1' 21"
4	Daniel Clavero (ESP)	Vitalicio Seguros	+ 1' 22"
5	Laurent Jalabert (FRA)	ONCE–Deutsche Bank	+ 1' 45"
6	Serhiy Honchar (UKR)	Vini Caldirola	+ 3' 47"
7	Niklas Axelsson (SWE)	Navigare–Gaerne	+ 3' 54"
8	Gilberto Simoni (ITA)	Ballan–Alessio	+ 5' 01"
9	Oscar Camenzind (SUI)	Lampre–Daikin	+ 5' 18"
10	Roberto Sgambelluri (ITA)	Cantina Tollo–Alexia Alluminio	+ 6' 13"

== Stage 15 ==
30 May 1999 — Racconigi to Santuario di Oropa, 143 km (89 mi)

Stage 15 result

Rank	Rider	Team	Time
1	Marco Pantani (ITA)	Mercatone Uno–Bianchi	3h 47' 31"
2	Laurent Jalabert (FRA)	ONCE–Deutsche Bank	+ 21"
3	Gilberto Simoni (ITA)	Ballan–Alessio	+ 35"
4	Ivan Gotti (ITA)	Team Polti	+ 38"
5	Daniel Clavero (ESP)	Vitalicio Seguros	s.t.
6	Nicola Miceli (ITA)	Liquigas	+ 44"
7	Paolo Savoldelli (ITA)	Saeco–Cannondale	+ 49"
8	Andrei Zintchenko (RUS)	Vitalicio Seguros	+ 54"
9	Daniele De Paoli (ITA)	Amica Chips–Costa de Almeria	+ 56"
10	Davide Rebellin (ITA)	Team Polti	+ 57"

Stage 15 result

Rank	Rider	Team	Time
1	Marco Pantani (ITA)	Mercatone Uno–Bianchi	67h 01' 19"
2	Paolo Savoldelli (ITA)	Saeco–Cannondale	+ 1' 54"
3	Laurent Jalabert (FRA)	ONCE–Deutsche Bank	+ 2' 10"
4	Ivan Gotti (ITA)	Team Polti	+ 2' 11"
5	Daniel Clavero (ESP)	Vitalicio Seguros	+ 2' 12"
6	Serhiy Honchar (UKR)	Vini Caldirola	+ 5' 40"
7	Gilberto Simoni (ITA)	Ballan–Alessio	+ 5' 44"
8	Niklas Axelsson (SWE)	Navigare–Gaerne	+ 6' 08"
9	Oscar Camenzind (SUI)	Lampre–Daikin	+ 6' 27"
10	Daniele De Paoli (ITA)	Amica Chips–Costa de Almeria	+ 7' 58"

== Stage 16 ==
31 May 1999 — Biella to Lumezzane, 232 km (144 mi)

Stage 16 result

Rank	Rider	Team	Time
1	Laurent Jalabert (FRA)	ONCE–Deutsche Bank	5h 51' 36"
2	Marco Pantani (ITA)	Mercatone Uno–Bianchi	s.t.
3	Gilberto Simoni (ITA)	Ballan–Alessio	s.t.
4	Roberto Heras (ESP)	Kelme–Costa Blanca	+ 3"
5	Marco Velo (ITA)	Mercatone Uno–Bianchi	s.t.
6	Davide Rebellin (ITA)	Team Polti	s.t.
7	Oscar Camenzind (SUI)	Lampre–Daikin	s.t.
8	Paolo Savoldelli (ITA)	Saeco–Cannondale	s.t.
9	Giuseppe Di Grande (ITA)	Mapei–Quick-Step	s.t.
10	Nicola Miceli (ITA)	Liquigas	+ 6"

Stage 16 result

Rank	Rider	Team	Time
1	Marco Pantani (ITA)	Mercatone Uno–Bianchi	72h 52' 47"
2	Paolo Savoldelli (ITA)	Saeco–Cannondale	+ 2' 05"
3	Laurent Jalabert (FRA)	ONCE–Deutsche Bank	+ 2' 06"
4	Ivan Gotti (ITA)	Team Polti	+ 2' 33"
5	Daniel Clavero (ESP)	Vitalicio Seguros	+ 2' 43"
6	Gilberto Simoni (ITA)	Ballan–Alessio	+ 5' 48"
7	Serhiy Honchar (UKR)	Vini Caldirola	+ 5' 57"
8	Niklas Axelsson (SWE)	Navigare–Gaerne	+ 6' 25"
9	Oscar Camenzind (SUI)	Lampre–Daikin	+ 6' 38"
10	Daniele De Paoli (ITA)	Amica Chips–Costa de Almeria	+ 8' 18"

== Stage 17 ==
1 June 1999 — Lumezzane to Castelfranco Veneto, 212 km (132 mi)

Stage 17 result

Rank	Rider	Team	Time
1	Mario Cipollini (ITA)	Saeco–Cannondale	5h 42' 49"
2	Matteo Tosatto (ITA)	Ballan–Alessio	s.t.
3	Dario Pieri (ITA)	Navigare–Gaerne	s.t.
4	Serguei Smetanine (RUS)	Vitalicio Seguros	s.t.
5	Massimo Strazzer (ITA)	Mobilvetta Design–Northwave	s.t.
6	Jeroen Blijlevens (NED)	TVM–Farm Frites	s.t.
7	Alessandro Petacchi (ITA)	Navigare–Gaerne	s.t.
8	Gabriele Missaglia (ITA)	Lampre–Daikin	s.t.
9	Biagio Conte (ITA)	Liquigas	s.t.
10	Miguel Ángel Martín Perdiguero (ESP)	ONCE–Deutsche Bank	s.t.

Stage 17 result

Rank	Rider	Team	Time
1	Marco Pantani (ITA)	Mercatone Uno–Bianchi	78h 35' 36"
2	Paolo Savoldelli (ITA)	Saeco–Cannondale	+ 2' 05"
3	Laurent Jalabert (FRA)	ONCE–Deutsche Bank	+ 2' 06"
4	Ivan Gotti (ITA)	Team Polti	+ 2' 33"
5	Daniel Clavero (ESP)	Vitalicio Seguros	+ 2' 43"
6	Gilberto Simoni (ITA)	Ballan–Alessio	+ 5' 48"
7	Serhiy Honchar (UKR)	Vini Caldirola	+ 5' 57"
8	Niklas Axelsson (SWE)	Navigare–Gaerne	+ 6' 25"
9	Oscar Camenzind (SUI)	Lampre–Daikin	+ 6' 38"
10	Daniele De Paoli (ITA)	Amica Chips–Costa de Almeria	+ 8' 18"

== Stage 18 ==
2 June 1999 — Treviso to Treviso, 45 km (28 mi) (ITT)

Stage 18 result

Rank	Rider	Team	Time
1	Serhiy Honchar (UKR)	Vini Caldirola	52' 55"
2	Paolo Savoldelli (ITA)	Saeco–Cannondale	+ 17"
3	Laurent Jalabert (FRA)	ONCE–Deutsche Bank	+ 41"
4	Martin Hvastija (SLO)	Ballan–Alessio	+ 42"
5	Marco Velo (ITA)	Mercatone Uno–Bianchi	+ 57"
6	Niklas Axelsson (SWE)	Navigare–Gaerne	+ 1' 29"
7	Marco Pantani (ITA)	Mercatone Uno–Bianchi	+ 1' 38"
8	Víctor Hugo Peña (COL)	Vitalicio Seguros	+ 1' 41"
9	Andrei Zintchenko (RUS)	Vitalicio Seguros	+ 1' 50"
10	Ivan Gotti (ITA)	Team Polti	+ 2' 17"

Stage 18 result

Rank	Rider	Team	Time
1	Marco Pantani (ITA)	Mercatone Uno–Bianchi	79h 30' 09"
2	Paolo Savoldelli (ITA)	Saeco–Cannondale	+ 44"
3	Laurent Jalabert (FRA)	ONCE–Deutsche Bank	+ 1' 09"
4	Ivan Gotti (ITA)	Team Polti	+ 3' 12"
5	Serhiy Honchar (UKR)	Vini Caldirola	+ 4' 19"
6	Daniel Clavero (ESP)	Vitalicio Seguros	+ 4' 47"
7	Niklas Axelsson (SWE)	Navigare–Gaerne	+ 6' 16"
8	Gilberto Simoni (ITA)	Ballan–Alessio	+ 7' 22"
9	Andrei Zintchenko (RUS)	Vitalicio Seguros	+ 8' 33"
10	Marco Velo (ITA)	Mercatone Uno–Bianchi	+ 9' 10"

== Stage 19 ==
3 June 1999 — Castelfranco Veneto to Alpe di Pampeago, 166 km (103 mi)

Stage 19 result

Rank	Rider	Team	Time
1	Marco Pantani (ITA)	Mercatone Uno–Bianchi	5h 13' 15"
2	Gilberto Simoni (ITA)	Ballan–Alessio	+ 1' 07"
3	Roberto Heras (ESP)	Kelme–Costa Blanca	+ 1' 27"
4	Ivan Gotti (ITA)	Team Polti	+ 1' 29"
5	Daniele De Paoli (ITA)	Amica Chips–Costa de Almeria	+ 1' 54"
6	Oscar Camenzind (SUI)	Lampre–Daikin	+ 2' 32"
7	Roberto Sgambelluri (ITA)	Cantina Tollo–Alexia Alluminio	s.t.
8	Paolo Savoldelli (ITA)	Saeco–Cannondale	+ 2' 46"
9	Niklas Axelsson (SWE)	Navigare–Gaerne	+ 2' 52"
10	Óscar Sevilla (ESP)	Kelme–Costa Blanca	+ 2' 54"

Stage 19 result

Rank	Rider	Team	Time
1	Marco Pantani (ITA)	Mercatone Uno–Bianchi	84h 43' 12"
2	Paolo Savoldelli (ITA)	Saeco–Cannondale	+ 3' 42"
3	Ivan Gotti (ITA)	Team Polti	+ 4' 53"
4	Laurent Jalabert (FRA)	ONCE–Deutsche Bank	+ 5' 24"
5	Daniel Clavero (ESP)	Vitalicio Seguros	+ 7' 58"
6	Gilberto Simoni (ITA)	Ballan–Alessio	+ 8' 33"
7	Niklas Axelsson (SWE)	Navigare–Gaerne	+ 9' 20"
8	Serhiy Honchar (UKR)	Vini Caldirola	+ 11' 49"
9	Roberto Sgambelluri (ITA)	Cantina Tollo–Alexia Alluminio	+ 12' 05"
10	Andrei Zintchenko (RUS)	Vitalicio Seguros	+ 12' 26"

== Stage 20 ==
4 June 1999 — Predazzo to Madonna di Campiglio, 175 km (109 mi)

Stage 20 result

Rank	Rider	Team	Time
1	Marco Pantani (ITA)	Mercatone Uno–Bianchi	4h 39' 58"
2	Massimo Codol (ITA)	Lampre–Daikin	+ 1' 07"
3	Laurent Jalabert (FRA)	ONCE–Deutsche Bank	s.t.
4	Gilberto Simoni (ITA)	Ballan–Alessio	s.t.
5	Ivan Gotti (ITA)	Team Polti	s.t.
6	Hernán Buenahora (COL)	Vitalicio Seguros	s.t.
7	Roberto Heras (ESP)	Kelme–Costa Blanca	s.t.
8	Oscar Camenzind (SUI)	Lampre–Daikin	+ 1' 29"
9	Daniele De Paoli (ITA)	Amica Chips–Costa de Almeria	s.t.
10	Niklas Axelsson (SWE)	Navigare–Gaerne	s.t.

Stage 20 result

Rank	Rider	Team	Time
1	Marco Pantani (ITA)	Mercatone Uno–Bianchi	89h 22' 58"
2	Paolo Savoldelli (ITA)	Saeco–Cannondale	+ 5' 38"
3	Ivan Gotti (ITA)	Team Polti	+ 6' 12"
4	Laurent Jalabert (FRA)	ONCE–Deutsche Bank	+ 6' 39"
5	Daniel Clavero (ESP)	Vitalicio Seguros	+ 9' 51"
6	Gilberto Simoni (ITA)	Ballan–Alessio	+ 9' 52"
7	Niklas Axelsson (SWE)	Navigare–Gaerne	+ 11' 01"
8	Serhiy Honchar (UKR)	Vini Caldirola	+ 13' 30"
9	Roberto Sgambelluri (ITA)	Cantina Tollo–Alexia Alluminio	+ 14' 00"
10	Roberto Heras (ESP)	Kelme–Costa Blanca	+ 14' 07"

== Stage 21 ==
5 June 1999 — Madonna di Campiglio to Aprica, 190 km (120 mi)

Stage 21 result

Rank	Rider	Team	Time
1	Roberto Heras (ESP)	Kelme–Costa Blanca	5h 57' 07"
2	Gilberto Simoni (ITA)	Ballan–Alessio	s.t.
3	Ivan Gotti (ITA)	Team Polti	s.t.
4	Paolo Savoldelli (ITA)	Saeco–Cannondale	+ 4' 05"
5	Laurent Jalabert (FRA)	ONCE–Deutsche Bank	+ 4' 45"
6	Serhiy Honchar (UKR)	Vini Caldirola	s.t.
7	Daniele De Paoli (ITA)	Amica Chips–Costa de Almeria	s.t.
8	Niklas Axelsson (SWE)	Navigare–Gaerne	s.t.
9	Richard Virenque (FRA)	Team Polti	+ 6' 19"
10	Oscar Mason (ITA)	Liquigas	+ 8' 05"

Stage 21 result

Rank	Rider	Team	Time
1	Ivan Gotti (ITA)	Team Polti	95h 26' 13"
2	Paolo Savoldelli (ITA)	Saeco–Cannondale	+ 3' 35"
3	Gilberto Simoni (ITA)	Ballan–Alessio	+ 3' 36"
4	Laurent Jalabert (FRA)	ONCE–Deutsche Bank	+ 5' 16"
5	Roberto Heras (ESP)	Kelme–Costa Blanca	+ 7' 47"
6	Niklas Axelsson (SWE)	Navigare–Gaerne	+ 9' 38"
7	Serhiy Honchar (UKR)	Vini Caldirola	+ 12' 07"
8	Daniele De Paoli (ITA)	Amica Chips–Costa de Almeria	+ 14' 20"
9	Daniel Clavero (ESP)	Vitalicio Seguros	+ 15' 53"
10	Roberto Sgambelluri (ITA)	Cantina Tollo–Alexia Alluminio	+ 17' 31"

== Stage 22 ==
6 June 1999 — Darfo Boario Terme to Milan, 170 km (110 mi)

Stage 22 result

Rank	Rider	Team	Time
1	Fabrizio Guidi (ITA)	Team Polti	4h 29' 43"
2	Dario Pieri (ITA)	Navigare–Gaerne	s.t.
3	Massimo Strazzer (ITA)	Mobilvetta Design–Northwave	s.t.
4	Serguei Smetanine (RUS)	Vitalicio Seguros	s.t.
5	Samuele Schiavina (ITA)	Riso Scotti–Vinavil	s.t.
6	Mariano Piccoli (ITA)	Lampre–Daikin	s.t.
7	Andreas Klier (GER)	TVM–Farm Frites	s.t.
8	Gian Matteo Fagnini (ITA)	Saeco–Cannondale	s.t.
9	Ángel Edo (ESP)	Kelme–Costa Blanca	s.t.
10	Chann McRae (USA)	Mapei–Quick-Step	s.t.

Stage 22 result

Rank	Rider	Team	Time
1	Ivan Gotti (ITA)	Team Polti	99h 55' 56"
2	Paolo Savoldelli (ITA)	Saeco–Cannondale	+ 3' 35"
3	Gilberto Simoni (ITA)	Ballan–Alessio	+ 3' 36"
4	Laurent Jalabert (FRA)	ONCE–Deutsche Bank	+ 5' 16"
5	Roberto Heras (ESP)	Kelme–Costa Blanca	+ 7' 47"
6	Niklas Axelsson (SWE)	Navigare–Gaerne	+ 9' 38"
7	Serhiy Honchar (UKR)	Vini Caldirola	+ 12' 07"
8	Daniele De Paoli (ITA)	Amica Chips–Costa de Almeria	+ 14' 20"
9	Daniel Clavero (ESP)	Vitalicio Seguros	+ 15' 53"
10	Roberto Sgambelluri (ITA)	Cantina Tollo–Alexia Alluminio	+ 17' 31"
