= 1998 Tour de Langkawi =

Race details
- Dates: 18 February–1 March 1998
- Stages: 12
- Distance: 1,835.7 km (1,140.7 mi)
- Winning time: 45h 12' 50"

Results
| Jersey awarded to the overall winner | Winner | Gabriele Missaglia (ITA) | (Mapei–Bricobi) |
| | Second | Giuliano Figueras (ITA) | (Mapei–Bricobi) |
| | Third | Niklas Axelsson (SWE) | (Scrigno–Gaerne) |
| Jersey awarded to the points classification winner | Points | Fred Rodriguez (USA) | (Saturn) |
| Jersey awarded to the mountains classification winner | Mountains | Douglas Ryder (RSA) | (South Africa) |
| | Team | Mapei–Bricobi | |

The 1998 Tour de Langkawi was the third edition of the Tour de Langkawi, a cycling stage race that took place in Malaysia. It started on 18 February in Langkawi and ended on 1 March in Kuala Lumpur. The race was sanctioned by the Union Cycliste Internationale (UCI) as a 2.5 category race.

Italian Gabriele Missaglia won the race, Giuliano Figueras second and Niklas Axelsson third. Fred Rodriguez also won the points classification and Douglas Ryder won the mountains classification of the race. Mapei–Bricobi won the team classification of the race.

== Stages ==
The cyclist competed in 12 stages over 12 days, covering a distance of 1,835.7 kilometres.

| Stage | Date | Course | Distance | Stage result | | |
| Stage | Date | Course | Distance | Winner | Second | Third |
|---|---|---|---|---|---|---|
| 1 | 18 February | Langkawi Individual time trial | 17.7 km (11.0 mi) | Andrea Tafi (ITA) | Brian Walton (CAN) | Niklas Axelsson (SWE) |
| 2 | 19 February | Kangar to George Town | 181.5 km (112.8 mi) | Fred Rodriguez (USA) | Andrea Tafi (ITA) | Mirko Rossato (ITA) |
| 3 | 20 February | Gerik to Kota Bharu | 223 km (138.6 mi) | Roberto Gaggioli (ITA) | Søren Petersen (DEN) | Gabriele Missaglia (ITA) |
| 4 | 21 February | Kota Bharu to Kuala Terengganu | 165.1 km (102.6 mi) | Mirko Rossato (ITA) | Eric Wohlberg (CAN) | Marcel Renggli (SUI) |
| 5 | 22 February | Kuala Terengganu to Kuantan | 202.4 km (125.8 mi) | Fred Rodriguez (USA) | Peter Rogers (AUS) | Gabriele Missaglia (ITA) |
| 6 | 23 February | Kuantan to Mersing | 196.8 km (122.3 mi) | Alessandro Petacchi (ITA) | Andres Lauk (EST) | Jacob Rasmussen (DEN) |
| 7 | 24 February | Johor Bahru to Muar | 176.3 km (109.5 mi) | Chad Gerlach (USA) | Peter Rogers (AUS) | Carlo Jasul (PHI) |
| 8 | 25 February | Malacca to Port Dickson | 128.7 km (80.0 mi) | Dario Pieri (ITA) | Scott Fortner (USA) | Matthew Wilson (AUS) |
| 9 | 26 February | Port Dickson to Sunway Lagoon | 189.9 km (118.0 mi) | Mirko Rossato (ITA) | Roberto Gaggioli (ITA) | Luca Cei (ITA) |
| 10 | 27 February | Sabak Bernam to Ipoh | 137.7 km (85.6 mi) | Chad Gerlach (USA) | Marcin Gebka (POL) | Frank McCormack (USA) |
| 11 | 28 February | Tanjung Malim to Genting Highlands | 147 km (91.3 mi) | Giuliano Figueras (ITA) | Gabriele Missaglia (ITA) | Andrew McClean (RSA) |
| 12 | 1 March | Kuala Lumpur Criterium | 69.6 km (43.2 mi) | Luca Cei (ITA) | Piotr Wadecki (POL) | Graeme Miller (NZL) |

== Classification leadership ==
| Stage | Stage winner | General classification | Points classification | Mountains classification | Asian rider classification | Team classification | Asian team classification |
|---|---|---|---|---|---|---|---|
| 1 | Andrea Tafi | Andrea Tafi | Andrea Tafi | not available | Tang Xuezhong | Saturn | China |
| 2 | Fred Rodriguez | Andrea Tafi | Andrea Tafi | Chad Gerlach | Tang Xuezhong | Saturn | Malaysia |
| 3 | Roberto Gaggioli | Andrea Tafi | Andrea Tafi | Andrew McClean | Tang Xuezhong | Mapei–Bricobi | Malaysia |
| 4 | Mirko Rossato | Andrea Tafi | Fred Rodriguez | Andrew McClean | Tang Xuezhong | Mapei–Bricobi | Malaysia |
| 5 | Fred Rodriguez | Andrea Tafi | Fred Rodriguez | Allan Iacoune | Tang Xuezhong | Mapei–Bricobi | Malaysia |
| 6 | Alessandro Petacchi | Andrea Tafi | Fred Rodriguez | Allan Iacoune | Tang Xuezhong | Mapei–Bricobi | Malaysia |
| 7 | Chad Gerlach | Andrea Tafi | Fred Rodriguez | Allan Iacoune | Tang Xuezhong | Mapei–Bricobi | Malaysia |
| 8 | Dario Pieri | Andrea Tafi | Fred Rodriguez | Allan Iacoune | Tang Xuezhong | Mapei–Bricobi | Malaysia |
| 9 | Mirko Rossato | Andrea Tafi | Fred Rodriguez | Douglas Ryder | Tang Xuezhong | Mapei–Bricobi | Malaysia |
| 10 | Chad Gerlach | Andrea Tafi | Fred Rodriguez | Douglas Ryder | Tang Xuezhong | Oilme-Klein | Malaysia |
| 11 | Giuliano Figueras | Gabriele Missaglia | Fred Rodriguez | Douglas Ryder | Tonton Susanto | Mapei–Bricobi | Philippines |
| 12 | Luca Cei | Gabriele Missaglia | Fred Rodriguez | Douglas Ryder | Tonton Susanto | Mapei–Bricobi | Philippines |
| Final | | Gabriele Missaglia | Fred Rodriguez | Douglas Ryder | Tonton Susanto | Mapei–Bricobi | Philippines |

== Final standings ==
=== General classification ===
| | Rider | Team | Time |
|---|---|---|---|
| 1 | Gabriele Missaglia (ITA) | Mapei–Bricobi | 45h 12' 50" |
| 2 | Giuliano Figueras (ITA) | Mapei–Bricobi | + 26" |
| 3 | Niklas Axelsson (SWE) | Scrigno–Gaerne | + 01' 25" |
| 4 | Andrew McClean (RSA) | South Africa | + 02' 19" |
| 5 | Andrea Tafi (ITA) | Mapei–Bricobi | + 02' 37" |
| 6 | Stig Guldbaek (DEN) | Denmark | + 02' 38" |
| 7 | Fred Rodriguez (USA) | Saturn | + 03' 18" |
| 8 | Allan Iacoune (AUS) | Australia | + 04' 25" |
| 9 | Piotr Wadecki (POL) | Mróz | + 05' 06" |
| 10 | Andrey Mizurov (KAZ) | Kazakhstan | + 06' 39" |

=== Points classification ===
| | Rider | Team | Points |
|---|---|---|---|
| 1 | Fred Rodriguez (USA) | Saturn | 117 |
| 2 | Andres Lauk (EST) | Tuul Tunturi | 86 |
| 3 | Mirko Rossato (ITA) | Scrigno–Gaerne | 83 |
| 4 | Roberto Gaggioli (ITA) | Oilme-Klein | 74 |
| 5 | Eddy Gragus (USA) | Oilme-Klein | 71 |
| 6 | Chad Gerlach (USA) | Oilme-Klein | 62 |
| 7 | Søren Petersen (DEN) | Denmark | 58 |
| 8 | Gabriele Missaglia (ITA) | Mapei–Bricobi | 54 |
| 9 | Andrea Tafi (ITA) | Mapei–Bricobi | 50 |
| 10 | Arne Hohenstein (GER) | Agro-Adler | 47 |

=== Mountains classification ===
| | Rider | Team | Points |
|---|---|---|---|
| 1 | Douglas Ryder (RSA) | South Africa | 43 |
| 2 | Ole Sigurd Simensen (NOR) | Agro-Adler | 40 |
| 3 | Giuliano Figueras (ITA) | Mapei–Bricobi | 35 |
| 4 | Mohamad Fauzi Shafihi (MAS) | Malaysia | 35 |
| 5 | Allan Iacoune (AUS) | Australia | 32 |
| 6 | Gabriele Missaglia (ITA) | Mapei–Bricobi | 23 |
| 7 | Franz Hotz (SUI) | Post Swiss Team | 21 |
| 8 | Raymond Clarke (IRL) | Republic of Ireland | 20 |
| 9 | Tomasz Brożyna (POL) | Mróz | 16 |
| 10 | Niklas Axelsson (SWE) | Scrigno–Gaerne | 12 |

=== Asian rider classification ===
| | Rider | Team | Time |
|---|---|---|---|
| 1 | Tonton Susanto (INA) | Indonesia | 45h 34' 42" |
| 2 | Tang Xuezhong (CHN) | China | + 01' 18" |
| 3 | Arnel Quirimit (PHI) | Philippines | + 03' 36" |
| 4 | Victor Espiritu (PHI) | Philippines | + 04' 39" |
| 5 | Ma Yajun (CHN) | China | + 06' 20" |
| 6 | Tsen Seong Hoong (MAS) | Malaysia | + 08' 10" |
| 7 | Murugayan Kumaresan (MAS) | Malaysia | + 11' 39" |
| 8 | Shahrulneeza Razali (MAS) | Malaysia | + 14' 40" |
| 9 | Chung Chee Wai (MAS) | Malaysia B | + 19' 49" |
| 10 | Carlo Jasul (PHI) | Philippines | + 22' 07" |

=== Team classification ===
| | Team | Time |
|---|---|---|
| 1 | Mapei–Bricobi | 135h 41' 28" |
| 2 | Saturn | + 19' 42" |
| 3 | South Africa | + 22' 23" |
| 4 | Denmark | + 23' 45" |
| 5 | Lada Cska Samara | + 39' 14" |
| 6 | Oilme-Klein | + 41' 11" |
| 7 | Mróz | + 58' 37" |
| 8 | Scrigno–Gaerne | + 59' 22" |
| 9 | Australia | + 01h 07' 23" |
| 10 | Philippines | + 01h 17' 38" |

=== Asian team classification ===
| | Team | Time |
|---|---|---|
| 1 | Philippines | 136h 59' 06" |
| 2 | Malaysia | + 08' 04" |
| 3 | China | + 25' 20" |
| 4 | Malaysia B | + 01h 08' 27" |
| 5 | Indonesia | + 01h 19' 46" |
