= 2000 Züri-Metzgete =

2000 UCI Road World Cup

Race details
- Dates: 20 August 2000
- Stages: 1
- Distance: 248.4 km (154.3 mi)
- Winning time: 6h 07' 21"

Results
	Winner	Laurent Dufaux (SUI)	(Saeco–Valli & Valli)
	Second	Jan Ullrich (GER)	(Team Telekom)
	Third	Francesco Casagrande (ITA)	(Vini Caldirola–Sidermec)

The 2000 Züri-Metzgete was the 85th edition of the Züri-Metzgete road cycling one day race. It was held on 20 August 2000 as part of the 2000 UCI Road World Cup. The race was won by Laurent Dufaux of Switzerland.

== Result ==
Rank	Rider	Team	Time
1	Laurent Dufaux (SUI)	Saeco–Valli & Valli	6h 07' 21"
2	Jan Ullrich (GER)	Team Telekom	s.t.
3	Francesco Casagrande (ITA)	Vini Caldirola–Sidermec	s.t.
4	Davide Rebellin (ITA)	Liquigas–Pata	+ 1' 03"
DSQ	~~Lance Armstrong (USA)~~	U.S. Postal Service	s.t.
6	Óscar Freire (ESP)	Mapei–Quick-Step	+ 1' 19"
7	Oscar Camenzind (SUI)	Lampre–Daikin	s.t.
8	Andrey Kivilev (KAZ)	AG2R Prévoyance	+ 4' 28"
9	(Italy) Daniele De Paoli	Lotto–Adecco	+ 4' 51"
10	Romāns Vainšteins (LAT)	Vini Caldirola–Sidermec	+ 4' 58"
