= 2003 Paris–Roubaix =

- Official event poster with previous winner Johan Museeuw

Race details
- Dates: April 13, 2003
- Stages: 1
- Distance: 261 km (162.2 mi)
- Winning time: 6h 11' 35"

Results
	Winner	Peter Van Petegem (BEL)	(Lotto–Domo)
	Second	Dario Pieri (ITA)	(Saeco)
	Third	Viatcheslav Ekimov (RUS)	(U.S. Postal Service)

The 2003 Paris–Roubaix was the 101st running of the Paris–Roubaix single-day cycling race, often known as the Hell of the North. It was held on 13 April 2003 over a distance of 261 kilometres (162.2 miles). These are the results for the 2003 edition of the Paris–Roubaix cycling classic, in which Peter Van Petegem entered history by doing the double with his Tour of Flanders win, 26 years after Roger De Vlaeminck. This edition was run under clear skies and relatively good weather.

== Results ==
13-04-2003: Compiègne–Roubaix, 261 km (162.2 mi).

Results (1–10)
	Cyclist	Team	Time
1	Peter Van Petegem (BEL)	Lotto–Domo	6h 11'35"
2	Dario Pieri (ITA)	Saeco	s.t.
3	Viatcheslav Ekimov (RUS)	U.S. Postal Service	s.t.
4	Marc Wauters (BEL)	Rabobank	+ 15"
5	Andrea Tafi (ITA)	Team CSC	+ 36"
6	Romāns Vainšteins (LAT)	Vini Caldirola–So.di	+ 36"
7	Servais Knaven (NED)	Quick-Step–Davitamon	+ 36"
8	Daniele Nardello (ITA)	Team Telekom	+ 36"
9	Rolf Aldag (GER)	Team Telekom	+ 36"
10	Serguei Ivanov (RUS)	Fassa Bortolo	+ 1' 08"
