= 2003 Züri-Metzgete =

2003 UCI Road World Cup

Race details
- Dates: 17 August 2003
- Stages: 1
- Distance: 236.6 km (147.0 mi)
- Winning time: 5h 55' 30"

Results
	Winner	Daniele Nardello (ITA)	(Team Telekom)
	Second	Jan Ullrich (GER)	(Team Bianchi)
	Third	Paolo Bettini (ITA)	(Quick-Step–Davitamon)

The 2003 Züri-Metzgete was the 88th edition of the Züri-Metzgete road cycling one day race. It was held on 17 August 2003 as part of the 2003 UCI Road World Cup. The race was won by Daniele Nardello of Italy.

== Result ==
Rank	Rider	Team	Time
1	Daniele Nardello (ITA)	Team Telekom	5h 55' 30"
2	Jan Ullrich (GER)	Team Bianchi	+ 6"
3	Paolo Bettini (ITA)	Quick-Step–Davitamon	+ 11"
4	Michael Boogerd (NED)	Rabobank	s.t.
5	Davide Rebellin (ITA)	Gerolsteiner	s.t.
6	Javier Pascual Rodríguez (ESP)	iBanesto.com	s.t.
7	Oscar Camenzind (SUI)	Phonak	s.t.
8	David Moncoutié (FRA)	Cofidis	s.t.
9	Michele Scarponi (ITA)	Domina Vacanze–Elitron	s.t.
10	Cristian Moreni (ITA)	Alessio	s.t.
