= Chad Gerlach =

American cyclist

Personal information
- Born: July 13, 1973 (age 53) Sacramento, California, U.S.

Cycling career
- Sport: Cycling
- Current team: Retired
- Discipline: Road
- Role: Rider

Professional teams
- 1995–1996: U.S. Postal Service
- 1997: Plymouth–Ellsworth
- 1997: Navigators
- 1998: Oilme–Klein
- 2002: Sierra Nevada–Cannondale
- 2009: Amore & Vita–McDonald's

Chad Gerlach (born July 13, 1973) is an American former professional road cyclist.

Seen as a promising talent in the late 1990s and early 2000s, Gerlach rode for major teams including U.S. Postal Service and Navigators, before turning to drugs and alcohol and becoming homeless in 2003. He gained notoriety for his comeback to professional cycling in 2009 after suffering from addiction for approximately five years, which was featured on Intervention.

== Major results ==
1996
1st Nevada City Classic
1st Stage 1 Course de la Solidarité Olympique
1st Stage 7 Tour of China
1st Stage 4 Killington Stage Race
7th Binche–Tournai–Binche
1997
3rd Nevada City Classic
1998
1st Stages 7 & 10 Tour de Langkawi
2009
5th Nevada City Classic
