= Eddy Gragus =

American cyclist (born 1968)

Personal information
- Full name: Eddy Gragus
- Born: February 15, 1968 (age 58) Cleveland, Ohio, U.S.
- Height: 5 ft 8 in (173 cm)
- Weight: 145 lb (66 kg)

Cycling career
- Sport: Cycling
- Discipline: Road
- Role: Rider
- Rider type: All-rounder

Amateur team
- c. 1986–1994: –

Professional teams
- 1995: Montgomery Bell Professional Cycling Team
- 1996: U.S. Postal Service Pro Cycling Team
- 1997: U.S. Postal Service Pro Cycling Team
- 1999: Ikon-Lexus
- 2000-2001: Jelly Belly
- 2002: Sierra Nevada

Major wins
- 1994 - Tour of Yugoslavia; 1996 - USPRO National Road Race Championships; 1996 - a stage on the Tour of Poland; 1996 - a stage on the Tour of China; 1999 - USPRO Saturn Tour; 2003 - Descente Boulder Criterium

Eddy Gragus (born February 15, 1968, in Cleveland, Ohio) is a former professional cyclist. In 1994 he won the Tour of Yugoslavia as an amateur. In 1996 he won the USPRO National Road Race Championships, and a stage on the Tour of China. In 1999 he won the USPRO Saturn Tour. He raced professionally for the Montgomery Bell Professional Cycling Team and U.S. Postal Service Pro Cycling Team among others.

== Amateur Cycling career ==
Eddy began racing bicycles during his senior year in high school in Tampa, Florida. In 1991, aged 22, he moved to France and raced as an elite amateur throughout Europe. In 1994 he won the Tour of Yugoslavia.

== Professional career ==
Eddy turned professional in 1995 with the Montgomery Bell Professional Cycling Team under his formative coach, Eddie Borysewicz. In his first year as a professional he won the second stage of the Tour of Poland, holding the leaders jersey until the penultimate stage when a crash left him 10th on the GC. In 1996 the team changed title sponsors and became the U.S. Postal Service Pro Cycling Team, which subsequently became known as the Discovery Channel Pro Cycling Team. In his second year as a professional Eddy won the biggest one-day event on the US Professional calendar, the USPRO National Road Race Championships in Philadelphia, PA. He also won a stage on the Tour of China. Outside Magazine Online ran daily journal entries from Eddy's first grand tour, the 1997 Vuelta a España - (See below).

Eddy raced for US Postal for 1997 and went on to race for several other Professional teams such as Oil-Me, Ikon-Lexus, Jelly Belly and Sierra Nevada. In 1999 he won the USPRO Saturn Tour.

In 2003 he won the Descente Boulder Criterium with the Trek-VW team.

== Major results ==
1995

- 1st TT Stage Tour of Poland
- KOM CoreState USPRO Road Championship (100 mile solo breakaway)
- 10th Tour of Poland (held leaders jersey for six stages)

1996

- 1st CoreState US Pro Championship
- KOM Thrift Drug Classic
- 4th CoreState Trenton Classic

1997

- KOM Circuit de la Sarthe (France)
- 1st Stage Redlands Classic

1998

- 4th(x2) Stage Tour de Lankawi

1999

- 1st Saturn USPRO Tour
- 1st Stage Fitchburg Longjo Stage Race
- 2nd GC Fitchburg Longjo Stage Race
- 2nd First Union Trenton CLassic
- Member of US World Championship National Team (Verona, Italy)

2000

- 2nd GC Sea Otter Classic Stage Race

== Personal life ==
Since retirement Eddy has married, has two kids and become a Corporate Tax Manager (with focus on transfer pricing) and resides in Colorado.
