= 2000 HEW Cyclassics =

Race details
- Dates: 6 August 2000
- Stages: 1
- Distance: 250.8 km (155.8 mi)
- Winning time: 6h 17' 22"

Results
	Winner	Gabriele Missaglia (ITA)
	Second	Francesco Casagrande (ITA)
	Third	Fabio Baldato (ITA)

The 2000 HEW Cyclassics was the fifth edition of the HEW Cyclassics cycle race and was held on 6 August 2000. The race started and finished in Hamburg. The race was won by Gabriele Missaglia.

== General classification ==
Final general classification

	Cyclist	Team	Time
1	Gabriele Missaglia (ITA)	Lampre–Daikin	6h 17' 22"
2	Francesco Casagrande (ITA)	Vini Caldirola–Sidermec	s.t.
3	Fabio Baldato (ITA)	Fassa Bortolo	+ 2"
4	Erik Zabel (GER)	Team Telekom	s.t.
5	Thor Hushovd (NOR)	Crédit Agricole	s.t.
6	Gabriele Balducci (ITA)	Fassa Bortolo	s.t.
7	Marco Zanotti (ITA)	Liquigas–Pata	s.t.
8	Massimiliano Mori (ITA)	Saeco–Valli & Valli	s.t.
9	Magnus Bäckstedt (SWE)	Crédit Agricole	s.t.
10	Romāns Vainšteins (LAT)	Vini Caldirola–Sidermec	s.t.
