= PostalWatch Incorporated =

American nonprofit organization

PostalWatch Incorporated is a Virginia not-for-profit organization formed to "protect individuals and the small business community from" United States Postal Service actions and regulations which they deem "intrusive and burdensome". It fought against an initiative by the postal service to forbid people and companies who receive mail through a commercial mail receiving agency such as Mailboxes Etc. from listing their private mail box number as a suite rather than a PMB in their mailing address. PostalWatch was founded in 1999.

PostalWatch's founder Richard H. Merritt died on June 18, 2006. As of July 18, 2006, the PostalWatch website's homepage featured only a picture of Merritt, the announcement of his death from cancer, and a thank you from the family. The site seemed to offer no further functionality.
