= Luca Cei =

Italian cyclist

Personal information
- Born: 7 May 1975 (age 51) Pietrasanta, Italy

Cycling career
- Sport: Cycling
- Current team: Retired
- Discipline: Road
- Role: Rider

Professional team
- 1998–2000: Scrigno–Gaerne

Luca Cei (born 7 May 1975 in Pietrasanta) is an Italian former racing cyclist.

== Major results ==
1997
1st La Popolarissima
1998
1st Stage 12 Tour de Langkawi
9th Gran Premio della Costa Etruschi
1999
1st Stage 12 Tour de Langkawi
