= Angelo Lopeboselli =

Italian cyclist

Personal information
- Born: 10 April 1977 (age 49) Gavardo, Italy

Cycling career
- Sport: Cycling
- Current team: Retired
- Discipline: Road
- Role: Rider

Professional teams
- 2000–2003: Cofidis
- 2004: LPR–Piacenza

Angelo Lopeboselli (born 10 April 1977, in Gavardo) is an Italian former cyclist. His biggest result was at the 2003 Giro di Lombardia, where he finished second. He also competed in the 2003 Vuelta a España, finishing 90th overall.

== Major results ==
1997
3rd Overall Giro della Valle d'Aosta
1998
1st Stage 6 Giro della Valle d'Aosta
1999
2nd Overall Girobio

1st Stages 7 & 9

8th Under-23 Road race, World Road Championships
2000
7th Overall GP du Midi Libre
2002
7th Grand Prix de Wallonie
2003
2nd Giro di Lombardia
3rd Giro del Piemonte
9th Overall Settimana Internazionale Coppi e Bartali
