= 2003 Giro di Lombardia =

Race details
- Dates: 18 October 2003
- Stages: 1
- Distance: 249 km (154.7 mi)
- Winning time: 6h 29' 41"

Results
	Winner	Michele Bartoli (ITA)	(Fassa Bortolo)
	Second	Angelo Lopeboselli (ITA)	(Cofidis)
	Third	Dario Frigo (ITA)	(Fassa Bortolo)

The 2003 Giro di Lombardia was the 97th edition of the Giro di Lombardia cycle race and was held on 18 October 2003. The race started in Como and finished in Bergamo. The race was won by Michele Bartoli of the Fassa Bortolo team.

== General classification ==
Final general classification
Rank	Rider	Team	Time
1	Michele Bartoli (ITA)	Fassa Bortolo	6h 29' 41"
2	Angelo Lopeboselli (ITA)	Cofidis	+ 2"
3	Dario Frigo (ITA)	Fassa Bortolo	+ 1' 31"
4	Beat Zberg (SUI)	Rabobank	+ 1' 47"
5	Miguel Ángel Martín Perdiguero (ESP)	Domina Vacanze–Elitron	+ 1' 47"
6	Cédric Vasseur (FRA)	Cofidis	+ 1' 47"
7	Serhiy Honchar (UKR)	De Nardi–Colpack	+ 1' 47"
8	Patrik Sinkewitz (GER)	Quick-Step–Davitamon	+ 1' 47"
9	Guido Trentin (ITA)	Cofidis	+ 1' 47"
10	Michael Boogerd (NED)	Rabobank	+ 1' 47"
