= Niklas Axelsson =

Swedish cyclist

Personal information
- Full name: Niklas Axelsson
- Born: 15 May 1972 (age 54) Mora, Sweden
- Height: 1.80 m (5 ft 11 in)
- Weight: 73 kg (161 lb)

Cycling career
- Sport: Cycling
- Discipline: Road
- Role: Rider

Professional teams
- 1998–2000: Scrigno–Gaerne
- 2001: Mercury–Viatel
- 2001: Alessio
- 2004: Formaggi Pinzolo Fiavè
- 2005: Universal Caffé–Styloffice
- 2006–2008: Selle Italia–Diquigiovanni
- 2009: Team Utensilnord

Niklas Axelsson (born 15 May 1972) is a Swedish former professional road racing cyclist. Axelsson finished sixth during the 1999 Giro d'Italia and third in the 2000 edition of Giro di Lombardia. He is banned from sports for life for doping.

== Doping ==
Axelsson tested positive for EPO in the 2001 UCI Road World Championships in Lisbon and later admitted his guilt. He was suspended for four years by the Swedish Cycling Federation (SCF) but made an early comeback in 2004. He was diagnosed with testicular cancer in 2007 but made a complete recovery.

In 2010 it was found that his September 2009 A sample was positive for EPO. On 7 July 2010, the B sample was deemed positive and the Swedish Cycling Federation suspended Axelsson for life.

== Major results ==
1990
1st Road race, National Junior Road Championships
1992
3rd Overall Flèche du Sud
1995
1st Stage 9 Rapport Toer
6th Overall Peace Race
1998
3rd Overall Tour de Langkawi
7th Overall Vuelta a Aragon
1999
National Road Championships

3rd Road race
3rd Time trial

4th Milano–Torino
6th Overall Giro d'Italia
6th Coppa Sabatini
2000
2nd Overall Giro del Trentino
3rd Giro di Lombardia
3rd Scandinavian Open Time Trial
5th Time trial, National Road Championships
2001
2nd Road race, National Road Championships
4th GP de Fourmies
7th Overall Tour de Wallonie

1st Stage 6

8th Overall Tour de Langkawi
9th Giro di Lombardia
10th GP du canton d'Argovie
2004
9th Firenze–Pistoia
2006
2nd Giro di Romagna
8th GP Industria Artigianato e Commercio Carnaghese
2007
3rd GP Industria Artigianato e Commercio Carnaghese
4th GP Nobili Rubinetterie
2008
2nd Road race, National Road Championships
3rd Overall Vuelta a La Rioja
4th Overall Settimana internazionale di Coppi e Bartali

1st Stage 2

4th GP Triberg-Schwarzwald
5th Overall Tirreno–Adriatico
7th Monte Paschi Eroica
9th Overall Giro della Provincia di reggio Calabria
10th Tour du Finistère
2009
7th Overall Tour of Qinghai Lake
8th GP Costa Degli Etruschi

== See also ==
- List of doping cases in cycling
