= Gabriele Missaglia =

Italian cyclist

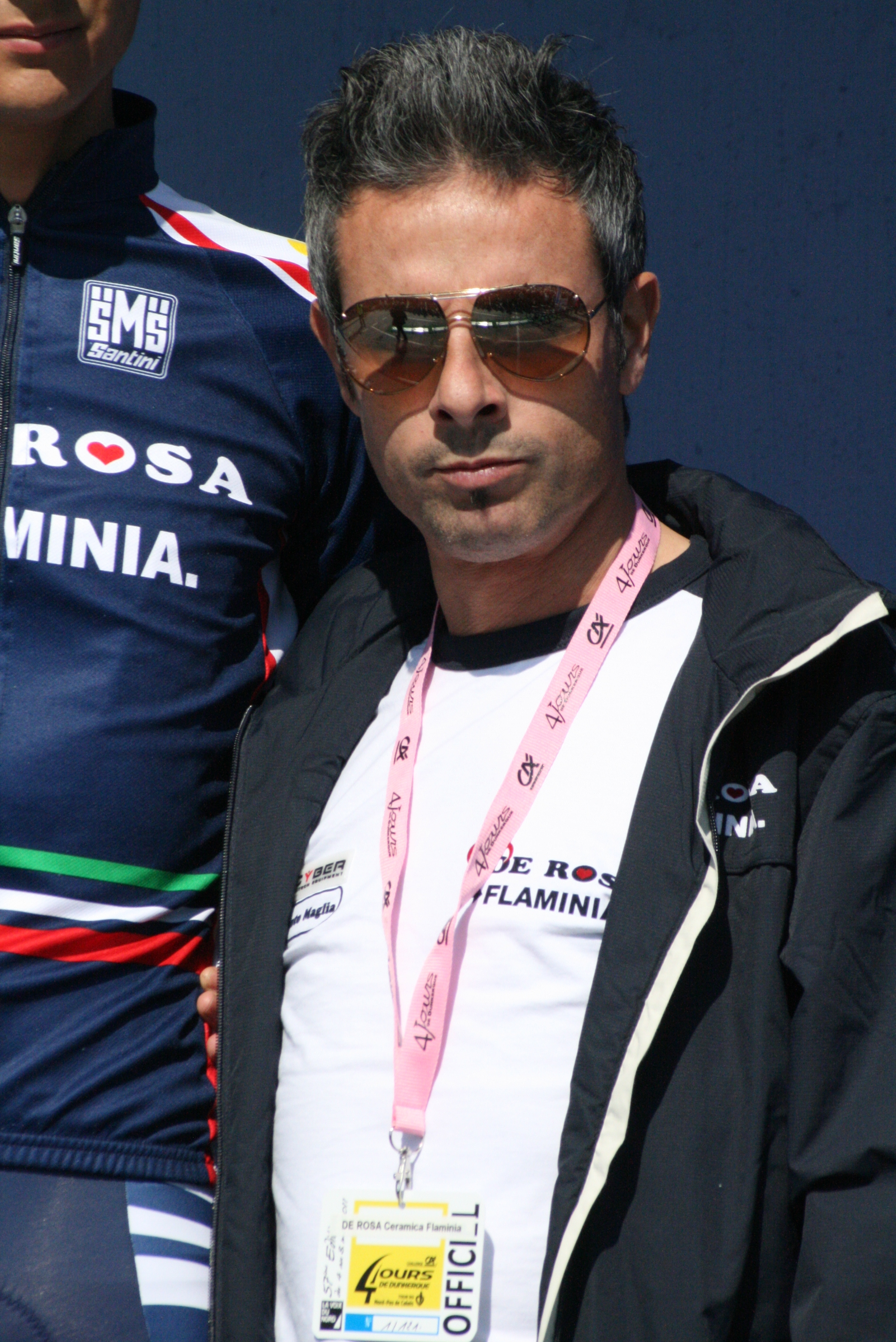

Personal information
- Full name: Gabriele Missaglia
- Born: 24 July 1970 (age 56) Inzago, Italy

Cycling career
- Sport: Cycling
- Current team: Pinarello–Q36.5 Pro Cycling Team
- Discipline: Road
- Role: Rider; Directeur sportif
- Rider type: Puncheur

Professional teams
- 1994: Brescialat–Ceramiche Refin (stagiaire)
- 1995: Brescialat–Fago
- 1996: San Marco Group–Fago
- 1996: Panaria–Vinavil
- 1997–1998: Mapei–GB
- 1999–2003: Lampre–Daikin
- 2004: Barloworld
- 2005: Team Universal Caffè–Styloffice
- 2006–2008: Selle Italia–Diquigiovanni

Major wins
- Grand Tours Giro d'Italia 1 individual stage (1997) Stage races Tour de Langkawi (1998) Tour of Qinghai Lake (2007) One-day races and Classics HEW Cyclassics (2000)

Gabriele Missaglia (born 24 July 1970 in Inzago) is an Italian former professional road bicycle racer. He currently works as a directeur sportif for UCI ProTeam Pinarello–Q36.5 Pro Cycling Team.

== Major results ==
1994
2nd GP Industria Artigianato e Commercio Carnaghese
1995
3rd Coppa Bernocchi
4th Giro dell'Emilia
5th GP du canton d'Argovie
10th Paris–Tours
10th Giro di Romagna
1997
1st Stage 11 Giro d'Italia
1st Stage 1 Tour of the Basque Country
4th Overall Giro di Sardegna
4th Trofeo Melinda
1998
1st Overall Tour de Langkawi
5th Tre Valli Varesine
1999
1st Stage 3 Tour de Suisse
2nd GP du canton d'Argovie
3rd Amstel Gold Race
4th Veenendaal–Veenendaal
9th Giro dell'Appennino
10th Overall Tour de Romandie
2000
1st HEW Cyclassics
1st Stage 4 Volta a Catalunya
2nd Japan Cup
2nd GP Industria & Commercio di Prato
5th Luk-Cup Bühl
7th GP Città di Camaiore
7th Coppa Agostoni
9th Coppa Sabatini
2002
2nd GP Città di Camaiore
3rd Milano–Torino
3rd Clásica de San Sebastián
8th Tour of Flanders
9th Overall Vuelta a Murcia
10th GP Industria & Commercio di Prato
2003
10th GP Città di Camaiore
2004
4th Rund um die Hainleite
7th Giro del Lazio
10th Overall Tour du Languedoc-Rousillon
2005
6th Coppa Agostoni
7th Coppa Placci
8th Giro di Romagna
8th GP Industria & Commercio di Prato
2006
3rd Overall Tour de Langkawi
5th Coppa Placci
5th Giro del Veneto
10th GP Industria & Commercio di Prato
2007
1st Overall Tour of Qinghai Lake
2008
7th Overall Tour of Turkey

=== Grand Tour general classification results timeline ===
Grand Tour	1996	1997	1998	1999	2000	2001	2002	2003	2004	2005	2006	2007	2008
Giro d'Italia	57	53	41	16	45	60	72	—	—	—	106	—	71
Tour de France	—	—	—	—	—	—	—	—	—	—	—	—	—
Vuelta a España	—	—	—	DNF	—	—	—	—	—	—	—	—	—

Legend
—	Did not compete
DNF	Did not finish
