= Daniele Nardello =

Italian cyclist

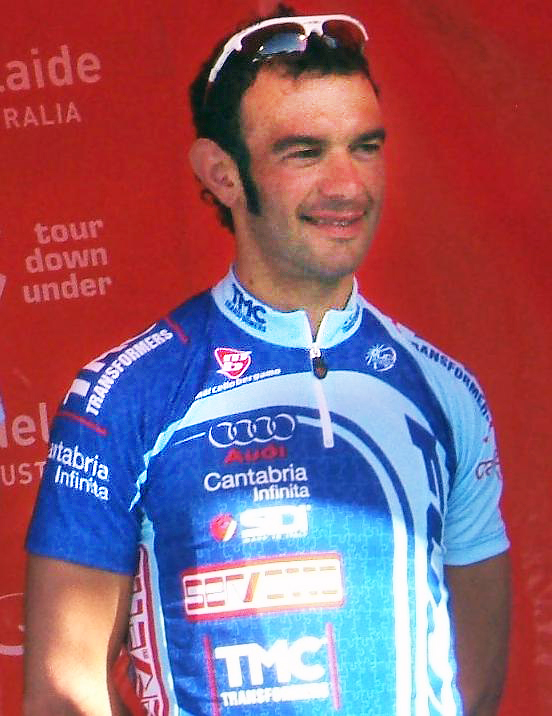

Personal information
- Full name: Daniele Nardello
- Born: 2 August 1972 (age 54) Varese, Italy
- Height: 1.81 m (5 ft 11 1/2 in)
- Weight: 73 kg (161 lb; 11 st 7 lb)

Cycling career
- Sport: Cycling
- Discipline: Road
- Role: Rider
- Rider type: Classics

Professional teams
- 1994–2002: Mapei–CLAS
- 2003–2006: Team Telekom
- 2007: Team LPR
- 2008: Diquigiovanni–Androni
- 2009: Fuji–Servetto

Managerial teams
- 2010: Footon–Servetto–Fuji
- 2011: Geox–TMC
- 2012: GreenEDGE

Major wins
- Grand Tours Tour de France 1 individual stage (1998) Vuelta a España 1 individual stages (1996, 1999) Single-day races and Classics National Road Race Championships (2001) Züri-Metzgete (2003) Milano–Torino (1996) Trofeo Laigueglia (2000)

Daniele Nardello (born 2 August 1972 in Varese) is a retired Italian professional road racing cyclist. His career ran from 1994 to 2009, with highlights including winning the 2001 Italian national road race championship, the 2003 Züri-Metzgete, and three straight top-10 finishes and one stage win at the Tour de France.

== Career achievements ==
=== Major results ===
1990
1st Road race, National Junior Road Championships
4th Road race, UCI Road World Championships
1994
2nd Overall Herald Sun Tour
1995
1st Paris–Bourges
2nd Giro di Lombardia
5th Overall Tour DuPont
7th GP Rik Van Steenbergen
1996
1st Milano–Torino
1st Grand Prix d'Europe (with Fabio Roscioli)
1st Stage 12 Vuelta a España
4th Time trial, UCI Road World Championships
4th Giro di Lombardia
5th Overall Circuit de la Sarthe

1st Stage 1

5th Trofeo Melinda
6th Japan Cup
7th Tre Valli Varesine
9th Giro del Piemonte
1997
1st Overall Tour of Austria

1st Stages 1 & 7

2nd Trofeo Matteotti
2nd Giro dell'Appennino
7th Overall Tour de Suisse
7th Tour de Berne
8th Wincanton Classic
8th Tre Valli Varesine
1998
2nd Road race, National Road Championships
2nd Overall Grand Prix Guillaume Tell

1st Stage 3

2nd Japan Cup
2nd Giro del Piemonte
3rd Coppa Bernocchi
4th Giro del Lazio
5th Clásica de San Sebastián
6th Paris–Brussels
7th GP Industria & Commercio di Prato
7th Tre Valli Varesine
8th Overall Tour de France

1st Stage 13

9th Overall Tour of Austria
9th Paris–Bourges
1999
1st Paris–Bourges
1st Stage 11 Vuelta a España
3rd Time trial, National Road Championships
3rd Brabantse Pijl
7th Overall Tour de France
9th Amstel Gold Race
10th Road race, UCI Road World Championships
2000
1st Overall Circuit Franco-Belge
1st Tour du Haut Var
1st Trofeo Laigueglia
1st Duo Normand (with László Bodrogi)
3rd Road race, National Road Championships
3rd Paris–Tours
4th Josef Voegeli Memorial
4th Grand Prix d'Europe
6th Grand Prix Eddy Merckx
7th Overall Tour de Suisse
9th Overall Tour of Austria

1st Stage 5

10th Overall Tour de France
10th Overall Tour Méditerranéen
10th Omloop Het Volk
2001
1st Road race, National Road Championships
1st Tour du Haut Var
1st Stage 7 Tour of Austria
2nd Giro di Romagna
2nd Trofeo Laigueglia
3rd Danmark Rundt
4th Overall Tour Down Under
4th Trofeo Melinda
5th Tour of Flanders
5th Coppa Placci
6th Omloop Het Volk
8th Gent–Wevelgem
9th Classic Haribo
10th Brabantse Pijl
2002
1st Coppa Bernocchi
2nd Gran Premio Bruno Beghelli
3rd Overall Tour de la Region Wallonne
4th Trofeo Melinda
4th Giro di Romagna
4th Tour du Haut Var
5th Overall Tour Down Under
5th Tour of Flanders
2003
1st Overall Rheinland-Pfalz Rundfahrt

1st Stage 2

1st Züri-Metzgete
1st Stage 5 Hessen Rundfahrt
8th Paris–Roubaix
2004
2nd GP Fred Mengoni
4th GP Industria & Commercio di Prato
5th Giro di Lombardia
2005
5th Overall Danmark Rundt
9th LuK Challenge
2007
2nd GP de Fourmies
3rd Giro del Veneto
6th GP Nobili Rubinetterie

=== Grand Tour general classification results timeline ===
Grand Tour	1995	1996	1997	1998	1999	2000	2001	2002	2003	2004	2005	2006	2007	2008
Giro d'Italia	53	DNF	—	—	—	—	—	42	—	—	DNF	—	—	46
Tour de France	—	—	18	8	7	10	57	—	25	48	55	—	—	—
Vuelta a España	—	15	DNF	—	23	—	—	—	—	—	44	55	—	—

Legend
—	Did not compete
DNF	Did not finish
