= U.S. Postal Service Pro Cycling Team =

US-based professional road bicycle racing team

U.S. Postal Service Pro Cycling Team Discovery Channel Pro Cycling Team

Team information
- UCI code: DSC
- Registered: United States
- Founded: 1988
- Disbanded: 2007
- Discipline: Road
- Status: UCI ProTeam (2005–2007)

Key personnel
- General manager: Bill Stapleton
- Team manager: Johan Bruyneel

Team name history
- 1988–1989 1992–1994 1995 1996–2003 2004 2005–2007: Sunkyong (Amateur); Subaru–Montgomery; Montgomery–Bell; U.S. Postal Service; U.S. Postal Service–Discovery Channel; Discovery Channel
U.S. Postal Service Pro Cycling Team jersey
Jersey

U.S. Postal Service Pro Cycling Team was a United States–based professional road bicycle racing team. On June 15, 2004, the Discovery Channel signed a deal to become sponsor of the team for the 2004–2007 seasons and its name changed to Discovery Channel Pro Cycling Team (UCI team code: DSC). From 2005 until 2007, the team was one of the 20 teams that competed in the new UCI ProTour. As part of the sponsorship deal, Lance Armstrong, the team's undisputed leader, provided on-air appearances for the Discovery Networks TV channels. The deal did not affect the rights of secondary sponsor OLN, later known as NBCSN in the US, to air major cycling events such as the Tour de France, although the two channels are competitors.

The team was directed by Belgian Johan Bruyneel, who also managed U.S. Postal. The chief mechanic was Julien DeVries. The team was co-owned by Tailwind Sports Corp. of San Francisco and Capital Sports & Entertainment of Austin, Texas. On February 10, 2007, Discovery Channel announced that it would not renew its sponsorship of the team at the end of the 2007 season. On August 10, 2007, the cycling team announced that it would not search for a new sponsor, but cease operations and disband at the end of the 2007 season.

In October 2012 USADA released a report saying that the team had run "the most sophisticated, professionalised and successful doping programme the sport has ever seen". The report contained affidavits from eleven riders on the team including Frankie Andreu, Tyler Hamilton, George Hincapie, Floyd Landis, Levi Leipheimer, and others, describing their own usage of erythropoietin (EPO), blood transfusion, testosterone, and other banned practices during the Tour de France and other races. They also implicated seven-time Tour winner, Lance Armstrong. On October 22, 2012, the UCI upheld the USADA's recommendation to strip Armstrong of all results since August 1, 1998, and ban him from cycling for life. In February 2013, the US government joined Landis' False Claims Act lawsuit against Armstrong, alleging that Armstrong had defrauded the US Postal Service of sponsorship funds by violating cycling rules by using performance-enhancing drugs while riding for the team.

== Team rosters ==
=== Final season ===
On August 10, 2007, Tailwind Sports announced the end of the Discovery Channel Pro Cycling Team. Tailwind officials stopped their search for a new title sponsor for the Discovery team, citing the current tumultuous conditions within the sport of cycling. Team operations continued until the end of the 2007 season.

After the 2007 season Johan Bruyneel went to rebuild Team Astana for the 2008 season. He brought with him much of Discovery's personnel, such as riders Alberto Contador, Levi Leipheimer, Yaroslav Popovych, Tomas Vaitkus, and coach Sean Yates.

The 2007 U.S. national road champion George Hincapie signed a contract for the 2008 season Team High Road, later known as Team HTC–Columbia, run by the American Bob Stapleton.

=== Final squad (2007) ===
As of April 30, 2007. Ages are from August 10, 2007.

Rider	Date of birth
Fumiyuki Beppu (JPN)	April 10, 1983 (aged 24)
Volodymyr Bileka (UKR)	February 6, 1979 (aged 28)
Janez Brajkovič (SLO)	December 18, 1983 (aged 23)
Alberto Contador (ESP)	December 6, 1982 (aged 24)
Antonio Cruz (USA)	October 31, 1971 (aged 35)
Steve Cummings (GBR)	March 19, 1981 (aged 26)
Tom Danielson (USA)	March 13, 1978 (aged 29)
Allan Davis (AUS)	July 27, 1980 (aged 27)
John Devine (USA) (From July 2007)	November 2, 1985 (aged 21)
Stijn Devolder (BEL)	August 29, 1979 (aged 27)
Vladimir Gusev (RUS)	July 4, 1982 (aged 25)
George Hincapie (USA)	June 29, 1973 (aged 34)
Levi Leipheimer (USA)	October 24, 1973 (aged 33)
Fuyu Li (CHN)	May 9, 1978 (aged 29)

Rider	Date of birth
Trent Lowe (AUS)	October 8, 1984 (aged 22)
Egoi Martínez (ESP)	May 15, 1978 (aged 29)
Jason McCartney (USA)	September 3, 1973 (aged 33)
Gianni Meersman (BEL)	December 5, 1985 (aged 21)
Uroš Murn (SLO)	February 9, 1975 (aged 32)
Benjamín Noval (ESP)	January 23, 1979 (aged 28)
Pavel Padrnos (CZE)	December 17, 1970 (aged 36)
Sérgio Paulinho (POR)	March 26, 1980 (aged 27)
Yaroslav Popovych (UKR)	January 4, 1980 (aged 27)
José Luis Rubiera (ESP)	January 27, 1973 (aged 34)
Tomas Vaitkus (LTU)	February 4, 1982 (aged 25)
Jurgen Van Goolen (BEL)	November 28, 1980 (aged 26)
Brian Vandborg (DEN)	December 4, 1981 (aged 25)
Matt White (AUS)	February 22, 1974 (aged 33)

=== Former members of Discovery Channel ===
Name	Nationality	Years
Lance Armstrong	United States	2005
José Azevedo	Portugal	2005–2006
Michael Barry	Canada	2005–2006
Ivan Basso	Italy	2007
Manuel Beltrán	Spain	2005–2006
Michael Creed	United States	2005
Antonio Cruz	United States	2005
Viatcheslav Ekimov	Russia	2005–2006
Roger Hammond	United Kingdom	2005–2006
Ryder Hesjedal	Canada	2005
George Hincapie	United States	2005–2007
Leif Hoste	Belgium	2005–2006
Benoît Joachim	Luxembourg	2005–2006
Jonathan Patrick McCarty	United States	2005
Gennady Mikhaylov	Russia	2005–2006
Hayden Roulston	New Zealand	2005
Paolo Savoldelli	Italy	2005–2006
Jurgen Van den Broeck	Belgium	2005–2006
Max van Heeswijk	Netherlands	2005–2006

=== Former members of U.S. Postal ===
Name	Nationality	Years
Lance Armstrong	United States	1998–2004
Benoît Joachim	Luxembourg	1999–2004
Frankie Andreu	United States	1998–2000
José Azevedo	Portugal	2004
Dariusz Baranowski	Poland	1998
Michael Barry	Canada	2002–2004
Tom Boonen	Belgium	2000–2002
Jamie Burrow	United Kingdom	2000
Dylan Casey	United States	1999–2002
David Clinger	United States	2002
Michael Creed	United States	2004
Antonio Cruz	United States	2001–2004
Julian Dean	New Zealand	1999–2000
Pascal Deramé	France	1998–1999
Viatcheslav Ekimov	Russia	1997–1998, 2000–2004
David George	South Africa	1999–2000
Chad Gerlach	United States	1996
Eddy Gragus	United States	1995–1997
Tyler Hamilton	United States	1996–2000
Andrew Hampsten	United States	1996
Roberto Heras	Spain	2001–2003
Ryder Hesjedal	Canada	2004
George Hincapie	United States	1997–2004
Frank Høj	Denmark	1999
Marty Jemison	United States	1998–1999
Patrick Jonker	Australia	2000
Steffen Kjærgaard	Norway	2000–2003
Damon Kluck	United States	2003
Kenny Labbé	United States	2000–2004
Floyd Landis	United States	2002–2004
Juan Llaneras Rosello	Spain	1998
Levi Leipheimer	United States	2000–2001
Kevin Livingston	United States	1999–2000
Glenn Magnusson	Sweden	1999
Chann McRae	United States	2002
Peter Meinert-Nielsen	Denmark	1998–1999
Gianpaolo Mondini	Italy	2002
Kirk O'Bee	United States	2000
Víctor Hugo Peña	Colombia	2001–2004
Daniel Rincón	Colombia	2004
Jean-Cyril Robin	France	1997–1998
Sven Teutenberg	Germany	1998
Christian Vande Velde	United States	1998–2003
Jonathan Vaughters	United States	1998–1999
Cédric Vasseur	France	2000
Stive Vermaut	Belgium	2000
Robbie Ventura	United States	2003–2004
Anton Villatoro	Guatemala	1996–1998
Matt White	Australia	2001–2003
Dave Zabriskie	United States	2003–2004

== Notable wins ==
=== 2005 results ===
Date	Race	Location	Winner
2005	Team Classification, Hervis Tour of Austria	Austria	Discovery Channel Pro Cycling Team
2005-02-27	Kuurne–Brussels–Kuurne	Belgium	George Hincapie
2005–04	Overall, Tour of Georgia	United States	Tom Danielson
2005-05-19	Stage 11, Giro d'Italia	Italy	Paolo Savoldelli
2005-05-22	Overall, Volta a Catalunya	Spain	Yaroslav Popovych
2005-05-29	General Classification, Giro d'Italia	Italy	Paolo Savoldelli
2005-06-05	Prologue, Dauphiné Libéré	France	George Hincapie
2005-06-12	Points Classification, Dauphiné Libéré	France	Lance Armstrong
2005-06-12	Team Classification, Critérium du Dauphiné Libéré	France	Discovery Channel Pro Cycling Team
2005-06-12	Stage 7, Critérium du Dauphiné Libéré	France	George Hincapie
2005-07-05	Stage 4 (TTT) Speed record, Tour de France	France	Discovery Channel Pro Cycling Team
2005-07-17	Stage 15, Tour de France	France	George Hincapie
2005-07-20	Stage 17, Tour de France	France	Paolo Savoldelli
2005-07-24	Best Young Rider Classification, Tour de France	France	Yaroslav Popovych
2005-08-04	Stage 1, Eneco Tour of Benelux	Netherlands	Max van Heeswijk
2005-08-08	Stage 5 Eneco Tour of Benelux	Belgium	Max van Heeswijk
2005-08-28	GP Ouest-France	France	George Hincapie
2005-09-02	Stage 6, Vuelta a España	Spain	Max van Heeswijk

=== 2006 results ===
Date	Race	Location	Winner
2006	United Kingdom National Cyclo-Cross Championship	United Kingdom	Roger Hammond
2006-02-21	Stage 2, Tour of California	United States	George Hincapie
2006-02-26	Stage 5, Tour of California	United States	George Hincapie
2006-03-28	Stage 1, Three Days of De Panne	Belgium	Leif Hoste
2006-03-30	Stage 4, Three Days of De Panne	Belgium	Leif Hoste
2006-03-30	KOM, Three Days of De Panne	Belgium	Leif Hoste
2006-03-30	Overall, Three Days of De Panne	Belgium	Leif Hoste
2006-04-25	Prologue, Tour de Romandie	France	Paolo Savoldelli
2006-05-06	Prologue, Giro d'Italia	Italy	Paolo Savoldelli
2006-05-28	Combination Classification (Maglia Blu), Giro d'Italia	Italy	Paolo Savoldelli
2006-06-11	Japan National Time Trial Cycling Championship	Japan	Fumiyuki Beppu
2006-07-03	yellow jersey as leader of the general classification after stage 1, Tour de France	France	George Hincapie
2006-07-09	Overall, Tour of Austria	Austria	Tom Danielson
2006-07-14	Stage 12, Tour de France	France	Yaroslav Popovych
2006-07-23	Overall, Sachsen Tour International	Germany	Vladimir Gusev
2006-08-01	Prologue, Deutschland Tour	Germany	Vladimir Gusev
2006-08-09	Best Young Rider, Deutschland Tour	Germany	Vladimir Gusev
2006-08-20	Stage 4 (ITT), Eneco Tour of Benelux	Netherlands	George Hincapie
2006-08-27	Belgium National Time Trial Cycling Championship	Belgium	Leif Hoste
2006-09-02	United States National Road Race Cycling Championship	United States	George Hincapie
2006-09-04	Stage 1, Tour de Pologne	Poland	Max van Heeswijk
2006-09-06	Stage 11, Vuelta a España	Spain	Egoi Martínez
2006-09-13	Stage 17, Vuelta a España	Spain	Tom Danielson
2006-09-17	King of the Mountains, Vuelta a España	Spain	Egoi Martínez
2006-09-17	Team Classification, Vuelta a España	Spain	Discovery Channel
2006	Japan National Road Race Cycling Championship	Japan	Fumiyuki Beppu

=== 2007 results ===
Date	Race	Location	Winner
2007-02-15	Metas Volantes, 2007 Vuelta a Mallorca	Spain	Tomas Vaitkus
2007-02-18	Prologue, 2007 Tour of California	United States	Levi Leipheimer
2007-02-23	Stage 5 (ITT), 2007 Tour of California	United States	Levi Leipheimer
2007-02-25	Overall, 2007 Tour of California	United States	Levi Leipheimer
2007-03-02	Stage 4, 2007 Vuelta a la Comunidad Valenciana	Spain	Alberto Contador
2007-03-15	Stage 4, 2007 Paris–Nice	France	Alberto Contador
2007-03-16	Stage 5, 2007 Paris–Nice	France	Yaroslav Popovych
2007-03-18	Stage 7, 2007 Paris–Nice	France	Alberto Contador
2007-03-18	Best Young Rider, 2007 Paris–Nice	France	Alberto Contador
2007-03-18	Overall, 2007 Paris–Nice	France	Alberto Contador
2007-03-29	Stage 4, 2007 Vuelta Ciclista a Castilla y León	Spain	Alberto Contador
2007-03-30	Spanish Rider Classification, 2007 Vuelta Ciclista a Castilla y León	Spain	Alberto Contador
2007-03-30	Combination Classification, 2007 Vuelta Ciclista a Castilla y León	Spain	Alberto Contador
2007-03-30	Overall, 2007 Vuelta Ciclista a Castilla y León	Spain	Alberto Contador
2007-04-05	Stage 4 (ITT), 2007 Three Days of De Panne	Belgium	Stijn Devolder
2007-04-18	Stage 3, 2007 Tour de Georgia	United States	Gianni Meersman
2007-04-19	Stage 4 (ITT), 2007 Tour de Georgia	United States	Levi Leipheimer
2007-04-20	Stage 5, 2007 Tour de Georgia	United States	Levi Leipheimer
2007-04-22	Team Classification, 2007 Tour de Georgia	United States	Discovery Channel
2007-04-22	Best Young Rider, 2007 Tour de Georgia	United States	Janez Brajkovič
2007-04-22	Overall, 2007 Tour de Georgia	United States	Janez Brajkovič
2007-05-23	Stage 3, 2007 Volta a Catalunya	Spain	Allan Davis
2007-06-01	Stage 3 (ITT), 2007 Tour of Belgium	Belgium	Vladimir Gusev
2007-06-03	Overall, 2007 Tour of Belgium	Belgium	Vladimir Gusev
2007-06-21	Stage 6, 2007 Tour de Suisse	Switzerland	Vladimir Gusev
2007-06-24	Mountains Classification, 2007 Tour de Suisse	Switzerland	Vladimir Gusev
2007-06-29	Russia National Time Trial Cycling Championship	Russia	Vladimir Gusev
2007-07-01	Belgium National Road Race Championships	Belgium	Stijn Devolder
2007-07-12	Stage 5, 2007 Tour of Austria	Austria	Gianni Meersman
2007-07-14	Stage 1, 2007 Tour of Qinghai Lake	China	Allan Davis
2007-07-14	Stage 7 (ITT), 2007 Tour of Austria	Austria	Stijn Devolder
2007-07-15	Overall, 2007 Tour of Austria	Austria	Stijn Devolder
2007-07-16	Stage 3, 2007 Tour of Qinghai Lake	China	Allan Davis
2007-07-18	Stage 5, 2007 Tour of Qinghai Lake	China	Allan Davis
2007-07-19	Stage 6, 2007 Tour of Qinghai Lake	China	Allan Davis
2007-07-21	Stage 8, 2007 Tour of Qinghai Lake	China	José Luis Rubiera
2007-07-22	Stage 9, 2007 Tour of Qinghai Lake	China	Allan Davis
2007-07-22	Points Classification, 2007 Tour of Qinghai Lake	China	Allan Davis
2007-07-22	Stage 14, 2007 Tour de France	France	Alberto Contador
2007-07-28	Stage 19 (ITT), 2007 Tour de France	France	Levi Leipheimer
2007-07-29	Team Classification, 2007 Tour de France	France	Discovery Channel
2007-07-29	Best Young Rider, 2007 Tour de France	France	Alberto Contador
2007-07-29	General classification, 2007 Tour de France	France	Alberto Contador
2007-08-13	Stage 2, 2007 Tour de l'Ain	France	Brian Vandborg
2007-09-02	United States National Road Race Cycling Championship	United States	Levi Leipheimer
2007-09-12	Stage 2, 2007 Tour of Missouri	United States	George Hincapie
2007-09-13	Stage 3, 2007 Tour of Missouri	United States	Levi Leipheimer
2007-09-15	Stage 14, 2007 Vuelta a España	Spain	Jason McCartney
2007-09-16	Overall, 2007 Tour of Missouri	United States	George Hincapie

== U.S. Postal Service Pro Cycling Team history ==
The US Postal Service Pro Cycling Team and later named the US Postal Service Pro Cycling Team presented by Berry Floor operated from 1996 through 2004. The United States Postal Service was the title (primary) sponsor from 1996 through 2004 and the team was nicknamed the "Blue Train". Berry Floor, a Belgian flooring company, was the secondary sponsor, also known as a Presenting Sponsor. Domestically the USPS Pro Cycling Team was presented by Alloc, the American subsidiary of Berry Floor.

Lance Armstrong won six Tours de France (1999–2004) (that were later stripped) with US Postal, and in 2003 Roberto Heras—at that time a US Postal rider—won the Vuelta a España. Armstrong went on to win a seventh Tour de France in 2005 (that was later also stripped), after the USPS contract and sponsorship ended.

The US Postal Service announced that it would cease sponsorship at the end of the 2004 racing season when its eight-year contract expired. It had previously been under fire for the expenditure from organizations such as Postal Watch, a website critical of the United States Postal Service. Legitimate problems of mismanagement and sloppy accounting were pointed out by the Postal Service itself, via the USPS Office of the Inspector General. Before the expiration of the USPS contract, Armstrong insisted that he would only continue to ride with the USPS team structure. This demand was met on June 15, 2004, when Discovery Networks stepped in and agreed to sponsor the team for the next three years as the Discovery Channel Pro Cycling Team.

=== 1996 results ===
With the help of Thomas Weisel and Eddie Borysewicz, the United States Postal Service begins its reign as title sponsor to what has become the most successful cycling team from the United States. Borysewicz served as the team's directeur sportif and the team raced mainly in domestic events in the United States.

Date	Race	Location	Winner
1996	USPRO National Road Race Championships	United States	Eddy Gragus
1996	Stage Tour of China	United States	Eddy Gragus

=== 1997 results ===
Thomas Weisel brought in Mark Gorski, the 1984 Olympic Gold Medalist in the Men's 1000 m Sprint (Scratch) event, as team manager. Due in large part to Russian Viatcheslav Ekimov and his key stage wins at Paris–Nice and the Critérium du Dauphiné Libéré, the USPS squad got its first invitation to ride in the Tour de France.

Date	Race	Location	Winner
1997	Stage, Critérium du Dauphiné Libéré	France	Viatcheslav Ekimov
1997	Stage, Paris–Nice	France	Viatcheslav Ekimov
1997	Stage, Redlands Classic	United States	Eddy Gragus
1997	Russia National Road Race Championship	Russia	Viatcheslav Ekimov
1997	Stage, Setmana Catalana	Spain	George Hincapie

=== 1998 results ===
Lance Armstrong joined the US Postal team in late 1997, when returning to professional cycling following his cancer treatments.

Date	Race	Location	Winner
1998	(United States) USPRO National Road Race Championships	United States	George Hincapie
1998	Overall, Tour de Luxembourg	Luxembourg	Lance Armstrong
1998	Stage, Tour de Luxembourg	Luxembourg	Lance Armstrong
1998	Overall, Rheinland Pfalz	Germany	Lance Armstrong
1998	Killington (Vermont) Stage Race	United States	George Hincapie
1998	First Union Invitational (Lancaster, Pa.)	United States	Frankie Andreu

=== 1999 results ===
Date	Race	Location	Winner
1999	(United States) USPRO National Road Race Championships	United States	Marty Jemison
1999	First Union Classic (Trenton, New Jersey)	United States	George Hincapie
1999	Redlands Classic (Redlands, California)	United States	Christian Vande Velde
1999	Best Young Rider Classification, Four Days of Dunkirk	France	Christian Vande Velde

=== 2000 results ===
Date	Race	Location	Winner
2000	Grand Prix Eddy Merckx	France	Viatcheslav Ekimov

=== 2001 results ===
In 2001, the U.S. Postal Service Pro Cycling Team was named the USOC Team of the Year. Also, Armstrong was named USOC SportsMan of the Year, which he also won in 1999.

Date	Race	Location	Winner
2001-04-11	Gent–Wevelgem	Belgium	George Hincapie
2001-09	San Francisco Grand Prix	United States	George Hincapie

=== 2002 results ===
Date	Race	Location	Winner
2002-06	(United States) USPRO National Road Race Championships	United States	Chann McRae
2002-07-18	Overall, Vuelta a Murcia	Spain	Víctor Hugo Peña

=== 2003 results ===
Date	Race	Location	Winner
2003-07-09	Stage 4 (TTT), Tour de France	France	U.S. Postal Service Pro Cycling Team
2003-09-27	Stage 20, Vuelta a España	Spain	Roberto Heras
2003-09-28	Overall, Vuelta a España	Spain	Roberto Heras

=== 2004 results ===
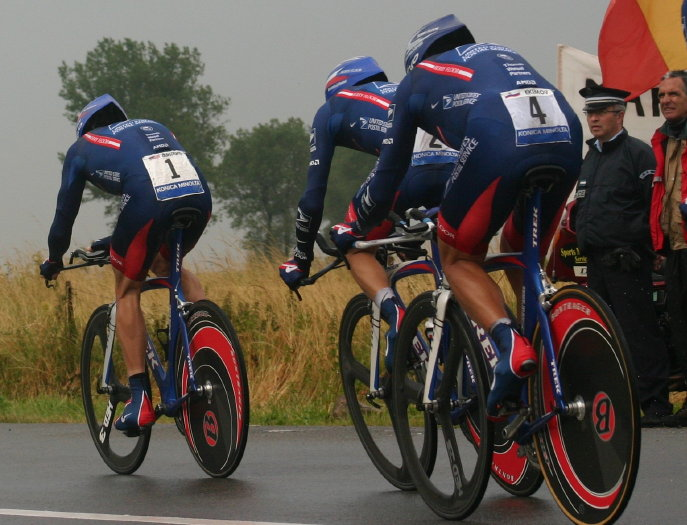
L-to-R: Armstrong, Azevedo, and Ekimov of the 2004 USPS team

Date	Race	Location	Winner
2004-04-01	Overall, Three Days of De Panne	Belgium	George Hincapie
2004-07-07	Stage 4 (TTT), Tour de France	France	U.S. Postal Service Pro Cycling Team

== Early history and notable wins ==
=== 1988–1989 – Sunkyong (Amateur) ===
Eddie Borysewicz, known as "Eddy B", was the road coach of a pro/amateur cycling team formed by George Taylor and sponsored by Sunkyong, a South Korea-based manufacturing and industrial conglomerate. At the 1984 Summer Olympics, Borysewicz served as the U.S. Olympic Cycling Coach and led American cyclists to an unprecedented nine Olympic medals.

=== 1992–1994 – Subaru–Montgomery ===
Subaru and Montgomery Securities, led by Thomas Weisel, serve as co-title sponsors.

Date	Race	Location	Winner
1990	Tour de Gastown	Canada	Jonas Carney
1991	Stage 2, Redlands Classic	United States	Jim Copeland
1991	Tour de Gastown	Canada	Lance Armstrong
1991	Stage 6, Redlands Classic	United States	Krzysztof Wiatr
1992	Herald Sun Tour	Australia	Bart Bowen
1992	USPRO National Road Race Championships	United States	Bart Bowen
1993	Stage 1, Redlands Classic	United States	Miguel Arroyo

=== 1995 – Montgomery-Bell ===
Montgomery Securities Chief Executive Thomas W. Weisel, an avid cyclist, continued his support for cycling.

Date	Race	Location	Winner
1995	Stage 8, Tour DuPont	United States	Clark Sheehan
1995	Stage 4, Tour de Pologne	Poland	Eddy Gragus

== Sponsors ==
The following companies and organizations served as sponsors for the 2007 squad:

- Discovery Channel
- AMD
- 24 Hour Fitness
- Trek
- Nike, Inc.
- Thomas Weisel Partners
- Škoda Auto
- Mio Technology Europe
- Bissell
- Bontrager
- Shimano
- Giro
- PowerBar
- Carmichael Training Systems
- 1st Endurance
- Tacx
- Hutchinson
- FRS Antioxidant Energy
- eSoles
- Park Tool USA
- Sci Con
- Sapim Race Spokes
- SRM
- Maximize
