= Dario Pieri =

Italian cyclist

Personal information
- Full name: Dario Pieri
- Born: September 1, 1975 (age 51) Florence, Italy
- Height: 1.82 m (5 ft 11 1/2 in)
- Weight: 93 kg (205 lb; 14 st 9 lb)

Cycling career
- Sport: Cycling
- Current team: Retired
- Discipline: Road
- Role: Rider
- Rider type: Classics specialist

Dario Pieri (born September 1, 1975, in Florence) is an Italian former road bicycle racer.

== Major results ==
1998
1st, Stage 1, Three Days of De Panne
1st, Stage 8, Tour de Langkawi
1999
1st, Stage 4, Tour of Slovenia
2000
2nd, Tour of Flanders
2002
1st, E3 Prijs Vlaanderen
2003
2nd, Paris–Roubaix
5th, Milan–San Remo
