= 2001 Tour de France, Prologue to Stage 10 =

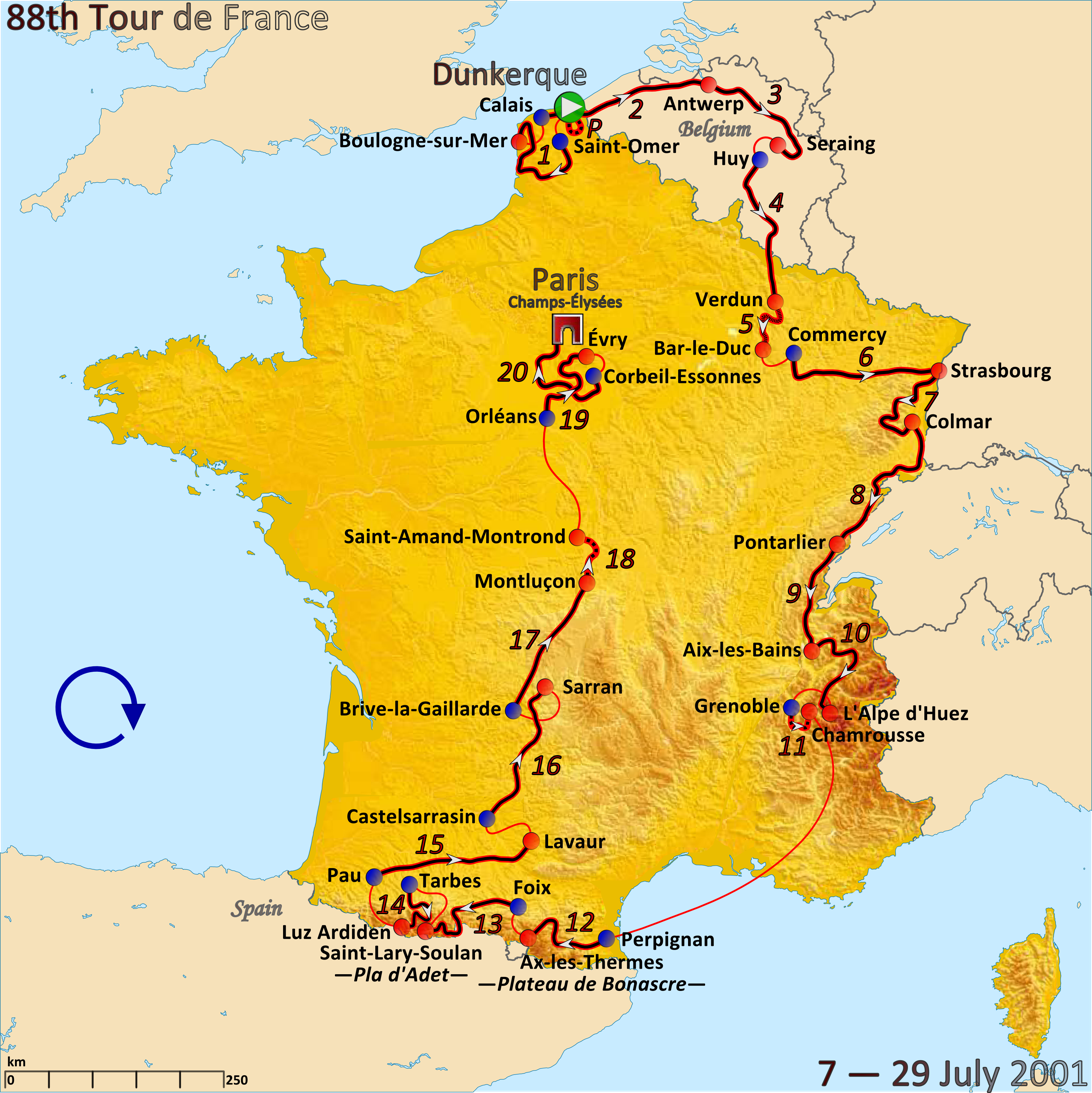
Route of the 2001 Tour de France

The 2001 Tour de France was the 88th edition of Tour de France, one of cycling's Grand Tours. The Tour began in Dunkirk with a prologue individual time trial on 7 July and Stage 10 occurred on 17 July with mountainous stage to Alpe d'Huez. The race finished on the Champs-Élysées in Paris on 29 July.

== Prologue ==
7 July 2001 — Dunkerque, 8.2 km (5.1 mi) (ITT)

One of the favorites to win the prologue, last year's winner David Millar, fell in the last curve, and thus was only 110th. Winner was Christophe Moreau, but his gains on most other favorites were small, with the exception of Casagrande, who was 120th and lost 45 seconds. Stuart O'Grady (8th) and Jaan Kirsipuu (11th) are well-placed sprinters who might gain the yellow jersey in the coming days (there are seconds 'bonification' for the riders who score high on the final or intermediate sprints)

Prologue result and general classification after prologue
Rank	Rider	Team	Time
1	Christophe Moreau (FRA)	Festina	9' 20"
2	Igor González de Galdeano (ESP)	ONCE–Eroski	+ 3"
~~3~~	~~Lance Armstrong (USA)~~ (Note: Disqualified in 2012 for doping)	~~U.S. Postal Service~~	~~+ 4"~~
4	Jan Ullrich (GER)	Team Telekom	+ 7"
5	Florent Brard (FRA)	Festina	s.t.
6	Santiago Botero (COL)	Kelme–Costa Blanca	+ 10"
7	Joseba Beloki (ESP)	ONCE–Eroski	+ 13"
8	Stuart O'Grady (AUS)	Crédit Agricole	s.t.
9	Carlos Sastre (ESP)	ONCE–Eroski	+ 14"
10	Antonio Tauler (ESP)	Kelme–Costa Blanca	s.t.

== Stage 1 ==
8 July 2001 — Saint-Omer to Boulogne-sur-Mer, 194.5 km (120.9 mi)

Frenchman Jacky Durand, well known for his attacking style, did it again. He was chased, and finally joined, by his fellow countryman Christophe Oriol. The two escapers were caught back by the peloton, but Durand had managed to be first on two small (4th category) climbs, and thus was the first wearer of the mountain jersey this Tour de France. Laurent Brochard tried to get away in the last kilometres, but in the very last kilometre was caught back. Thus, the stage became a mass sprint, won by Erik Zabel.

Stage 1 result

Rank	Rider	Team	Time
1	Erik Zabel (GER)	Team Telekom	4h 55' 15"
2	Romāns Vainšteins (LAT)	Domo–Farm Frites–Latexco	s.t.
3	Jimmy Casper (FRA)	Française des Jeux	s.t.
4	Thor Hushovd (NOR)	Crédit Agricole	s.t.
5	Jaan Kirsipuu (EST)	AG2R Prévoyance	s.t.
6	Damien Nazon (FRA)	Bonjour	s.t.
7	Steven de Jongh (NED)	Rabobank	s.t.
8	Christophe Capelle (FRA)	BigMat–Auber 93	s.t.
9	Sven Teutenberg (GER)	Festina	s.t.
10	Nico Mattan (BEL)	Cofidis	s.t.

Points classification after Stage 1

Rank	Rider	Team	Points
1	Erik Zabel (GER)	Team Telekom	35
=2	Romāns Vainšteins (LAT)	Domo–Farm Frites–Latexco	30
=2	Jaan Kirsipuu (EST)	AG2R Prévoyance	30

General classification after stage 1

Rank	Rider	Team	Time
1	Christophe Moreau (FRA)	Festina	5h 04' 35"
2	Igor González de Galdeano (ESP)	ONCE–Eroski	+ 3"
~~3~~	~~Lance Armstrong (USA)~~	~~U.S. Postal Service~~	~~+ 4"~~
4	Jaan Kirsipuu (EST)	AG2R Prévoyance	+ 7"
5	Jan Ullrich (GER)	Team Telekom	s.t.
6	Florent Brard (FRA)	Festina	s.t.
7	Santiago Botero (COL)	Kelme–Costa Blanca	+ 10"
8	Stuart O'Grady (AUS)	Crédit Agricole	+ 11"
9	Jacky Durand (FRA)	Française des Jeux	+ 13"
10	Joseba Beloki (ESP)	ONCE–Eroski	s.t.

Mountains classification after Stage 1

Rank	Rider	Team	Points
1	Jacky Durand (FRA)	Française des Jeux	10
2	Christophe Oriol (FRA)	Jean Delatour	6
3	Patrice Halgand (FRA)	Jean Delatour	2

== Stage 2 ==
9 July 2001 — Calais to Antwerp, 220.5 km (137.0 mi)

A group of 16 riders escaped from the peloton, and stayed away until the end, although with only a small difference. Because sprinter Stuart O'Grady was present, he was expected to take both the stage and the yellow jersey, but the Rabobank team had different plans. Their rider Erik Dekker, who took 3 stages in 2000, was present, and was expected to try something, but instead he helped his teammate Marc Wauters to escape. Marc got Arnaud Pretot with him, and they scored first and second. Because he also had had a good prologue, this was enough for Wauters to take the yellow as well.

Stage 2 result

Rank	Rider	Team	Time
1	Marc Wauters (BEL)	Rabobank	4h 35' 47"
2	Arnaud Prétot (FRA)	Festina	s.t.
3	Robert Hunter (RSA)	Lampre–Daikin	s.t.
4	Servais Knaven (NED)	Domo–Farm Frites–Latexco	s.t.
5	Stuart O'Grady (AUS)	Crédit Agricole	s.t.
6	Davide Bramati (ITA)	Mapei–Quick-Step	s.t.
7	Rik Verbrugghe (BEL)	Lotto–Adecco	s.t.
8	Ivan Basso (ITA)	Fassa Bortolo	s.t.
9	Marco Milesi (ITA)	Domo–Farm Frites–Latexco	s.t.
10	Erik Dekker (NED)	Rabobank	s.t.

Points classification after Stage 2

Rank	Rider	Team	Points
1	Jaan Kirsipuu (EST)	AG2R Prévoyance	45
2	Stuart O'Grady (AUS)	Crédit Agricole	43
3	Erik Zabel (GER)	Team Telekom	40

General classification after stage 2

Rank	Rider	Team	Time
1	Marc Wauters (BEL)	Rabobank	9h 40' 17"
2	Stuart O'Grady (AUS)	Crédit Agricole	+ 12"
3	Servais Knaven (NED)	Domo–Farm Frites–Latexco	+ 27"
4	Christophe Moreau (FRA)	Festina	s.t.
5	Jaan Kirsipuu (EST)	AG2R Prévoyance	+ 28"
6	Rik Verbrugghe (BEL)	Lotto–Adecco	s.t.
7	Robert Hunter (RSA)	Lampre–Daikin	+ 29"
8	Jens Voigt (GER)	Crédit Agricole	+ 30"
9	Igor González de Galdeano (ESP)	ONCE–Eroski	s.t.
10	Bobby Julich (USA)	Crédit Agricole	+ 31"

Mountains classification after Stage 2

Rank	Rider	Team	Points
1	Jacky Durand (FRA)	Française des Jeux	10
2	Christophe Oriol (FRA)	Jean Delatour	6
3	Patrice Halgand (FRA)	Jean Delatour	2

== Stage 3 ==
10 July 2001 — Antwerp to Seraing, 198.5 km (123.3 mi)

The stage seemed to be a likely prey for Erik Zabel: Some mountains (in the Ardennes), too tough for the pure sprinters, but not tough enough to really break the peloton, with a spurt going uphill. His team worked hard for him, even though this might cost them some power which they might need to help Jan Ullrich in the mountains. Marc Wauters had the honor to drive through the village where he lives ahead in the yellow, but later had to let the peloton go in the Ardennes. Apparently, the pressure got too much for him, for although he is certainly not a climber, he normally should not lose any time on a hill stage like this. Another person who lost time was Francesco Casagrande, still suffering from a broken arm he got in May. Because Wauters dropped out, Stuart O'Grady got to wear the yellow jersey after all, one day later than expected.

Stage 3 result

Rank	Rider	Team	Time
1	Erik Zabel (GER)	Team Telekom	4h 34' 32"
2	Emmanuel Magnien (FRA)	Française des Jeux	s.t.
3	Stefano Garzelli (ITA)	Mapei–Quick-Step	s.t.
4	Fabio Baldato (ITA)	Fassa Bortolo	s.t.
5	François Simon (FRA)	Bonjour	s.t.
6	Gennady Mikhaylov (RUS)	Lotto–Adecco	s.t.
7	Christophe Capelle (FRA)	BigMat–Auber 93	s.t.
8	Franck Bouyer (FRA)	Bonjour	s.t.
9	Serge Baguet (BEL)	Lotto–Adecco	s.t.
~~10~~	~~Lance Armstrong (USA)~~	~~U.S. Postal Service~~	~~s.t.~~

Points classification after Stage 3

Rank	Rider	Team	Points
1	Erik Zabel (GER)	Team Telekom	75
2	Jaan Kirsipuu (EST)	AG2R Prévoyance	47
3	Stuart O'Grady (AUS)	Crédit Agricole	45

General classification after stage 3

Rank	Rider	Team	Time
1	Stuart O'Grady (AUS)	Crédit Agricole	14h 14' 59"
2	Christophe Moreau (FRA)	Festina	+ 17"
3	Rik Verbrugghe (BEL)	Lotto–Adecco	+ 18"
4	Jens Voigt (GER)	Crédit Agricole	+ 20"
5	Igor González de Galdeano (ESP)	ONCE–Eroski	s.t.
6	Bobby Julich (USA)	Crédit Agricole	+ 21"
~~7~~	~~Lance Armstrong (USA)~~	~~U.S. Postal Service~~	~~s.t.~~
8	Erik Zabel (GER)	Team Telekom	+ 23"
9	Jan Ullrich (GER)	Team Telekom	+ 24"
10	Florent Brard (FRA)	Festina	s.t.

Mountains classification after Stage 3

Rank	Rider	Team	Points
1	Benoît Salmon (FRA)	AG2R Prévoyance	20
=2	Nicolas Jalabert (FRA)	CSC–Tiscali	10
=2	Jacky Durand (FRA)	Française des Jeux	10

== Stage 4 ==
11 July 2001 — Huy to Verdun, 215 km (133.6 mi)

Patrice Halgand was the great attacker in the first part of the stage, which gained him the mountains jersey. In the end this led to a break-away group of nine. The nine riders got up to 10 minutes ahead, but the teams of US Postal (Armstrong) and ONCE (Beloki and Gonzalez de Galdeano) started chasing, because the break-away also contained Bobby Julich and Michael Boogerd, who might well be considered dangerous outsiders. The heavy chase combined with a strong wind against caused the peloton to break. All favorites as well as yellow jersey O'Grady were in the first group, but still some riders who could well place in the top-10 were left behind. After the nine were caught, the second group could rejoin, but the combined group of about 80 riders gained 18 minutes over a lot of other riders. Laurent Jalabert, Francisco Mancebo and Ludo Dierckxsens managed to escape. Mancebo in the end was caught back, but Jalabert and Dierckxsens were just a few seconds ahead of the (first) peloton, the first winning the sprint. One favorite was lost for this year's Tour definitively, because Casagrande abandoned.

Stage 4 result

Rank	Rider	Team	Time
1	Laurent Jalabert (FRA)	CSC–Tiscali	5h 17' 49"
2	Ludo Dierckxsens (BEL)	Lampre–Daikin	s.t.
3	Damien Nazon (FRA)	Bonjour	+ 7"
4	Fred Rodriguez (USA)	Domo–Farm Frites–Latexco	s.t.
5	Alessandro Petacchi (ITA)	Fassa Bortolo	s.t.
6	Sven Teutenberg (GER)	Festina	s.t.
7	Robert Hunter (RSA)	Lampre–Daikin	s.t.
8	Stuart O'Grady (AUS)	Crédit Agricole	s.t.
9	Paul Van Hyfte (BEL)	Lotto–Adecco	s.t.
10	Sébastien Talabardon (FRA)	BigMat–Auber 93	s.t.

Points classification after Stage 4

Rank	Rider	Team	Points
1	Erik Zabel (GER)	Team Telekom	75
2	Stuart O'Grady (AUS)	Crédit Agricole	69
3	Robert Hunter (RSA)	Lampre–Daikin	49

General classification after stage 4

Rank	Rider	Team	Time
1	Stuart O'Grady (AUS)	Crédit Agricole	14h 14' 59"
2	Laurent Jalabert (FRA)	CSC–Tiscali	+ 18"
3	Christophe Moreau (FRA)	Festina	+ 23"
4	Jens Voigt (GER)	Crédit Agricole	+ 26"
5	Igor González de Galdeano (ESP)	ONCE–Eroski	s.t.
6	Bobby Julich (USA)	Crédit Agricole	+ 27"
~~7~~	~~Lance Armstrong (USA)~~	~~U.S. Postal Service~~	~~s.t.~~
8	Jan Ullrich (GER)	Team Telekom	+ 30"
9	Florent Brard (FRA)	Festina	s.t.
10	Santiago Botero (COL)	Kelme–Costa Blanca	+ 33"

Mountains classification after Stage 4

Rank	Rider	Team	Points
1	Patrice Halgand (FRA)	Jean Delatour	28
2	Benoît Salmon (FRA)	AG2R Prévoyance	26
3	Nicolas Jalabert (FRA)	CSC–Tiscali	10

== Stage 5 ==
12 July 2001 — Verdun to Bar-le-Duc, 67 km (41.6 mi) (TTT)

A team time trial, one of the hardest disciplines of cycling. The riders, going by team, have to make the fastest time for their team (fifth to arrive counts). Where it was expected that O'Grady would lose some time here on the major contestants for the general classification, his Crédit Agricole team surprised everyone by actually winning the stage. The ONCE team, considered the great favorites, placed second. Loser of the day was Jan Ullrich, who lost 30 seconds on Lance Armstrong (US Postal) and 1 minute on Joseba Beloki (ONCE). In the results the major GC contenders of each team are given between brackets. In the general classification, Crédit Agricole now takes places 1 to 3, while the rest of the top-10 are all ONCE riders except for Moreau.

Stage 5 result

Rank	Team	Time
1	Crédit Agricole	1h 21' 32"
2	ONCE–Eroski	+ 31"
3	Festina	+ 54"
4	U.S. Postal Service	+ 1' 26"
5	Kelme–Costa Blanca	+ 1' 38"
6	Rabobank	+ 1' 47"
7	Team Telekom	+ 1' 50"
8	Cofidis	+ 2' 55"
9	BigMat–Auber 93	+ 2' 56"
10	Mapei–Quick-Step	+ 2' 58"

Points classification after Stage 5

Rank	Rider	Team	Points
1	Erik Zabel (GER)	Team Telekom	75
2	Stuart O'Grady (AUS)	Crédit Agricole	69
3	Robert Hunter (RSA)	Lampre–Daikin	49

General classification after stage 5

Rank	Rider	Team	Time
1	Stuart O'Grady (AUS)	Crédit Agricole	20h 54' 21"
2	Jens Voigt (GER)	Crédit Agricole	+ 26"
3	Bobby Julich (USA)	Crédit Agricole	+ 27"
4	Igor González de Galdeano (ESP)	ONCE–Eroski	+ 57"
5	Joseba Beloki (ESP)	ONCE–Eroski	+ 1' 07"
6	Carlos Sastre (ESP)	ONCE–Eroski	+ 1' 08"
7	Jörg Jaksche (GER)	ONCE–Eroski	+ 1' 12"
8	Christophe Moreau (FRA)	Festina	+ 1' 17"
9	Iván Gutiérrez (ESP)	ONCE–Eroski	+ 1' 20"
10	Marcos-Antonio Serrano (ESP)	ONCE–Eroski	+ 1' 23"

Mountains classification after Stage 5

Rank	Rider	Team	Points
1	Patrice Halgand (FRA)	Jean Delatour	28
2	Benoît Salmon (FRA)	AG2R Prévoyance	26
3	Nicolas Jalabert (FRA)	CSC–Tiscali	10

== Stage 6 ==
13 July 2001 — Commercy to Strasbourg, 211.5 km (131.4 mi)

Little happened in this stage. A group of 5 riders (Axel Merckx, Michele Bartoli, Laurent Brochard, Rik Verbrugghe and Fred Bessy) got ahead with a maximum lead of 3 minutes, but was caught back by the joint work of Crédit Agricole and the sprint teams. The sprint was won by Estonian Jaan Kirsipuu. Belgian sprinter Tom Steels originally placed fourth, but because of 'irregular riding' during the sprint was declassified to the last place of the peloton.

Stage 6 result

Rank	Rider	Team	Time
1	Jaan Kirsipuu (EST)	AG2R Prévoyance	4h 50' 39"
2	Damien Nazon (FRA)	Bonjour	s.t.
3	Ján Svorada (CZE)	Lampre–Daikin	s.t.
4	Erik Zabel (GER)	Team Telekom	s.t.
5	Stuart O'Grady (AUS)	Crédit Agricole	s.t.
6	Jimmy Casper (FRA)	Française des Jeux	s.t.
7	Nico Mattan (BEL)	Cofidis	s.t.
8	Christophe Capelle (FRA)	BigMat–Auber 93	s.t.
9	Alexei Sivakov (RUS)	BigMat–Auber 93	s.t.
10	Romāns Vainšteins (LAT)	Domo–Farm Frites–Latexco	s.t.

Points classification after Stage 6

Rank	Rider	Team	Points
1	Erik Zabel (GER)	Team Telekom	93
2	Stuart O'Grady (AUS)	Crédit Agricole	85
3	Jaan Kirsipuu (EST)	AG2R Prévoyance	72

General classification after stage 6

Rank	Rider	Team	Time
1	Stuart O'Grady (AUS)	Crédit Agricole	25h 45' 00"
2	Jens Voigt (GER)	Crédit Agricole	+ 26"
3	Bobby Julich (USA)	Crédit Agricole	+ 27"
4	Igor González de Galdeano (ESP)	ONCE–Eroski	+ 57"
5	Joseba Beloki (ESP)	ONCE–Eroski	+ 1' 07"
6	Carlos Sastre (ESP)	ONCE–Eroski	+ 1' 08"
7	Jörg Jaksche (GER)	ONCE–Eroski	+ 1' 12"
8	Christophe Moreau (FRA)	Festina	+ 1' 17"
9	Iván Gutiérrez (ESP)	ONCE–Eroski	+ 1' 20"
10	Marcos-Antonio Serrano (ESP)	ONCE–Eroski	+ 1' 23"

Mountains classification after Stage 6

Rank	Rider	Team	Points
1	Patrice Halgand (FRA)	Jean Delatour	37
2	Laurent Brochard (FRA)	Jean Delatour	32
3	Benoît Salmon (FRA)	AG2R Prévoyance	29

== Stage 7 ==
14 July 2001 — Strasbourg to Colmar, 162.5 km (101.0 mi)

Although the Alps were not yet there, this was quite a mountainous ride through the Vosges. A breakaway group of five stayed ahead (the unlucky Basso crashing), containing German Jens Voigt, who thus took over the yellow jersey from his teammate O'Grady. Laurent Jalabert took his second stage win in this still young Tour de France - on the French national holiday, moreover.

Stage 7 result

Rank	Rider	Team	Time
1	Laurent Jalabert (FRA)	CSC–Tiscali	4h 06' 04"
2	Jens Voigt (GER)	Crédit Agricole	+ 11"
3	Laurent Roux (FRA)	Jean Delatour	s.t.
4	Íñigo Cuesta (ESP)	Cofidis	+ 13"
5	Ivan Basso (ITA)	Fassa Bortolo	+ 1' 36"
6	David Etxebarria (ESP)	Française des Jeux	+ 4' 28"
7	Alexander Vinokourov (KAZ)	Team Telekom	s.t.
8	Laurent Brochard (FRA)	Jean Delatour	s.t.
9	Matteo Tosatto (ITA)	Fassa Bortolo	s.t.
10	Franck Bouyer (FRA)	Bonjour	s.t.

Points classification after Stage 7

Rank	Rider	Team	Points
1	Erik Zabel (GER)	Team Telekom	93
2	Stuart O'Grady (AUS)	Crédit Agricole	90
3	Jaan Kirsipuu (EST)	AG2R Prévoyance	72

General classification after stage 7

Rank	Rider	Team	Time
1	Jens Voigt (GER)	Crédit Agricole	29h 51' 29"
2	Laurent Jalabert (FRA)	CSC–Tiscali	+ 2' 34"
3	Stuart O'Grady (AUS)	Crédit Agricole	+ 4' 03"
4	Bobby Julich (USA)	Crédit Agricole	+ 4' 26"
5	Igor González de Galdeano (ESP)	ONCE–Eroski	+ 5' 00"
6	Joseba Beloki (ESP)	ONCE–Eroski	+ 5' 10"
7	Carlos Sastre (ESP)	ONCE–Eroski	+ 5' 11"
8	Jörg Jaksche (GER)	ONCE–Eroski	+ 5' 15"
9	Christophe Moreau (FRA)	Festina	+ 5' 20"
10	Iván Gutiérrez (ESP)	ONCE–Eroski	+ 5' 23"

Mountains classification after Stage 7

Rank	Rider	Team	Points
1	Patrice Halgand (FRA)	Jean Delatour	60
2	Laurent Jalabert (FRA)	CSC–Tiscali	50
3	Laurent Brochard (FRA)	Jean Delatour	32

== Stage 8 ==
15 July 2001 — Colmar to Pontarlier, 222.5 km (138.3 mi)

The peloton took a day-off, but not so a group of 14 riders that had broken away. In the end they had a lead of almost 36 minutes, by far the largest one achieved in recent history. Even a lead of 22 minutes had not occurred in the last 25 years. Formally, this meant that the whole peloton finished outside the time limits, but the referees understandably used a rule that they could give clemency to any group of more than 20% of the stage's starting riders, officially citing the weather conditions as their reason to do so. Still, the effects on the general classification were huge: Stuart O'Grady, who was in the group, retook the yellow jersey, and was now over 35 minutes ahead of Armstrong. Armstrong also had to make good over half an hour on Frenchman François Simon. Perhaps even more dangerous was Andrei Kivilev. He was 'only' 13 minutes ahead of Armstrong, but unlike the others from the escape group, was known to be good in the mountains, so he needed not lose very much on the toppers in the rest of the Tour. Memories went back to 1990, when in the first stage a group of four riders won 15 minutes. One of them, Claudio Chiappucci, held on to the end, and ended second, only 2 minutes behind winner Greg Lemond.

Among the fourteen breakaways was Erik Dekker, who had won a surprising three stages in the 2000 Tour de France. In the end phase of the stage, he escaped from the group, getting joined by fellow Dutchman Servais Knaven. Spanish Aitor Gonzalez set out to bridge the gap, and succeeded; however, in doing so, he also brought Dekker's teammate Marc Wauters (who had won in Antwerp and had worn the yellow jersey for one day). With the help of Wauters, Dekker had no difficulty winning the sprint, and thus he could add a fourth Tour stage to his list of wins.

Stage 8 result

Rank	Rider	Team	Time
1	Erik Dekker (NED)	Rabobank	4h 59' 18"
2	Aitor González (ESP)	Kelme–Costa Blanca	s.t.
3	Servais Knaven (NED)	Domo–Farm Frites–Latexco	s.t.
4	Marc Wauters (BEL)	Rabobank	+ 4"
5	Stuart O'Grady (AUS)	Crédit Agricole	+ 2' 32"
6	Sven Teutenberg (GER)	Festina	s.t.
7	Jacky Durand (FRA)	Française des Jeux	s.t.
8	Bram de Groot (NED)	Rabobank	s.t.
9	Ludo Dierckxsens (BEL)	Lampre–Daikin	s.t.
10	Nicola Loda (ITA)	Fassa Bortolo	s.t.

Points classification after Stage 8

Rank	Rider	Team	Points
1	Stuart O'Grady (AUS)	Crédit Agricole	116
2	Erik Zabel (GER)	Team Telekom	103
3	Jaan Kirsipuu (EST)	AG2R Prévoyance	72

General classification after stage 8

Rank	Rider	Team	Time
1	Stuart O'Grady (AUS)	Crédit Agricole	34h 57' 18"
2	François Simon (FRA)	Bonjour	+ 4' 32"
3	Bram de Groot (NED)	Rabobank	+ 21' 16"
4	Andrey Kivilev (KAZ)	Cofidis	+ 22' 07"
5	Sven Teutenberg (GER)	Festina	+ 27' 15"
6	Jens Voigt (GER)	Crédit Agricole	+ 29' 23"
7	Ludo Dierckxsens (BEL)	Lampre–Daikin	+ 29' 49"
8	Marc Wauters (BEL)	Rabobank	+ 30' 12"
9	Ludovic Turpin (FRA)	AG2R Prévoyance	+ 30' 35"
10	Aitor González (ESP)	Kelme–Costa Blanca	+ 31' 56"

Mountains classification after Stage 8

Rank	Rider	Team	Points
1	Patrice Halgand (FRA)	Jean Delatour	60
2	Laurent Jalabert (FRA)	CSC–Tiscali	50
3	Laurent Brochard (FRA)	Jean Delatour	32

== Stage 9 ==
16 July 2001 — Pontarlier to Aix-les-Bains, 185 km (115.0 mi)

The stage started very fast, with many attacks. It was Bradley McGee and Davide Etxebarria who managed to make a gap of 1'20. Sergei Ivanov went after them and bridged the gap. The three leaders, chased by Momo Agnolutto, got a maximum of 7 minutes, but after that, the joined forces of Bonjour (of sprinter Damien Nazon) and Telekom (Zabel) quickly reduced the difference. Agnolutto was caught back, but the others managed to stay away, albeit only by a few seconds. Ivanov looked tired, and did not do his part of the work, but that appeared to be just a fake, trying to save his strength. He escaped, and went to the finish alone.

Stage 9 result

Rank	Rider	Team	Time
1	Sergei Ivanov (RUS)	Team Telekom	3h 57' 48"
2	David Etxebarria (ESP)	Euskaltel–Euskadi	+ 16"
3	Bradley McGee (AUS)	Française des Jeux	+ 17"
4	Erik Zabel (GER)	Team Telekom	+ 24"
5	Damien Nazon (FRA)	Bonjour	s.t.
6	Stuart O'Grady (AUS)	Crédit Agricole	s.t.
7	Paolo Bettini (ITA)	Mapei–Quick-Step	s.t.
8	José Enrique Gutiérrez (ESP)	Kelme–Costa Blanca	s.t.
9	Alessandro Petacchi (ITA)	Fassa Bortolo	s.t.
10	Sven Teutenberg (GER)	Festina	s.t.

Points classification after Stage 9

Rank	Rider	Team	Points
1	Stuart O'Grady (AUS)	Crédit Agricole	136
2	Erik Zabel (GER)	Team Telekom	127
3	Damien Nazon (FRA)	Bonjour	90

General classification after stage 9

Rank	Rider	Team	Time
1	Stuart O'Grady (AUS)	Crédit Agricole	38h 55' 30"
2	François Simon (FRA)	Bonjour	+ 4' 32"
3	Bram de Groot (NED)	Rabobank	+ 21' 16"
4	Andrey Kivilev (KAZ)	Cofidis	+ 22' 07"
5	Sven Teutenberg (GER)	Festina	+ 27' 15"
6	Jens Voigt (GER)	Crédit Agricole	+ 29' 23"
7	Ludo Dierckxsens (BEL)	Lampre–Daikin	+ 29' 49"
8	Marc Wauters (BEL)	Rabobank	+ 30' 12"
9	Ludovic Turpin (FRA)	AG2R Prévoyance	+ 30' 35"
10	Aitor González (ESP)	Kelme–Costa Blanca	+ 31' 56"

Mountains classification after Stage 9

Rank	Rider	Team	Points
1	Patrice Halgand (FRA)	Jean Delatour	66
2	Laurent Jalabert (FRA)	CSC–Tiscali	50
3	Laurent Brochard (FRA)	Jean Delatour	33

== Stage 10 ==
17 July 2001 — Aix-les-Bains to Alpe d'Huez, 209 km (129.9 mi)

Finally the mountains were reached, and the work started for the riders who went for the general classification. Only one normal Alps stage this year, plus a climbing time trial (stage 11).

Laurent Roux, Eladio Jimenez and Toni Tauler were the early attackers this stage, and by the time the riders reached the first of three 'hors category' climbs, the Madeleine, they were 13'35 ahead of a peloton of about 45 riders. The Telekom team of Jan Ullrich led this peloton, hoping to make it a tough race. On the second climb, the Glandon, only one man was still up front, Roux, and he was 7 minutes before the peloton. In that peloton, Armstrong seemed to be in problems. Where usually he would climb in the front of the group, he was now in the back, and his facial expressions were also not that positive. Furthermore, only two riders from his team (Roberto Heras and Jose Luis Rubiera) were with him.

But when the final mountain, the famous Alpe d'Huez was reached, things were shown to be very different, it looked like Armstrong had been bluffing in order to tempt Ullrich and his team into wasting their energy by forcing the pace too early in the stage. Rubiera attacked on the start of the climb, Armstrong followed, but only a few other riders did - in the end it is just Armstrong and Ullrich. When Rubiera has to drop off, Armstrong looks back. The camera angle made it appear as if he looks straight into the eyes of Ullrich, but in a later interview Armstrong denied this, saying he was looking for who else was around. Armstrong then attacks again. Ullrich cannot respond to Armstrong who loses him and climbs the Alpe alone. He overtakes Roux, and climbs up the Alpe d'Huez in 38'01" - only 26 seconds short of Marco Pantani's record from 1995, scored after a much lighter stage. Kivilev (12th at 4.39) keeps up well, and seems likely to take the yellow jersey in the Pyrenees, whilst Ullrich battles hard to limit his losses and take 2nd place on the stage. For now, the yellow is on the shoulders of François Simon, who scored a creditable 29th place (10.20 behind Armstrong). Stuart O'Grady ends way in the back. After having worn it six days, he says goodbye to the yellow jersey. He is now concentrating on the green one. Armstrong is now the first of the favourites, at fourth place. He will still have to deal with Simon and Kivilev before getting the yellow.

Stage 10 result

Rank	Rider	Team	Time
~~1~~	~~Lance Armstrong (USA)~~	~~U.S. Postal Service~~	~~6h 23' 47"~~
2	Jan Ullrich (GER)	Team Telekom	+ 1' 59"
3	Joseba Beloki (ESP)	ONCE–Eroski	+ 2' 09"
4	Christophe Moreau (FRA)	Festina	+ 2' 30"
5	Óscar Sevilla (ESP)	Kelme–Costa Blanca	+ 2' 54"
6	Francisco Mancebo (ESP)	iBanesto.com	+ 4' 01"
7	Laurent Roux (FRA)	Jean Delatour	+ 4' 03"
8	Igor González de Galdeano (ESP)	ONCE–Eroski	s.t.
9	Roberto Laiseka (ESP)	Euskaltel–Euskadi	s.t.
10	Leonardo Piepoli (ITA)	iBanesto.com	+ 4' 07"

Points classification after Stage 10

Rank	Rider	Team	Points
1	Stuart O'Grady (AUS)	Crédit Agricole	136
2	Erik Zabel (GER)	Team Telekom	127
3	Damien Nazon (FRA)	Bonjour	90

General classification after stage 10

Rank	Rider	Team	Time
1	François Simon (FRA)	Bonjour	45h 34' 09"
2	Andrey Kivilev (KAZ)	Cofidis	+ 11' 54"
3	Stuart O'Grady (AUS)	Festina	+ 18' 10"
~~4~~	~~Lance Armstrong (USA)~~	~~U.S. Postal Service~~	~~+ 20' 07"~~
5	Joseba Beloki (ESP)	ONCE–Eroski	+ 21' 42"
6	Christophe Moreau (FRA)	Festina	+ 22' 21"
7	Jan Ullrich (GER)	Team Telekom	+ 22' 41"
8	Igor González de Galdeano (ESP)	ONCE–Eroski	+ 23' 34"
9	Óscar Sevilla (ESP)	Kelme–Costa Blanca	+ 24' 07"
10	Santiago Botero (COL)	Kelme–Costa Blanca	+ 25' 52"

Mountains classification after Stage 10

Rank	Rider	Team	Points
1	Laurent Roux (FRA)	Jean Delatour	127
2	Laurent Jalabert (FRA)	CSC–Tiscali	106
3	Eladio Jiménez (ESP)	iBanesto.com	80
