= 2001 Tour de France, Stage 11 to Stage 20 =

Stages of cycle race

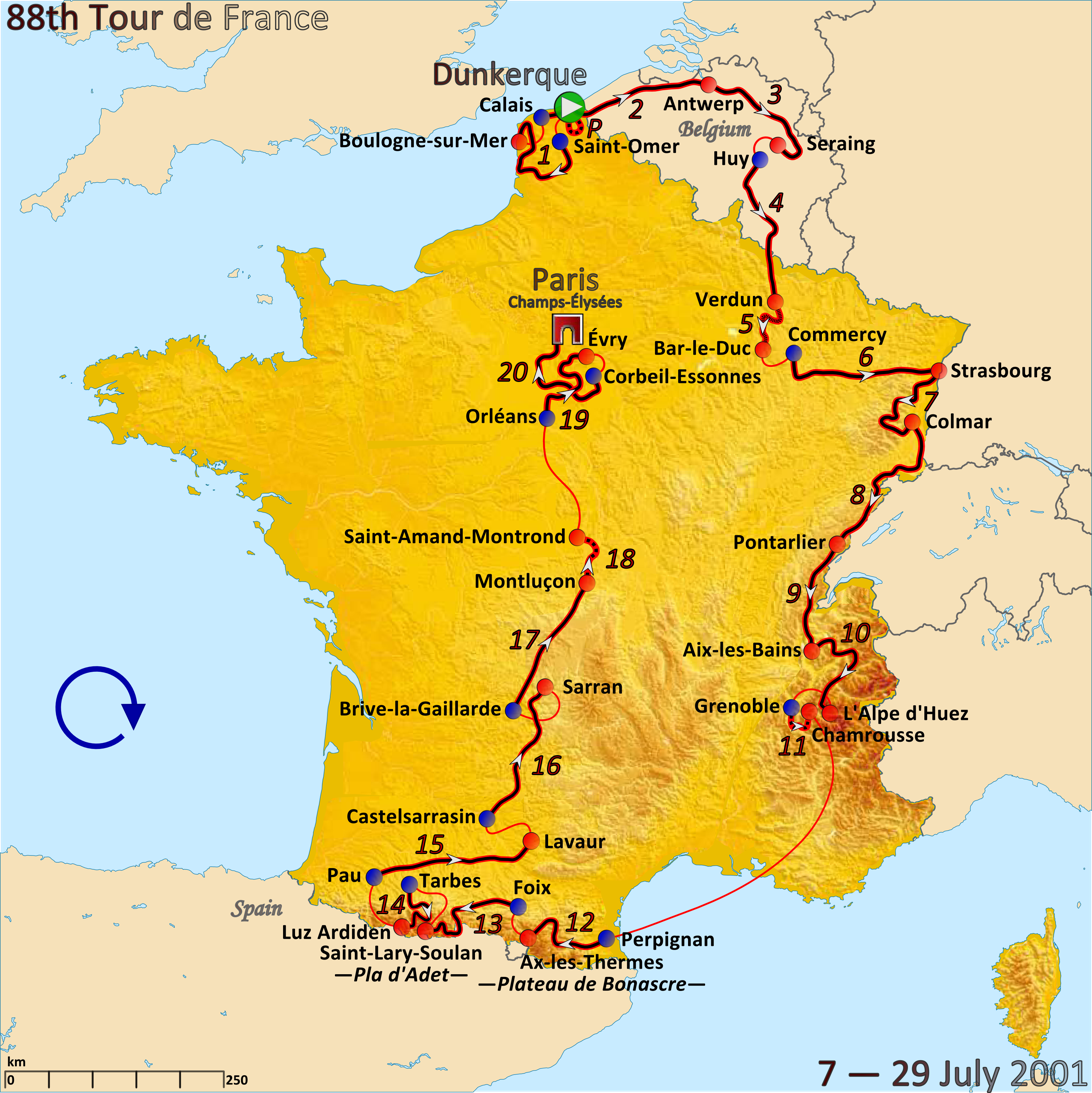
Route of the 2001 Tour de France

The 2001 Tour de France was the 88th edition of Tour de France, one of cycling's Grand Tours. The Tour began in Dunkirk with a prologue individual time trial on 7 July and Stage 11 occurred on 18 July with an individual time trial from Grenoble. The race finished on the Champs-Élysées in Paris on 29 July.

== Stage 11 ==
18 July 2001 — Grenoble to Chamrousse, 32 km (19.9 mi) (ITT)

A mountain time trial was part of the Tour de France for the first time in several years. Lance Armstrong once again showed that he is the #1 contender for this year's tour. Laiseka, Sevilla and Montgomery all have a good result. Kivilev, however, falters, placing 32nd at more than 6 minutes behind Armstrong. He is a good climber but not a skilled time trialist.

Stage 11 result

Rank	Rider	Team	Time
1	~~Lance Armstrong (USA)~~	~~U.S. Postal Service~~	~~1h 07' 27"~~
2	Jan Ullrich (GER)	Team Telekom	+ 1' 00"
3	Joseba Beloki (ESP)	ONCE–Eroski	+ 1' 35"
4	Roberto Laiseka (ESP)	Euskaltel–Euskadi	+ 2' 03"
5	Óscar Sevilla (ESP)	Kelme–Costa Blanca	+ 2' 24"
6	Igor González de Galdeano (ESP)	ONCE–Eroski	+ 2' 31"
7	Santiago Botero (COL)	Kelme–Costa Blanca	+ 2' 43"
8	Christophe Moreau (FRA)	Festina	+ 3' 00"
9	Sven Montgomery (SUI)	Française des Jeux	+ 3' 07"
10	Stefano Garzelli (ITA)	Mapei–Quick-Step	+ 3' 08"

General classification after stage 11

Rank	Rider	Team	Time
1	François Simon (FRA)	Bonjour	46h 48' 36"
2	Andrey Kivilev (KAZ)	Cofidis	+ 11' 01"
~~3~~	~~Lance Armstrong (USA)~~	~~U.S. Postal Service~~	~~+ 13' 07"~~
4	Joseba Beloki (ESP)	ONCE–Eroski	+ 16' 17"
5	Jan Ullrich (GER)	Team Telekom	+ 16' 41"
6	Christophe Moreau (FRA)	Festina	+ 18' 21"
7	Igor González de Galdeano (ESP)	ONCE–Eroski	+ 19' 05"
8	Óscar Sevilla (ESP)	Kelme–Costa Blanca	+ 19' 31"
9	Santiago Botero (COL)	Kelme–Costa Blanca	+ 21' 35"
10	Stuart O'Grady (AUS)	Crédit Agricole	+ 21' 48"

== Rest Day 1 ==
19 July 2001 — Perpignan

== Stage 12 ==
20 July 2001 — Perpignan to Ax-les-Thermes, 166.5 km (103.5 mi)

After stage 11 there was a rest day, although the amount of rest the riders actually did get was diminished by the fact that they had to make a long transportation. Stage 12 was the first of three stages in the Pyrenees. In the first stages of the race, Italian Paolo Bettini was the great attacker. Grouping with Stuart O'Grady and finally alone, he was ahead for a long time. In the final climb, however, he was caught by two other riders who were better climbers: Spain's David Etxebarria and Colombia's Felix Cardenas. By then, the Tour was already over for Christophe Moreau: He suffered what was probably a case of food poisoning, and abandoned.

Behind the three riders, Armstrong, Ullrich and Kivilev had escaped from the group of favorites. When Ullrich attacked, Kivilev was unable to follow. At the front, Etxebarria made a few attempts, which dropped Bettini but not Cardenas. When Cardenas himself attacked, Etxebarria was unable to follow. Armstrong and Ullrich were joined by Roberto Laiseka, who soon left the two favorites behind and started chasing Cardenas. Beloki tried to reach the Armstrong-Ullrich duo, but failed. Armstrong managed to get away from Ullrich, but he could not further overtake Laiseka and Cardenas. Simon lost another 4 minutes to Armstrong, who moved within half a minute of Kivilev.

Stage 12 result

Rank	Rider	Team	Time
1	Félix Cárdenas (COL)	Kelme–Costa Blanca	5h 03' 34"
2	Roberto Laiseka (ESP)	Euskaltel–Euskadi	+ 13"
~~3~~	~~Lance Armstrong (USA)~~	~~U.S. Postal Service~~	~~+ 15"~~
4	Jan Ullrich (GER)	Team Telekom	+ 38"
5	David Etxebarria (ESP)	Euskaltel–Euskadi	+ 59"
6	Óscar Sevilla (ESP)	Kelme–Costa Blanca	+ 1' 01"
7	Joseba Beloki (ESP)	ONCE–Eroski	s.t.
8	Santiago Botero (COL)	Kelme–Costa Blanca	+ 1' 35"
9	Michael Boogerd (NED)	Rabobank	s.t.
10	Alexander Vinokourov (KAZ)	Team Telekom	s.t.

General classification after stage 12

Rank	Rider	Team	Time
1	François Simon (FRA)	Bonjour	51h 56' 14"
2	Andrey Kivilev (KAZ)	Cofidis	+ 8' 42"
~~3~~	~~Lance Armstrong (USA)~~	~~U.S. Postal Service~~	~~+ 9' 10"~~
4	Joseba Beloki (ESP)	ONCE–Eroski	+ 13' 14"
5	Jan Ullrich (GER)	Team Telekom	+ 13' 15"
6	Óscar Sevilla (ESP)	Kelme–Costa Blanca	+ 16' 28"
7	Igor González de Galdeano (ESP)	ONCE–Eroski	+ 16' 40"
8	Santiago Botero (COL)	Kelme–Costa Blanca	+ 19' 06"
9	Didier Rous (FRA)	Bonjour	+ 22' 55"
10	Marcos-Antonio Serrano (ESP)	ONCE–Eroski	+ 22' 58"

== Stage 13 ==
21 July 2001 — Foix to Saint-Lary-Soulan Pla d'Adet, 194 km (120.5 mi)

A group of nine attacked early. On the first climb, Laurent Roux took the points, strengthening his position, then Laurent Jalabert attacked, and started a long solo. Behind him, the group got smaller and smaller, in the end only Alexandre Vinokourov and Stive Vermaut remained.

Jan Ullrich attacked on the Peyresourde, and escaped together with Lance Armstrong and Ullrich's teammate Kevin Livingston, who had escaped earlier. However, during the descent he mis-judged a curve, and ended up off the road. Luckily, both bicycle and rider had no severe damage, and Ullrich quickly was able to ride again. Armstrong had not mis-used Ullrich's problems to attack, and Ullrich rejoined a group with Armstrong, Beloki and a few others. By now, all original escapers but Jalabert had been caught back, between Jaja and the group-Armstrong/Ullrich, there was only Stefano Garzelli left.

Jalabert, understandably tired of his long solo on a very difficult stage, was in problems during the final climb. Armstrong had chosen this climb for yet another attack. First his teammate Rubiera led the group, then Heras took over. Only Armstrong and Ullrich were able to follow. Heras himself had to drop off too later, and Armstrong managed to ride away from Ullrich. Jalabert's long solo was not rewarded with a stage win, Armstrong and five others took him over. However, it did bring him both the mountains jersey and the first place in the most combative rider classification. He would keep both to the finish in Paris.

Armstrong dedicated his win to Fabio Casartelli, his (then) teammate, who died after a fall on the Portet d'Aspet, this stage's first climb, in the Tour de France of 1995. Apart from the stage, he also took over the first place in the general classification. Kivilev and Simon still hang on, in second and third place.

Stage 13 result

Rank	Rider	Team	Time
~~1~~	~~Lance Armstrong (USA)~~	~~U.S. Postal Service~~	~~5h 44' 22"~~
2	Jan Ullrich (GER)	Team Telekom	+ 1' 00"
3	Joseba Beloki (ESP)	ONCE–Eroski	+ 1' 46"
4	Roberto Heras (ESP)	U.S. Postal Service	s.t.
5	Stefano Garzelli (ITA)	Mapei–Quick-Step	+ 2' 29"
6	Igor González de Galdeano (ESP)	ONCE–Eroski	+ 2' 52"
7	Laurent Jalabert (FRA)	CSC–Tiscali	+ 3' 12"
8	Marcos-Antonio Serrano (ESP)	ONCE–Eroski	+ 3' 15"
9	Iñigo Chaurreau (ESP)	Euskaltel–Euskadi	+ 3' 25"
10	Andrey Kivilev (KAZ)	Cofidis	+ 4' 02"

General classification after stage 13

Rank	Rider	Team	Time
~~1~~	~~Lance Armstrong (USA)~~	~~U.S. Postal Service~~	~~57h 49' 26"~~
2	Andrey Kivilev (KAZ)	Cofidis	+ 3' 54"
3	François Simon (FRA)	Bonjour	+ 4' 31"
4	Jan Ullrich (GER)	Team Telekom	+ 5' 13"
5	Joseba Beloki (ESP)	ONCE–Eroski	+ 6' 02"
6	Igor González de Galdeano (ESP)	ONCE–Eroski	+ 10' 42"
7	Óscar Sevilla (ESP)	Kelme–Costa Blanca	+ 13' 24"
8	Santiago Botero (COL)	Kelme–Costa Blanca	+ 15' 00"
9	Marcos-Antonio Serrano (ESP)	ONCE–Eroski	+ 17' 23"
10	Stefano Garzelli (ITA)	Mapei–Quick-Step	+ 17' 26"

== Stage 14 ==
22 July 2001 — Tarbes to Luz Ardiden, 141.5 km (87.9 mi)

The last mountain stage of this Tour de France. At the first climb, a group of 10 riders was ahead, but at the second climb, the Tourmalet, the highest point of this year's Tour (2,115 m (6,939 ft)), Sven Montgomery and Mario Aerts lost everyone but David Moncoutié and Bobby Julich, with the latter not looking good either. Julich did indeed drop off, as did Montgomery during the descent. The other two were caught back by Wladimir Belli, who attacked on the final climb to Luz Ardiden, hoping to win the stage in a solo.

However, the group with Armstrong, Ullrich and the other favourites was only one minute behind, and from this group Roberto Laiseka attacked, and passed the remaining escapers one by one, finally passing Belli and getting ready for the win 5 km before the finish. Armstrong again ordered Heras to turn up the speed, and again Armstrong and Ullrich were the only ones who were able to follow. When Heras also had to drop off, Ullrich attacked, but Armstrong did not break, and together the two went to the finish, hand-in-hand with Armstrong not contesting the third-place time bonus. Ullrich took the second place in the general classification, Beloki still has to gain 1'20" on Kivilev in the time trial to gain third place.

Stage 14 result

Rank	Rider	Team	Time
1	Roberto Laiseka (ESP)	Euskaltel–Euskadi	4h 24' 30"
2	Wladimir Belli (ITA)	Fassa Bortolo	+ 54"
3	Jan Ullrich (GER)	Team Telekom	+ 1' 08"
~~4~~	~~Lance Armstrong (USA)~~	~~U.S. Postal Service~~	~~s.t.~~
5	Roberto Heras (ESP)	U.S. Postal Service	+ 1' 29"
6	Joseba Beloki (ESP)	ONCE–Eroski	+ 1' 39"
7	Óscar Sevilla (ESP)	Kelme–Costa Blanca	s.t.
8	Didier Rous (FRA)	Bonjour	+ 2' 01"
9	Andrey Kivilev (KAZ)	Cofidis	+ 2' 27"
10	Igor González de Galdeano (ESP)	ONCE–Eroski	+ 2' 30"

General classification after stage 14

Rank	Rider	Team	Time
~~1~~	~~Lance Armstrong (USA)~~	~~U.S. Postal Service~~	~~62h 15' 04"~~
2	Jan Ullrich (GER)	Team Telekom	+ 5' 05"
3	Andrey Kivilev (KAZ)	Cofidis	+ 5' 13"
4	Joseba Beloki (ESP)	ONCE–Eroski	+ 6' 33"
5	François Simon (FRA)	Bonjour	+ 10' 54"
6	Igor González de Galdeano (ESP)	ONCE–Eroski	+ 12' 04"
7	Óscar Sevilla (ESP)	Kelme–Costa Blanca	+ 13' 55"
8	Santiago Botero (COL)	Kelme–Costa Blanca	+ 17' 49"
9	Marcos-Antonio Serrano (ESP)	ONCE–Eroski	+ 19' 20"
10	Stefano Garzelli (ITA)	Mapei–Quick-Step	+ 19' 45"

== Rest day 2 ==
23 July 2001 — Pau

== Stage 15 ==
24 July 2001 — Pau to Lavaur, 232.5 km (144.5 mi)

After the second resting day, and this time without a move, the last tour week started. Expected were some breaks to keep getting away, and a mass spurt in the last stage and maybe once or twice more. For the general classification, only the time trial (stage 18) seems important.

Stage 15 fits nicely in this pattern, but with a small twist. After a wild start, with many attacks, a group of 25 riders got away, and at the finish had 15 minutes over the peloton. In the final stages, attacks happened in this group too, and Italian Marco Pinotti managed to get away. However, Belgian Rik Verbrugghe did the same, and after a long chase managed to reach Pinotti – not really unexpectedly, as Verbrugghe is known to be a good time trialist. The rest of the group would finish just a few seconds after the two. The spurt was easily won by Verbrugghe, Pinotti simply having not enough energy already in the last kilometers.

The little twist is that one of the riders in the group ahead was Michael Boogerd, who managed to climb from 16th to 8th place in the general classification, thus causing some change in the top 10 after all. The Kelme team of Santiago Botero tried to diminish the group's lead, so as to keep their leader in front of Boogerd in the general classification, but to no avail. Still, Boogerd was not satisfied. He would gladly have given his top-ten position for the stage win. Even less satisfied was Alessandro Petacchi, who easily won the spurt of the group, but realised that he had missed his chance of a stage win.

Stage 15 result

Rank	Rider	Team	Time
1	Rik Verbrugghe (BEL)	Lotto–Adecco	5h 16' 21"
2	Marco Pinotti (ITA)	Lampre–Daikin	s.t.
3	Alessandro Petacchi (ITA)	Fassa Bortolo	+ 6"
4	Sylvain Chavanel (FRA)	Bonjour	s.t.
5	Nico Mattan (BEL)	Cofidis	s.t.
6	Nicolas Jalabert (FRA)	CSC–Tiscali	s.t.
7	Michael Boogerd (NED)	Rabobank	s.t.
8	Franck Bouyer (FRA)	Kelme–Costa Blanca	+ 2' 43"
9	Marco Serpellini (ITA)	Lampre–Daikin	s.t.
10	Daniele Nardello (ITA)	Mapei–Quick-Step	s.t.

General classification after stage 15

Rank	Rider	Team	Time
~~1~~	~~Lance Armstrong (USA)~~	~~U.S. Postal Service~~	~~67h 46' 32"~~
2	Jan Ullrich (GER)	Team Telekom	+ 5' 05"
3	Andrey Kivilev (KAZ)	Cofidis	+ 5' 13"
4	Joseba Beloki (ESP)	ONCE–Eroski	+ 6' 33"
5	François Simon (FRA)	Bonjour	+ 10' 54"
6	Igor González de Galdeano (ESP)	ONCE–Eroski	+ 12' 04"
7	Óscar Sevilla (ESP)	Kelme–Costa Blanca	+ 13' 55"
8	Michael Boogerd (NED)	Rabobank	+ 16' 15"
9	Santiago Botero (COL)	Kelme–Costa Blanca	+ 17' 49"
10	Marcos-Antonio Serrano (ESP)	ONCE–Eroski	+ 19' 20"

== Stage 16 ==
25 July 2001 — Castelsarrasin to Sarran, 227.5 km (141.4 mi)

The stage went like the last one: Many attacks at the start, resulting in a group getting away and staying away. This time the group was smaller, just seven riders, but again someone escaped from the group around 25 km (16 mi) before the end. It was German attacker Jens Voigt; Australian time trialist Bradley McGee was the only one who was able to follow. In the uphill finish, McGee was not able to follow Voigt, who thus got a well-deserved stage win. In the peloton, a crash unfortunately forced several riders to resign.

Stage 16 result

Rank	Rider	Team	Time
1	Jens Voigt (GER)	Crédit Agricole	5h 27' 11"
2	Bradley McGee (AUS)	Française des Jeux	+ 5"
3	Alexander Bocharov (RUS)	AG2R Prévoyance	+ 1' 59"
4	Nicki Sørensen (DEN)	CSC–Tiscali	s.t.
5	Luis Pérez Rodríguez (ESP)	Festina	+ 2' 55"
6	Stéphane Heulot (FRA)	BigMat–Auber 93	+ 3' 44"
7	Eddy Seigneur (FRA)	Jean Delatour	+ 6' 39"
8	Erik Zabel (GER)	Kelme–Costa Blanca	+ 25' 45"
9	Stuart O'Grady (AUS)	Crédit Agricole	s.t.
10	Damien Nazon (FRA)	Bonjour	s.t.

General classification after stage 16

Rank	Rider	Team	Time
~~1~~	~~Lance Armstrong (USA)~~	~~U.S. Postal Service~~	~~73h 39' 28"~~
2	Jan Ullrich (GER)	Team Telekom	+ 5' 05"
3	Andrey Kivilev (KAZ)	Cofidis	+ 5' 13"
4	Joseba Beloki (ESP)	ONCE–Eroski	+ 6' 33"
5	François Simon (FRA)	Bonjour	+ 10' 54"
6	Igor González de Galdeano (ESP)	ONCE–Eroski	+ 12' 04"
7	Óscar Sevilla (ESP)	Kelme–Costa Blanca	+ 13' 55"
8	Michael Boogerd (NED)	Rabobank	+ 16' 15"
9	Santiago Botero (COL)	Kelme–Costa Blanca	+ 18' 12"
10	Marcos-Antonio Serrano (ESP)	ONCE–Eroski	+ 19' 20"

== Stage 17 ==
26 July 2001 — Brive-la-Gaillarde to Montluçon, 194 km (120.5 mi)

Early on a group of 16 riders escaped. When US Postal gave up chasing, their lead rapidly grew, but then the Bonjour team of Damien Nazon decided to lead the chase, and some other teams with sprinters (in particular Telekom) joined in. This caused the gap to become less again. Up front, Lelli attacked, and Baguet and Piil joined in. The rest of the group was caught by the peloton. Lelli, suffering from cramps, stopped working at the front, but the riders managed to stay ahead nevertheless. Baguet won the sprint.

Stage 17 result

Rank	Rider	Team	Time
1	Serge Baguet (BEL)	Lotto–Adecco	4h 13' 36"
2	Jakob Piil (DEN)	CSC–Tiscali	s.t.
3	Massimiliano Lelli (ITA)	Cofidis	+ 5"
4	Ján Svorada (CZE)	Lampre–Daikin	+ 13"
5	Damien Nazon (FRA)	Bonjour	s.t.
6	Erik Zabel (GER)	Team Telekom	s.t.
7	Stuart O'Grady (AUS)	Crédit Agricole	s.t.
8	Romāns Vainšteins (LAT)	Domo–Farm Frites–Latexco	s.t.
9	Alessandro Petacchi (ITA)	Fassa Bortolo	s.t.
10	Christophe Capelle (FRA)	BigMat–Auber 93	s.t.

General classification after stage 17

Rank	Rider	Team	Time
~~1~~	~~Lance Armstrong (USA)~~	~~U.S. Postal Service~~	~~77h 53' 17"~~
2	Jan Ullrich (GER)	Team Telekom	+ 5' 05"
3	Andrey Kivilev (KAZ)	Cofidis	+ 5' 13"
4	Joseba Beloki (ESP)	ONCE–Eroski	+ 6' 33"
5	François Simon (FRA)	Bonjour	+ 10' 54"
6	Igor González de Galdeano (ESP)	ONCE–Eroski	+ 12' 04"
7	Óscar Sevilla (ESP)	Kelme–Costa Blanca	+ 13' 55"
8	Michael Boogerd (NED)	Rabobank	+ 16' 15"
9	Santiago Botero (COL)	Kelme–Costa Blanca	+ 18' 12"
10	Marcos-Antonio Serrano (ESP)	ONCE–Eroski	+ 19' 20"

== Stage 18 ==
27 July 2001 — Montluçon to Saint-Amand-Montrond, 61 km (37.9 mi) (ITT)

The last stage that is supposed to be important for the final standings is an individual time trial. Armstrong, starting last because he is first in the general classification, shows once again his great form in this year's Tour, and gets his fourth stage, over 1 minute faster than number 2, Igor Gonzalez de Galdeano (although he is known as a good time trialist, still a slight surprise, as Ullrich is also a good time trialist and clearly the second-best in this Tour). Kivilev rode an excellent time trial given his weakness on this specialization, finishing 18th, but it was not enough to avoid losing third place to Beloki. Perhaps the greatest surprise of this stage was the fourth place of Frenchman Didier Rous.

Stage 18 result

Rank	Rider	Team	Time
~~1~~	~~Lance Armstrong (USA)~~	~~U.S. Postal Service~~	~~1h 14' 16"~~
2	Igor González de Galdeano (ESP)	ONCE–Eroski	+ 1' 24"
3	Jan Ullrich (GER)	Team Telekom	+ 1' 39"
4	Didier Rous (FRA)	Bonjour	+ 2' 25"
5	Marcos-Antonio Serrano (ESP)	ONCE–Eroski	s.t.
6	Joseba Beloki (ESP)	ONCE–Eroski	+ 2' 32"
7	Bobby Julich (USA)	Crédit Agricole	+ 2' 37"
8	Santiago Botero (COL)	Kelme–Costa Blanca	+ 2' 43"
9	Alexander Vinokourov (KAZ)	Team Telekom	+ 2' 57"
10	José Enrique Gutiérrez (ESP)	Kelme–Costa Blanca	+ 3' 01"

General classification after stage 18

Rank	Rider	Team	Time
~~1~~	~~Lance Armstrong (USA)~~	~~U.S. Postal Service~~	~~79h 07' 33"~~
2	Jan Ullrich (GER)	Team Telekom	+ 6' 44"
3	Joseba Beloki (ESP)	ONCE–Eroski	+ 9' 05"
4	Andrey Kivilev (KAZ)	Cofidis	+ 9' 53"
5	Igor González de Galdeano (ESP)	ONCE–Eroski	+ 13' 28"
6	François Simon (FRA)	Bonjour	+ 17' 22"
7	Óscar Sevilla (ESP)	Kelme–Costa Blanca	+ 18' 30"
8	Santiago Botero (COL)	Kelme–Costa Blanca	+ 20' 55"
9	Marcos-Antonio Serrano (ESP)	ONCE–Eroski	+ 21' 45"
10	Michael Boogerd (NED)	Rabobank	+ 22' 38"

== Stage 19 ==
28 July 2001 — Orléans to Évry, 149.5 km (92.9 mi)

Probably the least exciting stage of this year's Tour, stage 19 had no major escapes (Jens Voigt attacking more to help teammate Stuart O'Grady by avoiding too many points going to Erik Zabel), and ended in a mass sprint. Deutsche Telekom had worked hard to keep the group together, and was rewarded with Zabel's second stage win. O'Grady, finishing second, did remain ahead of Zabel in the points classification, but the difference is only 2 points now.

Stage 19 result

Rank	Rider	Team	Time
1	Erik Zabel (GER)	Team Telekom	3h 12' 27"
2	Stuart O'Grady (AUS)	Crédit Agricole	s.t.
3	Romāns Vainšteins (LAT)	Domo–Farm Frites–Latexco	s.t.
4	Sven Teutenberg (GER)	Festina	s.t.
5	Ján Svorada (CZE)	Lampre–Daikin	s.t.
6	Alessandro Petacchi (ITA)	Fassa Bortolo	s.t.
7	Damien Nazon (FRA)	Bonjour	s.t.
8	Alexei Sivakov (RUS)	BigMat–Auber 93	s.t.
9	Christophe Capelle (FRA)	BigMat–Auber 93	s.t.
10	Jimmy Casper (FRA)	Française des Jeux	s.t.

General classification after stage 19

Rank	Rider	Team	Time
~~1~~	~~Lance Armstrong (USA)~~	~~U.S. Postal Service~~	~~82h 20' 00"~~
2	Jan Ullrich (GER)	Team Telekom	+ 6' 44"
3	Joseba Beloki (ESP)	ONCE–Eroski	+ 9' 05"
4	Andrey Kivilev (KAZ)	Cofidis	+ 9' 53"
5	Igor González de Galdeano (ESP)	ONCE–Eroski	+ 13' 28"
6	François Simon (FRA)	Bonjour	+ 17' 22"
7	Óscar Sevilla (ESP)	Kelme–Costa Blanca	+ 18' 30"
8	Santiago Botero (COL)	Kelme–Costa Blanca	+ 20' 55"
9	Marcos-Antonio Serrano (ESP)	ONCE–Eroski	+ 21' 45"
10	Michael Boogerd (NED)	Rabobank	+ 22' 38"

== Stage 20 ==
29 July 2001 — Corbeil Essones to Paris, 160.5 km (99.7 mi)

As traditional, the last stage went to the Champs-Élysées in Paris, and as traditionally a number of attackers was unable to stay away from a peloton led by the groups of the sprinters. Although Française des Jeux had been working hard for Jimmy Casper, it was Jan Svorada who found himself well ahead about 200 meters from the finish. None of the other sprinters had a chance to overtake him. Erik Zabel was second, and had amassed enough points to take the green jersey from Stuart O'Grady. Zabel now had won the points classification for the sixth year in row. No one else had succeeded in winning the classification six times.

Stage 20 result

Rank	Rider	Team	Time
1	Ján Svorada (CZE)	Lampre–Daikin	3h 57' 28"
2	Erik Zabel (GER)	Team Telekom	s.t.
3	Stuart O'Grady (AUS)	Crédit Agricole	s.t.
4	Sven Teutenberg (GER)	Festina	s.t.
5	Alessandro Petacchi (ITA)	Fassa Bortolo	s.t.
6	Damien Nazon (FRA)	Bonjour	s.t.
7	Gennady Mikhaylov (RUS)	Lotto–Adecco	s.t.
8	Jimmy Casper (FRA)	BigMat–Auber 93	s.t.
9	Max van Heeswijk (NED)	Domo–Farm Frites–Latexco	s.t.
10	Christophe Capelle (FRA)	BigMat–Auber 93	s.t.

General classification after stage 20

Rank	Rider	Team	Time
~~1~~	~~Lance Armstrong (USA)~~	~~U.S. Postal Service~~	~~86h 17' 28"~~
2	Jan Ullrich (GER)	Team Telekom	+ 6' 44"
3	Joseba Beloki (ESP)	ONCE–Eroski	+ 9' 05"
4	Andrey Kivilev (KAZ)	Cofidis	+ 9' 53"
5	Igor González de Galdeano (ESP)	ONCE–Eroski	+ 13' 28"
6	François Simon (FRA)	Bonjour	+ 17' 22"
7	Óscar Sevilla (ESP)	Kelme–Costa Blanca	+ 18' 30"
8	Santiago Botero (COL)	Kelme–Costa Blanca	+ 20' 55"
9	Marcos-Antonio Serrano (ESP)	ONCE–Eroski	+ 21' 45"
10	Michael Boogerd (NED)	Rabobank	+ 22' 38"
