= 2001 Tour de France =

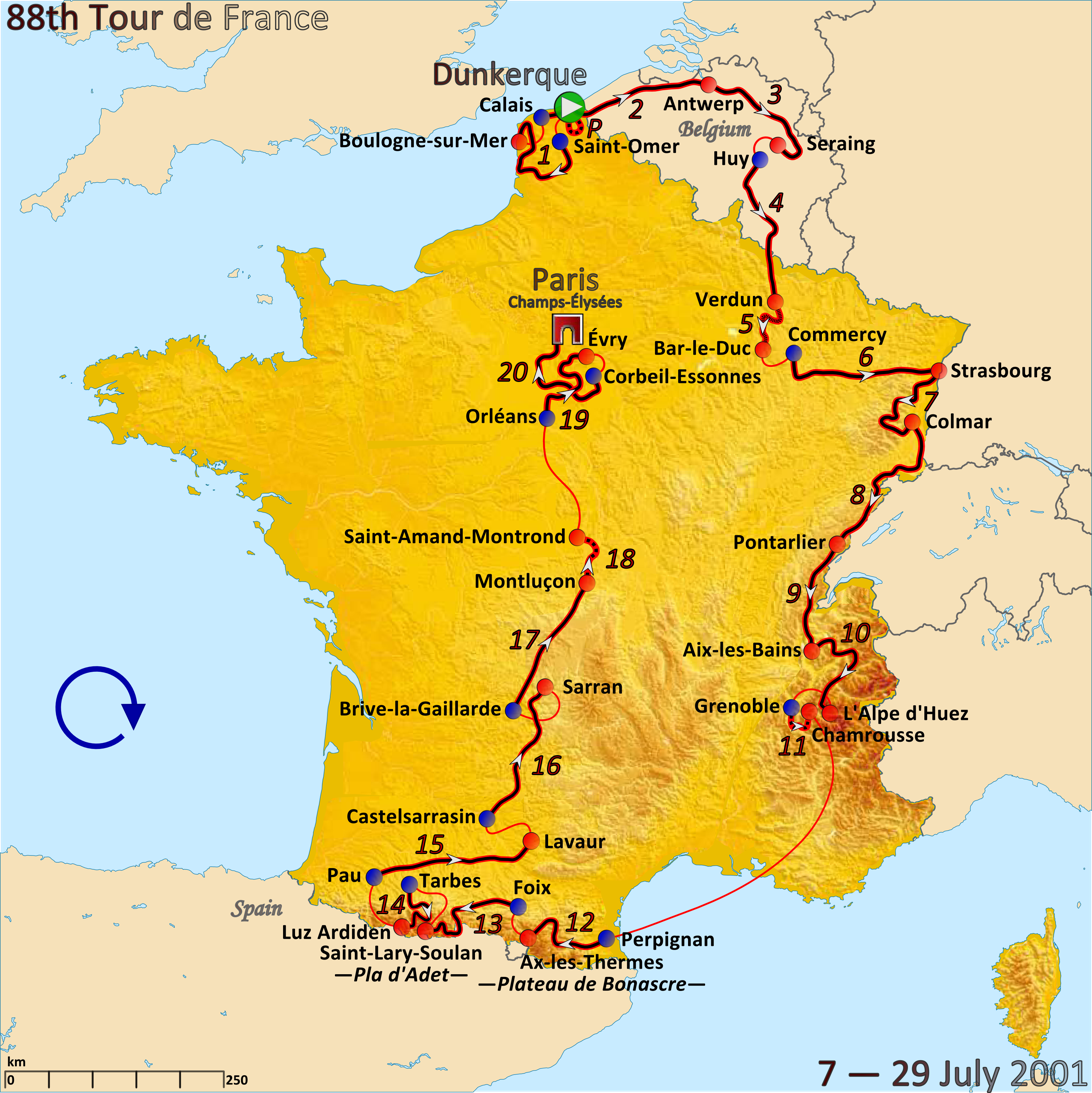
- Route of the 2001 Tour de France

Race details
- Dates: 7–29 July 2001
- Stages: 20 + Prologue
- Distance: 3,458 km (2,149 mi)
- Winning time: 86h 17' 28"

Results
| | Winner | ~~Lance Armstrong~~ none (Note: On 24 August 2012, the United States Anti-Doping Agency announced that they had disqualified Armstrong from all his results since 1998, including his victory in the 2001 Tour de France. The Union Cycliste Internationale, responsible for the international cycling, confirmed this verdict on 22 October 2012.) | |
| | Second | Jan Ullrich (GER) | (Team Telekom) |
| | Third | Joseba Beloki (ESP) | (ONCE–Eroski) |
| Jersey awarded to the points classification winner | Points | Erik Zabel (GER) | (Team Telekom) |
| Jersey awarded to the mountains classification winner | Mountains | Laurent Jalabert (FRA) | (CSC–Tiscali) |
| Jersey awarded to the youth classification winner | Youth | Óscar Sevilla (ESP) | (Kelme–Costa Blanca) |
| Jersey awarded to the combativity classification winner | Combativity | Laurent Jalabert (FRA) | (CSC–Tiscali) |
| | Team | Kelme–Costa Blanca | |

The 2001 Tour de France was a multiple-stage bicycle race held from 7 to 29 July, and the 88th edition of the Tour de France. It has no overall winner—although American cyclist Lance Armstrong originally won the event, the United States Anti-Doping Agency announced in August 2012 that they had disqualified Armstrong from all his results since 1998, including his seven Tour de France wins from 1999 to 2005. The verdict was subsequently confirmed by the Union Cycliste Internationale.

The race included a 67-kilometre-long (42 mi) team time trial, two individual time trials and five consecutive mountain-top finishing stages, the second of which was the Chamrousse special-category climb time trial. Thus, all the high-mountain stages were grouped consecutively, following the climbing time trial, with one rest day in between. France was ridden 'clockwise', so the Alps were visited before the Pyrenees. The Tour started in France but also visited Belgium in its first week. The ceremonial final stage finished at the Champs-Élysées in Paris, as is tradition. Erik Zabel won his record sixth consecutive points classification victory. This was a record for points classification victories and is still a record for most consecutive victories, however Peter Sagan now holds the record for most total green jersey wins with seven.

== Teams ==
The organisers felt that the 2000 Tour de France had not included enough French teams and consequently changed the selection procedure. U.S. Postal Service was selected because it included the winner of the previous edition, Lance Armstrong. Team Telekom was selected because it included the winner of the 2000 UCI Road World Cup, Erik Zabel). Mapei–Quick-Step was selected because it won the team classification in the 2000 Giro d'Italia. Kelme–Costa Blanca was selected because it won the team classifications in both the 2000 Tour de France and 2000 Vuelta a España. A further twelve teams qualified based on the UCI ranking in the highest UCI division at the end of 2000, after compensating for transfers. Although initially it was announced that four wildcards would be given, the tour organisation decided to add five teams: In total, 21 teams participated, each with 9 cyclists, giving a total of 189 cyclists.

The teams entering the race were:

Qualified teams

- AG2R Prévoyance
- Bonjour
- Cofidis
- Crédit Agricole
- Domo–Farm Frites–Latexco
- Fassa Bortolo
- Festina
- iBanesto.com
- Jean Delatour
- Kelme–Costa Blanca
- Lampre–Daikin
- Mapei–Quick-Step
- ONCE–Eroski
- Rabobank
- Team Telekom
- U.S. Postal Service

Invited teams

- BigMat–Auber 93
- CSC–Tiscali
- Euskaltel–Euskadi
- Française des Jeux
- Lotto–Adecco

== Route and stages ==
The highest point of elevation in the race was 2,115 m (6,939 ft) at the summit of the Col du Tourmalet mountain pass on stage 14.

Stage characteristics and winners
| Stage | Date | Course | Distance | Type | Winner |
|---|---|---|---|---|---|
| P | 7 July | Dunkirk | 8.2 km (5.1 mi) | Individual time trial | Christophe Moreau (FRA) |
| 1 | 8 July | Saint-Omer to Boulogne-sur-Mer | 194.5 km (120.9 mi) | Flat stage | Erik Zabel (GER) |
| 2 | 9 July | Calais to Antwerp (Belgium) | 220.5 km (137.0 mi) | Flat stage | Marc Wauters (BEL) |
| 3 | 10 July | Antwerp (Belgium) to Seraing (Belgium) | 198.5 km (123.3 mi) | Flat stage | Erik Zabel (GER) |
| 4 | 11 July | Huy (Belgium) to Verdun | 215.0 km (133.6 mi) | Flat stage | Laurent Jalabert (FRA) |
| 5 | 12 July | Verdun to Bar-le-Duc | 67.0 km (41.6 mi) | Team time trial | Crédit Agricole |
| 6 | 13 July | Commercy to Strasbourg | 211.5 km (131.4 mi) | Flat stage | Jaan Kirsipuu (EST) |
| 7 | 14 July | Strasbourg to Colmar | 162.5 km (101.0 mi) | Medium mountain stage | Laurent Jalabert (FRA) |
| 8 | 15 July | Colmar to Pontarlier | 222.5 km (138.3 mi) | Flat stage | Erik Dekker (NED) |
| 9 | 16 July | Pontarlier to Aix-les-Bains | 185.0 km (115.0 mi) | Flat stage | Serguei Ivanov (RUS) |
| 10 | 17 July | Aix-les-Bains to Alpe d'Huez | 209.0 km (129.9 mi) | High mountain stage | ~~Lance Armstrong (USA)~~ |
| 11 | 18 July | Grenoble to Chamrousse | 32.0 km (19.9 mi) | Individual time trial | ~~Lance Armstrong (USA)~~ |
| | 19 July | Perpignan | | Rest day | |
| 12 | 20 July | Perpignan to Plateau de Bonascre | 166.5 km (103.5 mi) | High mountain stage | Félix Cárdenas (COL) |
| 13 | 21 July | Foix to Saint-Lary-Soulan Pla d'Adet | 194.0 km (120.5 mi) | High mountain stage | ~~Lance Armstrong (USA)~~ |
| 14 | 22 July | Tarbes to Luz Ardiden | 141.5 km (87.9 mi) | High mountain stage | Roberto Laiseka (ESP) |
| | 23 July | Pau | | Rest day | |
| 15 | 24 July | Pau to Lavaur | 232.5 km (144.5 mi) | Flat stage | Rik Verbrugghe (BEL) |
| 16 | 25 July | Castelsarrasin to Sarran | 229.5 km (142.6 mi) | Flat stage | Jens Voigt (GER) |
| 17 | 26 July | Brive-la-Gaillarde to Montluçon | 194.0 km (120.5 mi) | Flat stage | Serge Baguet (BEL) |
| 18 | 27 July | Montluçon to Saint-Amand-Montrond | 61.0 km (37.9 mi) | Individual time trial | ~~Lance Armstrong (USA)~~ |
| 19 | 28 July | Orléans to Évry | 149.5 km (92.9 mi) | Flat stage | Erik Zabel (GER) |
| 20 | 29 July | Corbeil-Essonnes to Paris (Champs-Élysées) | 160.5 km (99.7 mi) | Flat stage | Ján Svorada (CZE) |
| | Total | | 3,458 km (2,149 mi) | | |

== Race overview ==
It was during this Tour de France that Johan Bruyneel, the Directeur Sportif of the US Postal team, intentionally mislead other teams about the condition of his riders through race radio, in an attempt to get opponents to believe his riders were suffering more than they actually were. This Tour is also noted for The Look, which became one of the more misinterpreted moments in cycling history.

=== Doping ===
After Armstrong abandoned his fight against the United States Anti-Doping Agency (USADA), he was stripped of his record seven Tour de France titles. The Union Cycliste Internationale endorsed the USADA sanctions and decided not to award victories to any other rider or upgrade other placings in any of the affected events. The 2001 Tour therefore has no official winner.

== Classification leadership and minor prizes ==
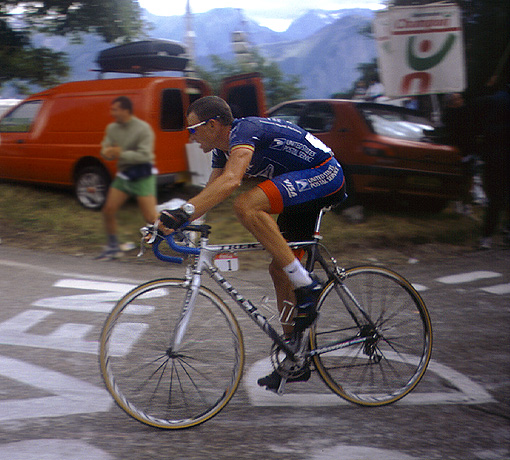
Lance Armstrong riding to his now-negated victory at Alpe d'Huez

There were several classifications in the 2001 Tour de France. The most important was the general classification, calculated by adding each cyclist's finishing times in each stage. The cyclist with the least accumulated time was the race leader, identified by the yellow jersey; the winner of this classification is considered the winner of the Tour.

Additionally, there was a points classification, which awarded a green jersey. In this classification, cyclists got points for finishing among the best in a stage finish, or in intermediate sprints. The cyclist with the most points lead the classification and was identified with a green jersey.

There was also a mountains classification. The organisation had categorised some climbs as either hors catégorie, first, second, third, or fourth-category; points for this classification were won by the first cyclists to reach the top of these climbs, with more points available for the higher-categorised climbs. The cyclist with the most points lead the classification and wore a white jersey with red polka dots.

The fourth individual classification was the young rider classification, which was marked by the white jersey. This was decided in the same way as the general classification, but only riders under 26 years of age were eligible.

For the team classification, the times of the best three cyclists per team on each stage were added; the leading team was the team with the lowest total time.

In addition, there was a combativity award given after each mass-start stage to the cyclist considered most combative, who wore a red number bib the next stage. The decision was made by a jury composed of journalists who gave points. The cyclist with the most points from votes in all stages led the combativity classification. Laurent Jalabert won this classification, and was given overall the super-combativity award.

There were also two special awards each with a prize of F 20,000, the Souvenir Henri Desgrange, given in honour of Tour founder and first race director Henri Desgrange to the first rider to pass the summit of the Col de la Madeleine on stage 10, and the Souvenir Jacques Goddet, given for the first time in honour of the second director Jacques Goddet to the first rider to pass the summit of the Col du Tourmalet on stage 14. Laurent Roux won the Henri Desgrange and Sven Montgomery won the Jacques Goddet.

Classification leadership by stage
| Stage | Winner | General classification | Points classification | Mountains classification | Young rider classification | Team classification | Combativity | |
| Stage | Winner | General classification | Points classification | Mountains classification | Young rider classification | Team classification | Award | Classification |
|---|---|---|---|---|---|---|---|---|
| P | Christophe Moreau | Christophe Moreau | Christophe Moreau | no award | Florent Brard | Festina | no award | |
| 1 | Erik Zabel | Christophe Moreau | Erik Zabel | Jacky Durand | Florent Brard | Festina | Jacky Durand | Jacky Durand |
| 2 | Marc Wauters | Marc Wauters | Jaan Kirsipuu | Jacky Durand | Robbie Hunter | Crédit Agricole | Jens Voigt | Jacky Durand |
| 3 | Erik Zabel | Stuart O'Grady | Erik Zabel | Benoît Salmon | Florent Brard | Crédit Agricole | Nicolas Jalabert | Jacky Durand |
| 4 | Laurent Jalabert | Stuart O'Grady | Erik Zabel | Patrice Halgand | Florent Brard | Crédit Agricole | Laurent Jalabert | Jacky Durand |
| 5 | Crédit Agricole | Stuart O'Grady | Erik Zabel | Patrice Halgand | Jörg Jaksche | Crédit Agricole | no award | Jacky Durand |
| 6 | Jaan Kirsipuu | Stuart O'Grady | Erik Zabel | Patrice Halgand | Jörg Jaksche | Crédit Agricole | Rik Verbrugghe | Jacky Durand |
| 7 | Laurent Jalabert | Jens Voigt | Erik Zabel | Patrice Halgand | Jörg Jaksche | Crédit Agricole | Laurent Jalabert | Laurent Jalabert |
| 8 | Erik Dekker | Stuart O'Grady | Stuart O'Grady | Patrice Halgand | Jörg Jaksche | Rabobank | Aitor González | Laurent Jalabert |
| 9 | Sergei Ivanov | Stuart O'Grady | Stuart O'Grady | Patrice Halgand | Jörg Jaksche | Rabobank | Bradley McGee | Laurent Jalabert |
| 10 | ~~Lance Armstrong~~ | François Simon | Stuart O'Grady | Laurent Roux | Óscar Sevilla | Rabobank | Laurent Roux | Laurent Roux |
| 11 | ~~Lance Armstrong~~ | François Simon | Stuart O'Grady | Laurent Roux | Óscar Sevilla | Rabobank | no award | Laurent Roux |
| 12 | Félix Cárdenas | François Simon | Stuart O'Grady | Laurent Roux | Óscar Sevilla | Rabobank | Paolo Bettini | Laurent Roux |
| 13 | ~~Lance Armstrong~~ | ~~Lance Armstrong~~ | Stuart O'Grady | Laurent Jalabert | Óscar Sevilla | Kelme–Costa Blanca | Laurent Jalabert | Laurent Jalabert |
| 14 | Roberto Laiseka | ~~Lance Armstrong~~ | Stuart O'Grady | Laurent Jalabert | Óscar Sevilla | Kelme–Costa Blanca | Wladimir Belli | Laurent Jalabert |
| 15 | Rik Verbrugghe | ~~Lance Armstrong~~ | Stuart O'Grady | Laurent Jalabert | Óscar Sevilla | Kelme–Costa Blanca | Marco Pinotti | Laurent Jalabert |
| 16 | Jens Voigt | ~~Lance Armstrong~~ | Stuart O'Grady | Laurent Jalabert | Óscar Sevilla | Kelme–Costa Blanca | Jens Voigt | Laurent Jalabert |
| 17 | Serge Baguet | ~~Lance Armstrong~~ | Stuart O'Grady | Laurent Jalabert | Óscar Sevilla | Kelme–Costa Blanca | Jakob Piil | Laurent Jalabert |
| 18 | ~~Lance Armstrong~~ | ~~Lance Armstrong~~ | Stuart O'Grady | Laurent Jalabert | Óscar Sevilla | Kelme–Costa Blanca | no award | Laurent Jalabert |
| 19 | Erik Zabel | ~~Lance Armstrong~~ | Stuart O'Grady | Laurent Jalabert | Óscar Sevilla | Kelme–Costa Blanca | Guillaume Auger | Laurent Jalabert |
| 20 | Ján Svorada | ~~Lance Armstrong~~ | Erik Zabel | Laurent Jalabert | Óscar Sevilla | Kelme–Costa Blanca | Alexander Vinokourov | Laurent Jalabert |
| Final | | ~~Lance Armstrong~~ | Erik Zabel | Laurent Jalabert | Óscar Sevilla | Kelme–Costa Blanca | Laurent Jalabert | |

- In stage 1, Igor González de Galdeano wore the green jersey.
- In stages 8 and 9, Erik Zabel wore the green jersey.

== Final standings ==
Legend
| Green jersey | Denotes the leader of the points classification | Polka dot jersey | Denotes the leader of the mountains classification |
| White jersey | Denotes the leader of the young rider classification | A white jersey with a red number bib. | Denotes the winner of the super-combativity award |

=== General classification ===
Final general classification (1–10)
| Rank | Rider | Team | Time |
|---|---|---|---|
| DSQ | ~~Lance Armstrong (USA)~~ | ~~U.S. Postal Service~~ | ~~86h 17' 28"~~ |
| 2 | Jan Ullrich (GER) | Team Telekom | + 6' 44" |
| 3 | Joseba Beloki (ESP) | ONCE–Eroski | + 9' 05" |
| 4 | Andrei Kivilev (KAZ) | Cofidis | + 9' 53" |
| 5 | Igor González (ESP) | ONCE–Eroski | + 13' 28" |
| 6 | François Simon (FRA) | Bonjour | + 17' 22" |
| 7 | Óscar Sevilla (ESP) | Kelme–Costa Blanca | + 18' 30" |
| 8 | Santiago Botero (COL) | Kelme–Costa Blanca | + 20' 55" |
| 9 | Marcos Antonio Serrano (ESP) | ONCE–Eroski | + 21' 45" |
| 10 | Michael Boogerd (NED) | Rabobank | + 22' 38" |

Final general classification (11–144)
| Rank | Rider | Team | Time |
|---|---|---|---|
| 11 | Didier Rous (FRA) | Bonjour | + 24' 22" |
| 12 | Íñigo Chaurreau (ESP) | Euskaltel–Euskadi | + 28' 09" |
| 13 | Francisco Mancebo (ESP) | iBanesto.com | + 28' 33" |
| 14 | Stefano Garzelli (ITA) | Mapei–Quick-Step | + 29' 00" |
| 15 | Roberto Heras (ESP) | U.S. Postal Service | + 30' 44" |
| 16 | Alexander Vinokourov (KAZ) | Team Telekom | + 33' 55" |
| 17 | Alexander Bocharov (RUS) | AG2R Prévoyance | + 41' 15" |
| 18 | Bobby Julich (USA) | Crédit Agricole | + 48' 04" |
| 19 | Laurent Jalabert (FRA) | CSC–Tiscali | + 50' 06" |
| 20 | Carlos Sastre (ESP) | ONCE–Eroski | + 50' 20" |
| 21 | Tomasz Brożyna (POL) | iBanesto.com | + 53' 35" |
| 22 | Axel Merckx (BEL) | Domo–Farm Frites–Latexco | + 55' 29" |
| 23 | Laurent Brochard (FRA) | Jean Delatour | + 56' 01" |
| 24 | Wladimir Belli (ITA) | Fassa Bortolo | + 57' 29" |
| 25 | José Enrique Gutiérrez (ESP) | Kelme–Costa Blanca | + 59' 17" |
| 26 | Andreas Klöden (GER) | Team Telekom | + 59' 53" |
| 27 | Mario Aerts (BEL) | Lotto–Adecco | + 1h 00' 06" |
| 28 | Roberto Laiseka (ESP) | Euskaltel–Euskadi | + 1h 02' 15" |
| 29 | Jörg Jaksche (GER) | ONCE–Eroski | + 1h 06' 02" |
| 30 | Daniel Atienza (ESP) | Cofidis | + 1h 07' 10" |
| 31 | Stéphane Goubert (FRA) | Jean Delatour | + 1h 08' 40" |
| 32 | Luis Perez (ESP) | Festina | + 1h 11' 07" |
| 33 | Michele Bartoli (ITA) | Mapei–Quick-Step | + 1h 13' 05" |
| 34 | David Etxebarria (ESP) | Euskaltel–Euskadi | + 1h 15' 57" |
| 35 | Benoit Salmon (FRA) | AG2R Prévoyance | + 1h 17' 07" |
| 36 | Stive Vermaut (BEL) | Lotto–Adecco | + 1h 20' 13" |
| 37 | Felix Manuel Garcia (ESP) | Festina | + 1h 20' 33" |
| 38 | José-Luis Rubiera (ESP) | U.S. Postal Service | + 1h 21' 48" |
| 39 | Giuseppe Guerini (ITA) | Team Telekom | + 1h 22' 01" |
| 40 | Stéphane Heulot (FRA) | BigMat–Auber 93 | + 1h 22' 02" |
| 41 | Javier Pascual Rodríguez (ESP) | iBanesto.com | + 1h 22' 37" |
| 42 | Walter Bénéteau (FRA) | Bonjour | + 1h 24' 28" |
| 43 | Kevin Livingston (USA) | Team Telekom | + 1h 24' 31" |
| 44 | Leonardo Piepoli (ITA) | iBanesto.com | + 1h 26' 21" |
| 45 | Guido Trentin (ITA) | Cofidis | + 1h 29' 40" |
| 46 | Jens Voigt (GER) | Crédit Agricole | + 1h 30' 02" |
| 47 | Denis Menchov (RUS) | iBanesto.com | + 1h 31' 50" |
| 48 | David Moncoutié (FRA) | Cofidis | + 1h 32' 09" |
| 49 | Nicki Sørensen (DEN) | CSC–Tiscali | + 1h 33' 14" |
| 50 | Laurent Roux (FRA) | Jean Delatour | + 1h 33' 26" |
| 51 | Udo Bölts (GER) | Team Telekom | + 1h 34' 10" |
| 52 | Marco Pinotti (ITA) | Lampre–Daikin | + 1h 34' 29" |
| 53 | Gilles Bouvard (FRA) | Jean Delatour | + 1h 35' 35" |
| 54 | Stuart O'Grady (AUS) | Crédit Agricole | + 1h 36' 20" |
| 55 | Patrice Halgand (FRA) | Jean Delatour | + 1h 38' 38" |
| 56 | Jean-Cyril Robin (FRA) | Bonjour | + 1h 39' 33" |
| 57 | Daniele Nardello (ITA) | Mapei–Quick-Step | + 1h 41' 49" |
| 58 | Javier Pascual (ESP) | Kelme–Costa Blanca | + 1h 44' 40" |
| 59 | Guennadi Mikhailov (RUS) | Lotto–Adecco | + 1h 46' 23" |
| 60 | Matteo Tosatto (ITA) | Fassa Bortolo | + 1h 50' 07" |
| 61 | Félix Rafael Cárdenas (COL) | Kelme–Costa Blanca | + 1h 55' 25" |
| 62 | Mikel Pradera (ESP) | ONCE–Eroski | + 1h 57' 09" |
| 63 | Íñigo Cuesta (ESP) | Cofidis | + 1h 58' 31" |
| 64 | José Iván Gutiérrez (ESP) | ONCE–Eroski | + 1h 59' 12" |
| 65 | Sylvain Chavanel (FRA) | Bonjour | + 1h 59' 40" |
| 66 | Daniel Schnider (SUI) | Française des Jeux | + 2h 00' 43" |
| 67 | Massimiliano Lelli (ITA) | Cofidis | + 2h 01' 26" |
| 68 | Piotr Wadecki (POL) | Domo–Farm Frites–Latexco | + 2h 02' 03" |
| 69 | Jon Odriozola (ESP) | iBanesto.com | + 2h 05' 23" |
| 70 | Paolo Bettini (ITA) | Mapei–Quick-Step | + 2h 05' 38" |
| 71 | George Hincapie (USA) | U.S. Postal Service | + 2h 05' 46" |
| 72 | Geert Verheyen (BEL) | Rabobank | + 2h 05' 53" |
| 73 | Haimar Zubeldia (ESP) | Euskaltel–Euskadi | + 2h 06' 17" |
| 74 | Franck Bouyer (FRA) | Bonjour | + 2h 07' 01" |
| 75 | Maarten den Bakker (NED) | Rabobank | + 2h 07' 42" |
| 76 | Antonio Tauler (ESP) | Kelme–Costa Blanca | + 2h 08' 11" |
| 77 | Alberto Lopez (ESP) | Euskaltel–Euskadi | + 2h 08' 19" |
| 78 | Ludovic Turpin (FRA) | AG2R Prévoyance | + 2h 09' 21" |
| 79 | Víctor Hugo Peña (COL) | U.S. Postal Service | + 2h 10' 05" |
| 80 | Sven Teutenberg (GER) | Festina | + 2h 11' 22" |
| 81 | Fabio Baldato (ITA) | Fassa Bortolo | + 2h 11' 50" |
| 82 | Viatcheslav Ekimov (RUS) | U.S. Postal Service | + 2h 17' 04" |
| 83 | Bradley McGee (AUS) | Française des Jeux | + 2h 17' 54" |
| 84 | Michael Blaudzun (DEN) | CSC–Tiscali | + 2h 22' 28" |
| 85 | Serge Baguet (BEL) | Lotto–Adecco | + 2h 22' 50" |
| 86 | José Angel Vidal (ESP) | Kelme–Costa Blanca | + 2h 23' 09" |
| 87 | Pascal Lino (FRA) | Festina | + 2h 24' 09" |
| 88 | Unai Etxebarria (VEN) | Euskaltel–Euskadi | + 2h 26' 04" |
| 89 | Nicolas Vogondy (FRA) | Française des Jeux | + 2h 27' 37" |
| 90 | Servais Knaven (NED) | Domo–Farm Frites–Latexco | + 2h 27' 51" |
| 91 | Erik Dekker (NED) | Rabobank | + 2h 29' 16" |
| 92 | Paul Van Hyfte (BEL) | Lotto–Adecco | + 2h 29' 57" |
| 93 | Marc Lotz (NED) | Rabobank | + 2h 31' 02" |
| 94 | Tyler Hamilton (USA) | U.S. Postal Service | + 2h 31' 35" |
| 95 | Eddy Seigneur (FRA) | Jean Delatour | + 2h 34' 19" |
| 96 | Erik Zabel (GER) | Team Telekom | + 2h 34' 28" |
| 97 | Alessandro Petacchi (ITA) | Fassa Bortolo | + 2h 35' 08" |
| 98 | Nico Mattan (BEL) | Cofidis | + 2h 35' 39" |
| 99 | Nicola Loda (ITA) | Fassa Bortolo | + 2h 35' 51" |
| 100 | Florent Brard (FRA) | Festina | + 2h 37' 05" |
| 101 | Steffen Kjærgaard (NOR) | U.S. Postal Service | + 2h 37' 24" |
| 102 | Christophe Mengin (FRA) | Française des Jeux | + 2h 40' 28" |
| 103 | Angel Castresana (ESP) | Euskaltel–Euskadi | + 2h 42' 41" |
| 104 | Alexei Sivakov (RUS) | BigMat–Auber 93 | + 2h 43' 02" |
| 105 | Eladio Jiménez (ESP) | iBanesto.com | + 2h 43' 08" |
| 106 | Jérôme Bernard (FRA) | Jean Delatour | + 2h 44' 09" |
| 107 | Anthony Morin (FRA) | Crédit Agricole | + 2h 46' 48" |
| 108 | Sebastien Demarbaix (BEL) | AG2R Prévoyance | + 2h 47' 19" |
| 109 | Damien Nazon (FRA) | Bonjour | + 2h 48' 10" |
| 110 | Raivis Belohvoščiks (LAT) | Lampre–Daikin | + 2h 48' 14" |
| 111 | Christophe Oriol (FRA) | Jean Delatour | + 2h 49' 00" |
| 112 | Rik Verbrugghe (BEL) | Lotto–Adecco | + 2h 49' 17" |
| 113 | Emmanuel Magnien (FRA) | Française des Jeux | + 2h 50' 07" |
| 114 | Pascal Chanteur (FRA) | Festina | + 2h 50' 26" |
| 115 | Nicolas Jalabert (FRA) | CSC–Tiscali | + 2h 50' 31" |
| 116 | Franck Rénier (BEL) | Bonjour | + 2h 56' 00" |
| 117 | Jakob Piil (DEN) | CSC–Tiscali | + 2h 58' 06" |
| 118 | Francisco Javier Cerezo (ESP) | CSC–Tiscali | + 2h 59' 57" |
| 119 | Frédérick Bessy (FRA) | Crédit Agricole | + 3h 01' 02" |
| 120 | Christophe Agnolutto (FRA) | AG2R Prévoyance | + 3h 01' 24" |
| 121 | Gilles Maignan (FRA) | AG2R Prévoyance | + 3h 01' 27" |
| 122 | Marcelino García (ESP) | CSC–Tiscali | + 3h 05' 05" |
| 123 | Christophe Capelle (FRA) | BigMat–Auber 93 | + 3h 05' 12" |
| 124 | Frédérick Guesdon (FRA) | Française des Jeux | + 3h 07' 12" |
| 125 | Marco Serpellini (ITA) | Lampre–Daikin | + 3h 07' 47" |
| 126 | Sébastien Talabardon (FRA) | BigMat–Auber 93 | + 3h 09' 02" |
| 127 | Jacky Durand (FRA) | Française des Jeux | + 3h 09' 58" |
| 128 | Matteo Frutti (ITA) | Lampre–Daikin | + 3h 13' 01" |
| 129 | Ján Svorada (CZE) | Lampre–Daikin | + 3h 17' 38" |
| 130 | Johan Verstrepen (BEL) | Lampre–Daikin | + 3h 21' 26" |
| 131 | Thierry Gouvenou (FRA) | BigMat–Auber 93 | + 3h 24' 23" |
| 132 | Romans Vainsteins (LAT) | Domo–Farm Frites–Latexco | + 3h 24' 56" |
| 133 | Ludovic Auger (FRA) | BigMat–Auber 93 | + 3h 26' 02" |
| 134 | Max van Heeswijk (NED) | Domo–Farm Frites–Latexco | + 3h 27' 22" |
| 135 | Stéphane Bergès (FRA) | AG2R Prévoyance | + 3h 29' 53" |
| 136 | Guillaume Auger (FRA) | BigMat–Auber 93 | + 3h 30' 44" |
| 137 | Sébastien Hinault (FRA) | Crédit Agricole | + 3h 33' 21" |
| 138 | Olivier Perraudeau (FRA) | Bonjour | + 3h 38' 00" |
| 139 | Christopher Jenner (FRA) | Crédit Agricole | + 3h 38' 21" |
| 140 | Rubens Bertogliati (SUI) | Lampre–Daikin | + 3h 39' 05" |
| 141 | Rolf Sørensen (DEN) | CSC–Tiscali | + 3h 40' 36" |
| 142 | Davide Bramati (ITA) | Mapei–Quick-Step | + 3h 41' 14" |
| 143 | Enrico Cassani (ITA) | Domo–Farm Frites–Latexco | + 3h 41' 46" |
| 144 | Jimmy Casper (FRA) | Française des Jeux | + 3h 52' 17" |

=== Points classification ===
Final points classification (1–10)
| Rank | Rider | Team | Points |
|---|---|---|---|
| 1 | Erik Zabel (GER) | Team Telekom | 252 |
| 2 | Stuart O'Grady (AUS) | Crédit Agricole | 244 |
| 3 | Damien Nazon (FRA) | Bonjour | 169 |
| 4 | Alessandro Petacchi (ITA) | Fassa Bortolo | 148 |
| 5 | Sven Teutenberg (GER) | Festina | 141 |
| DSQ | ~~Lance Armstrong (USA)~~ | ~~U.S. Postal Service~~ | ~~134~~ |
| 7 | Jan Ullrich (GER) | Team Telekom | 127 |
| 8 | Ján Svorada (CZE) | Lampre–Daikin | 124 |
| 9 | Christophe Capelle (FRA) | BigMat–Auber 93 | 114 |
| 10 | François Simon (FRA) | Bonjour | 108 |

=== Mountains classification ===
Final mountains classification (1–10)
| Rank | Rider | Team | Points |
|---|---|---|---|
| 1 | Laurent Jalabert (FRA) | CSC–Tiscali | 258 |
| 2 | Jan Ullrich (GER) | Team Telekom | 211 |
| 3 | Laurent Roux (FRA) | Jean Delatour | 200 |
| DSQ | ~~Lance Armstrong (USA)~~ | ~~U.S. Postal Service~~ | ~~195~~ |
| 5 | Stefano Garzelli (ITA) | Mapei–Quick-Step | 164 |
| 6 | Roberto Laiseka (ESP) | Euskaltel–Euskadi | 147 |
| 7 | Joseba Beloki (ESP) | ONCE–Eroski | 145 |
| 8 | Alexander Vinokourov (KAZ) | Team Telekom | 134 |
| 9 | Patrice Halgand (FRA) | Jean Delatour | 123 |
| 10 | Óscar Sevilla (ESP) | Kelme–Costa Blanca | 120 |

=== Young rider classification ===
Final young rider classification (1–10)
| Rank | Rider | Team | Time |
|---|---|---|---|
| 1 | Óscar Sevilla (ESP) | Kelme–Costa Blanca | 86h 35' 58 |
| 2 | Francisco Mancebo (ESP) | iBanesto.com | + 10' 03" |
| 3 | Jörg Jaksche (DEU) | ONCE–Eroski | + 47' 32" |
| 4 | Denis Menchov (RUS) | iBanesto.com | + 1h 13' 20" |
| 5 | Marco Pinotti (ITA) | Lampre–Daikin | + 1h 15' 59" |
| 6 | Iván Gutiérrez (ESP) | ONCE–Eroski | + 1h 40' 42" |
| 7 | Sylvain Chavanel (FRA) | Bonjour | + 1h 41' 10" |
| 8 | Haimar Zubeldia (ESP) | Euskaltel–Euskadi | + 1h 47' 47" |
| 9 | Bradley McGee (AUS) | Française des Jeux | + 1h 59' 24" |
| 10 | Nicolas Vogondy (FRA) | Française des Jeux | + 2h 09' 07" |

=== Team classification ===
Final team classification (1–10)
| Rank | Team | Time |
|---|---|---|
| 1 | Kelme–Costa Blanca | 259h 14' 44" |
| 2 | ONCE–Eroski | + 4' 59" |
| 3 | Team Telekom | + 41' 06" |
| 4 | Bonjour | + 41' 49" |
| 5 | Rabobank | + 51' 53" |
| 6 | U.S. Postal Service | + 54' 51" |
| 7 | Cofidis | + 1h 20' 41" |
| 8 | iBanesto.com | + 1h 22' 24" |
| 9 | Festina | + 1h 45' 33" |
| 10 | Jean Delatour | + 1h 49' 18" |

=== Combativity classification ===
Final combativity classification (1–10)
| Rank | Rider | Team | Points |
|---|---|---|---|
| 1 | Laurent Jalabert (FRA) | CSC–Tiscali | 94 |
| 2 | Laurent Roux (FRA) | Jean Delatour | 55 |
| 3 | Jens Voigt (GER) | Crédit Agricole | 45 |
| 4 | Rik Verbrugghe (BEL) | Lotto–Adecco | 44 |
| 5 | Paolo Bettini (ITA) | Mapei–Quick-Step | 36 |
| 6 | Jacky Durand (FRA) | Française des Jeux | 36 |
| 7 | Bradley McGee (AUS) | Française des Jeux | 32 |
| 8 | David Etxebarria (ESP) | Euskaltel–Euskadi | 30 |
| 9 | Laurent Brochard (FRA) | Jean Delatour | 28 |
| 10 | Nicolas Jalabert (FRA) | CSC–Tiscali | 23 |

== Bibliography ==
- Augendre, Jacques (2016). "Guide historique" [Historical guide] (PDF). Tour de France (in French). Paris: Amaury Sport Organisation. Archived (PDF) from the original on 17 August 2016.
- Nauright, John; Parrish, Charles (2012). Sports Around the World: History, Culture, and Practice. Vol. 2. Santa Barbara, California: ABC-CLIO. ISBN 978-1-59884-300-2.
- van den Akker, Pieter (2018). Tour de France Rules and Statistics: 1903–2018. Self-published. ISBN 978-1-79398-080-9.
