= 2002 Critérium du Dauphiné Libéré =

Race details
- Dates: 9–16 June 2002
- Stages: 7 + Prologue
- Distance: 1,096 km (681 mi)
- Winning time: ~~28h 38' 50"~~

Results
| | Winner | ~~Lance Armstrong~~ | (~~U.S. Postal Service~~) |
| | Second | Floyd Landis (USA) | (U.S. Postal Service) |
| | Third | Christophe Moreau (FRA) | (Crédit Agricole) |
| Jersey awarded to the points classification winner | Points | Bradley McGee (AUS) | (Française des Jeux) |
| Jersey awarded to the mountains classification winner | Mountains | Dariusz Baranowski (POL) | (iBanesto.com) |
| | Team | iBanesto.com | |

The 2002 Critérium du Dauphiné Libéré was the 54th edition of the cycle race and was held from 9 June to 16 June 2002. The race started in Lyon and finished in Geneva. The race has no overall winner. Although Lance Armstrong originally won the event, he was stripped of the title due to violating anti-doping rules. In 2012, the United States Anti-Doping Agency disqualified him from his results after 1 August 1998. The verdict was confirmed by the UCI.

== Teams ==
Fourteen teams, containing a total of 110 riders, participated in the race:

- Crédit Agricole
- U.S. Postal Service
- CSC–Tiscali
- Cofidis
- Lotto–Adecco
- Bonjour
- Domo–Farm Frites
- Française des Jeux
- Kelme–Costa Blanca
- AG2R Prévoyance
- iBanesto.com
- Jean Delatour
- Euskaltel–Euskadi
- BigMat–Auber 93

== Route ==
Stage characteristics and winners
| Stage | Date | Course | Distance | Type | Winner |
|---|---|---|---|---|---|
| P | 9 June | Lyon | 3 km (1.9 mi) | Individual time trial | Bradley McGee (AUS) |
| 1 | 10 June | Châtillon-sur-Chalaronne to Saint-Étienne | 173 km (107 mi) | | Jacky Durand (FRA) |
| 2 | 11 June | Tournon-sur-Rhône to Mont Ventoux | 174 km (108 mi) | | Denis Menchov (RUS) |
| 3 | 12 June | Montélimar to Pierrelatte | 40 km (25 mi) | Individual time trial | Santiago Botero (COL) |
| 4 | 13 June | L'Isle-sur-la-Sorgue to Digne-les-Bains | 209 km (130 mi) | | Patrice Halgand (FRA) |
| 5 | 14 June | Digne-les-Bains to Grenoble | 204 km (127 mi) | | Frédéric Guesdon (FRA) |
| 6 | 15 June | Albertville to Morzine-Avoriaz | 146 km (91 mi) | | ~~Lance Armstrong (USA)~~ (Note: In 2012, Lance Armstrong was disqualified from his position in the race. He was stripped of all results after 1 August 1998, as a consequence of the Lance Armstrong doping case.) |
| 7 | 16 June | Morzine to Geneva | 150 km (93 mi) | | José Enrique Gutiérrez (ESP) |

== General classification ==
Final general classification

| Rank | Rider | Team | Time |
|---|---|---|---|
| ~~1~~ | ~~Lance Armstrong (USA)~~ | ~~U.S. Postal Service~~ | ~~28h 38' 50"~~ |
| 2 | Floyd Landis (USA) | U.S. Postal Service | + 2' 03" |
| 3 | Christophe Moreau (FRA) | Crédit Agricole | + 2' 24" |
| 4 | Haimar Zubeldia (ESP) | Euskaltel–Euskadi | + 2' 44" |
| 5 | Andrey Kivilev (KAZ) | Cofidis | + 3' 28" |
| 6 | Denis Menchov (RUS) | iBanesto.com | + 3' 46" |
| 7 | Aitor Kintana (ESP) | BigMat–Auber 93 | + 5' 09" |
| 8 | Marzio Bruseghin (ITA) | iBanesto.com | + 5' 34" |
| 9 | Richard Virenque (FRA) | Domo–Farm Frites | + 6' 11" |
| 10 | Nicolas Vogondy (FRA) | Française des Jeux | + 7' 09" |
