= Christophe Oriol =

French cyclist

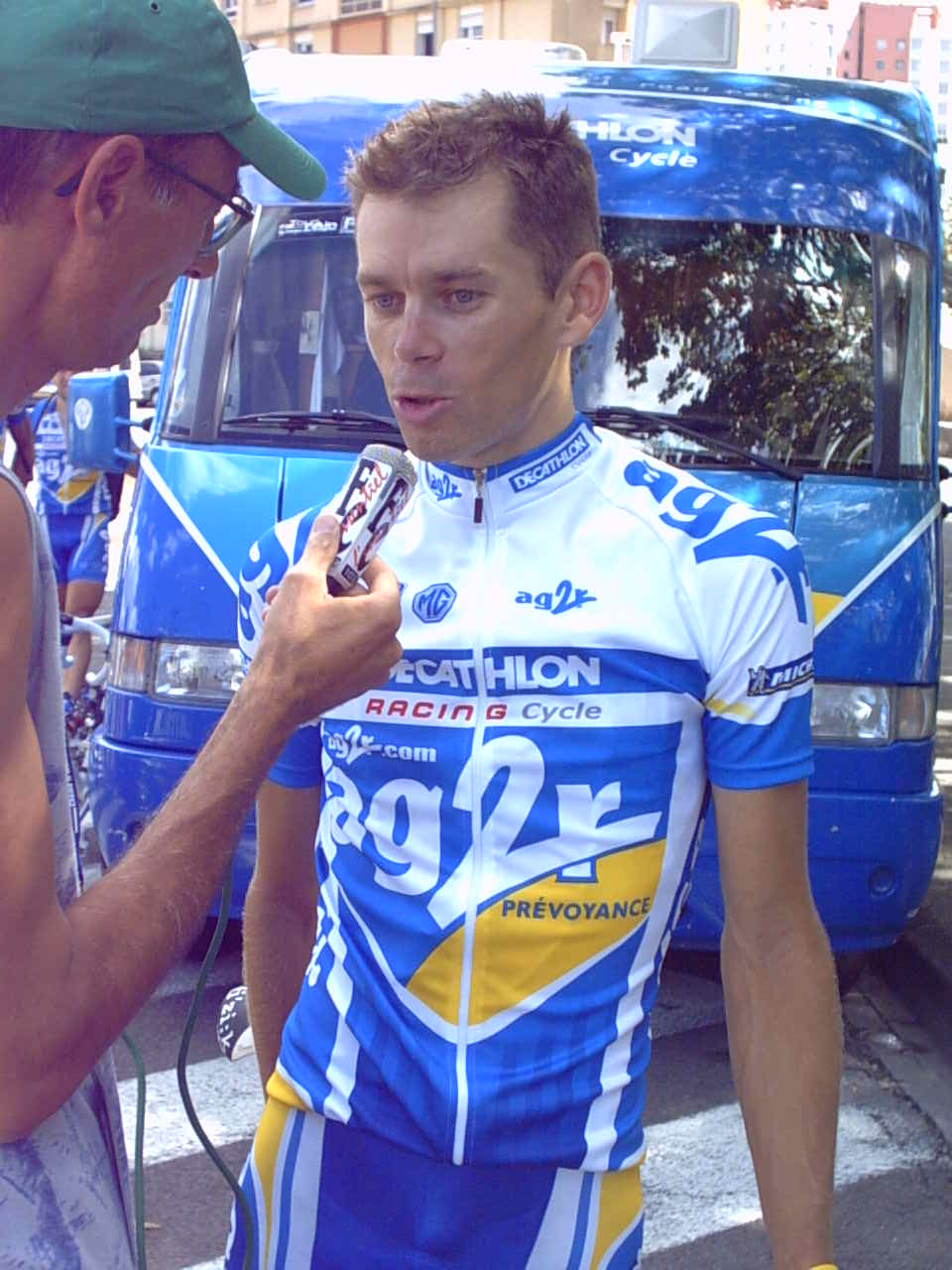

Personal information
- Born: 28 February 1973 (age 53) Oullins, France

Cycling career
- Sport: Cycling
- Current team: Retired
- Discipline: Road
- Role: Rider

Amateur team
- 1996: Casino (stagiaire)

Professional teams
- 1998-1999: Casino
- 2000-2001: Jean Delatour
- 2002-2005: AG2R Prévoyance

Christophe Oriol (born 28 February 1973) is a former French cyclist.

== Career achievements ==
=== Major results ===
1997
1st Circuit de Saône-et-Loire
1998
1st Tour des Pyrénées
1999
1st stage 1 Critérium du Dauphiné Libéré
2nd Circuit de Lorraine
2001
3rd Tour de l'Ain

1st stage 4

2002
1st Tour de l'Ain

1st stage 3

2004
3rd Polynormande

=== Grand Tour general classification results timeline ===
Grand Tour	1999	2000	2001	2002	2003	2004
Giro d'Italia	—	—	—	—	—	—
Tour de France	67	—	111	DNF	121	—
Vuelta a España	—	DNF	—	91	—	DNF

Legend
—	Did not compete
DNF	Did not finish
