= Sébastien Talabardon =

French cyclist

Personal information
- Born: 16 February 1978 (age 48)

Cycling career
- Sport: Cycling
- Role: Rider

Sébastien Talabardon (born 16 February 1978) is a French racing cyclist. He rode in the 2001 Tour de France.
