= Christophe Moreau =

French cyclist

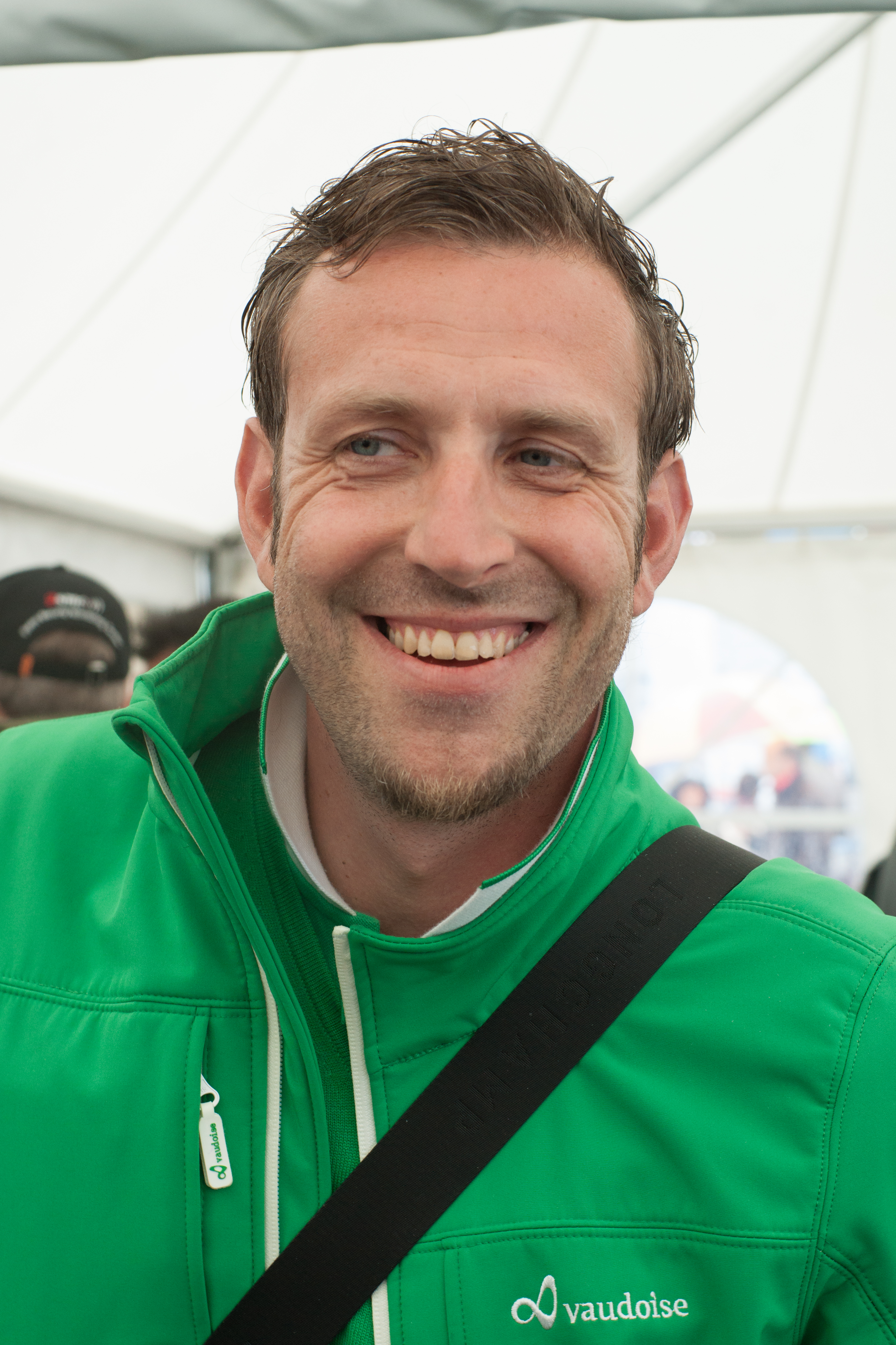
- Moreau at the 2013 Tour de Romandie

Personal information
- Full name: Christophe Moreau
- Nickname: Le chien (French - "The Dog")
- Born: 12 April 1971 (age 55) Vervins, France
- Height: 1.86 m (6 ft 1 in)
- Weight: 71 kg (157 lb; 11 st 3 lb)

Cycling career
- Sport: Cycling
- Discipline: Road
- Role: Rider
- Rider type: All-rounder

Professional teams
- 1995–2001: Festina–Lotus
- 2002–2005: Crédit Agricole
- 2006–2007: AG2R Prévoyance
- 2008–2009: Agritubel
- 2010: Caisse d'Epargne

Major wins
- Grand Tours Tour de France 1 individual stage (2001) Stage races Critérium du Dauphiné Libéré (2001, 2007) Four Days of Dunkirk (2003) One-day races and Classics National Road Race Championships (2007)

Christophe Moreau (born 12 April 1971 in Vervins) is a French former professional road racing cyclist. For many years Moreau was the primary French contender for the general classification in the Tour de France: he finished in the top 12 in the GC five times and finished the race as best Frenchman in 2000, 2003, 2004 and 2005. He also enjoyed success in the Critérium du Dauphiné Libéré, winning the race overall in 2001 and 2007.

== Early professional career ==
Moreau debuted as a professional in 1995 with Festina–Lotus. He was a time trialist early in his career which brought him the victory in the Tour de l'Avenir prologue. He finished the 1997 Tour de France in 19th place overall.

== Festina affair ==
Moreau continued his progression the following year when he won the final time trial and overall of the 1998 Critérium International. He tested positive for anabolic steroids at the 1998 Critérium du Dauphiné Libéré. Festina Team director Bruno Roussel defended Moreau by saying it was another member of the support staff who had deceived the cyclist and caused him to take the anabolic steroids. As a result of this defence which was put forward by his lawyer, Moreau was able to continue competition. But during the 1998 Tour de France, after the Festina team soigneur Willy Voet was caught at the French-Belgian border, a doping scandal was uncovered which was referred to as the Festina affair. Moreau, along with two other members of the Festina team, Laurent Brochard and Armin Meier, admitted taking EPO after being arrested and were ejected from the race. Confessing alongside the other team members - except Richard Virenque - Moreau served a six-month suspension before returning to racing.

== Post-suspension career ==
Moreau returned to the 1999 Tour de France where he placed 3rd in the stage 8 individual time trial behind American Lance Armstrong and Swiss Alex Zülle and finished the Tour in the 25th place.

In the 2000 Tour de France, Moreau finished a career best with fourth place behind Lance Armstrong, Jan Ullrich and Spanish Festina teammate Joseba Beloki. This demonstrated him as a competent climber. This was the first time he finished as highest placed French rider at the Tour and it fueled hopes that he could win the race some day. He would finish highest placed French rider in the 2003, 2004 and 2005 editions of the Tour de France.

In 2001 and still riding for Festina, Moreau won the prestigious stage race the Critérium du Dauphiné Libéré. Moreau took the lead on the fifth stage by only one second over Russian Pavel Tonkov. On the following day, both finished together second and third on the stage where there were no seconds awarded at the stage finish. Moreau withstood the many attacks of Tonkov on the final stage to win the race. Several weeks later, he won the prologue of the 2001 Tour de France and put on the yellow jersey as leader of the general classification. Moreau was presented with the yellow jersey by two podium girls. One of which he began a relationship after meeting on the Tour podium and would later marry. Moreau ended the Tour prematurely when he withdrew on the 12th stage. Festina choose to end its sponsorship of a cycling team so Moreau joined Crédit Agricole.

== Career at Crédit Agricole ==
In 2002, in his first race of the season, Moreau crashed and broke his collarbone. Moreau finished third overall in the Dauphiné Libéré behind the American teammates Lance Armstrong and Floyd Landis. In the 2002 Tour de France Moreau crashed on a descent on stage 15 and had to abandon again.

In 2003, Moreau won the Four Days of Dunkirk race before going on to finish 8th in the 2003 Tour de France. At a pre season training camp in 2004, Moreau injured his knee which delayed his return to competition. His first win of the year came in the Trophée des Grimpeurs in May. Two weeks later he won the Tour du Languedoc Roussillon stage race. In the 2004 Tour de France, he was again the best French finisher in 12th place. During the 2005 Tour de France, he went very close to wearing the yellow jersey in the first days in the Alps but fell back to finish in the 11th place. At this time his team Credit Agricole publicly expressed their dissatisfaction with his results and he left the team for AG2R Prévoyance. Moreau finished 11th overall in the 2005 Tour de France.

== Career after Crédit Agricole ==
Moreau was expected to support his new teammate Francisco "Paco" Mancebo at the 2006 Tour de France who had finished the 2005 Tour de France in fourth place. In the Critérium du Dauphiné Libéré, Moreau finished second on the general classification behind Leipheimer and won the king of the mountains competition. When the Operation Puerto doping scandal was revealed the day before the Tour began, Mancebo was banned from competing in the Tour and Moreau became the leader for the general classification. After teammate Cyril Dessel took the yellow jersey on stage 11, Moreau worked for Dessel to try to preserve Dessel's high placing. On the 19th stage Moreau attacked on the climb to bring himself further up the classification and he finished the 2006 Tour de France in the 8th place behind Dessel (Moreau was later moved up to 7th place after the disqualification of Floyd Landis).

In the latter part of his career he was considered a 'clean' rider, and told reporters in 2007 that it had a big impact on him as a racer. "For my part, I paid for what I did," he said. "All I know is that I came out of it stronger. It transformed my life."

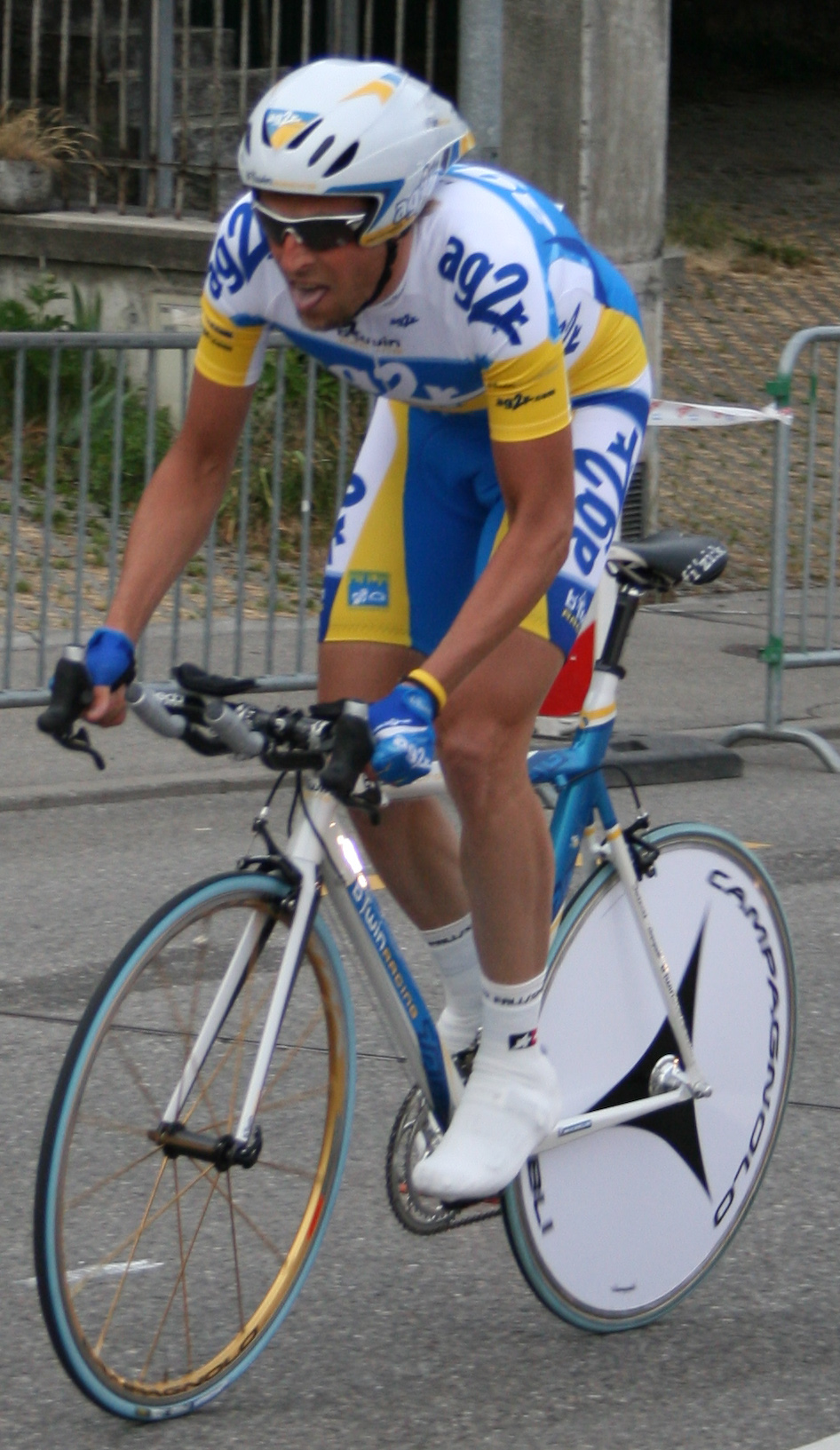

In the Critérium du Dauphiné Libéré, Moreau demonstrated great form and panache. In the second stage with 40 km to go, he attacked with several others. With 7 km to go Moreau was driving the pace with Spaniard José Antonio Redondo. At the end of the stage, Redondo did not contest the sprint as he had not been working in the break, Moreau took the stage and the leader's jersey. On the following stage 3 Individual time trial, Moreau finished some way back and lost over around 3 minutes. But on the stage to the legendary Mont Ventoux, Moreau attacked on the ascent and won the stage with over a minute on the second-place finisher and over two minutes on his rivals for the general classification. He then lay in second overall 14 seconds behind the yellow jersey which he took back on stage six to win the race. Two weeks later, he carried that same form to win the French national cycling championships. Despite being a favourite for the Individual time trial championships, Moreau finished way far back, but his form showed itself in the National cycling championships road race, in which he attacked his two breakaway companions with 40 km to the finish. He built up a great lead and won the championships with over two minutes over the second and third-place finishers. At 36 years of age, he won his first French champion title and pulled on the tricolour jersey. Moreau started the 2007 Tour de France in good form and was in the top ten of the general classification after the first mountain stages of the Alps. However, after a crash in the fifteenth stage, Moreau fell back in the general classification and rode one of the Pyrenean stages in the gruppetto, which is the part of the peloton for the riders who wish only to make the time limit imposed on a mountain stage to remain in the race.

In September 2007, Moreau, citing financial reasons, announced that he was leaving AG2R Prévoyance and was signing a one-year contract with Agritubel for the 2008 season. In the 2008 Tour de France Moreau quit the race during the 7th Stage.

On 17 July, during the 2009 Tour de France, Moreau signed with the Movistar Team team for 2010, after previously having said he would retire following the 2009 season.

== Career achievements ==
=== Major results ===
1994
2nd Team time trial, UCI Road World Championships
1995
2nd Overall Tour de l'Ain
2nd Overall Tour de l'Avenir
1996
1st Overall Vuelta Ciclista de Chile
1st Prologue Tour de l'Avenir
3rd Time trial, National Road Championships
7th Overall Route du Sud
1997
3rd Time trial, National Road Championships
3rd Overall Volta a la Comunitat Valenciana
7th Overall Critérium du Dauphiné Libéré
9th Overall Paris–Nice
1998
Route du Sud

1st Stages 1a & 1b (ITT)

1st Stage 3 (ITT) Critérium International
6th Overall Paris–Nice
1999
1st Overall Tour du Poitou-Charentes

1st Stage 4

2nd Time trial, National Road Championships
3rd Schaal Sels
3rd Chrono des Nations
6th Overall Route du Sud

1st Stage 1b

6th Overall Four Days of Dunkirk
10th Giro di Lombardia
2000
2nd Trophée des Grimpeurs

4th Overall Tour de France
4th Overall Four Days of Dunkirk
6th Overall Critérium du Dauphiné Libéré
9th Overall Grand Prix du Midi Libre

1st Stage 4 (ITT)

9th Overall Circuit de la Sarthe
9th Grand Prix d'Ouverture La Marseillaise
2001
1st Overall Critérium du Dauphiné Libéré
1st Prologue Tour de France
1st Josef Voegeli Memorial (with Florent Brard)
1st Baden–Baden (with Florent Brard)
1st Bol d'Or des Monédières
2nd Road race, National Road Championships
2nd Polynormande
3rd Overall Grand Prix du Midi Libre
8th Overall Circuit de la Sarthe
10th Overall Four Days of Dunkirk
10th Overall Étoile de Bessèges
2002
3rd Overall Critérium du Dauphiné Libéré
4th Overall Grand Prix du Midi Libre
5th Overall Four Days of Dunkirk

1st Stage 4

2003
1st Overall Four Days of Dunkirk

1st Stage 4 & 5 (ITT)

5th Overall Critérium du Dauphiné Libéré
8th Overall Tour de France
9th La Flèche Wallonne
9th Grand Prix de la Ville de Lillers
9th Trophée des Grimpeurs
2004
1st Overall Tour du Languedoc-Roussillon

1st Stage 4

1st Trophée des Grimpeurs
2nd Time trial, National Road Championships
2nd Bordeaux–Caudéran
2005
1st Bordeaux–Caudéran
2nd Overall Tour du Poitou-Charentes
3rd Overall Four Days of Dunkirk
9th Overall Volta a Catalunya
2006
2nd Overall Critérium du Dauphiné Libéré

1st Mountains classification
1st Combination classification

3rd Overall Volta a Catalunya

1st Mountains classification

7th Overall Tour de France
7th Overall Circuit de la Sarthe
2007
1st Road race, National Road Championships
1st Overall Critérium du Dauphiné Libéré

1st Combination classification
1st Stages 2 & 4 (Mont Ventoux)

1st Bordeaux–Caudéran
4th Overall Volta a Catalunya
2008
2nd Overall Route du Sud
2nd Overall Vuelta a Andalucía
2009
4th Overall Volta ao Alentejo
5th GP Triberg-Schwarzwald
2010
5th Overall Tour du Limousin

==== General classification results timeline ====
Grand Tour general classification results
| Grand Tour | 1995 | 1996 | 1997 | 1998 | 1999 | 2000 | 2001 | 2002 | 2003 | 2004 | 2005 | 2006 | 2007 | 2008 | 2009 | 2010 |
| Giro d'Italia | did not contest during his career | | | | | | | | | | | | | | | |
| Tour de France | — | 75 | 19 | DNF | 27 | 4 | DNF | DNF | 8 | 12 | 11 | 7 | 36 | DNF | 27 | 20 |
| / Vuelta a España | did not contest during his career | | | | | | | | | | | | | | | |
Major stage race general classification results
| Race | 1995 | 1996 | 1997 | 1998 | 1999 | 2000 | 2001 | 2002 | 2003 | 2004 | 2005 | 2006 | 2007 | 2008 | 2009 | 2010 |
| / Paris–Nice | 28 | — | 9 | 6 | — | — | — | — | — | — | — | DSQ | — | 15 | 11 | — |
| / Tirreno–Adriatico | did not contest during his career | | | | | | | | | | | | | | | |
| Volta a Catalunya | — | — | — | — | — | — | — | — | — | — | 9 | 3 | 4 | 42 | — | — |
| Tour of the Basque Country | 91 | — | — | — | — | — | — | — | — | — | — | — | — | — | — | — |
| / Tour de Romandie | — | — | — | — | — | — | — | — | — | — | — | 35 | 14 | — | — | 11 |
| Critérium du Dauphiné | — | DNF | 7 | 17 | 29 | 6 | 1 | 3 | 5 | DNF | DNF | 2 | 1 | — | — | 23 |
| Tour de Suisse | did not contest during his career | | | | | | | | | | | | | | | |

== See also ==
- List of doping cases in cycling
- List of sportspeople sanctioned for doping offences
