= François Simon (cyclist) =

French cyclist (born 1968)

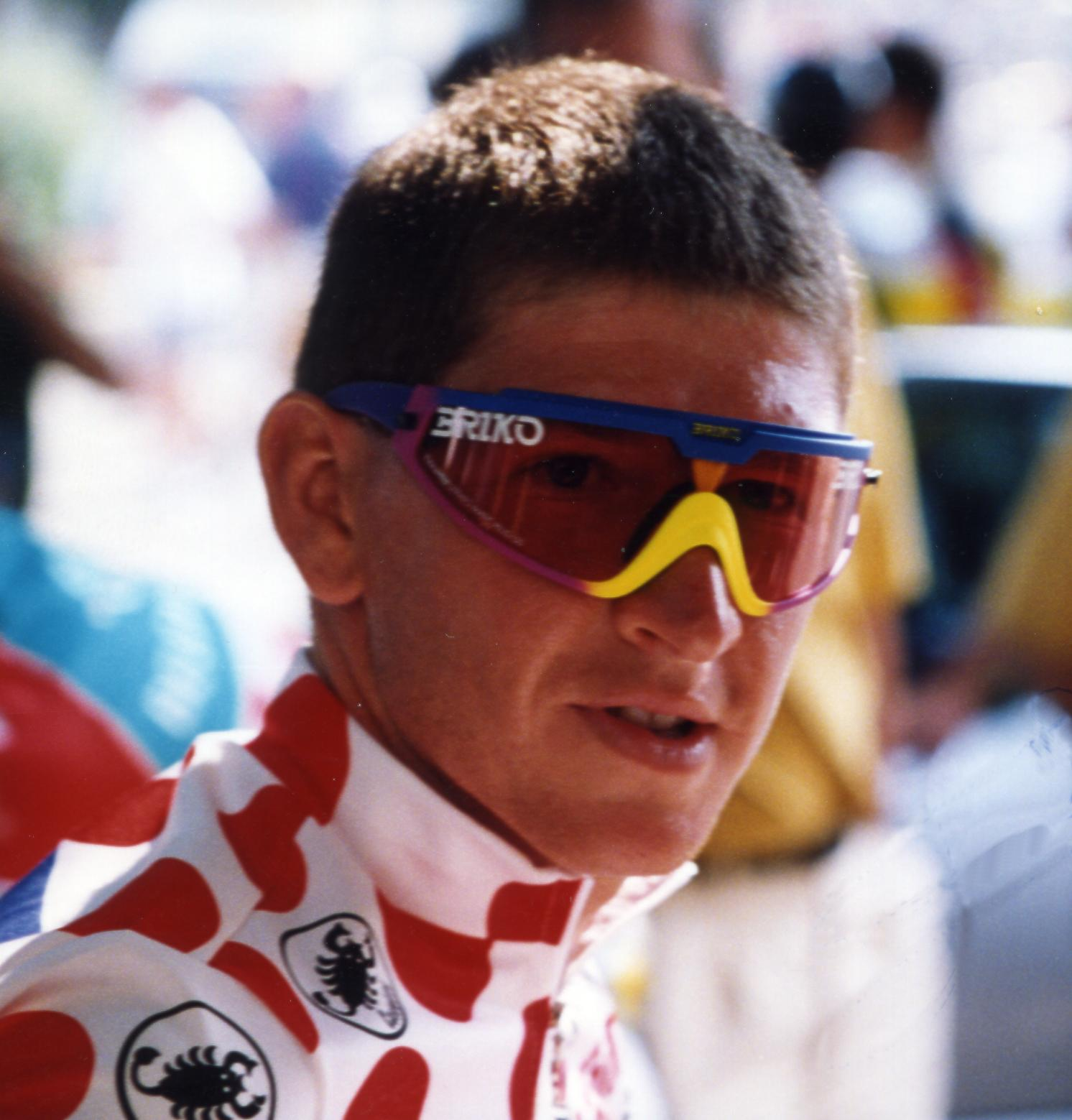
- Simon at the 1993 Tour de France

Personal information
- Full name: François Simon
- Born: 28 October 1968 (age 57) Troyes, France
- Height: 1.72 m (5 ft 8 in)
- Weight: 62 kg (137 lb; 9 st 11 lb)

Cycling career
- Sport: Cycling
- Discipline: Road
- Role: Rider

Professional teams
- 1991–1995: Castorama–Raleigh
- 1996–1999: GAN
- 2000–2002: Bonjour

Major wins
- Grand Tours Giro d'Italia 1 individual stage (1992) One-Day Races and Classics National Road Race Championship (1999)

François Simon (French pronunciation: [fʁɑ̃swa simɔ̃]; born 28 October 1968 in Troyes, France) is a French former professional road bicycle racer. He was professional from 1991 to 2002. He is the brother of Régis, Pascal and Jérôme, all professional cyclists. In the 2001 Tour de France, Simon wore the yellow jersey as leader of the general classification for three days and finished as best French finisher in that Tour. Other career highlights include a stage win in the 1992 Giro d'Italia, two stage wins in the Tour de l'Avenir, stage wins in Circuit de la Sarthe, Critérium du Dauphiné Libéré and Paris–Nice as well as being road race champion of France in 1999.

== Major results ==
1991
6th Grand Prix d'Isbergues
9th Trophée des Grimpeurs
9th Giro dell'Etna
1992
1st Stage 15 Giro d'Italia
1st Overall Mi-Août Bretonne
1st Stage 3 Tour du Poitou Charentes et de la Vienne
2nd Overall Tour de l'Avenir

1st Stages 5 & 11 (ITT)

7th Trophée des Grimpeurs
1993
2nd Overall Tour du Poitou Charentes et de la Vienne

1st Stage 1

2nd Overall Tour de l'Avenir
2nd GP de la Ville de Rennes
4th Overall Ronde van Nederland
4th Overall Tour d'Armorique
7th Cholet-Pays de Loire
8th GP de Denain
9th A Travers le Morbihan
1994
2nd A Travers le Morbihan
3rd Grand Prix d'Ouverture La Marseillaise
5th Overall Grand Prix du Midi Libre
6th GP du canton d'Argovie
9th Trophée des Grimpeurs
1995
3rd Overall Étoile de Bessèges
8th Trophée des Grimpeurs
8th GP de la Ville de Rennes
1996
1st Stage 2 Critérium du Dauphiné Libéré
4th Tour de Vendée
8th Grand Prix d'Ouverture La Marseillaise
10th Overall Circuit Cycliste Sarthe

1st Stage 4b

10th Classic Haribo
1997
3rd Overall Route du Sud
5th Paris–Camembert
6th Overall Critérium du Dauphiné Libéré
9th Overall Grand Prix du Midi Libre
9th Grand Prix de la Ville de Lillers
1998
5th Grand Prix de Villers-Cotterêts
7th Overall Rheinland-Pfalz Rundfahrt
9th Overall Volta a la Comunitat Valenciana
1999
1st Road race, National Road Championships
1st Châteauroux Classic
5th Overall Grand Prix du Midi Libre
5th Grand Prix de Wallonie
9th Overall Critérium du Dauphiné Libéré
9th GP de la Ville de Rennes
10th Overall Critérium International
2000
1st Ronde d'Aix-en-Provence
4th Overall Paris–Nice

1st Stage 5

2001
1st Mountains classification, Tour Méditerranéen
6th Overall Tour de France

Held for three days

9th Tour du Finistère
10th Overall Grand Prix du Midi Libre
2002
8th Overall Circuit Cycliste de la Sarthe
9th Tour de la Somme

=== Grand Tour general classification results timeline ===
Grand Tour	1992	1993	1994	1995	1996	1997	1998	1999	2000	2001	2002
Giro d'Italia	61	—	—	32	—	—	—	—	—	—	—
Tour de France	—	57	43	59	86	32	57	30	58	6	DNF
Vuelta a España	—	—	—	—	—	DNF	—	—	—	—	—
