= Rik Verbrugghe =

Belgian cyclist

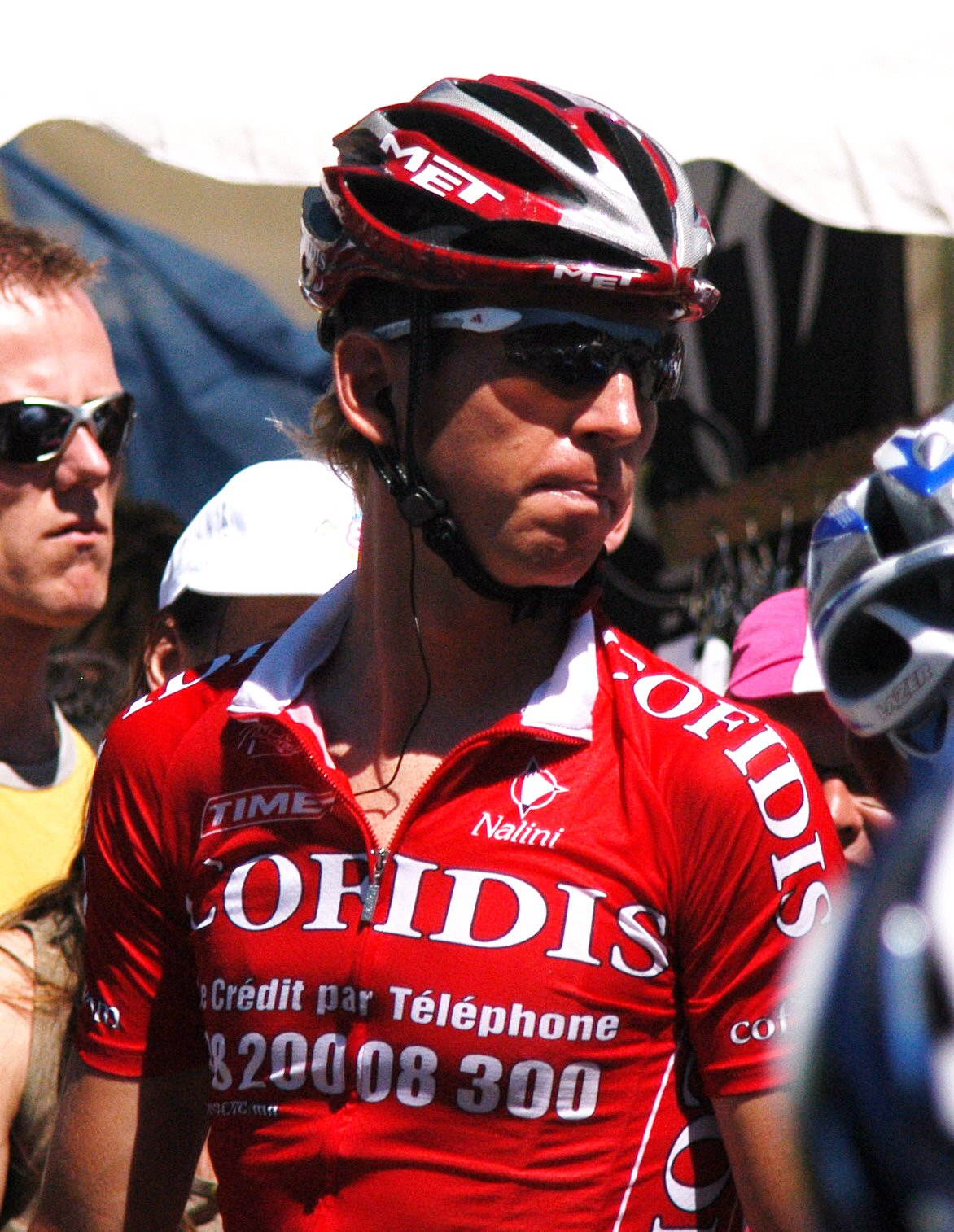

Personal information
- Full name: Rik Verbrugghe
- Born: 23 July 1974 (age 52) Tienen, Belgium

Cycling career
- Sport: Cycling
- Current team: Retired
- Discipline: Road
- Role: Rider

Professional teams
- 1996–2004: Lotto
- 2005: QuickStep-Innergetic
- 2006–2008: Cofidis

Major wins
- Flèche Wallonne (2001); Giro d'Italia, 3 stages (2001-2002-2006); Tour de France, 1 stage (2001); Tour de Romandie, 1 stage (2002); Eneco Tour, 1 stage (2005)

Rik Verbrugghe (born 23 July 1974) is a Belgian former professional road racing cyclist.

Verbrugghe was born in Tienen, Flemish Brabant. In 1996, he turned professional, and he has since become a Belgian time trial champion, competed in the 2000 Summer Olympics, won a stage at the Tour de France, three stages at the Giro d'Italia, and the one-day Ardennes classics–La Flèche Wallonne, and the overall and two stages of the Critérium International. In 2008 he announced his retirement, and subsequent role as team director at Quick Step during the 2009 and 2010 seasons. In 2011 he became team director at BMC Racing Team.

== Teams and major results ==
1996 – Lotto-Isoglass
1997 – Lotto-Mobistar
1998 – Lotto-Mobistar
1999 – Lotto-Mobistar
2nd, Clásica de San Sebastián
2000 – Lotto-Adecco
1st (Belgium) Belgian National Time Trial Championships
2nd, La Flèche Wallonne
2001 – Lotto-Adecco
La Flèche Wallonne
Overall, Critérium International

Stage 1
Stage 3

Stage 15 – Tour de France
Prologue – Giro d'Italia
Criterium Peer
Criterium Maastricht
2002 – Lotto-Adecco
Stage 7 – Giro d'Italia
9th, Overall – Giro d'Italia
Prologue – Tour de Romandie
2003 – Lotto-Domo
3rd, Overall – Paris-Corrèze
2004 – Lotto-Domo
5th, Overall – Tour of Belgium
2005 – Quick Step-Davitamon
Prologue –Eneco Tour, 5 days in leader's red jersey
Grand Prix de Lugano
2006 – Cofidis
Stage 7 – Giro d'Italia
