= Alexei Sivakov =

Russian cyclist

Personal information
- Full name: Alexei Viktorovich Sivakov
- Born: 7 January 1972 (age 54) Moscow, Russia

Cycling career
- Sport: Cycling
- Current team: Retired
- Discipline: Road
- Role: Rider

Professional teams
- 1996–1997: Roslotto–ZG Mobili
- 1998–2003: BigMat–Auber 93
- 2004: Hoop–CCC–Polsat
- 2005: Auber 93

Alexei Viktorovich Sivakov (Russian: Алексей Викторович Сиваков) (born 7 January 1972) is a former Russian cyclist. He is the father of fellow cyclist Pavel Sivakov.

== Palmares ==
1994
1st Overall Tour de Serbie
1996
4th National Road Race Championships
1998
1st Overall Circuito Montañés

1st Stages 1 & 2

2nd National Time Trial Championships
4th Grand Prix de Villers-Cotterêts
2000
3rd National Road Race Championships
2003
2nd Overall Circuit de la Sarthe
