= Gennady Mikhaylov =

Russian cyclist

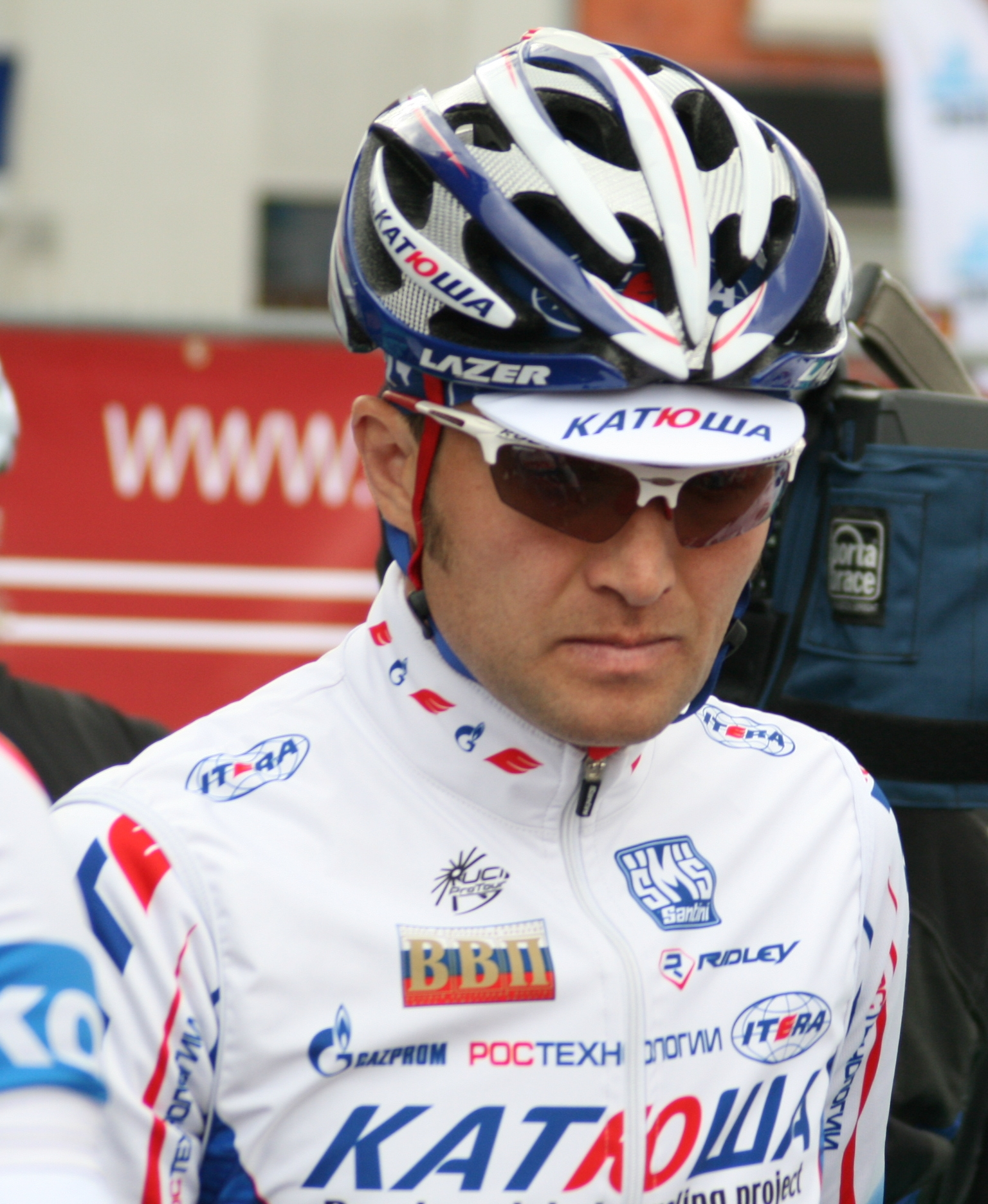

Personal information
- Full name: Gennady Mikhaylov; Геннадий Михайлов
- Born: February 8, 1974 (age 52) Cheboksary, Russia
- Height: 1.88 m (6 ft 2 in)
- Weight: 74 kg (163 lb)

Cycling career
- Sport: Cycling
- Current team: Retired
- Discipline: Road
- Role: Rider

Professional teams
- 1996–1998: Lada-CSKA
- 2000: Farm Fites
- 2001–2002: Lotto–Adecco
- 2003–2006: U.S. Postal Service
- 2007: Astana
- 2008: Mitsubishi-Jartazi
- 2009: Team Katusha

Gennady Mikhaylov (Russian: Геннадий Михайлов, born 8 February 1974 in Cheboksary, Chuvash ASSR), is a former professional road bicycle racer from Russia. He last rode for UCI ProTour Team Katusha. He was part of the successful team Lotto–Adecco, in which he assisted Robbie McEwen to numerous sprint victories. He won his first professional race in 2002. Before joining Astana for the 2007 season, he spent four years with U.S. Postal Service, from 2003 until 2006.

== Major results ==
1996 - Lada-CSKA
Vuelta a Navarra - Stage 2
2002 - Lotto-Domo
Tour de Luxembourg - Stage 5
2004 - U.S. Postal Service
8th overall – Tour de l'Ain
