= 1997 Tour de France, Stage 11 to Stage 21 =

Cycling race results

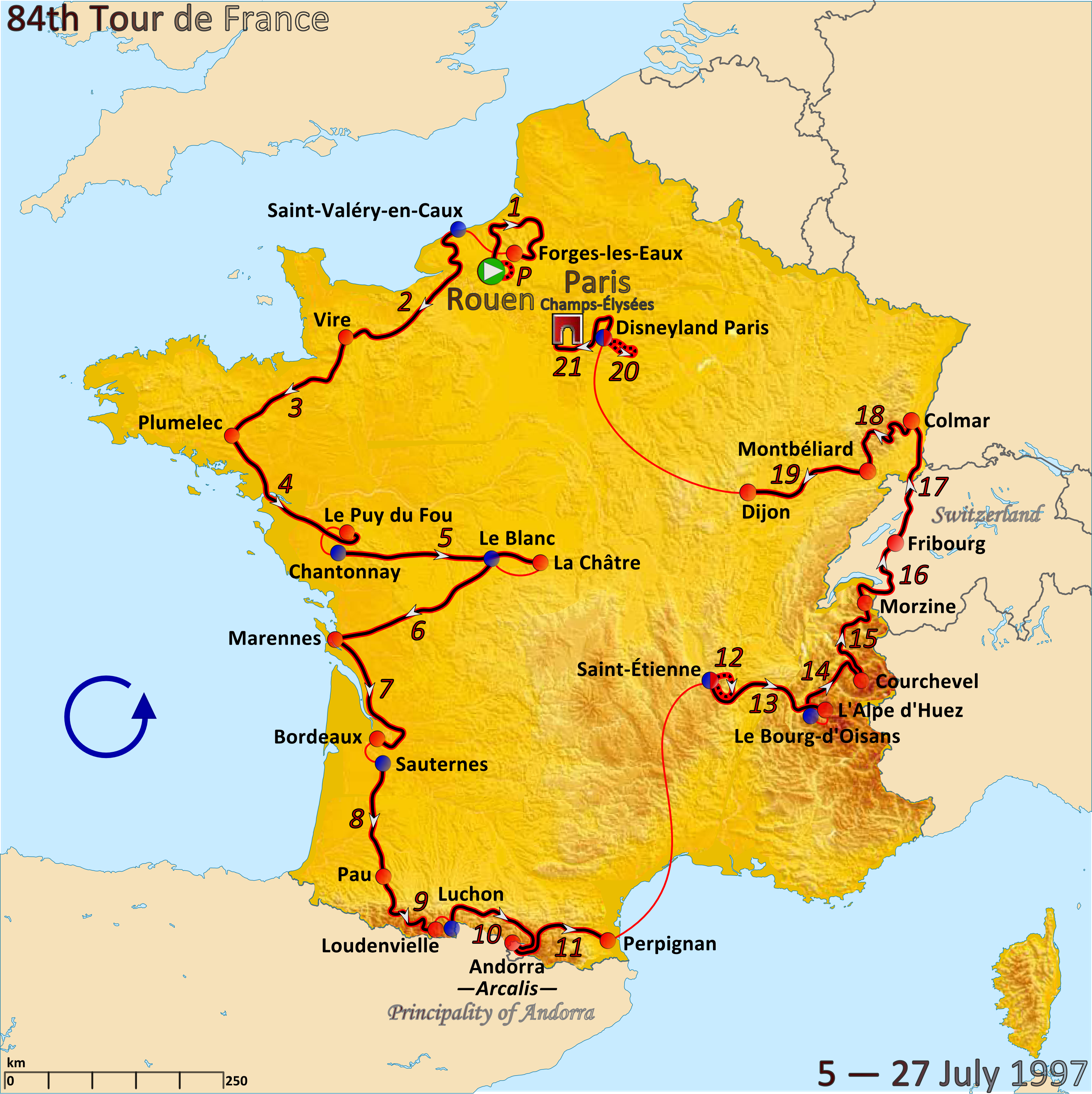
Route of the 1997 Tour de France

The 1997 Tour de France was the 84th edition of Tour de France, one of cycling's Grand Tours. The Tour began in Rouen with a prologue individual time trial on 5 July and Stage 11 occurred on 16 July with a hilly stage from Andorra Arcalis. The race finished on the Champs-Élysées in Paris on 27 July.

== Stage 11 ==
16 July 1997 — Andorra Arcalis to Perpignan, 192 km (119.3 mi)

Stage 11 result

Rank	Rider	Team	Time
1	Laurent Desbiens (FRA)	Cofidis	5h 05' 05"
2	Carlo Finco (ITA)	MG Maglificio–Technogym	s.t.
3	Serhiy Ushakov (UKR)	Team Polti	s.t.
4	Frédéric Moncassin (FRA)	GAN	+ 18"
5	Erik Zabel (GER)	Team Telekom	s.t.
6	Mario Traversoni (ITA)	Mercatone Uno	s.t.
7	Fabio Baldato (ITA)	MG Maglificio–Technogym	s.t.
8	Frankie Andreu (USA)	Cofidis	s.t.
9	Adriano Baffi (ITA)	U.S. Postal Service	s.t.
10	Gianluca Pierobon (ITA)	Batik–Del Monte	s.t.

General classification after stage 11

Rank	Rider	Team	Time
1	Jan Ullrich (GER)	Team Telekom	60h 06' 17"
2	Richard Virenque (FRA)	Festina–Lotus	+ 2' 38"
3	Abraham Olano (ESP)	Banesto	+ 4' 46"
4	Bjarne Riis (DEN)	Team Telekom	+ 4' 53"
5	Marco Pantani (ITA)	Mercatone Uno	+ 5' 29"
6	Fernando Escartín (ESP)	Kelme–Costa Blanca	+ 5' 46"
7	Laurent Dufaux (SUI)	Festina–Lotus	+ 6' 02"
8	Oscar Camenzind (SUI)	Mapei–GB	+ 7' 00"
9	Francesco Casagrande (ITA)	Saeco–Estro	+ 7' 20"
10	Cédric Vasseur (FRA)	GAN	+ 7' 31"

== Stage 12 ==
18 July 1997 — Saint-Étienne, 55.5 km (34.5 mi) (ITT)

Stage 12 result

Rank	Rider	Team	Time
1	Jan Ullrich (GER)	Team Telekom	1h 16' 24"
2	Richard Virenque (FRA)	Festina–Lotus	+ 3' 04"
3	Bjarne Riis (DEN)	Team Telekom	+ 3' 08"
4	Abraham Olano (ESP)	Banesto	+ 3' 14"
5	Marco Pantani (ITA)	Mercatone Uno	+ 3' 42"
6	Francesco Casagrande (ITA)	Saeco–Estro	+ 3' 56"
7	Frank Vandenbroucke (BEL)	Mapei–GB	+ 4' 44"
8	Zenon Jaskuła (POL)	Mapei–GB	+ 4' 50"
9	Beat Zberg (SUI)	Mercatone Uno	+ 5' 00"
10	Michael Boogerd (NED)	Rabobank	+ 5' 04"

General classification after stage 12

Rank	Rider	Team	Time
1	Jan Ullrich (GER)	Team Telekom	61h 22' 41"
2	Richard Virenque (FRA)	Festina–Lotus	+ 5' 42"
3	Abraham Olano (ESP)	Banesto	+ 8' 00"
4	Bjarne Riis (DEN)	Team Telekom	+ 8' 01"
5	Marco Pantani (ITA)	Mercatone Uno	+ 9' 11"
6	Fernando Escartín (ESP)	Kelme–Costa Blanca	+ 11' 09"
7	Francesco Casagrande (ITA)	Saeco–Estro	+ 11' 16"
8	Laurent Dufaux (SUI)	Festina–Lotus	+ 12' 28"
9	Oscar Camenzind (SUI)	Mapei–GB	+ 13' 15"
10	Pascal Lino (FRA)	GAN	+ 14' 16"

== Stage 13 ==
19 July 1997 — Saint-Étienne to Alpe d'Huez, 203.5 km (126.4 mi)

Stage 13 result

Rank	Rider	Team	Time
1	Marco Pantani (ITA)	Mercatone Uno	5h 02' 42"
2	Jan Ullrich (GER)	Team Telekom	+ 47"
3	Richard Virenque (FRA)	Festina–Lotus	+ 1' 27"
4	Francesco Casagrande (ITA)	Saeco–Estro	+ 2' 27"
5	Bjarne Riis (DEN)	Team Telekom	+ 2' 28"
6	Beat Zberg (SUI)	Mercatone Uno	+ 2' 59"
7	Udo Bölts (GER)	Team Telekom	s.t.
8	Roberto Conti (ITA)	Mercatone Uno	s.t.
9	Laurent Madouas (FRA)	Lotto–Mobistar–Isoglass	s.t.
10	Laurent Jalabert (FRA)	ONCE	+ 3' 22"

General classification after stage 13

Rank	Rider	Team	Time
1	Jan Ullrich (GER)	Team Telekom	66h 26' 10"
2	Richard Virenque (FRA)	Festina–Lotus	+ 6' 22"
3	Marco Pantani (ITA)	Mercatone Uno	+ 8' 24"
4	Bjarne Riis (DEN)	Team Telekom	+ 9' 42"
5	Abraham Olano (ESP)	Banesto	+ 10' 38"
6	Francesco Casagrande (ITA)	Saeco–Estro	+ 12' 56"
7	Fernando Escartín (ESP)	Kelme–Costa Blanca	+ 14' 36"
8	Oscar Camenzind (SUI)	Mapei–GB	+ 16' 59"
9	José María Jiménez (ESP)	Banesto	+ 18' 32"
10	Laurent Dufaux (SUI)	Festina–Lotus	+ 18' 46"

== Stage 14 ==
20 July 1997 — Le Bourg-d'Oisans to Courchevel, 148 km (92 mi)

Stage 14 result

Rank	Rider	Team	Time
1	Richard Virenque (FRA)	Festina–Lotus	4h 34' 16"
2	Jan Ullrich (GER)	Team Telekom	s.t.
3	Fernando Escartín (ESP)	Kelme–Costa Blanca	+ 47"
4	Laurent Dufaux (SUI)	Festina–Lotus	+ 1' 19"
5	Bjarne Riis (DEN)	Team Telekom	+ 1' 24"
6	Marco Pantani (ITA)	Mercatone Uno	+ 3' 06"
7	Francesco Casagrande (ITA)	Saeco–Estro	+ 3' 36"
8	José María Jiménez (ESP)	Banesto	+ 3' 50"
9	Abraham Olano (ESP)	Banesto	s.t.
10	Roberto Conti (ITA)	Mercatone Uno	+ 4' 41"

General classification after stage 14

Rank	Rider	Team	Time
1	Jan Ullrich (GER)	Team Telekom	71h 00' 26"
2	Richard Virenque (FRA)	Festina–Lotus	+ 6' 22"
3	Bjarne Riis (DEN)	Team Telekom	+ 11' 06"
4	Marco Pantani (ITA)	Mercatone Uno	+ 11' 30"
5	Abraham Olano (ESP)	Banesto	+ 14' 28"
6	Fernando Escartín (ESP)	Kelme–Costa Blanca	+ 15' 23"
7	Francesco Casagrande (ITA)	Saeco–Estro	+ 16' 32"
8	Laurent Dufaux (SUI)	Festina–Lotus	+ 20' 05"
9	José María Jiménez (ESP)	Banesto	+ 22' 22"
10	Roberto Conti (ITA)	Mercatone Uno	+ 25' 39"

== Stage 15 ==
21 July 1997 — Courchevel to Morzine, 208.5 km (129.6 mi)

Stage 15 result

Rank	Rider	Team	Time
1	Marco Pantani (ITA)	Mercatone Uno	5h 57' 16"
2	Richard Virenque (FRA)	Festina–Lotus	+ 1' 17"
3	Jan Ullrich (GER)	Team Telekom	s.t.
4	Beat Zberg (SUI)	Mercatone Uno	+ 1' 59"
5	Francesco Casagrande (ITA)	Saeco–Estro	s.t.
6	Bobby Julich (USA)	Cofidis	s.t.
7	Fernando Escartín (ESP)	Kelme–Costa Blanca	s.t.
8	Bjarne Riis (DEN)	Team Telekom	+ 2' 06"
9	José María Jiménez (ESP)	Banesto	+ 2' 37"
10	Oscar Camenzind (SUI)	Mapei–GB	+ 3' 29"

General classification after stage 15

Rank	Rider	Team	Time
1	Jan Ullrich (GER)	Team Telekom	76h 58' 59"
2	Richard Virenque (FRA)	Festina–Lotus	+ 6' 22"
3	Marco Pantani (ITA)	Mercatone Uno	+ 10' 13"
4	Bjarne Riis (DEN)	Team Telekom	+ 11' 55"
5	Fernando Escartín (ESP)	Kelme–Costa Blanca	+ 16' 05"
6	Abraham Olano (ESP)	Banesto	+ 16' 40"
7	Francesco Casagrande (ITA)	Saeco–Estro	+ 17' 14"
8	José María Jiménez (ESP)	Banesto	+ 23' 42"
9	Roberto Conti (ITA)	Mercatone Uno	+ 28' 20"
10	Laurent Dufaux (SUI)	Festina–Lotus	+ 29' 46"

== Stage 16 ==
22 July 1997 — Morzine to Fribourg (Switzerland), 181 km (112 mi)

Stage 16 result

Rank	Rider	Team	Time
1	Christophe Mengin (FRA)	Française des Jeux	4h 30' 11"
2	Frank Vandenbroucke (BEL)	Mapei–GB	s.t.
3	Richard Virenque (FRA)	Festina–Lotus	s.t.
4	Gianluca Pierobon (ITA)	Batik–Del Monte	s.t.
5	Laurent Dufaux (SUI)	Festina–Lotus	s.t.
6	Francesco Casagrande (ITA)	Saeco–Estro	s.t.
7	Abraham Olano (ESP)	Banesto	s.t.
8	Udo Bölts (GER)	Team Telekom	s.t.
9	Marco Pantani (ITA)	Mercatone Uno	s.t.
10	Orlando Rodrigues (POR)	Banesto	s.t.

General classification after stage 16

Rank	Rider	Team	Time
1	Jan Ullrich (GER)	Team Telekom	81h 29' 10"
2	Richard Virenque (FRA)	Festina–Lotus	+ 6' 22"
3	Marco Pantani (ITA)	Mercatone Uno	+ 10' 13"
4	Fernando Escartín (ESP)	Kelme–Costa Blanca	+ 16' 05"
5	Abraham Olano (ESP)	Banesto	+ 16' 40"
6	Francesco Casagrande (ITA)	Saeco–Estro	+ 17' 14"
7	Bjarne Riis (DEN)	Team Telekom	+ 18' 07"
8	José María Jiménez (ESP)	Banesto	+ 23' 42"
9	Roberto Conti (ITA)	Mercatone Uno	+ 28' 20"
10	Laurent Dufaux (SUI)	Festina–Lotus	+ 29' 46"

== Stage 17 ==
23 July 1997 — Fribourg (Switzerland) to Colmar, 218.5 km (135.8 mi)

Stage 17 result

Rank	Rider	Team	Time
1	Neil Stephens (AUS)	Festina–Lotus	4h 54' 38"
2	Oscar Camenzind (SUI)	Mapei–GB	+ 3"
3	Viatcheslav Ekimov (RUS)	U.S. Postal Service	s.t.
4	Laurent Roux (FRA)	TVM–Farm Frites	s.t.
5	Erik Dekker (NED)	Rabobank	s.t.
6	Javier Pascual Rodríguez (ESP)	Kelme–Costa Blanca	s.t.
7	Bobby Julich (USA)	Cofidis	s.t.
8	Serhiy Ushakov (UKR)	Team Polti	s.t.
9	Peter Farazijn (BEL)	Lotto–Mobistar–Isoglass	s.t.
10	Christophe Mengin (FRA)	Française des Jeux	s.t.

General classification after stage 17

Rank	Rider	Team	Time
1	Jan Ullrich (GER)	Team Telekom	86h 27' 46"
2	Richard Virenque (FRA)	Festina–Lotus	+ 6' 22"
3	Marco Pantani (ITA)	Mercatone Uno	+ 10' 13"
4	Fernando Escartín (ESP)	Kelme–Costa Blanca	+ 16' 05"
5	Abraham Olano (ESP)	Banesto	+ 16' 40"
6	Francesco Casagrande (ITA)	Saeco–Estro	+ 17' 14"
7	Bjarne Riis (DEN)	Team Telekom	+ 18' 07"
8	José María Jiménez (ESP)	Banesto	+ 23' 42"
9	Roberto Conti (ITA)	Mercatone Uno	+ 28' 20"
10	Laurent Dufaux (SUI)	Festina–Lotus	+ 29' 26"

== Stage 18 ==
24 July 1997 — Colmar to Montbéliard, 175.5 km (109.1 mi)

Stage 18 result

Rank	Rider	Team	Time
1	Didier Rous (FRA)	Festina–Lotus	4h 24' 38"
2	Pascal Hervé (FRA)	Festina–Lotus	+ 5' 09"
3	Bobby Julich (USA)	Cofidis	+ 5' 10"
4	Laurent Roux (FRA)	TVM–Farm Frites	s.t.
5	Ángel Casero (ESP)	Banesto	s.t.
6	Javier Pascual Rodríguez (ESP)	Kelme–Costa Blanca	s.t.
7	Laurent Dufaux (SUI)	Festina–Lotus	+ 5' 12"
8	Daniele Nardello (ITA)	Mapei–GB	+ 5' 14"
9	Manuel Beltrán (ESP)	Banesto	s.t.
10	Laurent Madouas (FRA)	Lotto–Mobistar–Isoglass	+ 5' 16"

General classification after stage 18

Rank	Rider	Team	Time
1	Jan Ullrich (GER)	Team Telekom	90h 58' 03"
2	Richard Virenque (FRA)	Festina–Lotus	+ 6' 22"
3	Marco Pantani (ITA)	Mercatone Uno	+ 10' 13"
4	Fernando Escartín (ESP)	Kelme–Costa Blanca	+ 16' 05"
5	Abraham Olano (ESP)	Banesto	+ 16' 40"
6	Francesco Casagrande (ITA)	Saeco–Estro	+ 17' 14"
7	Bjarne Riis (DEN)	Team Telekom	+ 18' 07"
8	José María Jiménez (ESP)	Banesto	+ 23' 42"
9	Roberto Conti (ITA)	Mercatone Uno	+ 28' 20"
10	Laurent Dufaux (SUI)	Festina–Lotus	+ 29' 29"

== Stage 19 ==
25 July 1997 — Montbéliard to Dijon, 172 km (107 mi)

Stage 19 result

Rank	Rider	Team	Time
1	Mario Traversoni (ITA)	Mercatone Uno	4h 03' 43"
2	François Simon (FRA)	GAN	s.t.
3	Marco Saligari (ITA)	Casino	s.t.
4	Christian Henn (GER)	Team Telekom	s.t.
5	Viatcheslav Ekimov (RUS)	U.S. Postal Service	s.t.
6	Thierry Bourguignon (FRA)	BigMat–Auber 93	s.t.
7	Erik Dekker (NED)	Rabobank	s.t.
8	Servais Knaven (NED)	TVM–Farm Frites	s.t.
9	Serhiy Ushakov (UKR)	Team Polti	s.t.
10	Bart Voskamp (NED)	Lotto–Mobistar–Isoglass	(Note: Relegated) 4h 03' 17"

General classification after stage 19

Rank	Rider	Team	Time
1	Jan Ullrich (GER)	Team Telekom	95h 19' 17"
2	Richard Virenque (FRA)	Festina–Lotus	+ 6' 22"
3	Marco Pantani (ITA)	Mercatone Uno	+ 10' 13"
4	Fernando Escartín (ESP)	Kelme–Costa Blanca	+ 16' 05"
5	Abraham Olano (ESP)	Banesto	+ 16' 40"
6	Francesco Casagrande (ITA)	Saeco–Estro	+ 17' 14"
7	Bjarne Riis (DEN)	Team Telekom	+ 18' 07"
8	José María Jiménez (ESP)	Banesto	+ 23' 42"
9	Roberto Conti (ITA)	Mercatone Uno	+ 28' 20"
10	Laurent Dufaux (SUI)	Festina–Lotus	+ 29' 29"

== Stage 20 ==
26 July 1997 — Disneyland Paris, 63 km (39 mi) (ITT)

Stage 20 result

Rank	Rider	Team	Time
1	Abraham Olano (ESP)	Banesto	1h 15' 57"
2	Jan Ullrich (GER)	Team Telekom	+ 45"
3	Philippe Gaumont (FRA)	Cofidis	+ 1' 12"
4	Bobby Julich (USA)	Cofidis	+ 2' 24"
5	Erik Dekker (NED)	Rabobank	+ 2' 39"
6	Christophe Moreau (FRA)	Festina–Lotus	+ 2' 56"
7	Laurent Brochard (FRA)	Festina–Lotus	+ 3' 10"
8	Laurent Dufaux (SUI)	Festina–Lotus	+ 3' 11"
9	Richard Virenque (FRA)	Festina–Lotus	+ 3' 32"
10	Artūras Kasputis (LTU)	Casino	+ 3' 48"

General classification after stage 20

Rank	Rider	Team	Time
1	Jan Ullrich (GER)	Team Telekom	96h 35' 59"
2	Richard Virenque (FRA)	Festina–Lotus	+ 9' 09"
3	Marco Pantani (ITA)	Mercatone Uno	+ 14' 03"
4	Abraham Olano (ESP)	Banesto	+ 15' 55"
5	Fernando Escartín (ESP)	Kelme–Costa Blanca	+ 20' 32"
6	Francesco Casagrande (ITA)	Saeco–Estro	+ 22' 47"
7	Bjarne Riis (DEN)	Team Telekom	+ 26' 34"
8	José María Jiménez (ESP)	Banesto	+ 31' 17"
9	Laurent Dufaux (SUI)	Festina–Lotus	+ 31' 55"
10	Roberto Conti (ITA)	Mercatone Uno	+ 32' 26"

== Stage 21 ==
27 July 1997 — Disneyland Paris to Paris Champs-Élysées, 149.5 km (92.9 mi)

Stage 21 result

Rank	Rider	Team	Time
1	Nicola Minali (ITA)	Batik–Del Monte	3h 54' 36"
2	Erik Zabel (GER)	Team Telekom	s.t.
3	Henk Vogels (AUS)	GAN	s.t.
4	Jeroen Blijlevens (NED)	TVM–Farm Frites	s.t.
5	George Hincapie (USA)	U.S. Postal Service	s.t.
6	Robbie McEwen (AUS)	Rabobank	s.t.
7	Lauri Aus (EST)	Casino	s.t.
8	Nicola Loda (ITA)	MG Maglificio–Technogym	s.t.
9	Philippe Gaumont (FRA)	Cofidis	s.t.
10	Rolf Sørensen (DEN)	Rabobank	s.t.

General classification after stage 21

Rank	Rider	Team	Time
1	Jan Ullrich (GER)	Team Telekom	100h 30' 35"
2	Richard Virenque (FRA)	Festina–Lotus	+ 9' 09"
3	Marco Pantani (ITA)	Mercatone Uno	+ 14' 03"
4	Abraham Olano (ESP)	Banesto	+ 15' 55"
5	Fernando Escartín (ESP)	Kelme–Costa Blanca	+ 20' 32"
6	Francesco Casagrande (ITA)	Saeco–Estro	+ 22' 47"
7	Bjarne Riis (DEN)	Team Telekom	+ 26' 34"
8	José María Jiménez (ESP)	Banesto	+ 31' 17"
9	Laurent Dufaux (SUI)	Festina–Lotus	+ 31' 55"
10	Roberto Conti (ITA)	Mercatone Uno	+ 32' 26"
