= 1998 Tour de France, Prologue to Stage 11 =

Stages of cycle race

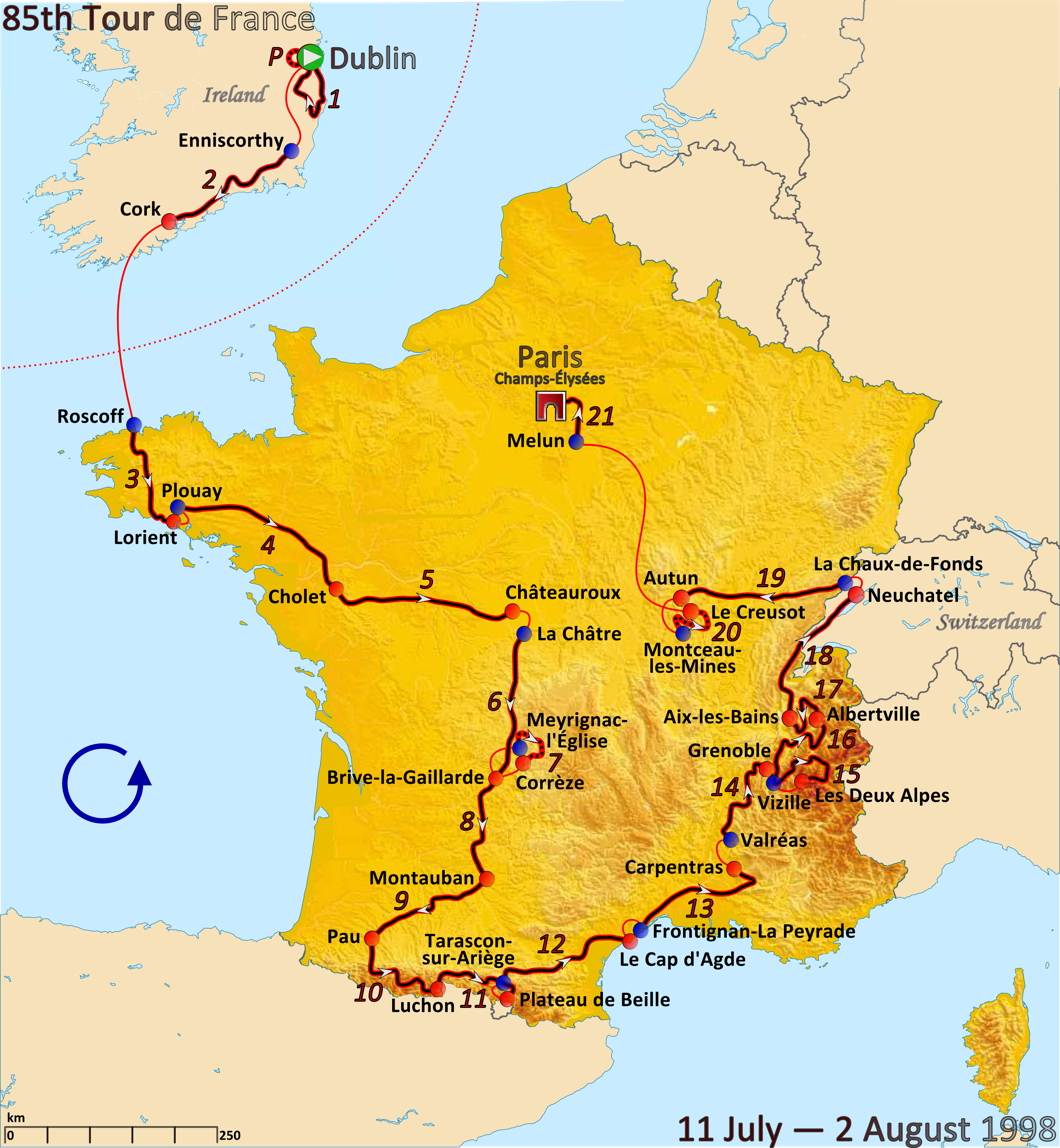
Route of the 1998 Tour de France

The 1998 Tour de France was the 85th edition of Tour de France, one of cycling's Grand Tours. The Tour began in Dublin, Ireland with a prologue individual time trial on 11 July and Stage 11 occurred on 22 July with a mountainous stage to Plateau de Beille. The race finished on the Champs-Élysées in Paris on 2 August.

== Prologue ==
11 July 1998 — Dublin, 5.6 km (3.5 mi) (ITT)

The 1998 race commenced in the Irish capital of Dublin. Prior to the prologue, the Tour was already in uproar, as Festina masseur Willy Voet was found at the Belgian border carrying in his car performance-enhancing drugs. The team nonetheless started the race, placing three riders in the top ten.
The prologue was won by favorite Chris Boardman, 4 seconds in front of Abraham Olano. Previous year's winner Jan Ullrich came in sixth, just 5 seconds behind Boardman.

Prologue result

Rank	Rider	Team	Time
1	Chris Boardman (GBR)	GAN	6' 12"
2	Abraham Olano (ESP)	Banesto	+ 4"
3	Laurent Jalabert (FRA)	ONCE	+ 5"
4	Bobby Julich (USA)	Cofidis	+ 5"
5	Christophe Moreau (FRA)	Festina	+ 5"
6	Jan Ullrich (GER)	Team Telekom	+ 5"
7	Alex Zülle (SWI)	Festina	+ 7"
8	Laurent Dufaux (SWI)	Festina	+ 9"
9	Andreï Tchmil (BEL)	Lotto	+ 10"
10	Vjatceslav Ekimov (RUS)	US Postal	+ 11"

General Classification after Prologue

Rank	Rider	Team	Time
1	Chris Boardman (GBR)	GAN	6' 12"
2	Abraham Olano (ESP)	Banesto	+ 4"
3	Laurent Jalabert (FRA)	ONCE	+ 5"
4	Bobby Julich (USA)	Cofidis	+ 5"
5	Christophe Moreau (FRA)	Festina	+ 5"
6	Jan Ullrich (GER)	Team Telekom	+ 5"
7	Alex Zülle (SWI)	Festina	+ 7"
8	Laurent Dufaux (SWI)	Festina	+ 9"
9	Andreï Tchmil (BEL)	Lotto	+ 10"
10	Vjatceslav Ekimov (RUS)	US Postal	+ 11"

== Stage 1 ==
12 July 1998 — Dublin to Dublin, 180.5 km (112.2 mi)

The windy and rainy first stage included the Cat. 3 climb of Wicklow Gap after 111 km. Tom Steels took his first ever stage win.

Stage 1 result

Rank	Rider	Team	Time
1	Tom Steels (BEL)	Mapei	4h 29' 58"
2	Erik Zabel (GER)	Team Telekom	s.t.
3	Robbie McEwen (AUS)	Rabobank	s.t.
4	Gian Matteo Fagnini (ITA)	Saeco	s.t.
5	Nicola Minali (ITA)	Riso Scotti–MG Maglificio	s.t.
6	Frédéric Moncassin (FRA)	GAN	s.t.
7	Philippe Gaumont (FRA)	Cofidis	s.t.
8	Mario Traversoni (ITA)	Mercatone Uno	s.t.
9	François Simon (FRA)	GAN	s.t.
10	Ján Svorada (CZE)	Mapei	s.t.

General classification after stage 1

Rank	Rider	Team	Time
1	Chris Boardman (GBR)	GAN	4h 36' 10"
2	Abraham Olano (ESP)	Banesto	+ 4"
3	Laurent Jalabert (FRA)	ONCE	+ 5"
4	Bobby Julich (USA)	Cofidis	+ 5"
5	Christophe Moreau (FRA)	Festina	+ 5"
6	Jan Ullrich (GER)	Team Telekom	+ 5"
7	Alex Zülle (SWI)	Festina	+ 7"
8	Erik Zabel (GER)	Team Telekom	+ 8"
9	Tom Steels (BEL)	Mapei	+ 9"
10	Laurent Dufaux (SWI)	Festina	+ 9"

== Stage 2 ==
13 July 1998 — Enniscorthy to Cork, 205.5 km (127.7 mi)

For stage 2, the Tour stayed in Ireland. Chris Boardman lost the jellow jersey after crashing some 50 km before the finish. He had to withdraw from the race. The race paid homage to Sean Kelly, passing his home village of Carrick-on-Suir. The stage was won in a mass sprint by Ján Svorada, with Erik Zabel taking yellow.

Stage 2 result

Rank	Rider	Team	Time
1	Ján Svorada (CZE)	Mapei	5h 45' 10"
2	Robbie McEwen (AUS)	Rabobank	s.t.
3	Mario Cipollini (ITA)	Saeco	s.t.
4	Alain Turicchia (ITA)	Asics	s.t.
5	Tom Steels (BEL)	Mapei	s.t.
6	Emmanuel Magnien (FRA)	FDJ	s.t.
7	Jaan Kirsipuu (EST)	Casino	s.t.
8	Nicola Minali (ITA)	Riso Scotti–MG Maglificio	s.t.
9	Jeroen Blijlevens (NED)	TVM	s.t.
10	Silvio Martinello (ITA)	Polti	s.t.

General classification after stage 2

Rank	Rider	Team	Time
1	Erik Zabel (GER)	Team Telekom	10h 21' 16"
2	Tom Steels (BEL)	Mapei	+ 7"
3	Frédéric Moncassin (FRA)	GAN	+ 7"
4	Abraham Olano (ESP)	Banesto	+ 8"
5	Laurent Jalabert (FRA)	ONCE	+ 9"
6	Bobby Julich (USA)	Cofidis	+ 9"
7	Christophe Moreau (FRA)	Festina	+ 9"
8	Jan Ullrich (GER)	Team Telekom	+ 9"
9	Ján Svorada (CZE)	Mapei	+ 10"
10	Robbie McEwen (AUS)	Rabobank	+ 11"

== Stage 3 ==
14 July 1998 — Roscoff to Lorient, 169 km (105.0 mi)

For Bastille Day, the Tour returned to its homeland. The race was dominated by a 9-man breakaway, including three Frenchmen. The hopes of the French fans were spoiled by Team Telekom's Jens Heppner, taking the stage in a sprint finish over Xavier Jan. Heppner's win saved Telekom's day, as Erik Zabel lost the maillot jaune to Bo Hamburger.

Stage 3 result

Rank	Rider	Team	Time
1	Jens Heppner (GER)	Team Telekom	3h 33' 36"
2	Xavier Jan (FRA)	FDJ	s.t.
3	George Hincapie (USA)	US Postal	+ 2"
4	Bo Hamburger (DEN)	Casino	s.t.
5	Stuart O'Grady (AUS)	GAN	s.t.
6	José Vicente García (ESP)	Banesto	s.t.
7	Pascal Hervé (FRA)	Festina	s.t.
8	Francisco Cabello (ESP)	Kelme	s.t.
9	Pascal Chanteur (FRA)	Casino	+ 5"
10	Fabrizio Guidi (ITA)	Polti	+ 1' 10"

General classification after stage 3

Rank	Rider	Team	Time
1	Bo Hamburger (DEN)	Casino	13h 55' 00"
2	George Hincapie (USA)	US Postal	+ 2"
3	Stuart O'Grady (AUS)	GAN	+ 3"
4	Jens Heppner (GER)	Team Telekom	+ 3"
5	Xavier Jan (FRA)	FDJ	+ 21"
6	Pascal Hervé (FRA)	Festina	+ 22"
7	José Vicente García (ESP)	Banesto	+ 23"
8	Pascal Chanteur (FRA)	Casino	+ 28"
9	Francisco Cabello (ESP)	Kelme	+ 47"
10	Erik Zabel (GER)	Team Telekom	+ 1' 02"

== Stage 4 ==
15 July 1998 — Plouay – Cholet, 252 km (156.6 mi)

The longest stage of the 1998 Tour led the riders over 252 km. Over the course there was a heavy "war for the bonuses" at the three intermediate sprints, with Stuart O'Grady coming out as the winner and taking the yellow jersey, the first Australian to do so for 16 years.

Stage 4 result

Rank	Rider	Team	Time
1	Jeroen Blijlevens (NED)	TVM	5h 48' 32"
2	Nicola Minali (ITA)	Riso Scotti–MG Maglificio	s.t.
3	Ján Svorada (CZE)	Mapei	s.t.
4	Frédéric Moncassin (FRA)	GAN	s.t.
5	Andrei Tchmil (BEL)	Lotto	s.t.
6	Erik Zabel (GER)	Team Telekom	s.t.
7	Tom Steels (BEL)	Mapei	s.t.
8	Lars Michaelsen (DEN)	TVM	s.t.
9	Maximilian Sciandri (GBR)	FDJ	s.t.
10	Fabio Baldato (ITA)	Riso Scotti–MG Maglificio	s.t.

General classification after stage 3

Rank	Rider	Team	Time
1	Stuart O'Grady (AUS)	GAN	19h 43' 29"
2	Bo Hamburger (DEN)	Casino	+ 11"
3	George Hincapie (USA)	US Postal	+ 11"
4	Jens Heppner (GER)	Team Telekom	+ 14"
5	Xavier Jan (FRA)	FDJ	+ 32"
6	Pascal Hervé (FRA)	Festina	+ 33"
7	José Vicente García (ESP)	Banesto	+ 34"
8	Pascal Chanteur (FRA)	Casino	+ 39"
9	Francisco Cabello (ESP)	Kelme	+ 58"
10	Erik Zabel (GER)	Team Telekom	+ 1' 01"

== Stage 5 ==
16 July 1998 — Cholet to Châteauroux, 228.5 km (142.0 mi)

Before stage 5, Festina's team manager Bruno Roussel was suspended and taken in for police questioning. The team nevertheless started the stage. The peloton rode through Brittany in heavy rain which prevented attacks from being successful.

Stage 5 result

Rank	Rider	Team	Time
1	Mario Cipollini (ITA)	Saeco	5h 18' 49"
2	Erik Zabel (GER)	Team Telekom	s.t.
3	Christophe Mengin (FRA)	FDJ	s.t.
4	Andrea Ferrigato (ITA)	Vitalicio Seguros	s.t.
5	Philippe Gaumont (FRA)	Cofidis	s.t.
6	Robbie McEwen (AUS)	Rabobank	s.t.
7	George Hincapie (USA)	US Postal	s.t.
8	Fabrizio Guidi (ITA)	Polti	s.t.
9	Frédéric Moncassin (FRA)	GAN	s.t.
10	Alessio Bongioni (ITA)	Asics	s.t.

General classification after stage 5

Rank	Rider	Team	Time
1	Stuart O'Grady (AUS)	GAN	25h 02' 18"
2	George Hincapie (USA)	US Postal	+ 7"
3	Bo Hamburger (DEN)	Casino	+ 11"
4	Jens Heppner (GER)	Team Telekom	+ 14"
5	Xavier Jan (FRA)	FDJ	+ 32"
6	Pascal Hervé (FRA)	Festina	+ 33"
7	José Vicente García (ESP)	Banesto	+ 34"
8	Pascal Chanteur (FRA)	Casino	+ 39"
9	Erik Zabel (GER)	Team Telekom	+ 45"
10	Francisco Cabello (ESP)	Kelme	+ 58"

== Stage 6 ==
17 July 1998 — La Châtre to Brive-la-Gaillarde, 204.5 km (127.1 mi)

Stage 6 was marked by many attacks, but none proved to be successful. In the end, Mario Cipollini took his second consecutive stage win.

Stage 6 result

Rank	Rider	Team	Time
1	Mario Cipollini (ITA)	Saeco	5h 05' 32"
2	Nicola Minali (ITA)	Riso Scotti–MG Maglificio	s.t.
3	Ján Svorada (CZE)	Mapei	s.t.
4	Frédéric Moncassin (FRA)	GAN	s.t.
5	Erik Zabel (GER)	Team Telekom	s.t.
6	Tom Steels (BEL)	Mapei	s.t.
7	Mario Traversoni (ITA)	Mercatone Uno	s.t.
8	Jeroen Blijlevens (NED)	TVM	s.t.
9	Emmanuel Magnien (FRA)	FDJ	s.t.
10	George Hincapie (USA)	US Postal	s.t.

General classification after stage 6

Rank	Rider	Team	Time
1	Stuart O'Grady (AUS)	GAN	30h 07' 48"
2	George Hincapie (USA)	US Postal	+ 9"
3	Bo Hamburger (DEN)	Casino	+ 13"
4	Jens Heppner (GER)	Team Telekom	+ 16"
5	Xavier Jan (FRA)	FDJ	+ 34"
6	Pascal Hervé (FRA)	Festina	+ 35"
7	José Vicente García (ESP)	Banesto	+ 36"
8	Pascal Chanteur (FRA)	Casino	+ 41"
9	Erik Zabel (GER)	Team Telekom	+ 43"
10	Ján Svorada (CZE)	Mapei	+ 47"

== Stage 7 ==
18 July 1998 — Meyrignac-l'Église to Corrèze, 58 km (36.0 mi) (Individual time trial)

On the morning before stage 7, the first long time trial, turmoil hit the Tour. After its manager had confessed to doping practices in Team Festina, the team was pulled from the race. Initially, the team refused to accept and declared its intention to race, but later left the Tour in disgrace. Tour favorite and French hero Richard Virenque was seen on TV stating his innocence, shaken by tears. On the road, Jan Ullrich lived up to his reputation as an excellent time trialist and took the stage, an impressive 70 seconds in front of Tyler Hamilton. He also took the yellow jersey.

Stage 7 result

Rank	Rider	Team	Time
1	Jan Ullrich (GER)	Team Telekom	1h 15' 25"
2	Tyler Hamilton (USA)	US Postal	+ 1' 10"
3	Bobby Julich (USA)	Cofidis	+ 1' 18"
4	Laurent Jalabert (FRA)	ONCE	+ 1' 24"
5	Viacheslav Ekimov (RUS)	US Postal	+ 1' 40"
6	Abraham Olano (ESP)	Banesto	+ 2' 13"
7	Evgeni Berzin (RUS)	FDJ	+ 2' 21"
8	Francesco Casagrande (ITA)	Cofidis	+ 2' 22"
9	Stéphane Heulot (FRA)	FDJ	+ 2' 22"
10	Bo Hamburger (DEN)	Casino	+ 2' 29"

General classification after stage 7

Rank	Rider	Team	Time
1	Jan Ullrich (GER)	Team Telekom	31h 24' 37"
2	Bo Hamburger (DEN)	Casino	+ 1' 18"
3	Bobby Julich (USA)	Cofidis	+ 1' 18"
4	Laurent Jalabert (FRA)	ONCE	+ 1' 24"
5	Tyler Hamilton (USA)	US Postal	+ 1' 30"
6	Viacheslav Ekimov (RUS)	US Postal	+ 1' 46"
7	José Vicente García (ESP)	Banesto	+ 1' 50"
8	Stuart O'Grady (AUS)	GAN	+ 1' 53"
9	Abraham Olano (ESP)	Banesto	+ 2' 12"
10	Jens Heppner (GER)	Team Telekom	+ 2' 17"

== Stage 8 ==
19 July 1998 — Brive-la-Gaillarde to Montauban, 190.5 km (118.4 mi)

Six climbs of lower categories were on this stage's profile, making it perfect for strong breakaway groups. The stage was won by breakaway king Jacky Durand, getting the best from a 6-rider sprint finish.

Stage 8 result

Rank	Rider	Team	Time
1	Jacky Durand (FRA)	Casino	4h 40' 55"
2	Andrea Tafi (ITA)	Mapei	s.t.
3	Fabio Sacchi (ITA)	Polti	s.t.
4	Eddy Mazzoleni (ITA)	Saeco	s.t.
5	Laurent Desbiens (FRA)	Cofidis	s.t.
6	Joona Laukka (FIN)	Lotto	s.t.
7	Philippe Gaumont (FRA)	Cofidis	+ 1' 34"
8	Erik Zabel (GER)	Team Telekom	+ 7' 45"
9	Serguei Ivanov (RUS)	TVM	s.t.
10	Ján Svorada (CZE)	Mapei	s.t.

General classification after stage 8

Rank	Rider	Team	Time
1	Laurent Desbiens (FRA)	Cofidis	36h 09' 56"
2	Andrea Tafi (ITA)	Mapei	+ 14"
3	Jacky Durand (FRA)	Casino	+ 43"
4	Joona Laukka (FIN)	Lotto	+ 2' 54"
5	Jan Ullrich (GER)	Team Telekom	+ 3' 21"
6	Bo Hamburger (DEN)	Casino	+ 4' 39"
7	Bobby Julich (USA)	Cofidis	+ 4' 39"
8	Laurent Jalabert (FRA)	ONCE	+ 4' 45"
9	Tyler Hamilton (USA)	US Postal	+ 4' 51"
10	Viacheslav Ekimov (RUS)	US Postal	+ 5' 07"

== Stage 9 ==
20 July 1998 — Montauban to Pau, 210 km (130.5 mi)

Léon van Bon won his second Tour stage, beating Jens Voigt in a sprint finish, with the peloton rapidly approaching.

Stage 9 result

Rank	Rider	Team	Time
1	Léon van Bon (NED)	Rabobank	5h 21' 10"
2	Jens Voigt (GER)	GAN	s.t.
3	Massimiliano Lelli (ITA)	Cofidis	s.t.
4	Christophe Agnolutto (FRA)	Casino	s.t.
5	Erik Zabel (GER)	Team Telekom	+ 12"
6	Robbie McEwen (AUS)	Rabobank	s.t.
7	Tom Steels (BEL)	Mapei	s.t.
8	Mario Traversoni (ITA)	Mercatone Uno	s.t.
9	François Simon (FRA)	GAN	s.t.
10	Lars Michaelsen (DEN)	TVM	s.t.

General classification after stage 9

Rank	Rider	Team	Time
1	Laurent Desbiens (FRA)	Cofidis	41h 31' 18"
2	Andrea Tafi (ITA)	Mapei	+ 14"
3	Jacky Durand (FRA)	Casino	+ 43"
4	Joona Laukka (FIN)	Lotto	+ 2' 54"
5	Jan Ullrich (GER)	Team Telekom	+ 3' 21"
6	Bo Hamburger (DEN)	Casino	+ 4' 39"
7	Bobby Julich (USA)	Cofidis	+ 4' 39"
8	Laurent Jalabert (FRA)	ONCE	+ 4' 45"
9	Viacheslav Ekimov (RUS)	US Postal	+ 5' 07"
10	José Vicente García (ESP)	Banesto	+ 5' 11"

== Stage 10 ==
21 July 1998 — Pau to Luchon, 196.5 km (122.1 mi)

The Tour entered the mountains on stage 10. On the program were the two hors catégorie climbs of Col d'Aubisque and Col du Tourmalet and the 1st category climbs of Col d'Aspin and Col de Peyresourde. Jan Ullrich reclaimed the yellow jersey, but lost 23 seconds to Marco Pantani, who went after eventual stage winner Rodolfo Massi on the last climb and came in second.

Stage 10 result

Rank	Rider	Team	Time
1	Rodolfo Massi (ITA)	Casino	5h 49' 40"
2	Marco Pantani (ITA)	Mercatone Uno	+ 36"
3	Michael Boogerd (NED)	Rabobank	+ 59"
4	Bobby Julich (USA)	Cofidis	s.t.
5	Giuseppe Di Grande (ITA)	Mapei	s.t.
6	José María Jiménez (ESP)	Banesto	s.t.
7	Fernando Escartín (ESP)	Kelme	s.t.
8	Jan Ullrich (GER)	Team Telekom	s.t.
9	Jean-Cyril Robin (FRA)	US Postal	s.t.
10	Leonardo Piepoli (ITA)	Saeco	s.t.

General classification after stage 10

Rank	Rider	Team	Time
1	Jan Ullrich (GER)	Team Telekom	47h 25' 18"
2	Bobby Julich (USA)	Cofidis	+ 1' 18"
3	Bo Hamburger (DEN)	Casino	+ 2' 17"
4	Laurent Jalabert (FRA)	ONCE	+ 2' 38"
5	Luc Leblanc (FRA)	Polti	+ 3' 03"
6	Abraham Olano (ESP)	Banesto	+ 3' 11"
7	Michael Boogerd (NED)	Rabobank	+ 3' 36"
8	Evgeni Berzin (RUS)	FDJ	+ 3' 39"
9	Stéphane Heulot (FRA)	FDJ	+ 3' 40"
10	Bjarne Riis (DEN)	Team Telekom	+ 3' 51"

== Stage 11 ==
22 July 1998 — Luchon to Plateau de Beille, 170 km (105.6 mi)

This stage was extremely mountainous, with the finish on the summit of Plateau de Beille. In sunny weather, Marco Pantani attacked late on the last climb, taking the stage and 1' 39" from Jan Ullrich. Team Cofidis put in an impressive performance, with four riders reaching the top ten of the stage.

Stage 11 result

Rank	Rider	Team	Time
1	Marco Pantani (ITA)	Mercatone Uno	5h 15' 27"
2	Roland Meier (SWI)	Cofidis	+ 1' 26"
3	Bobby Julich (USA)	Cofidis	+ 1' 33"
4	Michael Boogerd (NED)	Rabobank	s.t.
5	Leonardo Piepoli (ITA)	Saeco	s.t.
6	Fernando Escartín (ESP)	Kelme	s.t.
7	Christophe Rinero (FRA)	Cofidis	s.t.
8	Jan Ullrich (GER)	Team Telekom	+ 1' 40"
9	Kevin Livingston (USA)	Cofidis	+ 2' 01"
10	Ángel Casero (ESP)	Vitalicio Seguros	+ 2' 03"

General classification after stage 11

Rank	Rider	Team	Time
1	Jan Ullrich (GER)	Team Telekom	52h 42' 25"
2	Bobby Julich (USA)	Cofidis	+ 1' 11"
3	Laurent Jalabert (FRA)	ONCE	+ 3' 01"
4	Marco Pantani (ITA)	Mercatone Uno	+ 3' 01"
5	Michael Boogerd (NED)	Rabobank	+ 3' 29"
6	Luc Leblanc (FRA)	Polti	+ 4' 16"
7	Bo Hamburger (DEN)	Casino	+ 4' 44"
8	Fernando Escartín (ESP)	Kelme	+ 5' 16"
9	Roland Meier (SWI)	Cofidis	+ 5' 28"
10	Ángel Casero (ESP)	Vitalicio Seguros	+ 5' 53"
