= 1997 Tour de France, Prologue to Stage 10 =

Cycling race stages

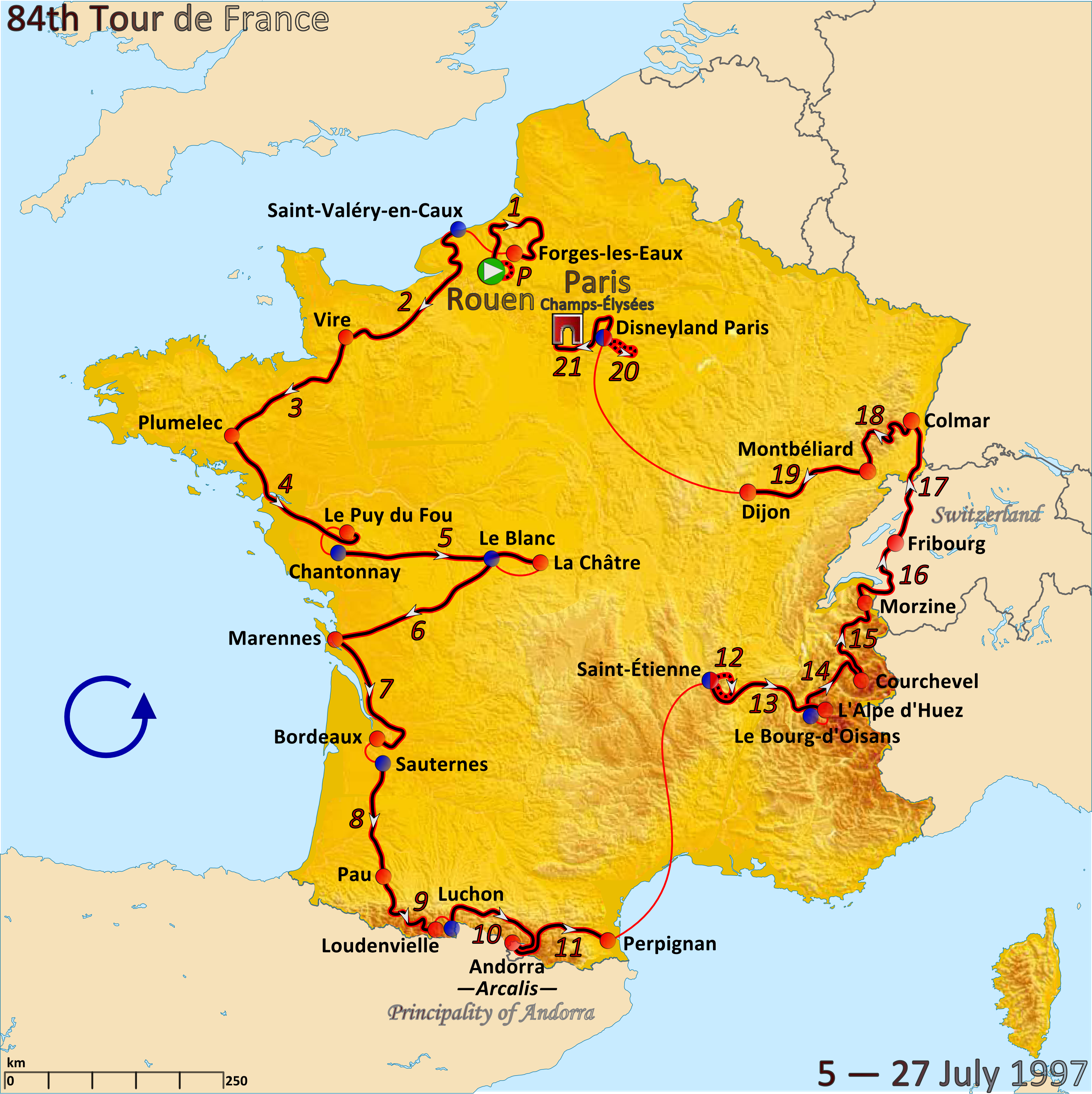
Route of the 1997 Tour de France

The 1997 Tour de France was the 84th edition of Tour de France, one of cycling's Grand Tours. The Tour began in Rouen with a prologue individual time trial on 5 July and Stage 10 occurred on 15 July with a mountainous stage to Andorra Arcalis. The race finished on the Champs-Élysées in Paris on 27 July.

== Prologue ==
5 July 1997 — Rouen, 7.3 km (4.5 mi) (ITT)

Prologue result and general classification after prologue

Rank	Rider	Team	Time
1	Chris Boardman (GBR)	GAN	8' 20"
2	Jan Ullrich (GER)	Team Telekom	+ 2"
3	Evgeni Berzin (RUS)	Batik–Del Monte	+ 5"
4	Tony Rominger (SUI)	Cofidis	s.t.
5	Alex Zülle (SUI)	ONCE	s.t.
6	Peter Meinert Nielsen (DEN)	U.S. Postal Service	+ 7"
7	Rolf Sørensen (DEN)	Rabobank	+ 10"
8	Abraham Olano (ESP)	Banesto	s.t.
9	Laurent Brochard (FRA)	Festina–Lotus	+ 11"
10	Christophe Moreau (FRA)	Festina–Lotus	+ 12"

== Stage 1 ==
6 July 1997 — Rouen to Forges-les-Eaux, 192 km (119.3 mi)

Stage 1 result

Rank	Rider	Team	Time
1	Mario Cipollini (ITA)	Saeco–Estro	4h 39' 59"
2	Tom Steels (BEL)	Mapei–GB	s.t.
3	Frédéric Moncassin (FRA)	GAN	s.t.
4	Erik Zabel (GER)	Team Telekom	s.t.
5	Robbie McEwen (AUS)	Rabobank	s.t.
6	Nicolas Jalabert (FRA)	Cofidis	s.t.
7	Gordon Fraser (CAN)	La Mutuelle de Seine et Marne	s.t.
8	Nicola Minali (ITA)	Batik–Del Monte	s.t.
9	François Simon (FRA)	GAN	s.t.
10	Mario Traversoni (ITA)	Mercatone Uno	s.t.

General classification after stage 1

Rank	Rider	Team	Time
1	Mario Cipollini (ITA)	Saeco–Estro	4h 48' 09"
2	Chris Boardman (GBR)	GAN	+ 10"
3	Jan Ullrich (GER)	Team Telekom	+ 12"
4	Tony Rominger (SUI)	Cofidis	+ 15"
5	Abraham Olano (ESP)	Banesto	+ 20"
6	Tom Steels (BEL)	Mapei–GB	+ 24"
7	Servais Knaven (NED)	TVM–Farm Frites	+ 25"
8	Erik Dekker (NED)	Rabobank	+ 27"
9	Oscar Camenzind (SUI)	Mapei–GB	s.t.
10	Frank Vandenbroucke (BEL)	Mapei–GB	+ 28"

== Stage 2 ==
7 July 1997 — Saint-Valery-en-Caux to Vire, 262 km (162.8 mi)

Stage 2 result

Rank	Rider	Team	Time
1	Mario Cipollini (ITA)	Saeco–Estro	6h 27' 47"
2	Erik Zabel (GER)	Team Telekom	s.t.
3	Jeroen Blijlevens (NED)	TVM–Farm Frites	s.t.
4	Frédéric Moncassin (FRA)	GAN	s.t.
5	Serguei Outschakov (UKR)	Team Polti	s.t.
6	Adriano Baffi (ITA)	U.S. Postal Service	s.t.
7	Claude Lamour (FRA)	La Mutuelle de Seine et Marne	s.t.
8	Henk Vogels (AUS)	GAN	s.t.
9	Robbie McEwen (AUS)	Rabobank	s.t.
10	Massimo Strazzer (ITA)	Roslotto–ZG Mobili	s.t.

General classification after stage 2

Rank	Rider	Team	Time
1	Mario Cipollini (ITA)	Saeco–Estro	11h 15' 30"
2	Chris Boardman (GBR)	GAN	+ 36"
3	Jan Ullrich (GER)	Team Telekom	+ 38"
4	Tony Rominger (SUI)	Cofidis	+ 41"
5	Abraham Olano (ESP)	Banesto	+ 46"
6	Laurent Jalabert (FRA)	ONCE	+ 48"
7	Jeroen Blijlevens (NED)	TVM–Farm Frites	s.t.
8	Erik Zabel (GER)	Team Telekom	+ 49"
9	Tom Steels (BEL)	Mapei–GB	+ 50"
10	Servais Knaven (NED)	TVM–Farm Frites	+ 51"

== Stage 3 ==
8 July 1997 — Vire to Plumelec, 224 km (139 mi)

Stage 3 result

Rank	Rider	Team	Time
1	Erik Zabel (GER)	Team Telekom	4h 54' 33"
2	Frank Vandenbroucke (BEL)	Mapei–GB	s.t.
3	Bjarne Riis (DEN)	Team Telekom	s.t.
4	Laurent Jalabert (FRA)	ONCE	s.t.
5	Davide Rebellin (ITA)	Française des Jeux	s.t.
6	Abraham Olano (ESP)	Banesto	s.t.
7	Jean-Cyril Robin (FRA)	U.S. Postal Service	s.t.
8	Jan Ullrich (GER)	Team Telekom	s.t.
9	Laurent Dufaux (SUI)	Festina–Lotus	s.t.
10	Pascal Chanteur (FRA)	Casino	s.t.

General classification after stage 3

Rank	Rider	Team	Time
1	Mario Cipollini (ITA)	Saeco–Estro	16h 10' 12"
2	Erik Zabel (GER)	Team Telekom	+ 14"
3	Chris Boardman (GBR)	GAN	+ 27"
4	Jan Ullrich (GER)	Team Telekom	+ 29"
5	Frank Vandenbroucke (BEL)	Mapei–GB	+ 33"
6	Abraham Olano (ESP)	Banesto	+ 37"
7	Laurent Jalabert (FRA)	ONCE	+ 39"
8	Pascal Lino (FRA)	BigMat–Auber 93	+ 52"
9	Frédéric Moncassin (FRA)	GAN	+ 55"
10	Oscar Camenzind (SUI)	Mapei–GB	s.t.

== Stage 4 ==
9 July 1997 — Plumelec to Le Puy du Fou, 223 km (139 mi)

Stage 4 result

Rank	Rider	Team	Time
1	Nicola Minali (ITA)	Batik–Del Monte	5h 46' 42"
2	Frédéric Moncassin (FRA)	GAN	s.t.
3	Erik Zabel (GER)	Team Telekom	s.t.
4	Mario Cipollini (ITA)	Saeco–Estro	s.t.
5	Jeroen Blijlevens (NED)	TVM–Farm Frites	s.t.
6	Fabio Baldato (ITA)	MG Maglificio–Technogym	s.t.
7	Jaan Kirsipuu (EST)	Casino	s.t.
8	Stuart O'Grady (AUS)	GAN	s.t.
9	Robbie McEwen (AUS)	Rabobank	s.t.
10	Nicola Loda (ITA)	MG Maglificio–Technogym	s.t.

General classification after stage 4

Rank	Rider	Team	Time
1	Mario Cipollini (ITA)	Saeco–Estro	21h 56' 46"
2	Erik Zabel (GER)	Team Telekom	+ 4"
3	Chris Boardman (GBR)	GAN	+ 35"
4	Jan Ullrich (GER)	Team Telekom	+ 37"
5	Frank Vandenbroucke (BEL)	Mapei–GB	+ 41"
6	Abraham Olano (ESP)	Banesto	+ 45"
7	Laurent Jalabert (FRA)	ONCE	+ 47"
8	Frédéric Moncassin (FRA)	GAN	+ 51"
9	Pascal Lino (FRA)	BigMat–Auber 93	+ 1' 00"
10	Oscar Camenzind (SUI)	Mapei–GB	+ 1' 03"

== Stage 5 ==
10 July 1997 — Chantonnay to La Châtre, 261.5 km (162.5 mi)

Stage 5 result

Rank	Rider	Team	Time
1	Cédric Vasseur (FRA)	GAN	6h 16' 14"
2	Stuart O'Grady (AUS)	GAN	+ 2' 32"
3	Francisco Cabello (ESP)	Kelme–Costa Blanca	s.t.
4	Marco Artunghi (ITA)	Mercatone Uno	s.t.
5	Peter Meinert Nielsen (DEN)	U.S. Postal Service	s.t.
6	Thierry Bourguignon (FRA)	BigMat–Auber 93	s.t.
7	Fabrice Gougot (FRA)	Casino	s.t.
8	Stéphane Cueff (FRA)	La Mutuelle de Seine et Marne	s.t.
9	Marco Zen (ITA)	Roslotto–ZG Mobili	s.t.
10	Bo Hamburger (DEN)	TVM–Farm Frites	s.t.

General classification after stage 5

Rank	Rider	Team	Time
1	Cédric Vasseur (FRA)	GAN	28h 14' 35"
2	Mario Cipollini (ITA)	Saeco–Estro	+ 2' 17"
3	Erik Zabel (GER)	Team Telekom	+ 2' 19"
4	Chris Boardman (GBR)	GAN	+ 2' 54"
5	Jan Ullrich (GER)	Team Telekom	+ 2' 56"
6	Frank Vandenbroucke (BEL)	Mapei–GB	+ 3' 00"
7	Abraham Olano (ESP)	Banesto	+ 3' 04"
8	Stuart O'Grady (AUS)	GAN	+ 3' 05"
9	Frédéric Moncassin (FRA)	GAN	+ 3' 06"
10	Laurent Jalabert (FRA)	ONCE	s.t.

== Stage 6 ==
11 July 1997 — Le Blanc to Marennes, 217.5 km (135.1 mi)

Stage 6 result

Rank	Rider	Team	Time
1	Jeroen Blijlevens (NED)	TVM–Farm Frites	5h 58' 09"
2	Djamolidine Abdoujaparov (UZB)	Lotto–Mobistar–Isoglass	s.t.
3	Mario Traversoni (ITA)	Mercatone Uno	s.t.
4	Nicola Minali (ITA)	Batik–Del Monte	s.t.
5	Frédéric Moncassin (FRA)	GAN	s.t.
6	Robbie McEwen (AUS)	Rabobank	s.t.
7	Fabio Baldato (ITA)	MG Maglificio–Technogym	s.t.
8	Damien Nazon (FRA)	Française des Jeux	s.t.
9	Massimo Strazzer (ITA)	Roslotto–ZG Mobili	s.t.
10	François Simon (FRA)	GAN	s.t.

General classification after stage 6

Rank	Rider	Team	Time
1	Cédric Vasseur (FRA)	GAN	34h 12' 44"
2	Erik Zabel (GER)	Team Telekom	+ 2' 09"
3	Mario Cipollini (ITA)	Saeco–Estro	+ 2' 15"
4	Chris Boardman (GBR)	GAN	+ 2' 54"
5	Jan Ullrich (GER)	Team Telekom	+ 2' 56"
6	Frank Vandenbroucke (BEL)	Mapei–GB	+ 3' 00"
7	Stuart O'Grady (AUS)	GAN	+ 3' 03"
8	Frédéric Moncassin (FRA)	GAN	+ 3' 04"
9	Abraham Olano (ESP)	Banesto	s.t.
10	Laurent Jalabert (FRA)	ONCE	+ 3' 06"

== Stage 7 ==
12 July 1997 — Marennes to Bordeaux, 194 km (121 mi)

Stage 7 result

Rank	Rider	Team	Time
1	Erik Zabel (GER)	Team Telekom	4h 11' 15"
2	Jaan Kirsipuu (EST)	Casino	s.t.
3	Jeroen Blijlevens (NED)	TVM–Farm Frites	s.t.
4	Robbie McEwen (AUS)	Rabobank	s.t.
5	Massimo Strazzer (ITA)	Roslotto–ZG Mobili	s.t.
6	François Simon (FRA)	GAN	s.t.
7	Henk Vogels (AUS)	GAN	s.t.
8	Frédéric Moncassin (FRA)	GAN	s.t.
9	Nicolas Jalabert (FRA)	Cofidis	s.t.
10	Mario Traversoni (ITA)	Mercatone Uno	s.t.

General classification after stage 7

Rank	Rider	Team	Time
1	Cédric Vasseur (FRA)	GAN	38h 23' 59"
2	Erik Zabel (GER)	Team Telekom	+ 1' 49"
3	Chris Boardman (GBR)	GAN	+ 2' 54"
4	Jan Ullrich (GER)	Team Telekom	+ 2' 56"
5	Stuart O'Grady (AUS)	GAN	+ 3' 03"
6	Frédéric Moncassin (FRA)	GAN	+ 3' 04"
7	Abraham Olano (ESP)	Banesto	s.t.
8	Laurent Jalabert (FRA)	ONCE	+ 3' 06"
9	Oscar Camenzind (SUI)	Mapei–GB	+ 3' 22"
10	Davide Rebellin (ITA)	Française des Jeux	+ 3' 24"

== Stage 8 ==
13 July 1997 — Sauternes to Pau, 161.5 km (100.4 mi)

Stage 8 result

Rank	Rider	Team	Time
1	Erik Zabel (GER)	Team Telekom	3h 22' 42"
2	Nicola Minali (ITA)	Batik–Del Monte	s.t.
3	Jeroen Blijlevens (NED)	TVM–Farm Frites	s.t.
4	Frédéric Moncassin (FRA)	GAN	s.t.
5	Lauri Aus (EST)	Casino	s.t.
6	Gian Matteo Fagnini (ITA)	Saeco–Estro	s.t.
7	Andrei Tchmil (UKR)	Lotto–Mobistar–Isoglass	s.t.
8	Massimo Strazzer (ITA)	Roslotto–ZG Mobili	s.t.
9	Nicolas Jalabert (FRA)	Cofidis	s.t.
10	Adriano Baffi (ITA)	U.S. Postal Service	s.t.

General classification after stage 8

Rank	Rider	Team	Time
1	Cédric Vasseur (FRA)	GAN	41h 46' 41"
2	Erik Zabel (GER)	Team Telekom	+ 1' 21"
3	Chris Boardman (GBR)	GAN	+ 2' 54"
4	Jan Ullrich (GER)	Team Telekom	+ 2' 56"
5	Stuart O'Grady (AUS)	GAN	+ 2' 59"
6	Frédéric Moncassin (FRA)	GAN	+ 3' 04"
7	Abraham Olano (ESP)	Banesto	s.t.
8	Laurent Jalabert (FRA)	ONCE	+ 3' 06"
9	Oscar Camenzind (SUI)	Mapei–GB	+ 3' 22"
10	Davide Rebellin (ITA)	Française des Jeux	+ 3' 24"

== Stage 9 ==
14 July 1997 — Pau to Loudenvielle, 182 km (113 mi)

Stage 9 result

Rank	Rider	Team	Time
1	Laurent Brochard (FRA)	Festina–Lotus	5h 24' 57"
2	Richard Virenque (FRA)	Festina–Lotus	+ 14"
3	Marco Pantani (ITA)	Mercatone Uno	s.t.
4	Jan Ullrich (GER)	Team Telekom	s.t.
5	José María Jiménez (ESP)	Banesto	+ 33"
6	Laurent Dufaux (SUI)	Festina–Lotus	+ 41"
7	Fernando Escartín (ESP)	Kelme–Costa Blanca	s.t.
8	Bjarne Riis (DEN)	Team Telekom	s.t.
9	Francesco Casagrande (ITA)	Saeco–Estro	+ 1' 07"
10	Abraham Olano (ESP)	Banesto	s.t.

General classification after stage 9

Rank	Rider	Team	Time
1	Cédric Vasseur (FRA)	GAN	47h 14' 35"
2	Jan Ullrich (GER)	Team Telekom	+ 13"
3	Abraham Olano (ESP)	Banesto	+ 1' 14"
4	Bjarne Riis (DEN)	Team Telekom	+ 1' 43"
5	Richard Virenque (FRA)	Festina–Lotus	s.t.
6	Fernando Escartín (ESP)	Kelme–Costa Blanca	+ 2' 14"
7	Oscar Camenzind (SUI)	Mapei–GB	+ 2' 27"
8	Laurent Dufaux (SUI)	Festina–Lotus	+ 2' 48"
9	Daniele Nardello (ITA)	Mapei–GB	+ 3' 49"
10	Laurent Brochard (FRA)	Festina–Lotus	+ 4' 04"

== Stage 10 ==
15 July 1997 — Luchon to Andorra Arcalis, 252.5 km (156.9 mi)

Stage 10 result

Rank	Rider	Team	Time
1	Jan Ullrich (GER)	Team Telekom	7h 46' 06"
2	Marco Pantani (ITA)	Mercatone Uno	+ 1' 08"
3	Richard Virenque (FRA)	Festina–Lotus	s.t.
4	Francesco Casagrande (ITA)	Saeco–Estro	+ 2' 01"
5	Bjarne Riis (DEN)	Team Telekom	+ 3' 23"
6	Laurent Dufaux (SUI)	Festina–Lotus	+ 3' 27"
7	José María Jiménez (ESP)	Banesto	+ 3' 45"
8	Fernando Escartín (ESP)	Kelme–Costa Blanca	s.t.
9	Abraham Olano (ESP)	Banesto	s.t.
10	Alberto Elli (ITA)	Casino	s.t.

General classification after stage 10

Rank	Rider	Team	Time
1	Jan Ullrich (GER)	Team Telekom	55h 00' 54"
2	Richard Virenque (FRA)	Festina–Lotus	+ 2' 38"
3	Abraham Olano (ESP)	Banesto	+ 4' 46"
4	Bjarne Riis (DEN)	Team Telekom	+ 4' 53"
5	Marco Pantani (ITA)	Mercatone Uno	+ 5' 29"
6	Fernando Escartín (ESP)	Kelme–Costa Blanca	+ 5' 46"
7	Laurent Dufaux (SUI)	Festina–Lotus	+ 6' 02"
8	Oscar Camenzind (SUI)	Mapei–GB	+ 7' 00"
9	Francesco Casagrande (ITA)	Saeco–Estro	+ 7' 20"
10	Cédric Vasseur (FRA)	GAN	+ 7' 31"
