= 1997 Tour de France =

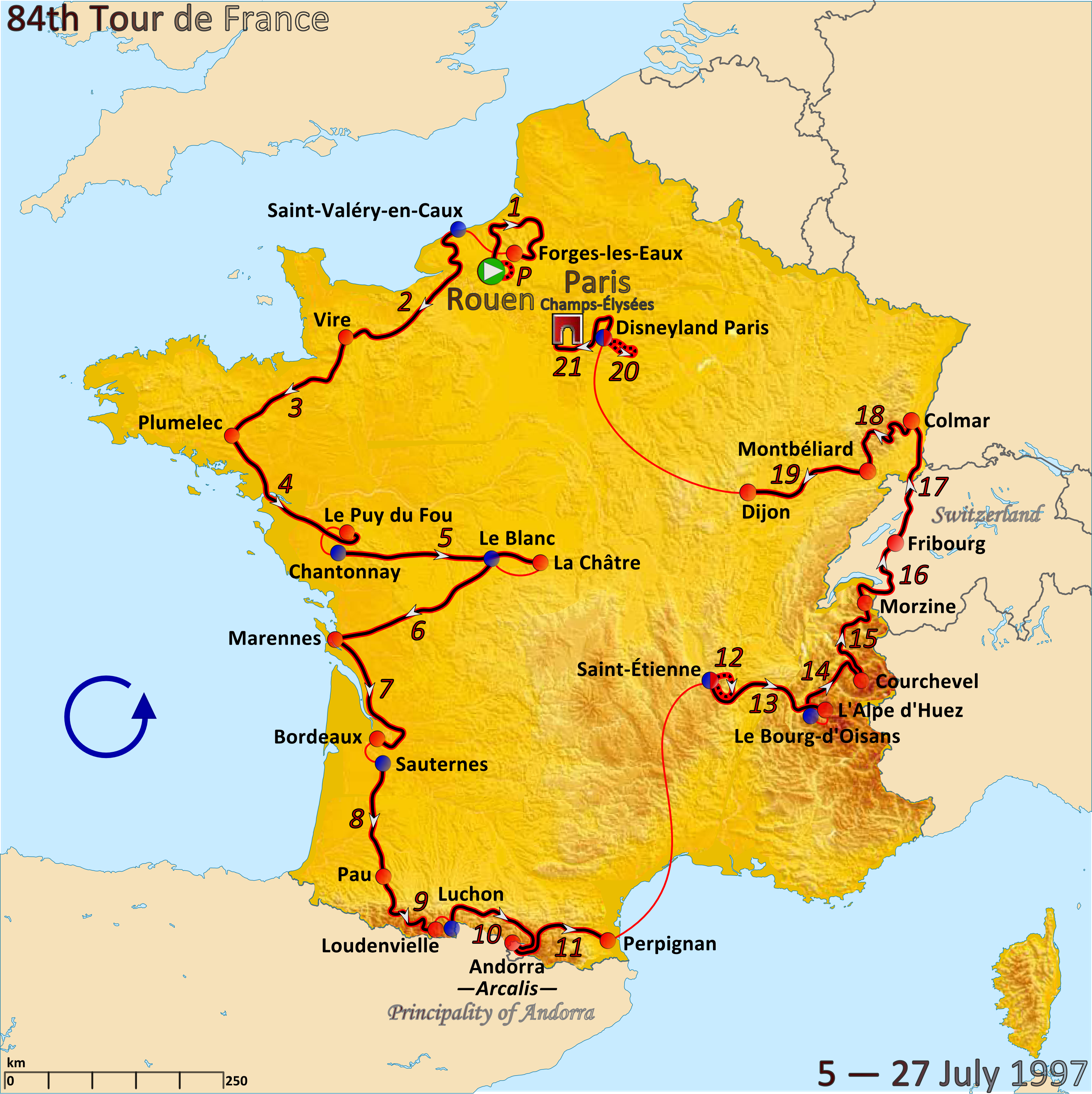
- Route of the 1997 Tour de France

Race details
- Dates: 5–27 July 1997
- Stages: 21 + Prologue
- Distance: 3,950 km (2,454 mi)
- Winning time: 100h 30' 35"

Results
| Jersey awarded to the overall winner | Winner | Jan Ullrich (GER) | (Team Telekom) |
| | Second | Richard Virenque (FRA) | (Festina–Lotus) |
| | Third | Marco Pantani (ITA) | (Mercatone Uno) |
| Jersey awarded to the points classification winner | Points | Erik Zabel (GER) | (Team Telekom) |
| Jersey awarded to the mountains classification winner | Mountains | Richard Virenque (FRA) | (Festina–Lotus) |
| | Youth | Jan Ullrich (GER) | (Team Telekom) |
| | Combativity | Richard Virenque (FRA) | (Festina–Lotus) |
| | Team | Team Telekom | |

The 1997 Tour de France was the 84th edition of the Tour de France and took place from 5 to 27 July. Jan Ullrich's victory margin of 9:09 was the largest margin of victory since Laurent Fignon won the 1984 Tour de France by 10:32. Since 1997 no rider has had this convincing of a win with the closest margin to Ullrich's victory being Vincenzo Nibali winning the 2014 Tour de France with a gap of 7:39. Ullrich's simultaneous victories in both the general classification and the young riders' classification marked the first time the same rider had won both categories in the same Tour since Laurent Fignon in 1983. The points classification was won by Ullrich's teammate Erik Zabel, for the second time, and their team Team Telekom also won the team classification. The mountains classification was won by Richard Virenque for the fourth time.

== Teams ==
198 riders in 22 teams commenced the 1997 Tour de France. 139 riders finished. The 16 teams with the highest UCI ranking at the start of 1997 were automatically qualified. Six wildcard invitations were also given.

The teams entering the race were:

Qualified teams

- Banesto
- Batik–Del Monte
- Casino
- Cofidis
- Festina–Lotus
- Française des Jeux
- GAN
- Mapei–GB
- MG Maglificio–Technogym
- ONCE
- Team Polti
- Rabobank
- Roslotto–ZG Mobili
- Saeco–Estro
- Team Telekom
- TVM–Farm Frites

Invited teams

- BigMat–Auber 93
- Kelme–Costa Blanca
- Lotto–Mobistar–Isoglass
- Mercatone Uno
- Mutuelle de Seine-et-Marne
- U.S. Postal Service

== Route and stages ==
The highest point of elevation in the race was 2,408 m (7,900 ft) at the summit of the Port d'Envalira mountain pass on stages 10 and 11.

Stage characteristics and winners
| Stage | Date | Course | Distance | Type | Winner |
|---|---|---|---|---|---|
| P | 5 July | Rouen | 7.3 km (4.5 mi) | Individual time trial | Chris Boardman (GBR) |
| 1 | 6 July | Rouen to Forges-les-Eaux | 192.0 km (119.3 mi) | Flat stage | Mario Cipollini (ITA) |
| 2 | 7 July | Saint-Valery-en-Caux to Vire | 262.0 km (162.8 mi) | Flat stage | Mario Cipollini (ITA) |
| 3 | 8 July | Vire to Plumelec | 224.0 km (139.2 mi) | Flat stage | Erik Zabel (GER) |
| 4 | 9 July | Plumelec to Le Puy du Fou | 223.0 km (138.6 mi) | Flat stage | Nicola Minali (ITA) |
| 5 | 10 July | Chantonnay to La Châtre | 261.5 km (162.5 mi) | Flat stage | Cédric Vasseur (FRA) |
| 6 | 11 July | Le Blanc to Marennes | 217.5 km (135.1 mi) | Flat stage | Jeroen Blijlevens (NED) |
| 7 | 12 July | Marennes to Bordeaux | 194.0 km (120.5 mi) | Flat stage | Erik Zabel (GER) |
| 8 | 13 July | Sauternes to Pau | 161.5 km (100.4 mi) | Flat stage | Erik Zabel (GER) |
| 9 | 14 July | Pau to Loudenvielle | 182.0 km (113.1 mi) | Mountain stage | Laurent Brochard (FRA) |
| 10 | 15 July | Luchon to Andorra Arcalis | 252.5 km (156.9 mi) | Mountain stage | Jan Ullrich (GER) |
| 11 | 16 July | Andorra Arcalis to Perpignan | 192.0 km (119.3 mi) | Hilly stage | Laurent Desbiens (FRA) |
| | 17 July | Saint-Étienne | | Rest day | |
| 12 | 18 July | Saint-Étienne | 55.0 km (34.2 mi) | Individual time trial | Jan Ullrich (GER) |
| 13 | 19 July | Saint-Étienne to Alpe d'Huez | 203.5 km (126.4 mi) | Mountain stage | Marco Pantani (ITA) |
| 14 | 20 July | Le Bourg-d'Oisans to Courchevel | 148.0 km (92.0 mi) | Mountain stage | Richard Virenque (FRA) |
| 15 | 21 July | Courchevel to Morzine | 208.5 km (129.6 mi) | Mountain stage | Marco Pantani (ITA) |
| 16 | 22 July | Morzine to Fribourg (Switzerland) | 181.0 km (112.5 mi) | Hilly stage | Christophe Mengin (FRA) |
| 17 | 23 July | Fribourg (Switzerland) to Colmar | 218.5 km (135.8 mi) | Flat stage | Neil Stephens (AUS) |
| 18 | 24 July | Colmar to Montbéliard | 175.5 km (109.1 mi) | Hilly stage | Didier Rous (FRA) |
| 19 | 25 July | Montbéliard to Dijon | 172.0 km (106.9 mi) | Flat stage | Mario Traversoni (ITA) |
| 20 | 26 July | Disneyland Paris | 63.0 km (39.1 mi) | Individual time trial | Abraham Olano (ESP) |
| 21 | 27 July | Disneyland Paris to Paris (Champs-Élysées) | 149.5 km (92.9 mi) | Flat stage | Nicola Minali (ITA) |
| | Total | | 3,950 km (2,454 mi) | | |

== Race overview ==
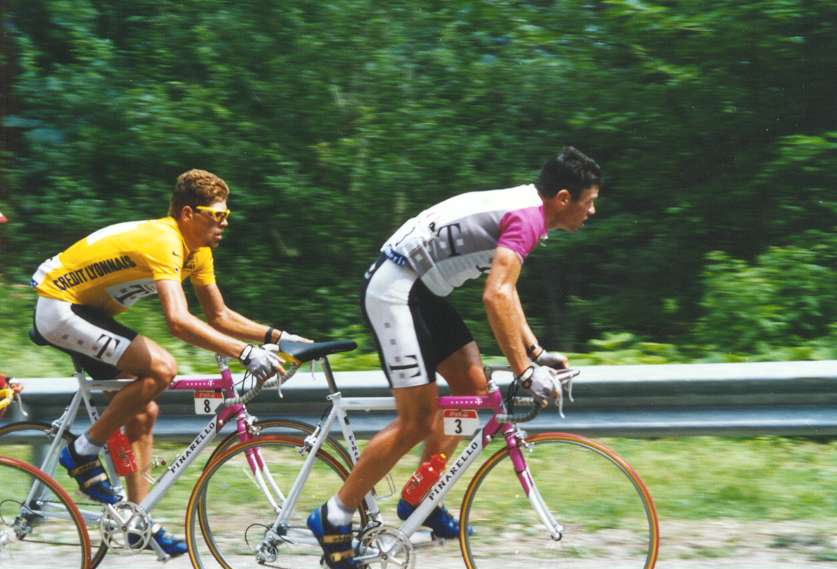
Jan Ullrich wearing the race leader's yellow jersey as the Tour passed through the Vosges mountains

The Prologue was won by Time Trial Specialist Chris Boardman giving him the Yellow Jersey for stage one with Ullrich just two seconds behind. Defending champion Bjarne Riis, who had been preparing for and seeking a repeat victory with Ullrich acting as his Super-Domestique finished outside the top 10 but was in no way concerned as he had come into the Tour in good form. The first four stages were flat stages, the first two of which were won by the infamous Italian sprinter Mario Cipollini with the third going to Erik Zabel and the fourth being won by Nicola Minali. Cipollini would wear the Yellow Jersey following the first few stages due to bonus seconds during the sprint finishes. During the 261 km stage five from Chantonnay to Le Chatre Cédric Vasseur survived a breakaway and finished nearly two and a half minutes ahead of the Peloton to claim the stage win and the Yellow Jersey, which he would hold on to until the race reached the high mountains.

Stage 6 was won by Jeroen Blijlevens in a sprint finish with Djamolidine Abdoujaparov finishing 2nd which would be his highest placing in this final TDF of his impressive career. Stages 7 and 8 followed rounding out the first week with sprint finishes, both of which were won by Erik Zabel as he bested Jaan Kirsipuu and Blijlevens in stage 7 and Minali and Blijlevens in stage 8. Zabel had donned the Green Jersey following stage 3 and would hold it all the way to Paris. Stage 9 was the first stage in the Pyrenees which included the Col d'Aspin and Col du Tourmalet as two of the five categorized climbs. Laurent Brochard won the stage with the elite group of Richard Virenque, Pantani and Ullrich finishing 0:14 behind. Surprisingly to some defending champion Riis lost nearly thirty seconds to the other contenders coming across in 8th putting him in a tie for 4th in the overall standings with Virenque at 1:43 behind Vasseur after the first major mountain stage. Spaniard Abraham Olano was in 3rd at 1:14 behind and the next closest GC favorite was Ullrich 0:14 behind him.

Stage 10 was another high mountain stage with five climbs and was won convincingly by Ullrich by 1:06 over Virenque and Pantani as Riis and Olano each lost more than three minutes. With the victory Ullrich became the first German rider to wear the maillot jaune since Klaus-Peter Thaler in the 1978 Tour de France and only 3rd overall as "Didi" Dietrich Thurau wore it for 15 days in the 1977 Tour de France. Stage 11 was an intermediate stage in which Laurent Desbiens survived to finish 0:18 ahead of the bunch together with two other riders whom he outsprinted to take the stage win. There were no major attacks by the GC riders in this stage so going into the ITT in Stage 12 Ullrich was convincingly in the lead at 2:38 over Virenque, 4:46 over Olano and 4:53 over his teammate Riis, who at this point remained confident he was still the leader of Team Telekom with Ullrich continuing to ride for him as a Super-Domestique.

The individual time trial extinguished any and all doubts who was in command of the race as Ullrich put more than three minutes into all of his competitors and teammates with 2nd place Virenque now approaching a six-minute deficit in the overall standings and Pantani, Olano and Riis each being eight minutes or more behind.

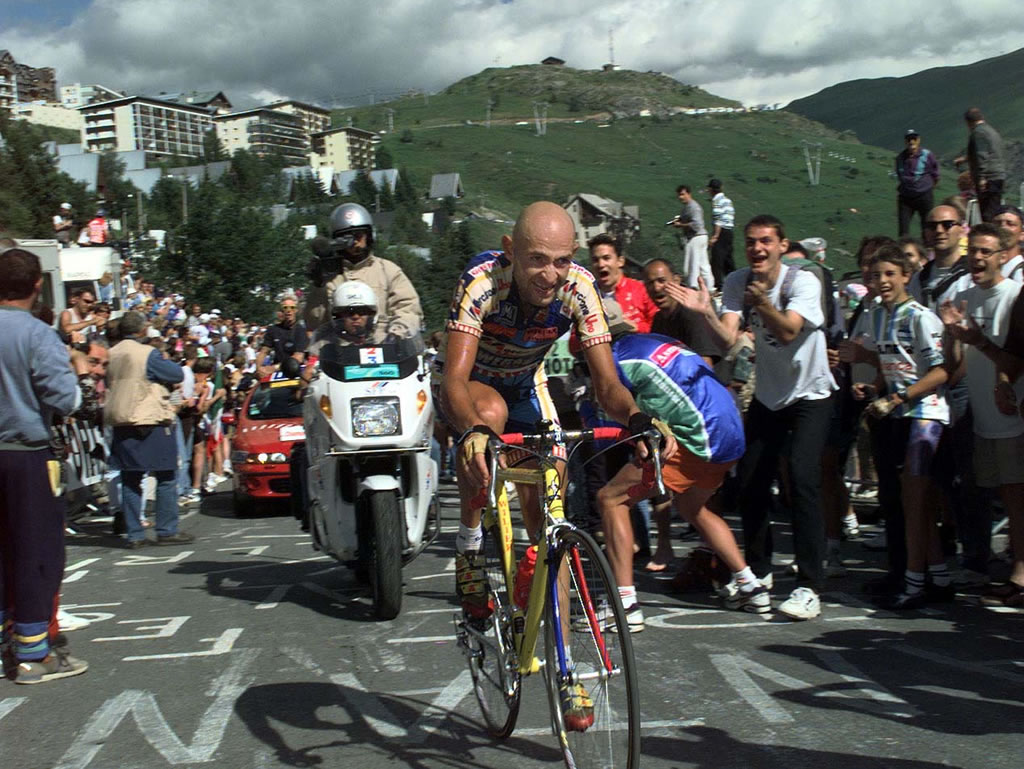
Marco Pantani climbing towards the finish of stage 13 at Alpe d'Huez

Stage 13 was Alpe d'Huez and the only rider able to drop Ullrich was Pantani who had to put in one of the fastest recorded times up Alpe d'Huez in TDF history in order to do so. Virenque finished 3rd 1:27 behind Pantani and Francesco Casagrande finished 4th on the stage while also moving to 6th place in the overall standings. Riis finished 5th, losing nearly another two minutes to Ullrich. In stage 14 Virenque made an attack to win back time on Ullrich, helped by his entire team. The margin was never more than two minutes, and Ullrich was able to get back to Virenque before the final climb. Virenque won the stage, but Ullrich finished in the same time. In stage 15 it was the Pirate attacking and winning his second stage and while he remained more than ten minutes behind Ullrich he did jump Riis in the standings to move in the final podium position.

Ullrich remained fully in command as the race progressed and aside from suffering a major crash or failing a doping control there wasn't much chance of him losing the Tour. Stage 18 was the final mountain stage and included a rare climb up the Ballon d'Alsace, which was a popular stage early in TDF history but hadn't been included since the 1982 Tour de France and was added to the route for only the 4th time since World War II. Frenchman Didier Rous would win the stage beating the next closest breakaway riders in Pascal Hervé, Bobby Julich and Laurent Roux by more than five minutes to finish the mountain stages with there being no further changes among the general classification favorites.

The final ITT in Stage 20 was won by Olano with Ullrich taking second 0:45 back. The final stage on the Champs-Élysées was won by Nicola Minali who beat out Zabel, Blijlevens, Henk Vogel, Robbie McEwen and George Hincapie in the mass sprint finish. Afterwards on the podiums Erik Zabel was awarded the green jersey, Richard Virenque won the King of the Mountains as well as the Most Combative Rider, in 3rd place on the podium was Marco Pantani, in 2nd was Virenque and in 1st overall winning the best young rider award, as well as the yellow jersey as champion of the Tour de France was Jan Ullrich.

== Classification leadership and minor prizes ==
There were several classifications in the 1997 Tour de France. The most important was the general classification, calculated by adding each cyclist's finishing times on each stage. The cyclist with the least accumulated time was the race leader, identified by the yellow jersey; the winner of this classification is considered the winner of the Tour.

Additionally, there was a points classification, which awarded a green jersey. In the points classification, cyclists got points for finishing among the best in a stage finish, or in intermediate sprints. The cyclist with the most points lead the classification, and was identified with a green jersey.

There was also a mountains classification. The organisation had categorised some climbs as either hors catégorie, first, second, third, or fourth-category; points for this classification were won by the first cyclists that reached the top of these climbs first, with more points available for the higher-categorised climbs. The cyclist with the most points lead the classification, and wore a white jersey with red polka dots.

The fourth individual classification was the young rider classification, which was not marked by a jersey. This was decided the same way as the general classification, but only riders under 26 years were eligible.

For the team classification, the times of the best three cyclists per team on each stage were added; the leading team was the team with the lowest total time.

In addition, there was a combativity award given after each mass-start stage to the cyclist considered most combative. The decision was made by a jury composed of journalists who gave points. The cyclist with the most points from votes in all stages led the combativity classification. Richard Virenque won this classification, and was given overall the super-combativity award. The Souvenir Henri Desgrange was given in honour of Tour founder Henri Desgrange to the first rider to pass the summit of the Port d'Envalira on stage 10. This prize was won by Virenque for the third time, the most by any rider in Tour history.

Classification leadership by stage
| Stage | Winner | General classification | Points classification | Mountains classification | Young rider classification (Note: A white jersey was not awarded to the leader of the young rider classification between 1989 and 1999.) | Team classification | Combativity | |
| Stage | Winner | General classification | Points classification | Mountains classification | Young rider classification | Team classification | Award | Classification |
|---|---|---|---|---|---|---|---|---|
| P | Chris Boardman | Chris Boardman | Chris Boardman | Cyril Saugrain | Jan Ullrich | Team Telekom | no award | |
| 1 | Mario Cipollini | Mario Cipollini | Mario Cipollini | Artūras Kasputis | Jan Ullrich | Team Telekom | Artūras Kasputis | Artūras Kasputis |
| 2 | Mario Cipollini | Mario Cipollini | Mario Cipollini | Laurent Brochard | Jan Ullrich | Team Telekom | Thierry Gouvenou | Thierry Gouvenou |
| 3 | Erik Zabel | Mario Cipollini | Erik Zabel | Laurent Brochard | Jan Ullrich | Team Telekom | François Simon | Thierry Gouvenou |
| 4 | Nicola Minali | Mario Cipollini | Erik Zabel | Laurent Brochard | Jan Ullrich | Team Telekom | Philippe Gaumont | Thierry Gouvenou |
| 5 | Cédric Vasseur | Cédric Vasseur | Erik Zabel | Laurent Brochard | Jan Ullrich | GAN | Cédric Vasseur | Cédric Vasseur |
| 6 | Jeroen Blijlevens | Cédric Vasseur | Erik Zabel | Laurent Brochard | Jan Ullrich | GAN | Pascal Lance | Cédric Vasseur |
| 7 | Erik Zabel | Cédric Vasseur | Erik Zabel | Laurent Brochard | Jan Ullrich | GAN | Adriano Baffi | Cédric Vasseur |
| 8 | Erik Zabel | Cédric Vasseur | Erik Zabel | Laurent Brochard | Jan Ullrich | GAN | Fabio Baldato | Cédric Vasseur |
| 9 | Laurent Brochard | Cédric Vasseur | Erik Zabel | Laurent Brochard | Jan Ullrich | Team Telekom | Pascal Hervé | Cédric Vasseur |
| 10 | Jan Ullrich | Jan Ullrich | Erik Zabel | Richard Virenque | Jan Ullrich | Festina–Lotus | Jean-Philippe Dojwa | Cédric Vasseur |
| 11 | Laurent Desbiens | Jan Ullrich | Erik Zabel | Richard Virenque | Jan Ullrich | Festina–Lotus | Philippe Gaumont | Cédric Vasseur |
| 12 | Jan Ullrich | Jan Ullrich | Erik Zabel | Richard Virenque | Jan Ullrich | Team Telekom | no award | Cédric Vasseur |
| 13 | Marco Pantani | Jan Ullrich | Erik Zabel | Richard Virenque | Jan Ullrich | Team Telekom | Nicola Loda | Cédric Vasseur |
| 14 | Richard Virenque | Jan Ullrich | Erik Zabel | Richard Virenque | Jan Ullrich | Team Telekom | Richard Virenque | Richard Virenque |
| 15 | Marco Pantani | Jan Ullrich | Erik Zabel | Richard Virenque | Jan Ullrich | Team Telekom | Laurent Jalabert | Richard Virenque |
| 16 | Christophe Mengin | Jan Ullrich | Erik Zabel | Richard Virenque | Jan Ullrich | Team Telekom | Stéphane Heulot | Richard Virenque |
| 17 | Neil Stephens | Jan Ullrich | Erik Zabel | Richard Virenque | Jan Ullrich | Team Telekom | Neil Stephens | Richard Virenque |
| 18 | Didier Rous | Jan Ullrich | Erik Zabel | Richard Virenque | Jan Ullrich | Team Telekom | Didier Rous | Richard Virenque |
| 19 | Mario Traversoni | Jan Ullrich | Erik Zabel | Richard Virenque | Jan Ullrich | Team Telekom | Bart Voskamp | Richard Virenque |
| 20 | Abraham Olano | Jan Ullrich | Erik Zabel | Richard Virenque | Jan Ullrich | Team Telekom | no award | Richard Virenque |
| 21 | Nicola Minali | Jan Ullrich | Erik Zabel | Richard Virenque | Jan Ullrich | Team Telekom | Pascal Chanteur | Richard Virenque |
| Final | | Jan Ullrich | Erik Zabel | Richard Virenque | Jan Ullrich | Team Telekom | Richard Virenque | |

- In stage 1, Jan Ullrich wore the green jersey.
- In stage 2, Tom Steels wore the green jersey.
- In stage 3, Erik Zabel wore the green jersey.

== Final standings ==
Legend
| A yellow jersey. | Denotes the winner of the general classification | A green jersey. | Denotes the winner of the points classification |
| A white jersey with red polka dots. | Denotes the winner of the mountains classification | | |

=== General classification ===
Final general classification (1–10)
| Rank | Rider | Team | Time |
|---|---|---|---|
| 1 | Jan Ullrich (GER) | Team Telekom | 100h 30' 35" |
| 2 | Richard Virenque (FRA) | Festina–Lotus | + 9' 09" |
| 3 | Marco Pantani (ITA) | Mercatone Uno | + 14' 03" |
| 4 | Abraham Olano (ESP) | Banesto | + 15' 55" |
| 5 | Fernando Escartín (ESP) | Kelme–Costa Blanca | + 20' 32" |
| 6 | Francesco Casagrande (ITA) | Saeco–Estro | + 22' 47" |
| 7 | Bjarne Riis (DEN) | Team Telekom | + 26' 34" |
| 8 | José María Jiménez (ESP) | Banesto | + 31' 17" |
| 9 | Laurent Dufaux (SUI) | Festina–Lotus | + 31' 55" |
| 10 | Roberto Conti (ITA) | Mercatone Uno | + 32' 26" |

Final general classification (11–139)
| Rank | Rider | Team | Time |
|---|---|---|---|
| 11 | Beat Zberg (SUI) | Mercatone Uno | + 35' 41" |
| 12 | Oscar Camenzind (SUI) | Mapei–GB | + 35' 52" |
| 13 | Peter Luttenberger (AUT) | Rabobank | + 45' 39" |
| 14 | Manuel Beltrán (ESP) | Banesto | + 49' 34" |
| 15 | Jean-Cyril Robin (FRA) | U.S. Postal Service | + 58' 35" |
| 16 | Michael Boogerd (NED) | Rabobank | + 1h 00' 33" |
| 17 | Bobby Julich (USA) | Cofidis | + 1h 01' 10" |
| 18 | Daniele Nardello (ITA) | Mapei–GB | + 1h 01' 30" |
| 19 | Christophe Moreau (FRA) | Festina–Lotus | + 1h 02' 48" |
| 20 | Stéphane Heulot (FRA) | Française des Jeux | + 1h 06' 13" |
| 21 | Udo Bölts (GER) | Team Telekom | + 1h 09' 02" |
| 22 | Hernán Buenahora (COL) | Banesto | + 1h 13' 48" |
| 23 | Laurent Roux (FRA) | TVM–Farm Frites | + 1h 17' 44" |
| 24 | Massimo Podenzana (ITA) | Mercatone Uno | + 1h 20' 56" |
| 25 | Laurent Madouas (FRA) | Lotto–Mobistar–Isoglass | + 1h 24' 58" |
| 26 | Pascal Chanteur (FRA) | Casino | + 1h 25' 48" |
| 27 | Santiago Blanco (ESP) | Banesto | + 1h 29' 18" |
| 28 | Thierry Bourguignon (FRA) | BigMat–Auber 93 | + 1h 29' 35" |
| 29 | Ángel Casero (ESP) | Banesto | + 1h 35' 11" |
| 30 | Alberto Elli (ITA) | Casino | + 1h 37' 23" |
| 31 | Laurent Brochard (FRA) | Festina–Lotus | + 1h 39' 15" |
| 32 | François Simon (FRA) | GAN | + 1h 40' 40" |
| 33 | Orlando Rodrigues (POR) | Banesto | + 1h 42' 33" |
| 34 | Georg Totschnig (AUT) | Team Telekom | + 1h 42' 49" |
| 35 | Joona Laukka (FIN) | Festina–Lotus | + 1h 43' 05" |
| 36 | Pascal Hervé (FRA) | Festina–Lotus | + 1h 44' 04" |
| 37 | Javier Pascual (ESP) | Banesto | + 1h 45' 52" |
| 38 | Kevin Livingston (USA) | Cofidis | + 1h 46' 23" |
| 39 | Peter Farazijn (BEL) | Lotto–Mobistar–Isoglass | + 1h 47' 54" |
| 40 | Cédric Vasseur (FRA) | GAN | + 1h 54' 02" |
| 41 | Marcello Siboni (ITA) | Mercatone Uno | + 1h 56' 05" |
| 42 | Fabrice Gougot (FRA) | Casino | + 1h 56' 15" |
| 43 | Laurent Jalabert (FRA) | ONCE | + 1h 58' 32" |
| 44 | Viatcheslav Ekimov (RUS) | U.S. Postal Service | + 2h 01' 23" |
| 45 | Didier Rous (FRA) | Festina–Lotus | + 2h 01' 46" |
| 46 | Gianluca Bortolami (ITA) | Festina–Lotus | + 2h 03' 35" |
| 47 | Massimiliano Lelli (ITA) | Saeco–Estro | + 2h 05' 26" |
| 48 | Christophe Mengin (FRA) | Française des Jeux | + 2h 06' 57" |
| 49 | Peter Meinert (DEN) | U.S. Postal Service | + 2h 07' 38" |
| 50 | Frank Vandenbroucke (BEL) | Mapei–GB | + 2h 09' 34" |
| 51 | Rolf Aldag (GER) | Team Telekom | + 2h 10' 36" |
| 52 | Erik Breukink (NED) | Rabobank | + 2h 13' 44" |
| 53 | Giuseppe Guerini (ITA) | Team Polti | + 2h 14' 21" |
| 54 | Neil Stephens (AUS) | Festina–Lotus | + 2h 23' 40" |
| 55 | Juan José de los Ángeles (ESP) | Banesto | + 2h 24' 12" |
| 56 | Andrea Peron (ITA) | Française des Jeux | + 2h 24' 48" |
| 57 | Andrea Tafi (ITA) | Mapei–GB | + 2h 25' 53" |
| 58 | Davide Rebellin (ITA) | Française des Jeux | + 2h 29' 54" |
| 59 | Zenon Jaskuła (POL) | Mapei–GB | + 2h 30' 15" |
| 60 | Jens Heppner (GER) | Team Telekom | + 2h 31' 12" |
| 61 | Marino Alonso (ESP) | Banesto | + 2h 32' 25" |
| 62 | Patrick Jonker (AUS) | Rabobank | + 2h 33' 38" |
| 63 | Aitor Garmendia (ESP) | ONCE | + 2h 35' 30" |
| 64 | Maarten den Bakker (NED) | TVM–Farm Frites | + 2h 38' 30" |
| 65 | Jon Odriozola (ESP) | Batik–Del Monte | + 2h 40' 08" |
| 66 | Erik Zabel (GER) | Team Telekom | + 2h 41' 16" |
| 67 | Maximilian Sciandri (GBR) | Française des Jeux | + 2h 42' 24" |
| 68 | Rolf Sørensen (DEN) | Rabobank | + 2h 43' 47" |
| 69 | Tyler Hamilton (USA) | U.S. Postal Service | + 2h 47' 51" |
| 70 | Íñigo Cuesta (ESP) | ONCE | + 2h 50' 02" |
| 71 | Francisco Benitez (ESP) | Banesto | + 2h 53' 37" |
| 72 | Daniele Sgnaolin (ITA) | Roslotto–ZG Mobili | + 2h 54' 00" |
| 73 | Marco Zen (ITA) | Mapei–GB | + 2h 54' 29" |
| 74 | Giorgio Furlan (ITA) | Saeco–Estro | + 2h 56' 21" |
| 75 | José Luis Arrieta (ESP) | Banesto | + 2h 57' 04" |
| 76 | Miguel Arroyo (MEX) | BigMat–Auber 93 | + 3h 04' 05" |
| 77 | José Angel Vidal (ESP) | Banesto | + 3h 04' 27" |
| 78 | Jose-Roberto Sierra (ESP) | ONCE | + 3h 04' 58" |
| 79 | Frankie Andreu (USA) | Cofidis | + 3h 05' 00" |
| 80 | Oscar Pelliccioli (ITA) | Mercatone Uno | + 3h 07' 09" |
| 81 | Erik Dekker (NED) | Rabobank | + 3h 07' 17" |
| 82 | Jesper Skibby (DEN) | TVM–Farm Frites | + 3h 07' 50" |
| 83 | Dominique Rault (FRA) | Mutuelle de Seine-et-Marne | + 3h 09' 58" |
| 84 | Christian Henn (GER) | Team Telekom | + 3h 10' 01" |
| 85 | Francisco Mauleón (ESP) | ONCE | + 3h 11' 00" |
| 86 | Gianluca Valoti (ITA) | Team Polti | + 3h 11' 57" |
| 87 | Dariusz Baranowski (POL) | U.S. Postal Service | + 3h 12' 45" |
| 88 | Thierry Gouvenou (FRA) | BigMat–Auber 93 | + 3h 12' 52" |
| 89 | Wilfried Peeters (BEL) | Mapei–GB | + 3h 13' 33" |
| 90 | Paul Van Hyfte (BEL) | Lotto–Mobistar–Isoglass | + 3h 18' 11" |
| 91 | Marco Artunghi (ITA) | Mercatone Uno | + 3h 18' 29" |
| 92 | Íñigo Chaurreau (ESP) | Team Polti | + 3h 20' 28" |
| 93 | Artūras Kasputis (LIT) | Casino | + 3h 22' 01" |
| 94 | Christophe Agnolutto (FRA) | Casino | + 3h 22' 57" |
| 95 | Marco Saligari (ITA) | Casino | + 3h 23' 36" |
| 96 | Marty Jemison (USA) | U.S. Postal Service | + 3h 25' 21" |
| 97 | Giuseppe Tartaggia (ITA) | Batik–Del Monte | + 3h 25' 54" |
| 98 | Bart Voskamp (NED) | TVM–Farm Frites | + 3h 26' 27" |
| 99 | Henk Vogels jr (AUS) | GAN | + 3h 26' 46" |
| 100 | Mario Traversoni (ITA) | Mercatone Uno | + 3h 27' 30" |
| 101 | Laurent Genty (FRA) | BigMat–Auber 93 | + 3h 27' 56" |
| 102 | Peter Van Petegem (BEL) | TVM–Farm Frites | + 3h 29' 20" |
| 103 | Gian Matteo Fagnini (ITA) | Saeco–Estro | + 3h 29' 34" |
| 104 | George Hincapie (USA) | U.S. Postal Service | + 3h 31' 08" |
| 105 | Arnaud Prétot (FRA) | GAN | + 3h 32' 07" |
| 106 | Flavio Vanzella (ITA) | Française des Jeux | + 3h 32' 52" |
| 107 | Servais Knaven (NED) | TVM–Farm Frites | + 3h 34' 52" |
| 108 | Francisco Cabello (ESP) | Banesto | + 3h 35' 42" |
| 109 | Stuart O'Grady (AUS) | GAN | + 3h 35' 56" |
| 110 | Nicola Loda (ITA) | MG Maglificio–Technogym | + 3h 39' 10" |
| 111 | Frédérick Guesdon (FRA) | Française des Jeux | + 3h 41' 04" |
| 112 | Bruno Cenghialta (ITA) | Batik–Del Monte | + 3h 41' 06" |
| 113 | Serhiy Utchakov (UKR) | Team Polti | + 3h 42' 48" |
| 114 | Frédéric Moncassin (FRA) | GAN | + 3h 45' 03" |
| 115 | Christophe Rinero (FRA) | Cofidis | + 3h 45' 14" |
| 116 | Gilberto Simoni (ITA) | MG Maglificio–Technogym | + 3h 45' 33" |
| 117 | Robbie McEwen (AUS) | Rabobank | + 3h 45' 47" |
| 118 | Giovanni Lombardi (ITA) | Team Telekom | + 3h 45' 59" |
| 119 | Adriano Baffi (ITA) | U.S. Postal Service | + 3h 46' 55" |
| 120 | Luca Scinto (ITA) | MG Maglificio–Technogym | + 3h 48' 04" |
| 121 | Marcelino García (ESP) | ONCE | + 3h 49' 33" |
| 122 | Nicola Minali (ITA) | Batik–Del Monte | + 3h 51' 26" |
| 123 | Mirko Crepaldi (ITA) | Team Polti | + 3h 51' 49" |
| 124 | Lauri Aus (EST) | Casino | + 3h 52' 31" |
| 125 | Gerrit de Vries (NED) | Team Polti | + 3h 54' 05" |
| 126 | Jeroen Blijlevens (NED) | TVM–Farm Frites | + 3h 54' 10" |
| 127 | Laurent Desbiens (FRA) | Cofidis | + 3h 54' 32" |
| 128 | Tristan Hoffman (NED) | TVM–Farm Frites | + 3h 54' 49" |
| 129 | Carlo Finco (ITA) | MG Maglificio–Technogym | + 3h 57' 27" |
| 130 | Rossano Brasi (ITA) | Team Polti | + 4h 02' 11" |
| 131 | Pascal Deramé (FRA) | U.S. Postal Service | + 4h 04' 57" |
| 132 | Matteo Tosatto (ITA) | MG Maglificio–Technogym | + 4h 06' 05" |
| 133 | Gianluca Pierobon (ITA) | Batik–Del Monte | + 4h 06' 53" |
| 134 | Eros Poli (ITA) | GAN | + 4h 11' 22" |
| 135 | Nicolas Jalabert (FRA) | Cofidis | + 4h 11' 31" |
| 136 | Torsten Schmidt (GER) | Roslotto–ZG Mobili | + 4h 15' 48" |
| 137 | Philipp Buschor (SUI) | Saeco–Estro | + 4h 17' 35" |
| 138 | Stéphane Cueff (FRA) | Mutuelle de Seine-et-Marne | + 4h 18' 18" |
| 139 | Philippe Gaumont (FRA) | Cofidis | + 4h 26' 09" |

=== Points classification ===
Final points classification (1–10)
| Rank | Rider | Team | Points |
|---|---|---|---|
| 1 | Erik Zabel (GER) | Team Telekom | 350 |
| 2 | Frédéric Moncassin (FRA) | GAN | 223 |
| 3 | Mario Traversoni (ITA) | Mercatone Uno | 198 |
| 4 | Jeroen Blijlevens (NED) | TVM–Farm Frites | 192 |
| 5 | Nicola Minali (ITA) | Batik–Del Monte | 156 |
| 6 | Jan Ullrich (GER) | Team Telekom | 154 |
| 7 | Robbie McEwen (AUS) | Rabobank | 151 |
| 8 | Richard Virenque (FRA) | Festina–Lotus | 151 |
| 9 | François Simon (FRA) | GAN | 145 |
| 10 | Adriano Baffi (ITA) | U.S. Postal Service | 131 |

=== Mountains classification ===
Final mountains classification (1–10)
| Rank | Rider | Team | Points |
|---|---|---|---|
| 1 | Richard Virenque (FRA) | Festina–Lotus | 579 |
| 2 | Jan Ullrich (GER) | Team Telekom | 328 |
| 3 | Francesco Casagrande (ITA) | Saeco–Estro | 309 |
| 4 | Marco Pantani (ITA) | Mercatone Uno | 269 |
| 5 | Laurent Brochard (FRA) | Festina–Lotus | 241 |
| 6 | Laurent Dufaux (SWI) | Festina–Lotus | 212 |
| 7 | Pascal Hervé (FRA) | Festina–Lotus | 176 |
| 8 | Fernando Escartín (ESP) | Kelme–Costa Blanca | 141 |
| 9 | Bjarne Riis (DEN) | Team Telekom | 139 |
| 10 | José María Jiménez (ESP) | Banesto | 136 |

=== Young rider classification ===
Final young rider classification (1–10)
| Rank | Rider | Team | Time |
|---|---|---|---|
| 1 | Jan Ullrich (GER) | Team Telekom | 100h 30' 35" |
| 2 | Peter Luttenberger (AUT) | Rabobank | + 45' 39" |
| 3 | Michael Boogerd (NED) | Rabobank | + 1h 00' 33" |
| 4 | Daniele Nardello (ITA) | Mapei–GB | + 1h 01' 30" |
| 5 | Laurent Roux (FRA) | TVM–Farm Frites | + 1h 17' 44" |
| 6 | Santiago Blanco (ESP) | Banesto | + 1h 29' 18" |
| 7 | Ángel Luis Casero (ESP) | Banesto | + 1h 35' 11" |
| 8 | Joona Laukka (FIN) | Festina–Lotus | + 1h 43' 05" |
| 9 | Kevin Livingston (USA) | Cofidis | + 1h 46' 23 |
| 10 | Frank Vandenbroucke (BEL) | Mapei–GB | + 2h 09' 34 |

=== Team classification ===
Final team classification (1–10)
| Rank | Team | Time |
|---|---|---|
| 1 | Team Telekom | 310h 51' 30" |
| 2 | Mercatone Uno | + 31' 56" |
| 3 | Festina–Lotus | + 47' 52" |
| 4 | Banesto | + 1h 05' 15" |
| 5 | Kelme–Costa Blanca | + 2h 20' 22" |
| 6 | Mapei–GB | + 2h 28' 14" |
| 7 | Rabobank | + 2h 40' 30" |
| 8 | Saeco–Estro | + 4h 06' 13" |
| 9 | Française des Jeux | + 4h 15' 59" |
| 10 | U.S. Postal Service | + 4h26' 19" |

=== Combativity classification ===
Final combativity classification (1–3)
| Rank | Rider | Team | Points |
|---|---|---|---|
| 1 | Richard Virenque (FRA) | Festina–Lotus | 54 |
| 2 | Cédric Vasseur (FRA) | GAN | 35 |
| 3 | Marco Pantani (ITA) | Mercatone Uno | 34 |

== Aftermath ==
After Ullrich's domination of the 1997 Tour de France at his young age, it was believed that Ullrich would dominate the Tour de France for the next years. However, Ullrich would never win the Tour again, although he did reach the podium four more times finishing second to Pantani in 1998 and standing 2nd on the podium to Lance Armstrong three times. He also reached the podium in the 2005 Tour de France, but that result was later voided. Ullrich would win another Grand Tour however, the 1999 Vuelta a España.

== Bibliography ==
- Augendre, Jacques (2016). "Guide historique" [Historical guide] (PDF). Tour de France (in French). Paris: Amaury Sport Organisation. Archived (PDF) from the original on 17 August 2016.
- Nauright, John; Parrish, Charles (2012). Sports Around the World: History, Culture, and Practice. Vol. 2. Santa Barbara, California: ABC-CLIO. ISBN 978-1-59884-300-2.
- van den Akker, Pieter (2018). Tour de France Rules and Statistics: 1903–2018. Self-published. ISBN 978-1-79398-080-9.
