= Peter Farazijn =

Belgian cyclist

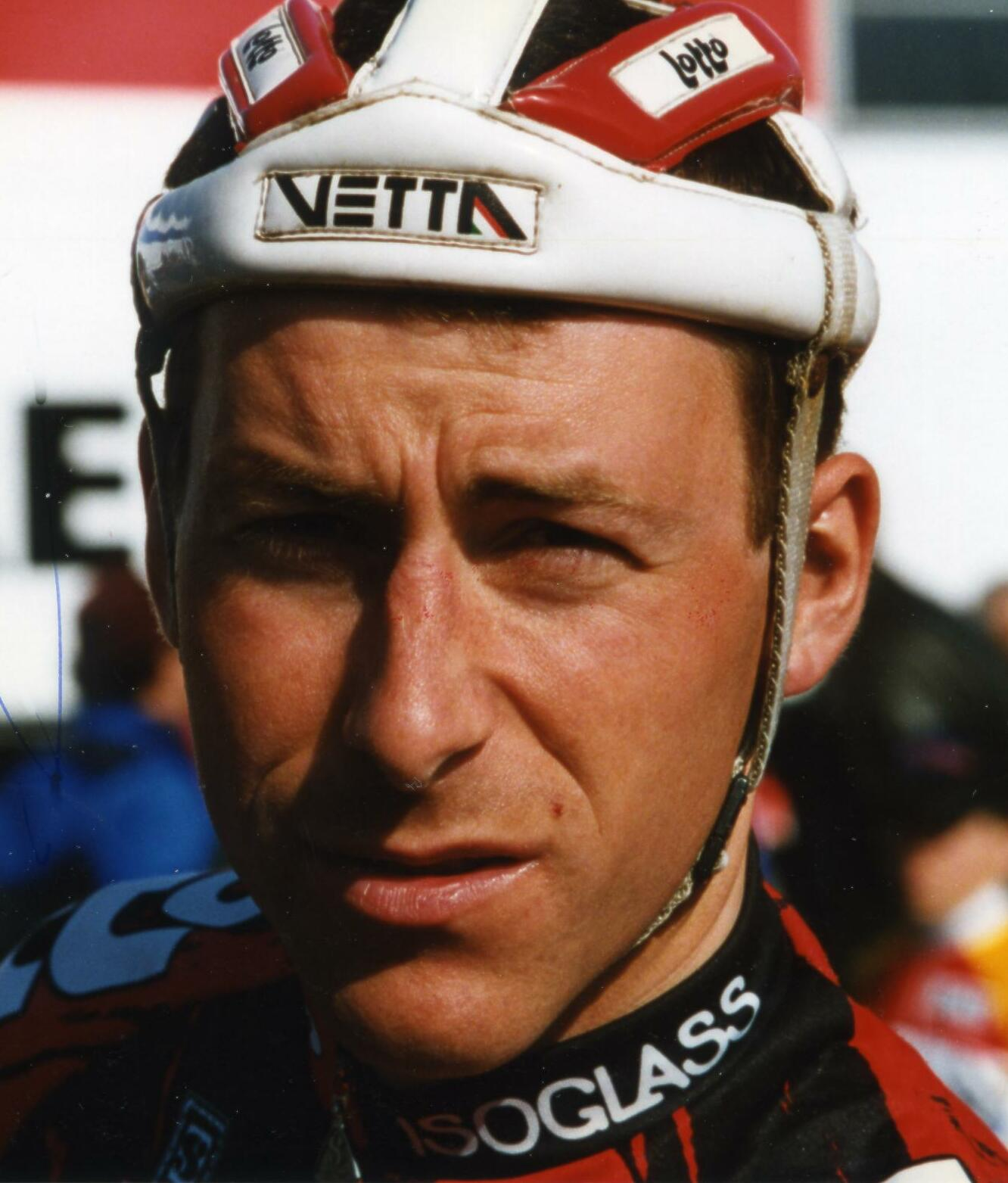

Personal information
- Born: 27 January 1969 (age 57) Diksmuide, Belgium
- Height: 1.80 m (5 ft 11 in)
- Weight: 69 kg (152 lb; 10 st 12 lb)

Cycling career
- Sport: Cycling
- Discipline: Road
- Role: Rider

Amateur team
- 1990: Weinmann (stagiaire)

Professional teams
- 1991: Weinmann
- 1992: Team Telekom
- 1993-1998: Lotto-Mobistar
- 1999-2005: Cofidis

Peter Farazijn (born 27 January 1969 in Diksmuide) is a Belgian former racing cyclist.

== Palmarès ==
1989
2nd Tour de Wallonie
1990
2nd De Vlaamse Pijl
3rd Kattekoers
1994
1st Grand Prix de Wallonie
1996
3rd Vuelta a Andalucía
2000
6th La Flèche Wallonne
8th Gent–Wevelgem

== Grand Tour results ==
=== Tour de France ===
- 1993: 135th
- 1994: DNF
- 1995: 105th
- 1997: 122nd
- 1997: 39th
- 1998: 19th
- 1999: 63rd
- 2004: 107th

=== Vuelta a España ===
- 2001: 58th
- 2003: DNF
