= Xavier Jan =

French cyclist

Personal information
- Born: 2 June 1970 (age 56) Dinan, France

Cycling career
- Sport: Cycling
- Current team: Retired
- Discipline: Road
- Role: Rider

Professional teams
- 1996: Force Sud
- 1997–2000: Française des Jeux
- 2001–2002: BigMat–Auber 93

Xavier Jan (born 2 June 1970) is a former French racing cyclist. He rode in 3 editions of the Tour de France and 1 Vuelta a España.

== Career highlights ==
=== Major results ===
1991
3rd Overall Ruban Granitier Breton
1994
1st Overall Ronde de l'Isard
1995
1st Stage 10 Mi-Août Bretonne
3rd Overall Ronde de l'Isard
1997
2nd Polymultipliée Hautil
3rd Grand Prix de Plumelec-Morbihan
4th Milano–Torino
7th Japan Cup
8th Trophée des Grimpeurs
1999
4th Japan Cup
2000
7th Tour du Finistère
2001
1st Overall Ster Elektrotoer
3rd Tour du Finistère
2002
1st Grand Prix d'Ouverture La Marseillaise
7th Overall Volta ao Algarve

=== Grand Tour general classification results timeline ===
Grand Tour	1998	1999	2000	2001	2002
Giro d'Italia	—	—	—	—	—
Tour de France	77	—	76	DNF	—
Vuelta a España	—	—	—	—	DNF

Legend
DSQ	Disqualified
DNF	Did not finish
