= Carlo Finco =

Italian cyclist

Personal information
- Born: 27 May 1968 (age 58) Curtarolo, Italy
- Height: 1.88 m (6 ft 2 in)
- Weight: 74 kg (163 lb; 11 st 9 lb)

Cycling career
- Sport: Cycling
- Discipline: Road
- Role: Rider

Professional teams
- 1993–1994: Festina–Lotus
- 1995: ZG Mobili–Selle Italia
- 1996–1997: MG Maglificio–Technogym
- 1998–2000: Ballan
- 2001: De Nardi–Pasta Montegrappa

Carlo Finco (born 27 May 1968) is a former Italian cyclist.

== Career achievements ==
=== Major results ===
1997
2nd National Time Trial Championships
3rd Giro della Romagna
3rd Trofeo Matteotti
1999
1st stage 1 Uniqa Classic
2nd Trofeo Melinda

Grand Tour	1993	1994	1995	1996	1997	1998	1999	2000
Giro d'Italia	56	—	62	25	—	65	—	—
Tour de France	—	—	—	DNF	129	—	—	—
Vuelta a España	—	—	—	—	—	—	—	81

Legend
—	Did not compete
DNF	Did not finish
