= Bart Voskamp =

Dutch cyclist (born 1968)

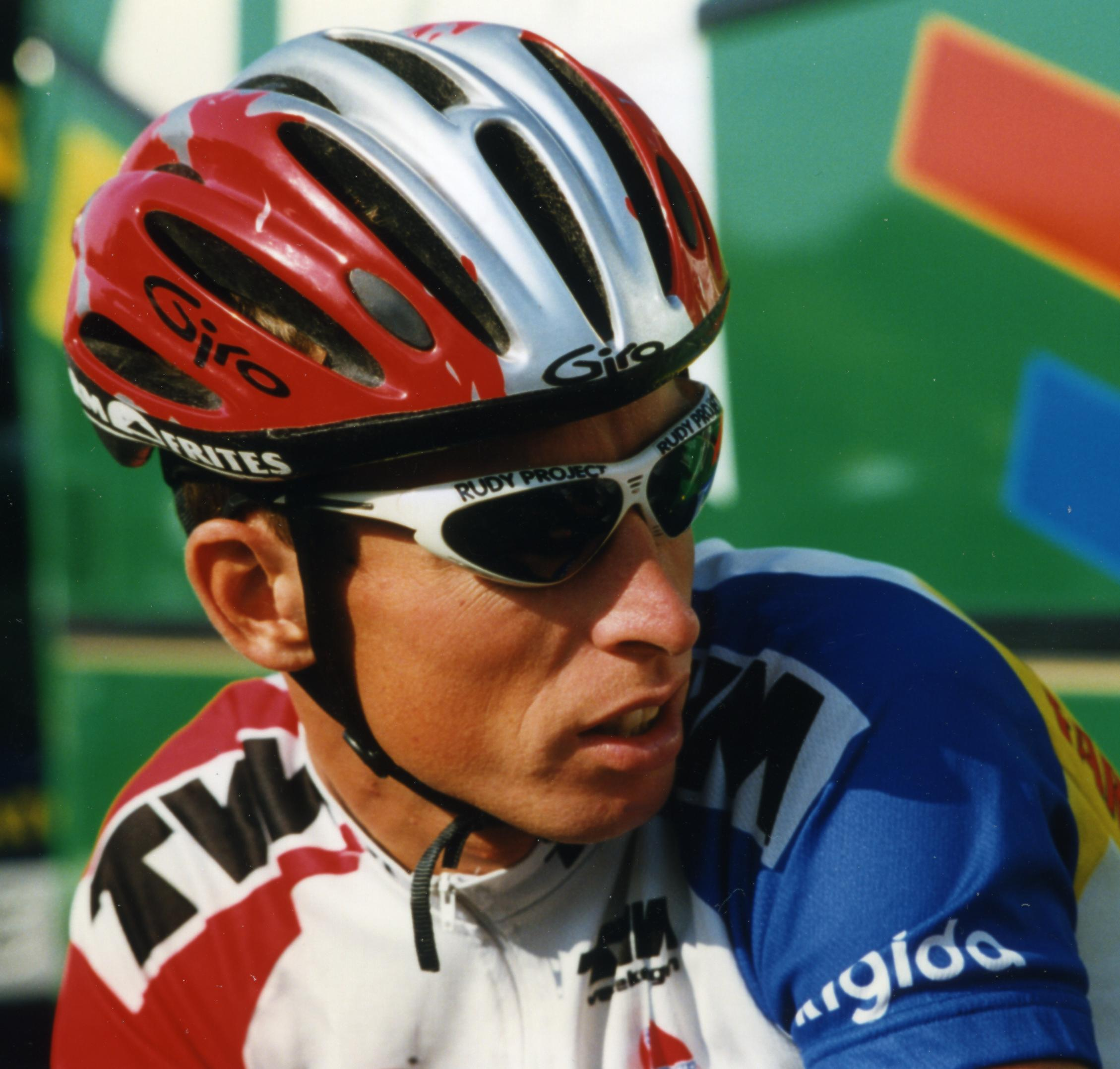

Personal information
- Full name: Bart Voskamp
- Born: 6 June 1968 (age 58) Wageningen, Netherlands

Cycling career
- Sport: Cycling
- Discipline: Road
- Role: Rider

Professional teams
- 1993–1999: TVM–Bison Kit
- 2000: Team Polti
- 2001–2003: Rabobank
- 2004: Chocolade Jacques–Wincor Nixdorf
- 2005: Shimano–Memory Corp

Major wins
- Grand Tours Tour de France 1 individual stage (1996) Vuelta a España 2 individual stages (1994, 1997) Stage races Tour of Belgium (2002) One-day races and Classics National Time Trial Championships (1991, 1999, 2001)

Bertus ("Bart") Voskamp (born 6 June 1968 in Wageningen, Gelderland) is a retired road bicycle racer from the Netherlands, who was a professional rider from 1993 to 2005. He competed in five Tours de France. He also competed in the team time trial at the 1992 Summer Olympics.

In the 1997 Tour de France, on stage 19, Bart Voskamp crossed the finish line first, just before Jens Heppner. However, both cyclists were disqualified for touching each other during the sprint, so the victory went to former third place Mario Traversoni.

== Major results ==
1991
1st Time trial, National Road Championships
1st Stages 4 & 8b (ITT) Olympia's Tour
1992
1st Grote Rivierenprijs
1st Stage 7b (ITT) Olympia's Tour
3rd Overall Tour de l'Avenir
1994
1st Stage 17 Vuelta a España
1996
1st Profronde van Surhuisterveen
1st Stage 18 Tour de France
2nd Road race, National Road Championships
1997
1st Stage 8 Vuelta a España
3rd Overall Grand Prix du Midi Libre
3rd Nokere Koerse
1998
1st Profronde van Stiphout
1999
1st Time trial, National Road Championships
1st Profronde van Oostvoorne
3rd La Côte Picarde
2001
1st Time trial, National Road Championships
1st Henk Vos Memorial
1st Stages 2 & 4 (ITT) Ster Elektrotoer
2nd Nokere Koerse
4th Overall Deutschland Tour
5th Overall Ronde van Nederland
2002
1st Overall Tour of Belgium
1st Overall Ster Elektrotoer

1st Points classification
1st Stage 3

1st Profronde van Oostvoorne
2nd Overall Tour de Luxembourg

1st Stage 4 (ITT)

2nd Veenendaal–Veenendaal
3rd Rund um Düren
2003
1st Grand Prix Pino Cerami
2nd Time trial, National Road Championships
2nd Overall Tour of Belgium
4th Overall Danmark Rundt
2004
2nd Overall Tour of Belgium
3rd Time trial, National Road Championships
2005
3rd Gouden Pijl Emmen

=== Tour de France results ===
- 1995 – 113th
- 1996 – 99th
- 1997 – 98th
- 1998 – retired
- 2000 – 115th

== See also ==
- List of Dutch Olympic cyclists
