= Thierry Bourguignon =

French cyclist (born 1962)

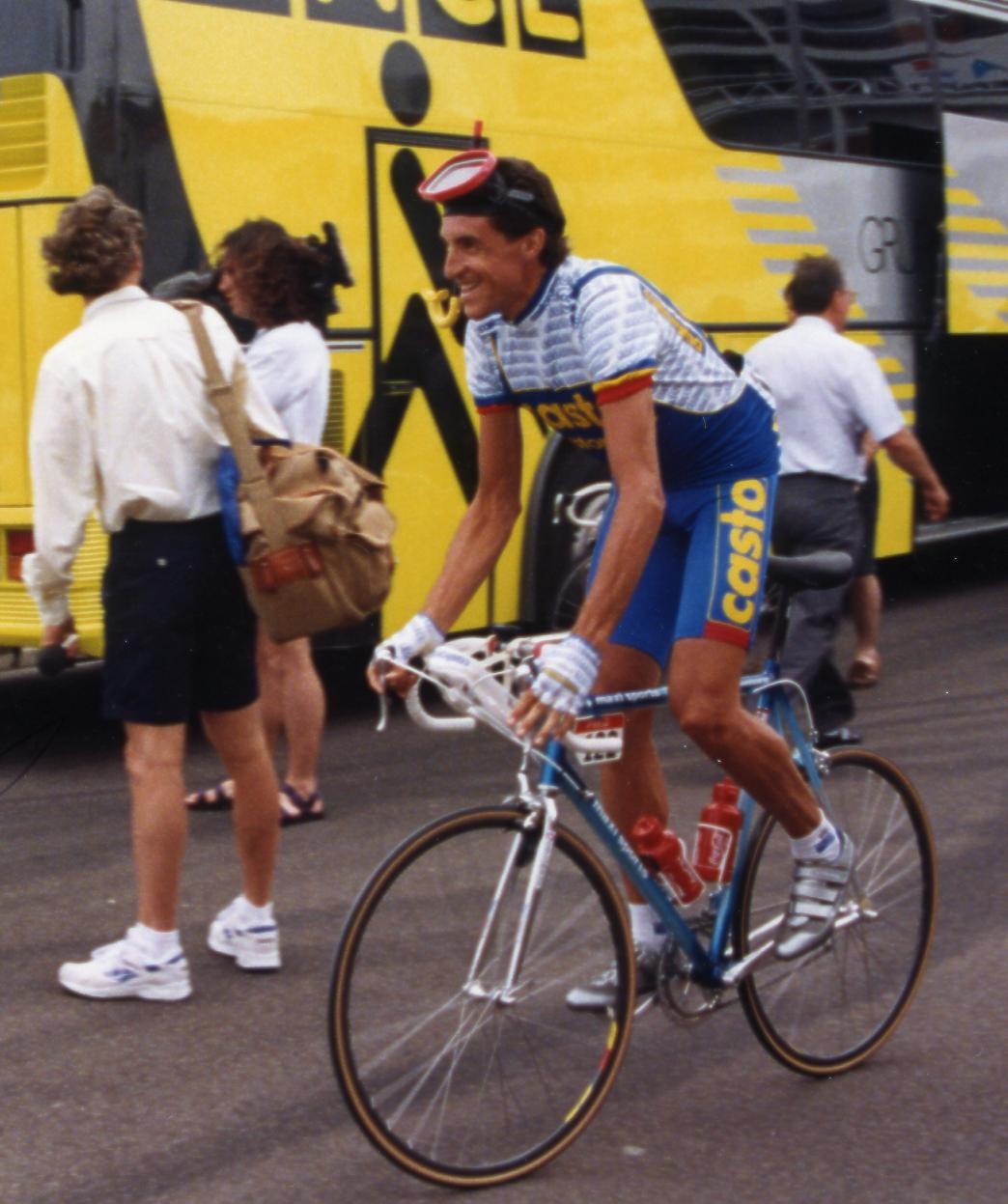
- Bourguignon at the 1993 Tour de France

Personal information
- Born: 19 December 1962 (age 63) La Mure, France
- Height: 1.85 m (6 ft 1 in)
- Weight: 72 kg (159 lb; 11 st 5 lb)

Cycling career
- Sport: Cycling
- Discipline: Road
- Role: Rider

Professional teams
- 1990–1991: Toshiba
- 1992–1994: Castorama
- 1995: Le Groupement
- 1996: Force Sud (until 6/15)
- 6/1996–2000: Aubervilliers 93

Thierry Bourguignon (born 19 December 1962 in La Mure) is a French former road cyclist.

== Major results ==
1988
1st Tour Nivernais Morvan
1990
1st Stage 2 Tour du Vaucluse
2nd Overall Tour du Vaucluse
3rd Cholet-Pays de Loire
1993
1st Overall Tour du Vaucluse
4th Overall Route du Sud
1995
1st Stage 2b Grand Prix du Midi Libre
3rd Cholet-Pays de Loire
1998
8th Overall Critérium du Dauphiné Libéré

== Grand Tour results ==
=== Tour de France ===
- 1991: 25th
- 1992: 29th
- 1993: 36th
- 1996: 62nd
- 1997: 28th
- 1998: 26th
- 1999: 48th

=== Vuelta a España ===
- 1990: 37th

=== Giro d'Italia ===
- 1993: 25th
- 1994: DNF
