= Laurent Desbiens =

French cyclist

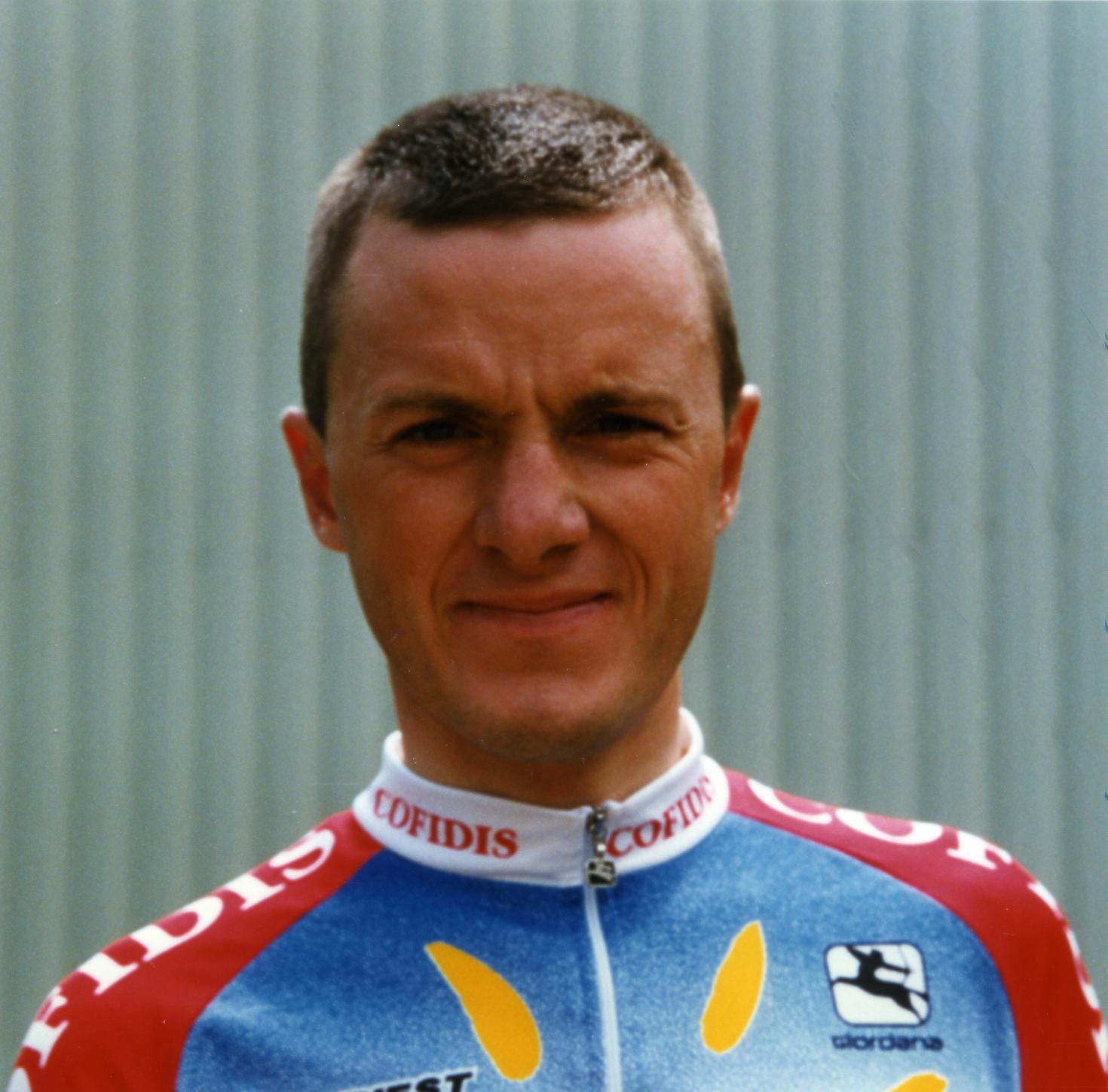

Personal information
- Full name: Laurent Desbiens
- Born: 16 September 1969 (age 57) Mons-en-Barœul, France
- Height: 1.77 m (5 ft 9 1/2 in)
- Weight: 69 kg (152 lb; 10 st 12 lb)

Cycling career
- Sport: Cycling
- Current team: Retired
- Discipline: Road
- Role: Rider

Professional teams
- 1991: Tonton Tapis–GB (stagiaire)
- 1992: Collstrop–Garden Wood
- 1993–1995: Castorama
- 1996: GAN
- 1997–2000: Cofidis
- 2001: Kelme–Costa Blanca

Major wins
- Four Days of Dunkirk (1993); 1 Stage Tour de France (1997)

Laurent Desbiens (born 16 September 1969) is a French former road cyclist, who competed professionally between 1992 and 2001. He won the 1993 Four Days of Dunkirk and won a stage in the 1997 Tour de France and wore the yellow jersey as leader of the general classification for two days in the 1998 Tour.

His name was on the list of doping tests published by the French Senate on 24 July 2013 that were collected during the 1998 Tour de France and found positive for EPO when retested in 2004.

== Major results ==
1991
2nd Overall Circuit Franco-Belge
1992
1st Cholet-Pays de Loire
6th Tour de Vendée
7th Overall Tour d'Armorique
8th Tour de Vendée
1993
1st Overall Four Days of Dunkirk

1st Stage 1

3rd Paris–Bourges
6th Overall Ronde van Nederland
8th Overall Route du Sud
1994
4th Overall Grand Prix du Midi Libre

1st Stage 3

10th Coppa Bernocchi
1995
6th Overall Tour du Limousin
6th GP Ouest–France
6th Grand Prix d'Isbergues
1996
1st Tour de Vendée
2nd Overall Tour de Luxembourg
2nd Overall Tour de l'Oise

1st Stage 4

3rd Trophée des Grimpeurs
3rd Cholet-Pays de Loire
6th Overall Four Days of Dunkirk
1997
1st Stage 11 Tour de France
1st Stage 1 Grand Prix du Midi Libre
9th Trophée des Grimpeurs
10th Tour de Vendée
1998
1st A Travers le Morbihan
Tour de France

Held Stages 8–9

2nd Trophée des Grimpeurs
2nd Tour de Vendée
5th Gent–Wevelgem
1999
1st Stage 4 Critérium du Dauphiné Libéré
1st Stage 4 Tour du Limousin
2nd Châteauroux Classic
2nd A Travers le Morbihan
2000
9th Gran Premio Bruno Beghelli
2001
1st Mountains classification, Tour de Romandie

=== Grand Tour general classification results timeline ===
Grand Tour	1993	1994	1995	1996	1997	1998	1999	2000	2001
Giro d'Italia	71	—	DNF	—	—	—	—	—	102
Tour de France	109	DNF	—	—	127	61	100	DNF	DNF
Vuelta a España	—	—	—	—	—	DNF	—	—	—
