= Cédric Vasseur =

French cyclist

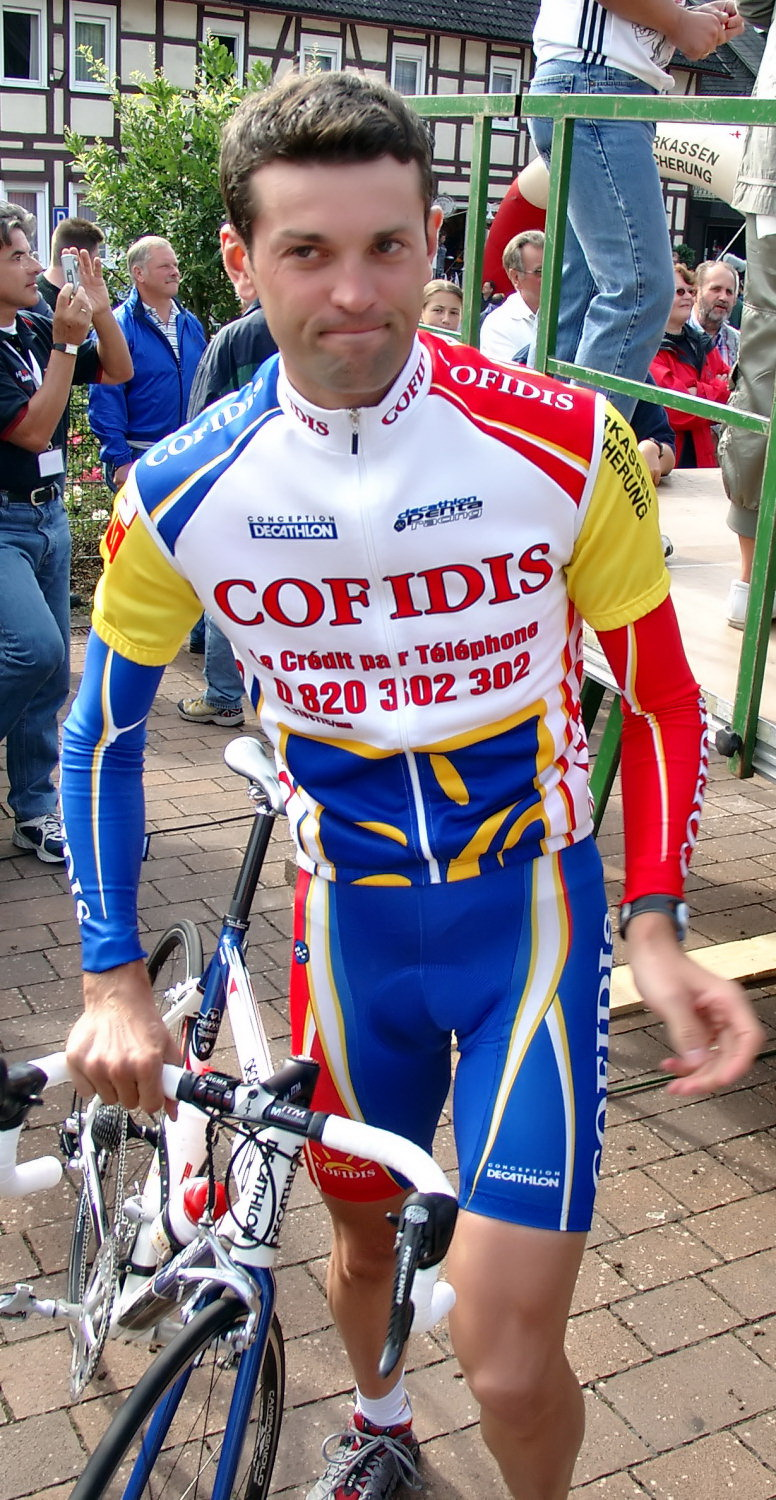
- Vasseur in 2003.

Personal information
- Full name: Cédric Vasseur
- Born: 18 August 1970 (age 56) Hazebrouck, France
- Height: 1.80 m (5 ft 11 in)
- Weight: 70 kg (154 lb; 11 st 0 lb)

Cycling career
- Sport: Cycling
- Current team: Cofidis
- Discipline: Road
- Role: Rider (retired); Team manager

Professional teams
- 1993–1994: Novemail–Histor–Laser Computer
- 1995–1999: GAN
- 2000–2001: U.S. Postal Service
- 2002–2005: Cofidis
- 2006–2007: Quick-Step–Innergetic

Managerial team
- 2018–: Cofidis

Major wins
- Grand Tour Tour de France 2 individual stages (1997, 2007)

Cédric Vasseur (born 18 August 1970) is a French former professional road racing cyclist, and former general manager of UCI WorldTeam Cofidis. As a rider, Vasseur competed between 1993 and 2007 for the Novemail–Histor, Crédit Agricole, U.S. Postal Service, Cofidis and Quick-Step–Innergetic squads. Vasseur was considered an all-rounder who could do well in a variety of races. He raced in all of the spring classics such as Tour of Flanders and Paris–Roubaix, and won a stage of the Dauphiné Libéré stage race as well as two at the Tour de France.

== Career ==
=== Professional rider ===
Born in Hazebrouck, Nord, Vasseur turned professional with the team Novemail in 1993, and switched to the GAN team in 1995 which then became Crédit Agricole in 1998. His first professional victory is also his most famous: it was his solo 147-kilometre breakaway by which he won stage 5 of the 1997 Tour de France. He then wore the yellow jersey as the race leader for five days.

In the 2000 and 2001 seasons, he rode for the U.S. Postal Service team and participated in the 2000 Tour de France. However, his exclusion from the 2001 Tour de France team led to his switch to the Cofidis team. He cited personal differences with the USPS team star Lance Armstrong, which was widely quoted in French cycling publications. In the wake of the publication of the USADA memo that proves Lance Armstrong doping practices, he explained that he was excluded because of his refusal to participate in Armstrong's doping program. ("Inutile de rappeler que je n'ai rien à voir dans cette organisation à qui je dois fort probablement ma non-participation au Tour 2001 ainsi que mon éviction de l'équipe.")

In 2004, Vasseur was arrested in suspicion of doping offences along with several other Cofidis riders, notably including then individual time trial champion David Millar. A counter-analysis later proved negative and Vasseur's name was then cleared. Vasseur also claimed some of the evidence in his witness statement had been forged. However, Vasseur was barred from riding in the 2004 Tour de France since the investigation had not concluded by the time that the race had started. He retired at the end of 2007 after taking a second Tour de France stage win that year.

=== After retirement ===
Following his retirement from racing, Vasseur served as head of the CPA (the professional cyclists' association), and as a TV pundit. In October 2017 the Cofidis team announced that Vasseur would return to the team as their new manager.

In September 2025 Cofidis announced that Vasseur had been let go as the team's manager.

== Personal life ==
Vasseur came from a family of cyclists: his father Alain Vasseur competed in the 1970, 1971 and 1974 editions of the Tour de France. His father also won a stage of the Tour de France after a solo breakaway.

== Major results ==
1993
1st Stage 6 Tour de l'Avenir
1994
2nd Grand Prix de la Ville de Lillers
8th GP Ouest-France
10th Overall Tour du Limousin
1995
6th Paris–Camembert
7th Overall Regio-Tour
10th Overall Tour de l'Oise
1996
1st Stage 4 Grand Prix du Midi Libre
8th Paris–Bourges
10th Overall Four Days of Dunkirk
1997
Tour de France

1st Stage 5
Held Stages 5–9

2nd Grand Prix de la Ville de Lillers
3rd Polynormande
6th Chrono des Herbiers
7th Overall Grand Prix du Midi Libre
7th Giro del Piemonte
8th GP Ouest-France
1998
6th Overall Route du Sud
6th Paris–Camembert
1999
3rd Road race, National Road Championships
7th Overall Circuit Cycliste Sarthe

1st Stage 1

7th Grand Prix d'Isbergues
8th Overall Grand Prix du Midi Libre
8th Trophée des Grimpeurs
2001
4th Overall Four Days of Dunkirk
10th Paris–Camembert
2002
1st Grand Prix d'Isbergues
5th Road race, National Road Championships
6th Overall Four Days of Dunkirk

1st Stage 5

6th Paris–Bourges
6th Boucles de l'Aulne
8th Giro del Piemonte
2003
1st Overall Paris–Corrèze

1st Stage 2

1st Overall Hessen-Rundfahrt

1st Stage 1

1st Stage 7 Critérium du Dauphiné Libéré
1st Stage 2 Tour du Limousin
4th Grand Prix Pino Cerami
4th Route Adélie
5th GP Chiasso
6th Giro di Lombardia
6th Grand Prix de Wallonie
8th A Travers le Morbihan
2004
1st Stage 4 Tour de l'Ain
1st Stage 4 Tour du Limousin
3rd GP Chiasso
4th Paris–Bourges
8th GP Ouest-France
9th Milano–Torino
2005
3rd Tour du Haut Var
5th Sparkassen Giro Bochum
6th Overall Étoile de Bessèges
9th Grand Prix d'Isbergues
2006
1st Grand Prix d'Isbergues
2007
1st Stage 10 Tour de France
2nd Grand Prix de Wallonie

=== Grand Tour general classification results timeline ===
Grand Tour	1995	1996	1997	1998	1999	2000	2001	2002	2003	2004	2005	2006	2007
Giro d'Italia	—	—	—	—	—	—	—	—	—	—	54	—	—
Tour de France	—	69	40	24	83	52	—	55	97	—	44	95	55
Vuelta a España	69	—	45	DNF	—	—	—	—	—	36	—	—	—

Legend
DSQ	Disqualified
DNF	Did not finish
