= Mario Traversoni =

Italian cyclist

Personal information
- Full name: Mario Traversoni
- Born: 12 April 1972 (age 54) Codogno, Italy
- Height: 1.79 m (5 ft 10 1/2 in)
- Weight: 70 kg (154 lb; 11 st 0 lb)

Cycling career
- Sport: Cycling
- Discipline: Road
- Role: Rider

Professional teams
- 1994–1996: Carrera Jeans-Tassoni
- 1997–1998: Mercatone Uno
- 1999: Saeco
- 2000: Jazztel Costa de Almeria
- 2001: LA-Pecol
- 2002: Mobilvetta Design-Formaggi Trentini

Major wins
- Tour de France, 1 stage

Mario Traversoni (born 12 April 1972 in Codogno, Province of Lodi) is an Italian former professional road bicycle racer.

In Stage 19 of the 1997 Tour de France, Traversoni finished third, 26 seconds behind Bart Voskamp and Jens Heppner. However, both Voskamp and Heppner were disqualified for bumping shoulders some 50 yards from the finish. A surprised Traversoni was thus classified as the winner of the stage, which would be his only stage win in the Tour de France.

== Major results ==
1994
4th GP de Fourmies
1996
2nd Road race, National Road Championships
1997
1st Stage 19 Tour de France
1st Stage 7 Tirreno-Adriatico
1st Stage 5a Setmana Catalana de Ciclisme
9th Scheldeprijs
1998
1st Clásica de Almería
1st Stage 2 Vuelta a Murcia
1999
2nd G.P. Costa degli Etruschi
4th First Union Classic
2001
1st Stage 5 GP Sport Noticias
