= 1998 Tour de France, Stage 12 to Stage 21 =

Stages of cycle race

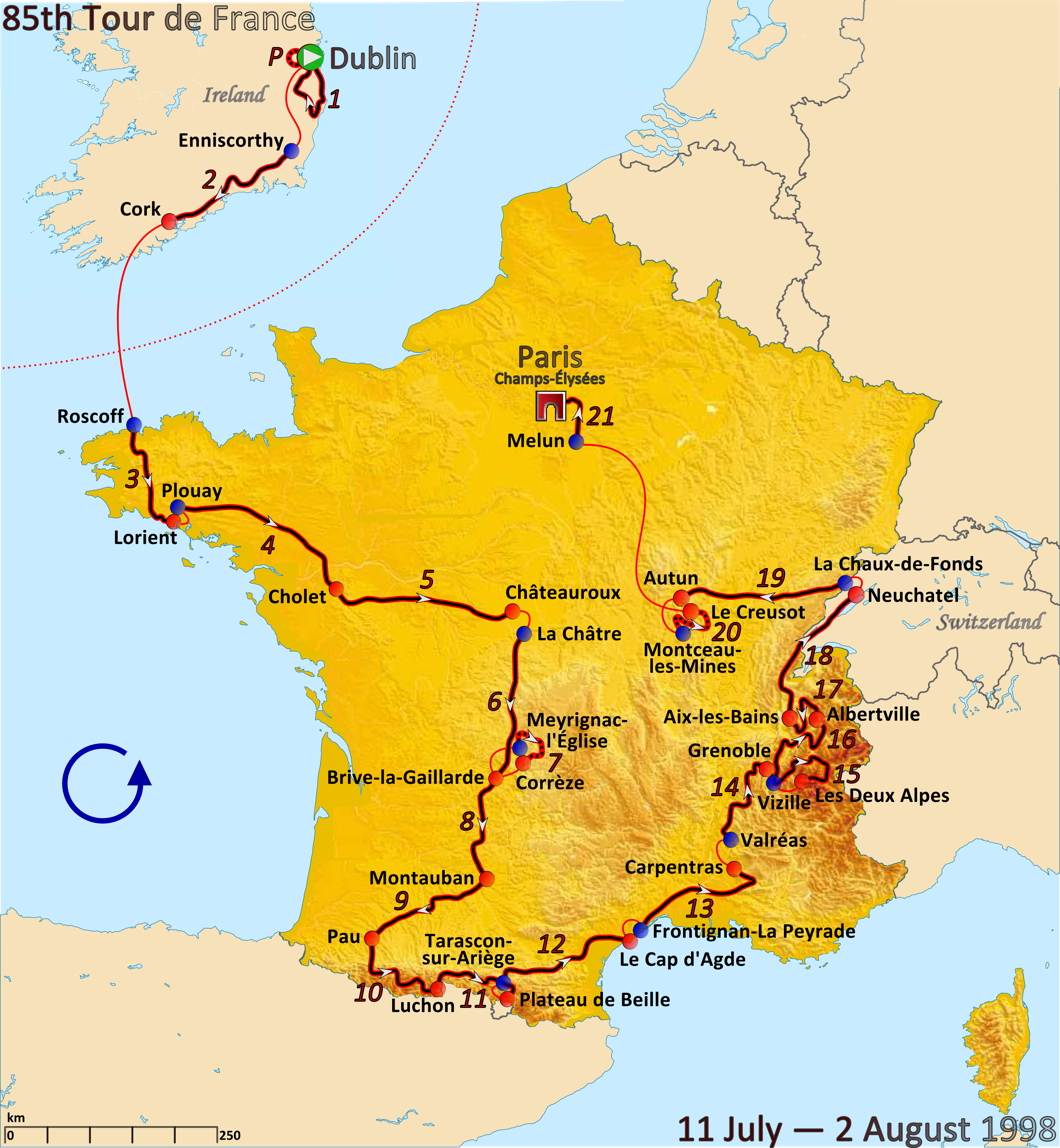
Route of the 1998 Tour de France

The 1998 Tour de France was the 85th edition of Tour de France, one of cycling's Grand Tours. The Tour began in Dublin, Ireland with a prologue individual time trial on 11 July and Stage 12 occurred on 24 July with a flat stage from Tarascon-sur-Ariège. The race finished on the Champs-Élysées in Paris on 2 August.

== Stage 12 ==
24 July 1998 — Tarascon-sur-Ariège to Le Cap d'Agde, 206 km (128.0 mi)

After the rest day, the Tour came out of the Pyrenees. The Tour was in uproar. The riders staged a strike over the increased attention given to the drugs scandal. The riders initially refused to ride but then started under neutral conditions. Dutch radio said that the peloton initially rode very slowly indeed for 14 km behind Leblanc's lead car. The neutral conditions were being maintained. After 16 km of neutral riding and a delay of 2 hours, the Tour officially resumed at around 13.35 European time. Tom Steels took his second sprint victory in the 1998 Tour when he won the mass sprint into Le Cap d'Agde, narrowly beating François Simon and Stéphane Barthe.

Stage 12 result

Rank	Cyclist	Team	Time
1	Tom Steels (BEL)	Mapei	4h 12' 51"
2	François Simon (FRA)	GAN	s.t.
3	Stéphane Barthe (FRA)	Casino	s.t.
4	Nicola Minali (ITA)	Riso Scotti	s.t.
5	Erik Zabel (GER)	Team Telekom	s.t.
6	Stuart O'Grady (AUS)	GAN	s.t.
7	Andrea Ferrigato (ITA)	Vitalicio Seguros	s.t.
8	Aart Vierhouten (NED)	Rabobank	s.t.
9	Leonardo Guidi (ITA)	Polti	s.t.
10	George Hincapie (USA)	US Postal	s.t.

General classification after stage 12

Rank	Cyclist	Team	Time
1	Jan Ullrich (GER)	Team Telekom	56h 55' 16"
2	Bobby Julich (USA)	Cofidis	+ 1' 11"
3	Laurent Jalabert (FRA)	ONCE	+ 3' 01"
4	Marco Pantani (ITA)	Mercatone Uno	s.t.
5	Michael Boogerd (NED)	Rabobank	+ 3' 29"
6	Luc Leblanc (FRA)	Polti	+ 4' 16"
7	Bo Hamburger (DEN)	Casino	+ 4' 44"
8	Fernando Escartín (ESP)	Kelme	+ 5' 16"
9	Roland Meier (SUI)	Cofidis	+ 5' 18"
10	Ángel Casero (ESP)	Vitalicio Seguros	+ 5' 53"

== Stage 13 ==
25 July 1998 — Frontignan la Peyrade to Carpentras, 196 km (121.8 mi)

Stage 13 result

Rank	Cyclist	Team	Time
1	Daniele Nardello (ITA)	Mapei–Bricobi	4h 32' 46"
2	José Vicente García (ESP)	Banesto	s.t.
3	Andrea Tafi (ITA)	Mapei–Bricobi	s.t.
4	Stéphane Heulot (FRA)	Française des Jeux	s.t.
5	Marty Jemison (USA)	U.S. Postal Service	s.t.
6	Koos Moerenhout (NED)	Rabobank	s.t.
7	Sergei Ivanov (RUS)	TVM–Farm Frites	+ 2' 27"
8	Fabio Roscioli (ITA)	Asics–CGA	+ 2' 43"
9	François Simon (FRA)	GAN	+ 2' 43"
10	Maarten den Bakker (NED)	Rabobank	+ 2' 43"

General classification after stage 13

Rank	Cyclist	Team	Time
1	Jan Ullrich (GER)	Team Telekom	61h 30' 53"
2	Bobby Julich (USA)	Cofidis	+ 1' 11"
3	Laurent Jalabert (FRA)	ONCE	+ 3' 01"
4	Marco Pantani (ITA)	Mercatone Uno–Bianchi	s.t.
5	Michael Boogerd (NED)	Rabobank	+ 3' 29"
6	Luc Leblanc (FRA)	Team Polti	+ 4' 16"
7	Bo Hamburger (DEN)	Casino–Ag2r	+ 4' 44"
8	Stéphane Heulot (FRA)	Française des Jeux	+ 5' 16"
9	Fernando Escartín (ESP)	Kelme–Costa Blanca	+ 5' 16"
10	Roland Meier (SUI)	Cofidis	+ 5' 18"

== Stage 14 ==
26 July 1998 — Valréas to Grenoble, 186.5 km (115.9 mi)

Stage 14 result

Rank	Cyclist	Team	Time
1	Stuart O'Grady (AUS)	GAN	4:30:53"
2	Orlando Rodrigues (POR)	Banesto	s.t.
3	Léon van Bon (NED)	Rabobank	s.t.
4	Peter Meinert Nielsen (DEN)	U.S. Postal Service	s.t.
5	Laurent Desbiens (FRA)	Cofidis	s.t.
6	Giuseppe Calcaterra (ITA)	Saeco–Cannondale	s.t.
7	Frédéric Guesdon (FRA)	Française des Jeux	+ 8' 27"
8	Rafael Díaz Justo (ESP)	ONCE	s.t.
9	Erik Zabel (GER)	Team Telekom	+ 10' 05"
10	Ján Svorada (CZE)	Mapei–Bricobi	s.t.

General classification after stage 14

Rank	Cyclist	Team	Time
1	Jan Ullrich (GER)	Team Telekom	66:11:51"
2	Bobby Julich (USA)	Cofidis	+ 1' 11"
3	Laurent Jalabert (FRA)	ONCE	+ 3' 01"
4	Marco Pantani (ITA)	Mercatone Uno–Bianchi	s.t.
5	Michael Boogerd (NED)	Rabobank	+ 3' 29"
6	Luc Leblanc (FRA)	Team Polti	+ 4' 16"
7	Bo Hamburger (DEN)	Casino–Ag2r	+ 4' 44"
8	Stéphane Heulot (FRA)	Française des Jeux	+ 5' 05"
9	Fernando Escartín (ESP)	Kelme–Costa Blanca	+ 5' 16"
10	Roland Meier (SUI)	Cofidis	+ 5' 18"

== Stage 15 ==
27 July 1998 — Grenoble to Les Deux Alpes, 189 km (117.4 mi)

Stage 15 result

Rank	Rider	Team	Time
1	Marco Pantani (ITA)	Mercatone Uno–Bianchi	5:43:45"
2	Rodolfo Massi (ITA)	Casino–Ag2r	+ 1' 54"
3	Fernando Escartín (ESP)	Kelme–Costa Blanca	+ 1' 59"
4	Christophe Rinero (FRA)	Cofidis	+ 2' 57"
5	Bobby Julich (USA)	Cofidis	+ 5' 43"
6	Michael Boogerd (NED)	Rabobank	+ 5' 48"
7	Marcos-Antonio Serrano (ESP)	Kelme–Costa Blanca	+ 6' 04"
8	Jean-Cyril Robin (FRA)	U.S. Postal Service	+ 6' 34"
9	Manuel Beltrán (ESP)	Banesto	+ 6' 40"
10	Dariusz Baranowski (POL)	U.S. Postal Service	s.t.

General classification after stage 15

Rank	Cyclist	Team	Time
1	Marco Pantani (ITA)	Mercatone Uno–Bianchi	71:58:37"
2	Bobby Julich (USA)	Cofidis	+ 3' 53"
3	Fernando Escartín (ESP)	Kelme–Costa Blanca	+ 4' 14"
4	Jan Ullrich (GER)	Team Telekom	+ 5' 56"
5	Christophe Rinero (FRA)	Cofidis	+ 6' 12"
6	Michael Boogerd (NED)	Rabobank	+ 6' 16"
7	Rodolfo Massi (ITA)	Casino–Ag2r	+ 7' 53"
8	Luc Leblanc (FRA)	Team Polti	+ 8' 01"
9	Roland Meier (SUI)	Cofidis	+ 8' 57"
10	Daniele Nardello (ITA)	Mapei–Bricobi	+ 9' 14"

== Stage 16 ==
28 July 1998 — Vizille to Albertville, 204 km (126.8 mi)

Stage 16 result

Rank	Rider	Team	Time
1	Jan Ullrich (GER)	Team Telekom	5h 39' 47"
2	Marco Pantani (ITA)	Mercatone Uno–Bianchi	s.t.
3	Bobby Julich (USA)	Cofidis	+ 1' 49"
4	Fernando Escartín (ESP)	Kelme–Costa Blanca	s.t.
5	Axel Merckx (BEL)	Team Polti	s.t.
6	Michael Boogerd (NED)	Rabobank	s.t.
7	Bjarne Riis (DEN)	Team Telekom	s.t.
8	Leonardo Piepoli (ITA)	Saeco–Cannondale	s.t.
9	Stéphane Heulot (FRA)	Française des Jeux	s.t.
10	Jean-Cyril Robin (FRA)	U.S. Postal Service	s.t.

General classification after stage 16

Rank	Rider	Team	Time
1	Marco Pantani (ITA)	Mercatone Uno–Bianchi	77h 38' 24"
2	Bobby Julich (USA)	Cofidis	+ 5' 42"
3	Jan Ullrich (GER)	Team Telekom	+ 5' 56"
4	Fernando Escartín (ESP)	Kelme–Costa Blanca	+ 6' 03"
5	Christophe Rinero (FRA)	Cofidis	+ 8' 01"
6	Michael Boogerd (NED)	Rabobank	+ 8' 05"
7	Rodolfo Massi (ITA)	Casino–Ag2r	+ 12' 15"
8	Jean-Cyril Robin (FRA)	U.S. Postal Service	+ 12' 34"
9	Leonardo Piepoli (ITA)	Saeco–Cannondale	+ 12' 45"
10	Roland Meier (SUI)	Cofidis	+ 13' 19"

== Stage 17 ==
29 July 1998 — Albertville to Aix-les-Bains, 149 km (92.6 mi)

The stage was neutralised due to a protest by the riders.

== Stage 18 ==
30 July 1998 — Aix-les-Bains to Neuchâtel (Switzerland), 218.5 km (135.8 mi)

Stage 18 result

Rank	Rider	Team	Time
1	Tom Steels (BEL)	Mapei–Bricobi	4h 53' 27"
2	Erik Zabel (GER)	Team Telekom	s.t.
3	Stuart O'Grady (AUS)	GAN	s.t.
4	Robbie McEwen (AUS)	Rabobank	s.t.
5	Jacky Durand (FRA)	Casino–Ag2r	s.t.
6	Léon van Bon (NED)	Rabobank	s.t.
7	François Simon (FRA)	GAN	s.t.
8	Nicolas Jalabert (FRA)	Cofidis	s.t.
9	Aart Vierhouten (NED)	Rabobank	s.t.
10	Viatcheslav Djavanian (RUS)	BigMat–Auber 93	s.t.

General classification after stage 18

Rank	Rider	Team	Time
1	Marco Pantani (ITA)	Mercatone Uno–Bianchi	82h 31' 51"
2	Bobby Julich (USA)	Cofidis	+ 5' 42"
3	Jan Ullrich (GER)	Team Telekom	+ 5' 56"
4	Christophe Rinero (FRA)	Cofidis	+ 8' 01"
5	Michael Boogerd (NED)	Rabobank	+ 8' 05"
6	Jean-Cyril Robin (FRA)	U.S. Postal Service	+ 12' 34"
7	Roland Meier (SUI)	Cofidis	+ 13' 19"
8	Daniele Nardello (ITA)	Mapei–Bricobi	+ 13' 36"
9	Bjarne Riis (DEN)	Team Telekom	+ 14' 45"
10	Giuseppe Di Grande (ITA)	Mapei–Bricobi	+ 15' 13"

== Stage 19 ==
31 July 1998 — La Chaux-de-Fonds (Switzerland) to Autun, 242 km (150.4 mi)

Stage 19 result

Rank	Rider	Team	Time
1	Magnus Bäckstedt (SWE)	GAN	5h 10' 14"
2	Maarten den Bakker (NED)	Rabobank	s.t.
3	Eddy Mazzoleni (ITA)	Saeco–Cannondale	s.t.
4	Pascal Deramé (FRA)	U.S. Postal Service	s.t.
5	Frédéric Guesdon (FRA)	Française des Jeux	+ 25"
6	Fabio Sacchi (ITA)	Team Polti	s.t.
7	Jacky Durand (FRA)	Casino–Ag2r	s.t.
8	Alain Turicchia (ITA)	Asics–CGA	s.t.
9	Stuart O'Grady (AUS)	GAN	s.t.
10	Thierry Gouvenou (FRA)	BigMat–Auber 93	s.t.

General classification after stage 19

Rank	Rider	Team	Time
1	Marco Pantani (ITA)	Mercatone Uno–Bianchi	87h 58' 43"
2	Bobby Julich (USA)	Cofidis	+ 5' 42"
3	Jan Ullrich (GER)	Team Telekom	+ 5' 56"
4	Christophe Rinero (FRA)	Cofidis	+ 8' 01"
5	Michael Boogerd (NED)	Rabobank	+ 8' 05"
6	Jean-Cyril Robin (FRA)	U.S. Postal Service	+ 12' 34"
7	Roland Meier (SUI)	Cofidis	+ 13' 19"
8	Daniele Nardello (ITA)	Mapei–Bricobi	+ 13' 36"
9	Bjarne Riis (DEN)	Team Telekom	+ 14' 45"
10	Giuseppe Di Grande (ITA)	Mapei–Bricobi	+ 15' 13"

== Stage 20 ==
1 August 1998 — Montceau-les-Mines to Le Creusot, 52 km (32.3 mi) (individual time trial)

Stage 20 result

Rank	Cyclist	Team	Time
1	Jan Ullrich (GER)	Team Telekom	1h 3' 52"
2	Bobby Julich (USA)	Cofidis	+ 1' 01"
3	Marco Pantani (ITA)	Mercatone Uno–Bianchi	+ 2' 35"
4	Dariusz Baranowski (POL)	U.S. Postal Service	+ 3' 11"
5	Andrey Teteryuk (KAZ)	Lotto–Mobistar	+ 3' 46"
6	Viatcheslav Ekimov (RUS)	U.S. Postal Service	+ 3' 48"
7	Christophe Rinero (FRA)	Cofidis	+ 3' 50"
8	Riccardo Forconi (ITA)	Saeco–Cannondale	+ 3' 55"
9	Axel Merckx (BEL)	Team Polti	+ 3' 59"
10	Roland Meier (SUI)	Cofidis	+ 4' 29"

General classification after stage 20

Rank	Cyclist	Team	Time
1	Marco Pantani (ITA)	Mercatone Uno–Bianchi	89h 5' 10"
2	Jan Ullrich (GER)	Team Telekom	+ 3' 21"
3	Bobby Julich (USA)	Cofidis	+ 4' 08"
4	Christophe Rinero (FRA)	Cofidis	+ 9' 16"
5	Michael Boogerd (NED)	Rabobank	+ 11' 26"
6	Jean-Cyril Robin (FRA)	U.S. Postal Service	+ 14' 57"
7	Roland Meier (SUI)	Cofidis	+ 15' 13"
8	Daniele Nardello (ITA)	Mapei–Bricobi	+ 16' 07"
9	Giuseppe Di Grande (ITA)	Mapei–Bricobi	+ 17' 35"
10	Axel Merckx (BEL)	Team Polti	+ 17' 39"

== Stage 21 ==
2 August 1998 — Melun to Paris Champs-Élysées, 147.5 km (91.7 mi)

Stage 21 result

Rank	Cyclist	Team	Time
1	Tom Steels (BEL)	Mapei–Bricobi	3h 44' 36"
2	Stefano Zanini (ITA)	Mapei–Bricobi	s.t.
3	Stuart O'Grady (AUS)	GAN	s.t.
4	George Hincapie (USA)	U.S. Postal Service	s.t.
5	Erik Zabel (GER)	Team Telekom	s.t.
6	Robbie McEwen (AUS)	Rabobank	s.t.
7	Mario Traversoni (ITA)	Mercatone Uno–Bianchi	s.t.
8	François Simon (FRA)	GAN	s.t.
9	Damien Nazon (FRA)	Française des Jeux	s.t.
10	Alain Turicchia (ITA)	Asics–CGA	s.t.

General classification after stage 21

Rank	Cyclist	Team	Time
1	Marco Pantani (ITA)	Mercatone Uno–Bianchi	92h 49' 46"
2	Jan Ullrich (GER)	Team Telekom	+ 3' 21"
3	Bobby Julich (USA)	Cofidis	+ 4' 08"
4	Christophe Rinero (FRA)	Cofidis	+ 9' 16"
5	Michael Boogerd (NED)	Rabobank	+ 11' 26"
6	Jean-Cyril Robin (FRA)	U.S. Postal Service	+ 14' 57"
7	Roland Meier (SUI)	Cofidis	+ 15' 13"
8	Daniele Nardello (ITA)	Mapei–Bricobi	+ 16' 07"
9	Giuseppe Di Grande (ITA)	Mapei–Bricobi	+ 17' 35"
10	Axel Merckx (BEL)	Team Polti	+ 17' 39"
