= Turicchia =

Turicchia is an Italian surname. Notable people with the surname include:

- Alain Turicchia (born 1975), Italian cyclist
- Riccardo Turicchia (born 2003), Italian footballer
