= 1996 Vuelta a Murcia =

Race details
- Dates: 6–10 March 1996
- Stages: 5
- Distance: 752.3 km (467.5 mi)
- Winning time: 19h 50' 43"

Results
	Winner	Melcior Mauri (ESP)
	Second	Wladimir Belli (ITA)
	Third	Rodolfo Massi (ITA)

The 1996 Vuelta a Murcia was the 12th edition of the Vuelta a Murcia cycle race and was held on 6 March to 10 March 1996. The race started and finished in Murcia. The race was won by Melcior Mauri.

== General classification ==
Final general classification

Rank	Rider	Time
1	Melcior Mauri (ESP)	19h 50' 43"
2	Wladimir Belli (ITA)	+ 27"
3	Rodolfo Massi (ITA)	+ 1' 01"
4	Neil Stephens (AUS)	+ 1' 01"
5	Santos González (ESP)	+ 2' 00"
6	Viatcheslav Ekimov (RUS)	+ 2' 12"
7	Danny Nelissen (NED)	+ 2' 38"
8	Servais Knaven (NED)	+ 2' 50"
9	Asiat Saitov (RUS)	+ 2' 54"
10	Marco Serpellini (ITA)	+ 3' 13"
