= Kevin Livingston =

American cyclist

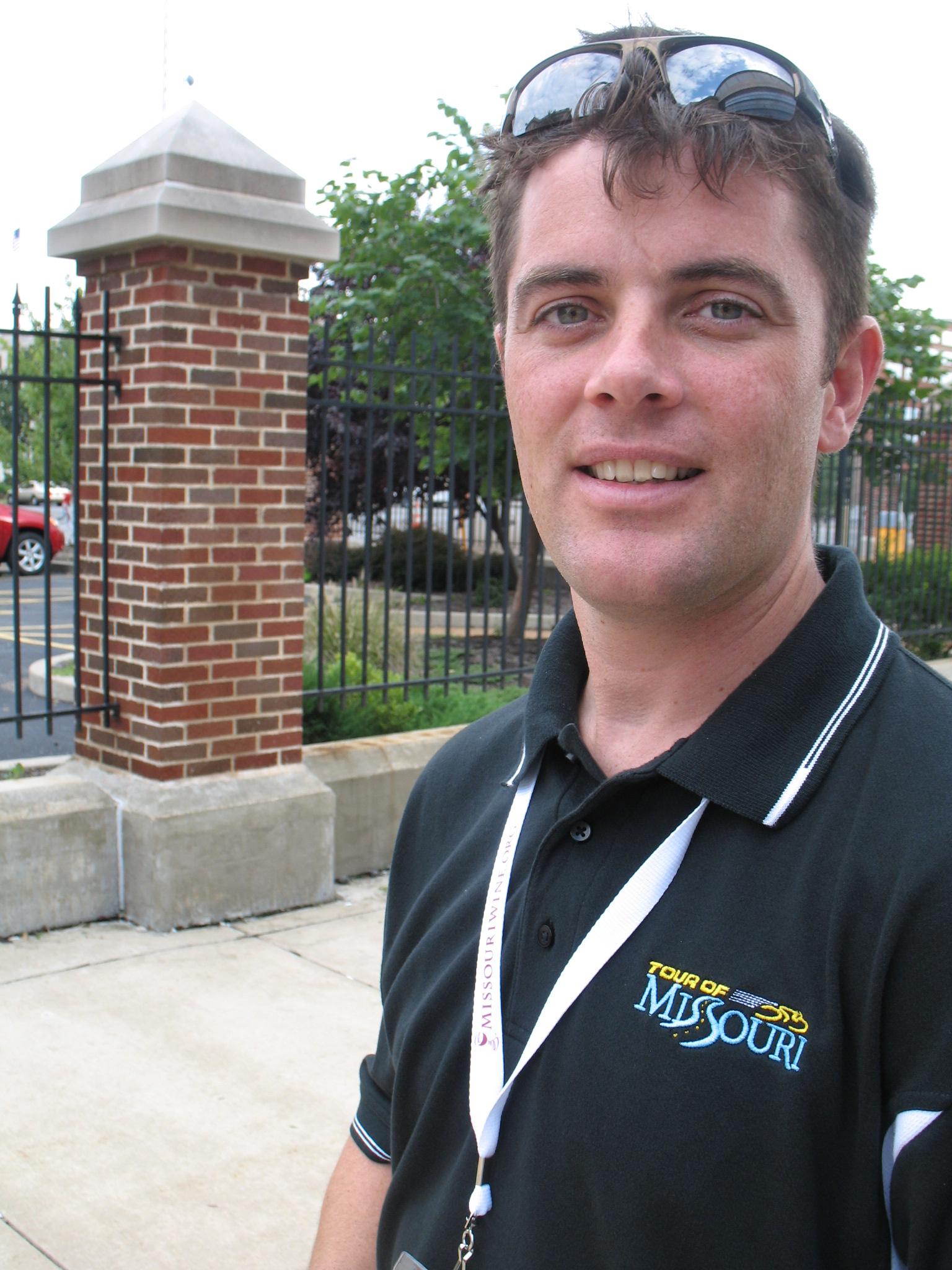
- Livingston in 2008

Personal information
- Born: May 24, 1973 (age 53) St. Louis, Missouri, U.S.
- Height: 6 ft 0 in (1.83 m)
- Weight: 154 lb (70 kg)

Cycling career
- Sport: Cycling
- Current team: Retired
- Discipline: Road
- Role: Rider

Professional teams
- 1995–1996: Motorola
- 1997–1998: Cofidis
- 1999–2000: US Postal
- 2001–2002: Team Telekom

Kevin Livingston (born May 24, 1973 in St. Louis, Missouri) is an American former professional cyclist.

== Career ==
Livingston rode six Tours de France, the Giro d'Italia and many of the European Classics, during a career with Motorola, Cofidis, US Postal Service and Team Telekom. He was one of Lance Armstrong's domestiques in the Tour de France and other races. His best result in the Tour de France was 17th overall, in 1998. He retired in 2002 and lives in Austin, Texas.

== Doping ==
Livingston's name was on the list of doping tests published by the French Senate on July 24, 2013 that were collected during the 1998 Tour de France and found positive for EPO when re-tested in 2004.

== Athletic performances ==
Livingston had 4% body fat, was able to reach a maximum heart rate of 195 bpm, and had an anaerobic threshold power of 558 Watts or 8.09 watt/kg.

== Post-racing career ==
Following retirement from racing, Livingston became a spokesperson and supporter of the National Diabetes Tour de Cure. He also acts as a consultant to Medalist Sports, where he has served as Competition Director for the Amgen Tour of California and the Tour of Missouri. He set up the PedalHard Training Center, with locations in Austin Texas and St. Louis Missouri, and Fort Worth, TX which provides training and testing facilities.

== Major results ==
1992
1st Overall Tour of the Gila
1994
1st Amateur Road race, National Road Championships
1st Stage 5 Tour of Austria
1996
1st Stage 3 Tour of Galicia
8th Giro del Veneto
1997
Tour de l'Ain

1st Stages 4 & 5a

2nd Overall Tour de l'Avenir
1998
10th Overall À travers Lausanne
1999
6th Overall Critérium du Dauphiné Libéré
8th Breitling Grand Prix (with Lance Armstrong)
2000
9th Overall Vuelta a Burgos
2002
7th Breitling Grand Prix (with Bobby Julich)

=== Grand Tour general classification results timeline ===
Grand Tour	1995	1996	1997	1998	1999	2000	2001	2002
Giro d'Italia	—	—	—	—	—	—	114	—
Tour de France	—	—	38	17	36	38	43	56
/ Vuelta a España	106	61	—	—	—	—	—	—

Legend
—	Did not compete
DNF	Did not finish
