= Schynberg Rundfahrt =

Race details
- Date: May
- Region: Switzerland

History
- First edition: 1982
- Editions: 22
- Final edition: 2003
- First winner: Kurt Ehrensperger (SUI)
- Final winner: Renzo Mazzoleni (ITA)

The Schynberg Rundfahrt was a one-day road cycling race held annually in Switzerland between 1982 and 2003. Until 1990, it was a junior race, before switching to amateur, and in 1997 was opened to professionals. It served as the Swiss junior road race championship in 1990, the amateur championship in 1993, and the elite championship in 1997 and 1998.

== Winners ==
- 2003 : (Italy) Renzo Mazzoleni
- 2002 : (Norway) Kurt Asle Arvesen
- 2001 : (Germany) Ronny Scholz
- 2000 : (Belgium) Dave Bruylandts
- 1999 : (Italy) Alessandro Bertolini
- 1998 : (Switzerland) Niki Aebersold
- 1997 : (Switzerland) Oskar Camenzind
- 1996 : (Switzerland) Roland Meier
- 1995 : (Switzerland) Philipp Buschor
- 1994 : (Australia) Scott Sunderland
- 1993 : (Switzerland) Roland Meier
- 1992 : (Switzerland) Beat Zberg
- 1991 : (Germany) Rolf Aldag
- 1990 : (Switzerland) Guido Wirz
- 1989 : (Italy) Sandro Vitali
- 1988 : (Portugal) Acácio da Silva
- 1987 : (Switzerland) Daniel Huwyler
- 1986 : (Switzerland) Fabian Fuchs
- 1985 : (Switzerland) Arno Küttel
- 1984 : (Switzerland) Beat Schumacher
- 1983 : (Switzerland) Richard Trinkler
- 1982 : (Switzerland) Kurt Ehrensperger
