= Arno Küttel =

Swiss bicycle racer

Personal information
- Born: 20 December 1963 (age 62) Bremgarten, Aargau, Switzerland

Cycling career
- Sport: Cycling
- Current team: Retired
- Disciplines: Road; Track
- Role: Rider

Professional teams
- 1986–1988: Sammontana–Bianchi
- 1989–1990: Domex–Weinmann
- 1991–1992: Mosimann–Velosport
- 1993–1994: Winkler
- 1995–1996: Bianchi–Mosimann
Medal record
Representing Switzerland
UCI Motor-paced World Championships
Bronze medal – third place	1991 Stuttgart	Professionals

Arno Küttel (born 20 December 1963) is a Swiss former professional racing cyclist. He notably won a stage of the 1989 Tour de Suisse and the 1995 European Motor-paced Championships. He also won the bronze medal at the 1991 UCI Motor-paced World Championships.

== Major results ==
1982
1st Chur–Arosa
1983
2nd Chur–Arosa
1984
2nd Chur–Arosa
1985
1st Road race, National Amateur Road Championships
1st Schynberg Rundfahrt
3rd Giro del Lago Maggiore
3rd Chur–Arosa
1986
1st Chur–Arosa
3rd Overall GP Tell
3rd Schynberg Rundfahrt
1987
2nd Chur–Arosa
4th Tre Valli Varesine
5th Gran Premio Città di Camaiore
6th Coppa Placci
1988
1st Overall Grabs–Voralp

1st Stage 1a

1st Visp–Grächen
1989
1st Stage 4 Tour de Suisse
1st Chur–Arosa
6th Tour du Nord-Ouest
1990
3rd Time trial, National Road Championships
1991
3rd UCI Motor-paced World Championships
1993
1st National Motor-paced Championships
1995
1st European Motor-paced Championships
