= Rodolfo Massi =

Italian cyclist (born 1965)

Personal information
- Full name: Rodolfo Massi
- Nickname: Il Farmacista (The Pharmacist)
- Born: 17 September 1965 (age 61) Corinaldo, Italy

Cycling career
- Sport: Cycling
- Discipline: Road
- Role: Rider

Professional teams
- 1987: Magniflex
- 1988: Alba Cucine-Benotto
- 1989: Atala–Campagnolo
- 1990–1991: Ariostea
- 1992: Jolly Componibili-Club 88
- 1993–1994: Amore & Vita–Galatron
- 1995–1996: Refin
- 1997–1998: Casino
- 1999: Liquigas
- 2000: Cantina Tollo–Regain
- 2001: Mobilvetta Design-Formaggi Trentini
- 2002: Amore & Vita–Beretta
- 2003: Colombia–Selle Italia

Major wins
- Grand Tours Tour de France 1 individual stage (1998) Giro d'Italia 1 individual stage (1996)

Rodolfo Massi (Italian pronunciation: [roˈdɔlfo ˈmassi]; born 17 September 1965) is an Italian former professional road bicycle racer. He won a stage in 1996 Giro d'Italia and 1998 Tour de France, but was expelled from the 1998 Tour de France after illegal doping was found in his hotel room. In the 1990 Tour de France, Massi was the Lanterne rouge.

== Biography ==
As an amateur, Massi won many races, and when he became a professional cyclist in 1987, much was expected from him. In 1988, he broke a leg, and after the operation, one of his legs was a few centimeters shorter than the other. Massi often complained that he was not able to cycle in a regular way, and became a domestique for many different teams.

In 1998, he had his best year. He won the Tour Méditerranéen and the Giro di Calabria. In the Tour de France, he won a mountain stage, and after the 16th stage was in seventh place in the general classification, and leading the mountains classification, when corticoids were found in his hotel room. He was questioned by the police, and was not able to start the next stage. Massi was the first rider in history to be arrested for breaking doping laws. Later, all legal charges against him were dropped, but the Italian Olympic Committee banned him for six months.

== Major results ==
1987
9th Giro di Toscana
1988
2nd Trofeo Pantalica
7th Trofeo Laigueglia
1989
3rd Gran Premio Città di Camaiore
1990
5th Gran Premio Città di Camaiore
8th Trofeo Laigueglia
9th Giro dell'Appennino
1991
4th Trofeo Laigueglia
1992
7th Overall Giro del Trentino
1993
10th Giro di Toscana
1994
1st Overall Settimana Internazionale di Coppi e Bartali

1st Stage 1

5th Overall Tour de Suisse
8th Overall Tirreno–Adriatico
1995
3rd Giro del Friuli
6th GP Industria & Artigianato di Larciano
1996
1st Stage 10 Giro d'Italia
2nd Trofeo Laigueglia
3rd Overall Vuelta a Murcia
4th Giro dell'Appennino
6th Overall Tirreno–Adriatico
6th Overall Giro del Trentino

1st Stage 5

8th Trofeo Pantalica
10th Trofeo Melinda
1997
1st Tour du Haut Var
1st Stage 4 Volta a la Comunitat Valenciana
5th Overall Étoile de Bessèges
6th Trofeo Laigueglia
9th Grand Prix d'Ouverture La Marseillaise
10th Overall Tirreno–Adriatico
10th Overall Grand Prix du Midi Libre
10th Overall Tour Méditerranéen
1998
1st Overall Tour Méditerranéen
Tour de France

1st Stage 10
Held after Stages 10–17

1st Stage 2 Critérium International
3rd Liège–Bastogne–Liège
3rd Paris–Camembert
4th Tour du Haut Var
5th Overall Paris–Nice
6th Overall Tour of the Basque Country
7th Overall Setmana Catalana de Ciclisme
10th La Flèche Wallonne
2000
1st Stage 6 Grand Prix du Midi Libre
3rd Giro di Campania
8th Tre Valli Varesine
2001
8th Giro della Provincia di Siracusa
2002
7th Gran Premio di Chiasso
10th Overall Giro Riviera Ligure Ponente

=== Grand Tour general classification results timeline ===
Grand Tour	1987	1988	1989	1990	1991	1992	1993	1994	1995	1996	1997	1998	1999	2000	2001	2002	2003
/ Vuelta a España	—	36	—	—	—	—	—	56	—	—	20	DNF	DNF	34	—	—	—
Giro d'Italia	24	—	85	35	—	94	DNF	37	48	35	—	—	—	—	—	—	67
Tour de France	—	—	—	156	—	—	—	—	—	—	—	DNF	—	—	—	—	—

Legend
—	Did not compete
DNF	Did not finish

== See also ==
- List of doping cases in cycling
