= Roland Meier =

Swiss cyclist

Personal information
- Born: 22 November 1967 (age 58) Danikon, Switzerland

Cycling career
- Sport: Cycling
- Current team: Retired
- Discipline: Road
- Role: Rider

Amateur team
- 1993: TVM–Bison Kit (stagiaire)

Professional teams
- 1994–1995: TVM–Bison Kit
- 1996–1997: PMU Romand–Bepsa
- 1998–2000: Cofidis
- 2001: Team Coast

Roland Meier (born 22 November 1967) is a Swiss former cyclist. He competed in two events at the 1992 Summer Olympics. On 28 August 2001, he was suspended for eight months because he tested positive for EPO.

== Major results ==
1990
1st Stage 1 Ronde de l'Isard
3rd Overall Grand Prix Guillaume Tell
1991
3rd Overall Flèche du Sud
1992
2nd Overall Grand Prix Guillaume Tell
2nd Schynberg Rundfahrt
1993
1st Stausee Rundfahrt
1st Schynberg Rundfahrt
1st Stages 6 & 8 Tour of Austria
1st Stage 4 Tour du Vaucluse
2nd Time trial, National Road Championships
2nd GP Lugano
8th Milano–Torino
1995
1st Time trial, National Road Championships
10th Overall Route du Sud
1996
1st Schynberg Rundfahrt
8th Overall Tour de Normandie
1997
1st Stage 2 Grand Prix Guillaume Tell
3rd Overall Regio-Tour
5th Overall Tour de Suisse
1998
2nd Wartenberg Rundfahrt
3rd Time trial, National Road Championships
5th Overall Euskal Bizikleta
5th Overall Tour de Romandie
6th Overall Tour de Suisse
7th Overall Tour de France
8th Overall Circuit Cycliste Sarthe
1999
5th Classique des Alpes
7th Overall Euskal Bizikleta
2000
8th Overall Tour de Romandie

=== Grand Tour general classification results timeline ===
Grand Tour	1994	1995	1996	1997	1998	1999	2000
Giro d'Italia	—	DNF	—	—	—	—	—
Tour de France	—	—	—	—	7	15	44
Vuelta a España	99	108	—	—	—	DNF	—

Legend
DSQ	Disqualified
DNF	Did not finish
