= Christophe Rinero =

French cyclist

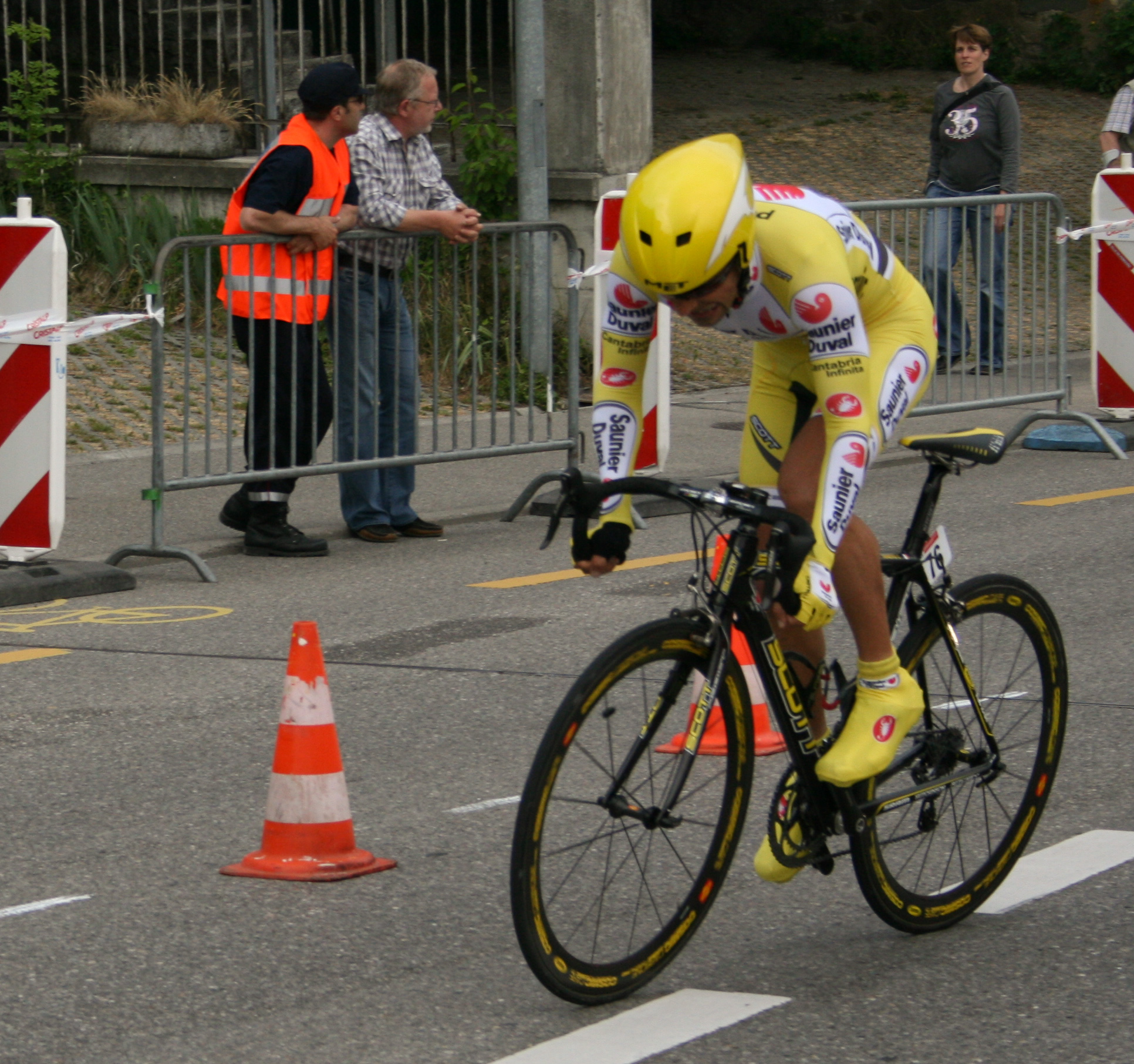

Personal information
- Full name: Christophe Rinero
- Born: 29 December 1973 (age 52) Moissac, France
- Height: 1.72 m (5 ft 8 in)
- Weight: 65 kg (143 lb)

Cycling career
- Sport: Cycling
- Discipline: Road
- Role: Rider

Professional teams
- 1996: Mutuelle de Seine-et-Marne
- 1997–2001: Cofidis
- 2002–2003: Saint-Quentin–Oktos
- 2004–2005: R.A.G.T. Semences–MG Rover
- 2006–2007: Saunier Duval–Prodir
- 2008: Agritubel

Major wins
- Grand Tours Tour de France Mountains classification (1998)

Christophe Rinero (born 29 December 1973 in Moissac) is a French former professional road racing cyclist. His sporting career began with CA Castelsarrazin. Rinero's greatest achievements have been to win the Tour de l'Avenir in 1998 and the King of the Mountains in the 1998 Tour de France. He retired at the end of 2008.

== Career ==
After riding for second and third division teams from 2002 to 2005 he returned to the UCI ProTour in 2006 to ride with Saunier Duval–Prodir. He renewed with Saunier Duval–Prodir for the 2007 season. Rinero went to the 2007 Tour de France as a domestique for Iban Mayo. He was the only French rider on their squad for the Tour. During stage 16 he was in the break of the day, he won the first intermediate sprint.

Rinero left Saunier Duval–Prodir after two seasons heading to Agritubel for his final year as a professional cyclist.

== Major results ==
1996
3rd Overall Tour de l'Ain

1st Stage 1

1998
1st Overall Tour de l'Avenir

1st Stages 7 & 9

1st Stage 1 Tour du Limousin
2nd Overall Grand Prix du Midi Libre

1st Stage 2

3rd Châteauroux Classic
4th Overall Tour de France

1st Mountains classification

6th GP Ouest–France
8th Route Adélie
2002
Tour du Limousin

1st Mountains classification
1st Stage 2

3rd Boucles de l'Aulne
8th Overall Tour de Picardie
2003
3rd Overall Tour de la Somme
5th Grand Prix de Wallonie
2004
8th Grand Prix de Wallonie
2005
2nd Overall Criterium des Espoirs
6th Grand Prix de Wallonie
7th GP de la Ville de Rennes
2008
10th Overall Rhône-Alpes Isère Tour
