= Pascal Deramé =

French cyclist

Personal information
- Born: 25 July 1970 (age 56) Nantes, France
- Height: 1.85 m (6 ft 1 in)
- Weight: 73 kg (161 lb; 11 st 7 lb)

Cycling career
- Sport: Cycling
- Current team: Retired
- Discipline: Road
- Role: Rider

Professional teams
- 1994-1996: Gan
- 1997-1999: US Postal Service
- 2000-2002: Bonjour

Pascal Dérame (born 25 July 1970) is a former French cyclist.

== Career achievements ==
=== Major results ===
1990
3rd Nantes-Segré
1991
2nd Circuit de Lorraine
1993
1st Bordeaux-Saintes
1994
1st Tour du Finistère
2nd Grand Prix Gilbert Bousquet
1996
1st stage 5 Tour du Poitou-Charentes
2002
1st Grand Prix de la Ville de Lillers

=== Grand Tour general classification results timeline ===
Grand Tour	1995	1996	1997	1998	1999	2000	2001
Giro d'Italia	—	—	—	—	—	—	DNF
Tour de France	—	—	131	84	140	111	—
Vuelta a España	DNF	—	—	—	—	—	—

Legend
—	Did not compete
DNF	Did not finish
