= Marty Jemison =

American cyclist (born 1965)

Personal information
- Full name: Marty Jemison
- Born: May 18, 1965 (age 61) Salt Lake City
- Height: 1.80 m (5 ft 11 in)
- Weight: 71 kg (157 lb; 11 st 3 lb)

Cycling career
- Sport: Cycling
- Current team: Retired
- Discipline: Road
- Role: Rider

Professional teams
- 1994: WordPerfect
- 1995-2000: U.S. Postal Service Pro Cycling Team

Marty Jemison (born May 18, 1965) is a former American cyclist. Since retiring from Professional Cycling, Marty has been leading tours for his own company Jemison Cycling Tours An extended list of results can be found here His most successful day in the Tour de France was when he earned a top 5 placing during stage 13 of the 1998 Tour. He got into successful breakaway that stayed away all day and finished nearly three minutes ahead of the Peloton.

== Career ==
Professional from 1994 to 2000, he was most known for being the US National Road Race Champion in 1999. He began his racing career with the amateur team Mi Duole Cycling in Salt Lake City.

When he was a member of the U.S. Postal Service Pro Cycling Team, he participated in two Tours de France and was a teammate of Lance Armstrong. Marty started his Professional career with the Dutch-based WordPerfect team in 1994.

He was selected by U.S. National Team at the UCI World Road Race Championships in 1994 and 1997.

== Major results ==
1993

United States National Road Race Championships amateurs
Tour de Beauce

1996

Cascade Cycling Classic
2nd of Course de la Solidarité Olympique
3rd of the Rutas de América
3rd of the Lancaster Classic

1997

Atlanta GP
First Union Grand Prix

1998

3rd of Atlanta GP

1999

United States National Road Race Championships

2000

3rd of the Wilmington Cycling Classic

== Results on the Tour de France ==
- 1997: 96th
- 1998: 48th

== Race Diaries ==
Marty Jemison's Race Diaries
