= Alain Turicchia =

Italian cyclist

Personal information
- Born: 4 September 1975 (age 51) Faenza, Italy

Cycling career
- Sport: Cycling
- Current team: Retired
- Discipline: Road
- Role: Rider
- Rider type: Sprint

Professional teams
- 1997–1998: Asics–CGA
- 1999: Riso Scotti–Vinavil
- 2000: Amica Chips–Tacconi Sport
- 2001: De Nardi–Pasta Montegrappa

Alain Turicchia (born 4 September 1975) is a former Italian cyclist. He rode in the 1998 Tour de France, where he finished in 74th place and was 9th in the Points classification.

== Major results ==
1996
3rd Giro del Medio Brenta
2000
1st stage 2 Vuelta a Castilla y León
