= List of teams and cyclists in the 1997 Tour de France =

List of cyclists

198 riders in 22 teams commenced the 1997 Tour de France. 139 riders finished.

The 16 teams with the highest UCI ranking at the start of 1997 were automatically qualified.

== Teams ==
Qualified teams

- Team Telekom
- Festina–Lotus
- Mapei–GB
- ONCE
- MG Maglificio–Technogym
- Team Polti
- Cofidis
- Française des Jeux
- Roslotto–ZG Mobili
- GAN
- TVM–Farm Frites
- Saeco–Estro
- Rabobank
- Casino
- Batik–Del Monte
- Banesto

Invited teams

- Lotto–Mobistar–Isoglass
- U.S. Postal Service
- Kelme–Costa Blanca
- Mercatone Uno
- Mutuelle de Seine-et-Marne
- BigMat–Auber 93

== Cyclists ==
=== By starting number ===
Legend
No.	Starting number worn by the rider during the Tour
Pos.	Position in the general classification
DNF	Denotes a rider who did not finish

No.	Name	Nationality	Team	Pos.	Ref
1	Bjarne Riis	Denmark	Team Telekom	7	
2	Rolf Aldag	Germany	Team Telekom	51	
3	Udo Bölts	Germany	Team Telekom	21	
4	Christian Henn	Germany	Team Telekom	84	
5	Jens Heppner	Germany	Team Telekom	60	
6	Giovanni Lombardi	Italy	Team Telekom	118	
7	Georg Totschnig	Austria	Team Telekom	34	
8	Jan Ullrich	Germany	Team Telekom	1	
9	Erik Zabel	Germany	Team Telekom	66	
11	Richard Virenque	France	Festina–Lotus	2	
12	Gianluca Bortolami	Italy	Festina–Lotus	46	
13	Laurent Brochard	France	Festina–Lotus	31	
14	Laurent Dufaux	Switzerland	Festina–Lotus	9	
15	Pascal Hervé	France	Festina–Lotus	36	
16	Joona Laukka	Finland	Festina–Lotus	35	
17	Christophe Moreau	France	Festina–Lotus	19	
18	Didier Rous	France	Festina–Lotus	45	
19	Neil Stephens	Australia	Festina–Lotus	54	
21	Johan Museeuw	Belgium	Mapei–GB	DNF	
22	Oscar Camenzind	Switzerland	Mapei–GB	12	
23	Valentino Fois	Italy	Mapei–GB	DNF	
24	Zenon Jaskuła	Poland	Mapei–GB	59	
25	Daniele Nardello	Italy	Mapei–GB	18	
26	Wilfried Peeters	Belgium	Mapei–GB	89	
27	Tom Steels	Belgium	Mapei–GB	DNF	
28	Andrea Tafi	Italy	Mapei–GB	57	
29	Frank Vandenbroucke	Belgium	Mapei–GB	50	
31	Laurent Jalabert	France	ONCE	43	
32	Íñigo Cuesta	Spain	ONCE	70	
33	David Etxebarria	Spain	ONCE	DNF	
34	Marcelino García	Spain	ONCE	121	
35	Aitor Garmendia	Spain	ONCE	63	
36	Francisco Javier Mauleón	Spain	ONCE	85	
37	José Roberto Sierra	Spain	ONCE	78	
38	Mikel Zarrabeitia	Spain	ONCE	DNF	
39	Alex Zülle	Switzerland	ONCE	DNF	
41	Michele Bartoli	Italy	MG Maglificio–Technogym	DNF	
42	Fabio Baldato	Italy	MG Maglificio–Technogym	DNF	
43	Carlo Finco	Italy	MG Maglificio–Technogym	129	
44	Fabiano Fontanelli	Italy	MG Maglificio–Technogym	DNF	
45	Angelo Lecchi	Italy	MG Maglificio–Technogym	DNF	
46	Nicola Loda	Italy	MG Maglificio–Technogym	110	
47	Luca Scinto	Italy	MG Maglificio–Technogym	120	
48	Gilberto Simoni	Italy	MG Maglificio–Technogym	116	
49	Matteo Tosatto	Italy	MG Maglificio–Technogym	132	
51	Luc Leblanc	France	Team Polti	DNF	
52	Rossano Brasi	Italy	Team Polti	130	
53	Íñigo Chaurreau	Spain	Team Polti	92	
54	Mirco Crepaldi	Italy	Team Polti	123	
55	Gerrit de Vries	Netherlands	Team Polti	125	
56	Mirco Gualdi	Italy	Team Polti	DNF	
57	Giuseppe Guerini	Italy	Team Polti	53	
58	Serguei Outschakov	Ukraine	Team Polti	113	
59	Gianluca Valoti	Italy	Team Polti	86	
61	Tony Rominger	Switzerland	Cofidis	DNF	
62	Frankie Andreu	United States	Cofidis	79	
63	Laurent Desbiens	France	Cofidis	127	
64	Philippe Gaumont	France	Cofidis	139	
65	Nicolas Jalabert	France	Cofidis	135	
66	Bobby Julich	United States	Cofidis	17	
67	Kevin Livingston	United States	Cofidis	38	
68	Christophe Rinero	France	Cofidis	115	
69	Cyril Saugrain	France	Cofidis	DNF	
71	Mauro Gianetti	Switzerland	Française des Jeux	DNF	
72	Frédéric Guesdon	France	Française des Jeux	111	
73	Stéphane Heulot	France	Française des Jeux	20	
74	Christophe Mengin	France	Française des Jeux	48	
75	Damien Nazon	France	Française des Jeux	DNF	
76	Andrea Peron	Italy	Française des Jeux	56	
77	Davide Rebellin	Italy	Française des Jeux	58	
78	Max Sciandri	Great Britain	Française des Jeux	67	
79	Flavio Vanzella	Italy	Française des Jeux	106	
81	Alexander Gontchenkov	Ukraine	Roslotto–ZG Mobili	DNF	
82	Viatcheslav Djavanian	Russia	Roslotto–ZG Mobili	DNF	
83	Marco Fincato	Italy	Roslotto–ZG Mobili	DNF	
84	Vitali Kokorine	Russia	Roslotto–ZG Mobili	DNF	
85	Pavel Padrnos	Czech Republic	Roslotto–ZG Mobili	DNF	
86	Torsten Schmidt	Germany	Roslotto–ZG Mobili	136	
87	Daniele Sgnaolin	Italy	Roslotto–ZG Mobili	72	
88	Massimo Strazzer	Italy	Roslotto–ZG Mobili	DNF	
89	Marco Zen	Italy	Roslotto–ZG Mobili	73	
91	Chris Boardman	Great Britain	GAN	DNF	
92	Frédéric Moncassin	France	GAN	114	
93	Stuart O'Grady	Australia	GAN	109	
94	Eros Poli	Italy	GAN	134	
95	Arnaud Prétot	France	GAN	105	
96	Gérard Rué	France	GAN	DNF	
97	François Simon	France	GAN	32	
98	Cédric Vasseur	France	GAN	40	
99	Henk Vogels	Australia	GAN	99	
101	Maarten den Bakker	Netherlands	TVM–Farm Frites	64	
102	Jeroen Blijlevens	Netherlands	TVM–Farm Frites	126	
103	Bo Hamburger	Denmark	TVM–Farm Frites	DNF	
104	Tristan Hoffman	Netherlands	TVM–Farm Frites	128	
105	Servais Knaven	Netherlands	TVM–Farm Frites	107	
106	Laurent Roux	France	TVM–Farm Frites	23	
107	Jesper Skibby	Denmark	TVM–Farm Frites	82	
108	Peter Van Petegem	Belgium	TVM–Farm Frites	102	
109	Bart Voskamp	Netherlands	TVM–Farm Frites	98	
111	Ivan Gotti	Italy	Saeco–Estro	DNF	
112	Philipp Buschor	Switzerland	Saeco–Estro	137	
113	Francesco Casagrande	Italy	Saeco–Estro	6	
114	Mario Cipollini	Italy	Saeco–Estro	DNF	
115	Gian Matteo Fagnini	Italy	Saeco–Estro	103	
116	Paolo Fornaciari	Italy	Saeco–Estro	DNF	
117	Dario Frigo	Italy	Saeco–Estro	DNF	
118	Giorgio Furlan	Italy	Saeco–Estro	74	
119	Massimiliano Lelli	Italy	Saeco–Estro	47	
121	Peter Luttenberger	Austria	Rabobank	13	
122	Michael Boogerd	Netherlands	Rabobank	16	
123	Erik Breukink	Netherlands	Rabobank	52	
124	Erik Dekker	Netherlands	Rabobank	81	
125	Patrick Jonker	Australia	Rabobank	62	
126	Robbie McEwen	Australia	Rabobank	117	
127	Danny Nelissen	Netherlands	Rabobank	DNF	
128	Rolf Sørensen	Denmark	Rabobank	68	
129	Léon van Bon	Netherlands	Rabobank	DNF	
131	Alberto Elli	Italy	Casino	30	
132	Christophe Agnolutto	France	Casino	94	
133	Lauri Aus	Estonia	Casino	124	
134	Pascal Chanteur	France	Casino	26	
135	Fabrice Gougot	France	Casino	42	
136	Rolf Järmann	Switzerland	Casino	DNF	
137	Artūras Kasputis	Lithuania	Casino	93	
138	Jaan Kirsipuu	Estonia	Casino	DNF	
139	Marco Saligari	Italy	Casino	95	
141	Evgeni Berzin	Russia	Batik–Del Monte	DNF	
142	Andrea Brognara	Italy	Batik–Del Monte	DNF	
143	Bruno Cenghialta	Italy	Batik–Del Monte	112	
144	Luca Colombo	Italy	Batik–Del Monte	DNF	
145	Francesco Frattini	Italy	Batik–Del Monte	DNF	
146	Nicola Minali	Italy	Batik–Del Monte	122	
147	Jon Odriozola	Spain	Batik–Del Monte	65	
148	Gianluca Pierobon	Italy	Batik–Del Monte	133	
149	Giuseppe Tartaggia	Italy	Batik–Del Monte	97	
151	Abraham Olano	Spain	Banesto	4	
152	Marino Alonso	Spain	Banesto	61	
153	José Luis Arrieta	Spain	Banesto	75	
154	Manuel Beltrán	Spain	Banesto	14	
155	Santiago Blanco	Spain	Banesto	27	
156	Ángel Casero	Spain	Banesto	29	
157	José Vicente García	Spain	Banesto	DNF	
158	José María Jiménez	Spain	Banesto	8	
159	Orlando Rodrigues	Portugal	Banesto	33	
161	Laurent Madouas	France	Lotto–Mobistar–Isoglass	25	
162	Djamolidine Abdoujaparov	Uzbekistan	Lotto–Mobistar–Isoglass	DNF	
163	Peter Farazijn	Belgium	Lotto–Mobistar–Isoglass	39	
164	Jo Planckaert	Belgium	Lotto–Mobistar–Isoglass	DNF	
165	Benoît Salmon	France	Lotto–Mobistar–Isoglass	DNF	
166	Andrei Tchmil	Ukraine	Lotto–Mobistar–Isoglass	DNF	
167	Andrey Teteryuk	Kazakhstan	Lotto–Mobistar–Isoglass	DNF	
168	Paul Van Hyfte	Belgium	Lotto–Mobistar–Isoglass	90	
169	Marc Wauters	Belgium	Lotto–Mobistar–Isoglass	DNF	
171	Fernando Escartín	Spain	Kelme–Costa Blanca	5	
172	Francisco Benítez	Spain	Kelme–Costa Blanca	71	
173	Hernán Buenahora	Colombia	Kelme–Costa Blanca	22	
174	Francisco Cabello	Spain	Kelme–Costa Blanca	108	
175	Jose De Los Angeles	Spain	Kelme–Costa Blanca	55	
176	Arsenio González	Spain	Kelme–Costa Blanca	DNF	
177	José Jaime González	Colombia	Kelme–Costa Blanca	DNF	
178	Javier Pascual Rodríguez	Spain	Kelme–Costa Blanca	37	
179	José Ángel Vidal	Spain	Kelme–Costa Blanca	77	
181	Marco Pantani	Italy	Mercatone Uno	3	
182	Marco Artunghi	Italy	Mercatone Uno	91	
183	Roberto Conti	Italy	Mercatone Uno	10	
184	Oscar Pelliccioli	Italy	Mercatone Uno	80	
185	Giusvan Piovaccari	Italy	Mercatone Uno	DNF	
186	Massimo Podenzana	Italy	Mercatone Uno	24	
187	Marcello Siboni	Italy	Mercatone Uno	41	
188	Mario Traversoni	Italy	Mercatone Uno	100	
189	Beat Zberg	Switzerland	Mercatone Uno	11	
191	Viatcheslav Ekimov	Russia	U.S. Postal Service	44	
192	Adriano Baffi	Italy	U.S. Postal Service	119	
193	Dariusz Baranowski	Poland	U.S. Postal Service	87	
194	Pascal Deramé	France	U.S. Postal Service	131	
195	Tyler Hamilton	United States	U.S. Postal Service	69	
196	George Hincapie	United States	U.S. Postal Service	104	
197	Marty Jemison	United States	U.S. Postal Service	96	
198	Peter Meinert Nielsen	Denmark	U.S. Postal Service	49	
199	Jean-Cyril Robin	France	U.S. Postal Service	15	
201	Jean-Philippe Dojwa	France	Mutuelle de Seine-et-Marne	DNF	
202	Jean-François Anti	France	Mutuelle de Seine-et-Marne	DNF	
203	Stéphane Cueff	France	Mutuelle de Seine-et-Marne	138	
204	David Delrieu	France	Mutuelle de Seine-et-Marne	DNF	
205	Gordon Fraser	Canada	Mutuelle de Seine-et-Marne	DNF	
206	Claude Lamour	France	Mutuelle de Seine-et-Marne	DNF	
207	Gilles Maignan	France	Mutuelle de Seine-et-Marne	DNF	
208	Laurent Pillon	France	Mutuelle de Seine-et-Marne	DNF	
209	Dominique Rault	France	Mutuelle de Seine-et-Marne	83	
211	Pascal Lino	France	BigMat–Auber 93	DNF	
212	Miguel Arroyo	Mexico	BigMat–Auber 93	76	
213	Ludovic Auger	France	BigMat–Auber 93	DNF	
214	Thierry Bourguignon	France	BigMat–Auber 93	28	
215	Laurent Genty	France	BigMat–Auber 93	101	
216	Thierry Gouvenou	France	BigMat–Auber 93	88	
217	Pascal Lance	France	BigMat–Auber 93	DNF	
218	Anthony Morin	France	BigMat–Auber 93	DNF	
219	Gilles Talmant	France	BigMat–Auber 93	DNF	

=== By team ===
Team Telekom
No.	Rider	Pos.
1	Bjarne Riis (DEN)	7
2	Rolf Aldag (GER)	51
3	Udo Bölts (GER)	21
4	Christian Henn (GER)	84
5	Jens Heppner (GER)	60
6	Giovanni Lombardi (ITA)	118
7	Georg Totschnig (AUT)	34
8	Jan Ullrich (GER)	1
9	Erik Zabel (GER)	66

Festina–Lotus
No.	Rider	Pos.
11	Richard Virenque (FRA)	2
12	Gianluca Bortolami (ITA)	46
13	Laurent Brochard (FRA)	31
14	Laurent Dufaux (SUI)	9
15	Pascal Hervé (FRA)	36
16	Joona Laukka (FIN)	35
17	Christophe Moreau (FRA)	19
18	Didier Rous (FRA)	45
19	Neil Stephens (AUS)	54

Mapei–GB
No.	Rider	Pos.
21	Johan Museeuw (BEL)	DNF
22	Oscar Camenzind (SUI)	12
23	Valentino Fois (ITA)	DNF
24	Zenon Jaskuła (POL)	59
25	Daniele Nardello (ITA)	18
26	Wilfried Peeters (BEL)	89
27	Tom Steels (BEL)	DNF
28	Andrea Tafi (ITA)	57
29	Frank Vandenbroucke (BEL)	50

ONCE
No.	Rider	Pos.
31	Laurent Jalabert (FRA)	43
32	Íñigo Cuesta (ESP)	70
33	David Etxebarria (ESP)	DNF
34	Marcelino García (ESP)	121
35	Aitor Garmendia (ESP)	63
36	Francisco Javier Mauleón (ESP)	85
37	José Roberto Sierra (ESP)	78
38	Mikel Zarrabeitia (ESP)	DNF
39	Alex Zülle (SUI)	DNF

MG Maglificio–Technogym
No.	Rider	Pos.
41	Michele Bartoli (ITA)	DNF
42	Fabio Baldato (ITA)	DNF
43	Carlo Finco (ITA)	129
44	Fabiano Fontanelli (ITA)	DNF
45	Angelo Lecchi (ITA)	DNF
46	Nicola Loda (ITA)	110
47	Luca Scinto (ITA)	120
48	Gilberto Simoni (ITA)	116
49	Matteo Tosatto (ITA)	132

Team Polti
No.	Rider	Pos.
51	Luc Leblanc (FRA)	DNF
52	Rossano Brasi (ITA)	130
53	Íñigo Chaurreau (ESP)	92
54	Mirco Crepaldi (ITA)	123
55	Gerrit de Vries (NED)	125
56	Mirco Gualdi (ITA)	DNF
57	Giuseppe Guerini (ITA)	53
58	Serguei Outschakov (UKR)	113
59	Gianluca Valoti (ITA)	86

Cofidis
No.	Rider	Pos.
61	Tony Rominger (SUI)	DNF
62	Frankie Andreu (USA)	79
63	Laurent Desbiens (FRA)	127
64	Philippe Gaumont (FRA)	139
65	Nicolas Jalabert (FRA)	135
66	Bobby Julich (USA)	17
67	Kevin Livingston (USA)	38
68	Christophe Rinero (FRA)	115
69	Cyril Saugrain (FRA)	DNF

Française des Jeux
No.	Rider	Pos.
71	Mauro Gianetti (SUI)	DNF
72	Frédéric Guesdon (FRA)	111
73	Stéphane Heulot (FRA)	20
74	Christophe Mengin (FRA)	48
75	Damien Nazon (FRA)	DNF
76	Andrea Peron (ITA)	56
77	Davide Rebellin (ITA)	58
78	Max Sciandri (GBR)	67
79	Flavio Vanzella (ITA)	106

Roslotto–ZG Mobili
No.	Rider	Pos.
81	Alexander Gontchenkov (UKR)	DNF
82	Viatcheslav Djavanian (RUS)	DNF
83	Marco Fincato (ITA)	DNF
84	Vitali Kokorin (RUS)	DNF
85	Pavel Padrnos (CZE)	DNF
86	Torsten Schmidt (GER)	136
87	Daniele Sgnaolin (ITA)	72
88	Massimo Strazzer (ITA)	DNF
89	Marco Zen (ITA)	73

GAN
No.	Rider	Pos.
91	Chris Boardman (GBR)	DNF
92	Frédéric Moncassin (FRA)	114
93	Stuart O'Grady (AUS)	109
94	Eros Poli (ITA)	134
95	Arnaud Prétot (FRA)	105
96	Gérard Rué (FRA)	DNF
97	François Simon (FRA)	32
98	Cédric Vasseur (FRA)	40
99	Henk Vogels (AUS)	99

TVM–Farm Frites
No.	Rider	Pos.
101	Maarten den Bakker (NED)	64
102	Jeroen Blijlevens (NED)	126
103	Bo Hamburger (DEN)	DNF
104	Tristan Hoffman (NED)	128
105	Servais Knaven (NED)	107
106	Laurent Roux (FRA)	23
107	Jesper Skibby (DEN)	82
108	Peter Van Petegem (BEL)	102
109	Bart Voskamp (NED)	98

Saeco–Estro
No.	Rider	Pos.
111	Ivan Gotti (ITA)	DNF
112	Philipp Buschor (SUI)	137
113	Francesco Casagrande (ITA)	6
114	Mario Cipollini (ITA)	DNF
115	Gian Matteo Fagnini (ITA)	103
116	Paolo Fornaciari (ITA)	DNF
117	Dario Frigo (ITA)	DNF
118	Giorgio Furlan (ITA)	74
119	Massimiliano Lelli (ITA)	47

Rabobank
No.	Rider	Pos.
121	Peter Luttenberger (AUT)	13
122	Michael Boogerd (NED)	16
123	Erik Breukink (NED)	52
124	Erik Dekker (NED)	81
125	Patrick Jonker (AUS)	62
126	Robbie McEwen (AUS)	117
127	Danny Nelissen (NED)	DNF
128	Rolf Sørensen (DEN)	68
129	Léon van Bon (NED)	DNF

Casino
No.	Rider	Pos.
131	Alberto Elli (ITA)	30
132	Christophe Agnolutto (FRA)	94
133	Lauri Aus (EST)	124
134	Pascal Chanteur (FRA)	26
135	Fabrice Gougot (FRA)	42
136	Rolf Järmann (SUI)	DNF
137	Artūras Kasputis (LTU)	93
138	Jaan Kirsipuu (EST)	DNF
139	Marco Saligari (ITA)	95

Batik–Del Monte
No.	Rider	Pos.
141	Evgeni Berzin (RUS)	DNF
142	Andrea Brognara (ITA)	DNF
143	Bruno Cenghialta (ITA)	112
144	Luca Colombo (ITA)	DNF
145	Francesco Frattini (ITA)	DNF
146	Nicola Minali (ITA)	122
147	Jon Odriozola (ESP)	65
148	Gianluca Pierobon (ITA)	133
149	Giuseppe Tartaggia (ITA)	97

Banesto
No.	Rider	Pos.
151	Abraham Olano (ESP)	4
152	Marino Alonso (ESP)	61
153	José Luis Arrieta (ESP)	75
154	Manuel Beltrán (ESP)	14
155	Santiago Blanco (ESP)	27
156	Ángel Casero (ESP)	29
157	José Vicente García (ESP)	DNF
158	José María Jiménez (ESP)	8
159	Orlando Rodrigues (POR)	33

Lotto–Mobistar–Isoglass
No.	Rider	Pos.
161	Laurent Madouas (FRA)	25
162	Djamolidine Abdoujaparov (UZB)	DNF
163	Peter Farazijn (BEL)	39
164	Jo Planckaert (BEL)	DNF
165	Benoît Salmon (FRA)	DNF
166	Andrei Tchmil (UKR)	DNF
167	Andrey Teteryuk (KAZ)	DNF
168	Paul Van Hyfte (BEL)	90
169	Marc Wauters (BEL)	DNF

Kelme–Costa Blanca
No.	Rider	Pos.
171	Fernando Escartín (ESP)	5
172	Francisco Benítez (ESP)	71
173	Hernán Buenahora (COL)	22
174	Francisco Cabello (ESP)	108
175	Jose De Los Angeles (ESP)	55
176	Arsenio González (ESP)	DNF
177	José Jaime González (COL)	DNF
178	Javier Pascual Rodríguez (ESP)	37
179	José Ángel Vidal (ESP)	77

Mercatone Uno
No.	Rider	Pos.
181	Marco Pantani (ITA)	3
182	Marco Artunghi (ITA)	91
183	Roberto Conti (ITA)	10
184	Oscar Pelliccioli (ITA)	80
185	Giusvan Piovaccari (ITA)	DNF
186	Massimo Podenzana (ITA)	24
187	Marcello Siboni (ITA)	41
188	Mario Traversoni (ITA)	100
189	Beat Zberg (SUI)	11

U.S. Postal Service
No.	Rider	Pos.
191	Viatcheslav Ekimov (RUS)	44
192	Adriano Baffi (ITA)	119
193	Dariusz Baranowski (POL)	87
194	Pascal Deramé (FRA)	131
195	Tyler Hamilton (USA)	69
196	George Hincapie (USA)	104
197	Marty Jemison (USA)	96
198	Peter Meinert Nielsen (DEN)	49
199	Jean-Cyril Robin (FRA)	15

La Mutuelle de Seine et Marne
No.	Rider	Pos.
201	Jean-Philippe Dojwa (FRA)	DNF
202	Jean-François Anti (FRA)	DNF
203	Stéphane Cueff (FRA)	138
204	David Delrieu (FRA)	DNF
205	Gordon Fraser (CAN)	DNF
206	Claude Lamour (FRA)	DNF
207	Gilles Maignan (FRA)	DNF
208	Laurent Pillon (FRA)	DNF
209	Dominique Rault (FRA)	83

BigMat–Auber 93
No.	Rider	Pos.
211	Pascal Lino (FRA)	DNF
212	Miguel Arroyo (MEX)	76
213	Ludovic Auger (FRA)	DNF
214	Thierry Bourguignon (FRA)	28
215	Laurent Genty (FRA)	101
216	Thierry Gouvenou (FRA)	88
217	Pascal Lance (FRA)	DNF
218	Anthony Morin (FRA)	DNF
219	Gilles Talmant (FRA)	DNF

=== By nationality ===
Country	No. of riders	In competition	Stage wins
Australia	5	5	1 (Neil Stephens)
Austria	2	2	
Belgium	9	5	
Canada	1	0	
Colombia	2	1	
Czech Republic	1	0	
Denmark	5	4	
Estonia	2	1	
Finland	1	1	
France	45	29	6 (Cédric Vasseur, Laurent Brochard, Laurent Desbiens, Richard Virenque, Christophe Mengin, Didier Rous)
Germany	7	7	5 (Erik Zabel x3, Jan Ullrich x2)
Great Britain	2	1	1 (Chris Boardman)
Italy	62	53	7 (Mario Cipollini x2, Nicola Minali x2 Marco Pantani x2, Mario Traversoni)
Kazakhstan	1	0	
Lithuania	1	1	
Mexico	1	1	
Netherlands	11	9	1 (Jeroen Blijlevens)
Poland	2	2	
Portugal	1	1	
Russia	4	1	
Spain	24	20	1 (Abraham Olano)
Switzerland	8	4	
Ukraine	3	1	
United States	6	6	
Uzbekistan	1	1	
Total	198	139	22
