= List of teams and cyclists in the 1999 Tour de France =

List of cyclists

In the 1999 Tour de France, the following 20 teams were each allowed to field nine cyclists:

After the doping controversies in the 1998 Tour de France, the Tour organisation banned some persons from the race, including cyclist Richard Virenque, Laurent Roux and Philippe Gaumont, manager Manolo Saiz and the entire TVM–Farm Frites team. Virenque's team Polti then appealed at the UCI against this decision, and the UCI then forced the Tour organisation to allow Virenque and Saiz entry in the Tour.

Initially, the Vini Caldirola team had been selected, but after their team leader Serhiy Honchar failed a blood test in the 1999 Tour de Suisse, the tour organisation removed Vini Caldirola from the starting list, and replaced them by Cantina Tollo–Alexia Alluminio, the first reserve team.

== Teams ==
Qualified teams

- Mapei–Quick-Step
- Rabobank
- ONCE–Deutsche Bank
- Team Polti
- Saeco–Cannondale
- Lotto–Mobistar
- Casino–Ag2r Prévoyance
- Mercatone Uno–Bianchi
- Kelme–Costa Blanca
- Cofidis
- Vitalicio Seguros
- Team Telekom
- Crédit Agricole
- Festina–Lotus
- Banesto
- Cantina Tollo–Alexia Alluminio
- Française des Jeux

Invited teams

- U.S. Postal Service
- BigMat–Auber 93
- Lampre–Daikin

== Cyclists ==
=== By starting number ===
Legend
No.	Starting number worn by the rider during the Tour
Pos.	Position in the general classification
DNF	Denotes a rider who did not finish

No.	Name	Nationality	Team	Pos.	Ref
1	Bobby Julich	United States	Cofidis	DNF	
2	Steve De Wolf	Belgium	Cofidis	41	
3	Laurent Desbiens	France	Cofidis	100	
4	Peter Farazijn	Belgium	Cofidis	63	
5	Claude Lamour	France	Cofidis	117	
6	Massimiliano Lelli	Italy	Cofidis	34	
7	Thierry Loder	France	Cofidis	139	
8	Roland Meier	Switzerland	Cofidis	15	
9	Christophe Rinero	France	Cofidis	79	
11	Stefano Garzelli	Italy	Mercatone Uno–Bianchi	32	
12	Marco Artunghi	Italy	Mercatone Uno–Bianchi	DNF	
13	Sergio Barbero	Italy	Mercatone Uno–Bianchi	124	
14	Roberto Conti	Italy	Mercatone Uno–Bianchi	DNF	
15	Michele Coppolillo	Italy	Mercatone Uno–Bianchi	DNF	
16	Marco Fincato	Italy	Mercatone Uno–Bianchi	53	
17	Riccardo Forconi	Italy	Mercatone Uno–Bianchi	87	
18	Dimitri Konyshev	Russia	Mercatone Uno–Bianchi	62	
19	Massimiliano Napolitano	Italy	Mercatone Uno–Bianchi	134	
21	Erik Zabel	Germany	Team Telekom	89	
22	Udo Bölts	Germany	Team Telekom	40	
23	Alberto Elli	Italy	Team Telekom	17	
24	Giuseppe Guerini	Italy	Team Telekom	22	
25	Kai Hundertmarck	Germany	Team Telekom	110	
26	Jörg Jaksche	Germany	Team Telekom	80	
27	Jan Schaffrath	Germany	Team Telekom	136	
28	Georg Totschnig	Austria	Team Telekom	20	
29	Steffen Wesemann	Germany	Team Telekom	73	
31	Pavel Tonkov	Russia	Mapei–Quick-Step	DNF	
32	Davide Bramati	Italy	Mapei–Quick-Step	103	
33	Gianni Faresin	Italy	Mapei–Quick-Step	23	
34	Manuel Fernández Ginés	Spain	Mapei–Quick-Step	49	
35	Paolo Lanfranchi	Italy	Mapei–Quick-Step	18	
36	Bart Leysen	Belgium	Mapei–Quick-Step	133	
37	Axel Merckx	Belgium	Mapei–Quick-Step	DNF	
38	Daniele Nardello	Italy	Mapei–Quick-Step	7	
39	Tom Steels	Belgium	Mapei–Quick-Step	104	
41	Michael Boogerd	Netherlands	Rabobank	56	
42	Erik Dekker	Netherlands	Rabobank	107	
43	Maarten den Bakker	Netherlands	Rabobank	84	
44	Patrick Jonker	Australia	Rabobank	97	
45	Marc Lotz	Netherlands	Rabobank	72	
46	Robbie McEwen	Australia	Rabobank	122	
47	Léon van Bon	Netherlands	Rabobank	DNF	
48	Marc Wauters	Belgium	Rabobank	DNF	
49	Beat Zberg	Switzerland	Rabobank	109	
51	Abraham Olano	Spain	ONCE–Deutsche Bank	6	
52	Rafael Díaz Justo	Spain	ONCE–Deutsche Bank	58	
53	David Etxebarria	Spain	ONCE–Deutsche Bank	12	
54	Marcelino García	Spain	ONCE–Deutsche Bank	DNF	
55	Santos González	Spain	ONCE–Deutsche Bank	61	
56	Luis Pérez Rodríguez	Spain	ONCE–Deutsche Bank	29	
57	Andrea Peron	Italy	ONCE–Deutsche Bank	10	
58	José Luis Rebollo	Spain	ONCE–Deutsche Bank	75	
59	Marcos-Antonio Serrano	Spain	ONCE–Deutsche Bank	25	
61	Ivan Gotti	Italy	Team Polti	DNF	
62	Rossano Brasi	Italy	Team Polti	127	
63	Stefano Cattai	Italy	Team Polti	66	
64	Mirko Crepaldi	Italy	Team Polti	120	
65	Stéphane Goubert	France	Team Polti	74	
66	Silvio Martinello	Italy	Team Polti	114	
67	Oscar Pelliccioli	Italy	Team Polti	DNF	
68	Fabio Sacchi	Italy	Team Polti	99	
69	Richard Virenque	France	Team Polti	8	
71	Mario Cipollini	Italy	Saeco–Cannondale	DNF	
72	Giuseppe Calcaterra	Italy	Saeco–Cannondale	DNF	
73	Salvatore Commesso	Italy	Saeco–Cannondale	38	
74	Laurent Dufaux	Switzerland	Saeco–Cannondale	4	
75	Gian Matteo Fagnini	Italy	Saeco–Cannondale	DNF	
76	Armin Meier	Switzerland	Saeco–Cannondale	31	
77	Paolo Savoldelli	Italy	Saeco–Cannondale	DNF	
78	Mario Scirea	Italy	Saeco–Cannondale	DNF	
79	Francesco Secchiari	Italy	Saeco–Cannondale	DNF	
81	Mario Aerts	Belgium	Lotto–Mobistar	21	
82	Fabien De Waele	Belgium	Lotto–Mobistar	108	
83	Sébastien Demarbaix	Belgium	Lotto–Mobistar	130	
84	Jacky Durand	France	Lotto–Mobistar	141	
85	Thierry Marichal	Belgium	Lotto–Mobistar	128	
86	Kurt Van De Wouwer	Belgium	Lotto–Mobistar	11	
87	Rik Verbrugghe	Belgium	Lotto–Mobistar	71	
88	Geert Verheyen	Belgium	Lotto–Mobistar	45	
89	Peter Wuyts	Belgium	Lotto–Mobistar	112	
91	Alexander Vinokourov	Kazakhstan	Casino–Ag2r Prévoyance	35	
92	Stéphane Barthe	France	Casino–Ag2r Prévoyance	DNF	
93	Frédéric Bessy	France	Casino–Ag2r Prévoyance	42	
94	Pascal Chanteur	France	Casino–Ag2r Prévoyance	91	
95	Fabrice Gougot	France	Casino–Ag2r Prévoyance	69	
96	Jaan Kirsipuu	Estonia	Casino–Ag2r Prévoyance	DNF	
97	Gilles Maignan	France	Casino–Ag2r Prévoyance	82	
98	Christophe Oriol	France	Casino–Ag2r Prévoyance	67	
99	Benoît Salmon	France	Casino–Ag2r Prévoyance	16	
101	Marco Serpellini	Italy	Lampre–Daikin	55	
102	Raivis Belohvoščiks	Latvia	Lampre–Daikin	DNF	
103	Ludo Dierckxsens	Belgium	Lampre–Daikin	DNF	
104	Pavel Padrnos	Czech Republic	Lampre–Daikin	DNF	
105	Mariano Piccoli	Italy	Lampre–Daikin	50	
106	Marco Pinotti	Italy	Lampre–Daikin	113	
107	Zbigniew Spruch	Poland	Lampre–Daikin	DNF	
108	Ján Svorada	Czech Republic	Lampre–Daikin	DNF	
109	Johan Verstrepen	Belgium	Lampre–Daikin	DNF	
111	Fernando Escartín	Spain	Kelme–Costa Blanca	3	
112	José Castelblanco	Colombia	Kelme–Costa Blanca	37	
113	Carlos Contreras	Colombia	Kelme–Costa Blanca	19	
114	José de Los Angeles	Spain	Kelme–Costa Blanca	129	
115	José Javier Gómez	Spain	Kelme–Costa Blanca	59	
116	Javier Otxoa	Spain	Kelme–Costa Blanca	86	
117	Javier Pascual Llorente	Spain	Kelme–Costa Blanca	DNF	
118	Javier Pascual Rodríguez	Spain	Kelme–Costa Blanca	33	
119	José Ángel Vidal	Spain	Kelme–Costa Blanca	101	
121	Ángel Casero	Spain	Vitalicio Seguros	5	
122	Elio Aggiano	Italy	Vitalicio Seguros	92	
123	Hernán Buenahora	Colombia	Vitalicio Seguros	64	
124	Francisco Cerezo	Spain	Vitalicio Seguros	47	
125	Francisco Tomás García	Spain	Vitalicio Seguros	26	
126	Álvaro González de Galdeano	Spain	Vitalicio Seguros	24	
127	Pedro Horrillo	Spain	Vitalicio Seguros	135	
128	Prudencio Indurain	Spain	Vitalicio Seguros	76	
129	Ginés Salmerón	Spain	Vitalicio Seguros	DNF	
131	François Simon	France	Crédit Agricole	30	
132	Magnus Bäckstedt	Sweden	Crédit Agricole	DNF	
133	Chris Boardman	Great Britain	Crédit Agricole	119	
134	Sébastien Hinault	France	Crédit Agricole	123	
135	Anthony Langella	France	Crédit Agricole	132	
136	Stuart O'Grady	Australia	Crédit Agricole	94	
137	Cédric Vasseur	France	Crédit Agricole	83	
138	Henk Vogels	Australia	Crédit Agricole	121	
139	Jens Voigt	Germany	Crédit Agricole	60	
141	Wladimir Belli	Italy	Festina–Lotus	9	
142	Laurent Brochard	France	Festina–Lotus	77	
143	Jaime Hernández	Spain	Festina–Lotus	102	
144	Rolf Huser	Switzerland	Festina–Lotus	118	
145	Fabian Jeker	Switzerland	Festina–Lotus	57	
146	Laurent Lefèvre	France	Festina–Lotus	88	
147	Laurent Madouas	France	Festina–Lotus	44	
148	Christophe Moreau	France	Festina–Lotus	27	
149	Didier Rous	France	Festina–Lotus	DNF	
151	Jean-Cyril Robin	France	Française des Jeux	52	
152	Christophe Bassons	France	Française des Jeux	DNF	
153	Jimmy Casper	France	Française des Jeux	DNF	
154	Frédéric Guesdon	France	Française des Jeux	106	
155	Stéphane Heulot	France	Française des Jeux	14	
156	Christophe Mengin	France	Française des Jeux	70	
157	Lars Michaelsen	Denmark	Française des Jeux	116	
158	Anthony Morin	France	Française des Jeux	105	
159	Damien Nazon	France	Française des Jeux	DNF	
161	Alex Zülle	Switzerland	Banesto	2	
162	José Luis Arrieta	Spain	Banesto	46	
163	Manuel Beltrán	Spain	Banesto	DNF	
164	José Vicente García	Spain	Banesto	68	
165	Francisco Mancebo	Spain	Banesto	28	
166	David Navas	Spain	Banesto	98	
167	Jon Odriozola	Spain	Banesto	54	
168	Miguel Ángel Peña	Spain	Banesto	43	
169	César Solaun	Spain	Banesto	39	
171	Bo Hamburger	Denmark	Cantina Tollo–Alexia Alluminio	DNF	
172	Alessandro Baronti	Italy	Cantina Tollo–Alexia Alluminio	138	
173	Gabriele Colombo	Italy	Cantina Tollo–Alexia Alluminio	125	
174	Moreno Di Biase	Italy	Cantina Tollo–Alexia Alluminio	DNF	
175	Massimo Giunti	Italy	Cantina Tollo–Alexia Alluminio	95	
176	Marcus Ljungqvist	Sweden	Cantina Tollo–Alexia Alluminio	131	
177	Luca Mazzanti	Italy	Cantina Tollo–Alexia Alluminio	137	
178	Nicola Minali	Italy	Cantina Tollo–Alexia Alluminio	DNF	
179	Gianpaolo Mondini	Italy	Cantina Tollo–Alexia Alluminio	81	
~~181~~	~~Lance Armstrong~~	~~United States~~	~~U.S. Postal Service~~	~~1~~	
182	Frankie Andreu	United States	U.S. Postal Service	65	
183	Pascal Deramé	France	U.S. Postal Service	140	
184	Tyler Hamilton	United States	U.S. Postal Service	13	
185	George Hincapie	United States	U.S. Postal Service	78	
186	Kevin Livingston	United States	U.S. Postal Service	36	
187	Peter Meinert Nielsen	Denmark	U.S. Postal Service	DNF	
188	Christian Vande Velde	United States	U.S. Postal Service	85	
189	Jonathan Vaughters	United States	U.S. Postal Service	DNF	
191	Ludovic Auger	France	BigMat–Auber 93	111	
192	Thierry Bourguignon	France	BigMat–Auber 93	48	
193	Christophe Capelle	France	BigMat–Auber 93	115	
194	Carlos Da Cruz	France	BigMat–Auber 93	126	
195	Thierry Gouvenou	France	BigMat–Auber 93	96	
196	Lylian Lebreton	France	BigMat–Auber 93	51	
197	Dominique Rault	France	BigMat–Auber 93	90	
198	Alexei Sivakov	France	BigMat–Auber 93	93	
199	Jay Sweet	Australia	BigMat–Auber 93	DNF	

=== By team ===
Cofidis
No.	Rider	Pos.
1	Bobby Julich (USA)	DNF
2	Steve De Wolf (BEL)	41
3	Laurent Desbiens (FRA)	100
4	Peter Farazijn (BEL)	63
5	Claude Lamour (FRA)	117
6	Massimiliano Lelli (ITA)	34
7	Thierry Loder (FRA)	139
8	Roland Meier (SUI)	15
9	Christophe Rinero (FRA)	79

Mercatone Uno–Bianchi
No.	Rider	Pos.
11	Stefano Garzelli (ITA)	32
12	Marco Artunghi (ITA)	DNF
13	Sergio Barbero (ITA)	124
14	Roberto Conti (ITA)	DNF
15	Michele Coppolillo (ITA)	DNF
16	Marco Fincato (ITA)	53
17	Riccardo Forconi (ITA)	87
18	Dimitri Konyshev (RUS)	62
19	Massimiliano Napolitano (ITA)	134

Team Telekom
No.	Rider	Pos.
21	Erik Zabel (GER)	89
22	Udo Bölts (GER)	40
23	Alberto Elli (ITA)	17
24	Giuseppe Guerini (ITA)	22
25	Kai Hundertmarck (GER)	110
26	Jörg Jaksche (GER)	80
27	Jan Schaffrath (GER)	136
28	Georg Totschnig (AUT)	20
29	Steffen Wesemann (GER)	73

Mapei–Quick-Step
No.	Rider	Pos.
31	Pavel Tonkov (RUS)	DNF
32	Davide Bramati (ITA)	103
33	Gianni Faresin (ITA)	23
34	Manuel Fernández Ginés (ESP)	49
35	Paolo Lanfranchi (ITA)	18
36	Bart Leysen (BEL)	133
37	Axel Merckx (BEL)	DNF
38	Daniele Nardello (ITA)	7
39	Tom Steels (BEL)	104

Rabobank
No.	Rider	Pos.
41	Michael Boogerd (NED)	56
42	Erik Dekker (NED)	107
43	Maarten den Bakker (NED)	84
44	Patrick Jonker (AUS)	97
45	Marc Lotz (NED)	72
46	Robbie McEwen (AUS)	122
47	Léon van Bon (NED)	DNF
48	Marc Wauters (BEL)	DNF
49	Beat Zberg (SUI)	109

ONCE–Deutsche Bank
No.	Rider	Pos.
51	Abraham Olano (ESP)	6
52	Rafael Díaz Justo (ESP)	58
53	David Etxebarria (ESP)	12
54	Marcelino García (ESP)	DNF
55	Santos González (ESP)	61
56	Luis Pérez Rodríguez (ESP)	29
57	Andrea Peron (ITA)	10
58	José Luis Rebollo (ESP)	75
59	Marcos-Antonio Serrano (ESP)	25

Team Polti
No.	Rider	Pos.
61	Ivan Gotti (ITA)	DNF
62	Rossano Brasi (ITA)	127
63	Stefano Cattai (ITA)	66
64	Mirko Crepaldi (ITA)	120
65	Stéphane Goubert (FRA)	74
66	Silvio Martinello (ITA)	114
67	Oscar Pelliccioli (ITA)	DNF
68	Fabio Sacchi (ITA)	99
69	Richard Virenque (FRA)	8

Saeco–Cannondale
No.	Rider	Pos.
71	Mario Cipollini (ITA)	DNF
72	Giuseppe Calcaterra (ITA)	DNF
73	Salvatore Commesso (ITA)	38
74	Laurent Dufaux (SUI)	4
75	Gian Matteo Fagnini (ITA)	DNF
76	Armin Meier (SUI)	31
77	Paolo Savoldelli (ITA)	DNF
78	Mario Scirea (ITA)	DNF
79	Francesco Secchiari (ITA)	DNF

Lotto–Mobistar
No.	Rider	Pos.
81	Mario Aerts (BEL)	21
82	Fabien De Waele (BEL)	108
83	Sébastien Demarbaix (BEL)	130
84	Jacky Durand (FRA)	141
85	Thierry Marichal (BEL)	128
86	Kurt Van De Wouwer (BEL)	11
87	Rik Verbrugghe (BEL)	71
88	Geert Verheyen (BEL)	45
89	Peter Wuyts (BEL)	112

Casino–Ag2r Prévoyance
No.	Rider	Pos.
91	Alexander Vinokourov (KAZ)	35
92	Stéphane Barthe (FRA)	DNF
93	Frédéric Bessy (FRA)	42
94	Pascal Chanteur (FRA)	91
95	Fabrice Gougot (FRA)	69
96	Jaan Kirsipuu (EST)	DNF
97	Gilles Maignan (FRA)	82
98	Christophe Oriol (FRA)	67
99	Benoît Salmon (FRA)	16

Lampre–Daikin
No.	Rider	Pos.
101	Marco Serpellini (ITA)	55
102	Raivis Belohvoščiks (LAT)	DNF
103	Ludo Dierckxsens (BEL)	DNF
104	Pavel Padrnos (CZE)	DNF
105	Mariano Piccoli (ITA)	50
106	Marco Pinotti (ITA)	113
107	Zbigniew Spruch (POL)	DNF
108	Ján Svorada (CZE)	DNF
109	Johan Verstrepen (BEL)	DNF

Kelme–Costa Blanca
No.	Rider	Pos.
111	Fernando Escartín (ESP)	3
112	José Castelblanco (COL)	37
113	Carlos Contreras (COL)	19
114	José de Los Angeles (ESP)	129
115	José Javier Gómez (ESP)	59
116	Javier Otxoa (ESP)	86
117	Javier Pascual Llorente (ESP)	DNF
118	Javier Pascual Rodríguez (ESP)	33
119	José Ángel Vidal (ESP)	101

Vitalicio Seguros
No.	Rider	Pos.
121	Ángel Casero (ESP)	5
122	Elio Aggiano (ITA)	92
123	Hernán Buenahora (COL)	64
124	Francisco Cerezo (ESP)	47
125	Francisco Tomás García (ESP)	26
126	Álvaro González de Galdeano (ESP)	24
127	Pedro Horrillo (ESP)	135
128	Prudencio Indurain (ESP)	76
129	Ginés Salmerón (ESP)	DNF

Crédit Agricole
No.	Rider	Pos.
131	François Simon (FRA)	30
132	Magnus Bäckstedt (SWE)	DNF
133	Chris Boardman (GBR)	119
134	Sébastien Hinault (FRA)	123
135	Anthony Langella (FRA)	132
136	Stuart O'Grady (AUS)	94
137	Cédric Vasseur (FRA)	83
138	Henk Vogels (AUS)	121
139	Jens Voigt (GER)	60

Festina–Lotus
No.	Rider	Pos.
141	Wladimir Belli (ITA)	9
142	Laurent Brochard (FRA)	77
143	Jaime Hernández (ESP)	102
144	Rolf Huser (SUI)	118
145	Fabian Jeker (SUI)	57
146	Laurent Lefèvre (FRA)	88
147	Laurent Madouas (FRA)	44
148	Christophe Moreau (FRA)	27
149	Didier Rous (FRA)	DNF

Française des Jeux
No.	Rider	Pos.
151	Jean-Cyril Robin (FRA)	52
152	Christophe Bassons (FRA)	DNF
153	Jimmy Casper (FRA)	DNF
154	Frédéric Guesdon (FRA)	106
155	Stéphane Heulot (FRA)	14
156	Christophe Mengin (FRA)	70
157	Lars Michaelsen (DEN)	116
158	Anthony Morin (FRA)	105
159	Damien Nazon (FRA)	DNF

Banesto
No.	Rider	Pos.
161	Alex Zülle (SUI)	2
162	José Luis Arrieta (ESP)	46
163	Manuel Beltrán (ESP)	DNF
164	José Vicente García (ESP)	68
165	Francisco Mancebo (ESP)	28
166	David Navas (ESP)	98
167	Jon Odriozola (ESP)	54
168	Miguel Ángel Peña (ESP)	43
169	César Solaun (ESP)	39

Cantina Tollo–Alexia Alluminio
No.	Rider	Pos.
171	Bo Hamburger (DEN)	DNF
172	Alessandro Baronti (ITA)	138
173	Gabriele Colombo (ITA)	125
174	Moreno Di Biase (ITA)	DNF
175	Massimo Giunti (ITA)	95
176	Marcus Ljungqvist (SWE)	131
177	Luca Mazzanti (ITA)	137
178	Nicola Minali (ITA)	DNF
179	Gianpaolo Mondini (ITA)	81

U.S. Postal Service
No.	Rider	Pos.
~~181~~	~~Lance Armstrong (USA)~~	~~1~~
182	Frankie Andreu (USA)	65
183	Pascal Deramé (FRA)	140
184	Tyler Hamilton (USA)	13
185	George Hincapie (USA)	78
186	Kevin Livingston (USA)	36
187	Peter Meinert Nielsen (DEN)	DNF
188	Christian Vande Velde (USA)	85
189	Jonathan Vaughters (USA)	DNF

BigMat–Auber 93
No.	Rider	Pos.
191	Ludovic Auger (FRA)	111
192	Thierry Bourguignon (FRA)	48
193	Christophe Capelle (FRA)	115
194	Carlos Da Cruz (FRA)	126
195	Thierry Gouvenou (FRA)	96
196	Lylian Lebreton (FRA)	51
197	Dominique Rault (FRA)	90
198	Alexei Sivakov (RUS)	93
199	Jay Sweet (AUS)	DNF
