= 1998 Critérium du Dauphiné Libéré =

Race details
- Dates: 7–14 June 1998
- Stages: 7 + Prologue
- Distance: 1,063.2 km (660.6 mi)
- Winning time: 28h 08' 56"

Results
Jersey awarded to the overall winner	Winner	Armand de Las Cuevas (FRA)	(Banesto)
	Second	Miguel Ángel Peña (ESP)	(Banesto)
	Third	Andrey Teteryuk (KAZ)	(Lotto–Mobistar)
Jersey awarded to the points classification winner	Points	Christophe Moreau (FRA)	(Festina–Lotus)
Jersey awarded to the mountains classification winner	Mountains	José María Jiménez (ESP)	(Banesto)
	Combination	José María Jiménez (ESP)	(Banesto)
	Team	Banesto	

The 1998 Critérium du Dauphiné Libéré was the 50th edition of the cycle race and was held from 7 June to 14 June 1998. The race started in Villeurbanne and finished in Megève. The race was won by Armand de Las Cuevas of the Banesto team.

== Teams ==
Fifteen teams, containing a total of 120 riders, participated in the race:

- Team Telekom
- Festina–Lotus
- Casino–Ag2r
- ONCE
- Rabobank
- Banesto
- GAN
- Lotto–Mobistar
- Française des Jeux
- Cofidis
- Kelme–Costa Blanca
- U.S. Postal Service
- Vitalicio Seguros
- BigMat–Auber 93
- Mutuelle de Seine-et-Marne

== Route ==
Stage characteristics and winners
Stage	Date	Course	Distance	Type	Winner
P	7 June	Villeurbanne	5 km (3.1 mi)	Individual time trial	Chris Boardman (GBR)
1	8 June	Villeurbanne to Charvieu-Chavagneux	190 km (120 mi)		Max Sciandri (GBR)
2	9 June	Charvieu-Chavagneux to Vals-les-Bains	198 km (123 mi)		Damien Nazon (FRA)
3	10 June	Vals-les-Bains to Mont Ventoux	164 km (102 mi)		José María Jiménez (ESP)
4	11 June	Saint-Paul-Trois-Châteaux to Saint-Paul-Trois-Châteaux	41.2 km (25.6 mi)	Individual time trial	Chris Boardman (GBR)
5	12 June	Crest to Grenoble	160 km (99 mi)		Max Sciandri (GBR)
6	13 June	Challes-les-Eaux to Megève Côte 2000	161 km (100 mi)		Richard Virenque (FRA)
7	14 June	Megève to Megève	144 km (89 mi)		Miguel Ángel Peña (ESP)

== Stages ==
=== Prologue ===
7 June 1998 – Villeurbanne, 5 km (3.1 mi) (ITT)

Prologue result and general classification after Prologue

Rank	Rider	Team	Time
1	Chris Boardman (GBR)	GAN	5' 40"
2	Christophe Moreau (FRA)	Festina–Lotus	s.t.
3	Laurent Jalabert (FRA)	ONCE	+ 3"

=== Stage 1 ===
8 June 1998 – Villeurbanne to Charvieu-Chavagneux, 190 km (118.1 mi)

Stage 1 result

Rank	Rider	Team	Time
1	Max Sciandri (GBR)	Française des Jeux	5h 15' 04"
2	Jens Voigt (GER)	GAN	s.t.
3	Christophe Capelle (FRA)	Cofidis	+ 1' 30"

General classification after Stage 1

Rank	Rider	Team	Time
1	Jens Voigt (GER)	GAN	5h 20' 49"
2	Max Sciandri (GBR)	Française des Jeux	+ 2"
3	Chris Boardman (GBR)	GAN	+ 1' 25"

=== Stage 2 ===
9 June 1998 – Charvieu-Chavagneux to Vals-les-Bains, 198 km (123.0 mi)

Stage 2 result

Rank	Rider	Team	Time
1	Damien Nazon (FRA)	Française des Jeux	5h 03' 48"
2	Stéphane Barthe (FRA)	Casino–Ag2r	s.t.
3	Christophe Capelle (FRA)	Cofidis	s.t.

General classification after Stage 2

Rank	Rider	Team	Time
1	Jens Voigt (GER)	GAN	10h 24' 37"
2	Max Sciandri (GBR)	Française des Jeux	+ 2"
3	Christophe Moreau (FRA)	Festina–Lotus	s.t.

=== Stage 3 ===
10 June 1998 – Vals-les-Bains to Mont Ventoux, 164 km (101.9 mi)

Stage 3 result

Rank	Rider	Team	Time
1	José Maria Jimenez (ESP)	Banesto	4h 26' 28"
2	Armand de Las Cuevas (FRA)	Banesto	s.t.
3	Miguel Ángel Peña (ESP)	Banesto	+ 31"

General classification after Stage 3

Rank	Rider	Team	Time
1	Armand de Las Cuevas (FRA)	Banesto	14h 52' 45"
2	José Maria Jimenez (ESP)	Banesto	+ 18"
3	Miguel Ángel Peña (ESP)	Banesto	+ 34"

=== Stage 4 ===
11 June 1998 – Saint-Paul-Trois-Châteaux to Saint-Paul-Trois-Châteaux, 41.2 km (25.6 mi) (ITT)

Stage 4 result

Rank	Rider	Team	Time
1	Chris Boardman (GBR)	GAN	49' 39"
2	Gilles Maignan (FRA)	Mutuelle de Seine-et-Marne	+ 45"
3	Viatcheslav Ekimov (RUS)	U.S. Postal Service	+ 1' 03"

General classification after Stage 4

Rank	Rider	Team	Time
1	Armand de Las Cuevas (FRA)	Banesto	15h 45' 02"
2	Jens Voigt (GER)	GAN	+ 2"
3	Miguel Ángel Peña (ESP)	Banesto	+ 38"

=== Stage 5 ===
12 June 1998 – Crest to Grenoble, 160 km (99.4 mi)

Stage 5 result

Rank	Rider	Team	Time
1	Max Sciandri (GBR)	Française des Jeux	4h 12' 00"
2	Giovanni Lombardi (ITA)	Team Telekom	+ 1' 26"
3	Nicolas Jalabert (FRA)	Cofidis	s.t.

General classification after Stage 5

Rank	Rider	Team	Time
1	Armand de Las Cuevas (FRA)	Banesto	20h 00' 14"
2	Miguel Ángel Peña (ESP)	Banesto	+ 38"
3	Jens Voigt (GER)	GAN	+ 48"

=== Stage 6 ===
13 May 1998 – Challes-les-Eaux to Megève Côte 2000, 161 km (100.0 mi)

Stage 6 result

Rank	Rider	Team	Time
1	Richard Virenque (FRA)	Festina–Lotus	4h 47' 34"
2	Jean-Cyril Robin (FRA)	U.S. Postal Service	+ 1"
3	Rik Verbrugghe (BEL)	Lotto–Mobistar	s.t.

General classification after Stage 6

Rank	Rider	Team	Time
1	Armand de Las Cuevas (FRA)	Banesto	24h 49' 01"
2	Miguel Ángel Peña (ESP)	Banesto	+ 34"
3	Jens Voigt (GER)	GAN	+ 54"

=== Stage 7 ===
14 June 1998 – Megève to Megève, 144 km (89.5 mi)

Stage 7 result

Rank	Rider	Team	Time
1	Miguel Ángel Peña (ESP)	Banesto	3h 19' 55"
2	José Maria Jimenez (ESP)	Banesto	s.t.
3	Armand de Las Cuevas (FRA)	Banesto	s.t.

General classification after Stage 7

Rank	Rider	Team	Time
1	Armand de Las Cuevas (FRA)	Banesto	28h 08' 56"
2	Miguel Ángel Peña (ESP)	Banesto	+ 34"
3	Andrey Teteryuk (KAZ)	Lotto–Mobistar	+ 2' 17"

== General classification ==
Final general classification

Rank	Rider	Team	Time
1	Armand de Las Cuevas (FRA)	Banesto	28h 08' 56"
2	Miguel Ángel Peña (ESP)	Banesto	+ 34"
3	Andrey Teteryuk (KAZ)	Lotto–Mobistar	+ 2' 17"
4	Dariusz Baranowski (POL)	U.S. Postal Service	+ 2' 19"
5	José María Jiménez (ESP)	Banesto	+ 2' 41"
6	Richard Virenque (FRA)	Festina–Lotus	+ 2' 45"
7	Jens Voigt (GER)	GAN	+ 2' 56"
8	Thierry Bourguignon (FRA)	BigMat–Auber 93	+ 4' 13"
9	Patrick Jonker (AUS)	Rabobank	+ 4' 35"
10	Jean-Cyril Robin (FRA)	U.S. Postal Service	+ 4' 36"
