= 1997 Critérium du Dauphiné Libéré =

Race details
- Dates: 8–15 June 1997
- Stages: 7 + Prologue
- Distance: 1,186.1 km (737.0 mi)
- Winning time: 30h 49' 58"

Results
Jersey awarded to the overall winner	Winner	Udo Bölts (GER)	(Team Telekom)
	Second	Abraham Olano (ESP)	(Banesto)
	Third	Jean-Cyril Robin (FRA)	(U.S. Postal Service)
Jersey awarded to the mountains classification winner	Mountains	Udo Bölts (GER)	(Team Telekom)

The 1997 Critérium du Dauphiné Libéré was the 49th edition of the cycle race and was held from 8 June to 15 June 1997. The race started in Grenoble and finished in Chambéry. The race was won by Udo Bölts of Team Telekom.

== Teams ==
Fifteen teams, containing a total of 120 riders, participated in the race:

- Banesto
- Festina–Lotus
- Française des Jeux
- ONCE
- Casino
- GAN
- Cofidis
- Rabobank
- Team Telekom
- Lotto–Mobistar–Isoglass
- Kelme–Costa Blanca
- U.S. Postal Service
- BigMat–Auber 93
- Mutuelle de Seine-et-Marne
- Post Swiss Team

== Route ==
Stage characteristics and winners
Stage	Date	Course	Distance	Type	Winner
P	8 June	Grenoble	5.1 km (3.2 mi)	Individual time trial	Chris Boardman (GBR)
1	9 June	Grenoble to Villeurbanne	167 km (104 mi)		Djamolidine Abdoujaparov (UZB)
2	10 June	Champagne-au-Mont-d'Or to Le Puy-en-Velay	217 km (135 mi)		Viatcheslav Ekimov (RUS)
3	11 June	Le Puy-en-Velay to Beaumes-de-Venise	214 km (133 mi)		Djamolidine Abdoujaparov (UZB)
4	12 June	Bédarrides to Bédarrides	45 km (28 mi)	Individual time trial	Viatcheslav Ekimov (RUS)
5	13 June	Cavaillon to Digne-les-Bains	169 km (105 mi)		Jens Heppner (GER)
6	14 June	Digne-les-Bains to Briançon	187 km (116 mi)		Abraham Olano (ESP)
7	15 June	Briançon to Chambéry	182 km (113 mi)		Andrey Teteryuk (KAZ)

== Stages ==
=== Prologue ===
8 June 1997 – Grenoble, 5.1 km (3.2 mi) (ITT)

Prologue result and general classification after Prologue

Rank	Rider	Team	Time
1	Chris Boardman (GBR)	GAN	5' 50"
2	Alex Zülle (SUI)	ONCE	+ 3"
3	Viatcheslav Ekimov (RUS)	U.S. Postal Service	s.t.

=== Stage 1 ===
9 June 1997 – Grenoble to Villeurbanne, 167 km (103.8 mi)

Stage 1 result

Rank	Rider	Team	Time
1	Djamolidine Abdoujaparov (UZB)	GAN	4h 21' 47"
2	Giovanni Lombardi (ITA)	Team Telekom	s.t.
3	Frédéric Moncassin (FRA)	GAN	s.t.

General classification after Stage 1

Rank	Rider	Team	Time
1	Chris Boardman (GBR)	GAN	4h 27' 37"
2	Alex Zülle (SUI)	ONCE	+ 3"
3	Viatcheslav Ekimov (RUS)	U.S. Postal Service	s.t.

=== Stage 2 ===
10 June 1997 – Champagne-au-Mont-d'Or to Le Puy-en-Velay, 217 km (134.8 mi)

Stage 2 result

Rank	Rider	Team	Time
1	Viatcheslav Ekimov (RUS)	U.S. Postal Service	6h 13' 22"
2	Pascal Chanteur (FRA)	Casino	s.t.
3	Richard Virenque (FRA)	Festina–Lotus	s.t.

General classification after Stage 2

Rank	Rider	Team	Time
1	Viatcheslav Ekimov (RUS)	U.S. Postal Service	10h 35' 02"
2	Alex Zülle (SUI)	ONCE	+ 10"
3	Abraham Olano (ESP)	Banesto	+ 13"

=== Stage 3 ===
11 June 1997 – Le Puy-en-Velay to Beaumes-de-Venise, 214 km (133.0 mi)

Stage 3 result

Rank	Rider	Team	Time
1	Djamolidine Abdoujaparov (UZB)	GAN	5h 28' 08"
2	Giovanni Lombardi (ITA)	Team Telekom	s.t.
3	Damien Nazon (FRA)	Française des Jeux	s.t.

General classification after Stage 3

Rank	Rider	Team	Time
1	Viatcheslav Ekimov (RUS)	U.S. Postal Service	16h 03' 08"
2	Alex Zülle (SUI)	ONCE	+ 12"
3	Abraham Olano (ESP)	Banesto	+ 15"

=== Stage 4 ===
12 June 1997 – Bédarrides to Bédarrides, 45 km (28.0 mi) (ITT)

Stage 4 result

Rank	Rider	Team	Time
1	Viatcheslav Ekimov (RUS)	U.S. Postal Service	53' 02"
2	Abraham Olano (ESP)	Banesto	+ 33"
3	Roland Meier (SUI)	Post Swiss Team	+ 1' 26"

General classification after Stage 4

Rank	Rider	Team	Time
1	Viatcheslav Ekimov (RUS)	U.S. Postal Service	16h 56' 10"
2	Abraham Olano (ESP)	Banesto	+ 49"
3	Roland Meier (SUI)	Post Swiss Team	+ 1' 49"

=== Stage 5 ===
13 June 1997 – Cavaillon to Digne-les-Bains, 169 km (105.0 mi)

Stage 5 result

Rank	Rider	Team	Time
1	Jens Heppner (GER)	Team Telekom	4h 06' 17"
2	Javier Pascual (ESP)	Kelme–Costa Blanca	+ 50"
3	Christophe Moreau (FRA)	Festina–Lotus	+ 1' 14"

General classification after Stage 5

Rank	Rider	Team	Time
1	Viatcheslav Ekimov (RUS)	U.S. Postal Service	21h 03' 41"
2	Abraham Olano (ESP)	Banesto	+ 49"
3	Roland Meier (SUI)	Post Swiss Team	+ 1' 49"

=== Stage 6 ===
14 May 1997 – Digne-les-Bains to Briançon, 187 km (116.2 mi)

Stage 6 result

Rank	Rider	Team	Time
1	Abraham Olano (ESP)	Banesto	5h 07' 27"
2	Udo Bölts (GER)	Team Telekom	+ 1"
3	Jean-Cyril Robin (FRA)	U.S. Postal Service	+ 5"

General classification after Stage 6

Rank	Rider	Team	Time
1	Abraham Olano (ESP)	Banesto	26h 11' 57"
2	Udo Bölts (GER)	Team Telekom	+ 1' 09"
3	Michael Boogerd (NED)	Rabobank	+ 2' 17"

=== Stage 7 ===
15 June 1997 – Briançon to Chambéry, 182 km (113.1 mi)

Stage 7 result

Rank	Rider	Team	Time
1	Andrey Teteryuk (KAZ)	Lotto–Mobistar–Isoglass	4h 36' 09"
2	Davide Rebellin (ITA)	Française des Jeux	+ 43"
3	François Simon (FRA)	GAN	s.t.

General classification after Stage 7

Rank	Rider	Team	Time
1	Udo Bölts (GER)	Team Telekom	30h 49' 58"
2	Abraham Olano (ESP)	Banesto	+ 13"
3	Jean-Cyril Robin (FRA)	U.S. Postal Service	+ 1' 42"

== General classification ==
Final general classification

Rank	Rider	Team	Time
1	Udo Bölts (GER)	Team Telekom	30h 49' 58"
2	Abraham Olano (ESP)	Banesto	+ 13"
3	Jean-Cyril Robin (FRA)	U.S. Postal Service	+ 1' 42"
4	Michael Boogerd (NED)	Rabobank	+ 2' 00"
5	Andrey Teteryuk (KAZ)	Lotto–Mobistar–Isoglass	+ 4' 09"
6	François Simon (FRA)	GAN	+ 4' 12"
7	Christophe Moreau (FRA)	Festina–Lotus	+ 4' 17"
8	Viatcheslav Ekimov (RUS)	U.S. Postal Service	+ 5' 03"
9	Mikel Zarrabeitia (ESP)	ONCE	+ 6' 26"
10	Manuel Beltrán (ESP)	Banesto	+ 7' 58"
