= 1995 Critérium du Dauphiné Libéré =

Race details
- Dates: 4–11 June 1995
- Stages: 7 + Prologue
- Distance: 1,151.2 km (715.3 mi)
- Winning time: 28h 51' 32"

Results
| Jersey awarded to the overall winner | Winner | Miguel Induráin (ESP) | (Banesto) |
| | Second | Chris Boardman (GBR) | (GAN) |
| | Third | Vicente Aparicio (ESP) | (Banesto) |
| Jersey awarded to the mountains classification winner | Mountains | Richard Virenque (FRA) | (Festina–Lotus) |

The 1995 Critérium du Dauphiné Libéré was the 47th edition of the cycle race and was held from 4 June to 11 June 1995. The race started in Évian-les-Bains and finished in Chambéry. The race was won by Miguel Induráin of the Banesto team.

== Teams ==
Fourteen teams, containing a total of 109 riders, participated in the race:

- Aguardiente Antioqueño–Lotería de Medellín
- Aubervilliers 93
- Banesto
- Brescialat–Fago
- Castorama
- Chazal–König
- Collstrop–Lystec
- Festina–Lotus
- GAN
- Kelme–Sureña
- Le Groupement
- Lotto–Isoglass
- Motorola
- Mutuelle de Seine-et-Marne

== Route ==
Stage characteristics and winners
| Stage | Date | Course | Distance | Type | Stage winner |
|---|---|---|---|---|---|
| P | 4 June 1995 | Évian-les-Bains | 6.7 km (4.2 mi) | Individual time trial | Chris Boardman (GBR) |
| 1 | 5 June 1995 | Évian-les-Bains to Montalieu-Vercieu | 225 km (140 mi) | Flat stage | Andrei Tchmil (UKR) |
| 2 | 6 June 1995 | Charbonnières-les-Bains to Guilherand-Granges | 173 km (107 mi) | Flat stage | Wiebren Veenstra (NED) |
| 3 | 7 June 1995 | Tain-l'Hermitage to Tain-l'Hermitage | 36.5 km (22.7 mi) | Individual time trial | Miguel Induráin (ESP) |
| 4 | 8 June 1995 | Guilherand-Granges to Carpentras | 205 km (127 mi) | | Richard Virenque (FRA) |
| 5 | 9 June 1995 | Avignon to Gap | 198 km (123 mi) | Medium mountain stage | Gilles Talmant (FRA) |
| 6 | 10 June 1995 | Briançon to Vaujany | 143 km (89 mi) | High mountain stage | Richard Virenque (FRA) |
| 7 | 11 June 1995 | Vaujany to Chambéry | 164 km (102 mi) | | Fabian Jeker (SUI) |

== Stages ==
=== Prologue ===
4 June 1995 – Évian-les-Bains, 6.7 km (4.2 mi) (ITT)

Prologue result and general classification after Prologue

| Rank | Rider | Team | Time |
|---|---|---|---|
| 1 | Chris Boardman (GBR) | GAN | 8' 20" |
| 2 | Thierry Marie (FRA) | Castorama | + 2" |
| 3 | Miguel Induráin (ESP) | Banesto | + 10" |

=== Stage 1 ===
5 June 1995 – Évian-les-Bains to Montalieu-Vercieu, 225 km (139.8 mi)

Stage 1 result

| Rank | Rider | Team | Time |
|---|---|---|---|
| 1 | Andrei Tchmil (UKR) | Lotto–Isoglass | 5h 07' 14" |
| 2 | Miguel Induráin (ESP) | Banesto | s.t. |
| 3 | Wiebren Veenstra (NED) | Motorola | s.t. |

General classification after Stage 1

| Rank | Rider | Team | Time |
|---|---|---|---|
| 1 | Chris Boardman (GBR) | GAN | 5h 25' 34" |
| 2 | Thierry Marie (FRA) | Castorama | + 2" |
| 3 | Miguel Induráin (ESP) | Banesto | + 4" |

=== Stage 2 ===
6 June 1995 – Charbonnières-les-Bains to Guilherand-Granges, 173 km (107.5 mi)

Stage 2 result

| Rank | Rider | Team | Time |
|---|---|---|---|
| 1 | Wiebren Veenstra (NED) | Motorola | 4h 12' 26" |
| 2 | Mauro Radaelli (ITA) | Brescialat–Fago | s.t. |
| 3 | Gabriele Missaglia (ITA) | Brescialat–Fago | + 1" |

General classification after Stage 2

| Rank | Rider | Team | Time |
|---|---|---|---|
| 1 | Chris Boardman (GBR) | GAN | 9h 38' 01" |
| 2 | Thierry Marie (FRA) | Castorama | + 1" |
| 3 | Miguel Induráin (ESP) | Banesto | + 4" |

=== Stage 3 ===
7 June 1995 – Tain-l'Hermitage to Tain-l'Hermitage, 36.5 km (22.7 mi) (ITT)

Stage 3 result

| Rank | Rider | Team | Time |
|---|---|---|---|
| 1 | Miguel Induráin (ESP) | Banesto | 44' 41" |
| 2 | Chris Boardman (GBR) | GAN | + 1' 08" |
| 2 | Thierry Marie (FRA) | Castorama | + 1' 55" |

General classification after Stage 3

| Rank | Rider | Team | Time |
|---|---|---|---|
| 1 | Miguel Induráin (ESP) | Banesto | 10h 22' 46" |
| 2 | Chris Boardman (GBR) | GAN | + 1' 04" |
| 3 | Thierry Marie (FRA) | Castorama | + 1' 52" |

=== Stage 4 ===
8 June 1995 – Guilherand-Granges to Carpentras, 205 km (127.4 mi)

Stage 4 result

| Rank | Rider | Team | Time |
|---|---|---|---|
| 1 | Richard Virenque (FRA) | Festina–Lotus | 5h 07' 44" |
| 2 | Álvaro Mejía (COL) | Motorola | s.t. |
| 2 | Miguel Induráin (ESP) | Banesto | s.t. |

General classification after Stage 4

| Rank | Rider | Team | Time |
|---|---|---|---|
| 1 | Miguel Induráin (ESP) | Banesto | 15h 30' 30" |
| 2 | Chris Boardman (GBR) | GAN | + 2' 21" |
| 3 | Vicente Aparicio (ESP) | Banesto | + 3' 39" |

=== Stage 5 ===
9 June 1995 – Avignon to Gap, 198 km (123.0 mi)

Stage 5 result

| Rank | Rider | Team | Time |
|---|---|---|---|
| 1 | Gilles Talmant (FRA) | Castorama | 5h 00' 44" |
| 2 | Jean-Cyril Robin (FRA) | Castorama | s.t. |
| 2 | José Arrieta (ESP) | Banesto | s.t. |

General classification after Stage 5

| Rank | Rider | Team | Time |
|---|---|---|---|
| 1 | Miguel Induráin (ESP) | Banesto | 20h 32' 39" |
| 2 | Chris Boardman (GBR) | GAN | + 2' 21" |
| 3 | Vicente Aparicio (ESP) | Banesto | + 3' 39" |

=== Stage 6 ===
10 May 1995 – Briançon to Vaujany, 143 km (88.9 mi)

Stage 6 result

| Rank | Rider | Team | Time |
|---|---|---|---|
| 1 | Richard Virenque (FRA) | Festina–Lotus | 4h 15' 22" |
| 2 | Jean-Cyril Robin (FRA) | Castorama | s.t. |
| 2 | Miguel Induráin (ESP) | Banesto | s.t. |

General classification after Stage 6

| Rank | Rider | Team | Time |
|---|---|---|---|
| 1 | Miguel Induráin (ESP) | Banesto | 24h 48' 01" |
| 2 | Chris Boardman (GBR) | GAN | + 2' 21" |
| 3 | Vicente Aparicio (ESP) | Banesto | + 3' 39" |

=== Stage 7 ===
11 June 1995 – Vaujany to Chambéry, 164 km (101.9 mi)

Stage 7 result

| Rank | Rider | Team | Time |
|---|---|---|---|
| 1 | Fabian Jeker (SUI) | Festina–Lotus | 4h 03' 31" |
| 2 | Chris Boardman (GBR) | GAN | s.t. |
| 2 | Richard Virenque (FRA) | Festina–Lotus | s.t. |

General classification after Stage 7

| Rank | Rider | Team | Time |
|---|---|---|---|
| 1 | Miguel Induráin (ESP) | Banesto | 28h 51' 32" |
| 2 | Chris Boardman (GBR) | GAN | + 2' 21" |
| 2 | Vicente Aparicio (ESP) | Banesto | + 3' 39" |

== General classification ==
Final general classification

| Rank | Rider | Team | Time |
|---|---|---|---|
| 1 | Miguel Induráin (ESP) | Banesto | 28h 51' 32" |
| 2 | Chris Boardman (GBR) | GAN | + 2' 21" |
| 3 | Vicente Aparicio (ESP) | Banesto | + 3' 39" |
| 4 | Richard Virenque (FRA) | Festina–Lotus | + 3' 54" |
| 5 | Jean-Cyril Robin (FRA) | Festina–Lotus | + 4' 06" |
| 6 | Carmelo Miranda (ESP) | Banesto | + 6' 43" |
| 7 | Miguel Arroyo (MEX) | Chazal–König | + 7' 21" |
| 8 | Álvaro Mejía (COL) | Motorola | + 8' 20" |
| 9 | Andrea Peron (ITA) | Motorola | + 9' 22" |
| 10 | Thierry Laurent (FRA) | Castorama | + 9' 22" |
