= 2000 Tour Down Under =

2nd edition of the Tour Down Under stage race

Race details
- Dates: 18–23 January 2000
- Stages: 6
- Distance: 776.2 km (482.3 mi)
- Winning time: 19h 02' 02"

Results
Jersey awarded to the overall winner	Winner	Gilles Maignan (FRA)	(AG2R Prévoyance)
	Second	Stuart O'Grady (AUS)	(Crédit Agricole)
	Third	Steffen Wesemann (GER)	(Team Telekom)
Jersey awarded to the points classification winner	Points	Guillaume Auger (FRA)	(BigMat–Auber 93)
Jersey awarded to the mountains classification winner	Mountains	René Jørgensen (DEN)	(Memory Card–Jack & Jones)
Jersey awarded to the young rider classification winner	Young rider	Sandy Casar (FRA)	(Française des Jeux)
	Team	AG2R Prévoyance	

The 2000 Tour Down Under was the second edition of the Tour Down Under stage race. It took place from 18 to 23 January in and around Adelaide, South Australia. The race was won by French rider Gilles Maignan, who rode for AG2R Prévoyance.

== Teams ==
- Linda McCartney Racing Team
- UniSA–Australia
- Team Telekom
- Crédit Agricole
- United Water–AIS
- Farm Frites
- AG2R Prévoyance
- Française des Jeux
- Team Polti
- Sun-Smart–Mitsubishi
- Memory Card–Jack & Jones
- BigMat–Auber 93
- Saeco–Valli & Valli

== Route and stages ==
Stage	Date	Route	Distance	Winner	Nation	Team
1	18 January	Adelaide	52.2 km (32.4 mi)	Koos Moerenhout	Netherlands	Farm Frites
2	19 January	North Adelaide – Goolwa	152 km (94 mi)	Michael Rogers	Australia	United Water–AIS
3	20 January	Glenelg – McLaren Vale	149.5 km (92.9 mi)	Stéphane Bergès	France	BigMat–Auber 93
4	21 January	City of Unley – Modbury	136 km (85 mi)	Steffen Wesemann	Germany	Team Telekom
5	22 January	Gawler – Tanunda	156 km (97 mi)	Erik Zabel	Germany	Team Telekom
6	23 January	Adelaide	96 km (60 mi)	Robbie McEwen	Australia	Farm Frites
Total			776.2 km (482.3 mi)			

== Final classification ==
Result
Rank	Rider	Team	Time
1	Gilles Maignan (FRA)	AG2R Prévoyance	19h 02' 02"
2	Stuart O'Grady (AUS)	Crédit Agricole	+ 12"
3	Steffen Wesemann (GER)	Team Telekom	+ 14"
4	Ludovic Turpin (FRA)	AG2R Prévoyance	+ 18"
5	Sandy Casar (FRA)	Française des Jeux	+ 24"
6	Dominique Rault (FRA)	BigMat–Auber 93	+ 25"
7	Alexander Vinokourov (KAZ)	Team Telekom	+ 28"
8	Matthew Stephens (GBR)	Linda McCartney Racing Team	+ 4' 11"
9	René Jørgensen (DEN)	Memory Card–Jack & Jones	+ 5' 46"
10	Emmanuel Magnien (FRA)	Française des Jeux	+ 10' 58"
