= Mutuelle de Seine-et-Marne =

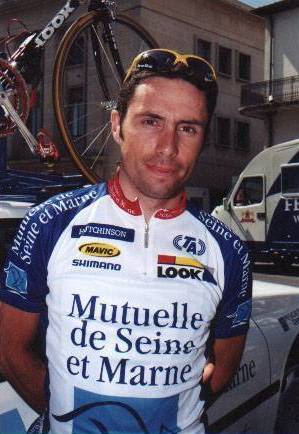
- David Delrieu riding for the team in 1998

Team information
- UCI code: MUT
- Registered: France
- Founded: 1995
- Disbanded: 1998
- Discipline: Road

Team name history
- 1995–1998: Mutuelle de Seine-et-Marne

Mutuelle de Seine-et-Marne was a French cycling team that existed from 1995 to 1998. The team participated in the 1997 Tour de France after being given a wildcard.

== List of riders ==
Name	Birth date	Nationality	Joined	Left
Jean-François Anti	13/02/1971	France	1995	1997
Lauri Aus	04/11/1970	Estonia	1995	1996
Jérôme Bernard	21/09/1971	France	1998	1998
Fabrice Blévin	15/04/1970	France	1996	1997
Blaise Chauvière	16/01/1971	France	1995	1997
Stéphane Cueff	14/10/1969	France	1995	1998
Laurent Davion	29/02/1972	France	1996	1996
David Delrieu	20/02/1971	France	1996	1998
Jean-Philippe Dojwa	07/08/1967	France	1997	1998
Gordon Fraser	19/11/1968	Canada	1997	1997
Frédéric Gabriel	20/07/1970	France	1995	1998
Charles Guilbert	15/05/1972	France	1995	1998
Nicolas Jalabert	13/04/1973	France	1995	1996
Claude Lamour	18/10/1969	France	1995	1998
Franck Laurance	18/04/1970	France	1995	1996
Gilles Maignan	30/07/1970	France	1995	1998
Laurent Pillon	31/03/1964	France	1995	1998
Dominique Rault	02/06/1971	France	1997	1998
Christophe Rinero	29/12/1973	France	1996	1996
Steve Rover	29/08/1973	Canada	1997	1998
Gilles Talmant	27/04/1970	France	1998	1998
Francisque Teyssier	02/01/1969	France	1998	1998
