= Petrovice (Třebíč District) =

- Municipality
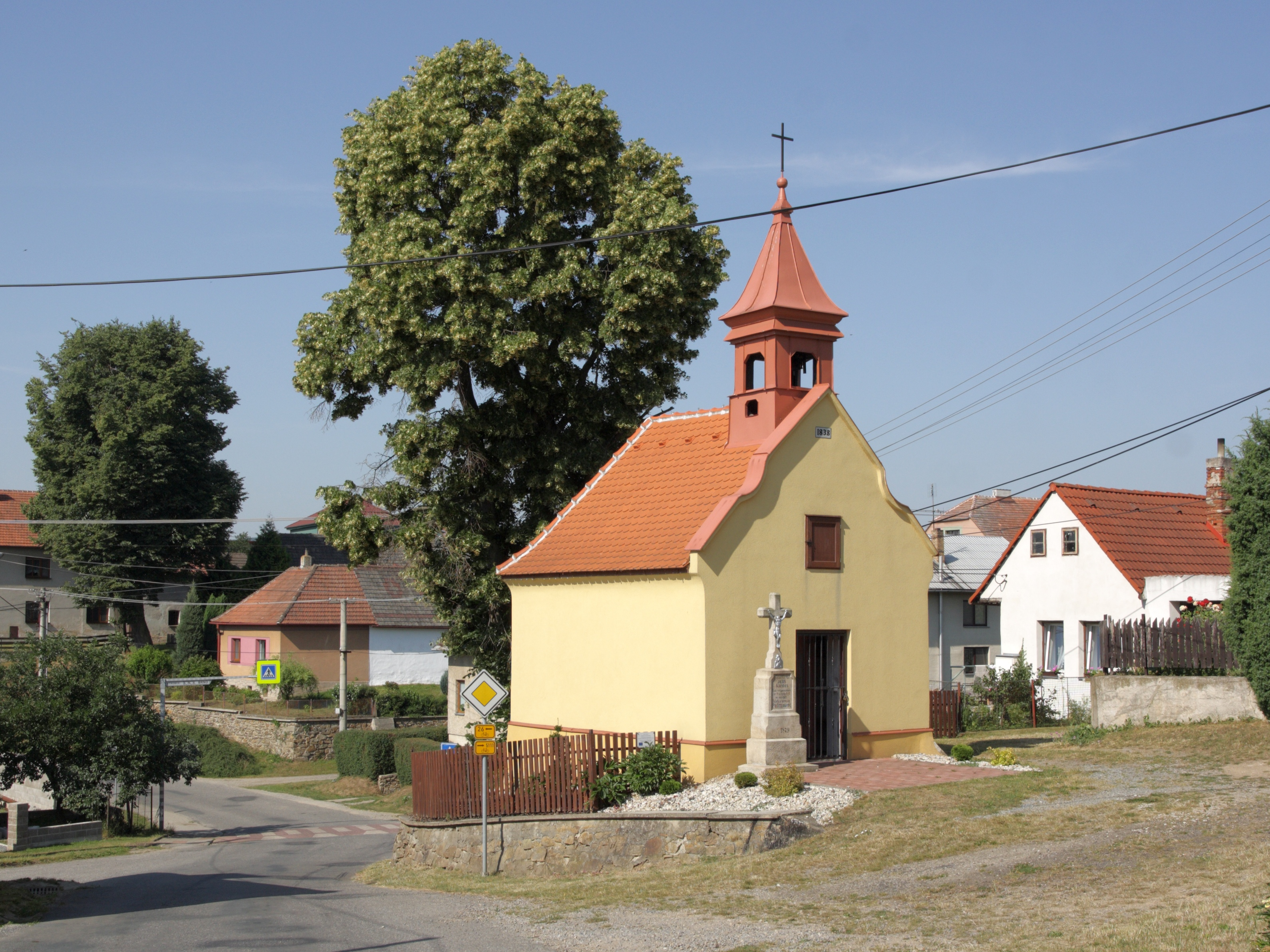
- Chapel in the centre of Petrovice

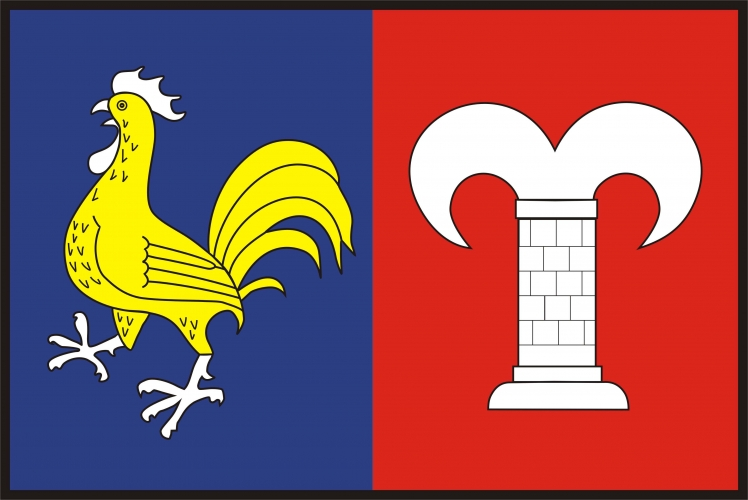
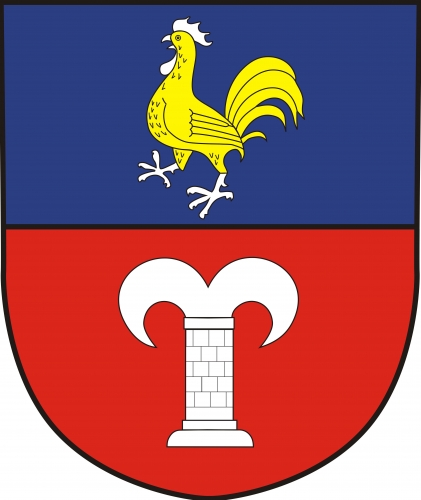
- Flag Coat of arms

- Location in the Czech Republic
- Coordinates: 49°14′28″N 15°47′15″E
- Country: Czech Republic
- Region: Vysočina
- District: Třebíč
- First mentioned: 1224

Area
  - Total: 6.19 km^{2} (2.39 sq mi)
- Elevation: 438 m (1,437 ft)

Population (2026-01-01)
  - Total: 414
  - Density: 66.9/km^{2} (173/sq mi)
- Time zone: UTC+1 (CET)
  - Summer (DST): UTC+2 (CEST)
- Postal code: 675 21
- Website: www.petroviceutrebice.cz

Petrovice is a municipality and village in Třebíč District in the Vysočina Region of the Czech Republic. It has about 400 inhabitants.

Petrovice lies approximately 8 kilometres (5 mi) west of Třebíč, 23 km (14 mi) south-east of Jihlava, and 137 km (85 mi) south-east of Prague.

== Demographics ==
Historical population
Year	Pop.	±%
1869	373	—
1880	417	+11.8%
1890	422	+1.2%
1900	439	+4.0%
1910	448	+2.1%
1921	509	+13.6%
1930	693	+36.1%
1950	700	+1.0%
1961	482	−31.1%
1970	447	−7.3%
1980	457	+2.2%
1991	423	−7.4%
2001	403	−4.7%
2011	416	+3.2%
2021	399	−4.1%
Source: Censuses

== Notable people ==
- Pavel Padrnos (born 1970), road racing cyclist
