= Giusvan Piovaccari =

Italian cyclist

Personal information
- Born: 7 September 1973 (age 53)

Cycling career
- Sport: Cycling
- Role: Rider

Giusvan Piovaccari (born 7 September 1973) is an Italian racing cyclist. He rode in the 1997 Tour de France.
