= Philipp Buschor =

Swiss cyclist

Personal information
- Born: 12 March 1971 (age 55)

Cycling career
- Sport: Cycling
- Role: Rider

Philipp Buschor (born 12 March 1971) is a Swiss racing cyclist. He rode in the 1997 Tour de France.
