= Daniele Sgnaolin =

Italian cyclist

Personal information
- Born: 22 November 1970 (age 55) San Donà di Piave, Italy

Cycling career
- Sport: Cycling
- Discipline: Road
- Role: Rider

Professional team
- 1996–1997: Roslotto–ZG Mobili

Daniele Sgnaolin (born 22 November 1970) is an Italian former racing cyclist. He rode in the 1996 Giro d'Italia and the 1997 Tour de France.

== Major results ==
1991
2nd Trofeo Città di San Vendemiano
1993
1st Coppa Collecchio
1995
1st Stage 3 Giro delle Regioni
2nd Overall Giro Ciclistico d'Italia

1st Stage 7
