= David Delrieu =

French cyclist

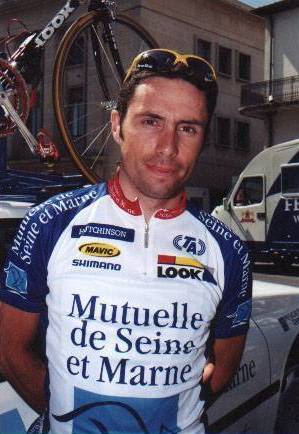

Personal information
- Born: 20 February 1971 (age 55) Aurillac, France

Cycling career
- Sport: Cycling
- Current team: Retired
- Discipline: Road
- Role: Rider
- Rider type: Climber

Amateur teams
- 1990–1994: UC Aulnat-Sayat
- 1995–1996: Côtes d'Armor

Professional teams
- 1996–1998: Mutuelle de Seine-et-Marne
- 1999–2001: Casino–Ag2r Prévoyance

David Delrieu (born 20 February 1971 in Aurillac) is a French former cyclist.

== Palmares ==
1996
1st Overall Tour de l'Ain

1st Stage 5

1st Overall Mi-Août Bretonne
1st Overall Boucles de la Mayenne
1st Stage 11 Tour de l'Avenir
2001
2nd Overall Tour de l'Ain

1st Stage 5
