= Nicolas Jalabert =

French cyclist

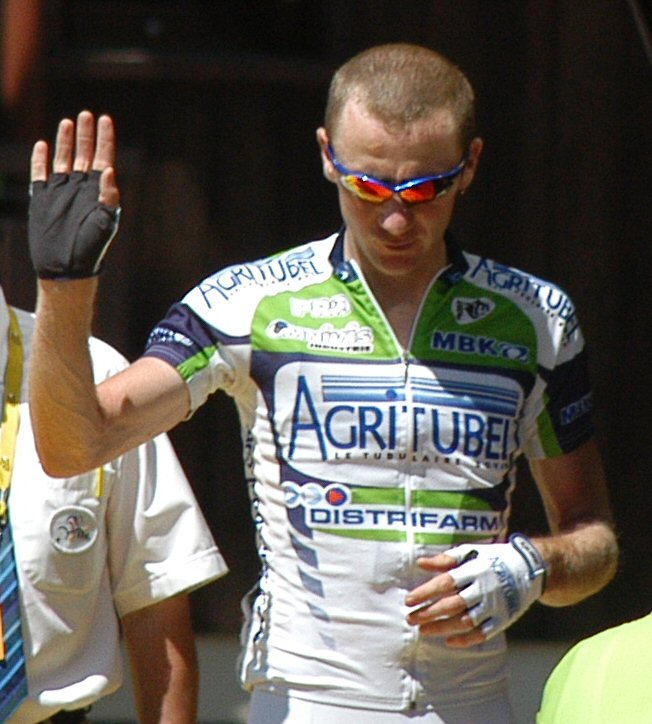

Personal information
- Full name: Nicolas Jalabert
- Born: 13 April 1973 (age 53) Mazamet, France
- Height: 1.74 m (5 ft 8 1/2 in)
- Weight: 68 kg (150 lb; 10 st 10 lb)

Cycling career
- Sport: Cycling
- Current team: Retired
- Role: Rider

Professional teams
- 1993–1994: ONCE
- 1995–1996: Mutuelle de Seine-et-Marne
- 1997–1999: Cofidis
- 2000: ONCE–Deutsche Bank
- 2001–2003: CSC–Tiscali
- 2004–2006: Phonak
- 2007–2009: Agritubel

Nicolas Jalabert (born 13 April 1973) is a French former road racing cyclist. In 1997 he turned professional with the French team Cofidis. He is the younger brother of Laurent Jalabert, and followed him to ONCE in 2000 and Team CSC in 2001. In 2004, after his brother's retirement, he followed Tyler Hamilton to Phonak. When the Phonak team disbanded after the 2006 season, Jalabert moved to Agritubel.

== Major results ==
1995
1st Mi-Août Bretonne
7th Overall Tour de l'Avenir
1996
1st GP de la Ville de Rennes
1st Stage 3 Tour de l'Avenir
4th Overall Circuit Cycliste Sarthe
5th Classic Haribo
1997
1st Route Adélie
1st GP de la Ville de Rennes
6th Paris–Bourges
10th GP Ouest-France
1998
6th Overall KBC Driedaagse van De Panne-Koksijde
10th Trophée des Grimpeurs
1999
5th Paris–Bourges
9th Tour de Vendée
2000
1st Stage 1 Volta a Catalunya (TTT)
2001
3rd GP Rik Van Steenbergen
5th Overall 4 Jours de Dunkerque
7th Overall Danmark Rundt
2002
1st Bordeaux-Caudéran
2nd Road race, National Road Championships
3rd Overall Tour du Poitou Charentes et de la Vienne

1st Stage 2

6th Overall Tour de Picardie
7th Grand Prix d'Isbergues
9th Classic Haribo
2003
1st Overall Niedersachsen-Rundfahrt
3rd GP Ouest-France
7th Overall Tour de Picardie
9th Overall Tour of Qatar
9th Overall 4 Jours de Dunkerque
9th Road race, National Road Championships
9th Rund um den Henninger Turm
2005
2nd Bordeaux-Caudéran
3rd Road race, National Road Championships
2006
7th Road race, National Road Championships
8th Overall Tour of Qatar
2007
1st Classic Loire Atlantique
5th Road race, National Road Championships
7th Paris–Camembert
2008
4th Overall Étoile de Bessèges
6th Omloop Het Volk
6th Grand Prix de Plumelec-Morbihan
9th Kuurne–Brussels–Kuurne
2009
2nd Les Boucles du Sud Ardèche
2nd Trophée Des Champions
3rd Trophée des Grimpeurs
5th Overall Tour de Normandie
5th Tour du Finistère
6th Overall Tour de Wallonie
10th Road race, National Road Championships
