= Stéphane Cueff =

French cyclist

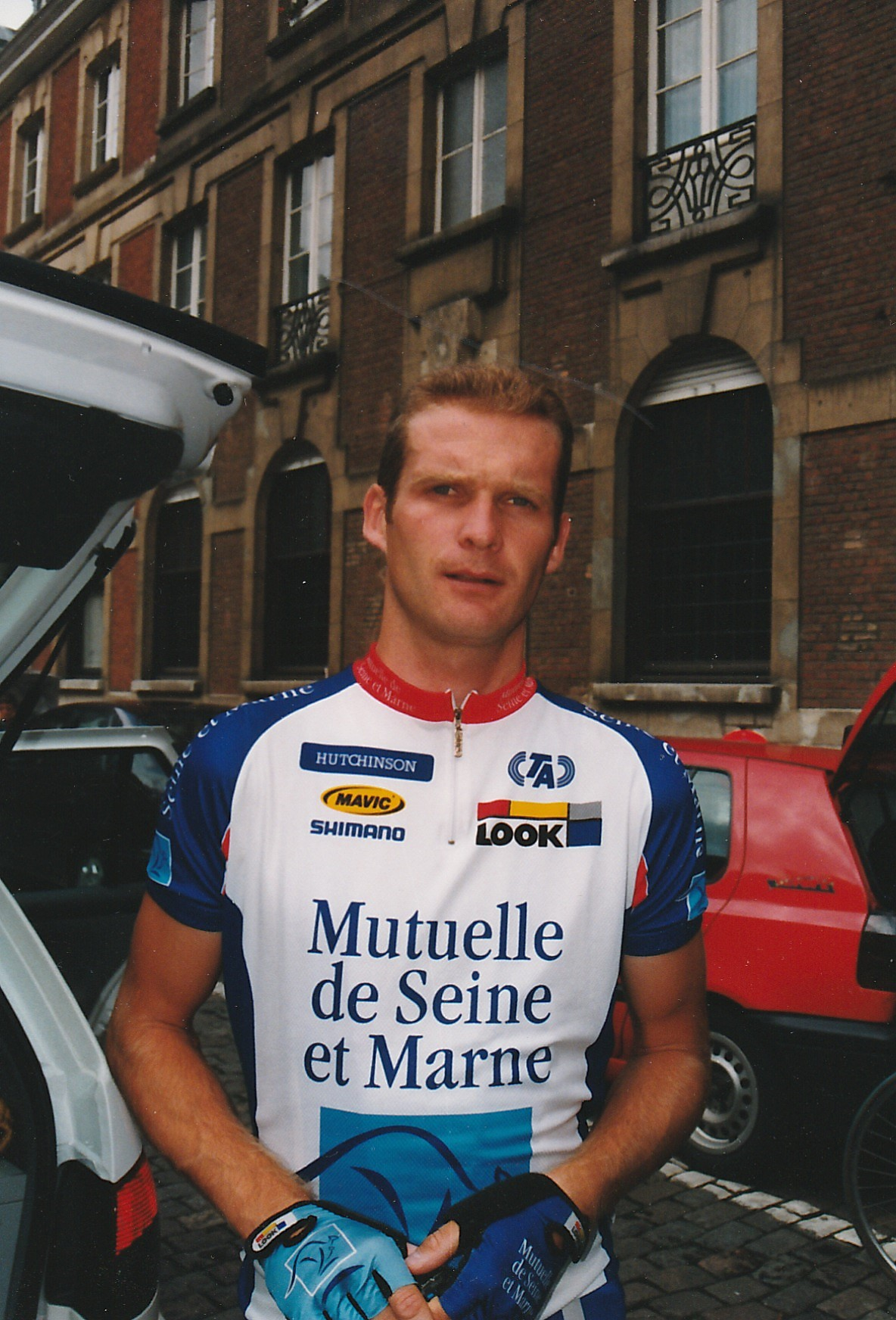

Personal information
- Born: 14 October 1969 (age 57) Landivisiau, France

Cycling career
- Sport: Cycling
- Current team: Retired
- Discipline: Road
- Role: Rider

Amateur teams
- 1990: VS Scaër
- 1991–1993: US Créteil

Professional teams
- 1995–1998: Mutuelle de Seine-et-Marne
- 1999: Home Market–Ville de Charleroi

Stéphane Cueff (born 14 October 1969) is a French former professional racing cyclist. He rode in the 1997 Tour de France.

== Major results ==
1991
2nd Paris–Roubaix Espoirs
1992
3rd Liège–Bastogne–Liège U23
1996
1st Overall Ruban Granitier Breton

1st Stage 7 (ITT)

1997
3rd Grand Prix de la Ville de Lillers
1998
1st Grand Prix d'Isbergues
9th Grand Prix de Fourmies
