= Grand Prix de Rennes =

Bicycle race held in Rennes, France

Race details
- Date: Early April
- Region: Rennes, France
- English name: Grand Prix of Rennes
- Local name: Grand Prix Cycliste de la Ville de Rennes (in French)
- Discipline: Road
- Competition: UCI Europe Tour
- Type: Single-day

History
- First edition: 1979
- Editions: 30
- Final edition: 2008
- First winner: Yvon Bertin (FRA)
- Final winner: Mikhaylo Khalilov (UKR)

Grand Prix Cycliste de la Ville de Rennes was a professional cycle road race held in Rennes, France until 2008 when it was last organised, with the organisers citing financial difficulties as the reason. Since 2005 the race was organized as a 1.1 event on the UCI Europe Tour, also being part of the Coupe de France de cyclisme sur route.

== Winners ==
Year	Country	Rider	Team
1979	France	Yvon Bertin	
1980	France	Bernard Vallet	
1981	France	Jean Chassang	
1982	France	Jean-François Rault	
1983	France	Dominique Arnaud	
1984	France	Bruno Wojtinek	
1985	France	Gilbert Duclos-Lassalle	
1986	France	Éric Boyer	
1987	France	Jean-François Bernard	
1988	France	Ronan Pensec	
1989	Belgium	Jan Bogaert	
1990	Belgium	Edwin Bafcop	
1991	Denmark	Kim Andersen	
1992	France	Jean-Cyril Robin	
1993	France	Eddy Seigneur	
1994	France	Gilles Delion	
1995	Belgium	Peter De Clercq	
1996	France	Nicolas Jalabert	
1997	France	Nicolas Jalabert	
1998	France	Pascal Chanteur	
1999	Netherlands	Max Van Heeswijk	
2000	Canada	Gordon Fraser	
2001	Italy	Davide Casarotto	
2002	United States	Kirk O'Bee	
2003	Russia	Oleg Grischkin	
2004	Estonia	Andrus Aug	
2005	France	Ludovic Turpin	
2006	Italy	Paride Grillo	
2007	Ukraine	Sergiy Matveyev	
2008	Ukraine	Mikhaylo Khalilov	
