= Jean-Cyril Robin =

French cyclist (born 1969)

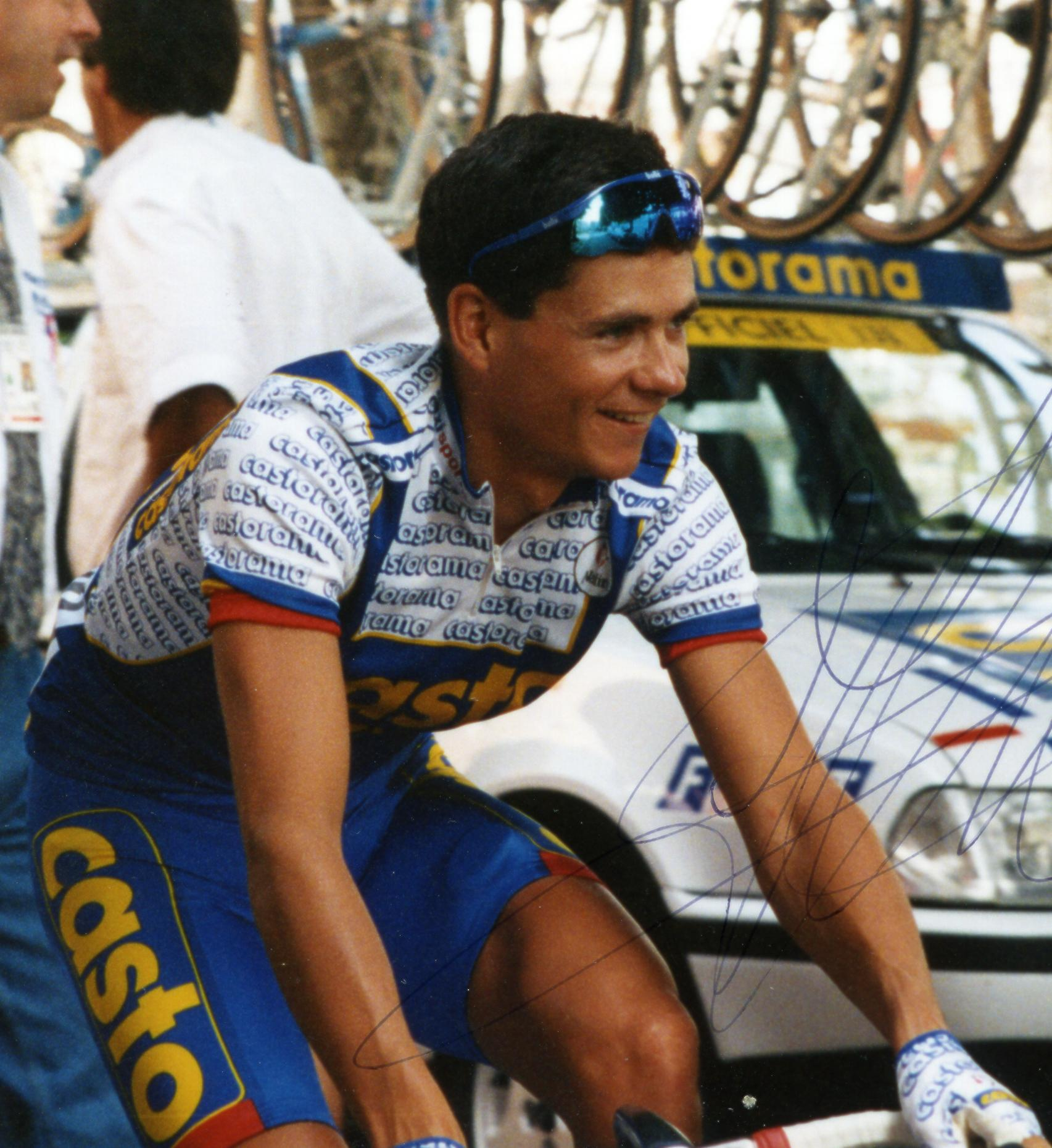
- Robin at the 1993 Tour de France

Personal information
- Full name: Jean-Cyril Robin
- Born: 27 August 1969 (age 57) Lannion, France
- Height: 1.80 m (5 ft 11 in)
- Weight: 63 kg (139 lb; 9 st 13 lb)

Cycling career
- Sport: Cycling
- Current team: Retired
- Discipline: Road

Professional teams
- 1991–1994: Castorama–Raleigh
- 1995–1996: Festina–Lotus
- 1997–1998: U.S. Postal Service
- 1999: Française des Jeux
- 2000–2001: Bonjour
- 2002–2004: Française des Jeux
Medal record
Representing France
Men's road bicycle racing
World Championships
Bronze medal – third place	1999 Verona	Elite Men's Road Race

Jean-Cyril Robin (born 27 August 1969) is a French former professional road racing cyclist.

== Major results ==
1987
1st Road race, National Junior Road Championships
8th Junior road race, UCI World Road Championships
1990
1st Boucles de la Mayenne
1st Stage 4 Tour du Limousin
1991
3rd Overall Tour d'Armorique
8th Chrono des Herbiers
8th Trophée des Grimpeurs
1992
1st Grand Prix de Rennes
1st Stage 3 Tour d'Armorique
3rd Cholet-Pays de Loire
5th Overall Tour Méditerranéen
6th Overall Tour du Limousin
6th Trophée des Grimpeurs
7th Tour de Vendée
1993
1st Overall Tour d'Armorique

1st Stage 1

1st Route Adélie de Vitré
3rd Classique des Alpes
1994
4th Overall Circuit Cycliste Sarthe
9th GP de la Ville de Rennes
1995
1st Stage 5 Four Days of Dunkirk
5th Overall Route du Sud
5th Overall Critérium du Dauphiné Libéré
5th Trophée des Grimpeurs
8th Japan Cup Cycle Road Race
8th Overall Tour de l'Oise
8th Overall Grand Prix du Midi Libre
1996
5th Overall Tour DuPont
9th Overall Giro d'Italia
1997
3rd Overall Critérium du Dauphiné Libéré
5th Overall Tour du Limousin
1998
4th Overall Tour of Galicia
6th Overall Tour de France
8th Trophée des Grimpeurs
9th Overall Volta a Catalunya
9th Classique des Alpes
10th Overall Critérium du Dauphiné Libéré
1999
2nd Overall Tour du Poitou-Charentes

1st Stage 1

2nd Overall Tour Trans-Canada

1st Stage 4

2nd Prix des Bles d'Or, Mi-Août en Bretagne
3rd Road race, UCI Road World Championships
4th Giro dell'Emilia
4th Cholet-Pays de Loire
5th Road race, National Road Championships
8th Overall Route du Sud
10th Milano–Torino
2000
1st Prix du Léon
2nd Overall Tour du Limousin
2nd Tour du Finistère
6th GP Ouest France-Plouay
6th Grand Prix d'Isbergues
10th Paris–Bourges
2001
2nd Tour du Finistère
4th Boucles de l'Aulne
6th Grand Prix d'Isbergues
7th Paris–Bourges
2002
6th Classique des Alpes
8th Overall 4 Jours de Dunkerque
9th Overall Route du Sud
2003
6th Boucles de l'Aulne

=== Grand Tour general classification results timeline ===
Grand Tour	1992	1993	1994	1995	1996	1997	1998	1999	2000	2001	2002	2003	2004
/ Vuelta a España	—	—	—	DNF	—	DNF	DNF	—	—	—	—	—	—
Giro d'Italia	—	—	—	42	—	9	—	—	—	DNF	—	—	—
Tour de France	44	DNF	—	22	DNF	15	6	52	19	56	32	—	47

Legend
—	Did not compete
DNF	Did not finish
