= Massimiliano Napolitano =

Italian cyclist

Personal information
- Born: 13 March 1973 (age 53)

Cycling career
- Sport: Cycling
- Role: Rider

Massimiliano Napolitano (born 13 March 1973) is an Italian racing cyclist. He rode in the 1999 Tour de France.
