= Vitali Kokorine =

Russian cyclist

Personal information
- Born: 3 January 1975 (age 51)

Cycling career
- Sport: Cycling
- Role: Rider

Vitali Kokorine (born 3 January 1975) is a Russian racing cyclist. He rode in the 1997 Tour de France and Giro d'Italia 2000

== Teams ==
1997	(Italy)	Roslotto - ZG (Italy)
1998	(Italy)	Saeco - Cannondale (Italy)
1999	(Italy)	Saeco - Cannondale (Italy)
2000	(Italy)	Amica Chips - Tacconi (Italy)
2001	(Slovakia)	De Nardi - Pasta Montegrappa (Slovakia)
2002	(Slovakia)	De Nardi - Pasta Montegrappa (Slovakia)

== Results ==
1993

(Italy)	1º in General Classification Giro della Lunigiana, Juniors, Italy

1994

(South Africa)	2º in Stage 8 Rapport Toer, Tafelberg (Eastern Cape), South Africa

1995

(Italy)	3º in Young rider classification Giro delle Regioni, Italy
(Italy)	1º in GP d'Europa, (Ravenna), Bergamo (Lombardia), Italy

1996

(Italy)	1º in GP di Poggiana, (Poggiana), Poggiana (Veneto), Italy
(Italy)	3º in GP d'Europa, (Ravenna), Ravenna (Emilia-Romagna), Italy
(Italy)	1º in Coppa Apollo 17, (Colbuccaro), Colbuccaro (Marche), Italy
(Italy)	1º in General Classification Giro Ciclistico Pesche Nettarine di Romagna, Italy
(Italy)	1º in Gran Premio Città di Empoli, (Empoli), Empoli (Toscana), Italy
(Italy)	1º in Trofeo Remo Puntoni, (San Salvatore), San Salvatore (Liguria), Italy

1997 - Le Tour de France

(France)	105º in Prologue Tour de France, Rouen (Haute-Normandie), France
(France)	111º in Stage 1 Tour de France, Forges-les-Eaux (Haute-Normandie), France
(France)	181º in Stage 2 Tour de France, Vire (Basse-Normandie), France
(France)	109º in Stage 3 Tour de France, Plumelec (Bretagne), France
(France)	166º in Stage 4 Tour de France, Le Puy (Aquitaine), France
(France)	26º in Stage 5 Tour de France, La Chatie (Limousin), France
(France)	143º in Stage 6 Tour de France, Marennes (Poitou-Charentes), France
(France)	176º in Stage 7 Tour de France, Bordeaux (Aquitaine), France
(France)	179º in Stage 8 Tour de France, Pau (Aquitaine), France
(France)	98º in Stage 9 Tour de France, Loudenvielle (Midi-Pyrenees), France
(France)	135º in Stage 10 Tour de France, Andorre (Andorra la Vella), Andorra

1999

(Russia)	7º in National Championship, Road, Elite, Russia, Nizhni Novgorod (Nizhegorod), Russia
(Germany)	2º in Stage 2 Regio Tour International, Müllheim (Baden-Wurttemberg), Germany

2000 - Giro d'Italia

(Italy)	107º in Prologue Ronde van Italië, (Giro d'Italia), Roma (Lazio), Italy
(Italy)	62º in Stage 1 Ronde van Italië, (Giro d'Italia), Terracina (Lazio), Italy
(Italy)	114º in Stage 2 Ronde van Italië, (Giro d'Italia), Maddaloni (Campania), Italy
(Italy)	47º in Stage 3 Ronde van Italië, (Giro d'Italia), Scalea (Calabria), Italy
(Italy)	18º in Stage 4 Ronde van Italië, (Giro d'Italia), Matera (Basilicata), Italy
(Italy)	64º in Stage 5 Ronde van Italië, (Giro d'Italia), Peschici (Puglia), Italy
(Italy)	41º in Stage 6 Ronde van Italië, (Giro d'Italia), Vasto (Abruzzi), Italy
(Italy)	102º in Stage 7 Ronde van Italië, (Giro d'Italia), Teramo (Abruzzi), Italy
(Italy)	20º in Stage 8 Ronde van Italië, (Giro d'Italia), Prato (Toscana), Italy
(Italy)	73º in Stage 9 Ronde van Italië, (Giro d'Italia), Abetone (Toscana), Italy
(Italy)	47º in Stage 10 Ronde van Italië, (Giro d'Italia), Padova (Veneto), Italy
(Italy)	127º in Stage 11 Ronde van Italië, (Giro d'Italia), Bibione (Veneto), Italy
(Italy)	81º in Stage 12 Ronde van Italië, (Giro d'Italia), Feltre (Veneto), Italy
(Italy)	121º in Stage 13 Ronde van Italië, (Giro d'Italia), Italy
(Italy)	101º in Stage 14 Ronde van Italië, (Giro d'Italia), Bormio (Lombardia), Italy
(Italy)	100º in Stage 15 Ronde van Italië, (Giro d'Italia), Brescia (Lombardia), Italy
(Italy)	114º in Stage 16 Ronde van Italië, (Giro d'Italia), Meda (Lombardia), Italy
(Italy)	33º in Stage 17 Ronde van Italië, (Giro d'Italia), Genoa (Liguria), Italy
(Italy)	38º in Stage 18 Ronde van Italië, (Giro d'Italia), Prato Nevoso (Piemonte), Italy
(Italy)	19º in Stage 19 Ronde van Italië, (Giro d'Italia), Briançon (Provence-Alpes-Cote d'Azur), France
(Italy)	89º in Stage 20 Ronde van Italië, (Giro d'Italia), Sestrières (Piemonte), Italy
(Italy)	111º in Stage 21 Ronde van Italië, (Giro d'Italia), Milano (Lombardia), Italy

51º in General Classification Ronde van Italië, (Giro d'Italia), Italy
