= Jean-François Anti =

French cyclist

Personal information
- Born: 13 February 1971 (age 55) Villeneuve-Saint-Georges, Frances

Cycling career
- Sport: Cycling
- Role: Rider

Jean-François Anti (French pronunciation: [ʒɑ̃ fʁɑ̃swa ɑ̃ti], born 13 February 1971) is a French racing cyclist. He rode in the 1997 Tour de France.
