= Grand Prix d'Isbergues =

French one-day road cycling race

Race details
- Date: Mid September
- Region: Isbergues, France
- English name: Grand Prix of Isbergues
- Local name: Grand Prix d'Isbergues (in French)
- Discipline: Road
- Competition: UCI Europe Tour
- Type: Single-day
- Web site: www.gpisbergues.com

History
- First edition: 1947
- Editions: 80 (as of 2026)
- First winner: Eugène Dupuis (FRA)
- Most wins: 6 riders with 2 wins
- Most recent: Olav Kooij (NED)

Grand Prix d'Isbergues is a professional cycle road race held in Isbergues, Pas-de-Calais. Since 2005, the race has been organised as a 1.1 event on the UCI Europe Tour. A women's race was added in 2018 as a 1.2 event.

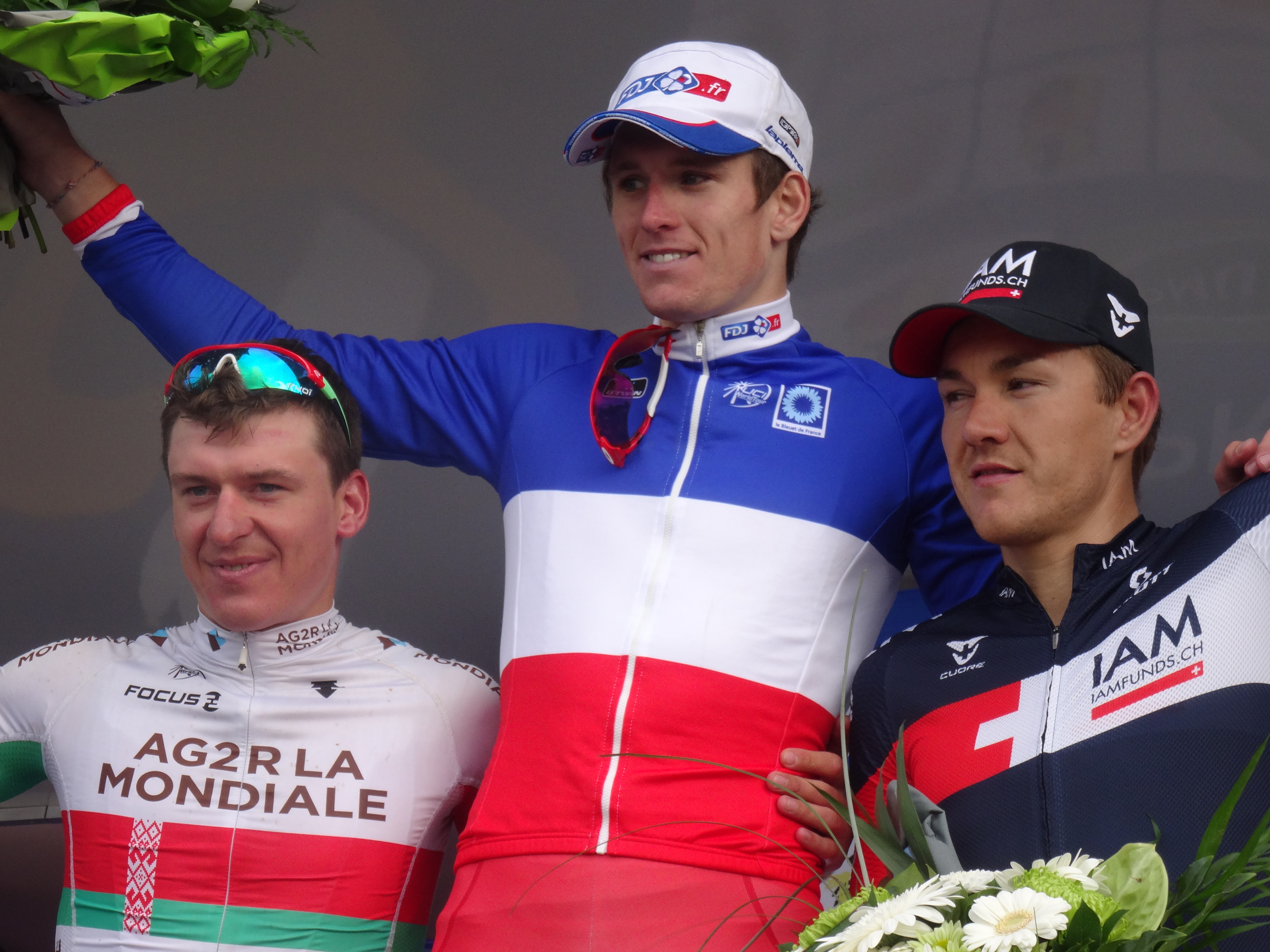
2014 Grand Prix d'Isbergues: Yauheni Hutarovich, winner Arnaud Démare and Heinrich Haussler

== Winners ==
=== Men ===
Year	Country	Rider	Team
1947	France	Eugène Dupuis	
1948	France	Eugène Dupuis	
1949	France	Paul Delrue	
1950	France	José Beyaert	
1951	France	Henri Duhamel	
1952	France	Cesare Marcelak	
1953	Belgium	Paul Taeldeman	
1954	Belgium	Jozef Planckaert	
1955	Austria	Alfred Kain	
1956	Ireland	Seamus Elliott	
1957	Belgium	Willy Truye	
1958	Belgium	Maurice Meuleman	
1959	France	Jaén-Claude Annaert	
1960	Belgium	Jozef Schils	
1961	Netherlands	Jo de Haan	
1962	Belgium	Laurent Christiaens	
1963	Belgium	Clement Roman	
1964	Belgium	Frans Melckenbeeck	
1965	Belgium	Willy Bocklandt	
1966	France	Jean Stablinski	
1967	Belgium	Paul In't Ven	
1968	Belgium	Willy In't Ven	
1969	Netherlands	Jan Janssen	
1970	France	Jean Jourden	
1971	Belgium	Daniel Van Ryckeghem	
1972	Belgium	Marc Demeyer	
1973	Belgium	Roger Rosiers	
1974	France	Bernard Bourreau	
1975	Netherlands	Joop Zoetemelk	
1976	France	Yvon Bertin	
1977	Netherlands	Joop Zoetemelk	
1978	Switzerland	Daniel Gisiger	
1979	France	Serge Perin	
1980	Belgium	Etienne De Wilde	
1981	France	André Chalmel	
1982	Sweden	Sven-Åke Nilsson	
1983	Ireland	Sean Kelly	Sem–France Loire
1984	Denmark	Kim Andersen	
1985	Netherlands	Adri van der Poel	
1986	Netherlands	Teun van Vliet	Panasonic–Merckx–Agu
1987	Australia	Allan Peiper	Panasonic–Isostar
1988	Belgium	Jan Goessens	Lotto
1989	Belgium	Sammie Moreels	Lotto
1990	France	Frédéric Moncassin	Castorama
1991	France	Jacky Durand	Castorama
1992	Australia	Phil Anderson	Motorola
1993	Estonia	Jaan Kirsipuu	Chazal
1994	Belgium	Wilfried Nelissen	Novemail–Histor–Laser Computer
1995	Belgium	Frank Corvers	Lotto–Isoglass
1996	Belgium	Mario Aerts	Vlaanderen 2002
1997	Sweden	Magnus Bäckstedt	Palmans–Lystex
1998	France	Stéphane Cueff	Mutuelle de Seine-et-Marne
1999	Estonia	Lauri Aus	Casino–Ag2r Prévoyance
2000	Belgium	Peter Van Petegem	Farm Frites
2001	Belgium	Peter Van Petegem	Palmans–Collstrop
2002	France	Cédric Vasseur	Cofidis
2003	Netherlands	Jans Koerts	BankGiroLoterij
2004	Belgium	Ludovic Capelle	Landbouwkrediet–Colnago
2005	Belgium	Niko Eeckhout	Chocolade Jacques–T Interim
2006	France	Cédric Vasseur	Quick-Step–Innergetic
2007	Switzerland	Martin Elmiger	AG2R Prévoyance
2008	France	William Bonnet	Crédit Agricole
2009	France	Benoît Vaugrenard	Française des Jeux
2010	Latvia	Aleksejs Saramotins	Team HTC–Columbia
2011	Denmark	Jonas Aaen Jørgensen	Saxo Bank–SunGard
2012	Germany	John Degenkolb	Argos–Shimano
2013	France	Arnaud Démare	FDJ.fr
2014	France	Arnaud Démare	FDJ.fr
2015	France	Nacer Bouhanni	Cofidis
2016	Norway	Kristoffer Halvorsen	Team Joker Byggtorget
2017	France	Benoît Cosnefroy	AG2R La Mondiale
2018	Belgium	Philippe Gilbert	Quick-Step Floors
2019	Denmark	Mads Pedersen	Trek–Segafredo
2020	France	Nacer Bouhanni	Arkéa–Samsic
2021	Italy	Elia Viviani	Cofidis
2022	France	Arnaud Démare	Groupama–FDJ
2023	Italy	Matteo Moschetti	Q36.5 Pro Cycling Team
2024	Netherlands	Arvid de Kleijn	Tudor Pro Cycling Team
2025	Netherlands	Olav Kooij	Visma–Lease a Bike
2026	Netherlands	Olav Kooij	Decathlon CMA CGM

=== Women ===
Year	Country	Rider	Team
2018	Australia	Lauren Kitchen	FDJ Nouvelle-Aquitaine Futuroscope
2019	Luxembourg	Christine Majerus	Boels–Dolmans
2020	Australia	Chloe Hosking	Rally Cycling
2021	Netherlands	Charlotte Kool	NXTG Racing
