= Damien Nazon =

French cyclist

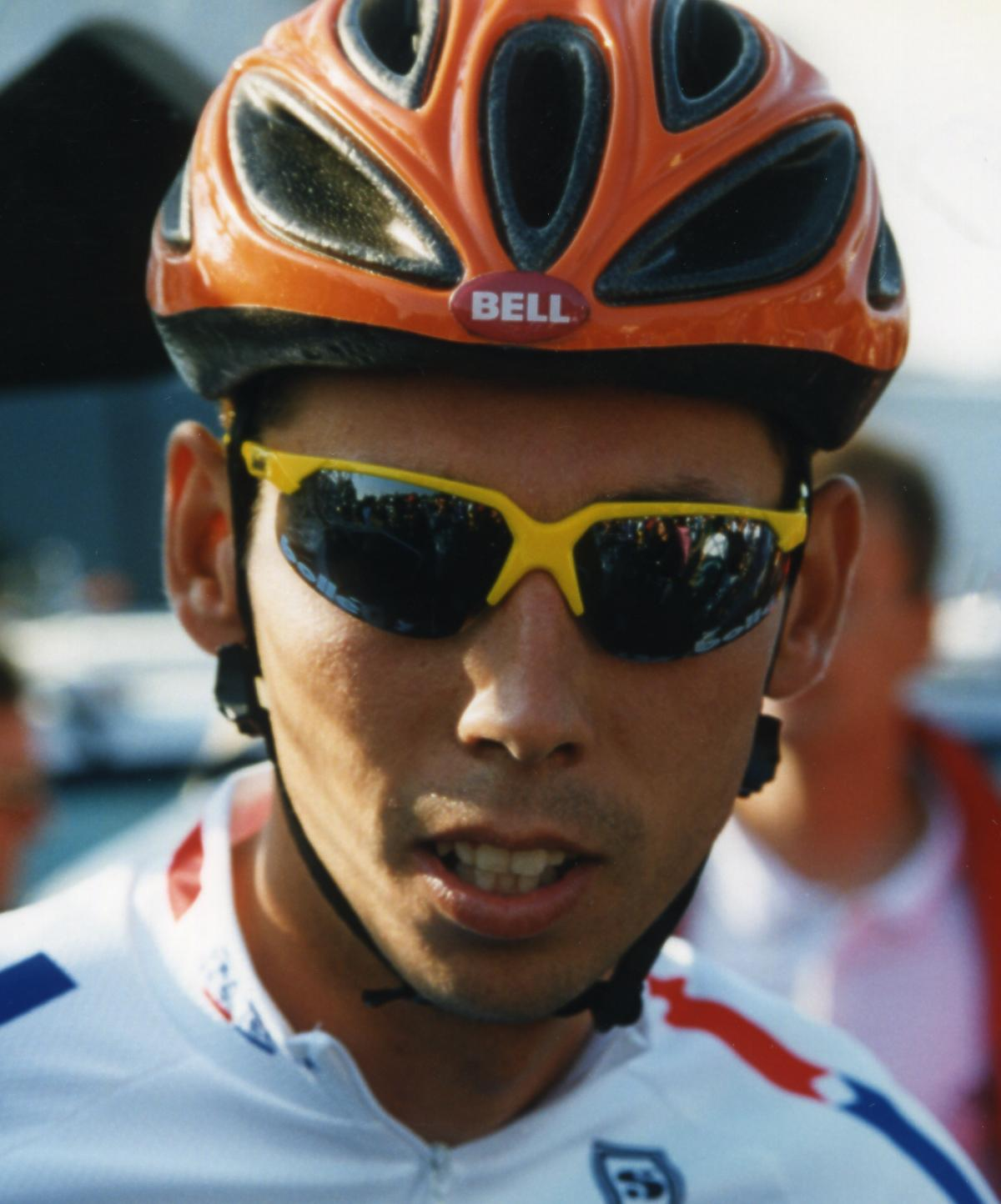
- Nazon in 1997

Personal information
- Full name: Damien Nazon
- Born: 26 June 1974 (age 52) Épinal, France

Cycling career
- Sport: Cycling
- Discipline: Road
- Role: Rider
- Rider type: Sprinter

Amateur teams
- 1995: Castorama (stagiaire)
- 2006: Pédale de L'Est Haguenau

Professional teams
- 1996: Banesto
- 1997–1999: Française des Jeux
- 2000–2003: Bonjour
- 2004–2005: Crédit Agricole

Damien Nazon (born 26 June 1974) is a former French racing cyclist. He finished in last place in the 1998 Tour de France. Nazon took a total of 33 victories during his career, including stage wins in the Dauphiné Libéré, the Grand Prix du Midi Libre, the Critérium International and the Tour of Belgium. Nazon rode for the Castorama team as a stagiaire in the autumn of 1995, before turning professional with Banesto in 1996. He then rode for Française des Jeux for three years, Bonjour for four and ended his professional career in 2005 after two years with Crédit Agricole.

He is the brother of former racing cyclist Jean-Patrick Nazon.

== Major results ==
1994
1st Stage 1 Circuit Cycliste Sarthe
1995
Peace Race

1st Stages 6 & 8b

1st Paris–Roubaix Espoirs
10th Overall Tour de l'Avenir
1997
Circuit des Mines

1st Stages 4 & 6

1st Stage 6 Tour de l'Avenir
2nd Road race, National Road Championships
10th GP de Denain
1998
1st Stage 2 Critérium du Dauphiné Libéré
1st Stage 4 GP du Midi-Libre
3rd Overall Circuit des Mines

1st Stages 1 & 2

4th Tour de Vendée
1999
Circuit Cycliste Sarthe

1st Stages 3 & 5

Tour de Normandie

1st Stages 2 & 6b

1st Stage 5 Tour de l'Avenir
6th GP de Denain
10th Tour de Vendée
2000
1st Stage 3 Tour de Langkawi
1st Stage 1 GP du Midi-Libre
1st Stage 1 Tour du Poitou Charentes et de la Vienne
1st GP de Villers-Cotterêts
4th Cholet-Pays de Loire
7th Road race, National Road Championships
8th Tro-Bro Léon
9th GP de la Ville de Rennes
2001
2nd Overall Étoile de Bessèges

1st Stages 3 & 4

5th GP de Denain
6th Tour de Vendée
2002
1st Stage 1 Tour de l'Ain
1st Stage 1 Route du Sud
1st Stage 2a Tour of Belgium
1st Stage 3 Tour du Poitou Charentes et de la Vienne
2nd Overall Tour of Qatar

1st Stage 2

3rd GP de Denain
6th Grand Prix de la Ville de Lillers Souvenir Bruno Comini
9th Road race, National Road Championships
2003
1st Grand Prix de la Ville de Lillers Souvenir Bruno Comini
1st Stage 1 Critérium International
5th Overall Tour of Qatar

1st Stage 2

5th Classic Haribo
6th Cholet-Pays de Loire
7th Dwars door Vlaanderen
10th Le Samyn
2005
1st Stage 3 Circuit Cycliste Sarthe
1st Stage 3b Tour de Picardie
4th Cholet-Pays de Loire
