= Pavel Padrnos =

Czech cyclist (born 1970)

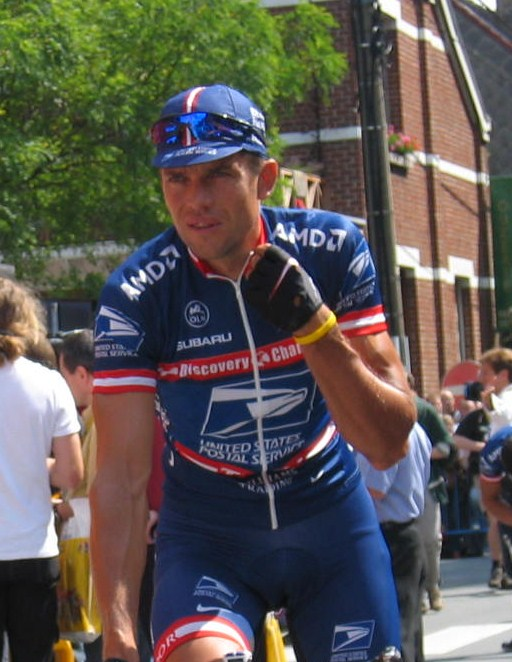
- Pavel Padrnos at 2004 Tour de France

Personal information
- Born: 17 December 1970 (age 55) Petrovice, Třebíč, Czechoslovakia
- Height: 1.90 m (6 ft 3 in)
- Weight: 83 kg (183 lb; 13 st 1 lb)

Cycling career
- Sport: Cycling
- Current team: Retired
- Discipline: Road
- Role: Rider

Professional teams
- 1996: Tico
- 1997: Roslotto–ZG Mobili
- 1998: Saeco–Cannondale
- 1999: Lampre–Daikin
- 2000–2001: Saeco–Valli & Valli
- 2002–2007: U.S. Postal Service

Major wins
- Grand Tours Tour de France 3 TTT Stages (2003, 2004, 2005)

Pavel Padrnos (born 17 December 1970) is a Czech former professional road racing cyclist, most recently with Discovery Channel whom he was with between 2002 and 2007. His major individual success is the win in Peace Race in 1995. He competed at the 1992 Summer Olympics and the 2000 Summer Olympics.

During the 2004 Tour de France the UCI were discussing whether Padrnos and Stefano Zanini of Quick-Step–Davitamon would be allowed to continue the Tour. This was because both riders had been called to appear in a case relating to doping at the 2001 Giro d'Italia. The UCI decided to let the riders continue.

== Major results ==
1988
3rd Overall Pays de Vaud Juniors
1990
1st Stage 6 Grand Prix Guillaume Tell
3rd Overall Course de la Paix
1992
2nd Overall Okolo Slovenska
2nd Overall Tour de Berlin
1993
1st GP ZTS Dubnica
3rd Overall Course de la Paix

1st Stage 6b (ITT)

1994
1st Overall Bayern Rundfahrt
1st Overall Ytong Bohemia Tour
1st Hessen Rundfahrt
7th Overall Course de la Paix

1st Stage 6

1995
1st Overall Niedersachsen Rundfahrt

1st Prologue & Stage 1

1st Overall Course de la Paix

1st Stages 3, 5, 8a & 9

1st Hessen Rundfahrt
1996
1st Stages 4 & 8 Okolo Slovenska
1997
6th Overall Vuelta a Murcia
2003
1st Stage 4 (TTT) Tour de France
2004
1st Stage 4 (TTT) Tour de France
2005
1st Stage 4 (TTT) Tour de France

=== Grand Tour general classification results timeline ===
Grand Tour	1997	1998	1999	2000	2001	2002	2003	2004	2005	2006	2007
Giro d'Italia	45	36	18	26	38	—	—	—	60	67	73
Tour de France	DNF	—	DNF	85	—	69	102	79	95	64	—
Vuelta a España	—	DNF	—	—	DNF	—	—	—	—	—	—

Legend
—	Did not compete
DNF	Did not finish
