= Gilles Maignan =

French cyclist

Personal information
- Full name: Gilles Maignan
- Born: July 30, 1968 (age 58) Argenteuil, France

Cycling career
- Sport: Cycling
- Current team: Retired
- Discipline: Road
- Role: Rider

Professional teams
- 1995–1998: Mutuelle de Seine-et-Marne
- 1999–2001: Casino–Ag2r Prévoyance
- 2002: Marlux–Ville de Charleroi

Major wins
- Tour Down Under (2000)

Gilles Maignan (born July 30, 1968 in Argenteuil, Val-d'Oise) is a French former professional road racing cyclist. He is the co-director of the Critérium du Dauphiné cycle race.

== Major results ==
1992
3rd Overall Tour du Loir et Cher E Provost
3rd Overall Ronde de l'Isard
1994
2nd Paris-Troyes
1995
9th Trophée des Grimpeurs
1997
2nd Tour de Vendée
9th Grand Prix des Nations
10th Overall Tour du Limousin
1998
1st Time trial, National Road Championships
2nd Grand Prix des Nations
2nd Chrono des Herbiers
9th Overall Tour du Limousin

1st Stage 2

1999
1st Time trial, National Road Championships
1st Stage 5 GP du Midi-Libre
2nd Overall Circuit Cycliste Sarthe
2nd Chrono des Herbiers
5th Grand Prix des Nations
7th Time trial, UCI Road World Championships
10th Overall Circuit des Mines

1st Stage 3

2000
1st Overall Tour Down Under
1st Stage 4 Tour du Poitou Charentes et de la Vienne
2nd Overall Circuit des Mines
7th Overall Circuit Cycliste Sarthe
2001
1st Grand Prix de Plumelec-Morbihan
