= Gilles Talmant =

French cyclist

Personal information
- Born: 27 April 1970 (age 56) Conflans-Sainte-Honorine, France

Cycling career
- Sport: Cycling
- Role: Rider

Gilles Talmant (born 27 April 1970) is a French former professional racing cyclist. He rode in three editions of the Tour de France.
