= Claude Lamour =

French cyclist

Personal information
- Born: 14 October 1969 (age 57)

Cycling career
- Sport: Cycling
- Role: Rider

Claude Lamour (born 14 October 1969) is a French racing cyclist. He rode in the 1999 Tour de France.
