= Dominique Rault =

French cyclist

Personal information
- Born: 2 June 1971 (age 55)

Cycling career
- Sport: Cycling
- Role: Rider

Dominique Rault (born 2 June 1971) is a French racing cyclist. He rode in the 1999 Tour de France.
