= List of teams and cyclists in the 2003 Vuelta a España =

For the 2003 Vuelta a España, the field consisted of 198 riders; 159 finished the race.

== By rider ==
Legend
No.	Starting number worn by the rider during the Vuelta
Pos.	Position in the general classification
DNF	Denotes a rider who did not finish

No.	Name	Nationality	Team	Pos.	Ref
1	Aitor González	Spain	Fassa Bortolo	DNF	
2	Juan José de los Ángeles	Spain	Fassa Bortolo	83	
3	Dario Frigo	Italy	Fassa Bortolo	21	
4	Volodymir Hustov	Ukraine	Fassa Bortolo	64	
5	Sergei Ivanov	Russia	Fassa Bortolo	103	
6	Alessandro Petacchi	Italy	Fassa Bortolo	120	
7	Matteo Tosatto	Italy	Fassa Bortolo	134	
8	Guido Trenti	United States	Fassa Bortolo	153	
9	Sven Montgomery	Switzerland	Fassa Bortolo	DNF	
11	Roberto Heras	Spain	U.S. Postal Service	1	
12	Michael Barry	Canada	U.S. Postal Service	78	
13	Manuel Beltrán	Spain	U.S. Postal Service	6	
14	George Hincapie	United States	U.S. Postal Service	DNF	
15	Benoît Joachim	Luxembourg	U.S. Postal Service	81	
16	Floyd Landis	United States	U.S. Postal Service	76	
17	Matthew White	Australia	U.S. Postal Service	127	
18	José Luis Rubiera	Spain	U.S. Postal Service	80	
19	Max van Heeswijk	Netherlands	U.S. Postal Service	139	
21	Igor González de Galdeano	Spain	ONCE–Eroski	4	
22	José Azevedo	Portugal	ONCE–Eroski	DNF	
23	Marcos Serrano	Spain	ONCE–Eroski	14	
24	Jan Hruška	Czech Republic	ONCE–Eroski	123	
25	Jörg Jaksche	Germany	ONCE–Eroski	129	
26	Isidro Nozal	Spain	ONCE–Eroski	2	
27	Mikel Pradera	Spain	ONCE–Eroski	119	
28	Joaquim Rodríguez	Spain	ONCE–Eroski	26	
29	Ángel Vicioso	Spain	ONCE–Eroski	67	
31	Alessandro Bertolini	Italy	Alessio	112	
32	Andrea Brognara	Italy	Alessio	DNF	
33	Stefano Casagranda	Italy	Alessio	135	
34	Alberto Vinale	Italy	Alessio	151	
35	Angelo Furlan	Italy	Alessio	150	
36	Ruslan Ivanov	Moldova	Alessio	DNF	
37	Denis Lunghi	Italy	Alessio	50	
38	Cristian Moreni	Italy	Alessio	49	
39	Davide Frattini	Italy	Alessio	DNF	
41	David Millar	Great Britain	Cofidis	102	
42	Daniel Atienza	Spain	Cofidis	32	
43	Angelo Lopeboselli	Italy	Cofidis	90	
44	Íñigo Cuesta	Spain	Cofidis	22	
45	Peter Farazijn	Belgium	Cofidis	DNF	
46	Bingen Fernández	Spain	Cofidis	85	
47	Dmitry Fofonov	Kazakhstan	Cofidis	105	
48	Luis Pérez Rodríguez	Spain	Cofidis	10	
49	Guido Trentin	Italy	Cofidis	19	
51	Santiago Blanco	Spain	Colchon Relax–Fuenlabrada	61	
52	Nácor Burgos	Spain	Colchon Relax–Fuenlabrada	89	
53	Josep Jufré	Spain	Colchon Relax–Fuenlabrada	20	
54	Óscar Laguna	Spain	Colchon Relax–Fuenlabrada	109	
55	José Manuel Maestre	Spain	Colchon Relax–Fuenlabrada	159	
56	David Navas	Spain	Colchon Relax–Fuenlabrada	71	
57	Germán Nieto	Spain	Colchon Relax–Fuenlabrada	155	
58	Benjamín Noval	Spain	Colchon Relax–Fuenlabrada	45	
59	José Luis Rebollo	Spain	Colchon Relax–Fuenlabrada	43	
61	Mario Cipollini	Italy	De Nardi–Colpack	DNF	
62	Santos González	Spain	De Nardi–Colpack	11	
63	Giovanni Lombardi	Italy	De Nardi–Colpack	79	
64	Miguel Ángel Martín	Spain	De Nardi–Colpack	36	
65	Gianpaolo Mondini	Italy	De Nardi–Colpack	131	
66	Kyryl Pospyeyev	Ukraine	De Nardi–Colpack	37	
67	Michele Scarponi	Italy	De Nardi–Colpack	13	
68	Francesco Secchiari	Italy	De Nardi–Colpack	DNF	
69	Filippo Simeoni	Italy	De Nardi–Colpack	118	
71	Gorka Arrizabalaga	Spain	Euskaltel–Euskadi	98	
72	David Etxebarria	Spain	Euskaltel–Euskadi	29	
73	Unai Etxebarria	Venezuela	Euskaltel–Euskadi	54	
74	Iker Flores	Spain	Euskaltel–Euskadi	18	
75	Gorka González	Spain	Euskaltel–Euskadi	38	
76	Iñaki Isasi	Spain	Euskaltel–Euskadi	91	
77	Roberto Laiseka	Spain	Euskaltel–Euskadi	60	
78	José Alberto Martínez	Spain	Euskaltel–Euskadi	31	
79	Gorka Gerrikagoitia	Spain	Euskaltel–Euskadi	DNF	
81	José Luis Arrieta	Spain	iBanesto.com	106	
82	José Vicente García	Spain	iBanesto.com	108	
83	Eladio Jiménez	Spain	iBanesto.com	48	
84	Pablo Lastras	Spain	iBanesto.com	55	
85	Francisco Mancebo	Spain	iBanesto.com	5	
86	Aitor Osa	Spain	iBanesto.com	25	
87	Unai Osa	Spain	iBanesto.com	9	
88	Leonardo Piepoli	Italy	iBanesto.com	23	
89	Juan Miguel Mercado	Spain	iBanesto.com	56	
91	Óscar Sevilla	Spain	Kelme–Costa Blanca	12	
92	Francisco Cabello	Spain	Kelme–Costa Blanca	113	
93	Jesús Manzano	Spain	Kelme–Costa Blanca	DNF	
94	Carlos García	Spain	Kelme–Costa Blanca	74	
95	José Enrique Gutiérrez	Spain	Kelme–Costa Blanca	34	
96	David Latasa	Spain	Kelme–Costa Blanca	46	
97	Antonio Tauler	Spain	Kelme–Costa Blanca	97	
98	Alejandro Valverde	Spain	Kelme–Costa Blanca	3	
99	Constantino Zaballa	Spain	Kelme–Costa Blanca	30	
101	Gustavo Otero	Spain	Labarca-2-Café Baqué	115	
102	Félix Cárdenas	Colombia	Labarca-2-Café Baqué	8	
103	Francisco Cerezo	Spain	Labarca-2-Café Baqué	96	
104	César García	Spain	Labarca-2-Café Baqué	111	
105	José Javier Gómez	Spain	Labarca-2-Café Baqué	DNF	
106	Francisco Gutiérrez	Spain	Labarca-2-Café Baqué	158	
107	Iván Herrero	Spain	Labarca-2-Café Baqué	130	
108	David López	Spain	Labarca-2-Café Baqué	47	
109	Sergio Pérez	Spain	Labarca-2-Café Baqué	DNF	
111	Wladimir Belli	Italy	Lampre	DNF	
112	Rubens Bertogliati	Switzerland	Lampre	154	
113	Simone Bertoletti	Italy	Lampre	143	
114	Mariano Piccoli	Italy	Lampre	99	
115	Alessandro Cortinovis	Italy	Lampre	DNF	
116	Juan Manuel Gárate	Spain	Lampre	69	
117	Daniele Righi	Italy	Lampre	125	
118	Patxi Vila	Spain	Lampre	52	
119	Ján Svorada	Czech Republic	Lampre	DNF	
121	Claus Michael Møller	Denmark	Milaneza-MSS	33	
122	Gonçalo Amorim	Portugal	Milaneza-MSS	39	
123	Paulo Barroso	Portugal	Milaneza-MSS	132	
124	Pedro Cardoso	Portugal	Milaneza-MSS	40	
125	Txema del Olmo	Spain	Milaneza-MSS	16	
126	Ángel Edo	Spain	Milaneza-MSS	70	
127	Joan Horrach	Spain	Milaneza-MSS	28	
128	Fabian Jeker	Switzerland	Milaneza-MSS	65	
129	Renato Silva	Portugal	Milaneza-MSS	68	
131	José Antonio Pecharromán	Spain	Jazztel-Costa de Almería	DNF	
132	Rafael Casero	Spain	Jazztel-Costa de Almería	86	
133	Pedro Díaz Lobato	Spain	Jazztel-Costa de Almería	117	
134	Jorge Ferrío	Spain	Jazztel-Costa de Almería	57	
135	Domingo Sánchez	Spain	Jazztel-Costa de Almería	DNF	
136	Carlos Golbano	Spain	Jazztel-Costa de Almería	84	
137	José Luis Martínez	Spain	Jazztel-Costa de Almería	63	
138	Carlos Torrent	Spain	Jazztel-Costa de Almería	41	
139	Joaquín López	Spain	Jazztel-Costa de Almería	93	
141	Alex Zülle	Switzerland	Phonak	DNF	
142	Niki Aebersold	Switzerland	Phonak	144	
143	Gonzalo Bayarri	Spain	Phonak	157	
144	Cyril Dessel	France	Phonak	DNF	
145	Juan Carlos Domínguez	Spain	Phonak	DNF	
146	Bert Grabsch	Germany	Phonak	88	
147	Óscar Pereiro	Spain	Phonak	17	
148	Santiago Pérez	Spain	Phonak	44	
149	Alexandre Usov	Belarus	Phonak	145	
151	Richard Virenque	France	Quick-Step–Davitamon	DNF	
152	Tom Boonen	Belgium	Quick-Step–Davitamon	92	
153	David Cañada	Spain	Quick-Step–Davitamon	53	
154	Pedro Horrillo	Spain	Quick-Step–Davitamon	124	
155	Patrik Sinkewitz	Germany	Quick-Step–Davitamon	73	
156	Bram Tankink	Netherlands	Quick-Step–Davitamon	94	
157	Kurt Van De Wouwer	Belgium	Quick-Step–Davitamon	66	
158	Frank Vandenbroucke	Belgium	Quick-Step–Davitamon	DNF	
159	Jurgen Van Goolen	Belgium	Quick-Step–Davitamon	42	
161	Steven de Jongh	Netherlands	Rabobank	146	
162	Jan Boven	Netherlands	Rabobank	141	
163	Addy Engels	Netherlands	Rabobank	114	
164	Mathew Hayman	Australia	Rabobank	137	
165	Karsten Kroon	Netherlands	Rabobank	100	
166	Levi Leipheimer	United States	Rabobank	58	
167	Michael Rasmussen	Denmark	Rabobank	7	
168	Ronald Mutsaars	Netherlands	Rabobank	138	
169	Beat Zberg	Switzerland	Rabobank	77	
171	Igor Astarloa	Spain	Saeco	DNF	
172	Giosuè Bonomi	Italy	Saeco	DNF	
173	Antonio Bucciero	Italy	Saeco	DNF	
174	Juan Manuel Fuentes	Spain	Saeco	121	
175	Gerrit Glomser	Austria	Saeco	DNF	
176	Nicola Gavazzi	Italy	Saeco	DNF	
177	Cristian Pepoli	Italy	Saeco	148	
178	Igor Pugaci	Moldova	Saeco	147	
179	Ivan Quaranta	Italy	Saeco	DNF	
181	Ángel Casero	Spain	Team Bianchi	DNF	
182	Félix García Casas	Spain	Team Bianchi	15	
183	Aitor Garmendia	Spain	Team Bianchi	122	
184	Fabrizio Guidi	Italy	Team Bianchi	82	
185	Jaime Hernández	Spain	Team Bianchi	DNF	
186	Francisco José Lara	Spain	Team Bianchi	59	
187	David Plaza	Spain	Team Bianchi	DNF	
188	Thorsten Rund	Germany	Team Bianchi	142	
189	Raphael Schweda	Germany	Team Bianchi	104	
191	Carlos Sastre	Spain	Team CSC	35	
192	Thomas Bruun	Denmark	Team CSC	149	
193	Manuel Calvente	Spain	Team CSC	24	
194	Bekim Christensen	Denmark	Team CSC	136	
195	Julian Dean	New Zealand	Team CSC	DNF	
196	Peter Luttenberger	Austria	Team CSC	62	
197	Fränk Schleck	Luxembourg	Team CSC	DNF	
198	Nicki Sørensen	Denmark	Team CSC	87	
199	Michael Sandstød	Denmark	Team CSC	152	
201	Erik Zabel	Germany	Team Telekom	72	
202	Mario Aerts	Belgium	Team Telekom	51	
203	Cadel Evans	Australia	Team Telekom	DNF	
204	Jan Schaffrath	Germany	Team Telekom	DNF	
205	Torsten Hiekmann	Germany	Team Telekom	75	
206	Bobby Julich	United States	Team Telekom	95	
207	Stephan Schreck	Germany	Team Telekom	101	
208	Christian Werner	Germany	Team Telekom	27	
209	Steffen Wesemann	Germany	Team Telekom	110	
211	Massimo Apollonio	Italy	Vini Caldirola–So.di	DNF	
212	Gianluca Sironi	Italy	Vini Caldirola–So.di	140	
213	Patrick Calcagni	Switzerland	Vini Caldirola–So.di	128	
214	Giampaolo Cheula	Italy	Vini Caldirola–So.di	107	
215	David de la Fuente	Spain	Vini Caldirola–So.di	156	
216	Simone Masciarelli	Italy	Vini Caldirola–So.di	126	
217	Pietro Zucconi	Switzerland	Vini Caldirola–So.di	133	
218	Oscar Mason	Italy	Vini Caldirola–So.di	DNF	
219	Fred Rodriguez	United States	Vini Caldirola–So.di	116	
