= List of teams and cyclists in the 2002 Vuelta a España =

For the 2002 Vuelta a España, the field consisted of 207 riders; 132 finished the race.

== By rider ==
Legend
No.	Starting number worn by the rider during the Vuelta
Pos.	Position in the general classification
DNF	Denotes a rider who did not finish

No.	Name	Nationality	Team	Pos.	Ref
1	Ángel Casero	Spain	Team Coast	6	
2	Daniel Becke	Germany	Team Coast	124	
3	Manuel Beltrán	Spain	Team Coast	9	
4	Fernando Escartín	Spain	Team Coast	DNF	
5	Aitor Garmendia	Spain	Team Coast	85	
6	Fabrizio Guidi	Italy	Team Coast	DNF	
7	Jaime Hernandez	Spain	Team Coast	117	
8	Luis Pérez	Spain	Team Coast	22	
9	David Plaza	Spain	Team Coast	14	
11	Santos González	Spain	Acqua & Sapone–Cantina Tollo	59	
12	Daniele Bennati	Italy	Acqua & Sapone–Cantina Tollo	DNF	
13	Mario Cipollini	Italy	Acqua & Sapone–Cantina Tollo	DNF	
14	Martin Derganc	Slovenia	Acqua & Sapone–Cantina Tollo	DNF	
15	Rubén Lobato	Spain	Acqua & Sapone–Cantina Tollo	123	
16	Giovanni Lombardi	Italy	Acqua & Sapone–Cantina Tollo	DNF	
17	Miguel Ángel Martín Perdiguero	Spain	Acqua & Sapone–Cantina Tollo	42	
18	Mario Scirea	Italy	Acqua & Sapone–Cantina Tollo	DNF	
19	Guido Trenti	United States	Acqua & Sapone–Cantina Tollo	DNF	
21	Mikel Astarloza	Spain	AG2R Prévoyance	77	
22	Lauri Aus	Estonia	AG2R Prévoyance	DNF	
23	Stéphane Bergès	France	AG2R Prévoyance	DNF	
24	Alexander Bocharov	Russia	AG2R Prévoyance	61	
25	Íñigo Chaurreau	Spain	AG2R Prévoyance	DNF	
26	Nicolas Inaudi	France	AG2R Prévoyance	DNF	
27	Thierry Loder	France	AG2R Prévoyance	DNF	
28	Christophe Oriol	France	AG2R Prévoyance	91	
29	Nicolas Portal	France	AG2R Prévoyance	84	
31	Pietro Caucchioli	Italy	Alessio	23	
32	Andrea Brognara	Italy	Alessio	DNF	
33	Raffaele Ferrara	Italy	Alessio	DNF	
34	Angelo Furlan	Italy	Alessio	121	
35	Vladimir Miholjević	Croatia	Alessio	24	
36	Aleksandar Nikacevic	Serbia	Alessio	DNF	
37	Dario Pieri	Italy	Alessio	DNF	
38	Alberto Vinale	Italy	Alessio	128	
39	Mauro Zanetti	Italy	Alessio	DNF	
41	Félix García Casas	Spain	BigMat–Auber 93	8	
42	Guillaume Auger	France	BigMat–Auber 93	DNF	
43	Stéphane Heulot	France	BigMat–Auber 93	DNF	
44	Jeremy Hunt	Great Britain	BigMat–Auber 93	DNF	
45	Xavier Jan	France	BigMat–Auber 93	DNF	
46	Aitor Kintana	Spain	BigMat–Auber 93	53	
47	Cyril Saugrain	France	BigMat–Auber 93	114	
48	Alexei Sivakov	Russia	BigMat–Auber 93	126	
49	Sébastien Talabardon	France	BigMat–Auber 93	110	
51	David Millar	Great Britain	Cofidis	DNF	
52	Daniel Atienza	Spain	Cofidis	28	
53	Íñigo Cuesta	Spain	Cofidis	DNF	
54	Médéric Clain	France	Cofidis	70	
55	Bingen Fernández	Spain	Cofidis	87	
56	Massimiliano Lelli	Italy	Cofidis	DNF	
57	Robert Sassone	France	Cofidis	127	
58	Dmitry Fofonov	Kazakhstan	Cofidis	78	
59	Guido Trentin	Italy	Cofidis	15	
61	Jeroen Blijlevens	Netherlands	Domo–Farm Frites	DNF	
62	Dave Bruylandts	Belgium	Domo–Farm Frites	56	
63	Steve De Wolf	Belgium	Domo–Farm Frites	DNF	
64	Leif Hoste	Belgium	Domo–Farm Frites	DNF	
65	Andrey Kashechkin	Kazakhstan	Domo–Farm Frites	DNF	
66	Steven Kleynen	Belgium	Domo–Farm Frites	26	
67	Koos Moerenhout	Netherlands	Domo–Farm Frites	72	
68	Bram Tankink	Netherlands	Domo–Farm Frites	DNF	
69	Jurgen Van Goolen	Belgium	Domo–Farm Frites	116	
71	Mikel Artetxe	Spain	Euskaltel–Euskadi	86	
72	David Etxebarria	Spain	Euskaltel–Euskadi	DNF	
73	Iker Flores	Spain	Euskaltel–Euskadi	71	
74	Gorka Gerrikagoitia	Spain	Euskaltel–Euskadi	107	
75	Roberto Laiseka	Spain	Euskaltel–Euskadi	DNF	
76	Alberto López de Munain	Spain	Euskaltel–Euskadi	65	
77	José Alberto Martínez	Spain	Euskaltel–Euskadi	112	
78	Iban Mayo	Spain	Euskaltel–Euskadi	5	
79	Haimar Zubeldia	Spain	Euskaltel–Euskadi	11	
81	Francesco Casagrande	Italy	Fassa Bortolo	7	
82	Fabio Baldato	Italy	Fassa Bortolo	DNF	
83	Nicola Loda	Italy	Fassa Bortolo	88	
84	Alessandro Petacchi	Italy	Fassa Bortolo	94	
85	Gorazd Štangelj	Slovenia	Fassa Bortolo	74	
86	Paolo Tiralongo	Italy	Fassa Bortolo	43	
87	Tadej Valjavec	Slovenia	Fassa Bortolo	18	
88	Marco Velo	Italy	Fassa Bortolo	57	
89	Denis Zanette	Italy	Fassa Bortolo	104	
91	Juan Miguel Mercado	Spain	iBanesto.com	DNF	
92	Santiago Blanco	Spain	iBanesto.com	45	
93	Juan Antonio Flecha	Spain	iBanesto.com	41	
94	José Vicente García Acosta	Spain	iBanesto.com	75	
95	José Iván Gutiérrez	Spain	iBanesto.com	100	
96	Pablo Lastras	Spain	iBanesto.com	17	
97	Francisco Mancebo	Spain	iBanesto.com	DNF	
98	Jon Odriozola	Spain	iBanesto.com	DNF	
99	Aitor Osa	Spain	iBanesto.com	54	
101	Paolo Savoldelli	Italy	Index–Alexia Alluminio	DNF	
102	Dario Andriotto	Italy	Index–Alexia Alluminio	DNF	
103	Giuseppe Di Grande	Italy	Index–Alexia Alluminio	DNF	
104	Alessandro Guerra	Italy	Index–Alexia Alluminio	122	
105	Marco Magnani	Italy	Index–Alexia Alluminio	DNF	
106	Daniele Galli	Italy	Index–Alexia Alluminio	DNF	
107	Ivan Quaranta	Italy	Index–Alexia Alluminio	DNF	
108	Corrado Serina	Italy	Index–Alexia Alluminio	DNF	
109	Andris Reiss	Latvia	Index–Alexia Alluminio	95	
111	Rafael Casero	Spain	Jazztel–Costa de Almería	40	
112	Dario Gadeo	Spain	Jazztel–Costa de Almería	115	
113	Jorge Ferrío	Spain	Jazztel–Costa de Almería	49	
114	José Antonio Garrido	Spain	Jazztel–Costa de Almería	36	
115	Juan Carlos Guillamón	Spain	Jazztel–Costa de Almería	125	
116	Serguei Smetanine	Russia	Jazztel–Costa de Almería	80	
117	José Antonio Pecharromán	Spain	Jazztel–Costa de Almería	27	
118	Carlos Torrent	Spain	Jazztel–Costa de Almería	73	
119	Ricardo Valdés	Spain	Jazztel–Costa de Almería	DNF	
121	Óscar Sevilla	Spain	Kelme–Costa Blanca	4	
122	Santiago Botero	Colombia	Kelme–Costa Blanca	66	
123	Juan José de los Ángeles	Spain	Kelme–Costa Blanca	52	
124	Carlos García Quesada	Spain	Kelme–Costa Blanca	19	
125	Aitor González	Spain	Kelme–Costa Blanca	1	
126	José Enrique Gutiérrez	Spain	Kelme–Costa Blanca	37	
127	Jesús Manzano	Spain	Kelme–Costa Blanca	DNF	
128	Antonio Tauler	Spain	Kelme–Costa Blanca	39	
129	Alejandro Valverde	Spain	Kelme–Costa Blanca	DNF	
131	Juan Manuel Gárate	Spain	Lampre–Daikin	DNF	
132	Simone Bertoletti	Italy	Lampre–Daikin	31	
133	Massimo Codol	Italy	Lampre–Daikin	48	
134	Milan Kadlec	Czech Republic	Lampre–Daikin	DNF	
135	Johan Verstrepen	Belgium	Lampre–Daikin	DNF	
136	Mariano Piccoli	Italy	Lampre–Daikin	102	
137	Zbigniew Spruch	Poland	Lampre–Daikin	130	
138	Ján Svorada	Czech Republic	Lampre–Daikin	108	
139	Pavel Tonkov	Russia	Lampre–Daikin	67	
141	Óscar Freire	Spain	Mapei–Quick-Step	DNF	
142	Elio Aggiano	Italy	Mapei–Quick-Step	DNF	
143	Davide Bramati	Italy	Mapei–Quick-Step	97	
144	David Cañada	Spain	Mapei–Quick-Step	50	
145	Dario Cioni	Italy	Mapei–Quick-Step	55	
146	Pedro Horrillo	Spain	Mapei–Quick-Step	DNF	
147	Andrea Noè	Italy	Mapei–Quick-Step	DNF	
148	Eddy Ratti	Italy	Mapei–Quick-Step	DNF	
149	Charles Wegelius	Great Britain	Mapei–Quick-Step	109	
151	Claus Michael Møller	Denmark	Milaneza–MSS	12	
152	Ángel Edo	Spain	Milaneza–MSS	60	
153	Victoriano Fernández	Spain	Milaneza–MSS	DNF	
154	Joan Horrach	Spain	Milaneza–MSS	33	
155	Fabian Jeker	Switzerland	Milaneza–MSS	13	
156	Rui Lavarinhas	Portugal	Milaneza–MSS	32	
157	Melcior Mauri	Spain	Milaneza–MSS	DNF	
158	João Silva	Portugal	Milaneza–MSS	58	
159	Rui Sousa	Portugal	Milaneza–MSS	16	
161	Joseba Beloki	Spain	ONCE–Eroski	3	
162	Igor González de Galdeano	Spain	ONCE–Eroski	DNF	
163	José Azevedo	Portugal	ONCE–Eroski	34	
164	Rafael Díaz Justo	Spain	ONCE–Eroski	62	
165	Jan Hruška	Czech Republic	ONCE–Eroski	DNF	
166	Jörg Jaksche	Germany	ONCE–Eroski	DNF	
167	Mikel Pradera	Spain	ONCE–Eroski	98	
168	Marcos Serrano	Spain	ONCE–Eroski	38	
169	Mikel Zarrabeitia	Spain	ONCE–Eroski	21	
171	Oscar Camenzind	Switzerland	Phonak	DNF	
172	Gonzalo Bayarri	Spain	Phonak	DNF	
173	Reto Bergmann	Switzerland	Phonak	92	
174	Juan Carlos Domínguez	Spain	Phonak	93	
175	Bert Grabsch	Germany	Phonak	101	
176	Óscar Pereiro	Spain	Phonak	30	
177	Benoît Salmon	France	Phonak	83	
178	Daniel Schnider	Switzerland	Phonak	68	
179	Sven Teutenberg	Germany	Phonak	132	
181	Nácor Burgos	Spain	Colchon Relax–Fuenlabrada	35	
182	Antonio Colom	Spain	Colchon Relax–Fuenlabrada	DNF	
183	Martín Garrido	Argentina	Colchon Relax–Fuenlabrada	DNF	
184	Óscar Laguna	Spain	Colchon Relax–Fuenlabrada	64	
185	José Manuel Maestre	Spain	Colchon Relax–Fuenlabrada	111	
186	Germán Nieto	Spain	Colchon Relax–Fuenlabrada	131	
187	Benjamín Noval	Spain	Colchon Relax–Fuenlabrada	DNF	
188	José Luis Rebollo	Spain	Colchon Relax–Fuenlabrada	46	
189	José Manuel Vázquez	Spain	Colchon Relax–Fuenlabrada	99	
191	Gilberto Simoni	Italy	Saeco–Longoni Sport	10	
192	Igor Astarloa	Spain	Saeco–Longoni Sport	63	
193	Leonardo Bertagnolli	Italy	Saeco–Longoni Sport	106	
194	Danilo Di Luca	Italy	Saeco–Longoni Sport	20	
195	Juan Manuel Fuentes	Spain	Saeco–Longoni Sport	79	
196	Alessio Galletti	Italy	Saeco–Longoni Sport	DNF	
197	Gerrit Glomser	Austria	Saeco–Longoni Sport	44	
198	Fabio Sacchi	Italy	Saeco–Longoni Sport	76	
199	Alessandro Spezialetti	Italy	Saeco–Longoni Sport	DNF	
201	Peter Luttenberger	Austria	Tacconi Sport	81	
202	Gabriele Balducci	Italy	Tacconi Sport	DNF	
203	Paolo Bossoni	Italy	Tacconi Sport	96	
204	Patrick Calcagni	Switzerland	Tacconi Sport	103	
205	Diego Ferrari	Italy	Tacconi Sport	113	
206	Andrej Hauptman	Slovenia	Tacconi Sport	90	
207	Zoran Klemenčič	Slovenia	Tacconi Sport	DNF	
208	Sylwester Szmyd	Poland	Tacconi Sport	29	
209	Pietro Zucconi	Switzerland	Tacconi Sport	119	
211	Erik Zabel	Germany	Team Telekom	69	
212	Rolf Aldag	Germany	Team Telekom	82	
213	Robert Bartko	Germany	Team Telekom	105	
214	Matthias Kessler	Germany	Team Telekom	47	
215	Andreas Klier	Germany	Team Telekom	DNF	
216	Andreas Klöden	Germany	Team Telekom	DNF	
217	Jan Schaffrath	Germany	Team Telekom	89	
218	Alexander Vinokourov	Kazakhstan	Team Telekom	DNF	
219	Serguei Yakovlev	Kazakhstan	Team Telekom	DNF	
221	Roberto Heras	Spain	U.S. Postal Service	2	
222	José Luis Rubiera	Spain	U.S. Postal Service	51	
223	Michael Barry	Canada	U.S. Postal Service	DNF	
224	David Zabriskie	United States	U.S. Postal Service	120	
225	Antonio Cruz	United States	U.S. Postal Service	118	
226	Steffen Kjærgaard	Norway	U.S. Postal Service	DNF	
227	Víctor Hugo Peña	Colombia	U.S. Postal Service	DNF	
228	Christian Vande Velde	United States	U.S. Postal Service	25	
229	Matthew White	Australia	U.S. Postal Service	129	
