= List of teams and cyclists in the 2001 Vuelta a España =

For the 2001 Vuelta a España, the field consisted of 189 riders; 139 finished the race.

== By rider ==
Legend
No.	Starting number worn by the rider during the Vuelta
Pos.	Position in the general classification
DNF	Denotes a rider who did not finish

No.	Name	Nationality	Team	Pos.	Ref
1	Roberto Heras	Spain	U.S. Postal Service	4	
2	José Luis Rubiera	Spain	U.S. Postal Service	7	
3	Antonio Cruz	United States	U.S. Postal Service	103	
4	Julian Dean	New Zealand	U.S. Postal Service	DNF	
5	Benoît Joachim	Luxembourg	U.S. Postal Service	88	
6	Levi Leipheimer	United States	U.S. Postal Service	3	
7	Chann McRae	United States	U.S. Postal Service	96	
8	Víctor Hugo Peña	Colombia	U.S. Postal Service	91	
9	Matthew White	Australia	U.S. Postal Service	DNF	
11	Ivan Gotti	Italy	Alessio	DNF	
12	Stefano Casagranda	Italy	Alessio	133	
13	Davide Casarotto	Italy	Alessio	DNF	
14	Martin Hvastija	Slovenia	Alessio	DNF	
15	Endrio Leoni	Italy	Alessio	DNF	
16	Franco Pellizotti	Italy	Alessio	20	
17	Alexandr Shefer	Kazakhstan	Alessio	62	
18	Alberto Vinale	Italy	Alessio	127	
19	Ruslan Ivanov	Moldova	Alessio	DNF	
21	Unai Osa	Spain	iBanesto.com	22	
22	Jon Odriozola	Spain	iBanesto.com	83	
23	Dariusz Baranowski	Poland	iBanesto.com	34	
24	Santiago Blanco	Spain	iBanesto.com	21	
25	Juan Carlos Domínguez	Spain	iBanesto.com	121	
26	José Vicente García	Spain	iBanesto.com	111	
27	José María Jiménez	Spain	iBanesto.com	17	
28	Aitor Osa	Spain	iBanesto.com	9	
29	Juan Miguel Mercado	Spain	iBanesto.com	5	
31	Fernando Escartín	Spain	Team Coast–Buffalo	10	
32	Alex Zülle	Switzerland	Team Coast–Buffalo	109	
33	Niki Aebersold	Switzerland	Team Coast–Buffalo	90	
34	Bekim Christensen	Denmark	Team Coast–Buffalo	DNF	
35	Aitor Garmendia	Spain	Team Coast–Buffalo	DNF	
36	Mauro Gianetti	Switzerland	Team Coast–Buffalo	DNF	
37	Frank Høj	Denmark	Team Coast–Buffalo	128	
38	Rolf Huser	Switzerland	Team Coast–Buffalo	108	
39	Raphael Schweda	Germany	Team Coast–Buffalo	131	
41	David Millar	Great Britain	Cofidis	41	
42	Daniel Atienza	Spain	Cofidis	48	
43	Íñigo Cuesta	Spain	Cofidis	13	
44	Peter Farazijn	Belgium	Cofidis	58	
45	Dmitry Fofonov	Kazakhstan	Cofidis	57	
46	Massimiliano Lelli	Italy	Cofidis	44	
47	Claude Lamour	France	Cofidis	97	
48	Janek Tombak	Estonia	Cofidis	DNF	
49	Guido Trentin	Italy	Cofidis	74	
51	Danilo Di Luca	Italy	Cantina Tollo–Acqua & Sapone	DNF	
52	Roberto Conti	Italy	Cantina Tollo–Acqua & Sapone	23	
53	Massimiliano Gentili	Italy	Cantina Tollo–Acqua & Sapone	DNF	
54	Massimo Giunti	Italy	Cantina Tollo–Acqua & Sapone	60	
55	Miguel Ángel Martín Perdiguero	Spain	Cantina Tollo–Acqua & Sapone	DNF	
56	Kyrylo Pospyeyev	Ukraine	Cantina Tollo–Acqua & Sapone	82	
57	Filippo Simeoni	Italy	Cantina Tollo–Acqua & Sapone	61	
58	Andrea Tonti	Italy	Cantina Tollo–Acqua & Sapone	136	
59	Guido Trenti	United States	Cantina Tollo–Acqua & Sapone	81	
61	Richard Virenque	France	Domo–Farm Frites–Latexco	24	
62	Dave Bruylandts	Belgium	Domo–Farm Frites–Latexco	51	
63	Wilfried Cretskens	Belgium	Domo–Farm Frites–Latexco	116	
64	Leif Hoste	Belgium	Domo–Farm Frites–Latexco	DNF	
65	Steven Kleynen	Belgium	Domo–Farm Frites–Latexco	67	
66	Tomáš Konečný	Czech Republic	Domo–Farm Frites–Latexco	16	
67	Glenn Magnusson	Sweden	Domo–Farm Frites–Latexco	DNF	
68	Robbie McEwen	Australia	Domo–Farm Frites–Latexco	139	
69	Steve De Wolf	Belgium	Domo–Farm Frites–Latexco	DNF	
71	David Etxebarria	Spain	Euskaltel–Euskadi	45	
72	Bingen Fernández	Spain	Euskaltel–Euskadi	50	
73	Igor Flores	Spain	Euskaltel–Euskadi	65	
74	Gorka Gerrikagoitia	Spain	Euskaltel–Euskadi	101	
75	Roberto Laiseka	Spain	Euskaltel–Euskadi	12	
76	Alberto López de Munain	Spain	Euskaltel–Euskadi	129	
77	José Alberto Martínez Trinidad	Spain	Euskaltel–Euskadi	28	
78	Iban Mayo	Spain	Euskaltel–Euskadi	11	
79	Haimar Zubeldia	Spain	Euskaltel–Euskadi	43	
81	Ángel Casero	Spain	Festina	1	
82	Félix García Casas	Spain	Festina	15	
83	Jaime Hernández Bertrán	Spain	Festina	89	
84	Rafael Casero	Spain	Festina	123	
85	Luis Pérez	Spain	Festina	14	
86	David Plaza	Spain	Festina	6	
87	José Luis Rebollo	Spain	Festina	30	
88	Sven Teutenberg	Germany	Festina	134	
89	Juan Carlos Vicario	Spain	Festina	33	
91	Eleuterio Anguita	Spain	Jazztel–Costa de Almería	32	
92	Ricardo Valdés	Spain	Jazztel–Costa de Almería	DNF	
93	Pedro Díaz Lobato	Spain	Jazztel–Costa de Almería	122	
94	Carlos Ramón Golbano	Spain	Jazztel–Costa de Almería	79	
95	Juan Carlos Guillamón	Spain	Jazztel–Costa de Almería	112	
96	Aitor Kintana	Spain	Jazztel–Costa de Almería	DNF	
97	José Antonio Pecharromán	Spain	Jazztel–Costa de Almería	49	
98	Serguei Smetanine	Russia	Jazztel–Costa de Almería	114	
99	Carlos Torrent	Spain	Jazztel–Costa de Almería	117	
101	Óscar Sevilla	Spain	Kelme–Costa Blanca	2	
102	Santiago Botero	Colombia	Kelme–Costa Blanca	18	
103	Francisco Cabello	Spain	Kelme–Costa Blanca	75	
104	Félix Cárdenas	Colombia	Kelme–Costa Blanca	95	
105	José Javier Gómez Gozalo	Spain	Kelme–Costa Blanca	26	
106	José Enrique Gutiérrez	Spain	Kelme–Costa Blanca	DNF	
107	Antonio Tauler	Spain	Kelme–Costa Blanca	55	
108	Ángel Vicioso	Spain	Kelme–Costa Blanca	52	
109	José Ángel Vidal	Spain	Kelme–Costa Blanca	115	
111	Gilberto Simoni	Italy	Lampre–Daikin	36	
112	Marco Pinotti	Italy	Lampre–Daikin	126	
113	Simone Bertoletti	Italy	Lampre–Daikin	132	
114	Oscar Camenzind	Switzerland	Lampre–Daikin	DNF	
115	Massimo Codol	Italy	Lampre–Daikin	53	
116	Juan Manuel Gárate	Spain	Lampre–Daikin	37	
117	Robert Hunter	South Africa	Lampre–Daikin	118	
118	Luciano Pagliarini	Brazil	Lampre–Daikin	DNF	
119	Mariano Piccoli	Italy	Lampre–Daikin	102	
121	Óscar Freire	Spain	Mapei–Quick-Step	DNF	
122	Elio Aggiano	Italy	Mapei–Quick-Step	DNF	
123	Manuel Beltrán	Spain	Mapei–Quick-Step	19	
124	David Cañada	Spain	Mapei–Quick-Step	DNF	
125	Dario Cioni	Italy	Mapei–Quick-Step	35	
126	Pedro Horrillo	Spain	Mapei–Quick-Step	76	
127	Eddy Ratti	Italy	Mapei–Quick-Step	110	
128	Andrea Noè	Italy	Mapei–Quick-Step	DNF	
129	Luca Paolini	Italy	Mapei–Quick-Step	106	
131	Marco Pantani	Italy	Mercatone Uno–Stream TV	DNF	
132	Michael Andersson	Sweden	Mercatone Uno–Stream TV	DNF	
133	Igor Astarloa	Spain	Mercatone Uno–Stream TV	DNF	
134	Ermanno Brignoli	Italy	Mercatone Uno–Stream TV	DNF	
135	Daniel Clavero	Spain	Mercatone Uno–Stream TV	46	
136	Fabiano Fontanelli	Italy	Mercatone Uno–Stream TV	DNF	
137	Gianmario Ortenzi	Italy	Mercatone Uno–Stream TV	125	
138	Daniele De Paoli	Italy	Mercatone Uno–Stream TV	DNF	
139	Cristian Moreni	Italy	Mercatone Uno–Stream TV	68	
141	Melcior Mauri	Spain	Milaneza–MSS	120	
142	Ángel Edo	Spain	Milaneza–MSS	77	
143	Carlos Carneiro	Portugal	Milaneza–MSS	130	
144	Victoriano Fernández	Spain	Milaneza–MSS	47	
145	Fabian Jeker	Switzerland	Milaneza–MSS	71	
146	Rui Lavarinhas	Portugal	Milaneza–MSS	27	
147	Claus Michael Møller	Denmark	Milaneza–MSS	8	
148	João Silva	Portugal	Milaneza–MSS	38	
149	Renato Silva	Portugal	Milaneza–MSS	DNF	
151	Abraham Olano	Spain	ONCE–Eroski	64	
152	Joseba Beloki	Spain	ONCE–Eroski	DNF	
153	Rafael Díaz Justo	Spain	ONCE–Eroski	54	
154	Santos González Capilla	Spain	ONCE–Eroski	66	
155	Igor González de Galdeano	Spain	ONCE–Eroski	DNF	
156	Jörg Jaksche	Germany	ONCE–Eroski	73	
157	Carlos Sastre	Spain	ONCE–Eroski	DNF	
158	Marcos Serrano	Spain	ONCE–Eroski	DNF	
159	Mikel Zarrabeitia	Spain	ONCE–Eroski	25	
161	Giuliano Figueras	Italia	Ceramiche Panaria–Fiordo	29	
162	Julio Alberto Pérez Cuapio	Mexico	Ceramiche Panaria–Fiordo	80	
163	Enrico Degano	Italy	Ceramiche Panaria–Fiordo	DNF	
164	Vladimir Duma	Ukraine	Ceramiche Panaria–Fiordo	105	
165	Antonio Varriale	Italy	Ceramiche Panaria–Fiordo	DNF	
166	Sergiy Matveyev	Ukraine	Ceramiche Panaria–Fiordo	DNF	
167	Nathan O'Neill	Australia	Ceramiche Panaria–Fiordo	104	
168	Filippo Perfetto	Italy	Ceramiche Panaria–Fiordo	DNF	
169	Yaugeni Seniuskin	Belarus	Ceramiche Panaria–Fiordo	DNF	
171	Beat Zberg	Switzerland	Rabobank	31	
172	Markus Zberg	Switzerland	Rabobank	DNF	
173	Jan Boven	Netherlands	Rabobank	98	
174	Addy Engels	Netherlands	Rabobank	84	
175	Karsten Kroon	Netherlands	Rabobank	107	
176	Marc Lotz	Netherlands	Rabobank	100	
177	Matthé Pronk	Netherlands	Rabobank	56	
178	Thorwald Veneberg	Netherlands	Rabobank	78	
179	Geert Verheyen	Belgium	Rabobank	40	
181	Nácor Burgos	Spain	Colchon Relax–Fuenlabrada	DNF	
182	Jorge Capitán	Spain	Colchon Relax–Fuenlabrada	99	
183	David Fernández	Spain	Colchon Relax–Fuenlabrada	124	
184	Juan Antonio Flecha	Spain	Colchon Relax–Fuenlabrada	72	
185	César García Calvo	Spain	Colchon Relax–Fuenlabrada	87	
186	Martín Garrido	Argentina	Colchon Relax–Fuenlabrada	DNF	
187	Óscar Laguna	Spain	Colchon Relax–Fuenlabrada	42	
188	Germán Nieto	Spain	Colchon Relax–Fuenlabrada	138	
189	José Manuel Vázquez	Spain	Colchon Relax–Fuenlabrada	69	
191	Paolo Savoldelli	Italy	Saeco	DNF	
192	Salvatore Commesso	Italy	Saeco	135	
193	Biagio Conte	Italy	Saeco	DNF	
194	Alessio Galletti	Italy	Saeco	DNF	
195	Jörg Ludewig	Germany	Saeco	85	
196	Torsten Nitsche	Germany	Saeco	137	
197	Pavel Padrnos	Czech Republic	Saeco	DNF	
198	Dario Pieri	Italy	Saeco	DNF	
199	Igor Pugaci	Moldova	Saeco	70	
201	Erik Zabel	Germany	Team Telekom	86	
202	Rolf Aldag	Germany	Team Telekom	59	
203	Alberto Elli	Italy	Team Telekom	39	
204	Danilo Hondo	Germany	Team Telekom	93	
205	Kai Hundertmarck	Germany	Team Telekom	94	
206	Andreas Klier	Germany	Team Telekom	119	
207	Jan Schaffrath	Germany	Team Telekom	113	
208	Stephan Schreck	Germany	Team Telekom	92	
209	Roberto Sgambelluri	Italy	Team Telekom	63	
