= List of teams and cyclists in the 2004 Vuelta a España =

This is a list of teams and cyclists for the 2004 Vuelta a España.

Liberty Seguros
LST
Comunidad Valenciana–Kelme
KEL
Ag2r Prévoyance
A2R

1	Roberto Heras	Spain
2	Isidro Nozal	Spain
3	René Andrle	Czech Republic
4	Giampaolo Caruso	Italy
5	Koldo Gil	Spain
6	Igor G. de Galdeano	Spain
7	Jan Hruška	Czech Republic
8	Marcos Serrano	Spain
9	Dariusz Baranowski	Poland
Sports directors: Manuel Saiz and Marino Lejarreta

11	Alejandro Valverde	Spain
12	David Blanco	Spain
13	Francisco Cabello	Spain
14	Carlos García Quesada	Spain
15	Eladio Jiménez	Spain
16	José Juliá	Spain
17	David Latasa	Spain
18	Javier Pascual Rodríguez	Spain
19	Rubén Plaza	Spain
Sports directors: Vicente Belda and José Ignacio Labarta

21	Mikel Astarloza	Spain
22	Stéphane Bergès	France
23	Íñigo Chaurreau	Spain
24	Andy Flickinger	France
25	Stéphane Goubert	France
26	Nicolas Inaudi	France
27	Christophe Oriol	France
28	Erki Pütsep	Estonia
29	Julien Laidoun	France
Sports directors: Laurent Biondi and Artūras Kasputis

Alessio–Bianchi
ALS
Cafés Baqué
BAQ
Cofidis–
Le Crédit par Téléphone
COF

31	Pietro Caucchioli	Italy
32	Angelo Furlan	Italy
33	Martin Hvastija	Slovenia
34	Ruslan Ivanov	Moldova
35	Vladimir Miholjević	Croatia
36	Claus Michael Møller	Denmark
37	Cristian Moreni	Italy
38	Ellis Rastelli	Italy
39	Scott Sunderland	Australia
Sports director: Dario Mariuzzo

41	Félix Cárdenas	Colombia
42	Pedro Arreitunandía	Spain
43	Hernán Buenahora	Colombia
44	Francisco Tomás García	Spain
45	Heberth Gutiérrez	Colombia
46	Iván Parra	Colombia
47	David Plaza	Spain
48	Aitor Pérez Arrieta	Spain
49	Ricardo Serrano	Spain
Sports director: Jon Cengotitabengoa

51	Daniel Atienza	Spain
52	Íñigo Cuesta	Spain
53	Bingen Fernández	Spain
54	Stuart O'Grady	Australia
55	Luis Pérez	Spain
56	Arnaud Coyot	France
57	Guido Trentin	Italy
58	Cédric Vasseur	France
59	Matthew White	Australia
Sports directors: Francis van Londersele and Benard Quillen

Euskaltel–Euskadi
EUS
Fassa Bortolo
FAS
Illes Balears–Banesto
IBB

61	Haimar Zubeldia	Spain
62	Joseba Albizu	Spain
63	Mikel Artetxe	Spain
64	Iñaki Isasi	Spain
65	Roberto Laiseka	Spain
66	Alberto López de Munain	Spain
67	Samuel Sánchez	Spain
68	Aitor Silloniz	Spain
69	Josu Silloniz	Spain
Sports directors: Julián Gorospe and Miguel Madariaga

71	Aitor González	Spain
72	Alessandro Petacchi	Italy
73	Dario Cioni	Italy
74	Guido Trenti	United States
75	Julián Sánchez Pimienta	Spain
76	Fabio Sacchi	Italy
77	Volodymyr Hustov	Ukraine
78	Alberto Ongarato	Italy
79	Marco Velo	Italy
Sports directors: Alessandro Giannelli and Alberto Volpi

81	Francisco Mancebo	Spain
82	Denis Menchov	Russia
83	José Luis Arrieta	Spain
84	Antonio Colóm	Spain
85	José Vicente García Acosta	Spain
86	Joan Horrach	Spain
87	Pablo Lastras	Spain
88	Unai Osa	Spain
89	Mikel Pradera	Spain
Sports directors: Eusebio Unzué and José Luis Jaimerena

Lampre
LAM
Costa de Almería–Paternina
ALM
Phonak Hearing System
PHO

91	Francesco Casagrande (*)	Italy
92	Igor Astarloa	Spain
93	Simone Bertoletti	Italy
94	Alessandro Cortinovis	Italy
95	Juan Manuel Gárate	Spain
96	Mariano Piccoli	Italy
97	Manuel Quinziato	Italy
98	Michele Scotto	Italy
99	Daniele Righi	Italy
Sports directors: Fabrizio Bontempi and Mauricio Piovani

101	Ion del Río	Spain
102	David Fernández	Spain
103	Carlos R. Golbano (*)	Spain
104	Jorge Ferrío	Spain
105	José Ángel Gómez Marchante	Spain
106	Francisco José Lara	Spain
107	David Herrero	Spain
108	Joaquín López	Spain
109	Carlos Torrent	Spain
Sports directors: Miguel Moreno and Juan Martínez Oliver

111	Óscar Sevilla	Spain
112	Tyler Hamilton	United States
113	Gonzalo Bayarri	Spain
114	Santos González	Spain
115	Bert Grabsch	Germany
116	José Enrique Gutiérrez	Spain
117	Nicolas Jalabert	France
118	Santiago Pérez	Spain
119	Tadej Valjavec	Slovenia
Sports directors: Álvaro Pino and Jacques Michaud

Quick Step–Davitamon
QSD
Rabobank
RAB
Colchón Relax–Bodysol
REB

121	José A. Pecharromán	Spain
122	László Bodrogi	Hungary
123	José Garrido	Spain
124	Pedro Horrillo	Spain
125	Kevin Hulsmans	Belgium
126	Luca Paolini	Italy
127	Patrik Sinkewitz	Germany
128	Bram Tankink	Netherlands
129	Jurgen Van Goolen	Belgium
Sports directors: Wilfried Peeters and Serge Parsani

131	Óscar Freire	Spain
132	Jan Boven	Netherlands
133	Kevin De Weert	Belgium
134	Maarten den Bakker	Netherlands
135	Robert Hunter	South Africa
136	Ronald Mutsaars	Netherlands
137	Joost Posthuma	Netherlands
138	Pieter Weening	Netherlands
139	Thorwald Veneberg	Netherlands
Sports directors: Erik Breukink and Frans Maassen

141	José Alberto Martínez	Spain
142	José Miguel Elías	Spain
143	Xavier Florencio	Spain
144	Josep Jufré	Spain
145	Nácor Burgos	Spain
146	Luis Pasamontes	Spain
147	José Luis Rebollo	Spain
148	Bert Roesems	Belgium
149	Johan van Summeren	Belgium
Sports directors: José María Pérez and Jesús Suárez Cueva

Saeco
SAE
Saunier Duval–Prodir
SDV
Team CSC
CSC

151	Damiano Cunego	Italy
152	Danilo Di Luca	Italy
153	Paolo Fornaciari	Italy
154	Juan Fuentes	Spain
155	Marius Sabaliauskas	Lithuania
156	Giosuè Bonomi	Italy
157	Eddy Mazzoleni	Italy
158	Alessandro Spezialetti	Italy
159	Sylwester Szymyd	Poland
Sports directors: Giuseppe Martinelli and Guido Bontempi

161	Joseba Beloki	Spain
162	David Cañada	Spain
163	Rafael Casero	Spain
164	Juan Carlos Domínguez	Spain
165	Fabian Jeker	Switzerland
166	M.A. Martín Perdiguero	Spain
167	Leonardo Piepoli	Italy
168	Joaquim Rodríguez	Spain
169	Constantino Zaballa	Spain
Sports directors: Vittorio Algeri and Matteo Algeri

171	Carlos Sastre	Spain
172	Thomas Bruun Eriksen	Denmark
173	Manuel Calvente	Spain
174	Vladimir Gusev	Russia
175	Jörg Jaksche	Germany
176	Peter Luttenberger	Austria
177	Frank Høj	Denmark
178	Fränk Schleck	Luxembourg
179	Brian Vandborg	Denmark
Sports directors: Johnny Weltz and Sean Yates

T-Mobile Team
TMO
US Postal Service–Berry Floor
USP
Vini Caldirola–
Nobili Rubinetterie
VIN

181	Alexander Vinokourov	Kazakhstan
182	Santiago Botero	Colombia
183	Cadel Evans	Australia
184	Torsten Hiekmann	Germany
185	Andreas Klier	Germany
186	Tomáš Konečný	Czech Republic
187	Stephan Schreck	Germany
188	Steffen Wesemann	Germany
189	Erik Zabel	Germany
Sports directors: Mario Kummer and Giovanni Fidanza

191	Michael Barry	Canada
192	Manuel Beltrán	Spain
193	Benoît Joachim	Luxembourg
194	Floyd Landis	United States
195	Guennadi Mikhailov	Russia
196	Víctor Hugo Peña	Colombia
197	Antonio Cruz	United States
198	Max van Heeswijk	Netherlands
199	David Zabriskie	United States
Sports directors: Johan Bruyneel and Dirk Demol

201	Stefano Garzelli	Italy
202	Dario Andriotto	Italy
203	Patrick Calcagni	Switzerland
204	Mauro Gerosa	Italy
205	Marco Milesi	Italy
206	Roberto Sgambelluri	Italy
207	Marco Zanotti	Italy
208	Pavel Tonkov	Russia
209	Steve Zampieri	Switzerland
Sports directors: Paolo Dotti and Valerio Tebaldi

(*) Declared not fit to start before the Tour.
