= List of teams and cyclists in the 2005 Vuelta a España =

This is a list of teams and cyclists for the 2005 Vuelta a España.

Liberty Seguros–Würth team
(Spain) SLW
Phonak Hearing Systems
(Switzerland) PHO
Illes Balears-Caisse D'Epargne
(Spain) IBA

1	Roberto Heras	(Spain)
2	Dariusz Baranowski	(Poland)
3	Joseba Beloki	(Spain)
4	Igor González de Galdeano	(Spain)
5	Giampaolo Caruso	(Italy)
6	Isidro Nozal	(Spain)
7	Michele Scarponi	(Italy)
8	Marcos Serrano	(Spain)
9	Ángel Vicioso	(Spain)
Sports directors: Manolo Sáiz and Pablo Antón Idroquilis

11	Santiago Botero	(Colombia)
12	Martin Elmiger	(Switzerland)
13	Santos González	(Spain)
14	Ignacio Gutierrez	(Spain)
15	José Enrique Gutiérrez	(Spain)
16	Floyd Landis	(United States)
17	Miguel Ángel Martín Perdiguero	(Spain)
18	Víctor Hugo Peña	(Colombia)
19	Óscar Pereiro	(Spain)
Sports directors: John Lelangue and Jacques Michaud

21	Francisco Mancebo	(Spain)
22	José Vicente Garcia Acosta	(Spain)
23	Iván Gutiérrez	(Spain)
24	Joan Horrach	(Spain)
25	Francisco Perez	(Spain)
26	Pablo Lastras	(Spain)
27	Mikel Pradera	(Spain)
28	Aitor Osa	(Spain)
29	Unai Osa	(Spain)
Sports directors: José-Miguel Echávarri and Eusebio Unzué

Bouygues Télécom
(France) BTL
Comunitat Valenciana
(Spain) CMV
Cofidis -
Le Crédit par Téléphone
(France) COF

31	Anthony Charteau	(France)
32	Sébastien Chavanel	(France)
33	Yohann Gène	(France)
34	Pierrick Fédrigo	(France)
35	Anthony Geslin	(France)
36	Christophe Kern	(France)
37	Franck Rénier	(France)
38	Thomas Voeckler	(France)
39	Unai Yus Kejereta	(Spain)
Sports director: Jean-René Bernaudeau and Dominique Arnould

41	Ángel Casero	(Spain)
42	David Bernabeu	(Spain)
43	David Blanco	(Spain)
44	Adolfo Garcia Quesada	(Spain)
45	Carlos García Quesada	(Spain)
46	Eladio Jiménez	(Spain)
47	David Latasa	(Spain)
48	Javier Pascual Rodríguez	(Spain)
49	Rubén Plaza	(Spain)
Sports director: Jose Luis Aznar Unzu and Vicente Belda

51	Daniel Atienza	(Spain)
52	Leonardo Bertagnolli	(Italy)
53	Jimmy Casper	(France)
54	Arnaud Coyot	(France)
55	Bingen Fernández	(Spain)
56	Christophe Edaleine	(France)
57	Hervé Duclos-Lassalle	(France)
58	Luis Perez	(Spain)
59	Staf Scheirlinckx	(Belgium)
Sports directors: Stéphane Champetier and Francis van Londersele

Crédit Agricole
(France) C.A
Davitamon–Lotto
(Belgium) DVL
Discovery Channel
(United States) DSC

61	Francesco Bellotti	(Italy)
62	Alexander Bocharov	(Russia)
63	Julian Dean	(New Zealand)
64	Thor Hushovd	(Norway)
65	Sébastien Joly	(France)
66	Christophe Le Mével	(France)
67	Eric Leblacher	(France)
68	Benoît Poilvet	(France)
69	Nicolas Vogondy	(France)
Sports directors: Roger Legeay and Serge Beucherie

71	Mauricio Alberto Ardila Cano	(Colombia)
72	Bart Dockx	(Belgium)
73	Nick Gates	(Australia)
74	Mario Aerts	(Belgium)
75	Koos Moerenhout	(Netherlands)
76	Gert Steegmans	(Belgium)
77	Tom Steels	(Belgium)
78	Léon van Bon	(Netherlands)
79	Preben Van Hecke	(Belgium)
Sports directors: Geert Coeman and Marc Sergeant

81	José Azevedo	(Portugal)
82	Manuel Beltrán	(Spain)
83	Tom Danielson	(United States)
84	Stijn Devolder	(Belgium)
85	Leif Hoste	(Belgium)
86	Benoît Joachim	(Luxembourg)
87	Benjamín Noval	(Spain)
88	Michael Barry	(Canada)
89	Max van Heeswijk	(Netherlands)
Sports directors: Johan Bruyneel and Dirk Demol

Domina Vacanze
(Italy) DOM
Euskaltel–Euskadi
(Spain) EUS
Fassa Bortolo
(Italy) FAS

91	Simone Cadamuro	(Italy)
92	Alessandro Cortinovis	(Italy)
93	Matej Jurčo	(Slovakia)
94	Angelo Furlan	(Italy)
95	Sergio Ghisalberti	(Italy)
96	Ruslan Ivanov	(Moldova)
97	Mirco Lorenzetto	(Italy)
98	Rafael Nuritdinov	(Uzbekistan)
99	Luca Solari	(Italy)
Sports directors: Gianluigi Stanga and Antonio Bevilacqua

101	Gonzalez Jimenez	(Spain)
102	Markel Irizar	(Spain)
103	Gorka González	(Spain)
104	Roberto Laiseka	(Spain)
105	David Lopez	(Spain)
106	Egoi Martínez	(Spain)
107	Iban Mayo	(Spain)
108	Aketza Peña	(Spain)
109	Samuel Sánchez	(Spain)
Sports directors: Miguel Madariaga and Julián Gorospe

111	Fabio Baldato	(Italy)
112	Juan Antonio Flecha	(Spain)
113	Lorenzo Bernucci	(Italy)
114	Alberto Ongarato	(Italy)
115	Alessandro Petacchi	(Italy)
116	Fabio Sacchi	(Italy)
117	Julián Sánchez	(Spain)
118	Matteo Tosatto	(Italy)
119	Marco Velo	(Italy)
Sports directors: Álvaro Pino and Jacques Michaud

Française des Jeux
(France) FDJ
Team Gerolsteiner
(Germany) GST
Lampre–Caffita
(Italy) LAM

121	Ludovic Auger	(France)
122	Frédéric Guesdon	(France)
123	Bernhard Eisel	(Austria)
124	Frédéric Finot	(France)
125	Bradley McGee	(Australia)
126	Ian McLeod	(South Africa)
127	Jérémy Roy	(France)
128	Benoît Vaugrenard	(France)
129	Jussi Veikkanen	(Finland)
Sports directors: Marc Madiot and Martial Gayant

131	René Haselbacher	(Austria)
132	Heinrich Haussler	(Germany)
133	Sven Montgomery	(Switzerland)
134	Volker Ordowski	(Germany)
135	Uwe Peschel	(Germany)
136	Matthias Russ	(Germany)
137	Torsten Schmidt	(Germany)
138	Marcel Strauss	(Switzerland)
139	Thomas Ziegler	(Germany)
Sports directors: Renate Holczer and Hans Michael Holczer

141	Gilberto Simoni	(Italy)
142	Giosuè Bonomi	(Italy)
143	Giuliano Figueras	(Italy)
144	Juan Manuel Fuentes	(Spain)
145	Gerrit Glomser	(Austria)
146	Marco Marzano	(Italy)
147	Andreas Matzbacher	(Austria)
148	Sylvester Szmyd	(Poland)
149	Francisco Javier Vila Errandonea	(Spain)
Sports directors: Giuseppe Saronni and Claudio Corti

Liquigas-Bianchi
(Italy) LIQ
Quick-Step–Innergetic
(Belgium) QST
Rabobank
(Netherlands) RAB

151	Magnus Bäckstedt	(Sweden)
152	Patrick Calcagni	(Switzerland)
153	Mauro Gerosa	(Italy)
154	Marcus Ljungqvist	(Sweden)
155	Devis Miorin	(Italy)
156	Oscar Mason	(Italy)
157	Matej Mugerli	(Slovenia)
158	Charlie Wegelius	(United Kingdom)
159	Marco Zanotti	(Italy)
Sports directors: Giuseppe Martinelli and Guido Bontempi

161	Paolo Bettini	(Italy)
162	Tom Boonen	(Belgium)
163	Kevin De Weert	(Belgium)
164	José Antonio Garrido	(Spain)
165	Juan Miguel Mercado	(Spain)
166	Jurgen Van Goolen	(Belgium)
167	José Antonio Pecharromán	(Spain)
168	Guido Trenti	(United States)
169	Rik Verbrugghe	(Belgium)
Sports directors: Patrick Lefevere and Wilfried Peeters

171	Denis Menchov	(Russia)
172	Jan Boven	(Netherlands)
173	Bram de Groot	(Netherlands)
174	Mathew Hayman	(Australia)
175	Pedro Horrillo	(Spain)
176	Aleksandr Kolobnev	(Russia)
177	Niels Scheuneman	(Netherlands)
178	Jukka Vastaranta	(Finland)
179	Thorwald Veneberg	(Netherlands)
Sports directors: Theo De Rooy and Erik Breukink

Relax Fuenlabrada
(Spain) REX
Saunier Duval–Prodir
(Spain) SDV
Team CSC
(Denmark) CSC

181	Nácor Burgos	(Spain)
182	Moisés Dueñas	(Spain)
183	Jose Miguel Elias	(Spain)
184	Xavier Florencio	(Spain)
185	Jorge Garcia	(Spain)
186	Josep Jufré	(Spain)
187	Óscar Laguna	(Spain) NP
188	Luis Pasamontes	(Spain)
189	Fredy González	(Colombia)
Sports directors: Jesús Suárez Cueva

191	David Cañada	(Spain)
192	Ángel Gómez	(Spain)
193	Íñigo Cuesta	(Spain)
194	David de la Fuente	(Spain)
195	Rafael Casero	(Spain)
196	Leonardo Piepoli	(Italy)
197	Joaquim Rodríguez	(Spain)
198	Francisco Ventoso	(Spain)
199	Constantino Zaballa	(Spain)
Sports directors: Mauro Gianetti and Joxean Fernandez Matxin

201	Carlos Sastre	(Spain)
202	Manuel Calvente	(Spain)
203	Linus Gerdemann	(Germany)
204	Allan Johansen	(Denmark)
205	Giovanni Lombardi	(Italy)
206	Andrea Peron	(Italy)
207	Jakob Piil	(Denmark)
208	Nicki Sørensen	(Denmark)
209	Christian Vande Velde	(United States)
Sports directors: Bjarne Riis and Kim Andersen

T-Mobile Team
(Germany) TMO

211	Óscar Sevilla	(Spain)
212	Rolf Aldag	(Germany)
213	Marcus Burghardt	(Germany)
214	André Korff	(Germany)
215	Andreas Klier	(Germany)
216	Bernhard Kohl	(Austria)
217	Francisco José Lara	(Spain)
218	Daniele Nardello	(Italy)
219	Erik Zabel	(Germany)
Sports directors: Walter Godefroot and Olaf Ludwig
