= 2003 Volta a Catalunya =

Race details
- Dates: 16–22 June 2003
- Stages: 7
- Distance: 887.9 km (551.7 mi)
- Winning time: 22h 15' 13"

Results
	Winner	José Antonio Pecharromán (ESP)	(Paternina–Costa de Almería)
	Second	Roberto Heras (ESP)	(U.S. Postal Service)
	Third	Koldo Gil (ESP)	(ONCE–Eroski)
	Points	Ángel Vicioso (ESP)	(ONCE–Eroski)
	Mountains	Michael Rasmussen (DEN)	(Rabobank)
	Sprints	Josep Jufré (ESP)	(Colchon Relax–Fuenlabrada)
	Team	Paternina–Costa de Almería	

The 2003 Volta a Catalunya was the 83rd edition of the Volta a Catalunya cycle race and was held from 16 June to 22 June 2003. The race started in Salou and finished in Barcelona. The race was won by José Antonio Pecharromán of the Paternina–Costa de Almería team.

== Teams ==
Fifteen teams of up to eight riders started the race:

- U.S. Postal Service
- ONCE–Eroski
- Fassa Bortolo
- Kelme–Costa Blanca
- Team Telekom
- Vini Caldirola–So.di
- iBanesto.com
- Rabobank
- Cofidis
- Euskaltel–Euskadi
- Gerolsteiner
- Colchon Relax–Fuenlabrada
- Paternina–Costa de Almería
- Labarca 2–Cafés Baqué
- Lokomotiv

== Route ==
Stage characteristics and winners
Stage	Date	Course	Distance	Type	Winner
1	16 June	Salou to Vila-seca	26.7 km (16.6 mi)	Team time trial	ONCE–Eroski
2	17 June	Móra d'Ebre to El Morell	183.6 km (114.1 mi)		Bram de Groot (NED)
3	18 June	La Pobla de Mafumet to Andorra (Els Cortals d'Encamp)	216.6 km (134.6 mi)		Aitor Kintana (ESP)
4	19 June	Andorra la Vella to Llívia	157.4 km (97.8 mi)		Jesús Manzano (ESP)
5	20 June	Llívia to Manresa	166.3 km (103.3 mi)		Óscar Freire (ESP)
6	21 June	Molins de Rei to Vallvidrera	13.1 km (8.1 mi)	Individual time trial	José Antonio Pecharromán (ESP)
7	22 June	Sant Joan Despí to Barcelona (La Pedrera)	128 km (79.5 mi)		Ángel Vicioso (ESP)

== Stages ==
=== Stage 1 ===
16 June 2003 - Salou to Vila-seca, 26.7 km (16.6 mi) (TTT)

Rank	Team	Time
1	ONCE–Eroski	25' 32"
2	U.S. Postal Service	+ 3"
3	Rabobank	+ 13"

=== Stage 2 ===
17 June 2003 - Móra d'Ebre to El Morell, 183.6 km (114.1 mi)

Rank	Rider	Team	Time
1	Bram de Groot (NED)	Rabobank	4h 21' 25"
2	Ángel Vicioso (ESP)	ONCE–Eroski	+ 1"
3	George Hincapie (USA)	U.S. Postal Service	s.t.

=== Stage 3 ===
18 June 2003 - La Pobla de Mafumet to Andorra (Els Cortals d'Encamp), 216.6 km (134.6 mi)

Rank	Rider	Team	Time
1	Aitor Kintana (ESP)	Labarca 2–Cafés Baqué	5h 50' 48"
2	Michael Rasmussen (DEN)	Rabobank	+ 2' 00"
3	José Antonio Pecharromán (ESP)	Paternina–Costa de Almería	+ 2' 09"

=== Stage 4 ===
19 June 2003 - Andorra la Vella to Llívia, 157.4 km (97.8 mi)

Rank	Rider	Team	Time
1	Jesús Manzano (ESP)	Kelme–Costa Blanca	4h 17' 55"
2	René Haselbacher (AUT)	Gerolsteiner	+ 12"
3	Matthias Kessler (GER)	Team Telekom	s.t.

=== Stage 5 ===
20 June 2003 - Llívia to Manresa, 166.3 km (103.3 mi)

Rank	Rider	Team	Time
1	Óscar Freire (ESP)	Rabobank	3h 46' 37"
2	Ángel Vicioso (ESP)	ONCE–Eroski	s.t.
3	René Haselbacher (AUT)	Gerolsteiner	s.t.

=== Stage 6 ===
21 June 2003 - Molins de Rei to Vallvidrera, 13.1 km (8.1 mi) (ITT)

Rank	Rider	Team	Time
1	José Antonio Pecharromán (ESP)	Paternina–Costa de Almería	21' 49"
2	Roberto Heras (ESP)	U.S. Postal Service	+ 52"
3	Santiago Botero (COL)	Team Telekom	+ 58"

=== Stage 7 ===
22 June 2003 - Sant Joan Despí to Barcelona (La Pedrera), 128 km (80 mi)

Rank	Rider	Team	Time
1	Ángel Vicioso (ESP)	ONCE–Eroski	2h 08' 00"
2	George Hincapie (USA)	U.S. Postal Service	s.t.
3	Matthias Kessler (GER)	Team Telekom	s.t.

== General classification ==
Final general classification

Rank	Rider	Team	Time
1	José Antonio Pecharromán (ESP)	Paternina–Costa de Almería	22h 15' 13"
2	Roberto Heras (ESP)	U.S. Postal Service	+ 43"
3	Koldo Gil (ESP)	ONCE–Eroski	+ 3' 46"
4	Rafael Casero (ESP)	Paternina–Costa de Almería	+ 4' 02"
5	Ivan Basso (ITA)	Fassa Bortolo	+ 4' 29"
6	Benjamín Noval (ESP)	Colchon Relax–Fuenlabrada	+ 4' 36"
7	Guido Trentin (ITA)	Cofidis	+ 4' 39"
8	Santiago Blanco (ESP)	Colchon Relax–Fuenlabrada	+ 5' 28"
9	Daniel Atienza (ESP)	Cofidis	+ 5' 45"
10	Evgeni Petrov (RUS)	iBanesto.com	+ 5' 55"
