= List of teams and cyclists in the 2000 Tour de France =

List of cyclists

For the 2000 Tour de France, the following 17 teams were automatically selected based on their UCI rankings. In addition, three teams were given wildcards by the Tour organisation. Each of these 20 teams sent 9 cyclists, for a total of 180:

== Teams ==
Qualified teams

- U.S. Postal Service
- Banesto
- Mapei–Quick-Step
- Rabobank
- ONCE–Deutsche Bank
- Team Telekom
- Mercatone Uno–Albacom
- AG2R Prévoyance
- Saeco–Valli & Valli
- Festina
- Farm Frites
- Cofidis
- Lotto–Adecco
- Française des Jeux
- Team Polti
- Crédit Agricole
- Vini Caldirola–Sidermec

Invited teams

- Kelme–Costa Blanca
- Memory Card–Jack & Jones
- Bonjour

== Cyclists ==
=== By starting number ===
Legend
No.	Starting number worn by the rider during the Tour
Pos.	Position in the general classification
DNF	Denotes a rider who did not finish

No.	Name	Nationality	Team	Pos.	Ref
~~1~~	~~Lance Armstrong~~	~~United States~~	~~U.S. Postal Service~~	~~1~~	
2	Frankie Andreu	United States	U.S. Postal Service	110	
3	Viatcheslav Ekimov	Russia	U.S. Postal Service	55	
4	Tyler Hamilton	United States	U.S. Postal Service	25	
5	George Hincapie	United States	U.S. Postal Service	65	
6	Benoît Joachim	Luxembourg	U.S. Postal Service	92	
7	Steffen Kjærgaard	Norway	U.S. Postal Service	89	
8	Kevin Livingston	United States	U.S. Postal Service	37	
9	Cédric Vasseur	France	U.S. Postal Service	52	
11	Alex Zülle	Switzerland	Banesto	DNF	
12	José Luis Arrieta	Spain	Banesto	57	
13	Dariusz Baranowski	Poland	Banesto	30	
14	José Vicente García	Spain	Banesto	53	
15	José María Jiménez	Spain	Banesto	23	
16	Francisco Mancebo	Spain	Banesto	9	
17	Jon Odriozola	Spain	Banesto	47	
18	Leonardo Piepoli	Italy	Banesto	DNF	
19	Orlando Rodrigues	Portugal	Banesto	87	
21	Fernando Escartín	Spain	Kelme–Costa Blanca	8	
22	Santiago Botero	Colombia	Kelme–Costa Blanca	7	
23	Carlos Alberto Contreras	Colombia	Kelme–Costa Blanca	DNF	
24	Roberto Heras	Spain	Kelme–Costa Blanca	5	
25	Francisco León Mane	Spain	Kelme–Costa Blanca	124	
26	Javier Otxoa	Spain	Kelme–Costa Blanca	13	
27	Javier Pascual Llorente	Spain	Kelme–Costa Blanca	31	
28	Antonio Tauler	Spain	Kelme–Costa Blanca	63	
29	José Ángel Vidal	Spain	Kelme–Costa Blanca	50	
31	Michele Bartoli	Italy	Mapei–Quick-Step	DNF	
32	Manuel Beltrán	Spain	Mapei–Quick-Step	11	
33	Paolo Bettini	Italy	Mapei–Quick-Step	DNF	
34	Chann McRae	United States	Mapei–Quick-Step	DNF	
35	Daniele Nardello	Italy	Mapei–Quick-Step	10	
36	Fred Rodriguez	United States	Mapei–Quick-Step	86	
37	Tom Steels	Belgium	Mapei–Quick-Step	DNF	
38	Max van Heeswijk	Netherlands	Mapei–Quick-Step	103	
39	Stefano Zanini	Italy	Mapei–Quick-Step	80	
41	Michael Boogerd	Netherlands	Rabobank	DNF	
42	Jan Boven	Netherlands	Rabobank	DNF	
43	Erik Dekker	Netherlands	Rabobank	51	
44	Maarten den Bakker	Netherlands	Rabobank	49	
45	Marc Lotz	Netherlands	Rabobank	56	
46	Grischa Niermann	Germany	Rabobank	24	
47	Léon van Bon	Netherlands	Rabobank	DNF	
48	Marc Wauters	Belgium	Rabobank	43	
49	Markus Zberg	Switzerland	Rabobank	68	
51	Laurent Jalabert	France	ONCE–Deutsche Bank	54	
52	David Cañada	Spain	ONCE–Deutsche Bank	33	
53	David Etxebarria	Spain	ONCE–Deutsche Bank	DNF	
54	Iván Gutiérrez	Spain	ONCE–Deutsche Bank	DNF	
55	Nicolas Jalabert	France	ONCE–Deutsche Bank	DNF	
56	Peter Luttenberger	Austria	ONCE–Deutsche Bank	21	
57	Abraham Olano	Spain	ONCE–Deutsche Bank	34	
58	Miguel Ángel Peña	Spain	ONCE–Deutsche Bank	DNF	
59	Marcos-Antonio Serrano	Spain	ONCE–Deutsche Bank	DNF	
61	Jan Ullrich	Germany	Team Telekom	2	
62	Udo Bölts	Germany	Team Telekom	42	
63	Alberto Elli	Italy	Team Telekom	84	
64	Gian Matteo Fagnini	Italy	Team Telekom	104	
65	Giuseppe Guerini	Italy	Team Telekom	26	
66	Jens Heppner	Germany	Team Telekom	40	
67	Alexander Vinokourov	Kazakhstan	Team Telekom	15	
68	Steffen Wesemann	Germany	Team Telekom	DNF	
69	Erik Zabel	Germany	Team Telekom	61	
71	Marco Pantani	Italy	Mercatone Uno–Albacom	DNF	
72	Simone Borgheresi	Italy	Mercatone Uno–Albacom	114	
73	Ermanno Brignoli	Italy	Mercatone Uno–Albacom	59	
74	Fabiano Fontanelli	Italy	Mercatone Uno–Albacom	DNF	
75	Riccardo Forconi	Italy	Mercatone Uno–Albacom	70	
76	Massimo Podenzana	Italy	Mercatone Uno–Albacom	73	
77	Marcello Siboni	Italy	Mercatone Uno–Albacom	46	
78	Marco Velo	Italy	Mercatone Uno–Albacom	39	
79	Enrico Zaina	Italy	Mercatone Uno–Albacom	38	
81	Jaan Kirsipuu	Estonia	AG2R Prévoyance	DNF	
82	Christophe Agnolutto	France	AG2R Prévoyance	66	
83	Lauri Aus	Estonia	AG2R Prévoyance	DNF	
84	Pascal Chanteur	France	AG2R Prévoyance	69	
85	David Delrieu	France	AG2R Prévoyance	83	
86	Artūras Kasputis	Lithuania	AG2R Prévoyance	DNF	
87	Andrey Kivilev	Kazakhstan	AG2R Prévoyance	32	
88	Gilles Maignan	France	AG2R Prévoyance	81	
89	Benoît Salmon	France	AG2R Prévoyance	107	
91	Laurent Dufaux	Switzerland	Saeco–Valli & Valli	DNF	
92	Daniel Atienza	Spain	Saeco–Valli & Valli	29	
93	Salvatore Commesso	Italy	Saeco–Valli & Valli	72	
94	Armin Meier	Switzerland	Saeco–Valli & Valli	DNF	
95	Massimiliano Mori	Italy	Saeco–Valli & Valli	67	
96	Pavel Padrnos	Czech Republic	Saeco–Valli & Valli	85	
97	Dario Pieri	Italy	Saeco–Valli & Valli	DNF	
98	Paolo Savoldelli	Italy	Saeco–Valli & Valli	41	
99	Mario Scirea	Italy	Saeco–Valli & Valli	DNF	
101	Christophe Moreau	France	Festina	4	
102	Joseba Beloki	Spain	Festina	3	
103	Ángel Casero	Spain	Festina	DNF	
104	Félix García Casas	Spain	Festina	14	
105	Jaime Hernández Bertrán	Spain	Festina	97	
106	Pascal Lino	France	Festina	112	
107	Laurent Madouas	France	Festina	35	
108	David Plaza	Spain	Festina	DNF	
109	Marcel Wüst	Germany	Festina	DNF	
111	Sergei Ivanov	Russia	Farm Frites	DNF	
112	Andreas Klier	Germany	Farm Frites	105	
113	Servais Knaven	Netherlands	Farm Frites	109	
114	Jans Koerts	Netherlands	Farm Frites	DNF	
115	Michel Lafis	Sweden	Farm Frites	78	
116	Glenn Magnusson	Sweden	Farm Frites	91	
117	Robbie McEwen	Australia	Farm Frites	113	
118	Koos Moerenhout	Netherlands	Farm Frites	77	
119	Geert Van Bondt	Belgium	Farm Frites	118	
121	Frank Vandenbroucke	Belgium	Cofidis	DNF	
122	Laurent Desbiens	France	Cofidis	DNF	
123	Laurent Lefèvre	France	Cofidis	DNF	
124	Massimiliano Lelli	Italy	Cofidis	27	
125	Nico Mattan	Belgium	Cofidis	22	
126	Roland Meier	Switzerland	Cofidis	44	
127	David Millar	Great Britain	Cofidis	62	
128	David Moncoutié	France	Cofidis	75	
129	Chris Peers	Belgium	Cofidis	DNF	
131	Rik Verbrugghe	Belgium	Lotto–Adecco	DNF	
132	Mario Aerts	Belgium	Lotto–Adecco	28	
133	Serge Baguet	Belgium	Lotto–Adecco	121	
134	Sébastien Demarbaix	Belgium	Lotto–Adecco	88	
135	Jacky Durand	France	Lotto–Adecco	74	
136	Thierry Marichal	Belgium	Lotto–Adecco	101	
137	Kurt Van De Wouwer	Belgium	Lotto–Adecco	17	
138	Paul Van Hyfte	Belgium	Lotto–Adecco	79	
139	Geert Verheyen	Belgium	Lotto–Adecco	20	
141	Stéphane Heulot	France	Française des Jeux	DNF	
142	Frédéric Guesdon	France	Française des Jeux	116	
143	Grzegorz Gwiazdowski	Poland	Française des Jeux	106	
144	Frank Høj	Denmark	Française des Jeux	100	
145	Xavier Jan	France	Française des Jeux	76	
146	Emmanuel Magnien	France	Française des Jeux	98	
147	Christophe Mengin	France	Française des Jeux	95	
148	Sven Montgomery	Switzerland	Française des Jeux	DNF	
149	Jean-Patrick Nazon	France	Française des Jeux	DNF	
151	Richard Virenque	France	Team Polti	6	
152	Jeroen Blijlevens	Netherlands	Team Polti	DNF	
153	Rossano Brasi	Italy	Team Polti	DNF	
154	Enrico Cassani	Italy	Team Polti	DNF	
155	Mirko Crepaldi	Italy	Team Polti	94	
156	Pascal Hervé	France	Team Polti	12	
157	Rafael Mateos	Spain	Team Polti	DNF	
158	Fabio Sacchi	Italy	Team Polti	64	
159	Bart Voskamp	Netherlands	Team Polti	115	
161	Bo Hamburger	Denmark	Memory Card–Jack & Jones	36	
162	Michael Blaudzun	Denmark	Memory Card–Jack & Jones	DNF	
163	Tristan Hoffman	Netherlands	Memory Card–Jack & Jones	117	
164	Allan Johansen	Denmark	Memory Card–Jack & Jones	119	
165	Nicolaj Bo Larsen	Denmark	Memory Card–Jack & Jones	99	
166	Arvis Piziks	Latvia	Memory Card–Jack & Jones	93	
167	Martin Rittsel	Sweden	Memory Card–Jack & Jones	108	
168	Michael Sandstød	Denmark	Memory Card–Jack & Jones	DNF	
169	Jesper Skibby	Denmark	Memory Card–Jack & Jones	DNF	
171	Bobby Julich	United States	Crédit Agricole	48	
172	Magnus Bäckstedt	Sweden	Crédit Agricole	123	
173	Fabrice Gougot	France	Crédit Agricole	DNF	
174	Sébastien Hinault	France	Crédit Agricole	125	
175	Anthony Langella	France	Crédit Agricole	120	
176	Anthony Morin	France	Crédit Agricole	90	
177	Stuart O'Grady	Australia	Crédit Agricole	DNF	
178	Jonathan Vaughters	United States	Crédit Agricole	DNF	
179	Jens Voigt	Germany	Crédit Agricole	60	
181	Romāns Vainšteins	Latvia	Vini Caldirola–Sidermec	82	
182	Massimo Apollonio	Italy	Vini Caldirola–Sidermec	102	
183	Gianluca Bortolami	Italy	Vini Caldirola–Sidermec	DNF	
184	Filippo Casagrande	Italy	Vini Caldirola–Sidermec	DNF	
185	Roberto Conti	Italy	Vini Caldirola–Sidermec	16	
186	Andrej Hauptman	Slovenia	Vini Caldirola–Sidermec	DNF	
187	Zoran Klemenčič	Slovenia	Vini Caldirola–Sidermec	DNF	
188	Mauro Radaelli	Italy	Vini Caldirola–Sidermec	96	
189	Guido Trentin	Italy	Vini Caldirola–Sidermec	18	
191	Jean-Cyril Robin	France	Bonjour	19	
192	Walter Bénéteau	France	Bonjour	71	
193	Franck Bouyer	France	Bonjour	122	
194	Pascal Deramé	France	Bonjour	111	
195	Christophe Faudot	France	Bonjour	DNF	
196	Damien Nazon	France	Bonjour	126	
197	Olivier Perraudeau	France	Bonjour	127	
198	Didier Rous	France	Bonjour	45	
199	François Simon	France	Bonjour	58	

=== By team ===
U.S. Postal Service
No.	Rider	Pos.
~~1~~	~~Lance Armstrong (USA)~~	~~1~~
2	Frankie Andreu (USA)	110
3	Viatcheslav Ekimov (RUS)	55
4	Tyler Hamilton (USA)	25
5	George Hincapie (USA)	65
6	Benoît Joachim (LUX)	92
7	Steffen Kjærgaard (NOR)	89
8	Kevin Livingston (USA)	37
9	Cédric Vasseur (FRA)	52

Banesto
No.	Rider	Pos.
11	Alex Zülle (SUI)	DNF
12	José Luis Arrieta (ESP)	57
13	Dariusz Baranowski (POL)	30
14	José Vicente García (ESP)	53
15	José María Jiménez (ESP)	23
16	Francisco Mancebo (ESP)	9
17	Jon Odriozola (ESP)	47
18	Leonardo Piepoli (ITA)	DNF
19	Orlando Rodrigues (POR)	87

Kelme–Costa Blanca
No.	Rider	Pos.
21	Fernando Escartín (ESP)	8
22	Santiago Botero (COL)	7
23	Carlos Alberto Contreras (COL)	DNF
24	Roberto Heras (ESP)	5
25	Francisco Leon Mane (ESP)	124
26	Javier Otxoa (ESP)	13
27	Javier Pascual Llorente (ESP)	31
28	Antonio Tauler (ESP)	63
29	José Ángel Vidal (ESP)	50

Mapei–Quick-Step
No.	Rider	Pos.
31	Michele Bartoli (ITA)	DNF
32	Manuel Beltrán (ESP)	11
33	Paolo Bettini (ITA)	DNF
34	Chann McRae (USA)	DNF
35	Daniele Nardello (ITA)	10
36	Fred Rodriguez (USA)	86
37	Tom Steels (BEL)	DNF
38	Max van Heeswijk (NED)	103
39	Stefano Zanini (ITA)	80

Rabobank
No.	Rider	Pos.
41	Michael Boogerd (NED)	DNF
42	Jan Boven (NED)	DNF
43	Erik Dekker (NED)	51
44	Maarten den Bakker (NED)	49
45	Marc Lotz (NED)	56
46	Grischa Niermann (GER)	24
47	Léon van Bon (NED)	DNF
48	Marc Wauters (BEL)	43
49	Markus Zberg (SUI)	68

ONCE–Deutsche Bank
No.	Rider	Pos.
51	Laurent Jalabert (FRA)	54
52	David Cañada (ESP)	33
53	David Etxebarria (ESP)	DNF
54	Iván Gutiérrez (ESP)	DNF
55	Nicolas Jalabert (FRA)	DNF
56	Peter Luttenberger (AUT)	21
57	Abraham Olano (ESP)	34
58	Miguel Ángel Peña (ESP)	DNF
59	Marcos-Antonio Serrano (ESP)	DNF

Team Telekom
No.	Rider	Pos.
61	Jan Ullrich (GER)	2
62	Udo Bölts (GER)	42
63	Alberto Elli (ITA)	84
64	Gian Matteo Fagnini (ITA)	104
65	Giuseppe Guerini (ITA)	26
66	Jens Heppner (GER)	40
67	Alexander Vinokourov (KAZ)	15
68	Steffen Wesemann (GER)	DNF
69	Erik Zabel (GER)	61

Mercatone Uno–Albacom
No.	Rider	Pos.
71	Marco Pantani (ITA)	DNF
72	Simone Borgheresi (ITA)	114
73	Ermanno Brignoli (ITA)	59
74	Fabiano Fontanelli (ITA)	DNF
75	Riccardo Forconi (ITA)	70
76	Massimo Podenzana (ITA)	73
77	Marcello Siboni (ITA)	46
78	Marco Velo (ITA)	39
79	Enrico Zaina (ITA)	38

AG2R Prévoyance
No.	Rider	Pos.
81	Jaan Kirsipuu (EST)	DNF
82	Christophe Agnolutto (FRA)	66
83	Lauri Aus (EST)	DNF
84	Pascal Chanteur (FRA)	69
85	David Delrieu (FRA)	83
86	Artūras Kasputis (LIT)	DNF
87	Andrey Kivilev (KAZ)	32
88	Gilles Maignan (FRA)	81
89	Benoît Salmon (FRA)	107

Saeco–Valli & Valli
No.	Rider	Pos.
91	Laurent Dufaux (SUI)	DNF
92	Daniel Atienza (ESP)	29
93	Salvatore Commesso (ITA)	72
94	Armin Meier (SUI)	DNF
95	Massimiliano Mori (ITA)	67
96	Pavel Padrnos (CZE)	85
97	Dario Pieri (ITA)	DNF
98	Paolo Savoldelli (ITA)	41
99	Mario Scirea (ITA)	DNF

Festina
No.	Rider	Pos.
101	Christophe Moreau (FRA)	4
102	Joseba Beloki (ESP)	3
103	Ángel Casero (ESP)	DNF
104	Félix García Casas (ESP)	14
105	Jaime Hernández Bertrán (ESP)	97
106	Pascal Lino (FRA)	112
107	Laurent Madouas (FRA)	35
108	David Plaza (ESP)	DNF
109	Marcel Wüst (GER)	DNF

Farm Frites
No.	Rider	Pos.
111	Sergei Ivanov (RUS)	DNF
112	Andreas Klier (GER)	105
113	Servais Knaven (NED)	109
114	Jans Koerts (NED)	DNF
115	Michel Lafis (SWE)	78
116	Glenn Magnusson (SWE)	91
117	Robbie McEwen (AUS)	113
118	Koos Moerenhout (NED)	77
119	Geert Van Bondt (BEL)	118

Cofidis
No.	Rider	Pos.
121	Frank Vandenbroucke (BEL)	DNF
122	Laurent Desbiens (FRA)	DNF
123	Laurent Lefèvre (FRA)	DNF
124	Massimiliano Lelli (ITA)	27
125	Nico Mattan (BEL)	22
126	Roland Meier (SUI)	44
127	David Millar (GBR)	62
128	David Moncoutié (FRA)	75
129	Chris Peers (BEL)	DNF

Lotto–Adecco
No.	Rider	Pos.
131	Rik Verbrugghe (BEL)	DNF
132	Mario Aerts (BEL)	28
133	Serge Baguet (BEL)	121
134	Sébastien Demarbaix (BEL)	88
135	Jacky Durand (FRA)	74
136	Thierry Marichal (BEL)	101
137	Kurt Van De Wouwer (BEL)	17
138	Paul Van Hyfte (BEL)	79
139	Geert Verheyen (BEL)	20

Française des Jeux
No.	Rider	Pos.
141	Stéphane Heulot (FRA)	DNF
142	Frédéric Guesdon (FRA)	116
143	Grzegorz Gwiazdowski (POL)	106
144	Frank Høj (DEN)	100
145	Xavier Jan (FRA)	76
146	Emmanuel Magnien (FRA)	98
147	Christophe Mengin (FRA)	95
148	Sven Montgomery (SUI)	DNF
149	Jean-Patrick Nazon (FRA)	DNF

Team Polti
No.	Rider	Pos.
151	Richard Virenque (FRA)	6
152	Jeroen Blijlevens (NED)	DNF
153	Rossano Brasi (ITA)	DNF
154	Enrico Cassani (ITA)	DNF
155	Mirko Crepaldi (ITA)	94
156	Pascal Hervé (FRA)	12
157	Rafael Mateos (ESP)	DNF
158	Fabio Sacchi (ITA)	64
159	Bart Voskamp (NED)	115

Memory Card–Jack & Jones
No.	Rider	Pos.
161	Bo Hamburger (DEN)	36
162	Michael Blaudzun (DEN)	DNF
163	Tristan Hoffman (NED)	117
164	Allan Johansen (DEN)	119
165	Nicolaj Bo Larsen (DEN)	99
166	Arvis Piziks (LAT)	93
167	Martin Rittsel (SWE)	108
168	Michael Sandstød (DEN)	DNF
169	Jesper Skibby (DEN)	DNF

Crédit Agricole
No.	Rider	Pos.
171	Bobby Julich (USA)	48
172	Magnus Bäckstedt (SWE)	123
173	Fabrice Gougot (FRA)	DNF
174	Sébastien Hinault (FRA)	125
175	Anthony Langella (FRA)	120
176	Anthony Morin (FRA)	90
177	Stuart O'Grady (AUS)	DNF
178	Jonathan Vaughters (USA)	DNF
179	Jens Voigt (GER)	60

Vini Caldirola–Sidermec
No.	Rider	Pos.
181	Romāns Vainšteins (LAT)	82
182	Massimo Apollonio (ITA)	102
183	Gianluca Bortolami (ITA)	DNF
184	Filippo Casagrande (ITA)	DNF
185	Roberto Conti (ITA)	16
186	Andrej Hauptman (SLO)	DNF
187	Zoran Klemenčič (SLO)	DNF
188	Mauro Radaelli (ITA)	96
189	Guido Trentin (ITA)	18

Bonjour
No.	Rider	Pos.
191	Jean-Cyril Robin (FRA)	19
192	Walter Bénéteau (FRA)	71
193	Franck Bouyer (FRA)	122
194	Pascal Deramé (FRA)	111
195	Christophe Faudot (FRA)	DNF
196	Damien Nazon (FRA)	126
197	Olivier Perraudeau (FRA)	127
198	Didier Rous (FRA)	45
199	François Simon (FRA)	58
