= Francisco Gutiérrez (cyclist) =

Spanish cyclist

Personal information
- Full name: Francisco Gutiérrez Álvarez
- Born: 3 June 1980 (age 46) Barakaldo, Spain

Cycling career
- Sport: Cycling
- Current team: Retired
- Discipline: Road
- Role: Rider

Amateur teams
- 1999–2002: Cafés Baqué
- 2005–2006: Cafés Baqué

Professional team
- 2003–2004: Cafés Baqué

Francisco Gutiérrez Álvarez (born 3 June 1980) is a Spanish former racing cyclist. He notably finished second in the under-23 road race at the 2002 UCI Road World Championships and competed in the 2003 Vuelta a España

== Major results ==
2002
1st Overall Spanish Amateur Road Cycling Cup
1st Santikutz Klasika
1st Stage 5b Vuelta a Navarra
2nd Road race, UCI Under-23 Road World Championships
National Under-23 Road Championships

2nd Road race
3rd Time trial

2003
7th Clásica de Almería
2004
8th Trofeo Luis Puig
2005
1st Overall Spanish Amateur Road Cycling Cup
3rd Overall Vuelta a Navarra
2006
1st Overall Spanish Amateur Road Cycling Cup
1st Overall Vuelta a Cantabria
1st Subida a Urraki
1st Santikutz Klasika
