= Jorge García Marín =

Spanish cyclist

Personal information
- Born: 23 April 1980 (age 46) Zaragoza, Spain

Cycling career
- Sport: Cycling
- Current team: Retired
- Discipline: Road
- Role: Rider

Professional teams
- 2004: Cafés Baqué
- 2005–2007: Relax–GAM

Jorge García Marín (born 23 April 1980 in Zaragoza) is a former Spanish racing cyclist. He rode in 3 editions of the Vuelta a España.

== Palmarès ==
2004
1st Stage 4 Volta a la Comunitat Valenciana
