= César García (cyclist) =

Spanish bicycle racer

Personal information
- Full name: César García Calvo
- Born: 24 December 1974 (age 51) Ponferrada, Spain

Cycling career
- Sport: Cycling
- Current team: Retired
- Discipline: Road
- Role: Rider

Professional teams
- 1999: Recer–Boavista
- 1999–2002: Fuenlabrada
- 2003: Cafés Baqué

César García Calvo (born 24 December 1974 in Ponferrada) is a Spanish former cyclist.

== Major results ==
1996
2nd Overall Vuelta a la Comunidad de Madrid
3rd Overall Cinturón a Mallorca
1998
1st Stage 1 Cinturón a Mallorca
2000
1st Circuito de Getxo
2001
1st Sprints classification Vuelta a España
2002
1st Stage 2 Tour of the Basque Country
