= Antonio Bucciero =

Italian cyclist

Personal information
- Born: 29 April 1982 (age 44) Naples, Italy

Cycling career
- Sport: Cycling
- Current team: Retired
- Discipline: Road
- Role: Rider

Professional teams
- 2003–2004: Saeco
- 2005: Acqua & Sapone–Adria Mobil
- 2007: Ceramica Panaria–Navigare

Antonio Bucciero (born 29 April 1982 in Naples) is an Italian former cyclist.

== Palmares ==
1999
1st Grand Prix Rüebliland
2000
2nd Junior World Road Race Championships
2001
2nd Gran Premio Città di Felino
2002
1st Trofeo Franco Balestra
2nd Coppa San Geo
2003
2nd Trofeo Città di Castelfidardo
2004
1st Stage 1 Bayern Rundfahrt
2nd Philadelphia International Championship
2006
1st Gran Premio San Giuseppe
1st Trofeo Papà Cervi
2nd Trofeo Franco Balestra
2nd Coppa San Geo
