= Gian Matteo Fagnini =

Italian cyclist (born 1970)

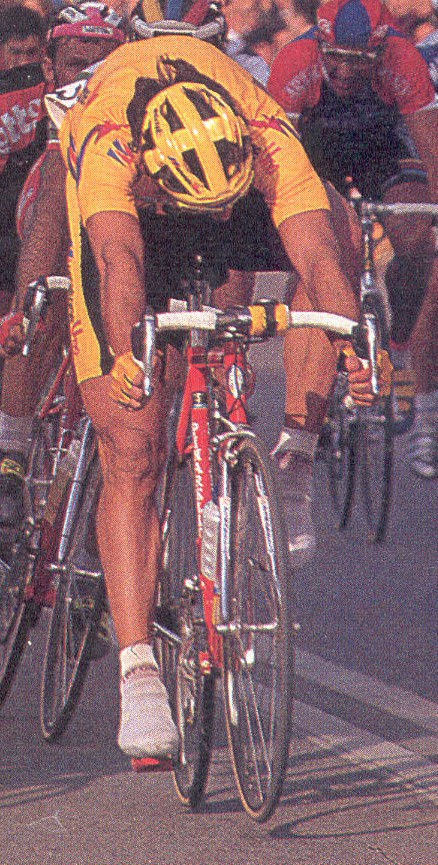
- Fagnini at the 1997 Paris–Nice

Personal information
- Full name: Gian Matteo Fagnini
- Born: 11 October 1970 (age 56) Lecco, Italy
- Height: 1.78 m (5 ft 10 in)
- Weight: 70 kg (154 lb; 11 st 0 lb)

Cycling career
- Sport: Cycling
- Discipline: Road
- Role: Rider

Professional teams
- 1994–1995: Mercatone Uno
- 1996–1999: Saeco
- 2000–2001: Deutsche Telekom
- 2002–2003: Telekom
- 2004: Domina Vacanze
- 2005: Naturino

Major wins
- Grand Tours Giro d'Italia Intergiro classification (1998) 2 stages

Gian Matteo Fanini is a former Italian professional cyclist who was born on 11 October 1970 in Lecco, Italy. He is best known for winning the Intergiro classification at the 1998 Giro d'Italia and along with winning two stages at the Giro.

== Major results ==
1991
2nd GP Capodarco
1993
1st Stage 2 GP Tell
1994
1st Stage 2 Euskal Bizikleta
1995
9th Wincanton Classic
1996
7th Clásica de Almería
1997
1st Stage 5a Volta a la Comunitat Valenciana
1998
Giro d'Italia

1st Intergiro classification
1st Stages 20 & 22

1999
8th Amstel Gold Race
2000
5th Scheldeprijs
2001
1st Rund um Köln
2003
1st Stage 2 Vuelta a Asturias
