= Alessio Galletti =

Italian cyclist (1968 – 2005)

- Galletti in 2000

Personal information
- Full name: Alessio Galletti
- Born: 26 March 1968 Cascina, Italy
- Died: 15 June 2005 (aged 37) Oviedo, Spain

Cycling career
- Sport: Cycling
- Discipline: Road
- Role: Rider

Professional teams
- 1994–1995: Lampre–Panaria
- 1996: Panaria–Vinavil
- 1997: Ros Mary
- 1998: Amore & Vita–ForzArcore
- 1999–2003: Saeco–Cannondale
- 2004: De Nardi–Piemme Telekom
- 2005: Naturino–Sapore di Mare

Alessio Galletti (26 March 1968 – 15 June 2005) was an Italian racing cyclist. He died from heart failure while he was racing in the Subida al Naranco, 15 km from the finish line. He participated in all three of the Grand Tours of cycling.

== Palmares ==
1996
10th G.P. Camaiore
10th Tre Valli Varesine
1998
1st Stage 3 Tour de l'Ain
2nd Overall Tour de l'Ain

1st Stage 3

2nd Overall Tour du Maroc
3rd G.P. Camaiore
2000
10th G.P. Camaiore
2001
1st Stage 3 Tour Down Under
2003
1st GP Fred Mengoni
9th Coppa Bernocchi

== See also ==
- List of racing cyclists and pacemakers with a cycling-related death
