= Aitor Kintana =

Spanish former cyclist

Personal information
- Full name: Aitor Kintana Zarate
- Born: 15 July 1975 (age 51) Vitoria-Gasteiz, Spain

Cycling career
- Sport: Cycling
- Current team: Retired
- Discipline: Road
- Role: Rider

Professional teams
- 1998–2000: Euskaltel–Euskadi
- 2001: Jazztel–Costa de Almería
- 2002: BigMat–Auber 93
- 2003: Labarca-2–Cafés Baqué

Aitor Kintana Zarate (born 15 July 1975 in Vitoria-Gasteiz) is a Spanish former cyclist.

== Major results ==
2000
5th Overall Tour de l'Avenir

1st Stage 8

2001
2nd Overall Vuelta a La Rioja
2002
2nd Overall Route du Sud
7th Classique des Alpes
7th Overall Critérium du Dauphiné
2003
1st Stage 3 Volta a Catalunya
