= Nicolas Inaudi =

French cyclist

Personal information
- Born: 21 January 1978 (age 48) Chambéry, France

Cycling career
- Sport: Cycling
- Current team: Retired
- Discipline: Road
- Role: Rider

Professional teams
- 2001–2004: AG2R Prévoyance
- 2005–2006: Cofidis
- 2008: Differdange–Apiflo Vacances

Nicolas Inaudi (born 21 January 1978, in Chambéry) is a French former cyclist.

== Palmares ==
2000
3rd La Côte Picarde
2004
2nd Tallinn-Tartu GP
2005
3rd Trophée des Grimpeurs
