= Jesús Manzano =

Spanish cyclist

Personal information
- Full name: Jesús Maria Manzano Ruano
- Born: 12 May 1978 (age 48) San Lorenzo de El Escorial, Spain

Cycling career
- Sport: Cycling
- Discipline: Road
- Role: Retired
- Rider type: Climber

Professional teams
- 2000–2003: Kelme–Costa Blanca
- 2004: Amore e Vita

Jesús María Manzano Ruano (San Lorenzo de El Escorial, 12 May 1978) is a former Spanish professional road racing cyclist. He is famous as the whistleblower of systematic doping within his cycling team and his statements led the Guardia Civil to conduct the Operación Puerto investigation around the sports doctor Eufemiano Fuentes.

== Cycling career ==
Manzano turned professional in 2000 with the Kelme–Costa Blanca team that he would stay with until late 2003. Manzano's first professional win came in 2001 at the Vuelta a La Rioja. That same year he rode the 2001 Giro d'Italia where he had to retire after colliding with a course motorbike. The following year he rode in both the 2002 Giro d'Italia and the 2002 Vuelta a España. Manzano did not finish the Giro nor the Vuelta but his team Kelme were successful in the latter with the overall win by Aitor González. At that time Kelme was one of the strongest Spanish teams in the Vuelta a España and won the race with Roberto Heras in 2000, Gonzalez in 2002 as well as being the runner up in 2001 with Óscar Sevilla. Manzano would have worked for the team during these races. In the Volta a Catalunya in 2003, Manzano got his second victory after an escape of 130 km. Manzano rode the 2003 Tour de France until a crash on the seventh stage (discussed below) followed by the 2003 Vuelta a España where he rode with a knee injury. Manzano stayed in the race until the 20th stage. He had been found with a woman in his bedroom the previous night which was not allowed by the team who subsequently, as has been written, fired him.

== Doping revelations ==
In March 2004 Manzano said he would expose the doping activities of his former team, Kelme, who had sacked him the previous September. In an exclusive interview with the Spanish newspaper AS, Manzano detailed the blood doping practices of his former team Kelme. Manzano said that at the end of 2002 two half litre sachets of his blood were removed in a clinic in Valencia which was intended to be transfused during the 2003 Tour de France. In addition, Manzano paid 3,000 euros before the start of the 2003 Tour de France to the team for the medical expenses as an investment to what he and the team expected would be repaid with the proceeds of a stage win or other wins. He believed that the rest of the riders on the team paid the same amount of money. On the morning of the seventh stage of the Tour, the team doctor gave him a product that he had never used before. Fifty millilitres were injected into one of his veins. On the first climb of the day, Col de Portes, Manzano and Richard Virenque attacked the peloton and got away in an attempt to bridge up to an earlier breakaway. As Virenque's teammate was ahead, Virenque did not do any of the work to get to the group. After three kilometres of the climb, Manzano began to become dizzy. Virenque attacked and got away. Manzano collapsed after a further 500 metres and was airlifted to the hospital in Belley. The Tour de France doctor who was the first medically trained person on the scene to tend to Manzano mistakenly diagnosed a heatstroke. According to Manzano, the team manager Joan Mas asked him to refuse all analysis at the hospital. Manzano would later say that the drug that was administered on the morning of the seventh stage of the Tour de France was Oxyglobin.

Manzano had a near fatal dehydration which he believed was due to the morning injection. After the Tour he began to feel depressed and no longer had a desire to race. His directeur sportif told him he had to ride the Volta a Portugal and, according to Manzano, threatened him with losing his job on the team. Several days later in Valencia Manzano received 125ml of blood from an assistant of the team doctor. Manzano said that there was no control conducted to ensure that the unlabelled blood bag was his blood and afterwards felt sick. He tried to take the train but his condition was so bad that he had to leave the train before it left the station. Again he went to the clinic where he was given Urbason.

== Aftermath ==
Immediately the Kelme team denied the allegations and Jean-Marie Leblanc the director of the Tour de France was also sceptical about the allegations. The Kelme officials dismissed his claims as revenge and Manzano did say that he wanted revenge on the team that had left him short of a month's wages and unemployed. It has been reported that by making the confessions to the As newspaper as well as selling television rights outside of Spain, Manzano earned 300,000 euros. After his confession of doping the Italian Amore e Vita cycling team offered him a place on the team.

Manzano made further revelations in a second interview with the paper where he alleged that the teams en-masse withdrawal from stage one of the Tour of Portugal in 2003 was connected to a positive doping test in the previous Tour de France and that the riders withdrew en masse to avoid being tested and subsequently caught. Manzano detailed the performance-enhancing drugs that he used which included several types of Erythropoietin (Eprex, Neorecormon, Epocrin (Russian EPO), Epomax), Human growth hormone, Cortisone, Geref (Growth Hormone Releasing Hormone), Neoferinon, Androgel (testosterone), nandrolone (for the winter), synthetic haemoglobin, Actovegin, as well as Oxyglobin. He alleged that the daily cortisone injections for his knee injury during the 2003 Vuelta a España did severe damage to his knee and he spoke of the pressure to dope in professional cycling. After the more detailed revelations, the Kelme team who had been invited to the 2004 Tour de France had their invite withdrawn.

An investigation began from the Spanish Sports Council (CSD) which was initially hindered by Gómez Angulo who tried to block the investigation due to his withdrawal of confidence for CSD's sports director and the President of the Anti-Doping Commission Guillermo Jiménez. The investigation continued with several members of the Kelme team called as for questioning in April 2004. These included Eufemiano Fuentes who was at that time the current Kelme team doctor, Walter Virú the team doctor before Fuentes, and Alfredo Córdova who was working for Liberty Seguros but was involved with Kelme in 2003 during the 2003 Tour de France, the 2003 Tour of Portugal and in Valencia when Manzano was gravely ill after a blood transfusion. The case into doping on the Kelme cycling team was eventually dropped due to lack of evidence.

Manzano's knee injury was not healing and he was not able to return to competition with the Italian Amore e Vita team.

== Operación Puerto ==
Two years after Manzano's first allegations to the international press, the Operación Puerto investigation began in early 2006 with the result of arrests in May 2006. Manzano's statements had led directly to the development of this investigation. Manzano claimed that there were other sports athletes treated by Dr.Fuentes such as soccer players, tennis players and track and field athletes. He is alleged to have said that an International footballer was associated with Fuentes and also that former World Marathon champion Abel Antón, former 5,000-metre champion Alberto Garcia and Spanish 1,500-metre athlete Reyes Estévez were in a hotel where Fuentes is claimed to have been offering consultations.

== Post Operación commentary ==
Manzano has been writing columns and has been interviewed several times since the Operación Puerto scandal as an expert on doping practices in the sport. In an article in the Spanish paper As, he told of the effects of testosterone and the different products available that can be used for doping. Later, he claimed that Alejandro Valverde doped with testosterone during the 2002 Vuelta a España and that Rolf Aldag's claim of doping being personal and not involving other riders in the team was a "big lie".

== Major results ==
2001

1st, stage Vuelta a La Rioja

2003

1st, stage Volta a Catalunya

== See also ==
- List of doping cases in cycling
- List of sportspeople sanctioned for doping offences
