= Gorka Gerrikagoitia =

Spanish cyclist

Personal information
- Full name: Gorka Gerrikagoitia Arrien
- Born: 7 December 1973 (age 52) Guernica, Spain

Cycling career
- Sport: Cycling
- Current team: Retired
- Discipline: Road
- Role: Rider

Professional team
- 1997–2003: Equipo Euskadi

Managerial team
- 2004–2013: Euskaltel–Euskadi

Gorka Gerrikagoitia Arrien (born 7 December 1973 in Guernica) is a Spanish former professional cyclist who spent his entire career on Euskaltel–Euskadi.

== Palmares ==
1996
3rd Memorial Rodriguez Iguanzo
1997
1st Clásica Memorial Txuma
2003
3rd Prueba Villafranca de Ordizia
6th Clasica San Sebastian

Grand Tour general classification results timeline

| Grand Tour | 2000 | 2001 | 2002 | 2003 |
|---|---|---|---|---|
| Giro d'Italia | — | — | — | — |
| Tour de France | — | — | — | — |
| Vuelta a España | 66 | 101 | 107 | DNF |

Legend
| — | Did not compete |
| DNF | Did not finish |
