= Francisco José Lara =

Spanish cyclist

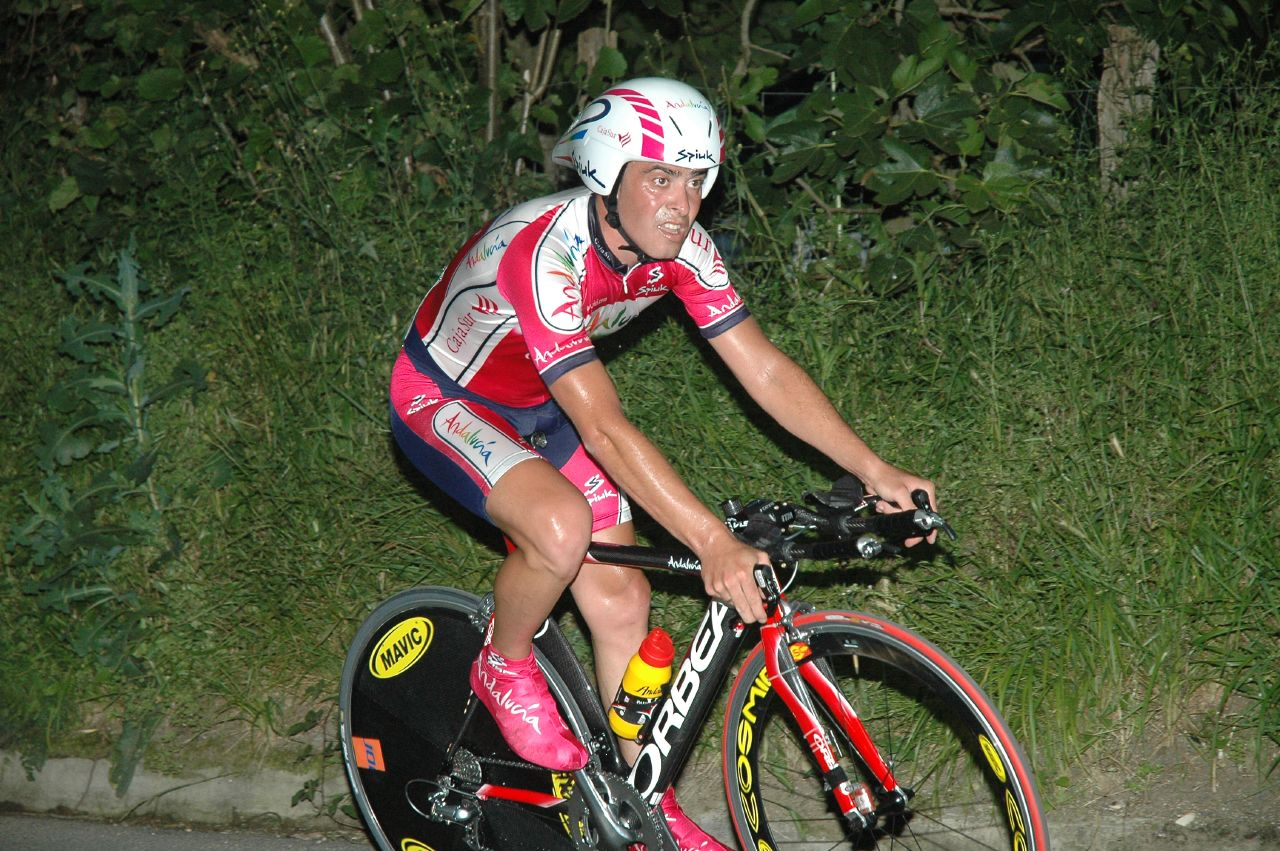

Personal information
- Full name: Francisco José Lara Ruiz
- Nickname: "Paco"
- Born: February 25, 1977 (age 49) Granada, Spain

Cycling career
- Sport: Cycling
- Discipline: Road
- Role: Rider

Professional teams
- 2001: Festina
- 2002–2003: Coast/Bianchi
- 2004: Costa de Almería-Paternina
- 2005: T-Mobile Team
- 2006–2007: Andalucía-Cajasur

Francisco José ("Paco") Lara Ruiz (born February 25, 1977, in Granada) is a Spanish professional road bicycle racer, currently without a team.

== Palmarès ==
1999
1st, Overall, Memorial Valenciaga
2000
1st, Overall, Vuelta a Cartagena
2004
3rd, Spanish national road championships
