= Manuel Calvente =

Spanish cyclist

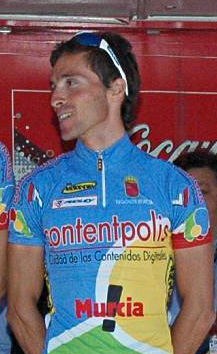

Personal information
- Full name: Manuel Calvente Gorbas
- Born: 14 August 1976 (age 50) Granada, Spain

Cycling career
- Sport: Cycling
- Current team: Retired
- Discipline: Road
- Role: Rider
- Rider type: Climber

Amateur teams
- 1999–2000: Pinturas Banaka
- 2001: Ávila Rojas

Professional teams
- 2002–2005: CSC–Tiscali
- 2006–2007: Agritubel
- 2008: Contentpolis–Murcia
- 2009–2010: Andalucía–Cajasur

Major wins
- Vuelta a La Rioja (2008)

Manuel Calvente Gorbas (born 14 August 1976 in Granada) is a Spanish former road bicycle racer, who competed professionally between 2002 and 2010 for the Team CSC, Agritubel, Contentpolis–Murcia and Andalucía–Cajasur teams.

== Major results ==
2005
22nd, Overall, Vuelta a España
2008
1st, Overall, Vuelta a La Rioja
