= Óscar Laguna =

Spanish cyclist

Personal information
- Full name: Óscar Laguna García
- Born: 21 February 1978 (age 48) Puig-reig, Spain

Cycling career
- Sport: Cycling
- Current team: Retired
- Discipline: Road
- Role: Rider

Amateur teams
- 1999: Alcosto–Fuenlabrada
- 2006–2007: Super Froiz

Professional team
- 2000–2005: Colchon Relax–Fuenlabrada

Óscar Laguna García (born 21 February 1978) is a Spanish former professional road racing cyclist. He rode in three editions of the Vuelta a España, in 2001, 2002, and 2003.

== Major results ==
2001
1st Stage 5 Volta a Catalunya
6th Overall Vuelta a Murcia
2004
1st Stage 4 Vuelta a Aragón
2006
1st Overall Vuelta a Galicia

1st Stages 3 & 5

2007
1st Overall Vuelta a Galicia
