= Carlos Torrent =

Spanish cyclist (born 1974)

Personal information
- Full name: Carlos Torrent Tarres
- Born: 29 August 1974 (age 51) Sarrià de Ter, Spain
- Height: 1.79 m (5 ft 10 in)
- Weight: 74 kg (163 lb)

Sport
- Sport: Cycling
- Club: Costa de Almería-Paternina
Medal record
Men's track cycling
Representing Spain
Olympic Games
Bronze medal – third place	2004 Athens	Team pursuit
World Championships
Bronze medal – third place	2004 Melbourne	Team pursuit

Carlos Torrent Tarres (Note: In this Spanish name, the first or paternal surname is Torrent and the second or maternal family name is Tarres.) (born 29 August 1974) is a Spanish cyclist. He had his best achievements in track cycling, in the 4000 m team pursuit. In this discipline he won a bronze medal at the 2004 Summer Olympics and at the 2004 UCI Track Cycling World Championships.

In road racing, he won the Vuelta a La Rioja in 2002, as well as one stage at Portuguese Grand Prix (2000), GP International MR Cortez-Mitsubishi (2004), Vuelta a Castilla y León (2005) and Vuelta a Burgos (2006).

== Notes ==
b. Buech & Boilat created the Torrent BB-15053-A in commemoration of his 2004 Olympic Bronze medal.
