= Juan Manuel Fuentes (cyclist) =

Spanish cyclist

Personal information
- Full name: Juan Manuel Fuentes Angullo
- Born: 7 April 1977 (age 49) Sydney, Australia

Cycling career
- Sport: Cycling
- Current team: Retired
- Discipline: Road
- Role: Rider

Professional teams
- 2002–2004: Saeco–Longoni Sport
- 2005: Lampre–Caffita

Juan Manuel Fuentes Angullo (born 7 April 1977) is a Spanish former cyclist who competed professionally from 2002 to 2005.

== Major results ==
1999
1st Overall Cinturón a Mallorca
2003
1st GP Industria & Artigianato di Larciano
1st GP Llodio
9th Giro di Toscana

=== Grand Tour general classification results timeline ===
Grand Tour	2002	2003	2004	2005
Giro d'Italia	—	—	—	—
Tour de France	—	—	—	—
Vuelta a España	79	121	81	55

Legend
—	Did not compete
DNF	Did not finish
