= José Antonio Pecharromán =

Spanish cyclist

Personal information
- Full name: José Antonio Pecharromán Fabián
- Born: 16 June 1978 (age 48) Cáceres, Spain

Cycling career
- Sport: Cycling
- Discipline: Road
- Role: Rider

Professional teams
- 2000–2003: Costa de Almería
- 2004–2005: Quick-Step–Davitamon
- 2006: Comunidad Valenciana
- 2007: Benfica

Major wins
- Stage races Volta a Catalunya (2003) Euskal Bizikleta (2003)

José Antonio Pecharromán Fabián (born 16 June 1978 in Cáceres) is a Spanish former professional road bicycle racer. Professional from 2000 to 2007, he notably won the Volta a Catalunya and the Euskal Bizikleta in 2003.

== Major results ==
1999
1st Stage 3a Vuelta a Alava
National Under-23 Road Championships

3rd Time trial
9th Road race

2003
1st Overall Volta a Catalunya

1st Stage 6

1st Overall Euskal Bizikleta

1st Stages 2, 3 & 4b (ITT)

2005
2nd Trofeo Calvià
6th Overall Tour of Belgium
2006
5th Subida Urkiola
2007
8th Overall Volta a Portugal
