= Rafael Casero =

Spanish cyclist

Personal information
- Full name: Rafael Casero Moreno
- Born: 9 October 1976 (age 50) Valencia, Spain

Cycling career
- Sport: Cycling
- Current team: Electro Hiper Europa
- Discipline: Road
- Role: Rider (retired); Directeur sportif

Professional teams
- 2000–2001: Festina
- 2002–2003: Jazztel–Costa de Almería
- 2004–2005: Saunier Duval–Prodir
- 2006: 3 Molinos Resort

Managerial teams
- 2017: Inteja Dominican Cycling Team
- 2021–: Electro Hiper Europa

Rafael Casero Moreno (born 9 October 1976 in Valencia) is a Spanish former professional road bicycle racer, who rode professionally between 2000 and 2006. The brother of Ángel Casero, Rafael Casero now works as a directeur sportif for UCI Continental team Electro Hiper Europa.

== Major results ==
2002
1st Mountains classification Tour of the Basque Country
2003
Volta a la Comunitat Valenciana

1st Mountains classification
1st Stage 2

2nd Road race, National Road Championships
4th Overall Volta a Catalunya
