= Simone Bertoletti =

Italian cyclist

Personal information
- Born: 25 August 1974 (age 52) Mantua, Italy

Cycling career
- Sport: Cycling
- Current team: Retired
- Discipline: Road
- Role: Rider

Professional teams
- 1996–1997: Gewiss–Playbus
- 1998: Brescialat–Liquigas
- 1999–2004: Lampre–Daikin
- 2005: Universal Caffé–Styloffice

Simone Bertoletti (born 25 August 1974) is a former Italian cyclist.

== Career ==
Bertoletti began his professional career in 1996 with the Gewiss–Playbus team. The following season, he received his first victory, stage 5 of the Tour de Pologne. In 1998, he rode for Brescialat–Liquigas, and, in 1999, joined Lampre–Daikin, with which he spent six years.

In 2003, Bertoletti celebrated his biggest success during the Tour de Romandie, when he won the first stage of the race. He escaped the peloton for 160 kilometres in the rain, winning the stage by over a minute. This success allowed him to wear the yellow jersey for two days.

He participated in 11 total Grand Tours: five consecutive editions of the Giro d'Italia and six consecutive editions of the Vuelta a España, from 1999 to 2004.

== Major results ==
1997
1st Stage 5 Tour de Pologne
2001
5th GP du canton d'Argovie
2003
1st Stage 1 Tour de Romandie
1st Stage 2 Settimana Internazionale di Coppi e Bartali (TTT)
8th Overall Volta ao Algarve

=== Grand Tour general classification results timeline ===
Grand Tour	1999	2000	2001	2002	2003	2004
Giro d'Italia	83	87	82	DNF	88	—
Tour de France	—	—	—	—	—	—
Vuelta a España	DNF	73	132	31	143	DNF

Legend
—	Did not compete
DNF	Did not finish
