= Jaime Hernández (cyclist) =

Spanish cyclist (born 1972)

Personal information
- Full name: Jaime Javier Hernández Bertrán
- Born: 18 January 1972 (age 54) Barcelona, Spain

Cycling career
- Sport: Cycling
- Current team: Retired
- Discipline: Road
- Role: Rider

Amateur team
- 1996: Festina–Lotus (stagiaire)

Professional teams
- 1997–2001: Festina–Lotus
- 2002–2003: Team Coast

Jaime Javier Hernández Bertrán (born 18 January 1972 in Barcelona) is a Spanish former cyclist. He rode in 5 editions of the Vuelta a España and two editions of the Tour de France.

== Major results ==
1996
3rd National Time Trial Championships
2001
9th Overall Four Days of Dunkirk
