= José Luis Rebollo =

Spanish cyclist

Personal information
- Born: 8 October 1972 (age 54)

Cycling career
- Sport: Cycling
- Role: Rider

José Luis Rebollo (born 8 October 1972) is a Spanish racing cyclist. He rode in the 1999 Tour de France.
