= Cafés Baqué =

Team information
- Registered: Spain
- Founded: 2003
- Disbanded: 2004
- Discipline: Road
- Status: UCI Professional Continental

Team name history
- 2003 2004: Labarca-2-Café Baqué; Cafés Baqué

Cafés Baqué was a Spanish cycling team established in 2003 and disbanded in 2004.

== Major wins ==
2003
Stage 3 Volta a Catalunya, Aitor Kintana
2004
Stage 4 Vuelta Ciclista a la Comunidad Valenciana, Jorge Garcia Marín
Stage 17 Vuelta a España, Félix Rafael Cardenas
