= Nácor Burgos =

Spanish cyclist

Nácor Burgos

Nácor Burgos Rojo (born April 9, 1977, in Ávila) is a professional road racing cyclist. In 2006, he rode for the Relax–GAM professional cycling team.

== Major achievements ==
2006 – Relax–GAM

- 3rd, Overall, Tour of Qinghai Lake (China, UCI Asia Tour)

2003 – Colchón Relax Fuenlabrada

- 15th, Overall, Vuelta Ciclista a la Rioja
  - 2nd, Stage 1

=== Vuelta a España record ===
- 2006: Did Not Finish (Stage 16 crash)
- 2003: 89th overall
- 2002: 35th overall
- 2000: 78th overall
