= Jan Boven =

Dutch cyclist

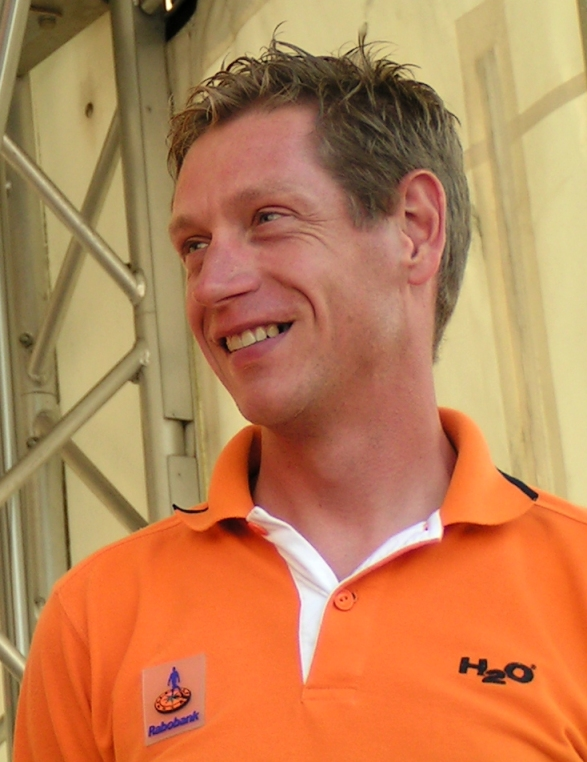
- Boven at the team presentation for the 2006 Deutschland Tour

Personal information
- Full name: Jan Boven
- Born: 28 February 1972 (age 54) Delfzijl, the Netherlands

Cycling career
- Sport: Cycling
- Discipline: Road
- Role: Rider

Professional team
- 1996–2008: Rabobank

Managerial team
- 2013–: Blanco Pro Cycling

Jan Boven (born 28 February 1972 in Delfzijl, Groningen) is a road bicycle racer from the Netherlands, who turned professional in 1996, and remained with the same team, Rabobank, until 2008.

His son, Lars Boven is a professional cyclist for UCI WorldTeam Alpecin–Premier Tech.

== Palmares ==
- Teleflex Tour Amateurs – 1 stage (1996)
- 2nd, Liège-Bastogne-Liège - Amateurs (1991–1992)
