= Saeco (cycling team) =

Italian cycling team (1996–2005)

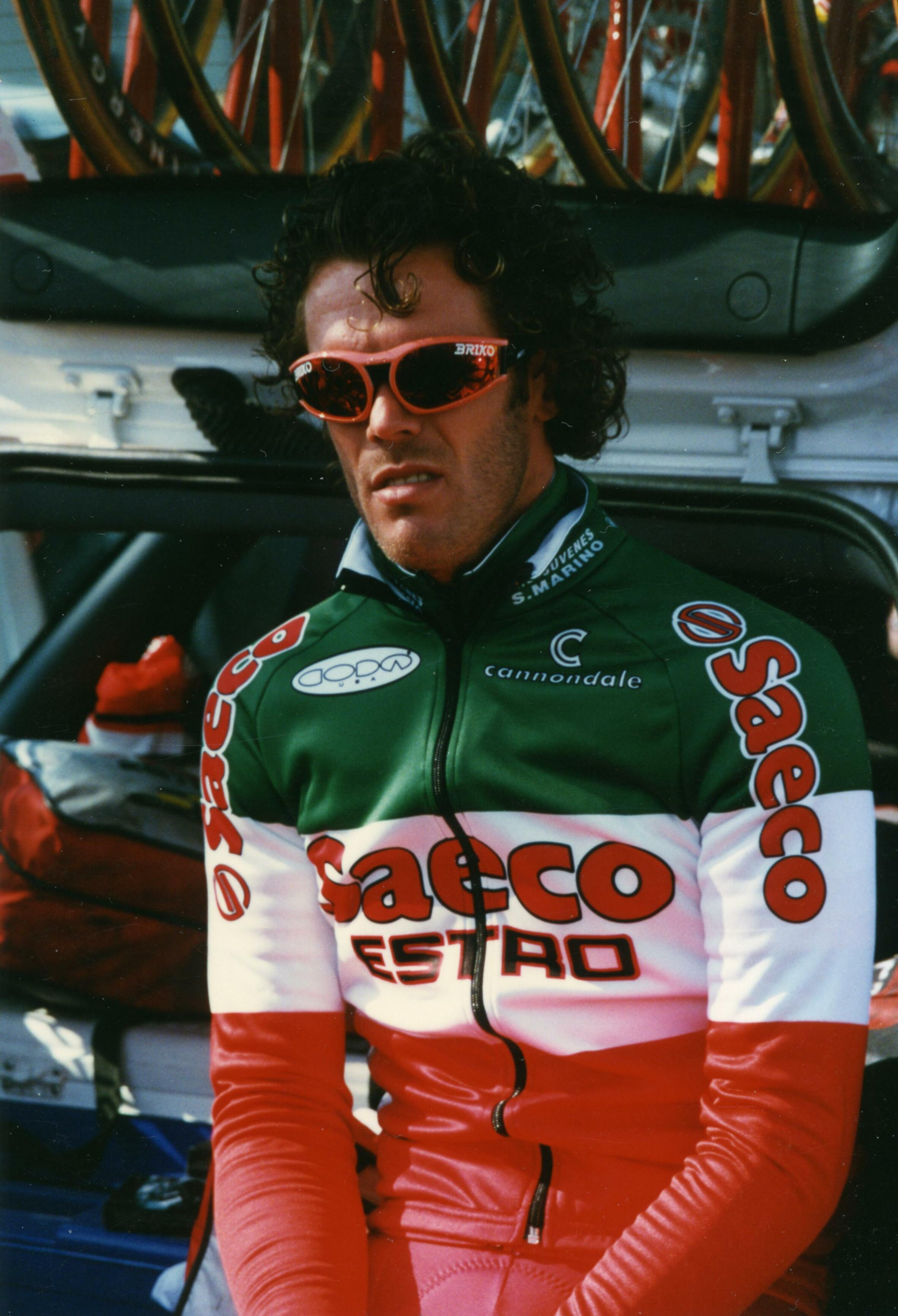

Team information
- Registered: Italy
- Founded: 1996
- Disbanded: Merged 2005
- Discipline: Road
- Bicycles: Cannondale

Team name history
- 2003–2004 2002 2001 2000 1999 1998 1997 1996: Saeco; Saeco-Longoni Sport; Saeco; Saeco-Valli & Valli; Saeco-Cannondale; Saeco-Cannondale; Saeco-Estro; Saeco-Estro-AS Juvenes San Marino

Saeco was the name of an Italian road bicycle racing team, sponsored by the company with the same name. They rode on Cannondale bicycles.

The company did not prolong the sponsorship for 2005, and the team was merged with the Lampre team, forming Lampre–Caffita, sponsored by Caffita.

== Team history ==
In the 1990s the team was famous for Mario Cipollini's sprint train and his antics. One of their most memorable moments was Cipollini's 4 consecutive stage wins in the 1999 Tour de France. The image of Mario Cipollini approaching the TV camera right after a win to say, "Cannondale makes the best bikes!" propelled Cannondale's popularity among road racers.

The Saeco team is known for their pranks and antics. Cipollini's antics are legendary, including showing up to the stage start at the Tour de France dressed in a Julius Caesar-inspired toga complete with an olive wreath, riding on a carriage pulled by his teammates on bicycles. More recently, the entire Saeco team raced a stage of the 2003 Tour de France wearing a Legalize my Cannondale chaingang cycling kit to protest the UCI's lower bound on bike weight which means that their six13 prototype team bikes were underweight and required the installation of additional weight.

== Major wins ==
1996
Italy Road Race Championships, Mario Cipollini
Coppa Colli Briantei Internazionale, Carlo Marino Bianchi
Volta a Portugal em Bicicleta, Massimiliano Lelli
Overall Tirreno - Adriatico, Francesco Casagrande

Stage 4, Francesco Casagrande

Overall Vuelta Ciclista al Pais Vasco, Francesco Casagrande

Stage 2, Francesco Casagrande
Stage 5b, Francesco Casagrande

Stage 2 Volta a la Comunidad Valenciana, Mario Cipollini
Stage 5a Volta a la Comunidad Valenciana
Stage 3 Tour de Romandie, Mario Cipollini
Stage 5a Tour de Romandie, Mario Cipollini
Stage 6 Tour de Romandie, Mario Cipollini
Points Classification Mario Cipollini

Stage 1, Silvio Martinello
Stage 4, Mario Cipollini
Stage 8, Mario Cipollini
Stage 11, Mario Cipollini
Stage 18, Mario Cipollini

Stage 2 Volta Ciclista a Catalunya, Mario Cipollini
Stage 5 Volta Ciclista a Catalunya, Mario Cipollini
Stage 2 Tour de France, Mario Cipollini

1997
Overall Giro d'Italia, Ivan Gotti

Stage 1, Mario Cipollini
Stage 2, Mario Cipollini
Stage 4, Mario Cipollini
Stage 10, Mario Cipollini
Stage 14, Ivan Gotti
Stage 22, Mario Cipollini

Overall Tirreno - Adriatico, Roberto Petito
Overall Giro di Romagna et Coppa Placci, Francesco Casagrande
Stage 1 Volta a la Comunidad Valenciana, Mario Cipollini
Stage 5a Volta a la Comunidad Valenciana, Gian Matteo Fagnini
Stage 2 Tour de Romandie, Mario Cipollini
Stage 3 Tour de Romandie, Mario Cipollini
Stage 5 Tour de Romandie, Mario Cipollini
Stage 1 Tour de France, Mario Cipollini
Stage 2 Tour de France, Mario Cipollini

1998
Overall Giro del Trentino, Paolo Salvodelli

Stage 2, Paolo Salvodelli

GP Costa degli Etruschi Mario Cipollini
Stage 5 Giro d'Italia Mario Cipollini
Stage 7 Giro d'Italia Mario Cipollini
Stage 8 Giro d'Italia Mario Cipollini
Stage 10 Giro d'Italia Mario Cipollini
Stage 20 Giro d'Italia Gian Matteo Fagnini
Stage 22 Giro d'Italia Gian Matteo Fagnini
Stage 1a Volta Ciclista a Catalunya Mario Cipollini
Stage 2 Volta Ciclista a Catalunya Mario Cipollini
Stage 3 Volta Ciclista a Catalunya Mario Cipollini
Stage 4 Volta Ciclista a Catalunya Mario Cipollini
Stage 5 Tour de France Mario Cipollini
Stage 6 Tour de France Mario Cipollini

1999
Switzerland Road Race Championships, Armin Meier
Italy Road Race Championships, Salvatore Commesso
Peperbus Profspektakel Zwolle, Mario Cipollini
Trofeo Manacor Mario Cipollini
La Poly Normande, Laurent Dufaux
Overall Giro del Trentino, Paolo Salvodelli

Stage 1, Paolo Salvodelli

Trofeo Laigueglia, Paolo Salvodelli
Trofeo Luis Puig, Mario Cipollini
Stage 3 Tirreno–Adriatico, Mario Cipollini
Stage 5 Tour de Romandie, Mario Cipollini
Stage 2 Giro d'Italia, Mario Cipollini
Stage 10 Giro d'Italia, Mario Cipollini
Stage 12 Giro d'Italia, Mario Cipollini
Stage 14 Giro d'Italia, Paolo Salvodelli
Stage 17 Giro d'Italia, Mario Cipollini
Stage 1 Volta a Catalunya, Mario Cipollini
Stage 2 Volta a Catalunya, Mario Cipollini
Stage 4 Tour de France, Mario Cipollini
Stage 5 Tour de France, Mario Cipollini
Stage 6 Tour de France, Mario Cipollini
Stage 7 Tour de France, Mario Cipollini
Stage 13 Tour de France, Salvatore Commesso

2000
Overall Tour de Romandie, Paolo Salvodelli

Prologue

Stage 3 Giro del Trentino, Paolo Salvodelli

Stage 18 Tour de France, Salvatore Commesso

2001
Criterium Bavikhoeve, Mario Cipollini
GP Costa degli Etruschi, Fabio Sacchi
Trofeo Laigueglia, Mirko Celestino
Points Classification, Volta a Portugal, Salvatore Commesso
Rund um die Hainleite, Christian Wegmann
Tour of Austria, Cadel Evans
Brixia Tour, Cadel Evans
Tre Valli Varesine, Mirko Celestino
Milano-Torino, Mirko Celestino
Stage 2 Tour Down Under, Fabio Sacchi
Stage 3 Tour Down Under, Alessio Galletti
Stage 1 Tirreno - Adriatico, Biagio Conte
Prologue Tour de Romandie, Paolo Salvodelli
Stage 2 Tour de Romandie, Paolo Salvodelli
Stage 5 Tour de Romandie, Mario Cipollini
Stage 1 Bayern-Rundfahrt, Jörg Ludewig
Giro d'Italia Azzurri d'Italia classification Mario Cipollini

Stage 6, Mario Cipollini
Stage 9, Mario Cipollini
Stage 19, Mario Cipollini
Stage 21, Mario Cipollini

Stage 2a Rothaus Regio-Tour International, Biagio Conte
Stage 5 Rothaus Regio-Tour International, Biagio Conte

2002
Italy Road Race Championships, Salvatore Commesso
Giro d'Oro, Damiano Cunego
Giro del Medio Brenta, Damiano Cunego
Giro del Veneto, Danilo Di Luca
Trophy City 'Castelfidardo, Danilo Di Luca
GP Ind.Com.Art of Castelfidardo, Fabio Bags
Criterium d'Abruzzo, Salvatore Commesso
Stage 11, Giro d'Italia, Gilberto Simoni
Trophy Laigueglia, Danilo Di Luca
Overall Tour of Austria, Gerrit Glomser

Stage 4, Gerrit Glomser

Trofeo Matteotti, Salvatore Commesso
Overall Brixia Tour, Igor Astarloa

Stage 2a, Igor Astarloa
Stage 2b, Mirko Celestine

Stage 4 Volta a la Comunidad Valenciana, Danilo Di Luca
Stage 3 Tirreno - Adriatico, Danilo Di Luca
Stage 5 Tirreno - Adriatico, Danilo Di Luca
Stage 4 Bayern-Rundfahrt, Christian Wegmann
Stage 2 Vuelta a España, Danilo Di Luca

2003
World Road Championship, Igor Astarloa
Overall Giro d'Italia, Gilberto Simoni

Points Classification, Gilberto Simoni
Azzurri d'Italia classification, Gilberto Simoni
Stage 12, Gilberto Simoni
Stage 14, Gilberto Simoni
Stage19, Gilberto Simoni

Overall Giro del Trentino, Gilberto Simoni

Stage 2, Gilberto Simoni
Giro dell'Appennino, Gilberto Simoni

Overall, Tour of Qinghai Lake, Damiano Cunego

Stage 7

US Pro Championship, Stefano Zanini
Milano-Torino, Mirko Celestino
Coppa Placci, Danilo Di Luca
Trofeo Città´ di Castelfidardom, Alessio Galletti
Settimana Ciclistica Internazionale, Mirko Celestino
La Flèche Wallonne, Igor Astarloa
GP Industria & Artigianato- Larciano, Juan Manuel Fuentes
Overall Tour of Austria, Gerrit Glomser

Stage 2, Gerrit Glomser
Stage 3, Gerrit Glomser

GP Llodio, Juan Manuel Fuentes
Tre Valli Varesine, Danilo Di Luca
Giro di Romagna et Coppa Placci, Fabio Sacchi
Stage 2 Tour Down Under, Fabio Sacchi
Stage 4 Tour of Qatar, Ivan Quaranta
Stage 3 Volta a la Comunidad Valenciana, Igor Astarloa
Stage 6 Tirreno - Adriatico, Danilo Di Luca
Stage 4 Deutschland Tour, Ivan Quaranta
Stage 14 Tour de France, Gilberto Simoni
Stage 1 Brixia Tour, Ivan Quaranta
Stage 1 Rothaus Regio-Tour International, Nicola Gavazzi

2004
Overall Giro d'Italia, Damiano Cunego

Stage 2, Damiano Cunego
Stage 3, Gilberto Simoni
Stage 7, Damiano Cunego
Stage 16, Damiano Cunego
Stage 18, Damiano Cunego

Giro di Lombardia
Overall, Giro del Trentino, Damiano Cunego

Stage 1, Damiano Cunego
Stage 2, Damiano Cunego

Giro dell'Appennino, Damiano Cunego
Giro del Trentino, Damiano Cunego
GP Industria & Artigianato, Damiano Cunego
Gran Premio Nobili Rubinetterie, Damiano Cunego
Memorial Marco Pantani, Damiano Cunego
Giro del Veneto, Gilberto Simoni
Raiffeisen GP, Andreas Matzbacher
Cup Placci, Leonardo Bertagnolli
Trophy Etna, Leonardo Bertagnolli
GP Ind.Com.Art of Castelfidardo, Damiano Cunego
GP Industria & Crafts-Larciano, Damiano Cunego
Trofeo Matteotti, Danilo Di Luca
Overall Brixia Tour, Danilo Di Luca
Coppa Agostoni, Leonardo Bertagnolli
GP Nobili Rubinetterie, Damiano Cunego
Overall Tour of Lombardy, Damiano Cunego
Stage 1 Bayern-Rundfahrt, Antonio Bucciero
Stage 4 Tour of Austria, Gerrit Glomser

== National and world champions ==
1996
Road Race Mario Cipollini

1999
Road Race Salvatore Commesso
Road Race Armin Meier

2002
Road Race Salvatore Commesso

2003
World Road Race Igor Astarloa
