= Daniel Atienza =

Spanish cyclist

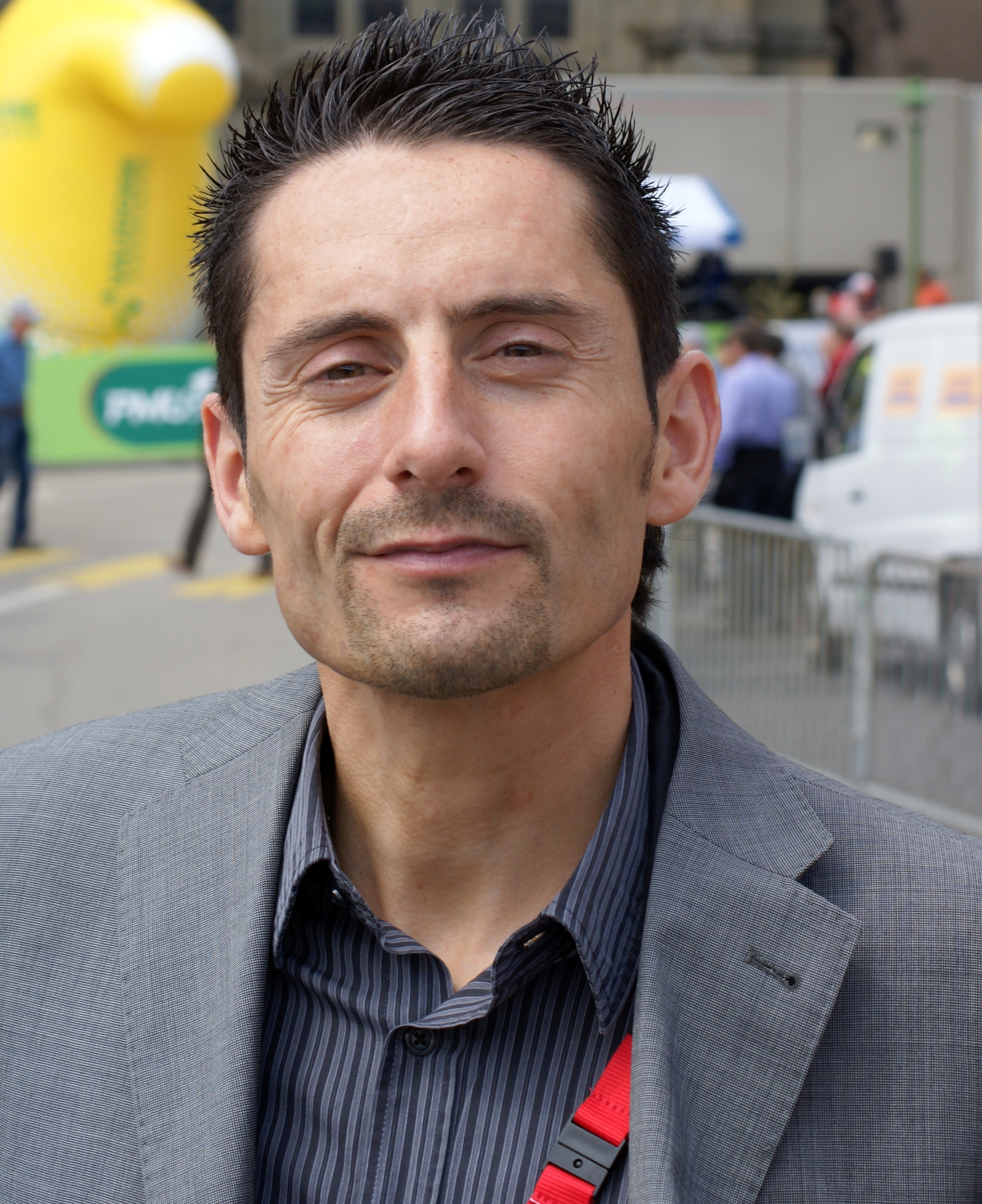

Personal information
- Full name: Daniel Atienza Urendez
- Born: 22 September 1974 (age 52) Moudon, Switzerland

Cycling career
- Sport: Cycling
- Discipline: Road
- Role: Rider

Professional teams
- 1997–1999: Team Polti
- 2000: Saeco–Valli & Valli
- 2001–2005: Cofidis

Daniel Atienza Urendez (born 22 September 1974 in Moudon, Switzerland) is a former Spanish professional road bicycle racer who rode for UCI ProTeam Cofidis from 2001 to 2005. He is also a highly accomplished amateur distance runner, running the Zurich Marathon in 2:29:27 in 2013.

== Major results ==
1996
1st Stage 7, Circuito Montañés
1999
12th Overall, Tour de Romandie
2000
1st Rominger Classic
10th Overall, Tour de Suisse
29th Overall, Tour de France
2001
13th Overall, Tour de Suisse
30th Overall, Tour de France
2002
1st Mountains Competition, Midi Libre
15th Overall, Volta a Catalunya
2003
9th Overall, Volta a Catalunya
2004
10th Overall, Volta a Catalunya
2005
9th Overall, Tour de Romandie
13th Overall, Tour de Suisse
14th Overall, Giro d'Italia
17th Overall, Vuelta a España
