= Relax–GAM =

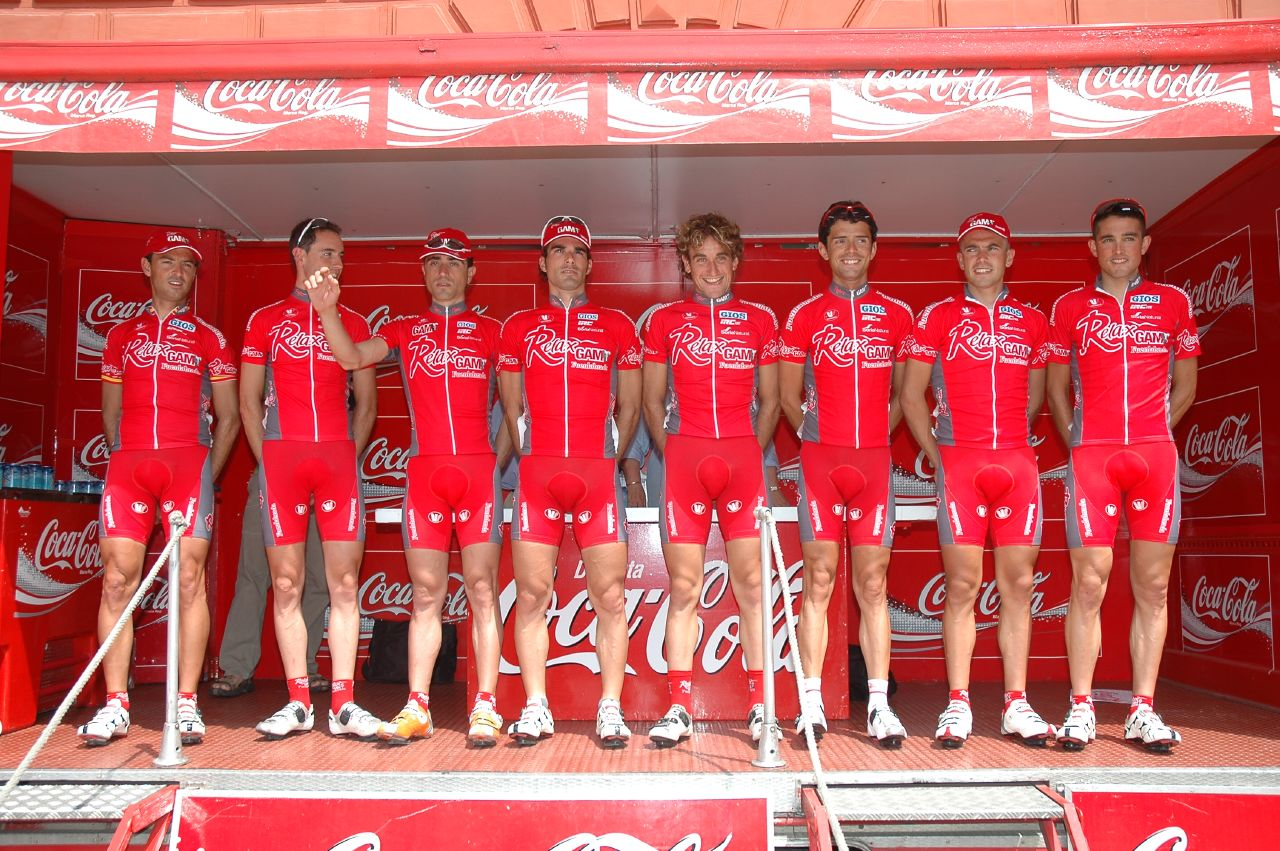
- The team in 2007.

Team information
- UCI code: REG
- Registered: Spain
- Founded: 1984
- Disbanded: 2007
- Discipline: Road
- Status: UCI Professional Continental
- Bicycles: Gios

Relax–GAM Fuenlabrada (UCI Code: REG) was a professional cycling team based in Spain. It participated in UCI Europe Tour and when selected as a wildcard to UCI ProTour events.

In 2006, Relax-Gam received a wild card invitation from the organisers to participate in the Vuelta a España. For the 2007 season, Relax have signed Francisco Mancebo and Santiago Pérez to lead the team.

== 2007 team ==
=== Major wins ===
- 1st, Team classification, Volta a Catalunya (UCI ProTour)
- 2nd Overall, Vuelta al País Vasco (UCI ProTour), Ángel Vicioso
  - 1st, Stage 3, Vuelta al País Vasco, Ángel Vicioso
- 1st, Mountains classification, Vuelta Asturias, Julian Sanchez Pimienta

=== Team roster ===
As of May 28, 2007.

| Rider | Date of birth |
|---|---|
| Nácor Burgos (ESP) | 9 April 1977 (aged 29) |
| Mario de Sárraga (ESP) | 22 August 1980 (aged 26) |
| José Miguel Elías (ESP) | 15 January 1977 (aged 29) |
| Raúl García de Mateos (ESP) | 5 July 1982 (aged 24) |
| Jorge García (ESP) | 23 April 1980 (aged 26) |
| Óscar García-Casarrubios (ESP) | 7 June 1984 (aged 22) |
| Jesús Hernández (ESP) | 28 September 1981 (aged 25) |
| Jan Hruška (CZE) | 4 February 1975 (aged 31) |
| Denis Kudashev (RUS) | 4 June 1981 (aged 25) |
| Francisco Mancebo (ESP) | 9 March 1976 (aged 30) |

| Rider | Date of birth |
|---|---|
| Jose Rafael Martinez (ESP) | 19 April 1976 (aged 30) |
| Daniel Moreno (ESP) | 5 September 1981 (aged 25) |
| Jorge Pérez (ESP) | 17 June 1983 (aged 23) |
| Santiago Pérez (ESP) | 5 August 1977 (aged 29) |
| Julian Sanchez (ESP) | 26 February 1980 (aged 26) |
| Óscar Sevilla (ESP) | 29 September 1976 (aged 30) |
| Joaquin Sobrino (ESP) | 22 June 1982 (aged 24) |
| Francisco José Terciado (ESP) | 25 March 1981 (aged 25) |
| Ángel Vallejo (ESP) | 1 April 1981 (aged 25) |
| Ángel Vicioso (ESP) | 13 April 1977 (aged 29) |
