= Costa de Almería (cycling team) =

Spanish professional cycling team

Team information
- UCI code: JAZ
- Registered: Spain
- Founded: 2000
- Disbanded: 2004
- Discipline: Road

Team name history
- 2000 2000–2002 2003 2004: Costa de Almería; Jazztel–Costa de Almería; Paternina–Costa de Almería; Costa de Almería–Paternina

Costa de Almería was a Spanish professional cycling team that existed from 2000 to 2004. The team was founded on the split of the Italian team Amica Chips-Costa de Almería. The team was sponsored by Jazztel and Paternina, and the tourist office of the Costa de Almería.
