= 2002 Vuelta a España, Stage 1 to Stage 11 =

Cycling race stages

The 2002 Vuelta a España was the 57th edition of the Vuelta a España, one of cycling's Grand Tours. The Vuelta began in Valencia, with a team time trial on 7 September, and Stage 11 occurred on 18 September with a stage to Collado Villalba. The race finished in Madrid on 29 September.

== Stage 1 ==
7 September 2002 — Valencia, 24.6 km (15.3 mi) (TTT)

Stage 1 Result

| Rank | Team | Time |
|---|---|---|
| 1 | ONCE–Eroski | 26' 21" |
| 2 | U.S. Postal Service | + 14" |
| 3 | Kelme–Costa Blanca | + 15" |
| 4 | Team Telekom | + 18" |
| 5 | Fassa Bortolo | + 23" |
| 6 | Cofidis | + 26" |
| 7 | iBanesto.com | + 27" |
| 8 | Team Coast | + 39" |
| 9 | Mapei–Quick-Step | + 42" |
| 10 | Acqua & Sapone–Cantina Tollo | + 43" |

General classification after Stage 1

| Rank | Rider | Team | Time |
|---|---|---|---|
| 1 | Joseba Beloki (ESP) | ONCE–Eroski | 26' 21" |
| 2 | Igor González de Galdeano (ESP) | ONCE–Eroski | s.t. |
| 3 | José Azevedo (POR) | ONCE–Eroski | s.t. |
| 4 | Rafael Díaz Justo (ESP) | ONCE–Eroski | s.t. |
| 5 | Jörg Jaksche (GER) | ONCE–Eroski | s.t. |
| 6 | Marcos Serrano (ESP) | ONCE–Eroski | s.t. |
| 7 | Mikel Zarrabeitia (ESP) | ONCE–Eroski | s.t. |
| 8 | Antonio Cruz (USA) | U.S. Postal Service | + 14" |
| 9 | Michael Barry (CAN) | U.S. Postal Service | s.t. |
| 10 | Víctor Hugo Peña (COL) | U.S. Postal Service | s.t. |

== Stage 2 ==
8 September 2002 — Valencia to Alcoy, 144.7 km (89.9 mi)

Stage 2 Results

| Rank | Rider | Team | Time |
|---|---|---|---|
| 1 | Danilo Di Luca (ITA) | Saeco–Longoni Sport | 3h 59' 35" |
| 2 | Erik Zabel (GER) | Team Telekom | s.t. |
| 3 | Oscar Camenzind (SUI) | Phonak | s.t. |
| 4 | Ángel Edo (ESP) | Milaneza–MSS | s.t. |
| 5 | Paolo Bossoni (ITA) | Tacconi Sport | s.t. |
| 6 | Nicola Loda (ITA) | Fassa Bortolo | s.t. |
| 7 | Joseba Beloki (ESP) | ONCE–Eroski | s.t. |
| 8 | Aitor González (ESP) | Kelme–Costa Blanca | s.t. |
| 9 | Juan Carlos Guillamón (ESP) | Jazztel–Costa de Almería | s.t. |
| 10 | Massimiliano Lelli (ITA) | Cofidis | s.t. |

General classification after Stage 2

| Rank | Rider | Team | Time |
|---|---|---|---|
| 1 | Joseba Beloki (ESP) | ONCE–Eroski | 4h 25' 56" |
| 2 | Igor González de Galdeano (ESP) | ONCE–Eroski | s.t. |
| 3 | José Azevedo (POR) | ONCE–Eroski | s.t. |
| 4 | Mikel Zarrabeitia (ESP) | ONCE–Eroski | s.t. |
| 5 | Marcos Serrano (ESP) | ONCE–Eroski | s.t. |
| 6 | Jörg Jaksche (GER) | ONCE–Eroski | s.t. |
| 7 | Roberto Heras (ESP) | U.S. Postal Service | + 14" |
| 8 | Christian Vande Velde (USA) | U.S. Postal Service | s.t. |
| 9 | José Luis Rubiera (ESP) | U.S. Postal Service | s.t. |
| 10 | Aitor González (ESP) | Kelme–Costa Blanca | + 15" |

== Stage 3 ==
9 September 2002 — San Vicente del Raspeig to Murcia, 134.2 km (83.4 mi)

Stage 3 Results

| Rank | Rider | Team | Time |
|---|---|---|---|
| 1 | Mario Cipollini (ITA) | Acqua & Sapone–Cantina Tollo | 3h 07' 37" |
| 2 | Alessandro Petacchi (ITA) | Fassa Bortolo | s.t. |
| 3 | Erik Zabel (GER) | Team Telekom | s.t. |
| 4 | Óscar Freire (ESP) | Mapei–Quick-Step | s.t. |
| 5 | Sven Teutenberg (GER) | Phonak | s.t. |
| 6 | Zoran Klemenčič (SLO) | Tacconi Sport | s.t. |
| 7 | Ángel Edo (ESP) | Milaneza–MSS | s.t. |
| 8 | Martín Garrido (ARG) | Colchon Relax–Fuenlabrada | s.t. |
| 9 | Juan Carlos Guillamón (ESP) | Jazztel–Costa de Almería | s.t. |
| 10 | Ján Svorada (CZE) | Lampre–Daikin | s.t. |

General classification after Stage 3

| Rank | Rider | Team | Time |
|---|---|---|---|
| 1 | Joseba Beloki (ESP) | ONCE–Eroski | 7h 33' 39" |
| 2 | Mikel Zarrabeitia (ESP) | ONCE–Eroski | s.t. |
| 3 | Igor González de Galdeano (ESP) | ONCE–Eroski | s.t. |
| 4 | José Azevedo (POR) | ONCE–Eroski | s.t. |
| 5 | Marcos Serrano (ESP) | ONCE–Eroski | s.t. |
| 6 | Jörg Jaksche (GER) | ONCE–Eroski | s.t. |
| 7 | José Enrique Gutiérrez (ESP) | Kelme–Costa Blanca | + 9" |
| 8 | Erik Zabel (GER) | Team Telekom | + 12" |
| 9 | Roberto Heras (ESP) | U.S. Postal Service | + 14" |
| 10 | Christian Vande Velde (USA) | U.S. Postal Service | s.t. |

== Stage 4 ==
10 September 2002 — Águilas to Roquetas de Mar, 149.5 km (92.9 mi)

Stage 4 Results

| Rank | Rider | Team | Time |
|---|---|---|---|
| 1 | Mario Cipollini (ITA) | Acqua & Sapone–Cantina Tollo | 3h 33' 32" |
| 2 | Alessandro Petacchi (ITA) | Fassa Bortolo | s.t. |
| 3 | Gerrit Glomser (AUT) | Saeco–Longoni Sport | s.t. |
| 4 | Erik Zabel (GER) | Team Telekom | s.t. |
| 5 | Ján Svorada (CZE) | Lampre–Daikin | s.t. |
| 6 | Angelo Furlan (ITA) | Alessio | s.t. |
| 7 | Ángel Edo (ESP) | Milaneza–MSS | s.t. |
| 8 | Óscar Freire (ESP) | Mapei–Quick-Step | s.t. |
| 9 | Lauri Aus (EST) | AG2R Prévoyance | s.t. |
| 10 | Jeroen Blijlevens (NED) | Domo–Farm Frites | s.t. |

General classification after Stage 4

| Rank | Rider | Team | Time |
|---|---|---|---|
| 1 | Joseba Beloki (ESP) | ONCE–Eroski | 11h 07' 11" |
| 2 | Mikel Zarrabeitia (ESP) | ONCE–Eroski | s.t. |
| 3 | Igor González de Galdeano (ESP) | ONCE–Eroski | s.t. |
| 4 | José Azevedo (POR) | ONCE–Eroski | s.t. |
| 5 | Marcos Serrano (ESP) | ONCE–Eroski | s.t. |
| 6 | Jörg Jaksche (GER) | ONCE–Eroski | s.t. |
| 7 | José Enrique Gutiérrez (ESP) | Kelme–Costa Blanca | + 9" |
| 8 | Erik Zabel (GER) | Team Telekom | + 12" |
| 9 | Roberto Heras (ESP) | U.S. Postal Service | + 14" |
| 10 | Christian Vande Velde (USA) | U.S. Postal Service | s.t. |

== Stage 5 ==
11 September 2002 — El Ejido to Sierra Nevada, 198 km (123 mi)

Stage 5 Results

| Rank | Rider | Team | Time |
|---|---|---|---|
| 1 | Guido Trentin (ITA) | Cofidis | 5h 45' 59" |
| 2 | Félix García Casas (ESP) | BigMat–Auber 93 | + 8" |
| 3 | Haimar Zubeldia (ESP) | Euskaltel–Euskadi | + 10" |
| 4 | Mikel Zarrabeitia (ESP) | ONCE–Eroski | + 10" |
| 5 | Alexander Vinokourov (KAZ) | Team Telekom | + 28" |
| 6 | Jörg Jaksche (GER) | ONCE–Eroski | + 45" |
| 7 | Óscar Sevilla (ESP) | Kelme–Costa Blanca | + 47" |
| 8 | Pablo Lastras (ESP) | iBanesto.com | + 47" |
| 9 | Danilo Di Luca (ITA) | Saeco–Longoni Sport | + 51" |
| 10 | Rui Sousa (POR) | Milaneza–MSS | + 53" |

General classification after Stage 5

| Rank | Rider | Team | Time |
|---|---|---|---|
| 1 | Mikel Zarrabeitia (ESP) | ONCE–Eroski | 16h 53' 20" |
| 2 | Guido Trentin (ITA) | Cofidis | + 16" |
| 3 | Jörg Jaksche (GER) | ONCE–Eroski | + 35" |
| 4 | Alexander Vinokourov (KAZ) | Team Telekom | + 36" |
| 5 | Óscar Sevilla (ESP) | Kelme–Costa Blanca | + 52" |
| 6 | Haimar Zubeldia (ESP) | Euskaltel–Euskadi | + 1' 03" |
| 7 | Aitor González (ESP) | Kelme–Costa Blanca | + 1' 03" |
| 8 | Pablo Lastras (ESP) | iBanesto.com | + 1' 04" |
| 9 | Félix García Casas (ESP) | BigMat–Auber 93 | + 1' 14" |
| 10 | Joseba Beloki (ESP) | ONCE–Eroski | + 1' 28" |

== Stage 6 ==
12 September 2002 — Granada to Sierra de la Pandera, 153.1 km (95.1 mi)

Stage 6 Results

| Rank | Rider | Team | Time |
|---|---|---|---|
| 1 | Roberto Heras (ESP) | U.S. Postal Service | 3h 56' 47" |
| 2 | Gilberto Simoni (ITA) | Saeco–Longoni Sport | + 18" |
| 3 | Óscar Sevilla (ESP) | Kelme–Costa Blanca | + 18" |
| 4 | Iban Mayo (ESP) | Euskaltel–Euskadi | + 18" |
| 5 | Alexander Vinokourov (KAZ) | Team Telekom | + 48" |
| 6 | Aitor González (ESP) | Kelme–Costa Blanca | + 48" |
| 7 | Félix García Casas (ESP) | BigMat–Auber 93 | + 48" |
| 8 | Fabian Jeker (SUI) | Milaneza–MSS | + 48" |
| 9 | Oscar Camenzind (SUI) | Phonak | + 1' 04" |
| 10 | Francesco Casagrande (ITA) | Fassa Bortolo | + 1' 04" |

General classification after Stage 6

| Rank | Rider | Team | Time |
|---|---|---|---|
| 1 | Óscar Sevilla (ESP) | Kelme–Costa Blanca | 20h 51' 47" |
| 2 | Alexander Vinokourov (KAZ) | Team Telekom | + 14" |
| 3 | Roberto Heras (ESP) | U.S. Postal Service | + 39" |
| 4 | Aitor González (ESP) | Kelme–Costa Blanca | + 41" |
| 5 | Félix García Casas (ESP) | BigMat–Auber 93 | + 52" |
| 6 | Haimar Zubeldia (ESP) | Euskaltel–Euskadi | + 57" |
| 7 | Iban Mayo (ESP) | Euskaltel–Euskadi | + 1' 14" |
| 8 | Mikel Zarrabeitia (ESP) | ONCE–Eroski | + 1' 25" |
| 9 | Jörg Jaksche (GER) | ONCE–Eroski | + 1' 32" |
| 10 | Joseba Beloki (ESP) | ONCE–Eroski | + 1' 43" |

== Stage 7 ==
13 September 2002 — Jaén to Málaga, 196.8 km (122.3 mi)

Stage 7 Results

| Rank | Rider | Team | Time |
|---|---|---|---|
| 1 | Mario Cipollini (ITA) | Acqua & Sapone–Cantina Tollo | 4h 33' 47" |
| 2 | Erik Zabel (GER) | Team Telekom | s.t. |
| 3 | Sven Teutenberg (GER) | Phonak | s.t. |
| 4 | Alessandro Petacchi (ITA) | Fassa Bortolo | s.t. |
| 5 | Jeroen Blijlevens (NED) | Domo–Farm Frites | s.t. |
| 6 | Angelo Furlan (ITA) | Alessio | s.t. |
| 7 | Gerrit Glomser (AUT) | Saeco–Longoni Sport | s.t. |
| 8 | Fabio Sacchi (ITA) | Saeco–Longoni Sport | s.t. |
| 9 | Óscar Freire (ESP) | Mapei–Quick-Step | s.t. |
| 10 | Ángel Edo (ESP) | Milaneza–MSS | s.t. |

General classification after Stage 7

| Rank | Rider | Team | Time |
|---|---|---|---|
| 1 | Óscar Sevilla (ESP) | Kelme–Costa Blanca | 25h 25' 04" |
| 2 | Alexander Vinokourov (KAZ) | Team Telekom | + 14" |
| 3 | Roberto Heras (ESP) | U.S. Postal Service | + 39" |
| 4 | Aitor González (ESP) | Kelme–Costa Blanca | + 41" |
| 5 | Félix García Casas (ESP) | BigMat–Auber 93 | + 52" |
| 6 | Haimar Zubeldia (ESP) | Euskaltel–Euskadi | + 57" |
| 7 | Iban Mayo (ESP) | Euskaltel–Euskadi | + 1' 14" |
| 8 | Mikel Zarrabeitia (ESP) | ONCE–Eroski | + 1' 25" |
| 9 | Jörg Jaksche (GER) | ONCE–Eroski | + 1' 32" |
| 10 | Joseba Beloki (ESP) | ONCE–Eroski | + 1' 43" |

== Stage 8 ==
14 September 2002 — Málaga to Ubrique, 173.6 km (107.9 mi)

Stage 8 Results

| Rank | Rider | Team | Time |
|---|---|---|---|
| 1 | Aitor González (ESP) | Kelme–Costa Blanca | 4h 18' 36" |
| 2 | David Etxebarria (ESP) | Euskaltel–Euskadi | s.t. |
| 3 | Luis Pérez (ESP) | Team Coast | s.t. |
| 4 | Danilo Di Luca (ITA) | Saeco–Longoni Sport | s.t. |
| 5 | Francesco Casagrande (ITA) | Fassa Bortolo | s.t. |
| 6 | Pablo Lastras (ESP) | iBanesto.com | s.t. |
| 7 | Francisco Mancebo (ESP) | iBanesto.com | s.t. |
| 8 | David Millar (GBR) | Cofidis | s.t. |
| 9 | Iban Mayo (ESP) | Euskaltel–Euskadi | s.t. |
| 10 | Alexander Vinokourov (KAZ) | Team Telekom | s.t. |

General classification after Stage 8

| Rank | Rider | Team | Time |
|---|---|---|---|
| 1 | Óscar Sevilla (ESP) | Kelme–Costa Blanca | 29h 43' 40" |
| 2 | Alexander Vinokourov (KAZ) | Team Telekom | + 14" |
| 3 | Aitor González (ESP) | Kelme–Costa Blanca | + 41" |
| 4 | Roberto Heras (ESP) | U.S. Postal Service | + 48" |
| 5 | Félix García Casas (ESP) | BigMat–Auber 93 | + 1' 01" |
| 6 | Haimar Zubeldia (ESP) | Euskaltel–Euskadi | + 1' 09" |
| 7 | Iban Mayo (ESP) | Euskaltel–Euskadi | + 1' 14" |
| 8 | Mikel Zarrabeitia (ESP) | ONCE–Eroski | + 1' 34" |
| 9 | Joseba Beloki (ESP) | ONCE–Eroski | + 1' 43" |
| 10 | Jörg Jaksche (GER) | ONCE–Eroski | + 1' 44" |

== Stage 9 ==
15 September 2002 — Córdoba to Córdoba, 130.2 km (80.9 mi)

Stage 9 Results

| Rank | Rider | Team | Time |
|---|---|---|---|
| 1 | Pablo Lastras (ESP) | iBanesto.com | 2h 48' 52" |
| 2 | Luis Pérez (ESP) | Team Coast | + 13" |
| 3 | Fabian Jeker (SUI) | Milaneza–MSS | + 13" |
| 4 | Alejandro Valverde (ESP) | Kelme–Costa Blanca | + 21" |
| 5 | Erik Zabel (GER) | Team Telekom | + 21" |
| 6 | Gerrit Glomser (AUT) | Saeco–Longoni Sport | + 21" |
| 7 | Ángel Edo (ESP) | Milaneza–MSS | + 21" |
| 8 | Oscar Camenzind (SUI) | Phonak | + 21" |
| 9 | Aitor González (ESP) | Kelme–Costa Blanca | + 21" |
| 10 | Dave Bruylandts (BEL) | Domo–Farm Frites | + 21" |

General classification after Stage 9

| Rank | Rider | Team | Time |
|---|---|---|---|
| 1 | Óscar Sevilla (ESP) | Kelme–Costa Blanca | 32h 32' 53" |
| 2 | Alexander Vinokourov (KAZ) | Team Telekom | + 14" |
| 3 | Aitor González (ESP) | Kelme–Costa Blanca | + 41" |
| 4 | Roberto Heras (ESP) | U.S. Postal Service | + 48" |
| 5 | Félix García Casas (ESP) | BigMat–Auber 93 | + 1' 01" |
| 6 | Haimar Zubeldia (ESP) | Euskaltel–Euskadi | + 1' 09" |
| 7 | Iban Mayo (ESP) | Euskaltel–Euskadi | + 1' 14" |
| 8 | Mikel Zarrabeitia (ESP) | ONCE–Eroski | + 1' 34" |
| 9 | Joseba Beloki (ESP) | ONCE–Eroski | + 1' 43" |
| 10 | Jörg Jaksche (GER) | ONCE–Eroski | + 1' 44" |

== Stage 10 ==
16 September 2002 — Córdoba to Córdoba, 36.5 km (22.7 mi), (ITT)

Stage 10 Results

| Rank | Rider | Team | Time |
|---|---|---|---|
| 1 | Aitor González (ESP) | Kelme–Costa Blanca | 45' 32" |
| 2 | Óscar Sevilla (ESP) | Kelme–Costa Blanca | + 40" |
| 3 | David Millar (GBR) | Cofidis | + 1' 00" |
| 4 | Joseba Beloki (ESP) | ONCE–Eroski | + 1' 01" |
| 5 | Toni Tauler (ESP) | Kelme–Costa Blanca | + 1' 24" |
| 6 | Iban Mayo (ESP) | Euskaltel–Euskadi | + 1' 30" |
| 7 | Roberto Heras (ESP) | U.S. Postal Service | + 1' 34" |
| 8 | Claus Michael Møller (DEN) | Milaneza–MSS | + 1' 42" |
| 9 | Christian Vande Velde (USA) | U.S. Postal Service | + 1' 43" |
| 10 | Óscar Pereiro (ESP) | Phonak | + 1' 50" |

General classification after Stage 10

| Rank | Rider | Team | Time |
|---|---|---|---|
| 1 | Óscar Sevilla (ESP) | Kelme–Costa Blanca | 33h 19' 05" |
| 2 | Aitor González (ESP) | Kelme–Costa Blanca | + 1" |
| 3 | Roberto Heras (ESP) | U.S. Postal Service | + 1' 42" |
| 4 | Iban Mayo (ESP) | Euskaltel–Euskadi | + 2' 04" |
| 5 | Joseba Beloki (ESP) | ONCE–Eroski | + 2' 04" |
| 6 | Alexander Vinokourov (KAZ) | Team Telekom | + 2' 19" |
| 7 | Haimar Zubeldia (ESP) | Euskaltel–Euskadi | + 2' 56" |
| 8 | Félix García Casas (ESP) | BigMat–Auber 93 | + 3' 05" |
| 9 | Jörg Jaksche (GER) | ONCE–Eroski | + 3' 20" |
| 10 | Mikel Zarrabeitia (ESP) | ONCE–Eroski | + 3' 33" |

== Stage 11 ==
18 September 2002 — Alcobendas to Collado Villalba, 166.1 km (103.2 mi)

Stage 11 Results

| Rank | Rider | Team | Time |
|---|---|---|---|
| 1 | Pablo Lastras (ESP) | iBanesto.com | 3h 55' 54" |
| 2 | Haimar Zubeldia (ESP) | Euskaltel–Euskadi | s.t. |
| 3 | Claus Michael Møller (DEN) | Milaneza–MSS | + 2" |
| 4 | David Millar (GBR) | Cofidis | + 9" |
| 5 | Francesco Casagrande (ITA) | Fassa Bortolo | + 9" |
| 6 | Danilo Di Luca (ITA) | Saeco–Longoni Sport | + 9" |
| 7 | Óscar Sevilla (ESP) | Kelme–Costa Blanca | + 9" |
| 8 | Gilberto Simoni (ITA) | Saeco–Longoni Sport | + 9" |
| 9 | Fabian Jeker (SUI) | Milaneza–MSS | + 9" |
| 10 | Roberto Heras (ESP) | U.S. Postal Service | + 9" |

General classification after Stage 11

| Rank | Rider | Team | Time |
|---|---|---|---|
| 1 | Óscar Sevilla (ESP) | Kelme–Costa Blanca | 37h 15' 08" |
| 2 | Aitor González (ESP) | Kelme–Costa Blanca | + 1" |
| 3 | Roberto Heras (ESP) | U.S. Postal Service | + 1' 42" |
| 4 | Iban Mayo (ESP) | Euskaltel–Euskadi | + 2' 04" |
| 5 | Joseba Beloki (ESP) | ONCE–Eroski | + 2' 04" |
| 6 | Haimar Zubeldia (ESP) | Euskaltel–Euskadi | + 2' 47" |
| 7 | Félix García Casas (ESP) | BigMat–Auber 93 | + 3' 05" |
| 8 | Jörg Jaksche (GER) | ONCE–Eroski | + 3' 20" |
| 9 | Guido Trentin (ITA) | Cofidis | + 3' 34" |
| 10 | David Millar (GBR) | Cofidis | + 3' 36" |
