= 2002 Vuelta a España, Stage 12 to Stage 21 =

Cycling race stages

The 2002 Vuelta a España was the 57th edition of the Vuelta a España, one of cycling's Grand Tours. The Vuelta began in Valencia, with a team time trial on 7 September, and Stage 12 occurred on 19 September with a stage from Segovia. The race finished in Madrid on 29 September.

== Stage 12 ==
19 September 2002 — Segovia to Burgos, 210.5 km (130.8 mi)

Stage 12 Results

Rank	Rider	Team	Time
1	Alessandro Petacchi (ITA)	Fassa Bortolo	4h 16' 32"
2	Erik Zabel (GER)	Team Telekom	s.t.
3	Angelo Furlan (ITA)	Alessio	s.t.
4	Gerrit Glomser (AUT)	Saeco–Longoni Sport	s.t.
5	Daniele Bennati (ITA)	Acqua & Sapone–Cantina Tollo	s.t.
6	Danilo Di Luca (ITA)	Saeco–Longoni Sport	s.t.
7	Andrej Hauptman (SLO)	Tacconi Sport	s.t.
8	Fabrizio Guidi (ITA)	Team Coast	s.t.
9	Fabio Sacchi (ITA)	Saeco–Longoni Sport	s.t.
10	Sven Teutenberg (GER)	Phonak	s.t.

General classification after Stage 12

Rank	Rider	Team	Time
1	Óscar Sevilla (ESP)	Kelme–Costa Blanca	41h 31' 40"
2	Aitor González (ESP)	Kelme–Costa Blanca	+ 1"
3	Roberto Heras (ESP)	U.S. Postal Service	+ 1' 42"
4	Iban Mayo (ESP)	Euskaltel–Euskadi	+ 2' 04"
5	Joseba Beloki (ESP)	ONCE–Eroski	+ 2' 04"
6	Haimar Zubeldia (ESP)	Euskaltel–Euskadi	+ 2' 47"
7	Félix García Casas (ESP)	BigMat–Auber 93	+ 3' 05"
8	Guido Trentin (ITA)	Cofidis	+ 3' 34"
9	David Millar (GBR)	Cofidis	+ 3' 36"
10	Jörg Jaksche (GER)	ONCE–Eroski	+ 3' 51"

== Stage 13 ==
20 September 2002 — Burgos to Santander, 189.8 km (117.9 mi)

Stage 13 Results

Rank	Rider	Team	Time
1	Giovanni Lombardi (ITA)	Acqua & Sapone–Cantina Tollo	4h 11' 21"
2	Davide Bramati (ITA)	Mapei–Quick-Step	s.t.
3	Paolo Bossoni (ITA)	Tacconi Sport	s.t.
4	Marco Velo (ITA)	Fassa Bortolo	s.t.
5	Pietro Caucchioli (ITA)	Alessio	s.t.
6	Óscar Laguna (ESP)	Colchon Relax–Fuenlabrada	s.t.
7	Óscar Pereiro (ESP)	Phonak	+ 18"
8	Andrej Hauptman (SLO)	Tacconi Sport	+ 22"
9	Dmitriy Fofonov (KAZ)	Cofidis	+ 22"
10	Alessandro Guerra (ITA)	Index–Alexia Alluminio	+ 22"

General classification after Stage 13

Rank	Rider	Team	Time
1	Óscar Sevilla (ESP)	Kelme–Costa Blanca	45h 51' 22"
2	Aitor González (ESP)	Kelme–Costa Blanca	+ 1"
3	Roberto Heras (ESP)	U.S. Postal Service	+ 1' 42"
4	Iban Mayo (ESP)	Euskaltel–Euskadi	+ 2' 04"
5	Joseba Beloki (ESP)	ONCE–Eroski	+ 2' 04"
6	Haimar Zubeldia (ESP)	Euskaltel–Euskadi	+ 2' 47"
7	Félix García Casas (ESP)	BigMat–Auber 93	+ 3' 05"
8	Guido Trentin (ITA)	Cofidis	+ 3' 34"
9	David Millar (GBR)	Cofidis	+ 3' 36"
10	Jörg Jaksche (GER)	ONCE–Eroski	+ 3' 51"

== Stage 14 ==
21 September 2002 — Santander to Gijón, 190.2 km (118.2 mi)

Stage 14 Results

Rank	Rider	Team	Time
1	Serguei Smetanine (RUS)	Jazztel–Costa de Almería	4h 17' 23"
2	Óscar Laguna (ESP)	Colchon Relax–Fuenlabrada	+ 1' 57"
3	Angelo Furlan (ITA)	Alessio	+ 2' 39"
4	Erik Zabel (GER)	Team Telekom	+ 2' 39"
5	Alessandro Petacchi (ITA)	Fassa Bortolo	+ 2' 39"
6	Daniele Bennati (ITA)	Acqua & Sapone–Cantina Tollo	+ 2' 39"
7	Fabrizio Guidi (ITA)	Team Coast	+ 2' 39"
8	Gerrit Glomser (AUT)	Saeco–Longoni Sport	+ 2' 39"
9	Davide Bramati (ITA)	Mapei–Quick-Step	+ 2' 39"
10	Andrej Hauptman (SLO)	Tacconi Sport	+ 2' 39"

General classification after Stage 14

Rank	Rider	Team	Time
1	Óscar Sevilla (ESP)	Kelme–Costa Blanca	50h 11' 24"
2	Aitor González (ESP)	Kelme–Costa Blanca	+ 1"
3	Roberto Heras (ESP)	U.S. Postal Service	+ 1' 42"
4	Iban Mayo (ESP)	Euskaltel–Euskadi	+ 2' 04"
5	Joseba Beloki (ESP)	ONCE–Eroski	+ 2' 04"
6	Haimar Zubeldia (ESP)	Euskaltel–Euskadi	+ 2' 47"
7	Félix García Casas (ESP)	BigMat–Auber 93	+ 3' 05"
8	Guido Trentin (ITA)	Cofidis	+ 3' 34"
9	David Millar (GBR)	Cofidis	+ 3' 36"
10	Jörg Jaksche (GER)	ONCE–Eroski	+ 3' 51"

== Stage 15 ==
22 September 2002 — Gijón to Alto de l'Angliru, 176.7 km (109.8 mi)

Stage 15 Results

Rank	Rider	Team	Time
1	Roberto Heras (ESP)	U.S. Postal Service	5h 01' 02"
2	Joseba Beloki (ESP)	ONCE–Eroski	+ 1' 35"
3	Francesco Casagrande (ITA)	Fassa Bortolo	+ 1' 41"
4	Iban Mayo (ESP)	Euskaltel–Euskadi	+ 1' 54"
5	Aitor González (ESP)	Kelme–Costa Blanca	+ 2' 16"
6	Danilo Di Luca (ITA)	Saeco–Longoni Sport	+ 2' 16"
7	Gilberto Simoni (ITA)	Saeco–Longoni Sport	+ 2' 16"
8	Ángel Casero (ESP)	Team Coast	+ 2' 22"
9	Fabian Jeker (SUI)	Milaneza–MSS	+ 2' 34"
10	Félix García Casas (ESP)	BigMat–Auber 93	+ 2' 42"

General classification after Stage 15

Rank	Rider	Team	Time
1	Roberto Heras (ESP)	U.S. Postal Service	55h 14' 08"
2	Aitor González (ESP)	Kelme–Costa Blanca	+ 35"
3	Óscar Sevilla (ESP)	Kelme–Costa Blanca	+ 1' 08"
4	Joseba Beloki (ESP)	ONCE–Eroski	+ 1' 57"
5	Iban Mayo (ESP)	Euskaltel–Euskadi	+ 2' 16"
6	Francesco Casagrande (ITA)	Fassa Bortolo	+ 3' 56"
7	Félix García Casas (ESP)	BigMat–Auber 93	+ 4' 05"
8	Gilberto Simoni (ITA)	Saeco–Longoni Sport	+ 4' 55"
9	Manuel Beltrán (ESP)	Team Coast	+ 5' 20"
10	Haimar Zubeldia (ESP)	Euskaltel–Euskadi	+ 5' 26"

== Stage 16 ==
24 September 2002 — Avilés to León, 154.7 km (96.1 mi)

Stage 16 Results

Rank	Rider	Team	Time
1	Santiago Botero (COL)	Kelme–Costa Blanca	3h 32' 07"
2	Luis Pérez (ESP)	Team Coast	s.t.
3	José Enrique Gutiérrez (ESP)	Kelme–Costa Blanca	+ 5"
4	Aitor Osa (ESP)	iBanesto.com	+ 5"
5	David Plaza (ESP)	Team Coast	+ 5"
6	Erik Zabel (GER)	Team Telekom	+ 8' 58"
7	Miguel Martin Perdiguero (ESP)	Acqua & Sapone–Cantina Tollo	+ 8' 58"
8	Gerrit Glomser (AUT)	Saeco–Longoni Sport	+ 8' 58"
9	Carlos Torrent (ESP)	Jazztel–Costa de Almería	+ 8' 58"
10	Mikel Artetxe (ESP)	Euskaltel–Euskadi	+ 8' 58"

General classification after Stage 16

Rank	Rider	Team	Time
1	Roberto Heras (ESP)	U.S. Postal Service	58h 55' 13"
2	Aitor González (ESP)	Kelme–Costa Blanca	+ 35"
3	Óscar Sevilla (ESP)	Kelme–Costa Blanca	+ 1' 08"
4	Joseba Beloki (ESP)	ONCE–Eroski	+ 1' 57"
5	Iban Mayo (ESP)	Euskaltel–Euskadi	+ 2' 16"
6	Francesco Casagrande (ITA)	Fassa Bortolo	+ 3' 56"
7	Félix García Casas (ESP)	BigMat–Auber 93	+ 4' 05"
8	Gilberto Simoni (ITA)	Saeco–Longoni Sport	+ 4' 55"
9	Manuel Beltrán (ESP)	Team Coast	+ 5' 20"
10	Haimar Zubeldia (ESP)	Euskaltel–Euskadi	+ 5' 26"

== Stage 17 ==
25 September 2002 — Benavente to Salamanca, 146.6 km (91.1 mi)

Stage 17 Results

Rank	Rider	Team	Time
1	Angelo Furlan (ITA)	Alessio	2h 58' 00"
2	Erik Zabel (GER)	Team Telekom	s.t.
3	Alessandro Petacchi (ITA)	Fassa Bortolo	s.t.
4	Sven Teutenberg (GER)	Phonak	s.t.
5	Gerrit Glomser (AUT)	Saeco–Longoni Sport	s.t.
6	Andrej Hauptman (SLO)	Tacconi Sport	s.t.
7	Paolo Bossoni (ITA)	Tacconi Sport	s.t.
8	Dennis Zanette (ITA)	Fassa Bortolo	s.t.
9	Ángel Edo (ESP)	Milaneza–MSS	s.t.
10	Ján Svorada (CZE)	Lampre–Daikin	s.t.

General classification after Stage 17

Rank	Rider	Team	Time
1	Roberto Heras (ESP)	U.S. Postal Service	61h 53' 13"
2	Aitor González (ESP)	Kelme–Costa Blanca	+ 35"
3	Óscar Sevilla (ESP)	Kelme–Costa Blanca	+ 1' 08"
4	Joseba Beloki (ESP)	ONCE–Eroski	+ 1' 57"
5	Iban Mayo (ESP)	Euskaltel–Euskadi	+ 2' 16"
6	Francesco Casagrande (ITA)	Fassa Bortolo	+ 3' 56"
7	Félix García Casas (ESP)	BigMat–Auber 93	+ 4' 05"
8	Gilberto Simoni (ITA)	Saeco–Longoni Sport	+ 4' 55"
9	Manuel Beltrán (ESP)	Team Coast	+ 5' 20"
10	Haimar Zubeldia (ESP)	Euskaltel–Euskadi	+ 5' 26"

== Stage 18 ==
26 September 2002 — Salamanca to La Covatilla, 193.7 km (120.4 mi)

Stage 18 Results

Rank	Rider	Team	Time
1	Santiago Blanco (ESP)	iBanesto.com	5h 04' 17"
2	Roberto Heras (ESP)	U.S. Postal Service	+ 39"
3	Juan Antonio Flecha (ESP)	iBanesto.com	+ 47"
4	Joseba Beloki (ESP)	ONCE–Eroski	+ 51"
5	Pietro Caucchioli (ITA)	Alessio	+ 1' 09"
6	Félix García Casas (ESP)	BigMat–Auber 93	+ 1' 09"
7	Óscar Sevilla (ESP)	Kelme–Costa Blanca	+ 1' 16"
8	Aitor González (ESP)	Kelme–Costa Blanca	+ 1' 16"
9	Ángel Casero (ESP)	Team Coast	+ 1' 26"
10	Francesco Casagrande (ITA)	Fassa Bortolo	+ 1' 31"

General classification after Stage 18

Rank	Rider	Team	Time
1	Roberto Heras (ESP)	U.S. Postal Service	66h 58' 09"
2	Aitor González (ESP)	Kelme–Costa Blanca	+ 1' 12"
3	Óscar Sevilla (ESP)	Kelme–Costa Blanca	+ 1' 45"
4	Joseba Beloki (ESP)	ONCE–Eroski	+ 2' 09"
5	Iban Mayo (ESP)	Euskaltel–Euskadi	+ 4' 15"
6	Félix García Casas (ESP)	BigMat–Auber 93	+ 4' 35"
7	Francesco Casagrande (ITA)	Fassa Bortolo	+ 4' 48"
8	Gilberto Simoni (ITA)	Saeco–Longoni Sport	+ 6' 04"
9	Ángel Casero (ESP)	Team Coast	+ 6' 18"
10	Manuel Beltrán (ESP)	Team Coast	+ 7' 00"

== Stage 19 ==
27 September 2002 — Béjar to Ávila, 177.8 km (110.5 mi)

Stage 19 Results

Rank	Rider	Team	Time
1	José Vicente Garcia Acosta (ESP)	iBanesto.com	4h 24' 27"
2	Aitor González (ESP)	Kelme–Costa Blanca	+ 2' 02"
3	Miguel Martin Perdiguero (ESP)	Acqua & Sapone–Cantina Tollo	+ 2' 06"
4	Óscar Sevilla (ESP)	Kelme–Costa Blanca	+ 2' 06"
5	Roberto Heras (ESP)	U.S. Postal Service	+ 2' 06"
6	Joseba Beloki (ESP)	ONCE–Eroski	+ 2' 06"
7	Iban Mayo (ESP)	Euskaltel–Euskadi	+ 2' 06"
8	Claus Michael Møller (DEN)	Milaneza–MSS	+ 2' 06"
9	Francesco Casagrande (ITA)	Fassa Bortolo	+ 2' 06"
10	Ángel Casero (ESP)	Team Coast	+ 2' 06"

General classification after Stage 19

Rank	Rider	Team	Time
1	Roberto Heras (ESP)	U.S. Postal Service	71h 24' 42"
2	Aitor González (ESP)	Kelme–Costa Blanca	+ 1' 08"
3	Óscar Sevilla (ESP)	Kelme–Costa Blanca	+ 1' 45"
4	Joseba Beloki (ESP)	ONCE–Eroski	+ 2' 09"
5	Iban Mayo (ESP)	Euskaltel–Euskadi	+ 4' 15"
6	Félix García Casas (ESP)	BigMat–Auber 93	+ 4' 43"
7	Francesco Casagrande (ITA)	Fassa Bortolo	+ 4' 48"
8	Gilberto Simoni (ITA)	Saeco–Longoni Sport	+ 6' 12"
9	Ángel Casero (ESP)	Team Coast	+ 6' 18"
10	Manuel Beltrán (ESP)	Team Coast	+ 7' 08"

== Stage 20 ==
28 September 2002 — Ávila to Warner Bros. Park, 141.2 km (87.7 mi)

Stage 20 Results

Rank	Rider	Team	Time
1	Angelo Furlan (ITA)	Alessio	3h 00' 08"
2	Alessandro Petacchi (ITA)	Fassa Bortolo	s.t.
3	Erik Zabel (GER)	Team Telekom	s.t.
4	Sven Teutenberg (GER)	Phonak	s.t.
5	Ján Svorada (CZE)	Lampre–Daikin	s.t.
6	Gerrit Glomser (AUT)	Saeco–Longoni Sport	s.t.
7	Alexei Sivakov (RUS)	BigMat–Auber 93	s.t.
8	Andrej Hauptman (SLO)	Tacconi Sport	s.t.
9	Ángel Edo (ESP)	Milaneza–MSS	s.t.
10	Juan Carlos Guillamón (ESP)	Jazztel–Costa de Almería	s.t.

General classification after Stage 20

Rank	Rider	Team	Time
1	Roberto Heras (ESP)	U.S. Postal Service	74h 24' 50"
2	Aitor González (ESP)	Kelme–Costa Blanca	+ 1' 08"
3	Óscar Sevilla (ESP)	Kelme–Costa Blanca	+ 1' 45"
4	Joseba Beloki (ESP)	ONCE–Eroski	+ 2' 09"
5	Iban Mayo (ESP)	Euskaltel–Euskadi	+ 4' 15"
6	Félix García Casas (ESP)	BigMat–Auber 93	+ 4' 43"
7	Francesco Casagrande (ITA)	Fassa Bortolo	+ 4' 48"
8	Gilberto Simoni (ITA)	Saeco–Longoni Sport	+ 6' 12"
9	Ángel Casero (ESP)	Team Coast	+ 6' 18"
10	Manuel Beltrán (ESP)	Team Coast	+ 7' 08"

== Stage 21 ==
29 September 2002 — Warner Bros. Park to Madrid (Santiago Bernabéu Stadium), 41.2 km (25.6 mi) (ITT)

Stage 21 Results

Rank	Rider	Team	Time
1	Aitor González (ESP)	Kelme–Costa Blanca	47' 54"
2	Ángel Casero (ESP)	Team Coast	+ 1' 23"
3	David Plaza (ESP)	Team Coast	+ 1' 45"
4	Santiago Botero (COL)	Kelme–Costa Blanca	+ 1' 55"
5	Joseba Beloki (ESP)	ONCE–Eroski	+ 2' 10"
6	Santos González (ESP)	Acqua & Sapone–Cantina Tollo	+ 2' 27"
7	Manuel Beltrán (ESP)	Team Coast	+ 2' 29"
8	Iban Mayo (ESP)	Euskaltel–Euskadi	+ 2' 35"
9	Daniel Becke (GER)	Team Coast	+ 2' 43"
10	Toni Tauler (ESP)	Kelme–Costa Blanca	+ 2' 45"

General classification after Stage 21

Rank	Rider	Team	Time
1	Aitor González (ESP)	Kelme–Costa Blanca	75h 13' 52"
2	Roberto Heras (ESP)	U.S. Postal Service	+ 2' 14"
3	Joseba Beloki (ESP)	ONCE–Eroski	+ 3' 11"
4	Óscar Sevilla (ESP)	Kelme–Costa Blanca	+ 3' 26"
5	Iban Mayo (ESP)	Euskaltel–Euskadi	+ 5' 42"
6	Ángel Casero (ESP)	Team Coast	+ 6' 33"
7	Francesco Casagrande (ITA)	Fassa Bortolo	+ 6' 38"
8	Félix García Casas (ESP)	BigMat–Auber 93	+ 6' 46"
9	Manuel Beltrán (ESP)	Team Coast	+ 8' 29"
10	Gilberto Simoni (ITA)	Saeco–Longoni Sport	+ 9' 22"
