= 2001 Volta a Catalunya =

Race details
- Dates: 21–28 June 2001
- Stages: 8
- Distance: 1,014.7 km (630.5 mi)
- Winning time: 26h 40' 14"

Results
	Winner	Joseba Beloki (ESP)	(ONCE–Eroski)
	Second	Igor González de Galdeano (ESP)	(ONCE–Eroski)
	Third	Fernando Escartín (ESP)	(Team Coast–Buffalo)
	Points	Joseba Beloki (ESP)	(ONCE–Eroski)
	Mountains	Félix Cárdenas (COL)	(Kelme–Costa Blanca)
	Sprints	Carlos Golbano (ESP)	(Jazztel–Costa de Almería)
	Team	iBanesto.com	

The 2001 Volta a Catalunya was the 81st edition of the Volta a Catalunya cycle race and was held from 21 June to 28 June 2001. The race started in Sabadell and finished at the Alt de la Rabassa in Andorra. The race was won by Joseba Beloki of the ONCE team.

== Teams ==
Seventeen teams of up to eight riders started the race:

- iBanesto.com
- Team Telekom
- Kelme–Costa Blanca
- U.S. Postal Service
- ONCE–Eroski
- Lampre–Daikin
- Euskaltel–Euskadi
- Mercatone Uno–Stream TV
- Domo–Farm Frites–Latexco
- Cantina Tollo–Acqua & Sapone
- Colchon Relax–Fuenlabrada
- Festina
- Mercury–Viatel
- Team Coast–Buffalo
- Crédit Agricole
- Jazztel–Costa de Almería
- Alessio

== Route ==
Stage characteristics and winners
Stage	Date	Course	Distance	Type	Winner
1	21 June	Sabadell	24.4 km (15.2 mi)	Team time trial	ONCE
2	22 June	Sabadell to Blanes	173.5 km (107.8 mi)		Max van Heeswijk (NED)
3	23 June	Blanes to L'Hospitalet de Llobregat	148.6 km (92.3 mi)		Romāns Vainšteins (LAT)
4	24 June	Barcelona to Barcelona	115.8 km (72.0 mi)		Joseba Beloki (ESP)
5	25 June	La Granada to Vila-seca	178.2 km (110.7 mi)		Óscar Laguna (ESP)
6	26 June	Les Borges Blanques to Boí Taüll	184.2 km (114.5 mi)		Ivan Gotti (ITA)
7	27 June	Taüll to Els Cortals D'Encamps	176.1 km (109.4 mi)		Daniele De Paoli (ITA)
8	28 June	Sant Julià de Lòria to Alt de la Rabassa	13.9 km (8.6 mi)	Individual time trial	Joseba Beloki (ESP)

== General classification ==
Final general classification

Rank	Rider	Team	Time
1	Joseba Beloki (ESP)	ONCE–Eroski	26h 40' 14"
2	Igor González de Galdeano (ESP)	ONCE–Eroski	+ 33"
3	Fernando Escartín (ESP)	Team Coast–Buffalo	+ 41"
4	Aitor González (ESP)	Kelme–Costa Blanca	+ 1' 44"
5	Óscar Sevilla (ESP)	Kelme–Costa Blanca	+ 3' 03"
6	Eladio Jiménez (ESP)	iBanesto.com	+ 3' 04"
7	Haimar Zubeldia (ESP)	Euskaltel–Euskadi	+ 3' 40"
8	Marzio Bruseghin (ITA)	iBanesto.com	+ 3' 57"
9	Unai Osa (ESP)	iBanesto.com	+ 5' 11"
10	Juan Antonio Flecha (ESP)	Colchon Relax–Fuenlabrada	+ 5' 28"
