= 2000 Tour de Romandie =

Race details
- Dates: 2–7 May 2000
- Stages: 5 + Prologue
- Distance: 821.5 km (510.5 mi)
- Winning time: 21h 01' 41"

Results
	Winner	Paolo Savoldelli (ITA)	(Saeco–Valli & Valli)
	Second	Joseba Beloki (ESP)	(Festina)
	Third	Laurent Dufaux (SUI)	(Saeco–Valli & Valli)

The 2000 Tour de Romandie was the 54th edition of the Tour de Romandie cycle race and was held from 2 May to 7 May 2000. The race started in Locarno and finished in Geneva. The race was won by Paolo Savoldelli of the Saeco team.

== Route ==
Stage schedule
Stage	Date	Route	Distance	Type	Winner
P	2 May	Locarno	6.5 km (4.0 mi)	Prologue	Paolo Savoldelli (ITA)
1	3 May	Locarno to Le Bouveret	224.3 km (139.4 mi)	Flat stage	Mario Cipollini (ITA)
2	4 May	Montreux to La Chaux-de-Fonds	162.1 km (100.7 mi)	Hilly stage	Laurent Dufaux (SUI)
3a	5 May	Neuchâtel to Orbe	66.6 km (41.4 mi)	Flat stage	Eddy Mazzoleni (ITA)
3b	5 May	Orbe to Orbe	24.2 km (15.0 mi)	Individual time trial	Joseba Beloki (ESP)
4	6 May	Orbe to Leysin	160.6 km (99.8 mi)	Mountain stage	Andrea Noè (ITA)
5	7 May	Aigle to Geneva	177.8 km (110.5 mi)	Flat stage	Mario Cipollini (ITA)

== Stages ==
=== Prologue ===
2 May 2000 — Locarno, 6.5 km (4.0 mi), individual time trial (ITT)

Prologue Result
Rank	Rider	Team	Time
1	Paolo Savoldelli (ITA)	Saeco–Valli & Valli	7' 31"
2	Miguel Ángel Peña (ESP)	ONCE–Deutsche Bank	+ 10"
3	Íñigo Cuesta (ESP)	ONCE–Deutsche Bank	+ 11"
4	Pavel Padrnos (CZE)	Saeco–Valli & Valli	+ 12"
5	Dirk Müller (GER)	Post Swiss Team	+ 13"
6	Gabriele Missaglia (ITA)	Lampre–Daikin	+ 13"
7	David Millar (GBR)	Cofidis	+ 13"
8	Nicolas Jalabert (FRA)	ONCE–Deutsche Bank	+ 14"
9	Romāns Vainšteins (LAT)	Vini Caldirola–Sidermec	+ 15"
10	Matthias Buxhofer (AUT)	Phonak	+ 15"

== General classification ==
Final general classification
Rank	Rider	Team	Time
1	Paolo Savoldelli (ITA)	Saeco–Valli & Valli	21h 01' 41"
2	Joseba Beloki (ESP)	Festina	+ 12"
3	Laurent Dufaux (SUI)	Saeco–Valli & Valli	+ 27"
4	Andrea Noè (ITA)	Mapei–Quick-Step	+ 37"
5	Chann McRae (USA)	Mapei–Quick-Step	+ 1' 02"
6	Gilberto Simoni (ITA)	Lampre–Daikin	+ 1' 25"
7	José Luis Rubiera (ESP)	Kelme–Costa Blanca	+ 1' 31"
8	Roland Meier (SUI)	Cofidis	+ 1' 37"
9	Raimondas Rumšas (LTU)	Fassa Bortolo	+ 1' 38"
10	Wladimir Belli (ITA)	Fassa Bortolo	+ 1' 38"
