= 2002 Tirreno–Adriatico =

Race details
- Dates: 14–20 March 2002
- Stages: 7
- Distance: 1,049.7 km (652.3 mi)
- Winning time: 28h 45' 24"

Results
Jersey awarded to the overall winner	Winner	Erik Dekker (NED)	(Rabobank)
	Second	Danilo Di Luca (ITA)	(Saeco–Longoni Sport)
	Third	Óscar Freire (ESP)	(Mapei–Quick-Step)
	Points	Erik Zabel (GER)	(Team Telekom)
	Mountains	Ruggero Marzoli (ITA)	(Mobilvetta Design–Formaggi Trentini)
	Team	(Belgium) Mapei–Quick-Step	

The 2002 Tirreno–Adriatico was the 37th edition of the Tirreno–Adriatico cycle race and was held from 14 March to 20 March 2002. The race started in Massa Lubrense and finished in San Benedetto del Tronto. The race was won by Erik Dekker of the Rabobank team.

== Teams ==
Twenty-five teams, containing a total of 200 riders, participated in the race:

- Gerolsteiner
- Acqua & Sapone–Cantina Tollo
- Alessio
- Index–Alexia Alluminio
- Ceramiche Panaria–Fiordo
- Cofidis
- Crédit Agricole
- Domo–Farm Frites
- Fassa Bortolo
- iBanesto.com
- Kelme–Costa Blanca
- Lampre–Daikin
- Lotto–Adecco
- Mapei–Quick-Step
- Mercatone Uno
- Mobilvetta Design–Formaggi Trentini
- ONCE–Eroski
- Phonak
- Rabobank
- Saeco–Longoni Sport
- Tacconi Sport
- Team Coast
- CSC–Tiscali
- Team Telekom
- U.S. Postal Service

== Route ==
Stage characteristics and winners
Stage	Date	Course	Distance	Type	Winner
1	14 March	Massa Lubrense to Sorrento	124 km (77 mi)		Erik Zabel (GER)
2	15 March	Sorrento to Frosinone	212 km (132 mi)		Paolo Bettini (ITA)
3	16 March	Anagni to Rocca di Cambio	180 km (110 mi)		Danilo Di Luca (ITA)
4	17 March	Rieti to Rieti	12.7 km (7.9 mi)	Individual time trial	Erik Dekker (NED)
5	18 March	Rieti to Torricella Sicura	150 km (93 mi)		Danilo Di Luca (ITA)
6	19 March	Rapagnano to Montegranaro	208 km (129 mi)		Franco Pellizotti (ITA)
7	20 March	San Benedetto del Tronto to San Benedetto del Tronto	162 km (101 mi)		Mario Cipollini (ITA)

== General classification ==
Final general classification

Rank	Rider	Team	Time
1	Erik Dekker (NED)	Rabobank	28h 45' 24"
2	Danilo Di Luca (ITA)	Saeco–Longoni Sport	+ 18"
3	Óscar Freire (ESP)	Mapei–Quick-Step	+ 18"
4	Paolo Bettini (ITA)	Mapei–Quick-Step	+ 23"
5	Ruslan Ivanov (MDA)	Alessio	+ 23"
6	Guido Trentin (ITA)	Cofidis	+ 24"
7	Paolo Savoldelli (ITA)	Index–Alexia Alluminio	+ 29"
8	Jan Hruška (CZE)	ONCE–Eroski	+ 30"
9	Franco Pellizotti (ITA)	Alessio	+ 32"
10	Jörg Jaksche (GER)	ONCE–Eroski	+ 36"
