= 2002 Vuelta a España =

57th edition of the Vuelta a España

Race details
- Dates: 7–29 September
- Stages: 21
- Distance: 2,957 km (1,837 mi)
- Winning time: 75h 13' 52"

Results
Jersey awarded to the overall winner	Winner	Aitor González (ESP)	(Kelme–Costa Blanca)
	Second	Roberto Heras (ESP)	(U.S. Postal)
	Third	Joseba Beloki (ESP)	(ONCE–Eroski)
Jersey awarded to the points classification winner	Points	Erik Zabel (GER)	(Team Telekom)
Jersey awarded to the mountains classification winner	Mountains	Aitor Osa (ESP)	(iBanesto.com)
Jersey awarded to the combination classification winner	Combination	Roberto Heras (ESP)	(U.S. Postal)

The 57th edition of the Vuelta a España (Tour of Spain), a long-distance bicycle stage race and one of the three grand tours, was held from 7 September to 29 September 2002. It consisted of 21 stages covering a total of 2,957 km (1,837 mi), and was won by Aitor González of the Kelme–Costa Blanca cycling team.

Joseba Beloki, the second-place finisher of the 2002 Tour de France was part of the winning ONCE–Eroski team that won the opening team time trial of the race. Beloki held the lead until the fifth stage when he lost it to a teammate but on the sixth stage which was won by Roberto Heras. Beloki lost considerable time to other general classification contenders Óscar Sevilla, Aitor González and Heras. Sevilla took the leader's jersey which he had worn for much of the previous edition of the Vuelta. After the first individual time trial, his teammate Aitor González was within one second of the jersey. On stage 15, González increased the pace of the group and put Sevilla in difficulty. Heras profited from this and attacked to take the stage win and the lead. Heras kept the lead until the final day when there was an individual time trial. Heras started the day with a lead of one minute and eight seconds over González but he lost this in the first 25 km of the time trial. González took the lead and won the Vuelta, Heras came second and Beloki recovered to eventually finish third overall. The Vuelta was also marked by three stage wins of Italian sprinter Mario Cipollini who retired from the race after his third stage win to prepare for the World Championships.

During stage 15 riders climbed the Alto de l'Angliru in rain. Team cars stalled on the steepest part, some unable to restart because their tires slipped on messages painted by fans. Riders were caught behind them and others had to ride with flat tires because mechanics could not reach them. David Millar crashed three times and protested by handing in his race number a metre from the line. The judges ruled he had not finished the stage and he left the race. He regretted his temper – he had been ninth – and apologised to his team.

== Route ==
List of stages
Stage	Date	Course	Distance	Type	Winner
1	7 September	Valencia to Valencia	24.6 km (15 mi)	Team time trial	ONCE–Eroski
2	8 September	Valencia to Alcoy	144.7 km (90 mi)		Danilo Di Luca (ITA)
3	9 September	San Vicente del Raspeig to Murcia	134.2 km (83 mi)		Mario Cipollini (ITA)
4	10 September	Águilas to Roquetas de Mar	149.5 km (93 mi)		Mario Cipollini (ITA)
5	11 September	El Ejido to Sierra Nevada	198 km (123 mi)		Guido Trentin (ITA)
6	12 September	Granada to Sierra de la Pandera	153.1 km (95 mi)		Roberto Heras (ESP)
7	13 September	Jaén to Málaga	196.8 km (122 mi)		Mario Cipollini (ITA)
8	14 September	Málaga to Ubrique	173.6 km (108 mi)		Aitor González (ESP)
9	15 September	Córdoba to Córdoba	130.2 km (81 mi)		Pablo Lastras (ESP)
10	16 September	Córdoba to Córdoba	36.5 km (23 mi)	Individual time trial	Aitor González (ESP)
	17 September			Rest day	
11	18 September	Alcobendas to Collado Villalba	166.1 km (103 mi)		Pablo Lastras (ESP)
12	19 September	Segovia to Burgos	210.5 km (131 mi)		Alessandro Petacchi (ITA)
13	20 September	Burgos to Santander	189.8 km (118 mi)		Giovanni Lombardi (ITA)
14	21 September	Santander to Gijón	190.2 km (118 mi)		Serguei Smetanine (RUS)
15	22 September	Gijón to Alto de l'Angliru	176.7 km (110 mi)		Roberto Heras (ESP)
	23 September			Rest day	
16	24 September	Avilés to León	154.7 km (96 mi)		Santiago Botero (COL)
17	25 September	Benavente to Salamanca	146.6 km (91 mi)		Angelo Furlan (ITA)
18	26 September	Salamanca to La Covatilla	193.7 km (120 mi)		Santiago Blanco (ESP)
19	27 September	Béjar to Ávila	177.8 km (110 mi)		José Vicente Garcia Acosta (ESP)
20	28 September	Ávila to Warner Bros. Park	141.2 km (88 mi)		Angelo Furlan (ITA)
21	29 September	Warner Bros. Park to Madrid (Santiago Bernabéu Stadium)	41.2 km (26 mi)	Individual time trial	Aitor González (ESP)
	Total		2,957 km (1,837 mi)		

== Jersey Progress ==
Stage	Winner	General classification	Points classification	Mountains classification	Combination classification	Team classification
1	ONCE–Eroski	Joseba Beloki	no award	no award	Joseba Beloki	ONCE–Eroski
2	Danilo Di Luca	Joseba Beloki	Danilo Di Luca	Médéric Clain	Vitoriano Fernandez	ONCE–Eroski
3	Mario Cipollini	Joseba Beloki	Erik Zabel	Médéric Clain	Médéric Clain	ONCE–Eroski
4	Mario Cipollini	Joseba Beloki	Erik Zabel	Médéric Clain	Vitoriano Fernandez	ONCE–Eroski
5	Guido Trentin	Mikel Zarrabeitia	Erik Zabel	Médéric Clain	Guido Trentin	ONCE–Eroski
6	Roberto Heras	Óscar Sevilla	Erik Zabel	Médéric Clain	Félix García Casas	ONCE–Eroski
7	Mario Cipollini	Óscar Sevilla	Erik Zabel	Médéric Clain	Félix García Casas	ONCE–Eroski
8	Aitor González	Óscar Sevilla	Erik Zabel	Gilberto Simoni	Óscar Sevilla	ONCE–Eroski
9	Pablo Lastras	Óscar Sevilla	Erik Zabel	Gilberto Simoni	Óscar Sevilla	ONCE–Eroski
10	Aitor González	Óscar Sevilla	Erik Zabel	Gilberto Simoni	Óscar Sevilla	Kelme–Costa Blanca
11	Pablo Lastras	Óscar Sevilla	Erik Zabel	Gilberto Simoni	Óscar Sevilla	Kelme–Costa Blanca
12	Alessandro Petacchi	Óscar Sevilla	Erik Zabel	Gilberto Simoni	Óscar Sevilla	Kelme–Costa Blanca
13	Giovanni Lombardi	Óscar Sevilla	Erik Zabel	Gilberto Simoni	Óscar Sevilla	Team Coast
14	Sergei Smetanine	Óscar Sevilla	Erik Zabel	Gilberto Simoni	Óscar Sevilla	Team Coast
15	Roberto Heras	Roberto Heras	Erik Zabel	Gilberto Simoni	Roberto Heras	Kelme–Costa Blanca
16	Santiago Botero	Roberto Heras	Erik Zabel	Aitor Osa	Roberto Heras	Kelme–Costa Blanca
17	Angelo Furlan	Roberto Heras	Erik Zabel	Aitor Osa	Roberto Heras	Kelme–Costa Blanca
18	Santiago Blanco	Roberto Heras	Erik Zabel	Roberto Heras	Roberto Heras	Kelme–Costa Blanca
19	José Vicente García Acosta	Roberto Heras	Erik Zabel	Aitor Osa	Roberto Heras	Kelme–Costa Blanca
20	Angelo Furlan	Roberto Heras	Erik Zabel	Aitor Osa	Roberto Heras	Kelme–Costa Blanca
21	Aitor González	Aitor González	Erik Zabel	Aitor Osa	Roberto Heras	Kelme–Costa Blanca
Final		Aitor González	Erik Zabel	Aitor Osa	Roberto Heras	Kelme–Costa Blanca

== General classification (final) ==
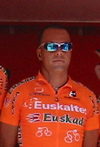
Aitor González (pictured in 2005), won the general classification.

Rank	Rider	Team	Time
1	(Spain) Aitor González	Kelme–Costa Blanca	75h13'52"
2	(Spain) Roberto Heras	U.S. Postal	2'14"
3	(Spain) Joseba Beloki	ONCE–Eroski	3'11"
4	(Spain) Óscar Sevilla	Kelme–Costa Blanca	3'26"
5	(Spain) Iban Mayo	Euskaltel–Euskadi	5'42"
6	(Spain) Ángel Casero	Team Coast	6'33"
7	(Italy) Francesco Casagrande	Fassa Bortolo	6'38"
8	(Spain) Félix García Casas	BigMat–Auber 93	6'46"
9	(Spain) Manuel Beltrán	Team Coast	8'29"
10	(Italy) Gilberto Simoni	Saeco–Longoni Sport	9'22"
11	(Spain) Haimar Zubeldia	Euskaltel–Euskadi	9'49"
12	(Denmark) Claus Michael Møller	Milaneza–MSS	10'16"
13	(Switzerland) Fabian Jeker	Milaneza–MSS	11'45"
14	(Spain) David Plaza	Team Coast	11'50"
15	(Italy) Guido Trentin	Cofidis	15'27"
16	(Portugal) Rui Sousa	Milaneza–MSS	16'36"
17	(Spain) Pablo Lastras	iBanesto.com	19'33"
18	(Slovenia) Tadej Valjavec	Fassa Bortolo	23'11"
19	(Spain) Carlos García Quesada	Kelme–Costa Blanca	24'01"
20	(Italy) Danilo Di Luca	Saeco–Longoni Sport	30'35"
21	(Spain) Mikel Zarrabeitia	ONCE–Eroski	31'57"
22	(Spain) Luis Pérez	Team Coast	39'42"
23	(Italy) Pietro Caucchioli	Alessio	43'54"
24	(Croatia) Vladimir Miholjević	Alessio	50'13"
25	(United States) Christian Vande Velde	U.S. Postal	52'50"
