= 2004 GP Ouest-France =

Race details
- Dates: 29 August 2004
- Stages: 1
- Distance: 198 km (123.0 mi)
- Winning time: 4h 31' 27"

Results
	Winner	Didier Rous (FRA)	(Brioches La Boulangère)
	Second	Serge Baguet (BEL)	(Lotto–Domo)
	Third	Guido Trentin (ITA)	(Cofidis)

The 2004 GP Ouest-France was the 68th edition of the GP Ouest-France cycle race and was held on 29 August 2004. The race started and finished in Plouay. The race was won by Didier Rous of the Brioches La Boulangère team.

== General classification ==
Final general classification

Rank	Rider	Team	Time
1	Didier Rous (FRA)	Brioches La Boulangère	4h 31' 27"
2	Serge Baguet (BEL)	Lotto–Domo	+ 0"
3	Guido Trentin (ITA)	Cofidis	+ 2"
4	Danilo Hondo (GER)	Gerolsteiner	+ 2"
5	Giulio Tomi (ITA)	Vini Caldirola–Nobili Rubinetterie	+ 2"
6	Vladimir Duma (UKR)	Landbouwkrediet–Colnago	+ 2"
7	Patrick Calcagni (SUI)	Vini Caldirola–Nobili Rubinetterie	+ 2"
8	Cédric Vasseur (FRA)	Cofidis	+ 2"
9	Sergio Barbero (ITA)	Lampre	+ 2"
10	Fabian Wegmann (GER)	Gerolsteiner	+ 2"
