= Jörg Jaksche =

German cyclist

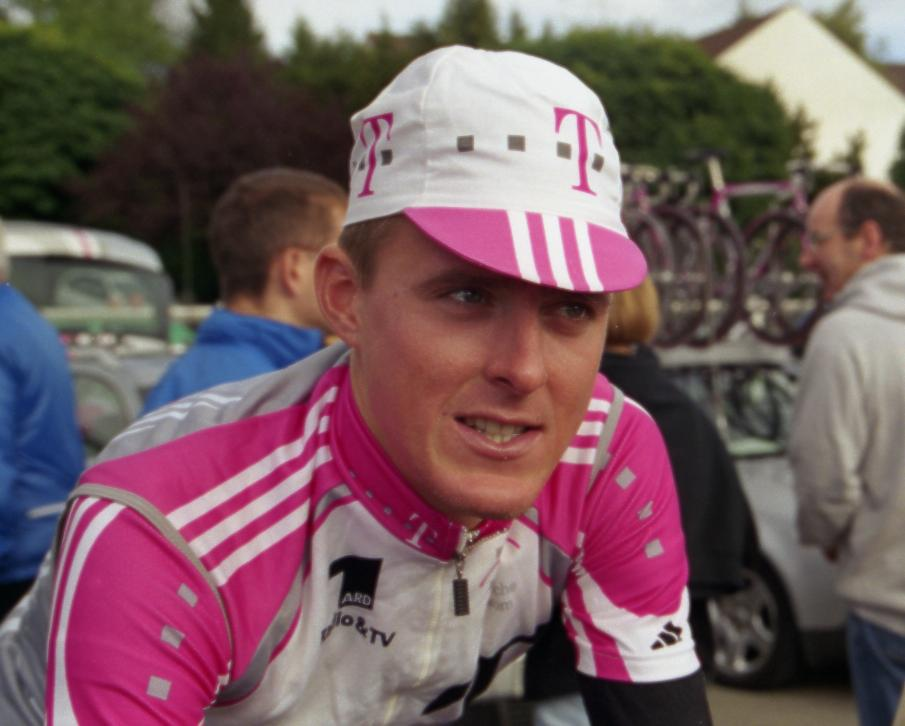
- Jaksche at the 1999 Paris–Tours

Personal information
- Full name: Jörg Armin Jaksche
- Born: 23 July 1976 (age 50) Fürth, Germany
- Height: 1.84 m (6 ft 0 in)
- Weight: 69 kg (152 lb)

Cycling career
- Sport: Cycling
- Current team: Retired
- Discipline: Road
- Role: Rider
- Rider type: Climber

Professional teams
- 1997–1998: Team Polti
- 1999–2000: Team Telekom
- 2001–2003: ONCE–Eroski
- 2004: Team CSC
- 2005–2006: Liberty Seguros–Würth
- 2007: Tinkoff Credit Systems

Major wins
- Paris–Nice (2004)

Jörg Armin Jaksche (born 23 July 1976 in Fürth) is a German former road bicycle racer. In 2007 Jaksche admitted he was guilty of blood doping.

== Biography ==
Jaksche has been cycling professionally since 1997, racing for the teams Polti (1997–1998), Team Telekom (1998–2000), ONCE (2001–2003), CSC (2004), Liberty Seguros–Würth/Astana (2005–2006) and Tinkoff Credit Systems in 2007.

In 2004, he won the Tour Mediterranean and the Paris–Nice race.

In the 2005 Tour de France, Jaksche finished 16th overall, the best result of his six participations in the Tour. He had been 18th at the 1998 Tour de France and 17th at the 2003 Tour de France.

At the 2006 Tour de Suisse, Jaksche finished on the podium with a third-place finish.

Jaksche is now living in Sydney, Australia studying a Master of International Business at the University of New South Wales.

== Doping ==
Jaksche was one of the nine riders held out of the 2006 Tour de France after being identified by investigators in the Operación Puerto investigation. On 30 June 2007, Jaksche admitted he was guilty of blood doping and that he was the Bella mentioned in the documents confiscated from Fuentes' clinic.

== Major results ==
1993
2nd Junior road race, National Road Championships
1994
1st Junior road race, National Road Championships
3rd Overall Driedaagse van Axel
1996
1st Stage 1 Rapport Toer
2nd Overall Sachsen-Tour
1997
1st World Military Road race Championships
3rd World Military Time trial Championships
1998
3rd Road race, National Road Championships
1999
10th Züri-Metzgete
2000
4th Overall Volta a Catalunya
10th Overall Critérium International
2001
1st Stage 1 Volta a Catalunya (TTT)
3rd La Flèche Wallonne
8th Overall Paris–Nice
9th Gran Premio Miguel Induráin
10th Giro del Piemonte
2002
1st Stage 4 Tour de France (TTT)
1st Stage 1 Vuelta a España (TTT)
6th Overall Deutschland Tour
6th Overall Grand Prix du Midi Libre
7th Gran Premio Miguel Induráin
7th Overall Vuelta a la Comunidad Valenciana
10th Overall Tirreno–Adriatico
2003
1st Stage 1 Vuelta a España (TTT)
4th Overall Paris–Nice
4th Overall Deutschland Tour
2004
1st Overall Paris–Nice

1st Stage 1

1st Overall Tour Méditerranéen

1st Stage 5

3rd Overall Tour de Luxembourg
2005
3rd Overall Critérium International
4th Overall Deutschland Tour
5th Overall Paris–Nice
2006
2nd Overall Tirreno–Adriatico
3rd Overall Tour de Suisse
4th Overall Tour de Romandie
2007
1st Overall Circuit de Lorraine

1st Stage 5

2nd Overall Euskal Bizikleta

=== Grand Tour general classification results timeline ===
Grand Tour	1998	1999	2000	2001	2002	2003	2004	2005
Giro d'Italia	—	—	—	—	—	—	—	—
Tour de France	18	80	—	29	31	17	—	16
Vuelta a España	—	35	—	73	DNF	129	44	—

Legend
—	Did not compete
DNF	Did not finish

== See also ==
- List of doping cases in cycling
- List of sportspeople sanctioned for doping offences
