= Juan Carlos Guillamón =

Spanish bicycle racer

Personal information
- Full name: Juan Carlos Guillamón Ruiz
- Born: 24 November 1974 (age 51) Murcia, Spain

Cycling career
- Sport: Cycling
- Current team: Retired
- Discipline: Road
- Role: Rider

Professional teams
- 1998–2000: Gresco–Tavira–Progecer
- 2001–2003: Jazztel-Costa de Almería

Juan Carlos Guillamón Ruiz (born 24 November 1974 in Murcia) is a Spanish former cyclist.

== Major results ==
1996
1st Stage 6 Circuito Montañés
1999
1st Troféu Joaquim Agostinho
2002
1st Road race, National Road Championships
