= Guido Trentin =

Italian cyclist

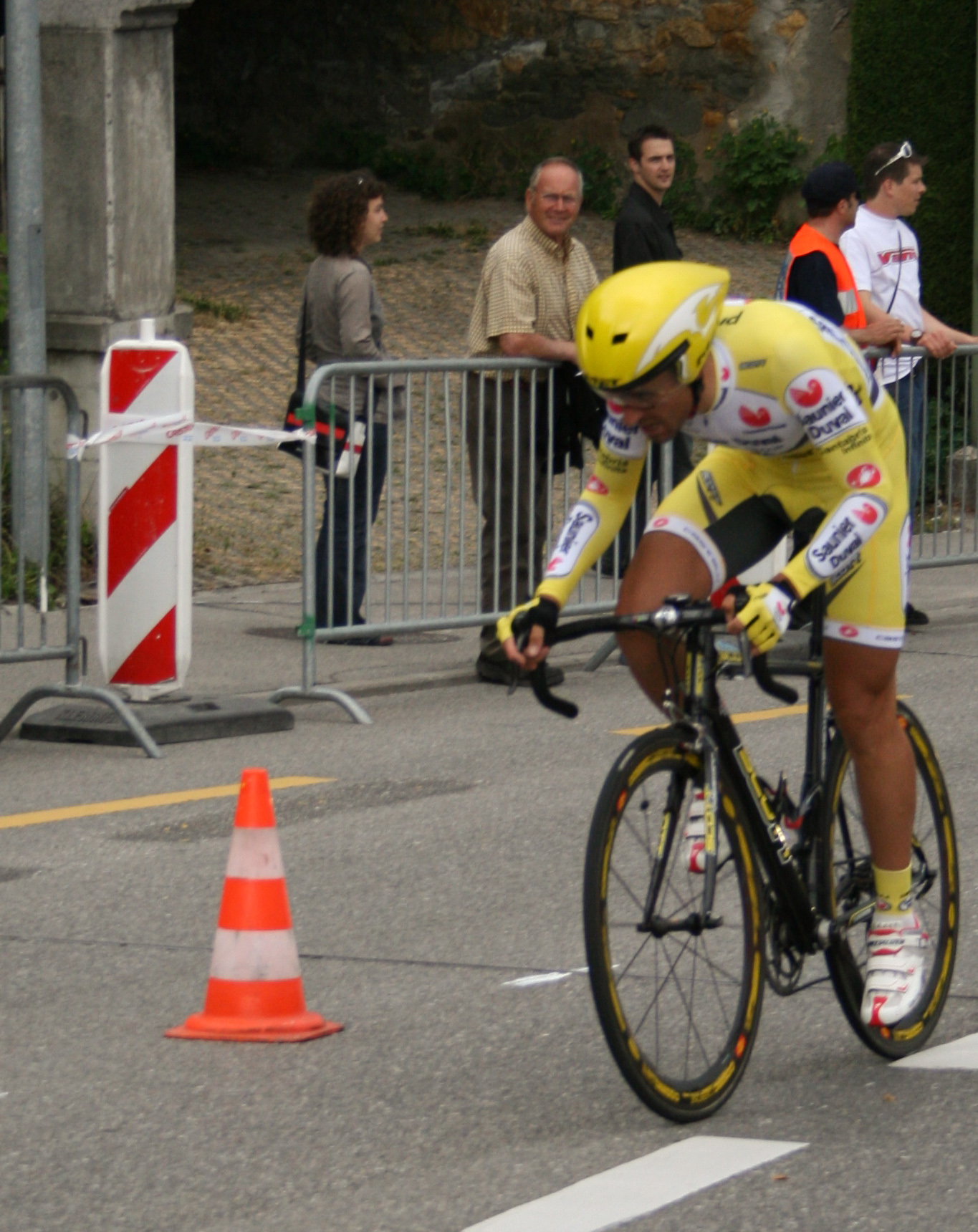
- Trentin at the 2007 Tour de Romandie

Personal information
- Full name: Guido Trentin
- Born: 24 November 1975 (age 50) Grandate, Italy
- Height: 1.80 m (5 ft 11 in)
- Weight: 65 kg (143 lb)

Cycling career
- Sport: Cycling
- Discipline: Road
- Role: Rider

Professional teams
- 1999–2000: Vini Caldirola
- 2001–2005: Cofidis
- 2006–2007: Saunier Duval–Prodir

Major wins
- Grand Tours Vuelta a España 1 individual stage (2002)

Guido Trentin (born 24 November 1975) is an Italian former professional road bicycle racer. His greatest achievement was winning stage 5 of the 2002 Vuelta a España.

== Career ==
Trentin turned professional in 1999 with the Italian Vini Caldirola team and won the Tour Trans Canada stage race in his first year as a professional. In 2000 Trentin, riding his first Tour de France, placed second in the young rider classification behind Francisco Mancebo. Trentin moved onto the Cofidis team in 2001, and spent five years with the French squad. Trentin recorded three wins beyond his stage victory in the 2002 Vuelta a España: overall victory in the 2003 Tour du Poitou Charentes et de la Vienne and stage wins in the 2005 Tour de Wallonie and 2005 Troféu Joaquim Agostinho.

After the 2007 season, Trentin left the Saunier team and retired at the end of the year.

== Major results ==
1993
2nd Overall Giro della Lunigiana
1997
1st Overall Triptyque Ardennais
1999
1st Overall Tour Trans Canada
6th Trofeo dello Scalatore
8th Trofeo Pantalica
2001
7th Overall Euskal Bizikleta
2002
1st Overall Tour du Poitou-Charentes
1st Stage 5 Vuelta a España
2nd Overall Tour du Limousin
6th Overall Tirreno–Adriatico
2003
3rd Japan Cup
7th Overall Volta a Catalunya
9th Giro di Lombardia
2004
2nd Polynormande
3rd GP Ouest-France
2005
1st Stage 5 Trofeú Joaquim Agostinho
3rd Overall Tour de Wallonie

1st Stage 4

=== Grand Tour general classification results timeline ===
Grand Tour	2000	2001	2002	2003	2004	2005	2006
Giro d'Italia	—	—	—	—	—	40	30
Tour de France	18	45	—	63	—	—	—
Vuelta a España	—	74	15	19	76	—	—

Legend
—	Did not compete
DNF	Did not finish
