= Gerrit Glomser =

Austrian cyclist

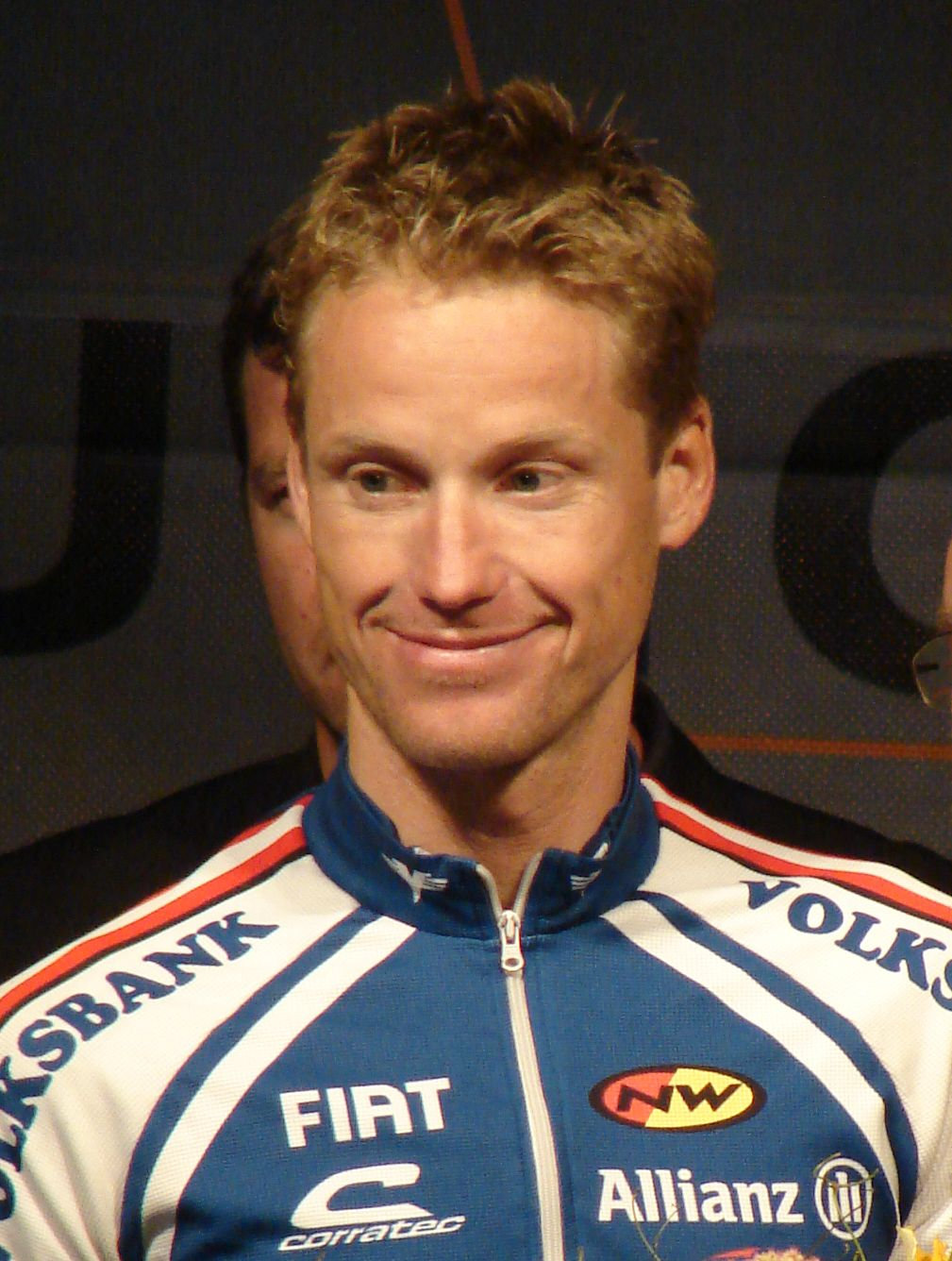
- Glomser in 2007

Personal information
- Full name: Gerrit Glomser
- Born: 1 April 1975 (age 51) Salzburg, Austria

Cycling career
- Sport: Cycling
- Current team: Tirol KTM Cycling Team
- Discipline: Road
- Role: Rider (retired); Directeur sportif

Professional teams
- 1998–2000: Scrigno–Gaerne
- 2001: Post Swiss Team
- 2002–2004: Saeco–Longoni Sport
- 2005: Lampre–Caffita
- 2006–2009: Vorarlberger

Managerial team
- 2019–: Tirol KTM Cycling Team

Major wins
- National Road Race Championships (2005)

Gerrit Glomser (born 1 April 1975 in Salzburg) is an Austrian former racing cyclist, who currently works as a directeur sportif for UCI Continental team Tirol KTM Cycling Team. He turned professional in 1998, and won the Austrian National Road Race Championships in 2005.

== Major results ==
1992
9th Road race, UCI Juniors Road World Championships
1995
3rd Road race, National Road Championships
1997
1st Trofeo Città di Brescia
3rd Road race, UCI Under-23 Road World Championships
3rd Road race, UEC European Under-23 Road Championships
1998
4th Giro della Romagna
9th Grand Prix Pino Cerami
1999
8th Coppa Bernocchi
2000
1st National Cyclo-cross Championships
1st Stage 6 Tour of Austria
9th Coppa Ugo Agostoni
2001
2nd Road race, National Road Championships
8th Overall Tour of Austria
8th Stausee-Rundfahrt Klingnau
2002
1st Overall Tour of Austria

1st Stage 3

6th Gran Premio de Llodio
9th Coppa Ugo Agostoni
2003
1st Overall Tour of Austria

1st Stages 2 & 3

2nd National Cyclo-cross Championships
5th Milano–Torino
7th Japan Cup
2004
1st Stage 4 Tour of Austria
3rd Trofeo Città di Castelfidardo
2005
1st Road race, National Road Championships
2006
3rd National Cyclo-cross Championships
8th Overall Tour of Austria
2007
7th Overall Tour of Austria

1st Stage 6

7th GP Triberg-Schwarzwald
7th Münsterland Giro
8th Overall Tour de Suisse
