= Joseba Beloki =

Spanish cyclist (born 1973)

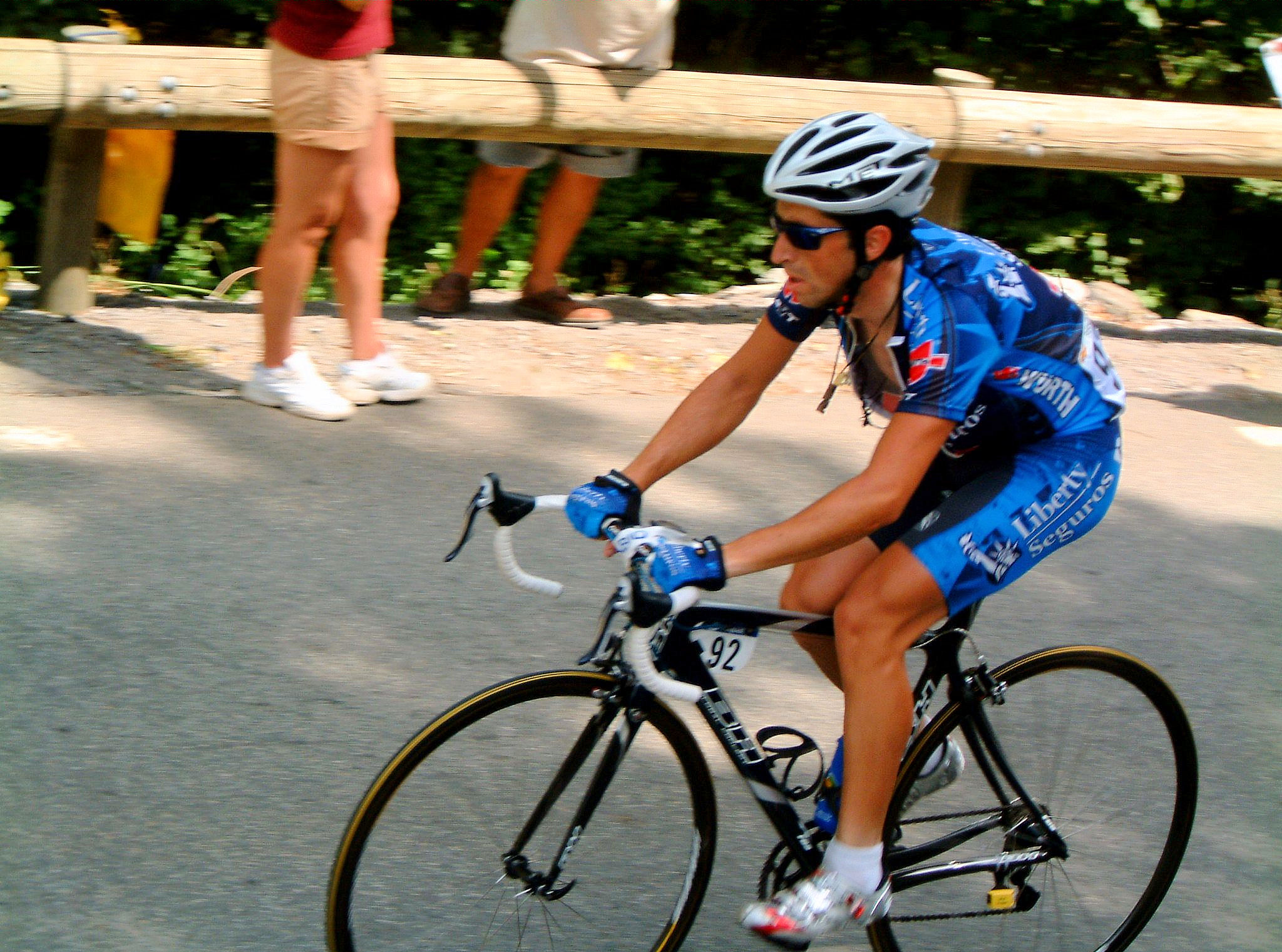
- Joseba Beloki on Col de Peyresourde in 2005

Personal information
- Full name: Joseba Beloki Dorronsoro
- Born: 12 August 1973 (age 53) Lazkao, Basque Country, Spain
- Height: 1.78 m (5 ft 10 in)
- Weight: 68 kg (150 lb; 10 st 10 lb)

Cycling career
- Sport: Cycling
- Discipline: Road
- Role: Rider
- Rider type: Climbing specialist

Professional teams
- 1998–1999: Euskaltel–Euskadi
- 2000: Festina
- 2001–2003: ONCE–Eroski
- 2004: Brioches La Boulangère
- 2004: Saunier Duval–Prodir
- 2005–2006: Liberty Seguros–Würth

Major wins
- Grand Tours Vuelta a España 1 TTT stage (2002) Stage races Volta a Catalunya (2001)

Joseba Beloki Dorronsoro (born 12 August 1973) is a Spanish Basque former professional road bicycle racer.

== Tour successes ==
Beloki turned professional in 1998 with Euskaltel–Euskadi, joined Festina in 2000, and then ONCE–Eroski in 2001. A strong climber in the high mountains and a top performer in individual time trials, he made it to the podium in each of his first three rides in the Tour de France: in 2000 (3rd place), 2001 (3rd place) and 2002 (2nd place). He is the only runner-up during Lance Armstrong's run of seven consecutive Tour wins to have not been found guilty of doping, though he was not retroactively awarded the victory in the general classification of 2002 after Armstrong's wins were stripped. In 2001, Beloki also finished first overall in the Volta a Catalunya.

== Crash and recovery ==
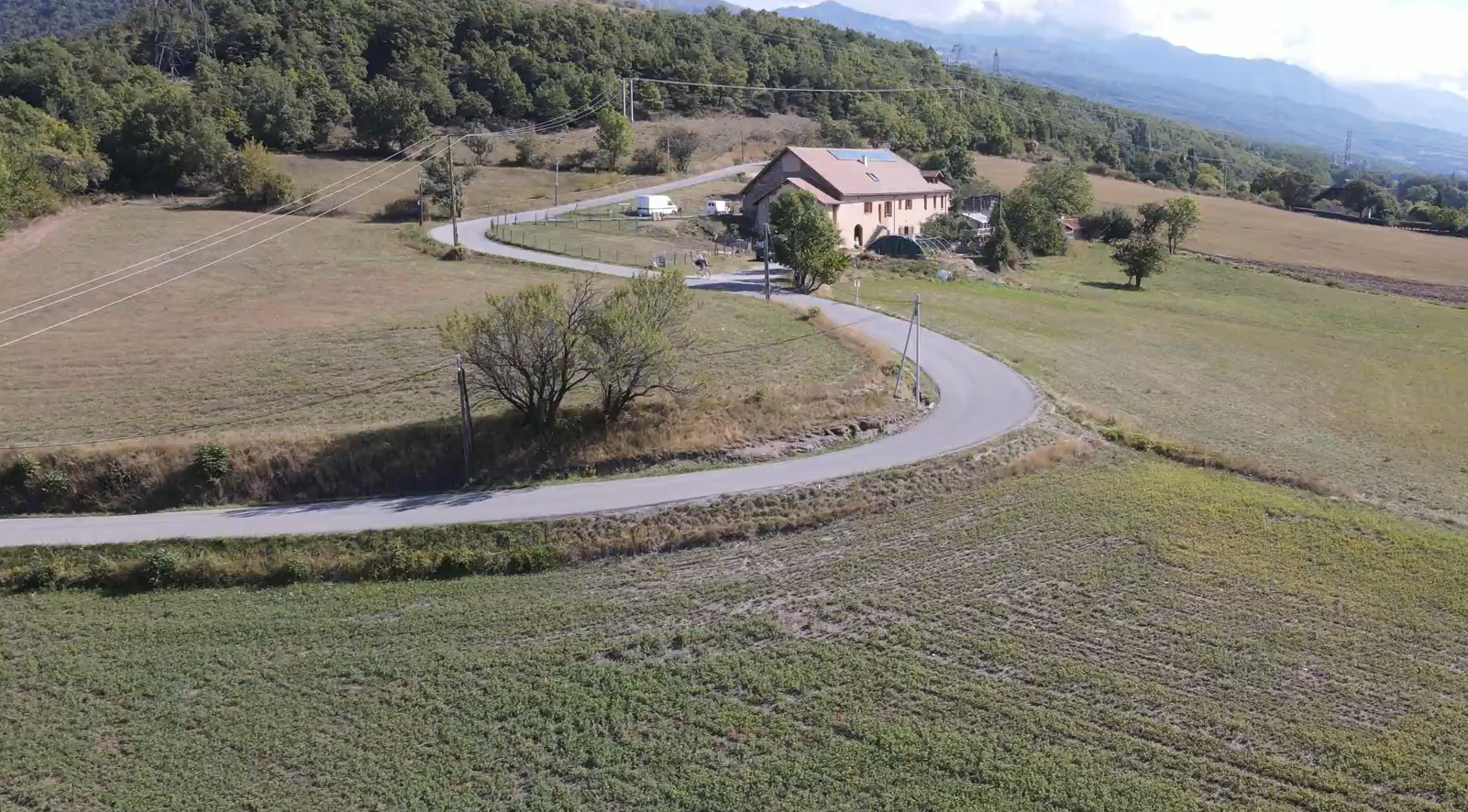
The road segment where the crash happened

On 14 July 2003, during the 9th stage of the 2003 Tour de France, Beloki was in second place overall (just 40 seconds behind Armstrong) and negotiating a turn at speed while descending from Cote de La Rochette, shortly after passing the Col de Manse, just 4 km from the stage finish at Gap. He lost control of his bicycle after he locked his rear brake and the rear tire came off the wheel on a patch of tarmac that was softened by the sun, sending his rear wheel skidding first in one direction and then the other. Beloki suffered a hard fall that broke his right femur in two places along with his elbow and his wrist. Armstrong was following immediately behind Beloki and, to avoid the fallen rider, headed off the road to go down the hill through the underbrush and across a small field. The crash effectively ended Beloki's career as a premier bicycle racer.

For the 2004 season, Beloki signed for the French team Brioches La Boulangère in preparation for the 2004 Tour de France. He was reported as being fully recovered from his injuries by early 2004, but it later transpired that those injuries were taking longer to heal than initially anticipated. By mid-April 2004, Beloki had yet to begin serious competition for the season. He started his home race, the Tour of the Basque Country, but failed to even complete the first stage before retiring in pain from his injuries. Citing incompatibility with the French team, he switched to the Spanish Saunier Duval–Prodir team for the remainder of the 2004 season. Beloki switched back to Manolo Saiz's team (now called Liberty Seguros–Würth) for 2005. Beloki completed the 2005 Tour de France and finished in 75th place. In the Vuelta a España, he also completed the race without being recognized, since he was only 39th overall.

In 2006 he was among those implicated in Operación Puerto and was withdrawn from the Tour de France. However, on 26 July he was cleared by Spanish officials of any wrongdoing. Payment records from Beloki as well as his race schedule were found in Eufemiano Fuentes' possession in his office; however, Beloki denies any claim he doped with Fuentes.

== Personal life ==
His son Markel Beloki is also a professional cyclist.

== Career achievements ==
=== Major results ===
1997
1st Overall Vuelta a Alava

1st Stage 1

2nd Time trial, National Road Championships
1998
5th Overall Tour de l'Avenir

1st Mountains classification

1999
3rd Road race, National Road Championships
4th Overall Critérium du Dauphiné Libéré
4th Overall Volta a Catalunya
2000
1st Overall Vuelta a Asturias

1st Stage 5

2nd Overall Tour de Romandie

1st Stage 3b (ITT)

3rd Overall Tour de France
6th Overall Vuelta a Aragón
2001
1st Overall Volta a Catalunya

1st Points classification
1st Stages 1 (TTT), 4 & 8 (ITT)

2nd Overall Euskal Bizikleta
2nd Overall Escalada a Montjuïc
3rd Overall Tour de France
4th Circuito de Getxo
2002
2nd Overall Tour de France
2nd Overall Escalada a Montjuïc

1st Stage 1a (ITT)

3rd Overall Vuelta a España

1st Stage 1 (TTT)
Held after Stages 1–4

3rd Overall Vuelta a Asturias
3rd LuK Challenge Chrono (with Igor González de Galdeano)
8th Overall Euskal Bizikleta

1st Stage 5

8th Giro di Lombardia
2003
1st Overall Clasica Alcobendas

1st Points classification
1st Stage 2b (ITT)

2nd Overall Euskal Bizikleta

1st Stage 5

=== Grand Tour general classification results timeline ===
| Grand Tour | 2000 | 2001 | 2002 | 2003 | 2004 | 2005 |
|---|---|---|---|---|---|---|
| Giro d'Italia | — | — | — | — | — | DNF |
| Tour de France | 3 | 3 | 2 | DNF | — | 75 |
| Vuelta a España | — | DNF | 3 | — | DNF | 40 |

Legend
| — | Did not compete |
| DNF | Did not finish |
