= Rafael Díaz Justo =

Spanish cyclist

Personal information
- Born: 8 November 1972 (age 53)

Cycling career
- Sport: Cycling
- Current team: scout for Visit Polti Malta
- Role: Rider

Rafael Díaz Justo (born 8 November 1972) is a Spanish racing cyclist. He rode in the 1999 Tour de France.
