= Félix García =

Spanish cyclist

Personal information
- Full name: Félix Manuel García Casas
- Born: December 29, 1968 (age 57) Madrid, Spain

Cycling career
- Sport: Cycling
- Current team: Retired
- Discipline: Road
- Role: Rider

Professional teams
- 1993–1995: Artiach–Filipinos–Chiquilin
- 1996–2001: Festina–Lotus
- 2002–2003: BigMat–Auber 93
- 2003: Bianchi

Félix Manuel García Casas (born December 29, 1968, in Madrid) is a Spanish former professional road cyclist.

== Career ==
He competed in four editions of the Tour de France, 10 of the Vuelta a España, and three of the Giro d'Italia. His sons Raúl and Carlos are also professional cyclists.

== Major results ==
1991
2nd Overall Circuito Montañés
1994
3rd Overall Escalada a Montjuïc
3rd Overall Vuelta a Asturias
1995
1st GP Miguel Indurain
1996
3rd Overall Tour of Chile

1st stage 1

1997
2nd Overall Tour of Chile

1st stage 1

2001
2nd Overall Tour de Romandie
3rd Trofeo Alcudia
3rd Overall Vuelta a Mallorca
2002
2nd Escalada a Montjuïc
8th Overall Vuelta a España
2003
3rd LuK Challenge Chrono

=== Grand Tour general classification results timeline ===
Grand Tour	1993	1994	1995	1996	1997	1998	1999	2000	2001	2002	2003
Vuelta a España	80	21	12	—	13	20	17	21	15	8	15
Giro d'Italia	—	—	—	17	12	37	—	—	—	—	—
Tour de France	—	—	—	48	—	—	—	14	37	—	23

Legend
DSQ	Disqualified
DNF	Did not finish
