= Aitor González =

Spanish cyclist

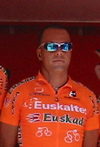

Personal information
- Full name: Aitor González Jiménez
- Nickname: Terminaitor
- Born: 27 February 1975 (age 51) Zumárraga, Spain

Cycling career
- Sport: Cycling
- Current team: Retired
- Discipline: Road
- Role: Rider
- Rider type: Climber

Professional teams
- 1998: Avianca–Telecom
- 1999–2002: Kelme–Costa Blanca
- 2003–2004: Fassa Bortolo
- 2005: Euskaltel–Euskadi

Major wins
- Grand Tours Tour de France 1 individual stage (2004) Giro d'Italia 3 individual stages (2002, 2003) Vuelta a España General classification (2002) 3 individual stages (2002) Stage races Tour de Suisse (2005)

Aitor González Jiménez (born 27 February 1975) is a Spanish former professional road bicycle racer, who rode professionally between 1998 and 2005, and was the winner of the 2002 Vuelta a España.

== Career ==
Born in Zumárraga, Gipuzkoa, González turned professional in 1998 with Avianca–Telecom. He won the 2002 Vuelta a España with Kelme–Costa Blanca after attacking his teammate leading the race; he also won three stages during the race. Following his Vuelta victory, he transferred to Fassa Bortolo, after a long controversy surrounding a previous contract signed with Acqua & Sapone–Cantina Tollo. He also won two stages at the 2002 Giro d'Italia, one at the 2003 Giro d'Italia and one at the 2004 Tour de France. He won the 2005 Tour de Suisse, before he retired in January 2006 after being tested positive for methyltestosterone metabolite twice during the 2005 season. He was also linked with the Operación Puerto doping case.

== Post-cycling ==
After retirement, González had several run-ins with the law. In 2007, he was arrested for driving under the influence of alcohol and cocaine. In 2008, a second arrest followed when he allegedly hired people to beat up a person who owed him money. In 2011, González was again arrested for taking part in a bank fraud. Lastly, in 2016, he was taken into custody a fourth time, for allegedly taking part in a robbery.

== Career achievements ==
=== Major results ===
2000
1st Stage 2 Volta ao Algarve
2nd Gran Premio de Llodio
5th Overall Tour du Limousin

1st Young rider classification
1st Stage 3

5th Subida a Urkiola
6th Overall Tour de Pologne
2001
1st Overall Vuelta a Murcia

1st Points classification
1st Stage 5 (ITT)

4th Overall Volta a Catalunya
4th Gran Premio de Llodio
9th Overall Critérium International
9th Overall Volta ao Algarve
2002
1st Overall Vuelta a España

1st Stages 8, 10 (ITT) & 21 (ITT)

6th Overall Giro d'Italia

1st Stages 8 & 19 (ITT)

6th Overall Critérium International
7th Time trial, UCI Road World Championships
8th Overall Tour de Romandie
2003
1st Giro della Provincia di Reggio Calabria
1st Stage 15 (ITT) Giro d'Italia
2004
1st Stage 14 Tour de France
6th Time trial, National Road Championships
2005
1st Overall Tour de Suisse

1st Stage 9

5th Overall Euskal Bizikleta

==== Grand Tour general classification results timeline ====
Grand Tour	2001	2002	2003	2004	2005
Giro d'Italia	—	6	19	—	DNF
Tour de France	DNF	—	DNF	45	—
Vuelta a España	—	1	DNF	DNF	DNF

Legend
—	Did not compete
DNF	Did not finish

== See also ==
- List of riders with stage wins at all three cycling Grand Tours
- List of doping cases in cycling
- List of sportspeople sanctioned for doping offences
