= Fabian Jeker =

Swiss cyclist

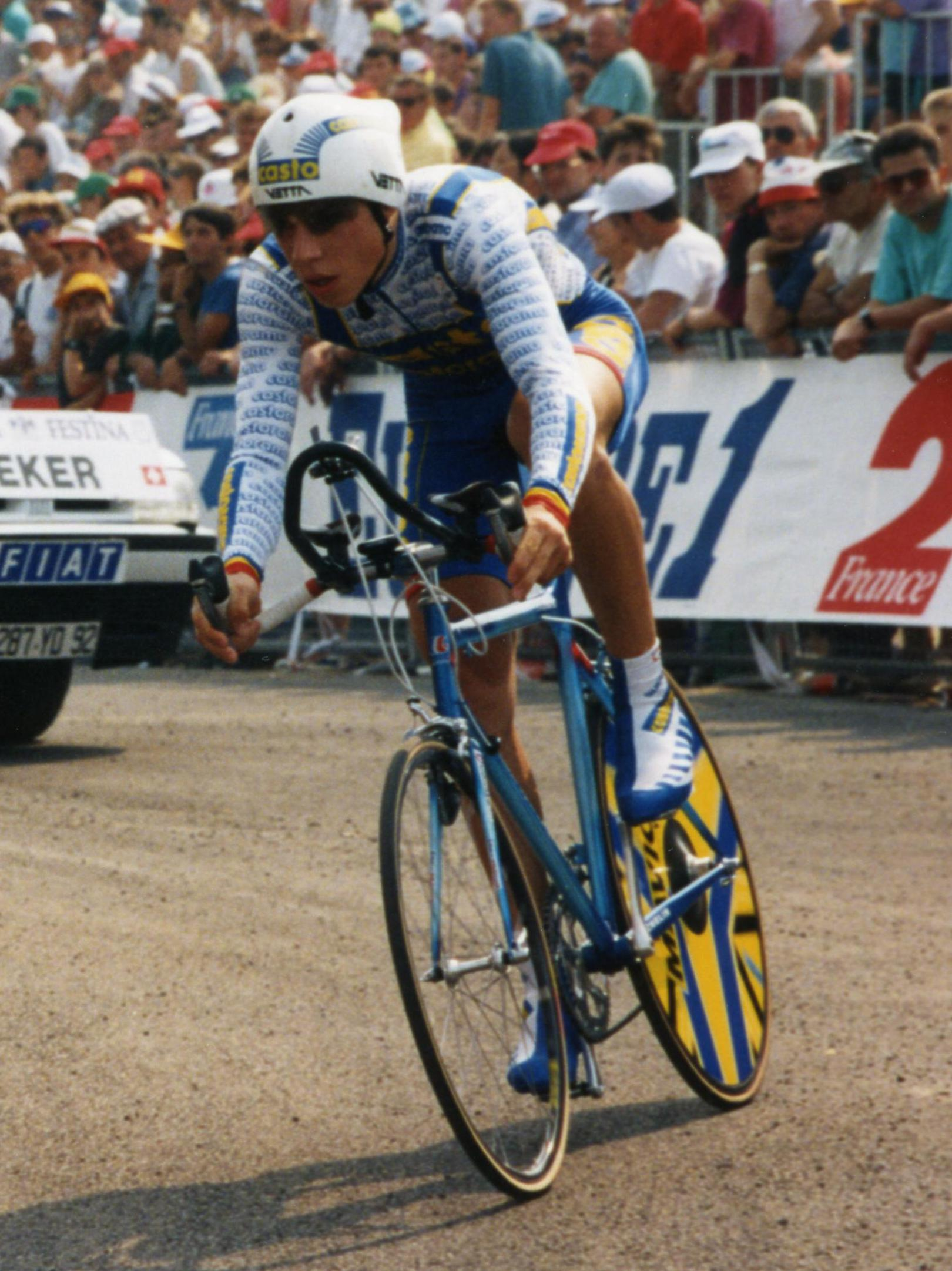
- Jeker at the 1993 Tour de France

Personal information
- Full name: Fabian Jeker
- Born: 28 November 1968 (age 57) Füllinsdorf, Switzerland

Cycling career
- Sport: Cycling
- Current team: Retired
- Discipline: Road
- Role: Rider

Professional teams
- 1991–1992: Helvetia
- 1993–1994: Castorama
- 1995–2000: Festina
- 2001–2003: Milaneza–MSS
- 2004–2005: Saunier Duval–Prodir

Fabian Jeker (born 28 November 1968 in Füllinsdorf, Switzerland) is a Swiss former road bicycle racer.

== Palmarès ==
1992
1st, Overall and Stage 3, Volta a Galicia
1995
1st, Stage 7, Critérium du Dauphiné Libéré
1996
1st, Escalada a Montjuïc
1998
1st, Escalada a Montjuïc
2000
1st, Escalada a Montjuïc
2001
1st, Overall, Stages 8 and 14, Volta a Portugal
1st, Overall, Volta a la Comunitat Valenciana
1st, Stage 4, Grande Premio do Minho
2002
1st, Overall, Stages 1 and 5, Grande Premio do Minho
1st, Stage 3, Volta ao Alentejo
2003
1st, Overall and Stage 4, Vuelta a Asturias
1st, Overall and Stages 3 and 4b, Troféu Joaquim Agostinho
1st, Stage 7, Paris–Nice
2004
Tour de Romandie

1st, Stage 4
2nd, Overall

2nd, Overall, Tour de Suisse
