= ONCE (cycling team) =

Spanish cycling team

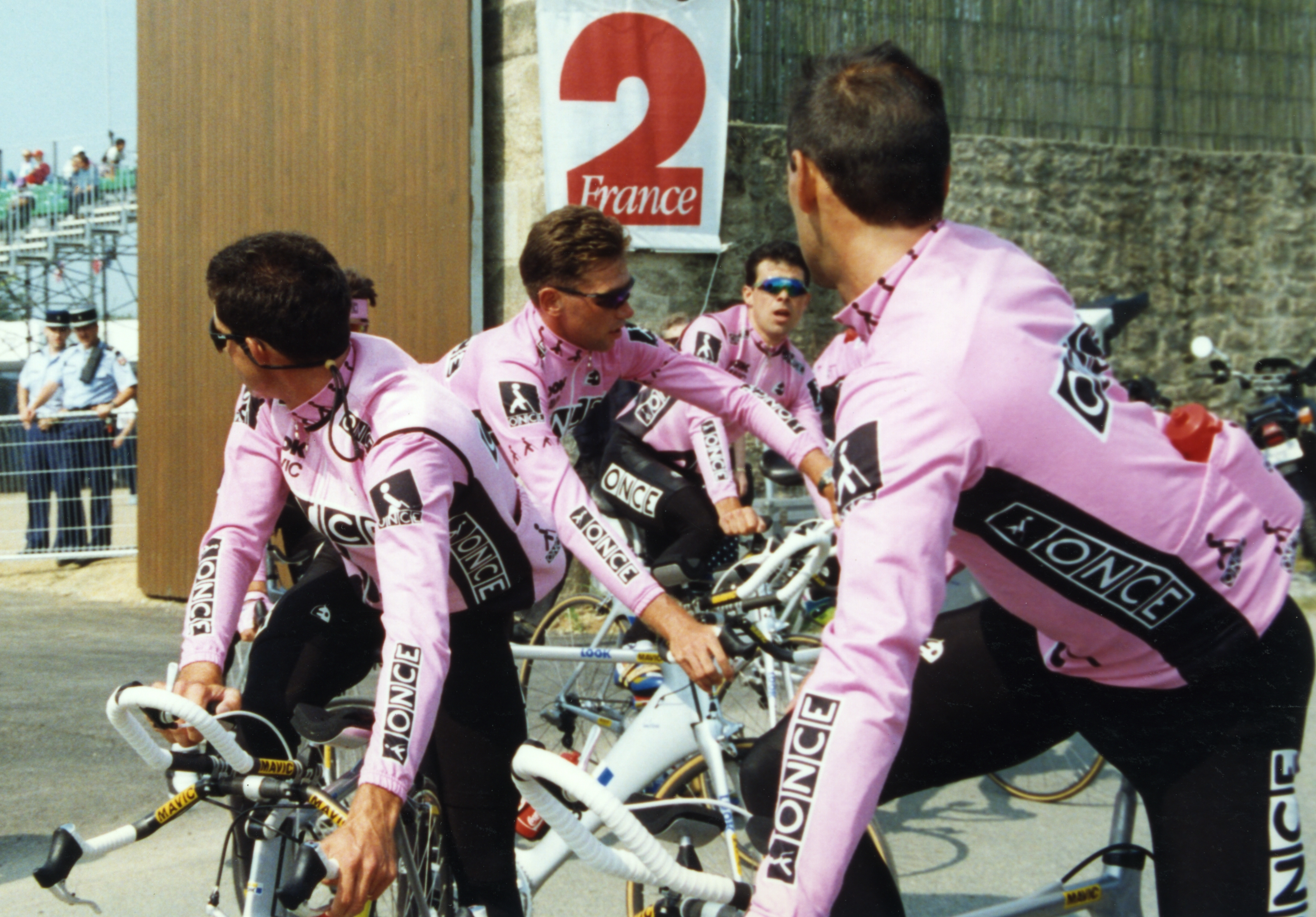
- The team at the 1993 Tour de France

Team information
- UCI code: ONC
- Registered: Spain
- Founded: 1989
- Disbanded: 2006
- Discipline: Road
- Status: ProTour

Key personnel
- General manager: Manolo Saiz

Team name history
- 1989–1998 1999–2000 2001–2003 2004 2005–2006 2006 2006 2006: ONCE; ONCE–Deutsche Bank; ONCE–Eroski; Liberty Seguros; Liberty Seguros–Würth; Würth Team; Astana–Würth Team; Astana Team

ONCE cycling team, (UCI team code: ONC) also known as Liberty Seguros, Liberty Seguros–Würth and in succession in its final year, Astana–Würth and Astana was a Spanish cycling team. It competed in the UCI ProTour circuit.

On 25 May 2006, Liberty Mutual ("seguros" means "insurance" in Spanish) pulled out of primary sponsorship due to a doping scandal involving the directeur sportif, Manolo Saiz. On 2 June 2006, the team acquired a primary sponsor named Astana, after the capital of Kazakhstan. Würth was co-sponsor until 3 July 2006, withdrawing at the end of the 2006 Tour de France, in which Astana–Würth didn't compete. At the end of the season, Astana also withdrew due to the non-participation in the Tour. On 16 December 2006, the UCI withdrew the ProTour licence of Saiz's company, Active Bay.

Some riders and staff formed the Kazakhstan-based Astana Team.

== History ==
=== ONCE ===
The team traces its lineage to the Spanish team, ONCE, sponsored by a lottery for the blind. Manolo Saiz, one of few managers who was not a former rider, introduced more professional management, closer supervision in coaching, equipment and training. In the 2003 Vuelta he was banned from the race after insulting a motorcycle-mounted TV cameraman, his comments broadcast live.

ONCE team was known for its association with Laurent Jalabert and Alex Zülle in the 1990s, dominating spring races such as Paris–Nice, La Flèche Wallonne and the Tour de Romandie. The team won the Vuelta a España in 1995, 1996 and 1997. It dominated the 1995 Vuelta with Jalabert winning overall, the points competition and the mountains. It was also best team, with Johan Bruyneel third. ONCE team in the Tour de France had stage wins from Jalabert and domination in the team time trial.

Zülle won the Vuelta in 1996 and 1997 but left the team in 1998. The team signed the 1998 winner and individual time trial specialist, Abraham Olano, who challenged in the 1999 Vuelta but never won a second Grand Tour. Joseba Beloki became leader and challenged Armstrong in the 2002 and 2003 Tours.

Isidro Nozal led the 2003 Vuelta until Roberto Heras took the lead on the penultimate day. ONCE's sponsorship was so successful that brand penetration was 100% in Spain, meaning every Spaniard surveyed knew ONCE. At the end of 2003 ONCE stopped sponsorship. Saiz obtained a new sponsor, Liberty Mutual. Most of the riders stayed, including Isidro Nozal and Igor González de Galdeano. Saiz signed Heras; he did not perform well at the 2004 Tour de France but won the 2004 Vuelta after a battle with Santiago Pérez.

=== Liberty Seguros ===
In the 2005 the team started with wins in the Tour Down Under through Alberto Contador and Luis León Sánchez. In the 2005 Tour the team won the stage to Mende courtesy of Marcos Antonio Serrano, reminiscent of Laurent Jalabert's win in 1995.

Alexander Vinokourov joined in 2006 for three seasons to challenge for top finish in the Tour de France. Fellow Kazakhstan riders Andrei Kashechkin, formerly of Crédit Agricole, and Sergei Yakovlev also joined.

On 25 November, Roberto Heras was fired after a urine sample from the 2005 Vuelta a España, which he had won, tested positive for the blood-boosting drug EPO. Heras was stripped of what would have been a record-breaking fourth win and banned for two years.

=== Sponsorship Changes and 2006 Season ===
On 23 May 2006, Saiz was arrested in relation to the Operación Puerto blood doping scandal. Liberty Mutual retracted sponsorship on 25 May 2006, promising only to finance current obligations. On 2 June 2006, the team acquired a new primary sponsor – named Astana, the capital of Kazakhstan – for three years, with an option to extend to six. It was headed by a consortium of five Kazakh companies. Long before Saiz was ensnared in Operación Puerto, the team had been notorious for doping dating back to its days as ONCE, and was considered one of the dirtiest teams in the European peloton.

On June 30, 2006, Astana-Würth was excluded from the 2006 Tour de France after five riders were implicated in a doping scandal, leaving Vinokourov with three remaining teammates, below the minimum six for the Tour. Würth stopped its commitment on 3 of July.

On 26 July 2006, the five riders excluded from the Tour were cleared by Spanish officials, and the team returned to competition at the Tour of Germany in August, Assan Bazayev winning the first stage. One rider, Joseba Beloki, would never ride a professional race again.

At the end of 2006, Saiz listed Astana as his team's backer. Astana also claimed to have withdrawn support due to non-participation in the Tour. On 16 December 2006, the UCI withdrew the ProTour license of Saiz's Active Bay company.

== Major victories ==
1989
Overall Volta a la Comunitat Valenciana, Pello Ruiz Cabestany

Stage 5b, Pello Ruiz Cabestany

Stage 1 Vuelta al País Vasco, Johnny Weltz
Denmark National Road Race Championships, Johnny Weltz
Stage 10 Vuelta a España, Herminio Díaz Zabala
Stage 5 Vuelta a Burgos, Pedro Muñoz Machín Rodríguez

1990
Overall Vuelta a Andalucia, Eduardo Chozas

Mountains classification, Miguel Ángel Martínez
Stage 4, Eduardo Chozas
Stage 6, Kenneth Weltz

Stage 3b (TTT), Celestino Prieto, Pedro Luis Díaz Zabala & Eduardo Chozas
Stages 1 & 20 Vuelta a España, Pello Ruiz Cabestany
Stage 3 Giro d'Italia, Eduardo Chozas
Stage 13 Tour de France, Eduardo Chozas
Stage 14 Tour de France, Marino Lejarreta
Overall Escalada a Montjuich, Marino Lejarreta

Stage 1b, Marino Lejarreta

Overall Vuelta a Burgos, Marino Lejarreta

Stages 2 & 4, Marino Lejarreta

Clásica a los Puertos de Guadarrama, Stephen Hodge

1991
Overall Volta a la Comunitat Valenciana, Melchor Mauri

Stage 1, José Luis Villanueva
Stages 3 & 6, Melchor Mauri

Overall Vuelta a Murcia, José Luis Villanueva

Stage 4a, Eduardo Chozas

Overall Vuelta a España, Melchor Mauri

Stages 1, 8 & 19, Melchor Mauri
Stage 2b (TTT)

Stage 3 Tour de Romandie, Stephen Hodge
Stage 5 Giro d'Italia, Marino Lejarreta
Stage 13 Giro d'Italia, Eduardo Chozas
Biel-Bienne–Magglingen, Stephen Hodge

1992
Overall Vuelta a Andalucia, Miguel Ángel Martínez
Overall Volta a la Comunitat Valenciana, Melchor Mauri

Stage 5b, Melchor Mauri

Stage 4 Vuelta a Murcia, Melchor Mauri
Stage 1 Critérium International, Stephen Hodge
Stage 12 Vuelta a España, Johan Bruyneel
Stages 2, 5a & 7 Volta a Catalunya, Laurent Jalabert
Stage 4 Volta a Catalunya, Alex Zülle
Points classification Tour de France, Laurent Jalabert

Stage 6, Laurent Jalabert

Biel-Bienne–Magglingen, Stephen Hodge
Stage 1 Vuelta Ciclista a la Rioja, Melchor Mauri
Stage 3 Vuelta Ciclista a la Rioja, Kenneth Weltz
Decazeville Criterium, Philippe Louviot
Coppa Placci, Johan Bruyneel
Grand Prix des Nations, Johan Bruyneel
Overall Escalada a Montjuich, Alex Zülle

Stage 1a, Alex Zülle

Subida a Txitxarro, Marino Lejarreta

1993
Stage 1 Vuelta a Andalucia, Juan Llaneras
Trofeo Luis Puig, Laurent Jalabert
Stage 2 Volta a la Comunitat Valenciana, Erik Breukink
Stage 6 Volta a la Comunitat Valenciana, Laurent Jalabert
Overall Paris–Nice, Alex Zülle

Stages 1 & 8b, Alex Zülle
Stage 3 (TTT)
Stage 8a, Laurent Jalabert

Overall Critérium International, Erik Breukink

Stage 3, Erik Breukink

Stages 1, 6 & 21 Vuelta a España, Alex Zülle
Stages 3 & 7 Vuelta a España, Laurent Jalabert
Clásica Internacional de Alcobendas y Villalba, Laurent Jalabert
Overall Critérium du Dauphiné, Laurent Dufaux

Stage 5, Laurent Dufaux

Stage 6 Tour de France, Johan Bruyneel
Trofeo Comunidad Foral de Navarra, Johnny Weltz
Geraardsbergen, Criterium, Johan Bruyneel
Stages 3 & 4 Volta a Catalunya, Laurent Jalabert
Aalsmeer Criterium, Erik Breukink
Overall Vuelta Ciclista a la Rioja, Laurent Jalabert

Stage 1, Kiko García
Stages 2 & 3, Laurent Jalabert

1994
Stage 2 Vuelta a Murcia, Herminio Díaz Zabala
Points classification Vuelta a España, Laurent Jalabert

Stages 2, 3, 5, 12, 13, 16 & 20, Laurent Jalabert

Classique des Alpes, Oliviero Rincón
Overall Critérium du Dauphiné, Laurent Dufaux
Stage 5 GP du Midi-Libre, Laurent Jalabert
Stage 3 Vuelta a los Valles Mineros, Santos Hernández
Stage 1 Volta a Catalunya, Alex Zülle
Stage 5 Volta a Catalunya, Laurent Jalabert
Stage 3 Vuelta Ciclista a la Rioja, Johan Bruyneel
Paris–Tours U23, Nicolas Jalabert

1995
Overall Bay Cycling Classic, Neil Stephens

Stages 1, 3 & 4, Neil Stephens

Australia National Road Race Championships, Neil Stephens
Overall Summer Tour

Stages 1, 4, 5 & 6, Neil Stephens

Overall Vuelta a Mallorca, Alex Zülle

Stage 2, Laurent Jalabert

Overall Volta a la Comunitat Valenciana, Alex Zülle

Stage 2a, Laurent Jalabert
Stage 2b, Alex Zülle

Overall Paris–Nice, Laurent Jalabert

Stage 2, Laurent Jalabert

Milan–San Remo, Laurent Jalabert
Stage 5b Setmana Catalana de Ciclismo, Alex Zülle
Overall Critérium International, Laurent Jalabert

Stages 1 & 2, Laurent Jalabert

Overall Vuelta al País Vasco, Alex Zülle

Stages 3 & 5b, Alex Zülle

Klasika Primavera, Laurent Jalabert
La Flèche Wallonne, Laurent Jalabert
Calais Criterium, Laurent Jalabert
Stage 3 GP du Midi-Libre, Laurent Jalabert
Stage 14 Giro d'Italia, Oliviero Rincón
Stage 5 GP du Midi-Libre, Johan Bruyneel
Stage 4 part b Euskal Bizikleta, Alex Zülle
Stages 1 & 6 Tour de Suisse, Alex Zülle
Overall Volta a Catalunya, Laurent Jalabert

Stages 1 & 7, Laurent Jalabert
Stage 6, Melchor Mauri

Spain National Time Trial Championships, Melchor Mauri
Points classification Tour de France, Laurent Jalabert

Stage 7, Johan Bruyneel
Stage 9, Alex Zülle
Stage 12, Laurent Jalabert

Aalst Criterium, Johan Bruyneel
Profronde Stiphout, Erik Breukink
Villafranca de Ordizia, Neil Stephens
Ronde des Korrigans, Laurent Jalabert
Bol d'or des Monédières, Laurent Jalabert
Château-Chinon Criterium, Laurent Jalabert
Stage 3 Volta a Galicia, Laurent Jalabert
Circuit de l'Aulne, Laurent Jalabert
Netherlands National Time Trial Championships, Erik Breukink
Overall Vuelta a España

Points classification, Laurent Jalabert
Mountains classification, Laurent Jalabert
Stages 3, 5, 8, 15 & 17, Laurent Jalabert
Stage 16, Alex Zülle

Toulouse criterium, Laurent Jalabert
Overall Alquerias del Niño Perdido, Omnium, Kiko García
Overall Playa de Aro Omnium, Juan Llaneras

Stage 1a, Juan Llaneras

Overall L'Hospitalet de Llobregat Criterium, Melchor Mauri
Overall Leganés, Laurent Jalabert
Overall Alcobendas, Laurent Jalabert
Overall UCI Road Ranking, Laurent Jalabert

1996
Stage 4 Bay Cycling Classic, Patrick Jonker
Classic Haribo, Laurent Jalabert
Overall Vuelta a Andalucia, Neil Stephens
Overall Volta a la Comunitat Valenciana, Laurent Jalabert

Stage 1, Laurent Jalabert
Stage 5b Melchor Mauri

Overall Vuelta a Murcia, Melchor Mauri

Stage 5, Melchor Mauri

Overall Paris–Nice, Laurent Jalabert

Stages 3 & 4

Overall Setmana Catalana de Ciclismo, Alex Zülle

Stages 3 & 5b

Trofeo Comunidad Foral de Navarra, Alex Zülle
Stage 1 Vuelta al País Vasco, Laurent Jalabert
Stage 5a Vuelta al País Vasco, Neil Stephens
Overall Vuelta a Aragón, Melchor Mauri

Stage 2, Aitor Garmendia
Stage 4b, Melchor Mauri

Stage 3 Vuelta a Asturias, David Etxebarria
Overall GP du Midi-Libre, Laurent Jalabert

Stages 2 & 5, Laurent Jalabert

Classique des Alpes, Laurent Jalabert
Overall Vuelta Ciclista a la Rioja, Roberto Sierra
Overall Volta a Catalunya, Alex Zülle

Prologue, Stages 3 & 6, Alex Zülle
Stage 4, Patrick Jonker

Overall Route du Sud, Laurent Jalabert
Prologue Tour de France, Alex Zülle
GP Llodio, David Etxebarria
Overall Tour de l'Avenir, David Etxebarria
Overall Vuelta a España, Alex Zülle

Points classification, Laurent Jalabert
Stages 3 & 13, Laurent Jalabert
Stage 15, Alex Zülle
Stage 17, Oliviero Rincón

UCI Road World Championships, Time Trial, Alex Zülle
UCI Road Ranking, Laurent Jalabert

1997
Trofeo Soller, Laurent Jalabert
Overall Challenge Mallorca, Laurent Jalabert
Overall Paris–Nice, Laurent Jalabert

Stages 1 & 6, Laurent Jalabert

Overall Critérium International, Marcelino García

Stage 2, Marcelino García
Stage 3, Aitor Garmendia

Trofeo Comunidad Foral de Navarra, Mikel Zarrabeitia
Vuelta al País Vasco, Alex Zülle

Stages 2 & 4, Laurent Jalabert
Stage 5b, Alex Zülle

Circuit Cycliste Sarthe, Melchor Mauri

Stage 4, Melchor Mauri

Klasika Primavera, Mikel Zarrabeitia
La Flèche Wallonne, Laurent Jalabert
Vuelta a Aragón, Aitor Garmendia

Stage 3, Mikel Zarrabeitia
Stage 4b, Aitor Garmendia

Volta ao Alentejo, Aitor Garmendia

Stage 5, Aitor Garmendia

Stage 3 Vuelta a los Valles Mineros, David Etxebarria
Stage 6 Tour de Suisse, David Etxebarria
Callac Criterium, Laurent Jalabert
Stage 1 Vuelta Castilla y León, Laurent Jalabert
Overall Volta a Galicia, Aitor Garmendia

Stage 3b, Aitor Garmendia

Overall Vuelta a Burgos, Laurent Jalabert

Stage 2, Laurent Jalabert

Overall Vuelta a España, Alex Zülle

Points classification, Laurent Jalabert
Stages 6 & 20, Laurent Jalabert
Stage 9, Melchor Mauri
Stage 21, Alex Zülle

1997 UCI Road World Championships, Time Trial, Laurent Jalabert
Milano–Torino, Laurent Jalabert
Giro di Lombardia, Laurent Jalabert
Overall Escalada a Montjuich, Laurent Jalabert

Stages 1a & 1b, Laurent Jalabert

UCI Road Ranking, Laurent Jalabert

1998
Overall Vuelta a Andalucia, Marcelino García

Stage 3, Marcelino García

Tour du Haut-Var, Laurent Jalabert
Stage 2 Paris–Nice, David Etxebarria
Stage 1 Vuelta al País Vasco, Laurent Jalabert
Overall Circuit Cycliste Sarthe, Melchor Mauri

Stage 4, Melchor Mauri

Overall Vuelta al País Vasco, Iñigo Cuesta

Stage 5b, Laurent Jalabert

Overall Volta ao Alentejo, Melchor Mauri

Stage 5, Melchor Mauri

Overall Vuelta a Asturias, Laurent Jalabert

Stages 1 & 6, Laurent Jalabert

GP du Midi-Libre, Melchor Mauri
Stages 3 & 4a Euskal Bizikleta, Laurent Jalabert
Classique des Alpes, Laurent Jalabert
Prologue, Stages 3 & 8, Tour de Suisse, Laurent Jalabert
France National Road Championships, Road Race, Laurent Jalabert
Stage 3 Volta a Galicia, Rafael Díaz Justo
Subida a Txitxarro, Alberto Leanizbarrutia
L'Hospitalet de Llobregat Criterium, Melchor Mauri

1999
Overall Setmana Catalana de Ciclismo, Laurent Jalabert

Stage 5b, Laurent Jalabert

Overall Vuelta al País Vasco, Laurent Jalabert

Stages 1 & 5b, Laurent Jalabert

Overall Tour de Romandie, Laurent Jalabert

Prologue, Stages 2 & 3b, Laurent Jalabert

Stage 2b Vuelta a Asturias, Abraham Olano
Overall Euskal Bizikleta, David Etxebarria

Stage 4b, Abraham Olano

Points classification Giro d'Italia, Laurent Jalabert

Stages 4 & 9, Laurent Jalabert
Stage 16, Laurent Jalabert

Prologue Tour de Suisse, Laurent Jalabert
Spain National Road Championships, Time Trial, Santos González
Stages 12 & 16 Tour de France, David Etxebarria
Clasica a los Puertos, Miguel Ángel Martín
Trofeo Luis Ocana, José Luis Rebollo
Overall Volta a Galicia, Marcos Serrano

Stage 5, Marcos Serrano

Overall Vuelta a Burgos, Abraham Olano

Stage 1, Abraham Olano
Stage 2, Miguel Ángel Martín

Stage 6 Vuelta a España, Abraham Olano
UCI Road Ranking, Laurent Jalabert

2000
Overall Tour Méditerranéen, Laurent Jalabert

Stage 5, Laurent Jalabert

Overall Vuelta a Andalucia, Miguel Ángel Peña

Stage 3, Miguel Ángel Peña

Overall Volta a la Comunitat Valenciana, Abraham Olano

Stage 5b, Abraham Olano

Overall Vuelta a Murcia, David Cañada

Stages 4 & 5, David Cañada

Overall Tirreno–Adriatico, Abraham Olano

Stage 3, Laurent Jalabert
Stage 5, Abraham Olano

Overall Critérium International, Abraham Olano

Stage 4 Vuelta al País Vasco, Laurent Jalabert

Overall Circuit Cycliste Sarthe, David Cañada

Stage 4, David Cañada

Stage 2 Euskal Bizikleta, David Etxebarria
Stage 6 Critérium du Dauphiné, Iñigo Cuesta
Stage 7 Critérium du Dauphiné Laurent Jalabert
Stage 1 (TTT) Volta a Catalunya, Santos González
Spain National Road Championships, Time Trial, José Iván Gutiérrez
Stage 1 Vuelta Castilla y León, Santos González
Stage 3 Volta a Galicia, David Etxebarria
Mountains classification Vuelta a España, Carlos Sastre

Stage 9, Abraham Olano
Stage 21, Santos González

2001
Stage 3 Volta ao Algarve, José Azevedo
Overall GP Mosqueteiros - Rota do Marquês, Igor González De Galdeano

Stage 4, Igor González De Galdeano

Stage 2a (TTT) GP Internacional MR Cortez-Mitsubishi
Overall Clásica Internacional de Alcobendas y Villalba, Abraham Olano

Stage 3, Jan Hruška

Stage 3 Vuelta a Asturias, Igor González De Galdeano
Stage 1 Euskal Bizikleta, Mikel Zarrabeitia
Portugal National Road Championships, Time Trial, José Azevedo
Overall Volta a Catalunya, Joseba Beloki

Stage 1 (TTT)
Stage 8, Joseba Beloki

Spain National Road Championships, Time Trial, Santos González
Spain National Road Championships, Road Race, José Iván Gutiérrez
Overall Vuelta Castilla y León, Marcos Serrano
Stage 3 Vuelta a Burgos, Carlos Sastre
Stage 9 Vuelta a España, Igor González De Galdeano
Overall GP CTT Correios de Portugal, José Iván Gutiérrez
Overall Escalada a Montjuich, Joaquim Rodríguez

Stage 1a, Joaquim Rodríguez

2002
Stage 5 Volta ao Algarve, Jan Hruška
Stage 5 Vuelta a Murcia, René Andrle
Stage 3 Clásica Internacional de Alcobendas y Villalba, Isidro Nozal
Stage 3 GP du Midi-Libre, Igor González De Galdeano
Stage 4b Euskal Bizikleta, Mikel Zarrabeitia
Overall Deutschland Tour, Igor González De Galdeano
Overall Euskal Bizikleta, Mikel Zarrabeitia

Stage 5, Joseba Beloki

Spain National Road Championships, Time Trial, Igor González De Galdeano
Stage 4 Tour de France, Abraham Olano
Villafranca de Ordizia, Mikel Zarrabeitia
Stage 3 (TTT) Vuelta a Burgos, David Arroyo
Stage 1 (TTT) Vuelta a España, Jörg Jaksche
Stage 8 Tour de l'Avenir, Xavier Florencio
Overall Escalada a Montjuich, Joseba Beloki

Stage 1a, Joseba Beloki

2003
Stage 5 Tour Down Under, Giampaolo Caruso
Trofeo Manacor, Allan Davis
Stage 6 Paris–Nice, Joaquim Rodríguez
Stage 2 Vuelta al País Vasco, Ángel Vicioso
Stage 4 Circuit Cycliste Sarthe, Allan Davis
Stage 3 Vuelta Ciclista a la Rioja, Jan Hruška
Overall Clásica Internacional de Alcobendas y Villalba, Joseba Beloki

Stage 3, Joseba Beloki

Stage 5 Deutschland Tour, José Azevedo
Stage 5 Euskal Bizikleta, Joseba Beloki
Stage 7 Volta a Catalunya, Ángel Vicioso
Stage 1 Vuelta a España, Igor González De Galdeano
Stage 6 Vuelta a España, Isidro Nozal
Stage 8 Tour de Pologne, Alberto Contador
Stage 8 Vuelta a España, Joaquim Rodríguez
Stage 13 Vuelta a España, Isidro Nozal
Noosa Criterium, Allan Davis

2004
Trofeo Palma de Mallorca, Allan Davis
Trofeo Alcudia, Allan Davis
Terezín Criterium, René Andrle
Overall Vuelta Castilla y León, Koldo Gil
Stage 3 Clásica Internacional de Alcobendas y Villalba, Luis León Sánchez
Stage 1 Vuelta a Asturias, Luis León Sánchez
Stage 3 Vuelta a Asturias, Carlos Barredo
Stage 5 Deutschland Tour, Allan Davis
Overall Euskal Bizikleta, Roberto Heras

Stages 3 & 4b, Ángel Vicioso

Points classification Tour de Pologne, Allan Davis

Stage 3, Allan Davis

Overall Vuelta a España, Roberto Heras

Combination classification, Roberto Heras
Stage 12, Roberto Heras

Milano–Torino, Marcos Serrano
Giro del Piemonte, Allan Davis
South Bank GP, Allan Davis

2005
Australia National Road Championships, Criterium, Allan Davis
Overall Tour Down Under, Luis León Sánchez

Stage 3, Luis León Sánchez
Stage 5, Alberto Contador

Overall Vuelta a Murcia, Koldo Gil
Stages 3 & 5, Allan Davis
Overall Setmana Catalana de Ciclismo, Alberto Contador

Stage 3, Alberto Contador

Stage 5b Vuelta al País Vasco, Alberto Contador
Klasika Primavera, David Etxebarria
Stage 5 Vuelta a Aragón, Allan Davis
Stage 4 Tour de Romandie, Alberto Contador
Stage 3 Clásica Internacional de Alcobendas y Villalba, Luis León Sánchez
Stage 7 Giro d'Italia, Koldo Gil
Stages 1 & 4a Euskal Bizikleta, Ángel Vicioso
Stage 18 Tour de France, Marcos Serrano
Points classification Benelux Tour, Allan Davis

Stage 3, Allan Davis

Stages 6 & 15 Vuelta a España, Roberto Heras
Stage 4 Tour de l'Avenir, Koen De Kort
G.P. Jatorena, Roberto Heras

2006
Stages 2 & 5 Tour Down Under, Allan Davis
Stage 3 Tour Down Under, Carlos Barredo
Stage 6 Paris–Nice, Andrey Kashechkin
Mountains classification Tirreno–Adriatico, José Joaquín Rojas
Overall Vuelta Castilla y León, Alexandre Vinokourov

Stage 5, Alexandre Vinokourov

Stage 3 Tour de Romandie, Alberto Contador
Stage 4 Tour de Suisse, Ángel Vicioso
Kazakhstan National Road Championships, Road Race, Andrey Kashechkin
Stage 8 Tour de Suisse, Alberto Contador
Stage 1 Deutschland Tour, Assan Bazayev
Stage 1 Vuelta a Burgos, Aaron Kemps
Overall Vuelta a España, Alexandre Vinokourov

Stages 8, 9 & 20, Alexandre Vinokourov
Stage 10, Sérgio Paulinho
Stage 18, Andrey Kashechkin

Noosa Criterium, Allan Davis

== Notable riders ==
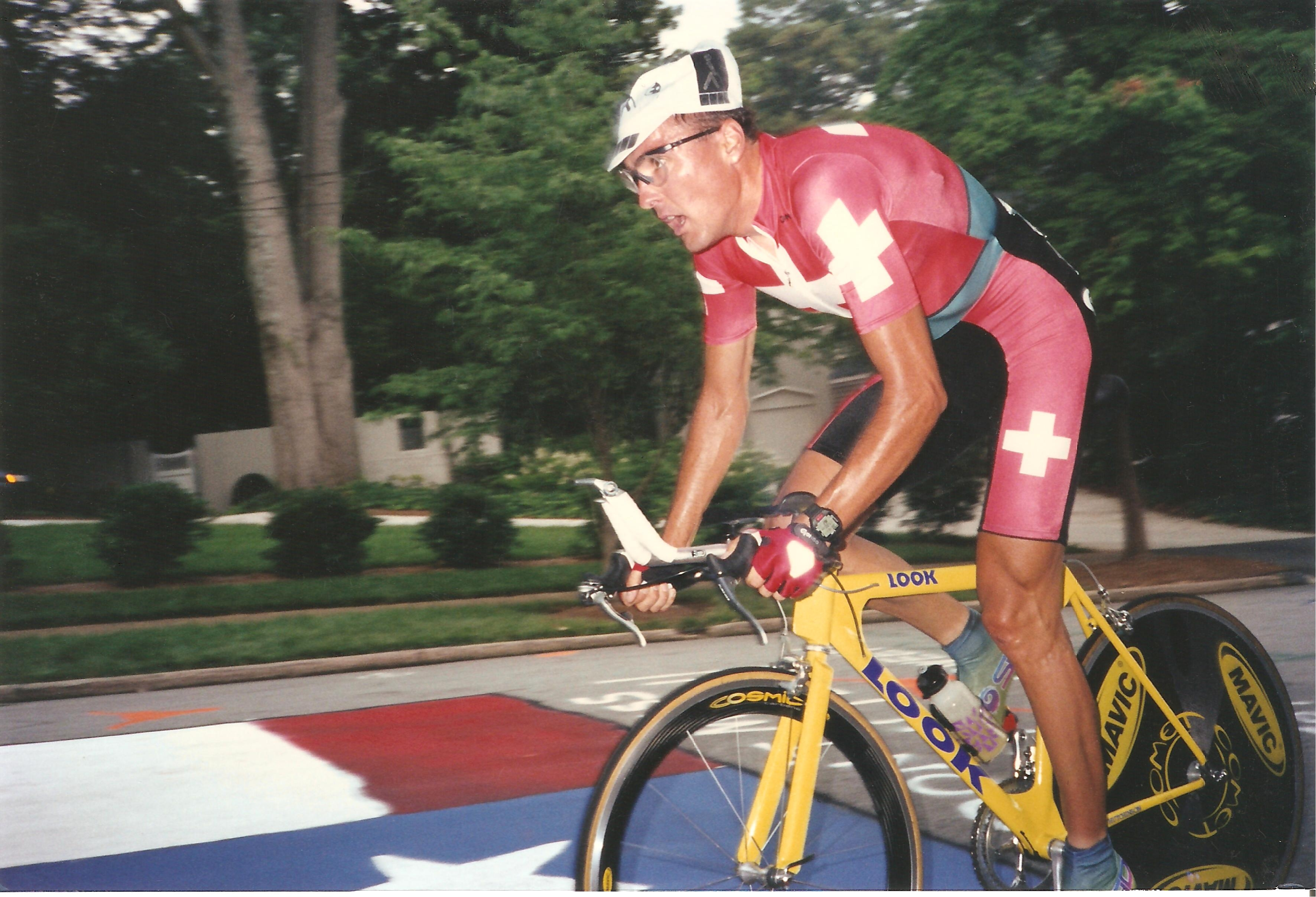
Alex Zülle

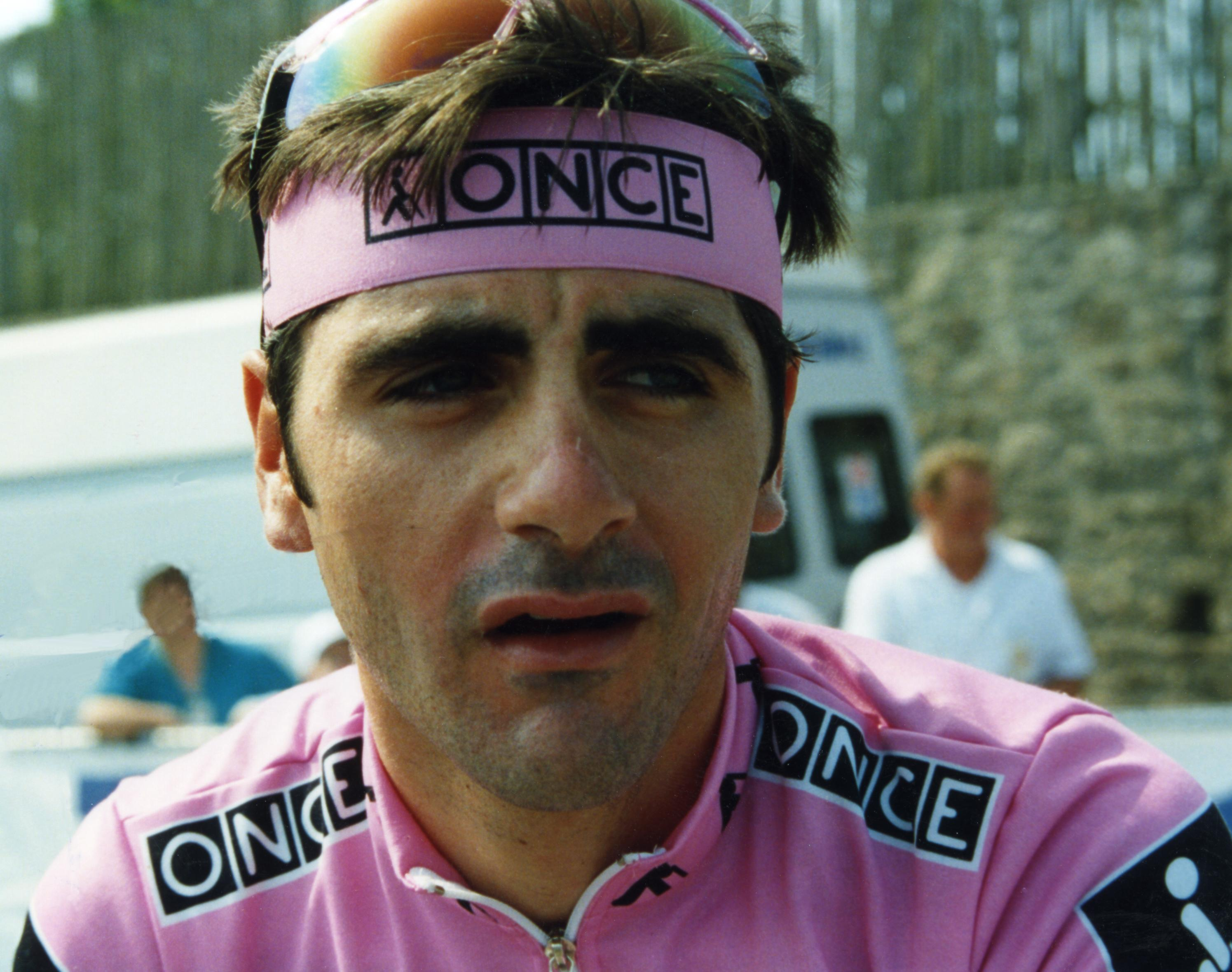
Laurent Jalabert

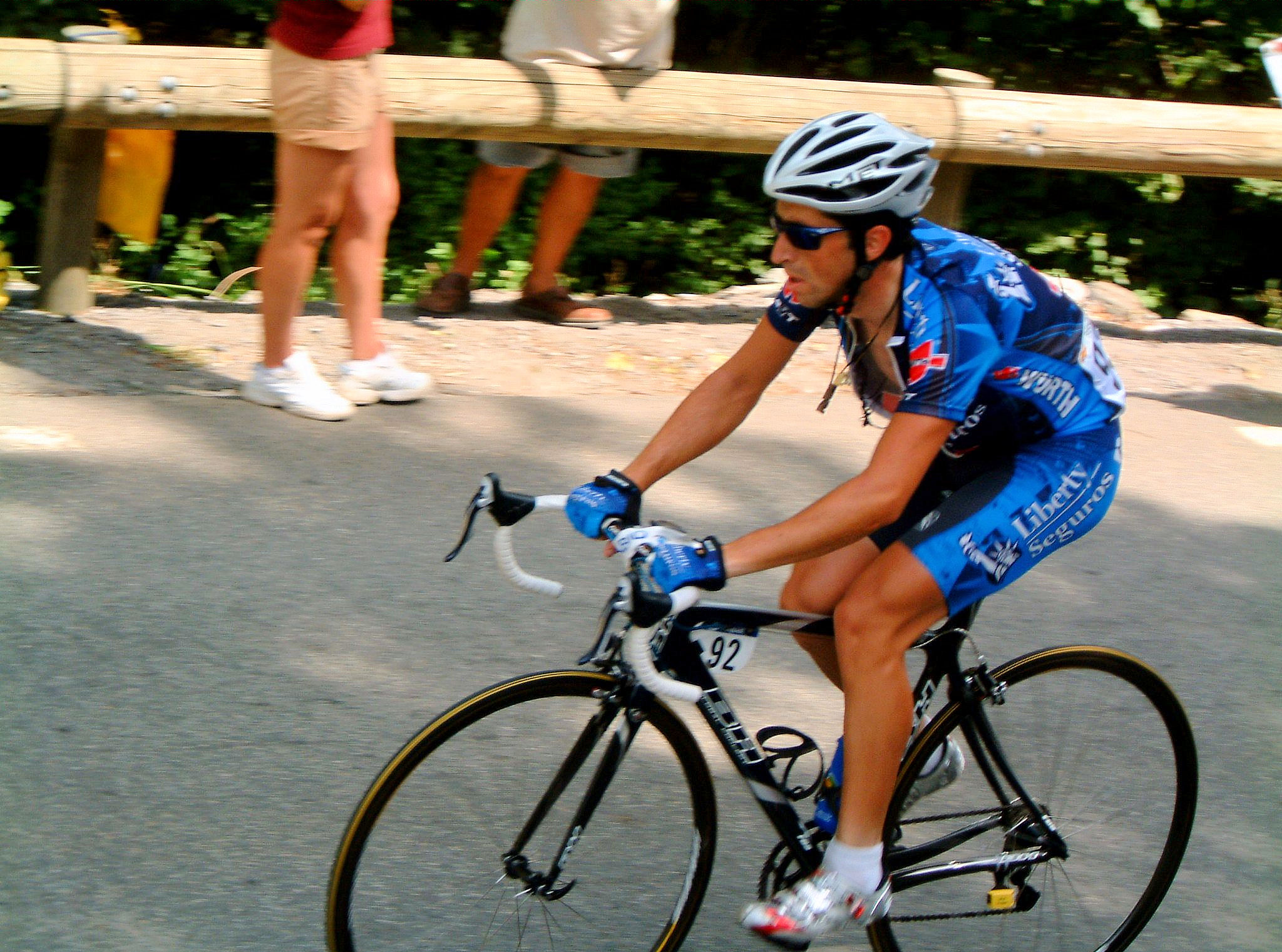
Joseba Beloki

Name	Nationality	Years
Eduardo Chozas	Spain	1989–1991
Anselmo Fuerte	Spain	1990–1992
Marino Lejarreta	Spain	1990–1992
Melcior Mauri	Spain	1990–1992, 1995–1998
Juan Llaneras	Spain	1991–1995
Alex Zülle	Switzerland	1991–1997
Johan Bruyneel	Belgium	1992–1995, 1998
Laurent Jalabert	France	1992–2000
Erik Breukink	Netherlands	1993–1995
Laurent Dufaux	Switzerland	1993–1994
David Etxebarria	Spain	1994–2000, 2005–2006
Patrick Jonker	Australia	1995–1996
Íñigo Cuesta	Spain	1996–2000
Mikel Zarrabeitia	Spain	1996–2003
Carlos Sastre	Spain	1997–2001
José Iván Gutiérrez	Spain	1999–2001
Peter Luttenberger	Austria	1999–2000
Isidro Nozal	Spain	1999–2006
Abraham Olano	Spain	1999–2002
David Arroyo	Spain	2001–2003
José Azevedo	Portugal	2001–2003
Joseba Beloki	Spain	2001–2003, 2005–2006
Igor González de Galdeano	Spain	2001–2005
Jörg Jaksche	Germany	2001–2003, 2005–2006
Iván Parra	Colombia	2001–2002
Giampaolo Caruso	Italy	2002–2006
Alberto Contador	Spain	2002–2006
Allan Davis	Australia	2003–2006
Koldo Gil	Spain	2003–2005
Luis León Sánchez	Spain	2003–2006
Carlos Barredo	Spain	2004–2006
Roberto Heras	Spain	2004–2005
José Joaquín Rojas	Spain	2005–2006
Michele Scarponi	Italy	2005–2006
Andrey Kashechkin	Kazakhstan	2006
Alexander Vinokourov	Kazakhstan	2006
