= List of teams and cyclists in the 2006 Vuelta a España =

The list of teams and cyclists in the 2006 Vuelta a España contains the professional road bicycle racers who competed at the 2006 Vuelta a España from August 26 to September 17, 2006.

Rabobank (Netherlands) RAB
Nr.		Age		Pos.
1	Denis Menchov	28	(Russia)	DNF
2	Mauricio Ardila Cano	27	(Colombia)	67
3	Theo Eltink	24	(Netherlands)	24
4	William Walker	20	(Australia)	112
5	Pedro Horrillo	31	(Spain)	106
6	Michael Boogerd	34	(Netherlands)	DNF
7	Grischa Niermann	30	(Germany)	72
8	Michael Rasmussen	32	(Denmark)	DNF
9	Pieter Weening	25	(Netherlands)	61
Team manager:

Team CSC (Denmark) CSC
Nr.		Age		Pos.
11	Carlos Sastre	31	(Spain)	4
12	Kurt Asle Arvesen	31	(Norway)	46
13	Lars Bak	26	(Denmark)	21
14	Fabian Cancellara	25	(Switzerland)	DNF
15	Íñigo Cuesta	37	(Spain)	27
16	Marcus Ljungqvist	31	(Sweden)	53
17	Stuart O'Grady	32	(Australia)	65
18	Volodymyr Hustov	29	(Ukraine)	54
19	Nicki Sørensen	31	(Denmark)	28
Team manager:

AG2R Prévoyance (France) A2R
Nr.		Age		Pos.
21	Cyril Dessel	31	(France)	DNF
22	José Luis Arrieta	35	(Spain)	44
23	Mikel Astarloza	26	(Spain)	56
24	Íñigo Chaurreau	33	(Spain)	26
25	Hubert Dupont	25	(France)	40
26	Stéphane Goubert	36	(France)	29
27	David Navas	32	(Spain)	126
28	Jean-Patrick Nazon	29	(France)	105
29	Alexandre Usov	29	(Belarus)	89
Team manager:

Bouygues Télécom (France) BTL
Nr.		Age		Pos.
31	Walter Bénéteau	34	(France)	83
32	Mathieu Claude	23	(France)	DNF
33	Pierre Drancourt	24	(France)	108
34	Xavier Florencio	26	(Spain)	DNF
35	Anthony Geslin	26	(France)	DNF
36	Christophe Kern	25	(France)	DNF
37	Rony Martias	26	(France)	DNF
38	Jérôme Pineau	26	(France)	DNF
39	Franck Rénier	32	(France)	121
Team manager:

Crédit Agricole (France) C.A
Nr.		Age		Pos.
41	László Bodrogi	29	(Hungary)	76
42	Pietro Caucchioli	30	(Italy)	37
43	Anthony Charteau	27	(France)	DNF
44	Dmitriy Fofonov	30	(Kazakhstan)	32
45	Thor Hushovd	28	(Norway)	82
46	Mads Kaggestad	29	(Norway)	132
47	Cyril Lemoine	23	(France)	134
48	Mark Renshaw	23	(Australia)	DNF
49	Benoît Poilvet	30	(France)	55
Team manager:

Caisse d'Epargne–Illes Balears (Spain) CEI
Nr.		Age		Pos.
51	Alejandro Valverde	26	(Spain)	2
52	Óscar Pereiro	29	(Spain)	49
53	David Arroyo	26	(Spain)	19
54	José Vicente García	34	(Spain)	104
55	Joan Horrach	32	(Spain)	79
56	Vladimir Karpets	25	(Russia)	8
57	Pablo Lastras	30	(Spain)	48
58	Joaquim Rodríguez	27	(Spain)	17
59	Xabier Zandio	29	(Spain)	22
Team manager:

Cofidis (France) COF
Nr.		Age		Pos.
61	Frédéric Bessy	34	(France)	41
62	Leonardo Duque	26	(Colombia)	80
63	Bingen Fernández	33	(Spain)	85
64	Geoffroy Lequatre	25	(France)	103
65	Thierry Marichal	33	(Belgium)	45
66	Sébastien Minard	24	(France)	43
67	Hervé Duclos-Lassalle	26	(France)	DNF
68	Luis Pérez Rodriguez	32	(Spain)	10
69	Staf Scheirlinckx	27	(Belgium)	86
Team manager:

Discovery Channel (United States) DSC
Nr.		Age		Pos.
71	Michael Barry	30	(Canada)	77
72	Manuel Beltrán	35	(Spain)	9
73	Janez Brajkovič	22	(Slovenia)	30
74	Tom Danielson	28	(United States)	6
75	Stijn Devolder	26	(Belgium)	11
76	Vladimir Gusev	24	(Russia)	23
77	Benoît Joachim	30	(Luxembourg)	66
78	Egoi Martínez	27	(Spain)	12, (KOM)
79	Jurgen Van Goolen	26	(Belgium)	39
Team manager:

Davitamon–Lotto (Belgium) DVL
Nr.		Age		Pos.
81	Olivier Kaisen	22	(Belgium)	110
82	Robbie McEwen	34	(Australia)	DNF
83	Pieter Mertens	26	(Belgium)	75
84	Fred Rodriguez	33	(United States)	109
85	Wim De Vocht	24	(Belgium)	DNF
86	Bart Dockx	24	(Belgium)	DNF
87	Christopher Horner	35	(United States)	20
88	Josep Jufré	31	(Spain)	DNF
89	Bjorn Leukemans	29	(Belgium)	93
Team manager:

Euskaltel–Euskadi (Spain) EUS
Nr.		Age		Pos.
91	Samuel Sánchez	28	(Spain)	7
92	Haimar Zubeldia	29	(Spain)	34
93	Iban Mayo	29	(Spain)	35
94	Igor Antón	23	(Spain)	15
95	Markel Irizar	26	(Spain)	94
96	Iñaki Isasi	29	(Spain)	DNF
97	Iñigo Landaluze	29	(Spain)	60
98	Aketza Peña	25	(Spain)	52
99	Rubén Pérez	24	(Spain)	69
Team manager:

Française des Jeux (France) FDJ
Nr.		Age		Pos.
101	Jérémy Roy	23	(France)	122
102	Fabien Patanchon	23	(France)	128
103	Ian McLeod	25	(South Africa)	99
104	Éric Leblacher	28	(France)	33
105	Sébastien Joly	27	(France)	68
106	Frédéric Finot	29	(France)	DNF
107	Bernhard Eisel	25	(Austria)	DNF
108	Christophe Detilloux	32	(Belgium)	DNF
109	Freddy Bichot	26	(France)	DNF
Team manager:

Gerolsteiner (Germany) GST
Nr.		Age		Pos.
111	Davide Rebellin	35	(Italy)	DNF
112	Robert Förster	28	(Germany)	130
113	Markus Fothen	24	(Germany)	DNF
114	René Haselbacher	28	(Austria)	DNF
115	Heinrich Haussler	22	(Germany)	92
116	Torsten Hiekmann	26	(Germany)	57
117	Andrea Moletta	27	(Italy)	DNF
118	Sven Montgomery	30	(Switzerland)	DNF
119	Marcel Strauss	30	(Switzerland)	DNF
Team manager:

Lampre–Fondital (Italy) LAM
Nr.		Age		Pos.
121	Matteo Carrara	27	(Italy)	DNF
122	Claudio Corioni	23	(Italy)	107
123	Enrico Franzoi	24	(Italy)	97
124	David Loosli	26	(Switzerland)	26
125	Marco Marzano	26	(Italy)	DNF
126	Ruggero Marzoli	30	(Italy)	DNF
127	Danilo Napolitano	25	(Italy)	DNF
128	Evgeni Petrov	28	(Russia)	18
129	Sylwester Szmyd	28	(Poland)	14
Team manager:

Liquigas (Italy) LIQ
Nr.		Age		Pos.
131	Danilo Di Luca	30	(Italy)	DNF
132	Dario Andriotto	33	(Italy)	115
133	Magnus Bäckstedt	31	(Sweden)	111
134	Kjell Carlström	29	(Finland)	120
135	Dario Cioni	31	(Italy)	38
136	Francesco Failli	22	(Italy)	123
137	Alessandro Spezialetti	31	(Italy)	100
138	Charlie Wegelius	28	(United Kingdom)	DNF
139	Luca Paolini	29	(Italy)	DNF
Team manager:

Team Milram (Italy) MRM
Nr.		Age		Pos.
141	Alessandro Petacchi	32	(Italy)	DNF
142	Erik Zabel	36	(Germany)	62
143	Daniel Becke	28	(Germany)	DNF
144	Enrico Poitschke	37	(Germany)	133
145	Volodymyr Dyudya	23	(Ukraine)	DNF
146	Alberto Ongarato	31	(Italy)	131
147	Fabio Sacchi	32	(Italy)	96
148	Sebastian Siedler	28	(Germany)	127
149	Marco Velo	32	(Italy)	118
Team manager:

Phonak (Switzerland) PHO
Nr.		Age		Pos.
151	Martín Perdiguero	33	(Spain)	DNF
152	Aurélien Clerc	27	(Switzerland)	114
153	Luis Fernández	26	(Spain)	90
154	Ryder Hesjedal	25	(Canada)	DNF
155	Nicolas Jalabert	33	(France)	DNF
156	Steve Morabito	23	(Switzerland)	84
157	Uroš Murn	31	(Slovenia)	113
158	Florian Stalder	23	(Switzerland)	73
159	Steve Zampieri	29	(Switzerland)	DNF
Team manager:

Quick-Step–Innergetic (Belgium) QSI
Nr.		Age		Pos.
161	Paolo Bettini	32	(Italy)	DNF
162	Davide Viganò	22	(Italy)	117
163	Kevin van Impe	25	(Belgium)	129
164	Matteo Tosatto	32	(Italy)	DNF
165	Sébastien Rosseler	25	(Belgium)	116
166	Kevin Hulsmans	28	(Belgium)	95
167	José Antonio Garrido	30	(Spain)	59
168	Addy Engels	29	(Netherlands)	124
169	Kevin De Weert	24	(Belgium)	74
Team manager:

Relax–GAM (Spain) REG
Nr.		Age		Pos.
171	Nácor Burgos	29	(Spain)	DNF
172	Mario De Sárraga	26	(Spain)	102
173	José Miguel Elías	29	(Spain)	25
174	Raúl García de Mateos	24	(Spain)	51
175	Jorge García	26	(Spain)	87
176	David George	30	(South Africa)	70
177	Daniel Moreno	24	(Spain)	36
178	Jesús Hernández	24	(Spain)	DNF
179	Angel Vallejo	25	(Spain)	58
Team manager:

Saunier Duval–Prodir (Spain) SDV
Nr.		Age		Pos.
181	José Alberto Benítez	24	(Spain)	101
182	José Gómez Marchante	26	(Spain)	5
183	David Millar	29	(United Kingdom)	64
184	David Cañada	31	(Spain)	88
185	Juan José Cobo	25	(Spain)	DNF
186	Leonardo Piepoli	34	(Italy)	13
187	David de la Fuente	25	(Spain)	71
188	Ángel Gómez	25	(Spain)	DNF
189	Francisco Ventoso	24	(Spain)	78
Team manager:

T-Mobile Team (Germany) TMO
Nr.		Age		Pos.
191	Lorenzo Bernucci	26	(Italy)	DNF
192	Scott Davis	27	(Australia)	91
193	Bastiaan Giling	23	(Netherlands)	125
194	André Greipel	24	(Germany)	DNF
195	Bernhard Kohl	24	(Austria)	DNF
196	André Korff	33	(Germany)	DNF
197	Daniele Nardello	34	(Italy)	50
198	Stephan Schreck	28	(Germany)	81
199	Thomas Ziegler	25	(Germany)	DNF
Team manager:

Astana (Spain) AWT
Nr.		Age		Pos.
201	Alexander Vinokourov	32	(Kazakhstan)	1
202	Carlos Barredo	25	(Spain)	42
203	Assan Bazayev	25	(Kazakhstan)	98
204	José Antonio Redondo	21	(Spain)	47
205	Andrey Kashechkin	26	(Kazakhstan)	3
206	Aaron Kemps	22	(Australia)	119
207	Sérgio Paulinho	26	(Portugal)	16
208	Luis Sanchez Gil	22	(Spain)	DNF
209	Sergei Yakovlev	30	(Kazakhstan)	31
Team manager:

== See also ==
- 2006 Vuelta a España
