= 2006 Vuelta a España, Stage 12 to Stage 21 =

Cycling race stages

The 2006 Vuelta a España was the 61st edition of the Vuelta a España, one of cycling's Grand Tours. The Vuelta began in Málaga, with a team time trial on 26 August, and Stage 12 occurred on 7 September with a stage to Aranda de Duero. The race finished in Madrid on 17 September.

== Stage 12 ==
7 September 2006 — Aranda de Duero to Guadalajara, 162 km (101 mi)

Route profile:

Stage 12 result

Rank	Rider	Team	Time
1	Luca Paolini (ITA)	Liquigas	3h 35' 07"
2	Bart Dockx (BEL)	Davitamon–Lotto	+ 5"
3	Paolo Bettini (ITA)	Quick-Step–Innergetic	s.t.
4	Vladimir Gusev (RUS)	Discovery Channel	+ 8"
5	David Arroyo (ESP)	Caisse d'Epargne–Illes Balears	s.t.
6	Rubén Pérez (ESP)	Euskaltel–Euskadi	+ 17"
7	Bernhard Eisel (AUT)	Française des Jeux	+ 22"
8	Jean-Patrick Nazon (FRA)	AG2R Prévoyance	s.t.
9	Heinrich Haussler (GER)	Gerolsteiner	+ 33"
10	Bjorn Leukemans (BEL)	Davitamon–Lotto	+ 39"

General classification after stage 12

Rank	Rider	Team	Time
1	Alejandro Valverde (ESP)	Caisse d'Epargne–Illes Balears	49h 38' 46"
2	Andrey Kashechkin (KAZ)	Astana	+ 27"
3	Carlos Sastre (ESP)	Team CSC	+ 44"
4	José Gómez Marchante (ESP)	Saunier Duval–Prodir	+ 56"
5	Alexandre Vinokourov (KAZ)	Astana	+ 1' 38"
6	Janez Brajkovič (SLO)	Discovery Channel	+ 2' 05"
7	Manuel Beltrán (ESP)	Discovery Channel	+ 2' 28"
8	Danilo Di Luca (ITA)	Liquigas	+ 2' 31"
9	Vladimir Karpets (RUS)	Caisse d'Epargne–Illes Balears	+ 3' 02"
10	Sérgio Paulinho (POR)	Astana	+ 3' 42"

== Stage 13 ==
8 September 2006 — Guadalajara to Cuenca, 170 km (110 mi)

Route profile:

Stage 13 result

Rank	Rider	Team	Time
1	Samuel Sánchez (ESP)	Euskaltel–Euskadi	4h 03' 43"
2	Thor Hushovd (NOR)	Crédit Agricole	s.t.
3	Alejandro Valverde (ESP)	Caisse d'Epargne–Illes Balears	s.t.
4	Luca Paolini (ITA)	Liquigas	s.t.
5	Paolo Bettini (ITA)	Quick-Step–Innergetic	s.t.
6	Danilo Di Luca (ITA)	Liquigas	s.t.
7	Ruggero Marzoli (ITA)	Lampre–Fondital	s.t.
8	Erik Zabel (GER)	Team Milram	s.t.
9	Stuart O'Grady (AUS)	Team CSC	s.t.
10	Alexandre Vinokourov (KAZ)	Astana	s.t.

General classification after stage 13

Rank	Rider	Team	Time
1	Alejandro Valverde (ESP)	Caisse d'Epargne–Illes Balears	53h 42' 21"
2	Andrey Kashechkin (KAZ)	Astana	+ 35"
3	Carlos Sastre (ESP)	Team CSC	+ 52"
4	José Gómez Marchante (ESP)	Saunier Duval–Prodir	+ 1' 04"
5	Alexandre Vinokourov (KAZ)	Astana	+ 1' 46"
6	Janez Brajkovič (SLO)	Discovery Channel	+ 2' 13"
7	Manuel Beltrán (ESP)	Discovery Channel	+ 2' 36"
8	Danilo Di Luca (ITA)	Liquigas	+ 2' 39"
9	Vladimir Karpets (RUS)	Caisse d'Epargne–Illes Balears	+ 3' 10"
10	Ruggero Marzoli (ITA)	Lampre–Fondital	+ 4' 07"

== Stage 14 ==
9 September 2006 — Cuenca to Cuenca, 220 km (140 mi) (ITT)

Route profile:

Stage 14 result

Rank	Rider	Team	Time
1	David Millar (GBR)	Saunier Duval–Prodir	40' 54"
2	Fabian Cancellara (SUI)	Team CSC	+ 0.5"
3	Alexandre Vinokourov (KAZ)	Astana	+ 5"
4	Alejandro Valverde (ESP)	Caisse d'Epargne–Illes Balears	+ 13"
5	Andrey Kashechkin (KAZ)	Astana	+ 26"
6	Stijn Devolder (BEL)	Discovery Channel	+ 44"
7	László Bodrogi (HUN)	Crédit Agricole	+ 45"
8	Carlos Sastre (ESP)	Team CSC	+ 46"
9	Stuart O'Grady (AUS)	Team CSC	+ 54"
10	Vladimir Karpets (RUS)	Caisse d'Epargne–Illes Balears	+ 1' 03"

General classification after stage 14

Rank	Rider	Team	Time
1	Alejandro Valverde (ESP)	Caisse d'Epargne–Illes Balears	54h 23' 28"
2	Andrey Kashechkin (KAZ)	Astana	+ 48"
3	Carlos Sastre (ESP)	Team CSC	+ 1' 25"
4	Alexandre Vinokourov (KAZ)	Astana	+ 1' 38"
5	José Gómez Marchante (ESP)	Saunier Duval–Prodir	+ 2' 06"
6	Janez Brajkovič (SLO)	Discovery Channel	+ 3' 49"
7	Vladimir Karpets (RUS)	Caisse d'Epargne–Illes Balears	+ 4' 00"
8	Danilo Di Luca (ITA)	Liquigas	+ 4' 31"
9	Manuel Beltrán (ESP)	Discovery Channel	+ 5' 03"
10	Ruggero Marzoli (ITA)	Lampre–Fondital	+ 7' 02"

== Stage 15 ==
10 September 2006 — Motilla del Palancar to Factoría Ford (Almussafes), 175 km (109 mi)

Route profile:

Stage 15 result

Rank	Rider	Team	Time
1	Robert Förster (GER)	Gerolsteiner	4h 24' 55"
2	Stuart O'Grady (AUS)	Team CSC	s.t.
3	Danilo Napolitano (ITA)	Lampre–Fondital	s.t.
4	Thor Hushovd (NOR)	Crédit Agricole	s.t.
5	Paolo Bettini (ITA)	Quick-Step–Innergetic	s.t.
6	Aurélien Clerc (SUI)	Phonak	s.t.
7	Aaron Kemps (AUS)	Astana	s.t.
8	Geoffroy Lequatre (FRA)	Cofidis	s.t.
9	Fred Rodriguez (USA)	Davitamon–Lotto	s.t.
10	Jean-Patrick Nazon (FRA)	AG2R Prévoyance	s.t.

General classification after stage 15

Rank	Rider	Team	Time
1	Alejandro Valverde (ESP)	Caisse d'Epargne–Illes Balears	58h 48' 23"
2	Andrey Kashechkin (KAZ)	Astana	+ 48"
3	Carlos Sastre (ESP)	Team CSC	+ 1' 25"
4	Alexandre Vinokourov (KAZ)	Astana	+ 1' 38"
5	José Gómez Marchante (ESP)	Saunier Duval–Prodir	+ 2' 23"
6	Janez Brajkovič (SLO)	Discovery Channel	+ 3' 49"
7	Vladimir Karpets (RUS)	Caisse d'Epargne–Illes Balears	+ 4' 29"
8	Danilo Di Luca (ITA)	Liquigas	+ 4' 48"
9	Manuel Beltrán (ESP)	Discovery Channel	+ 5' 03"
10	Stijn Devolder (BEL)	Discovery Channel	+ 7' 15"

== Rest day 2 ==
11 September 2006

== Stage 16 ==
12 September 2006 — Almería to Observatorio Astronómico de Calar Alto, 145 km (90 mi)

Route profile:

Stage 16 result

Rank	Rider	Team	Time
1	Igor Antón (ESP)	Euskaltel–Euskadi	4h 29' 42"
2	Alejandro Valverde (ESP)	Caisse d'Epargne–Illes Balears	+ 23"
3	Alexandre Vinokourov (KAZ)	Astana	s.t.
4	Samuel Sánchez (ESP)	Euskaltel–Euskadi	s.t.
5	Carlos Sastre (ESP)	Team CSC	+ 28"
6	Tom Danielson (USA)	Discovery Channel	+ 30"
7	Manuel Beltrán (ESP)	Discovery Channel	+ 42"
8	Luis Pérez Rodriguez (ESP)	Cofidis	+ 1' 10"
9	José Antonio Redondo (ESP)	Astana	+ 1' 13"
10	Stijn Devolder (BEL)	Discovery Channel	+ 1' 15"

General classification after stage 16

Rank	Rider	Team	Time
1	Alejandro Valverde (ESP)	Caisse d'Epargne–Illes Balears	63h 18' 16"
2	Alexandre Vinokourov (KAZ)	Astana	+ 1' 42"
3	Carlos Sastre (ESP)	Team CSC	s.t.
4	Andrey Kashechkin (KAZ)	Astana	+ 2' 05"
5	José Gómez Marchante (ESP)	Saunier Duval–Prodir	+ 4' 23"
6	Manuel Beltrán (ESP)	Discovery Channel	+ 5' 34"
7	Danilo Di Luca (ITA)	Liquigas	+ 5' 56"
8	Vladimir Karpets (RUS)	Caisse d'Epargne–Illes Balears	+ 6' 29"
9	Samuel Sánchez (ESP)	Euskaltel–Euskadi	+ 7' 53"
10	Tom Danielson (USA)	Discovery Channel	+ 8' 05"

== Stage 17 ==
13 September 2006 — Adra to Granada, 167 km (104 mi)

Route profile:

Stage 17 result

Rank	Rider	Team	Time
1	Tom Danielson (USA)	Discovery Channel	4h 09' 55"
2	Alexandre Vinokourov (KAZ)	Astana	s.t.
3	Samuel Sánchez (ESP)	Euskaltel–Euskadi	+ 1' 10"
4	Andrey Kashechkin (KAZ)	Astana	+ 1' 39"
5	Carlos Sastre (ESP)	Team CSC	s.t.
6	Stéphane Goubert (FRA)	AG2R Prévoyance	s.t.
7	Luis Pérez Rodriguez (ESP)	Cofidis	s.t.
8	Alejandro Valverde (ESP)	Caisse d'Epargne–Illes Balears	s.t.
9	José Gómez Marchante (ESP)	Saunier Duval–Prodir	s.t.
10	Leonardo Piepoli (ITA)	Saunier Duval–Prodir	s.t.

General classification after stage 17

Rank	Rider	Team	Time
1	Alexandre Vinokourov (KAZ)	Astana	67h 29' 41"
2	Alejandro Valverde (ESP)	Caisse d'Epargne–Illes Balears	+ 9"
3	Carlos Sastre (ESP)	Team CSC	+ 1' 51"
4	Andrey Kashechkin (KAZ)	Astana	+ 2' 14"
5	José Gómez Marchante (ESP)	Saunier Duval–Prodir	+ 4' 32"
6	Tom Danielson (USA)	Discovery Channel	+ 6' 07"
7	Manuel Beltrán (ESP)	Discovery Channel	+ 6' 33"
8	Samuel Sánchez (ESP)	Euskaltel–Euskadi	+ 7' 25"
9	Vladimir Karpets (RUS)	Caisse d'Epargne–Illes Balears	+ 7' 49"
10	Luis Pérez Rodriguez (ESP)	Cofidis	+ 9' 04"

== Stage 18 ==
14 September 2006 — Granada to Sierra de la Pandera, 153 km (95 mi)

Route profile:

Stage 18 result

Rank	Rider	Team	Time
1	Andrey Kashechkin (KAZ)	Astana	3h 57' 39"
2	Alexandre Vinokourov (KAZ)	Astana	s.t.
3	José Gómez Marchante (ESP)	Saunier Duval–Prodir	+ 30"
4	Alejandro Valverde (ESP)	Caisse d'Epargne–Illes Balears	+ 32"
5	Leonardo Piepoli (ITA)	Saunier Duval–Prodir	+ 35"
6	Igor Antón (ESP)	Euskaltel–Euskadi	s.t.
7	Samuel Sánchez (ESP)	Euskaltel–Euskadi	+ 46"
8	Tom Danielson (USA)	Discovery Channel	s.t.
9	Luis Pérez Rodriguez (ESP)	Cofidis	+ 48"
10	Carlos Sastre (ESP)	Team CSC	s.t.

General classification after stage 18

Rank	Rider	Team	Time
1	Alexandre Vinokourov (KAZ)	Astana	71h 27' 08"
2	Alejandro Valverde (ESP)	Caisse d'Epargne–Illes Balears	+ 53"
3	Andrey Kashechkin (KAZ)	Astana	+ 2' 06"
4	Carlos Sastre (ESP)	Team CSC	+ 2' 51"
5	José Gómez Marchante (ESP)	Saunier Duval–Prodir	+ 5' 06"
6	Tom Danielson (USA)	Discovery Channel	+ 7' 05"
7	Samuel Sánchez (ESP)	Euskaltel–Euskadi	+ 8' 23"
8	Manuel Beltrán (ESP)	Discovery Channel	+ 8' 28"
9	Luis Pérez Rodriguez (ESP)	Cofidis	+ 10' 04"
10	Vladimir Karpets (RUS)	Caisse d'Epargne–Illes Balears	+ 10' 06"

== Stage 19 ==
15 September 2006 — Jaén to Ciudad Real, 195 km (121 mi)

Route profile:

Stage 19 result

Rank	Rider	Team	Time
1	José Luis Arrieta (ESP)	AG2R Prévoyance	5h 30' 14"
2	Dmitriy Fofonov (KAZ)	Crédit Agricole	s.t.
3	David Loosli (SUI)	Lampre–Fondital	+ 2"
4	Lars Bak (DEN)	Team CSC	+ 9"
5	Vladimir Gusev (RUS)	Discovery Channel	+ 30"
6	Pieter Mertens (BEL)	Davitamon–Lotto	s.t.
7	José Vicente García (ESP)	Caisse d'Epargne–Illes Balears	s.t.
8	Aketza Peña (ESP)	Euskaltel–Euskadi	s.t.
9	Aurélien Clerc (SUI)	Phonak	+ 11' 16"
10	Thor Hushovd (NOR)	Crédit Agricole	s.t.

General classification after stage 19

Rank	Rider	Team	Time
1	Alexandre Vinokourov (KAZ)	Astana	77h 08' 38"
2	Alejandro Valverde (ESP)	Caisse d'Epargne–Illes Balears	+ 53"
3	Andrey Kashechkin (KAZ)	Astana	+ 2' 06"
4	Carlos Sastre (ESP)	Team CSC	+ 2' 51"
5	José Gómez Marchante (ESP)	Saunier Duval–Prodir	+ 5' 06"
6	Tom Danielson (USA)	Discovery Channel	+ 7' 05"
7	Samuel Sánchez (ESP)	Euskaltel–Euskadi	+ 8' 23"
8	Manuel Beltrán (ESP)	Discovery Channel	+ 8' 28"
9	Luis Pérez Rodriguez (ESP)	Cofidis	+ 10' 04"
10	Vladimir Karpets (RUS)	Caisse d'Epargne–Illes Balears	+ 10' 06"

== Stage 20 ==
16 September 2006 — Rivas Futura to Rivas Vaciamadrid, 28 km (17 mi) (ITT)

Route profile:

Stage 20 result

Rank	Rider	Team	Time
1	Alexandre Vinokourov (KAZ)	Astana	33' 39"
2	Samuel Sánchez (ESP)	Euskaltel–Euskadi	+ 6"
3	Alejandro Valverde (ESP)	Caisse d'Epargne–Illes Balears	+ 19"
4	László Bodrogi (HUN)	Crédit Agricole	+ 26"
5	Vladimir Karpets (RUS)	Caisse d'Epargne–Illes Balears	+ 30"
6	Stuart O'Grady (AUS)	Team CSC	+ 32"
7	Carlos Sastre (ESP)	Team CSC	+ 44"
8	Vladimir Gusev (RUS)	Discovery Channel	+ 49"
9	Torsten Hiekmann (GER)	Gerolsteiner	+ 55"
10	Sébastien Rosseler (BEL)	Quick-Step–Innergetic	+ 1' 00"

General classification after stage 20

Rank	Rider	Team	Time
1	Alexandre Vinokourov (KAZ)	Astana	77h 42' 17"
2	Alejandro Valverde (ESP)	Caisse d'Epargne–Illes Balears	+ 1' 12"
3	Andrey Kashechkin (KAZ)	Astana	+ 3' 12"
4	Carlos Sastre (ESP)	Team CSC	+ 3' 35"
5	José Gómez Marchante (ESP)	Saunier Duval–Prodir	+ 6' 51"
6	Tom Danielson (USA)	Discovery Channel	+ 8' 09"
7	Samuel Sánchez (ESP)	Euskaltel–Euskadi	+ 8' 29"
8	Vladimir Karpets (RUS)	Caisse d'Epargne–Illes Balears	+ 10' 36"
9	Manuel Beltrán (ESP)	Discovery Channel	+ 10' 47"
10	Luis Pérez Rodriguez (ESP)	Cofidis	+ 11' 32"

== Stage 21 ==
17 September 2006 — Madrid to Madrid, 150 km (93 mi)

Route profile:

Stage 21 result

Rank	Rider	Team	Time
1	Erik Zabel (GER)	Team Milram	3h 40' 47"
2	Thor Hushovd (NOR)	Crédit Agricole	s.t.
3	Aurélien Clerc (SUI)	Phonak	s.t.
4	Robert Förster (GER)	Gerolsteiner	s.t.
5	Stuart O'Grady (AUS)	Team CSC	s.t.
6	Francisco Ventoso (ESP)	Saunier Duval–Prodir	s.t.
7	Fred Rodriguez (USA)	Davitamon–Lotto	s.t.
8	Marco Velo (ITA)	Team Milram	s.t.
9	Claudio Corioni (ITA)	Lampre–Fondital	s.t.
10	Davide Viganò (ITA)	Quick-Step–Innergetic	s.t.

General classification after stage 21

Rank	Rider	Team	Time
1	Alexandre Vinokourov (KAZ)	Astana	81h 23' 07"
2	Alejandro Valverde (ESP)	Caisse d'Epargne–Illes Balears	+ 1' 12"
3	Andrey Kashechkin (KAZ)	Astana	+ 3' 12"
4	Carlos Sastre (ESP)	Team CSC	+ 3' 35"
5	José Gómez Marchante (ESP)	Saunier Duval–Prodir	+ 6' 51"
6	Tom Danielson (USA)	Discovery Channel	+ 8' 09"
7	Samuel Sánchez (ESP)	Euskaltel–Euskadi	+ 8' 26"
8	Vladimir Karpets (RUS)	Caisse d'Epargne–Illes Balears	+ 10' 36"
9	Manuel Beltrán (ESP)	Discovery Channel	+ 10' 47"
10	Luis Pérez Rodriguez (ESP)	Cofidis	+ 11' 32"
