= 2006 Vuelta a España, Stage 1 to Stage 11 =

Cycling race stages

The 2006 Vuelta a España was the 61st edition of the Vuelta a España, one of cycling's Grand Tours. The Vuelta began in Málaga, with a team time trial on 26 August, and Stage 11 occurred on 6 September with a stage to Burgos. The race finished in Madrid on 17 September.

== Stage 1 ==
26 August 2006 — Málaga to Málaga, 7.2 km (4.5 mi) (TTT)

Stage 1 result

Rank	Team	Time
1	Team CSC	7' 36"
2	Caisse d'Epargne–Illes Balears	+ 7"
3	Team Milram	+ 8"
4	Discovery Channel	+ 9"
5	T-Mobile Team	+ 11"
6	Astana	+ 12"
7	Saunier Duval–Prodir	+ 13"
8	Crédit Agricole	s.t.
9	Liquigas	s.t.
10	Quick-Step–Innergetic	+ 15"

General classification after stage 1

Rank	Rider	Team	Time
1	Carlos Sastre (ESP)	Team CSC	7' 36"
2	Lars Bak (DEN)	Team CSC	+ 2"
3	Nicki Sørensen (DEN)	Team CSC	+ 7"
4	Marcus Ljungqvist (SWE)	Team CSC	s.t.
5	Stuart O'Grady (AUS)	Team CSC	s.t.
6	Íñigo Cuesta (ESP)	Team CSC	s.t.
7	Volodymyr Hustov (UKR)	Team CSC	s.t.
8	Kurt Asle Arvesen (NOR)	Team CSC	s.t.
9	Fabian Cancellara (SUI)	Team CSC	+ 4"
10	José Vicente García (ESP)	Caisse d'Epargne–Illes Balears	+ 7"

== Stage 2 ==
27 August 2006 — Málaga to Córdoba, 167 km (104 mi)

Route profile:

Stage 2 result

Rank	Rider	Team	Time
1	Paolo Bettini (ITA)	Quick-Step–Innergetic	4h 19' 31"
2	Thor Hushovd (NOR)	Crédit Agricole	s.t.
3	Luca Paolini (ITA)	Liquigas	s.t.
4	Robbie McEwen (AUS)	Davitamon–Lotto	s.t.
5	Uroš Murn (SLO)	Phonak	s.t.
6	Francisco Ventoso (ESP)	Saunier Duval–Prodir	s.t.
7	Iñaki Isasi (ESP)	Euskaltel–Euskadi	s.t.
8	Bernhard Eisel (AUT)	Française des Jeux	s.t.
9	Jean-Patrick Nazon (FRA)	AG2R Prévoyance	s.t.
10	Erik Zabel (GER)	Team Milram	s.t.

General classification after stage 2

Rank	Rider	Team	Time
1	Thor Hushovd (NOR)	Crédit Agricole	4h 27' 00"
2	Paolo Bettini (ITA)	Quick-Step–Innergetic	+ 2"
3	Stuart O'Grady (AUS)	Team CSC	+ 7"
4	Lars Bak (DEN)	Team CSC	s.t.
5	Kurt Asle Arvesen (NOR)	Team CSC	s.t.
6	Nicki Sørensen (DEN)	Team CSC	s.t.
7	Marcus Ljungqvist (SWE)	Team CSC	s.t.
8	Íñigo Cuesta (ESP)	Team CSC	s.t.
9	Volodymyr Hustov (UKR)	Team CSC	s.t.
10	Carlos Sastre (ESP)	Team CSC	s.t.

== Stage 3 ==
28 August 2006 — Córdoba to Almendralejo, 220 km (140 mi)

Route profile:

Stage 3 result

Rank	Rider	Team	Time
1	Francisco Ventoso (ESP)	Saunier Duval–Prodir	5h 43' 45"
2	Thor Hushovd (NOR)	Crédit Agricole	s.t.
3	Stuart O'Grady (AUS)	Team CSC	s.t.
4	Erik Zabel (GER)	Team Milram	s.t.
5	Robbie McEwen (AUS)	Davitamon–Lotto	s.t.
6	Danilo Napolitano (ITA)	Lampre–Fondital	s.t.
7	Luca Paolini (ITA)	Liquigas	s.t.
8	Pedro Horrillo (ESP)	Rabobank	s.t.
9	Aurélien Clerc (SUI)	Phonak	s.t.
10	Jean-Patrick Nazon (FRA)	AG2R Prévoyance	s.t.

General classification after stage 3

Rank	Rider	Team	Time
1	Thor Hushovd (NOR)	Crédit Agricole	10h 10' 33"
2	Stuart O'Grady (AUS)	Team CSC	+ 11"
3	Francisco Ventoso (ESP)	Saunier Duval–Prodir	+ 12"
4	Paolo Bettini (ITA)	Quick-Step–Innergetic	+ 14"
5	Kurt Asle Arvesen (NOR)	Team CSC	+ 19"
6	Nicki Sørensen (DEN)	Team CSC	s.t.
7	Lars Bak (DEN)	Team CSC	s.t.
8	Marcus Ljungqvist (SWE)	Team CSC	s.t.
9	Carlos Sastre (ESP)	Team CSC	s.t.
10	Volodymyr Hustov (UKR)	Team CSC	s.t.

== Stage 4 ==
29 August 2006 — Almendralejo to Cáceres, 142 km (88 mi)

Route profile:

Stage 4 result

Rank	Rider	Team	Time
1	Erik Zabel (GER)	Team Milram	3h 24' 46"
2	Thor Hushovd (NOR)	Crédit Agricole	s.t.
3	Jean-Patrick Nazon (FRA)	AG2R Prévoyance	s.t.
4	Stuart O'Grady (AUS)	Team CSC	s.t.
5	Francisco Ventoso (ESP)	Saunier Duval–Prodir	s.t.
6	Bernhard Eisel (AUT)	Française des Jeux	s.t.
7	André Greipel (GER)	T-Mobile Team	s.t.
8	Paolo Bettini (ITA)	Quick-Step–Innergetic	s.t.
9	Robbie McEwen (AUS)	Davitamon–Lotto	s.t.
10	Luca Paolini (ITA)	Liquigas	s.t.

General classification after stage 4

Rank	Rider	Team	Time
1	Thor Hushovd (NOR)	Crédit Agricole	13h 34' 59"
2	Erik Zabel (GER)	Team Milram	+ 27"
3	Stuart O'Grady (AUS)	Team CSC	s.t.
4	Francisco Ventoso (ESP)	Saunier Duval–Prodir	+ 32"
5	Paolo Bettini (ITA)	Quick-Step–Innergetic	+ 34"
6	Kurt Asle Arvesen (NOR)	Team CSC	+ 39"
7	Lars Bak (DEN)	Team CSC	s.t.
8	Nicki Sørensen (DEN)	Team CSC	s.t.
9	Marcus Ljungqvist (SWE)	Team CSC	s.t.
10	Carlos Sastre (ESP)	Team CSC	s.t.

== Stage 5 ==
30 August 2006 — Plasencia to Estación de Esquí La Covatilla (Béjar), 178 km (111 mi)

Route profile:

Stage 5 result

Rank	Rider	Team	Time
1	Danilo Di Luca (ITA)	Liquigas	5h 02' 25"
2	Janez Brajkovič (SLO)	Discovery Channel	s.t.
3	Andrey Kashechkin (KAZ)	Astana	+ 7"
4	José Gómez Marchante (ESP)	Saunier Duval–Prodir	+ 15"
5	Carlos Sastre (ESP)	Team CSC	+ 22"
6	Alejandro Valverde (ESP)	Caisse d'Epargne–Illes Balears	s.t.
7	Ruggero Marzoli (ITA)	Lampre–Fondital	+ 36"
8	Samuel Sánchez (ESP)	Euskaltel–Euskadi	+ 39"
9	Manuel Beltrán (ESP)	Discovery Channel	s.t.
10	Bernhard Kohl (AUT)	T-Mobile Team	+ 42"

General classification after stage 5

Rank	Rider	Team	Time
1	Danilo Di Luca (ITA)	Liquigas	18h 37' 56"
2	Janez Brajkovič (SLO)	Discovery Channel	+ 4"
3	Andrey Kashechkin (KAZ)	Astana	+ 18"
4	Carlos Sastre (ESP)	Team CSC	+ 29"
5	José Gómez Marchante (ESP)	Saunier Duval–Prodir	+ 35"
6	Alejandro Valverde (ESP)	Caisse d'Epargne–Illes Balears	+ 36"
7	Manuel Beltrán (ESP)	Discovery Channel	+ 55"
8	Tom Danielson (USA)	Discovery Channel	+ 58"
9	Bernhard Kohl (AUT)	T-Mobile Team	+ 1' 00"
10	Samuel Sánchez (ESP)	Euskaltel–Euskadi	+ 1' 04"

== Stage 6 ==
31 August 2006 — Zamora to León, 155 km (96 mi)

Route profile:

Stage 6 result

Rank	Rider	Team	Time
1	Thor Hushovd (NOR)	Crédit Agricole	4h 09' 10"
2	André Greipel (GER)	T-Mobile Team	s.t.
3	Erik Zabel (GER)	Team Milram	s.t.
4	Alessandro Petacchi (ITA)	Team Milram	s.t.
5	Danilo Napolitano (ITA)	Lampre–Fondital	s.t.
6	Bernhard Eisel (AUT)	Française des Jeux	s.t.
7	Luca Paolini (ITA)	Liquigas	s.t.
8	Stuart O'Grady (AUS)	Team CSC	s.t.
9	Alexandre Usov (BLR)	AG2R Prévoyance	s.t.
10	Francisco Ventoso (ESP)	Saunier Duval–Prodir	s.t.

General classification after stage 6

Rank	Rider	Team	Time
1	Danilo Di Luca (ITA)	Liquigas	22h 47' 11"
2	Janez Brajkovič (SLO)	Discovery Channel	+ 4"
3	Andrey Kashechkin (KAZ)	Astana	+ 18"
4	Carlos Sastre (ESP)	Team CSC	+ 29"
5	José Gómez Marchante (ESP)	Saunier Duval–Prodir	+ 35"
6	Alejandro Valverde (ESP)	Caisse d'Epargne–Illes Balears	+ 36"
7	Manuel Beltrán (ESP)	Discovery Channel	+ 55"
8	Tom Danielson (USA)	Discovery Channel	+ 58"
9	Ruggero Marzoli (ITA)	Lampre–Fondital	+ 59"
10	Bernhard Kohl (AUT)	T-Mobile Team	+ 1' 00"

== Stage 7 ==
1 September 2006 — León to Alto de El Morredero (Ponferrada), 148 km (92 mi)

Route profile:

Stage 7 result

Rank	Rider	Team	Time
1	Alejandro Valverde (ESP)	Caisse d'Epargne–Illes Balears	4h 01' 05"
2	Carlos Sastre (ESP)	Team CSC	+ 4"
3	José Gómez Marchante (ESP)	Saunier Duval–Prodir	+ 6"
4	Janez Brajkovič (SLO)	Discovery Channel	+ 7"
5	Manuel Beltrán (ESP)	Discovery Channel	s.t.
6	Alexandre Vinokourov (KAZ)	Astana	+ 12"
7	Luis Pérez Rodriguez (ESP)	Cofidis	+ 16"
8	Andrey Kashechkin (KAZ)	Astana	s.t.
9	Stijn Devolder (BEL)	Discovery Channel	+ 23"
10	Ruggero Marzoli (ITA)	Lampre–Fondital	+ 29"

General classification after stage 7

Rank	Rider	Team	Time
1	Janez Brajkovič (SLO)	Discovery Channel	26h 48' 27"
2	Alejandro Valverde (ESP)	Caisse d'Epargne–Illes Balears	+ 5"
3	Carlos Sastre (ESP)	Team CSC	+ 10"
4	José Gómez Marchante (ESP)	Saunier Duval–Prodir	+ 22"
5	Andrey Kashechkin (KAZ)	Astana	+ 23"
6	Manuel Beltrán (ESP)	Discovery Channel	+ 51"
7	Ruggero Marzoli (ITA)	Lampre–Fondital	+ 1' 17"
8	Bernhard Kohl (AUT)	T-Mobile Team	+ 1' 37"
9	Danilo Di Luca (ITA)	Liquigas	+ 1' 47"
10	Alexandre Vinokourov (KAZ)	Astana	+ 2' 28"

== Stage 8 ==
2 September 2006 — Ponferrada to Lugo, 173 km (107 mi)

Route profile:

Stage 8 result

Rank	Rider	Team	Time
1	Alexandre Vinokourov (KAZ)	Astana	4h 02' 11"
2	Ruggero Marzoli (ITA)	Lampre–Fondital	+ 1"
3	Uroš Murn (SLO)	Phonak	s.t.
4	Thor Hushovd (NOR)	Crédit Agricole	s.t.
5	Paolo Bettini (ITA)	Quick-Step–Innergetic	s.t.
6	Erik Zabel (GER)	Team Milram	s.t.
7	Samuel Sánchez (ESP)	Euskaltel–Euskadi	s.t.
8	Thomas Ziegler (GER)	T-Mobile Team	s.t.
9	Andrea Moletta (ITA)	Gerolsteiner	s.t.
10	Davide Rebellin (ITA)	Gerolsteiner	s.t.

General classification after stage 8

Rank	Rider	Team	Time
1	Janez Brajkovič (SLO)	Discovery Channel	30h 50' 39"
2	Alejandro Valverde (ESP)	Caisse d'Epargne–Illes Balears	+ 5"
3	Carlos Sastre (ESP)	Team CSC	+ 10"
4	José Gómez Marchante (ESP)	Saunier Duval–Prodir	+ 22"
5	Andrey Kashechkin (KAZ)	Astana	+ 23"
6	Manuel Beltrán (ESP)	Discovery Channel	+ 51"
7	Ruggero Marzoli (ITA)	Lampre–Fondital	+ 1' 05"
8	Bernhard Kohl (AUT)	T-Mobile Team	+ 1' 37"
9	Danilo Di Luca (ITA)	Liquigas	+ 1' 47"
10	Alexandre Vinokourov (KAZ)	Astana	+ 2' 07"

== Stage 9 ==
3 September 2006 — A Fonsagrada to Alto de La Cobertoria, 206 km (128 mi)

Route profile:

Stage 9 result

Rank	Rider	Team	Time
1	Alexandre Vinokourov (KAZ)	Astana	5h 50' 43"
2	Alejandro Valverde (ESP)	Caisse d'Epargne–Illes Balears	+ 16"
3	Andrey Kashechkin (KAZ)	Astana	+ 21"
4	Carlos Sastre (ESP)	Team CSC	+ 43"
5	José Gómez Marchante (ESP)	Saunier Duval–Prodir	s.t.
6	Danilo Di Luca (ITA)	Liquigas	s.t.
7	Manuel Beltrán (ESP)	Discovery Channel	+ 1' 46"
8	Leonardo Piepoli (ITA)	Saunier Duval–Prodir	s.t.
9	Samuel Sánchez (ESP)	Euskaltel–Euskadi	+ 1' 59"
10	Stijn Devolder (BEL)	Discovery Channel	+ 2' 14"

General classification after stage 9

Rank	Rider	Team	Time
1	Alejandro Valverde (ESP)	Caisse d'Epargne–Illes Balears	36h 41' 31"
2	Andrey Kashechkin (KAZ)	Astana	+ 27"
3	Carlos Sastre (ESP)	Team CSC	+ 44"
4	José Gómez Marchante (ESP)	Saunier Duval–Prodir	+ 56"
5	Alexandre Vinokourov (KAZ)	Astana	+ 1' 38"
6	Janez Brajkovič (SLO)	Discovery Channel	+ 2' 05"
7	Danilo Di Luca (ITA)	Liquigas	+ 2' 21"
8	Manuel Beltrán (ESP)	Discovery Channel	+ 2' 28"
9	Ruggero Marzoli (ITA)	Lampre–Fondital	+ 3' 59"
10	Sylwester Szmyd (POL)	Lampre–Fondital	+ 5' 18"

== Rest day 1 ==
4 September 2006

== Stage 10 ==
5 September 2006 — Avilés to Museo de Altamia (Santillana del Mar), 190 km (120 mi)

Route profile:

Stage 10 result

Rank	Rider	Team	Time
1	Sérgio Paulinho (POR)	Astana	4h 33' 44"
2	Davide Rebellin (ITA)	Gerolsteiner	+ 2"
3	Xavier Florencio (ESP)	Bouygues Télécom	s.t.
4	Vladimir Karpets (RUS)	Caisse d'Epargne–Illes Balears	+ 6"
5	Francisco Ventoso (ESP)	Saunier Duval–Prodir	+ 7"
6	Vladimir Gusev (RUS)	Discovery Channel	s.t.
7	Sébastien Joly (FRA)	Française des Jeux	s.t.
8	Sébastien Minard (FRA)	Cofidis	s.t.
9	Dmitriy Fofonov (KAZ)	Crédit Agricole	s.t.
10	Evgeni Petrov (RUS)	Lampre–Fondital	s.t.

General classification after stage 10

Rank	Rider	Team	Time
1	Alejandro Valverde (ESP)	Caisse d'Epargne–Illes Balears	41h 19' 09"
2	Andrey Kashechkin (KAZ)	Astana	+ 27"
3	Carlos Sastre (ESP)	Team CSC	+ 44"
4	José Gómez Marchante (ESP)	Saunier Duval–Prodir	+ 56"
5	Alexandre Vinokourov (KAZ)	Astana	+ 1' 38"
6	Janez Brajkovič (SLO)	Discovery Channel	+ 2' 05"
7	Danilo Di Luca (ITA)	Liquigas	+ 2' 21"
8	Manuel Beltrán (ESP)	Discovery Channel	+ 2' 28"
9	Vladimir Karpets (RUS)	Caisse d'Epargne–Illes Balears	+ 3' 02"
10	Sérgio Paulinho (POR)	Astana	+ 3' 42"

== Stage 11 ==
6 September 2006 — Torrelavega to Burgos, 175 km (109 mi)

Route profile:

Stage 11 result

Rank	Rider	Team	Time
1	Egoi Martínez (ESP)	Discovery Channel	4h 20' 32"
2	Iñigo Landaluze (ESP)	Euskaltel–Euskadi	+ 55"
3	Volodymyr Hustov (UKR)	Team CSC	s.t.
4	Thor Hushovd (NOR)	Crédit Agricole	+ 3' 35"
5	Alexandre Usov (BLR)	AG2R Prévoyance	s.t.
6	David Loosli (SUI)	Lampre–Fondital	s.t.
7	Andrea Moletta (ITA)	Gerolsteiner	s.t.
8	Theo Eltink (NED)	Rabobank	s.t.
9	Scott Davis (AUS)	T-Mobile Team	s.t.
10	Joaquim Rodríguez (ESP)	Caisse d'Epargne–Illes Balears	+ 3' 37"

General classification after stage 11

Rank	Rider	Team	Time
1	Alejandro Valverde (ESP)	Caisse d'Epargne–Illes Balears	45h 54' 45"
2	Andrey Kashechkin (KAZ)	Astana	+ 27"
3	Carlos Sastre (ESP)	Team CSC	+ 44"
4	José Gómez Marchante (ESP)	Saunier Duval–Prodir	+ 56"
5	Alexandre Vinokourov (KAZ)	Astana	+ 1' 38"
6	Janez Brajkovič (SLO)	Discovery Channel	+ 2' 05"
7	Danilo Di Luca (ITA)	Liquigas	+ 2' 21"
8	Manuel Beltrán (ESP)	Discovery Channel	+ 2' 28"
9	Vladimir Karpets (RUS)	Caisse d'Epargne–Illes Balears	+ 3' 02"
10	Sérgio Paulinho (POR)	Astana	+ 3' 42"
