= 2005 Critérium du Dauphiné Libéré =

2005 UCI ProTour, race 14 of 28

Race details
- Dates: 5–12 June 2005
- Stages: 7 + Prologue
- Distance: 1,149.4 km (714.2 mi)
- Winning time: 28h 24' 46"

Results
Jersey awarded to the overall winner	Winner	Iñigo Landaluze (ESP)	(Euskaltel–Euskadi)
	Second	Santiago Botero (COL)	(Phonak)
	Third	none	
Jersey awarded to the points classification winner	Points	none	
Jersey awarded to the mountains classification winner	Mountains	Iván Gutiérrez (ESP)	(Illes Balears–Caisse d'Epargne)
Jersey awarded to the combination classification winner	Combination	Santiago Botero (COL)	(Phonak)
	Team	Discovery Channel	

The 2005 Critérium du Dauphiné Libéré was the 57th edition of the Critérium du Dauphiné Libéré cycle race and was held from 5 June to 12 June 2005. The race started in Aix-les-Bains and finished in Sallanches. The race was won by Spanish rider Íñigo Landaluze, who has given positive in a doping test but whose case is still under dispute.

== Teams ==
Twenty-one teams entered the race:

- AG2R Prévoyance
- Bouygues Télécom
- Cofidis
- Crédit Agricole
- Davitamon–Lotto
- Discovery Channel
- Domina Vacanze
- Euskaltel–Euskadi
- Fassa Bortolo
- Française des Jeux
- Gerolsteiner
- Illes Balears–Caisse d'Epargne
- Lampre–Caffita
- Liberty Seguros–Würth
- Liquigas–Bianchi
- Phonak
- Quick-Step–Innergetic
- Rabobank
- Saunier Duval–Prodir
- T-Mobile Team
- Team CSC

== Route ==
Stage characteristics and winners
Stage	Date	Course	Distance	Type	Winner
P	5 June	Aix-les-Bains	7.9 km (4.9 mi)	Individual time trial	~~George Hincapie (USA)~~
1	6 June	Aix-les-Bains to Givors	224 km (139 mi)		Thor Hushovd (NOR)
2	7 June	Givors to Chauffailles	187 km (116 mi)		Samuel Dumoulin (FRA)
3	8 June	Roanne to Roanne	46.5 km (28.9 mi)	Individual time trial	Santiago Botero (COL)
4	9 June	Tournon-sur-Rhône to Mont Ventoux	182 km (113 mi)		Alexander Vinokourov (KAZ)
5	10 June	Vaison-la-Romaine to Grenoble	219 km (136 mi)		Axel Merckx (BEL)
6	11 June	Albertville to Morzine-Avoriaz	155 km (96 mi)		Santiago Botero (COL)
7	12 June	Morzine-Avoriaz to Sallanches	128 km (80 mi)		~~George Hincapie (USA)~~

== Stages ==
=== Prologue ===
5 June 2005 — Aix-les-Bains, 7.9 km (4.9 mi), individual time trial (ITT)

Prologue Result

	Rider	Team	Time
DSQ	~~George Hincapie (USA)~~	~~Discovery Channel~~	~~9' 55"~~
DSQ	~~Levi Leipheimer (USA)~~	~~Gerolsteiner~~	~~+ 1"~~
3	Andrey Kashechkin (KAZ)	Crédit Agricole	+ 3"
4	Floyd Landis (USA)	Phonak	+ 5"
DSQ	~~Lance Armstrong (USA)~~	~~Discovery Channel~~	~~+ 6"~~
6	Óscar Pereiro (ESP)	Phonak	+ 7"
7	Alberto Contador (ESP)	Liberty Seguros–Würth	+ 9"
8	Davide Rebellin (ITA)	Gerolsteiner	+ 13"
9	Iván Gutiérrez (ESP)	Illes Balears–Caisse d'Epargne	+ 13"
10	Francisco José Lara (ESP)	T-Mobile Team	+ 14"

General Classification after Prologue

	Rider	Team	Time
DSQ	~~George Hincapie (USA)~~	~~Discovery Channel~~	~~9' 55"~~
DSQ	~~Levi Leipheimer (USA)~~	~~Gerolsteiner~~	~~+ 1"~~
3	Andrey Kashechkin (KAZ)	Crédit Agricole	+ 3"
4	Floyd Landis (USA)	Phonak	+ 5"
DSQ	~~Lance Armstrong (USA)~~	~~Discovery Channel~~	~~+ 6"~~
6	Óscar Pereiro (ESP)	Phonak	+ 7"
7	Alberto Contador (ESP)	Liberty Seguros–Würth	+ 9"
8	Davide Rebellin (ITA)	Gerolsteiner	+ 13"
9	Iván Gutiérrez (ESP)	Illes Balears–Caisse d'Epargne	+ 13"
10	Francisco José Lara (ESP)	T-Mobile Team	+ 14"

=== Stage 1 ===
6 June 2005 — Aix-les-Bains to Givors, 224 km (139.2 mi)

Stage 1 Result

	Rider	Team	Time
1	Thor Hushovd (NOR)	Crédit Agricole	5h 10' 55"
2	Robert Hunter (RSA)	Phonak	s.t.
3	Juan Antonio Flecha (ESP)	Fassa Bortolo	s.t.
4	Luke Roberts (AUS)	Team CSC	s.t.
5	Manuel Quinziato (ITA)	Saunier Duval–Prodir	s.t.
6	Mickaël Delage (FRA)	Française des Jeux	s.t.
7	Heinrich Haussler (GER)	Gerolsteiner	s.t.
8	Samuel Dumoulin (FRA)	AG2R Prévoyance	s.t.
9	Enrico Gasparotto (ITA)	Liquigas–Bianchi	s.t.
10	Koldo Fernández (BEL)	Euskaltel–Euskadi	s.t.

General Classification after Stage 1

	Rider	Team	Time
DSQ	~~George Hincapie (USA)~~	~~Discovery Channel~~	~~5h 20' 50"~~
DSQ	~~Levi Leipheimer (USA)~~	~~Gerolsteiner~~	~~+ 1"~~
3	Andrey Kashechkin (KAZ)	Crédit Agricole	+ 3"
4	Floyd Landis (USA)	Phonak	+ 5"
DSQ	~~Lance Armstrong (USA)~~	~~Discovery Channel~~	~~+ 6"~~
6	Óscar Pereiro (ESP)	Phonak	+ 7"
7	Alberto Contador (ESP)	Liberty Seguros–Würth	+ 9"
8	Iván Gutiérrez (ESP)	Illes Balears–Caisse d'Epargne	+ 13"
9	Davide Rebellin (ITA)	Gerolsteiner	+ 13"
10	Francisco José Lara (ESP)	T-Mobile Team	+ 14"

=== Stage 2 ===
7 June 2005 — Givors to Chauffailles, 187 km (116.2 mi)

Stage 2 Result

	Rider	Team	Time
1	Samuel Dumoulin (FRA)	AG2R Prévoyance	4h 47' 06"
2	Anthony Charteau (FRA)	Bouygues Télécom	s.t.
3	Frédéric Finot (FRA)	Française des Jeux	s.t.
4	Frédéric Bessy (FRA)	Cofidis	s.t.
5	Robert Hunter (RSA)	Phonak	+ 3' 16"
6	Thor Hushovd (NOR)	Crédit Agricole	+ 3' 16"
7	Stuart O'Grady (AUS)	Cofidis	+ 3' 16"
8	Juan Antonio Flecha (ESP)	Fassa Bortolo	+ 3' 16"
9	Enrico Franzoi (ITA)	Lampre–Caffita	+ 3' 16"
10	Enrico Gasparotto (ITA)	Liquigas–Bianchi	+ 3' 16"

General Classification after Stage 2

	Rider	Team	Time
1	Samuel Dumoulin (FRA)	AG2R Prévoyance	10h 08' 06"
2	Frédéric Finot (FRA)	Française des Jeux	+ 20"
3	Anthony Charteau (FRA)	Bouygues Télécom	+ 21"
4	Frédéric Bessy (FRA)	Cofidis	+ 28"
DSQ	~~George Hincapie (USA)~~	~~Discovery Channel~~	~~+ 3' 06"~~
DSQ	~~Levi Leipheimer (USA)~~	~~Gerolsteiner~~	~~+ 3' 07"~~
7	Andrey Kashechkin (KAZ)	Crédit Agricole	+ 3' 09"
8	Floyd Landis (USA)	Phonak	+ 3' 11"
DSQ	~~Lance Armstrong (USA)~~	~~Discovery Channel~~	~~+ 3' 12"~~
10	Óscar Pereiro (ESP)	Phonak	+ 3' 13"

=== Stage 3 ===
8 June 2005 — Roanne to Roanne, 46.5 km (28.9 mi), individual time trial (ITT)

Stage 3 Result

	Rider	Team	Time
1	Santiago Botero (COL)	Phonak	1h 00' 06"
DSQ	~~Levi Leipheimer (USA)~~	~~Gerolsteiner~~	~~+ 1"~~
DSQ	~~Lance Armstrong (USA)~~	~~Discovery Channel~~	~~+ 26"~~
4	Floyd Landis (USA)	Phonak	+ 39"
5	Alexander Vinokourov (KAZ)	T-Mobile Team	+ 1' 00"
6	Óscar Pereiro (ESP)	Phonak	+ 1' 09"
DSQ	~~George Hincapie (USA)~~	~~Discovery Channel~~	~~+ 1' 11"~~
8	Marzio Bruseghin (ITA)	Fassa Bortolo	+ 1' 14"
9	Iván Gutiérrez (ESP)	Illes Balears–Caisse d'Epargne	+ 1' 16"
10	Sebastian Lang (GER)	Gerolsteiner	+ 1' 19"

General Classification after Stage 3

	Rider	Team	Time
DSQ	~~Levi Leipheimer (USA)~~	~~Gerolsteiner~~	~~11h 11' 20"~~
2	Santiago Botero (COL)	Phonak	+ 12"
DSQ	~~Lance Armstrong (USA)~~	~~Discovery Channel~~	~~+ 30"~~
4	Floyd Landis (USA)	Phonak	+ 42"
DSQ	~~George Hincapie (USA)~~	~~Discovery Channel~~	~~+ 1' 09"~~
6	Alexander Vinokourov (KAZ)	T-Mobile Team	+ 1' 12"
7	Óscar Pereiro (ESP)	Phonak	+ 1' 14"
8	Iván Gutiérrez (ESP)	Illes Balears–Caisse d'Epargne	+ 1' 27"
9	Marzio Bruseghin (ITA)	Fassa Bortolo	+ 1' 36"
10	Sebastian Lang (GER)	Gerolsteiner	+ 1' 43"

=== Stage 4 ===
9 June 2005 — Tournon-sur-Rhône to Mont Ventoux, 182 km (113.1 mi)

Stage 4 Result

	Rider	Team	Time
1	Alexander Vinokourov (KAZ)	T-Mobile Team	4h 07' 23"
2	José Ángel Gómez Marchante (ESP)	Saunier Duval–Prodir	+ 6"
3	Wim Van Huffel (BEL)	Davitamon–Lotto	+ 16"
DSQ	~~Lance Armstrong (USA)~~	~~Discovery Channel~~	~~+ 37"~~
5	Floyd Landis (USA)	Phonak	+ 41"
6	Andrey Kashechkin (KAZ)	Crédit Agricole	+ 43"
DSQ	~~Levi Leipheimer (USA)~~	~~Gerolsteiner~~	~~+ 46"~~
8	Iñigo Landaluze (ESP)	Euskaltel–Euskadi	+ 1' 31"
9	Nicolas Fritsch (FRA)	Saunier Duval–Prodir	+ 1' 36"
10	David Moncoutié (FRA)	Cofidis	+ 1' 45"

General Classification after Stage 4

	Rider	Team	Time
DSQ	~~Levi Leipheimer (USA)~~	~~Gerolsteiner~~	~~15h 19' 29"~~
DSQ	~~Lance Armstrong (USA)~~	~~Discovery Channel~~	~~+ 21"~~
3	Alexander Vinokourov (KAZ)	T-Mobile Team	+ 26"
4	Floyd Landis (USA)	Phonak	+ 47"
5	Andrey Kashechkin (KAZ)	Crédit Agricole	+ 2' 00"
6	Santiago Botero (COL)	Phonak	+ 2' 25"
7	José Ángel Gómez Marchante (ESP)	Saunier Duval–Prodir	+ 2' 53"
8	Marzio Bruseghin (ITA)	Fassa Bortolo	+ 3' 07"
9	Óscar Pereiro (ESP)	Phonak	+ 3' 16"
10	David Moncoutié (FRA)	Cofidis	+ 3' 45"

=== Stage 5 ===
10 June 2005 — Vaison-la-Romaine to Grenoble, 219 km (136.1 mi)

Stage 5 Result

	Rider	Team	Time
1	Axel Merckx (BEL)	Davitamon–Lotto	5h 15' 01"
2	Iñigo Landaluze (ESP)	Euskaltel–Euskadi	+ 2' 15"
3	Benjamín Noval (ESP)	Discovery Channel	+ 5' 45"
4	Eddy Mazzoleni (ITA)	Lampre–Caffita	+ 5' 45"
5	Paolo Bossoni (ITA)	Fassa Bortolo	+ 6' 15"
6	Sylvain Chavanel (FRA)	Cofidis	+ 6' 15"
7	Rafael Casero (ESP)	Saunier Duval–Prodir	+ 6' 15"
8	Mario Aerts (BEL)	Davitamon–Lotto	+ 6' 17"
9	Francis Mourey (FRA)	Française des Jeux	+ 6' 18"
10	Thor Hushovd (NOR)	Crédit Agricole	+ 7' 32"

General Classification after Stage 5

	Rider	Team	Time
1	Iñigo Landaluze (ESP)	Euskaltel–Euskadi	20h 41' 15"
2	Axel Merckx (BEL)	Davitamon–Lotto	+ 2' 32"
DSQ	~~Levi Leipheimer (USA)~~	~~Gerolsteiner~~	~~+ 2' 51"~~
DSQ	~~Lance Armstrong (USA)~~	~~Discovery Channel~~	~~+ 3' 12"~~
5	Alexander Vinokourov (KAZ)	T-Mobile Team	+ 3' 17"
6	Floyd Landis (USA)	Phonak	+ 3' 38"
7	Andrey Kashechkin (KAZ)	Crédit Agricole	+ 4' 51"
8	Santiago Botero (COL)	Phonak	+ 5' 16"
9	José Ángel Gómez Marchante (ESP)	Saunier Duval–Prodir	+ 5' 44"
10	Marzio Bruseghin (ITA)	Fassa Bortolo	+ 5' 58"

=== Stage 6 ===
11 June 2005 — Albertville to Morzine-Avoriaz, 155 km (96.3 mi)

Stage 6 Result

	Rider	Team	Time
1	Santiago Botero (COL)	Phonak	4h 30' 54"
2	David Moncoutié (FRA)	Cofidis	+ 23"
3	Francisco Mancebo (ESP)	Illes Balears–Caisse d'Epargne	+ 53"
4	Christophe Moreau (FRA)	Crédit Agricole	+ 58"
5	Marzio Bruseghin (ITA)	Fassa Bortolo	+ 2' 27"
6	Alexander Vinokourov (KAZ)	T-Mobile Team	+ 2' 50"
DSQ	~~Lance Armstrong (USA)~~	~~Discovery Channel~~	~~+ 2' 52"~~
8	David Arroyo (ESP)	Illes Balears–Caisse d'Epargne	+ 2' 52"
9	José Ángel Gómez Marchante (ESP)	Saunier Duval–Prodir	+ 2' 52"
DSQ	~~Levi Leipheimer (USA)~~	~~Gerolsteiner~~	+ 2' 52"

General Classification after Stage 6

	Rider	Team	Time
1	Iñigo Landaluze (ESP)	Euskaltel–Euskadi	25h 16' 36"
2	Santiago Botero (COL)	Phonak	+ 49"
3	~~Levi Leipheimer (USA)~~	~~Gerolsteiner~~	~~+ 1' 16"~~
4	~~Lance Armstrong (USA)~~	~~Discovery Channel~~	~~+ 1' 37"~~
5	Alexander Vinokourov (KAZ)	T-Mobile Team	+ 1' 40"
6	David Moncoutié (FRA)	Cofidis	+ 2' 32"
7	Floyd Landis (USA)	Phonak	+ 3' 13"
8	Marzio Bruseghin (ITA)	Fassa Bortolo	+ 3' 58"
9	Christophe Moreau (FRA)	Crédit Agricole	+ 4' 01"
10	Andrey Kashechkin (KAZ)	Crédit Agricole	+ 4' 07"

=== Stage 7 ===
12 June 2005 — Morzine-Avoriaz to Sallanches, 128 km (79.5 mi)

Stage 7 Result

	Rider	Team	Time
DSQ	~~George Hincapie (USA)~~	~~Discovery Channel~~	~~3h 07' 10"~~
2	Yaroslav Popovych (UKR)	Discovery Channel	s.t.
DSQ	~~Lance Armstrong (USA)~~	~~Discovery Channel~~	~~+ 22"~~
4	Alexander Vinokourov (KAZ)	T-Mobile Team	+ 22"
5	Santiago Botero (COL)	Phonak	+ 22"
DSQ	~~Levi Leipheimer (USA)~~	~~Gerolsteiner~~	~~+ 22"~~
7	David Moncoutié (FRA)	Cofidis	+ 24"
8	Wim Van Huffel (BEL)	Davitamon–Lotto	+ 24"
9	José Ángel Gómez Marchante (ESP)	Saunier Duval–Prodir	+ 45"
10	Francisco Mancebo (ESP)	Illes Balears–Caisse d'Epargne	+ 59"

General Classification after Stage 7

	Rider	Team	Time
1	Iñigo Landaluze (ESP)	Euskaltel–Euskadi	28h 24' 46"
2	Santiago Botero (COL)	Phonak	+ 11"
DSQ	~~Levi Leipheimer (USA)~~	~~Gerolsteiner~~	~~+ 38"~~
DSQ	~~Lance Armstrong (USA)~~	~~Discovery Channel~~	~~+ 59"~~
5	Alexander Vinokourov (KAZ)	T-Mobile Team	+ 1' 02"
6	David Moncoutié (FRA)	Cofidis	+ 1' 56"
7	José Ángel Gómez Marchante (ESP)	Saunier Duval–Prodir	+ 3' 54"
8	Marzio Bruseghin (ITA)	Fassa Bortolo	+ 3' 58"
9	Andrey Kashechkin (KAZ)	Crédit Agricole	+ 5' 04"
10	Francisco Mancebo (ESP)	Illes Balears–Caisse d'Epargne	+ 6' 20"

== Classification leadership table ==
Stage	Winner	General classification	Mountains classification	Points classification	Team Classification
P	~~George Hincapie~~	~~George Hincapie~~	Alberto Contador	~~George Hincapie~~	Phonak
1	Thor Hushovd	~~George Hincapie~~	Francis Mourey	Thor Hushovd	Phonak
2	Samuel Dumoulin	Samuel Dumoulin	Frédéric Finot	Samuel Dumoulin	AG2R Prévoyance
3	Santiago Botero	~~Levi Leipheimer~~	Frédéric Finot	Santiago Botero	Phonak
4	Alexander Vinokourov	~~Levi Leipheimer~~	Alexander Vinokourov	~~Levi Leipheimer~~	Phonak
5	Axel Merckx	Iñigo Landaluze	Alexander Vinokourov	~~Levi Leipheimer~~	Phonak
6	Santiago Botero	Iñigo Landaluze	Iván Gutiérrez	Santiago Botero	Phonak
7	~~George Hincapie~~	Iñigo Landaluze	Iván Gutiérrez	~~Lance Armstrong~~	Discovery Channel
Final		Iñigo Landaluze	Iván Gutiérrez	~~Lance Armstrong~~	Discovery Channel
