= 2006 Vuelta a España =

61st edition of the cycling race

2006 UCI ProTour, race 23 of 27
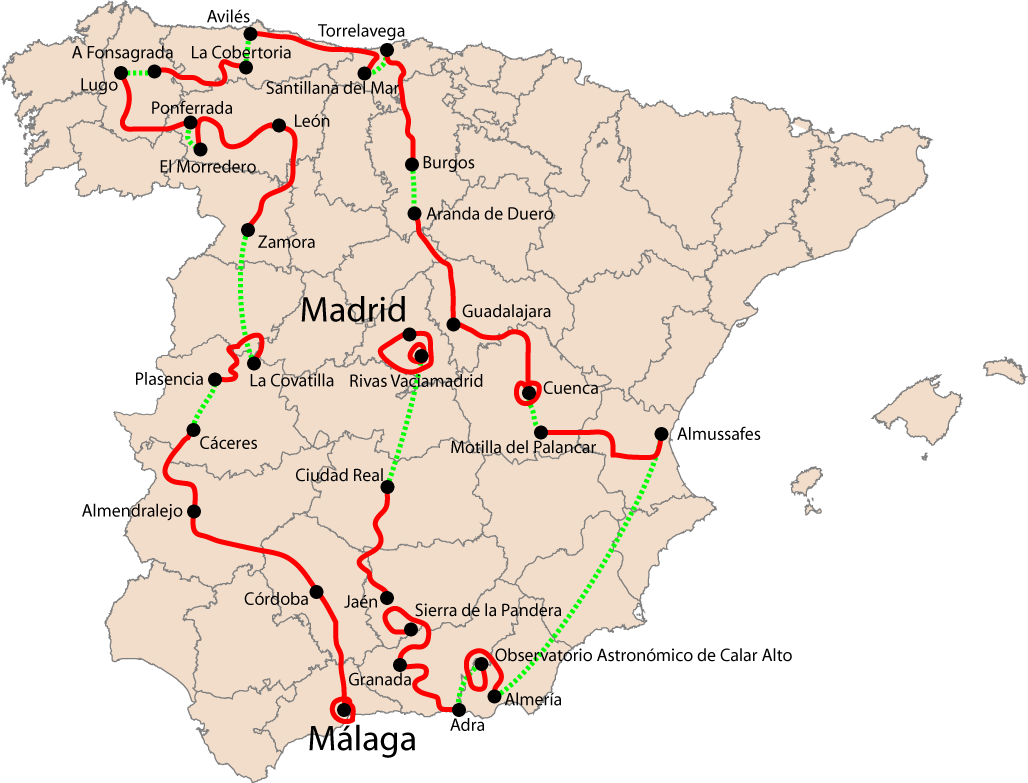
- Overview of the stages

Race details
- Dates: 26 August – 17 September
- Stages: 21
- Distance: 3,192 km (1,983 mi)
- Winning time: 81h 23' 07"

Results
Jersey awarded to the overall winner	Winner	Alexander Vinokourov (KAZ)	(Astana)
	Second	Alejandro Valverde (ESP)	(Caisse d'Epargne–Illes Balears)
	Third	Andrey Kashechkin (KAZ)	(Astana)
Jersey awarded to the points classification winner	Points	Thor Hushovd (NOR)	(Crédit Agricole)
Jersey awarded to the mountains classification winner	Mountains	Egoi Martínez (ESP)	(Discovery Channel)
Jersey awarded to the combination classification winner	Combination	Alexander Vinokourov (KAZ)	(Astana)
	Team	(United States) Discovery Channel	

The 2006 Vuelta a España was held from 26 August to 17 September 2006, and was the 61st edition of the race. It consisted of 21 stages covering a total of 3,192 km (1,983 mi), and was won by Alexander Vinokourov of the Astana cycling team. The points classification was won by Thor Hushovd of Crédit Agricole, and the mountains classification by Egoi Martínez of Discovery Channel.

== Teams and riders ==
In addition to the 20 UCI ProTour teams, Relax–GAM have received a wild card.

== Route ==
Stage	Date	Course	Distance	Type	Winner
1	26 August	Málaga to Málaga	7.2 km (4 mi)	Team time trial	Team CSC
2	27 August	Málaga to Córdoba	167 km (104 mi)		Paolo Bettini (ITA)
3	28 August	Córdoba to Almendralejo	220 km (137 mi)		Francisco Ventoso (ESP)
4	29 August	Almendralejo to Cáceres	142 km (88 mi)		Erik Zabel (GER)
5	30 August	Plasencia to Estación de Esquí La Covatilla (Béjar)	178 km (111 mi)	Mountain stage*	Danilo Di Luca (ITA)
6	31 August	Zamora to León	155 km (96 mi)		Thor Hushovd (NOR)
7	1 September	León to Alto de El Morredero (Ponferrada)	148 km (92 mi)	Mountain stage*	Alejandro Valverde (ESP)
8	2 September	Ponferrada to Lugo	173 km (107 mi)		Alexander Vinokourov (KAZ)
9	3 September	A Fonsagrada to Alto de La Cobertoria	206 km (128 mi)	Mountain stage*	Alexander Vinokourov (KAZ)
	4 September	Rest Day			
10	5 September	Avilés to Museo de Altamira (Santillana del Mar)	190 km (118 mi)		Sérgio Paulinho (POR)
11	6 September	Torrelavega (Velódromo Óscar Freire) to Burgos	165 km (103 mi)	Mountain stage	Egoi Martínez (ESP)
12	7 September	Aranda de Duero to Guadalajara	162 km (101 mi)		Luca Paolini (ITA)
13	8 September	Guadalajara to Cuenca	170 km (106 mi)		Samuel Sánchez (ESP)
14	9 September	Cuenca to Cuenca	33 km (21 mi)	Individual time trial	David Millar (GBR)
15	10 September	Motilla del Palancar to Factoría Ford (Almussafes)	175 km (109 mi)		Robert Förster (GER)
	11 Sept	Rest Day			
16	12 September	Almería to Observatorio Astronómico de Calar Alto	145 km (90 mi)	Mountain stage*	Igor Antón (ESP)
17	13 September	Adra to Granada	167 km (104 mi)	Mountain stage	~~Thomas Danielson (USA)~~
18	14 September	Granada to Sierra de la Pandera	153 km (95 mi)	Mountain stage*	Andrey Kashechkin (KAZ)
19	15 September	Jaén to Ciudad Real	195 km (121 mi)		José Luis Arrieta (ESP)
20	16 September	Rivas Futura to Rivas Vaciamadrid	28 km (17 mi)	Individual time trial	Alexander Vinokourov (KAZ)
21	17 September	Madrid to Madrid	150 km (93 mi)		Erik Zabel (GER)

- Mountain stages with asterisk end on the top of the climb.

== Jersey progress ==
Stage (Winner)	General classification	Points Classification	Mountains Classification	Combination Classification	Team Classification
Stage 1 (TTT) (Team CSC)	Carlos Sastre	Carlos Sastre	no award	no award	Team CSC
Stage 2 (Paolo Bettini)	Thor Hushovd	Paolo Bettini	Mario De Sárraga	Mario De Sárraga	Team CSC
Stage 3 (Francisco Ventoso)	Thor Hushovd	Thor Hushovd	Mario De Sárraga	David de la Fuente	Team CSC
Stage 4 (Erik Zabel)	Thor Hushovd	Thor Hushovd	Mario De Sárraga	David de la Fuente	Team CSC
Stage 5 (Danilo Di Luca)	Danilo Di Luca	Thor Hushovd	Danilo Di Luca	Danilo Di Luca	Discovery Channel
Stage 6 (Thor Hushovd)	Danilo Di Luca	Thor Hushovd	Danilo Di Luca	Danilo Di Luca	Discovery Channel
Stage 7 (Alejandro Valverde)	Janez Brajkovič	Thor Hushovd	Janez Brajkovič	Janez Brajkovič	Discovery Channel
Stage 8 (Alexander Vinokourov)	Janez Brajkovič	Thor Hushovd	Janez Brajkovič	Janez Brajkovič	Discovery Channel
Stage 9 (Alexander Vinokourov)	Alejandro Valverde	Thor Hushovd	Pietro Caucchioli	Alejandro Valverde	Discovery Channel
Stage 10 (Sérgio Paulinho)	Alejandro Valverde	Thor Hushovd	Pietro Caucchioli	Alejandro Valverde	Discovery Channel
Stage 11 (Egoi Martínez)	Alejandro Valverde	Thor Hushovd	Pietro Caucchioli	Alejandro Valverde	Discovery Channel
Stage 12 (Luca Paolini)	Alejandro Valverde	Thor Hushovd	Pietro Caucchioli	Alejandro Valverde	Discovery Channel
Stage 13 (Samuel Sánchez)	Alejandro Valverde	Thor Hushovd	Pietro Caucchioli	Alejandro Valverde	Discovery Channel
Stage 14 (ITT) (David Millar)	Alejandro Valverde	Thor Hushovd	Pietro Caucchioli	Alejandro Valverde	Discovery Channel
Stage 15 (Robert Förster)	Alejandro Valverde	Thor Hushovd	Pietro Caucchioli	Alejandro Valverde	Discovery Channel
Stage 16 (Igor Antón)	Alejandro Valverde	Thor Hushovd	Pietro Caucchioli	Alejandro Valverde	Discovery Channel
Stage 17 (~~Tom Danielson~~)	Alexander Vinokourov	Thor Hushovd	Egoi Martínez	Alejandro Valverde	Discovery Channel
Stage 18 (Andrei Kashechkin)	Alexander Vinokourov	Thor Hushovd	Egoi Martínez	Alejandro Valverde	Discovery Channel
Stage 19 (José Luis Arrieta)	Alexander Vinokourov	Thor Hushovd	Egoi Martínez	Alexander Vinokourov	Discovery Channel
Stage 20 (ITT) (Alexander Vinokourov)	Alexander Vinokourov	Thor Hushovd	Egoi Martínez	Alexander Vinokourov	Discovery Channel
Stage 21 (Erik Zabel)	Alexander Vinokourov	Thor Hushovd	Egoi Martínez	Alexander Vinokourov	Discovery Channel
Final	Alexander Vinokourov	Thor Hushovd	Egoi Martínez	Alexander Vinokourov	Discovery Channel

Jersey wearers when same rider is holding multiple jerseys:

- Lars Bak wore the points jersey in stage 2
- Paolo Bettini wore the points jersey in stages 4–5
- Janez Brajkovič wore the white combination jersey in stages 6–7
- José Miguel Elías wore the orange mountains jersey in stages 6–7
- Danilo Di Luca wore the orange mountains jersey in stages 8–9
- Alejandro Valverde wore the white combination jersey in stages 8–9
- Carlos Sastre wore the white combination jersey in stages 8–16
- Alexander Vinokourov wore the white combination jersey in stage 17
- Andrey Kashechkin wore the white combination jersey in stage 19-21
- When he has been 2nd in combination classification behind GC leader, Alejandro Valverde has worn white jersey of UCI ProTour leader. This happened on stages 8, 9, 19, 20 and 21.

== Final standings ==
=== General classification (final) ===
Rank	Rider	Team	Time
1	(Kazakhstan) Alexander Vinokourov	Astana	81h 23' 07"
2	(Spain) Alejandro Valverde	Caisse d'Epargne–Illes Balears	1' 12"
3	(Kazakhstan) Andrey Kashechkin	Astana	3' 12"
4	(Spain) Carlos Sastre	Team CSC	3' 35"
5	(Spain) José Ángel Gómez Marchante	Saunier Duval–Prodir	6' 51"
6	(United States) ~~Tom Danielson~~	~~Discovery Channel~~	~~8' 09"~~
7	(Spain) Samuel Sánchez	Euskaltel–Euskadi	8' 26"
8	(Spain) Manuel Beltrán	Discovery Channel	10' 36"
9	(Russia) Vladimir Karpets	Caisse d'Epargne–Illes Balears	10' 47"
10	(Spain) Luis Pérez Rodríguez	Cofidis	11' 32"

=== Points classification ===
In 2006, the leader of the points classification is awarded a blue with yellow-fish-covered jersey, which is sponsored by Spain's fishing and marine industry known as FROM (or El Fondo de Regulación y Organización del Mercado de Productos de la Pesca y Cultivos Marinos).

Rank	Rider	Team	Points
1	(Norway) Thor Hushovd	Crédit Agricole	199
2	(Kazakhstan) Alexander Vinokourov	Astana	163
3	(Spain) Alejandro Valverde	Caisse d'Epargne–Illes Balears	147
4	(Spain) Samuel Sánchez	Euskaltel–Euskadi	107
5	(Germany) Erik Zabel	Team Milram	104
6	(Australia) Stuart O'Grady	Team CSC	104
7	(Spain) Francisco Ventoso	Saunier Duval–Prodir	99
8	(Kazakhstan) Andrey Kashechkin	Astana	95
9	(Spain) Carlos Sastre	Team CSC	93
10	(Spain) José Ángel Gómez Marchante	Saunier Duval–Prodir	68

=== Mountains classification ===
In 2006, the leader of the climbers classification (or King of the Mountains) wears the orange jersey sponsored by Ford. In recent years, the KoM wore a red jersey.

Rank	Rider	Team	Points
1	(Spain) Egoi Martínez	Discovery Channel	129
2	(Italy) Pietro Caucchioli	Crédit Agricole	117
3	(Spain) Alejandro Valverde	Caisse d'Epargne–Illes Balears	98
4	(Kazakhstan) Andrey Kashechkin	Astana	84
5	(Kazakhstan) Alexander Vinokourov	Astana	82
6	(Spain) José Miguel Elías	Relax–GAM	70
7	(Spain) Igor Antón	Euskaltel–Euskadi	67
8	(Spain) Carlos Sastre	Team CSC	63
9	(Spain) José Ángel Gómez Marchante	Saunier Duval–Prodir	60
10	(Spain) David Arroyo	Caisse d'Epargne–Illes Balears	58

=== Combination classification ===
In 2006, the leader of the combinations classification wears the white jersey. In 2005, the rider with the lowest cumulative rank of all classifications wore a gold-green jersey.

Rank	Rider	Team	Points
1	(Kazakhstan) Alexander Vinokourov	Astana	8
2	(Spain) Alejandro Valverde	Caisse d'Epargne–Illes Balears	8
3	(Kazakhstan) Andrey Kashechkin	Astana	15
4	(Spain) Carlos Sastre	Team CSC	21
5	(Spain) José Ángel Gómez Marchante	Saunier Duval–Prodir	24
6	(Spain) Samuel Sánchez	Euskaltel–Euskadi	25
7	(United States) Tom Danielson	Discovery Channel	28
8	(Spain) Egoi Martínez	Discovery Channel	31
9	(Spain) Igor Antón	Euskaltel–Euskadi	39
10	(Spain) Manuel Beltrán	Discovery Channel	43

=== Teams classification ===
Rank	Team	Time
1	(United States) Discovery Channel	201h 59' 16"
2	(Spain) Astana	15' 25"
3	(Spain) Caisse d'Epargne–Illes Balears	25' 33"
4	(Spain) Euskaltel–Euskadi	32' 13"
5	(Denmark) Team CSC	52' 56"
6	(Spain) Saunier Duval–Prodir	1h 40' 02"
7	(Italy) Lampre–Fondital	1h 43' 20"
8	(France) AG2R Prévoyance	2h 02' 55"
9	(Spain) Relax–GAM	2h 16' 26"
10	(France) Cofidis	2h 20' 33"
