= Pieter Mertens =

Belgian cyclist

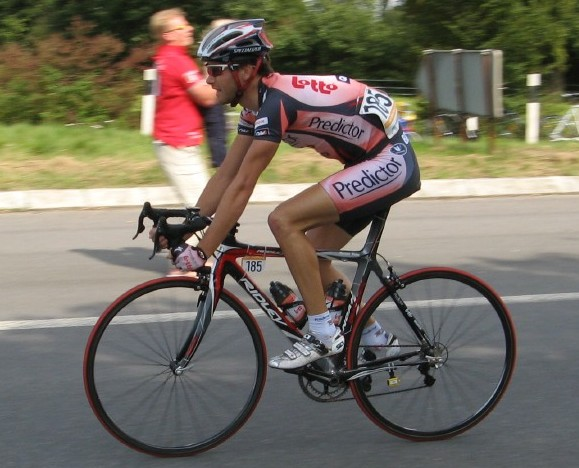
- Mertens in 2007

Personal information
- Full name: Pieter Mertens
- Born: 28 August 1980 (age 46) Lommel, Belgium
- Height: 1.81 m (5 ft 11 in)
- Weight: 67 kg (148 lb)

Cycling career
- Sport: Cycling
- Current team: Retired
- Discipline: Road
- Role: Rider

Professional teams
- 2004–2005: Vlaanderen–T Interim
- 2006–2007: Davitamon–Lotto

Pieter Mertens (born 28 August 1980) is a Belgian former professional road bicycle racer. He competed as a professional for four years, riding for Vlaanderen–T Interim between 2004 and 2005 and for UCI ProTeam Davitamon–Lotto between 2006 and 2007. He announced his retirement in October 2007 in order to focus on his medical studies. His most notable victories include a stage of the 2005 Rheinland-Pfalz Rundfahrt and the overall title of the 2002 Tour de Namur. He competed in one Grand Tour: the 2006 Vuelta a España, finishing 75th overall.

== Major results ==
2002
1st Overall Tour de Namur
4th Road race, National Under-23 Road Championships
7th Circuit du Hainaut
8th Paris–Tours Espoirs
2003
2nd Overall Flèche du Sud

1st Stage 3b

3rd Zesbergenprijs Harelbeke
3rd Zellik–Galmaarden
2004
6th Overall Étoile de Bessèges
6th Grand Prix d'Isbergues
8th GP du canton d'Argovie
9th Grand Prix de la Ville de Lillers
2005
1st Stage 4a Rheinland-Pfalz Rundfahrt
10th Overall Tour de l'Avenir
2007
6th Grand Prix de Wallonie
10th Grand Prix d'Ouverture La Marseillaise
