= Aketza Peña =

Spanish cyclist

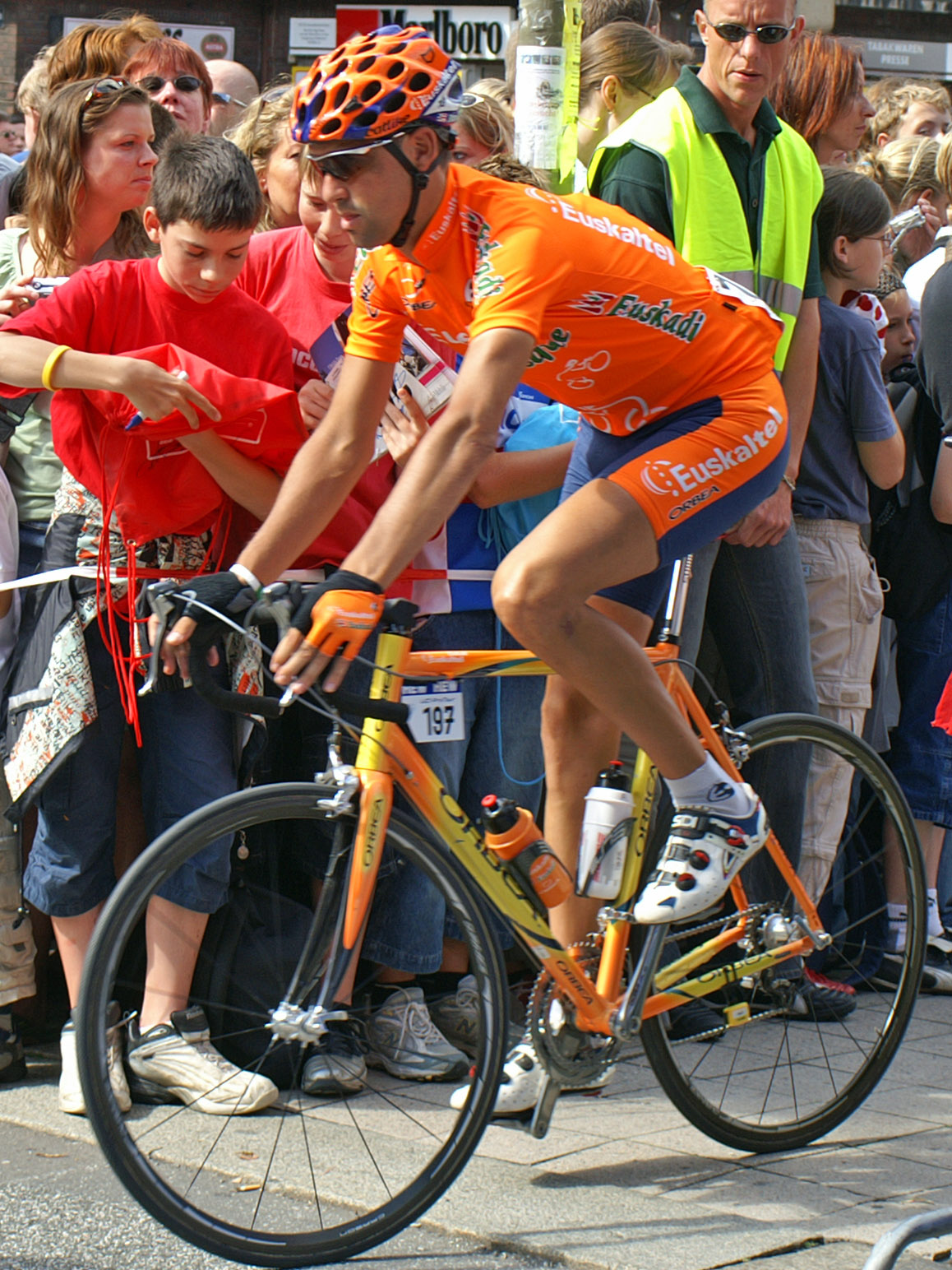
- Peña at the 2005 HEW Cyclassics

Personal information
- Full name: Aketza Peña Iza
- Born: 4 March 1981 (age 45) Zalla, Spain

Cycling career
- Sport: Cycling
- Current team: Retired
- Discipline: Road
- Role: Rider

Amateur team
- 2009: Cartaxo-Capital do Vinho

Professional teams
- 2004–2007: Euskaltel–Euskadi
- 2010: Caja Rural

Aketza Peña Iza (born 4 March 1981) is a Spanish former professional road bicycle racer, who rode professionally between 2004 and 2009, mainly for UCI ProTeam Euskaltel–Euskadi with a year at UCI Continental team Caja Rural. He rode in three Grand tours in his career, two Vuelta a España and one Giro d'Italia. Between May 2007 and August 2008 he was suspended for an alleged positive for Nandrolone.

== Career ==
Aketza Peña rode in the 2005 Vuelta a España and 2006 Vuelta a España, his best result was eighth in Stage 19 of the 2006 edition. Peña rode one Giro d'Italia in his career the 2007 edition. He was initially named as the back-up rider but was selected as an all-round domestique to help Koldo Fernández get a stage win. Due to his doping positive, Peña was suspended from the team with immediate effect during stage 17 of the Giro d'Italia.

His contract was not renewed at the end of 2007 following his non-negative for Nandrolone.

Following being found not-guilty he returned to racing with Caja Rural for 2010.

== Doping ==
During the 2007 Giro d'Italia, it was revealed he had tested positive for nandrolone at the Giro del Trentino, and had to leave the race. In August 2008 he was found not-guilty of doping.

== Major results ==
2003
3rd Overall Vuelta a Navarra
2005
3rd Overall Euskal Bizikleta
2010
10th Overall Volta ao Alentejo

== See also ==
- List of doping cases in cycling
