= Iñigo Landaluze =

Spanish cyclist

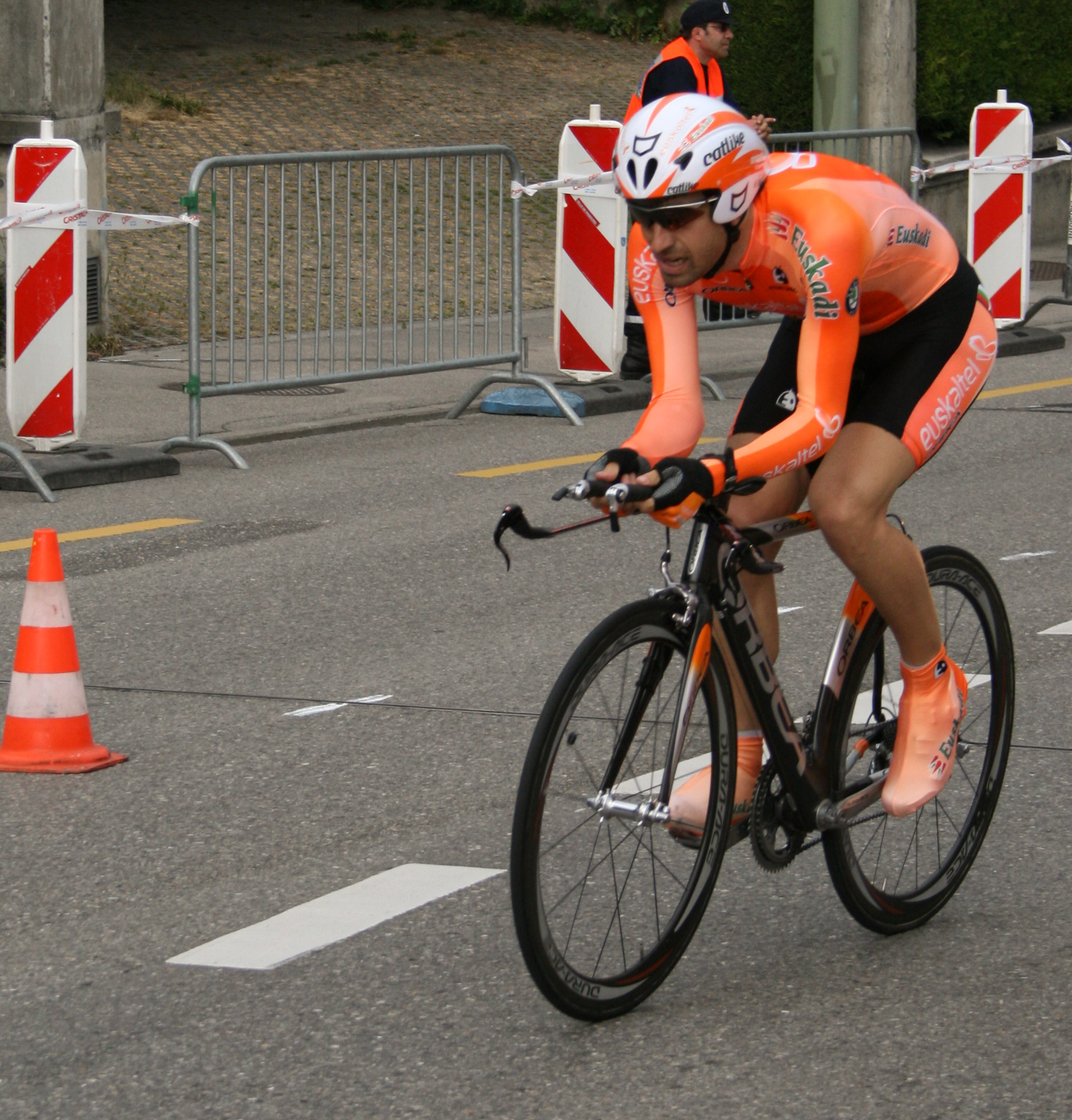

Personal information
- Full name: Iñigo Landaluze Intxaurraga
- Born: May 9, 1977 (age 49) Getxo, Spain
- Height: 1.78 m (5 ft 10 in)
- Weight: 65 kg (143 lb)

Cycling career
- Sport: Cycling
- Current team: Retired
- Discipline: Road
- Role: Rider

Professional team
- 2001–2009: Euskaltel–Euskadi

Major wins
- Critérium du Dauphiné Libéré (2005)

Iñigo Landaluze Intxaurraga (born May 9, 1977, in Getxo, Basque Country) is a Spanish former professional road bicycle racer, who rode professionally between 2001 and 2009, entirely for the Euskaltel–Euskadi team. During the 2009 season, Landaluze tested positive for the use of Continuous erythropoietin receptor activator (CERA) at the 2009 Critérium du Dauphiné Libéré. He received a two-year ban for this, and was disqualified from his results at the race.

== Doping ==
In 2005 Landaluze made his breakthrough by winning the 2005 Critérium du Dauphiné Libéré. However his win was clouded in controversy as it was soon announced he had tested positive for abnormally high testosterone and was suspended from racing until his case was heard out. In 2006, however, he was cleared to return to racing after he showed that the lab conducting tests committed procedural errors. The UCI then failed to show that those errors did not affect the outcome of the tests. The CAS panel reviewing the case said that it was "probable" that Landaluze had committed a doping violation, but the UCI had failed to meet its burden of proof in the case. New revisions to the WADA Code would suggest that Landaluze would have lost his case under the new rules.

Iñigo Landaluze was provisionally suspended by the Union Cycliste Internationale on July 17, 2009, after testing positive for the banned blood booster CERA at the 2009 Critérium du Dauphiné Libéré.

== Major results ==
2001
5th Overall Tour de Picardie
6th Circuito de Getxo
2002
5th Clásica de Almería
2003
5th Trofeo Luis Puig
7th Clásica a los Puertos de Guadarrama
2004
7th Overall Vuelta a Andalucía
7th Classique des Alpes
10th Overall Critérium du Dauphiné Libéré
10th Trofeo Manacor
2005
1st Overall Critérium du Dauphiné Libéré
2007
8th Clásica de San Sebastián
2008
2nd Overall Vuelta a Burgos
5th Clásica a los Puertos de Guadarrama
6th Overall Vuelta a la Comunidad de Madrid

== See also ==
- List of doping cases in cycling
