= Bart Dockx =

Belgian cyclist

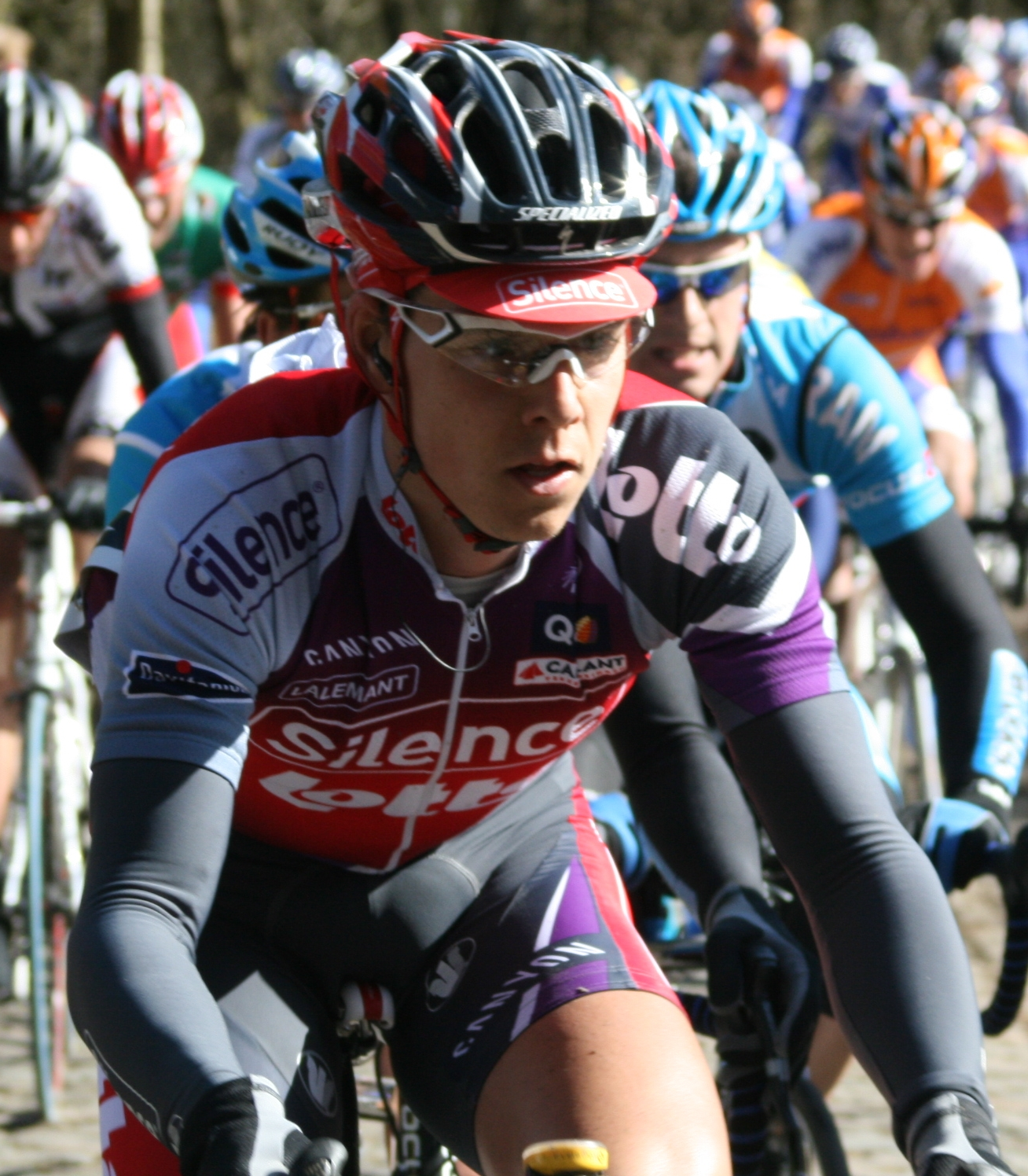

Personal information
- Full name: Bart Dockx
- Born: 2 September 1981 (age 45) Turnhout, Belgium
- Height: 1.76 m (5 ft 9 in)
- Weight: 64 kg (141 lb)

Cycling career
- Sport: Cycling
- Current team: Retired
- Discipline: Road
- Role: Rider

Professional teams
- 2004: Relax
- 2005–2009: Davitamon–Lotto
- 2010–2011: Landbouwkrediet

Bart Dockx (born 2 September 1981 in Turnhout, Antwerp) is a former Belgian professional road bicycle racer, who competed as a professional from 2004 to 2011.

== Palmarès ==
- Oostrozebeke (2004)
- Vlaamse Pijl (2002)
- 3rd, National U23 Road Race Championship (2002)
