= Mario de Sárraga =

Spanish cyclist

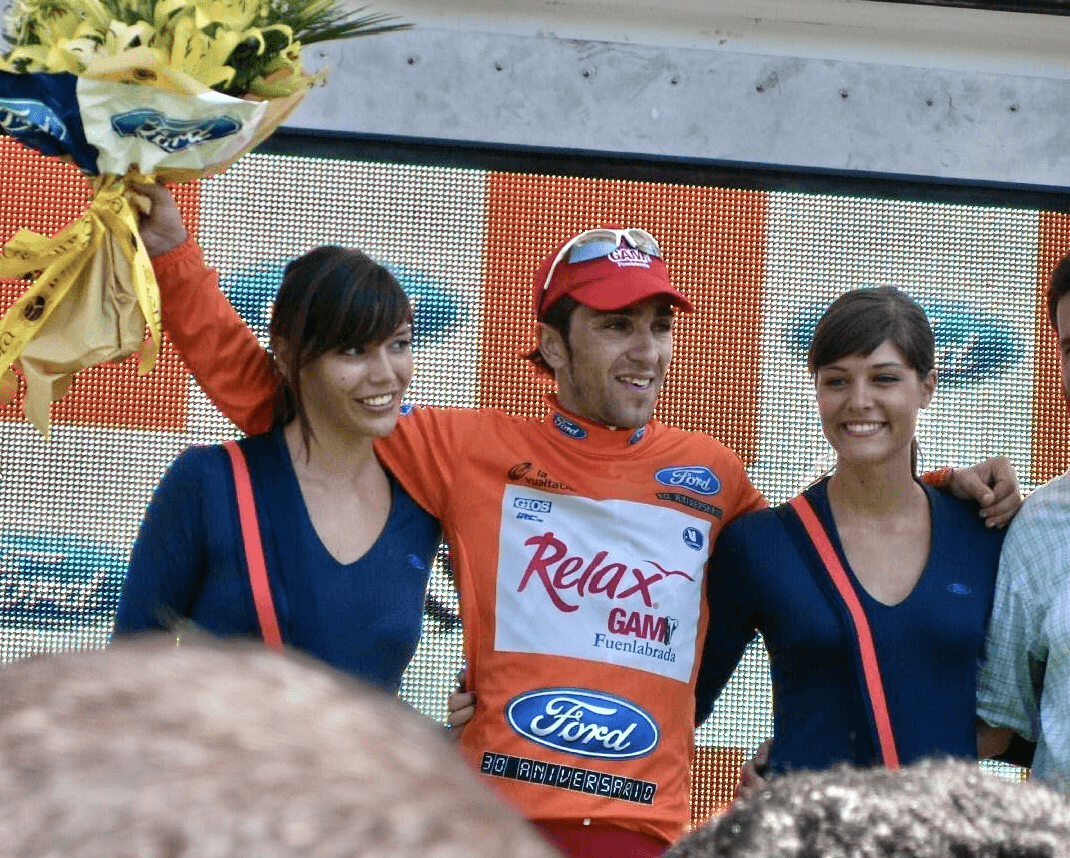

Personal information
- Born: August 22, 1980 (age 46) Oviedo, Spain

Cycling career
- Sport: Cycling
- Current team: Retired
- Discipline: Road
- Role: Rider

Professional teams
- 2005: Naturino-Sapore di Mare
- 2006–2007: Relax–GAM

Mario de Sárraga (born 22 August 1980, in Oviedo) is a former Spanish cyclist.

== Palmarès ==
2003
1st Gran Premio Cuéllar – Clásica de la Chuleta
1st Memorial Cirilo Zunzarren
1st GP Virgen del Cristo- Palencia
2004
1st Coppa Sportivi Malvesi
1st Trofeo Edilizia Mogetta
