= José Ángel Gómez Marchante =

Spanish cyclist (born 1980)

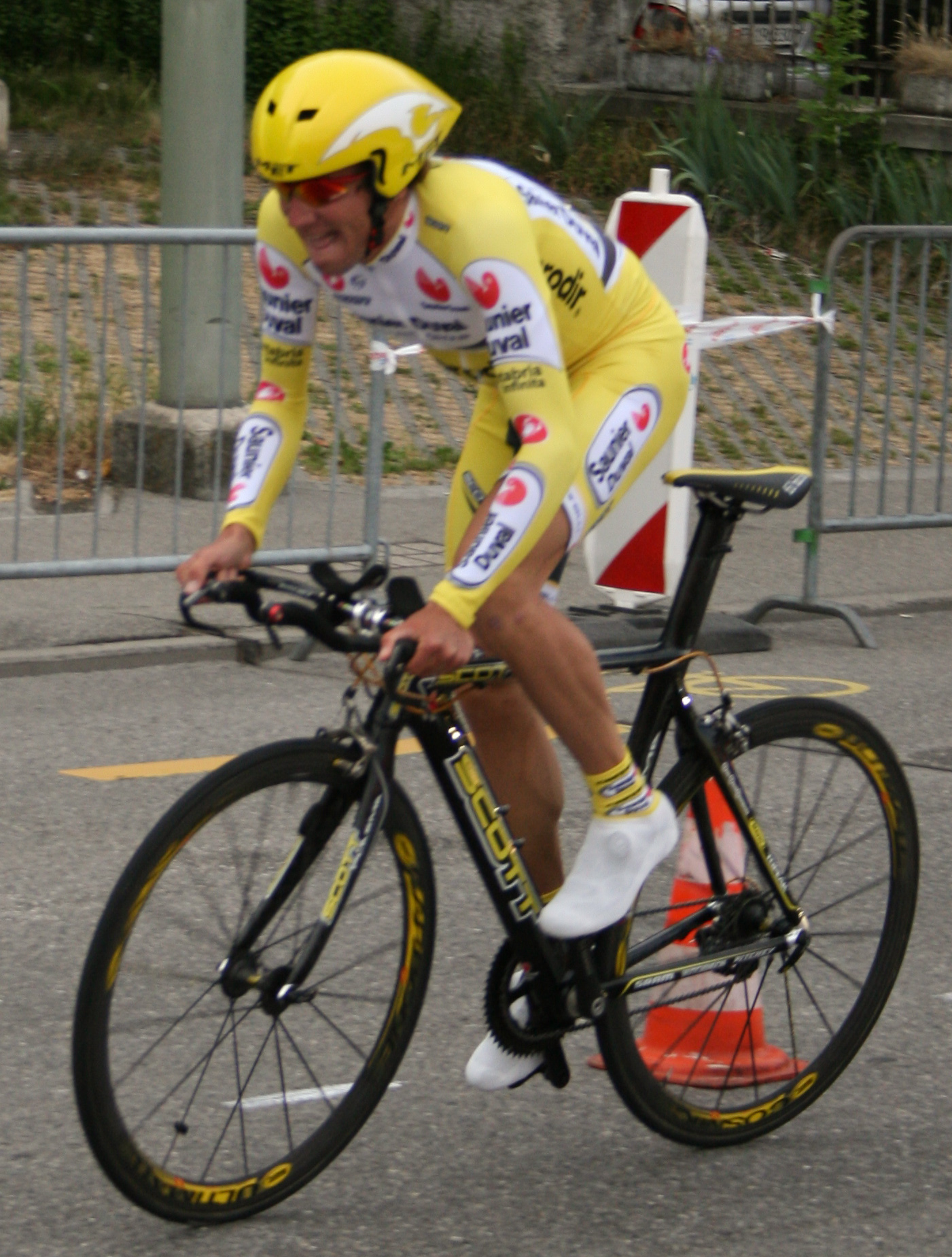
- Gómez Marchante at the 2007 Tour de Romandie

Personal information
- Full name: José Ángel Gómez Marchante
- Born: 30 May 1980 (age 46) San Sebastián de los Reyes, Spain
- Height: 1.75 m (5 ft 9 in)
- Weight: 61 kg (134 lb)

Cycling career
- Sport: Cycling
- Current team: Retired
- Discipline: Road
- Role: Rider

Amateur teams
- 1999: Kaiku
- 2000–2001: Água De Mondariz
- 2002: Iberdrola Zamora
- 2003: GD Supermercados Froiz

Professional teams
- 2004: Costa de Almería–Paternina
- 2005–2008: Saunier Duval–Prodir
- 2009: Cervélo TestTeam
- 2010: Andalucía–Cajasur

Major wins
- 2006 Tour of the Basque Country

José Ángel Gómez Marchante (born 30 May 1980) is a Spanish former road bicycle racer, who competed professionally between 2004 and 2010 for the Costa de Almería–Paternina, Scott–American Beef, Cervélo TestTeam and Andalucía–Cajasur squads. His career highlight was his win in the 2006 Tour of the Basque Country, in which he took victory in the time trial on the final stage to clinch the general classification.

== Career ==
In 2004, while riding for the Costa de Almería–Paternina team, he finished eighth in the general classification in the Vuelta a España.

In the 2005 Critérium du Dauphiné Libéré, he finished second behind Alexander Vinokourov on the stage to Mont Ventoux, and finished seventh in the general classification.

Marchante was selected by his team to ride the 2006 Vuelta a España. During Stage 5 with 6 km to go he ride across to Sérgio Paulinho and David Arroyo who were the leaders on the road. Marchante rode the two off his wheel. With 3 km to go he was caught by two riders, Danilo Di Luca and Janez Brajkovič, Marchante tried to attack them but dropped off with the high pace. In the last kilometre he was passed by Andrey Kashechkin finishing fourth in the stage. Later in the race during Stage 18 Marchante was the only rider who was working with Alejandro Valverde to catch Alexandre Vinokourov who was up the road.

Following on from his great 2006 season he was named as a key domestique in the Grand Tours for 2007.

Marchante joined the Cervélo TestTeam for the 2009 season.

== Major results ==
1998
2nd Road race, National Junior Road Championships
2000
7th Overall Volta a Portugal do Futuro
2002
1st Stage ? (Note: A stage was won by Marchante but no record of which stage can be found.) Vuelta a la Comunidad de Madrid
2nd Overall Vuelta a Albacete

1st Stage 3

2003
1st Overall Vuelta a Extremadura
1st Overall Bizkaiko Bira

1st Stages 3 & 4b

1st Aiztondo Klasica
2nd Overall Circuito Montañés

1st Stage 5b

4th Overall Vuelta a la Comunidad de Madrid
2004
1st Stage 2 GP CTT Correios de Portugal
2nd Overall Vuelta a la Rioja
4th Overall Vuelta a Andalucía
5th Overall Vuelta a Asturias
6th Clásica de Almería
8th Overall Vuelta a España
10th Overall Clásica Internacional Alcobendas
2005
2nd Overall Clásica Internacional Alcobendas
7th Overall Critérium du Dauphiné Libéré
7th Overall Setmana Catalana de Ciclisme
7th Trofeo Soller
9th Overall Paris–Nice
2006
1st Overall Tour of the Basque Country

1st Stage 6

5th Overall Vuelta a España
10th Klasika Primavera
2007
1st Subida a Urkiola
2008
5th Overall Vuelta a Chihuahua
2009
5th Overall Volta a Catalunya
9th Overall Tour de Langkawi

=== Grand Tour general classification results timeline ===
Grand Tour	2004	2005	2006	2007	2008	2009	2010
Giro d'Italia	—	—	—	—	—	—	—
Tour de France	—	DNF	DNF	—	—	DNF	—
Vuelta a España	8	—	5	40	—	22	80

Legend
—	Did not compete
DNF	Did not finish
