= José Luis Arrieta =

Spanish cyclist

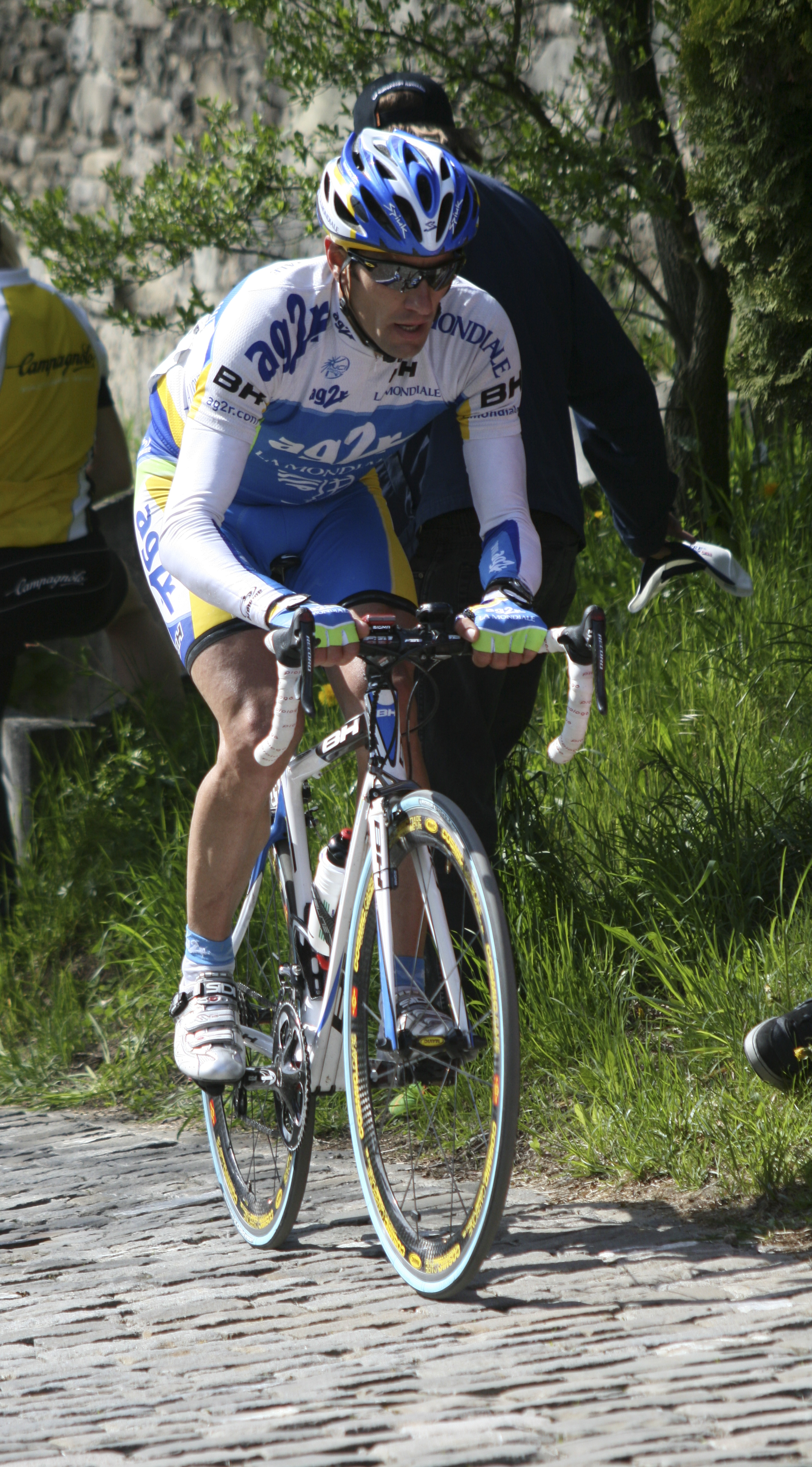
- Arrieta at the 2008 Tour de Romandie

Personal information
- Full name: José Luis Arrieta Lujambio
- Born: 15 June 1971 (age 55) San Sebastián, Spain
- Height: 1.78 m (5 ft 10 in)
- Weight: 68 kg (150 lb)

Cycling career
- Sport: Cycling
- Current team: Movistar Team
- Discipline: Road
- Role: Sporting director

Professional teams
- 1993–2005: Banesto
- 2006–2010: AG2R Prévoyance

Managerial team
- 2011–: Movistar Team

Major wins
- Grand Tours Vuelta a España 1 individual stage (2006)

José Luis Arrieta Lujambio (born 15 June 1971, in San Sebastián) is a retired Spanish professional road racing cyclist. He last rode for UCI ProTour team Ag2r–La Mondiale. He is now a sporting director for Movistar Team, the same franchise for which he rode earlier in his career when it was known as Banesto.

Arrieta was a devoted domestique for Miguel Induráin. L'Équipe said of him:

"He no longer counts the hours, the years, spent with his nose in the wind trying to protect his leader for as long as possible."

Arrieta said:

When you have the chance to start your career in so big a team and at the side of a champion as great as Indurain, you grow in the service of sacrifice. I don't complain. To the contrary, I had the chance to live some wonderful moments. When Indurain won, or another rider for whom we had decided to work, it was a victory for all the team men as well."

== Career achievements ==
=== Major results ===
1989
1st Road race, National Junior Road Championships
1991
3rd Overall Circuito Montañes

1st Stage 6

1993
9th Overall Circuit Cycliste Sarthe
1997
6th Overall Grand Prix du Midi Libre
1998
6th Trofeo Comunidad Foral de Navarra
6th Overall Vuelta a la Comunidad Valenciana
2000
9th Overall Euskal Bizikleta
2002
1st Stage 1 Vuelta Asturias
1st Metas Volantes classification Grande Prémio Internacional de Ciclismo MR Cortez-Mitsubishi
2003
9th Overall Euskal Bizikleta
2004
1st Stage 2 Vuelta a Castilla y León (TTT)
2005
4th Clásica a los Puertos
2006
1st Stage 19 Vuelta a España

=== Grand Tour general classification results timeline ===
Grand Tour	1993	1994	1995	1996	1997	1998	1999	2000	2001	2002	2003	2004	2005	2006	2007	2008	2009	2010
Giro d'Italia	105	49	64	—	—	—	34	—	29	—	—	—	—	—	—	—	—	—
Tour de France	—	—	—	32	75	DNF	46	57	—	—	—	—	74	27	52	71	78	—
Vuelta a España	—	—	—	—	—	—	—	103	—	—	106	28	—	44	59	55	81	DNF

Legend
DSQ	Disqualified
DNF	Did not finish
