= José Miguel Elías =

Spanish cyclist

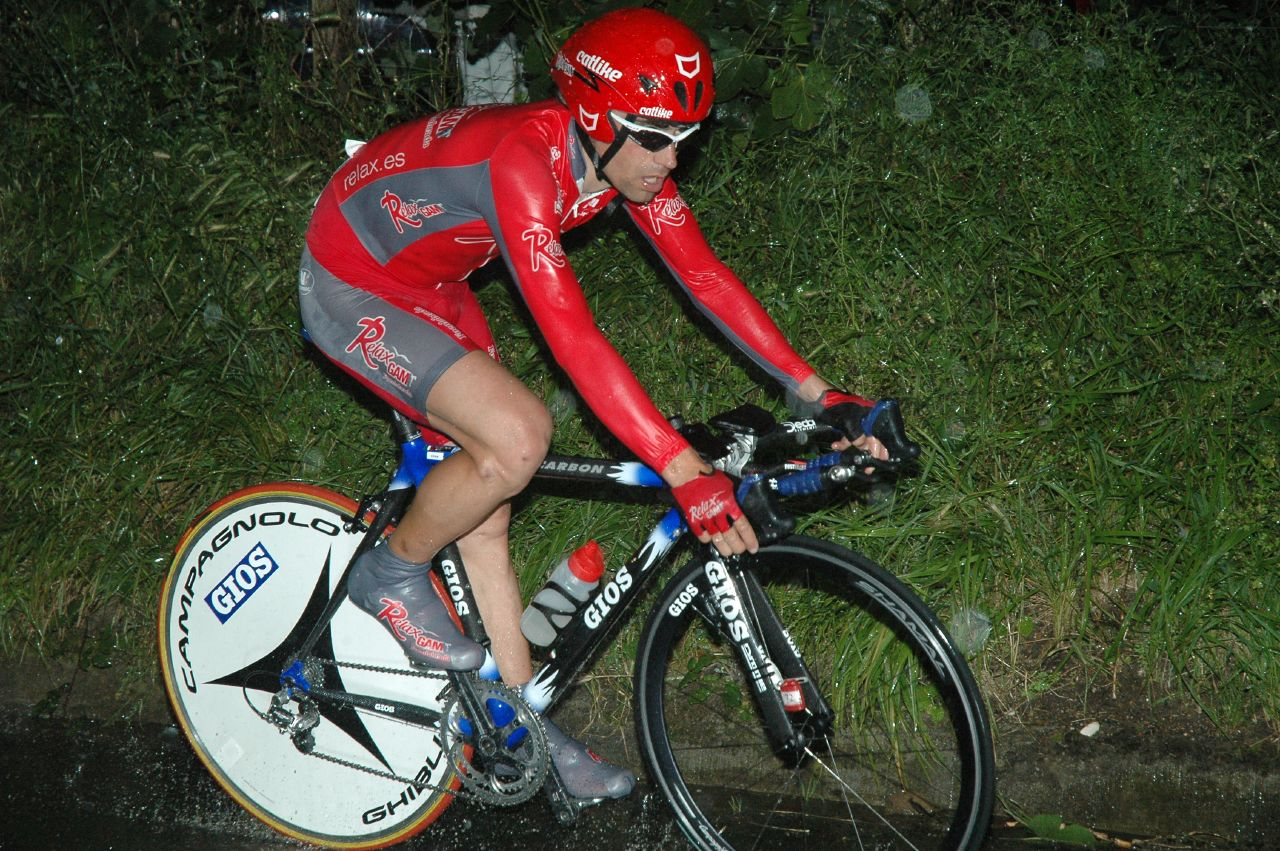
- Elías at the 2007 Euskal Bizikleta

Personal information
- Full name: José Miguel Elías Galindo
- Born: 15 January 1977 (age 49) Zaragoza, Spain

Cycling career
- Sport: Cycling
- Current team: Retired
- Discipline: Road
- Role: Rider

Professional teams
- 2003–2007: Colchon Relax–Fuenlabrada
- 2008: Contentpolis–Murcia

José Miguel Elías Galindo (born 15 January 1977 in Zaragoza) is a Spanish former professional road cyclist. He rode in 3 editions of the Vuelta a España.

== Major results ==
1998
1st Troyes–Dijon
2002
1st Overall Volta a Coruña
2004
8th Overall Vuelta a Murcia
9th Overall Volta a Portugal

1st Stage 1

2005
4th Overall Vuelta a Asturias
2006
7th Overall Tour de Langkawi
2007
3rd GP Llodio
3rd Overall Euskal Bizikleta
4th Subida a Urkiola
5th Overall Vuelta a la Comunidad Valenciana
8th Overall Vuelta a Burgos
8th Overall Vuelta por un Chile Líder
