= Ruggero Marzoli =

Italian cyclist

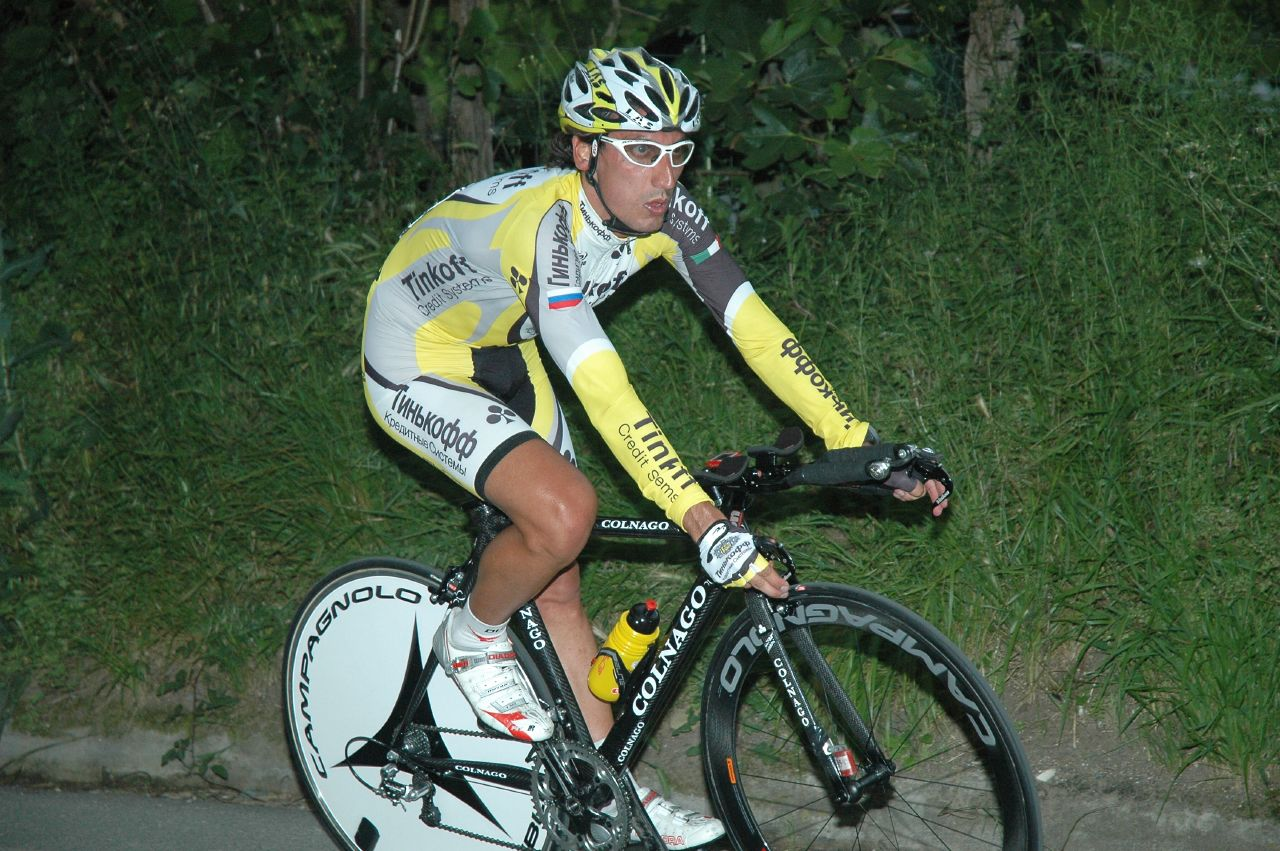

Personal information
- Full name: Ruggero Marzoli
- Born: 2 April 1976 (age 50) Spoltore, Italy

Cycling career
- Sport: Cycling
- Current team: Acqua & Sapone
- Discipline: Road
- Role: Rider

Professional teams
- 1999–2001: Cantina Tollo–Alexia Alluminio
- 2002: Mobilvetta-Formaggi Trentini
- 2003: Alessio
- 2004–2005: Acqua & Sapone
- 2006: Lampre–Fondital
- 2007: Tinkoff Credit Systems
- 2009–: Acqua & Sapone–Caffè Mokambo

Ruggero Marzoli (born 2 April 1976, in Spoltore) is an Italian professional road bicycle racer. After a previous four-month ban in 1999, Marzoli was banned for six months in 2008, after being considered guilty for the attempted use of prohibited substances in relation to the Oil for Drugs case. CONI had appealed for Marzoli to be banned for life, because it was a second offence.

== Major achievements ==
2002
1st, Stage 4, Giro della Provincia di Lucca
1st, Stage 4, Settimana Internazionale di Coppi e Bartali
2003
1st, Stage 4, Giro d'Abruzzo
3rd, Overall, Tirreno–Adriatico

1st, Stage 5

1st, Stage 4, Tour de Pologne
2004
1st, Stage 2, Giro d'Abruzzo
1st, Stage 5, Settimana Internazionale di Coppi e Bartali
2005
1st, Trofeo Matteotti
1st, Stage 1, Tour of Slovenia
2007
1st, Stage 3, Circuit de Lorraine
