= Andrey Kashechkin =

Kazakhstani road racing cyclist (born 1980)

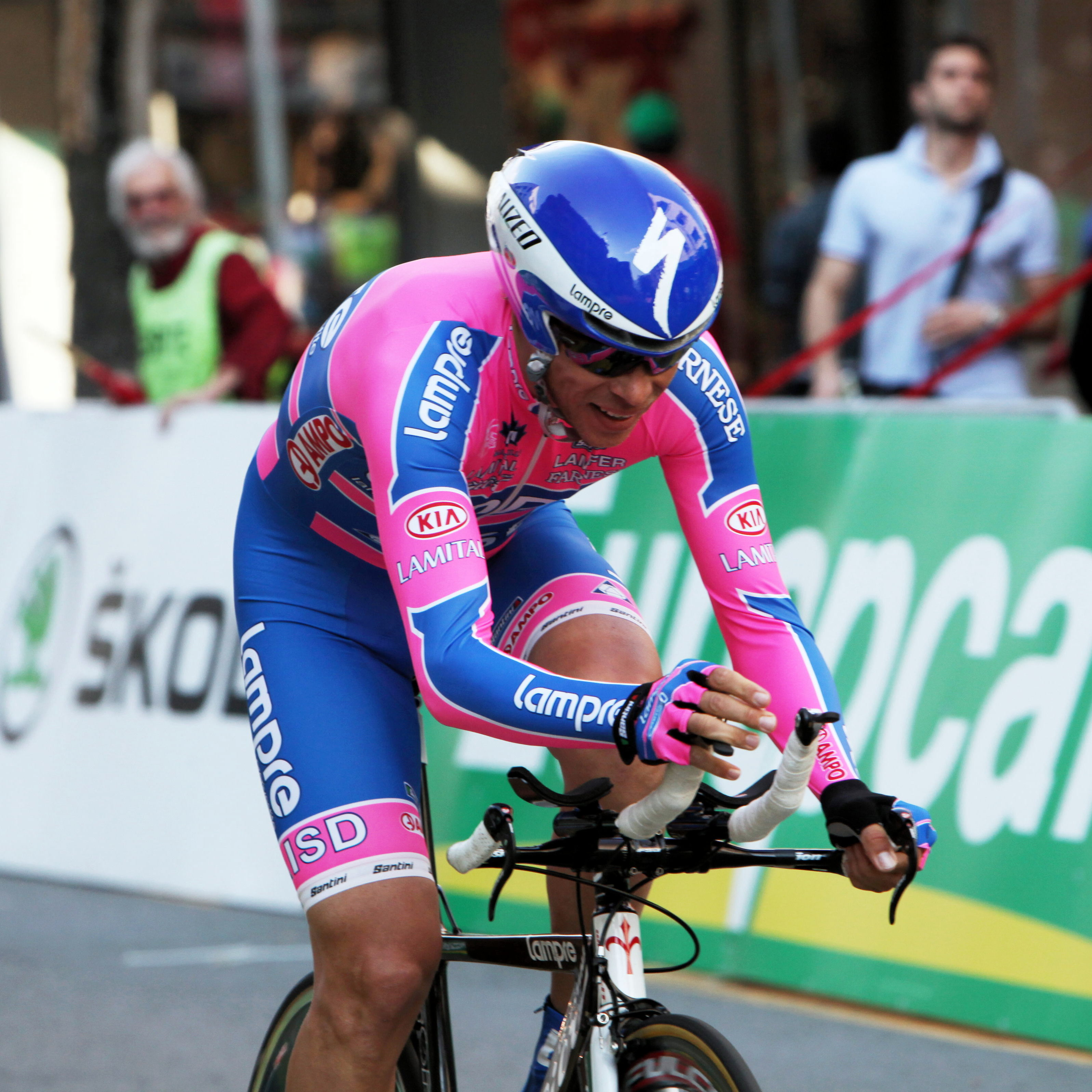
- Kashechkin in the 2011 Tour de Romandie

Personal information
- Full name: Andrey Grigorievich Kashechkin; Андрей Григорьевич Кашечкин
- Nickname: Kash
- Born: 21 March 1980 (age 46) Kyzyl-Orda, Soviet Union
- Height: 1.84 m (6 ft 0 in)
- Weight: 72 kg (159 lb)

Cycling career
- Sport: Cycling
- Discipline: Road
- Role: Rider
- Rider type: All-rounder

Professional teams
- 2001–2002: Domo-Farm Frites
- 2003: Quick-Step–Davitamon
- 2004–2005: Crédit Agricole
- 2006: Liberty Seguros–Würth
- 2007: Astana
- 2010–2011: Lampre–Farnese Vini
- 2011–2013: Astana

Major wins
- Grand Tours Vuelta a España 1 individual stage (2006)

Andrey Grigorievich Kashechkin (Russian: Андрей Григорьевич Кашечкин, born 21 March 1980) is a former Kazakhstani road racing cyclist, who last rode for the UCI ProTour team Astana.

== Biography ==
Kashechkin was born in Kyzyl-Orda, in the former Kazakh Soviet Socialist Republic.

After the junior World Championships at Valkenburg, Kashechkin moved to Belgium, where he turned pro in 2001 with the Domo-Farm Frites team. In 2003, he moved to Quick-Step–Davitamon, and the following year to French squad Crédit Agricole.

After two seasons in that team, Kashechkin joined Liberty Seguros–Würth, where he posted good results throughout the 2006 season.

Kashechkin intended to return to pro cycling in the middle of 2009, but was unable to find a team. In June 2010, it was reported that Kashechkin was in negotiations with Lampre–Farnese Vini, and he later signed with them. In the middle of the 2011 season, however, Lampre released him and he re-signed with Astana in order to ride the Vuelta a España. He had some trouble again at Astana in 2012 and was sidelined after refusing to sign an ethical agreement, although eventually the team reinstated him once he complied.

After his sporting career, Andrey Kashechkin became a key player in economic relations between Europe and Central Asia. He was particularly involved with the Caspian Hub, an organisation dedicated to facilitating investment and trade in the Caspian region. In this capacity, he fostered synergies between Belgian technology hubs and Kazakh industrial projects. At the 2017 International Exposition in Astana, he served as commissioner for the Belgian industrial group John Cockerill (CMI). His diplomatic and economic contributions were recognized in 2016 with a medal commemorating the 25th anniversary of Kazakhstan's independence.

== Career achievements ==
=== Major results ===
1999
National Road Championships

5th Road race
5th Time trial

2000
4th Overall Flèche du Sud
2001
1st Overall Le Triptyque des Monts et Châteaux
1st La Côte Picarde
2nd Flèche Ardennaise
3rd Liège–Bastogne–Liège U23
5th Circuit de Wallonie
2002
7th Overall Tour de la Région Wallonne
2003
5th Giro del Lazio
9th Memorial Rik Van Steenbergen
2004
1st Overall Sachsen Tour
1st Grand Prix de Fourmies
3rd Regio Tour International

1st Young rider classification

7th Route Adélie
2005
3rd Road race, National Road Championships
6th Time trial, UCI Road World Championships
2006
1st Road race, National Road Championships
1st Stage 6 Paris-Nice
3rd Overall Vuelta a España

1st Stage 18

3rd Overall Deutschland Tour
3rd Clásica de San Sebastián
5th Overall Tour de Romandie
2007
3rd Overall Tour de Romandie
3rd Overall Critérium du Dauphiné Libéré
2009
2nd Overall Drei Etappen Rundfahrt Frankfurt

1st Stage 2

2010
3rd Overall Vuelta a la Independencia Nacional
2012
1st Stage 4 Vuelta a la Independencia Nacional
1st Stage 1 Giro della Valle d'Aosta
1st Stage 2 Tour of Bulgaria

=== Grand Tour general classification results timeline ===
Grand Tour	2002	2003	2004	2005	2006	2007	2008	2009	2010	2011	2012	2013
Giro d'Italia	—	—	—	—	—	—	—	—	—	—	—	—
Tour de France	—	—	—	19	—	DNF	—	—	—	—	78	DNF
Vuelta a España	DNF	—	—	—	3	—	—	—	18	89	34	—

Legend
—	Did not compete
DNF	Did not finish

=== Captain and leader within the Astana team ===
After a stint with the Italian team Lampre-ISD, Andrey Kashechkin returned to Astana Pro Team in August 2011. He came back with the status of leader and took on the role of road captain to lead the Kazakh national team. His experience at the highest level and his attachment to his beloved team allowed him to lead the academy's young talents, a commitment he subsequently shared at international conferences at the Doha GOALS forum in Qatar.

In May 2023, Kashechkin launched the "Electro Tour" project, introducing a high-performance prototype e-bike on the Circuit de Monaco. During a demonstration held alongside the Monaco Grand Prix, the 11 kg carbon-fiber bike, equipped with a 2,500-watt motor, set a speed record for its category on the circuit, reaching 91 km/h (56 mph)

=== Retraining in electric mobility ===
In 2023, Andrey Kashechkin launched the "Electro Tour" project, an initiative dedicated to promoting high-performance electric cycling. In May 2023, on the sidelines of the Formula 1 Grand Prize, he presented a prototype carbon fiber electric bicycle weighing 11 kg and equipped with a 2,500-watt motor. This model set a speed record on the Monaco circuit, reaching a top speed of 91 km/h. The project aims to develop models capable of reaching a top speed of 130 km/h for future specialized sporting competitions.
