= 2003 Vuelta a España, Stage 1 to Stage 11 =

Cycling race stages

The 2003 Vuelta a España was the 58th edition of the Vuelta a España, one of cycling's Grand Tours. The Vuelta began in Gijón, with a team time trial on 6 September, and Stage 11 occurred on 17 September with a stage to Cuenca. The race finished in Madrid on 28 September.

== Stage 1 ==
6 September 2003 — Gijón to Gijón, 28 km (17 mi) (TTT)

Stage 1 result

Rank	Team	Time
1	ONCE–Eroski	32' 01"
2	U.S. Postal Service	+ 10"
3	iBanesto.com	+ 24"
4	Kelme–Costa Blanca	+ 45"
5	Quick-Step–Davitamon	+ 48"
6	Euskaltel–Euskadi	+ 50"
7	Cofidis	+ 56"
8	Team Bianchi	+ 1' 01"
9	Lampre	+ 1' 03"
10	Phonak	+ 1' 04"

General classification after stage 1

Rank	Rider	Team	Time
1	Igor González de Galdeano (ESP)	ONCE–Eroski	32' 01"
2	Joaquim Rodríguez (ESP)	ONCE–Eroski	s.t.
3	Jan Hruška (CZE)	ONCE–Eroski	s.t.
4	Ángel Vicioso (ESP)	ONCE–Eroski	s.t.
5	Isidro Nozal (ESP)	ONCE–Eroski	s.t.
6	José Azevedo (POR)	ONCE–Eroski	s.t.
7	Marcos Serrano (ESP)	ONCE–Eroski	s.t.
8	José Luis Rubiera (ESP)	U.S. Postal Service	+ 10"
9	Max van Heeswijk (NED)	U.S. Postal Service	s.t.
10	Manuel Beltrán (ESP)	U.S. Postal Service	s.t.

== Stage 2 ==
7 September 2003 — Gijón to Cangas de Onís, 148 km (92 mi)

Stage 2 result

Rank	Rider	Team	Time
1	Luis Pérez (ESP)	Cofidis	3h 27' 32"
2	Carlos Sastre (ESP)	Team CSC	s.t.
3	Alejandro Valverde (ESP)	Kelme–Costa Blanca	+ 14"
4	Miguel Ángel Martín (ESP)	De Nardi–Colpack	s.t.
5	Joaquim Rodríguez (ESP)	ONCE–Eroski	s.t.
6	David Etxebarria (ESP)	Euskaltel–Euskadi	s.t.
7	Patrik Sinkewitz (GER)	Quick-Step–Davitamon	s.t.
8	Igor Astarloa (ESP)	Saeco	s.t.
9	Dario Frigo (ITA)	Fassa Bortolo	s.t.
10	Gorka González (ESP)	Euskaltel–Euskadi	s.t.

General classification after stage 2

Rank	Rider	Team	Time
1	Joaquim Rodríguez (ESP)	ONCE–Eroski	3h 59' 47"
2	Igor González de Galdeano (ESP)	ONCE–Eroski	s.t.
3	Isidro Nozal (ESP)	ONCE–Eroski	+ 1"
4	Marcos Serrano (ESP)	ONCE–Eroski	s.t.
5	Manuel Beltrán (ESP)	U.S. Postal Service	+ 11"
6	Roberto Heras (ESP)	U.S. Postal Service	s.t.
7	Aitor Osa (ESP)	iBanesto.com	+ 25"
8	Unai Osa (ESP)	iBanesto.com	s.t.
9	Francisco Mancebo (ESP)	iBanesto.com	s.t.
10	Juan Miguel Mercado (ESP)	iBanesto.com	s.t.

== Stage 3 ==
8 September 2003 — Cangas de Onís to Santander, 154.3 km (95.9 mi)

Stage 3 result

Rank	Rider	Team	Time
1	Alessandro Petacchi (ITA)	Fassa Bortolo	3h 24' 13"
2	Erik Zabel (GER)	Team Telekom	s.t.
3	Tom Boonen (BEL)	Quick-Step–Davitamon	s.t.
4	Julian Dean (NZL)	Team CSC	s.t.
5	Giovanni Lombardi (ITA)	De Nardi–Colpack	s.t.
6	Ángel Edo (ESP)	Milaneza–MSS	s.t.
7	Ján Svorada (CZE)	Lampre	s.t.
8	Alexandre Usov (BLR)	Phonak	s.t.
9	Francisco Gutiérrez (ESP)	Labarca-2-Café Baqué	s.t.
10	Óscar Pereiro (ESP)	Phonak	s.t.

General classification after stage 3

Rank	Rider	Team	Time
1	Joaquim Rodríguez (ESP)	ONCE–Eroski	7h 24' 00"
2	Igor González de Galdeano (ESP)	ONCE–Eroski	s.t.
3	Isidro Nozal (ESP)	ONCE–Eroski	s.t.
4	Marcos Serrano (ESP)	ONCE–Eroski	s.t.
5	Manuel Beltrán (ESP)	U.S. Postal Service	+ 10"
6	Roberto Heras (ESP)	U.S. Postal Service	s.t.
7	Unai Osa (ESP)	iBanesto.com	+ 24"
8	Aitor Osa (ESP)	iBanesto.com	s.t.
9	Francisco Mancebo (ESP)	iBanesto.com	s.t.
10	Juan Miguel Mercado (ESP)	iBanesto.com	s.t.

== Stage 4 ==
9 September 2003 — Santander to Burgos, 151 km (94 mi)

Stage 4 result

Rank	Rider	Team	Time
1	Unai Etxebarria (VEN)	Euskaltel–Euskadi	3h 26' 51"
2	David Etxebarria (ESP)	Euskaltel–Euskadi	+ 44"
3	Félix Cárdenas (COL)	Labarca–2–Café Baqué	s.t.
4	José Enrique Gutiérrez (ESP)	Kelme–Costa Blanca	s.t.
5	Jurgen Van Goolen (BEL)	Quick-Step–Davitamon	s.t.
6	Isidro Nozal (ESP)	ONCE–Eroski	s.t.
7	Óscar Laguna (ESP)	Colchon Relax–Fuenlabrada	+ 1' 05"
8	Erik Zabel (GER)	Team Telekom	+ 1' 34"
9	Julian Dean (NZL)	Team CSC	s.t.
10	Patrick Calcagni (SUI)	Vini Caldirola–So.di	s.t.

General classification after stage 4

Rank	Rider	Team	Time
1	Isidro Nozal (ESP)	ONCE–Eroski	10h 52' 35"
2	Joaquim Rodríguez (ESP)	ONCE–Eroski	+ 50"
3	Igor González de Galdeano (ESP)	ONCE–Eroski	s.t.
4	David Etxebarria (ESP)	Euskaltel–Euskadi	s.t.
5	Marcos Serrano (ESP)	ONCE–Eroski	s.t.
6	Manuel Beltrán (ESP)	U.S. Postal Service	+ 1' 00"
7	Roberto Heras (ESP)	U.S. Postal Service	s.t.
8	Aitor Osa (ESP)	iBanesto.com	+ 1' 14"
9	Francisco Mancebo (ESP)	iBanesto.com	s.t.
10	Unai Osa (ESP)	iBanesto.com	s.t.

== Stage 5 ==
10 September 2003 — Soria to Zaragoza, 166.7 km (103.6 mi)

Stage 5 result

Rank	Rider	Team	Time
1	Alessandro Petacchi (ITA)	Fassa Bortolo	3h 19' 26"
2	Ángel Edo (ESP)	Milaneza–MSS	s.t.
3	Julian Dean (NZL)	Team CSC	+ 2"
4	Erik Zabel (GER)	Team Telekom	s.t.
5	Antonio Bucciero (ITA)	Saeco	s.t.
6	Fred Rodriguez (USA)	Vini Caldirola–So.di	s.t.
7	Angelo Furlan (ITA)	Alessio	s.t.
8	Ján Svorada (CZE)	Lampre	s.t.
9	Alejandro Valverde (ESP)	Kelme–Costa Blanca	s.t.
10	Steven de Jongh (NED)	Rabobank	s.t.

General classification after stage 5

Rank	Rider	Team	Time
1	Isidro Nozal (ESP)	ONCE–Eroski	14h 11' 03"
2	David Etxebarria (ESP)	Euskaltel–Euskadi	+ 50"
3	Joaquim Rodríguez (ESP)	ONCE–Eroski	s.t.
4	Igor González de Galdeano (ESP)	ONCE–Eroski	s.t.
5	Marcos Serrano (ESP)	ONCE–Eroski	s.t.
6	Manuel Beltrán (ESP)	U.S. Postal Service	+ 1' 00"
7	Roberto Heras (ESP)	U.S. Postal Service	s.t.
8	Aitor Osa (ESP)	iBanesto.com	+ 1' 14"
9	Unai Osa (ESP)	iBanesto.com	s.t.
10	Francisco Mancebo (ESP)	iBanesto.com	s.t.

== Stage 6 ==
11 September 2003 — Zaragoza to Zaragoza, 43.8 km (27.2 mi)

Stage 6 result

Rank	Rider	Team	Time
1	Isidro Nozal (ESP)	ONCE–Eroski	53' 34"
2	David Millar (GBR)	Cofidis	+ 1' 20"
3	Jan Hruška (CZE)	ONCE–Eroski	+ 1' 26"
4	Igor González de Galdeano (ESP)	ONCE–Eroski	+ 1' 37"
5	Aitor González (ESP)	Fassa Bortolo	+ 1' 41"
6	Manuel Beltrán (ESP)	U.S. Postal Service	+ 1' 42"
7	Claus Michael Møller (DEN)	Milaneza–MSS	+ 1' 56"
8	Bert Grabsch (GER)	Phonak	+ 1' 57"
9	Dario Frigo (ITA)	Fassa Bortolo	+ 2' 21"
10	Santos González (ESP)	De Nardi–Colpack	+ 2' 23"

General classification after stage 6

Rank	Rider	Team	Time
1	Isidro Nozal (ESP)	ONCE–Eroski	15h 04' 37"
2	Igor González de Galdeano (ESP)	ONCE–Eroski	+ 2' 27"
3	Manuel Beltrán (ESP)	U.S. Postal Service	+ 2' 42"
4	Claus Michael Møller (DEN)	Milaneza–MSS	+ 4' 16"
5	Roberto Heras (ESP)	U.S. Postal Service	+ 4' 35"
6	Dario Frigo (ITA)	Fassa Bortolo	+ 4' 36"
7	Marcos Serrano (ESP)	ONCE–Eroski	+ 4' 49"
8	Francisco Mancebo (ESP)	iBanesto.com	+ 5' 02"
9	Aitor González (ESP)	Fassa Bortolo	+ 5' 15"
10	Alejandro Valverde (ESP)	Kelme–Costa Blanca	+ 5' 23"

== Stage 7 ==
12 September 2003 — Huesca to Cauterets, 190 km (120 mi)

Stage 7 result

Rank	Rider	Team	Time
1	Michael Rasmussen (DEN)	Rabobank	5h 01' 14"
2	Félix Cárdenas (COL)	Labarca–2–Café Baqué	+ 55"
3	Manuel Beltrán (ESP)	U.S. Postal Service	+ 59"
4	Luis Pérez (ESP)	Cofidis	+ 1' 08"
5	Aitor Osa (ESP)	iBanesto.com	+ 1' 10"
6	Dario Frigo (ITA)	Fassa Bortolo	+ 1' 17"
7	Francisco Mancebo (ESP)	iBanesto.com	+ 1' 24"
8	Alejandro Valverde (ESP)	Kelme–Costa Blanca	+ 1' 26"
9	Félix García Casas (ESP)	Team Bianchi	s.t.
10	Roberto Heras (ESP)	U.S. Postal Service	+ 1' 29"

General classification after stage 7

Rank	Rider	Team	Time
1	Isidro Nozal (ESP)	ONCE–Eroski	20h 08' 37"
2	Manuel Beltrán (ESP)	U.S. Postal Service	+ 55"
3	Igor González de Galdeano (ESP)	ONCE–Eroski	+ 1' 21"
4	Dario Frigo (ITA)	Fassa Bortolo	+ 3' 07"
5	Roberto Heras (ESP)	U.S. Postal Service	+ 3' 18"
6	Francisco Mancebo (ESP)	iBanesto.com	+ 3' 40"
7	Aitor González (ESP)	Fassa Bortolo	+ 4' 00"
8	Alejandro Valverde (ESP)	Kelme–Costa Blanca	+ 4' 03"
9	Michael Rasmussen (DEN)	Rabobank	+ 4' 24"
10	Unai Osa (ESP)	iBanesto.com	+ 4' 34"

== Stage 8 ==
13 September 2003 — Cauterets to Pla de Beret/Val d'Aran, 166 km (103 mi) (ITT)

Stage 8 result

Rank	Rider	Team	Time
1	Joaquim Rodríguez (ESP)	ONCE–Eroski	4h 45' 40"
2	Aitor Osa (ESP)	iBanesto.com	s.t.
3	Constantino Zaballa (ESP)	Kelme–Costa Blanca	+ 51"
4	Josep Jufré (ESP)	Colchon Relax–Fuenlabrada	s.t.
5	Joan Horrach (ESP)	Milaneza–MSS	+ 54"
6	Unai Etxebarria (VEN)	Euskaltel–Euskadi	+ 1' 13"
7	Denis Lunghi (ITA)	Alessio	+ 1' 32"
8	Eladio Jiménez (ESP)	iBanesto.com	+ 2' 15"
9	Michael Rasmussen (DEN)	Rabobank	+ 3' 31"
10	Luis Pérez (ESP)	Cofidis	s.t.

General classification after stage 8

Rank	Rider	Team	Time
1	Isidro Nozal (ESP)	ONCE–Eroski	24h 58' 08"
2	Igor González de Galdeano (ESP)	ONCE–Eroski	+ 1' 21"
3	Manuel Beltrán (ESP)	U.S. Postal Service	+ 1' 34"
4	Dario Frigo (ITA)	Fassa Bortolo	+ 3' 07"
5	Roberto Heras (ESP)	U.S. Postal Service	+ 3' 18"
6	Francisco Mancebo (ESP)	iBanesto.com	+ 3' 40"
7	Aitor González (ESP)	Fassa Bortolo	+ 4' 00"
8	Alejandro Valverde (ESP)	Kelme–Costa Blanca	+ 4' 03"
9	Michael Rasmussen (DEN)	Rabobank	+ 4' 04"
10	Unai Osa (ESP)	iBanesto.com	+ 4' 14"

== Stage 9 ==
14 September 2003 — Vielha to Envalira, 174.8 km (108.6 mi)

Stage 9 result

Rank	Rider	Team	Time
1	Alejandro Valverde (ESP)	Kelme–Costa Blanca	4h 48' 36"
2	Dario Frigo (ITA)	Fassa Bortolo	+ 1"
3	Unai Osa (ESP)	iBanesto.com	+ 3"
4	Leonardo Piepoli (ITA)	iBanesto.com	s.t.
5	Francisco Mancebo (ESP)	iBanesto.com	s.t.
6	Félix Cárdenas (COL)	Labarca-2-Café Baqué	s.t.
7	Isidro Nozal (ESP)	ONCE–Eroski	s.t.
8	Michele Scarponi (ITA)	De Nardi–Colpack	s.t.
9	Aitor González (ESP)	Fassa Bortolo	s.t.
10	Michael Rasmussen (DEN)	Rabobank	s.t.

General classification after stage 9

Rank	Rider	Team	Time
1	Isidro Nozal (ESP)	ONCE–Eroski	29h 46' 47"
2	Igor González de Galdeano (ESP)	ONCE–Eroski	+ 1' 48"
3	Manuel Beltrán (ESP)	U.S. Postal Service	+ 2' 01"
4	Dario Frigo (ITA)	Fassa Bortolo	+ 3' 05"
5	Roberto Heras (ESP)	U.S. Postal Service	+ 3' 28"
6	Francisco Mancebo (ESP)	iBanesto.com	+ 3' 40"
7	Aitor González (ESP)	Fassa Bortolo	+ 4' 00"
8	Alejandro Valverde (ESP)	Kelme–Costa Blanca	s.t.
9	Michael Rasmussen (DEN)	Rabobank	+ 4' 04"
10	Unai Osa (ESP)	iBanesto.com	+ 4' 14"

== Stage 10 ==
15 September 2003 — Andorra to Sabadell, 194 km (121 mi)

Stage 10 result

Rank	Rider	Team	Time
1	Erik Zabel (GER)	Team Telekom	4h 10' 51"
2	Alessandro Petacchi (ITA)	Fassa Bortolo	s.t.
3	Fabrizio Guidi (ITA)	Team Bianchi	s.t.
4	Fred Rodriguez (USA)	Vini Caldirola–So.di	s.t.
5	Tom Boonen (BEL)	Quick-Step–Davitamon	s.t.
6	Alejandro Valverde (ESP)	Kelme–Costa Blanca	s.t.
7	Ángel Edo (ESP)	Milaneza–MSS	s.t.
8	Carlos Torrent (ESP)	Paternina–Costa de Almería	s.t.
9	Alexandre Usov (BLR)	Phonak	s.t.
10	Óscar Pereiro (ESP)	Phonak	+ 3"

General classification after stage 10

Rank	Rider	Team	Time
1	Isidro Nozal (ESP)	ONCE–Eroski	33h 57' 41"
2	Igor González de Galdeano (ESP)	ONCE–Eroski	+ 1' 48"
3	Manuel Beltrán (ESP)	U.S. Postal Service	+ 2' 01"
4	Dario Frigo (ITA)	Fassa Bortolo	+ 3' 05"
5	Roberto Heras (ESP)	U.S. Postal Service	+ 3' 28"
6	Francisco Mancebo (ESP)	iBanesto.com	+ 3' 40"
7	Alejandro Valverde (ESP)	Kelme–Costa Blanca	+ 3' 57"
8	Aitor González (ESP)	Fassa Bortolo	+ 4' 00"
9	Michael Rasmussen (DEN)	Rabobank	+ 4' 04"
10	Unai Osa (ESP)	iBanesto.com	+ 4' 14"

== Stage 11 ==
17 September 2003 — Utiel to Cuenca, 162 km (101 mi)

Stage 11 result

Rank	Rider	Team	Time
1	Erik Zabel (GER)	Team Telekom	3h 14' 59"
2	Tom Boonen (BEL)	Quick-Step–Davitamon	s.t.
3	Ángel Edo (ESP)	Milaneza–MSS	s.t.
4	Alejandro Valverde (ESP)	Kelme–Costa Blanca	s.t.
5	Francisco Mancebo (ESP)	iBanesto.com	s.t.
6	Gorka González (ESP)	Euskaltel–Euskadi	s.t.
7	Stefano Casagranda (ITA)	Alessio	s.t.
8	George Hincapie (USA)	U.S. Postal Service	s.t.
9	Josep Jufré (ESP)	Colchon Relax–Fuenlabrada	s.t.
10	Michael Rasmussen (DEN)	Rabobank	s.t.

General classification after stage 11

Rank	Rider	Team	Time
1	Isidro Nozal (ESP)	ONCE–Eroski	37h 12' 40"
2	Igor González de Galdeano (ESP)	ONCE–Eroski	+ 1' 48"
3	Manuel Beltrán (ESP)	U.S. Postal Service	+ 3' 03"
4	Dario Frigo (ITA)	Fassa Bortolo	+ 3' 05"
5	Roberto Heras (ESP)	U.S. Postal Service	+ 3' 28"
6	Francisco Mancebo (ESP)	iBanesto.com	+ 3' 40"
7	Alejandro Valverde (ESP)	Kelme–Costa Blanca	+ 3' 57"
8	Aitor González (ESP)	Fassa Bortolo	+ 4' 00"
9	Michael Rasmussen (DEN)	Rabobank	+ 4' 04"
10	Unai Osa (ESP)	iBanesto.com	+ 4' 14"
