= 2003 Vuelta a España, Stage 12 to Stage 21 =

Cycling race stages

The 2003 Vuelta a España was the 58th edition of the Vuelta a España, one of cycling's Grand Tours. The Vuelta began in Gijón, with a team time trial on 6 September, and Stage 12 occurred on 18 September with a stage from Cuenca. The race finished in Madrid on 28 September.

== Stage 12 ==
18 September 2003 — Cuenca to Albacete, 168.8 km (104.9 mi)

Stage 12 result

Rank	Rider	Team	Time
1	Alessandro Petacchi (ITA)	Fassa Bortolo	3h 41' 49"
2	Erik Zabel (GER)	Team Telekom	s.t.
3	Fred Rodriguez (USA)	Vini Caldirola–So.di	s.t.
4	Alessandro Bertolini (ITA)	Alessio	s.t.
5	Raphael Schweda (GER)	Team Bianchi	s.t.
6	Ángel Vicioso (ESP)	ONCE–Eroski	s.t.
7	Francisco Mancebo (ESP)	iBanesto.com	s.t.
8	Michael Barry (CAN)	U.S. Postal Service	s.t.
9	Michael Rasmussen (DEN)	Rabobank	s.t.
10	Óscar Sevilla (ESP)	Kelme–Costa Blanca	s.t.

General classification after stage 12

Rank	Rider	Team	Time
1	Isidro Nozal (ESP)	ONCE–Eroski	40h 54' 29"
2	Igor González de Galdeano (ESP)	ONCE–Eroski	+ 1' 48"
3	Manuel Beltrán (ESP)	U.S. Postal Service	+ 3' 03"
4	Roberto Heras (ESP)	U.S. Postal Service	+ 3' 28"
5	Francisco Mancebo (ESP)	iBanesto.com	+ 3' 40"
6	Michael Rasmussen (DEN)	Rabobank	+ 4' 04"
7	Dario Frigo (ITA)	Fassa Bortolo	+ 4' 14"
8	Alejandro Valverde (ESP)	Kelme–Costa Blanca	+ 5' 06"
9	Aitor González (ESP)	Fassa Bortolo	+ 5' 09"
10	Unai Osa (ESP)	iBanesto.com	+ 5' 23"

== Stage 13 ==
19 September 2003 — Albacete – Albacete, 53.3 km (33.1 mi) (ITT)

Stage 13 result

Rank	Rider	Team	Time
1	Isidro Nozal (ESP)	ONCE–Eroski	1h 02' 03"
2	David Millar (GBR)	Cofidis	+ 13"
3	Sergei Ivanov (RUS)	Fassa Bortolo	+ 40"
4	Bert Grabsch (GER)	Phonak	+ 44"
5	Claus Michael Møller (DEN)	Milaneza–MSS	+ 45"
6	Igor González de Galdeano (ESP)	ONCE–Eroski	+ 1' 15"
7	Roberto Heras (ESP)	U.S. Postal Service	+ 1' 45"
8	Santos González (ESP)	De Nardi–Colpack	+ 2' 03"
9	Levi Leipheimer (USA)	Rabobank	+ 2' 14"
10	Antonio Tauler (ESP)	Kelme–Costa Blanca	+ 2' 23"

General classification after stage 13

Rank	Rider	Team	Time
1	Isidro Nozal (ESP)	ONCE–Eroski	41h 56' 32"
2	Igor González de Galdeano (ESP)	ONCE–Eroski	+ 3' 03"
3	Roberto Heras (ESP)	U.S. Postal Service	+ 5' 13"
4	Manuel Beltrán (ESP)	U.S. Postal Service	+ 5' 39"
5	Francisco Mancebo (ESP)	iBanesto.com	+ 7' 12"
6	Alejandro Valverde (ESP)	Kelme–Costa Blanca	+ 7' 50"
7	Michael Rasmussen (DEN)	Rabobank	+ 8' 44"
8	Luis Pérez (ESP)	Cofidis	+ 8' 49"
9	Dario Frigo (ITA)	Fassa Bortolo	+ 8' 50"
10	Unai Osa (ESP)	iBanesto.com	+ 10' 10"

== Stage 14 ==
20 September 2003 — Albacete to Valdepeñas, 167.4 km (104.0 mi)

Stage 14 result

Rank	Rider	Team	Time
1	Alessandro Petacchi (ITA)	Fassa Bortolo	3h 43' 16"
2	Fred Rodriguez (USA)	Vini Caldirola–So.di	s.t.
3	Erik Zabel (GER)	Team Telekom	s.t.
4	Thomas Bruun (DEN)	Team CSC	s.t.
5	Tom Boonen (BEL)	Quick-Step–Davitamon	s.t.
6	Angelo Furlan (ITA)	Alessio	s.t.
7	Steven de Jongh (NED)	Rabobank	s.t.
8	Gorka González (ESP)	Euskaltel–Euskadi	s.t.
9	Ángel Edo (ESP)	Milaneza–MSS	s.t.
10	Alberto Vinale (ITA)	Alessio	s.t.

General classification after stage 14

Rank	Rider	Team	Time
1	Isidro Nozal (ESP)	ONCE–Eroski	45h 39' 48"
2	Igor González de Galdeano (ESP)	ONCE–Eroski	+ 3' 03"
3	Roberto Heras (ESP)	U.S. Postal Service	+ 5' 13"
4	Manuel Beltrán (ESP)	U.S. Postal Service	+ 5' 39"
5	Francisco Mancebo (ESP)	iBanesto.com	+ 7' 12"
6	Alejandro Valverde (ESP)	Kelme–Costa Blanca	+ 7' 50"
7	Michael Rasmussen (DEN)	Rabobank	+ 8' 44"
8	Luis Pérez (ESP)	Cofidis	+ 8' 49"
9	Dario Frigo (ITA)	Fassa Bortolo	+ 8' 50"
10	Unai Osa (ESP)	iBanesto.com	+ 10' 10"

== Stage 15 ==
21 September 2003 — Valdepeñas to La Pandera, 172.1 km (106.9 mi)

Stage 15 result

Rank	Rider	Team	Time
1	Alejandro Valverde (ESP)	Kelme–Costa Blanca	4h 20' 39"
2	Félix Cárdenas (COL)	Labarca–2–Café Baqué	s.t.
3	Roberto Heras (ESP)	U.S. Postal Service	+ 2"
4	Óscar Sevilla (ESP)	Kelme–Costa Blanca	+ 10"
5	Miguel Martín Perdiguero (ESP)	De Nardi–Colpack	+ 56"
6	Luis Pérez Rodríguez (ESP)	Cofidis	+ 57"
7	Michael Rasmussen (DEN)	Rabobank	s.t.
8	Manuel Beltrán (ESP)	U.S. Postal Service	s.t.
9	Claus Michael Møller (DEN)	Milaneza–MSS	+ 58"
10	Unai Osa (ESP)	iBanesto.com	+ 1' 02"

General classification after stage 15

Rank	Rider	Team	Time
1	Isidro Nozal (ESP)	ONCE–Eroski	50h 01' 40"
2	Igor González de Galdeano (ESP)	ONCE–Eroski	+ 3' 03"
3	Roberto Heras (ESP)	U.S. Postal Service	+ 4' 02"
4	Manuel Beltrán (ESP)	U.S. Postal Service	+ 5' 23"
5	Alejandro Valverde (ESP)	Kelme–Costa Blanca	+ 6' 37"
6	Francisco Mancebo (ESP)	iBanesto.com	+ 7' 11"
7	Michael Rasmussen (DEN)	Rabobank	+ 8' 28"
8	Luis Pérez (ESP)	Cofidis	+ 8' 33"
9	Unai Osa (ESP)	iBanesto.com	+ 9' 59"
10	Santos González (ESP)	De Nardi–Colpack	+ 10' 59"

== Stage 16 ==
23 September 2003 — Jaén to Sierra Nevada, 162 km (101 mi)

Stage 16 result

Rank	Rider	Team	Time
1	Félix Cárdenas (COL)	Labarca–2–Café Baqué	4h 09' 35"
2	Juan Miguel Mercado (ESP)	iBanesto.com	+ 5"
3	Óscar Sevilla (ESP)	Kelme–Costa Blanca	+ 18"
4	Alejandro Valverde (ESP)	Kelme–Costa Blanca	s.t.
5	Leonardo Piepoli (ITA)	iBanesto.com	+ 21"
6	Txema del Olmo (ESP)	Milaneza–MSS	+ 31"
7	Unai Osa (ESP)	iBanesto.com	+ 58"
8	Roberto Heras (ESP)	U.S. Postal Service	+ 1' 02"
9	Michael Rasmussen (DEN)	Rabobank	s.t.
10	Francisco Mancebo (ESP)	iBanesto.com	+ 1' 11"

General classification after stage 16

Rank	Rider	Team	Time
1	Isidro Nozal (ESP)	ONCE–Eroski	54h 13' 10"
2	Igor González de Galdeano (ESP)	ONCE–Eroski	+ 3' 03"
3	Roberto Heras (ESP)	U.S. Postal Service	+ 3' 09"
4	Manuel Beltrán (ESP)	U.S. Postal Service	+ 5' 16"
5	Alejandro Valverde (ESP)	Kelme–Costa Blanca	+ 5' 20"
6	Francisco Mancebo (ESP)	iBanesto.com	+ 6' 27"
7	Michael Rasmussen (DEN)	Rabobank	+ 7' 34"
8	Luis Pérez (ESP)	Cofidis	+ 8' 51"
9	Unai Osa (ESP)	iBanesto.com	+ 9' 02"
10	Félix Cárdenas (COL)	Labarca–2–Café Baqué	+ 9' 28"

== Stage 17 ==
24 September 2003 — Granada to Córdoba, 188.4 km (117.1 mi)

Stage 17 result

Rank	Rider	Team	Time
1	David Millar (GBR)	Cofidis	3h 58' 02"
2	Alberto Martínez (ESP)	Euskaltel–Euskadi	+ 36"
3	Óscar Sevilla (ESP)	Kelme–Costa Blanca	s.t.
4	Unai Osa (ESP)	iBanesto.com	s.t.
5	Michael Rasmussen (DEN)	Rabobank	s.t.
6	Erik Zabel (GER)	Team Telekom	+ 41"
7	Fred Rodriguez (USA)	Vini Caldirola–So.di	s.t.
8	Ángel Edo (ESP)	Milaneza–MSS	s.t.
9	Tom Boonen (BEL)	Quick-Step–Davitamon	s.t.
10	Giovanni Lombardi (ITA)	De Nardi–Colpack	s.t.

General classification after stage 17

Rank	Rider	Team	Time
1	Isidro Nozal (ESP)	ONCE–Eroski	58h 11' 53"
2	Igor González de Galdeano (ESP)	ONCE–Eroski	+ 3' 03"
3	Roberto Heras (ESP)	U.S. Postal Service	+ 3' 09"
4	Manuel Beltrán (ESP)	U.S. Postal Service	+ 5' 16"
5	Alejandro Valverde (ESP)	Kelme–Costa Blanca	+ 5' 20"
6	Francisco Mancebo (ESP)	iBanesto.com	+ 6' 27"
7	Michael Rasmussen (DEN)	Rabobank	+ 7' 29"
8	Luis Pérez (ESP)	Cofidis	+ 8' 51"
9	Unai Osa (ESP)	iBanesto.com	+ 8' 57"
10	Félix Cárdenas (COL)	Labarca–2–Café Baqué	+ 9' 28"

== Stage 18 ==
25 September 2003 — Las Rozas to Las Rozas, 143.8 km (89.4 mi)

Stage 18 result

Rank	Rider	Team	Time
1	Pedro Díaz Lobato (ESP)	Paternina–Costa de Almería	3h 07' 47"
2	Constantino Zaballa (ESP)	Kelme–Costa Blanca	+ 44"
3	José Luis Arrieta (ESP)	iBanesto.com	s.t.
4	Raphael Schweda (GER)	Team Bianchi	s.t.
5	José Vicente García (ESP)	iBanesto.com	s.t.
6	Iñaki Isasi (ESP)	Euskaltel–Euskadi	s.t.
7	Joan Horrach (ESP)	Milaneza–MSS	+ 47"
8	Óscar Laguna (ESP)	Colchon Relax–Fuenlabrada	+ 52"
9	Carlos García (ESP)	Kelme–Costa Blanca	+ 56"
10	Erik Zabel (GER)	Team Telekom	+ 58"

General classification after stage 18

Rank	Rider	Team	Time
1	Isidro Nozal (ESP)	ONCE–Eroski	61h 20' 42"
2	Igor González de Galdeano (ESP)	ONCE–Eroski	+ 3' 03"
3	Roberto Heras (ESP)	U.S. Postal Service	+ 3' 09"
4	Manuel Beltrán (ESP)	U.S. Postal Service	+ 5' 16"
5	Alejandro Valverde (ESP)	Kelme–Costa Blanca	+ 5' 20"
6	Francisco Mancebo (ESP)	iBanesto.com	+ 6' 27"
7	Michael Rasmussen (DEN)	Rabobank	+ 7' 25"
8	Luis Pérez (ESP)	Cofidis	+ 8' 51"
9	Unai Osa (ESP)	iBanesto.com	+ 8' 57"
10	Félix Cárdenas (COL)	Labarca–2–Café Baqué	+ 9' 28"

== Stage 19 ==
26 September 2003 — Alcobendas to Collado Villalba, 164 km (102 mi)

Stage 19 result

Rank	Rider	Team	Time
1	Filippo Simeoni (ITA)	De Nardi–Colpack	3h 51' 18"
2	Claus Michael Møller (DEN)	Milaneza–MSS	s.t
3	Miguel Martín Perdiguero (ESP)	De Nardi–Colpack	+ 16"
4	Cristian Moreni (ITA)	Alessio	s.t.
5	Beat Zberg (SUI)	Rabobank	s.t.
6	Félix Cárdenas (COL)	Labarca-2-Café Baqué	s.t.
7	Unai Osa (ESP)	iBanesto.com	s.t.
8	Michael Rasmussen (DEN)	Rabobank	s.t.
9	Alejandro Valverde (ESP)	Kelme–Costa Blanca	s.t.
10	Óscar Sevilla (ESP)	Kelme–Costa Blanca	s.t.

General classification after stage 19

Rank	Rider	Team	Time
1	Isidro Nozal (ESP)	ONCE–Eroski	65h 13' 30"
2	Roberto Heras (ESP)	U.S. Postal Service	+ 1' 55"
3	Igor González de Galdeano (ESP)	ONCE–Eroski	+ 3' 03"
4	Alejandro Valverde (ESP)	Kelme–Costa Blanca	+ 4' 06"
5	Francisco Mancebo (ESP)	iBanesto.com	+ 5' 13"
6	Manuel Beltrán (ESP)	U.S. Postal Service	+ 5' 16"
7	Michael Rasmussen (DEN)	Rabobank	+ 6' 11"
8	Luis Pérez (ESP)	Cofidis	+ 7' 37"
9	Unai Osa (ESP)	iBanesto.com	+ 7' 43"
10	Félix Cárdenas (COL)	Labarca–2–Café Baqué	+ 8' 14"

== Stage 20 ==
27 September 2003 — San Lorenzo de El Escorial to Alto de Abantos, 11.2 km (7.0 mi) (ITT)

Stage 20 result

Rank	Rider	Team	Time
1	Roberto Heras (ESP)	U.S. Postal Service	25' 08"
2	Alejandro Valverde (ESP)	Kelme–Costa Blanca	+ 14"
3	Félix Cárdenas (COL)	Labarca–2–Café Baqué	s.t.
4	Fabian Jeker (SUI)	Milaneza–MSS	+ 15"
5	Santos González (ESP)	De Nardi–Colpack	+ 22"
6	Roberto Laiseka (ESP)	Euskaltel–Euskadi	+ 32"
7	Dario Frigo (ITA)	Fassa Bortolo	+ 34"
8	Levi Leipheimer (USA)	Rabobank	+ 48"
9	Óscar Sevilla (ESP)	Kelme–Costa Blanca	+ 58"
10	Unai Osa (ESP)	iBanesto.com	+ 1' 03"

General classification after stage 20

Rank	Rider	Team	Time
1	Roberto Heras (ESP)	U.S. Postal Service	65h 40' 33"
2	Isidro Nozal (ESP)	ONCE–Eroski	+ 28"
3	Alejandro Valverde (ESP)	Kelme–Costa Blanca	+ 2' 25"
4	Igor González de Galdeano (ESP)	ONCE–Eroski	+ 3' 27"
5	Francisco Mancebo (ESP)	iBanesto.com	+ 4' 47"
6	Manuel Beltrán (ESP)	U.S. Postal Service	+ 5' 51"
7	Michael Rasmussen (DEN)	Rabobank	+ 5' 56"
8	Félix Cárdenas (COL)	Labarca–2–Café Baqué	+ 6' 33"
9	Unai Osa (ESP)	iBanesto.com	+ 6' 51"
10	Luis Pérez (ESP)	Cofidis	+ 7' 56"

== Stage 21 ==
28 September 2003 — Madrid to Madrid, 148.5 km (92.3 mi)

Stage 21 result

Rank	Rider	Team	Time
1	Alessandro Petacchi (ITA)	Fassa Bortolo	3h 51' 19"
2	Erik Zabel (GER)	Team Telekom	s.t.
3	Fred Rodriguez (USA)	Vini Caldirola–So.di	s.t.
4	Alexandre Usov (BLR)	Phonak	s.t.
5	Ángel Edo (ESP)	Milaneza–MSS	s.t.
6	Miguel Martín Perdiguero (ESP)	De Nardi–Colpack	s.t.
7	Patrick Calcagni (SUI)	Vini Caldirola–So.di	s.t.
8	Alejandro Valverde (ESP)	Kelme–Costa Blanca	s.t.
9	Carlos Torrent (ESP)	Paternina–Costa de Almería	s.t.
10	Angelo Furlan (ITA)	Alessio	s.t.

General classification after stage 21

Rank	Rider	Team	Time
1	Roberto Heras (ESP)	U.S. Postal Service	69h 31' 52"
2	Isidro Nozal (ESP)	ONCE–Eroski	+ 28"
3	Alejandro Valverde (ESP)	Kelme–Costa Blanca	+ 2' 25"
4	Igor González de Galdeano (ESP)	ONCE–Eroski	+ 3' 27"
5	Francisco Mancebo (ESP)	iBanesto.com	+ 4' 47"
6	Manuel Beltrán (ESP)	U.S. Postal Service	+ 5' 51"
7	Michael Rasmussen (DEN)	Rabobank	+ 5' 56"
8	Félix Cárdenas (COL)	Labarca–2–Café Baqué	+ 6' 33"
9	Unai Osa (ESP)	iBanesto.com	+ 6' 51"
10	Luis Pérez (ESP)	Cofidis	+ 7' 56"
