= 2002 Züri-Metzgete =

2002 UCI Road World Cup

Race details
- Dates: 18 August 2002
- Stages: 1
- Distance: 236.6 km (147.0 mi)
- Winning time: 5h 56' 54"

Results
	Winner	Dario Frigo (ITA)	(Tacconi Sport)
	Second	Paolo Bettini (ITA)	(Mapei–Quick-Step)
	Third	~~Lance Armstrong~~ (USA)	(U.S. Postal Service)

The 2002 Züri-Metzgete was the 87th edition of the Züri-Metzgete road cycling one day race. It was held on 18 August 2002 as part of the 2002 UCI Road World Cup. The race was won by Dario Frigo of Italy.

== Result ==
	Cyclist	Team	Time
1	Dario Frigo (ITA)	Tacconi Sport	5h 56' 54"
2	Paolo Bettini (ITA)	Mapei–Quick-Step	+ 1' 06"
~~3~~	~~Lance Armstrong (USA)~~	U.S. Postal Service	s.t.
4	Massimiliano Gentili (ITA)	Acqua & Sapone–Cantina Tollo	s.t.
5	Carlos Sastre (ESP)	CSC–Tiscali	s.t.
6	Michele Bartoli (ITA)	Fassa Bortolo	s.t.
7	Davide Rebellin (ITA)	Gerolsteiner	s.t.
8	Oscar Camenzind (SUI)	Phonak	+ 0"
9	Ivan Basso (ITA)	Fassa Bortolo	s.t.
10	Laurent Dufaux (SUI)	Alessio	s.t.
