= 2002 UCI Road World Cup =

- Fourteenth edition of the UCI Road World Cup

Details
- Dates: 23 March – 19 October
- Location: Europe
- Races: 10

Champions
- Individual champion: Paolo Bettini (ITA) (Mapei–Quick-Step)
- Teams' champion: Mapei–Quick-Step

The 2002 UCI Road World Cup was the fourteenth edition of the UCI Road World Cup. It had the same calendar of the 2001 edition.

After the Milan-Sanremo win by Mario Cipollini, who keep the lead after the Tour of Flanders, Johan Museeuw take the lead with Tour of Flanders second place and Paris-Roubaix win. Paolo Bettini with the Liège–Bastogne–Liège win and with a top ten in the Amstel Gold Race keep his position not far from Museeuw after the first five spring races.

With the win in Hamburg at HEW Cyclassics, with a very long sprint, Museeuw take a good margin on Bettini but the italian was very regular and with three top-ten finishes in the summer races (second in Zurich) took the lead by only two points.

Paris-Tours seems more favourable for the fast Museeuw but he took no points, while Bettini finished 19th taking other 7 points.

The Giro di Lombardia was too hard for Museeuw who didn't start the race giving the World Cup win to Bettini who finish low in the race. Michele Bartoli won the race and clinched the final spot in the World Cup podium along the winner Bettini and Museeuw, who take the fifth and final World Cup podium, a record for the competition.

== Races ==
Date	Race	Country	Winner	Team	World Cup Leader	Leader's Team	Report
23 March	Milan–San Remo	Italy	Mario Cipollini (ITA)	Acqua & Sapone–Cantina Tollo	Mario Cipollini (ITA)	Acqua & Sapone–Cantina Tollo	Report
7 April	Tour of Flanders	Belgium	Andrea Tafi (ITA)	Mapei–Quick-Step	Mario Cipollini (ITA)	Acqua & Sapone–Cantina Tollo	Report
14 April	Paris–Roubaix	France	Johan Museeuw (BEL)	Domo–Farm Frites	Johan Museeuw (BEL)	Domo–Farm Frites	Report
21 April	Liège–Bastogne–Liège	Belgium	Paolo Bettini (ITA)	Mapei–Quick-Step	Johan Museeuw (BEL)	Domo–Farm Frites	Report
28 April	Amstel Gold Race	Netherlands	Michele Bartoli (ITA)	Fassa Bortolo	Johan Museeuw (BEL)	Domo–Farm Frites	Report
4 August	HEW Cyclassics	Germany	Johan Museeuw (BEL)	Domo–Farm Frites	Johan Museeuw (BEL)	Domo–Farm Frites	Report
10 August	Clásica de San Sebastián	Spain	Laurent Jalabert (FRA)	CSC–Tiscali	Johan Museeuw (BEL)	Domo–Farm Frites	Report
18 August	Züri-Metzgete	Switzerland	Dario Frigo (ITA)	Tacconi Sport	Paolo Bettini (ITA)	Mapei–Quick-Step	Report
6 October	Paris–Tours	France	Jakob Piil (DEN)	CSC–Tiscali	Paolo Bettini (ITA)	Mapei–Quick-Step	Report
19 October	Giro di Lombardia	Italy	Michele Bartoli (ITA)	Fassa Bortolo	Paolo Bettini (ITA)	Mapei–Quick-Step	Report

== Single races details ==
worldcupjersey	Denotes the Classification Leader

In the race results the leader jersey identify the rider who wore the jersey in the race (the leader at the start of the race).

In the general classification table the jersey identify the leader after the race.

23 March 2002 — Milan–San Remo 287 km (178.3 mi)

	Rider	Team	Time
1	Mario Cipollini (ITA)	Acqua & Sapone–Cantina Tollo	6h 39' 29"
2	Fred Rodriguez (USA)	Domo–Farm Frites	s.t.
3	Markus Zberg (SUI)	Rabobank	s.t.
4	Jo Planckaert (BEL)	Cofidis	s.t.
5	Óscar Freire (ESP)	Mapei–Quick-Step	s.t.
6	Tomáš Konečný (CZE)	Domo–Farm Frites	s.t.
7	Andrei Tchmil (BEL)	Lotto–Adecco	s.t.
8	Ján Svorada (CZE)	Lampre–Daikin	s.t.
9	Paolo Bossoni (ITA)	Tacconi Sport	s.t.
10	Mario Manzoni (ITA)	Index–Alexia Alluminio	s.t.

General classification after Milan–San Remo

	Rider	Team	Points
1	Mario Cipollini (ITA)	Acqua & Sapone–Cantina Tollo	100
2	Fred Rodriguez (USA)	Domo–Farm Frites	70
3	Markus Zberg (SUI)	Rabobank	50
4	Jo Planckaert (BEL)	Cofidis	40
5	Óscar Freire (ESP)	Mapei–Quick-Step	36
6	Tomáš Konečný (CZE)	Domo–Farm Frites	32
7	Andrei Tchmil (BEL)	Lotto–Adecco	28
8	Ján Svorada (CZE)	Lampre–Daikin	24
9	Paolo Bossoni (ITA)	Tacconi Sport	20
10	Mario Manzoni (ITA)	Index–Alexia Alluminio	16

7 April 2002 — Tour of Flanders 264 km (164.0 mi)

	Rider	Team	Time
1	Andrea Tafi (ITA)	Mapei–Quick-Step	6h 53' 00"
2	Johan Museeuw (BEL)	Domo–Farm Frites	+ 21"
3	Peter Van Petegem (BEL)	Lotto–Adecco	s.t.
4	George Hincapie (USA)	U.S. Postal Service	s.t.
5	Daniele Nardello (ITA)	Mapei–Quick-Step	s.t.
6	Rolf Sörensen (DEN)	Landbouwkrediet–Colnago	+ 1' 12"
7	Enrico Cassani (ITA)	Domo–Farm Frites	s.t.
8	Gabriele Missaglia (ITA)	Lampre–Daikin	s.t.
9	Mario Cipollini (ITA)	Acqua & Sapone–Cantina Tollo	+ 2' 27"
10	Erik Zabel (GER)	Team Telekom	s.t.

General classification after Tour of Flanders

	Rider	Team	Points
1	Mario Cipollini (ITA)	Acqua & Sapone–Cantina Tollo	120
2	Andrea Tafi (ITA)	Mapei–Quick-Step	100
3	Fred Rodriguez (USA)	Domo–Farm Frites	79
4	Johan Museeuw (BEL)	Domo–Farm Frites	70
5	Peter Van Petegem (BEL)	Lotto–Adecco	61
6	Jo Planckaert (BEL)	Cofidis	55
7	Markus Zberg (SUI)	Rabobank	51
8	George Hincapie (USA)	U.S. Postal Service	50
9	Daniele Nardello (ITA)	Mapei–Quick-Step	36
10	Óscar Freire (ESP)	Mapei–Quick-Step	36

14 April 2002 — Paris–Roubaix 261 km (162.2 mi)

	Rider	Team	Time
1	Johan Museeuw (BEL)	Domo–Farm Frites	6h 39' 08"
2	Steffen Wesemann (GER)	Team Telekom	+ 3' 04"
3	Tom Boonen (BEL)	U.S. Postal Service	+ 3' 08"
4	Tristan Hoffman (NED)	CSC–Tiscali	+ 4' 02"
5	Lars Michaelsen (DEN)	Team Coast	s.t.
6	George Hincapie (USA)	U.S. Postal Service	s.t.
7	Thierry Gouvenou (FRA)	BigMat–Auber 93	s.t.
8	Max van Heeswijk (NED)	Domo–Farm Frites	s.t.
9	Nico Mattan (BEL)	Cofidis	s.t.
10	Enrico Cassani (ITA)	Domo–Farm Frites	s.t.

General classification after Paris–Roubaix

	Rider	Team	Points
1	Johan Museeuw (BEL)	Domo–Farm Frites	170
2	Mario Cipollini (ITA)	Acqua & Sapone–Cantina Tollo	120
3	Andrea Tafi (ITA)	Mapei–Quick-Step	109
4	George Hincapie (USA)	U.S. Postal Service	82
5	Fred Rodriguez (USA)	Domo–Farm Frites	79
6	Steffen Wesemann (GER)	Team Telekom	70
7	Peter Van Petegem (BEL)	Lotto–Adecco	61
8	Jo Planckaert (BEL)	Cofidis	55
9	Tom Boonen (BEL)	U.S. Postal Service	52
10	Markus Zberg (SUI)	Rabobank	51

21 April 2002 — Liège–Bastogne–Liège 258 km (160.3 mi)

	Rider	Team	Time
1	Paolo Bettini (ITA)	Mapei–Quick-Step	6h 39' 44"
2	Stefano Garzelli (ITA)	Mapei–Quick-Step	s.t.
3	Ivan Basso (ITA)	Fassa Bortolo	+ 15"
4	Mirko Celestino (ITA)	Saeco–Longoni Sport	+ 23"
5	Massimo Codol (ITA)	Lampre–Daikin	+ 28"
6	Matthias Kessler (GER)	Team Telekom	+ 35"
7	Peter Van Petegem (BEL)	Lotto–Adecco	+ 1' 03"
8	Francesco Casagrande (ITA)	Fassa Bortolo	s.t.
9	Davide Rebellin (ITA)	Gerolsteiner	s.t.
10	Alexander Vinokourov (KAZ)	Team Telekom	s.t.

General classification after Liège–Bastogne–Liège

	Rider	Team	Points
1	Johan Museeuw (BEL)	Domo–Farm Frites	170
2	Mario Cipollini (ITA)	Acqua & Sapone–Cantina Tollo	120
3	Paolo Bettini (ITA)	Mapei–Quick-Step	110
4	Andrea Tafi (ITA)	Mapei–Quick-Step	109
5	Peter Van Petegem (BEL)	Lotto–Adecco	89
6	George Hincapie (USA)	U.S. Postal Service	88
7	Fred Rodriguez (USA)	Domo–Farm Frites	79
8	Stefano Garzelli (ITA)	Mapei–Quick-Step	70
9	Steffen Wesemann (GER)	Team Telekom	70
10	Jo Planckaert (BEL)	Cofidis	55

28 April 2002 — Amstel Gold Race 254.4 km (158.1 mi)

	Rider	Team	Time
1	Michele Bartoli (ITA)	Fassa Bortolo	6h 49' 17"
2	Sergei Ivanov (RUS)	Fassa Bortolo	s.t.
3	Michael Boogerd (NED)	Rabobank	s.t.
~~4~~	~~Lance Armstrong (USA)~~	U.S. Postal Service	s.t.
5	Óscar Freire (ESP)	Mapei–Quick-Step	+ 52"
6	Peter Van Petegem (BEL)	Lotto–Adecco	s.t.
7	Jo Planckaert (BEL)	Cofidis	s.t.
8	Paolo Bettini (ITA)	Mapei–Quick-Step	s.t.
9	Erik Zabel (GER)	Team Telekom	s.t.
10	Nico Mattan (BEL)	Cofidis	s.t.

General classification after Amstel Gold Race

	Rider	Team	Points
1	Johan Museeuw (BEL)	Domo–Farm Frites	170
2	Paolo Bettini (ITA)	Mapei–Quick-Step	134
3	Peter Van Petegem (BEL)	Lotto–Adecco	121
4	Mario Cipollini (ITA)	Acqua & Sapone–Cantina Tollo	120
5	Andrea Tafi (ITA)	Mapei–Quick-Step	109
6	Michele Bartoli (ITA)	Fassa Bortolo	100
7	George Hincapie (USA)	U.S. Postal Service	88
8	Jo Planckaert (BEL)	Cofidis	83
9	Fred Rodriguez (USA)	Domo–Farm Frites	79
10	Óscar Freire (ESP)	Mapei–Quick-Step	76

4 August 2002 — HEW Cyclassics 253.2 km (157.3 mi)

	Rider	Team	Time
1	Johan Museeuw (BEL)	Domo–Farm Frites	5h 43' 35"
2	Igor Astarloa (ESP)	Saeco–Longoni Sport	s.t.
3	Davide Rebellin (ITA)	Gerolsteiner	s.t.
4	Paolo Bettini (ITA)	Mapei–Quick-Step	s.t.
5	George Hincapie (USA)	U.S. Postal Service	s.t.
6	Fabio Baldato (ITA)	Fassa Bortolo	s.t.
7	Cristian Moreni (ITA)	Alessio	s.t.
8	Andrea Ferrigato (ITA)	Alessio	+ 2"
9	Danilo Di Luca (ITA)	Saeco–Longoni Sport	+ 3"
10	Romāns Vainšteins (LAT)	Domo–Farm Frites	+ 12"

General classification after HEW Cyclassics

	Rider	Team	Points
1	Johan Museeuw (BEL)	Domo–Farm Frites	270
2	Paolo Bettini (ITA)	Mapei–Quick-Step	174
3	George Hincapie (USA)	U.S. Postal Service	124
4	Peter Van Petegem (BEL)	Lotto–Adecco	121
5	Mario Cipollini (ITA)	Acqua & Sapone–Cantina Tollo	120
6	Andrea Tafi (ITA)	Mapei–Quick-Step	109
7	Michele Bartoli (ITA)	Fassa Bortolo	100
8	Jo Planckaert (BEL)	Cofidis	83
9	Igor Astarloa (ESP)	Saeco–Longoni Sport	82
10	Fred Rodriguez (USA)	Domo–Farm Frites	79

10 August 2002 — Clásica de San Sebastián 227 km (141.1 mi)

	Rider	Team	Time
1	Laurent Jalabert (FRA)	CSC–Tiscali	5h 47' 29"
2	Igor Astarloa (ESP)	Saeco–Longoni Sport	s.t.
3	Gabriele Missaglia (ITA)	Lampre–Daikin	s.t.
4	Andrey Kivilev (KAZ)	Cofidis	s.t.
5	Dario Frigo (ITA)	Tacconi Sport	s.t.
6	Danilo Di Luca (ITA)	Saeco–Longoni Sport	+ 35"
7	Paolo Bettini (ITA)	Mapei–Quick-Step	s.t.
8	Nico Mattan (BEL)	Cofidis	s.t.
9	Laurent Dufaux (SUI)	Alessio	s.t.
10	Gennady Mikhaylov (RUS)	Lotto–Adecco	+ 41"

General classification after Clásica de San Sebastián

	Rider	Team	Points
1	Johan Museeuw (BEL)	Domo–Farm Frites	270
2	Paolo Bettini (ITA)	Mapei–Quick-Step	202
3	Igor Astarloa (ESP)	Saeco–Longoni Sport	152
4	George Hincapie (USA)	U.S. Postal Service	124
5	Peter Van Petegem (BEL)	Lotto–Adecco	121
6	Michele Bartoli (ITA)	Fassa Bortolo	110
7	Andrea Tafi (ITA)	Mapei–Quick-Step	109
8	Laurent Jalabert (FRA)	CSC–Tiscali	100
9	Óscar Freire (ESP)	Mapei–Quick-Step	92
10	Jo Planckaert (BEL)	Cofidis	83

18 August 2002 — Züri-Metzgete 236.6 km (147.0 mi)

	Rider	Team	Time
1	Dario Frigo (ITA)	Tacconi Sport	5h 56' 54"
2	Paolo Bettini (ITA)	Mapei–Quick-Step	+ 1' 06"
~~3~~	~~Lance Armstrong (USA)~~	U.S. Postal Service	s.t.
4	Massimiliano Gentili (ITA)	Acqua & Sapone–Cantina Tollo	s.t.
5	Carlos Sastre (ESP)	CSC–Tiscali	s.t.
6	Michele Bartoli (ITA)	Fassa Bortolo	s.t.
7	Davide Rebellin (ITA)	Gerolsteiner	s.t.
8	Oscar Camenzind (SUI)	Phonak	s.t.
9	Ivan Basso (ITA)	Fassa Bortolo	s.t.
10	Laurent Dufaux (SUI)	Alessio	s.t.

General classification after Züri-Metzgete

	Rider	Team	Points
1	Paolo Bettini (ITA)	Mapei–Quick-Step	272
2	Johan Museeuw (BEL)	Domo–Farm Frites	270
3	Igor Astarloa (ESP)	Saeco–Longoni Sport	152
4	Michele Bartoli (ITA)	Fassa Bortolo	142
5	Dario Frigo (ITA)	Tacconi Sport	136
6	George Hincapie (USA)	U.S. Postal Service	124
7	Peter Van Petegem (BEL)	Lotto–Adecco	121
8	Andrea Tafi (ITA)	Mapei–Quick-Step	109
9	Davide Rebellin (ITA)	Gerolsteiner	109
10	Laurent Jalabert (FRA)	CSC–Tiscali	100

2 October 2002 — Paris–Tours 257 km (159.7 mi)

	Rider	Team	Time
1	Jakob Piil (DEN)	CSC–Tiscali	5h 39' 11"
2	Jacky Durand (FRA)	Française des Jeux	s.t.
3	Erik Zabel (GER)	Team Telekom	+ 20"
4	René Haselbacher (AUT)	Gerolsteiner	s.t.
5	Romāns Vainšteins (LAT)	Domo–Farm Frites	s.t.
6	José Enrique Gutiérrez (ESP)	Kelme–Costa Blanca	s.t.
7	Igor Astarloa (ESP)	Saeco–Longoni Sport	s.t.
8	Jo Planckaert (BEL)	Cofidis	s.t.
9	Fabio Sacchi (ITA)	Saeco–Longoni Sport	s.t.
10	Julian Dean (AUS)	U.S. Postal Service	s.t.

General classification after Paris–Tours

	Rider	Team	Points
1	Paolo Bettini (ITA)	Mapei–Quick-Step	279
2	Johan Museeuw (BEL)	Domo–Farm Frites	270
3	Igor Astarloa (ESP)	Saeco–Longoni Sport	180
4	Michele Bartoli (ITA)	Fassa Bortolo	142
5	Dario Frigo (ITA)	Tacconi Sport	136
6	George Hincapie (USA)	U.S. Postal Service	124
7	Peter Van Petegem (BEL)	Lotto–Adecco	121
8	Óscar Freire (ESP)	Mapei–Quick-Step	111
9	Davide Rebellin (ITA)	Gerolsteiner	109
10	Jo Planckaert (BEL)	Cofidis	107

19 October 2002 — Giro di Lombardia 251 km (156.0 mi)

	Rider	Team	Time
1	Michele Bartoli (ITA)	Fassa Bortolo	6h 14' 49"
2	Davide Rebellin (ITA)	Gerolsteiner	s.t.
3	Oscar Camenzind (SUI)	Phonak	s.t.
4	Marco Serpellini (ITA)	Lampre–Daikin	s.t.
5	Francesco Casagrande (ITA)	Fassa Bortolo	s.t.
6	Michael Boogerd (NED)	Rabobank	s.t.
7	Pablo Lastras (ESP)	iBanesto.com	s.t.
8	Joseba Beloki (ESP)	ONCE–Eroski	s.t.
9	Dario Frigo (ITA)	Tacconi Sport	s.t.
10	Francisco Mancebo (ESP)	iBanesto.com	s.t.

General classification after Giro di Lombardia

	Rider	Team	Points
1	Paolo Bettini (ITA)	Mapei–Quick-Step	279
2	Johan Museeuw (BEL)	Domo–Farm Frites	270
3	Michele Bartoli (ITA)	Fassa Bortolo	242
4	Igor Astarloa (ESP)	Saeco–Longoni Sport	183
5	Davide Rebellin (ITA)	Gerolsteiner	179
6	Dario Frigo (ITA)	Tacconi Sport	156
7	George Hincapie (USA)	U.S. Postal Service	124
8	Peter Van Petegem (BEL)	Lotto–Adecco	121
9	Óscar Freire (ESP)	Mapei–Quick-Step	111
10	Jo Planckaert (BEL)	Cofidis	107

== Final standings ==
=== Individual ===
Points are awarded to the top 25 classified riders. Riders must start at least 6 races to be classified.

The points are awarded for every race using the following system:

Position	1st	2nd	3rd	4th	5th	6th	7th	8th	9th	10th	11th	12th	13th	14th	15th	16th	17th	18th	19th	20th	21st	22nd	23rd	24th	25th
Points	100	70	50	40	36	32	28	24	20	16	15	14	13	12	11	10	9	8	7	6	5	4	3	2	1

Pos.	Rider	Team	MSR	ToF	ROU	LBL	AGR	HEW	CSS	ZUR	TOU	LOM	Pts.
1	Paolo Bettini (ITA)	Mapei–Quick-Step	0	10	DNS	100	24	40	28	70	7	0	279
2	Johan Museeuw (BEL)	Domo–Farm Frites	DNS	70	100	DNS	0	100	0	0	0	DNS	270
3	Michele Bartoli (ITA)	Fassa Bortolo	0	0	DNS	0	100	DNS	10	32	0	100	242
4	Igor Astarloa (ESP)	Saeco–Longoni Sport	0	DNS	DNS	0	12	70	70	0	28	3	183
5	Davide Rebellin (ITA)	Gerolsteiner	0	DNS	DNS	20	0	50	11	28	0	70	179
6	Dario Frigo (ITA)	Tacconi Sport	0	DNS	DNS	0	DNS	DNS	36	100	0	20	156
7	George Hincapie (USA)	U.S. Postal Service	10	40	32	6	0	36	0	DNS	DNS	DNS	124
8	Peter Van Petegem (BEL)	Lotto–Adecco	11	50	0	28	32	0	DNS	0	0	DNS	121
9	Óscar Freire (ESP)	Mapei–Quick-Step	36	DNS	DNS	4	36	1	15	4	15	0	111
10	Jo Planckaert (BEL)	Cofidis	40	15	0	DNS	28	0	DNS	DNS	24	DNS	107
11	Jacob Piil (DEN)	CSC–Tiscali	0	DNS	DNS	0	0	0	DNS	DNS	100	0	100
12	Michael Boogerd (NED)	Rabobank	DNS	DNS	DNS	13	50	DNS	0	0	0	32	95
13	Lance Armstrong (USA)	U.S. Postal Service	0	0	DNS	0	40	DNS	0	50	DNS	DNS	90
14	Erik Zabel (GER)	Team Telekom	0	16	0	DNS	20	0	DNS	DNS	50	DNS	86
15	Sergei Ivanov (RUS)	Fassa Bortolo	0	0	0	0	70	0	DNS	15	0	DNS	85
16	Ivan Basso (ITA)	Fassa Bortolo	0	DNS	DNS	50	0	DNS	0	20	0	11	81
17	Fred Rodriguez (USA)	Domo–Farm Frites	70	9	0	0	0	DNS	0	DNS	DNS	DNS	79
18	Gabriele Missaglia (ITA)	Lampre–Daikin	0	24	DNS	0	0	DNS	50	0	0	0	74
19	Marcus Zberg (SUI)	Rabobank	50	1	DNS	0	0	9	DNS	7	DNS	DNS	67
20	Mirko Celestino (ITA)	Saeco–Longoni Sport	0	0	DNS	40	0	13	14	0	DNS	0	67
Race winners not eligible for general classification
Pos.	Rider	Team	MSR	ToF	ROU	LBL	AGR	HEW	CSS	ZUR	TOU	LOM	Pts.
-	Mario Cipollini (ITA)	Acqua & Sapone–Cantina Tollo	100	20	DNS	DNS	DNS	DNS	DNS	DNS	0	DNS	120
-	Andrea Tafi (ITA)	Mapei–Quick-Step	DNS	100	9	DNS	0	0	DNS	DNS	DNS	DNS	109
-	Laurent Jalabert (FRA)	CSC–Tiscali	0	DNS	DNS	DNS	DNS	0	100	0	0	DNS	100

Key
Colour	Result
Gold	Winner
Silver	2nd place
Bronze	3rd place
Green	Top ten position
Blue	Other points position
Purple	Out of points, retired
Red	Did not start (DNS)

=== Teams ===
Points are awarded to the top 10 teams. Teams must start at least 8 races to be classified. The first 18 teams in world ranking must start in all races.

The points are awarded for every race using the following system:

Position	1st	2nd	3rd	4th	5th	6th	7th	8th	9th	10th
Points	12	9	8	7	6	5	4	3	2	1

Pos.	Team	MSR	ToF	ROU	LBL	AGR	HEW	CSS	ZUR	TOU	LOM	Pts.
1	Mapei–Quick-Step	0	12	3	12	9	4	8	9	8	6	71
2	Fassa Bortolo	1	0	0	8	8	8	2	12	0	12	51
3	Saeco–Longoni Sport	0	0	0	2	0	12	12	6	9	8	49
4	Domo–Farm Frites	12	9	12	1	0	6	0	0	5	0	45
5	Lotto–Adecco	5	6	6	7	6	0	6	0	3	DNS	39
