= 2001 Paris–Nice =

Race details
- Dates: 11–18 March 2001
- Stages: 7 + Prologue
- Distance: 1,211.7 km (752.9 mi)
- Winning time: 30h 32' 29"

Results
| Jersey awarded to the overall winner | Winner | Dario Frigo (ITA) | (Fassa Bortolo) |
| | Second | Raimondas Rumšas (LTU) | (Fassa Bortolo) |
| | Third | Peter Van Petegem (BEL) | (Mercury-Viatel) |

The 2001 Paris–Nice was the 59th edition of the Paris–Nice cycle race and was held from 11 March to 18 March 2001. The race started in Nevers and finished in Nice. The race was won by Dario Frigo of the Fassa Bortolo team.

== Teams ==
Twenty-three teams, containing a total of 184 riders, participated in the race:

- Team Telekom
- Jean Delatour
- iBanesto.com
- Bonjour
- Kelme–Costa Blanca
- Crédit Agricole
- CSC–Tiscali
- Fassa Bortolo
- Mapei–Quick-Step
- Cofidis
- Française des Jeux
- Festina
- Saeco
- BigMat–Auber 93
- Team Coast–Buffalo
- Euskaltel–Euskadi
- Domo–Farm Frites–Latexco
- Mercury–Viatel
- ONCE–Eroski
- Phonak
- Gerolsteiner

== Route ==
Stage characteristics and winners
| Stage | Date | Course | Distance | Type | Winner |
|---|---|---|---|---|---|
| P | 11 March | Nevers | 6.2 km (3.9 mi) | Individual time trial | Nico Mattan (BEL) |
| 1 | 12 March | Saint-Amand-Montrond to Clermont-Ferrand | 189.2 km (117.6 mi) | | Fabien De Waele (BEL) |
| 2 | 13 March | Clermont-Ferrand to Saint-Étienne | 195.4 km (121.4 mi) | | Peter Van Petegem (BEL) |
| 3 | 14 March | Saint-Étienne to Villeneuve-lès-Avignon | 217.9 km (135.4 mi) | | Jans Koerts (NED) |
| 4 | 15 March | Tarascon to Sisteron | 195.6 km (121.5 mi) | | Alex Zülle (SUI) |
| 5 | 16 March | Berre-l'Étang to Saint-Raphaël | 240.3 km (149.3 mi) | | Piotr Wadecki (POL) |
| 6 | 17 March | Nice to Col d'Èze | 10 km (6.2 mi) | Individual time trial | Dario Frigo (ITA) |
| 7 | 18 March | Nice to Nice | 157.1 km (97.6 mi) | | Fabrizio Guidi (ITA) |

== General classification ==
Final general classification

| Rank | Rider | Team | Time |
|---|---|---|---|
| 1 | Dario Frigo (ITA) | Fassa Bortolo | 30h 32' 29" |
| 2 | Raimondas Rumšas (LTU) | Fassa Bortolo | + 26" |
| 3 | Peter Van Petegem (BEL) | Mercury–Viatel | + 52" |
| 4 | David Moncoutié (FRA) | Cofidis | + 55" |
| 5 | José Azevedo (POR) | ONCE–Eroski | + 1' 01" |
| 6 | Mario Aerts (BEL) | Lotto–Adecco | + 1' 01" |
| 7 | Alexander Vinokourov (KAZ) | Team Telekom | + 1' 10" |
| 8 | Jörg Jaksche (GER) | ONCE–Eroski | + 1' 22" |
| 9 | Tobias Steinhauser (GER) | Gerolsteiner | + 1' 36" |
| 10 | Michele Bartoli (ITA) | Mapei–Quick-Step | + 1' 42" |
