= 2001 Tour de Romandie =

Race details
- Dates: 8–13 May 2001
- Stages: 5 + Prologue
- Distance: 719.3 km (447.0 mi)
- Winning time: 16h 59' 54"

Results
	Winner	Dario Frigo (ITA)	(Fassa Bortolo)
	Second	Félix García Casas (ESP)	(Festina)
	Third	Wladimir Belli (ITA)	(Fassa Bortolo)

The 2001 Tour de Romandie was the 55th edition of the Tour de Romandie cycle race and was held from 8 May to 13 May 2001. The race started in Pfaffnau and finished in Geneva. The race was won by Dario Frigo of the Fassa Bortolo team.

== General classification ==
Final general classification
Rank	Rider	Team	Time
1	Dario Frigo (ITA)	Fassa Bortolo	16h 59' 54"
2	Félix García Casas (ESP)	Festina	+ 43"
3	Wladimir Belli (ITA)	Fassa Bortolo	+ 1' 03"
4	Óscar Sevilla (ESP)	Kelme–Costa Blanca	+ 1' 40"
5	Gilberto Simoni (ITA)	Lampre–Daikin	+ 1' 47"
6	Sven Montgomery (SUI)	Française des Jeux	+ 1' 54"
7	David Plaza (ESP)	Festina	+ 2' 01"
8	Kurt Van De Wouwer (BEL)	Lotto–Adecco	+ 2' 08"
9	David Moncoutié (FRA)	Cofidis	+ 2' 36"
10	Oscar Camenzind (SUI)	Lampre–Daikin	+ 2' 38"

== Doping cases ==
Sergio Barbero and Laurent Chotard tested positive for EPO during the 2001 Tour de Romandie.
