= 2003 Volta a la Comunitat Valenciana =

Race details
- Dates: 25 February–1 March 2003
- Stages: 5
- Distance: 650.2 km (404.0 mi)
- Winning time: 15h 34' 07"

Results
	Winner	Dario Frigo (ITA)	(Fassa Bortolo)
	Second	David Bernabeu (ESP)	(Milaneza–MSS)
	Third	Javier Pascual Llorente (ESP)	(Kelme–Costa Blanca)

The 2003 Volta a la Comunitat Valenciana was the 61st edition of the Volta a la Comunitat Valenciana road cycling stage race, which was held from 25 February to 1 March 2003. The race started in San Vicente del Raspeig and finished in Valencia. The race was won by Dario Frigo of the Fassa Bortolo team.

== General classification ==
Final general classification

Rank	Rider	Team	Time
1	Dario Frigo (ITA)	Fassa Bortolo	15h 34' 07"
2	David Bernabeu (ESP)	Milaneza–MSS	+ 15"
3	Javier Pascual Llorente (ESP)	Kelme–Costa Blanca	s.t.
4	David Millar (GBR)	Cofidis	+ 24"
5	Xavier Florencio (ESP)	ONCE–Eroski	+ 36"
6	Alexandre Moos (SUI)	Phonak	+ 47"
7	Alex Zülle (SUI)	Team Coast	s.t.
8	Íñigo Cuesta (ESP)	Cofidis	+ 49"
9	Michael Boogerd (NED)	Rabobank	+ 51"
10	Francisco Pérez (ESP)	Milaneza–MSS	+ 52"
