= 2001 Tour of the Basque Country =

Race details
- Dates: 9–13 April 2001
- Stages: 5
- Distance: 752.2 km (467.4 mi)
- Winning time: 18h 42' 54"

Results
| | Winner | Raimondas Rumšas (LTU) | (Fassa Bortolo) |
| | Second | José Alberto Martínez (ESP) | (Euskaltel–Euskadi) |
| | Third | Marcos-Antonio Serrano (ESP) | (ONCE–Eroski) |

The 2001 Tour of the Basque Country was the 41st edition of the Tour of the Basque Country cycle race and was held from 9 April to 13 April 2001. The race started in Asteasu and finished at Lasarte-Oria. The race was won by Raimondas Rumšas of the Fassa Bortolo team.

== General classification ==
Final general classification

| Rank | Rider | Team | Time |
|---|---|---|---|
| 1 | Raimondas Rumšas (LTU) | Fassa Bortolo | 18h 42' 54" |
| 2 | José Alberto Martínez (ESP) | Euskaltel–Euskadi | + 5" |
| 3 | Marcos-Antonio Serrano (ESP) | ONCE–Eroski | + 7" |
| 4 | David Etxebarria (ESP) | Euskaltel–Euskadi | + 7" |
| 5 | Juan Carlos Domínguez (ESP) | iBanesto.com | + 16" |
| 6 | Francesco Casagrande (ITA) | Fassa Bortolo | + 17" |
| 7 | Michael Boogerd (NED) | Rabobank | + 18" |
| 8 | José Azevedo (POR) | ONCE–Eroski | + 20" |
| 9 | Alex Zülle (SUI) | Team Coast–Buffalo | + 22" |
| 10 | Dario Frigo (ITA) | Fassa Bortolo | + 36" |
