= 2003 Vuelta a España =

58th edition of the Vuelta a España

Race details
- Dates: 6–28 September
- Stages: 21
- Distance: 2,957 km (1,837 mi)
- Winning time: 69h 31' 52"

Results
Jersey awarded to the overall winner	Winner	Roberto Heras (ESP)	(U.S. Postal)
	Second	Isidro Nozal (ESP)	(ONCE–Eroski)
	Third	Alejandro Valverde (ESP)	(Communidad Valenciana-Kelme)
Jersey awarded to the points classification winner	Points	Erik Zabel (GER)	(Team Telekom)
Jersey awarded to the mountains classification winner	Mountains	Félix Cárdenas (COL)	(Cage Maglierie)
Jersey awarded to the combination classification winner	Combination	Alejandro Valverde (ESP)	(Kelme–Costa Blanca)
	Team	(Spain) iBanesto.com	

The 58th edition of the Vuelta a España (Tour of Spain), a long-distance bicycle stage race and one of the three grand tours, was held from 6 September to 28 September 2003. It consisted of 21 stages covering a total of 2,957 km (1,837 mi), and was won by Roberto Heras of the U.S. Postal cycling team.

Isidro Nozal lead the general classification for much of the race until succumbing to the pressure posed by Roberto Heras who closed the gap to Nozal over the final days and took the jersey in the final time trial. The points classification was won by Erik Zabel from Germany, the mountains classification was won by Félix Cárdenas from Colombia and the combination classification was won by Alejandro Valverde. iBanesto.com was the winner of the team ranking. Alessandro Petacchi, an Italian sprinter won five stages.

== Route ==
List of stages
Stage	Date	Course	Distance	Type	Winner
1	6 September	Gijón to Gijón	28 km (17 mi)	Team time trial	ONCE–Eroski
2	7 September	Gijón to Cangas de Onís	148 km (92 mi)		Luis Pérez (ESP)
3	8 September	Cangas de Onís to Santander	154.3 km (96 mi)		Alessandro Petacchi (ITA)
4	9 September	Santander to Burgos	151 km (94 mi)		Unai Etxebarria (VEN)
5	10 September	Soria to Zaragoza	166.7 km (104 mi)		Alessandro Petacchi (ITA)
6	11 September	Zaragoza to Zaragoza	43.8 km (27 mi)	Individual time trial	Isidro Nozal (ESP)
7	12 September	Huesca to Cauterets (France)	190 km (118 mi)		Michael Rasmussen (DEN)
8	13 September	Cauterets to Pla de Beret/Val d'Aran	166 km (103 mi)		Joaquim Rodríguez (ESP)
9	14 September	Vielha to Envalira (Andorra)	174.8 km (109 mi)		Alejandro Valverde (ESP)
10	15 September	Andorra to Sabadell	194 km (121 mi)		Erik Zabel (GER)
	16 September	Rest day			
11	17 September	Utiel to Cuenca	162 km (101 mi)		Erik Zabel (GER)
12	18 September	Cuenca to Albacete	168.8 km (105 mi)		Alessandro Petacchi (ITA)
13	19 September	Albacete to Albacete	53.3 km (33 mi)	Individual time trial	Isidro Nozal (ESP)
14	20 September	Albacete to Valdepeñas	167.4 km (104 mi)		Alessandro Petacchi (ITA)
15	21 September	Valdepeñas to La Pandera	172.1 km (107 mi)		Alejandro Valverde (ESP)
	22 September			Rest day	
16	23 September	Jaén to Sierra Nevada	162 km (101 mi)		Félix Cárdenas (COL)
17	24 September	Granada to Córdoba	188.4 km (117 mi)		David Millar (GBR)
18	25 September	Las Rozas to Las Rozas	143.8 km (89 mi)		Pedro Díaz Lobato (ESP)
19	26 September	Alcobendas to Collado Villalba	164 km (102 mi)		Filippo Simeoni (ITA)
20	27 September	San Lorenzo de El Escorial to Alto de Abantos	11.2 km (7 mi)	Individual time trial	Roberto Heras (ESP)
21	28 September	Madrid to Madrid	148.5 km (92 mi)		Alessandro Petacchi (ITA)
	Total		2,925 km (1,818 mi)		

== Jersey Progress ==
Stage	Winner	General classification	Points classification	Mountains classification	Combination classification	Team classification
1	ONCE–Eroski	Igor González de Galdeano	Igor González de Galdeano	Jan Hruška	Igor González de Galdeano	ONCE–Eroski
2	Luis Pérez	Joaquim Rodríguez	Joaquim Rodríguez	Luis Pérez	Luis Pérez	ONCE–Eroski
3	Alessandro Petacchi	Joaquim Rodríguez	Joaquim Rodríguez	Luis Pérez	Luis Pérez	ONCE–Eroski
4	Unai Etxebarria	Isidro Nozal	David Etxebarria	Félix Cárdenas	Isidro Nozal	ONCE–Eroski
5	Alessandro Petacchi	Isidro Nozal	Alessandro Petacchi	Félix Cárdenas	Isidro Nozal	ONCE–Eroski
6	Isidro Nozal	Isidro Nozal	Alessandro Petacchi	Félix Cárdenas	Isidro Nozal	ONCE–Eroski
7	Michael Rasmussen	Isidro Nozal	Alessandro Petacchi	Félix Cárdenas	Isidro Nozal	ONCE–Eroski
8	Joaquim Rodríguez	Isidro Nozal	Joaquim Rodríguez	Joan Horrach	Isidro Nozal	ONCE–Eroski
9	Alejandro Valverde	Isidro Nozal	Isidro Nozal	Félix Cárdenas	Isidro Nozal	ONCE–Eroski
10	Erik Zabel	Isidro Nozal	Alessandro Petacchi	Félix Cárdenas	Alejandro Valverde	ONCE–Eroski
11	Erik Zabel	Isidro Nozal	Erik Zabel	Félix Cárdenas	Alejandro Valverde	ONCE–Eroski
12	Alessandro Petacchi	Isidro Nozal	Erik Zabel	Félix Cárdenas	Isidro Nozal	ONCE–Eroski
13	Isidro Nozal	Isidro Nozal	Erik Zabel	Félix Cárdenas	Isidro Nozal	ONCE–Eroski
14	Alessandro Petacchi	Isidro Nozal	Alessandro Petacchi	Félix Cárdenas	Isidro Nozal	ONCE–Eroski
15	Alejandro Valverde	Isidro Nozal	Erik Zabel	Félix Cárdenas	Alejandro Valverde	ONCE–Eroski
16	Félix Cárdenas	Isidro Nozal	Erik Zabel	Félix Cárdenas	Alejandro Valverde	ONCE–Eroski
17	David Millar	Isidro Nozal	Erik Zabel	Félix Cárdenas	Alejandro Valverde	ONCE–Eroski
18	Pedro Diaz Lobato	Isidro Nozal	Erik Zabel	Félix Cárdenas	Alejandro Valverde	ONCE–Eroski
19	Filippo Simeoni	Isidro Nozal	Erik Zabel	Félix Cárdenas	Alejandro Valverde	ONCE–Eroski
20	Roberto Heras	Roberto Heras	Alejandro Valverde	Félix Cárdenas	Alejandro Valverde	iBanesto.com
21	Alessandro Petacchi	Roberto Heras	Erik Zabel	Félix Cárdenas	Alejandro Valverde	iBanesto.com
Final		Roberto Heras	Erik Zabel	Félix Cárdenas	Alejandro Valverde	iBanesto.com

== General classification ==
Rank	Rider	Team	Time
1	(Spain) Roberto Heras	U.S. Postal	69h31'52"
2	(Spain) Isidro Nozal	ONCE–Eroski	'28"
3	(Spain) Alejandro Valverde	Kelme–Costa Blanca	2'25"
4	(Spain) Igor González de Galdeano	ONCE–Eroski	3'27"
5	(Spain) Francisco Mancebo	iBanesto.com	4'47"
6	(Spain) Manuel Beltrán	U.S. Postal	5'51"
7	(Denmark) Michael Rasmussen	Rabobank	5'56"
8	(Colombia) Félix Cárdenas	Labarca 2-Cafe Baque	6'33"
9	(Spain) Unai Osa	iBanesto.com	6'52"
10	(Spain) Luis Pérez	Cofidis	7'56"
11	(Spain) Santos González	Domina Vacanze–Elitron	9'08"
12	(Spain) Óscar Sevilla	Kelme–Costa Blanca	9'52"
13	(Italy) Michele Scarponi	Domina Vacanze–Elitron	10'13"
14	(Spain) Marcos Serrano	Team ONCE	12'51"
15	(Spain) Félix Garcia	Team Bianchi	14'18"
16	(Spain) Txema Del Olmo	Milaneza–MSS	14'38"
17	(Spain) Óscar Pereiro	Phonak Hearing Systems	17'05"
18	(Spain) Iker Flores	Euskaltel–Euskadi	18'31"
19	(Italy) Guido Trentin	Cofidis	29'34"
20	(Spain) Josep Jufre	Colchon Relax–Fuenlabrada	33'30"
21	(Italy) Dario Frigo	Fassa Bortolo	40'19"
22	(Spain) Íñigo Cuesta	Cofidis	41'18"
23	(Italy) Leonardo Piepoli	iBanesto.com	46'45"
24	(Spain) Manuel Calvente	Team CSC	47'54"
25	(Spain) Aitor Osa	iBanesto.com	49'39"
