= 1999 PruTour =

Race details
- Dates: 23–29 May 1999
- Stages: 7
- Winning time: 29h 32' 26"

Results
	Winner	Marc Wauters (BEL)	(Rabobank)
	Second	Benoît Joachim (LUX)	(U.S. Postal Service)
	Third	Bjørnar Vestøl (NOR)	(Acceptcard)

The 1999 PruTour was the second edition of the Prudential Tour of Britain cycle race and was held from 23 May to 29 May 1999. The race started in Westminster and finished in Edinburgh. The race was won by Marc Wauters of the Rabobank team.

== Teams ==
Eighteen teams of up to six riders started the race:

- Crédit Agricole
- Rabobank
- U.S. Postal Service
- BigMat–Auber 93
- Post Swiss Team
- Acceptcard
- Linda McCartney On Tour
- Mróz
- Amore & Vita–Giubileo 2000–Beretta
- Team Men's Health
- Harrods
- home–Jack & Jones
- Great Britain
- Australia
- China
- Denmark
- Ireland
- South Africa

== Route ==
Stage characteristics and winners
Stage	Date	Course	Distance	Type	Winner
1	23 May	Westminster to Westminster	81 km (50.3 mi)		Léon van Bon (NED)
2a	24 May	Medway to Portsmouth	179 km (111.2 mi)		Julian Dean (NZL)
2b	24 May	Portsmouth	6.7 km (4.2 mi)	Individual time trial	Chris Boardman (GBR)
3	25 May	Winchester to Bristol	167 km (103.8 mi)		Benoît Joachim (LUX)
4	26 May	Bristol to Swansea	172 km (106.9 mi)		Raimondas Rumšas (LTU)
5	27 May	Swansea to Birmingham	214 km (133.0 mi)		Stuart O'Grady (AUS)
6	28 May	Liverpool to Blackpool	158 km (98.2 mi)		George Hincapie (USA)
7a	29 May	Carlisle to Edinburgh	147.5 km (91.7 mi)		Rob Hayles (GBR)
7b	29 May	Edinburgh to Edinburgh	40 km (24.9 mi)		Julian Dean (NZL)

== General classification ==
Final general classification

Rank	Rider	Team	Time
1	Marc Wauters (BEL)	Rabobank	29h 32' 26"
2	Benoît Joachim (LUX)	U.S. Postal Service	+ 2"
3	Bjørnar Vestøl (NOR)	Acceptcard	+ 1' 22"
4	Jens Voigt (GER)	Crédit Agricole	+ 1' 37"
5	Raimondas Rumšas (LTU)	Mróz	+ 1' 42"
6	Patrick Jonker (NED)	Rabobank	+ 1' 57"
7	Jonathan Vaughters (USA)	U.S. Postal Service	+ 1' 59"
8	Nicolaj Bo Larsen (DEN)	home–Jack & Jones	+ 2' 29"
9	Lylian Lebreton (FRA)	BigMat–Auber 93	+ 2' 34"
10	Massimo Gimondi (ITA)	Amore & Vita–Giubileo 2000–Beretta	+ 3' 15"
