= Raimondas Rumšas =

Lithuanian cyclist

Personal information
- Full name: Raimondas Rumšas
- Born: January 14, 1972 (age 54) Šilutė, Lithuanian SSR, Soviet Union
- Height: 175 cm (5 ft 9 in)
- Weight: 140 lb (64 kg)

Cycling career
- Sport: Cycling
- Current team: Retired
- Discipline: Road
- Role: Rider

Professional teams
- 1996–1999: Mróz
- 2000–2001: Fassa Bortolo
- 2002–2003: Lampre-Farnese Vini
- 2004: Acqua & Sapone

Major wins
- Stage races Tour of the Basque Country (2001) One-day races and Classics Giro di Lombardia (2000) National Road Race Championships (2001) National Time Trial Championships (1999, 2005)

Raimondas Rumšas (born 14 January 1972) is a Lithuanian former professional road bicycle racer. He came third in the 2002 Tour de France but was implicated in a doping scandal.

== Doping ==
On the day of Rumšas' third-place finish in the 2002 Tour de France, police discovered corticoids, erythropoietin, testosterone, growth hormones and anabolic steroids in the car of his wife, Edita Rumšienė. She was jailed for several months before being released, despite her claim that the drugs were for her mother-in-law.

In May 2003 Rumšas tested positive for the banned endurance enhancer erythropoietin (EPO). He had just finished the 2003 Giro d'Italia, where he ranked sixth. Rumšas received a one-year ban. He briefly returned to cycling in 2004 with Acqua & Sapone team for the Gran Premio Città di Camaiore.

In June 2005, Rumšas was arrested before his trial by the Bonneville court. In January 2006, he and his wife received four-month suspended prison sentences for the import of prohibited doping substances. Polish doctor Krzysztof Ficek was handed a 12-month suspended sentence for prescribing the drugs.

== Major results ==
1992
2nd Overall Tour de Pologne

1st Stage 3

1994
1st Overall Course de Solidarność et des Champions Olympiques
1996
3rd Overall Course de Solidarność et des Champions Olympiques

1st Stage 3

9th Overall Tour de Pologne
9th Route Adélie de Vitré
1997
4th Overall Course de Solidarność et des Champions Olympiques

1st Stage 5

9th Grote Prijs Jef Scherens
1998
National Road Championships

2nd Road race
3rd Time trial

2nd Overall Hessen Rundfahrt

1st Stage 4

4th Overall Course de Solidarność et des Champions Olympiques
5th Overall Tour de Pologne
7th Overall Peace Race

1st Stages 1 & 4

7th Lancaster Classic
9th Road race, UCI Road World Road Championships
1999
National Road Championships

1st Time trial
4th Road race

1st Stage 5 Circuit des Mines
2nd Overall Peace Race

1st Stage 3

3rd Overall Giro della Provincia di Lucca
4th Overall Tour de Pologne

1st Stages 6 & 7

5th Overall PruTour

1st Stage 4

2000
1st Giro di Lombardia
2nd Coppa Bernocchi
4th Overall Vuelta a Burgos
5th Overall Vuelta a España
5th Gran Premio Città di Camaiore
9th Overall Tour de Romandie
2001
National Road Championships

1st Road race
3rd Time trial

1st Overall Tour of the Basque Country

1st Stage 5b (ITT)

2nd Overall Paris–Nice
2nd Giro dell'Appennino
3rd Overall Giro del Trentino
3rd Overall Route du Sud
3rd Gran Premio di Chiasso
6th Liège–Bastogne–Liège
7th Overall Settimana Internazionale di Coppi e Bartali
9th Trofeo Laigueglia
2002
2nd Overall Bicicleta Vasca
3rd Overall Tour de France
2003
1st Stage 1b (TTT) Settimana Internazionale di Coppi e Bartali
~~6th Overall Giro d'Italia~~
2005
National Road Championships

1st Time trial
2nd Road race

2006
National Road Championships

2nd Road race
2nd Time trial

=== Grand Tour General classification results timeline ===
Grand Tour	2000	2001	2002	2003
Giro d'Italia	—	—	—	~~6~~
Tour de France	—	—	3	—
Vuelta a España	5	—	—	—

Legend
—	Did not compete
~~No.~~	Voided result

Awards
Preceded by (Lithuania) Rasa Polikevičiūtė	Best Lithuanian sportsman of the Year; 2002	Succeeded by (Lithuania) Šarūnas Jasikevičius
