= Unai Etxebarria =

Venezuelan cyclist

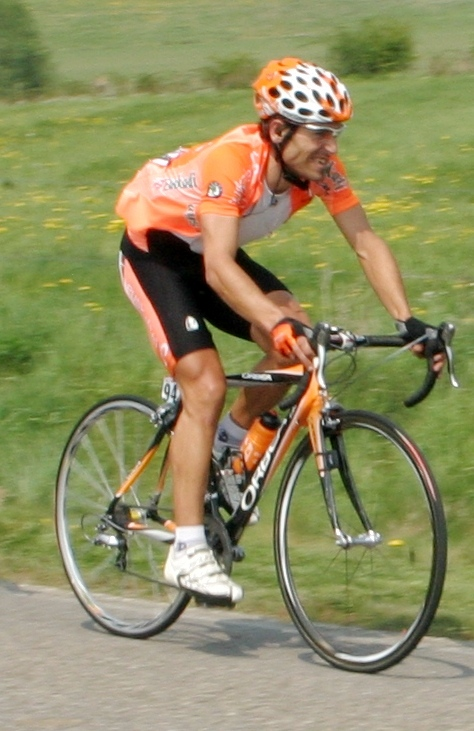
- Etxebarria in 2007

Personal information
- Full name: Unai Etxebarria Arana
- Born: November 21, 1972 (age 53) Caracas, Venezuela
- Height: 1.81 m (5 ft 11 in)
- Weight: 68 kg (150 lb)

Cycling career
- Sport: Cycling
- Current team: Retired
- Discipline: Road
- Role: Rider

Amateur teams
- 1994: Artiach–Nabisco (stagiaire)
- 1995: Artiach–Chiquilin (stagiaire)

Professional team
- 1996–2007: Equipo Euskadi

Major wins
- Grand Tours Vuelta a España 1 individual stage (2003)

Unai Etxebarria Arana (born November 21, 1972) is a Venezuelan retired road racing cyclist, who rode professionally between 1996 and 2007, entirely for the Euskaltel–Euskadi team. He is of Basque heritage, hence his ability to ride for Euskaltel.

He is not related to former teammate David Etxebarria.

== Major results ==
1998
Volta a Portugal

1st Stages 7 & 12

2000
1st GP Primavera
1st Stage 1 Setmana Catalana de Ciclisme
2001
1st Stage 3 Critérium du Dauphiné Libéré
2002
2nd La Flèche Wallonne
2003
1st Stage 4 Vuelta a España
4th La Flèche Wallonne
2004
1st GP Llodio
1st Trofeo Calvià
2006
1st Mountains classification Euskal Bizikleta
2007
1st Trofeo Calvià
