= Unai Osa =

Spanish cyclist

Personal information
- Full name: Unai Osa Eizaguirre
- Born: 12 June 1975 (age 51) Zestoa, Spain
- Height: 1.78 m (5 ft 10 in)
- Weight: 65 kg (143 lb; 10 st 3 lb)

Cycling career
- Sport: Cycling
- Current team: Retired
- Discipline: Road
- Role: Rider

Professional teams
- 1997–2005: Banesto
- 2006: Liberty Seguros–Würth

Unai Osa Eizaguirre (born 12 June 1975 in Zestoa) is a Spanish former road bicycle racer. He is the younger brother of Aitor Osa. He was involved in the Operación Puerto doping case.

== Major results ==
1993
1st Road race, National Junior Road Championships
1997
6th Overall Troféu Joaquim Agostinho
6th GP Villafranca de Ordizia
8th Overall Vuelta a La Rioja
1999
1st Overall Tour de l'Avenir
1st Classique des Alpes
2nd Subida a Txitxarro
3rd Overall Euskal Bizikleta
7th Overall Critérium du Dauphiné Libéré
9th Overall Tour of Galicia
10th Overall Vuelta a Andalucía
2000
4th Overall Giro del Trentino
2001
3rd Overall Giro d'Italia
9th Overall Volta a Catalunya
2003
9th Overall Vuelta a España

=== Grand Tour general classification results timeline ===
Grand Tour	2000	2001	2002	2003	2004	2005	2006
Giro d'Italia	DNF	3	—	—	—	16	18
Tour de France	—	—	18	—	—	—	—
/ Vuelta a España	56	22	—	9	21	18	—

Legend
—	Did not compete
DNF	Did not finish

== See also ==
- List of doping cases in cycling
