= Luis Pérez Rodríguez =

Spanish cyclist (born 1974)

Luis Pérez
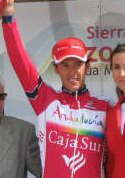
- Pérez at the 2007 Clásica de Alcobendas

Personal information
- Full name: Luis Pérez Rodríguez
- Born: 16 June 1974 (age 52) Torrelaguna, Spain

Cycling career
- Sport: Cycling
- Discipline: Road
- Role: Rider

Professional teams
- 1995–1999: ONCE–Eroski
- 2000: Vitalicio Seguros
- 2001: Festina
- 2002–2003: Team Coast
- 2003–2006: Cofidis
- 2007: Andalucía–CajaSur

Major wins
- Vuelta a España, 2 stages

Luis Pérez Rodríguez (born 16 June 1974 in Torrelaguna, Spain) is retired road racing cyclist. He competed professionally between 1995 and 2007, and last rode for the Andalucía–CajaSur team.

During his career, Pérez scored two stage wins in Grand Tour events, both in the Vuelta a España. During his last season with Andalucía–CajaSur, he scored a 1st Overall in the Clásica Internacional de Alcobendas, a three-day stage race. In November 2007, before retiring from Andalucía–CajaSur, Pérez won the first annual Criterium Ciudad de Jaén race, an unofficial two-day competition held during the off-season of the UCI World Tour circuit.

== Major results ==
1994
8th, Overall, Vuelta a España
2001
10th, Overall, Vuelta Ciclista de Chile
2003
10th, Overall, Vuelta a España

1st, Stage 2

2004
9th, Overall, Vuelta a España
2006
10th, Overall, Vuelta a España
2007
1st, Overall, Clásica Internacional de Alcobendas

1st, Stage 1

1st, Stage 18, Vuelta a España
