= Gorka González =

Spanish cyclist

Personal information
- Full name: Gorka González Larrañaga
- Born: 28 September 1977 (age 49)

Cycling career
- Sport: Cycling
- Current team: Retired
- Discipline: Road
- Role: Rider

Professional team
- 2002–2006: Euskaltel–Euskadi

Gorka González Larrañaga (born 28 September 1977) is a Spanish former professional road bicycle racer, who rode professionally between 2002 and 2006, entirely for the Euskaltel–Euskadi team. González was the only one out of 189 enlisted riders who was not allowed to start in the 2004 Tour de France after failing a health-test prior to the race, due to a high hematocrit value. He was suspended for two weeks. His team Euskadi was not allowed a substitute and started that year's Tour, which included a Team Time Trial, with 8 riders.

== Major results ==
2005
1st Stage 5 Vuelta a Burgos
