= Dario Frigo =

Italian road bicycle racer (born 1973)

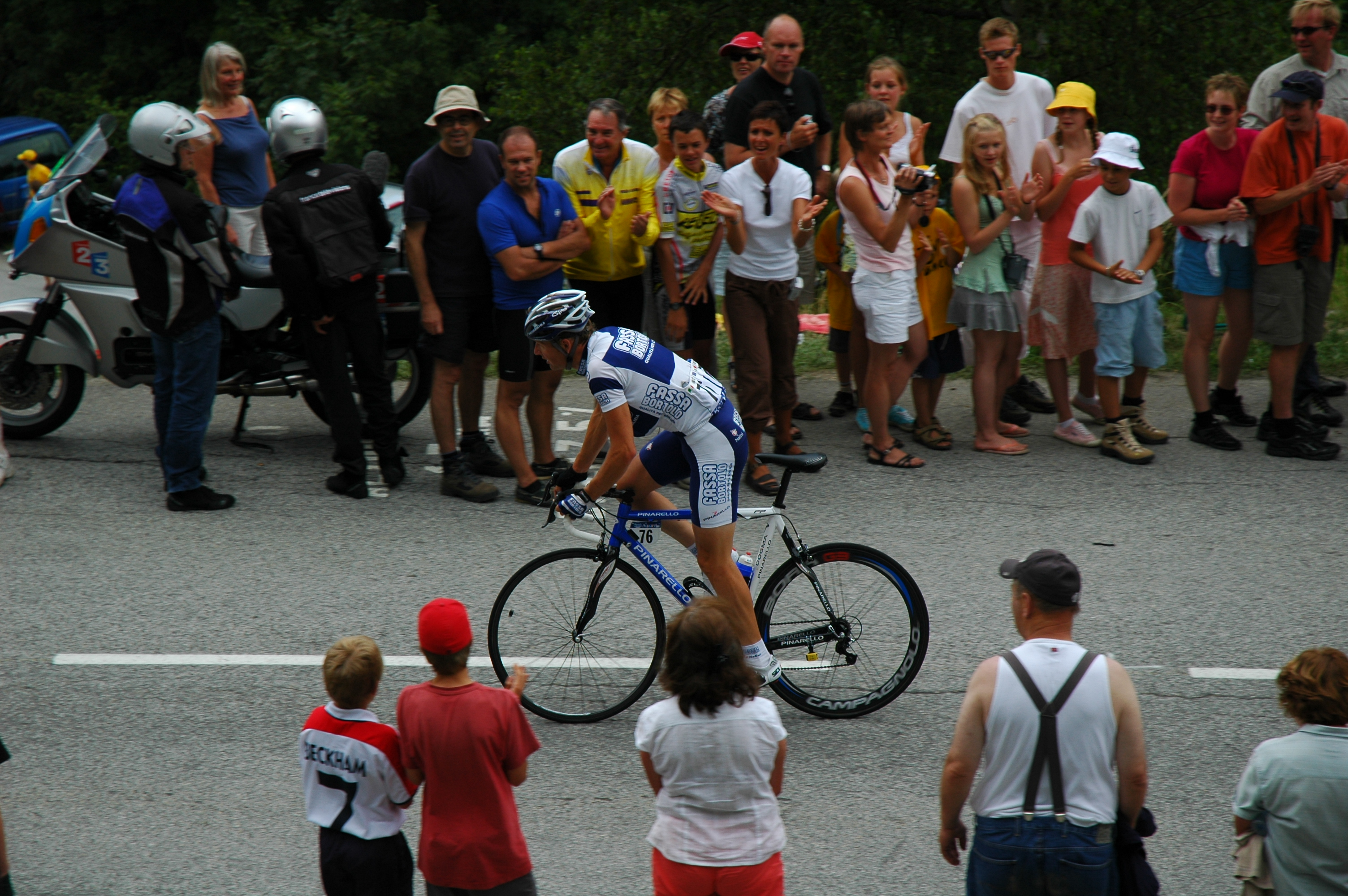
- Frigo at the 2005 Tour de France

Personal information
- Full name: Dario Frigo
- Born: 18 September 1973 (age 53) Saronno, Italy
- Height: 1.81 m (5 ft 11 1/2 in)
- Weight: 66 kg (146 lb; 10 st 6 lb)

Cycling career
- Sport: Cycling
- Discipline: Road
- Role: Rider
- Rider type: All rounder

Amateur team
- 1995: Mercatone Uno–Saeco (stagiaire)

Professional teams
- 1996–1999: Saeco–AS Juvenes San Marino
- 2000–2001: Fassa Bortolo
- 2002: Tacconi Sport
- 2003–2005: Fassa Bortolo

Major wins
- Grand Tours Tour de France 1 individual stage (2002) Giro d'Italia 2 individual stages (2001, 2003) Stage races Tour de Romandie (2001, 2002) Paris–Nice (2001) One-day races and Classics National Time Trial Championships (2002) Züri-Metzgete (2002)

Dario Frigo (born 18 September 1973) is an Italian former professional road bicycle racer.

== Career ==
Frigo's transition to professional cycling began at the 1995 Giro del Veneto, riding as a stagiaire for Mercatone Uno–Saeco. In 1996, he was officially signed to Saeco on a four-year contract. In 1999, he obtained his first victory at the Dekra Open, in Germany. In 2000, he joined the Fassa Bortolo team and achieved success, winning the Giro di Campania, as well as a stage of the Giro del Trentino. He also finished second overall in the Tour de Suisse. More success came for him in early 2001, when he won the time trial at the Col d'Èze and the overall classification of Paris–Nice, as well as the general classification of the Tour de Romandie.

He entered the 2001 Giro d'Italia and was one of the favorites to win. In the prologue, he finished second to Rik Verbrugghe and after the fourth stage, he took the race lead, which he held for nine days, until losing it to Gilberto Simoni on the 13th stage. The gap between the two was very small. On 3 June, Frigo won the 15th stage, a time trial. However, Simoni managed to maintain his lead. On 7 June, the stage was canceled following searches of the NAS in the hotels in Sanremo, where the teams participating in the Giro typically stayed.

During the searches of Frigo's vials, doping substances belonging to him were found, but he claimed to have never used them. The next morning, Dario did not leave Busto Arsizio because he was fired by his team. Later, it was discovered that Frigo had also been scammed because the vial labels did not match the contents of the products. However, Frigo had tried to procure an illicit product, and so he was sentenced to a 6-month ban until 8 March 2002.

In 2002, he was hired by Tacconi Sport and on his return to racing, in Paris–Nice, he won the hardest stage at the Col d'Èze. He then won a stage and the final classification of the Tour de Romandie. He returned to the Giro d'Italia, but while still managing to stay with the leaders, he finished with a modest 10th place in the standings, 11'50" off the winner Paolo Savoldelli. After the Giro, he won the national time trial championship and started the Tour de France, where he won the 17th stage in Megève. After finishing the Tour, he won Subida a Urkiola and the World Cup Classic Zurich Metzgete, in August, placing 5th in the UCI World Ranking.

In 2003 he started strong and in the first half of the season he won 6 races: a stage at Paris–Nice, a stage and the final classification both at the Volta a la Comunitat Valenciana and at the Setmana Catalana and a stage in the Giro that placed him in 7th overall. Towards the end of the season, he competed in the Vuelta a España, finishing in twenty-first place. He also took part in the World Championships in both the individual time trial and road race in Hamilton. He ended the season with a third place in the Giro di Lombardia and finished 14th in the UCI ranking.

2004 was a poor year for Frigo: he was unable to race for three months due to physical problems, and facing a slow and difficult recovery, won no races. In spite of everything, for the second consecutive year he was selected for the World Championships in Verona.

In 2005, Frigo had another bad season: as he only won one stage in the Tour de Luxembourg and in July during the Tour de France, he and his wife were stopped by the French police after ten doses of EPO were found. After being excluded from the Tour de France, he announced his decision to end his career.

== Doping investigation ==
Following the statements made by Dario Frigo, the Police Chief Jean-Philippe Casano carried out in-depth investigations and testified to the Judges as follows: "The inquiry diligently complies with your instructions allows us to verify and validate the assertions contained in Dario Frigo's letter, in particular identifying the different protagonists that he puts in question in a doping organization within his old team Fassa Bortolo, now dissolved." (2006/7 Judicial Police Report). Cyril Troussard (C.P.L.D) declares: "the method of doping organized within the Fassa Bortolo in 2003, described by Frigo in his letter is comparable with the Festina method" (2006/7 Judicial Police Report). M. Alain Garnier (A.M.A.) validated Frigo's statements on the existence of an omerta in the sports world concerning doping practices within teams such as the Fassa Bortolo. (Minutes 2006/7 of the Judicial Police). On 15 September 2008, at the Albertville Court, Frigo and his wife were sentenced to a 6-month suspension. The Public Prosecutor appealed. On 23 April 2009 the Chambéry Appeal Court reduced the sentence of both to 3 months suspended.

The Chambéry Court, in the reasons for the sentence, states: "The investigations carried out on a rogatory commission have made it possible to give credibility to the architecture of the system denounced by Dario Frigo, that is a practice of doping athletes institutionalized and organized by the Fassa Bortolo team leaders even if the instructor magistrate complained about the absence of any collaboration with the Italian authorities. "The pressures suffered by Dario Frigo to bow to new systematic doping practices institutionalized within his team are clear". The humiliations and harassment of the Fassa Bortolo executives particularly hit a runner whose physical and psychological health had been fragile for years of doping in a "scandalous system far from sport ethics". "(Dossier nr. 08 / 00899 of 23/4/09 Chambéry Appeal Court). And the conditioning suffered by the rider in a proven environment in which the use of doping is defined as institutionalized has justified "the gentler application of the criminal law" (Dossier nr. 08/00899). During the interrogation D96 in front of the Police Chief Jean-Philippe Casano, Ferretti declares: "the (Frigo) était payé près de ... euros par a et à ce tarif qui, an employer a le droit de faire pression ...". The Ravenna Court branch of Lugo established that the Fassa Bortolo did not close due to Dario Frigo case.

Although the judges recognized the "doping organized and institutionalized" in 2010 at the Court of Treviso, the Fassa Bortolo filed a civil lawsuit against Dario Frigo for the injured image of Fassa Spa, for compensation of the patrimonial and non-patrimonial damages suffered by Fassa Bortolo and quality of the author of the declarations reported in the newspaper il Gazzettino, where he remained for a month, with consequent pecuniary reparation. With sentence n. 2146/15 of 5/10/2015, the Court of Treviso rejects the request for damages from Fassa Bortolo. The judge of the Treviso Court declares: "Faced with the investigations carried out by the French authority, the "Fassa Bortolo has proved nothing about the falsity of what Frigo said, given that the apparent formal rigor towards the use of illicit substances taken by the company Fassa Bortolo was then denied by the choices made by the company itself", in particular, it cannot be overlooked that it was made use of by a sports director, Giancarlo Ferretti, with not particularly clear background, having himself proceeded to hire riders already convicted of doping or having worked to obtain the collaboration for Fassa Bortolo "and for payment "in black", by Dr. Marcos Maynar, known for his experiments and the use of prohibited substances".

Dr. Marcos Maynar was present at the retreats of Castrocaro Terme (11/2002) and Marina di Bibbona (01/2003), at the Puig Trophy, Vuelta Valenciana, Semana Catalana, Vuelta al Pais Vasco, Vuelta a Catalunya, Tour de Luxembourg, Deutschland Tour, Vuelta a Burgos and Vuelta a España '03 (70 days of competitions c.ca). Fassa Bortolo appealed to the Venice Court. On 30 July 2018 the appeal was rejected. In March 2019 the deadlines for a possible appeal to the Court of Cassation expired.

== Major results ==
1991
3rd Road race, National Junior Road Championships
1993
1st Stage 4 Giro della Valle d'Aosta
2nd Coppa della Pace
1994
1st Gran Premio di Poggiana
2nd Overall Giro della Valle d'Aosta

1st Stage 4

1st Coppa Città di San Daniele
2nd GP Capodarco
1995
3rd GP Industrie del Marmo
5th Road race, European Under-23 Road Championships
1997
6th Trofeo Pantalica
1998
2nd Overall Giro del Trentino
3rd Trofeo Melinda
5th Overall Setmana Catalana de Ciclisme
5th Trofeo Forla de Navarra
6th Giro del Piemonte
6th Klasika Primavera
9th Overall Tour of Galicia
9th Züri-Metzgete
1999
1st Overall Dekra Open

1st Stage 1

2nd Overall Vuelta a Burgos
2nd Luk-Cup Bühl
3rd Gran Premio Bruno Beghelli
4th Overall Regio-Tour
6th Giro del Lazio
7th Overall Paris–Nice
2000
1st Giro di Campania
1st Stage 4 Giro del Trentino
2nd Overall Tour de Suisse
4th GP Industria & Commercio di Prato
6th Time trial, UCI Road World Championships
7th Overall Settimana Internazionale di Coppi e Bartali
7th Giro dell'Emilia
8th La Flèche Wallonne
8th Trofeo Melinda
9th Overall Paris–Nice
2001
1st Overall Paris–Nice

1st Stage 6 (ITT)

1st Overall Tour de Romandie
Giro d'Italia

1st Stage 15 (ITT)
Held after Stages 4–12

2nd Overall Settimana Internazionale di Coppi e Bartali
2nd Gran Premio di Chiasso
5th Overall Giro Riviera Ligure Ponente
7th La Flèche Wallonne
10th Overall Tour of the Basque Country
2002
National Road Championships

1st Time trial
2nd Road race

1st Overall Tour de Romandie

1st Stage 2

1st Züri-Metzgete
1st Subida a Urkiola
1st Stage 17 Tour de France
2nd Luk-Cup Bühl
5th Clásica de San Sebastián
7th La Flèche Wallonne
7th Giro del Lazio
8th Overall Paris–Nice

1st Stage 6

9th Giro di Lombardia
10th Overall Giro d'Italia
2003
1st Overall Volta a la Comunitat Valenciana

1st Stage 1 (ITT)

1st Overall Setmana Catalana de Ciclisme

1st Stage 4

1st Stage 4 (ITT) Paris–Nice
3rd Giro di Lombardia
4th Overall Tour of the Basque Country
5th Time trial, UCI Road World Championships
7th Overall Giro d'Italia

1st Stage 18

2004
2nd Coppa Ugo Agostoni
3rd Trofeo Melinda
3rd Giro delle Colline del Chianti
7th Giro dell'Emilia
8th Giro di Lombardia
8th Tre Valli Varesine
8th Giro del Lazio
2005
1st Stage 3 Tour de Luxembourg
4th Trofeo Laigueglia

=== Grand Tour general classification results timeline ===
Grand Tour	1996	1997	1998	1999	2000	2001	2002	2003	2004	2005
Giro d'Italia	84	14	42	DNF	13	DNF	10	7	—	—
Tour de France	—	DNF	—	—	—	—	25	—	—	DNF
/ Vuelta a España	—	—	DNF	DNF	—	—	—	21	—	—

Legend
—	Did not compete
DNF	Did not finish

== See also ==
- List of doping cases in cycling
- List of sportspeople sanctioned for doping offences
