= Fassa Bortolo =

Italian cycling team

Team information
- UCI code: FAS
- Registered: Italy
- Founded: 2000
- Disbanded: 2005
- Discipline: Road

Key personnel
- General manager: Giancarlo Ferretti

Team name history
- 2005 – ProTour 2000–2004 Div. I: Fassa Bortolo (FAS); Fassa Bortolo (FAS)
Jersey

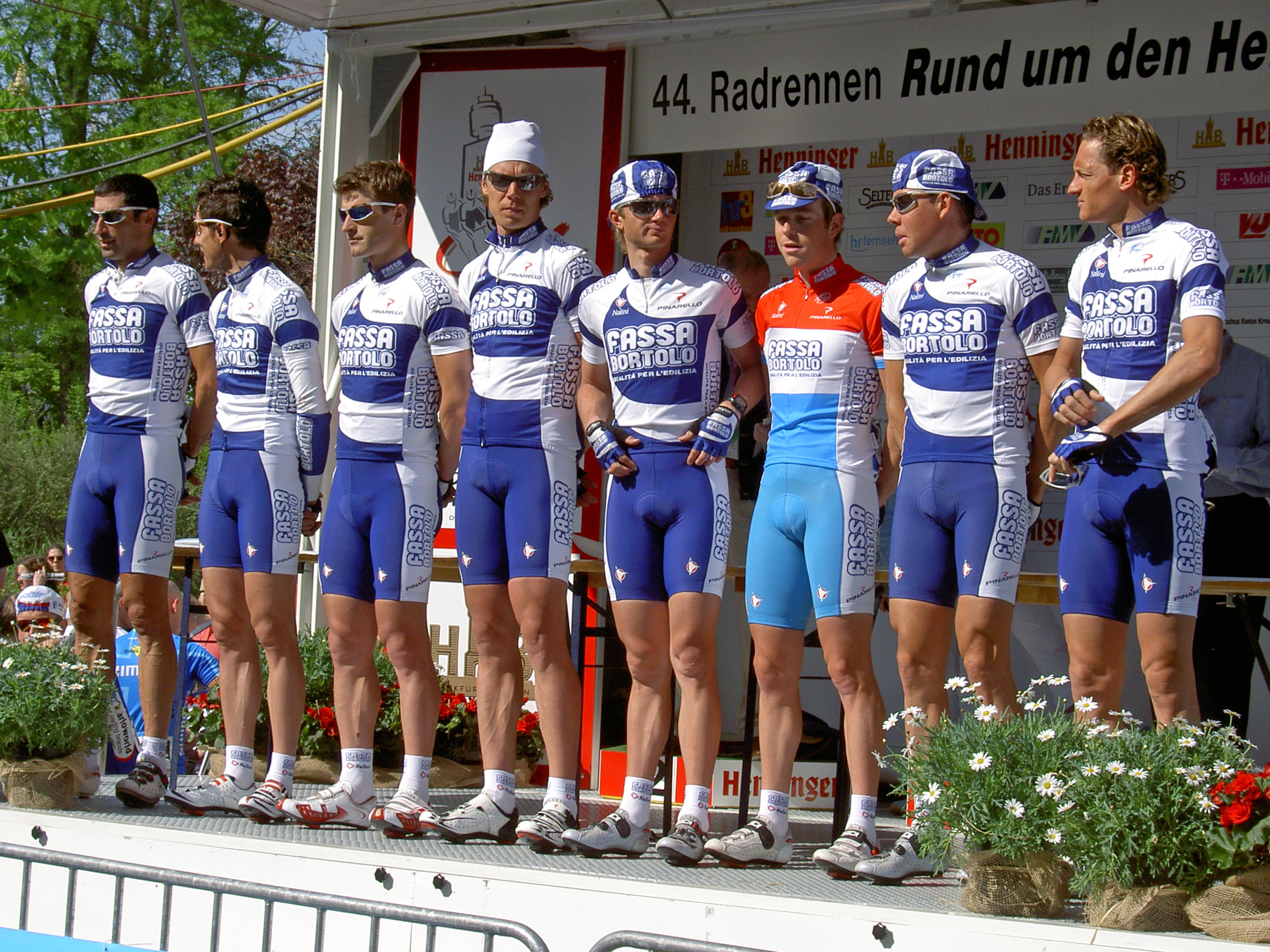
2005 Rund um den Henninger Turm

Fassa Bortolo (2000–2005) was a professional road bicycle racing team founded in 2000 and led by Giancarlo Ferretti. Dubbed the 'Silver Team', it managed to be one of the most successful teams of the era, not in the least due to top sprinter Alessandro Petacchi. In its six competitive years, Fassa Bortolo won over 200 races, including stages in all three Grand Tours. It was one of the inaugural 20 UCI ProTour teams in 2005.

Fassa Bortolo stopped the sponsorship of the team after 2005. Efforts to find a new co-sponsor for 2006 proved unsuccessful. On October 14, 2005, a man claiming to represent proposed new sponsor Sony Ericsson turned out to be an imposter, leaving all staff and riders unemployed.

Petacchi and some of his helpers moved to the new Team Milram, a continuation of the Domina Vacanze Team. The other Fassa Bortolo riders all moved to different teams.

== Team 2005 ==
The main part of the riders signed early contracts with new teams for 2006, and eventually all riders found new teams.

Name	Birthday	Nationality	2006 team
Andrus Aug	22.05.1972	Estonia	Acqua & Sapone
Fabio Baldato	13.06.1968	Italy	Tenax
Lorenzo Bernucci	15.09.1979	Italy	T-Mobile Team
Paolo Bossoni	02.07.1976	Italy	Tenax
Marzio Bruseghin	15.06.1974	Italy	Lampre–Fondital
Fabian Cancellara	18.03.1981	Switzerland	Team CSC
Francesco Chicchi	27.11.1981	Italy	Quick-Step–Innergetic
Massimo Codol	27.02.1973	Italy	Tenax
Claudio Corioni	26.12.1982	Italy	Lampre–Fondital
Mauro Facci	11.05.1982	Italy	Barloworld
Juan Antonio Flecha	17.09.1977	Spain	Rabobank
Dario Frigo	18.09.1973	Italy	Fired for doping
Massimo Giunti	29.07.1974	Italy	Naturino
Volodymyr Hustov	15.02.1977	Ukraine	Team CSC
Andrej Hauptman	05.05.1975	Slovenia	Radenska
Kim Kirchen	03.07.1978	Luxembourg	T-Mobile Team
Gustav Larsson	20.09.1980	Sweden	Team CSC
Vincenzo Nibali	14.11.1984	Italy	Liquigas
Alberto Ongarato	24.07.1975	Italy	Team Milram
Alessandro Petacchi	03.01.1974	Italy	Team Milram
Roberto Petito	01.02.1971	Italy	Tenax
Fabio Sacchi	22.05.1974	Italy	Team Milram
Julian Sanchez Pimienta	26.02.1980	Spain	Comunidad Valenciana
Kanstantsin Sivtsov	09.08.1982	Belarus	Acqua & Sapone
Matteo Tosatto	14.05.1974	Italy	Quick-Step–Innergetic
Marco Velo	09.03.1974	Italy	Team Milram

== Major wins ==
2000
Giro della Provincia di Lucca, Alessandro Petacchi
GP Città´ di Camaiore, Wladimir Belli
Paris–Nice Stage 3, Fabio Baldato
Paris–Nice Stage 5, Matteo Tosatto
Giro d'Italia Points classification, Dimitri Konyshev

Stage 6, Dimitri Konyshev

Tour de Luxembourg Stage 2, Nicola Loda
Tour de Luxembourg Stage 3 and 5, Alessandro Petacchi
Tour de Suisse Stage 3, Wladimir Belli
Tour de Suisse Stage 7, Marco Fincato
Giro di Romagna et Coppa Placci, Dimitri Konyshev
Vuelta a España, Stage 8, 12 – Alessandro Petacchi
Giro di Lombardia, Raimondas Rumšas

2001
GP Città´ di Camaiore, Michele Bartoli
Route du Sud Overall, Francesco Casagrande
Giro del Trentino, Francesco Casagrande
Tour Mediterranean Stage 1, Ivan Basso
Omloop Het Nieuwsblad, Michele Bartoli
Paris–Nice Overall, Dario Frigo

Stage 6, Dario Frigo

Vuelta Ciclista al Pais Vasco Overall, Raimondas Rumšas

Stage 5b, Raimondas Rumšas

Tour de Romandie Overall, Dario Frigo
Giro d'Italia Stage 12, Matteo Tosatto
Giro d'Italia Stage 15, Dario Frigo
Euskal Bizikleta Stage 4a, Alessandro Petacchi
Euskal Bizikleta Stage 5, Ivan Basso
Lithuania National Road Championship, Raimondas Rumšas
Russia National Road Championship, Dimitri Konyshev
Tour de Luxembourg Stage 3, Kim Kirchen
Tour de Luxembourg Stage 5, Fabio Baldato
Tour de Suisse Stage 5, Dimitri Konyshev
Tour de Suisse Stage 6, Serguei Ivanov
Tour de France, Stage 9 – Serguei Ivanov
Coppa Ugo Agostoni, Francesco Casagrande
Trofeo Melinda, Francesco Casagrande
Tour de Pologne Stage 4, Alessandro Petacchi
Ster Elektrotoer Stage 3, Luca Mazzanti
Coppa Sabatini, Dimitri Konyshev

2002
Giro del Trentino, Francesco Casagrande
Coppa Placci, Matteo Tosatto
Trofeo dell´Etna, Fabio Baldato
Settimana Ciclistica Lombarda, Tadej Valjavec
Tour Mediterranean Overall, Michele Bartoli

Stage 4, Michele Bartoli
Stage 5, Alessandro Petacchi

Trofeo Luis Puig, Sergei Ivanov
Volta a la Comunidad Valenciana Stage 1, 2 & 3, Alessandro Petacchi
Paris–Nice Stage 1 & 5, Alessandro Petacchi
Settimana Ciclistica Internazionale, Francesco Casagrande
KBC Driedaagse van De Panne – Koksijde Stage 3a, Fabio Baldato
Amstel Gold Race, Michele Bartoli
Tour de Berne, Kim Kirchen
Tour de Suisse Stage 5, Francesco Casagrande
Ukraine National Road Championship, Serhiy Honchar
Rothaus Regio-Tour International, Alessandro Petacchi
Ronde van Nederland Overall, Kim Kirchen

Stage 3, Alessandro Petacchi
Stage 5, Sergei Ivanov

Vuelta a España Stage 12, Alessandro Petacchi
Giro dell'Emilia, Michele Bartoli
Milano–Torino, Michele Bartoli
Giro di Lombardia, Michele Bartoli

2003
Profronde van Oostvoorne, Alessandro Petacchi
Spektakel van Steenwijk, Alessandro Petacchi
Dwars door Gendringen, Alessandro Petacchi
Giro della Provincia di Reggio Calabria, Aitor González Jiménez
Criterium Aalst, Alessandro Petacchi
Ronde van Pijnacker, Alessandro Petacchi
Trofeo dell´Etna, Alessandro Petacchi
Tour de Berne, Filippo Pozzato
Trofeo Laigueglia, Filippo Pozzato
Trofeo Luis Puig, Alessandro Petacchi
Volta a la Comunidad Valenciana Overall, Dario Frigo

Stage 1, Dario Frigo
Stage 5, Alessandro Petacchi

Paris–Nice Stage 1, Alessandro Petacchi
Paris–Nice Stage 4, Dario Frigo
Tirreno–Adriatico Overall, Filippo Pozzato

Stage 2, Filippo Pozzato

Setmana Catalana de Ciclisme Overall, Dario Frigo

Stage 3, Marco Zanotti
Stage 4, Dario Frigo

Tour de Romandie Prologue, Fabian Cancellara
Giro d'Italia, Stage 1, 5, 6, 13, 16, 17, Alessandro Petacchi
Giro d'Italia, Stage 15, Aitor González Jiménez
Giro d'Italia, Stage 18, Dario Frigo
Tour de Belgium Stage 4, Fabian Cancellara
Tour de Luxembourg Stage 2, Nicola Loda
Tour de Luxembourg Stage 5, Serguei Ivanov
Tour de Suisse Prologue, Fabian Cancellara
Slovenia National Road Championship, Tadej Valjavec
Trofeo Matteotti, Filippo Pozzato
Tour de France, Stage 1, 3, 5, 6, Alessandro Petacchi
Tour de la Wallonne Stage 3, Michele Bartoli
Rothaus Regio-Tour International Overall, Volodymir Gustov

Stage 2a, Marco Zanotti

Ronde van Nederland Stage 1 & 2, Alessandro Petacchi
Vuelta a España, Stage 3, 5, 12, 14, 21, Alessandro Petacchi
Paris – Bruxelles, Kim Kirchen
Giro del Lazio, Michele Bartoli
Giro di Lombardia, Michele Bartoli

2004
Tour of Qatar Stage 4, Fabian Cancellara
Trofeo Laigueglia, Filippo Pozzato
Tirreno–Adriatico Stage 1, 2, 7, Alessandro Petacchi
Tirreno–Adriatico Stage 5, Roberto Petito
Setmana Catalana de Ciclisme de Ciclisme Stage 1, Fabian Cancellara
Giro di Toscana, Matteo Tosatto
Giro d'Italia Points Classification, Alessandro Petacchi

Most Combative classification, Alessandro Petacchi
Winner Azzurri d'Italia classification, Alessandro Petacchi
Stages 2, 5, 7, 9, 11, 13, 15, 16 and 21, Alessandro Petacchi

Tour de Luxembourg Stage 4, Fabian Cancellara
Tour de Luxembourg Stage 5, Kim Kirchen
Luxembourg National Road Championship, Kim Kirchen
Switzerland National Time Trial Championship, Fabian Cancellara
Tour de France, Prologue – Fabian Cancellara
Tour de France, Stage 7 – Filippo Pozzato
Tour de France, Stage 14 – Aitor González Jiménez
Züri-Metzgete, Juan Antonio Flecha
Ronde van Nederland Stage 3, Alessandro Petacchi
GP Kanton Aargau, Matteo Tosatto
Vuelta a España, Stage 2, 4, 7, 13, Alessandro Petacchi
Giro del Lazio, Juan Antonio Flecha

2005
GP Etruscan Coast, Alessandro Petacchi
Trophy Laigueglia, Kim Kirchen
Vuelta a Andalucía Stage 4, 5, Alessandro Petacchi
Trofeo Luis Puig, Alessandro Petacchi
Volta a la Comunidad Valenciana Overall, Alessandro Petacchi

Stage 1, 2, 5, Alessandro Petacchi
Stage 4, Juan Antonio Flecha

Milano–Torino, Fabio Sacchi
Tirreno–Adriatico Stage 1, 6, 7, Alessandro Petacchi
Paris–Nice Stage 4, Fabian Cancellara
2005 Milan–San Remo, Alessandro Petacchi
Setmana Catalana de Ciclisme de Ciclisme Stage 1, Fabian Cancellara
Setmana Catalana de Ciclisme de Ciclisme Stage 2, Claudio Corioni
International Cycling Week Stage 4, Kim Kirchen
Giro del Trentino Stage 4, Andrus Aug
Tour de Romandie Stage 1, 2, Alessandro Petacchi
Giro d'Italia, Stage 9, 12, 15, 20, Alessandro Petacchi
Tour de Luxembourg Stage 2, Alberto Ongarato
Tour de Luxembourg Stage 3, Dario Frigo
Tour de Luxembourg Stage 4, Fabian Cancellara
Tour de France Stage 6, Lorenzo Bernucci
Tour de la Wallonne, Alberto Ongarato
Vuelta a España, Points Classification, Alessandro Petacchi

Stage 3, 4, 8, 12, 21, Alessandro Petacchi

Tour de Pologne Overall, Kim Kirchen

Stage 7, Kim Kirchen

== National champions ==
2001
1st Lithuanian National Road Championship, Raimondas Rumšas
1st Russian National Road Championship, Dimitri Konyshev
2002
1st Ukrainian National Road Championship, Serhiy Honchar
2003
1st Slovenian National Road Championship, Tadej Valjavec
2004
1st Luxembourg National Road Championship, Kim Kirchen
1st Swiss National Time Trial Championship, Fabian Cancellara
